= 10th general convention of Communist Party of Nepal (Unified Socialist) =

10th General convention of Communist Party of Nepal (Unified Socialist)
1–5 July 2024
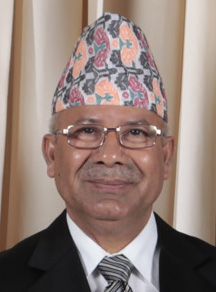
Candidate	Madhav Kumar Nepal
popular vote	Unopposed
Leader before election
Madhav Kumar Nepal
Elected Leader
Madhav Kumar Nepal

10th general convention of Communist Party of Nepal (Unified Socialist) was held for 1–5 July 2024 to elect central committee members and portfolios. The five day schedule program was held in national capital, Kathmandu of Nepal.

1,849 delegates were elected from constituencies and clusters to elect 299 central committee members and 21 office bearers. While vital post like Chairman, Senior Vice Chairman, General Secretary and respected leader were elected unopposed, elected was held for other post from within central committee members.

== Elected portfolios ==
S.N	Name	Votes	Result	Reference
Chairperson (1)
1	Madhav Kumar Nepal	Elected unopposed		
Senior Vice Chairperson (1)
1	Rajendra Prasad Pandey	Elected unopposed		
General Secretary (1)
1	Ghanashyam Bhusal	Elected unopposed		

=== Portfolios elected from central committee ===
67 people filed candidacy for the party portfolios for which central committee members voted.

Candidate's Name		Pannel	Votes		Percentage	Result	Reference
Candidate's Name		Pannel	Obtained	Total	Percentage	Result	Reference
Quota	Vice-chairman (6)						
Open (4)	Gangalal Tuladhar	Nepal	189	344	54.94	Elected	
Open (4)	Bhanu Bhakta Joshi	Bhusal	161	344	46.80	Elected	
Open (4)	Prakash Jwala	Nepal	156	344	45.34	Elected	
Open (4)	Jagannath Khatiwada	Nepal	139	344	40.41	Elected	
Open (4)	Birodh Khatiwada		127	344	36.92		
Open (4)	Bijay Paudel		107	344	31.10		
Open (4)	Keshav Lal Shrestha		90	344	26.16		
Open (4)	Balaram Prasad Banskota		57	344	16.57		
Open (4)	Urbadatta Panta		51	344	14.83		
Open (4)	Shadhya Bahadur Bhandari		42	344	12.21		
Open (4)	Lalit Bahadur Chhetri		34	344	9.88		
Madhesi (1)	Ram Chandra Jha	Nepal	144	344	40.86		
Madhesi (1)	Dharmanath Prasad Sah	Bhusal	164	344	47.67	Elected	
Women (1)	Ram Kumari Jhakri	Bhusal	112	344	32.55		
Women (1)	Jayanti Devi Rai	Nepal	199	344	57.85	Elected	

Candidate's Name		Pannel	Votes		Percentage	Result	Reference
Candidate's Name		Pannel	Obtained	Total	Percentage	Result	Reference
Quota	Deputy General Secretary (4)						
Open	Metmani Chaudhary	Independent	158	344	45.93	Elected	
Open	Ram Kumar Bhattarai	Nepal	107	344	31.10	Elected	
Open	Garima Shah	Independent	107	344	31.10	Elected	
Open	Rajendra Kumar Rai	Nepal	106	344	30.81	Elected	
Open	Jiwan Ram Shrestha	Bhusal	98	344	28.49		
Open	Laxman KC	Nepal	88	344	25.58		
Open	Ram Chandra Yadav	Nepal	78	344	22.67		
Open	Hari Prasad Parajuli		64	344	18.60		
Open	Amar Bahadur Thapa		56	344	16.28		
Open	Satrudhan Mahato		42	344	12.20		
Open	Mahesh Regmi		38	344	11.05		
Open	Dr. Deuman Sambahamphe		29	344	8.43		
Open	ShreePrasad Shah		28		8.14		
Open	Meena Gnawali (Nepal)		28		8.14		
Open	Nagendra Prasad Chaudhary		27		7.85		
Open	Laxman Paudel		22		6.40		
Open	Bhabishwor Parajuli		21		6.10		
Open	Goma Bista		16		4.65		
Open	Bhawani Khadka		7		2.03		

Candidate's Name		Pannel	Votes		Percentage	Result	Reference
Candidate's Name		Pannel	Obtained	Total	Percentage	Result	Reference
Quota	Secretary (7)						
Open (5)	Sher Bahadur Kunwar		153	344	45.93	Elected	
Open (5)	Som Prasad Pandey		141	344	31.10	Elected	
Open (5)	Shreenath Baral		107	344	31.10	Elected	
Open (5)	Sabitra Bhusal		106	344	30.81	Elected	
Open (5)	Chandra Bahadur Shahi		91	344	31.10	Elected	
Open (5)	Dil Kumari Panta (Dilu)		90	344	26.16		
Open (5)	Dhana Raj Acharya		75	344	21.80		
Open (5)	Dr. Bansidhar Mishra		67	344	19.48		
Open (5)	Naresh Kumar Shahi		66	344	19.19		
Open (5)	Dharma Raj Niraula		58	344	16.86		
Open (5)	Dirgha Bahadur Sodari		53	344	15.41		
Open (5)	Dhan Prasad Gautam		46	344	13.37		
Open (5)	Shiva Bahadur Bhandari		42	344	12.21		
Open (5)	Krishna Prasad Sharma Khanal		35	344	10.17		
Open (5)	Dr. Rajendra Man Shrestha		35	344	10.17		
Open (5)	Hasta Bahadur Shahi		34	344	9.88		
Open (5)	Sher Bahadur KC		31	344	9.01		
Open (5)	Damodar Aryal		30	344	8.72		
Open (5)	Keshav Kumar Bista		28	344	8.14		
Open (5)	Bidur Prasad Sapkota		26	344	7.56		
Open (5)	Dharma Raj Poudel		24	344	6.98		
Open (5)	Rameshwor Shrestha		22	344	6.40		
Open (5)	Guru Prasad Burlakoti		18	344	5.23		
Open (5)	Ratneshwor Goit Yadav		13	344	3.78		
Open (5)	Bhaskar Kafle		9	344	2.62		
Dalit (1)	Neera Devi Jairu		98	344	28.49		
Dalit (1)	Ganesh Bishwakarma		180	344	52.33	Elected	
Dalit (1)	Krishna Bahadur Nepali		26	344	7.56		
Adibasi Janajati (1)	Baldev Chaudhary		175	344	50.87	Elected	
Adibasi Janajati (1)	Tok Bahadur Waiba (Tamang)		91	344	31.10		
Adibasi Janajati (1)	Rajan Rai		26	344	7.56		

== Elected politburo members ==
Similarly, for 85 membered politburo, 204 filed their candidacy.

SN	Elected politburo members (84)	Votes
1	Birodh Khatiwada	201
2	Jeevan Ram Shrestha	195
3	Rama Ale Magar	194
4	Ram Kumari Jhakri	182
5	Ram Chandra Jha	180
6	Kalyani Kumari Khadka	180
7	Dr. Bijay Kumar Paudel	179
8	Keshav Lal Shrestha	179
9	Ram Kumar Gyawali	177
10	Bhawani Prasad Khapung	176
11	Dr. Bansidhar Mishra	169
12	Bijay Gurung	169
13	Urbadutta Pant	165
14	Nira Devi Jairu	162
15	Nagendra Prasad Chaudhary	160
16	Amar Bahadur Thapa	160
17	Balram Prasad Baskota	158
18	Satrudhan Mahato	157
19	Dil Kumari Panta	157
20	Sudesh Parajuli	154
21	Shree Prasad Sah	153
22	Ashesh Ghimire	152
23	Laxman KC	151
24	Mohan Gautam	151
25	Premal Kumar Khanal	149
26	Bishwanath Pyakurel	149
27	Laxman Lamsal	148
28	Dhanraj Acharya	147
29	Pasang Sherpa	145
30	Chun Kumari Chaudhary	145
31	Munu Sigdel	143
32	Rajendra Prakash Lohani	143
33	Ram Chandra Yadav	142
34	Hari Prasad Parajuli	141
35	Ashok Koirala	141
36	Gautam Rai	139
37	Sadhya Bahadur Bhandari	138
38	Krishna Lal Maharjan	136
39	Naresh Kumar Shahi	135
40	Sudhir Prasad Sah	133
41	Hasta Bahadur Shahi	133
42	Guru Prasad Burlakoti	133
43	Abdul Husen Khan	132
44	Laxman Paudel	131
45	Hikmat Bahadur Shahi	130
46	Basanta Prasad Manandhar	130
47	Mina Gyawali	129
48	Durga Pariyar	129
49	Tok Bahadur Tamang	128
50	Dhan Prasad Gautam	128
51	Bechi Lungeli	127
52	Prakash Rawal	127
53	Jeevan Rai	126
54	Rajan Rai	125
55	Dr. Rajendra Man Shrestha	125
56	Dr. Krishna Raj Panta	125
57	Sarala Kumari Yadav	125
58	Harka Bahadur Singh	124
59	Mahesh Regmi	122
60	Dr. Deuman Samwahangphe	122
61	Dirga Bahadur Sodari	122
62	Keshav Kumar Bista	122
63	Taj Mohammad Miya	122
64	Bhagwati Nepal	121
65	Manju Kumari Yadav	121
66	Bidur Prasad Sapkota	119
67	Chunu KC	118
68	Pabitra Gharti	118
69	Ganga Prasad Nepal	116
70	Birendra Bahadur Bhandari	114
71	Dinesh Kumar Rai	114
72	Er. Nandlal Banjade	113
73	Damodar Aryal	112
74	Prof Dr. Indu Acharya	110
75	Bhabiswor Parajuli	109
76	Sher Bahadur KC	109
77	Dharmaraj Niraula	108
78	Bidya Chamling Rai	108
79	Usha Kumari Pokhrel	108
80	Shiva Prasad Bhandari	107
81	Khinu Langwa Limbu	107
82	Rama Gharti	107
83	Shankar Prasad Pokhrel	107
84	Ambika Thapa	107
