= Mugu 1 =

Parliamentary constituency in Nepal

- Parliamentary constituency for the House of Representatives
- Mugu 1 in Karnali Province

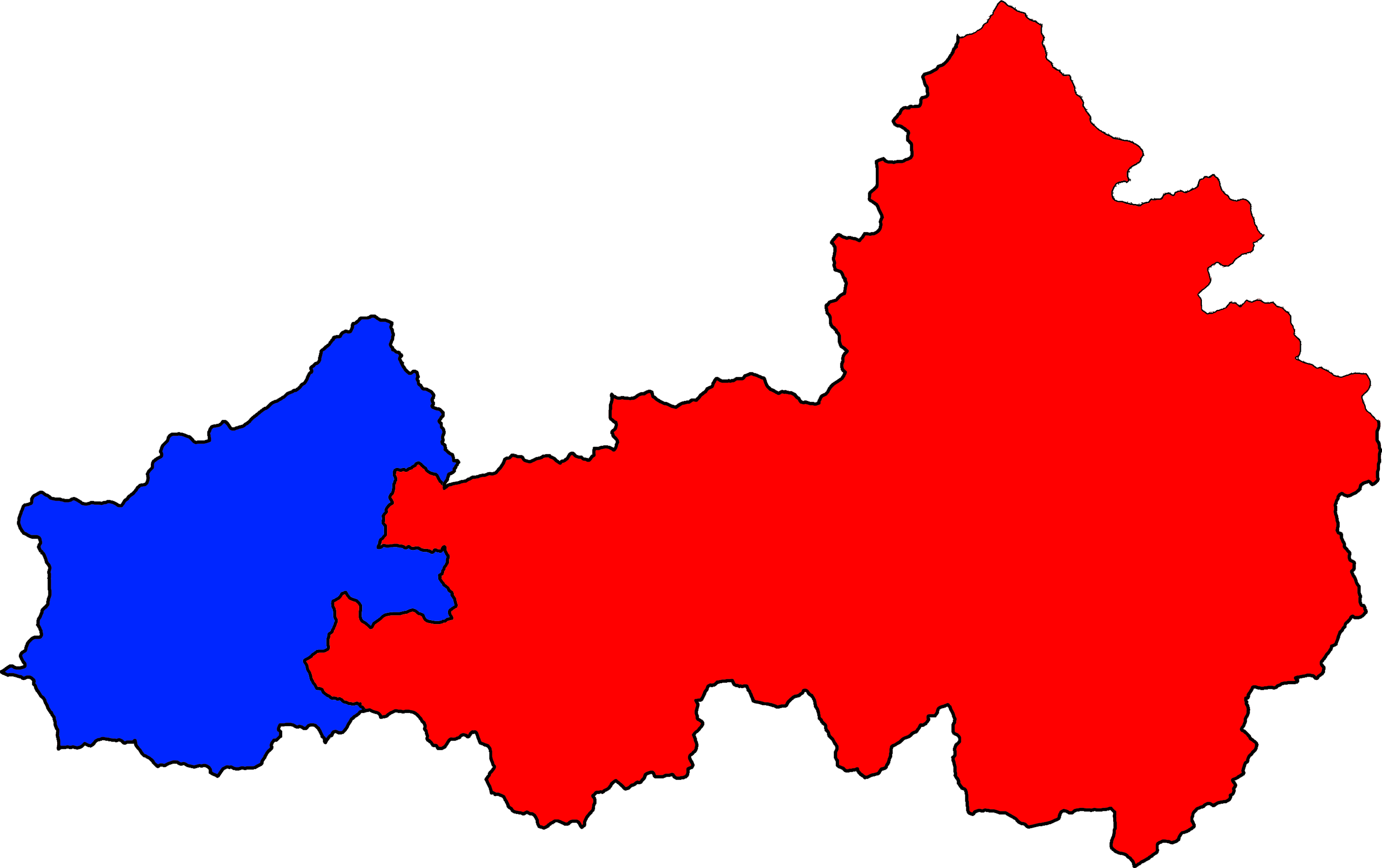
- Assembly segments Mugu 1(A) (red) and Mugu 1(B) (blue) within Mugu District
- Province: Karnali Province
- District: Mugu District
- Electorate: 30,015

Current constituency
- Created: 1991
- Number of members: 3
- Member of Parliament: Ain Bahadur Shahi, Congress
- Karnali MPA 1(A): Jeet Bahadur Malla, UML
- Karnali MPA 1(B): Mangal Bahadur Shahi, Maoist Centre

Mugu 1 is the parliamentary constituency of Mugu District in Nepal. This constituency came into existence on the Constituency Delimitation Commission (CDC) report submitted on 31 August 2017.

== Incorporated areas ==
Mugu 1 incorporates the entirety of Mugu District.

== Assembly segments ==
It encompasses the following Karnali Provincial Assembly segment

- Mugu 1(A)
- Mugu 1(B)

== Members of Parliament ==
=== Parliament/Constituent Assembly ===
Election	Member	Party
1991	Hasta Bahadur Malla	Nepali Congress
1999	Chandra Bahadur Shahi	CPN (UML)
2008	Nav Raj Dhami	CPN (Maoist)
January 2009	Nav Raj Dhami	UCPN (Maoist)
2013	Mohan Baniya	CPN (UML)
2017	Gopal Bahadur Bam	CPN (UML)
May 2018	Gopal Bahadur Bam	Nepal Communist Party
March 2021	Gopal Bahadur Bam	CPN (UML)
August 2021	Gopal Bahadur Bam	CPN (Unified Socialist)
2022	Aain Bahadur Shahi Thakuri	Nepali Congress

=== Provincial Assembly ===
==== 1(A) ====
Election	Member	Party
2017	Dan Singh Pariyar	CPN (UML)
May 2018	Dan Singh Pariyar	Nepal Communist Party
March 2021	Dan Singh Pariyar	CPN (UML)
2022	Jeet Bahadur Malla	CPN (UML)

==== 1(B) ====
Election	Member	Party
2017	Chandra Bahadur Shahi	CPN (UML)
May 2018	Chandra Bahadur Shahi	Nepal Communist Party
March 2021	Chandra Bahadur Shahi	CPN (UML)
August 2021	Chandra Bahadur Shahi	CPN (Unified Socialist)
2022	Mangal Bahadur Shahi	CPN (Maoist Centre)

== Election results ==
=== Election in the 2020s ===
==== 2022 general election ====
Candidate	Party	Votes	%
Aain Bahadur Shahi Thakuri	Nepali Congress	14,706	56.96
Raj Bahadur Karki	CPN (UML)	10,710	41.48
Others		404	1.56
Total		25,820	100.00
Majority		3,996	
Nepali Congress gain			

==== 2022 provincial election ====
===== 1(A) =====
Candidate	Party	Votes	%
Jeet Bahadur Malla	CPN (UML)	6,618	53.22
Gopal Bahadur Bam	CPN (Unified Socialist)	5,546	44.60
Others		272	2.19
Total		12,436	100.00
Majority		1,072	
CPN (UML) hold			

===== 1(B) =====
Candidate	Party	Votes	%
Mangal Bahadur Shahi	CPN (Maoist Centre)	8,439	62.53
Karna Bahadur Malla	CPN (UML)	4,893	36.25
Others		165	1.22
Total		13,497	100.00
Majority		3,546	
CPN (Maoist Centre) gain			

=== Election in the 2010s ===
==== 2017 general election ====
Candidate	Party	Votes	%
Gopal Bahadur Bam	CPN (UML)	13,034	56.68
Hasta Bahadur Malla	Nepali Congress	9,861	42.89
Raj Bahadur Bham	Naya Shakti Pary	99	0.43
Total		22,994	100.00
Valid votes		22,994	97.26
Invalid/blank votes		648	2.74
Total votes		23,642	100.00
Registered voters/turnout		30,015	78.77
Majority		3,173	
CPN (UML) hold			
Source: Election Commission

==== 2017 provincial election ====
===== 1(A) =====
Candidate	Party	Votes	%
Dan Singh Pariyar	CPN (UML)	5,653	51.30
Tilak Bahadur Malla	Nepali Congress	5,299	48.09
Hiramati Bishwakarma	Naya Shakti Party	68	0.62
Total		11,020	100.00
Valid votes		11,020	96.92
Invalid/blank votes		350	3.08
Total votes		11,370	100.00
Registered voters/turnout		14,192	80.12
Majority		354	
CPN (UML) gain			
Source: Election Commission

===== 1(B) =====
Candidate	Party	Votes	%
Chandra Bahadur Shahi	CPN (UML)	6,845	58.43
Khadga Shahi	Nepali Congress	4,612	39.37
Dhan Tamata	Janasamajbadi Party	253	2.16
Surabir Shahi	Naya Shakti Party	4	0.03
Total		11,714	100.00
Valid votes		11,714	95.86
Invalid/blank votes		506	4.14
Total votes		12,220	100.00
Registered voters/turnout		15,823	77.23
Majority		2,233	
CPN (UML) gain			
Source: Election Commission

==== 2013 Constituent Assembly election ====
Candidate	Party	Votes	%
Mohan Baniya	CPN (UML)	8,146	46.07
Aain Bahadur Shahi Thakuri	Nepali Congress	6,252	35.36
Sukvir Budha	UCPN (Maoist)	1,843	10.42
Others		1,440	8.14
Total		17,681	100.00
Valid votes		17,681	96.58
Invalid/blank votes		627	3.42
Total votes		18,308	100.00
Registered voters/turnout		23,821	76.86
Majority		1,894	
CPN (UML) gain			
Source: Election Commission

=== Election in the 2000s ===
==== 2008 Constituent Assembly election ====
Candidate	Party	Votes	%
Nav Raj Dhami	CPN (Maoist)	10,100	40.81
Chandra Bahadur Shahi	CPN (UML)	6,943	28.06
Hasta Bahadur Malla	Nepali Congress	6,208	25.09
Others		1,496	6.05
Total		24,747	100.00
Valid votes		24,747	97.32
Invalid/blank votes		682	2.68
Total votes		25,429	100.00
Registered voters/turnout		33,720	75.41
Majority		3,157	
CPN (Maoist) gain			
Source: Election Commission

=== Election in the 1990s ===
==== 1999 general election ====
Candidate	Party	Votes	%
Chandra Bahadur Shahi	CPN (UML)	11,134	53.36
Karme Jaishi	Nepali Congress	8,701	41.70
Others		1,029	4.93
Total		20,864	100.00
Valid votes		20,864	98.27
Invalid/blank votes		368	1.73
Total votes		21,232	100.00
Registered voters/turnout		29,296	72.47
Majority		2,433	
CPN (UML) gain			
Source: Election Commission

==== 1994 general election ====
Candidate	Party	Votes	%
Hasta Bahadur Malla	Nepali Congress	9,190	55.87
Chandra Bahadur Shahi	CPN (UML)	7,259	44.13
Total		16,449	100.00
Majority		1,931	
Nepali Congress hold			
Source: Election Commission

==== 1991 general election ====
Candidate	Party	Votes	%
Hasta Bahadur Malla	Nepali Congress	8,344	66.57
-	CPN (UML)	4,190	33.43
Total		12,534	100.00
Majority		4,154	
Nepali Congress gain			

== See also ==
- List of parliamentary constituencies of Nepal
