= 10th general convention of Communist Party of Nepal (Unified Marxist–Leninist) =

10th General convention of Communist Party of Nepal (Unified Marxist–Leninist)
- 26–29 November 2021
Candidate	K. P. Sharma Oli	Bhim Rawal
Delegate count	1808	223
Chairman before election
K. P. Sharma Oli
Elected Chairman
K. P. Sharma Oli

10th general convention of Communist Party of Nepal (Unified Marxist–Leninist) was held for 26–29 November 2021 to elect central committee members and portfolios. It was held in Sauraha, Chitwan District of Nepal.

1,999 delegates were elected while 5% was nominated.

== Elected portfolios ==
S.N	Name	Votes	Result	Reference
Chairperson (1)
1	KP Sharma Oli	1808	Elected	
2	Bhim Bahadur Rawal	223	Lost	
Senior Vice Chairperson (1)
1	Ishwar Pokhrel	Elected unopposed		
Vice Chairperson (6)
1	Astalaxmi Shakya	1976	Elected	
2	Surendra Pandey	1925	Elected	
3	Subas Chandra Nemwang	1865	Elected	
4	Bishnu Prasad Paudel	1856	Elected	
5	Yubraj Gyawali	1842	Elected	
6	Ram Bahadur Thapa	1768	Elected	
7	Ghanashyam Bhusal	725	Lost	
General Secretary (1)
1	Shankar Pokharel	Elected unopposed		
Deputy general secretary (3)
1	Pradeep Kumar Gyawali	Elected unopposed		
2	Bishnu Rimal	Elected unopposed		
3	Prithvi Subba Gurung	Elected unopposed		
Secretary (7)
1	Gokarna Bista	1976	Elected	
2	Yogesh Bhattarai	1964	Elected	
3	Padma Kumari Aryal	1800	Elected	
4	Chhabilal Bishwakarma	1800	Elected	
5	Lekh Raj Bhatta	1704	Elected	
6	Top Bahadur Rayamajhi	1700	Elected	
7	Raghubir Mahaseth	1513	Elected	
8	Bhim Acharya	1300	Lost	
9	Tanka Karki	500	Lost	

== See also ==
- 10th general convention of Communist Party of Nepal (Unified Socialist)
