= All Nepal Women's Association (Socialist) =

Women wing of the CPN (Unified Socialist)

All Nepal Women's Association (Socialist) अखिल नेपाल महिला सङ्घ (समाजवादी)
- President: Jayanti Rai
- Founded: 18 August 2021 (4 years ago)
- Headquarters: Kathmandu
- Membership: 5,000
- Ideology: Left-wing nationalism Women rights
- Mother party: Communist Party of Nepal (Unified Socialist)

All Nepal Women's Association (Socialist) is the woman's wing of the Communist Party of Nepal (Unified Socialist). The organization has organized committee all over Nepal.

Jayanti Rai serves as the chair of All Nepal Women's Association (Socialist).

== See also ==
- Communist Party of Nepal (Unified Socialist)
- All Nepal National Free Students Union
