= Gulmi 1 =

Parliamentary constituency in Lumbini Province, Nepal

- Parliamentary constituency
- Gulmi 1 in Lumbini Province
- Province: Lumbini Province
- District: Gulmi District

Current constituency
- Created: 1991
- Party: Rastriya Swatantra Party
- Member of Parliament: Sagar Dhakal

Gulmi 1 one of two parliamentary constituencies of Gulmi District in Nepal. This constituency came into existence on the Constituency Delimitation Commission (CDC) report submitted on 31 August 2017.

== Incorporated areas ==
Gulmi 1 incorporates Kaligandaki Rural Municipality, Satyawati Rural Municipality, Chandrakot Rural Municipality, Ruru Rural Municipality, Chatrakot Rural Municipality, Gulmidarbar Rural Municipality and wards 7–14 of Resunga Municipality.

== Assembly segments ==
It encompasses the following Lumbini Provincial Assembly segment

- Gulmi 1(A)
- Gulmi 1(B)

== Members of Parliament ==
=== Parliament/Constituent Assembly ===
Election	Member	Party
1991	Jhak Bahadur Pun	Nepali Congress
1994	Ram Nath Dhakal	CPN (Unified Marxist–Leninist)
1999	Fatik Bahadur Thapa	CPN (Unified Marxist–Leninist)
2008	Sudarshan Baral	CPN (Maoist)
January 2009	Sudarshan Baral	UCPN (Maoist)
2013	Prof. Dr. Krishna Bahadur Chhantel Thapa	Nepali Congress
2017	Pradeep Kumar Gyawali	CPN (UML)
May 2018	Pradeep Kumar Gyawali	Nepal Communist Party
March 2021	Pradeep Kumar Gyawali	CPN (UML)
2022	Chandra Kant Bhandari	Nepali Congress
2026	Sagar Dhakal	Rastriya Swatantra Party

=== Provincial Assembly ===
==== 1(A) ====
Election	Member	Party
2017	Sudarshan Baral	CPN (Maoist Centre)
May 2018	Sudarshan Baral	Nepal Communist Party

==== 1(B) ====
Election	Member	Party
2017	Kamal Raj Shrestha	CPN (Unified Marxist-Leninist)
May 2018	Kamal Raj Shrestha	Nepal Communist Party

== Election results ==
=== Election in the 2020s ===
==== 2026 general election ====
Candidate	Party	Votes	%
Sagar Dhakal	Rastriya Swatantra Party	29,642	47.13
Pradeep Kumar Gyawali	CPN (UML)	15,181	24.14
Chandra Kant Bhandari	Nepali Congress	13,505	21.47
Others		4,564	7.26
Total		62,892	100.00
Majority		14,461	
Rastriya Swatantra Party gain			

==== 2022 general election ====
Candidate	Party	Votes	%
Chandra Kant Bhandari	Nepali Congress	33,744	49.14
Pradeep Kumar Gyawali	CPN (UML)	32,152	46.83
Damodar Bhandari	Rastriya Swatantra Party	1,882	2.74
Others		886	1.29
Total		68,664	100.00
Majority		1,592	
Nepali Congress gain			

=== Election in the 2010s ===
==== 2017 legislative elections ====
Party	Candidate	Votes
CPN (Unified Marxist–Leninist)	Pradeep Kumar Gyawali	37,814
Nepali Congress	Chandra Kant Bhandari	30,256
Others		779
Invalid votes		1,717
Result	CPN (UML) gain	
Source: Election Commission

==== 2017 Nepalese provincial elections ====
===== 1(A) =====
Party	Candidate	Votes
CPN (Maoist Centre)	Sudarshan Baral	17,910
Nepali Congress	Pritha Bahadur Faudar	13,299
Others		1,488
Invalid votes		761
Result	Maoist Centre gain	
Source: Election Commission

===== 1(B) =====
Party	Candidate	Votes
CPN (Unified Marxist–Leninist)	Kamal Raj Shrestha	19,591
Nepali Congress	Dhanendra Karki	16,373
Others		514
Invalid votes		662
Result	CPN (UML) gain	
Source: Election Commission

==== 2013 Constituent Assembly election ====
Party	Candidate	Votes
Nepali Congress	Krishna Bahadur Chhantyal Thapa	10,592
CPN (Unified Marxist–Leninist)	Maina Kumari Bhandari	10,433
UCPN (Maoist)	Sudarshan Baral	5,032
Rastriya Janamorcha	Jaman Singh Singh Rana	1,051
Others		711
Result	Congress gain	
Source: NepalNews

=== Election in the 2000s ===
==== 2008 Constituent Assembly election ====
Party	Candidate	Votes
CPN (Maoist)	Sudarshan Baral	14,165
Nepali Congress	Subarna Jwarchan	9,701
CPN (Unified Marxist–Leninist)	Maina Kumari Bhandari	9,067
Rastriya Janamorcha	Jaman Singh Rana	1,784
Others		805
Invalid votes		1,637
Result	CPN (UML) hold	
Source: Election Commission

=== Election in the 1990s ===
==== 1999 legislative elections ====
Party	Candidate	Votes
CPN (Unified Marxist–Leninist)	Fatik Bahadur Thapa	18,672
Nepali Congress	Jhak Bahadur Pun	16,496
Rastriya Prajatantra Party	Rup Singh Thapa	1,039
Others		1,372
Invalid votes		750
Result	CPN (UML) hold	
Source: Election Commission

==== 1994 legislative elections ====
Party	Candidate	Votes
CPN (Unified Marxist–Leninist)	Ram Nath Dhakal	17,495
Nepali Congress	Bhakta Bahadur Pun	14,573
Rastriya Prajatantra Party	Nar Bahadur Budhathoki	1,446
Others		720
Result	CPN (UML) gain	
Source: Election Commission

==== 1991 legislative elections ====
Party	Candidate	Votes
Nepali Congress	Jhak Bahadur Pun	16,767
CPN (Unified Marxist–Leninist)		14,153
Result	Congress gain	

== See also ==
- List of parliamentary constituencies of Nepal
- Gulmi 2
