= Salyan 1 =

Parliamentary constituency in Nepal

- Parliamentary constituency for the House of Representatives
- Salyan 1 in Karnali Province

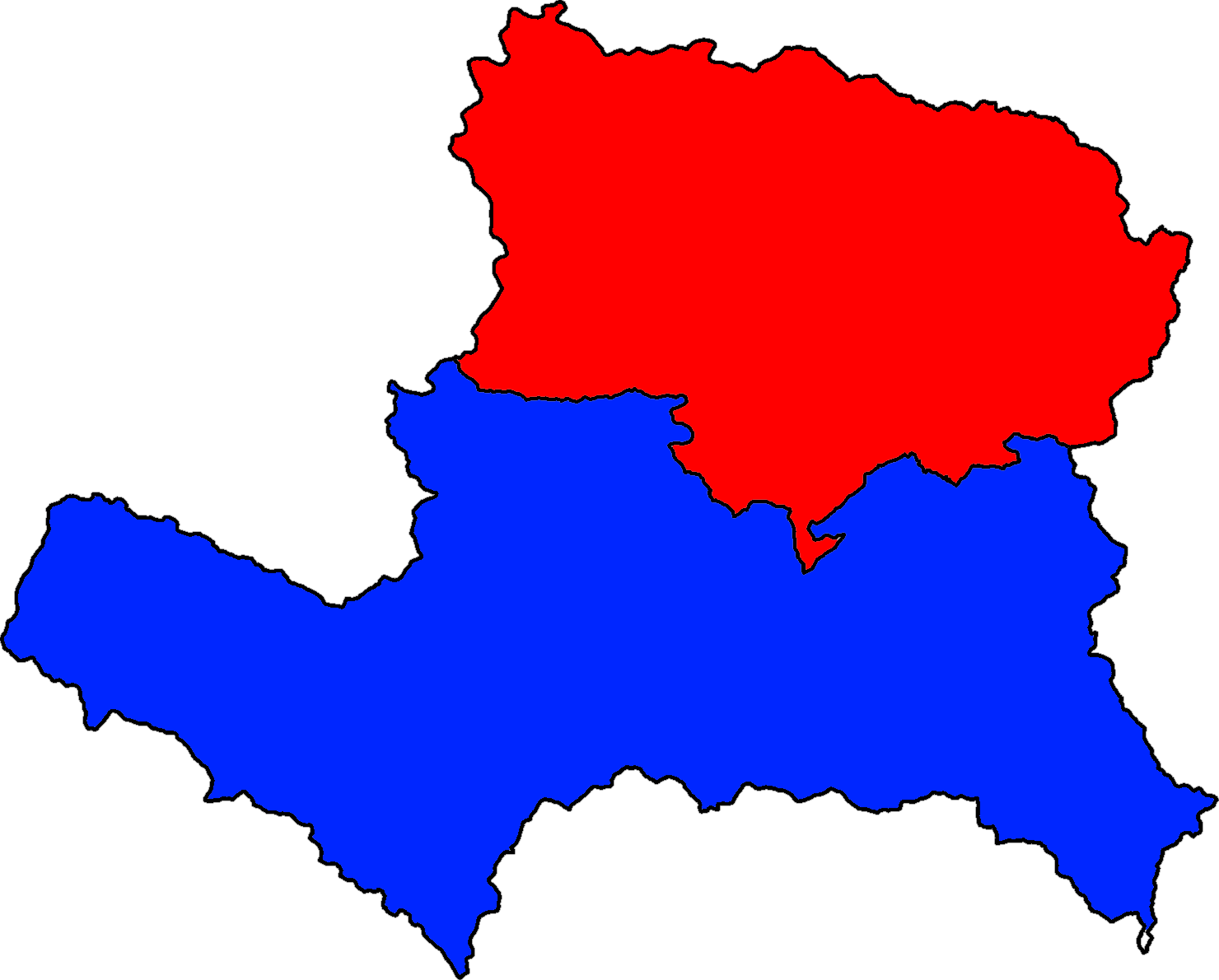
- Assembly segments Salyan 1(A) (red) and Salyan 1(B) (blue) within Salyan District, Nepal
- Province: Karnali Province
- District: Salyan District
- Electorate: 134,213

Current constituency
- Created: 1991
- Number of members: 3
- Member of Parliament: Prakash Jwala, Unified Socialist
- Karnali MPA 1(A): Bhim Prakash Sharma, Maoist Centre
- Karnali MPA 1(B): Suresh Adhikari, Congress

Salyan 1 is the parliamentary constituency of Salyan District in Nepal. This constituency came into existence on the Constituency Delimitation Commission (CDC) report submitted on 31 August 2017.

== Incorporated areas ==
Salyan 1 incorporates the entirety of Salyan District.

== Assembly segments ==
It encompasses the following Karnali Provincial Assembly segment

- Salyan 1(A)
- Salyan 1(B)

== Members of Parliament ==
=== Parliament/Constituent Assembly ===
Election	Member	Party
1991	Rajendra Bahadur Shah	Nepali Congress
1999	Prakash Jwala	CPN (UML)
2008	Tek Bahadur Basnet	CPN (Maoist)
January 2009	Tek Bahadur Basnet	UCPN (Maoist)
May 2016	Tek Bahadur Basnet	CPN (Maoist Centre)
May 2018	Tek Bahadur Basnet	Nepal Communist Party
March 2021	Tek Bahadur Basnet	CPN (Maoist Centre)
2022	Prakash Jwala	CPN (Unified Socialist)

=== Provincial Assembly ===
==== 1(A) ====
Election	Member	Party
2017	Gulab Jung Shah	CPN (UML)
May 2018	Gulab Jung Shah	Nepal Communist Party
March 2021	Gulab Jung Shah	CPN (UML)
2022	Bhim Prakash Sharma	CPN (Maoist Centre)

==== 1(B) ====
Election	Member	Party
2017	Prakash Jwala	CPN (UML)
May 2018	Prakash Jwala	Nepal Communist Party
March 2021	Prakash Jwala	CPN (UML)
2022	Suresh Adhikari	Nepali Congress

== Election results ==
=== Election in the 2020s ===
==== 2022 general election ====
Candidate	Party	Votes	%
Prakash Jwala	CPN (Unified Socialist)	35,707	46.78
Rajendra Bahadur Shah	Independent	19,792	25.93
Rajendra Bir Raya	CPN (UML)	13,039	17.08
Pawan Raj Devkota	Rastriya Swatantra Party	3,695	4.84
Netralal Shrestha	Rastriya Prajatantra Party	2,293	3.00
Bhim Bahadur Oli	CPN (Marxist–Leninist)	1,597	2.09
Others		205	0.27
Total		76,328	100.00
Majority		15,915	
CPN (Unified Socialist) gain			
Source: Election Commission

==== 2022 provincial election ====
===== 1(A) =====
Candidate	Party	Votes	%
Bhim Prakash Sharma	CPN (Maoist Centre)	22,254	57.29
Kul Bahadur Giri	CPN (UML)	14,229	36.63
Shiva Bahadur Oli	Rastriya Prajatantra Party	1,566	4.03
Others		796	2.05
Total		38,845	100.00
Majority		8,025	
CPN (Maoist Centre) gain			

===== 1(B) =====
Candidate	Party	Votes	%
Suresh Adhikari	Nepali Congress	20,424	51.05
Gulab Jung Shah	CPN (UML)	16,539	41.34
Narayan Kumar Sharma	Rastriya Prajatantra Party	2,581	6.45
Others		466	1.16
Total		40,010	100.00
Majority		3,885	
Nepali Congress gain			

=== Election in the 2010s ===
==== 2017 general election ====
Candidate	Party	Votes	%
Tek Bahadur Basnet	CPN (Maoist Centre)	32,281	51.55
Rajendra Bahadur Shah	Nepali Congress	23,289	37.19
Umakant Sharma	Independent	2,921	4.66
Bam Bahadur Giri	CPN (Marxist–Leninist)	2,292	3.66
Others		1,838	2.94
Total		62,621	100.00
Valid votes		62,621	91.31
Invalid/blank votes		5,956	8.69
Total votes		68,577	100.00
Registered voters/turnout		134,213	51.10
Majority		8,992	
CPN (Maoist Centre) hold			
Source: Election Commission

==== 2017 provincial election ====
===== 1(A) =====
Candidate	Party	Votes	%
Gulab Jung Shah	CPN (UML)	19,658	50.42
Ek Raj Dangi	Nepali Congress	10,612	27.22
Bheem Prakash Sharma	Independent	7,416	19.02
Top Bahadur Roka	CPN (Marxist–Leninist)	1,173	3.01
Dale Budha Magar	Rastriya Janamorcha	131	0.34
Total		38,990	100.00
Valid votes		38,990	92.19
Invalid/blank votes		3,303	7.81
Total votes		42,293	100.00
Registered voters/turnout		66,941	63.18
Majority		9,046	
CPN (UML) gain			
Source: Election Commission

===== 1(B) =====
Candidate	Party	Votes	%
Prakash Jwala	CPN (UML)	19,836	51.16
Dilli Raj Regmi	Nepali Congress	11,630	30.00
Rajendra Bir Raya	Rastriya Prajatantra Party	6,054	15.61
Others		1,253	3.23
Total		38,773	100.00
Valid votes		38,773	93.72
Invalid/blank votes		2,597	6.28
Total votes		41,370	100.00
Registered voters/turnout		67,272	61.50
Majority		8,206	
CPN (UML) gain			
Source: Election Commission

==== 2013 Constituent Assembly election ====
Candidate	Party	Votes	%
Tek Bahadur Basnet	UCPN (Maoist)	15,089	37.03
Gulab Jang Shah	CPN (UML)	11,852	29.09
Dhruba Raj Puri	Nepali Congress	11,448	28.09
Bhim Bahadur Wali	CPN (Marxist–Leninist)	1,056	2.59
Others		1,303	3.20
Total		40,748	100.00
Valid votes		40,748	96.45
Invalid/blank votes		1,499	3.55
Total votes		42,247	100.00
Registered voters/turnout		51,349	82.27
Majority		3,237	
UCPN (Maoist) hold			
Source: Election Commission

=== Election in the 2000s ===
==== 2008 Constituent Assembly election ====
Candidate	Party	Votes	%
Tek Bahadur Basnet	CPN (Maoist)	27,421	55.25
Prakash Jwala	CPN (UML)	9,487	19.12
Dhruba Raj Puri	Nepali Congress	7,878	15.87
Yagyashwari Shah	Rastriya Prajatantra Party	2,908	5.86
Others		1,935	3.90
Total		49,629	100.00
Valid votes		49,629	96.76
Invalid/blank votes		1,661	3.24
Total votes		51,290	100.00
Registered voters/turnout		78,107	65.67
Majority		17,934	
CPN (Maoist) gain			
Source: Election Commission

=== Election in the 1990s ===
==== 1999 general election ====
Candidate	Party	Votes	%
Prakash Jwala	CPN (UML)	8,208	37.37
Rajendra Bahadur Shah	Nepali Congress	7,089	32.27
Gulab Jang Shah	CPN (Marxist–Leninist)	4,666	21.24
Others		2,002	9.11
Total		21,965	100.00
Valid votes		21,965	96.92
Invalid/blank votes		699	3.08
Total votes		22,664	100.00
Registered voters/turnout		57,314	39.54
Majority		1,119	
CPN (UML) gain			
Source: Election Commission

==== 1994 general election ====
Candidate	Party	Votes	%
Rajendra Bahadur Shah	Nepali Congress	11,714	40.67
Prakash Bohora	CPN (UML)	7,930	27.53
Bharat Puri	Independent	6,919	24.02
Keshar Singh Gharti	Rastriya Prajatantra Party	2,243	7.79
Total		28,806	100.00
Majority		3,784	
Nepali Congress hold			
Source: Election Commission

==== 1991 general election ====
Candidate	Party	Votes	%
Rajendra Bahadur Shah	Nepali Congress	17,097	73.09
-	CPN (UML)	6,295	26.91
Total		23,392	100.00
Majority		10,802	
Nepali Congress gain			

== See also ==
- List of parliamentary constituencies of Nepal
