= Chandra Bhandari =

Nepali politician

Chandra Kant Bhandari
- चन्द्रकान्त भण्डारी

Member of Parliament, House of Representatives
- In office 22 December 2022 – 12 September 2025
- Preceded by: Pradeep Gyawali
- Succeeded by: Sagar Dhakal
- Constituency: Gulmi 1

Member of 2nd Nepalese Constituent Assembly
- In office 21 January 2014 – 14 October 2017
- Preceded by: Pradeep Gyawali
- Succeeded by: Gokarna Bista
- Constituency: Gulmi 2

Vice President of the Nepali Congress
- Incumbent
- Assumed office 29 October 2026 Serving with Pushpa Bhusal Gautam, Binod Chaudhary, Madhu Prasad Acharya
- President: Gagan Thapa

Member of the Central Working Committee of Nepali Congress
- Incumbent
- Assumed office 21 September 2023

Personal details
- Born: Chandra Kant Bhandari; 9 June 1961 (age 65) Hunga-7, Gulmi, Nepal
- Party: Nepali Congress
- Occupation: Politician

Dr. Chandra Bhandari (Nepali: डा. चन्द्र भण्डारी; born Chandra Kant Bhandari, April 14, 1961) is a Nepalese politician serving as the Vice President of the Nepali Congress party. Bhandari also seved as the member of House of Representatives elected from Gulmi 1 through 2022 legislative election.

== Political life ==
Bhandari entered politics in 1976 and went on to become the general secretary of Nepal Students Union. In the 2006 revolution, he openly favored republicanism contrary to official party position. He contested the 2013 constituent assembly election from Gulmi-2 and won, defeating his long time rival Pradeep Gyawali by about 2,500 votes. He was defeated by CPN-UML candidate Pradeep Gyawali in the 1999 legislative election, in the 2008 CA Election and again later in the 2017 legislative election. In the 2022 Nepalese general election, he was elected as the member of the 2nd Federal Parliament of Nepal.

Bhandari was elected as Vice President of Nepali Congress in 15th general convention of the party.

== Education ==
He had achieved master's degree in sociology and management faculty and was pursuing his PhD, as of 2013. He later completed his PhD.
