= Krishna Kumar B.C. =

Nepalese politician

Krishna Kumar BC
- कृष्ण कुमार बि.सी.

Minister for Industry, Tourism, Forest and Environment
- Incumbent
- Assumed office 18 April 2023
- Governor: Tilak Pariyar

Member of Karnali Provincial Assembly
- Incumbent
- Assumed office 2022
- Preceded by: Amar Bahadur Thapa
- Constituency: Dailekh 1(B)

Personal details
- Born: Dailekh, Karnali, Nepal
- Party: Nepali Congress

Krishna Kumar BC (Nepali: कृष्ण कुमार बि.सी.) is a Nepali politician belonging to Nepali Congress. Singh is the current provincial assembly member from Dailekh 1(B). He is currently serving as the Minister for Industry, Tourism, Forest, and Environment of Karnali Province.

== Electoral history ==
=== 2022 Nepalese provincial elections ===
Candidate	Party	Votes	%
Krishna Kumar B.C.	Nepali Congress	10,545	47.44
Prem Bahadur Thapa	CPN (UML)	9,471	42.61
Rana Bahadur Singh	Rastriya Prajatantra Party	1,604	7.22
Others		608	2.74
Total		22,228	100.00
Majority		1,074	
Nepali Congress gain			
