= Navraj =

Navraj may refer to:

- Navraj Hans, Indian musical artist
- Nav (rapper) (Navraj Singh Goraya; born 1989), Canadian rapper, record producer, and singer

== See also ==
- Navaraj Rawat (born 1964), Nepali communist politician and member of the House of Representatives of the federal parliament of Nepal
- Nuvraj Bassi (born 1983), defensive tackle in the Canadian Football League
- Nav Raj Dhami, Nepalese politician
