= Gulmi 2 =

Parliamentary constituency in Lumbini Province, Nepal

- Parliamentary constituency
- Gulmi 2 in Lumbini Province
- Province: Lumbini Province
- District: Gulmi District

Current constituency
- Created: 1991
- Party: Rastriya Swatantra Party
- Member of Parliament: Govinda Panthi

Gulmi 2 one of two parliamentary constituencies of Gulmi District in Nepal. This constituency came into existence on the Constituency Delimitation Commission (CDC) report submitted on 31 August 2017.

== Incorporated areas ==
Gulmi 2 incorporates Madane Rural Municipality, Malika Rural Municipality, Dhurkot Rural Municipality, Isma Rural Municipality, Musikot Municipality and, wards 1–6 of Resunga Municipality.

== Assembly segments ==
It encompasses the following Lumbini Provincial Assembly segment

- Gulmi 2(A)
- Gulmi 2(B)

== Members of Parliament ==
=== Parliament/Constituent Assembly ===
Election	Member	Party
1991	Bhagwat Gyawali	Nepali Congress
1994	Kamal Raj Shrestha	CPN (UML)
1999	Pradeep Kumar Gyawali	CPN (UML)
2013	Chandra Kant Bhandari	Nepali Congress
2017	Gokarna Bista	CPN (UML)
May 2018	Gokarna Bista	Nepal Communist Party
March 2021	Gokarna Bista	CPN (UML)
2026	Govinda Panthi	Rastriya Swatantra Party

=== Provincial Assembly ===
==== 1(A) ====
Election	Member	Party
2017	Dilli Raj Bhusal	CPN (Unified Marxist-Leninist)
May 2018	Dilli Raj Bhusal	Nepal Communist Party

==== 1(B) ====
Election	Member	Party
2017	Dinesh Panthi	CPN (Maoist Centre)
May 2018	Dinesh Panthi	Nepal Communist Party

== Election results ==
=== Election in the 2020s ===
==== 2022 general election ====
Candidate	Party	Votes	%
Gokarna Bista	CPN (UML)	28,476	50.32
Ram Kumari Jhakri	CPN (Unified Socialist)	26,441	46.72
Others		1,676	2.96
Total		56,593	100.00
Majority		2,035	
CPN (UML) hold			

=== Election in the 2010s ===
==== 2017 legislative elections ====
Party	Candidate	Votes
CPN (Unified Marxist–Leninist)	Gokarna Bista	34,618
Nepali Congress	Chandra Bahadur K.C.	20,157
Others		1,076
Invalid votes		2,199
Result	CPN (UML) gain	
Source: Election Commission

==== 2017 Nepalese provincial elections ====
===== 1(A) =====
Party	Candidate	Votes
CPN (Unified Marxist–Leninist)	Khadga Bahadur Khatri	16,165
Nepali Congress	Shalikram Panthi	11,673
Others		334
Invalid votes		645
Result	CPN (UML) gain	
Source: Election Commission

===== 1(B) =====
Party	Candidate	Votes
CPN (Maoist Centre)	Dinesh Panthi	17,601
Nepali Congress	Chhant Bahadur Paharai Magar	9,639
Others		846
Invalid votes		1,089
Result	Maoist Centre gain	
Source: Election Commission

==== 2013 Constituent Assembly election ====
Party	Candidate	Votes
Nepali Congress	Chandra Kant Bhandari	21,189
CPN (Unified Marxist–Leninist)	Pradeep Kumar Gyawali	18,681
UCPN (Maoist)	Ashok Thapa	4,531
Others		1,155
Result	Congress gain	
Source: NepalNews

=== Election in the 2000s ===
==== 2008 Constituent Assembly election ====
Party	Candidate	Votes
CPN (Unified Marxist–Leninist)	Pradeep Kumar Gyawali	23,253
Nepali Congress	Chandra Kant Bhandari	21,101
CPN (Maoist)	Nim Bahadur Pandey	7,321
Others		2,211
Invalid votes		2,168
Result	CPN (UML) hold	
Source: Election Commission

=== Election in the 1990s ===
==== 1999 legislative elections ====
Party	Candidate	Votes
CPN (Unified Marxist–Leninist)	Pradeep Kumar Gyawali	24,345
Nepali Congress	Chandra Bahadur K.C.	23,669
CPN (Marxist–Leninist)	Tej Prasad Kandel	1,640
Others		1,184
Invalid votes		1,201
Result	CPN (UML) hold	
Source: Election Commission

==== 1994 legislative elections ====
Party	Candidate	Votes
CPN (Unified Marxist–Leninist)	Kamal Raj Shrestha	25,651
Nepali Congress	Bhagwat Gyawali	19,872
Rastriya Prajatantra Party	Ashok Shrestha	1,260
Others		1,382
Result	CPN (UML) gain	
Source: Election Commission

==== 1991 legislative elections ====
Party	Candidate	Votes
Nepali Congress	Bhagwat Gyawali	22,364
CPN (Unified Marxist–Leninist)		21,011
Result	Congress gain	

== See also ==
- List of parliamentary constituencies of Nepal
- Gulmi 1
