= Basana Thapa =

Nepalese politician and Hotelier

Honourable Basana Thapa
- बासना थापा

Member of Parliament, House of Representatives
- Incumbent
- Assumed office 26 March 2026
- Preceded by: Amar Bahadur Thapa
- Constituency: Dailekh 1

Chief Whip for Nepali Congress, 7th House of Representatives
- Incumbent
- Assumed office 27 April 2026

Personal details
- Born: 28 May 1980 (age 46) Kathmandu District, Nepal
- Citizenship: Nepali
- Party: Nepali Congress
- Parent: Hom Bikram Thapa (father)
- Profession: Politician; Hotelier

Basana Thapa (Nepali: बासना थापा) is a Nepalese politician and a member of the Nepali Congress. She was elected to the House of Representatives from the Dailekh-1 constituency. She is the first woman to win a directly elected federal parliamentary seat from Karnali Province.

== Early life and background ==
Basana Thapa was born in Dailekh District of Karnali Province, Nepal. She has been involved in social and political activities, particularly focusing on women's participation in politics and community development.

== Political career ==
Thapa is affiliated with the Nepali Congress, one of Nepal's major political parties. She rose through the party ranks at the district level and became active in organizing political activities in Dailekh.

Her candidacy in the federal parliamentary elections was seen as part of the Nepali Congress's effort to promote women leaders in direct elections, which have historically been dominated by men.

=== 2026 general election ===
In the 2026 Nepalese general election, Thapa contested from Dailekh-1 under the first-past-the-post electoral system. She defeated an experienced political opponent to win the seat.

Her victory was considered significant for several reasons. She became the first woman to win a directly elected federal parliamentary seat from Karnali Province. She was also reported to be the only female candidate from the Nepali Congress to win a direct election seat in that election cycle.

== Significance ==
Thapa's election is seen as a milestone for women's representation in Nepalese politics, especially in Karnali Province, where female participation in direct elections has been historically low.

== See also ==
- Nepali Congress
- House of Representatives (Nepal)
- 2026 Nepalese general election
