= Ruru =

Ruru may refer to:

== Places ==
- Ruru, Nepal
- Ruru, New Zealand

== People ==
- Rouran, an ancient nomadic race from the Mongolian steppes, also called Juan Juan
- Ruru Madrid (born 1997), a Filipino actor
- Ruru (Ikshvaku King), an ancient king; see List of Ikshvaku dynasty kings in Hinduism

== Others ==
- Māori name for the morepork owl
- Ruru Amour (ルールー・アムール), a character from Hugtto! PreCure
