= Sagar Dhakal (Nepalese politician) =

Nepalese politician

- सागर ढकाल

Member of the House of Representatives
- Incumbent
- Assumed office 26 March 2026
- Preceded by: Chandra Kant Bhandari
- Constituency: Gulmi 1

Personal details
- Born: 12 July 1991 (age 35) Gulmi District, Nepal
- Citizenship: Nepalese
- Party: Rastriya Swatantra (since 2025)
- Other political affiliations: Independent (until 2025)
- Parent: Topraj Dhakal (father)
- Education: Water resource policy (Msc)
- Alma mater: Regent's Park College, Oxford
- Profession: Politician, Engineer

Sagar Dhakal (Note: Nepali: सागर ढकाल) (born 12 July 1991) is a Nepalese politician serving as a member of parliament from the Rastriya Swatantra Party. He is the member of the 3rd Federal Parliament of Nepal elected from Gulmi 1 constituency in 2026 Nepalese General Election securing 29,642 votes and defeating Pradeep Gyawali of the CPN UML and Chandra Bhandari of the Nepali Congress. He is a member of the Rastriya Swatantra Party's central committee .

== Early life and education ==
Dhakal completed his MSc in Water Science, Policy and Management from Regent's Park College, Oxford in 2018.

== Political career ==
Dhakal contested the 2022 general election as an independent in Dadeldhura 1 but lost. He joined the Rastriya Swatantra Party after the 2025 Nepalese Gen Z protests. In 2026 elections, Sagar Dhakal secured a seat by gaining 29,642 votes, while Gyawali secured just 15,181 votes.
