= Gopal Bahadur Bam =

Nepalese politician

- गोपाल बहादुर बम

Member of Parliament, Pratinidhi Sabha
- In office 4 March 2018 – 18 September 2022
- Preceded by: Mohan Baniya
- Succeeded by: Aain Bahadur Shahi Thakuri
- Constituency: Mugu 1

Personal details
- Born: 18 June 1971 (age 54)
- Party: CPN (Unified Socialist)
- Other political affiliations: NMKP; CPN (UML)

Gopal Bahadur Bam is a Nepalese politician serving as the Member Of House Of Representatives (Nepal) elected from Mugu-1, Province No. 6. He is a member of the CPN (Unified Socialist).
