= Naresh Kumar Shahi =

Nepalese politician

Honourable Naresh Kumar Shahi
- नरेश कुमार शाही

Minister for Economic Affairs of Sudurpashchim Province
- In office 10 February 2023 – 7 March 2024
- Governor: Dev Raj Joshi
- Chief Minister: Kamal Bahadur Shah
- Preceded by: Prakash Rawal
- Succeeded by: Ghanshyam Chaudhary

Member of the Sudurpashchim Provincial Assembly
- Incumbent
- Assumed office 30 December 2022
- Preceded by: Bal Dev Regmi
- Constituency: Bajura 1 (A)

Chairman of Youth Federation Nepal
- Incumbent
- Assumed office 18 August 2021
- Preceded by: Position created

Personal details
- Born: Bajura, Nepal
- Party: Nepali Communist Party
- Other political affiliations: Communist Party of Nepal (Unified Marxist–Leninist); Nepal Communist Party; Communist Party of Nepal (Unified Socialist)

Naresh Kumar Shahi (Nepali: नरेश कुमार शाही) is a Nepalese politician belonging to Unified Socialist Reorganization Campaign. Shahi is also serving as a member of Sudurpashchim Provincial Assembly.

Shahi also served as the Minister for Economic Affairs of Sudurpashchim Province. Shahi chaired the Youth Federation Nepal.

== See also ==
- Unified Socialist Reorganization Campaign
- Youth Federation Nepal
