= Tek Bahadur Basnet =

Nepali politician

- टेक बहादुर बस्नेत

Member of Parliament, Pratinidhi Sabha
- Incumbent
- Assumed office 4 March 2018
- Constituency: Salyan 1

Member of 1st and 2nd Constituent Assembly
- In office 28 May 2008 – 14 October 2017
- Preceded by: Prakash Jwala
- Constituency: Salyan 1

Personal details
- Born: 17 September 1965 (age 60) Salyan District
- Party: CPN (Maoist Centre)
- Other political affiliations: CPN (Mashal)

Tek Bahadur Basnet (Nepali: टेकबहादुर बस्नेत) is a Nepalese politician, belonging to the Communist Party of Nepal (Maoist). In the 2008 Constituent Assembly election, he was elected from the Salyan-1 constituency, gaining 27,421 votes against Prakash Jwala.
