= Pramesh Kumar Hamal =

Nepali politician

- प्रमेश कुमार हमाल
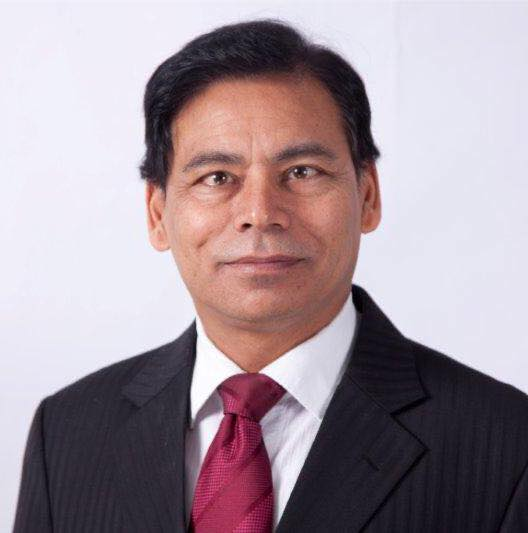

Deputy chairman of CPN (Unified Socialist)
- Incumbent
- Assumed office 2021

Personal details
- Party: CPN (Unified Socialist)

Pramesh Kumar Hamal (Nepali: प्रमेश कुमार हमाल) is a Nepalese politician belonging to CPN (Unified Socialist). He is also the Vice-president of the party.

Formerly, a member of the CPN (UML), Hamal entered politics in 1976. He has served in diplomatic posts at various point of time.
