= Dailekh 1 =

Parliamentary constituency in Nepal

- Parliamentary constituency for the House of Representatives
- Dailekh 1 in Karnali Province

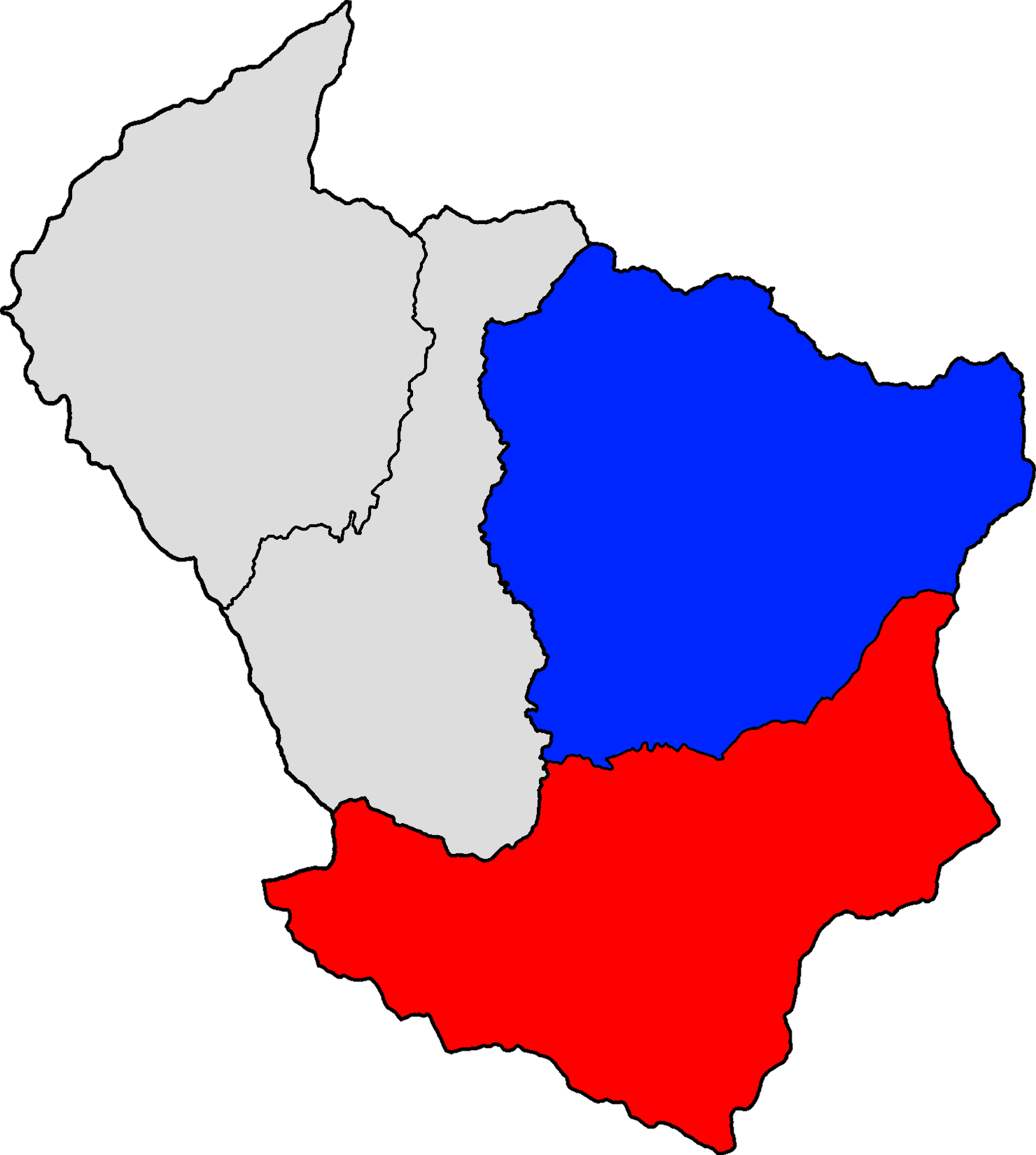
- Assembly segments Dailekh 1(A) (red) and Dailekh 1(B) (blue) within Dailekh District
- Province: Karnali Province
- District: Dailekh District
- Electorate: 79,701

Current constituency
- Created: 1991
- Number of members: 3
- Member of Parliament: Basana Thapa, Nepali Congress
- Karnali MPA 1(A): Purna Bahadur Khatri, Congress
- Karnali MPA 1(B): Krishna Kumar B.C., Congress

Dailekh 1 is one of two parliamentary constituencies of Dailekh District in Nepal. This constituency came into existence on the Constituency Delimitation Commission (CDC) report submitted on 31 August 2017.

== Incorporated areas ==
Dailekh 1 incorporates Gurans Rural Municipality, Dungeshwor Rural Municipality, Bhagwatimai Rural Municipality, Narayan Municipality, Naumule Rural Municipality and Mahabu Rural Municipality.

== Assembly segments ==
It encompasses the following Karnali Provincial Assembly segment

- Dailekh 1(A)
- Dailekh 1(B)

== Members of Parliament ==
=== Parliament/Constituent Assembly ===
Election	Member	Party
1991	Ganesh Bahadur Khadka	Nepali Congress
1999	Nar Bahadur Hamal	CPN (UML)
2008	Ganesh Bahadur Khadka	Nepali Congress
2013	Amar Bahadur Thapa	CPN (UML)
2017	Rabindra Raj Sharma	CPN (UML)
May 2018	Rabindra Raj Sharma	Nepal Communist Party
March 2021	Rabindra Raj Sharma	CPN (UML)
2022	Amar Bahadur Thapa	Unified Socialist
2026	Basana Thapa	Congress

=== Provincial Assembly ===
==== 1(A) ====
Election	Member	Party
2017	Dharma Raj Regmi	CPN (Maoist Centre)
May 2018	Dharma Raj Regmi	Nepal Communist Party
March 2021	Dharma Raj Regmi	CPN (Maoist Centre)
2022	Purna Bahadur Khatri	Nepali Congress

==== 1(B) ====
Election	Member	Party
2017	Amar Bahadur Thapa	CPN (UML)
May 2018	Amar Bahadur Thapa	Nepal Communist Party
March 2021	Amar Bahadur Thapa	CPN (UML)
2022	Krishna Kumar B.C.	Nepali Congress

== Election results ==
=== Election in the 2020s ===
==== 2026 general election ====
Candidate	Party	Votes	%
Basana Thapa	Nepali Congress	12,372	32.38
Rabindra Raj Sharma	CPN (UML)	11,796	30.87
Nanda Kishor Basnet	Rastriya Swatantra Party	8,151	21.33
Amar Bahadur Thapa	Nepali Communist Party	4,256	11.14
Rana Bahadur Singh	Rastriya Prajatantra Party	598	1.57
Jagat Bahadur Oli	Nepal Majdoor Kisan Party	598	1.57
Ramlal Bishwokarma	Communist Party of Nepal (Maoist)	302	0.79
Nara Bahadur Singh	Rastriya Janamorcha	91	0.24
Log Bahadur Bogati	Independent	29	0.08
Menuka Shrestha	Aam Janata Party	16	0.04
Total		38,209	100.00
Valid votes		38,209	94.83
Invalid/blank votes		2,081	5.17
Total votes		40,290	100.00
Registered voters/turnout		79,701	50.55
Majority		576	
Nepali Congress gain			

==== 2022 general election ====
Candidate	Party	Votes	%
Amar Bahadur Thapa	CPN (Unified Socialist)	18,256	43.75
Rabindra Raj Sharma	CPN (UML)	17,407	41.71
Kunti Kumari Shahi	Rastriya Prajatantra Party	4,602	11.03
Prakash Gurung	Nepal Workers Peasants Party	698	1.67
Indra Prasad Sharma	Rastriya Swatantra Party	387	0.93
Gopal Nepali	Independent	210	0.50
Nirakh Bahadur Thapa	Independent	106	0.25
Bhupal Bahadur Thapa	Nepali Congress (BP)	66	0.16
Total		41,732	100.00
Valid votes		41,732	96.18
Invalid/blank votes		1,657	3.82
Total votes		43,389	100.00
Majority		849	
CPN (Unified Socialist) gain			

==== 2022 provincial election ====
===== 1(A) =====
Candidate	Party	Votes	%
Purna Bahadur Khatri	Nepali Congress	9,482	48.93
Dharmaraj Regmi	CPN (UML)	8,098	41.79
Hridayaraj Shahi	Rastriya Prajatantra Party	1,081	5.58
Others		716	3.70
Total		19,377	100.00
Majority		1,384	
Nepali Congress gain			

===== 1(B) =====
Candidate	Party	Votes	%
Krishna Kumar B.C.	Nepali Congress	10,545	47.44
Prem Bahadur Thapa	CPN (UML)	9,471	42.61
Rana Bahadur Singh	Rastriya Prajatantra Party	1,604	7.22
Others		608	2.74
Total		22,228	100.00
Majority		1,074	
Nepali Congress gain			

=== Election in the 2010s ===
==== 2017 general election ====
Candidate	Party	Votes	%
Rabindra Raj Sharma	CPN (UML)	23,773	55.51
Deepak Kumar Shahi	Rastriya Prajatantra Party	17,252	40.28
Others		1,805	4.21
Total		42,830	100.00
Valid votes		42,830	94.14
Invalid/blank votes		2,666	5.86
Total votes		45,496	100.00
Registered voters/turnout		70,190	64.82
Majority		6,521	
CPN (UML) hold			
Source: Election Commission

==== 2017 provincial election ====
===== 1(A) =====
Candidate	Party	Votes	%
Dharma Raj Regmi	CPN (Maoist Centre)	10,361	52.42
Krishna Kumar B.C.	Nepali Congress	8,765	44.34
Others		641	3.24
Total		19,767	100.00
Valid votes		19,767	96.00
Invalid/blank votes		824	4.00
Total votes		20,591	100.00
Registered voters/turnout		31,835	64.68
Majority		1,596	
CPN (Maoist Centre) gain			
Source: Election Commission

===== 1(B) =====
Candidate	Party	Votes	%
Amar Bahadur Thapa	CPN (UML)	12,567	53.11
Jagat Jang Thapa	Nepali Congress	10,586	44.73
Others		511	2.16
Total		23,664	100.00
Valid votes		23,664	95.68
Invalid/blank votes		1,069	4.32
Total votes		24,733	100.00
Registered voters/turnout		38,355	64.48
Majority		1,981	
CPN (UML) gain			
Source: Election Commission

==== 2013 Constituent Assembly election ====
Candidate	Party	Votes	%
Amar Bahadur Thapa	CPN (UML)	15,670	37.61
Ganesh Bahadur Khadka	Nepali Congress	11,894	28.55
Tej Bahadur Chand	UCPN (Maoist)	7,045	16.91
Bhakta Bahadur Shahi	Rastriya Prajatantra Party Nepal	2,033	4.88
Nar Singh Malla	Independent	1,977	4.75
Others		3,043	7.30
Total		41,662	100.00
Valid votes		41,662	94.30
Invalid/blank votes		2,518	5.70
Total votes		44,180	100.00
Registered voters/turnout		57,626	76.67
Majority		3,776	
CPN (UML) gain			
Source: Election Commission

=== Election in the 2000s ===
==== 2008 Constituent Assembly election ====
Candidate	Party	Votes	%
Ganesh Bahadur Khadka	Nepali Congress	16,280	34.30
Amar Bahadur Thapa	CPN (UML)	14,151	29.81
Karna Bahadur Basnet	CPN (Maoist)	12,536	26.41
Narma Kumari Guru	Nepal Workers Peasants Party	1,667	3.51
Others		2,829	5.96
Total		47,463	100.00
Valid votes		47,463	95.60
Invalid/blank votes		2,183	4.40
Total votes		49,646	100.00
Registered voters/turnout		82,163	60.42
Majority		2,129	
Nepali Congress gain			
Source: Election Commission

=== Election in the 1990s ===
==== 1999 general election ====
Candidate	Party	Votes	%
Nar Bahadur Hamal	CPN (UML)	17,047	40.47
Ganesh Bahadur Khadka	Nepali Congress	15,765	37.42
Bhakta Bahadur Shahi	Rastriya Prajatantra Party	5,091	12.09
Ratna Bahadur Shrestha	Nepal Workers Peasants Party	1,217	2.89
Tek Bahadur Thapa	Rastriya Janamukti Party	1,074	2.55
Others		1,932	4.59
Total		42,126	100.00
Valid votes		42,126	98.58
Invalid/blank votes		607	1.42
Total votes		42,733	100.00
Registered voters/turnout		65,538	65.20
Majority		1,282	
CPN (UML) gain			
Source: Election Commission

==== 1994 general election ====
Candidate	Party	Votes	%
Ganesh Bahadur Khadka	Nepali Congress	10,695	32.30
Rang Nath Joshi	Nepal Workers Peasants Party	8,508	25.69
Dan Bahadur Shahi	Rastriya Prajatantra Party	6,960	21.02
Rabindra Raj Sharma	CPN (UML)	4,530	13.68
Others		2,421	7.31
Total		33,114	100.00
Majority		2,187	
Nepali Congress hold			
Source: Election Commission

==== 1991 general election ====
Candidate	Party	Votes	%
Ganesh Bahadur Khadka	Nepali Congress	13,467	54.45
Mani Ram Regmi	Nepal Workers Peasants Party	11,264	45.55
Total		24,731	100.00
Majority		2,203	
Nepali Congress gain			

== See also ==
- List of parliamentary constituencies of Nepal
