= Ghanshyam Chaudhary =

Nepalese politician (born 1986)

Honourable Ghanshyam Chaudhary
- घनश्‍याम चौधरी

Minister for Economic Affairs of Sudurpashchim Province
- In office 9 March 2024 – 17 April 2024
- Governor: Dev Raj Joshi; Najir Miya
- Chief Minister: Kamal Bahadur Shah
- Preceded by: Naresh Kumar Shahi
- Succeeded by: Surendra Bahadur Pal
Committee positions
Chairperson of the Sudurpashchim Provincial Assembly Committee on Economic Development and Natural Resources
Incumbent
Assumed office 16 February 2025
Preceded by	Himself
In office 10 January 2024 – 9 March 2024
Preceded by	Hark Bahadur Kunwar
Succeeded by	Himself

Member of the Sudurpashchim Provincial Assembly
- Incumbent
- Assumed office 30 December 2022
- Preceded by: Bir Man Chaudhari
- Constituency: Kailali 3 (A)

Personal details
- Born: 20 December 1986 (age 39) Bhajani, Kailali District, Nepal
- Party: Nepali Communist Party
- Other political affiliations: Nagrik Unmukti Party
- Profession: Politician; Sports; Business

Ghanshyam Chaudhary (Nepali: घनश्‍याम चौधरी) is a Nepalese politician and currently serving as a member of the Sudurpashchim Provincial Assembly since 30 December 2022, having won the 2022 Nepalese provincial election from Kailali 3 (A) constituency. Chaudhary is also serving as the Chairperson of the Provincial Assembly Committee on Economic Development and Natural Resources since February 2025, having previously held the role from January 2024 to March 2024. Chaudhary has previously served as the Minister for Economic Affairs from March to April 2024.

== Electoral history ==
=== 2022 provincial elections ===
==== Kailali 3 (A) ====
Candidate	Party	Votes	%
Ghanshyam Chaudhary	Nagrik Unmukti Party	13,923	43.09
Khem Raj D. Tharu	Nepali Congress	11,572	35.82
Raj Bahadur Budha	CPN (UML)	4,631	14.33
Chulhu Ram Chaudhary	Rastriya Prajatantra Party	1,853	5.74
Others		330	1.02
Total		32,309	100.00
Majority		2,351	
Nagrik Unmukti Party hold			
