= Kedar Neupane =

Nepalese politician

- केदार न्यौपाने

Deputy chairman of CPN (Unified Socialist)
- Incumbent
- Assumed office 23 September 2021
- Preceded by: Position created

Personal details
- Party: CPN (Unified Socialist)

Kedar Prasad Neupane (Nepali: केदारप्रसाद न्यौपाने) is a Nepalese politician. He is vice chairperson of the CPN (Unified Socialist).

In 1999, he was elected to the upper house of the Nepalese parliament.

Neupane was the number five candidate of CPN(UML) in the proportional representation list for the Constituent Assembly election.
