= Aain Bahadur Shahi Thakuri =

Nepalese politician

Honourable Ain Bahadur Shahi Thakuri
- ऐन बहादुर शाही ठकुरी

Minister of Forests and Environment of Nepal
- In office 15 July 2024 – 9 September 2025
- President: Ram Chandra Poudel
- Prime Minister: Khadga Prasad Sharma Oli
- Preceded by: Nawal Kishor Sah

Member of Parliament, Pratinidhi Sabha
- In office 22 December 2022 – 12 September 2025
- Preceded by: Gopal Bahadur Bam
- Constituency: Mugu 1

Personal details
- Born: 28 January 1970 (age 56)
- Party: Nepali Congress
- Spouse: Basuna Shahi Thakuri
- Parents: Krishna Bahadur Shahi Thakuri (father); Tara Devi Shahi (mother)

Ain Bahadur Shahi Thakuri is a Nepalese politician, belonging to the Nepali Congress who served as the Minister of Forests and Environment in the cabinet led by Prime Minister KP Sharma Oli. He is also serving a member of the 2nd Federal Parliament of Nepal. In the 2022 Nepalese general election, he won the election from Mugu 1 (constituency).
