= Rama Gharti =

Nepalese politician

Honourable Rama Gharti
- रमा घर्ती

Minister for Law, Women, Children and Senior Citizens of Lumbini Province
- Incumbent
- Assumed office 10 October 2021
- Preceded by: Position created

Member of Provincial Assembly of Lumbini Province
- Incumbent
- Assumed office 2017
- President: Bidya Devi Bhandari
- Prime Minister: Sher Bahadur Deuba
- Constituency: Proportional list

Personal details
- Born: Palpa, Nepal
- Party: CPN (Unified Socialist)

Rama Gharti (Nepali: रमा घर्ती) is a Nepalese politician belonging to CPN (Unified Socialist). She is also serving as member of Provincial Assembly of Lumbini Province.

She is currently serving as Minister for Law, Women, Children and Senior Citizens of Lumbini Province.

== See also ==
- CPN (Unified Socialist)
- Som Prasad Pandey
