= Kaike Rural Municipality =

Rural Municipality in Karnali Province, Nepal

Kaike काईके गाउँपालिका
- Rural Municipality
- Location in Nepal
- Coordinates: 28.84°N 83.06°E
- Country: Nepal
- Province: Karnali Province
- District: Dolpa
- Wards: 7
- Established: 10 March 2017

Government
  - Type: Rural Council
  - Chairperson: Mr.Angad Rana (NCP)
  - Vice-chairperson: Mr.Kunjang Budha (RPP)

Area
  - Total: 466.6 km^{2} (180.2 sq mi)

Population (2011)
  - Total: 3,576
  - Density: 7.664/km^{2} (19.85/sq mi)
- Time zone: UTC+5:45 (NST)
- Headquarter: Sahartara
- Website: kaikemun.gov.np

Kaike (Nepali: काईके गाउँपालिका) is a rural municipality located in Dolpa District of Karnali Province of Nepal.

The rural municipality is divided into total 7 wards and the headquarters of the rural municipality is situated at Sahartara.

== Demographics ==
At the time of the 2011 Nepal census, 42.0% of the population in Kaike Rural Municipality spoke Magar, 37.1% Bote, 16.3% Nepali, 1.7% Gurung, 1.7% Sherpa and 1.2% Tamang as their first language.

In terms of ethnicity/caste, 79.6% were Magar, 11.6% Kami, 2.9% Tamang, 2.2% Chhetri, 1.8% Gurung, 0.9% Thakuri, 0.7% Hill Brahmin and 0.3% others.

In terms of religion, 83.1% were Buddhist and 16.9% Hindu.
