= Rabindra Raj Sharma =

Nepalese politician

- रविन्द्र राज शर्मा

Member of Parliament, Pratinidhi Sabha
- In office 4 March 2018 – 18 September 2022
- Preceded by: Amar Bahadur Thapa
- Constituency: Dailekh 1

Personal details
- Born: 25 September 1964 (age 61)
- Party: CPN (UML)

Rabindra Raj Sharma is a Nepalese politician, belonging to the Nepal Communist Party currently serving as the member of the 1st Federal Parliament of Nepal. In the 2017 Nepalese general election he was elected from the Dailekh 1 constituency, securing 23773 (55.51%) votes.
