= Yuwa Sangh Nepal =

Youth wing of the CPN (Unified Socialist)

Youth Federation Nepal युवा संघ, नेपाल
- Founded: 18 August 2021 (5 years ago)
- Headquarters: Kathmandu
- Membership: 51,784
- Ideology: Marxist-Leninist; Socialist; Left-wing nationalism Youth rights
- Mother party: Communist Party of Nepal (Unified Socialist)

Youth Federation Nepal (Nepali: युवा संघ, नेपाल) is the youth wing of Communist Party of Nepal (Unified Socialist). The organization is one of the most influential youth organizations in Nepal with working level committees in all districts.

Roshan Thapa is the Current chair of Youth Federation Nepal.

== See also ==
- Communist Party of Nepal (Unified Socialist)
- All Nepal National Free Students Union
