= Ratneshwar Goit Yadav =

Nepalese politician

Honourable Ratneshwar Goit Yadav
- रत्नेश्वर गोइत यादव

Madhesh Provincial Assembly member
- Incumbent
- Assumed office 2022
- Preceded by: N/A
- Constituency: Party list

Personal details
- Party: CPN (Unified Socialist)
- Occupation: Politician

Ratneshwar Goit Yadav (Nepali: रत्नेश्वर गोइत यादव) is a Nepalese politician. Yadav is a member of Provincial Assembly of Madhesh Province from CPN (Unified Socialist). Yadav was elected via 2022 Nepalese provincial elections from CPN (Unified Socialist) party list.
