= Rama Ale Magar =

- रमा आले मगर

Member of the Bagmati Provincial Assembly
- Incumbent
- Assumed office 1 February 2018
- Constituency: Kathmandu 10 (B)

Personal details
- Party: Communist Party of Nepal (Unified Socialist)

Rama Ale Magar (Nepali:रमा आले मगर) is a Nepalese politician who serves as a member of the Bagmati Provincial Assembly. She was elected from Kathmandu 10 (B) constituency.

In September 2026, she was appointed minister for Agriculture, Livestock, Forest and Environment in the Bagmati Provincial Cabinet.

== See also ==
- CPN (Unified Socialist)
