= Hark Bahadur Kunwar =

Nepalese politician

- हर्क बहादुर कुँवर

Chairperson of the Sudurpashchim Provincial Assembly Committee on Economic Development and Natural Resources
- In office 8 September 2018 – 17 September 2022
- Preceded by: Office established
- Succeeded by: Ghanshyam Chaudhary

Member of the Sudurpashchim Provincial Assembly
- In office 21 January 2018 – 17 September 2022
- Preceded by: Constituency established
- Succeeded by: Megh Raj Khadka
- Constituency: Achham 1 (A)

Personal details
- Party: Communist Party of Nepal (Unified Marxist–Leninist)
- Other political affiliations: Nepal Communist Party
- Profession: Politician

Hark Bahadur Kunwar (Nepali: हर्क बहादुर कुँवर) is a Nepalese politician who had served as the Chairperson of the Provincial Assembly Committee on Economic Development and Natural Resources. Kunwar also serves as a member of the member of the Sudurpashchim Provincial Assembly, having won the 2017 Nepalese provincial election from Achham 1 (A) constituency.

== Electoral history ==
=== 2017 provincial election ===
==== Achham 1(A) ====
Candidate	Party	Votes	%
Harka Bahadur Kunwar	CPN (UML)	10,710	53.53
Megh Raj Khadka	Nepali Congress	9,298	46.47
Total		20,008	100.00
Valid votes		20,008	97.74
Invalid/blank votes		463	2.26
Total votes		20,471	100.00
Majority		1,412	
CPN (UML) gain			
Source: Election Commission
