= Rajendra Man Shrestha =

Nepalese politician

- राजेन्द्रमान श्रेष्ठ

Member of the Bagmati Provincial Assembly
- Incumbent
- Assumed office 1 February 2018
- Constituency: Bhaktapur 2 (B)

Personal details
- Party: Communist Party of Nepal (Unified Socialist)

Rajendra Man Shrestha (Nepali:राजेन्द्रमान श्रेष्ठ) is a Nepalese politician who serves as a member of the Bagmati Provincial Assembly. Shrestha was elected from Bhaktapur 2 (B) constituency.

== See also ==
- CPN (Unified Socialist)
