= Govinda Panthi =

Nepalese politician

The Honourable Govinda Panthi
- गोविन्द पन्थी

Member of Parliament, Pratinidhi Sabha
- Incumbent
- Assumed office 26 March 2026
- Preceded by: Gokarna Bista
- Constituency: Gulmi 2

Personal details
- Citizenship: Nepalese
- Party: Rastriya Swatantra Party
- Education: Nepal Law Campus (LLB)
- Profession: Politician

Govinda Panthi (Nepali: गोविन्द पन्थी) is a Nepalese politician serving as a member of parliament from the Rastriya Swatantra Party. He is the member of the 7th Pratinidhi Sabha elected from Gulmi 2 constituency in 2026 Nepalese General Election securing 16,967 votes and defeating his closest contender Gokarna Bista of the CPN UML. He holds bachelor of laws from Nepal Law Campus.
