= Integrated Centre of Trade Unions, Nepal =

Nepali trade union center

ICTU
- Integrated Centre of Trade Unions, Nepal
- एकीकृत ट्रेड यूनियन महासंघ
- Founded: 2021
- Type: Trade union
- Headquarters: Kathmandu, Nepal
- Location: Nepal
- Key people: Deepak Paudel, Secretary General
- Website: ictunepal.org

Integrated Centre of Trade Unions, Nepal (ICTU) (Nepali: एकीकृत ट्रेड यूनियन महासंघ) is a confederation of 18 national trade union federations. It is affiliated with the Communist Party of Nepal (Unified Socialist).

Trade unions have existed in Nepal since the All Nepal Trade Union Congress was formed in 1946, but only really came into power after the collapse of the Rana dynasty in 1951 and the movement towards democracy. ICTU was established in 2021 during a split in the Communist Party of Nepal (Unified Marxist–Leninist).

== Sector union ==
- Unified Nepal's Government Employees' Organisation (एकीकृत सरकारी कर्मचारी संगठन नेपाल)
- All Nepal Peasants Association (अखिल नेपाल किसान महासंघ)
- Nepal National Teachers Association (नेपाल राष्ट्रिय शिक्षक संघ)

== See also ==
- Communist Party of Nepal (Unified Socialist)
- Nepal Trade Union Congress
