= Sudarshan Baral =

Nepali politician

- सुदर्शन बराल

Member of Constituent Assembly
- Incumbent
- Assumed office 2008
- Constituency: Gulmi-1
- Majority: 27421 votes.

Personal details
- Party: Communist Party of Nepal (Maoist)
- Spouse: Lila Thapa Baral
- Children: 1
- Profession: Social Development Minister at provience 5

Sudarshan Baral is a Nepalese politician, belonging to the Communist Party of Nepal (Maoist). He was arrested in October 2004. In 2007, he was appointed to the interim parliament.

In the 2008 Constituent Assembly election he was elected from the Gulmi-1 constituency, winning 14165 votes.
