= Dharmanath Prasad Sah =

Nepali politician

- धर्मनाथ प्रसाद साह

Deputy Chairman of CPN (Unified Socialist)
- Incumbent
- Assumed office 23 September 2021
- Preceded by: Position created

Minister for General Administration
- In office 2006–2008
- Monarch: Gyanendra of Nepal
- Prime Minister: Girija Prasad Koirala

Member of Constituent Assembly
- In office 2013–2017
- Constituency: Party list

Member of Pratinidhi Sabha
- In office 1999–2004
- Monarch: Birendra of Nepal
- Prime Minister: Sher Bahadur Deuba
- Constituency: Siraha 5

Personal details
- Born: Siraha, Nepal
- Party: CPN (Unified Socialist)

Dharmanath Prasad Sah (Nepali: धर्म नाथ प्रसाद साह) is a Nepali politician and a current Deputy chairman of CPN (Unified Socialist). Sah is the former Minister for General Administration of Nepal.

He is also former member of Pratinidhi Sabha from Siraha 5.
