= Laxman Lamsal =

Nepalese politician

- लक्ष्मण लम्साल

Member of the Bagmati Provincial Assembly
- Incumbent
- Assumed office 1 February 2018
- Constituency: Kavrepalanchowk 2 (B)

Personal details
- Party: Unified Socialist Reorganization Campaign
- Other political affiliations: Communist Party of Nepal (Unified Socialist) (till 2025)

Laxman Lamsal (Nepali:लक्ष्मण लम्साल) is a Nepalese politician who serves as a member of the Bagmati Provincial Assembly. Lamsal was elected from Kavrepalanchowk 2 (B) constituency.

== See also ==
- Unified Socialist Reorganization Campaign
