= Rajendra Laxmi Gaire =

Nepalese politician

- राजेन्द्र लक्ष्मी गैरे

Memberof Communist Party of Nepal (Unified Marxist-Leninist)
- Incumbent
- Assumed office 23 September 2021
- Preceded by: Position created

Member of Rastriya Sabha
- Incumbent
- Assumed office 2022
- Prime Minister: Sher Bahadur Deuba

Personal details
- Party: Communist Party of Nepal (Unified Marxist-Leninist)

Rajendra Laxmi Gaire (Nepali: राजेन्द्र लक्ष्मी गैरे) is a Nepalese politician and party member of Communist Party of Nepal (Unified Marxist-Leninist). She is also member of Rastriya Sabha and was elected from 2022 Nepalese National Assembly election.
