= Ram Kumar Gyawali =

Nepali politician

Personal details
- Party: CPN (Unified Socialist)

Ram Kumar Gyawali is a Nepalese politician, belonging to the CPN (Unified Socialist). He was elected MP in 1994, but lost his seat in 1999. He is the deputy in charge of Sudurpashchim Province of CPN(Unified Socialist).
