= Prakash Jwala =

Nepali politician (born 1966)

The Honourable Prakash Jwala MP MPA
- प्रकाश ज्वाला

Minister of Physical Infrastructure and Transport
- In office 16 April 2023 – 4 March 2024
- President: Ram Chandra Paudel
- Prime Minister: Pushpa Kamal Dahal
- Vice President: Ram Sahaya Yadav
- Preceded by: Narayan Kaji Shrestha
- Succeeded by: Raghubir Mahaseth

Member of the House of Representatives
- Incumbent
- Assumed office 2023
- Preceded by: Tek Bahadur Basnet
- In office May 1999 – 16 January 2008 (Note: Parliament was dissolved from May 2002 until April 2006.)
- Preceded by: Rajendra Bahadur Shah
- Succeeded by: Tek Bahadur Basnet
- Constituency: Salyan 1

Secretary of the CPN (Unified Socialist)
- Incumbent
- Assumed office 2021
- President: Madhav Kumar Nepal

Member of the Karnali Provincial Assembly
- In office February 2018 – 23 April 2021
- Preceded by: Office established
- Succeeded by: To be determined
- Constituency: Salyan 1(B)
Ministerial offices
Minister of Finance, Karnali
In office 18 February 2018 – 5 April 2021
Chief Minister	Mahendra Bahadur Shahi
Preceded by	Office established
Succeeded by	Gopal Sharma

Member of the 2nd Nepalese Constituent Assembly
- In office 2013–2017
- Preceded by: Uma Kant Sharma
- Succeeded by: Office disestablished
- Constituency: Salyan 2

Personal details
- Born: 27 November 1966 (age 59) Bangad, Nepal
- Party: CPN (Unified Socialist) (since 2021); CPN (UML) (until 2021)
- Children: 2

Prakash Jwala (Nepali: प्रकाश ज्वाला; born 27 November 1966) is a Nepali politician currently serving as minister of physical infrastructure and transport of Government of Nepal. He also served in the House of Representatives from 1999 until 2008 and in the Karnali Provincial Assembly from 2018 until his expulsion in April 2021, representing the Salyan 1 constituency as a member of the Communist Party of Nepal (Unified Marxist–Leninist). After his expulsion, Jwala joined the newly-formed Communist Party of Nepal (Unified Socialist), and is running as one of its candidates for the House of Representatives in the 2022 Nepalese general election.

== Biography ==
Prakash Jwala was born on 27 November 1966 in Bangad, Nepal. He holds a master's degree, and worked as a teacher prior to entering politics.

In the 1994 Nepalese general election, Jwala ran for the House of Representatives as a member of the Communist Party of Nepal (Unified Marxist–Leninist), standing in the Salyan 1 constituency. Jwala was defeated by Nepali Congress candidate Rajendra Bahadur Shah, receiving 7,930 votes to Shah's 11,714. Jwala ran for the same seat in the 1999 election, defeating Shah in a rematch; Jwala received 8,208 votes, while Shah received 7,089 votes. During his tenure in parliament, Jwala held several leadership positions. During the interim legislature of 2006 and 2007, Jwala served as chairman of the Natural Resources Committee and was the led a parliamentary committee tasked with investigating the financial holdings of King Gyanendra. He later served as chief advisor to Prime Minister Jhala Nath Khanal during the early-2010s and was a member of the CPN (UML) politburo.

In the 2008 election, Jwala ran as a candidate for the 1st Nepalese Constituent Assembly, standing in the Salyan 1 constituency. However, he was defeated by Communist Party of Nepal (Maoist Centre) candidate Tek Bahadur Basnet, receiving 9,487 votes to Basnet's 27,421. Jwala was elected to the 2nd Nepalese Constituent Assembly for the Salyan 2 constituency following the 2013 election. Jwala received 14,829 votes, while his two opponents, Dhrub Raj Puri of the Nepali Congress and Bhim Prakash Sharma of the Maoists, received 10,138 and 9,607 votes, respectively.

After receiving assurances from party leaders, Jwala successfully ran for the newly-formed Karnali Provincial Assembly in the 2017 Nepalese general election. He was elected in the Salyan 1(B) constituency. Following the election and the formation of a coalition government between the CPN (UML) and the Maoists, Jwala was appointed the Minister of Finance of Karnali Province; in this role, he was responsible for overseeing the provincial budget. In 2018, Jwala announced he would run to be the assembly leader of the CPN (UML), but later withdrew his candidacy in favor of Yam Lal Kandel. Jwala's proposed budget for 2020, which would increase spending by allocating funds towards large infrastructure projects and famine and disease prevention, was heavily criticized by other members of the government, who accused Jwala of fiscal malpractice by "distributing government funds as the current fiscal year approached its end" and urged him to resign. Jwala served as minister until 5 April 2021, resigning after the collapse of the coalition government.

On 16 April 2021, the CPN (UML) initiated a vote of no confidence against the Maoist-led government of Mahendra Bahadur Shahi, the chief minister of Karnali Province. Despite the vote being whipped, Jwala and three other CPN (UML) members crossed the floor and supported the Shahi government. The following week, all four were expelled from both the party and the assembly. Later in 2021, Jwala joined the newly-formed Communist Party of Nepal (Unified Socialist), becoming the party's deputy secretary general and the leader of the party in Karnali Province.

In the 2022 Nepalese general election, Jwala ran for the House of Representatives, standing in the Salyan 1 constituency as a member of the CPN (Unified Socialist). He defeated Rajendra Bir Rai of the CPN (UML). Jwala received 35,700 votes, while Rai received 19,789 votes. In his role as his party's deputy secretary general, Jwala co-wrote the party's manifesto for the 2022 election; in it, Jwala announced plans to expand Nepal's highway infrastructure, create a net-surplus of food, and incentivize rural development.

== Balkumari Incident ==
On 29 December 2023, two protestor died during the demonstration by Korean language test candidates. A high level probe commission, formed by the government under the former judge Shekhar Prasad Poudel, has convicted the minister Jwala for the incident.

== See also ==
- CPN (Unified Socialist)
