= Bidur Prasad Sapkota =

Nepali politician (1965 – 2025)

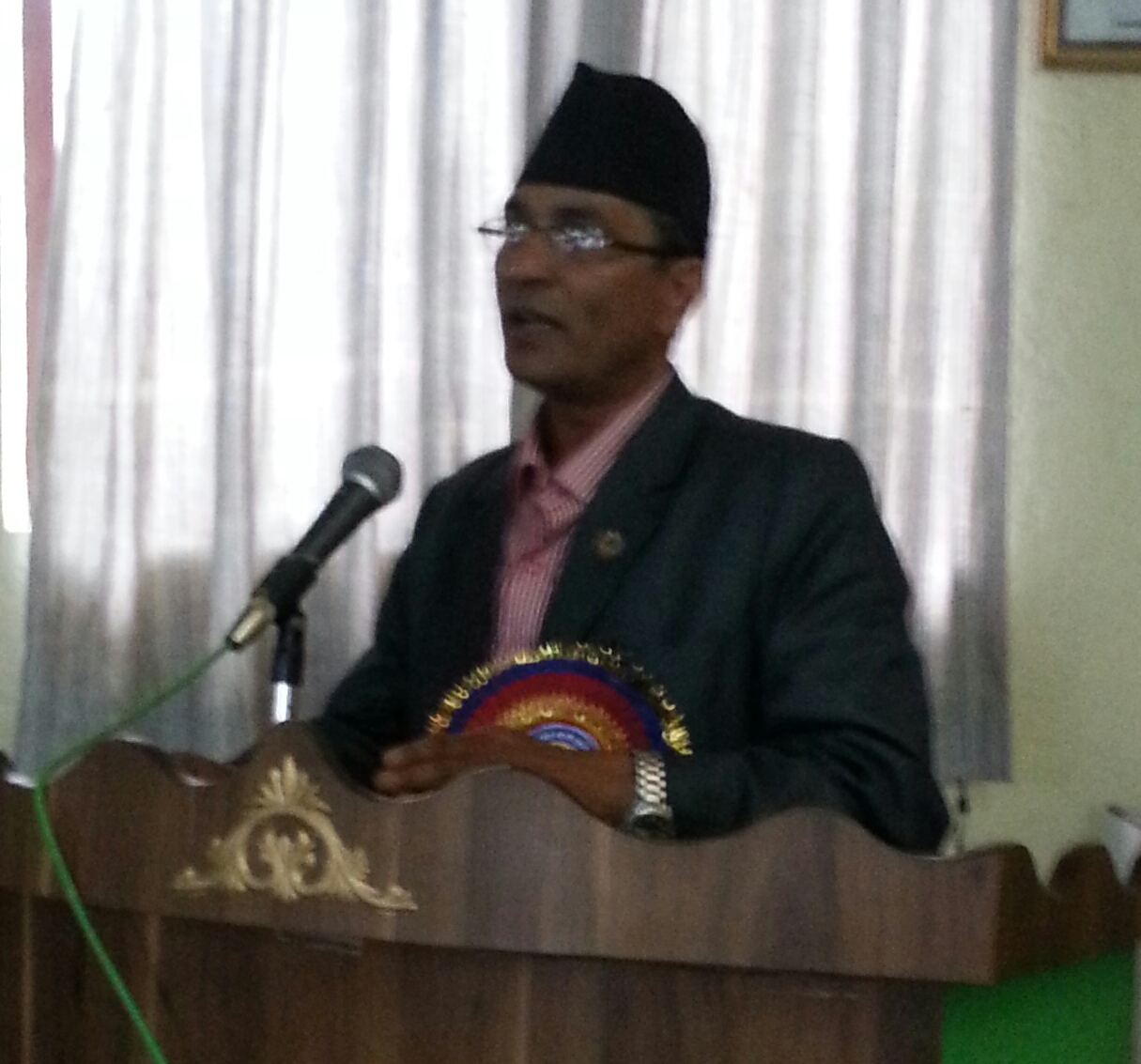
- Sapkota in 2014

Member of the Constituent Assembly
- In office 21 January 2014 – 14 October 2017
- President: Ram Baran Yadav
- Prime Minister: Sushil Koirala
- Preceded by: Tej Bahadur Mijar
- Succeeded by: Constituency abolished in 2017
- Constituency: Kavrepalanchok 4

Personal details
- Born: 7 September 1965 Mahadevsthan, Kavre, Nepal
- Died: 20 February 2025 (aged 59) Kathmandu, Nepal
- Citizenship: Nepali
- Party: CPN (Unified Socialist) (2021-2025)
- Other political affiliations: CPN (UML) (until 2018; 2021); Nepal Communist Party (2018-2021)
- Spouse: Bharati Bhetwal (m. 1995)
- Children: one daughter
- Education: Tri Chandra College, TU (MA in Sociology)

Bidur Prasad Sapkota (Nepali: विदुर प्रसाद सापकोटा; 7 September 1965 – 20 February 2025) was a Nepalese politician who served as a member of the 2nd Constituent Assembly of Nepal, representing Kavre-4 after winning the 2013 Constituent Assembly election as a candidate of the Communist Party of Nepal (Unified Marxist–Leninist) (CPN–UML). Following the 2021 split in the party, he joined the Communist Party of Nepal (Unified Socialist), where he became a politburo member and co-in-charge of Bagmati Province.

Sapkota was active in left-wing politics for several decades and served as the CPN–UML's Kavrepalanchok district secretary for 14 years. He participated in the 1990 People's Movement against the Panchayat system and contested multiple elections before his victory in 2013.

== Death ==
He died in Kathmandu on 20 February 2025 at the age of 59 while undergoing medical treatment at Helping Hands Hospital.
