= Chandra Bahadur Shahi =

Nepalese politician

Honourable Chandra Bahadur Shahi
- चन्द्रबहादुर शाही

Minister for Land Management, Agriculture and Cooperatives of Karnali Province
- Incumbent
- Assumed office 16 November 2021
- Governor: Tilak Pariyar
- Chief Minister: Jeevan Bahadur Shahi
- Preceded by: Kurma Raj Shahi

Province Assembly Member of Karnali Province
- Incumbent
- Assumed office 2017
- Preceded by: N/A
- Constituency: Mugu 1 (constituency)

Personal details
- Party: CPN (Unified Socialist)
- Occupation: Politician

Chandra Bahadur Shahi (Nepali: चन्द्रबहादुर शाही) is a Nepalese politician and Minister for Land Reform, Agriculture and Cooperatives of Karnali Province. He is also a member of Provincial Assembly of Karnali Province belonging to the CPN (Unified Socialist). Shahi, a resident of Soru Rural Municipality, was elected via 2017 Nepalese provincial elections from Mugu 1(B).

== Electoral history ==
=== 2017 Nepalese provincial elections ===
Party	Candidate	Votes
CPN (Unified Marxist–Leninist)	Chandra Bahadur Shahi	3,995
Nepali Congress	Khadga Shahi	4,612
Janasamajbadi Party	Dhan Tamata	253
Naya Shakti Party, Nepal	Surabir Shahi	4
Result	CPN (UML) gain	
Source: Election Commission
