= Hunga, Nepal =

Hunga, Nepal हुँगा
- Village Development Committee
- Location in Nepal
- Coordinates: 28.03°N 83.38°E
- Country: Nepal
- Province: Lumbini Province
- District: Gulmi District

Population (1991)
  - Total: 3,700
- Time zone: UTC+5:45 (Nepal Time)

Hunga is a town and municipality in Gulmi District in the Lumbini Province of central Nepal. At the time of the 1991 Nepal census it had a population of 3700 persons living in 711 individual households.
