= All Nepal National Free Students Union (Unified Socialist) =

Political student organization in Nepal

All Nepal National Free Student's Union (ANNFSU) अखिल नेपाल राष्ट्रिय स्वतन्त्र विद्यार्थी यूनियन (अनेरास्ववियू)
- ANNFSU flag
- Abbreviation: ANNFSU
- Established: 2021
- Type: Student wing
- Headquarters: Kathmandu, Nepal
- Region served: Nepal
- Members: 15,000
- President: Samir Bomrel
- General secretary: Mahesh Shrestha
- Parent organisation: CPN (Unified Socialist)

The All Nepal National Free Students' Union (ANNFSU) (Nepali: अखिल नेपाल राष्ट्रिय स्वतन्त्र विद्यार्थी यूनियन, abbreviated as अनेरास्ववियू) is a political student organization in Nepal. The ANNFSU was founded in 2021. The ANNFSU is politically tied to the CPN (Unified Socialist).

It declares itself a legitimate and independent students' organization of all progressive, democratic and patriotic students of Nepal.

== Leadership ==
=== Past presidents and General secretaries ===
- Sudesh Parajuli
  - Aarati Lama
