= Mohan Baniya =

Nepali politician

- मोहन बानिया

Minister of Office of the Prime Minister and Council of Ministers
- In office 10 June 2021 – 22 June 2021
- President: Bidya Devi Bhandari
- Prime Minister: KP Oli

Member of Parliament, Pratinidhi Sabha for CPN (UML) party list
- In office 4 March 2018 – 18 September 2022

Personal details
- Born: 29 January 1964 (age 62) Mugu District
- Party: CPN UML

Mohan Baniya is a Nepali communist politician who served as Minister of Office of the Prime Minister and Council of Ministers and member of the House of Representatives of the federal parliament of Nepal. He was elected under the proportional representation system from CPN UML.
