= Ruru, Nepal =

Ruru, Nepal रुरु
- Village Development Committee
- Location in Nepal
- Coordinates: 27.95°N 83.42°E
- Country: Nepal
- Zone: Lumbini Zone
- District: Gulmi District

Population (1991)
  - Total: 3,628
- Time zone: UTC+5:45 (Nepal Time)

Ruru is a town and municipality in Gulmi District in the Lumbini Zone of central Nepal. At the time of the 1991 Nepal census it had a population of 3628.

== Climate ==
Climate data for Ruru (Ridi Bazar), elevation 442 m (1,450 ft)
Month	Jan	Feb	Mar	Apr	May	Jun	Jul	Aug	Sep	Oct	Nov	Dec	Year
Mean daily maximum °C (°F)	20.8 (69.4)	23.6 (74.5)	28.9 (84.0)	34.0 (93.2)	34.7 (94.5)	33.7 (92.7)	31.2 (88.2)	31.0 (87.8)	30.7 (87.3)	29.4 (84.9)	25.9 (78.6)	21.9 (71.4)	28.8 (83.9)
Mean daily minimum °C (°F)	8.3 (46.9)	9.6 (49.3)	13.9 (57.0)	19.0 (66.2)	21.8 (71.2)	23.5 (74.3)	23.7 (74.7)	23.4 (74.1)	22.2 (72.0)	19.3 (66.7)	12.8 (55.0)	8.6 (47.5)	17.2 (62.9)
Average precipitation mm (inches)	24.2 (0.95)	21.7 (0.85)	23.3 (0.92)	38.9 (1.53)	93.6 (3.69)	239.2 (9.42)	391.2 (15.40)	305.3 (12.02)	183.6 (7.23)	45.9 (1.81)	6.8 (0.27)	14.5 (0.57)	1,388.2 (54.66)
Source 1: Australian National University
Source 2: Japan International Cooperation Agency (precipitation)
