= Jayanti Devi Rai =

Nepali politician

Jayanti Rai
- जयन्ती राई

Deputy Chairman of CPN (Unified Socialist)
- Incumbent
- Assumed office 23 September 2021
- Preceded by: Position created

Member of Rastriya Sabha
- Incumbent
- Assumed office 2022
- Prime Minister: Sher Bahadur Deuba
- Constituency: Province No. 1

Personal details
- Party: CPN (Unified Socialist)

Jayanti Rai (Nepali: जयन्ती राई) is a current Deputy chairman of the CPN (Unified Socialist). She is also a member of the Rastriya Sabha and was elected in the 2022 Nepalese National Assembly election.
