= Nav Raj Dhami =

Nepali politician

Nav Raj Dhami (Nepali: नवराज धामी) is a Nepalese politician, belonging to the Communist Party of Nepal (Maoist). In the 2008 Constituent Assembly election, he was elected from the Mugu-1 constituency, winning 10,100 votes.
