= Pradeep Kumar Gyawali =

Nepali politician

- प्रदीप कुमार ज्ञवाली
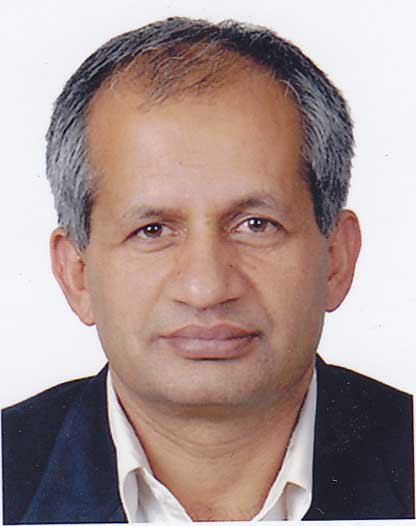

Minister of Foreign Affairs
- In office 14 March 2018 – 4 June 2021
- President: Bidya Devi Bhandari
- Prime Minister: Khadga Prasad Sharma Oli
- Preceded by: Krishna Bahadur Mahara
- Succeeded by: Raghubir Mahaseth

Minister for Culture, Tourism and Civil Aviation
- In office May 2006 – April 2007
- Monarch: King Gyanendra
- Prime Minister: Girija Prasad Koirala

Member of the Parliament, Pratinidhi Sabha
- In office 4 March 2018 – 18 September 2022
- Preceded by: Krishna Bahadur Chhantyal Thapa
- Constituency: Gulmi 1
- In office May 1999 – May 2002
- Preceded by: Kamal Raj Shrestha
- Constituency: Gulmi 2

Member of Constituent Assembly
- In office 28 May 2008 – 28 May 2012
- Succeeded by: Chandra Kant Bhandari
- Constituency: Gulmi 2

Personal details
- Born: 13 September 1962 (age 63) Gulmi, Nepal
- Party: CPN (UML) (before 2018; 2021-present)
- Other political affiliations: Nepal Communist Party (NCP) (2018-2021)
- Spouse: Saraswati Aryal Gyawali
- Children: 3

Pradeep Kumar Gyawali (Nepali: प्रदीप कुमार ज्ञवाली) is a Nepalese politician. He served as the Minister of Foreign Affairs from 14 March 2018 to 4 June 2021 under prime minister KP Sharma Oli. He is a central committee member of the Communist Party of Nepal (Unified Marxist–Leninist). He currently serves as the Member of Parliament from Gulmi–1, having been elected in the 2017 general election with a majority of over 7,000 votes. He previously served as the member of parliament from Gulmi–2 from 1999 to 2013. Gyawali also served as the Minister for Culture, Tourism and Civil Aviation from May 2006 to April 2007 under prime minister Girija Prasad Koirala.

== Personal life ==
He was born on 13 September 1962 in Gulmi district of western Nepal. He is married to Saraswarti Aryal Gyawali, and they have three children.

== Political life ==
His political career started in 1970s through his affiliation with Nepali Left Movement and subsequent involvement in student politics in 1973. Associated with Communist Coordination Committee in 1977, he got the Communist Party membership in 1978. During his involvement in the underground party work in 1979-90, he worked as Gulmi District Committee member of the Party from 1979 to 1989. He served the Party as District Secretary during 1989-93 at Arghakhanchi district before assuming the responsibility of the Zonal Secretary from 1994 to 1995. He had been in the Central Committee of the Communist Party of Nepal (United Marxist Leninist) since 1997 when he was elected as a member of the Committee.

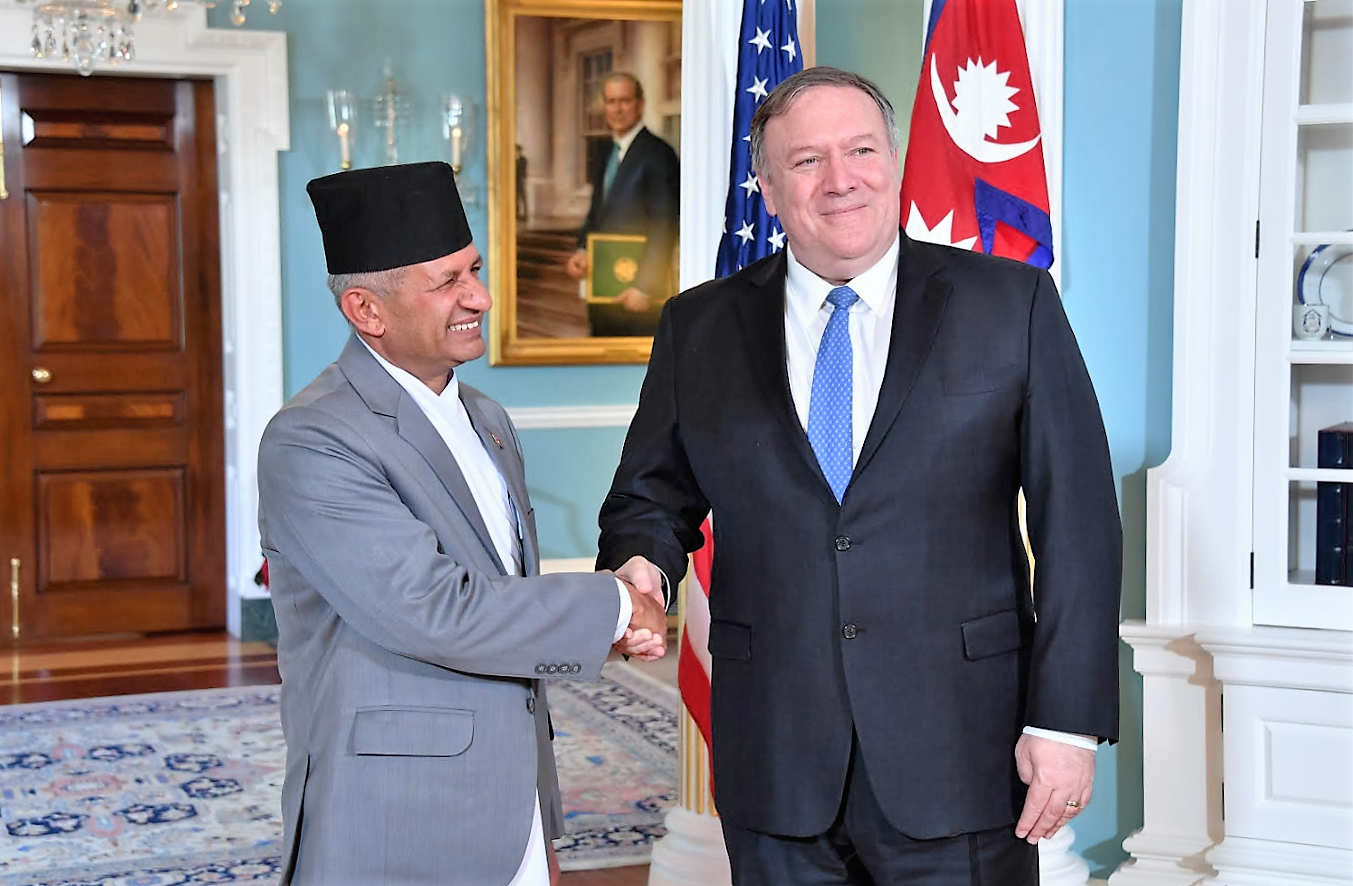
Gyawali meets with U.S. Secretary of State Michael R. Pompeo at the U.S. Department of State in Washington, D.C., on December 18, 2018.

Now, he is the member of the Standing Committee of the Nepal Communist Party (NCP). Prior to this, he was elected as a member of the Constituent Assembly in 2008 as well as a member of House of Representatives in 1999. He was a member of State Affairs Committee of the Parliament from 1999 to 2012 and a member of Parliamentary Proceedings Advisory Committee during his tenure as the member of Constituent Assembly from 2008 to 2012. As an MP, he led different parliamentary investigations on corruption cases.

Gyawali also served as Minister for Culture, Tourism and Civil Aviation from May 2006 to April 2007. He was one of the key members of the government team that negotiated with the then Maoist rebels. His role is highly appreciated in Nepali peace process.

== Literature ==
Gyawali has a number of literary works ranging from poetry, fiction, essays as well as critiques on political and philosophical commentaries to his credit. They include a novel Sahayatri (1990), a collection of short stories Kuhiro (2003) and poetic works such as Chita Jalirahechha (1994), Aastha o Mery Priya (2002) and Bina Salik Ka Nayakharu (2016). Similarly, essays and critiques include Marxvadko Srijanatmak Prayog (Creative Use of Marxism) (2000), Prachandpath (2002), Phoenix Panchi (2003), Yuba (2005), Rastriyata, Pahichan ra Samajik Rupantaran (Nationality, Identity and Social Transformation) (2013), and Samskritik Rupantaran: Ek Vimarsha (Cultural Transformation: An Analysis) (2015). He worked as editor-in-chief of magazines such as Nawayug (monthly) and Ekkasaun Satabdi (weekly). He also contributes articles to the national dailies as a columnist.

== Electoral history ==
1999 Pratinidhi Sabha election

Gulmi–2

Party	Candidate	Votes
CPN (Unified Marxist–Leninist)	Pradeep Kumar Gyawali	24,345
Nepali Congress	Chandra Bahadur K.C.	23,669
CPN (Marxist–Leninist)	Tej Prasad Kandel	1,640
Others		1,184
Invalid votes		1,201
Result	CPN (UML) hold	
Source: Election Commission

2008 Constituent Assembly election

Gulmi–2

Party	Candidate	Votes
CPN (Unified Marxist–Leninist)	Pradeep Kumar Gyawali	23,253
Nepali Congress	Chandra Kant Bhandari	21,101
CPN (Maoist)	Nim Bahadur Pandey	7,321
Others		2,211
Invalid votes		2,168
Result	CPN (UML) hold	
Source: Election Commission

2013 Constituent Assembly election

Gulmi–2

Party	Candidate	Votes
Nepali Congress	Chandra Kant Bhandari	21,189
CPN (Unified Marxist–Leninist)	Pradeep Kumar Gyawali	18,681
UCPN (Maoist)	Ashok Thapa	4,531
Others		1,155
Result	Congress gain	
Source: NepalNews

2017 House of Representatives election

Gulmi–1

Party	Candidate	Votes
CPN (Unified Marxist–Leninist)	Pradeep Kumar Gyawali	37,814
Nepali Congress	Chandra Kant Bhandari	30,256
Others		779
Invalid votes		1,717
Result	CPN (UML) gain	
Source: Election Commission
