= Gokarna Bista =

Nepali politician

Gokarna Raj Bista
- गोकर्ण राज विष्ट
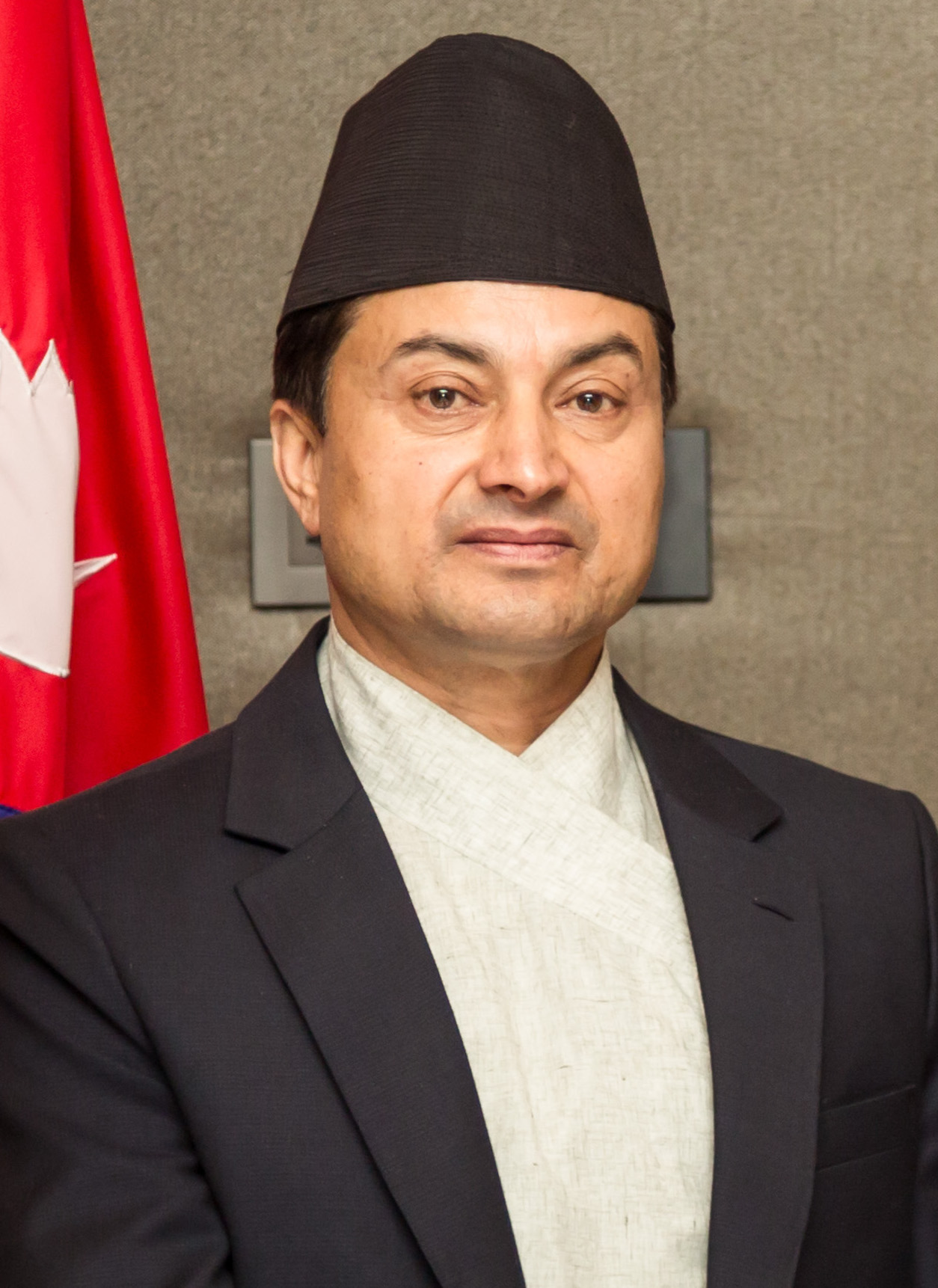

Minister of Labour, Employment and Social Security
- In office 16 March 2018 – 20 November 2018
- President: Bidhya Devi Bhandari
- Prime Minister: Khadga Prasad Oli
- Preceded by: Farmulha Mansur
- Succeeded by: Rameshwor Raya Yadav

Minister of Energy
- In office 21 April 2011 – 30 August 2011
- President: Ram Baran Yadav
- Prime Minister: Jhala Nath Khanal

Secretary of Communist Party of Nepal (Unified Marxist–Leninist)
- Incumbent
- Assumed office July 2014

Member of Parliament, Pratinidhi Sabha
- In office 4 March 2018 – 12 September 2025
- Preceded by: Chandra Kant Bhandari (as MCA)
- Succeeded by: Govinda Panthi
- Constituency: Gulmi 2
- In office May 1999 – May 2002
- Preceded by: Tanka Prasad Pokharel
- Succeeded by: Chandra Bahadur Thapa (as MCA)
- Constituency: Gulmi 3

Member of Constituent Assembly
- In office 21 January 2014 – 14 October 2017
- Preceded by: Chandra Bahadur Thapa
- Succeeded by: Constituency abolished
- Constituency: Gulmi 3

Personal details
- Born: 1 July 1965 (age 61) Dohali-3, Gulmi district
- Party: CPN (UML)
- Parents: Bhim Bahadur Bista (father); Chinta Kala Bista (mother)
- Education: Tribhuvan University
- Awards: Hydro Excellence Award 2068; Nagarik Abhinandan 2068

Gokarna Bista (Nepali: गोकर्ण विष्ट) is a Nepalese politician and former secretary of Communist Party of Nepal (UML). He served as Minister of Energy under prime minister Jhala Nath Khanal and as Minister of Labour, Employment and Social Security in the KP Oli-led cabinet. He was elected in the 2013 Nepalese Constituent Assembly election from Gulmi district constituency number 3. In April 2011, during his tenure as the minister of energy, he was stabbed by two motorcyclists outside his house. He became popular for revolutionary changes in the power sector of Nepal.

== Early life and career ==
A central member of, Gokarna Raj Bista was born on July 1, 1965, in Dohali-3, Gulmi District. Son of Bhim Bahadur and Chinta Kala Bista, he commenced his political career in 1978.

Succeeded to take out his name in Public Service Commission in 1983, he quit the government job immediately as disputes erupted with Kaji Man Kandnawa, Anchaladish(zone chief), on the very first day of his job. Then onwards, he joined politics and took membership of the party in 1986.

Bista served as a Bagmati zone chairman and a Kathmandu district chairman of ANNFSU, students’ wing of CPN-UML. He took assignment as a Chief to different departments such as Organization committee of Central Committee, Education Department, Creative Department, Publicity and Promotion Department.

After involving with students’ politics, he joined the working committee of then Democratic National Youth Association DNYA (Now Youth Association of Nepal) in 1993. He became the chairman of DNYA for two terms starting from 2000 after being General Secretary in 1996.

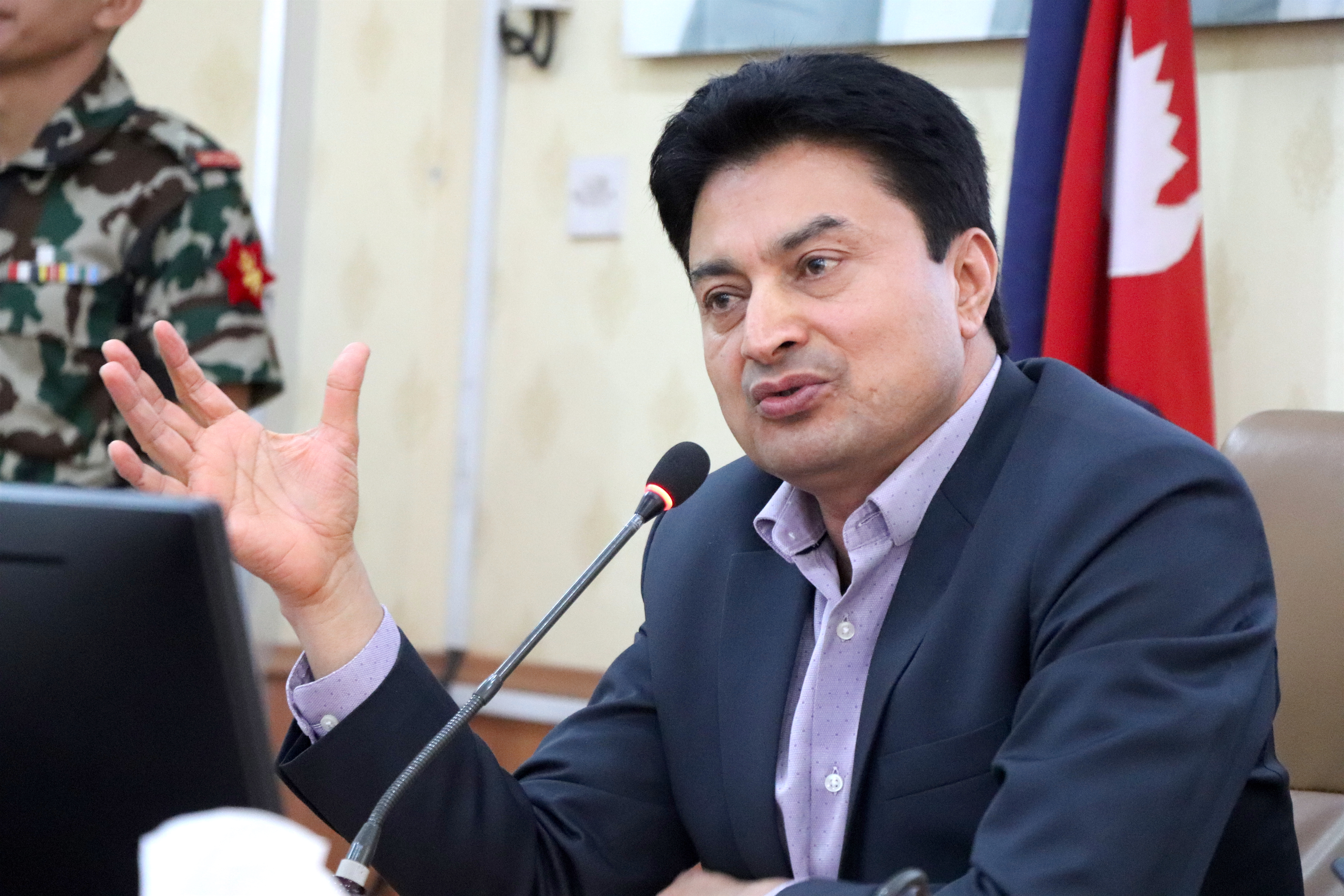
Bista speaking at a meeting in Kathmandu

Bista, who served as an in-charge to different departments like Local Department, Students’ Department and Youth Department, is currently serving as an in-charge to Intellectual Council of CPN-UML.

A parliamentarian of 1996 parliament, elected from Gulmi-3, Bista was appointed as a Minister for Energy during Jhala Nath Khanal led government. In 2008 CA election, he was defeated by then CPN-Maoist's candidate from same constituency, Gulmi-3.

A locally popular leader Bista became quite popular for his attempts to implement the revolutionary changes in country's power sector including power cuts. He holds master's degree in Management Faculty and bachelor's degree in law.

== Family ==
He was born on 1 July 1965 at Gulmi district to Bhim Bahadur Bista and Chinta Kala Bista.

== Electoral history ==
1999 House of Representatives Election Gulmi-3

Party	Candidate	Votes	Status
CPN-UML	Gokarna Bista	18,020	Elected
Nepali Congress	Trailokya Pratap Sen	15,764	Lost

2008 Constituent Assembly Election Gulmi-3

Party	Candidate	Votes	Status
Unified Communist Party of Nepal (Maoist)	Chandra Bahadur Thapa	16,581	Elected
CPN-UML	Gokarna Bista		Lost

2013 Constituent Assembly Election Gulmi-3

Party	Candidate	Votes	Status
CPN-UML	Gokarna Bista	15,012	Elected
Nepali Congress	Trailokya Pratap Sen	8,745	Lost

2017 House of Representatives Election Gulmi-2

Party	Candidate	Votes	Status
CPN-UML	Gokarna Bista	34,918	Elected
Nepali Congress	Chandra K.C.	20,156	Lost

2022 House of Representatives Election Gulmi-2

Party	Candidate	Votes	Status
CPN-UML	Gokarna Bista	28, 476	Elected
Communist Party of Nepal(Unified Socialist)	Ramkumari Jhakri	26,441	Lost
