= Amar Bahadur Thapa =

Nepali politician (born 1956)

Honourable Amar Bahadur Thapa
- अमर बहादुर थापा

Member of Parliament, Pratinidhi Sabha
- Incumbent
- Assumed office 2023
- Preceded by: Rabindra Raj Sharma
- Constituency: Dailekh 1

Member of Karnali Provincial Assembly
- In office 4 March 2018 – September 2022
- Preceded by: Constituency established
- Succeeded by: Krishna Kumar B.C.
- Constituency: Dailekh 1(B)

Member of the 2nd Nepalese Constituent Assembly
- In office 21 January 2014 – 14 October 2017
- Preceded by: Ganesh Bahadur Khadka
- Succeeded by: Rabindra Raj Sharma
- Constituency: Dailekh 1

Personal details
- Born: 25 January 1956 (age 70) Dailekh District, Nepal
- Party: CPN (Unified Socialist)

Amar Bahadur Thapa (Nepali: अम्मर बहादुर थापा) is a Nepali politician belonging to the CPN (Unified Socialist). He was a member of 2nd Nepalese Constituent Assembly. He won the Dailekh–1 seat in the 2013 Nepalese Constituent Assembly election from Communist Party of Nepal (Unified Marxist–Leninist).
