= Communist Party of Nepal (Unified Socialist) =

Political party in Nepal

Communist Party of Nepal (Unified Socialist) नेपाल कम्युनिष्ट पार्टी (एकीकृत समाजवादी)
- Abbreviation: CPN (US); CPN (Socialist)
- Chairman: Madhav Kumar Nepal
- Senior Vice chairman: Rajendra Prasad Pandey
- General secretary: Ghanashyam Bhusal
- Founder: Madhav Kumar Nepal, Jhala Nath Khanal, Pradeep Nepal and others
- Founded: 18 August 2021
- Registered: 25 August 2021
- Dissolved: 4 November 2025
- Split from: CPN (UML)
- Merged into: CPN (United); CPN (UML) (minority)
- Succeeded by: Nepali Communist Party (majority)
- Headquarters: Min Bhawan, Aaloknagar, Kathmandu
- Newspaper: Kalam News
- Student wing: All Nepal National Free Students Union (ANNFSU)
- Youth wing: Youth Federation Nepal
- Women's wing: All Nepal Women's Association (Socialist)
- Labour wing: Integrated Centre of Trade Unions, Nepal
- Peasant's wing: All Nepal Peasants Association
- Membership (2021): 146,715
- Ideology: Communism; Marxism–Leninism; People's Multiparty Democracy
- Political position: Left-wing
- International affiliation: International Peoples' Assembly
- Alliance: Samajbadi Morcha
- Colours

Election symbol

Party flag

Website
- www.cpnus.org.np

The Communist Party of Nepal (Unified Socialist) (Nepali: नेपाल कम्युनिष्ट पार्टी (एकीकृत-समाजवादी), romanized: Nēpāla kamyuniṣṭa pārṭī (Ēkīkr̥ta-Samājavādī)), abbreviated as CPN (Unified Socialist) was a major political party in Nepal led by former Prime Minister Madhav Kumar Nepal until it dissolved to form Nepali Communist Party along with eight other major and minor splinter communist groups. A group consisting general secretary Ghanashyam Bhusal, Jeevan Ram Shrestha, Bhawani Prasad Khapung, Urbadutta Pant, Laxman Lamsal, etc formed Unified Socialist Reorganization Campaign.

Former Prime Minister Madhav Kumar Nepal remained the chairman of the party and former Prime Minister Jhala Nath Khanal served as the senior leader. The party was officially registered at the Election Commission, Nepal on 18 August 2021 while it received its certificate of registration on 25 August when the Election Commission verified its application with signature of more than twenty percent in both central committee and federal parliamentary party.

== Ideology ==
The party's ideology consists of Marxism–Leninism and support for a multi-party system. The party also favors socialist-oriented economy.

== History ==
=== Formation ===
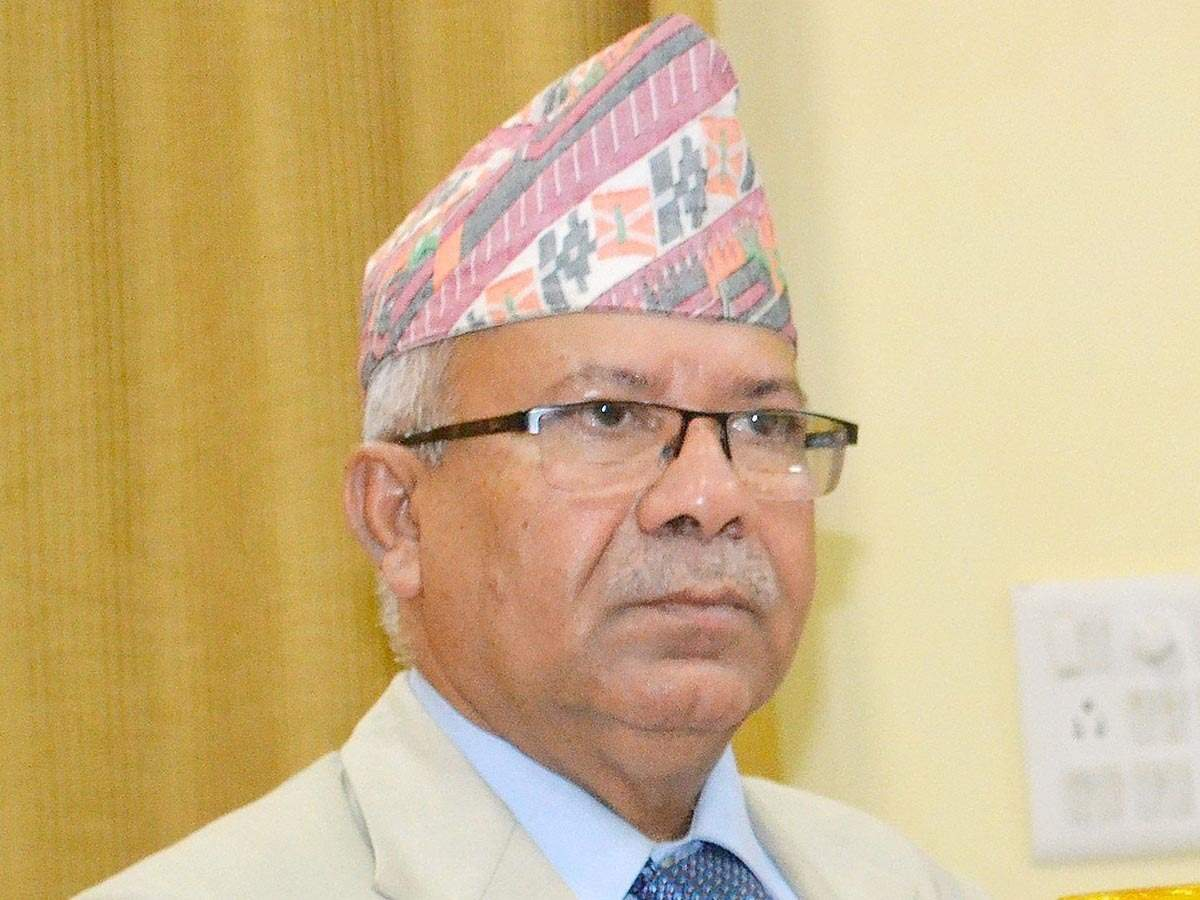
Former Prime Minister Madhav Kumar Nepal, founder of the CPN (Unified Socialist)

President Bidya Devi Bhandari, on the recommendation of the council of ministers issued second amendment on political parties related act on 18 August 2021 relaxing the requirements to split parties with 20 percent or more members of the Parliamentary Party and the Central Committee of the political party.

This same amendment opened the way to formalize the splits caused due to the dispute between two factions of Janata Samajbadi Party, Nepal and CPN(UML) respectively. The CPN(UML) faction led by Madhav Kumar Nepal and Jhala Nath Khanal which had a long dispute with CPN(UML) chairman KP Sharma Oli had applied to register their party by the name ''CPN (Unified Socialist)'' with the Election Commission. However, the Election Commission requested him not to register under a preregistered name by including some adjectives.

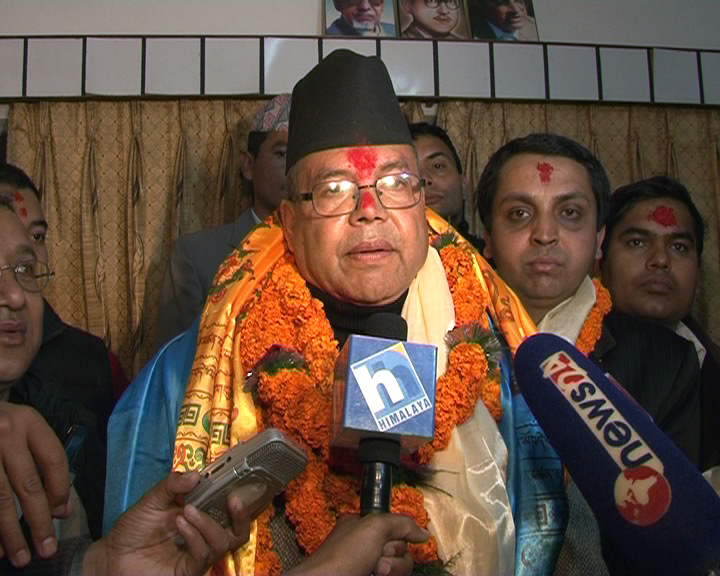
Former Prime Minister Jhalanath Khanal, senior leader of the CPN (Unified Socialist)

At the time of the launch of the party, leaders claimed to have 31 members in the two national houses of parliament including 23 from House of Representatives and eight from National Assembly. A Central Committee with 95 members was announced as well. However, many politicians of the mother party CPN(UML) had not finalised their decision yet including party less leader Bam Dev Gautam. Madhav Kumar Nepal was announced to act as the coordinator of the party.

The decision of Madhav Kumar Nepal to form a new party was however met with some criticism from within his own faction. The second generation leaders close to him boycotted the decision except party secretary Jeevan Ram Shrestha and Ram Kumari Jhakri. Leaders including Ghanashyam Bhusal and Yogesh Bhattarai sided with KP Sharma Oli for party unity. This faction included leaders like Yubaraj Gyawali, Astalaxmi Shakya, Bhim Bahadur Rawal, Ghanashyam Bhusal, Gokarna Bista, Bhim Acharya, Yogesh Bhattarai and standing committee members including Surendra Pandey, Raghuji Pant and Amrit Kumar Bohara. They even attended the standing committee meeting of the 8th Bhadra which called upon Nepal faction for party unity for a final time and instructed CPN (UML) to fulfill their 10 points demand. Howeven the 10 point demand was never followed. Later Bhim Bahadur Rawal and Ghanashyam Bhusal were ditched and side lined from the party after 10th general convention of former party for not following party supremo Oli.

On the same day (8th Bhadra), Madhav Kumar Nepal arranged a meeting where he presented the party's doctrine and announced that People's Multiparty Democracy would be their guiding philosophy.

=== Party Authentication ===
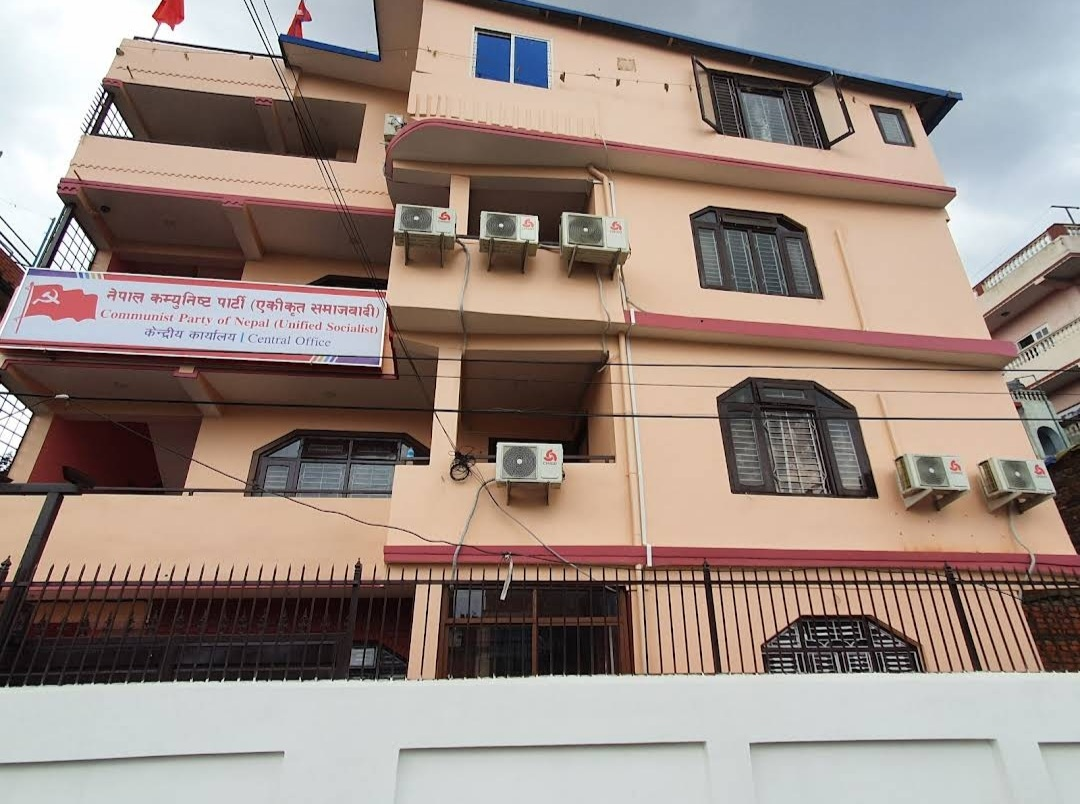
Party office of CPN (Unified Socialist)

Following the registration, the Election Commission had summoned CPN (Unified Socialist) on 9th Bhadra for authentication. As per the new provision the party had to present signatures 20% of either the central committee or the parliamentary party to authenticate the registration. The party was able to meet the threshold with 55 out of 205 members of the central committee and 9 out of 33 of the National Assembly and 24 out of 121 of House of Representatives.

Among these members, Pradeep Nepal, a central committee member who was earlier close to Oli, was present during signature session. The signature of Jhala Nath Khanal who signed it from Delhi was counted although the Election Commission had rejected his previous request to accept such signatures as he had been in Delhi for his kidney transplant. However, the Election Commission rejected to accept the signatures of Som Prasad Pandey, Jibaraj Ashrit, Tulsa Thapa and Sharada Devi Bhatta as they had not signed the earlier application for party registration. Letter a petition was filed at Supreme Court which allowed them to join the new party.

=== Organization development and first local election ===
The party election just eight months after the party formation. Even though the period of organization development was short, party caders got elected unopposed as chairperson of Kaike and Chharka Tangsong rural municipalities of Dolpa district which remained the highest won unopposed by any party. While the party went to election without alliance in Madhesh Province, the party won six local levels out of which four were from Rautahat, the home district of party chair Madhav Kumar Nepal. The party gave close contest to Nepali Congress. Here, the party won five municipalities and one rural municipality. The party won the mayoralty of Pokhara Metropolitan city and Hetauda Sub-metropolitan city and defeated the CPN (UML). Although the party obtained support of alliance in numerous places, it was able to win only twenty local levels signing that the party organization had still not developed as expected.

As a whole, the party won 20 heads, 24 deputy heads, 190 ward chairs and 753 ward members with a total of 986 seats throughout the country. The party went most successful in Madhesh Province where it bagged 6 heads, 5 deputy heads, 80 ward chairs and 310 ward members with a total of 401 seats and that too without any pre electoral alliance contributing to 40% of total national wins.

== Party merger and integration ==
A number of parties have merged with CPN (Unified Socialist) since its formation:

Year	Party	Leader
2021	CPN (Janavadi)	Devendra Singh Mahato
2021	CPN (Unified)	Alok Rayamajhi
2021	CPN (Gaurabshali)	Bhabishwar Parajuli
2021	Unified Socialist Front	Sewantraj Bhandari
2022	Independent Communist Group	Ghanashyam Bhusal
2025	Unity National Campaign	Bam Dev Gautam

== Organization and structure ==
=== Central organization ===
==== Secretariat ====
A twelve-member secretariat (also known as High Command) of the party was created. It included:

- Chairperson: Madhav Kumar Nepal
- General secretary: Ghanashyam Bhusal
- Members: Jhala Nath Khanal, Ram Chandra Jha, Rajendra Prasad Pandey, Beduram Bhusal, Pramesh Kumar Hamal, Jayanti Rai, Prakash Jwala, Gangalal Tuladhar, Bijay Paudel and Jagannath Khatiwada

==== Standing Committee ====
The 34 member Standing Committee of the Central Political Bureau has been formed.

==== Politburo ====
An 86-member politburo has been formed after the formation of the standing committee and central committee.

==== Central Committee ====
The central committee had a total of 355 members.

== Leadership ==
The party has one chairperson, seven deputy chairpersons, one General secretary, four Deputy general secretary and six Secretary. Altogether there are 18 party portfolio holders. Jhalanath Khanal is senior leader and Pradeep Nepal is the leader of the party and are kept at position two and three respectively.

=== Chairperson ===
- Madhav Kumar Nepal

=== Senior Vice Chairperson ===
- Rajendra Prasad Pandey

=== Vice-chairman ===
- Gangalal Tuladhar
- Bhanu Bhakta Joshi
- Prakash Jwala
- Jagannath Khatiwada
- Dharmanath Prasad Sah
- Jayanti Devi Rai

=== General Secretary ===
- Ghanashyam Bhusal

=== Deputy General Secretary ===
- Metmani Chaudhary
- Ram Kumar Bhattarai
- Garima Shah
- Rajendra Kumar Rai

=== Secretary ===
- Sher Bahadur Kunwor
- Som Prasad Pandey
- Shreenath Baral
- Sabitra Bhusal
- Chandra Bahadur Shahi
- Ganesh Bishwakarma
- Baldev Chaudhary

=== Provincial committees ===
Province	Incharge	Deputy Incharge	Chairman	Deputy Chairman	Secretary	Deputy secretary
Province No. 1	Dhanendra Basnet	Rajendra Kumar Rai	Sarita Thapa	Dharma Raj Niraula; Rajan Rai	Mahesh Regmi	Mira Dahal Hira
Madhesh	Dharma Nath Prasad Sah	Ratneshwar Goit; Ram Pirit Paswan	Ram Chandra Yadav	Laxman Paudel; Ram Chandra Sah Teli	Sudhir Sah	Narayan Acharya
Bagmati	Kedar Neupane	Jeevan Ram Shrestha; Sadhya Bahadur Bhandari; Krishna Prasad Khanal	Sabitra Bhusal	Bidur Sapkota; Tok Bahadur Waiba	Laxman Lamsal	
Gandaki	Keshav Lal Shrestha	Tul Bahadur Gurung; Sharda Subedi	Ramji Sharma	Shree Nath Baral; Prem Narayan Paudel	Pratap Lal Shrestha	Rekha Thapa Bashyal
Lumbini	Bhagwat Biswasi	Nirmala Subedi	Som Prasad Pandey	Pitambar Bhusal	Raju Gurung	Brihaspati Adhikari; Sarada Swarnakar; Hari Prasad Gharti
Karnali	Prakash Jwala	Chandra Bahadur Shahi; Sher Bahadur KC; Hansa Bahadur Shahi	Amar Bahadur Thapa	Devi Lal Thapa; Nanda Sharma Chapai	Thagendra Prasad Puri	Gopal Bahadur Bam; Krishna BC
Sudurpaschim	Garima Shah	Devendra Singh Mahat; Prem Ale; Nira Devi Jairu; Ram Kumar Gyawali; Parmananda Bhatta	Harka Bahadur Singh	Sher Bahadur Kunwor	Dinesh Chandra Subedi	Dirgha Bahadur Sodari; Maya Bhatta
Kathmandu Valley (Special)	Bishwa Nath Pyakurel	Pramod Sharma	Kedar Sanjel		Bishnu Lamsal	

== Chief ministers ==
=== Koshi Province ===
No.	Chief Minister	Portrait	Terms in Office			Legislature	Cabinet	Constituency
No.	Chief Minister	Portrait	Start	End	Tenure	Legislature	Cabinet	Constituency
1	Rajendra Kumar Rai		2 November 2021	9 January 2023	1 year, 68 days	1st Assembly	R. K. Rai, 2021	Bhojpur 1(B)

=== Bagmati Province ===
No.	Chief Minister	Portrait	Terms in Office			Legislature	Cabinet	Constituency
No.	Chief Minister	Portrait	Start	End	Tenure	Legislature	Cabinet	Constituency
1	Rajendra Prasad Pandey		27 October 2021	23 December 2022	1 year, 51 days	1st Assembly	Pandey, 2021	Dhading 1(A)

=== Sudurpashchim Province ===
No.	Chief Minister	Portrait	Terms in Office			Legislature	Cabinet	Constituency
No.	Chief Minister	Portrait	Start	End	Tenure	Legislature	Cabinet	Constituency
1	Dirgha Bahadur Sodari		18 April 2024	5 August 2024	109 days	2nd Assembly	Sodari, 2024	Kailali 4(B)

== Electoral performance ==
=== General election ===
Election	Leader	Party list votes		Seats	Position	Resulting government
Election	Leader	No.	%	Seats	Position	Resulting government
2022	Madhav Kumar Nepal	298,391	2.83 (Note: Represented as Independent for not reaching the 3% threshold)	10 / 275	7th	Coalition Government

=== Provincial election ===
Province	Election	Party list votes		Seats	Position	Resulting government
Province	Election	Votes	Percentage	Seats	Position	Resulting government
Province No. 1	2022	55,957	2.95	4 / 93	5th	In opposition
Madhesh	2022	113,915	5.46	7 / 107	7th	Confidence & supply
Bagmati	2022	68,101	3.52	7 / 110	4th	In opposition
Gandaki	2022	15,076	1.53	1 / 60	6th	In opposition
Lumbini	2022	42,621	2.26	1 / 87	9th	In opposition
Karnali	2022	35,826	6.20	1 / 40	4th	In opposition
Sudurpaschim	2022	43,819	4.89	5 / 53	5th	In opposition

== List of Members of Parliament ==
=== List of Rastriya Sabha members from CPN (Unified Socialist) ===
No.	Name	Province	Appointment date	Retirement date
1.	Jayanti Rai	Province No. 1	2022	2028
2.	Beduram Bhusal	Bagmati	2020	2026
3.	Goma Devi Timalsina	Bagmati	2022	2028
4.	Singha Bahadur Bishwakarma	Bagmati	2018	2024
5.	Rajya Laxmi Gaire	Lumbini	2022	2028
6.	Udaya Bohara	Karnali	2022	2028
7.	Nanda Sharma	Karnali	2018	2024
8.	Madan Kumari Shah	Sudurpashchim	2022	2028

=== List of Pratinidhi Sabha members from CPN (Unified Socialist) ===
No.	Name	Constituency	Portrait	Province	Elected from
1.	Amar Bahadur Thapa	Dailekh 1		Karnali	2022 Nepalese general election
2.	Bhanu Bhakta Joshi	Bajhang 1		Sudurpashchim	2022 Nepalese general election
3.	Dhan Bahadur Buda	Dolpa 1		Karnali	2022 Nepalese general election
4.	Krishna Kumar Shrestha	Bara 4		Madhesh	2022 Nepalese general election
5.	Madhav Kumar Nepal	Rautahat 1		Madhesh	2022 Nepalese general election
6.	Metmani Chaudhary	Dang 1		Lumbini	2022 Nepalese general election
7.	Prakash Jwala	Salyan 1		Karnali	2022 Nepalese general election
8.	Prem Bahadur Ale	Doti 1		Sudurpashchim	2022 Nepalese general election
9.	Rajendra Prasad Pandey	Dhading 1		Bagmati	2022 Nepalese general election
10.	Sher Bahadur Kunwor	Achham 1		Sudurpashchim	2022 Nepalese general election

== Sister organizations ==
Following are the sister organizations of the party:

- Integrated Centre of Trade Unions, Nepal
  (एकीकृत ट्रेड युनियन महासंघ, नेपाल)
- Youth Federation Nepal
  (युवा संघ नेपाल)
- All Nepal National Free Students Union
  (अखिल नेपाल राष्ट्रिय स्वतन्त्र विद्यार्थी युनियन)
- All Nepal Women's Association (Socialist)
  (अखिल नेपाल महिला सङ्घ (समाजवादी))
- All Nepal Peasants Association
  (अखिल नेपाल किसान महासंघ)
- Progressive Nepal National Teachers Association
  (प्रगतिशील नेपाल राष्ट्रिय शिक्षक संघ)

== See also ==
- Nepali Communist Party
- Unified Socialist Reorganization Campaign
- 10th general convention of Communist Party of Nepal (Unified Socialist)
- 2021 split in Communist Party of Nepal (Unified Marxist-Leninist)
