= Member of Parliament (Nepal) =

Member of Nepalese Parliament

A member of Parliament (MP) in Nepal refers to persons who serve in the Federal Parliament of Nepal. These include:

- Member of Parliament, Rastriya Sabha: representative of the Nepalese provinces to the Rastriya Sabha, the upper house of the Federal Parliament of Nepal.
- Member of Parliament, Pratinidhi Sabha: representative of the Nepalese citizens to the Pratinidhi Sabha, the lower house of the Federal Parliament of Nepal.

== Pratinidhi Sabha ==
- 1st Pratinidhi Sabha (1959)
- 2nd Pratinidhi Sabha (1991)
- 3rd Pratinidhi Sabha (1994)
- 4th Pratinidhi Sabha (1999)
- 5th Pratinidhi Sabha (2017)
- 6th Pratinidhi Sabha (2022)
- 7th Pratinidhi Sabha (2026)

== Rastriya Sabha ==
- List of current members of Rastriya Sabha
- List of nominated members of Rastriya Sabha
- List of National Assembly members from Koshi Province
- List of National Assembly members from Madhesh Province
- List of National Assembly members from Bagmati Province
- List of National Assembly members from Gandaki Province
- List of National Assembly members from Lumbini Province
- List of National Assembly members from Karnali Province
- List of National Assembly members from Sudurpashchim Province
