= Member of Parliament, Rastriya Sabha =

Democratically elected representative in the bicameral Federal Parliament of Nepal

- राष्ट्रिय सभा सदस्य
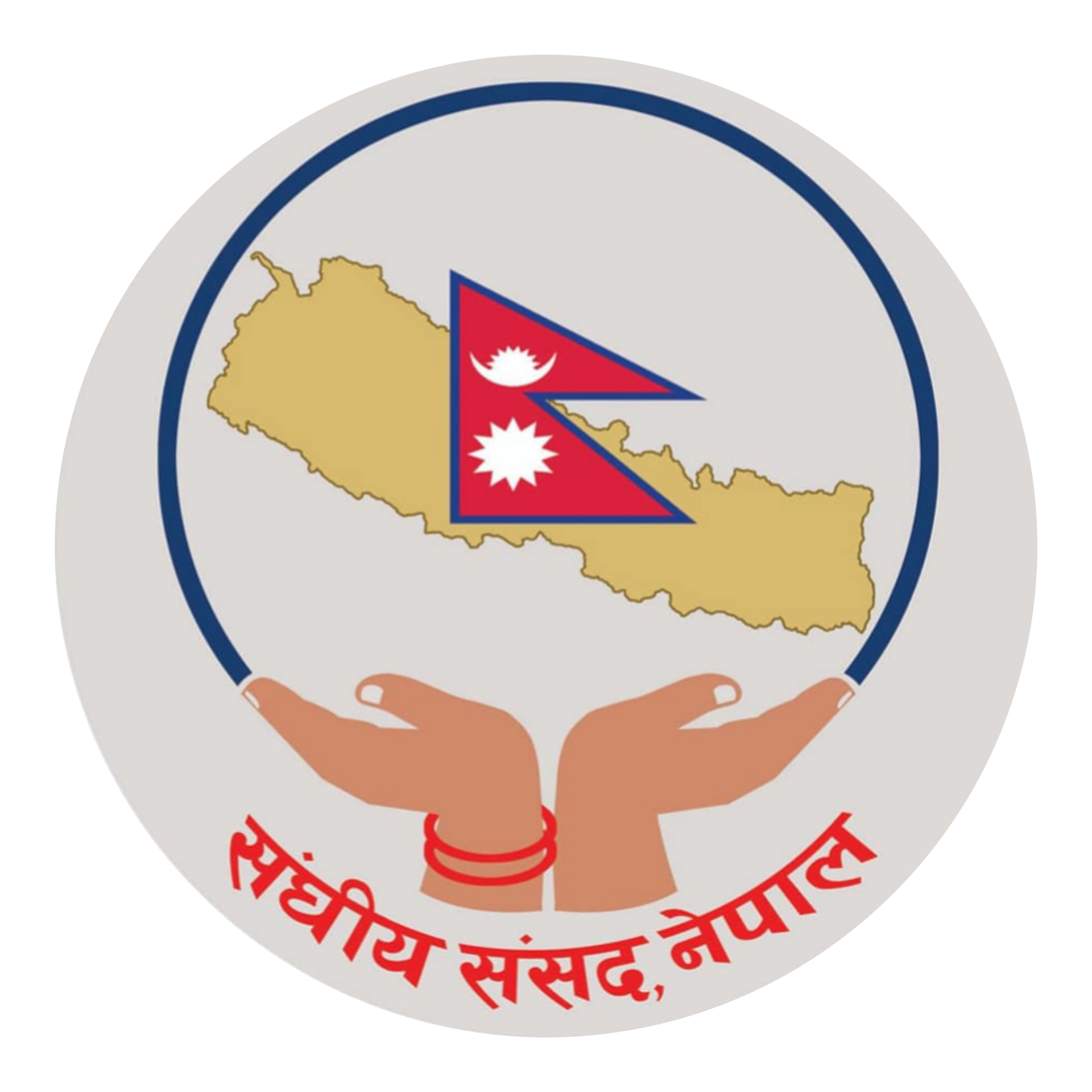
- Emblem of the Rastriya Sabha

- Flag of Nepal

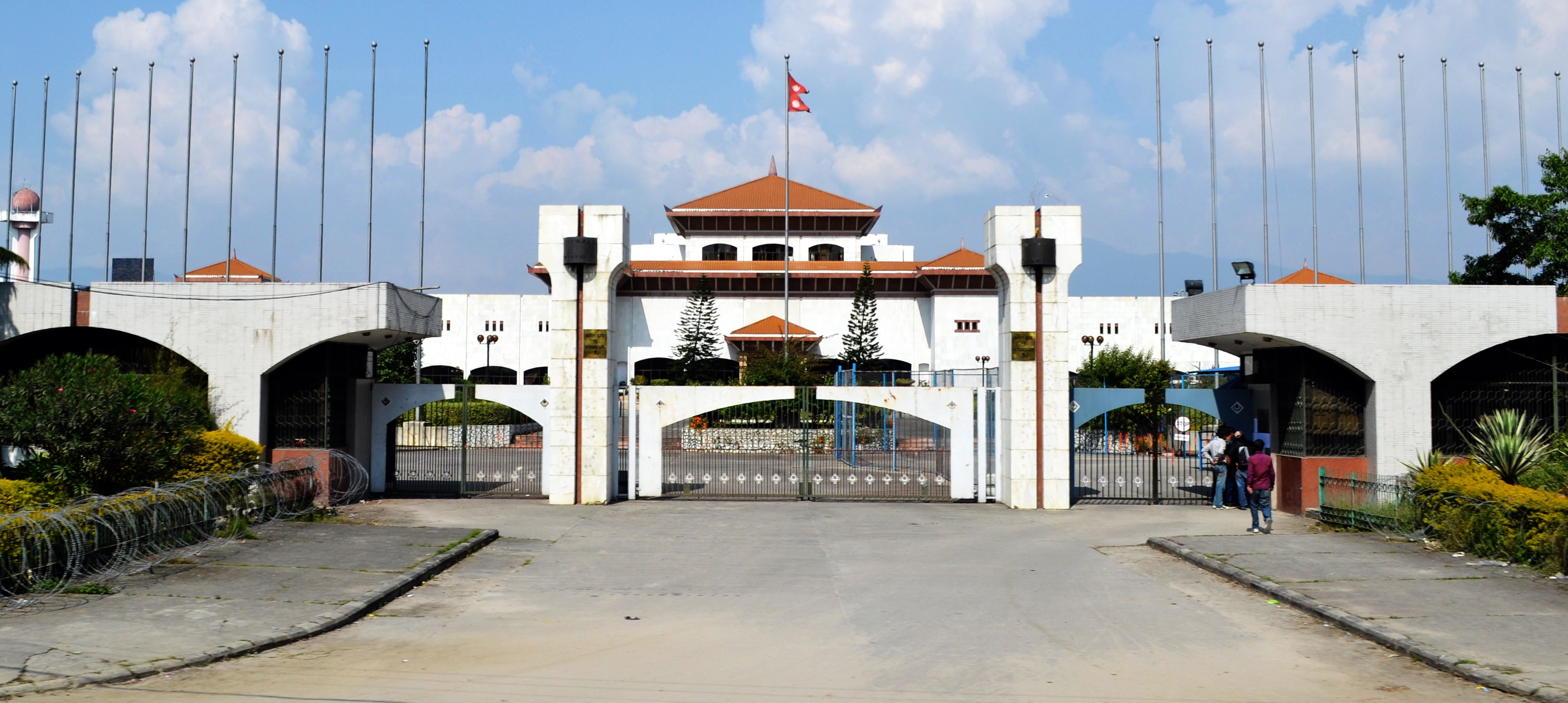
- Incumbent; Rastriya Sabha members since 4 March 2022
- Sanghiya Samsad
- Style: The Honourable (Inside Nepal); His/Her Excellency (Outside Nepal)
- Type: Member of Parliament
- Abbreviation: MP
- Member of: Rastriya Sabha
- Reports to: Chairperson
- Seat: Sanghiya Samsad Bhavan, Singha Durbar
- Appointer: Electorate of Nepal
- Term length: Six years; with one-third rotating out every two years.
- Constituting instrument: Article 87 of Constitution of Nepal
- Formation: 26 June 1991 (35 years ago)
- First holder: 1st Rastriya Sabha
- Salary: रू66,070 (US$440) per month (excl. allowances)
- Website: na.parliament.gov.np

A Member of Parliament in the Rastriya Sabha serves as a member of the upper house of the Federal Parliament of Nepal. The Rastriya Sabha comprises a total of 59 members, of which 56 are elected from the seven provinces by an electoral college. Additionally, three members are appointed by the President based on the recommendations of the government.One-third of the members rotate out every two years during their staggered six-year terms. The eight members from each province must include three women, one must be from the Dalit community, and one must be a disabled person or from a minority community.

All Members of the Rastriya Sabha rank 10th in the Order of precedence in Nepal.

== Eligibility criteria ==
According to Article 87 of the Constitution of Nepal and the National Assembly Election Act, 2017, to become a member of the Rastriya Sabha, the members must be:
(a) A citizen of Nepal
(b) A minimum of 35 years of age on the date of nomination
(c) Without a criminal offense conviction involving moral turpitude
(d) Not disqualified by any federal law
(e) Not hold any office of profit (paid by the government)
In addition, no member can serve in both the Pratinidhi Sabha and the Rastriya Sabha.

== Disqualification grounds ==
According to Article 89 of the Constitution of Nepal, a person would be ineligible to be a Member of the Rastriya Sabha if the person:
(a) Written resignation to the chairperson
(b) Does not comply with Article 87 of the Constitution of Nepal
(c) Expired term of office/house
(d) Unclarified/uninformed absence for ten consecutive house sessions
(e) Resignation/removal from the party to which the candidate was associated during the election
(f) Death

== Term ==
The term of a member of the Rastriya Sabha is six years, with one-third rotating out every two years.

== Composition/strength ==
The membership in the Rastriya Sabha is limited to 59. From each province, 8 members are elected to the Rastriya Sabha. The elected 56 members include at least three from the women cluster, one from the dalit cluster, and one from the person with disability or marginalized community cluster, and the rest are from the open category cluster. Rastriya Sabha members are elected by the Provincial assemblies member, mayors and deputy mayors of Municipalities, and presidents and deputy presidents of Rural municipalities. Three members, including one woman, are nominated by the President of Nepal on the recommendation of the Council of Ministers of Nepal.

== Responsibilities ==
The broad responsibilities of the Rastriya Sabha members include:

- Legislative responsibility: Review, revise, and pass the legislation passed by the House of Representatives.

== Salary, privileges, and allowances ==
Members of the Rastriya Sabha are entitled to a monthly salary of रू66,070 (US$440) and other allowances. This is in accordance with the Act relating to remuneration and facilities of officers and members of the Federal Parliament, 2016, which makes provision for remuneration, allowances, and privileges for members.

== See also ==
- Member of Parliament, Pratinidhi Sabha
- List of members of the National Assembly (Nepal)
- Federal Parliament of Nepal
