= B. P. Koirala cabinet =

Government of Nepal from 1959 to 1960

- Cabinet of Nepal
- May 1959–December 1960
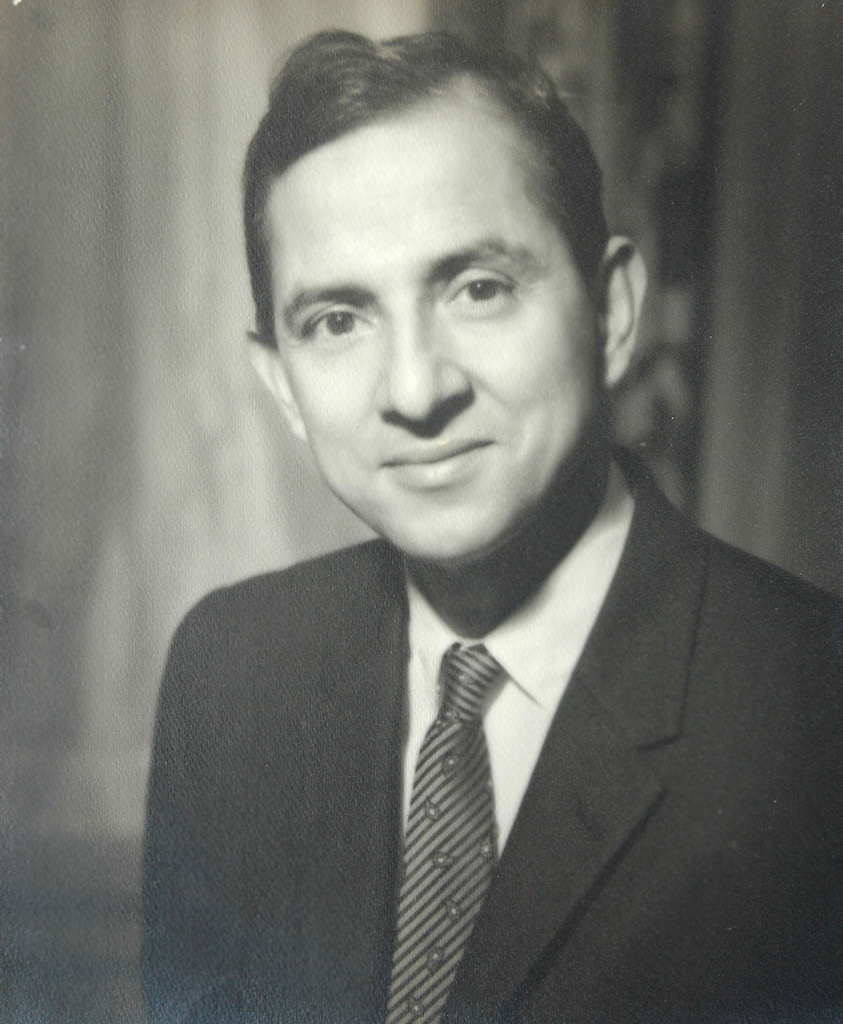
- B.P. Koirala
- Date formed: 27 May 1959
- Date dissolved: 15 December 1960

People and organisations
- Monarch: King Mahendra
- Prime Minister: Bishweshwar Prasad Koirala
- Total no. of members: 21 appointments
- Member party: Nepali Congress
- Status in legislature: Majority in Pratinidhi Sabha 74 / 109 (68%) Plurality in Mahasabha 13 / 36 (36%)
- Opposition party: Gorkha Parishad
- Opposition leaders: Mrigendra S.J.B. Rana

History
- Election: 1959 general election
- Legislature terms: 1st House of Representatives
- Predecessor: K.I. Singh cabinet, 1957
- Successor: K.P. Bhattarai cabinet, 1990

Bisheshwar Prasad Koirala formed the first elected government of Nepal on 27 May 1959. After the 1951 democratic movement, several transitional governments failed to hold the first general elections in the country until an interim government under Subarna SJB Rana held the 1959 general elections in two phases on 18 February and 3 April 1959. Nepali Congress gained a majority in the 1st House of Representatives of Nepal and Bishweshwar Prasad Koirala was elected as the parliamentary party leader of the Nepali Congress on 4 May 1959. On 16 May 1959, Koirala was invited by King Mahendra to form a government and the cabinet was formed on 27 May 1959. The cabinet was reshuffled just over a month later on 30 June 1959.

Koirala and the entire cabinet were arrested and the parliament was dissolved on 15 December 1960 as a result of a coup d'état by King Mahendra.

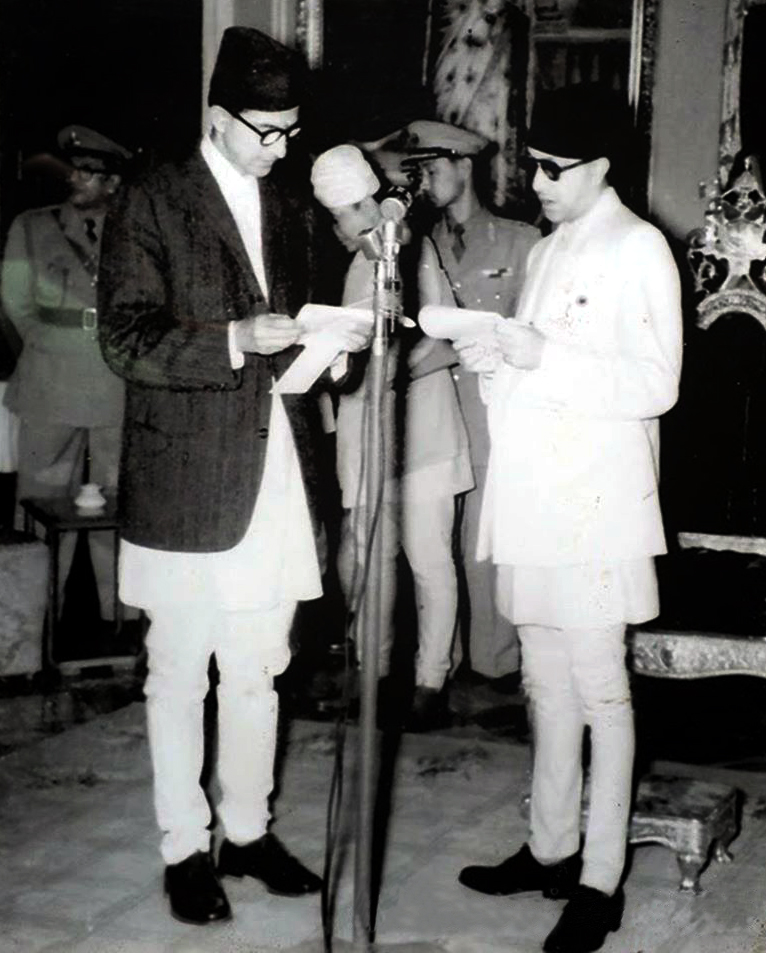
B.P. Koirala (left) taking oath of office from King Mahendra

== Cabinets ==
=== May–June 1959 ===
Portfolio	Minister	Took office
Cabinet Ministers
Prime Minister Minister of Foreign Affairs Minister of Defence	Hon. Bishweshwar Prasad Koirala	27 May 1959
Deputy Prime Minister Minister of Finance Minister of Planning and Development	Subarna SJB Rana	27 May 1959
Minister for Public Works and Canals Minister for Communications	Ganesh Man Singh	27 May 1959
Minister of Home Affairs Minister for Law	Surya Prasad Upadhyaya	27 May 1959
Minister for Industry and Commerce	Ram Narayan Mishra	27 May 1959
Minister of Health Minister for Local Autonomous Administration	Kashi Nath Gautam	27 May 1959
Minister for Education	Parshu Narayan Chaudhary	27 May 1959
Minister for Forest Department	Shiva Raj Panta	27 May 1959
Deputy Ministers
Deputy Minister for Food and Agriculture	Prem Raj Angdembe	27 May 1959
Deputy Minister for Parliamentary Affairs	Surya Nath Das Yadav	27 May 1959
Deputy Minister for Public Works and Canals Deputy Minister for Communications	Lalit Chand	27 May 1959
Deputy Minister of Health Deputy Minister for Local Autonomous Administration	Dwarika Devi Thakurani	27 May 1959
Deputy Minister of Defence	Min Bahadur Gurung	27 May 1959
Deputy Minister for Land Revenue	Jaman Singh Gurung	27 May 1959
Deputy Minister for Rural Development	Yogendra Man Sherchan	27 May 1959
Deputy Minister for Food and Agriculture Deputy Minister for Forest Department	Nev Bahadur Malla	27 May 1959
Deputy Minister for Rural Development	Dr. Tulsi Giri	27 May 1959
Deputy Minister of Finance and Income Tax	Shiva Prasad Shah	27 May 1959
Deputy Minister for Home Affairs	Diwan Singh Rai	27 May 1959
Deputy Minister for Law	Hora Prasad Joshi	27 May 1959
Deputy Minister for Planning and Development	Triveni Prasad Pradhan	27 May 1959

=== June 1959–December 1960 ===
Portfolio	Minister	Left office
Cabinet Ministers
Prime Minister Minister of Defence	Hon. Bishweshwar Prasad Koirala	15 December 1960
Deputy Prime Minister Minister of Finance Minister of Planning and Development	Subarna SJB Rana	15 December 1960
Minister of Public Works and Canals Minister of Communications	Ganesh Man Singh	15 December 1960
Minister of Home Affairs Minister of Law	Surya Prasad Upadhyaya	15 December 1960
Minister of Industry and Commerce	Ram Narayan Mishra	15 December 1960
Minister of Health Minister for Local Autonomous Administration	Kashi Nath Gautam	15 December 1960
Minister of Education	Parshu Narayan Chaudhary	15 December 1960
Minister of Food and Agriculture Minister for Forests	Shiva Raj Panta	15 December 1960
Minister for Parliamentary Affairs	Surya Nath Das Yadav	15 December 1960
Minister for Rural Development	Prem Raj Angdembe	15 December 1960
Minister of Foreign Affairs	Dr. Tulsi Giri	15 December 1960
Deputy Ministers
Deputy Minister for Planning and Development	Triveni Prasad Pradhan	15 December 1960
Deputy Minister for Communications Deputy Minister for Public Works and Canals	Lalit Chand	15 December 1960
Deputy Minister for Health Deputy Minister for Local Autonomous Administration	Dwarika Devi Thakurani	15 December 1960
Deputy Minister of Defence	Min Bahadur Gurung	15 December 1960
Deputy Minister of Land Revenue	Jaman Singh Gurung	15 December 1960
Deputy Minister for Forests	Nev Bahadur Malla	15 December 1960
Deputy Minister for Food and Agriculture	Yogendra Man Sherchan	15 December 1960
Deputy Minister for Finance and Income Tax	Shiva Prasad Shah	15 December 1960
Deputy Minister for Home Affairs	Diwan Singh Rai	15 December 1960
Deputy Minister for Law	Hora Prasad Joshi	15 December 1960
