= List of National Assembly members from Madhesh Province =

The National Assembly (Rastriya Sabha) is the Upper House of the Parliament of Nepal. Madhesh Province elects 8 seats and they are indirectly elected by the an electoral college of each province of Madhesh Province.

Out of the eight members from Madhesh province, three must be women, one must be from the Dalit community, and one must be a disabled person or from a minority community. Each elector gets four ballots; one for the three open seats, one for the three female seats, one for the dalit seat and one for the disabled or minority seat. The three open and three female seats are filled by Single transferable vote, the two other seats by FPTP.

== Current Members ==
Keys: Congress (3) PSP-Nepal (3) NCP (1) CPN (UML) (1)

Member	Party	Category	Date of appointment	Date of retirement	Portfolio & Responsibility
Mahantha Thakur	PSP-Nepal	Open	9 March 2026		
Ranjit Karna	Congress	Disability or Ethnic Minority	9 March 2026		
Rekha Kumari Jha	CPN (UML)	Women	9 March 2026		
Dharmendra Paswan	Congress	Dalit	9 March 2026		
Pooja Chaudhary	PSP-Nepal	Women	4 March 2024		
Ananda Prasad Dhungana	Congress	Open	4 March 2024		
Mohammad Khalid Siddiqui	PSP-Nepal	Open (Note: Succession of the four-year-term seat via the 2022 Nepalese National Assembly election)	4 March 2022		
Urmila Aryal	NCP	Women	4 March 2022		Vice-chair of the National Assembly (6 February 2023 - 28 March 2024)

== Former Members ==
Member	Party	Category	Date of appointment	Date of retirement	Notes
Tulsa Dahal	NCP; CPN (UML)	Women (Note: Succession of the two-year-term seat via the 2020 Nepalese National Assembly election)	4 March 2020	3 March 2026	
Mrigendra Singh Yadav	PSP-Nepal	Open	4 March 2020	3 March 2026	
Shekhar Singh	PSP-Nepal; LSP	Disability or Ethnic Minority	4 March 2020	3 March 2026	
Radheshyam Paswan	NCP; CPN (MC)	Dalit	4 March 2020	3 March 2026	
Suman Raj Pyakurel	NCP; CPN (UML)	Open	4 March 2018	3 March 2022	
Jitendra Narayan Dev	Congress	Open	4 March 2018	3 March 2024	
Pramila Kumari	PSP-Nepal	Women	4 March 2018	3 March 2024	
Shashikala Dahal	NCP; CPN (MC)	Women	4 March 2018	3 March 2022	
Mukta Kumari Yadav	Congress	Women	4 March 2018	3 March 2020	
Ramesh Prasad Yadav	RJPN	Disability or Ethnic Minority	18 March 2018	3 March 2020	
Brikhesh Chandra Lal	RJPN	Disability or Ethnic Minority	4 March 2018	3 March 2020	
Ramprit Paswan	Samajbadi Party, Nepal (2019)	Dalit	4 March 2018	3 March 2020	
