= Senate (Nepal) =

Senate महासभा
- Parliament of Nepal

Type
- Type: upper house of Nepal
- Sovereign: King of Nepal

History
- Founded: 12 February 1959
- Disbanded: 16 December 1962
- Succeeded by: Rastriya Panchayat
- Seats: 18 elected 18 nominated

Elections
- Voting system: Single transferable vote
- First election: 10 July 1959
- Last election: 10 July 1959

Meeting place
- Gallery Baithak, Kathmandu

Constitution
- Constitution of Nepal, 1959

The Senate of Nepal (Nepali: महासभा) was the upper house of the bicameral parliament of the Kingdom of Nepal from 1959 to 1962.

== History ==
The Revolution of 1951 made the process to enact a new constitution, which was able to transfer all executive powers back to the Shah kings from Rana regime. King Mahendra was unable to resist the increasingly well-orchestrated political demands by the Nepali National Congress for a more democratic and representative government, and was forced to promulgate a new constitution.

The Constitution of the Kingdom of Nepal, 1959 proclaimed on 12 February 1959, describes about Mahasabha (महासभा) as: "There shall be a Parliament which shall consist of His Majesty and two Houses, to be known respectively as the Senate (Maha Sabha) and the House of Representatives (Pratinidhi Sabha)" (Article No. 18, Constitution of the Kingdom of Nepal, 1959).

The only election to the Senate was held on 10 July 1959 following the 1959 general election. Nepali Congress won thirteen of the eighteen elected seats in the Senate. Gorkha Parishad won three, and Samyukta Prajatantra Party and Communist Party of Nepal won one seat each.

The constitution of Kingdom of Nepal, 1959 lasted till 16 December 1962. On 16 December 1962, the new Constitution of Kingdom of Nepal, 1962 was proclaimed and the parliament of the Kingdom of Nepal became unicameral.

== Membership ==
=== Qualification ===
Article 23, of the Constitution of 1959, set qualifications for senators: (1) they must be not be a sitting, voting or be qualified for election to the House of Representatives; (2) they must be citizens of Nepal; (3) they must be at least 30 years old; (3) they must not be servants of the crown.

=== Elections and term ===
The House of Representatives used single transferable vote to elect eighteen senators, and the King nominated eighteen senators to the Senate. Senators served six-year staggered terms, so that six members retire every year. The nominated senators of the 1st Senate were separated into thirds, where the terms of one-third expired after two years, the terms of another third of after four, and the terms of the last third expired every six years. The elected senators followed a similar process where a third would retire every two-years starting from the third year.

== Members of the Senate (1959–1960) ==
=== Elected Members ===
The election for the 1st Senate was held on 10 July 1959 following the 1959 general election.

Nepali Congress (13)

- Dolendra Bahadur Amatya
- Prem Chaitanya Bramhachari
- Sundar Raj Chalise
- Dhan Bahadur Chand
- Tulsi Giri
- Bakhan Singh Gurung
- Triveni Prasad Pradhan
- Bal Bahadur Rai
- Bramha S. J. B. Rana
- Dilip Kumar Shahi
- Bodh Prasad Upadhyaya
- Surya Prasad Upadhyaya
- Brijananda Verma

Nepal Rashtrabadi Gorkha Parishad (3)

- Shubha S. J. B. Rana
- Diwakar Sharma
- Nagendra Bahadur Swar

Samyukta Prajatantra Party (1)

- Piyush Raj Pandey

Communist Party of Nepal (1)

- Shambhu Ram Shrestha

=== Nominated Members ===
King Mahendra nominated eighteen members to the Senate on 13 July 1959.

- Mohammad Ahmeddin
- Pashupati Nath Ghosh
- Mani Harsha Jyoti
- Hora Prasad Joshi
- Sahshra Nath Kapali
- Ganesh Prasad Kharel
- Matrika Prasad Koirala
- Chhiring Tenzing Lama
- Mukti Nath Sharma
- Kamal Rana
- Nagendra Prasad Rijal
- Bal Chandra Sharma
- Bharat Mani Sharma
- Dil Bahadur Shrestha
- Dambar Bahadur Singh
- Laxman Jung Bahadur Singh
- Chandra Man Thakali
- Surya Bahadur Thapa

== See also ==
- National Assembly (Nepal)
