= List of National Assembly members from Bagmati Province =

The National Assebmly (Rastriya Sabha) is the Upper House of the Parliament of Nepal. Bagmati Province elects 8 seats and they are indirectly elected by the an electoral college of each province of Bagmati Province.

Out of the eight members from Bagmati province, three must be women, one must be from the Dalit community, and one must be a disabled person or from a minority community. Each elector gets four ballots; one for the three open seats, one for the three female seats, one for the dalit seat and one for the disabled or minority seat. The three open and three female seats are filled by Single transferable vote, the two other seats by FPTP.

== Current Members ==
Keys: CPN (UML) (1) Congress (4) NCP (3)

Member	Party	Category	Date of appointment	Date of retirement
Prem Prasad Dangal	CPN (UML)	Open	9 March 2026	
Gita Devkota	Congress	Women	9 March 2026	
Jit Jung Basnet	Congress	Open	4 March 2024	
Shri Krishna Adhikari	NCP	Disability or Ethnic Minority	4 March 2024	
Bishnu Devi Pudasaini	Congress	Women	4 March 2024	
Ghanashyam Rijal	NCP	Dalit	4 March 2024	
Krishna Prasad Paudel	Congress	Open (Note: Succession of the two-year-term seat via the 2020 Nepalese National Assembly election)	4 March 2022	
Goma Devi Timilsina	NCP	Women	4 March 2022	

== Former Members ==
Member	Party	Category	Date of appointment	Date of retirement	Portfolio and Responsibility
Khim Lal Devkota	Independent	Open (Note: Succession via by-election caused due to expulsion of sitting member, Ram Bahadur Thapa, from CPN (Maoist Centre))	28 May 2021	3 March 2024	
Beduram Bhusal	NCP; CPN (UML); CPN (Unified Socialist)	Open	4 March 2020	3 March 2026	Parliamentary party leader of CPN (Unified Socialist); Chair of Legislative Management Committee
Ganga Belbase	NCP; CPN (Maoist Centre)	Women	4 March 2020		Whip of CPN (Maoist Centre)
Singha Bahadur Bishwakarma	NCP CPN (UML); CPN (Unified Socialist)	Dalit	4 March 2018	3 March 2024	
Ramchandra Rai Danuwar	NCP; CPN (UML)	Disability or Ethnic Minority	4 March 2018	3 March 2024	
Parvati Rawal	NCP; CPN (UML)	Women	4 March 2018	3 March 2024	
Udaya Sharma	NCP; CPN (UML)	Women	4 March 2018	3 March 2022	
Radheshyam Adhikari	Congress	Open	4 March 2018	3 March 2022	
Ram Bahadur Thapa	NCP; CPN (Maoist Centre)	Open	4 March 2018	18 April 2021	
Dhana Khatiwada	Congress	Women	4 March 2018	3 March 2020	
Balram Baskota	NCP; CPN (UML)	Open	4 March 2018	3 March 2020	
