= Kaski 3 =

Parliamentary constituency in Nepal

- Parliamentary constituency for the House of Representatives
- Kaski 3 in Gandaki Province

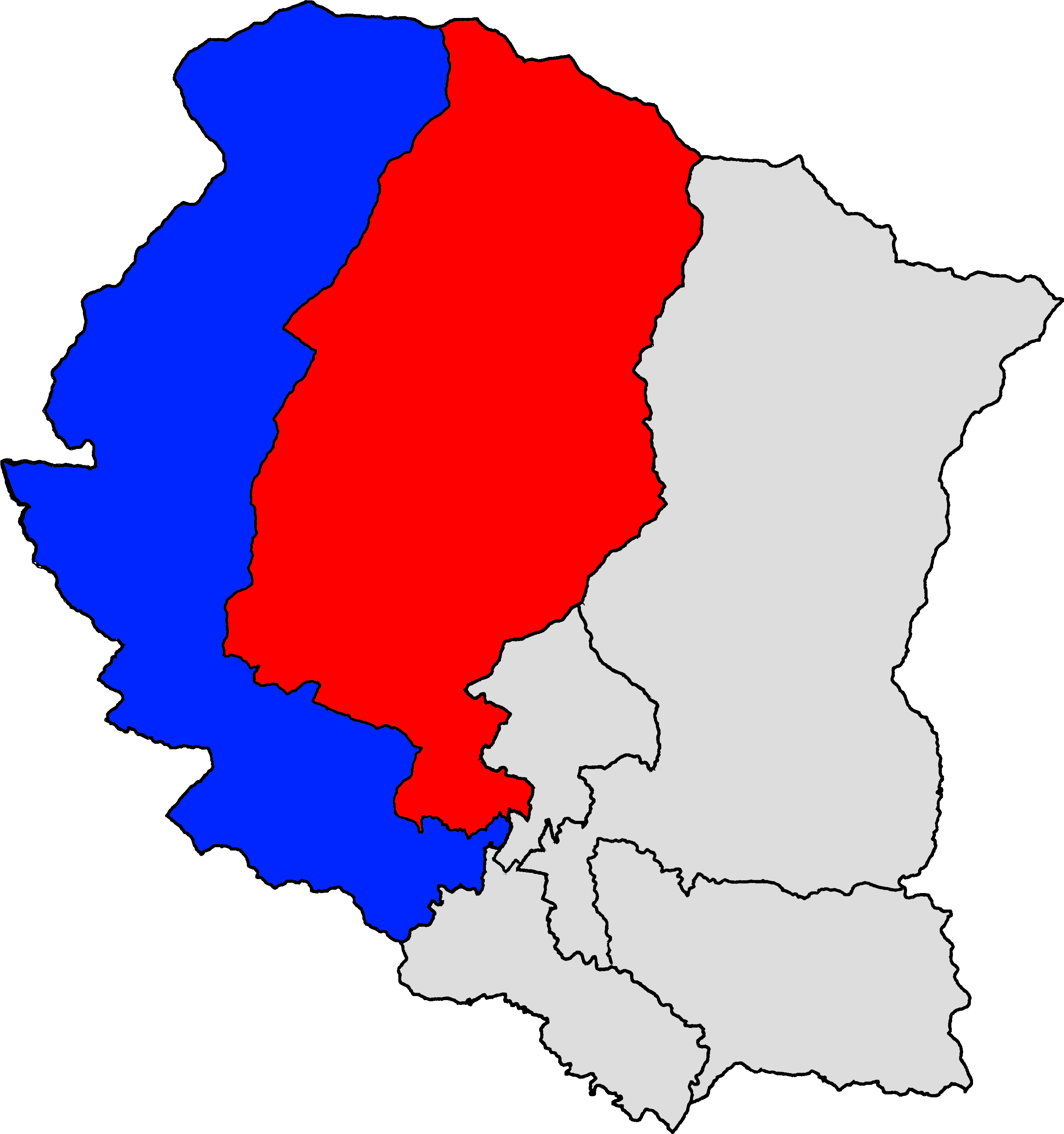
- Assembly segments Kaski 3(A) and Kaski 3(B) within Kaski District
- Province: Gandaki Province
- District: Kaski District
- Electorate: 101,715

Current constituency
- Created: 1991
- Party: Rastriya Swatantra Party
- MP: Bina Gurung
- Gandaki MPA 3(A): Ramji Prasad Baral (NCP)
- Gandaki MPA 3(B): Rajiv Pahari (NCP)

Kaski 3 is one of three parliamentary constituencies of Kaski District in Nepal. This constituency came into existence on the Constituency Delimitation Commission (CDC) report submitted on 31 August 2017.

== Incorporated areas ==
Kaski 3 incorporates Annapurna Rural Municipality, Machhapuchchhre Rural Municipality and wards 1–3, 5, 6, 18, 19 and 22–25 of Pokhara Metropolitan City.

== Assembly segments ==
It encompasses the following Gandaki Provincial Assembly segment

- Kaski 3(A)
- Kaski 3(B)

== Members of Parliament ==
=== Parliament/Constituent Assembly ===
Election	Member	Party
1991	Somnath Adhikari Pyasi	CPN (Unified Marxist–Leninist)
1994	Krishna Bahadur Gurung	Nepali Congress
1999	Prakash Bahadur Gurung	Nepali Congress
2008	Rabindra Prasad Adhikari	CPN (Unified Marxist–Leninist)
2017	Jagat Bahadur Sunar	CPN (Unified Marxist–Leninist)
May 2018	Jagat Bahadur Sunar	Nepal Communist Party
March 2021	Jagat Bahadur Sunar	CPN (Unified Marxist–Leninist)
2022	Damodar Paudel Bairagi	CPN (Unified Marxist–Leninist)
2026	Bina Gurung	Rastriya Swatantra Party

=== Provincial Assembly ===
==== 3(A) ====
Election	Member	Party
2017	Ramji Prasad Baral	CPN (Maoist Centre)
May 2018	Ramji Prasad Baral	Nepal Communist Party

==== 3(B) ====
Election	Member	Party
2017	Rajiv Pahari	CPN (Unified Marxist-Leninist)
May 2018	Rajiv Pahari	Nepal Communist Party

== Election results ==
=== Election in the 2020s ===
==== 2026 general election ====
Candidate	Party	Votes	%
Bina Gurung	Rastriya Swatantra Party	37,750	60.26
Manoj Gurung	Nepali Congress	12,780	20.40
Damodar Poudel Bairagi	CPN (UML)	7,906	12.62
Gopal Giri	Nepali Communist Party	1,456	2.32
Arjun Prasd Khanal	Rastriya Prajatantra Party	1,406	2.24
Others		1,351	2.16
Total		62,649	100.00
Valid votes		62,649	97.45
Invalid/blank votes		1,638	2.55
Total votes		64,287	100.00
Registered voters/turnout		107,560	59.77
Majority		24,970	
Rastriya Swatantra Party gain			
Source: GorkhaPatra

==== 2022 general election ====
Candidate	Party	Votes	%
Damodar Paudel Bairagi	CPN (UML)	22,980	39.59
Ramji Prasad Baral	CPN (Maoist Centre)	17,535	30.21
Yog Raj Paudel	Rastriya Swatantra Party	12,180	20.98
Jagat Prasad Subedi	Rastriya Prajatantra Party	2,442	4.21
Others		2,914	5.02
Total		58,051	100.00
Majority		5,445	
CPN (UML) hold			

==== 2022 provincial election ====
===== 3(A) =====
Candidate	Party	Votes	%
Ganesh Man Gurung	CPN (UML)	14,473	46.39
Durga Dutt Bhandari	CPN (Maoist Centre)	9,662	30.97
Kedar Nath Paudel	Rastriya Prajatantra Party	3,697	11.85
Khim Prasad Timilsina	Hamro Nepali Party	2,515	8.06
Others	849	2.72	
Total		31,196	100.00
Majority		4,811	
CPN (UML)			

===== 3(B) =====
Candidate	Party	Votes	%
Prakash Baral	Nepali Congress	12,367	44.63
Rajiv Pahari	CPN (UML)	11,902	42.95
Hariram Bhandari	Rastriya Prajatantra Party	2,560	9.24
Others	884	3.19	
Total		27,713	100.00
Majority		465	
Nepali Congress			

=== Election in the 2010s ===
==== 2017 legislative elections ====
Party	Candidate	Votes
CPN (Unified Marxist–Leninist)	Jagat Bahadur Sunar	32,690
Nepali Congress	Shukra Raj Sharma	24,304
Others		2,702
Invalid votes		2,139
Result	CPN (UML) gain	
Source: Election Commission

==== 2017 Nepalese provincial elections ====
===== 3(A) =====
Party	Candidate	Votes
CPN (Maoist Centre)	Ramji Prasad Baral	15,823
Nepali Congress	Sharada Devi Paudel	13,057
Others		2,972
Invalid votes		867
Result	Maoist Centre gain	
Source: Election Commission

===== 3(B) =====
Party	Candidate	Votes
CPN (Unified Marxist–Leninist)	Rajiv Pahari	16,167
Nepali Congress	Sikandar Gurungl	8,325
Others		828
Invalid votes		605
Result	CPN (UML) gain	
Source: Election Commission

==== 2013 Constituent Assembly election ====
Party	Candidate	Votes
CPN (Unified Marxist–Leninist)	Rabindra Prasad Adhikari	13,110
Nepali Congress	Sobhiyat Bahadur Adhikari	10,808
UCPN (Maoist)	Ramji Prasad Baral	4,431
Others		2,659
Result	CPN (UML) gain	
Source: NepalNews

=== Election in the 2000s ===
==== 2008 Constituent Assembly election ====
Party	Candidate	Votes
CPN (Unified Marxist–Leninist)	Rabindra Prasad Adhikari	13,386
CPN (Maoist)	Jhalak Pani Tiwari	10,926
Nepali Congress	Binda Devi Rana Magar	9,041
Others		3,416
Invalid votes		1,240
Result	CPN (UML) gain	
Source: Election Commission

=== Election in the 1990s ===
==== 1999 legislative elections ====
Party	Candidate	Votes
Nepali Congress	Prakash Bahadur Gurung	18,739
CPN (Unified Marxist–Leninist)	Somnath Adhikari Pyasi	16,091
Rastriya Prajatantra Party	Chandra Man Gurung	4,374
CPN (Marxist–Leninist)	Mina Raj Paudel	1,406
Others		685
Invalid Votes		832
Result	Congress hold	
Source: Election Commission

==== 1994 legislative elections ====
Party	Candidate	Votes
Nepali Congress	Krishna Bahadur Gurung	14,980
CPN (Unified Marxist–Leninist)	Somnath Adhikari Pyasi	14,831
Rastriya Prajatantra Party	Chandra Man Gurung	6,430
Others		252
Result	Congress gain	
Source: Election Commission

==== 1991 legislative elections ====
Party	Candidate	Votes
CPN (Unified Marxist–Leninist)	Somnath Adhikari Pyasi	17,818
Nepali Congress		16,253
Result	CPN (UML) gain	

== See also ==
- List of parliamentary constituencies of Nepal
