= Bina Gurung =

Nepalese politician

Honourable Bina Gurung
- विणा गुरुङ
- Bina Gurung in 2026

Member of Parliament, Pratinidhi Sabha
- Incumbent
- Assumed office 26 March 2026
- Preceded by: Damodar Paudel Bairagi
- Constituency: Kaski 3

Personal details
- Born: 26 January 1973 (age 53) Parbat District, Nepal
- Citizenship: Nepalese
- Party: Rastriya Swatantra (since 2026)
- Spouse: Dhan Bahadur Gurung
- Children: 2
- Parent: Jung Bir Gurung (father)
- Profession: Politician
- Website: binagurung.com

Bina Gurung (Note: Nepali: विणा गुरुङ) (born 16 January 1973) is a Nepalese politician of Rastriya Swatantra Party, currently serving as a member of parliament. She was elected to the Pratinidhi Sabha, the lower house of the Federal Parliament of Nepal from the Kaski 3 parliamentary constituency in the 2026 Nepalese General Election. She secured 37,750 votes and defeated Manoj Gurung of the Nepali Congress. She is the only female lawmaker elected from Gandaki Province to the Pratinidhi Sabha in 2026.

== Personal and academic life ==
Gurung was born in Parbat District, on January 26, 1973. She was born to Jung Bir Gurung. She passed her secondary level school at Prithvi Narayan Campus, Pokhara. She was married to Dhan Bahadur Gurung and has 2 children.

== Social work ==
Gurung was active in social work and women's empowerment. She is the founding chair of Sanjeevani Sisters Association (Sanjivani Didibahini Kendra Nepal), which supports and trains women. She is a central member of Tamu Dhin Nepal, an organisation of the Gurung community, and has been involved with the Tamu Cultural Foundation, Kopila Nepal and the Lions Club. She has also served as a director of several businesses. She took part in relief and health supply distribution after the 2015 earthquake and during the COVID-19 pandemic.

== Politics ==
She joined the Rastriya Swatantra Party in 2026 to contest in the 2026 Nepalese general election from the Kaski 3 constituency.

She had not been affiliated with any political party before joining the RSP following the Gen Z protests of September 2025, and serves as treasurer of the party's Kaski district committee. She was the party's only woman candidate in Gandaki Province.

She won the seat with 37,750 of the 65,407 votes cast, defeating Manoj Gurung of the Nepali Congress by 24,970 votes. After her election, she said her priorities would include tourism promotion, women's entrepreneurship, resolving the problems of victims of cooperative fraud, and infrastructure development.

== Electoral performance ==
Election	Year	Constituency	Contested for	Political party	Result	Votes	% of votes	Ref.
Nepal general election	2026	Kaski 3	Pratinidhi Sabha member	Rastriya Swatantra Party	Won	37,750	60.25%	
