= List of National Assembly members from Karnali Province =

The National Assembly (Rastriya Sabha) is the Upper House of the Parliament of Nepal. Karnali Province elects 8 seats and they are indirectly elected by the an electoral college of each province of Karnali Province.

Out of the eight members from Karnali province, three must be women, one must be from the Dalit community, and one must be a disabled person or from a minority community. Each elector gets four ballots; one for the three open seats, one for the three female seats, one for the dalit seat and one for the disabled or minority seat. The three open and three female seats are filled by Single transferable vote, the two other seats by FPTP.

== Current Members ==
Keys: Congress (3) NCP (4) CPN (UML) (1)

| Member | Party | Category | Date of appointment | Date of retirement |
|---|---|---|---|---|
| Meena Singh Rakhal | CPN (UML) | Women | 9 March 2026 | |
| Lalit Jung Shahi | Congress | Open | 9 March 2026 | |
| Krishna Bahadur Rokaya | Congress | Open | 4 March 2024 | |
| Bishnu BK | NCP | Dalit | 4 March 2024 | |
| Savitri Malla | NCP | Women | 4 March 2024 | |
| Durga Gurung | Congress | Women (Note: Succession of the four-year-term seat via the 2022 Nepalese National Assembly election) | 4 March 2022 | |
| Nar Bahadur Bista | NCP | Disability or Ethnic Minority | 4 March 2022 | |
| Udaya Bohara | NCP | Open | 4 March 2022 | |

== Former Members ==
| Member | Party | Category | Date of appointment | Date of retirement | Notes |
|---|---|---|---|---|---|
| Maya Prasad Sharma | NCP; CPN (MC) | Open (Note: Succession of the two-year-term seat via the 2020 Nepalese National Assembly election) | 4 March 2020 | 3 March 2026 | Chair of Delegated Management and Government Assurance Committee |
| Sumitra B.C. | NCP; CPN (UML) | Women | 4 March 2020 | 3 March 2026 | |
| Nanda Sharma | NCP; CPN (MC); CPN (Unified Socialist) | Women | 4 March 2018 | 3 March 2024 | |
| Bhairav Sundar Shrestha | NCP; CPN (UML) | Open | 4 March 2018 | 3 March 2024 | |
| Nar Pati Luwar | NCP; CPN (UML) | Dalit | 4 March 2018 | 3 March 2024 | |
| Thagendra Puri | NCP; CPN (UML) | Open | 4 March 2018 | 3 March 2022 | |
| Kabita Bogati | NCP; CPN (UML) | Women | 4 March 2018 | 3 March 2022 | |
| Jeevan Budha | NCP; CPN (MC) | Disability or Ethnic Minority | 4 March 2018 | 3 March 2022 | |
| Kali Bahadur Malla | NCP; CPN (MC) | Open | 4 March 2018 | 3 March 2020 | |
| Yutul Lama | NCP; CPN (MC) | Women | 4 March 2018 | 3 March 2020 | |
