= List of National Assembly members from Gandaki Province =

The National Assembly (Rastriya Sabha) is the Upper House of the Parliament of Nepal. Gandaki Province elects 8 seats and they are indirectly elected by the an electoral college of each province of Gandaki Province.

Out of the eight members from Gandaki province, three must be women, one must be from the Dalit community, and one must be a disabled person or from a minority community. Each elector gets four ballots; one for the three open seats, one for the three female seats, one for the dalit seat and one for the disabled or minority seat. The three open and three female seats are filled by Single transferable vote, the two other seats by FPTP.

== Current members ==
Keys: Congress (4) NCP (3) CPN (UML) (1)

Member	Party	Category	Date of appointment	Date of retirement
Jagat Timilsina	Congress	Open	9 March 2026	
Samjhana Devkota	CPN (UML)	Women	9 March 2026	
Padma Bahadur Pariyar	Congress	Dalit	4 March 2024	
Manrupa Sharma	NCP	Women	4 March 2024	
Kiran Babu Shrestha	Congress	Open	4 March 2024	
Bhuwan Sunar	NCP	Dalit (Note: Succession of the four-year-term seat via the 2022 Nepalese National Assembly election)	4 March 2022	
Kamala Pant	Congress	Women	4 March 2022	
Suresh Ale Magar	NCP	Open	4 March 2022	

== Former Members ==
Member	Party	Category	Date of appointment	Date of retirement	Notes
Bhagwati Neupane	NCP; CPN (UML)	Women (Note: Succession of the two-year-term seat via the 2020 Nepalese National Assembly election)	4 March 2020	18 January 2026	Chief Whip of CPN (UML)
Narayan Kaji Shrestha	NCP; CPN (MC)	Open	4 March 2020	18 January 2026	Parliamentary Party leader of CPN (MC); Deputy prime minister and Minister for Physical Infrastructure and Transport
Ganesh Prasad Timilsina	NCP; CPN (UML)	Open	4 March 2018	3 March 2024	
Prakash Pant	Congress	Disability or Ethnic Minority	4 March 2018	3 March 2024	
Dipa Gurung	NCP; CPN (UML)	Women	4 March 2018	3 March 2024	
Dina Nath Sharma	NCP; CPN (MC)	Open	4 March 2018	3 March 2022	
Shanti Adhikari	NCP; CPN (UML)	Women	4 March 2018	3 March 2022	
Khim Bahadur BK	NCP; CPN (MC)	Dalit	4 March 2018	3 March 2022	
Surendra Raj Pandey	Congress	Open	4 March 2018	3 March 2020	
Brinda Rana Magar	Congress	Women	4 March 2018	3 March 2020	
