= List of National Assembly members from Sudurpashchim Province =

The National Assembly (Rastriya Sabha) is the Upper House of the Parliament of Nepal. Sudurpashchim Province elects 8 seats and they are indirectly elected by the an electoral college of each province of Sudurpashchim Province.

Out of the eight members from Sudurpashchim province, three must be women, one must be from the Dalit community, and one must be a disabled person or from a minority community. Each elector gets four ballots; one for the three open seats, one for the three female seats, one for the dalit seat and one for the disabled or minority seat. The three open and three female seats are filled by Single transferable vote, the two other seats by FPTP.

== Current Members ==
Keys: Congress (3) NCP (3) CPN (UML) (1)

Member	Party	Category	Date of appointment	Date of retirement
Khamma Bahadur Khati	Congress	Open	9 March 2026	
Lila Kumari Bhandari	CPN (UML)	Women	9 March 2026	
	Open			
Renu Chand	NCP	Women	4 March 2024	
Narayan Bhatta	Congress	Disability or Ethnic Minority	4 March 2024	
Narayan Dutta Mishra	Congress	Open (Note: Succession of the four-year-term seat via the 2022 Nepalese National Assembly election)	4 March 2022	
Jagar Parki	NCP	Dalit	4 March 2022	
Madan Kumari Shah	NCP	Women	4 March 2022	

== Former Members ==
Member	Party	Category	Date of appointment	Date of retirement	Notes
Baldev Bohara	Congress	Open	4 March 2024	14 January 2026	
Sharada Bhatta	NCP; CPN (UML)	Women (Note: Succession of the two-year-term seat via the 2020 Nepalese National Assembly election)	4 March 2020	3 March 2026	
Taraman Swar	NCP; CPN (MC)	Open	4 March 2020	3 March 2026	
Mahesh Kumar Mahara	NCP; CPN (MC)	Disability or Ethnic Minority	4 March 2018	3 March 2024	
Sher Bahadur Kunwar	NCP; CPN (UML)	Open	4 March 2018	3 March 2022	
Hari Ram Chaudhary	NCP; CPN (MC)	Open	4 March 2018	3 March 2024	
Indu Kadariya	NCP; CPN (UML)	Women	4 March 2018	3 March 2024	
Tara Devi Joshi	Congress	Women	4 March 2018	3 March 2022	
Chakra Prasad Snehi	NCP; CPN (UML)	Dalit	4 March 2018	3 March 2022	
Badri Pandey	Congress	Open	4 March 2018	3 March 2020	
Kamala Oli	NCP; CPN (UML)	Women	4 March 2018	3 March 2020	
