= Bimala Ghimire =

Nepali politician

Deputy Chairperson of the Rastriya Sabha
- In office 10 April 2024 – 4 March 2026
- President: Ram Chandra Paudel
- Chairman: Narayan Prasad Dahal
- Preceded by: Urmila Aryal
- Succeeded by: Lila Kumari Bhandari

Personal details
- Party: CPN (UML)

Bimala Ghimire is a Nepalese politician. She was elected deputy chairperson of the Rastriya Sabha on 10 April 2024.
