= Ram Prit Paswan =

Ram Prit Paswan may refer to:

- Ram Prit Paswan (Indian politician)
- Ram Prit Paswan (Nepalese politician)
