= Deputy Chairperson of the National Assembly (Nepal) =

Second highest authority of the upper house of the Parliament of Nepal

- राष्ट्रिय सभाका उपाध्यक्ष
- Emblem of Nepal

- Flag of Nepal
- Incumbent; Lila Kumari Bhandari since 6 April 2026
- National Assembly
- Style: The Right Honourable
- Status: Deputy presiding officer
- Seat: Federal Parliament Building, Singha Durbar, Kathmandu
- Nominator: Parliamentary party
- Appointer: Elected by National Assembly
- Term length: At the House's pleasure; elected at the beginning of the new National Assembly by a majority of the representatives, and upon a vacancy.
- Constituting instrument: Article 92 of the Constitution of Nepal
- Formation: 1959; 67 years ago
- First holder: Kamal Rana (1959)
- Salary: रू
- Website: na.parliament.gov.np

The Deputy Chairperson of the National Assembly in Nepal is the second highest-ranking officer in the Nepal's upper house of parliament, the National Assembly. The position of deputy chairperson holds significant importance in the legislative process, presiding over the proceedings, maintaining order, and ensuring fair debate and discussion in the absence of Chairperson. The current deputy chairperson is Lila Kumari Bhandari since 6 April 2026.

== List of Deputy Chairpersons ==
Deputy Chairpersons of the National Assembly
Name	Party	Took office	Left office
Maha Sabha
Kamal Rana	Independent	21 July 1959	15 December 1962
Parliament of the Kingdom of Nepal
Aishwarya Lal Pradhananga	Nepali Congress	4 July 1991	30 December 1991
Dilip Kumar Shahi	Nepali Congress	20 March 1992	26 June 1997
Chiranjibi Prasad Rijal	Nepali Congress	27 July 1997	27 June 2001
Ram Prit Paswan	CPN (UML)	10 August 2001	24 April 2006
Federal Parliament of Nepal
Shashikala Dahal	CPN (Maoist Centre)	18 March 2018	4 March 2022
Urmila Aryal	CPN (Maoist Centre)	6 February 2023	28 March 2024
Bimala Ghimire	CPN (UML)	10 April 2024	4 March 2026
Lila Kumari Bhandari	CPN (UML)	6 April 2026	Incumbent
