= 2026 Nepalese National Assembly election =

- 25 January 2026

19 seats to the National Assembly

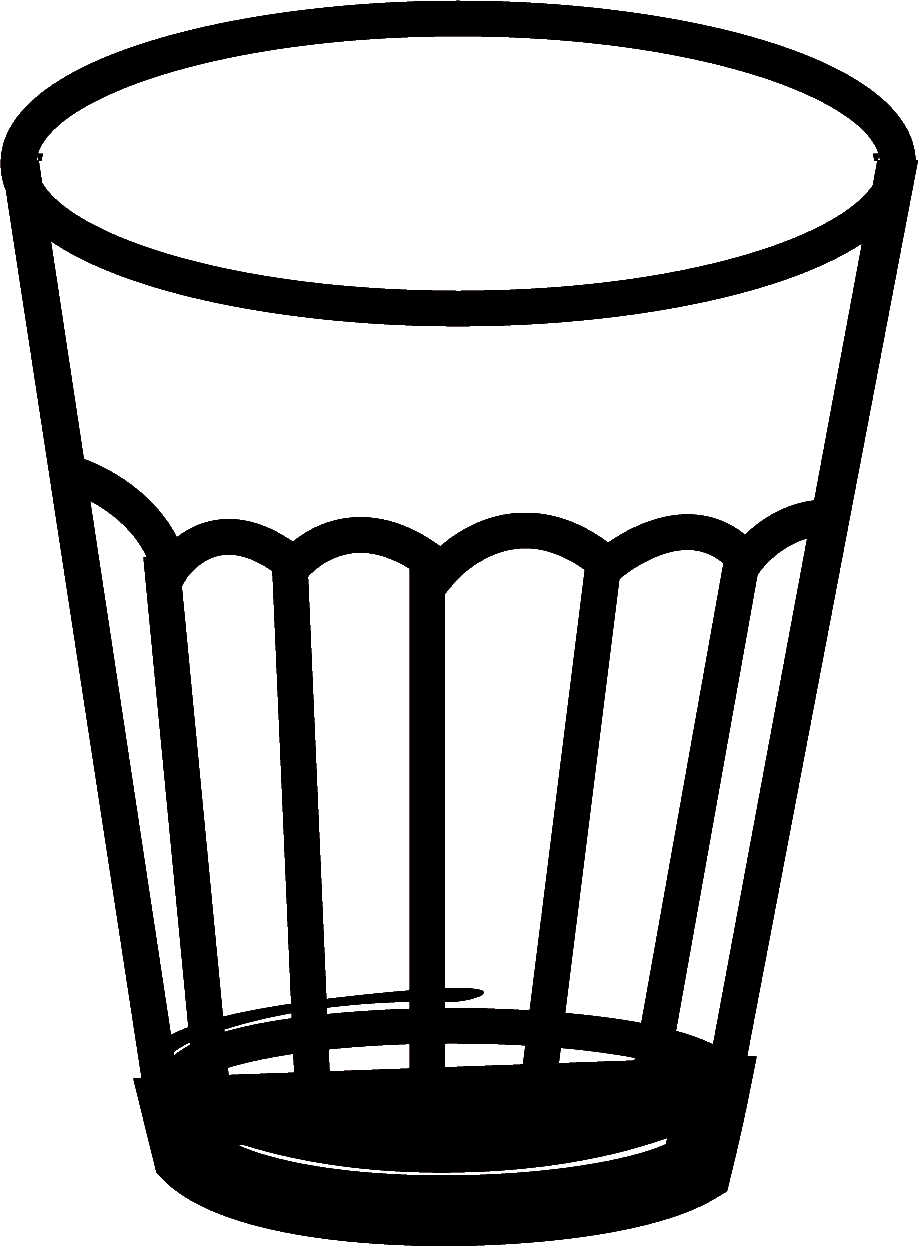
	First party	Second party	Third party
Party	Congress	NCP	CPN (UML)
Seats before	15	25	11
Seats after	24	17	11
Seat change	▲9	▼8	Steady
	Fourth party	Fifth party	Sixth party
Party	PSP-Nepal	Loktantrik Samajwadi	Janamorcha
Seats before	3	1	1
Seats after	2	1	1
Seat change	▼1	Steady	Steady
Chairperson of the National Assembly before election
Narayan Prasad Dahal
Maoist Centre
Elected Chairperson of the National Assembly
Narayan Prasad Dahal
Maoist Centre

National Assembly elections were held in Nepal on 25 January 2026 in order to elect 18 of the 19 retiring Class I members of the National Assembly, the upper house of the Federal Parliament of Nepal. Members of the National Assembly are elected through indirect ballot and serve six year terms with one third of the members retiring after every two years.

== Electoral system ==
Eight members of the National Assembly are elected from each of the seven provinces of Nepal and 3 members are appointed by the president for a total of 59 members. Composition of members from each province have to include three women, a Dalit, and a disabled person or member of a minority. The three remaining are categorized as open/other candidates. All members elected from this election must be from the same category as the retiring members.

Members were elected by Instant-runoff voting by an electoral college composed of members of the respective provincial assembly and chairperson/mayor and vice chairperson/deputy mayor of the local levels within the province. Each provincial assembly member vote has a weight of forty-eight whereas each chairperson/mayor/vice chairperson/deputy mayor vote have a weight of eighteen. This electoral college will elect 19 members while 1 member, whose term will also end concurrently, will be nominated by the president on the recommendation of the Government of Nepal.

=== Qualification for members ===
According to Article 87 of the Constitution, a person who meets the following criteria is qualified to become a member of the National Assembly:

- citizen of Nepal,
- completed the age of thirty five years,
- not having been convicted of a criminal offense involving moral turpitude,
- not being disqualified by any Federal law, and
- not holding any office of profit.

== Results ==
Party	Seats				
Party	Total before	Up	Won	Total after	+/–
Nepali Congress	15	0	9	24	+9
Nepali Communist Party	24	7	0	17	–7
CPN (UML)	9	7	8	10	+1
People's Socialist Party, Nepal	3	1	0	2	–1
Loktantrik Samajwadi Party, Nepal	1	1	1	1	0
Rastriya Janamorcha	1	0	0	1	0
Nominated members	2	0	0	2	0
Vacant	4	2	0	2	–2
Total	59	18	18	59	0
