= List of parliamentary constituencies of Nepal =

House of Representatives प्रतिनिधि सभा

Type
- Type: Lower house of the Federal Parliament of Nepal
- Term limits: 5 years

History
- Preceded by: 2nd Nepalese Constituent Assembly
- Seats: 275

Elections
- Voting system: Parallel voting: 165 seats – FPTP; 110 seats – PR
- Last election: 5 March 2026

Meeting place
- Sansad Bhawan, Singha Durbar

Website
- hr.parliament.gov.np/np

Location of Nepal within Asia

The House of Representatives of Nepal is the lower house of the country's Federal Parliament. It is housed at the Sansad Bhawan, Singha Durbar in the capital Kathmandu. The current 7th House of Representatives was elected by the general elections held on 5 March 2026, and its first session convened on 26 March 2026.

The House has 275 members; 165 are elected from single-member constituencies by first-past-the-post voting and 110 are elected through a proportional electoral system where voters cast ballots for political parties, considering the whole country as an at-large constituency. The House of Representatives continues to operate for five years from the date appointed for its first meeting, unless dissolved earlier.

The current constituencies are based on the Constituency Delimitation Commission (CDC) report submitted on 31 August 2017. According to the constitution, the new constituencies cannot be altered for 20 years (until 2037) and cannot be challenged in any court of law.

== History ==
History of the Nepalese parliamentary constituencies
Year	Details	Elected constituencies	Elections
1990	The 1990 constitution lifted the ban on political parties and created a new lower house (the House of Representatives) with 205 constituencies.	205	1991, 1994, 1999
2008	A Constituent Assembly was elected to draft a new constitution. There were 240 members elected from single-seat constituencies and 335 elected via proportional representation.	240	2008, 2013
2015	The 2015 Constitution of Nepal was ratified by the Constituent Assembly. The new House of Representatives has 165 directly elected members and 110 elected via proportional representation.	165	2017, 2022

== Constituencies ==
House of Representatives constituencies of Nepal. Protected areas are shown in black.

Constituencies of the Federal Parliament of Nepal
No.	Province	District	Constituency	Electorate (2022)
1	Koshi	Taplejung	Taplejung 1	88,285
2	Koshi	Panchthar	Panchthar 1	138,932
3	Koshi	Ilam	Ilam 1	109,535
4	Koshi	Ilam	Ilam 2	115,342
5	Koshi	Jhapa	Jhapa 1	120,375
6	Koshi	Jhapa	Jhapa 2	134,091
7	Koshi	Jhapa	Jhapa 3	131,432
8	Koshi	Jhapa	Jhapa 4	123,124
9	Koshi	Jhapa	Jhapa 5	154,289
10	Koshi	Sankhuwasabha	Sankhuwasabha 1	117,554
11	Koshi	Tehrathum	Tehrathum 1	71,933
12	Koshi	Bhojpur	Bhojpur 1	123,379
13	Koshi	Dhankuta	Dhankuta 1	116,991
14	Koshi	Morang	Morang 1	123,615
15	Koshi	Morang	Morang 2	124,729
16	Koshi	Morang	Morang 3	149,833
17	Koshi	Morang	Morang 4	110,093
18	Koshi	Morang	Morang 5	100,494
19	Koshi	Morang	Morang 6	126,761
20	Koshi	Sunsari	Sunsari 1	141,878
21	Koshi	Sunsari	Sunsari 2	149,566
22	Koshi	Sunsari	Sunsari 3	125,432
23	Koshi	Sunsari	Sunsari 4	128,065
24	Koshi	Solukhumbu	Solukhumbu 1	81,502
25	Koshi	Khotang	Khotang 1	142,792
26	Koshi	Okhaldhunga	Okhaldhunga 1	117,897
27	Koshi	Udayapur	Udayapur 1	135,525
28	Koshi	Udayapur	Udayapur 2	93,421
29	Madhesh	Saptari	Saptari 1	113,195
30	Madhesh	Saptari	Saptari 2	95,394
31	Madhesh	Saptari	Saptari 3	104,892
32	Madhesh	Saptari	Saptari 4	104,893
33	Madhesh	Siraha	Siraha 1	106,201
34	Madhesh	Siraha	Siraha 2	107,465
35	Madhesh	Siraha	Siraha 3	109,271
36	Madhesh	Siraha	Siraha 4	99,775
37	Madhesh	Dhanusha	Dhanusha 1	118,628
38	Madhesh	Dhanusha	Dhanusha 2	124,755
39	Madhesh	Dhanusha	Dhanusha 3	114,009
40	Madhesh	Dhanusha	Dhanusha 4	117,195
41	Madhesh	Mahottari	Mahottari 1	98,497
42	Madhesh	Mahottari	Mahottari 2	99,707
43	Madhesh	Mahottari	Mahottari 3	99,930
44	Madhesh	Mahottari	Mahottari 4	98,896
45	Madhesh	Sarlahi	Sarlahi 1	122,487
46	Madhesh	Sarlahi	Sarlahi 2	116,223
47	Madhesh	Sarlahi	Sarlahi 3	127,834
48	Madhesh	Sarlahi	Sarlahi 4	112,494
49	Madhesh	Rautahat	Rautahat 1	102,436
50	Madhesh	Rautahat	Rautahat 2	100,716
51	Madhesh	Rautahat	Rautahat 3	104,290
52	Madhesh	Rautahat	Rautahat 4	108,013
53	Madhesh	Bara	Bara 1	119,375
54	Madhesh	Bara	Bara 2	105,011
55	Madhesh	Bara	Bara 3	103,148
56	Madhesh	Bara	Bara 4	105,970
57	Madhesh	Parsa	Parsa 1	77,679
58	Madhesh	Parsa	Parsa 2	86,966
59	Madhesh	Parsa	Parsa 3	90,432
60	Madhesh	Parsa	Parsa 4	90,851
61	Bagmati	Dolakha	Dolakha 1	161,450
62	Bagmati	Ramechhap	Ramechhap 1	180,106
63	Bagmati	Sindhuli	Sindhuli 1	107,136
64	Bagmati	Sindhuli	Sindhuli 2	101,233
65	Bagmati	Rasuwa	Rasuwa 1	39,459
66	Bagmati	Dhading	Dhading 1	132,354
67	Bagmati	Dhading	Dhading 2	133,642
68	Bagmati	Nuwakot	Nuwakot 1	120,752
69	Bagmati	Nuwakot	Nuwakot 2	118,974
70	Bagmati	Kathmandu	Kathmandu 1	45,018
71	Bagmati	Kathmandu	Kathmandu 2	81,970
72	Bagmati	Kathmandu	Kathmandu 3	58,889
73	Bagmati	Kathmandu	Kathmandu 4	69,752
74	Bagmati	Kathmandu	Kathmandu 5	70,919
75	Bagmati	Kathmandu	Kathmandu 6	62,102
76	Bagmati	Kathmandu	Kathmandu 7	61,291
77	Bagmati	Kathmandu	Kathmandu 8	53,106
78	Bagmati	Kathmandu	Kathmandu 9	72,173
79	Bagmati	Kathmandu	Kathmandu 10	76,906
80	Bagmati	Bhaktapur	Bhaktapur 1	102,528
81	Bagmati	Bhaktapur	Bhaktapur 2	91,911
82	Bagmati	Lalitpur	Lalitpur 1	74,397
83	Bagmati	Lalitpur	Lalitpur 2	81,897
84	Bagmati	Lalitpur	Lalitpur 3	94,116
85	Bagmati	Kavrepalanchok	Kavrepalanchok 1	152,621
86	Bagmati	Kavrepalanchok	Kavrepalanchok 2	157,442
87	Bagmati	Sindhupalchok	Sindhupalchok 1	130,709
88	Bagmati	Sindhupalchok	Sindhupalchok 2	129,564
89	Bagmati	Makwanpur	Makwanpur 1	150,578
90	Bagmati	Makwanpur	Makwanpur 2	150,578
91	Bagmati	Chitwan	Chitwan 1	124,215
92	Bagmati	Chitwan	Chitwan 2	144,282
93	Bagmati	Chitwan	Chitwan 3	115,379
94	Gandaki	Gorkha	Gorkha 1	115,397
95	Gandaki	Gorkha	Gorkha 2	105,240
96	Gandaki	Manang	Manang 1	6,779
97	Gandaki	Lamjung	Lamjung 1	133,559
98	Gandaki	Kaski	Kaski 1	110,715
99	Gandaki	Kaski	Kaski 2	79,138
100	Gandaki	Kaski	Kaski 3	101,715
101	Gandaki	Tanahun	Tanahun 1	123,490
102	Gandaki	Tanahun	Tanahun 2	125,005
103	Gandaki	Syangja	Syangja 1	127,411
104	Gandaki	Syangja	Syangja 2	116,678
105	Gandaki	Nawalpur (Note: When Nepal was subdivided into 7 provinces in 2015, the area in Nawalparasi District was split into 2 districts in different provinces. Nawalpur District (or Nawalparasi (East of Bardaghat Susta) district) went to Gandaki Province, while Nawalparasi (West of Bardaghat Susta) district (or Parasi District) went to Lumbini Province.)	Nawalparasi (Bardaghat Susta East) 1	131,181
106	Gandaki	Nawalpur	Nawalparasi (Bardaghat Susta East) 2	129,280
107	Gandaki	Mustang	Mustang 1	10,957
108	Gandaki	Myagdi	Myagdi 1	86,120
109	Gandaki	Baglung	Baglung 1	96,666
110	Gandaki	Baglung	Baglung 2	95,561
111	Gandaki	Parbat	Parbat 1	122,649
112	Lumbini	Gulmi	Gulmi 1	119,288
113	Lumbini	Gulmi	Gulmi 2	104,327
114	Lumbini	Palpa	Palpa 1	96,033
115	Lumbini	Palpa	Palpa 2	105,293
116	Lumbini	Arghakhanchi	Arghakhanchi 1	164,768
117	Lumbini	Nawalparasi (West of Bardaghat Susta)	Nawalparasi (Bardaghat Susta West) 1	139,560
118	Lumbini	Nawalparasi (West of Bardaghat Susta)	Nawalparasi (Bardaghat Susta West) 2	126,807
119	Lumbini	Rupandehi	Rupandehi 1	132,791
120	Lumbini	Rupandehi	Rupandehi 2	110,659
121	Lumbini	Rupandehi	Rupandehi 3	129,135
122	Lumbini	Rupandehi	Rupandehi 4	141,013
123	Lumbini	Rupandehi	Rupandehi 5	121,676
124	Lumbini	Kapilvastu	Kapilvastu 1	115,543
125	Lumbini	Kapilvastu	Kapilvastu 2	121,676
126	Lumbini	Kapilvastu	Kapilvastu 3	115,543
127	Lumbini	Eastern Rukum	Eastern Rukum 1	34,112
128	Lumbini	Rolpa	Rolpa 1	145,471
129	Lumbini	Pyuthan	Pyuthan 1	159,760
130	Lumbini	Dang	Dang 1	134,733
131	Lumbini	Dang	Dang 2	133,748
132	Lumbini	Dang	Dang 3	146,475
133	Lumbini	Banke	Banke 1	121,100
134	Lumbini	Banke	Banke 2	97,809
135	Lumbini	Banke	Banke 3	113,322
136	Lumbini	Bardiya	Bardiya 1	162,662
137	Lumbini	Bardiya	Bardiya 2	152,622
138	Karnali	Salyan	Salyan 1	157,701
139	Karnali	Dolpa	Dolpa 1	22,774
140	Karnali	Mugu	Mugu 1	35,485
141	Karnali	Jumla	Jumla 1	68,368
142	Karnali	Kalikot	Kalikot 1	80,733
143	Karnali	Humla	Humla 1	32,857
144	Karnali	Jajarkot	Jajarkot 1	103,363
145	Karnali	Dailekh	Dailekh 1	78,282
146	Karnali	Dailekh	Dailekh 2	80,676
147	Karnali	Surkhet	Surkhet 1	120,940
148	Karnali	Surkhet	Surkhet 2	122,674
149	Karnali	Western Rukum	Western Rukum 1	104,280
150	Sudurpaschim	Bajura	Bajura 1	83,567
151	Sudurpaschim	Achham	Achham 1	79,036
152	Sudurpaschim	Achham	Achham 2	79,621
153	Sudurpaschim	Bajhang	Bajhang 1	122,376
154	Sudurpaschim	Doti	Doti 1	124,870
155	Sudurpaschim	Kailali	Kailali 1	106,703
156	Sudurpaschim	Kailali	Kailali 2	104,906
157	Sudurpaschim	Kailali	Kailali 3	107,659
158	Sudurpaschim	Kailali	Kailali 4	110,453
159	Sudurpaschim	Kailali	Kailali 5	105,793
160	Sudurpaschim	Darchula	Darchula 1	89,154
161	Sudurpaschim	Baitadi	Baitadi 1	150,156
162	Sudurpaschim	Dadeldhura	Dadeldhura 1	91,201
163	Sudurpaschim	Kanchanpur	Kanchanpur 1	99,110
164	Sudurpaschim	Kanchanpur	Kanchanpur 2	105,577
165	Sudurpaschim	Kanchanpur	Kanchanpur 3	97,822

== Constituencies by province ==
Parliamentary constituencies per province
Province	Number of constituencies
Koshi	28
Madhesh	32
Bagmati	33
Gandaki	18
Lumbini	26
Karnali	12
Sudurpashchim	16

== See also ==
- List of constituencies of the Lok Sabha
- List of constituencies of the Bhutan National Assembly
