= List of nominated members of the National Assembly (Nepal) =

The National Assembly is the Upper House of the Federal Parliament of Nepal. Three are appointed by the President on the recommendation of the government.

== Current Members ==
Keys: NCP (1) CPN (UML) (1)

Member	Party	Category	Date of appointment	Date of retirement	Portfolio & Responsibility
Vacant					
Anjan Shakya	CPN (UML)	Nominated	18 April 2024		
Narayan Prasad Dahal	NCP	Nominated	12 April 2022		Chairman of the National Assembly

== Former Members ==
Member	Party	Category	Date of appointment	Date of retirement	Notes
Bam Dev Gautam	NCP; CPN (MC); CPN (Unified Socialist)	Nominated	17 September 2020	18 January 2026	
Bimala Rai Paudyal	NCP; CPN (UML)	Nominated	10 March 2018	3 March 2024	
Ram Narayan Bidari	NCP; CPN (MC)	Nominated	10 March 2018	3 March 2022	
Yuba Raj Khatiwada	NCP; CPN (UML)	Nominated	10 March 2018	3 March 2020	
