= Ram Prit Paswan (Nepalese politician) =

Nepali Communist Politician

- रामप्रित पासवान

Deputy Chairperson of the Rastriya Sabha
- In office 10 August 2001 – 24 April 2006
- Monarch: Birendra
- Chairman: Mohammad Mohsin
- Preceded by: Chiranjibi Prasad Rijal
- Succeeded by: Shashikala Dahal

Member of the National Assembly
- In office 2001–2006
- Constituency: Madhesh Province

Personal details
- Born: Saptari, Nepal
- Party: Communist Party of Nepal (Unified Socialist)

Ram Prit Paswan (Nepali: रामप्रित पासवान) is a Nepalese communist politician belonging to CPN (Unified Socialist). Paswan is the former Deputy Chairperson of the Rastriya Sabha.

Paswan is also currently deputy incharge of party for Madhesh Province.
