= List of National Assembly members from Lumbini Province =

The National Assembly (Rastriya Sabha) is the Upper House of the Parliament of Nepal. Lumbini Province elects 8 seats and they are indirectly elected by the an electoral college of each province of Lumbini Province.

Out of the eight members from Lumbini province, three must be women, one must be from the Dalit community, and one must be a disabled person or from a minority community. Each elector gets four ballots; one for the three open seats, one for the three female seats, one for the dalit seat and one for the disabled or minority seat. The three open and three female seats are filled by Single transferable vote, the two other seats by FPTP.

== Current Members ==
Keys: Congress (4) CPN (UML) (1) NCP (2) Janamorcha (1)

Member	Party	Category	Date of appointment	Date of retirement
Basudev Ghimire	Congress	Disability/Ethnic Minority	9 March 2026	
Ram Kumari Jhakri	CPN (UML)	Women	9 March 2026	
Chandra Bahadur K.C.	Congress	Open	9 March 2026	
Jhakku Prasad Subedi	NCP	Open	4 March 2024	
Vishnu Kumari Sapkota	Congress	Women	4 March 2024	
Yubaraj Sharma	Congress	Open (Note: Succession of the four-year-term seat via the 2022 Nepalese National Assembly election)	4 March 2022	
Tul Prasad Bishwakarma	Janamorcha	Dalit	4 March 2022	
Rajya Laxmi Gaire	NCP	Women	4 March 2022	

== Former Members ==
Member	Party	Category	Date of appointment	Date of retirement	Notes
Kumar Dasaudi	CPN (UML)	Open	10 February 2023	4 March 2024	
Dirgha Narayan Pandey	Congress	Open	9 June 2021	3 March 2022	
Bimala Ghimire	NCP; CPN (UML)	Women (Note: Succession of the two-year-term seat via the 2020 Nepalese National Assembly election)	4 March 2020	3 March 2026	Vice-chair of the Rastriya Sabha (since 10 April 2024)
Gopal Bhattarai	NCP; CPN (UML)	Open	4 March 2020	3 March 2026	
Jag Prasad Sharma	NCP; CPN (Maoist Centre)	Disability or Ethnic Minority	4 March 2020	3 March 2026	
Anita Devkota	Congress	Women	4 March 2018	3 March 2024	
Ram Lakhan Harijan	NCP; CPN (UML)	Dalit	4 March 2018	3 March 2022	
Komal Oli	NCP; CPN (UML)	Women	4 March 2018	3 March 2022	
Khim Lal Bhattarai	NCP; CPN (UML)	Open	4 March 2018	10 October 2022	
Chandra Bahadur Khadka	NCP; CPN (Maoist Centre)	Open	4 March 2018	28 April 2021	
Raj Kumar Kunwar	NCP; CPN (Maoist Centre)	Disability or Ethnic Minority	4 March 2018	3 March 2020	
Mina Budha	NCP; CPN (UML)	Women	4 March 2018	3 March 2020	
Durga Prasad Upadhyaya	Congress	Open	4 March 2018	3 March 2020	
