= Urmila Aryal =

Nepali politician

The Right Honourable Urmila Aryal
- उर्मिला अर्याल

Deputy Chairperson of the National Assembly
- In office 6 February 2023 – 28 March 2024
- President: Bidya Devi Bhandari; Ram Chandra Paudel
- Chairman: Ganesh Prasad Timilsina
- Preceded by: Shashikala Dahal
- Succeeded by: Bimala Ghimire

Member of Parliament, Rastriya Sabha
- Incumbent
- Assumed office 4 March 2022
- Preceded by: Shashikala Dahal
- Constituency: Madhesh Province

Personal details
- Party: Communist Party of Nepal (Maoist Centre)
- Other political affiliations: Communist Party of Nepal (Unified Marxist-Leninist)

Urmila Aryal (Nepali: उर्मिला अर्याल) is a Nepalese politician. She is a member of the Central Committee of the Communist Party of Nepal (Maoist Centre).

Aryal came second in the Parsa-4 seat in the 1994 legislative election with 9288 votes, losing to Nepali Congress candidate Ramesh Rijal. In 1999 legislative election she defeated Rijal, winning the seat with 17095 votes.

In May 2006, she was named Minister for Women, Children and Social Welfare.

Aryal is currently the number four candidate of CPN(UML) in the proportional representation list for the Constituent Assembly election.

She left CPN-UML to join UCPN-(Maoist) and contested the 2013 Constituent Assembly election from Parsa-5. She lost to Jaya Prakash Tharu of CPN-UML election by coming third with 7340 votes.

She was born in Parsa District, Province No. 2, Nepal.
