= Udaya Bohara =

Nepali politician

Honourable Udaya Bohara
- उदय बोहरा

Member of Rastriya Sabha
- Incumbent
- Assumed office 2018
- Prime Minister: Sher Bahadur Deuba
- Preceded by: Position created
- Constituency: Karnali Province

Personal details
- Party: CPN (Unified Socialist)

Udaya Bohara (Nepali: उदय बोहरा) is a Nepali politician belonging to CPN (Unified Socialist). Bohara is also member of Rastriya Sabha and was elected from 2022 Nepalese National Assembly election.
