= Bhadrakali Temple, Kathmandu =

Religious temple in Nepal

Bhadrakali Temple
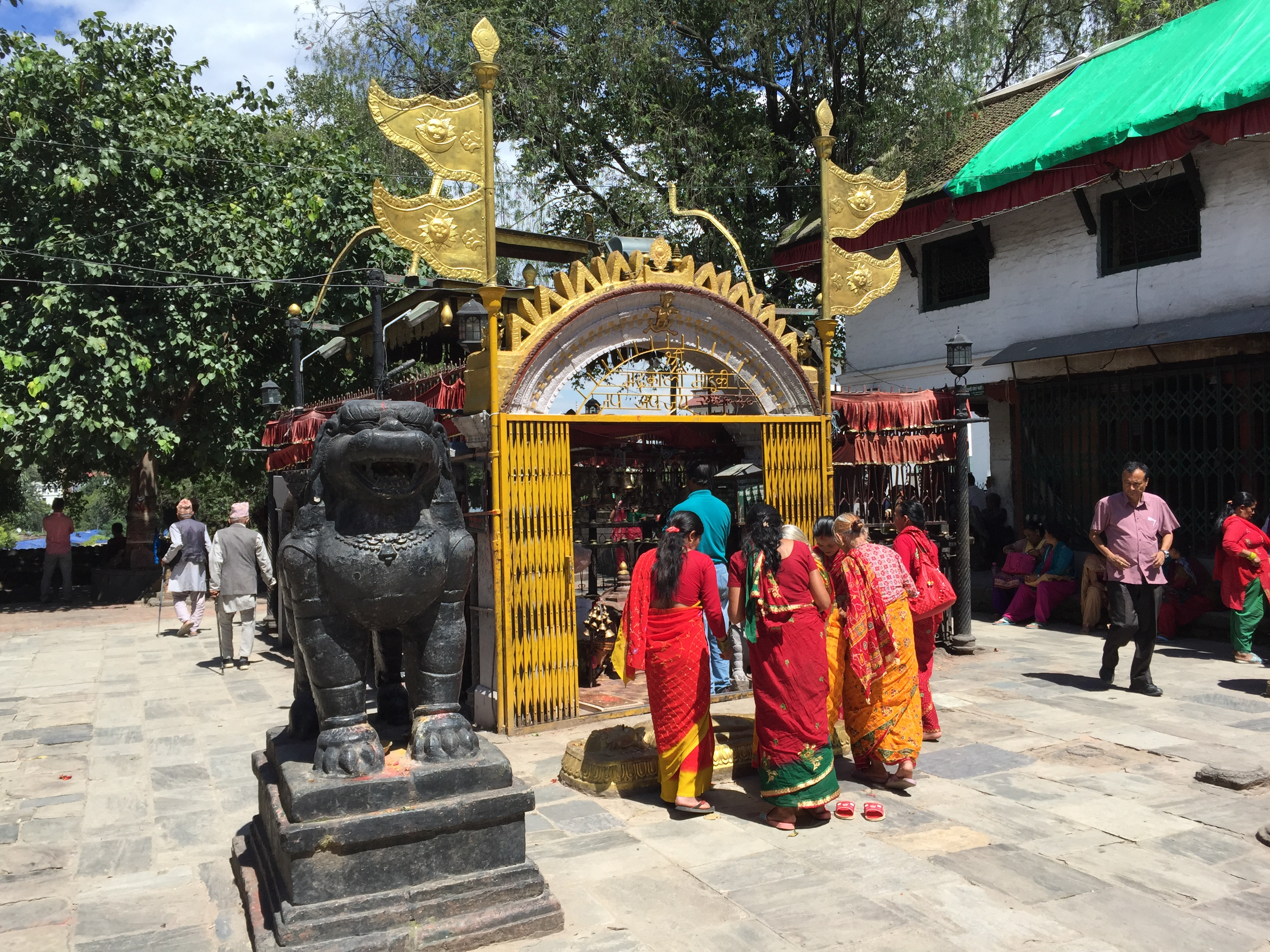

- Location within Kathmandu

Religion
- Affiliation: Hinduism
- District: Kathmandu
- Deity: Goddess Bhadrakali
- Festivals: Navaratri, Dashain, Paahacharey

Location
- Location: Kathmandu
- State: Bagmati
- Country: Nepal
- Coordinates: 27.6993°N 85.3168°E

Architecture
- Type: Pagoda

Bhadrakali Temple (Nepali: भद्रकाली मन्दिर, lit. 'Decent Kali') is a Hindu temple dedicated to Devi Bhadrakali. It is located in Kathmandu, Nepal, next to Tundikhel.

It is located near the Sahid Gate. The temple is at the eastern side of Tundikhel. This temple is also known as Shree Lumadhi Bhadrakali. It is one of the most renowned "Shakta pitha" of Nepal. A form of the Goddess Kali, Bhadrakali in Sanskrit means "blessed, auspicious, beautiful and prosperous" and she is also known as "Gentle Kali". Another name for the goddess is Lazzapith.

== History ==
The temple was built in the year 1817 and was previously known as "Mudule Thumpko”. The temple is believed to be built after Goddess Bhadrakali told the priest to dig the hill where they found her statue. Since then, the temple lies there and is protected by the Nepal Army. It overlooks the Singha Durbar, Prime Ministerial office, on the eastern side.

== Legend ==
Bhadrakali bears influences from the western part of India. The ancient writings in the Vayu Purana and Mahabharat explain the creation of Bhadrakali by the Devi’s wrath when Daksha insulted Lord Shiva during the great Ashvamedha Yagya (Horse Sacrifice). Tantra Rahasya mentions her rising from the north face of Lord Shiva, (Uttaramnaya Amnayas) which is blue in color and has three eyes. She is believed to take on a terrible aspect that is represented with three eyes and four, twelve or eighteen hands carrying weapons with flames flowing from her head and a small tusk sticking out from her mouth. According to the myths, a farmer used to plough land nearby and kept his food (bread) on the side. The bread used to turn into gold so the temple got its name as Lumarhi/Lumdi Devi’s temple as Lumdi in Newari means ‘golden bread’.

Goddess Bhadrakali is also widely worshipped in East India during Dusshera Festivals specifically.

== Deity ==
The main murti is a black stone statue of Bhadrakali and is believed to have been enshrined by the Lichchhavi kings. They are religiously linked to Nepalese Hindus and are looked up to by many people.

== Festivals ==
The major festival celebrated here is Dashain, which takes place usually during the months of September–October (as per the traditional Hindu Calendar).

People worship the protector goddesses of Lumadhi Ajima, Watu Ajima and Kanga Ajima on three-day increments. Nyatamaru Ajima goddesses Jatra observed during 12 years of Nyata Maru Ajima Pahacharhe is one of the most important festival of Kathmandu.

== Nepali Army ==
Bhadrakali is the patron Deity of the Nepal Army.
