= Constituencies of Nepal =

Electoral divisions of Nepal

In Nepal, the House of Representatives (Parliamentary) has 165 constituencies (165 first-past-the-post constituencies and one nationwide constituency from which 110 members are elected by proportional representation), whilst the seven provincial assemblies have a total of 337 constituencies (330 first-past-the-post constituencies and seven province-wide constituencies elected by proportional representation). The current constituencies are based on the Constituency Delimitation Commission (CDC) report submitted on 31 August 2017. As per the constitution, the new constituencies cannot be altered for another 20 years (until 2037) and cannot be challenged in any court of law.

== Parliamentary Constituencies ==
There are 165 Parliamentary Constituencies in Nepal extended into 7 provinces of Nepal.

Provinces	Constituencies
Koshi Province	28
Madhesh Pradesh	32
Bagmati Province	33
Gandaki Province	18
Lumbini Province	26
Karnali Province	12
Sudurpashchim Province	16
Total	165

== Provincial Constituencies ==
Provincial Constituency mean Constituencies of Assembly of Nepalese Provinces. The number of Provincial constituencies are double of the Parliamentary Constituencies.

Provinces	Assembly	Constituencies	See also
Koshi province	Koshi Provincial Assembly	56	List of provincial constituencies of Province No. 1
Madhesh Province	Madhesh Provincial Assembly	64	List of provincial constituencies of Madhesh
Bagmati Province	Bagmati Provincial Assembly	66	List of provincial constituencies of Bagmati
Gandaki Province	Gandaki Provincial Assembly	36	List of provincial constituencies of Gandaki
Lumbini Province	Lumbini Provincial Assembly	52	List of provincial constituencies of Lumbini
Karnali Province	Karnali Provincial Assembly	24	List of provincial constituencies of Karnali
Sudurpashchim Province	Sudurpashchim Provincial Assembly	32	List of provincial constituencies of Sudurpashchim

=== Koshi Province ===
District	Parliamentary	Provincial
Bhojpur	1	2
Dhankuta	1	2
Ilam	2	4
Jhapa	5	10
Khotang	1	2
Morang	6	12
Okhaldhunga	1	2
Panchthar	1	2
Sankhuwasabha	1	2
Solukhumbu	1	2
Sunsari	4	8
Taplejung	1	2
Udayapur	2	4
Terhathum	1	2

=== Madhesh Province ===
District	Parliamentary	Provincial
Bara	4	8
Dhanusha	4	8
Mahottari	4	8
Parsa	4	8
Rautahat	4	8
Saptari	4	8
Sarlahi	4	8
Siraha	4	8

=== Bagmati Province ===
District	Parliamentary	Provincial
Bhaktapur	2	4
Chitwan	3	6
Dhading	2	4
Dolakha	1	2
Kathmandu	10	20
Kavrepalanchok	2	4
Lalitpur	3	6
Makwanpur	2	4
Nuwakot	2	4
Ramechhap	1	2
Rasuwa	1	2
Sindhuli	2	4
Sindhupalchok	2	4

=== Gandaki Province ===
District	Parliamentary	Provincial
Baglung	2	4
Gorkha	2	4
Kaski	3	6
Lamjung	1	2
Manang	1	2
Mustang	1	2
Myagdi	1	2
Nawalparasi East	2	4
Parbat	1	2
Syangja	2	4
Tanahun	2	4

=== Lumbini Province ===
District	Parliamentary	Provincial
Arghakhanchi	1	2
Banke	3	6
Bardiya	2	4
Dang	3	6
Gulmi	2	4
Kapilvastu	3	6
Nawalparasi West	2	4
Palpa	2	4
Pyuthan	1	2
Rolpa	1	2
Rukum East	1	2
Rupandehi	5	10

=== Karnali Province ===
District	Parliamentary	Provincial
Dailekh	2	4
Dolpa	1	2
Humla	1	2
Jajarkot	1	2
Jumla	1	2
Kalikot	1	2
Mugu	1	2
Rukum West	1	2
Salyan	1	2
Surkhet	2	4

=== Sudurpashchim Province ===
District	Parliamentary	Provincial
Achham	2	4
Baitadi	1	2
Bajhang	1	2
Bajura	1	2
Dadeldhura	1	2
Darchula	1	2
Doti	1	2
Kailali	5	10
Kanchanpur	3	6

== See also ==
- Lists of electoral districts by nation
