= Balram Baskota =

Nepali politician

Balram Prasad Baskota

Personal details
- Party: Communist Party of Nepal (Unified Marxist–Leninist) (until 2018); Nepal Communist Party (from 2018)

Balram Prasad Baskota is a Nepalese communist politician and member of the National Assembly. In 2018 he was elected in Bagmati Province for the Communist Party of Nepal (Unified Marxist–Leninist) with a two-year term.
