= Dwarika Devi Thakurani =

First Nepali woman parliamentarian and minister (1915–2002)

- द्वारिकादेवी ठकुरानी
- Born: Dwarika Devi Pant; 28 October 1915; Silgadhi, Doti, Kingdom of Nepal
- Died: 10 December 2002 (aged 87); Kailali, Nepal
- Occupation: Politician
- Known for: First woman Member of Parliament of Nepal; First woman Cabinet Minister of Nepal
- Spouse: Uddhav Bahadur Chand
- Parents: Bam Dev Pant (father); Radha Devi Pant (mother)
- Relatives: Shiva Raj Pant (step–brother)

Dwarika Devi Thakurani (Nepali: द्वारिकादेवी ठकुरानी; 28 October 1915 – 10 December 2002) was a Nepali politician, the first Nepali woman to be elected to parliament and the first woman to become a cabinet minister.

== Background ==
Thakurani was born to father Bam Dev Pant and mother Radha Devi Panta on 28 November 1915 (12 Kartik 1972 BS) in Silgadhi town of Doti district in far–western region of Nepal. She died on 10 December 2002 (14 Mangsir 2059 BS).

== Career ==
Thakurani was elected to parliament in the first democratic election of Nepal, held in February 1959. She was a candidate from Constituency No. 66, Dadeldhura District for Nepali Congress. She was the only woman elected to the House of Representatives (out of 15 that ran), and jointly the first woman in the Nepalese parliament, alongside Kamal Rana, who had been appointed to the Senate.

Following the election, she was also appointed deputy minister of Health and Local Self-governance on 27 May 1959 in the BP Koirala cabinet, also becoming the first female minister in Nepal.
