= Parliament House, Singha Durbar =

Seat of the Parliament of Nepal

Parliament House
- संसद भवन

General information
- Status: Under construction
- Location: Singha Durbar, Kathmandu, Nepal
- Coordinates: 27°41′56.7″N 85°19′34.4″E
- Construction started: 18 September 2019
- Owner: Government of Nepal

Other information
- Seating capacity: 1340

Parliament House (Nepali: संसद भवन) is the seat of the Parliament of Nepal, located in Kathmandu. It houses the House of Representatives and the National Assembly, which are the lower and upper house respectively in Nepal's bicameral parliament. It is located in Putali Bagaincha within the Singha Durbar complex, the principal administrative centre of the Government of Nepal, which also houses the Office of the Prime Minister and Council of Ministers, as well as various ministries and government departments.

Even though construction of the new building is not yet complete, meetings of the lower House is being held within the partially completed complex after previous meeting place, the International Convention Centre, was destroyed during 2025 Gen Z protests.

The newly elected Pratinidhi Sabha members took the oath on March 26, 2026, in this parliament house.

== See also ==
- Federal Parliament of Nepal
- Singha Durbar
