= Lila Kumari Bhandari =

Nepali politician

- लीला कुमारी भण्डारी

Deputy Chairperson of the National Assembly
- Incumbent
- Assumed office 7 April 2026
- President: Ram Chandra Paudel
- Vice President: Ram Sahaya Yadav
- Chairperson: Narayan Prasad Dahal
- Preceded by: Bimala Ghimire

Member of Parliament, National Assembly
- Incumbent
- Assumed office 9 March 2026
- Constituency: Sudurpashchim Province

Personal details
- Born: 14 September 1976 (age 49) Dhangadi,Kailali
- Party: Communist Party of Nepal (Maoist), Communist Party of Nepal (Unified Marxist–Leninist)

Lila Kumari Bhandari (Nepali: लीला कुमारी भण्डारी; born 14 September 1976) is a Nepalese politician, belonging to the Communist Party of Nepal (Unified Marxist–Leninist) . In the 2008 Constituent Assembly election she was elected from the Kailali-6 constituency belonging to Communist Party of Nepal (Maoist Centre) , winning 14826 votes.

She is currently serving as the Vice Chairperson of National Assembly since 7 April 2026.
