= Kamal Rana =

Nepalese politician (1928–2026)

Member of the Maha Sabha
- In office 1959–1960

Personal details
- Born: 1928 Tansen, Nepal
- Died: 19 February 2026 (aged 98) Kathmandu, Nepal

Kamal Rana (Nepali: कमल राना; 1928 – 19 February 2026) was a Nepalese politician. She was appointed to the Maha Sabha in 1959, becoming its first female member. Rana and Dwarika Devi Thakurani, who had been elected to the House of Representatives were the first women in the Nepalese parliament.

== Life and career ==
Rana was born in Tansen in 1928, the daughter of Raja Tarak Bahadur Shah and Dibyashori Shah; her brother Rishikesh Shah also became a politician. Related to the royal family, she married Meen Shumsher J.B. Rana, an army general. Their son Anoop Shumsher Rana later founded Necon Air. Rana earned a master's degree in political science at Tribhuvan University. She established the Women's Volunteer Services in 1952, and in the same year was appointed vice-chair of the National Assembly. She later served in the Advisory Assembly from 1958 to 1959.

Following the introduction of the 1959 constitution, a bicameral parliament was created with an elected House of Representatives and an appointed Maha Sabha (Senate). In the 1959 elections one woman – Dwarika Devi Thakurani – was elected, while Rana was the sole woman appointed to the new Maha Sabha by King Mahendra. In July 1959 she was elected chair of the Maha Sabha. In 1962 she was a delegate to the United Nations General Assembly and between 1963 and 1965 sat on the United Nations Commission on the Status of Women. She also served in the Rastriya Panchayat, was a founder member of the Nepal Red Cross Society in 1963 and was chair of the Nepal Family Planning Association.

Following the 1980 referendum on the system of government, she was appointed to the eleven-member Constitution Reform Recommendation Commission by King Birendra.

Rana died on 19 February 2026, at the age of 98.
