= Shashikala Dahal =

Nepali politician

- शशिकला दाहाल

Deputy Chairperson of the National Assembly
- In office 2018–2022

Personal details
- Born: May 28, 1957 (age 69) Bardibas, Mahottari
- Party: Communist Party of Nepal (Maoist Centre) (until 2018); Nepal Communist Party (from 2018)

Shashikala Dahal (Nepali: शशिकला दाहाल) is a Nepalese communist politician and former Deputy Chairperson of the Rastriya Sabha. In 2018, she was elected unopposed in Province No. 2 for the Communist Party of Nepal (Maoist Centre) with a four-year term.
