= Hora Prasad Joshi =

Nepalese politician (1925–2010)

- Born: 1925; Kathmandu, Nepal
- Died: November 23, 2010 (aged 85); Kathmandu, Nepal
- Education: Durbar High School
- Occupations: Lawyer; politician
- Political party: Nepali Congress
- Children: 4

Hora Prasad Joshi (Nepali: होराप्रसाद जोशी; 1925-2010) was a Nepali political figure who was crucial in shaping the politics of modern Nepali government. He was the Home Minister in B.P. Koirala's Nepali Congress, a social democratic political party. He also drafted the 1962 constitution for King Mahendra. He was also the Member Secretary of the National Health and Sports Council in 1958, and received a letter of felicitation for his contribution to Nepal's sports sector in 2002.

Hora Prasad Joshi wrote a book in 1958 called The Way to Political Stability: An Analysis discussing Nepal's tense political situation.

In 2006, a biography was written about his life and his role in Nepali politics. The biography, entitled Nabirsane ti dinaharu (नबिर्सने ती दिनहरु, translation: Those Days Which Cannot Be Forgotten), is available through the Library of Congress.
