= Narayan Prasad Dahal =

Napalese politician

The Right Honourable Narayan Prasad Dahal
- नारायणप्रसाद दाहाल

Chairperson of the National Assembly
- Incumbent
- Assumed office 12 March 2024
- President: Ram Chandra Paudel
- Vice Chairperson: Urmila Aryal; Bimala Ghimire; Lila Kumari Bhandari
- Preceded by: Ganesh Prasad Timilsina

Member of Parliament, National Assembly
- Incumbent
- Assumed office 12 April 2022
- Nominated by: Council of Ministers
- Appointed by: President
- Preceded by: Ram Narayan Bidari

Member of the Constituent Assembly
- In office 27 May 2008 – 28 May 2012
- Preceded by: Gangadhar Lamsal
- Succeeded by: Krishna Bhakta Pokhrel
- Constituency: Chitwan 3

Personal details
- Born: 24 February 1956 (age 70) Dhikurpokhari, Nepal
- Other political affiliations: Communist Party of Nepal (Maoist Centre)
- Spouse: Durga Devi Dahal
- Children: 3
- Relatives: Pushpa Kamal Dahal (brother)
- Education: Tribhuvan University

Narayan Prasad Dahal (Nepali: नारायणप्रसाद दाहाल; born 24 February 1956) is a Nepalese politician. He is a member of the Communist Party (Maoist Centre).

He has served as Chairperson of the National Assembly since 12 March 2024.
