= Provincial assemblies of Nepal =

Legislative assembly of a province in Nepal

The Provincial Assembly (Nepali: प्रदेश सभा; Pradesh Sabha) is the unicameral legislative assembly for a federal province of Nepal.

According to Article 176 of the Constitution of Nepal 2015, following the dissolution of the provincial assembly all the members forming the Provincial Assembly are elected. The term for the Provincial Assembly is five years, except when dissolved earlier.

Candidates for each constituency are chosen by the political parties or stand as independents. Each constituency elects one member under the first-past-the-post system of election. Since Nepal uses a parallel voting system, voters cast another ballot to elect members through the party-list proportional representation. The current constitution specifies that 60 percent of the members should be elected from the first-past-the-post system and 40 percent through the party-list proportional representation system. Women should account for one-third of the total members elected from each party and if one-third percentage are not elected, the party that fails to ensure so shall have to elect one-third of the total number as women through the party-list proportional representation.

A party with an overall majority (more seats than all other parties combined) following an election forms the government. If a party has no outright majority, parties can seek to form coalitions.

The first provincial assembly elections in Nepal were held in two phases, on 26 November 2017 and on 7 December 2017.

There are 550 provincial seats in all of the seven provinces of Nepal, in which 330 (60%) of the provincial seats will be elected through first-past-the-post voting and 220 (40%) of seats will be elected through proportional representation.

== List of provincial assemblies ==
Assembly	House strength			Seat	Current house
Assembly	FPTP Seats	PR Seats	Total seats	Seat	Current house
Koshi Province	56	37	93	Biratnagar	2nd
Madhesh Province	64	43	107	Janakpur	2nd
Bagmati Province	66	44	110	Hetauda	2nd
Gandaki Province	36	24	60	Pokhara	2nd
Lumbini Province	52	35	87	Deukhuri	2nd
Karnali Province	24	16	40	Birendranagar	2nd
Sudurpashchim Province	32	21	53	Godawari	2nd
Total	330	220	550	—	—

=== Seat distribution ===
Provincial Assembly	Total seats	Seats												
Provincial Assembly	Total seats	NC	UML	NCP	PSP-N	RPP	JP	PSP	NMKP	HNP	RJM	NFSP	PLP	Ind
Koshi	93	29	40	17	1	6								
Madhesh	107	22	25	17	28	1	13					1		
Bagmati	110	37	27	28		13			3	2				
Gandaki	60	27	22	7		2							1	1
Lumbini	87	27	29	16	4	4	3	2			1			1
Karnali	40	15	10	13		1							1	
Sudurpashchim	53	18	11	22		1								1
Total	550	175	164	121	33	28	16	2	3	2	1	1	2	3

== Koshi Provincial Assembly ==
As per the Constituency Delimitation Commission report, Koshi Province has 56 provincial seats under the FPTP (first-past-the-post) across 14 districts.

Districts	Constituencies
Taplejung District	2
Panchthar District	2
Ilam District	4
Jhapa District	10
Morang District	12
Sunsari District	8
Dhankuta District	2
Sankhuwasabha District	2
Bhojpur District	2
Tehrathum District	2
Okhaldhunga District	2
Khotang District	2
Solukhumbu District	2
Udayapur District	4

== Madhesh Provincial Assembly ==
Each district of Madhesh province has 8 provincial assembly seats, totalling to 64 seats under FPTP.

Districts	Constituencies
Saptari District	8
Siraha District	8
Dhanusha District	8
Mahottari District	8
Sarlahi District	8
Rautahat District	8
Bara District	8
Parsa District	8

== Bagmati Provincial Assembly ==
Bagmati has 66 provincial assembly seats under FPTP.

Districts	Constituencies
Sindhuli District	4
Ramechhap District	2
Dolakha District	2
Sindhupalchok District	4
Kavrepalanchok District	4
Lalitpur District	6
Bhaktapur District	4
Kathmandu District	20
Nuwakot District	4
Rasuwa District	2
Dhading District	4
Makwanpur District	4
Chitwan District	6

== Gandaki Provincial Assembly ==
Gandaki has 36 provincial assembly seats under FPTP.

Districts	Constituencies
Gorkha District	4
Lamjung District	2
Tanahu District	4
Syangja District	4
Kaski District	6
Manang District	2
Mustang District	2
Parbat District	2
Myagdi District	2
Baglung District	4
Nawalpur District	4

== Lumbini Provincial Assembly ==
Lumbini has 52 provincial assembly seats under FPTP.

Districts	Constituencies
Gulmi District	4
Palpa District	4
Rupandehi District	10
Arghakhanchi District	2
Kapilvastu District	6
Pyuthan District	2
Rolpa District	2
Dang District	6
Bardiya District	4
Banke District	6
Parasi District	4
Eastern Rukum District	2

== Karnali Provincial Assembly ==
Karnali has 24 provincial assembly seats under FPTP.

Districts	Constituencies
Salyan District	2
Surkhet District	4
Dailekh District	4
Jajarkot District	2
Dolpa District	2
Humla District	2
Kalikot District	2
Mugu District	2
Jumla District	2
Western Rukum District	2

== Sudurpashchim Provincial Assembly ==
Sudurpashchim has 32 provincial assembly seats under FPTP.

Districts	Constituencies
Bajura District	2
Bajhang District	2
Achham District	4
Doti District	2
Kailali District	10
Kanchanpur District	6
Dadeldhura District	2
Baitadi District	2
Darchula District	2
