= Singha Durbar =

Palace in Kathmandu, Nepal

- सिंहदरबार
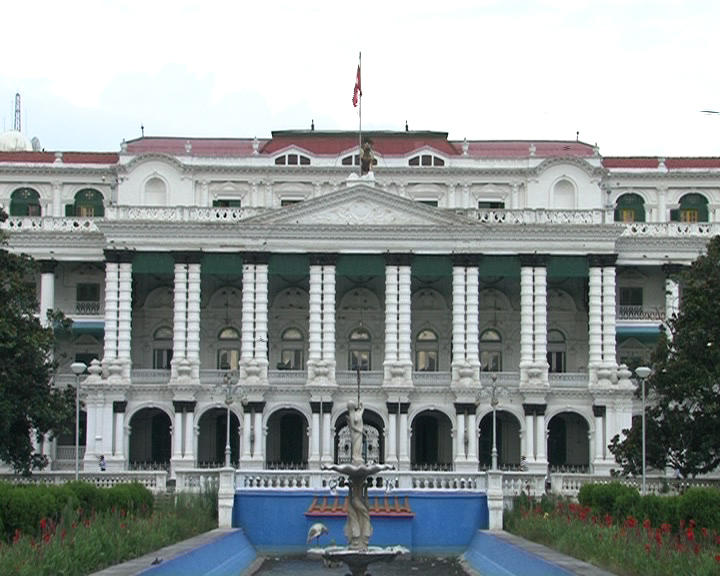
- Singha Durbar

General information
- Status: Partially damaged (fire primarily affected the ministers' offices and the Prime Minister's Office)
- Architectural style: Neoclassical architecture, Palladian architecture, and European styles of architecture
- Location: Kathmandu, Nepal
- Coordinates: 27.698°N 85.324°E
- Cost: Unknown
- Client: Chandra Shumsher Jung Bahadur Rana
- Owner: Government of Nepal

Technical details
- Structural system: Brick and Mortar

Design and construction
- Architects: Kumar Narsingh Rana, Kishor Narsingh Rana

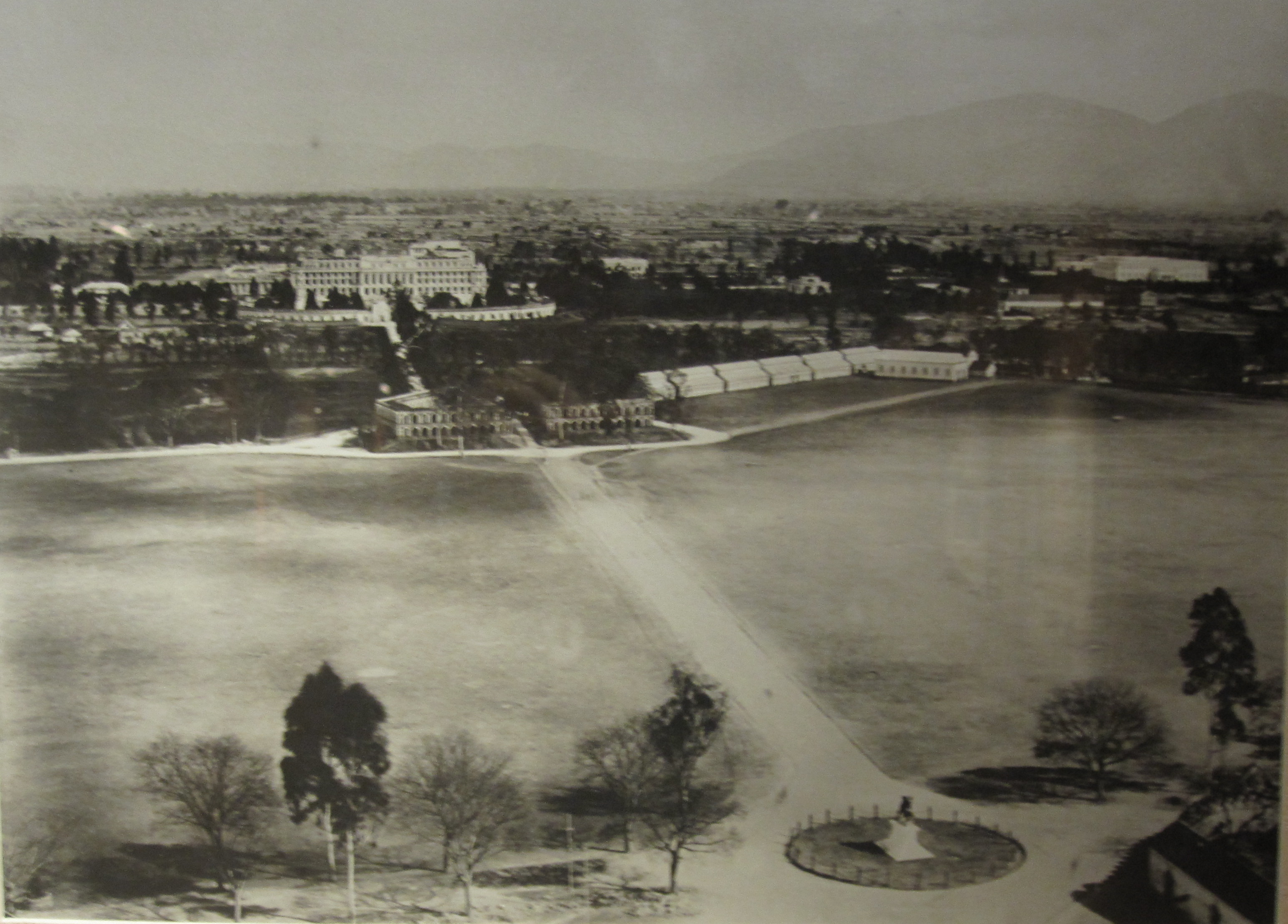
Aerial shot of Tundikhel along with Singha Durbar in 1920

Singha Durbar (Nepali: सिंहदरबार, lit. 'Lion's Palace') is a palace in Kathmandu, the capital of Nepal. The palace complex lies in the centre of Kathmandu, to the north of Babar Mahal and Thapathali Durbar and east of Bhadrakali Temple. This palace was built by Chandra Shumsher Jung Bahadur Rana in June 1908. It houses administrative offices of the Government of Nepal, including the Federal Parliament and several government ministries. In 2025, the main building was destroyed in the Gen Z protests, along with the prime minister's office. After Singha Durbar sustained damage during the Gen Z Protest Nepal movement, public discussions have emerged regarding its reconstruction and restoration.

== History ==
Singha Durbar was built by Chandra Shumsher Jung Bahadur Rana immediately after his accession to the post of Prime Minister. It was initially a small private residence but grew bigger during construction. Immediately after construction, Chandra Shumsher JBR sold this property to the Government of Nepal for 20 million Nepali rupees as the official residence of the Prime Minister. After his death in 1929, it was used as the official residence of prime ministers of the Rana dynasty except Padma Shumsher JBR, who lived in his own Bishalnagar Durbar. The last Rana Prime Minister to occupy Singha Durbar was Mohan Shumsher JBR. Even after the fall of the Rana dynasty in 1951, Mohan used this place, but in 1953 he was ordered by His Majesty's Government to leave the palace which became National Property.

=== Under Government of Nepal ===
After the end of the hereditary Prime Ministerial system of the Ranas in 1951, the Government of Nepal used this palace compound to house government offices. The palace compound is occupied by both chambers of the Parliament of Nepal (the Pratinidhi Sabha, or House of Representatives, and the Rashtriya Sabha, or House of the States). It holds 20 ministries and government offices. Singh Durbar is also the headquarters of Radio Nepal and Nepal Television.

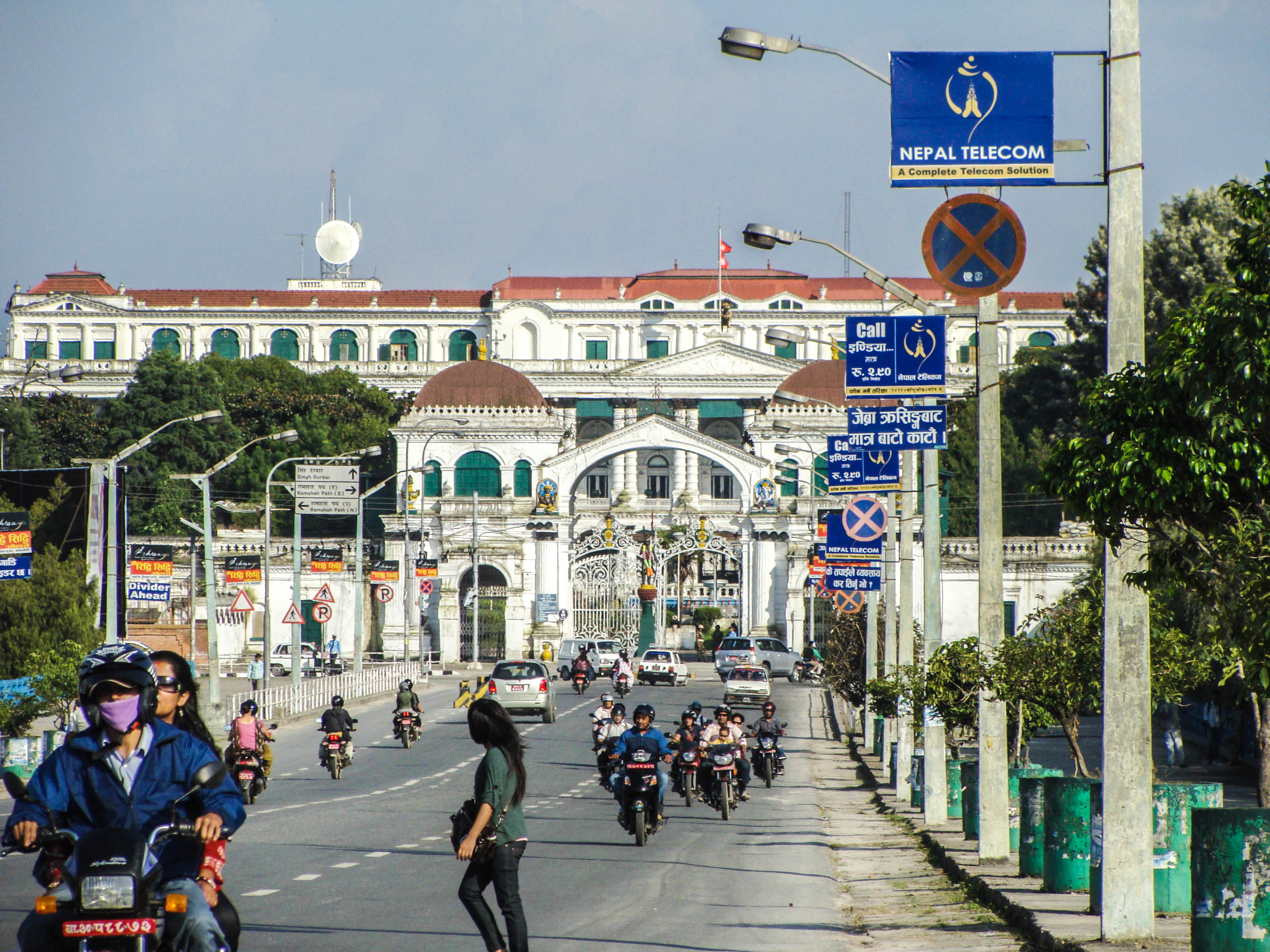
Singha Durbar

== Design ==
=== Exterior structure ===
The Western Gate (Main Gate) of Singha Durbar is the most historically significant, recognizable, and architecturally striking gateway of the entire government complex.

The structure was designed by Kumar Narsingh Rana, Kishor Narsingh Rana. The architecture of the palace is a unique example of merging building traditions, including Palladian, Corinthian, Neoclassical mansions along with Baroque architecture.

=== Interior space ===
Before the fire of 1973, Singha Durbar had 8 courtyards and 1700 rooms with marbled floor, painted ceilings, silver furniture and expanses of crystal lighting.

=== State Hall ===
The State Hall is the largest and the most decorated room in this palace. This hall is adorned with foreign imported art pieces like Murano glass crystal chandeliers, Belgian mirrors along with English stained glass doors and Italian marble floors with floral patterns in walls and ceilings.

=== Gallery Baithak ===
Juddha Shumsher Jung Bahadur Rana built Gallery Baithak to meet foreign dignitaries. During that time, ambassadors from friendly countries used to present their credence at the Hanuman Dhoka. Later the Gallery Baithak was used as the parliament building.

== Disasters ==
=== Fire of 1973 ===
On Monday, 9 July 1973, a huge fire broke out in Singha Durbar engulfing all three wings of the palace except the front facing wing. To prevent the front wing from catching fire, cannons destroyed three wings facing North, South and West. After the fire was put out, the whole area was rebuilt on the old foundation.

=== Earthquake of 2015 ===
Singha Durbar was seriously damaged during the April 2015 Nepal earthquake.

=== Fire of 2025 ===
On 9 September 2025, the building was set on fire during the anti-corruption Gen Z protests. The incident occurred alongside attacks on other government buildings as well as the private residence of Nepali Prime Minister K. P. Sharma Oli.

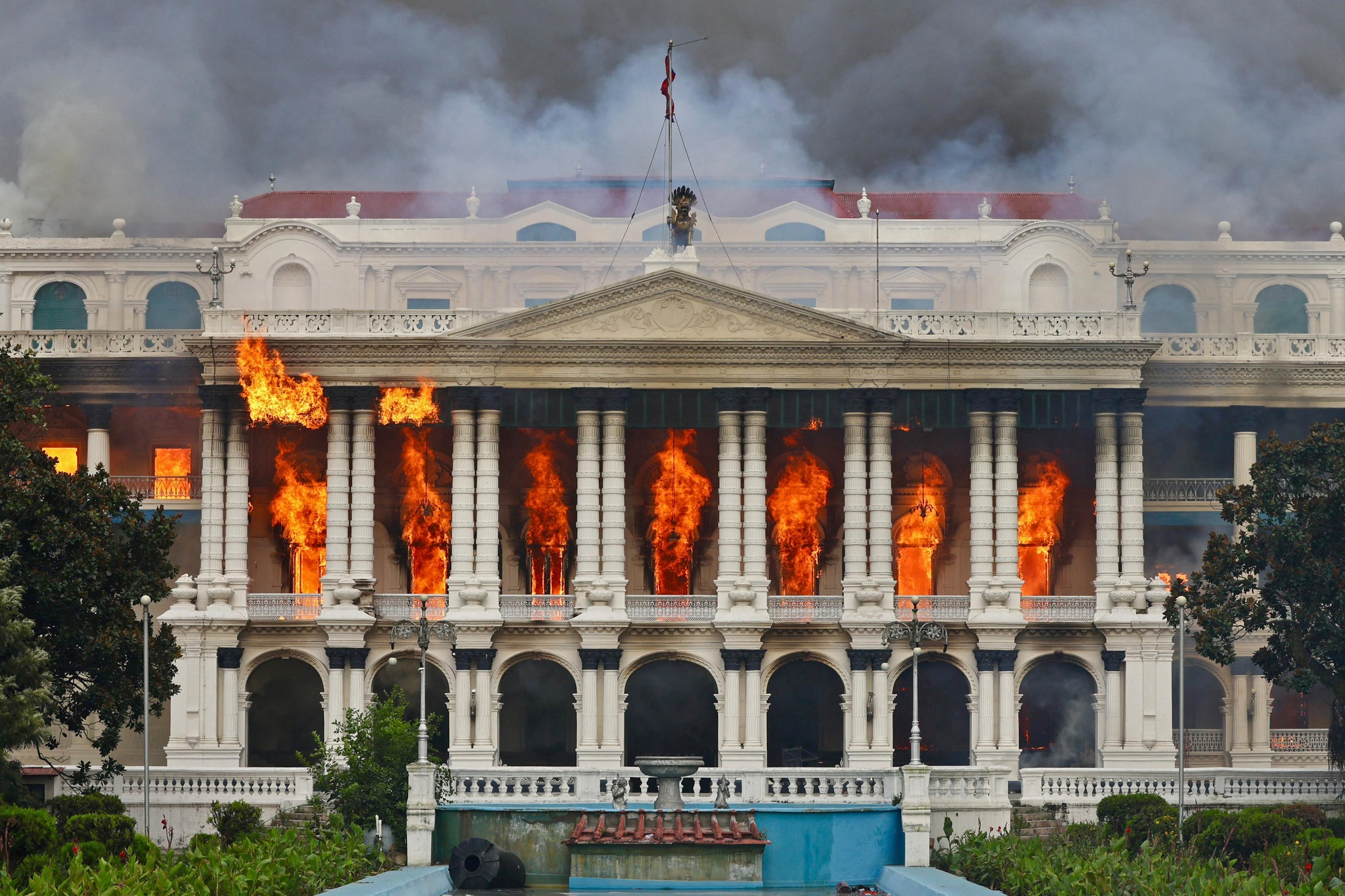
Fire set by protesters at Singha Durbar, 2025

== Singha Durbar Premises ==
=== Parliament Building ===
The new Parliament house is being constructed in Putali Bagaicha within Singha Durbar. On one side of building is House of Representatives hall and on the other side is the National Assembly hall.

== Singha Durbar Plaza ==
Singha Durbar Plaza refers to the central area surrounding Singha Durbar, a historic palace complex that now serves as the administrative hub of Nepal. Located in the heart of Kathmandu, it is bordered by Babar Mahal, Bhadrakali Temple, and Thapathali Durbar, making it a strategic and symbolic location. Located within Singha Durbar Plaza are the headquarters of several prominent institutions such as the Nepal Telecom, Nepal Stock Exchange, Rastriya Banijya Bank, Agriculture Development Bank, and various governmental bodies. Singhadurbar Plaza is now called Bhadrakali Plaza.

== See also ==
- Babar Mahal
- Thapathali Durbar
- Rana palaces of Nepal
