= 2020 Nepalese National Assembly election =

- 23 January 2020

18 seats to the National Assembly

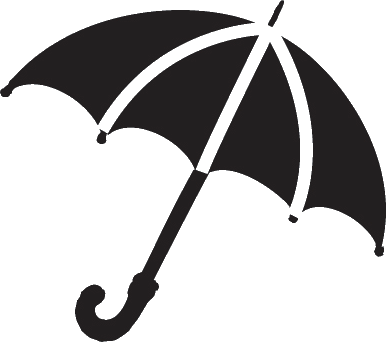

	First party	Second party
		BJP Election Symbol
Party	NCP	Congress
Seats before	39	13
Seats after	47	6
Seat change	▲8	▼7
	Third party	Fourth party
Party	RJPN	Samajbadi Party
Seats before	2	2
Seats after	2	1
Seat change	Steady	▼1
Chairperson of the National Assembly before election
Ganesh Prasad Timilsina
CPN (UML)
Elected Chairperson of the National Assembly
Ganesh Prasad Timilsina
CPN (UML)

National Assembly elections were held in Nepal on 23 January 2020 across all seven provinces to elect the 18 of the 19 retiring members of the National Assembly. According to Article 86 of the Constitution of Nepal 2015, one third of the members of the National Assembly are elected every two years through an electoral college. Following the full implementation of the house in 2018, one-third of the members chosen by drawing a lottery retired after only two years.

== Electoral college ==
The electoral college consists of members of the provincial assembly and Chairperson/Mayor and Vice Chairperson/Deputy Mayor of the local bodies within the state. Each provincial assembly members vote has a weight of forty eight whereas each Chairperson/Mayor/Vice Chairperson/Deputy Mayor vote has a weight of eighteen. The electoral college elects 56 members to the National Assembly and three members, including one woman, are nominated by the president on the recommendation of the Government of Nepal.

== Alliance ==
=== Nepal Communist Party+ ===
No.	Party	Flag	Symbol	Leader	Photo	Seats Contested	Reference
1.	Nepal Communist Party			Prachanda		16	
2.	Rastriya Janata Party Nepal			Mahantha Thakur		2	

=== Nepali Congress+ ===
No.	Party	Flag	Symbol	Leader	Photo	Seats Contested	Reference
1.	Nepali Congress			Sher Bahadur Deuba		16	
2.	Samajbadi Party, Nepal			Upendra Yadav		2	

== Results ==
Party	Seats				
Party	Total in 2018	Up	Won	Total	+/–
Nepal Communist Party	39	8	16	47	+8
Nepali Congress	13	7	0	6	–7
Rastriya Janata Party Nepal	2	2	2	2	0
Samajbadi Party	2	1	0	1	–1
Nominated	3	1	1	3	0
Total	40	19	19	59	0
Source: Republica

=== Province No. 1 ===
Previous MP	Previous Party	Elected MP	Elected Party	Category	Votes
Sarita Prasai	Nepali Congress	Indira Gautam	Nepal Communist Party	Women	6,426
Khem Raj Nepali	Nepal Communist Party	Gopi Alchhami	Nepal Communist Party	Dalit	6,330
Haricharan Shiwakoti	Nepal Communist Party	Devendra Dahal	Nepal Communist Party	Open	6,234
Source: Nepal Gazette

=== Province No. 2 ===
Previous MP	Previous Party	Elected MP	Elected Party	Category	Votes
Mukta Kumari Yadav	Nepali Congress	Tulsa Dahal	Nepal Communist Party	Women	5,208
Ramprit Paswan	Samajbadi Party, Nepal	Radheshyam Paswan	Nepal Communist Party	Dalit	5,292
Ramesh Prasad Yadav	Rastriya Janata Party Nepal	Mrigendra Singh Yadav	Rastriya Janata Party Nepal	Open	5,400
Brijesh Chandra Lal	Rastriya Janata Party Nepal	Shekhar Singh	Rastriya Janata Party Nepal	Disabled and Minority	5,502
Source: Nepal Gazette

=== Bagmati Pradesh ===
Previous MP	Previous Party	Elected MP	Elected Party	Category	Votes
Balram Baskota	Nepal Communist Party	Beduram Bhushal	Nepal Communist Party	Open	6,810
Dhana Khatiwada	Nepali Congress	Ganga Belbase	Nepal Communist Party	Women	6,828
Source: Nepal Gazette

=== Gandaki Pradesh ===
Previous MP	Previous Party	Elected MP	Elected Party	Category	Votes
Brinda Rana Magar	Nepali Congress	Bhagwati Neupane	Nepal Communist Party	Women	3,366
Surendra Raj Pandey	Nepali Congress	Narayan Kaji Shrestha	Nepal Communist Party	Open	3,462
Source: Nepal Gazette

=== Province No. 5 ===
Previous MP	Previous Party	Elected MP	Elected Party	Category	Votes
Durga Prasad Upadhyaya	Nepali Congress	Gopal Bhattarai	Nepal Communist Party	Open	5,382
Mina Budha	Nepal Communist Party	Bimala Ghimire	Nepal Communist Party	Women	5,778
Raj Kumar Kunwar	Nepal Communist Party	Jag Prasad Sharma	Nepal Communist Party	Disabled and Minority	5,424
Source: Nepal Gazette

=== Karnali Pradesh ===
Previous MP	Previous Party	Elected MP	Elected Party	Category	Votes
Kali Bahadur Malla	Nepal Communist Party	Maya Prasad Acharya	Nepal Communist Party	Open	3,618
Yutul Lama	Nepal Communist Party	Sumitra BC	Nepal Communist Party	Women	3,684
Source: Nepal Gazette

=== Sudurpaschim Pradesh ===
Previous MP	Previous Party	Elected MP	Elected Party	Category	Votes
Badri Prasad Pandey	Nepali Congress	Taraman Swar	Nepal Communist Party	Open	3,720
Kamala Kumari Oli	Nepal Communist Party	Sharada Bhatta	Nepal Communist Party	Women	3,738
Source: Nepal Gazette
