= Federal Parliament of Nepal =

Federal legislature of Nepal

Federal Parliament of Nepal संघीय संसद नेपाल
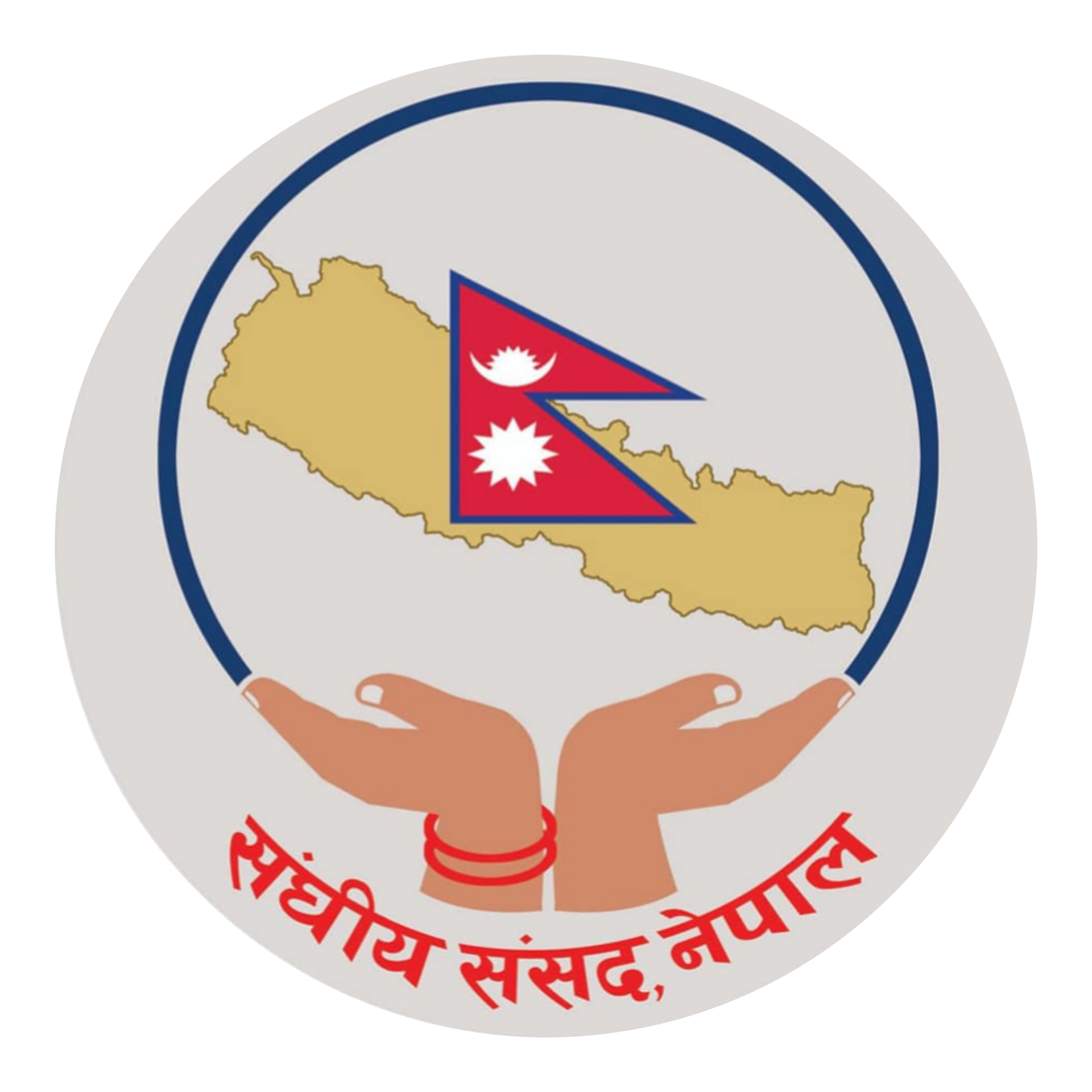
- Emblem of Federal Parliament of Nepal

Type
- Type: Bicameral
- Houses: National Assembly (upper house); House of Representatives (lower house)

History
- Founded: 5 March 2018 (8 years ago)
- Preceded by: 2nd Constituent Assembly

Leadership
- President: Ram Chandra Paudel since 13 March 2023
- Vice President: Ram Sahaya Yadav since 20 March 2023
- Chairperson of the National Assembly: Narayan Prasad Dahal, NCP since 12 March 2024
- Deputy Chairperson of the National Assembly: Lila Kumari Bhandari, CPN (UML) since 7 April 2026
- Speaker of the House of Representatives: Dol Prasad Aryal, RSP since 5 April 2026
- Deputy Speaker of the House of Representatives: Ruby Kumari Thakur, SSP since 10 April 2026
- Prime Minister: Balendra Shah, RSP since 27 March 2026
- Leader of the Opposition: Bhishma Raj Angdembe, Nepali Congress since 27 April 2026

Structure
- Seats: 334 MPs; 59 (National Assembly); 275 (House of Representatives)
- National Assembly political groups: Congress (24); NCP (18) (Note: Including 1 nominated member); CPN (UML) (12); PSP-N (3); Janamorcha (1); Vacant (1)
- House of Representatives political groups: RSP (182); Congress (38); CPN (UML) (25); NCP (17); SSP (7); RPP (5); Independent (1)
- Length of term: National Assembly: 6 years (fixed except under double dissolution); House of Representatives: 5 years

Elections
- National Assembly voting system: Single transferable vote & First-past-the-post
- House of Representatives voting system: First-past-the-post & proportional representation
- Last National Assembly election: 25 January 2026
- Last House of Representatives election: 5 March 2026
- Next National Assembly election: 2028
- Next House of Representatives election: 2031

Meeting place
- Samsad Bhawan, Singhadurbar

Website
- www.parliament.gov.np

Constitution
- Constitution of Nepal

The Federal Parliament of Nepal (संघीय संसद नेपाल, Saṅghīya Sansada Nēpāla) is the bicameral federal and supreme legislature of Nepal established in 2018 (2074 BS). It consists of the National Assembly and the House of Representatives as parallel houses.

The upper house, the National Assembly (राष्ट्रिय सभा, Rastriya Sabha), consists of 59 members; eight for each province, regardless of population by an electoral college of each province, and three are appointed by the President on recommendation of the government. The lower house, the House of Representatives (प्रतिनिधि सभा, Pratinidhi Sabha) has 275 members. 165 members are elected from single-member constituencies by first-past-the-post voting and 110 elected through proportional electoral system where voters vote for political parties, considering the whole country as a single election constituency.

== History ==
=== Legislatures of Kingdom of Nepal ===
The former Parliament of Nepal was dissolved by King Gyanendra in 2002, on the grounds that it was incapable of handling the Maoist rebels. The country's five main political parties had staged protests against the king, arguing that he must either call fresh elections or reinstate the elected legislature. In 2004, the king announced that parliamentary elections would be held within twelve months; in April 2006, in response to major pro-democratic protests, it was announced that Parliament would be reestablished.

=== Interim Legislature of Nepal ===
After the success of the April 2006 people's movement on 15 January 2007 the old parliament was dissolved and replaced by a 330-member interim legislature of Nepal. The legislature drafted an interim constitution and a constituent assembly election was held in April 2008. The 601-member assembly on 28 May 2008 abolished the 238-year-old monarchy and declared the country a republic. The constituent assembly, which was initially given two years to draft a new constitution, was dissolved on 27 May 2012 after its failure to draft a new constitution due to differences over restructuring the state.

=== Legislature Parliament of Nepal ===
The second Nepalese Constituent Assembly was converted into a legislative parliament of Nepal after the promulgation of the constitution on 20 September 2015. The second Nepalese Constituent Assembly was formed after the failure of the first Constituent Assembly to draft a new constitution. The Legislature Parliament of Nepal was dissolved on 21 January 2018 (7 Magh 2074 BS).

== Parliament House ==
From the beginning of democracy in Nepal till 2008 all the legislative activities were held in the Gallery Baithak. However, the Parliament shifted to the ICC in New Baneshwar after the HoR members increased to 601 following the election of the Constituent Assembly.

Until September 2025, both houses of the federal parliament met at the International Convention Centre in New Baneshwor, Kathmandu. On 9 September 2025, anti-government demonstrators stormed the convention centre as part of the Gen Z protests. The building was vandalised and subsequently set alight. Demonstrators also stormed the nearby Singha Durbar government complex and razed the main building, which houses the offices of the prime minister and other government ministers.

Currently, meetings of the lower House are being held in the new Parliament House, which is still under construction, within the premises of the Singha Durbar complex, while meetings of the upper House are being held in different hall within the same complex.

== Composition ==
According to the Constitution of Nepal 2015, Nepal has a two-chamber parliament (संसद), consisting of the Pratinidhi Sabha and the Rastriya Sabha, with the President of Nepal acting as their head.

=== President of Nepal ===
The President of the Federal Democratic Republic of Nepal (नेपालको राष्ट्रपति, Nēpālakō rāṣṭrapati) is the head of state of Nepal and commander in chief of the Nepalese Armed Forces. The office was created in May 2008 after the country was declared as a republic. The first President of Nepal was Ram Baran Yadav. The current president is Ram Chandra Poudel. He is the third president of the country.

=== National Assembly ===
The National Assembly (राष्ट्रिय सभा, Rāṣṭriya Sabhā) has 59 members. Eight members are elected from each of the seven provinces by an electoral college of each province, and three are appointed by the President on recommendation of the government. They must include at least three women, one Dalit, and one member from disabled groups. Members serve staggered six year terms such that the term of one-third members expires every two years.

=== House of Representatives ===
The House of Representatives (प्रतिनिधि सभा, Pratinidhi Sabha) has 275 members. 165 members are elected from single-member constituencies by first-past-the-post voting and 110 elected through proportional electoral system where voters vote for political parties, considering the whole country as a single election constituency. The members of the house hold their seats for five years or until the house is dissolved by the President on the advice of the council of ministers.

== Parliamentary committees ==
There are 16 thematic committees in the federal parliament: ten in the House of Representatives, four in the National Assembly and two joint committees.

=== House of Representatives ===
- Finance
- International Relations and Tourism
- Industry, Commerce, Labour and Consumer Welfare
- Law, Justice and Human Rights
- Agriculture, Cooperative and Natural Resources
- Women And Social Affairs
- State Affairs and Good Governance
- Infrastructure Development
- Education, Health and Information Technology
- Public Account

=== National Assembly ===
- Development, Economic Affairs and Good Governance
- Legislation Management
- Public Policy and Delegated Legislation
- Federalism Enablement and National Concerns

=== Joint ===
- Parliamentary Hearing
- Monitoring and Evaluation of the Implementation of the Directive Principles, Policies and Obligations of the state

== Women's representation ==
The constitution of Nepal guarantees a 33% reservation for women in all public offices including the federal parliament. On 16 March 2018, Dr. Shiva Maya Tumbahamphe was elected as the deputy speaker of the house. Women's representation in the parliament has increased since the Constituent Assembly, which eventually guaranteed provisions for women's representation on the constitution.

== See also ==
- Politics of Nepal
- List of legislatures by country
