= National Assembly (Nepal) =

Upper house of Federal Parliament of Nepal

National Assembly राष्ट्रिय सभा
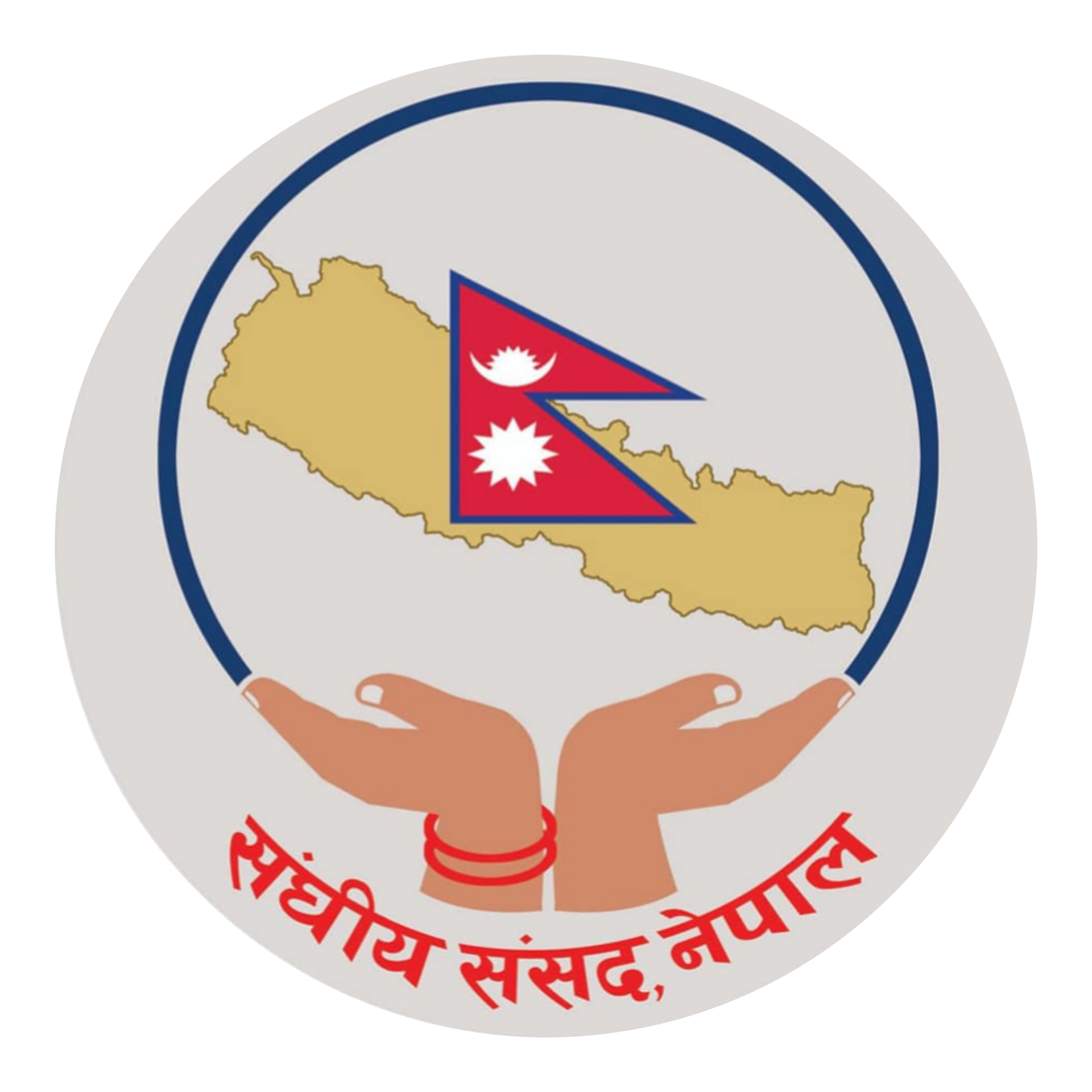
- Emblem of the National Assembly

Type
- Type: Upper house of the Federal Parliament of Nepal

Leadership
- Chairperson: Narayan Prasad Dahal, NCP since 12 March 2024
- Deputy Chairperson: Lila Kumari Bhandari, CPN (UML) since 6 April 2026

Structure
- Seats: 59
- Political groups: Government (0) Opposition (57): Nepali Congress (24); NCP (18) (Note: Including 1 nominated member.); CPN (UML) (11); PSP-N (3); Janamorcha (1); Vacant (2): Vacant (2)
- Committees: Parliamentary committees of Nepal
- Length of term: 6 years

Elections
- Voting system: Parallel voting: 42 seats – STV; 14 seats – FPTP; 3 seats - Nominated by the president
- First election: 1991
- Last election: 2026 (Class 1)
- Next election: 2028 (Class 2); 2030 (Class 3); 2032 (Class 1)

Meeting place
- Sansad Bhawan, Singhadurbar, Kathmandu, Nepal

Website
- na.parliament.gov.np/np

The National Assembly (Nepali: राष्ट्रिय सभा, romanized: Rāṣṭriya Sabhā) is the upper house of the Federal Parliament of Nepal, the lower house being the House of Representatives. The composition and powers of the Assembly are established by Part 8 and 9 of the Constitution of Nepal. There are a total of 59 members in the Assembly: 8 members are elected from each of the seven provinces by an electoral college of each province, and three are appointed by the President on the recommendation of the government. Members serve staggered six-year terms, with one-third rotating out every two years.

== History ==
The 1959 Constitution of Nepal established the Senate as the upper house of the first democratically elected parliament following the 1951 revolution. The parliament was inactive following the 1960 coup d'état and was replaced by the unicameral Rastriya Panchayat in 1962. After the 1990 revolution, the Constitution of 1990 replaced the Rastriya Panchayat with a bicameral parliament with the National Assembly as the upper house. The National Assembly under the 1990 Constitution was dissolved on 15 January 2007 and replaced by a unicameral Interim Legislature. Following two Constituent Assembly elections which also served as a unitary Legislature Parliament, the constitution, promulgated on 20 September 2015, provisioned for a National Assembly as the upper house of the federal parliament.

== Qualifications ==
The qualifications for being a member of National Assembly are laid out in Article 87 of the constitution and the National Assembly Member Election Act, 2017:

- must be a citizen of Nepal
- must be at least thirty-five years of age on date of nomination
- must have name listed on voter list
- should not have been convicted of a criminal offense involving moral turpitude
- must not be disqualified by any Federal law
- must not be holding any office of profit.

== Election procedure ==
Each of the seven provinces elects 8 members each and Government of Nepal nominates 3 members and recommends to the president for approval.

The electoral college consists of members of the provincial assembly and chairperson/mayor and vice-chairperson/deputy mayor of the local bodies within the province. Each provincial assembly member's vote has a weight of forty eight whereas each chairperson/mayor/vice-chairperson/deputy mayor's vote has a weight of eighteen.

Out of the eight members from each province, three must be women, one must be from the Dalit community, and one must be a disabled person or from a minority community. Each elector gets four ballots; one for the three open seats, one for the three female seats, one for the dalit seat and one for the disabled or minority seat. The three open and three female seats are filled by single transferable vote, the two other seats by FPTP.

The election is conducted by the Election Commission.

== Duties of National Assembly ==
The key function of the National Assembly is to review, revise, and pass the legislation passed by the House of Representatives. The lower house focuses on lawmaking, while the upper house helps revise and refine the legislation before it is passed.

== Composition ==
Party	Parliamentary party leader	Members
Nepali Congress	Kamala Panta	24
Nepali Communist Party	Beduram Bhusal	18
CPN (UML)	Devendra Dhaal	11
PSP-Nepal		3
Janamorcha		1
Vacant		2
Total		59

=== Seat distribution ===
Province	Seats held							
Province	Open			Women			Dalit	D/M
Koshi	NC	NC	NC	UML	NCP	UML	UML	UML
Madhesh	PSP-N	PSP-N	NC	UML	NCP	PSP-N	NC	NC
Bagmati	UML	NC	NC	NC	NCP	NC	NCP	NCP
Gandaki	NC	UML	NC	NCP	NC	NCP	NCP	NC
Lumbini	NC	NC	NCP	UML	NCP	NC	RJM	NC
Karnali	NC	NCP	NC	UML	NC	NCP	NCP	NCP
Sudurpashchim	NC	NC		UML	NCP	NCP	NCP	NC
Nominated		NCP	UML	—N/a				

== Officers of the National Assembly ==
=== Chairperson ===
The current chairperson of National Assembly is Narayan Prasad Dahal. He assumed office on 12 March 2024.

=== Deputy Chairperson ===
The current deputy chairperson of National Assembly is Lila Kumari Bhandari. She assumed office on 7 April 2026.

== Terms of the National Assembly ==
Elected in	Class	Seats	Start	End	Head of State
Parliament of the Kingdom of Nepal					Monarch
1991		50	26 June 1991	26 June 1993	Birendra of Nepal
1993	I	17	27 June 1993	25 June 1995	Birendra of Nepal
1995	II	16	13 November 1995	27 June 1997	Birendra of Nepal
1997	III	17	27 June 1997	27 June 1999	Birendra of Nepal
1999	I	17	10 July 1999	27 June 2001	Birendra of Nepal
2001	II	16	27 June 2001	26 June 2003	Gyanendra of Nepal
Federal Parliament of Nepal					President
2018	None		7 February 2018	3 March 2020	Bidya Devi Bhandari
2020	I	19	3 March 2020	3 March 2022	Bidya Devi Bhandari
2022	II	20	4 March 2022	3 March 2024	Bidya Devi Bhandari
2022	II	20	4 March 2022	3 March 2024	Ram Chandra Poudel
2024	III	20	4 March 2024	3 March 2026	Ram Chandra Poudel
2026	I	18	9 March 2026	Incumbent	Ram Chandra Poudel

== See also ==
- List of current members of the National Assebmly
- List of members of the National Assembly of Nepal
- Senate (Nepal)
