= List of members of the National Assembly (Nepal) =

This is a list of current and former members of the National Assembly.

== A ==
Member	Party	Region/Category	Date of appointment	Date of retirement	Terms
Janardan Acharya	Nominated	Sunsari	22 July 1997	26 June 2003	1
Mahesh Acharya	Nepali Congress	Open	26 June 1991	27 June 1997	1
Nar Hari Acharya	Nepali Congress	Open	26 June 1991	27 June 1997	1
Yagya Prasad Acharya	Nepali Congress	Western Region	27 June 1993	27 June 1999	1
Mohan Chandra Adhikari	CPN (UML)	Open	27 June 1993	27 June 1999	1
Kashi Nath Adhikari	CPN (UML)	Open	10 July 1999	2003	1
Radheshyam Adhikari	Nepali Congress	Open	27 June 2001	2003	2
Radheshyam Adhikari	Nepali Congress	Bagmati, Open	4 March 2018	3 March 2022	2
Shanti Adhikari	Nepal Communist Party; CPN (UML)	Gandaki, Women	4 March 2018	3 March 2022	1
Shri Krishna Adhikari	CPN (Maoist Centre)	Bagmati, Disability or Ethnic Minority	4 March 2024		1
Bishwanath Agrawal	Nepali Congress	Open	26 June 1991	27 June 1997	1
Dolendra Bahadur Amatya (Note: Member of the Mahasabha (Senate) which served as the upper house of the Parliament of the Kingdom of Nepal from 1959 to 1960)	Nepali Congress		10 July 1959	15 December 1960	1
Mohammad Ahmeddin	Nominated		13 July 1959	15 December 1960	1
Gopi Alchhami	Nepal Communist Party; CPN (Maoist Centre)	Province 1, Dalit	4 March 2020	3 March 2026	1
Suresh Ale Magar	CPN (Maoist Centre)	Gandaki, Open	4 March 2022		1
Prem Raj Angdembe	Nepali Congress	Open	26 June 1991	25 June 1995	1
Urmila Aryal	CPN (Maoist Centre)	Madhesh, Women	4 March 2022		1
Bhicchu Ashwaghosh	CPN (UML)	Open	26 June 1991	26 June 1993	1

== B ==
Member	Party	Region/Category	Date of appointment	Date of retirement	Terms
Mohan Bahadur Bam	CPN (UML)	Far-Western Region	28 June 1999	2003	1
Aagam Prasad Bantawa Rai	Nepal Communist Party; CPN (UML)	Province 1 Disability or Ethnic Minority	4 March 2018	3 March 2022	1
Balram Baskota	Nepal Communist Party; CPN (UML)	Bagmati, Open	4 March 2018	3 March 2020	1
Gopal Basnet	Nepali Congress	Province 1, Open	4 March 2022		1
Jit Jung Basnet	Nepali Congress	Koshi, Open	4 March 2024		1
Lalit Kumar Basnet	CPN (UML)	Central Region	27 June 2001	2003	1
Sumitra B.C.	Nepal Communist Party; CPN (UML)	Karnali, Women	4 March 2020	3 March 2026	1
Ganga Belbase	Nepal Communist Party; CPN (Maoist Centre)	Bagmati, Women	4 March 2020		1
Dhruba Ram Bhandari	Nepali Congress	Open	26 June 1991	26 June 1993	1
Lila Kumari Bhandari	CPN (UML)	Sudurpashchim, Women	9 March 2026		
Ramesh Nath Bhandari	Nominated	Kathmandu	27 June 1993	27 June 1999	1
Sunil Kumar Bhandari	Nepali Congress	Far-Western Region	27 June 1993	27 June 1999	1
Narayan Bhatta	Nepali Congress	Sudurpashchim, Disability or Ethnic Minority	4 March 2024		1
Basudev Bhatta	Nepali Congress	Far-Western Region	28 June 1995	27 June 2001	1
Hira Dutt Bhatta	Nepali Congress	Open	27 June 1993	27 June 1999	1
Rohini Dev Bhatta	Nepali Congress	Open	27 June 1993	27 June 1999	1
Sharada Bhatta	Nepal Communist Party; CPN (UML)	Sudurpashchim, Women	4 March 2020	3 March 2026	1
Udhhav Dev Bhatta	Nominated	Baitadi	26 June 1991	27 June 1997	1
Durga Kumari Bhattarai	Nepali Congress	Women	27 June 1993	27 June 1999	1
Gopal Bhattarai	Nepal Communist Party; CPN (UML)	Lumbini, Open	4 March 2020	3 March 2026	1
Khim Lal Bhattarai	Nepal Communist Party; CPN (UML)	Lumbini, Open	4 March 2018	10 October 2022	1
Ram Chandra Bhattarai	CPN (UML)	Western Region	28 June 1999	2003	1
Beduram Bhusal	CPN (UML)	Open	27 June 2001	2003	2
Beduram Bhusal	Nepal Communist Party; CPN (UML); CPN (Unified Socialist)	Bagmati, Open	4 March 2020	3 March 2026	2
Ram Narayan Bidari	Nepal Communist Party; CPN (Maoist Centre)	Nominated	10 March 2018	3 March 2022	1
Bijul Kumar Bishwakarma	Nepali Congress	Open	10 July 1999	26 June 2003	1
Lal Bahadur Bishwakarma	CPN (UML)	Open	10 July 1999	2003	1
Man Bahadur Bishwakarma	Nominated	Parbat	27 June 1993	27 June 1999	1
Ratna Bahadur Bishwakarma	Nepali Congress	Mid-Western Region	28 June 1995	27 June 2001	1
Singha Bahadur Bishwakarma	Nepal Communist Party; CPN (UML); CPN (Unified Socialist)	Bagmati, Dalit	4 March 2018	3 March 2024	1
Tul Prasad Bishwakarma	Rastriya Janamorcha	Lumbini, Dalit	4 March 2022		1
Akkal Bahadur Bista	Nepali Congress	Open	27 June 2001	2003	1
Keshar Bahadur Bista	Nepali Congress	Open	13 November 1995	12 March 1999	1
Nar Bahadur Bista	CPN (Maoist Centre)	Karnali, Disability or Ethnic Minority	4 March 2022		1
Bishnu BK	CPN (Maoist Centre)	Karnali, Dalit	4 March 2024		1
Khim Bahadur BK	Nepal Communist Party; CPN (Maoist Centre)	Gandaki, Dalit	4 March 2018	3 March 2022	1
Jagat Bahadur Bogati	CPN (UML); Independent	Open	26 June 1991	27 June 1999	2
Kabita Bogati	Nepal Communist Party; CPN (UML)	Karnali, Women	4 March 2018	3 March 2022	1
Baldev Bohara	Nepali Congress	Sudurpaschchim, Open	4 March 2024	14 January 2024	1
Udaya Bohara	CPN (Unified Socialist)	Karnali, Open	4 March 2022		
Prem Chaitanya Bramhachari	Nepali Congress		10 July 1959	15 December 1960	1
Mina Budha	Nepal Communist Party; CPN (UML)	Lumbini, Women	4 March 2018	3 March 2020	1
Jeevan Budha	Nepal Communist Party; CPN (Maoist Centre)	Karnali, Disability or Ethnic Minority	4 March 2018	3 March 2022	1

== C ==
Member	Party	Region/Category	Date of appointment	Date of retirement	Terms
Rabindra Chakrawarty	Nominated	Sunsari	27 June 1993	27 June 1999	1
Sundar Raj Chalise	Nepali Congress		10 July 1959	15 December 1960	1
Dhan Bahadur Chand	Nepali Congress		10 July 1959	15 December 1960	1
Renu Chand	CPN (Maoist Centre)	Sudurpaschchim, Women	4 March 2024		1
Pooja Chaudhary	People's Socialist Party, Nepal	Madhesh, Women	4 March 2024		1
Hari Ram Chaudhary	Nepal Communist Party; CPN (Maoist Centre)	Sudurpashchim, Open	4 March 2018	3 March 2024	1
Kainya Chaudhary	Nominated	Kailali	26 December 1995	27 June 2001	1
Mahesh Chaudhary	CPN (UML)	Mid-Western Region	26 June 1991	27 June 1997	1

== D ==
Member	Party	Region/Category	Date of appointment	Date of retirement	Terms
Bishweshwara Dahal	CPN (UML)	Open	10 July 1999	2003	1
Chet Kumar Dahal	Nepali Congress	Women	26 June 1991	25 June 1995	1
Devendra Dahal	Nepal Communist Party; CPN (UML)	Province 1, Open	4 March 2020	3 March 2026	1
Narayan Dahal	CPN (Maoist Centre)	Nominated	12 April 2022		1
Shashikala Dahal	Nepal Communist Party; CPN (Maoist Centre)	Province 2, Women	4 March 2018	3 March 2022	1
Tulsa Dahal	Nepal Communist Party; CPN (UML)	Province 2, Women	4 March 2020	3 March 2026	1
Prem Prasad Dangal	CPN (UML)	Bagmati, Open	9 March 2026		1
Ramchandra Rai Danuwar	Nepal Communist Party; CPN (UML)	Bagmati, Disability or Ethnic Minority	4 March 2018	3 March 2024	1
Kumar Dasaudi	CPN (UML)	Lumbini, Open	10 February 2023	4 March 2024	1
Jitendra Narayan Dev	Nepali Congress	Province 2, Open	4 March 2018	3 March 2024	1
Anita Devkota	Nepali Congress	Lumbini, Women	4 March 2018		1
Bachspati Devkota	CPN (UML)	Open	10 July 1999	2003	1
Gita Devkota	Nepali Congress	Bagmati, Women	9 March 2026		
Goma Devkota	CPN (UML)	Central Region	27 June 1997	26 June 2003	1
Khim Lal Devkota	Independent	Bagmati, Open	28 May 2021	3 March 2024	1
Rajeshwar Devkota	Rastriya Prajatantra Party	Open	13 November 1995	27 June 2001	1
Samjhana Devkota	CPN (UML)	Gandaki,Women	9 March 2026		
Bir Mani Dhakal	Nepali Congress	Open	26 June 1991	25 June 1995	1
Khagendra Raj Dhakal	Nepali Congress	Open	26 June 1991	25 June 1995	1
Prem Singh Dhami	CPN (UML)	Open	26 June 1991	25 June 1995	1
Ananda Prasad Dhungana	Nepali Congress	Madhesh, Open	4 March 2024		1
Chandra Raj Dhungel	CPN (UML)	Open	26 June 1991	25 June 1995	1
Mahesh Mani Acharya Dixit	CPN (UML)	Open	27 June 2001	2003	1

== F ==
Member	Party	Region/Category	Date of appointment	Date of retirement	Terms
Khem Narayan Faujdar	Nepali Congress	Western Region	26 June 1991	27 June 1997	1

== G ==
Member	Party	Region/Category	Date of appointment	Date of retirement	Terms
Rajya Laxmi Gaire	CPN (Unified Socialist)	Lumbini, Women	4 March 2022		
Bam Dev Gautam	Nepal Communist Party; CPN (UML); CPN (Unified Socialist)	Nominated	17 September 2020	18 January 2026	1
Indira Gautam	Nepal Communist Party; CPN (UML)	Province 1, Women	4 March 2020	3 March 2026	1
Komal Bahadur Ghale	Nepali Congress	Open	27 June 1997	26 June 2003	1
Dil Bahadur Gharti	Nepali Congress	Open	10 July 1999	2003	1
Balaram Gharti Magar	Rastriya Prajatantra Party	Mid-Western Region	27 June 1997	26 June 2003	1
Basudev Ghimire	Nepali Congress	Lumbini, Disability/Ethnic Minority	9 March 2026		
Bimala Ghimire	Nepal Communist Party; CPN (UML)	Lumbini, Women	4 March 2020	3 March 2026	1
Dev Raj Ghimire	CPN (UML)	Eastern Region	27 June 1997	26 June 2003	1
Devendra Ghimire	CPN (UML)	Western Region	27 June 1997	26 June 2003	1
Krishna Prasad Ghimire	Nominated	Kathmandu	26 June 1991	27 June 1997	1
Pashupati Nath Ghosh	Nominated		13 July 1959	15 December 1960	1
Tulsi Giri	Nepali Congress		10 July 1959	15 December 1960	1
Bakhan Singh Gurung	Nepali Congress		10 July 1959	15 December 1960	1
Dipa Gurung	Nepal Communist Party; CPN (UML)	Gandaki, Women	4 March 2018	3 March 2024	1
Dipak Bahadur Gurung	Nepali Congress	Open	27 June 2001	2003	1
Durga Gurung	Nepali Congress	Karnali, Women	4 March 2022		1
Lal Kaji Gurung	Nepali Congress	Open	26 June 1991	27 June 1997	1
Nar Bahadur Gurung	Nepali Congress	Western Region	26 June 1991	25 June 1995	1
Parshuram Megi Gurung	Nepal Communist Party; CPN (UML)	Province 1, Open	4 March 2018	3 March 2022	1
Sidhhi Nath Gyawali	CPN (UML)	Open	27 June 1993	27 June 1999	1
Yubaraj Gyawali	CPN (UML)	Open	27 June 1997	26 June 2003	1

== H ==
Member	Party	Region/Category	Date of appointment	Date of retirement	Terms
Ram Lakhan Harijan	Nepal Communist Party; CPN (UML)	Lumbini, Dalit	4 March 2018	3 March 2022	1
Mani Harsha Jyoti	Nominated		13 July 1959	15 December 1960	1

== J ==
Member	Party	Region/Category	Date of appointment	Date of retirement	Terms
Rekha Kumari Jha	CPN (UML)	Madhesh, Women	9 March 2026		1
Ram Kumari Jhakri	CPN (UML)	Lumbini, Women	9 March 2026		1
Durga Dutt Joshi	Nepali Congress	Far-Western Region	26 June 1991	26 June 1993	1
Ganga Datta Joshi	Nepali Congress	Far-Western Region	27 June 1997	26 June 2003	1
Hora Prasad Joshi	Nominated		13 July 1959	15 December 1960	1
Rang Nath Joshi	CPN (UML)	Mid-Western Region	27 June 2001	2003	1
Tara Devi Joshi	Nepali Congress	Sudurpashchim, Women	4 March 2018	3 March 2022	1
Rup Jyoti	Nominated	Chitwan	27 June 2001	2003	1

== K ==
Member	Party	Region/Category	Date of appointment	Date of retirement	Terms
Indu Kadariya	Nepal Communist Party; CPN (UML)	Sudurpashchim, Women	4 March 2018	3 March 2024	1
Dal Singh Kami	Nepali Congress	Open	26 June 1991	26 June 1993	1
Sahshra Nath Kapali	Nominated		13 July 1959	15 December 1960	1
Beni Bahadur Karki	Nepali Congress	Open	26 June 1991	27 June 1999	2
Hem Bahadur Karki	Nominated	Syangja	26 June 1991	25 June 1995	1
Janak Bahadur Karmacharya	Nepali Congress	Far-Western Region	26 June 1991	27 June 1997	1
Ranjit Karna	Nepali Congress	Disability or Ethnic Minority	9 March 2026		1
Kapileshwar Kayastha	Nepali Congress	Open	27 June 1993	27 June 1999	1
Chandra Bahadur K.C.	Nepali Congress	Lumbini, Open	9 March 2026		
Chandra Bahadur Khadka	Nepal Communist Party; CPN (Maoist Centre)	Lumbini, Open	4 March 2018	28 April 2021	1
Durga Keshar Khanal	Nepali Congress	Mid-Western Region	26 June 1991	25 June 1995	1
Ganesh Prasad Kharel	Nominated		13 July 1959	15 December 1960	1
Khamma Bahadur Khati	Nepali Congress	Sudurpashchim, Open	9 March 2026		1
Dhana Khatiwada	Nepali Congress	Bagmati, Women	4 March 2018	3 March 2020	1
Yuba Raj Khatiwada	Nepal Communist Party; CPN (UML)	Nominated	10 March 2018	3 March 2020	1
Ashok Koirala	Nepali Congress	Open	27 June 2001	2003	1
Gaura Koirala	CPN (UML)	Open	10 July 1999	26 June 2003	1
Matrika Prasad Koirala	Nominated		13 July 1959	15 December 1960	1
Rukmini Koirala	CPN (UML)	Koshi, Women	4 March 2024		1
Pramila Kumari	People's Socialist Party	Province 2, Women	4 March 2018	3 March 2024	1
Raj Kumar Kunwar	Nepal Communist Party; CPN (Maoist Centre)	Lumbini; Disability or Ethnic Minority	4 March 2018	3 March 2020	1
Sher Bahadur Kunwar	Nepal Communist Party; CPN (UML)	Sudurpashchim, Open	4 March 2018	3 March 2022	1

== L ==
Member	Party	Region/Category	Date of appointment	Date of retirement	Terms
Brikhesh Chandra Lal	Rastriya Janata Party	Province 2 Disability or Ethnic Minority	4 March 2018	3 March 2020	1
Chhiring Tenzing Lama	Nominated		13 July 1959	15 December 1960	1
Yutul Lama	Nepal Communist Party; CPN (Maoist Centre)	Karnali, Women	4 March 2018	3 March 2020	1
Indra Hang Limbu	Nepali Congress	Open	26 June 1991	26 June 1993	1
Nar Pati Luwar	Nepal Communist Party; CPN (UML)	Karnali, Dalit	4 March 2018	3 March 2024	1

== M ==
Member	Party	Region/Category	Date of appointment	Date of retirement	Terms
Mahesh Kumar Mahara	Nepal Communist Party; CPN (Maoist Centre)	Sudurpashchim, Disability or Ethnic Minority	4 March 2018	3 March 2024	1
Uttam Kumar Mahat Chhetri	CPN (UML)	Eastern Region	28 June 1999	2003	1
Kali Bahadur Malla	Nepal Communist Party; CPN (Maoist Centre)	Karnali, Open	4 March 2018	3 March 2020	1
Savitri Malla	CPN (Unified Socialist)	Karnali, Women	4 March 2024		1
Suresh Malla	Nepali Congress	Far-Western Region	26 June 1991	25 June 1995	1
Laxmi Das Manandhar	CPN (UML)	Open	27 June 2001	2003	1
Shanti Manawi	CPN (UML)	Open	13 November 1995	27 June 2001	1
Satya Narayan Mandal	CPN (UML)	Eastern Region	26 June 1991	26 June 1993	1
Bhikhari Mansoor	Nepali Congress	Open	26 June 1991	26 June 1993	1
Roshni Meche	CPN (UML)	Koshi, Women	9 March 2026		1
Mahendra Kumar Mishra	Nepali Congress	Open	26 June 1991	26 June 1993	2
Mahendra Kumar Mishra	Nepali Congress	Central Region	28 June 1995	27 June 2001	2
Narayan Dutta Mishra	Nepali Congress	Sudurpashchim, Open	4 March 2022		1
Mohammad Mohsin	Rastriya Prajatantra Party	Open	27 June 1997	26 June 2003	1
Shilu Pyari Muli	Nepali Congress	Women	13 November 1995	27 June 2001	1

== N ==
Member	Party	Region/Category	Date of appointment	Date of retirement	Terms
Baburam Nakarmi	Nepali Congress	Central Region	26 June 1991	25 June 1995	1
Mukti Nath Sharma	Nominated		13 July 1959	15 December 1960	1
Subas Chandra Nemwang	CPN (UML)	Eastern Region	26 June 1991	26 June 1993	2
Subas Chandra Nemwang	CPN (UML)	Open	13 November 1995	May 1999	2
Madhav Kumar Nepal	CPN (UML)	Open	26 June 1991	27 June 1999	2
Pradeep Nepal	CPN (UML)	Open	26 June 1991	26 June 1993	2
Pradeep Nepal	CPN (UML)	Open	27 June 1997	May 1999	2
Khem Raj Nepali	Nepal Communist Party; CPN (UML)	Province 1, Dalit	4 March 2018	3 March 2020	1
Bhagwati Neupane	Nepal Communist Party; CPN (UML)	Gandaki, Women	4 March 2020	18 January 2026	1
Judhha Bahadur Neupane	Nepali Congress	Open	27 June 1993	27 June 1999	1
Kedar Prasad Neupane	CPN (UML)	Central Region	28 June 1999	2003	1
Tilak Prasad Neupane	Nepali Congress	Open	10 July 1999	2003	1

== O ==
Member	Party	Region/Category	Date of appointment	Date of retirement	Terms
Nainakala Ojha	Nepal Communist Party; CPN (UML)	Province 1, Women	4 March 2018	3 March 2022	1
Kamala Oli	Nepal Communist Party; CPN (UML)	Sudurpashchim, Women	4 March 2018	3 March 2020	1
Komal Oli	Nepal Communist Party; CPN (UML)	Lumbini, Women	4 March 2018	3 March 2022	1

== P ==
Member	Party	Region/Category	Date of appointment	Date of retirement	Terms
Badri Pandey	Nepali Congress	Sudurpashchim, Open	4 March 2018	3 March 2020	1
Dirgha Narayan Pandey	Nepali Congress	Lumbini, Open	9 June 2021	3 March 2022	1
Hari Prasad Pandey	CPN (UML)	Open	26 June 1991	26 June 1993	1
Piyush Raj Pandey	Samyukta Prajatantra Party		10 July 1959	15 December 1960	1
Ramesh Nath Pandey	Nominated	Kathmandu	28 June 1999	2003	1
Surendra Prasad Pandey	CPN (UML)	Open	27 June 1997	26 June 2003	1
Surendra Raj Pandey	Nepali Congress	Gandaki, Open	4 March 2018	3 March 2020	1
Ambika Pant	Nepali Congress	Women	10 July 1999	2003	1
Kamala Pant	Nepali Congress	Gandaki, Women	4 March 2022		1
Prakash Pant	Nepali Congress	Gandaki, Disability or Ethnic Minority	4 March 2018	3 March 2024	1
Urba Dutta Pant	CPN (UML)	Far-Western Region	27 June 2001	2003	1
Nilambar Panthi	Nepali Congress	Open	26 June 1991	26 June 1993	1
Padma Bahadur Pariya	Nepali Congress	Gandaki, Dalit	4 March 2024		1
Rishi Babu Pariyar	Nominated	Chitwan	28 June 1999	2003	1
Jagar Parki	CPN (Maoist Centre)	Sudurpaschim, Dalit	4 March 2022		1
Dharmendra Paswan	Nepali Congress	Madhesh, Dalit	9 March 2026		
Radheshyam Paswan	Nepal Communist Party; CPN (Maoist Centre)	Province 2, Dalit	4 March 2020	3 March 2026	1
Ramprit Paswan	CPN (UML)	Eastern Region	27 June 2001	2003	
Ramprit Paswan	Samajbadi Party	Province 2, Dalit	4 March 2018	3 March 2020	
Bidur Prasad Paudel	Nepali Congress	Open	26 June 1991	27 June 1997	1
Bimala Rai Paudyal	Nepal Communist Party; CPN (Unified Marxist–Leninist)	Nominated	10 March 2018	3 March 2024	1
Jagannath Paudel	Nepali Congress	Open	27 June 1997	26 June 2003	1
Krishna Prasad Paudel	Nepali Congress	Bagmati, Open	4 March 2022		1
Hari Prasad Paudyal	Nominated	Lalitpur	26 June 1991	26 June 1993	1
Bina Pokharel	Nepal Communist Party; CPN (Maoist Centre)	Province 1, Women	4 March 2018	3 March 2024	1
Ishwar Pokharel	CPN (UML)	Open	27 June 1997	May 1999	1
Sharada Pokharel	Nominated	Morang	13 November 1995	27 June 2001	1
Somannath Portel	CPN (UML)	Koshi, Dalit	9 March 2026		
Bharat Kumar Pradhan	CPN (UML)	Open	26 June 1991	27 June 1997	1
Triveni Prasad Pradhan	Nepali Congress		10 July 1959	15 December 1960	1
Aishwarya Lal Pradhananga	Nepali Congress	Open	26 June 1991	26 June 1993	1
Laxmi Narayan Prasad	Nominated	Rautahat	26 June 1991	26 June 1993	1
Sarita Prasai	Nepali Congress	Province 1, Women	4 March 2018	3 March 2020	1
Bishnu Devi Pudasaini	Nepali Congress	Bagmati, Women	4 March 2024		1
Jit Bahadur Puri	Nepali Congress	Open	10 July 1999	2003	1
Thagendra Puri	Nepal Communist Party; CPN (UML)	Karnali, Open	4 March 2018	3 March 2022	1
Sindhu Nath Pyakurel	Samyukta Janamorcha	Open	26 June 1991	25 June 1995	1
Suman Raj Pyakurel	Nepal Communist Party; CPN (UML)	Province 2, Open	4 March 2018	3 March 2022	1

== R ==
Member	Party	Region/Category	Date of appointment	Date of retirement	Terms
Bal Bahadur Rai	Nepali Congress	Open	10 July 1959	15 December 1960	2
Bal Bahadur Rai	Nepali Congress	Open	27 June 2001	2003	2
Jayanti Rai	CPN (Unified Socialist)	Province 1, Women	4 March 2022		1
Laghudhan Rai	Nominated	Okhaldhunga	26 December 1995	27 June 2001	1
Meena Singh Rakhal	CPN (UML)	Karnali, Women	9 March 2026		1
Baburam Rana	Nominated	Rupandehi	26 June 1991	27 June 1997	1
Bramha Shamsher J.B. Rana	Nepali Congress		10 July 1959	15 December 1960	1
Kamal Rana	Nominated		13 July 1959	15 December 1960	1
Shubha Shamsher J.B. Rana	Nepal Rashtrabadi Gorkha Parishad		10 July 1959	15 December 1960	1
Brinda Rana Magar	Nepali Congress	Gandaki, Women	4 March 2018	3 March 2020	1
Sita Nanda Ray	CPN (UML)	Open	13 November 1995	27 June 2001	1
Parvati Rawal	Nepal Communist Party; CPN (UML)	Bagmati, Women	4 March 2018	3 March 2024	1
Ramesh Jung Rayamajhi	Nepali Congress	Province 1, Open	4 March 2018	3 March 2024	1
Khagendra Raj Regmi	Independent	Open	January 2002	2003	1
Basudev Rijal	Nepali Congress	Open	26 June 1991	26 June 1993	2
Basudev Rijal	Nepali Congress	Open	10 July 1999	2003	2
Chiranjibi Prasad Rijal	Nepali Congress	Eastern Region	28 June 1995	27 June 2001	1
Ghanashyam Rijal	CPN (Unified Socialist)	Bagmati, Dalit	4 March 2024		1
Nagendra Prasad Rijal	Nominated		13 July 1959	15 December 1960	1
Krishna Bahadur Rokaya	Nepali Congress	Karnali, Open	4 March 2024		1

== S ==
Member	Party	Region/Category	Date of appointment	Date of retirement	Terms
Vishnu Kumari Sapkota	Nepali Congress	Lumbini, Women	4 March 2024		1
Golchhe Sarki	CPN (UML)	Open	26 June 1991	27 June 1997	1
Chanda Shah	Rastriya Prajatantra Party	Women	27 June 1997	26 June 2003	1
Dilip Kumar Shahi	Nepali Congress	Central Region	10 July 1959	15 December 1960	2
Dilip Kumar Shahi	Nepali Congress	Central Region	26 June 1991	27 June 1997	2
Dipta Prakash Shah	Nominated	Dailekh	27 June 2001	5 September 2002	1
Khadga Bikram Shah	Nepali Congress	Mid-Western Region	26 June 1991	26 June 1993	1
Lalit Jung Shahi	Nepali Congress	Karnali, Open	9 March 2026		
Madan Kumari Shah	CPN (Unified Socialist)	Sudurpashchim, Women	4 March 2022		1
Anjan Shakya	CPN (UML)	Nominated	18 April 2024		1
Ashta Laxmi Shakya	CPN (UML)	Women	26 June 1991	26 June 1993	1
Gopal Man Shakya	CPN (UML)	Central Region	26 June 1991	26 June 1993	1
Bal Chandra Sharma	Nominated		13 July 1959	15 December 1960	1
Bharat Mani Sharma	Nominated		13 July 1959	15 December 1960	1
Dina Nath Sharma	Nepal Communist Party; CPN (Maoist Centre)	Gandaki, Open	4 March 2018	3 March 2022	1
Diwakar Sharma	Nepal Rashtrabadi Gorkha Parishad		10 July 1959	15 December 1960	1
Jag Prasad Sharma	Nepal Communist Party; CPN (Maoist Centre)	Lumbini, Disability or Ethnic Minority	4 March 2020	3 March 2026	1
Manrupa Sharma	CPN (Maoist Centre)	Gandaki, Women	4 March 2024		1
Maya Prasad Sharma	Nepal Communist Party; CPN (Maoist Centre)	Karnali, Open	4 March 2020	3 March 2026	1
Nanda Sharma	Nepal Communist Party; CPN (UML); CPN (Unified Socialist)	Karnali, Women	4 March 2018	3 March 2024	1
Purna Kumar Sharma	Nominated	Panchthar	26 June 1991	25 June 1995	1
Rabindra Nath Sharma	Rastriya Prajatantra Party	Open	13 November 1995	27 June 2001	1
Shukra Raj Sharma	Nepali Congress	Open	10 July 1999	2003	1
Sushila Sharma	Nepali Congress	Women	26 June 1991	27 June 1997	1
Udaya Sharma	Nepal Communist Party; CPN (UML)	Bagmati, Women	4 March 2018	3 March 2022	1
Yubaraj Sharma	Nepali Congress	Lumbini, Open	4 March 2022		1
Mohan Raj Sharma Chapagain	Nominated	Nawalparasi	28 June 1999	2003	1
Ghanashyam Sharma Paudyal	Samyukta Janamorcha	Open	26 June 1991	26 June 1993	1
Diwakar Man Sherchan	Nepali Congress	Western Region	26 June 1991	26 June 1993	1
Sonam Gyaljen Sherpa	CPN (UML)	Province 1, Disability or Ethnic Minority	4 March 2022		1
Yangkila Sherpa	Nominated	Solukhumbu	27 June 2001	2003	1
Hari Charan Shiwakoti	Nepal Communist Party; CPN (UML)	Province 1, Open	4 March 2018	3 March 2020	1
Bhairav Sundar Shrestha	Nepal Communist Party; CPN (UML)	Karnali, Open	4 March 2018	3 March 2024	1
Bhim Bahadur Shrestha	Nepali Congress	Open	13 November 1995	27 June 2001	1
Bhim Prasad Shrestha	Nepali Congress	Mid-Western Region	27 June 1993	27 June 1999	1
Dil Bahadur Shrestha	Nominated		13 July 1959	15 December 1960	1
Jiwan Prem Shrestha	Nepali Congress	Western Region	28 June 1995	27 June 2001	1
Keshav Lal Shrestha	CPN (UML)	Open	13 November 1995	27 June 2001	1
Kiran Babu Shrestha	Nepali Congress	Gandaki, Open	4 March 2024		1
Maiya Devi Shrestha	Nepali Congress	Women	27 June 2001	2003	1
Narayan Kaji Shrestha	Nepal Communist Party; CPN (Maoist Centre)	Gandaki, Open	4 March 2020	18 January 2026	1
Omkar Prasad Shrestha	Nepali Congress	Open	13 November 1995	27 June 2001	1
Rabindra Shrestha	Nepali Congress	Open	27 June 1997	26 June 2003	1
Ram Man Shrestha	CPN (UML)	Open	27 June 1997	26 June 2003	1
Shambhu Ram Shrestha	Communist Party of Nepal		10 July 1959	15 December 1960	1
Shriram Shrestha (Pradhan)	Nepali Congress	Open	26 June 1991	25 June 1995	1
Mohammad Khalid Siddiqui	People's Socialist Party	Madhesh, Open	4 March 2022		1
Bir Bahadur Singh	CPN (UML)	Mid-Western Region	28 June 1999	2003	1
Dambar Bahadur Singh	Nominated		13 July 1959	15 December 1960	1
Gajendra Narayan Singh	Nepal Sadbhawana Party	Open	10 July 1999	23 January 2002	1
Laxman Jung Bahadur Singh	Nominated		13 July 1959	15 December 1960	1
Prakash Man Singh	Nepali Congress	Open	13 November 1995	27 June 2001	1
Prem Bahadur Singh	CPN (UML)	Open	26 June 1991	27 June 1997	1
Ram Jiwan Singh	Nepali Congress	Open	27 June 2001	2003	1
Shekhar Singh	People's Socialist Party; Loktantrik Samajwadi Party	Province 2, Disability or Ethnic Minority	4 March 2020	3 March 2026	1
Dilli Prasad Sitaula	Nepali Congress	Eastern Region	26 June 1991	27 June 1997	1
Krishna Prasad Sitaula	Nepali Congress	Koshi, Open	4 March 2024		1
Chakra Prasad Snehi	Nepal Communist Party; CPN (UML)	Sudurpashchim, Dalit	4 March 2018	3 March 2022	1
Shukra Raj Sonyok	Nepali Congress	Open	27 June 1997	26 June 2003	1
Jhakku Prasad Subedi	CPN (Maoist Centre)	Bagmati, Open	4 March 2024		1
Bhuwan Sunar	CPN (Maoist Centre)	Gandaki, Dalit	4 March 2022		1
Nagendra Bahadur Swar	Nepal Rashtrabadi Gorkha Parishad		10 July 1959	15 December 1960	1
Taraman Swar	Nepal Communist Party; CPN (Maoist Centre)	Sudurpashchim, Open	4 March 2020	3 March 2026	1

== T ==
Member	Party	Region/Category	Date of appointment	Date of retirement	Terms
Chandra Man Thakali	Nominated		13 July 1959	15 December 1960	1
Krisha Lal Thakali	Nominated	Mustang	13 November 1995	27 June 2001	1
Shrimaya Thakali	CPN (UML)	Western Region	27 June 2001	2003	1
Arbinda Kumar Thakur	Nepali Congress	Open	27 June 1997	26 June 2003	1
Mahantha Thakur	People's Socialist Party, Nepal	Madhesh, Open	9 March 2026		1
Aindra Bikram Thamsuhang	Nominated	Panchthar	22 July 1997	26 June 2003	1
Dal Singh Thapa	Nepali Congress	Open	27 June 1993	27 June 1999	1
Lok Bahadur Thapa	Rastriya Prajatantra Party	Open	27 June 2001	2003	1
Ram Bahadur Thapa	Nepal Communist Party; CPN (Maoist Centre)	Bagmati, Open	4 March 2018	18 April 2021	1
Sunil Bahadur Thapa	Nepali Congress	Koshi, Open	9 March 2026		1
Surya Bahadur Thapa	Nominated		13 July 1959	15 December 1960	1
Tham Maya Thapa	CPN (UML)	Open	10 July 1999	27 June 2001	1
Ganesh Prasad Timilsina	Nepal Communist Party; CPN (UML)	Gandaki, Open	4 March 2018	3 March 2024	1
Goma Devi Timilsina	CPN (Unified Socialist)	Bagmati, Women	4 March 2022		1
Jagat Timilsina	Nepali Congress	Gandaki, Open	9 March 2026		
Ashok Nath Tiwari	Nominated	Kathmandu	22 July 1997	26 June 2003	1

== U ==
Member	Party	Region/Category	Date of appointment	Date of retirement	Terms
Amod Prasad Upadhyaya	Nominated	Morang	26 June 1991	25 June 1995	1
Balaram Upadhyaya	CPN (UML)	Open	26 June 1991	27 June 1997	1
Bodh Prasad Upadhyaya	Nepali Congress		10 July 1959	15 December 1960	1
Durga Prasad Upadhyaya	Nepali Congress	Lumbini, Open	4 March 2018	3 March 2020	1
Surya Prasad Upadhyaya	Nepali Congress		10 July 1959	15 December 1960	1
Yog Prasad Upadhyaya	Nepali Congress	Open	10 July 1999	27 June 2001	1
Shankar Prasad Upreti	Nepali Congress	Eastern Region	27 June 1993	27 June 1999	1

== V ==
Member	Party	Region/Category	Date of appointment	Date of retirement	Terms
Brijananda Verma	Nepali Congress		10 July 1959	15 December 1960	1
Yugeshwar Prasad Verma	Nominated	Mahottari	26 June 1991	25 June 1995	1

== Y ==
Member	Party	Region/Category	Date of appointment	Date of retirement	Terms
Amiya Kumar Yadav	Nepali Congress	Open	10 July 1999	2003	1
Mahadev Prasad Yadav	Nepali Congress	Central Region	27 June 1993	27 June 1999	1
Mrigendra Singh Yadav	People's Socialist Party	Province 2, Open	4 March 2020	3 March 2026	1
Mukta Kumari Yadav	Nepali Congress	Province 2, Women	4 March 2018	3 March 2020	1
Ramesh Prasad Yadav	Rastriya Janata Party	Province 2 Disability or Ethnic Minority	18 March 2018	3 March 2020	1
Rameshwar Raya Yadav	Nepal Sadbhawana Party	Open	26 June 1991	27 June 1997	1
