= List of current members of the National Assembly (Nepal) =

The Parliament of Nepal a bicameral legislature composed of the National Assembly and the House of Representatives. Membership is limited to 59 members; eight for each province, regardless of population by an electoral college of each province, and three are appointed by the President of Nepal on recommendation of the government. Members sit for overlapping six years terms, with one-third of the members retiring every two years.

== Koshi Province ==
Keys: CPN (UML) (4) Congress (3) NCP (1)

Category	Name	Party	Assumed office	Class	Portfolio & Responsibilities
Open	Sunil Bahadur Thapa	Congress	9 March 2026	1	
Women	Roshni Meche	CPN (UML)	9 March 2026	1	
Dalit	Somannath Portel	CPN (UML)	9 March 2026	1	
Open	Krishna Prasad Sitaula	Congress	4 March 2024	3	Parliamentary party leader of Nepali Congress (9 March 2024- 29 April 2026)
Women	Rukmini Koirala	CPN (UML)	4 March 2024	3	
Open	Gopal Basnet	Congress	4 March 2022	2	
Women	Jayanti Rai	NCP	4 March 2022	2	
With Disability or Ethnic Minority	Sonam Gyaljen Sherpa	CPN (UML)	4 March 2022	2	

== Madhesh Province ==
Keys: Congress (3) PSP-Nepal (3) NCP (1) CPN (UML) (1)

Category	Name	Party	Assumed office	Class	Portfolio & Responsibilities
Open	Mahantha Thakur	PSP-Nepal	9 March 2026	1	
Women	Rekha Kumari Jha	CPN (UML)	9 March 2026	1	
With Disability or Ethnic Minority	Ranjit Karna	Congress	9 March 2026	1	
Dalit	Dharmendra Paswan	Congress	9 March 2026	1	
Open	Ananda Prasad Dhungana	Congress	4 March 2024	3	
Women	Pooja Chaudhary	PSP-Nepal	4 March 2024	3	
Open	Mohammad Khalid	PSP-Nepal	4 March 2022	2	
Women	Urmila Aryal	NCP	4 March 2022	2	

== Bagmati Province ==
Keys: Congress (4) NCP (3) CPN (UML) (1)

Category	Name	Party	Assumed office	Class	Portfolio & Responsibilities
Open	Prem Prasad Dangal	CPN (UML)	9 March 2026	1	
Women	Gita Devkota	Congress	9 March 2026	1	
Open	Jit Jung Basnet	Congress	4 March 2024	3	
Women	Bishnu Devi Pudasaini	Congress	4 March 2024	3	
With Disability or Ethnic Minority	Shrikrishna Adhikari	NCP	4 March 2024	3	
Dalit	Ghanashyam Rijal	NCP	4 March 2024	3	
Women	Goma Devi Timilsina	NCP	4 March 2022	2	
Open	Krishna Prasad Paudel	Congress	4 March 2022	2	

== Gandaki Province ==
Keys: Congress (4) NCP (3) CPN (UML) (1)

Category	Name	Party	Assumed office	Class	Portfolio & Responsibilities
Open	Jagat Timilsina	Congress	9 March 2026	1	
Women	Samjhana Devkota	CPN (UML)	9 March 2026	1	
Open	Kiran Babu Shrestha	Congress	4 March 2024	3	
Women	Manrupa Sharma	NCP	4 March 2024	3	
With Disability or Ethnic Minority	Padma Bahadur Pariyar	Congress	4 March 2024	3	
Open	Suresh Ale Magar	NCP	4 March 2022	2	
Women	Kamala Panta	Congress	4 March 2022	2	Parliamentary party leader of Nepali Congress.; (since 29 April 2026)
Dalit	Bhuwan Sunar	NCP	4 March 2022	2	

== Lumbini Province ==
Keys: Congress (4) NCP (2) CPN (UML) (1) Janamorcha (1)

Category	Name	Party	Assumed office	Class	Portfolio & Responsibilities
Open	Chandra Bahadur K.C.	Congress	9 March 2026	1	
Women	Ram Kumari Jhakri	CPN (UML)	9 March 2026	1	
With Disability or Ethnic Minority	Basudev Ghimire	Congress	9 March 2026	1	
Open	Jhakku Prasad Subedi	NCP	4 March 2024	3	
Women	Vishnu Kumari Sapkota	Congress	4 March 2024	3	
Open	Yubaraj Sharma	Congress	4 March 2022	2	
Women	Rajya Laxmi Gaire	NCP	4 March 2022	2	
Dalit	Tul Prasad Bishwakarma	Janamorcha	4 March 2022	2	

== Karnali Province ==
NCP (4) Congress (3) CPN (UML) (1)

Category	Name	Party	Assumed office	Class	Portfolio & Responsibilities
Open	Lalit Jung Shahi	Congress	9 March 2026	1	
Women	Meena Singh Rakhal	CPN (UML)	9 March 2026	1	
Open	Krishna Bahadur Rokaya	Congress	4 March 2024	3	Chief Whip of Nepali Congress
Women	Savitri Malla	NCP	4 March 2024	3	
Dalit	Bishnu BK	NCP	4 March 2024	3	
Open	Udaya Bohara	NCP	4 March 2022	2	
Women	Durga Gurung	Congress	4 March 2022	2	
With Disability or Ethnic Minority	Nara Bahadur Bista	NCP	4 March 2022	2	

== Sudurpashchim Province ==
Keys: Congress (3) NCP (3) CPN (UML) (1)

Category	Name	Party	Assumed office	Class	Portfolio & Responsibilities
Open	Khamma Bahadur Khati	Congress	9 March 2026	1	
Women	Lila Kumari Bhandari	CPN (UML)	9 March 2026	1	
Open				3	
Women	Renu Chand	NCP	4 March 2024	3	
With Disability or Ethnic Minority	Narayan Bhatta	Congress	4 March 2024	3	
Women	Madan Kumari Shah	NCP	4 March 2022	2	
Open	Narayan Dutta Mishra	Congress	4 March 2022	2	
Dalit	Jagat Parki	NCP	4 March 2022	2	

== Nominated ==
Keys: NCP (1) CPN (UML) (1)

Category	Name	Party	Assumed office	Class	Portfolio & Responsibilities
				1	
	Anjan Shakya	CPN (UML)	18 April 2024	3	
	Narayan Prasad Dahal	NCP	12 April 2022	2	Chair of the National Assembly

== Members of the National Assembly Partywise ==
Party	After 2018 election	After 2020 election	After 2022 election	After 2024 election	At time of dissolution of HoR	After 2026 Election
Nepali Congress	13	6	10	16	10	24
Nepali Communist Party	—	—	CPN (Maoist Centre)			18 (Note: 17 elected and 1 nominated)
CPN (UML)	29	—	17	11	18 (Note: 17 elected (including chairperson) and 1 nominated)	12 (Note: 11 elected and 1 nominated)
People's Socialist Party, Nepal	—	—	3	3	3	2
Loktantrik Samajwadi Party, Nepal	—	—	1	1	1	1
Rastriya Janamorcha	—	—	1	1	1	1
Independent	—	—	1	1	1	—
CPN (Maoist Centre)	13	—	16	18	16 (Note: 15 elected and 1 nominated)	(Note: Party merged with CPN (Unified Socialist) and renamed as NCP)
CPN (Unified Socialist)	—	—	9	8	9 (Note: 8 elected and 1 nominated)	(Note: Party merged with CPN (Maoist Centre) and renamed as NCP)
Nepal Communist Party	—	50	Party separated			
Rastriya Janata Party Nepal	2	2	—	—	—	—
Federal Socialist Forum, Nepal	2	—	—	—	—	—
Samajbadi Party, Nepal	—	1	—	—	—	—
Total	59	59	59	59	59	58
