= 2018 Nepalese National Assembly election =

- 7 February 2018

56 seats to the National Assembly
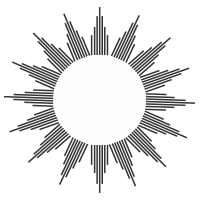

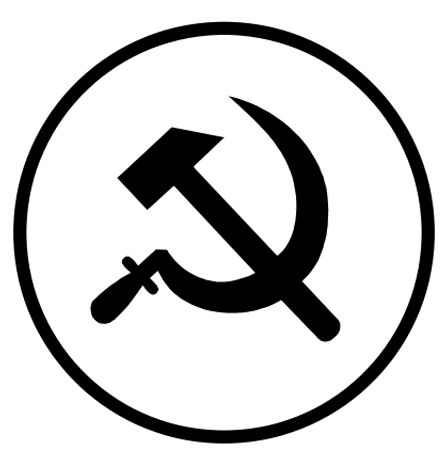

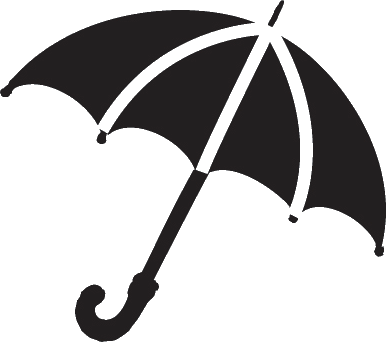

	First party	Second party	Third party
Party	CPN (UML)	Congress	Maoist Centre
Seats won	27	13	12
	Fourth party	Fifth party
Party	RJPN	Forum Nepal
Seats won	2	2
Elected Chairperson of the National Assembly
Ganesh Prasad Timilsina
CPN (UML)

National Assembly elections were held in Nepal on 7 February 2018 across all seven provinces to form the first National Assembly since the adoption of the new constitution in 2015. According to Article 86 of the Constitution of Nepal 2015, the members of the National Assembly are elected every six years through an electoral college. In addition to this, one-third of the members are retired every two years for six years by drawing a lottery.

== Electoral college ==
The electoral college consists of members of the provincial assembly and Chairperson/Mayor and Vice Chairperson/Deputy Mayor of the local bodies within the state. Each provincial assembly members vote has a weight of forty eight whereas each Chairperson/Mayor/Vice Chairperson/Deputy Mayor vote has a weight of eighteen. The electoral college elects 56 members to the National Assembly and three members, including one woman, are nominated by the president on the recommendation of the Government of Nepal.

== Results ==
Party	Seats
Communist Party of Nepal (Unified Marxist–Leninist)	27
Nepali Congress	13
Communist Party of Nepal (Maoist Centre)	12
Federal Socialist Forum, Nepal	2
Rastriya Janata Party Nepal	2
Nominated	3
Total	59
Source: TribuneIndia

=== Province No. 1 ===
Elected MP	Elected Party	Category	Votes
Parshuram Megi Gurung	CPN (Unified Marxist–Leninist)	Open	Unopposed
Haricharan Shiwakoti	CPN (Unified Marxist–Leninist)	Open	Unopposed
Ramesh Jung Rayamajhi	Nepali Congress	Open	Unopposed
Nainakala Ojha	CPN (Unified Marxist–Leninist)	Women	Unopposed
Bina Pokharel	CPN (Maoist Centre)	Women	Unopposed
Sarita Prasai	Nepali Congress	Women	Unopposed
Khem Raj Nepali	CPN (Unified Marxist–Leninist)	Dalit	6,270
Aagam Prasad Bantawa Rai	CPN (Unified Marxist–Leninist)	Disabled/Minority	6,138
Source: Election Commission of Nepal

=== Province No. 2 ===
Elected MP	Elected Party	Category	Votes
Jitendra Dev	Nepali Congress	Open	Unopposed
Ramesh Prasad Yadav	Rastriya Janata Party Nepal	Open	Unopposed
Suman Raj Pyakurel	CPN (Unified Marxist–Leninist)	Open	Unopposed
Shashikala Dahal	CPN (Maoist Centre)	Women	Unopposed
Mukta Kumari Yadav	Nepali Congress	Women	Unopposed
Pramila Kumari	Federal Socialist Forum, Nepal	Women	Unopposed
Ramprit Paswan	Federal Socialist Forum, Nepal	Dalit	Unopposed
Brijesh Chandra Lal	Rastriya Janata Party Nepal	Disabled/Minority	Unopposed
Source: Election Commission of Nepal

=== Province No. 3 ===
Elected MP	Elected Party	Category	Votes
Ram Bahadur Thapa	CPN (Maoist Centre)	Open	3,396
Balram Baskota	CPN (Unified Marxist–Leninist)	Open	3,444
Radheshyam Adhikari	Nepali Congress	Open	2,556
Parvati Rawal	CPN (Unified Marxist–Leninist)	Women	3,276
Udaya Sharma	CPN (Unified Marxist–Leninist)	Women	3,510
Dhana Khatiwada	Nepali Congress	Women	2,376
Singha Bahadur Bishwakarma	CPN (Unified Marxist–Leninist)	Dalit	6,858
Ramchandra Rai Danuwar	CPN (Unified Marxist–Leninist)	Disabled/Minority	6,876
Source: Election Commission of Nepal

=== Province No. 4 ===
Elected MP	Elected Party	Category	Votes
Ganesh Prasad Timilsina	CPN (Unified Marxist–Leninist)	Open	1,782
Dina Nath Sharma	CPN (Maoist Centre)	Open	1,530
Surendra Raj Pandey	Nepali Congress	Open	2,262
Shanti Adhikari	CPN (Unified Marxist–Leninist)	Women	1,512
Dipa Gurung	CPN (Unified Marxist–Leninist)	Women	1,716
Brinda Rana Magar	Nepali Congress	Women	2,274
Khim Bahadur BK	CPN (Maoist Centre)	Dalit	3,396
Prakash Pantha	Nepali Congress	Disabled/Minority	Unopposed
Source: Election Commission of Nepal

=== Province No. 5 ===
Elected MP	Elected Party	Category	Votes
Khim Lal Bhattarai	CPN (Unified Marxist–Leninist)	Open	3,006
Chandra Bahadur Khadka	CPN (Maoist Centre)	Open	2,280
Durga Prasad Upadhyaya	Nepali Congress	Open	2,418
Komal Oli	CPN (Unified Marxist–Leninist)	Women	Unopposed
Mina Budha	CPN (Unified Marxist–Leninist)	Women	Unopposed
Anita Devkota	Nepali Congress	Women	Unopposed
Ram Lakhan Harijan	CPN (Unified Marxist–Leninist)	Dalit	5,508
Raj Kumar Kunwar	CPN (Maoist Centre)	Disabled/Minority	5,340
Source: Election Commission of Nepal

=== Province No. 6 ===
Elected MP	Elected Party	Category	Votes
Bhairab Sundar Shrestha	CPN (Unified Marxist–Leninist)	Open	1,174
Thagendra Puri	CPN (Unified Marxist–Leninist)	Open	1,256
Kali Bahadur Malla	CPN (Maoist Centre)	Open	1,251
Kabita Bogati	CPN (Unified Marxist–Leninist)	Women	1,162
Nanda Sharma	CPN (Unified Marxist–Leninist)	Women	1,268
Yutul Lama	CPN (Maoist Centre)	Women	1,271
Nar Pati Luwar	CPN (Unified Marxist–Leninist)	Dalit	3,666
Jeevan Budha	CPN (Maoist Centre)	Disabled/Minority	3,720
Source: Election Commission of Nepal

=== Province No. 7 ===
Elected MP	Elected Party	Category	Votes
Sher Bahadur Kunwar	CPN (Unified Marxist–Leninist)	Open	Unopposed
Hari Ram Chaudhari	CPN (Maoist Centre)	Open	Unopposed
Badri Pandey	Nepali Congress	Open	Unopposed
Tara Devi Joshi	Nepali Congress	Women	Unopposed
Kamala Oli	CPN (Unified Marxist–Leninist)	Women	Unopposed
Indu Kadariya	CPN (Unified Marxist–Leninist)	Women	Unopposed
Chakra Prasad Snehi	CPN (Unified Marxist–Leninist)	Dalit	3,708
Mahesh Kumar Mahara	CPN (Maoist Centre)	Disabled/Minority	3,708
Source: Election Commission of Nepal

=== Nominated ===
In addition to the elections, three members were nominated to the National Assembly on 20 February 2019.

- Bimala Poudel
- Ram Narayan Bidari
- Yuba Raj Khatiwada
