= 2022 Nepalese National Assembly election =

- 26 January 2022

19 seats to the National Assembly

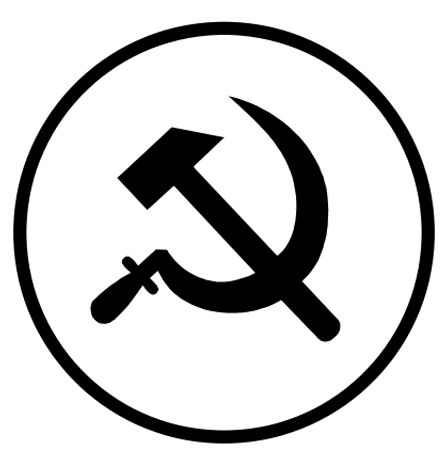

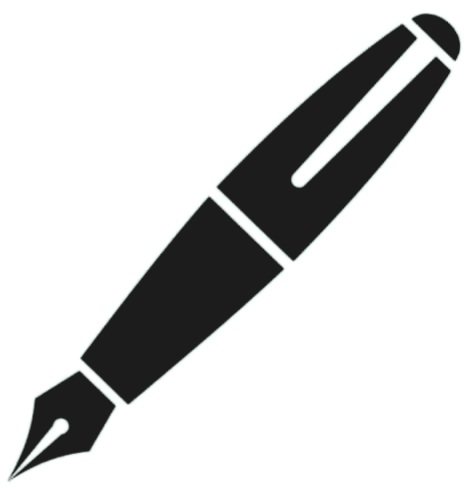

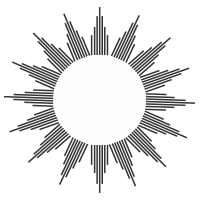

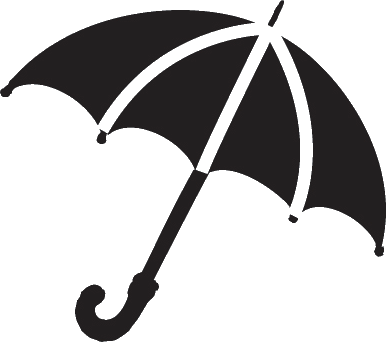

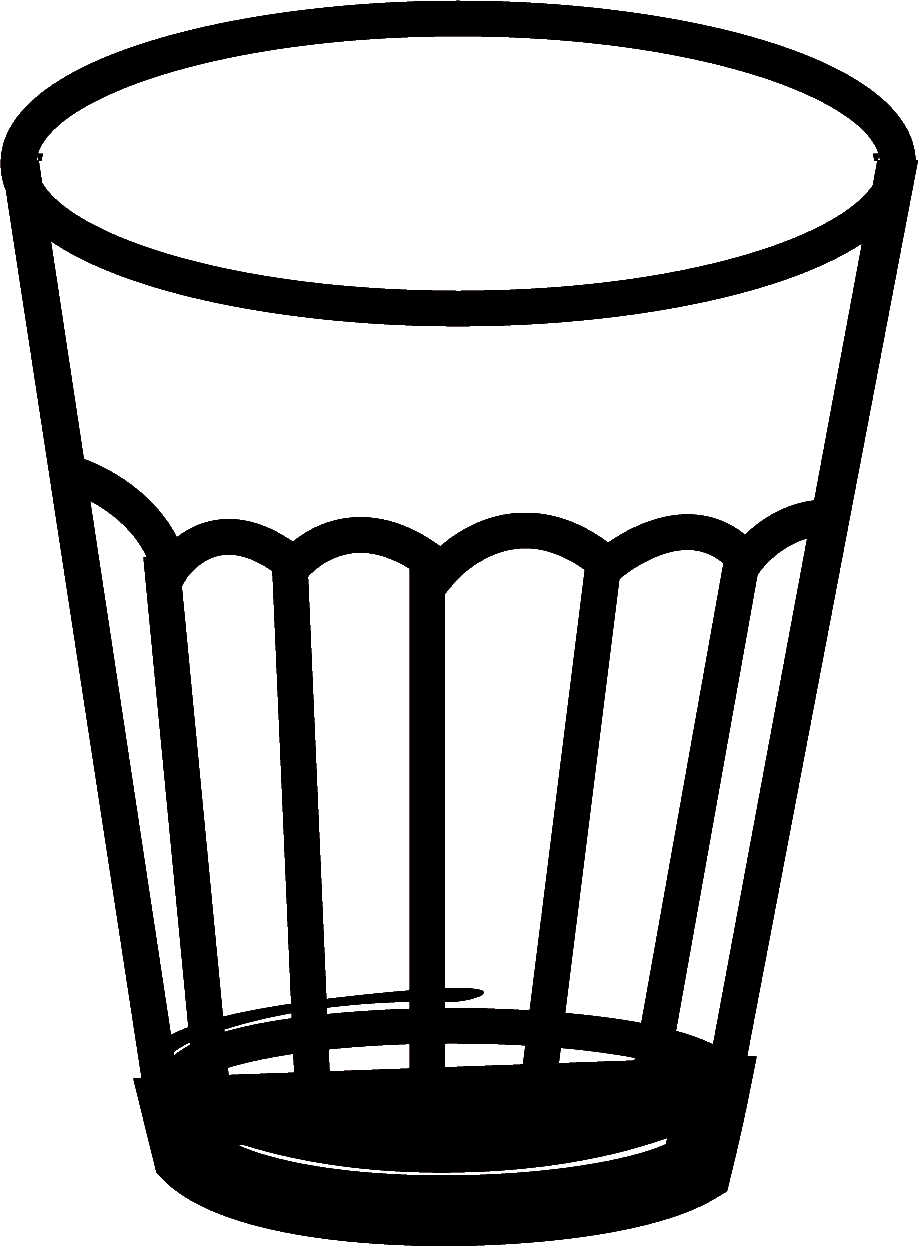
	First party	Second party	Third party
Party	Congress	Maoist Centre	Unified Socialist
Seats before	7	14	7
Seats won	6	5	5
Seats after	10	15	8
Seat change	▲3	▲1	▲1
	Fourth party	Fifth party	Sixth party
Party	CPN (UML)	PSP-Nepal	Janamorcha
Seats before	24	2	0
Seats won	1	1	1
Seats after	17	3	1
Seat change	▼7	▲1	▲1
Chairperson of the National Assembly before election
Ganesh Prasad Timilsina
CPN (UML)
Elected Chairperson of the National Assembly
Ganesh Prasad Timilsina
CPN (UML)

National Assembly elections were held in Nepal on 26 January 2022 in order to elect 19 of the 20 retiring Class II members of the National Assembly, the upper house of the Federal Parliament of Nepal. Members of the National Assembly are elected through indirect ballot and serve six year terms with one third of the members retiring every two years. However, the retiring members served only four year terms due to the entire house being elected in 2018 when a lottery was held to determine two, four and six-year term members.

== Electoral system ==
Eight members of the National Assembly are elected from each of the seven provinces of Nepal and 3 members are appointed by the President for a total of 59 members. Composition of members from each province have to include three women, a Dalit, and a disabled or member of a minority. The three remaining are categorized as open/other candidates. All members elected from this election must be from the same category as the retiring members.

Members were elected by first-past-the-post voting by an electoral college composed of members of the respective provincial assembly and Chairperson/Mayor and Vice Chairperson/Deputy Mayor of the local levels within the province. Each provincial assembly member vote has a weight of forty eight whereas each Chairperson/Mayor/Vice Chairperson/Deputy Mayor vote have a weight of eighteen. This electoral college will elect 19 members while 1 member, whose term will also end concurrently, will be nominated by the President on the recommendation of the Government of Nepal.

=== Qualification for members ===
According to Article 87 of the Constitution, a person who meets the following criteria is qualified to become a member of the National Assembly:

- citizen of Nepal,
- completed the age of thirty five years,
- not having been convicted of a criminal offense involving moral turpitude,
- not being disqualified by any Federal law, and
- not holding any office of profit.

Electors from Provinces of Nepal
Electors	Province No. 1	Madhesh	Bagmati	Gandaki	Lumbini	Karnali	Sudurpashchim	Total
Provincial Assembly	92	104	109	59	81	35	52	532
Local Level	272	268	237	170	215	156	175	1493
Total	364	372	346	229	296	191	227	2025

== Election Timeline ==
The key dates are listed below

19 November 2021	Cabinet announces election date
4 January 2022	Candidate nomination begins
9 January 2022	Nominations finalized and published
10 January 2022	Election code of conduct starts
26 January 2022	Election day – polling centers open 07:00 to 17:00
31 January 2022	Final result announced and presented to President
4 March 2021	Tenure of incumbent Class II members ends

== Alliance ==
=== Nepali Congress+ ===
No.	Party	Flag	Symbol	Leader	Photo	Seats Contested	Male Candidates	Female Candidates	Reference
1.	Nepali Congress			Sher Bahadur Deuba		6	4	2	
2.	Communist Party of Nepal (Maoist Centre)			Pushpa Kamal Dahal		5	4	1	
3.	Communist Party of Nepal (Unified Socialist)			Madhav Kumar Nepal		5	1	4	
4.	People's Socialist Party, Nepal			Upendra Yadav		2	2	0	
5.	Rastriya Janamorcha			Chitra Bahadur K.C.		1	1	0	

=== Communist Party of Nepal (Unified Marxist–Leninist) ===
No.	Party	Flag	Symbol	Leader	Photo	Seats Contested	Male Candidates	Female Candidates	Reference
1.	Communist Party of Nepal (Unified Marxist–Leninist)			KP Sharma Oli		19	12	7	

== Results ==
As the creation of the Nepal Communist Party was reverted by the Constitutional court, its 47 seats total in 2020 are shown here by the subsequent party of its members : CPN (UML), CPN (Maoist Centre) and CPN (US).

Results
Parties	Seats					
Parties	Total in 2020	Total before	Up	Won	Total after	+/-
CPN (UML)	0	24	8	1	17	▼7
CPN (Maoist Centre)	0	14	4	5	15	▲1
Nepali Congress	6	7	3	6	10	▲3
CPN (US)	0	7	4	5	8	▲1
People's Socialist Party	1	2	0	1	3	▲1
Loktantrik Samajbadi Party	0	1	0	0	1	0
Rastriya Janamorcha	0	0	0	1	1	▲1
Independent	0	1	0	0	1	0
Nominated	3	3	1	1	3	0
Nepal Communist Party (NCP)	47	0	0	-	0	0
Total	59	59	20	20	59	-

=== Detailed ===
Province	Category	MP before election	Party	MP after election	Party
Province No. 1	Open	Parshuram Megi Gurung	CPN (UML)	Gopal Basnet (Note: Won a lottery after both candidates tied with 4488 votes)	Nepali Congress
Province No. 1	Women	Nainakala Ojha	CPN (UML)	Jayanti Rai	CPN (Unified Socialist)
Province No. 1	Disabled/Minority	Aagam Prasad Bantawa Rai	CPN (UML)	Sonam Gyaljen Sherpa	CPN (UML)
Madhesh	Open	Suman Raj Pyakurel	CPN (UML)	Mohammad Khalid	PSP-N
Madhesh	Women	Shashikala Dahal	CPN (Maoist Centre)	Urmila Aryal	CPN (Maoist Centre)
Bagmati	Open	Radheshyam Adhikari	Nepali Congress	Krishna Prasad Paudel	Nepali Congress
Bagmati	Women	Udaya Sharma	CPN (Unified Socialist)	Goma Devi Timalsina	CPN (Unified Socialist)
Gandaki	Open	Dina Nath Sharma	CPN (Maoist Centre)	Suresh Ale Magar	CPN (Maoist Centre)
Gandaki	Women	Shanti Adhikari	CPN (Unified Socialist)	Kamala Panta	Nepali Congress
Gandaki	Dalit	Khim Bahadur BK	CPN (Maoist Centre)	Bhuwan Bahadur Sunar	CPN (Maoist Centre)
Lumbini	Open	Dirga Narayan Pandey	Nepali Congress	Yubaraj Sharma	Nepali Congress
Lumbini	Women	Komal Oli	CPN (UML)	Rajya Laxmi Gaire	CPN (Unified Socialist)
Lumbini	Dalit	Ram Lakhan Harijan	CPN (UML)	Tul Prasad B.K.	Rastriya Janamorcha
Karnali	Open	Thagendra Puri	CPN (Unified Socialist)	Udaya Bohara	CPN (Unified Socialist)
Karnali	Women	Kabita Bogati	CPN (UML)	Durga Gurung	Nepali Congress
Karnali	Disabled/Minority	Jeevan Budha	CPN (Maoist Centre)	Nara Bahadur Bista	CPN (Maoist Centre)
Sudurpashchim	Open	Sher Bahadur Kunwar	CPN (Unified Socialist)	Narayan Dutta Mishra	Nepali Congress
Sudurpashchim	Women	Tara Devi Joshi	Nepali Congress	Madan Kumari Shah	CPN (Unified Socialist)
Sudurpashchim	Dalit	Chakra Prasad Snehi	CPN (UML)	Jagat Parki	CPN (Maoist Centre)
	Nominated	Ram Narayan Bidari	CPN (Maoist Centre)	Narayan Dahal	CPN (Maoist Centre)

== See also ==
- 2022 elections in Nepal
