= Politics of Nepal =

- National Emblem of Nepal
- Polity type: Federal parliamentary republic
- Constitution: Constitution of Nepal

Legislative branch
- Name: Parliament
- Type: Bicameral
- Meeting place: Sansad Bhavan
- Upper house
- Name: Rastriya Sabha
- Presiding officer: Narayan Prasad Dahal, Chairman
- Appointer: Rastriya Sabha, sworn in by the President
- Lower house
- Name: Pratinidhi Sabha
- Presiding officer: Dol Prasad Aryal, Speaker of the Pratinidhi Sabha

Executive branch
- Head of state
- Title: President
- Currently: Ram Chandra Poudel
- Appointer: Electoral College
- Head of government
- Title: Prime Minister
- Currently: Balen Shah
- Appointer: President
- Cabinet
- Name: Council of Ministers of Nepal
- Current cabinet: Shah ministry
- Leader: Prime Minister
- Deputy leader: Deputy Prime Minister
- Appointer: President
- Headquarters: Singha Durbar, Kathmandu
- Ministries: 22

Judicial branch
- Name: Judiciary
- Supreme Court
- Chief judge: Manoj Kumar Sharma

The politics of Nepal functions within the framework of a parliamentary republic with a multi-party system. Executive power is exercised by the Prime Minister and their cabinet, while legislative power is vested in the Parliament. The country has a ceremonial president, who is indirectly elected by an electoral college comprising the Federal Parliament of Nepal and the provincial assemblies of each of Nepal's seven provinces, who themselves are all directly elected. The president is the head of state and commander-in-chief. The country also has a vice president. Between 1768 and 2008, the country was called the Kingdom of Nepal.

Modern Nepal was unified in 1768 by Prithvi Narayan Shah, who then established the Shah dynasty. The Kot massacre in 1846 led to over a century of Rana dynasty rule and largely relegated the Shah dynasty to a figurehead. After the 1951 Nepalese revolution, democracy was briefly introduced, but the Mahendra of Nepal replaced it with a party-less Panchayat system. After the 1990 Nepalese revolution, the country became a constitutional monarchy. Finally, after years of civil war and the 2001 royal massacre, the monarchy was abolished in 2008 under the Gyanendra of Nepal following the 2006 Nepalese revolution, with the country becoming a federal democratic republic. A new constitution was adopted in 2015. In 2017, Nepal held its first general election since the end of the civil war, in which the Nepal Communist Party (a short-lived merger of the UML and Maoist-Centre) won a majority at the federal level as well as in six of the seven provinces. Since the 1990s, politics in Nepal were dominated by the Communist Party of Nepal (Maoist Centre), the Communist Party of Nepal (Unified Marxist–Leninist), the Rastriya Prajatantra Party, and the Nepali Congress. The majority of Nepal's political parties espouse democratic socialism, while some are officially centrist and a few are centre-right. After the 2025 Nepalese Gen Z protests, Prime Minister K. P. Sharma Oli resigned, leading to demands for an interim government. Following consultations, Sushila Karki was selected as the interim Prime Minister, becoming the first woman in Nepal’s history to hold the position. At her request, President Ram Chandra Paudel dissolved the Parliament of Nepal, leading to the 2026 general election, which was won by the Rastriya Swatantra Party of former Kathmandu mayor Balen Shah.

The Economist Intelligence Unit rated Nepal a "hybrid regime" in 2022, while the 2018 Polity data series considers it to be a democracy. According to the 2023 V-Dem Democracy indices Nepal was the 7th most electorally democratic country in Asia.

== History ==
=== Dynasticism ===
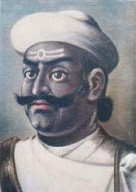
Damodar Pande, Mulkaji of Nepal from aristocratic Pande family (1799–1804)

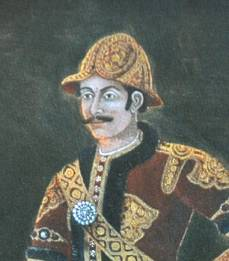
Bhimsen Thapa, Mukhtiyar of Nepal from aristocratic Thapa family (1806–1837)

The four noble families to be involved in the active politics of the Kingdom of Nepal before the rise of the Rana dynasty were the Shah dynasty, the Basnyat family, the Pande dynasty and the Thapa dynasty. At the end of 18th century, the Thapas and the Pandes had extreme dominance over Nepalese Darbar politics, alternatively contesting for central power with one another. Early politics in the Kingdom of Nepal was characterised by factionalism, conspiracies and murders, including two major massacres. (Note: See Kot massacre and Bhandarkhal massacre) After almost a century of power-wrangling among the Basnyat, Pande and Thapa families, the military leader Bir Narsingh Kunwar (Note: later known as Janga Bahadur Rana) emerged on top in the aftermath of the Kot massacre, and established the Rana dynasty in 1846, which consolidated powers of the king and prime minister and would reign for another century with a policy of oppression and isolationism.

=== 20th century ===
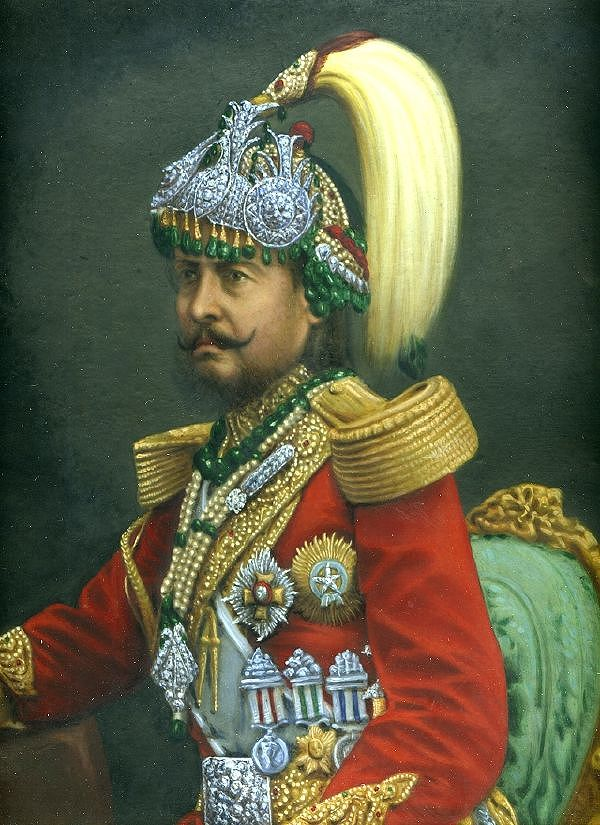
Jung Bahadur Rana, the first Rana era prime minister (1846–1856)

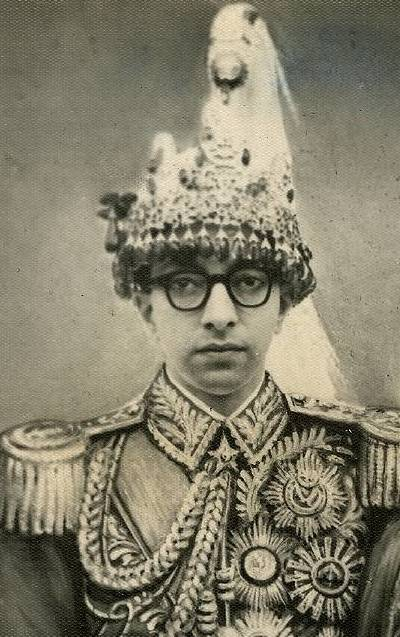
Mahendra of Nepal, the King and prime minister of Nepal who established the partyless Panchayat system

By the 1930s, Nepali expatriates in India had started smuggling in writings on political philosophies, which gave birth to a vibrant underground political movement in the capital, birthing Nepal Praja Parishad in 1939, which was dissolved only two years later, following the execution of the four great martyrs. Around the same time, Nepalis involved in the Indian Independence Movement began organising into political parties, leading to the birth of the Nepali Congress and the Communist Party of Nepal. Following Indian independence, Nepali Congress was successful in overthrowing the Rana regime with support from the Indian government and cooperation from the king. While communism was still trying to find its footing, Nepali Congress enjoyed overwhelming support of the electorate. Following a brief ten-year exercise in democracy, the autocratic Panchayat system was initiated, this time by the King, who deposed the democratically elected government of Nepali Congress, imprisoned or exiled prominent leaders and issued a ban on party politics.

Many political parties and their leaders remained underground or in exile for the next 30 years of "partyless" politics in Nepal. BP Koirala was released from prison in 1968 and went into exile in Benaras, returning in 1976 only to immediately be put in house arrest. Although an armed insurgency launched by the major communist faction called the Jhapa movement had failed comprehensively by 1971, it formed the foundation for the dominant communist power, CPN (ML), that was officially launched in 1978. A general referendum was held in 1980, which saw the CPN ML campaign for the option of multi-party democracy, along with Nepali Congress, but the Panchayat System was declared the winner to significant controversy. The Panchayat rule saw governments led by a group of monarchy loyalists taking turns, with Surya Bahadur Thapa, Tulsi Giri and Kirti Nidhi Bista becoming prime minister three times each, among others. It introduced a number of reforms, built infrastructures and modernised the country, while significantly curtailing political freedom, imposing the Nepali language and Khas culture to the oppression of all others, and spreading Indophobic propaganda, the effects of which are experienced to the present day.

In 1990, the joint civil resistance launched by the United Left front and Nepali Congress was successful in overthrowing the Panchayat, and the country became a constitutional monarchy. The United Left Front became CPN UML. The Panchayat loyalists formed National Democratic Party, which emerged as the third major party. While Nepali Congress ran the government for most of the next ten years of democracy that followed, democracy was mostly a disappointment owing to the immature democratic culture and political infighting in the capital, as well as the civil war that followed the guerrilla insurgency launched by the Maoist Party.

=== 21st century ===
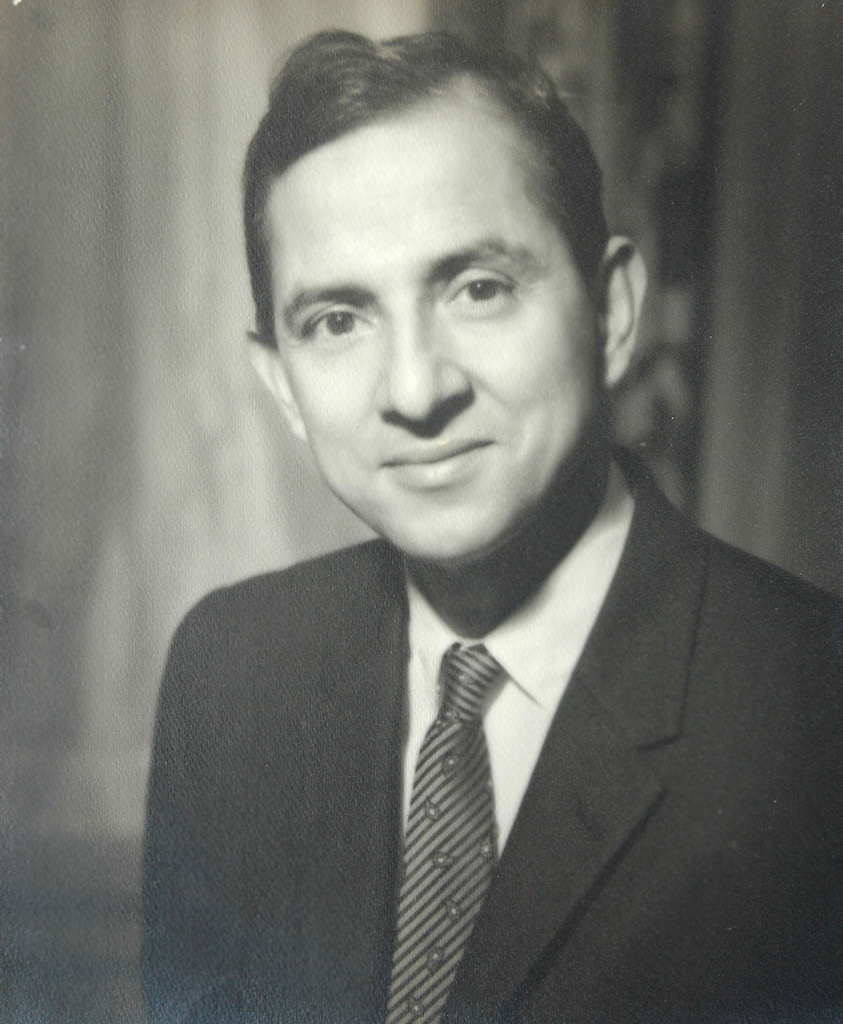
B. P. Koirala was the first democratically elected Prime Minister of Nepal.

Following a four-year autocratic rule by King Gyanendra that failed to defeat the Maoists, a mass civil protest was launched by a coalition of the Maoists and the political parties in 2006, which forced the king to step down, brought the Maoists to the peace process, and established a democratic republic by 2008.

Following the political consensus to draft the new constitution of the Republic via a constituent assembly, Nepali politics saw a rise in nationalist groups and ideologies. While the political power-wrangling caused continuous instability, maintaining the established average of nine months per government, this period saw two constituent assembly elections and the rise of Madhesi nationalist parties, especially in the Eastern Terai region. By 2015, the new constitution had been promulgated and Nepal became "a federal democratic republic striving towards democratic socialism". In 2017, a series of elections were held according to the new constitution, which established Nepal Communist Party (NCP) (formally united after the election) as the ruling party at the federal level as well as six of the seven provinces, Nepali Congress as the only significant opposition in federal and provincial levels, while the Madhesi coalition formed the provincial government in Province No. 2, but boasts negligible presence in the rest of the country. After the adoption of the new constitution, Nepalese politics were dominated by Pushpa Kamal Dahal, KP Sharma Oli, and Sher Bahadur Deuba, who all dominated House of Representatives elections between 2017 and 2026. In municipal politics, rapper Balen Shah became the first independent candidate to be elected mayor of Kathmandu in 2022.

In September 2025, a ban on numerous social media platforms was met by widespread protests that also came to be directed against corruption by ruling politicians. On the 9th of September, Oli resigned as the prime minister. Former chief justice Sushila Karki was sworn in as interim prime minister on 12 September, the first woman in the role. Nepal's 2026 general election was a major realignment, with Shah's Rastriya Swatantra Party surging and forming a majority government, a first in 1991. On 27 March 2026, Balendra Shah was sworn in as Nepal's prime minister.

== Federal Parliament ==
The Parliament of Nepal (Sansad) has two chambers: the House of Representatives (Pratinidhi Sabha) has 275 members elected for five-year term in single-seat constituencies. The National Assembly (Rashtriya Sabha) has 59 members, 8 from each state and the remaining 3 from the private concern of the government.

=== House of Representatives ===
Recent election results (2026): The Rastriya Swatantra Party won landslide victory with 182 seats under the Prime Ministerial candidate of Balendra Shah. The election was held after the September's country wide gen-z protest.

=== National Assembly ===
Current composition as of 2026:

Category	Name	Party	Assumed office	Class	Portfolio & Responsibilities
Koshi Province
Open	Sunil Bahadur Thapa	Congress	9 March 2026	1	
Open	Gopal Basnet	Congress	4 March 2022	2	
Open	Krishna Prasad Sitaula	Congress	4 March 2024	3	Parliamentary party leader of Nepali Congress
Women	Roshni Meche	CPN (UML)	9 March 2026	1	
Women	Jayanti Rai	NCP	4 March 2022	2	
Women	Rukmini Koirala	CPN (UML)	4 March 2024	3	
Dalit	Somannath Portel	CPN (UML)	9 March 2026	1	
With Disability or Ethnic Minority	Sonam Gyaljen Sherpa	CPN (UML)	4 March 2022	2	
Madhesh Province
Open	Mahantha Thakur	Loktantrik Samajwadi	9 March 2026	1	
Open	Mohammad Khalid	PSP-Nepal	4 March 2022	2	
Open	Ananda Prasad Dhungana	Congress	4 March 2024	3	
Women	Rekha Kumari Jha	CPN (UML)	9 March 2026	1	
Women	Urmila Aryal	NCP	4 March 2022	2	
Women	Pooja Chaudhary	PSP-Nepal	4 March 2024	3	
Dalit	Dharmendra Paswan	Congress	9 March 2026	1	
With Disability or Ethnic Minority	Ranjit Karna	Congress	9 March 2026	1	
Bagmati Province
Open	Prem Prasad Dangal	CPN (UML)	9 March 2026	1	
Open	Krishna Prasad Paudel	Congress	4 March 2022	2	
Open	Jit Jung Basnet	Congress	4 March 2024	3	
Women	Gita Devkota	Congress	9 March 2026	1	
Women	Goma Devi Timilsina	NCP	4 March 2022	2	
Women	Bishnu Devi Pudasaini	Congress	4 March 2024	3	
Dalit	Ghanashyam Rijal	NCP	4 March 2024	3	
With Disability or Ethnic Minority	Shrikrishna Adhikari	NCP	4 March 2024	3	
Gandaki Province
Open	Jagat Timilsina	Congress	9 March 2026	1	
Open	Suresh Ale Magar	NCP	4 March 2022	2	
Open	Kiran Babu Shrestha	Congress	4 March 2024	3	
Women	Samjhana Devkota	CPN (UML)	9 March 2026	1	
Women	Kamala Panta	Congress	4 March 2022	2	
Women	Manrupa Sharma	NCP	4 March 2024	3	
Dalit	Bhuwan Sunar	NCP	4 March 2022	2	
With Disability or Ethnic Minority	Padma Bahadur Pariyar	Congress	4 March 2024	3	
Lumbini Province
Open	Chandra Bahadur K.C.	Congress	9 March 2026	1	
Open	Yubaraj Sharma	Congress	4 March 2022	2	
Open	Jhakku Prasad Subedi	NCP	4 March 2024	3	
Women	Ram Kumari Jhakri	CPN (UML)	9 March 2026	1	
Women	Rajya Laxmi Gaire	NCP	4 March 2022	2	
Women	Vishnu Kumari Sapkota	Congress	4 March 2024	3	
Dalit	Tul Prasad Bishwakarma	Janamorcha	4 March 2022	2	
With Disability or Ethnic Minority	Basudev Ghimire	Congress	9 March 2026	1	
Karnali Province
Open	Lalit Jung Shahi	Congress	9 March 2026	1	
Open	Udaya Bohara	NCP	4 March 2022	2	
Open	Krishna Bahadur Rokaya	Congress	4 March 2024	3	
Women	Sumitra BC	CPN (UML)	9 March 2026	1	
Women	Meena Singh Rakhal	CPN (UML)	4 March 2022	2	
Women	Savitri Malla	NCP	4 March 2024	3	
Dalit	Bishnu BK	NCP	4 March 2024	3	
With Disability or Ethnic Minority	Nara Bahadur Bista	NCP	4 March 2022	2	
Sudurpashchim Province
Open	Khamma Bahadur Khati	Congress	9 March 2026	1	
Open	Narayan Dutta Mishra	Congress	4 March 2022	2	
Open				3	
Women	Lila Kumari Bhandari	CPN (UML)	9 March 2026	1	
Women	Madan Kumari Shah	NCP	4 March 2022	2	
Women	Renu Chand	NCP	4 March 2024	3	
Dalit	Jagat Parki	NCP	4 March 2022	2	
With Disability or Ethnic Minority	Narayan Bhatta	Congress	4 March 2024	3	
Nominated
				1	
	Narayan Dahal	NCP	12 April 2022	2	Chair of the National Assembly
	Anjan Shakya	CPN (UML)	18 April 2024	3	

== Judicial branch ==
The judiciary is composed of the Supreme Court (सर्बोच्च अदालत), appellate courts, and various district courts. The Chief Justice of the Supreme Court is appointed by the president on the recommendation of the Constitutional Council. The other judges are appointed by the president on the recommendation of the Judicial Council.

Nepal's judiciary is legally separate from the executive and legislative and has increasingly shown the will to be independent of political influence. The judiciary has the right of judicial review under the constitution.

== Different levels of governments ==
=== Federal government ===
The executive is headed by prime minister while president remains head of state. Nepal has provision for executive prime minister per the present Constitution of Nepal. The role of president is largely ceremonial as the functioning of the government is managed entirely by the prime minister who is appointed by the Parliament.

=== Provincial government ===
As per the Constitution of Nepal, there are 7 provinces in Nepal with their own provincial government and assemblies.

=== Municipal/local government ===
As per the Constitution of Nepal, there are 753 local levels, Rual municipalities and municipalities which are referred to as the village executive and municipal executive respectively. The district assembly is governed by the District Coordination Committee.

== International participation ==
The following is a list of international organisations that Nepal participates in: AsDB, MINA, CCC, Colombo Plan, ESCAP, FAO, Group of 77, IBRD, ICAO, ICFTU, ICRM, International Development Association, IFAD, International Finance Corporation, IFRCS, International Labour Organization, International Monetary Fund, International Maritime Organization, Intelsat, Interpol, IOC, IPC, IOM, International Organization for Standardization (correspondent), ITU, MONUC, Non-Aligned Movement, OPCW, SAARC, United Nations, UNCTAD, UNDP, UNESCO, UNIDO, UNIFIL, UNMIBH, UNMIK, UNMOP, UNMOT, UNTAET, UPU, World Federation of Trade Unions, WHO, WIPO, WMO, WToO, WTrO, CPC Nepal (applicant).

== See also ==
- Elections in Nepal
- Censorship in Nepal
