= List of National Assembly members from Koshi Province =

The National Assembly (Rastriya Sabha) is the Upper House of the Parliament of Nepal. Koshi Province elects 8 seats and they are indirectly elected by the an electoral college of each province of Koshi Province.

Out of the eight members from Koshi province, three must be women, one must be from the Dalit community, and one must be a disabled person or from a minority community. Each elector gets four ballots; one for the three open seats, one for the three female seats, one for the dalit seat and one for the disabled or minority seat. The three open and three female seats are filled by Single transferable vote, the two other seats by FPTP.

== Current Members ==
Keys: CPN (UML) (4) Congress (3) NCP (1)

Member	Party	Category	Date of appointment	Date of retirement
Sunil Bahadur Thapa	Congress	Open	9 March 2026	
Roshni Meche	CPN (UML)	Women	9 March 2026	
Somannath Portel	CPN (UML)	Dalit	9 March 2026	
Krishna Prasad Sitaula	Congress	Open	4 March 2024	
Rukmini Koirala	CPN (UML)	Women	4 March 2024	
Gopal Basnet	Congress	Open (Note: Succession of the four-year-term seat via the 2022 Nepalese National Assembly election)	4 March 2022	
Jayanti Rai	NCP	Women	4 March 2022	
Sonam Gyaljen Sherpa	CPN (UML)	Disability or Ethnic Minority	4 March 2022	

== Former Members ==
Member	Party	Category	Date of appointment	Date of retirement	Notes
Jit Jung Basnet	Congress	Open	4 March 2024		
Indira Gautam	NCP; CPN (UML)	Women (Note: Succession of the two-year-term seat via the 2020 Nepalese National Assembly election)	4 March 2020	3 March 2026	
Devendra Dahal	NCP; CPN (UML)	Open	4 March 2020	3 March 2026	Parliamentary party leader of CPN (UML)
Gopi Alchhami	NCP; CPN (MC)	Dalit	4 March 2020	3 March 2026	Chief Whip of CPN (Maoist Centre)
Ramesh Jung Rayamajhi	Congress	Open	4 March 2018	3 March 2024	Parliamentary Party leader for Nepali Congress (until 3 March 2024)
Bina Pokharel	NCP; CPN (MC)	Women	4 March 2018	3 March 2024	
Nainakala Ojha	NCP; CPN (UML)	Women	4 March 2018	3 March 2022	
Parshuram Megi Gurung	NCP; CPN (UML)	Open	4 March 2018	3 March 2022	
Aagam Prasad Bantawa Rai	NCP; CPN (UML)	Disability or Ethnic Minority	4 March 2018	3 March 2022	
Hari Charan Shiwakoti	NCP; CPN (UML)	Open	4 March 2018	3 March 2020	
Sarita Prasai	Congress	Women	4 March 2018	3 March 2020	
Khem Raj Nepali	NCP; CPN (UML)	Dalit	4 March 2018	3 March 2020	
