= Leader of the Ruling Party in the National Assembly (Nepal) =

Nepali office holder

Leader of the Ruling Party of the Rastriya Sabha
- राष्ट्रिय सभामा सत्ता पक्षको नेता
- Emblem of Nepal

- Flag of Nepal
- Incumbent; Krishna Prasad Sitaula since 15 July 2024
- Style: Honourable
- Status: Parliamentary Party Leader
- Member of: Members of Rastriya Sabha
- Appointer: Prime Minister
- Inaugural holder: Dina Nath Sharma
- Salary: रू 72,730

The Leader of the Ruling Party is an elected, non-ministerial member of the National Assembly who leads the official bloc in the upper house of the federal parliament, whether formed by a single party or a coalition.

This individual is designated or nominated by the Prime Minister to conduct government business on behalf of the ruling side. If the Prime Minister does not designate or nominate any member as the Leader of the Ruling Party, then a non-ministerial member of the parliamentary party of the ruling or major coalition parties is often seen as fulfilling this role in practice.

Although this office is not enshrined in the constitution, it is recognized and supported under the National Assembly Rules or the Remuneration and Benefits of Officers and Members of the Federal Parliament.

The current leader is Nepali Congress, Krishna Prasad Sitaula in office since 15 July 2024.

== List ==
Leaders of Ruling Party in the Rastriya Sabha
No.	Name	Party	Assumed office	Left office	Prime Minister
1	Dina Nath Sharma	Nepal Communist Party	30 Many 2018	26 March 2021	KP Sharma Oli
2	Suman Raj Pyakurel	CPN (Unified Marxist–Leninist)	26 March 2021	13 July 2021	KP Sharma Oli
3	Radheshyam Adhikari	Nepali Congress	13 July 2021	3 March 2022	Sher Bahadur Deuba
4	Ramesh Jung Rayamajhi	Nepali Congress	29 August 2022	25 December 2022	Sher Bahadur Deuba
5	Devendra Dahal	CPN (Unified Marxist–Leninist)	26 December 2022	27 February 2023	Pushpa Kamal Dahal
(4)	Ramesh Jung Rayamajhi	Nepali Congress	27 February 2023	4 March 2024	Pushpa Kamal Dahal
(5)	Devendra Dahal	CPN (Unified Marxist–Leninist)	4 March 2024	15 July 2024	Pushpa Kamal Dahal
6	Krishna Prasad Sitaula	Nepali Congress	15 July 2024	Incumbent	KP Sharma Oli
