= Kabindra Burlakoti =

General Secretary of the Rastriya Swatantra Party

The Honourable Kabindra Burlakoti
- कविन्द्र बुर्लाकोटी
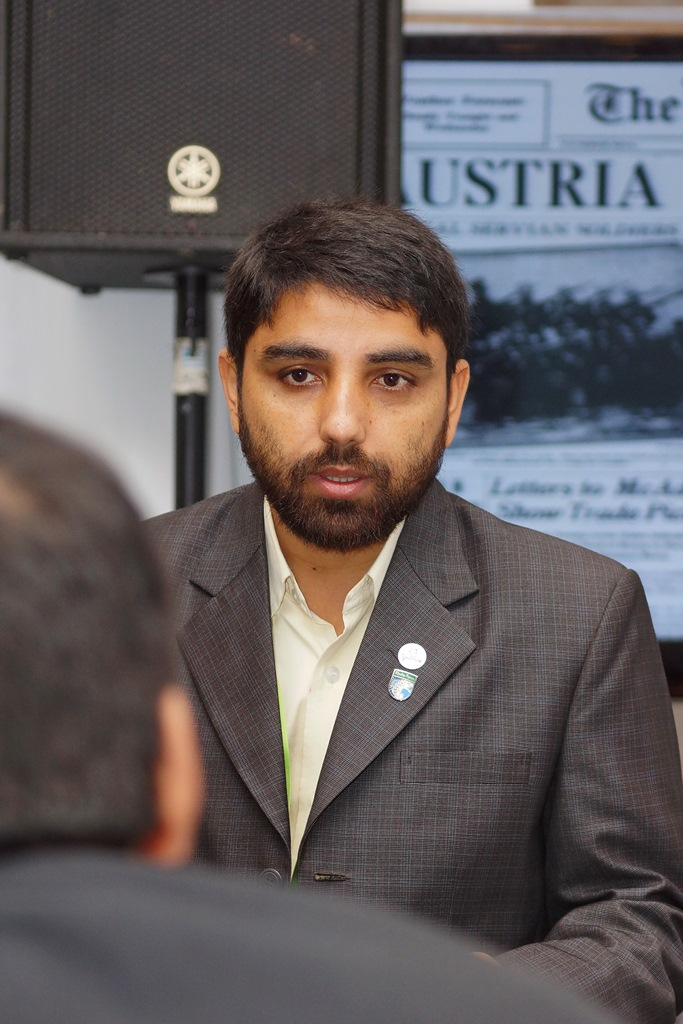
- Burlakoti in 2014

Member of Parliament, Pratinidhi Sabha
- Incumbent
- Assumed office 26 March 2026
- Preceded by: Pushpa Kamal Dahal
- Constituency: Gorkha 2

General Secretary of the Rastriya Swatantra Party
- In office July 2024 – 26 June 2026
- Preceded by: Mukul Dhakal
- Succeeded by: Bipin Kumar Acharya

Personal details
- Party: Rastriya Swatantra
- Profession: Politician

Kabindra Burlakoti (Note: Nepali: कविन्द्र बुर्लाकोटी) is a Nepalese politician serving as chief whip from the Rastriya Swatantra Party. He previously served as the party's gerneral secretary. He is the member of the 7th Pratinidhi Sabha elected from Gorkha 2 constituency in 2026 Nepalese General Election securing 26,660 votes and defeating Prakash Chandra Dawadi of the Nepali Congress He was previously contested from the same constituency during 2022 Nepalese General election and had been defeated with a huge margin from Maoist Centre leader Pushpa Kamal Dahal.

== Electoral Performance ==
Election	Year	Constituency	Contested for	Political party	Result	Votes	% of votes	Ref.
Nepal general election	2026	Gorkha 2	Pratinidhi Sabha member	Rastriya Swatantra Party	Won	26,660	49.24%	
