= Kamala Panta =

Nepali politician

Honourable Kamala Devi Pant
- कमला देवी पन्त

National Assembly Parliamentary Party Leader of Nepali Congress
- Incumbent
- Assumed office 29 April 2026
- Appointed by: Bhishma Raj Angdembe
- President: Ram Chandra Poudel
- Preceded by: Krishna Prasad Sitaula

Chairperson - Development, Economic Affairs and Good Governance Committee of National Assembly of Nepal
- In office 18 March 2024 – 18 March 2026
- Chairperson: Narayan Prasad Dahal
- Preceded by: Prakash Panth
- Succeeded by: Krishna Prasad Paudel

Member of the National Assembly of Nepal
- Incumbent
- Assumed office 4 March 2022
- President: Ram Chandra Poudel
- Category: Women
- Class: 2
- Preceded by: Shanti Adhikari
- Constituency: Gandaki Province

Member of the Constituent Assembly / Legislature Parliament
- In office 21 January 2014 – 14 October 2017
- PR group: Khas Arya (Women)
- Constituency: Nepali Congress PR list
- In office 4 July 2008 – 28 May 2012
- Constituency: Nominated by Cabinet

Minister of State for Women, Children and Senior Citizens
- In office 30 June 1999 – 26 July 2001
- Prime Minister: Krishna Prasad Bhattarai, Girija Prasad Koirala
- Preceded by: Mina Pandey
- Succeeded by: Sushila Swar

Assistant Minister for Women, Children and Senior Citizens
- In office 15 April 1998 – 26 August 1998
- Prime Minister: Girija Prasad Koirala
- Preceded by: Golchhe Sarki
- Succeeded by: Keshav Bahadur Chand

Member of Parliament, Pratinidhi Sabha
- In office 15 January 2007 – 18 January 2008
- Prime Minister: Girija Prasad Koirala
- Constituency: Gorkha 2
- In office 31 May 1999 – 21 May 2002
- Prime Minister: Krishna Prasad Bhattarai, Girija Prasad Koirala, Sher Bahadur Deuba
- Preceded by: herself
- Succeeded by: Baburam Bhattarai (as Member of the Constituent Assembly)
- Constituency: Gorkha 2

Member of House of Representatives
- In office 14 December 1994 – 15 January 1999
- Prime Minister: Girija Prasad Koirala
- Preceded by: Maya Devi Shrestha
- Succeeded by: herself
- Constituency: Gorkha 2

Personal details
- Born: Kamala Devi Pant; 30 September 1964 (age 62) Gabtar, Tanglichok, Gorkha
- Citizenship: Nepali
- Party: Nepali Congress
- Spouse: Madhu Prasad Acharya (m. 1996)
- Parents: Bhawani Prasad Pant (father); Harimaya Pant (mother)
- Education: Padma Kanya Campus, TU (Masters)

Kamala Devi Pant (Nepali: कमला देवी पन्त) is a Nepali politician affiliated with the Nepali Congress. She is a member of the National Assembly of Nepal representing Gandaki Province and a former Member of Parliament in the House of Representatives.

== Early life and background ==
Pant was born in Nepal and became politically active from a young age. She participated in pro-democracy movements during the Panchayat era, including the 1990 People's Movement, which led to the restoration of multiparty democracy in Nepal.

She has also been involved in organizational work related to women’s political participation and social development through party-affiliated networks.

== Political career ==
Pant is a member of the Nepali Congress and has had a long parliamentary career.

She was first elected to the House of Representatives from the Gorkha 2 constituency in the 1994 general election. She was re-elected from the same constituency in the 1999 general election, securing 11,544 votes and defeating her closest rival from the Communist Party of Nepal (Unified Marxist–Leninist).

She served as Assistant Minister and later Minister of State for Women, Children and Senior Citizens between 1998 and 2001.

Pant was a nominated member of the 1st Nepalese Constituent Assembly from 2008 to 2012.

Following her tenure in the lower house, Pant remained active in national politics within the Nepali Congress.

== National Assembly ==
Pant was elected to the National Assembly (Rastriya Sabha) in 2022 under the women’s category from Gandaki Province.

She has participated in parliamentary debates and legislative discussions on governance, development planning, and economic policy.

She has served as the Parliamentary Party Leader of the Nepali Congress in the National Assembly since 29 April 2026.

== Committee leadership ==
Pant served as chairperson of the Development, Economic Affairs and Good Governance Committee of the National Assembly between March 2024 and March 2026.

In this role, she has emphasized good governance, anti-corruption measures, and strengthening institutional accountability.

== Policy positions and advocacy ==
Pant has been involved in policy discussions on sustainable development and climate change. She has supported integrating traditional and indigenous knowledge into climate adaptation strategies.

She has also been associated with efforts to promote women's rights and gender inclusion in Nepal's constitutional and political processes.

== Public engagement ==
Pant has participated in parliamentary outreach and public policy discussions related to development, governance, and economic reform.

== See also ==
- Gorkha 2
- National Assembly of Nepal
- Nepali Congress
