= Bhuwan Bahadur Sunar =

Nepalese politician

- भुवन बहादुर सुनार

Memberof Communist Party of Nepal (Maoist Centre)
- Incumbent
- Assumed office 23 September 2021
- Preceded by: Position created

Member of Rastriya Sabha
- Incumbent
- Assumed office 2022
- Prime Minister: Sher Bahadur Deuba

Personal details
- Party: Communist Party of Nepal (Maoist Centre)

Bhuwan Bahadur Sunar is a Nepalese politician and member of Communist Party of Nepal (Maoist Centre). He is also member of Rastriya Sabha and was elected from 2022 Nepalese National Assembly election.
