= Gorkha 2 =

Parliamentary constituency in Gandaki Province, Nepal

- Parliamentary constituency for the House of Representatives
- Gorkha 2 in Gandaki Province

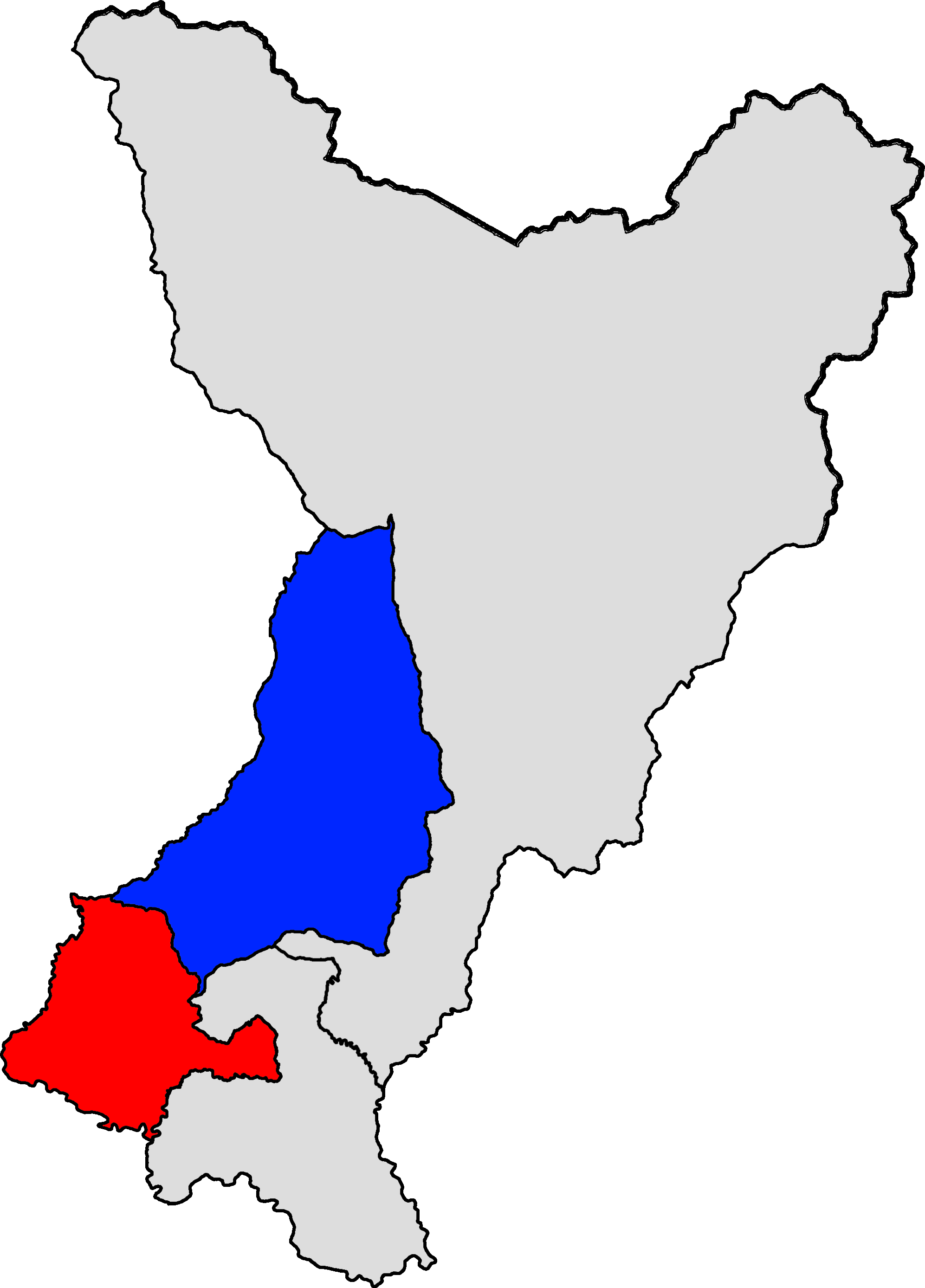
- Assembly segments Gorkha 2(A) and Gorkha 2(B) within Gorkha District
- Province: Gandaki Province
- District: Gorkha District
- Electorate: 90,826

Current constituency
- Created: 1991
- MP: Kabindra Burlakoti (Rastriya Swatantra Party)
- Gandaki MPA 2(A): Hari Sharan Acharya (SPN)
- Gandaki MPA 2(B): Surendra Raj Pandey (NC)

Gorkha 2 one of two parliamentary constituencies of Gorkha District in Nepal. This constituency came into existence on the Constituency Delimitation Commission (CDC) report submitted on 31 August 2017.

== Incorporated areas ==
Gorkha 2 incorporates Ajirkot Rural Municipality, Siranchok Rural Municipality, Barpak Sulikot Rural Municipality ,Palungtar Municipality and wards 8–14 of Gorkha Municipality.

== Assembly segments ==
It encompasses the following Gandaki Provincial Assembly segment

- Gorkha 2(A)
- Gorkha 2(B)

== Members of Parliament ==
=== Parliament/Constituent Assembly ===
Election	Member	Party
1991	Maya Devi Shrestha	Nepali Congress
1994	Kamala Panta	Nepali Congress
2008	Baburam Bhattarai	CPN (Maoist)
January 2009	Baburam Bhattarai	UCPN (Maoist)
2013	Hit Raj Pandey	UCPN (Maoist)
May 2016	Hit Raj Pandey	CPN (Maoist Centre)
2017	Baburam Bhattarai	Naya Shakti Party, Nepal
May 2019	Baburam Bhattarai	Samajbadi Party, Nepal
April 2020	Baburam Bhattarai	People's Socialist Party, Nepal
August 2022	Baburam Bhattarai	Nepal Socialist Party
2022	Pushpa Kamal Dahal	CPN (Maoist Centre)
2026	Kabindra Burlakoti	Rastriya Swatantra Party

=== Provincial Assembly ===
==== 2(A) ====
Election	Member	Party
2017	Hari Sharan Acharya	Naya Shakti Party, Nepal
May 2019	Hari Sharan Acharya	Samajbadi Party, Nepal
April 2020	Hari Sharan Acharya	People's Socialist Party, Nepal
August 2022	Hari Sharan Acharya	Nepal Socialist Party

==== 2(B) ====
Election	Member	Party
2017	Prakash Chandra Dawadi	Nepali Congress

== Election results ==
=== Election in the 2020s ===
==== 2026 general election ====
Candidate	Party	Votes	%
Kabindra Burlakoti	Rastriya Swatantra Party	26,660	49.24
Prakash Chandra Dawadi	Nepali Congress	11,700	21.61
Lekhnath Neupane	Nepali Communist Party	11,073	20.45
Milan Gurung	CPN (UML)	3,087	5.70
Balaram Tamang	Ujyalo Nepal Party	639	1.18
Others	Others	988	1.82
Total		54,147	100.00
Majority		14,960	
Rastriya Swatantra Party gain			

==== 2022 general election ====
Candidate	Party	Votes	%
Pushpa Kamal Dahal	CPN (Maoist Centre)	26,109	51.28
Kabindra Burlakoti	Rastriya Swatantra Party	12,639	24.82
Abdus Salam Miya	CPN (UML)	7,395	14.52
Sushil Pant	Rastriya Prajatantra Party	1,813	3.56
Som Bahadur Gurung	Mongol National Organisation	1,164	2.29
Others		1,798	3.53
Total		50,918	100.00
Majority		13,470	
CPN (Maoist Centre) gain			

==== 2022 provincial election ====
===== 2(A) =====
Candidate	Party	Votes	%
Fanindra Devkota	Nepal Socialist Party	12,418	49.11
Raju Rana	CPN (UML)	5,416	21.42
Rajendra Shah	Rastriya Prajatantra Party	3,458	13.68
Saroj Giri	Hamro Nepali Party	2,408	9.52
Bil Bahadur Tamang Lama	Independent	1,023	4.05
Others	562	2.22	
Total		25,285	100.00
Majority		7,002	
Nepal Socialist Party			

===== 2(B) =====
Candidate	Party	Votes	%
Surendra Raj Pandey	Nepali Congress	16,887	64.57
Basanta Kumar Gurung	CPN (UML)	5,370	20.53
Ram Bahadur Ghale	Mongol National Organisation	1,482	5.67
Hari Pokharel	Independent	1,367	5.23
Thakur Prasad Lamichhane	Rastriya Prajatantra Party	869	3.32
Others	177	0.68	
Total		26,152	100.00
Majority		11,517	
Nepali Congress			

=== Election in the 2010s ===
==== 2017 legislative elections ====
Party	Candidate	Votes
Naya Shakti Party, Nepal	Dr. Baburam Bhattarai	31,807
CPN (Maoist Centre)	Narayan Kaji Shrestha	24,933
Others		739
Invalid votes		2,636
Result	Naya Shakti gain	
Source: Election Commission

==== 2017 Nepalese provincial elections ====
===== 2(A) =====
Party	Candidate	Votes
Naya Shakti Party, Nepal	Hari Sharan Acharya	15,343
CPN (Maoist Centre)	Kamala Naharki	12,065
Others		651
Invalid votes		1,067
Result	Naya Shakti gain	
Source: Election Commission

===== 2(B) =====
Party	Candidate	Votes
Nepali Congress	Prakash Chandra Dawadi	15,853
CPN (Maoist Centre)	Amar Bahadur Gurung Tamu	13,411
Others		621
Invalid votes		1,075
Result	Congress gain	
Source: Election Commission

==== 2013 Constituent Assembly election ====
Party	Candidate	Votes
UCPN (Maoist)	Hit Raj Pandey	20,761
Nepali Congress	Rabikala Sharma Neupane	7,929
CPN (Unified Marxist–Leninist)	Baburam Adhikari	3,431
Others		1,178
Result	Maoist hold	
Source: NepalNews

=== Election in the 2000s ===
==== 2008 Constituent Assembly election ====
Party	Candidate	Votes
CPN (Maoist)	Dr. Baburam Bhattarai	46,272
Nepali Congress	Chandra Prasad Neupane	6,143
CPN (Unified Marxist–Leninist)	Hari Prasad Kale	2,083
Rastriya Prajatantra Party	Indra Bahadur Gurung	1,185
Others		794
Invalid votes		1,428
Result	Maoist gain	
Source: Election Commission

=== Election in the 1990s ===
Candidate	Party	Votes	%
Kamala Panta	Nepali Congress	11,544	30.75
Prem Bahadur Gurung	CPN (UML)	11,131	29.65
Indra Bahadur Gurung	Rastriya Prajatantra Party	6,689	17.82
Rajeshwar Devkota	Rastriya Prajatantra Party (Chand)	5,852	15.59
Dil Bahadur Gurung	CPN (Marxist–Leninist)	1,295	3.45
Tilak Bahadur Nepali	Nepal Dalit Shramik Morcha	308	0.82
Krishna Bahadur Gurung	Rastriya Janamukti Party	211	0.56
Hom Bahadur Rana	Independent	197	0.52
Ram Bahadur Dhakal	Rastriya Janamorcha	180	0.48
Thaneshwor Devkota	Independent	81	0.22
Tika Dutt Ghimire	Rastriya Janata Parishad	58	0.15
Total		37,546	100.00
Valid votes		37,546	95.99
Invalid/blank votes		1,568	4.01
Total votes		39,114	100.00
Registered voters/turnout		66,500	58.82
Majority		413	
Nepali Congress hold			

==== 1994 legislative elections ====
Party	Candidate	Votes
Nepali Congress	Kamala Panta	8,197
Rastriya Prajatantra Party	Rajeshwar Devkota	6,862
Independent	Indra Bahadur Gurung	6,561
CPN (Unified Marxist–Leninist)	Bachaspati Devkota	4,957
Independent	Chandra Nath Kandel	3,652
Others		828
Result	Congress hold	
Source: Election Commission

==== 1991 legislative elections ====
Party	Candidate	Votes
Nepali Congress	Maya Devi Shrestha	15,269
Samyukta Jana Morcha Nepal	Suresh Wagle	13,687
Result	Congress gain	

== See also ==
- List of parliamentary constituencies of Nepal
