= Nar Bahadur Chand =

Nepali politician

- नर बहादुर चन्द

Member of the Constituent Assembly
- In office 21 January 2014 – 14 October 2017
- Preceded by: Renu Chand
- Succeeded by: Constituency abolished
- Constituency: Baitadi 2

Personal details
- Born: 29 August 1962 (age 63) Dasharathchand–6, Simail, Baitadi
- Citizenship: Nepali
- Party: Nepali Congress
- Spouse: Manmati Chand
- Children: Ashok Chand; Saroj Chand; Kalpana Chand
- Parents: Gauri Chand; Gaura Chand
- Occupation: Registered Auditor

Nar Bahadur Chand (Nepali: नर बहादुर चन्द) is a member of 2nd Nepalese Constituent Assembly. He won Baitadi–2 seat in CA assembly, 2013 from Nepali Congress.
