= Nanda Sharma =

Nepali politician

Honourable Nanda Sharma
- नन्दा शर्मा

Minister of state for Physical Infrastructure and Transport
- Incumbent
- Assumed office 16 April 2023
- President: Ram Chandra Paudel
- Prime Minister: Pushpa Kamal Dahal
- Vice President: Ram Sahaya Yadav

Member of Rastriya Sabha
- Incumbent
- Assumed office 2018
- Prime Minister: Sher Bahadur Deuba
- Preceded by: Position created
- Constituency: Karnali Province

Personal details
- Party: CPN (Unified Socialist)

Nanda Sharma (Nepali: नन्दा शर्मा) is a Nepali politician belonging to CPN (Unified Socialist). She is the current Minister of state for Physical Infrastructure and Transport.

Sharma is also member of Rastriya Sabha and was elected from 2018 Nepalese National Assembly election.
