= Indu Kadariya =

Nepali politician

- इन्दु कडरिया

Member of the National Assembly for Sudurpashchim Province
- Incumbent
- Assumed office 2018

Personal details
- Party: Communist Party of Nepal (Unified Marxist–Leninist)

Indu Kadariya (Nepali: इन्दु कडरिया) is a Nepalese politician who has served since 2018 as a Communist Party of Nepal (Unified Marxist–Leninist) (CPN (UML)) member of the National Assembly for one of Sudurpashchim Province's reserved women seats.

== Biography ==
In the 2018 Nepalese National Assembly election, Kadariya was elected as a Communist Party of Nepal (Unified Marxist–Leninist) (member of the National Assembly, running unopposed for one of the Province No. 7 (now Sudurpashchim Province) women seats. In June 2018, her term was extended to last for six years as part of a draw conducted by the Federal Parliament Secretariat, allowing her to skip re-election in 2022. In August 2018, she was made a member of the Sustainable Development and Good Governance Committee.

In May 2020, during a parliamentary debate concerning the extension of an Indian-built road into Nepal-claimed territory within Lipulekh Pass, Kadariya voiced her support of fortifying the India–Nepal border with fences, even offering an annual salary to support such a project. In July 2021, she said that the early decision to dissolve the House of Representatives was due to issues with perceived greed amongst the leadership. In November 2021, she was an Open Women Category member of the closed session of the CPN (UML)'s 10th National General Convention. In March 2023, she was part of Dev Raj Ghimire's delegation to the 146th Inter-Parliamentary Union Assembly in Bahrain. In June 2023, she criticized the National Assembly's 2023-24 budget as "without source" and as lacking focus on solutions.
