= Prakash Chandra Dawadi =

Nepalese politician

Honourable Prakash Chandra Dawadi
- प्रकाश चन्द्र दवाडी

Province Assembly Member of Gandaki Province
- In office 2017–2022
- Preceded by: Assembly Created
- Succeeded by: Surendra Raj Pandey
- Constituency: Gorkha 2 (B)

Personal details
- Party: Nepali Congress
- Occupation: Politician

Prakash Chandra Dawadi (Nepali: प्रकाश चन्द्र दवाडी) is a Nepalese politician from Nepali Congress. Dawadi is a resident of Gorkha, who is elected member of Provincial Assembly of Gandaki Province from Gorkha 2(B) defeating left alliance candidate with a huge margin.

== Electoral history ==
=== 2017 Nepalese provincial elections ===
==== Gorkha 2(B) ====
Candidate	Party	Votes	%
Surendra Raj Pandey	Nepali Congress	16,887	64.57
Basanta Kumar Gurung	CPN (UML)	5,370	20.53
Ram Bahadur Ghale	Mongol National Organisation	1,482	5.67
Hari Pokharel	Independent	1,367	5.23
Thakur Prasad Lamichhane	Rastriya Prajatantra Party	869	3.32
Others	177	0.68	
Total		26,152	100.00
Majority		11,517	
Nepali Congress			

== See also ==
- Gagan Thapa
