= Badri Pandey =

Nepalese songwriter

- Born: 4 March 1980 (age 45); Nuwakot District, Nepal
- Genres: Flimi, Romantic, Ghazal, Lok Pop, Sentimental
- Occupations: Lyricist, Composer, and Producer
- Years active: From 2001
- Labels: Music Plus, Music Nepal, OSR Digital

Badri Pandey (Nepali: बद्री पाण्डे) is a Nepali songwriter, producer, and music composer. He is also known as B. Pandey, a lyricist of the Nepali music industry. He has written over 150 songs across various genres, starting his career in 2001 with "Shankha Nagara," voiced by Rajesh Payal Rai and Binaya Niroula. He was born on 4 March 1980 in Nuwakot District of Nepal.

== Career ==
Pandey wrote and recorded "Shankha Nagara" in the voice of Rajesh Payal Rai and Binaya Niroula in 2001 after he came to Kathmandu on completion of his high school. Instantly he was given opportunities to write new songs for movies.

He was given the opportunity to write songs for the album Pancha Ratna. Pancha Ratna was considered a music jewel for its uniqueness. It also marked the debut of Pancha Ratna Music and Melody in the Nepalese music industry. It was a unique album in the sense that it contained a set of four audio CDs and a VCD. Each audio CD contained 8 songs while the VCD contained music videos of the eight most loved songs by the audience. Pandey's 'My Hundred Songs', a poetic anthology has been published in 2022. He has included 100 different lyrics on different themes in his first anthology.

Of the 32 songs in Pancha Ratna, Chandra Dong wrote three songs, Buddhabir Lama wrote two, and Sangeeta Rai and Ram Kumar Adhikari had a song each to their credit. The rest of the 25 songs were written by B. Pandey.

The music composer in the album included Pravin Baraily, Suresh Adhikari, Narendra Pyasi, Chandra Dong, Uday Sotang, Raju Singh, Raj Sagar, Shishir Yogi, Deep Chandra Moktan, and Chitra Lal Sharma.

Likewise, The singers are Ram Krishna Dhakal, Jagadis Samal, Shailesh Singh, Madavi Tripath, Anju Panta, Narendra Pyasi, Thupten Bhutiya, Reema Gurung, Suresh Manandhar, Anjana, Uday, and Manila Sotang, Purna Pariyar, Manoj Rai, Ram Kumar Adhikari, Sangeeta Rai, Swaroop Raj Acharya, Deepak Limbu, Shishir Yogi, Rajesh Payal Rai, and Mani Kumar Rai.

After the success of Pancha Ratna, Pandey wrote songs for various movies. In 2018, he was given the opportunity to write a song for the Prasad movie. He wrote, "Banki Chari" which was a massive hit. He was able to bag the best lyricist of the year award with this song. Aside from this, Pandey has been contributing to Nepali Music Industry as the chairman of the Music Producer Association of Nepal since 10 November 2019. Pandey was also appointed as General Secretary of Music Royalty Collection Society of Nepal (MRCSN) after the general meeting held on 22 September 2021.

He has been felicitated with dozens of honors, prizes and awards for being the song writing. He has received the 8th Bindabasini Music Award - 2017, as a good songwriter. 7th National Rapti Music Award -2019 (Best Film Songwriter), Genius Music Award-2018 (Best Film Songwriter), Sagarmatha Music Award 2019 (Best Songwriter), National Brand Music Award 2020 (Best Film Songwriter), National Personality and Creator Honor 2021, National Songwriter Honor 2022, Senior Creator Honor 2022, Jayaprapti Kala Samman 2022 Including them he received Nepal Music and Fashion Award-2022 (Best Modern Songwriter), 13th Bindabasini Music Award (Best Lyricist) and has acted as a skilled judge in many competitions of music. The book written by Pandey My Hundred Songs has been published on 2022, which was released by famous screenwriter, lyricist and poet Javed Akhtar of Bollywood film industry. This book garnered buzz as a canvas of love.

Lyricist B. Pandey received Nepal's highest civilian award 'Jansewa Shree Medal' from the Rt. Honorable President of Nepal Ram Chandra Poudel on 14 April 2023.

== Awards and recognition ==
SN	Award Title	Award Category	Notable work	Result
1	7th Rashtriya Rapti Music Award -2018 AD	Best Movie Song Lyricist	Banki Chari - movie Prasad	Won
2	Genius Music Award - 2018 AD	Best Lyricist of the year	Banki Chari - moviePrasad	Won
3	Sagarmatha Music Awards - 2019 AD	Best Movie Song Lyricist	Banki Chari - movie Prasad	Won
4	National Brand Music Award - 2020 AD	Best Movie Song Lyricist	Jali Rumal - movie Selfi King	Won
5	11th Bindabasini Music Award- 2020 AD	Best Lyricist of the year (Jury Award)	Pahile Dil	Won
6	3rd Nepal Music & Fashion Awards - 2022 AD	Best Lyricist of the Year	Dhan Bir	Won
7	13th Bindabasini Music Award - 2022	Best Lyricist of the Year	Jhumke Bulaki	Won
