= Mukta Kumari Yadav =

Nepali politician

- मुक्ता कुमारी यादव

Joint General Secretary of Nepali Congress
- Incumbent
- Assumed office 16 January 2026
- President: Gagan Thapa
- Preceded by: Mahendra Yadav

Member of the House of Representatives
- In office 22 December 2022 – 12 September 2025
- President: Ram Chandra Poudel
- Prime Minister: Pushpa Kamal Dahal; KP Sharma Oli
- PR group: Madheshi (Women)
- Constituency: Nepali Congress PR list

Member of the National Assembly of Nepal
- In office 3 March 2018 – 3 March 2020
- President: Bidya Devi Bhandari
- Prime Minister: KP Sharma Oli
- Category: Women
- Class: I
- Preceded by: Position Established
- Succeeded by: Tulsa Dahal
- Constituency: Madhesh Province

Personal details
- Born: 29 August 1977 (age 48) Balabakhar, Shahidnagar, Dhanusha, Nepal
- Party: Nepali Congress

Mukta Kumari Yadav (Nepali: मुक्ता कुमारी यादव; born 29 August 1977) is a Nepali politician affiliated with the Nepali Congress who also serves as a Member of the Pratinidhi Sabha, the lower house of the Federal Parliament of Nepal. She is also a former member of the Rastriya Sabha and was elected under women's category.

She was elected central committee member of Nepali Congress with highest vote from the 14th general convention of Nepali Congress.
