= Khim Lal Devkota =

Nepali politician, Senior Advocate

Khimlal Devkota (Nepali: खिमलाल देवकोटा) is a Nepali politician belonging to Communist Party of Nepal (Unified Socialist) and a Senior Advocate. Previously Devkota was party spokesman for the Naya Shakti Party in Nepal.

== Education and career ==
Devkota was educated at Tribhuvan University and has a bachelor's degree in law and two master's degrees in Political Science and Sociology/Anthropology, respectively. He was a practicing lawyer at the Supreme Court of Nepal from 1990 to 2005. In 2006, he became a member of the Interim Constitution Drafting Committee and then the Interim Legislature Parliament of Nepal.

== Political life ==
In 2008, he became a member of the Constituent Assembly of Nepal and, in 2009, a member of the Constitutional Committee of Nepal. Here, he acted as a drafting committee member and contributed as a member of the Taskforce for High Level Political Mechanisms. Devkota was the Chairperson of the National Intellectuals Organization of Nepal until 2015.

After the Supreme Court decision on the Nepal Communist Party, the party was divided into two, UML and Maoist Center. Devkota is a Central Committee Member of the Communist-Party-of-Nepal-Maoist-Centre in the position of Head of the Election Department. He was a former leader in the Communist Party of Nepal (Maoist).

Devkota is currently a senior advocate for the Supreme Court of Nepal from his role as legal and constitutional adviser at Swabhiman Law Firm and Consultancy.

== Books ==
Devkota has written books related to law and constitution. He is a professor at the Institute of Crisis Management Studies affiliated with Tribhuvan University.
