= Pramila Kumari =

Nepali politician

Honourable Pramila Kumari
- प्रमिला कुमारी

Minister of state for Education, Science and Technology
- Incumbent
- Assumed office 24 May 2023
- President: Ram Chandra Paudel
- Prime Minister: Pushpa Kamal Dahal
- Vice President: Ram Sahaya Yadav

Member of Rastriya Sabha
- Incumbent
- Assumed office 2017
- Prime Minister: Sher Bahadur Deuba
- Constituency: Madhesh Province

Personal details
- Party: People's Socialist Party, Nepal

Pramila Kumari (Nepali: प्रमिला कुमारी) is a Nepali politician belonging to People's Socialist Party, Nepal. She is also a member of Rastriya Sabha and was elected in the open category.
