= Golchhe Sarki =

Nepali politician

Personal details
- Died: December 29, 2006
- Party: CPN UML

Golchhe Sarki was a Nepalese politician, hailing from the Dalit community. In 1988, the Utpidit Jatiya Utthan Manch was formed with Sarki as its president. In the 1991 election, he was elected to the Pratinidhi Sabha as the candidate of the Communist Party of Nepal (Unified Marxist-Leninist). During his tenure as MP, he became famous for attacking the minister Ram Chandra Poudel with his shoe in the assembly.

In 1992, Sarki was reelected as president of the Utpidit Jatiya Utthan Manch.

When the CPN(UML) was divided in 1998, Sarki joined the Communist Party of Nepal (ML). He rejoined CPN(UML) in 2002, as the two parties reunified.

Golchhe supported the royal takeover on February 1, 2005. As a consequence, he was expelled from the party on March 14, 2005. In July 2005, he was appointed Assistant Minister for Transport Management by King Gyanendra. Golchhe commented his appointment by saying that "My nomination is an honour for the whole Dalit society". In December 2005, as the cabinet was reshuffled, he was appointed Assistant Minister for Women, Children and Social Welfare.

Golchhe died on December 29, 2006.
