= Ramesh Jung Rayamajhi =

Nepali politician

Honourable Ramesh Jung Rayamajhi
- रमेश जंग रायमाझी

Member of National Assembly
- In office 4 March 2018 – 4 March 2024
- Succeeded by: Krishna Prasad Sitaula
- Prime Minister: Sher Bahadur Deuba

Personal details
- Party: Nepali Congress

Ramesh Jung Rayamajhi (Nepali: रमेश जंग रायमाझी) is a Nepalese politician belonging to Nepali Congress. He was a member of Rastriya Sabha and served as leader of parliamentary party in the house. He is the Vice-president of Nepali Congress, Koshi Pradesh Committee. He belongs to Sundarharaicha Municipality ward no 3, Gacchiya. He is also candidate for Constitutional Member in Morang area-8 held on 2068.

== See also ==
- Nepali Congress
