= Jitendra Narayan Dev =

Nepali politician

- जितेन्द्र नारायण देव

Member of Rastriya Sabha
- In office 4 March 2018 – 4 March 2024
- Prime Minister: KP Sharma Oli
- Succeeded by: Ananda Prasad Dhungana
- Constituency: Madhesh Province

Minister for Culture, Tourism and Civil Aviation
- In office 26 July 2017 – 15 February 2017
- President: Bidhya Devi Bhandari
- Prime Minister: Sher Bahadur Deuba
- Preceded by: Jeevan Bahadur Shahi
- Succeeded by: Rabindra Adhikari

Personal details
- Born: Saptari, Nepal
- Party: Nepali Congress (until 1 July 2024, 17 February 2026 -present)
- Other political affiliations: CPN (UML) (1 July 2024 - 17 February 2026)

Jitendra Narayan Dev (Nepali: जितेन्द्र नारायण देव) is a Nepali politician belonging to the Nepali Congress. He was also a member of the Rastriya Sabha and was elected under the open category. A prominent leader from Madhesh province, Dev has served as minister several times.

He was elected central committee member of Nepali Congress elected from the 14th general convention of Nepali Congress.
