= Dil Kumari Rawal Thapa =

Nepali politician

- दिल कुमारी रावल थापा

Member of National Assembly for Bagmati Province
- Incumbent
- Assumed office 4 March 2018
- Preceded by: Office established

Personal details
- Party: Communist Party of Nepal (Unified Marxist–Leninist)

Dil Kumari Rawal Thapa (Nepali: दिल कुमारी रावल थापा), also known as Parbati Rawal, is a Nepalese communist politician and member of the National Assembly. In 2018 she was elected in Bagmati Province for the Communist Party of Nepal (Unified Marxist–Leninist) with a six-year term. She is the President of the National Concern and Coordination Committee under the National Assembly.
