= Kali Bahadur Malla =

Nepali politician

Personal details
- Party: Communist Party of Nepal (Maoist)

Kali Bahadur Malla (Nepali: कालीबहादुर मल्ल) is a Nepalese politician, belonging to the Communist Party of Nepal. In the 2008 Constituent Assembly election he was elected from the Jajarkot-1 constituency, winning 19009 votes.
