= Goma Devi Timilsina =

Nepali politician

- गोमा देवी तिमिल्सीना

Member of CPN (Unified Socialist)
- Incumbent
- Assumed office 23 September 2021
- Preceded by: Position created

Member of Rastriya Sabha
- Incumbent
- Assumed office 2022
- Prime Minister: Sher Bahadur Deuba
- Constituency: Province No. 3

Personal details
- Born: Chitwan, Nepal
- Party: CPN (Unified Socialist)

Goma Devi Timilsina (Nepali: गोमा देवी तिमिल्सीना) is a Nepalese politician and member of the CPN (Unified Socialist). She is also a member of the Rastriya Sabha and was elected in the 2022 Nepalese National Assembly election.
