= Komal Oli =

Nepali newscaster and politician

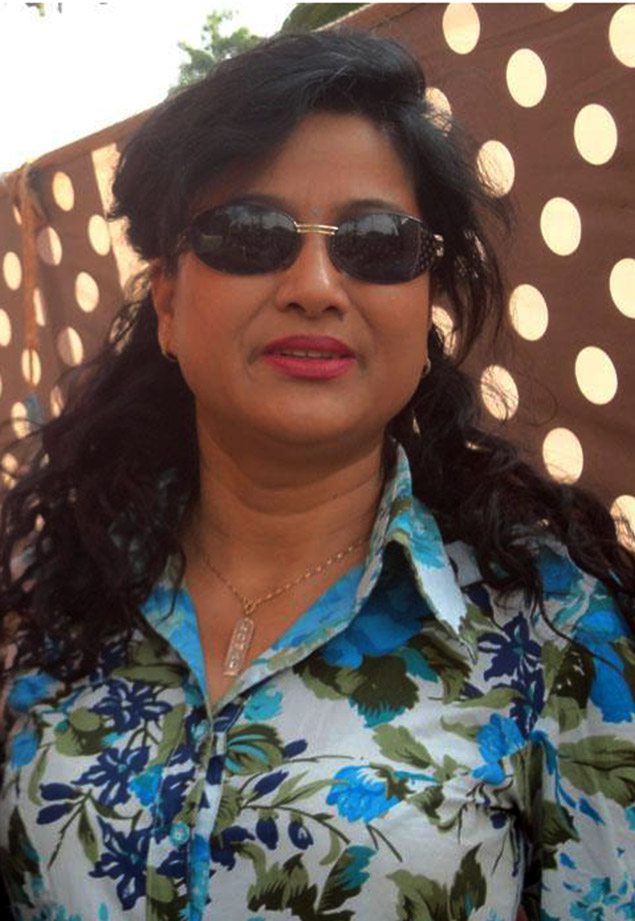

Member of the Nepali National Assembly for Province No. 5
- Incumbent
- Assumed office 4 March 2018
- Preceded by: Office established

Personal details
- Born: 16 April Dang, Province No. 5, Nepal
- Party: Nepal Communist Party (NCP)
- Other party: Rastriya Prajatantra Party Nepal; Communist Party of Nepal (United Marxist-Leninist)
- Occupation: folk singer, newscaster, radio personality, politician, entertainer

Komal Oli (Nepali: कोमल ओली) (born 16 April) is a Nepali newscaster, radio and television personality, folk singer, entertainer and politician. She entered into Nepali politics recently and is a member of the federal national assembly representing Nepal Communist Party (NCP) filling reserved quota for women. She has sung on many folk songs. She has never been married and her marital status has garnered much attention, with Komal, herself, having published a hit song Poila Jaana Paam! (literal translation: Let me elope!).

== Early life ==
Komal was born on 16 April in Tikari, Dang to Deepa and Lalit Oli. She is the eldest of four children. She spent all of her childhood in her hometown, graduating from a local school. She was self-trained in music while in school.

== Radio Nepal and folk singer ==
She entered the National Folk Singing Competition organised by Radio Nepal in 2046 BS and secured second place. She was offered a music deal by Radio Nepal that same year for one music album. In 2049 BS, she moved to Kathmandu and was hired as a newscaster by Radio Nepal.

== Success and fame ==
As a newscaster for Radio Nepal and a folk singer, she quickly became a familiar voice in the Nepalese household, because of the radio's accessibility to the remotest regions of the country. She has released more than a dozen albums throughout her career. In addition, she is an entertainer at public events. She also trains aspiring radio and tv journalists.

== Politics ==
She left her job at Radio Nepal to join the Rastriya Prajatantra Party Nepal which stands for reinstating monarchy and Hindu state. However, before the 2017 elections, she joined the Nepal Communist Party (United Marxist Leninist). When she did not feature in the list of party candidates in the election, she registered a rebel candidacy as an independent in her hometown constituency. Later, she withdrew her candidacy and announced support for the party candidate. She is currently serving as a member of the National Assembly. She was nominated by her party to fill the reserved quota for women from her home province.
