= Dina Nath Sharma =

Nepali politician (born 1945)

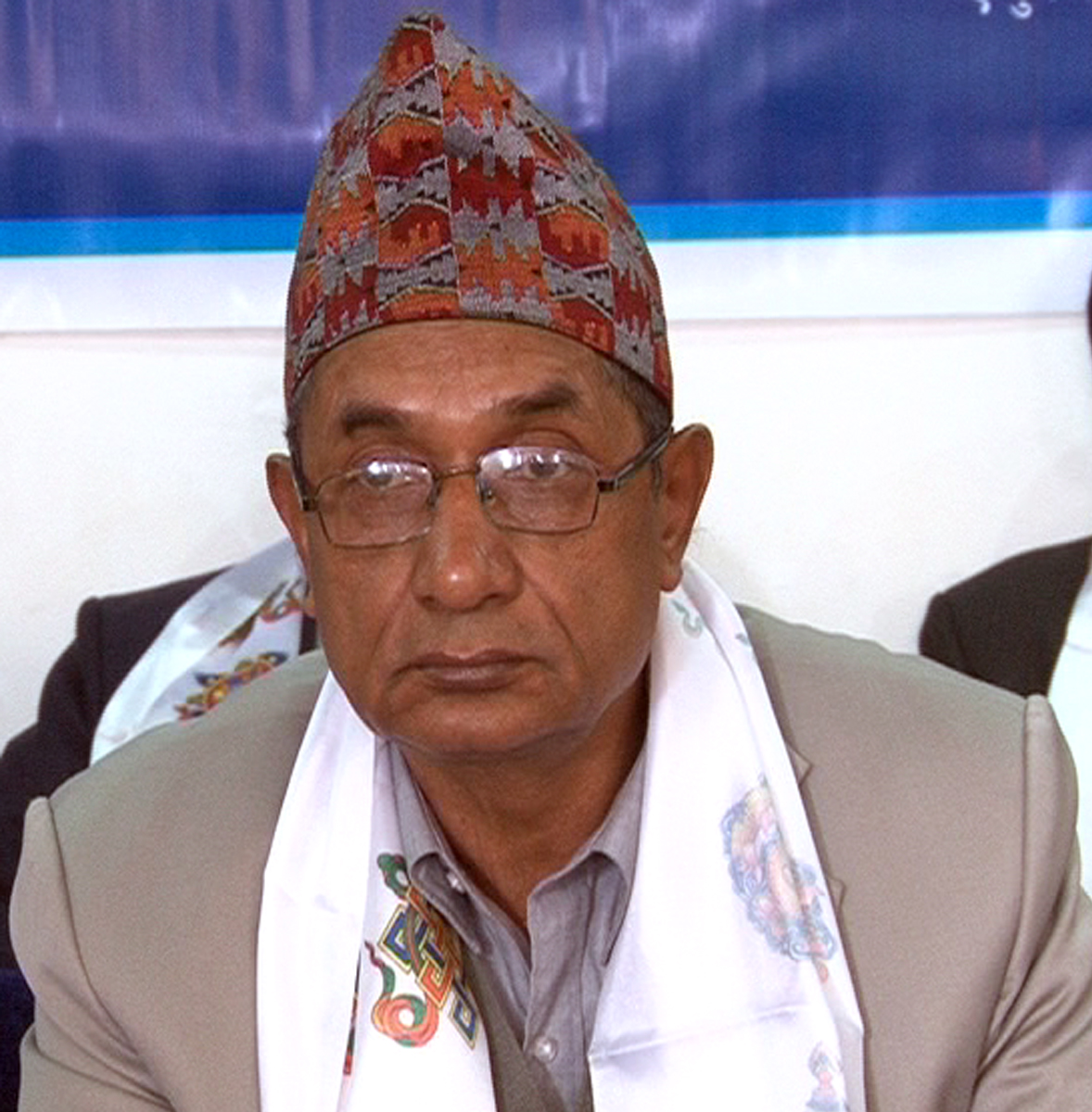

Leader of National assembly
- Incumbent
- Assumed office July 13, 2021
- President: Bidhya Devi Bhandari
- Prime Minister: Sher Bahadur Deuba
- Vice President: Nanda Kishor Pun
- Succeeded by: Suman Raj Pyakurel

Spokesperson, Unified Communist Party of Nepal (Maoist)

Personal details
- Born: 19 July 1945 (age 80) Baglung, Amalachaur-7, Gahatera
- Party: Communist Party of Nepal (Maoist Centre)
- Children: Rajan Paudel; Sajan Paudel; Shanta Sharma; Sharada Sharma; Kalpana Sharma
- Website: dinanathsharma.com.np

Dina Nath Sharma, alias Ashok, is a Nepalese politician. In 1999 he led a revolt within the CPN (Masal) against the party leadership. On April 6, 1999, Sharma split from the party and constituted his own parallel Communist Party of Nepal (Masal). Sharma's party called for boycott of elections and supported the armed struggle. Soon after the split, Sharma's party merged with the Communist Party of Nepal.

== Political career ==
Sharma was inducted into the Maoist politburo. Sharma represented the Maoists during the 2003 peace-talks.

After the end of the 2006 democracy movement in Nepal, Sharma was included in the group sent to Kathmandu to start peace negotiations with the new government.

In early 2005 Sharma was, along with Baburam Bhattarai and Hisila Yami, demoted by the party supremo Prachanda. In July of that year Prachandra reinstated Sharma into the politburo.
