= Bina Pokharel =

Nepali politician

Personal details
- Party: Communist Party of Nepal (Maoist Centre) (until 2018); Nepal Communist Party (from 2018)

Bina Pokharel (Nepali: विना पोखरेल) is a Nepalese communist politician and member of the National Assembly. In 2018 she was elected unopposed in Province No. 1 for the Communist Party of Nepal (Maoist Centre) with a six-year term.
