= Madan Kumari Shah =

Nepali politician

Honourable Madan Kumari Shah
- मदन कुमारी शाह

Secretary of CPN (Unified Socialist)
- Incumbent
- Assumed office 23 September 2021
- Preceded by: Position created

Member of Rastriya Sabha
- Incumbent
- Assumed office 2022
- Prime Minister: Sher Bahadur Deuba
- Constituency: Sudurpashchim Province

Personal details
- Party: CPN (Unified Socialist)

Madan Kumari Shah "Garima" (Nepali: मदन कुमारी शाह) is a current secretary of CPN (Unified Socialist). She is also a member of the Rastriya Sabha and was elected in the 2022 Nepalese National Assembly election. Shah is also in charge of Sudurpashchim Province committee of the party.
