= Renu Chand (Bhatt) =

Nepali politician

- रेनु चन्द

Member of the Constituent Assembly
- In office 28 May 2008 – 28 May 2012
- Preceded by: Binayadhoj Chand (as Member of Parliament)
- Succeeded by: Nar Bahadur Chand
- Constituency: Baitadi 2

Personal details
- Party: Communist Party of Nepal (Maoist Centre)

Renu Chand (Bhatt) (Nepali: रेनु चन्द) is a Nepalese politician, belonging to the Communist Party of Nepal (Maoist). In the 2008 Constituent Assembly election she was elected from the Baitadi-2 constituency, winning 20021 votes.
