= Durga Gurung =

Nepali politician

Honourable Durga Gurung
- दुर्गा गुरुङ

Member of Rastriya Sabha
- Incumbent
- Assumed office 2022
- Prime Minister: Sher Bahadur Deuba
- Constituency: Karnali Province

Personal details
- Party: Nepali Congress

Durga Gurung (Nepali: दुर्गा गुरुङ) is a Nepali politician belonging to the Nepali Congress. He is a member of the Rastriya Sabha and was elected under open category.
