= Haricharan Shiwakoti =

Nepali politician

Personal details
- Party: Communist Party of Nepal (Unified Marxist–Leninist) (until 2018); Nepal Communist Party (from 2018)

Haricharan Shiwakoti (Nepali: हरीचरण शिवाकोटी) is a Nepalese communist politician and member of the National Assembly. In 2018 he was elected unopposed in Province No. 1 for the Communist Party of Nepal (Unified Marxist–Leninist) with a two-year term.
