= Aagam Prasad Bantawa Rai =

Nepali politician

Personal details
- Party: Communist Party of Nepal (Unified Marxist–Leninist) (until 2018); Nepal Communist Party (from 2018)

Aagam Prasad Bantawa Rai (Nepali: अगम प्रसाद वान्तवा राई) is a Nepalese communist politician and member of the National Assembly. In 2018 he was elected in Province No. 1 for the Communist Party of Nepal (Unified Marxist–Leninist) with a four-year term.
