= Narayan Dutta Mishra =

Nepali politician

Honourable Narayan Dutta Mishra
- नारायण दत्त मिश्र

Member of Rastriya Sabha
- Incumbent
- Assumed office 2022
- Prime Minister: Sher Bahadur Deuba
- Constituency: Sudurpashchim Province

Personal details
- Party: Nepali Congress

Narayan Dutta Mishra (Nepali: नारायण दत्त मिश्र) is a Nepali politician belonging to Nepali Congress. He is a member of Rastriya Sabha and was elected under open category.
