= Gopal Kumar Basnet =

Nepali politician

- गोपाल कुमार बस्नेत

Memberof Nepali Congress
- Incumbent
- Assumed office 23 September 2021
- Preceded by: Position created

Member of Rastriya Sabha
- Incumbent
- Assumed office 2022
- Prime Minister: Sher Bahadur Deuba

Personal details
- Party: Nepali Congress

Gopal Kumar Basnet (Nepali: गोपाल कुमार बस्नेत) is a Nepalese politician. He is a member of the Rastriya Sabha and was elected in 2022 Nepalese National Assembly election.
