= Nainakala Ojha =

Nepali politician

Personal details
- Party: Communist Party of Nepal (Unified Marxist–Leninist) (until 2018); Nepal Communist Party (from 2018)

Nainakala Ojha (Nepali: नैनकला ओझा) is a Nepalese communist politician and member of the National Assembly. In 2018 she was elected unopposed in Province No. 1 for the Communist Party of Nepal (Unified Marxist–Leninist) with a four-year term. She is a founder member of the Taplejung All Nepal Women's Association (Akhil Nepal Mahila Sangha).
