= Yubaraj Sharma =

Nepali politician

Honourable Yubaraj Sharma
- युवराज शर्मा

Member of Rastriya Sabha
- Incumbent
- Assumed office 2022
- Prime Minister: Sher Bahadur Deuba
- Constituency: Lumbini Province

Personal details
- Party: Nepali Congress

Yubaraj Sharma (Nepali: युवराज शर्मा) is a Nepali politician belonging to the Nepali Congress. He is a member of the Rastriya Sabha and was elected under the open category.
