= Suresh Ale Magar =

Nepali politician

- सुरेश आलेमगर
- Incumbent
- Assumed office 2008
- Constituency: Tanahu-1
- Majority: 17744 votes.

Personal details
- Party: CPN (Maoist Centre)

Suresh Kumar Alemagar is a Nepalese politician, belonging to the CPN (Maoist Centre). He was previously working as a lecturer in English at the Nepal Law Campus, Tribhuvan University, Kathmandu.

Ale was the founding General Secretary of the Nepal Federation of Indigenous Nationalities and the Nepal Magar Association. He has also been the president of the All Nepal Nationalities Organisation.

In 1999 Ale was arrested three times under the Public Security Act. In late 1999, Amnesty International expressed concern over the possibility that Ale had 'disappeared'. However, after the visit of an AI official to Nepal, Ale was released by the state authorities in early 2000.

In 2004 Ale was arrested by Indian authorities, and handed over the government in Nepal. Ale was at the time active in the International Department of CPN(Maoist) and the World People's Resistance Movement. Matrika Prasad Yadav and Upendra Yadav were arrested along with Ale.

In the 2008 Constituent Assembly election he was elected from the Tanahu-1 constituency, winning 17744 votes.
