= Nara Bahadur Bista =

Nepali politician

- नरबहादुर बिष्ट

Member of Constituent Assembly
- In office 28 May 2008 – 28 May 2012
- Constituency: Surkhet-3

Personal details
- Party: Communist Party of Nepal (Maoist)

Nara Bahadur Bista (Nepali: नरबहादुर बिष्ट) is a Nepalese politician, belonging to the Communist Party of Nepal (Maoist). In the 2008 Constituent Assembly election he was elected from the Surkhet-3 constituency, winning 17429 votes.
