= Mohammad Khalid Siddiqui =

Nepali politician

Honourable Mohammad Khalid Siddiqui
- मोहम्मद खालिद सिद्दिकी

Member of Rastriya Sabha
- Incumbent
- Assumed office 2022
- Prime Minister: Sher Bahadur Deuba
- Constituency: Madhesh Province

Personal details
- Born: Ramaul, Siraha, Nepal
- Party: People's Socialist Party, Nepal
- Other political affiliations: Nepali Congress (till 2002)

Mohammad Khalid Siddiqui (Nepali: मोहम्मद खालिद सिद्दिकी) is a Nepali politician belonging to the People's Socialist Party, Nepal. He is also a member of the Rastriya Sabha and was elected in the open category.
