= Krishna Prasad Paudel =

Nepali politician

Honourable Krishna Prasad Paudel
- कृष्ण प्रसाद पौडेल

Member of Rastriya Sabha
- Incumbent
- Assumed office 2022

Personal details
- Born: Gandaki Province
- Party: Nepali Congress

Krishna Prasad Poudel (Nepali: कृष्ण प्रसाद पौडेल) is a Nepali politician belonging to Nepali Congress. He is a member of Rastriya Sabha and was elected under open category.
