= Suman Raj Pyakurel =

Nepali politician

Personal details
- Party: Communist Party of Nepal (Unified Marxist–Leninist) (until 2018); Nepal Communist Party (from 2018)

Suman Raj Pyakurel (Nepali: सुमन राज प्याकुरेल) is a Nepalese communist politician and member of the National Assembly. In 2018, he was elected unopposed in Province No. 2 for the Communist Party of Nepal (Unified Marxist–Leninist) with a four-year term.

In 2013, he ran for the Constituent Assembly election for the Communist Party of Nepal (Unified Marxist–Leninist).
