= 1st Karnali Provincial Assembly =

2017 legislative term in Nepal

2nd Assembly	→

Overview
- Legislative body: Karnali Provincial Assembly
- Jurisdiction: Karnali Province, Nepal
- Meeting place: Irrigation Division Office, Birendranagar, Surkhet District
- Term: 4 February 2018 – September 2022
- Election: 2017 provincial elections
- Government: Mahendra Bahadur Shahi cabinet Jeevan Bahadur Shahi cabinet
- Website: pga.karnali.gov.np

Provincial Assembly
- Members: 40
- Speaker: Raj Bahadur Shahi (UML)
- Deputy Speaker: Pushpa Bahadur Gharti (Maoist)
- Chief Minister: Mahendra Bahadur Shahi (Maoist); Jeevan Bahadur Shahi (Congress)
- Leader of the Opposition: Jeevan Bahadur Shahi (Congress); Yam Lal Kandel (UML)

The first Karnali Provincial Assembly was elected by the 2017 provincial elections. 40 members were elected to the assembly, 24 of whom were elected through direct elections and 16 of whom were elected through the party list proportional representation system. The term of the assembly started on 4 February 2018 and ended in September 2022. Mahendra Bahadur Shahi from the CPN (Maoist Centre) and Jeevan Bahadur Shahi from the Nepali Congress served as chief ministers during the term of the assembly. Raj Bahadur Shahi served as the speaker of the assembly and Pushpa Bahadur Gharti served as the deputy speaker.

== Composition ==
Party	Seats	
Party	After election	At dissolution
CPN (UML)	20	13
CPN (Maoist Centre)	13	11
Nepali Congress	6	6
CPN (Unified Socialist)	—	3
Rastriya Prajatantra Party	1	1
Vacant	—	6
Total	40	40

== Leaders ==
=== Speaker ===
- Speaker of the Provincial Assembly: Hon. Raj Bahadur Shahi
  - Deputy Speaker of the Provincial Assembly: Pushpa Ghari Bista

=== Parliamentary Party Leaders ===
- Leader of the House (Nepali Congress): Hon. Jeevan Bahadur Shahi
- Leader of Opposition (CPN (UML)): Yam Lal Kandel
- Parliamentary Party Leader (CPN (Maoist Centre)): Mahendra Bahadur Shahi
- Parliamentary Party Leader (Rastriya Prajatantra Party): Soshila Shahi

=== Whips ===
- Government Chief Whip (Nepali Congress): Him Bahadur Shahi
  - Whip (Nepali Congress): Amrita Shahi
- Opposition Chief Whip (CPN(UML)): Gulab Jung Shah

== Members ==
Constituency/PR group	Member	Party
Khas Arya	Amrita Shahi	Nepali Congress
Khas Arya	Badami Kwari Bohara	CPN (UML)
Khas Arya	Bimala KC	CPN (Maoist Centre)
Surkhet 2(B)	Binda Man Bista	CPN (Maoist Centre)
Dolpa 1(B)	Bir Bahadur Shahi	CPN (Maoist Centre)
Mugu 1(B)	Chandra Bahadur Shahi	CPN (Unified Socialist)
Humla 1(A)	Dal Rawal	CPN (UML)
Mugu 1(A)	Dan Singh Pariyar	CPN (UML)
Khas Arya	Devi Wali	CPN (Unified Socialist)
Indigenous peoples	Dinbandhu Shrestha	Nepali Congress
Jajarkot 1(A)	Ganesh Prasad Singh	CPN (Maoist Centre)
Western Rukum 1(B)	Gopal Sharma	CPN (Maoist Centre)
Salyan 1(A)	Gulab Jung Shah	CPN (UML)
Khas Arya	Him Bahadur Shahi	Nepali Congress
Dalit	Jhowa Kami	Nepali Congress
Humla 1(B)	Jeevan Bahadur Shahi	Nepali Congress
Jajarkot 1(B)	Karbir Shahi	CPN (UML)
Khas Arya, Backward area	Kaushilawati Khatri	CPN (UML)
Surkhet 1(B)	Khadka Bahadur Khatri	CPN (UML)
Khas Arya	Krishna Shah (Acharya)	CPN (Maoist Centre)
Kalikot 1(B)	Mahendra Bahadur Shahi	CPN (Maoist Centre)
Indigenous peoples	Mina Singh Rakhal	CPN (UML)
Jumla 1(A)	Naresh Bhandari	CPN (Maoist Centre)
Jumla 1(B)	Padam Bahadur Rokaya	CPN (Unified Socialist)
Khas Arya	Padma Khadka	CPN (UML)
Indigenous peoples, Backward area	Pushpa Gharti (Bista)	CPN (Maoist Centre)
Dailekh 2(B)	Raj Bahadur Shahi	CPN (UML)
Dalit	Raju Nepali	CPN (UML)
Western Rukum 1(A)	Rato Kami	CPN (Maoist Centre)
Dalit	Sita Kumari Nepali	CPN (Maoist Centre)
Khas Arya	Soshila Shahi	Rastriya Prajatantra Party
Dailekh 2(A)	Sushil Kumar Thapa	CPN (UML)
Khas Arya	Yagya Bahadur Budha Chhetri	Nepali Congress
Surkhet 2(A)	Yam Lal Kandel	CPN (UML)

=== Changes ===
Constituency/PR group	MPA	Party	Date seat vacated	Cause of vacation	New MPA	Party
Dailekh 1(A)	Dharma Raj Regmi	CPN (Maoist Centre)	12 April 2021	Resignation		
Dailekh 1(B)	Amar Bahadur Thapa	CPN (UML)	23 April 2021	Expelled by party		
Salyan 1(B)	Prakash Jwala	CPN (UML)	23 April 2021	Expelled by party		
Dolpa 1(A)	Nanda Singh Budha	CPN (UML)	23 April 2021	Expelled by party		
Kalikot 1(A)	Kurma Raj Shahi	CPN (UML)	23 April 2021	Expelled by party		
Surkhet 1(A)	Thammar Bahadur Bista	CPN (Maoist Centre)	20 March 2022	Expelled by party		

== See also ==
- Karnali Province
- 2017 Nepalese provincial elections
