= 2nd Karnali Provincial Assembly =

| ← | 1st Assembly |

Overview
- Legislative body: Karnali Provincial Assembly
- Jurisdiction: Karnali Province, Nepal
- Meeting place: Irrigation Division Office, Birendranagar, Surkhet District
- Term: 2 January 2023 –
- Election: 2022 provincial elections
- Government: Sharma cabinet, 2023; Kandel, 2024

Provincial Assembly
- Members: 40
- Speaker: Nanda Gurung, CPN (UML)
- Deputy Speaker: Yashoda Neupane, CPN (MC)
- Chief Minister: Yam Lal Kandel, CPN (UML)
- Leader of the Opposition: Raj Kumar Sharma, CPN (MC)
- Party control: Government (25): Congress: 15; CPN (UML): 10; Official Opposition (13): CPN (MC): 13; Other Opposition (2): CPN (US): 1; RPP: 1

The second Karnali Provincial Assembly was elected by the 2022 provincial elections on 20 November 2022. 40 members were elected to the assembly, 24 of whom were elected through direct elections and 16 of whom were elected through the party list proportional representation system. The first session of the assembly commenced from 2 January 2023.

== Leaders ==
=== Officers ===
- Speaker of the Assembly: Hon. Nanda Gurung (CPN (UML))
- Deputy Speaker of the Assembly: Hon. Yashoda Neupane (CPN (Maoist Centre))
- Leader of the House (Chief Minister): Hon. Raj Kumar Sharma (CPN (Maoist Centre))
- Leader of the Opposition: Hon. Jeevan Bahadur Shahi (Nepali Congress)

=== Parliamentary party ===
- Parliamentary party leader of Nepali Congress: Hon. Jeevan Bahadur Shahi
- Parliamentary party leader of CPN (Maoist Centre): Hon. Raj Kumar Sharma
- Parliamentary party leader of CPN (UML): Hon. Yam Lal Kandel

== Composition ==

| Party | Seats | | | | | |
| Party | After election | | | At present | | |
| Party | FPTP | PR | Total | FPTP | PR | Total |
|---|---|---|---|---|---|---|
| Nepali Congress | 9 | 5 | 14 | 10 | 5 | 15 |
| Nepali Communist Party | — | — | — | 9 | 5 | 14 |
| CPN (UML) | 5 | 5 | 10 | 5 | 5 | 10 |
| Rastriya Prajatantra Party | 0 | 1 | 1 | 0 | 1 | 1 |
| Independent | 1 | — | 1 | — | — | — |
Former Parties
| Maoist Centre | 9 | 4 | 13 | 9 | 4 | 13 |
| Unified Socialist | 0 | 1 | 1 | 0 | 1 | 1 |
| Total | 24 | 16 | 40 | 24 | 16 | 40 |

== Members ==
Nepali Congress (15)
| Constituency/PR group | Member | Portfolio & Responsibilities |
|---|---|---|
| Humla 1 (B) | Jeevan Bahadur Shahi | Leader of the Opposition; Parliamentary party leader |
| Salyan 1 (B) | Suresh Adhikari | |
| Kalikot 1 (B) | Hikmat Bahadur Bista | |
| Jajarkot 1 (A) | Bedraj Singh | |
| Jajarkot 1 (B) | Rajeev Bikram Shah | |
| Jumla 1 (A) | Devendra Bahadur Shahi | Elected as Independent |
| Dailekh 1 (A) | Purna Bahadur Khatri | |
| Dailekh 1 (B) | Krishna Kumar B.C. | |
| Dailekh 2 (A) | Ghanashyam Bhandari | |
| Surkhet 1 (A) | Khadga Bahadur Pokharel | |
| Khas Arya | Janaki Singh | |
| Khas Arya | Bijaya Budha | |
| Khas Arya, Backward area | Indra Kumari Shahi | |
| Dalit, Backward area | Laxmi Sunar | |
| Indigenous peoples | Balimaya Budha | |

Nepali Communist Party (14)
| Constituency/PR group | Member | Portfolio & Responsibilities |
|---|---|---|
| Western Rukum 1 (B) | Raj Kumar Sharma | Chief Minister (until June 2024); Parliamentary party leader (until November 2025) |
| Khas Arya | Yashoda Neupane | Deputy speaker of the assembly |
| Mugu 1 (B) | Mangal Bahadur Shahi | Minister for Physical Infrastructure, Energy and Water Resources |
| Salyan 1 (A) | Bhim Prakash Sharma | Minister for Land Management, Agriculture and Cooperatives |
| Surkhet 1 (B) | Krishna Bahadur G.C. | Minister for Interior Affairs and Law |
| Dolpa 1 (B) | Bir Bahadur Shahi | |
| Kalikot 1 (A) | Durga Bahadur Rawat | |
| Humla 1 (A) | Ran Singh Pariyar | |
| Surkhet 2 (B) | Vindaman Bista | |
| Western Rukum 1 (A) | Mahendra K.C. | |
| Khas Arya | Milan Khadka Roka | |
| Khas Arya | Kalyani Khadka (Note: Elected from CPN (Unified Socialist)) | |
| Dalit | Urmila Bishwakarma | |
| Indigenous peoples, Backward area | Jumkit Lama Karki | |

CPN (UML) (10)
| Constituency/PR group | Member | Portfolio & Responsibilities |
|---|---|---|
| Indigenous peoples | Nanda Gurung | Speaker of the assembly |
| Surkhet 2 (A) | Yam Lal Kandel | Chief Minister (since June 2024); Parliamentary party leader |
| Dailekh 2 (B) | Binod Kumar Shah | Minister for Economic Affairs |
| Jumla 1 (B) | Tekraj Pachhai | Minister for Social Development |
| Mugu 1 (A) | Jeet Bahadur Malla | Minister for Industry, Tourism, Forest and Environment |
| Dolpa 1 (A) | Sher Bahadur Budha | |
| Khas Arya, Backward area | Kal Bahadur Hamal | |
| Khas Arya | Dakshina Shahi | |
| Khas Arya | Tulasa Malla | |
| Dalit, Backward area | Gamata Bishwakarma | |

Rastriya Prajatantra Party (1)
| Constituency/PR group | Member | Portfolio & Responsibilities |
|---|---|---|
| Khas Arya | Santoshi Shahi | |

=== Defections ===
| Constituency/PR group | Member | From | To | Date |
|---|---|---|---|---|
| Jumla 1 (A) | Devendra Bahadur Shahi | Independent | Nepali Congress | 13 August 2023 |

=== Suspensions ===
| Constituency/PR group | Member | Party | From | To | Reason |
|---|---|---|---|---|---|
| Humla 1 (B) | Jeevan Bahadur Shahi | Nepali Congress | 4 April 2024 | | Facing corruption charges |
