= Yam Lal Kandel cabinet =

Incumbent cabinet of Karnali Province, since 2024

- 4th Cabinet of Karnali Province
- 2024–present
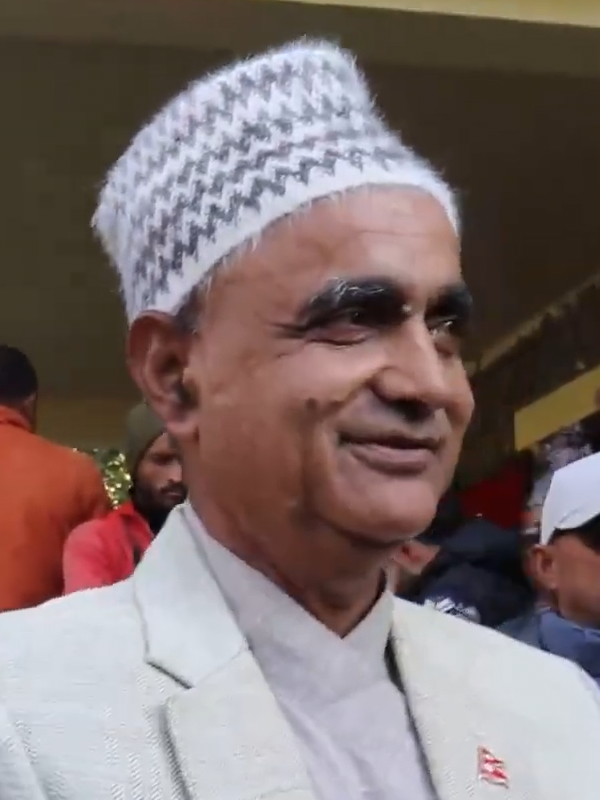
- Hon'ble Chief Minister Yam Lal Kandel
- Date formed: 10 April 2024

People and organisations
- Governor: Tilak Pariyar; Yagya Raj Joshi
- Chief Minister: Yam Lal Kandel
- Chief Minister's history: Member of the Karnali Provincial Assembly (2018–present); Member of the Parliament, Pratinidhi Sabha (1994–1998); Minister of Tourism and Civil Aviation (1998–1998); Leader of the Opposition in the Karnali Provincial Assembly (2021–2022, 2023–2024)
- No. of ministers: 8 (incl. Chief Minister)
- Ministers removed: 4 resigned
- Total no. of members: 12
- Member parties: CPN (UML); Nepali Congress Former Members: CPN (MC)
- Status in legislature: Provincial Assembly 23 / 40 (58%)
- Opposition party: CPN (Maoist Centre)
- Opposition leader: Raj Kumar Sharma

History
- Election: 2022
- Legislature term: 5 years
- Predecessor: Raj Kumar Sharma cabinet

The Yam Lal Kandel cabinet is the current 4th cabinet of Karnali Province, formed on 10 April 2024 after Yam Lal Kandel was sworn in as the new Chief Minister of Karnali Province by Governor Tilak Pariyar. Kandel was appointed chief minister as per Article 168(2) of the constitution, after Raj Kumar Sharma of the CPN (Maoist Centre) resigned from the Chief Minister on 3 April 2024.

== History ==
Kandel's claim for chief minister was supported by the Communist Party of Nepal (Maoist Centre) and Communist Party of Nepal (Unified Socialist), alongside his own Communist Party of Nepal (Unified Marxist-Leninist). Chief Minister Kandel took his oath office on 10 April 2024.

On 25 April 2024, Kandel won a vote of confidence with 23 votes in his favor, 11 votes against and one was neutral out of the 35 members present in the 40-member Karnali Provincial Assembly, where he was supported by the CPN (Unified Marxist-Leninist) and CPN (Maoist Centre) with the Nepali Congress staying in opposition.

The cabinet was then expanded to include six ministers and one state minister on 30 April 2024. Meanwhile, Ran Singh Pariyar, who was inducted into the Cabinet on 24 April 2025 as a minister without portfolio, has been assigned to the Ministry of Water Resources and Energy Development on same days.

On 22 July 2024, all ministers from the CPN (Maoist Centre) resigned from the government, with the party also withdrawing its support, after national level alliance was formed between two major parties the Nepali Congress and CPN (Unified Marxist-Leninist).

On 4 August 2024, Kandel has reshuffled the cabinet by appointing four ministers from the Nepali Congress.

Kandel won a vote of confidence with 23 votes in his favor and 14 votes against and out of the 37 members present in the 40-member Karnali Provincial Assembly on 5 August 2024, where he was supported by the CPN (Unified Marxist-Leninist) and Nepali Congress with the CPN (Maoist Centre) and CPN (Unified Socialist) staying in opposition.

== Ministers ==
S.N.	Portfolio	Minister	Political Party	Assumed office	Left office
Cabinet ministers
1	Chief Minister	Yam Lal Kandel	CPN (UML)	10 April 2024	Incumbent
2	Minister for Land Management, Agriculture and Cooperatives	Binod Kumar Shah	CPN (UML)	22 May 2024	Incumbent
3	Minister for Physical Infrastructure and Urban Development	Sher Bahadur Budha	CPN (UML)	30 April 2024	Incumbent
State ministers
4	Minister of State for Physical Infrastructure and Urban Development	Gamata Bishwakarma	CPN (UML)	30 April 2024	Incumbent

== Former Ministers ==
=== With Nepali Congress as major Partner ===
==== Till July 2025 ====
S.N.	Portfolio	Minister	Political Party	Assumed office	Left office
Cabinet ministers
1	Chief Minister: Minister for Internal Affairs and Law	Yam Lal Kandel	CPN (UML)	10 April 2024	Incumbent
2	Minister for Economic Affairs	Rajeev Bikram Shah	Nepali Congress	4 August 2024	15 July 2026
3	Minister for Land Management, Agriculture and Cooperatives	Binod Kumar Shah	CPN (UML)	22 May 2024	Incumbent
4	Minister for Physical Infrastructure and Urban Development	Sher Bahadur Budha	CPN (UML)	30 April 2024	Incumbent
5	Minister for Social Development	Ghanashyam Bhandari	Nepali Congress	4 August 2024	15 July 2026
6	Minister for Water Resource and Energy Development	Bijaya Budha	Nepali Congress	4 August 2024	15 July 2026
7	Minister for Industry, Tourism, Forest and Environment	Suresh Adhikari	Nepali Congress	4 August 2024	15 July 2026
State ministers
8	Minister of State for Physical Infrastructure and Urban Development	Gamata Bishwakarma	CPN (UML)	30 April 2024	Incumbent

=== With CPN (Maoist Centre) as major Partner ===
==== Till July 2024 ====
S.N.	Portfolio	Minister	Political Party	Assumed office	Left office
Cabinet ministers
1	Chief Minister: Minister for Internal Affairs and Law	Yam Lal Kandel	CPN (UML)	10 April 2024	Incumbent
2	Minister for Economic Affairs	Mahendra K.C.	Maoist Centre	30 April 2024	22 July 2024
3	Minister for Land Management, Agriculture and Cooperatives	Binod Kumar Shah	CPN (UML)	22 May 2024	Incumbent
4	Minister for Industry, Tourism, Forest and Environment	Durga Bahadur Rawat	Maoist Centre	30 April 2024	22 July 2024
5	Minister for Physical Infrastructure and Urban Development	Sher Bahadur Budha	CPN (UML)	30 April 2024	Incumbent
6	Minister for Water Resource and Energy Development	Ran Singh Pariyar	Maoist Centre	24 April 2024	22 July 2024
7	Minister for Social Development	Bir Bahadur Shahi	Maoist Centre	30 April 2024	22 July 2024
State ministers
8	Minister of State for Physical Infrastructure and Urban Development	Gamata Bishwakarma	CPN (UML)	30 April 2024	Incumbent

== See also ==
- Third Hikmat Kumar Karki cabinet
- Satish Kumar Singh cabinet
- Bahadur Singh Lama cabinet
- Second Surendra Raj Pandey cabinet
- Second Kamal Bahadur Shah cabinet
