= Chief Minister of Karnali Province =

Head of Karnali Province government

- कर्णाली प्रदेशका मुख्यमन्त्री
- Emblem of Karnali Province
- Incumbent; Mangal Bahadur Shahi since 29 July 2026
- Government of Karnali Province
- Style: Honorable; Mr. Chief Minister
- Status: Head of Government
- Abbreviation: CMO
- Member of: Provincial Assembly; Cabinet
- Appointer: Governor
- Term length: Until majority confidence retained in provincial assembly Assembly term is 5 years unless dissolved earlier; No term limits
- Formation: 2018 (8 years ago)
- First holder: Mahendra Bahadur Shahi
- Salary: रु. - 61,000
- Website: Official website

The Chief Minister of the Karnali Province is the head of government of Karnali Province. The chief minister is appointed by the governor of the province according to Article 167 of the Constitution of Nepal. The chief minister remains in office for five years or until the provincial assembly is dissolved, and is subject to no term limits, given that they have the confidence of the assembly.

The current chief minister is Mangal Bahadur Shahi of the Nepali Communist Party, in office since 29 July 2026.

== Qualification ==
The Constitution of Nepal sets the qualifications required to become eligible for the office of chief minister. A chief minister must meet the qualifications to become a member of the provincial assembly.

A member of the provincial assembly must be:

- a citizen of Nepal
- a voter of the concerned province
- of 25 years of age or more
- not convicted of any criminal offense
- not disqualified by any law
- not holding any office of profit

In addition to this, the chief minister must be the parliamentary party leader of the party with the majority seats in the provincial assembly. If no party has a majority, the chief minister must have a majority in the assembly with the support from other parties. If within thirty days of the election, a chief minister is not appointed as such, or fails to obtain a vote of confidence from the assembly, the parliamentary party leader of the party with the most seats in the assembly is appointed chief minister. If the chief minister such appointed fails to obtain a vote of confidence in the assembly, any assembly member who can command a majority in the floor, irrespective of party allegiance, is appointed chief minister. If this chief minister also fails to obtain a vote of confidence, the governor dissolves the assembly and fresh elections are called.

== List of chief ministers of Karnali province ==
No.	Portrait	Name Constituency (lifespan)	Term of office			Assembly (election)	Political party	Cabinet	Ref.
No.	Portrait	Name Constituency (lifespan)	Assumed office	Left office	Time in office	Assembly (election)	Political party	Cabinet	Ref.
1		Mahendra Bahadur Shahi; MPA for Kalikot 1 (B) (born 1977)	16 February 2018	1 November 2021	3 years, 258 days	1st (2017)	CPN (Maoist Centre)	Mahendra Shahi	
2		Jeevan Bahadur Shahi; MPA for Humla 1 (B) (born 1965)	2 November 2021	12 January 2023	1 year, 71 days	1st (2017)	Nepali Congress	J. B. Shahi	
3		Raj Kumar Sharma; MPA for Western Rukum 1 (B) (born 1971)	12 January 2023	3 April 2024	1 year, 82 days	2nd (2022)	CPN (Maoist Centre)	Sharma	
4		Yam Lal Kandel; MPA for Surkhet 2 (A) (born 1961)	10 April 2024	28 July 2026	2 years, 109 days	2nd (2022)	CPN (UML)	Kandel	
5		Mangal Bahadur Shahi; MPA for Mugu 1 (B) (born 1968)	29 July 2026	Incumbent	94 days	2nd (2022)	Nepali Communist Party	Mangal Shahi	
