= Deputy Speaker of the Karnali Provincial Assembly =

Deputy Speaker of the Karnali Pradesh Sabha
- कोशी प्रदेशसभाका उपसभामुख
- Incumbent; Yashoda Neupane since 18 January 2023
- Karnali Provincial Assembly
- Style: Honourable
- Member of: Karnali Provincial Assembly
- Nominator: Party offices
- Appointer: Members of the Karnali Provincial Assembly
- Term length: During the life of the Pradesh Sabha (five years maximum)
- Constituting instrument: Constitution of Nepal
- Inaugural holder: Pushpa Gharti (Bista)
- Formation: 17 February 2018 (8 years ago)
- Salary: रु.

The Deputy Speaker of the Karnali Provincial Assembly is subordinate to the Speaker of the Karnali Provincial Assembly. They are responsible for the Karnali Provincial Assembly and the second highest ranking provincial officer of the Karnali Provincial Assembly. They act as the presiding officer in case of leave or absence caused by death or illness of the Speaker of the Karnali Provincial Assembly. The deputy speaker is chosen from sitting members of the Karnali Provincial Assembly. The deputy speaker can be removed from office by a resolution passed in the assembly by an effective majority of its members.

The current deputy speaker is CPN (Maoist Centre), Yashoda Neupane in office since 18 January 2023.

== Qualification ==
The Constitution of Nepal sets the qualifications required to become eligible for the office of the Speaker and Deputy Speaker. A Speaker and Deputy Speaker must meet the qualifications to become a member of the provincial assembly. A member of the provincial assembly must be:

(a) One who is a citizen of Nepal;

(b) One who is a voter of the concerned Province;

(c) One who has completed the age of twenty-five years;

(d) One who is not convicted of a criminal offense involving moral turpitude;

(e) One who is not disqualified by any law; and

(f) One who is not holding any office of profit.

== Removal ==
"Speaker and Deputy Speaker of the Provincial Assembly shall fall vacant in any of the following circumstances:-

(a) "In case he or she ceases to be a member of the Provincial Assembly;
Provided that, in the event of the dissolution of the Provincial Assembly, the Speaker of Province and the Deputy Speaker holding their respective offices shall continue in office until the previous day of the filing of nominations for another election to the Provincial Assembly;

(b) "In case he or she tenders resignation in writing;

(c) "In case a resolution is adopted by a majority of two-thirds of the total number of the then members of the Provincial Assembly to the effect that his or her conduct is not compatible with his or her office."

== List of Deputy Speakers ==
No.	Name Constituency	Term of office			Assembly (election)	Party	Ref
No.	Name Constituency	Took office	Left office	Term	Assembly (election)	Party	Ref
1	Pushpa Gharti (Bista); List MPA	17 February 2018	18 September 2022	4 years, 213 days	1st (2018)	CPN (Maoist Centre)	
2	Yashoda Neupane; List MPA	18 January 2023	Incumbent	3 years, 232 days	2nd (2023)	CPN (Maoist Centre)	

== See also ==
- Deputy Speaker of the Koshi Provincial Assembly
