= Gopal Sharma (Nepalese politician) =

Nepalese politician

- गोपाल शर्मा

Member of Parliament, Pratinidhi Sabha
- Incumbent
- Assumed office 26 March 2026
- Preceded by: Janardan Sharma
- Constituency: Western Rukum 1

Personal details
- Born: 27 December 1977 (age 48)
- Party: Nepali Communist Party
- Other political affiliations: CPN (Maoist Centre)
- Spouse: Anju Sharma
- Parent: Nayak Pramananda Dhakal (father)

Gopal Sharma is a Nepalese politician currently serving as a member of Parliament (MP) for Western Rukum 1 from the Nepali Communist Party.

He previously served as a member of the Karnali Provincial Assembly from 2017 to 2022 for Western Rukum 1 (B).

== Political career ==
Sharma was elected to the 1st Province 6 Assembly for Western Rukum 1 (B) at the 2017 provincial elections. He was appointed as the minister for Economic Affairs and Planning in May 2021 in the M. B. Shahi cabinet.

Sharma was elected to the Pratinidhi Sabha from Western Rukum 1 at the 2026 general election.

== Personal life ==
His older brother was the mayor of Chaurjahari.
