= Jumla 1 =

Parliamentary constituency in Nepal

- Parliamentary constituency for the House of Representatives
- Jumla 1 in Karnali Province

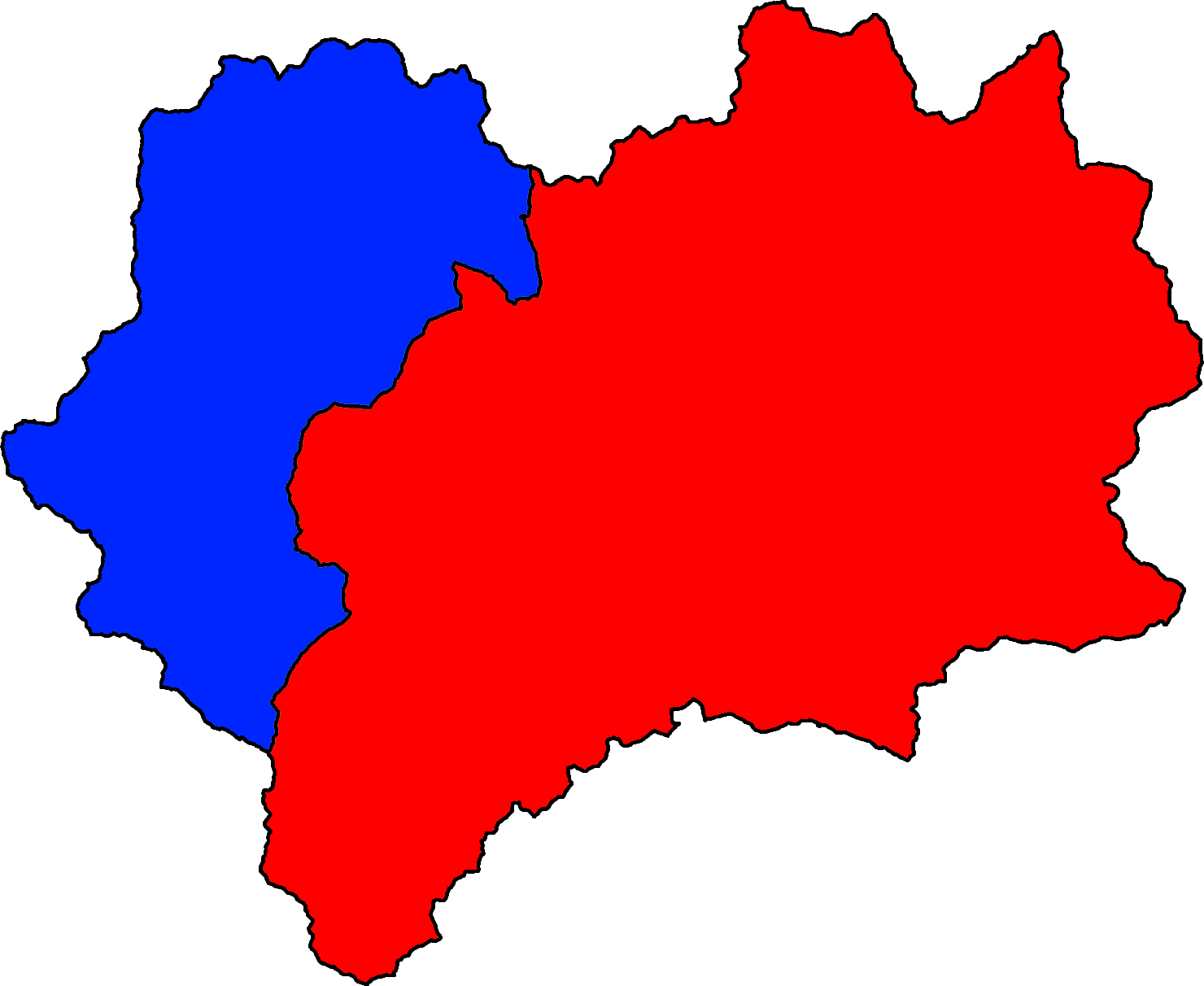
- Assembly segments Jumla 1(A) (red) and Jumla 1(B) (blue) within Jumla District
- Province: Karnali Province
- District: Jumla District
- Electorate: 59,059

Current constituency
- Created: 1991
- Party: Rastriya Prajatantra Party
- Member of Parliament: Gyan Bahadur Shahi (Gyanendra Shahi)
- Karnali MPA 1(A): Devendra B Shahi, Independent
- Karnali MPA 1(B): Tekraj Pachhai, UML

Jumla 1 is the parliamentary constituency of Jumla District in Nepal. This constituency came into existence on the Constituency Delimitation Commission report submitted on 31 August 2017.

== Incorporated areas ==
Jumla 1 incorporates the entirety of Jumla District.

== Assembly segments ==
It encompasses the following Karnali Provincial Assembly segment

- Jumla 1(A)
- Jumla 1(B)

== Members of Parliament ==
=== Parliament/Constituent Assembly ===
Election	Member	Party
1991	Dilli Bahadur Mahat	Nepal Workers Peasants Party
1994	Bhakta Bahadur Rokaya	Nepal Workers Peasants Party
1995	Bhakta Bahadur Rokaya	Nepali Congress
1999	Devi Lal Thapa	CPN (UML)
2008	Naresh Bhandari	CPN (Maoist)
January 2009	Naresh Bhandari	UCPN (Maoist)
2013	Lalit Jang Shahi	Nepali Congress
2017	Gajendra Bahadur Mahat	CPN (Maoist Centre)
May 2018	Gajendra Bahadur Mahat	Nepal Communist Party
March 2021	Gajendra Bahadur Mahat	CPN (Maoist Centre)
2022	Gyan Bahadur Shahi	Rastriya Prajatantra Party
2026	Gyan Bahadur Shahi	Rastriya Prajatantra Party

=== Provincial Assembly ===
==== 1(A) ====
Election	Member	Party
2017	Naresh Bhandari	CPN (Maoist Centre)
May 2018	Naresh Bhandari	Nepal Communist Party
March 2021	Naresh Bhandari	CPN (Maoist Centre)
2022	Devendra Bahadur Shahi	Independent

==== 1(B) ====
Election	Member	Party
2017	Padam Bahadur Rokaya	CPN (UML)
May 2018	Padam Bahadur Rokaya	Nepal Communist Party
March 2021	Padam Bahadur Rokaya	CPN (Unified Marxist–Leninist)
August 2021	Padam Bahadur Rokaya	CPN (Unified Socialist)
2022	Tekraj Pachhai	CPN (UML)

== Election results ==
=== Election in the 2020s ===
==== 2026 general election ====
Candidate	Party	Votes	%
Gyan Bahadur Shahi	Rastriya Prajatantra Party	14,816	37.82
Naresh Bhandari	Nepali Communist Party	11,635	29.70
Dip Bahadur Shahi	Nepali Congress	7,143	18.23
Shanti Lal Mahat	CPN (UML)	4,518	11.53
Binita Kathayat	Rastriya Swatantra Party	421	1.07
Birkha Bahadur Shahi	Nepal Workers Peasants Party	400	1.02
Manrishi Dhital	Pragatisheel Loktantrik Party	112	0.29
Others		128	0.33
Total		39,173	100.00
Majority		3,181	
Rastriya Prajatantra Party gain			

==== 2022 general election ====
Candidate	Party	Votes	%
Gyan Bahadur Shahi	Rastriya Prajatantra Party	22,819	53.31
Goma Gautam	CPN (Maoist Centre)	11,959	27.94
Ratan Nath Yogi	CPN (UML)	6,528	15.25
Others		1,500	3.50
Total		42,806	100.00
Majority		10,860	
Rastriya Prajatantra Party gain			

==== 2022 provincial election ====
===== 1(A) =====
Candidate	Party	Votes	%
Devendra Bahadur Shahi	Independent	9,654	40.94
Lalit Jung Shahi	Nepali Congress	7,755	32.88
Dhirendra Raj Giri	CPN (UML)	5,480	23.24
Rajeshwar Devkota	Nepal Workers Peasants Party	694	2.94
Total		23,583	100.00
Majority		1,899	
Independent			

===== 1(B) =====
Candidate	Party	Votes	%
Tekraj Pachhai	CPN (UML)	7,827	39.31
Padam Bahadur Rokaya	CPN (Unified Socialist)	6,715	33.73
Dhan Bahadur Basnet	Independent	4,165	20.92
Birsha Bahadur Rawat	Nepal Workers Peasants Party	1,202	6.04
Total		19,909	100.00
Majority		1,112	
CPN (UML)			

=== Election in the 2010s ===
==== 2017 general election ====
Candidate	Party	Votes	%
Gajendra Bahadur Mahat	CPN (Maoist Centre)	22,173	50.70
Devendra Bahadur Shahi	Nepali Congress	14,149	32.35
Dilli Prasad Kafle	Nepal Workers Peasants Party	2,718	6.22
Others		4,691	10.73
Total		43,731	100.00
Valid votes		43,731	96.21
Invalid/blank votes		1,725	3.79
Total votes		45,456	100.00
Registered voters/turnout		59,059	76.97
Majority		8,024	
CPN (Maoist Centre) gain			
Source: Election Commission

==== 2017 provincial election ====
===== 1(A) =====
Candidate	Party	Votes	%
Naresh Bhandari	CPN (Maoist Centre)	12,574	55.78
Raju Singh Kathayat	Nepali Congress	8,537	37.87
Shiva Lal Dangi	Nepal Workers Peasants Party	1,028	4.56
Others		405	1.80
Total		22,544	100.00
Valid votes		22,544	95.72
Invalid/blank votes		1,008	4.28
Total votes		23,552	100.00
Registered voters/turnout		31,715	74.26
Majority		4,037	
CPN (Maoist Centre) gain			
Source: Election Commission

===== 1(B) =====
Candidate	Party	Votes	%
Padam Bahadur Rokaya	CPN (UML)	6,414	48.45
Bhim Nidhi Hamal	Nepali Congress	5,280	39.88
Gorkha Bahadur Budha	Nepal Workers Peasants Party	1,336	10.09
Deep Chandra Chaulagain	Ekikrit RPP (Nationalist)	209	1.58
Total		13,239	100.00
Valid votes		13,239	96.05
Invalid/blank votes		544	3.95
Total votes		13,783	100.00
Registered voters/turnout		27,344	50.41
Majority		1,134	
CPN (UML) gain			
Source: Election Commission

==== 2013 Constituent Assembly election ====
Candidate	Party	Votes	%
Lalit Jung Shahi	Nepali Congress	11,866	31.42
Padam Bahadur Rokaya	CPN (UML)	11,151	29.52
Gajendra Bahadur Mahat	UCPN (Maoist)	10,133	26.83
Jay Bahadur Shahi	Nepal Workers Peasants Party	2,841	7.52
Others		1,780	4.71
Total		37,771	100.00
Valid votes		37,771	96.68
Invalid/blank votes		1,297	3.32
Total votes		39,068	100.00
Registered voters/turnout		47,445	82.34
Majority		715	
Nepali Congress gain			
Source: Election Commission

=== Election in the 2000s ===
==== 2008 Constituent Assembly election ====
Candidate	Party	Votes	%
Naresh Bhandari	CPN (Maoist)	21,127	49.63
Dilli Bahadur Mahat	CPN (UML)	9,210	21.64
Dinbandhu Shrestha	Nepali Congress	5,704	13.40
Dilli Prasad Kafle	Nepal Workers Peasants Party	3,936	9.25
Mansoor Sunar	Rastriya Prajatantra Party	1,719	4.04
Others		871	2.05
Total		42,567	100.00
Valid votes		42,567	96.88
Invalid/blank votes		1,372	3.12
Total votes		43,939	100.00
Registered voters/turnout		61,868	71.02
Majority		11,917	
CPN (Maoist) gain			
Source: Election Commission

=== Election in the 1990s ===
==== 1999 general election ====
Candidate	Party	Votes	%
Devi Lal Thapa	CPN (UML)	11,324	29.71
Dinbandhu Shrestha	Nepali Congress	8,318	21.82
Lalit Jung Shahi	Independent	6,879	18.05
Dilli Prasad Kafle	Nepal Workers Peasants Party	5,233	13.73
Chandra Bahdur Thapa	Rastriya Prajatantra Party	4,021	10.55
Others		2,338	6.13
Total		38,113	100.00
Valid votes		38,113	98.15
Invalid/blank votes		718	1.85
Total votes		38,831	100.00
Registered voters/turnout		52,220	74.36
Majority		3,006	
CPN (UML) gain			
Source: Election Commission

==== 1994 general election ====
Candidate	Party	Votes	%
Bhakta Bahadur Rokaya	Nepal Workers Peasants Party	6,593	27.72
Devi Lal Thapa	CPN (UML)	5,551	23.34
Harish Chandra Mahara	Rastriya Prajatantra Party	5,132	21.57
Lal Hamal	Nepali Congress	3,791	15.94
Adnan Singh Katayat	Independent	1,814	7.63
Others		906	3.81
Total		23,787	100.00
Majority		1,042	
Nepal Workers Peasants Party hold			
Source: Election Commission

==== 1991 general election ====
Candidate	Party	Votes	%
Dilli Bahadur Mahat	Nepal Workers Peasants Party	13,270	59.21
-	Nepali Congress	9,142	40.79
Total		22,412	100.00
Majority		4,128	
Nepal Workers Peasants Party gain			

== See also ==
- List of parliamentary constituencies of Nepal
