= Jajarkot 1 =

Parliamentary constituency in Nepal

- Parliamentary constituency for the House of Representatives
- Jajarkot 1 in Karnali Province

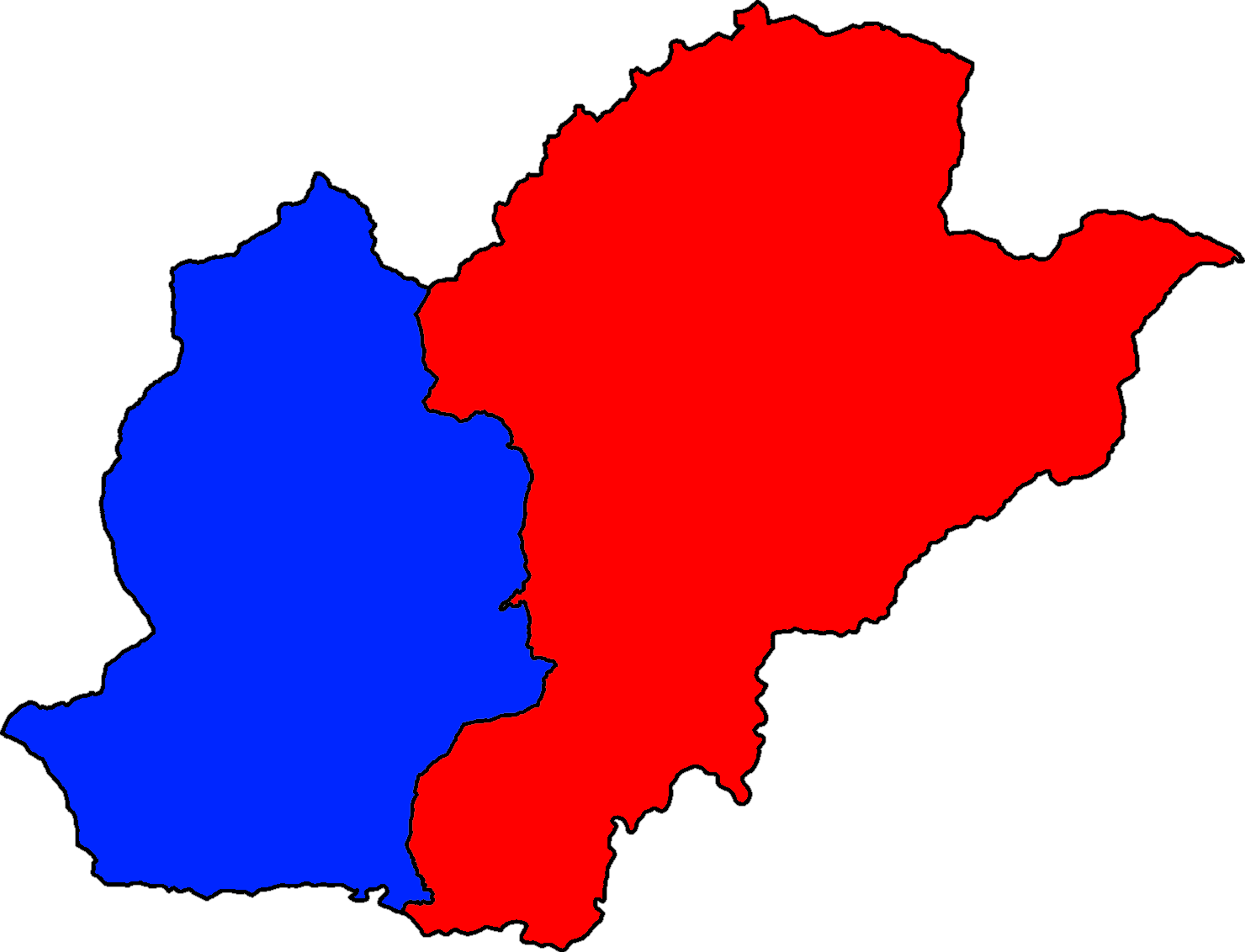
- Assembly segments Jajarkot 1(A) (red) and Jajarkot 1(B) (blue) within Jajarkot District
- Province: Karnali Province
- District: Jajarkot District
- Electorate: 83,937

Current constituency
- Created: 1991
- Number of members: 3
- Member of Parliament: Shakti Basnet, Maoist Centre
- Karnali MPA 1(A): Bedraj Singh, Congress
- Karnali MPA 1(B): Rajeev Bikram Shah, Congress

Jajarkot 1 is the parliamentary constituency of Jajarkot District in Nepal. This constituency came into existence on the Constituency Delimitation Commission (CDC) report submitted on 31 August 2017.

== Incorporated areas ==
Jajarkot 1 incorporates the entirety of Jajarkot District.

== Assembly segments ==
It encompasses the following Karnali Provincial Assembly segment

- Jajarkot 1(A)
- Jajarkot 1(B)

== Members of Parliament ==
=== Parliament/Constituent Assembly ===
Election	Member	Party
1991	Dwarika Prasad Pradhan	Nepali Congress
1994	Jhalak Nath Wagle	Nepali Congress
1999	Govinda Bikram Shah	Rastriya Prajatantra Party
2008	Kali Bahadur Malla	CPN (Maoist)
January 2009	Kali Bahadur Malla	UCPN (Maoist)
2013	Shakti Bahadur Basnet	UCPN (Maoist)
May 2016	Shakti Bahadur Basnet	CPN (Maoist Centre)
May 2018	Shakti Bahadur Basnet	Nepal Communist Party
March 2021	Shakti Bahadur Basnet	CPN (Maoist Centre)

=== Provincial Assembly ===
==== 1(A) ====
Election	Member	Party
2017	Ganesh Prasad Singh	CPN (Maoist Centre)
May 2018	Ganesh Prasad Singh	Nepal Communist Party
March 2021	Ganesh Prasad Singh	CPN (Maoist Centre)
2022	Bedraj Singh	Nepali Congress

==== 1(B) ====
Election	Member	Party
2017	Karbir Shahi	CPN (UML)
May 2018	Karbir Shahi	Nepal Communist Party
March 2021	Karbir Shahi	CPN (UML)
2022	Rajeev Bikram Shah	Nepali Congress

== Election results ==
=== Election in the 2020s ===
==== 2022 general election ====
Candidate	Party	Votes	%
Shakti Bahadur Basnet	CPN (Maoist Centre)	34,151	55.41
Niraj Prasad Acharya	CPN (UML)	25,120	40.75
Nar Bahadur Karki	Independent	1,191	1.93
Others		1,175	1.91
Total		61,637	100.00
Majority		9,031	
CPN (Maoist Centre) hold			

==== 2022 provincial election ====
===== 1(A) =====
Candidate	Party	Votes	%
Bedraj Singh	Nepali Congress	18,543	53.11
Dambar Bahadur Singh	CPN (UML)	11,470	32.85
Kaman Bahadur Khadka	Independent	4,446	12.73
Others		457	1.31
Total		34,916	100.00
Majority		7,073	
Nepali Congress gain			

===== 1(B) =====
Candidate	Party	Votes	%
Rajeev Bikram Shah	Nepali Congress	16,040	59.29
Khim Bahadur Shahi	CPN (UML)	10,530	38.92
Others		485	1.79
Total		27,055	100.00
Majority		5,510	
Nepali Congress gain			

=== Election in the 2010s ===
==== 2017 general election ====
Candidate	Party	Votes	%
Shakti Bahadur Basnet	CPN (Maoist Centre)	32,281	56.81
Rajeev Bikram Shah	Nepali Congress	23,289	40.98
Others		1,254	2.21
Total		56,824	100.00
Valid votes		56,824	93.51
Invalid/blank votes		3,941	6.49
Total votes		60,765	100.00
Registered voters/turnout		83,937	72.39
Majority		8,992	
CPN (Maoist Centre) hold			
Source: Election Commission

==== 2017 provincial election ====
===== 1(A) =====
Candidate	Party	Votes	%
Ganesh Prasad Singh	CPN (Maoist Centre)	16,911	55.56
Bedraj Singh	Nepali Congress	12,878	42.31
Others		649	2.13
Total		30,438	100.00
Valid votes		30,438	93.61
Invalid/blank votes		2,079	6.39
Total votes		32,517	100.00
Registered voters/turnout		45,472	71.51
Majority		4,033	
CPN (Maoist Centre) gain			
Source: Election Commission

===== 1(B) =====
Candidate	Party	Votes	%
Karbir Shahi	CPN (UML)	15,185	57.96
Deepak Jang Shah	Nepali Congress	10,360	39.54
Others		655	2.50
Total		26,200	100.00
Valid votes		26,200	92.98
Invalid/blank votes		1,979	7.02
Total votes		28,179	100.00
Registered voters/turnout		38,465	73.26
Majority		4,825	
CPN (UML) gain			
Source: Election Commission

==== 2013 Constituent Assembly election ====
Candidate	Party	Votes	%
Shakti Bahadur Basnet	UCPN (Maoist)	8,073	31.06
Dambar Bahadur Singh	CPN (UML)	7,553	29.06
Deepak Jung Shah	Nepali Congress	7,317	28.15
Govinda Bikram Shah	Rastriya Prajatantra Party	1,840	7.08
Others		1,211	4.66
Total		25,994	100.00
Valid votes		25,994	95.62
Invalid/blank votes		1,191	4.38
Total votes		27,185	100.00
Registered voters/turnout		32,965	82.47
Majority		520	
UCPN (Maoist) hold			
Source: Election Commission

=== Election in the 2000s ===
==== 2008 Constituent Assembly election ====
Candidate	Party	Votes	%
Kali Bahadur Malla	CPN (Maoist)	19,009	54.35
Rita Rawal	CPN (UML)	6,223	17.79
Chinta Kumari Wagle	Nepali Congress	5,838	16.69
Govinda Bikram Shah	Rastriya Prajatantra Party	2,908	8.31
Others		996	2.85
Total		34,974	100.00
Valid votes		34,974	96.21
Invalid/blank votes		1,378	3.79
Total votes		36,352	100.00
Registered voters/turnout		52,410	69.36
Majority		12,786	
CPN (Maoist) gain			
Source: Election Commission

=== Election in the 1990s ===
==== 1999 general election ====
Candidate	Party	Votes	%
Govinda Bikram Shah	Rastriya Prajatantra Party	8,452	33.51
Krishna Bahadur Shahi	CPN (UML)	7,676	30.44
Jhalak Nath Wagle	Nepali Congress	4,011	15.90
Sanat Kumar Karki	Independent	3,230	12.81
Khamba Prasad Tokaya	CPN (Marxist–Leninist)	1,067	4.23
Others		783	3.10
Total		25,219	100.00
Valid votes		25,219	97.34
Invalid/blank votes		690	2.66
Total votes		25,909	100.00
Registered voters/turnout		40,332	64.24
Majority		776	
Rastriya Prajatantra Party gain			
Source: Election Commission

==== 1994 general election ====
Candidate	Party	Votes	%
Jhalak Nath Wagle	Nepali Congress	7,636	35.59
Tej Bikram Shah	Rastriya Prajatantra Party	6,849	31.92
Gopal Rokaya	CPN (UML)	3,500	16.31
Balram Shah	Independent	3,469	16.17
Total		21,454	100.00
Majority		787	
Nepali Congress hold			
Source: Election Commission

==== 1991 general election ====
Candidate	Party	Votes	%
Dwarika Prasad Pradhan	Nepali Congress	5,033	53.28
-	Rastriya Prajatantra Party (Thapa)	4,413	46.72
Total		9,446	100.00
Majority		620	
Nepali Congress gain			

== See also ==
- List of parliamentary constituencies of Nepal
