= Mahendra Bahadur Shahi cabinet =

Chief minister of Karnali Province

- 1st Cabinet of Karnali Province
- Date formed: 16 February 2018
- Date dissolved: 1 November 2021

People and organisations
- Head of state: Govinda Kalauni (as Governor of Karnali Province)
- Head of government: Mahendra Bahadur Shahi
- No. of ministers: 6
- Ministers removed: 1
- Member parties: CPN-Maoist Centre; Nepali Congress; CPN (Unified Socialist)
- Status in legislature: Coalition Government
- Opposition party: CPN (UML)
- Opposition leader: Yam Lal Kandel

History
- Outgoing formation: Jeevan Bahadur Shahi cabinet
- Election: 2017
- Legislature term: 5 years
- Predecessor: Province established

Mahendra Bahadur Shahi was sworn in as Chief Minister of Karnali Province on 16 February 2018. Here is the list of ministers.

== Ministries ==
Sl No.	Name	Constituency (PR if blank)	Portfolio	Political Party	Took office	Left office
1	Mahendra Bahadur Shahi	Kalikot 1(B)	Chief Minister	CPN (Maoist Centre)	16 February 2018	
2	Yagya Bahadur Budha Chhetri		Minister for Social Development	Nepali Congress	5 June 2021	
3	Amar Bahadur Thapa	Non MLA	Minister for Physical Infrastructure and Urban Development	CPN (Unified Socialist)	5 June 2021	
4	Sita Kumari Nepali		Minister for Internal Affairs and Law	CPN (Maoist Centre)	16 May 2021	
5	Dinbandhu Shrestha		Minister for Water resources and Energy Development	Nepali Congress	5 June 2021	
6	Nanda Singh Budha	Non MLA	Minister for Industry, Tourism, Forest and Environment	CPN (Unified Socialist)	18 February 2018	
7	Gopal Sharma	Western Rukum 1(B)	Minister for Economic Affairs and Planning	CPN (Maoist Centre)	16 May 2021	
8	Kurma Raj Shahi	Non MLA	Minister for Land Management, Agriculture and Co-operatives	CPN (Unified Socialist)	5 June 2021	

== Former Ministries ==
=== Til 12 May 2021 – 6 June 2021 ===
S.N.	Portfolio	Name Constituency	Political Party	Took office	Left office
Cabinet ministers
1	Office of Chief Minister and Council of Ministers	Mahendra Bahadur Shahi; MPA for Kalikot 1(B)	Maoist Centre	16 February 2018	1 November 2021
1	Minister for Social Development	Mahendra Bahadur Shahi; MPA for Kalikot 1(B)	Maoist Centre	30 April 2021	6 June 2021
1	Minister for Water resources and Energy Development	Mahendra Bahadur Shahi; MPA for Kalikot 1(B)	Maoist Centre	16 May 2021	6 June 2021
2	Minister for Industry, Tourism, Forest and Environment	Nanda Singh Budha; MPA for Dolpa 1(A)	Unified Socialist	18 April 2021	31 October 2021
3	Minister for Physical Infrastructure and Urban Development	Amar Bahadur Thapa; List MPA	Unified Socialist	16 May 2021	31 October 2021
4	Minister for Land Management, Agriculture and Co-operatives	Kurma Raj Shahi; List MPA	Unified Socialist	18 April 2021	31 October 2021
5	Minister for Internal Affairs, Law Youth and Sports	Sita Kumari Nepali	Maoist Centre	16 May 2021	1 November 2021
6	Minister for Economic Affairs and Planning	Gopal Sharma; MPA for Western Rukum 1(B)	Maoist Centre	16 May 2021	1 November 2021

=== Til 30 April 2021 – 12 May 2021 ===
S.N.	Portfolio	Name Constituency	Political Party	Took office	Left office
Cabinet ministers
1	Office of Chief Minister and Council of Ministers	Mahendra Bahadur Shahi; MPA for Kalikot 1(B)	Maoist Centre	16 February 2018	1 November 2021
1	Minister for Social Development	Mahendra Bahadur Shahi; MPA for Kalikot 1(B)	Maoist Centre	30 April 2021	
2	Minister for Internal Affairs and Law	Naresh Bhandari; MPA for Jumla 1(A)	Maoist Centre	18 February 2018	12 May 2021
3	Minister for Economic Affairs and Planning	Bimala KC; List MPA	Maoist Centre	15 April 2021	12 May 2021
4	Minister for Industry, Tourism, Forest and Environment	Nanda Singh Budha; MPA for Dolpa 1(A)	Unified Socialist	18 April 2021	31 October 2021
5	Minister for Physical Infrastructure	Amar Bahadur Thapa; List MPA	Unified Socialist	18 April 2021	16 May 2021
6	Minister for Land Management, Agriculture and Co-operatives	Kurma Raj Shahi; List MPA	Unified Socialist	18 April 2021	31 October 2021

=== Til 18 April – 30 April 2021 ===
S.N.	Portfolio	Name Constituency	Political Party	Took office	Left office
Cabinet ministers
1	Office of Chief Minister and Council of Ministers	Mahendra Bahadur Shahi; MPA for Kalikot 1(B)	Maoist Centre	16 February 2018	1 November 2021
1	Minister for Physical Infrastructure and Development	Mahendra Bahadur Shahi; MPA for Kalikot 1(B)	Maoist Centre	15 August 2019	18 April 2021
2	Minister for Internal Affairs and Law	Naresh Bhandari; MPA for Jumla 1(A)	Maoist Centre	18 February 2018	12 May 2021
2	Minister for Industry, Tourism, Forest and Environment	Naresh Bhandari; MPA for Jumla 1(A)	Maoist Centre	15 April 2021	18 April 2021
4	Minister for Land Management, Agriculture and Co-operatives	Bimala KC; List MPA	Maoist Centre	18 February 2018	18 April 2021
4	Minister of Economic Affairs and Planning	Bimala KC; List MPA	Maoist Centre	15 April 2021	12 May 2021
4	Minister for Social Development	Bimala KC; List MPA	Maoist Centre	15 April 2021	30 April 2021

=== Til 16 February 2018 – 5 April 2021 ===
S.N.	Portfolio	Name Constituency	Political Party	Took office	Left office
Cabinet ministers
1	Office of Chief Minister and Council of Ministers	Mahendra Bahadur Shahi; MPA for Kalikot 1(B)	Maoist Centre	16 February 2018	1 November 2021
1	Minister for Physical Infrastructure and Development	Mahendra Bahadur Shahi; MPA for Kalikot 1(B)	Maoist Centre	15 August 2019	18 April 2021
2	Minister for Internal Affairs and Law	Naresh Bhandari; MPA for Jumla 1(A)	Maoist Centre	18 February 2018	12 May 2021
3	Minister for Economic Affairs and Planning	Prakash Jwala; MPA for Salyan 1(B)	CPN (UML)	18 February 2018	5 April 2021
4	Minister for Land Management, Agriculture and Co-operatives	Bimala KC; List MPA	Maoist Centre	18 February 2018	18 April 201
5	Minister for Social Development	Dal Bahadur Rawal; Humla 1(A)	CPN (UML)	18 February 2018	5 April 2021
6	Minister for Physical Infrastructure Development	Khadga Bahadur Khatri; MPA for Surkhet 1(B)	CPN (UML)	18 February 2018	15 August 2019
7	Minister for Industry, Tourism, Forest and Environment	Nanda Singh Budha; MPA for Dolpa 1(A)	CPN (UML)	18 February 2018	5 April 2021

== See also ==
- Sher Dhan Rai cabinet
- Lalbabu Raut cabinet
- Astalaxmi Shakya
- Krishna Chandra Nepali cabinet
- Kul Prasad KC cabinet
- Trilochan Bhatta cabinet
