= Shahi cabinet =

Shahi cabinet may refer to:

- Mahendra Bahadur Shahi cabinet (2018), council for the Chief Minister of Nepal's Karnali Province formed on 16 February 2018
- Jeevan Bahadur Shahi cabinet (2021), council for the Chief Minister of Karnali Province formed on 3 November 2021
