= Raj Kumar Sharma cabinet =

3rd Cabinet of Karnali Province, in Nepal

- 3rd Cabinet of Karnali Province
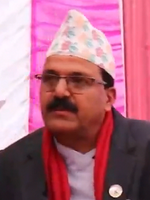
- Chief Minister Raj Kumar Sharma
- Date formed: 12 January 2023
- Date dissolved: 3 April 2024

People and organisations
- Governor: Tilak Pariyar
- Chief Minister: Raj Kumar Sharma
- No. of ministers: 3
- Member parties: Maoist Centre Coalition partners: Nepali Congress External Support: Unified Socialist; Independents Former members: CPN (UML); RPP
- Status in legislature: Provincial Assembly 30 / 40 (75%)
- Opposition party: CPN (UML)
- Opposition leader: Yam Lal Kandel

History
- Election: 2022
- Legislature term: 5 years
- Predecessor: Jeevan Bahadur Shahi cabinet

The Raj Kumar Sharma cabinet is the 3rd cabinet of Karnali Province. It was formed on 12 January 2023.

== History ==
Raj Kumar Sharma was appointed Chief minister on 12 January 2023, after the 2022 election. He secured the vote of confidence, getting 25 votes against 14 on January 20, 2023. Sharma's claim to chief minister was supported by CPN (UML), RPP, CPN (US), an Independent politician and his own party while Nepali Congress stayed in opposition. He retook vote of confidence on March 31 2023 after RPP's only MPA pulled out of supporton March 2. He again secured it with 38 votes against 1. He was only opposed by RPP. Sharma took the vote of confidence for the third time on 28 April as CPN (UML) withdrew its support on 10 April. He won the vote of confidence by securing 29 votes against 10, being opposed by CPN (UML) and RPP.

== Ministers ==
S.N.	Portfolio	Holder	Party	Constituency	Took office
Cabinet ministers
1	Chief Minister	Raj Kumar Sharma	Maoist Centre	Western Rukum 1 (B)	12 January 2023
2	Minister for Economic Affairs	Bedraj Singh	Congress	Jajarkot 1 (A)	18 April 2023
3	Minister for Physical Infrastructure, Energy and Water Resources	Mangal Bahadur Shahi	Maoist Centre	Mugu 1 (B)	12 January 2023
4	Minister for Social Development	Khadga Bahadur Pokharel	Congress	Surkhet 1 (A)	18 April 2023
5	Minister for Interior Affairs and Law	Krishna Bahadur G.C.	Maoist Centre	Surkhet 1 (B)	25 January 2023
6	Minister for Industry, Tourism, Forest and Environment	Krishna Kumar B.C.	Congress	Dailekh 1 (B)	18 April 2023
8	Minister for Land Management, Agriculture and Cooperatives	Bhim Prakash Sharma	Maoist Centre	Salyan 1 (A)	25 January 2023
8	Minister for Energy, Water Resource and Irrigation		Congress		
