= Yagya Bahadur Budha Chhetri =

Nepali politician

Honourable Yagya Bahadur Budha Chhetri
- यज्ञबहादुर बुढा क्षेत्री

Minister for Social Development of Karnali Province
- Incumbent
- Assumed office 5 June 2021
- Governor: Govinda Prasad Kalauni; Tilak Pariyar
- Chief Minister: Mahendra Bahadur Shahi; Jeevan Bahadur Shahi
- Preceded by: Dal Bahadur Rawal

Province Assembly Member of Karnali Province
- Incumbent
- Assumed office 2017
- Preceded by: Assembly Created

Personal details
- Party: Nepali Congress
- Website: mosd.karnali.gov.np

Yagya Bahadur Budha Chhetri (Nepali: यज्ञबहादुर बुढा क्षेत्री) is a Nepali politician of Nepali Congress and Minister for Social Development in Karnali government since 5 June 2021. He is also serving as member of the Karnali Province Provincial Assembly.

Chhetri was elected to the 2017 provincial assembly elections from proportional list of the party. He including one other ministers from Nepali Congress saved incumbent cabinet in vote of confidence. He joined Mahendra Bahadur Shahi cabinet on 5 June 2021 after a group of CPN (UML) withdrew support from the government. As a result of talks between the two parties Congress joined the government with two ministries. Currently, he is minister in Nepali Congress led Jeevan Bahadur Shahi.
