= Sita Kumari Nepali =

Nepalese politician

Honourable Sita Kumari Nepali
- सीता कुमारी नेपाली

Minister for Internal Affairs and Law of Karnali Province
- In office 16 May 2021 – 1 November 2021
- Governor: Govinda Prasad Kalauni
- Chief Minister: Mahendra Bahadur Shahi
- Preceded by: Naresh Bhandari
- Succeeded by: Him Bahadur Shahi

Province Assembly Member of Karnali Province
- Incumbent
- Assumed office 2017
- Preceded by: N/A
- Constituency: N/A

Personal details
- Born: January 30, 1975 (age 51)
- Party: CPN (Maoist Centre)
- Occupation: Politician

Sita Kumari Nepali (Nepali: सीता कुमारी नेपाली) is a Nepalese politician and Minister for Internal Affairs, Law and Sports of Karnali Province. She is a member of Provincial Assembly of Karnali Province belonging to the CPN (Maoist Centre). Nepali, a resident of Lekbeshi, was elected under the proportional representation (PR) category for Dalit. In 2020, she was appointed as the chief whip of the party’s provincial committee by the former Chief minister, Mahendra Bahadur Shahi of Karnali Province. She is also the spokesperson for the Karnali provincial government. In 2021, she announced that the provincial government has decided to establish mass communications academy.

== Personal life ==
Sita Kumari Nepali was born on January 30 to father Lok Bahadur Nepali and mother Shobisharaa Nepali.
