= Dakshina Shahi =

Nepalese politician

- दक्षिणा शाही

Member of the Karnali Provincial Assembly
- Incumbent
- Assumed office 26 December 2022

Personal details
- Born: 4 October 1987 (age 38)
- Party: Communist Party of Nepal (Unified Marxist–Leninist)
- Other political affiliations: Nepal Communist Party

Dakshina Shahi (born 4 October 1987, Nepali: दक्षिणा शाही) is a Nepalese politician, belonging to the Communist Party of Nepal (Unified Marxist–Leninist) Party. She is currently serving as a member of the 2nd Karnali Provincial Assembly. In the 2022 Nepalese provincial election She was elected as a proportional representative from the Khas people category.
