= Speaker of the Karnali Provincial Assembly =

Presiding officer of the Karnali Provincial Assembly

Speaker of the Karnali Pradesh Sabha
- कर्णाली प्रदेशको सभामुख
- Incumbent; Nanda Gurung since 15 January 2023
- Karnali Provincial Assembly
- Style: The Hon’ble
- Member of: Karnali Provincial Assembly
- Appointer: Members of the Karnali Provincial Assembly
- Term length: During the life of the Pradesh Sabha (five years maximum)
- Constituting instrument: Constitution of Nepal
- Inaugural holder: Raj Bahadur Shahi
- Formation: 11 February 2018 (8 years ago)

The Speaker of the Karnali Provincial Assembly is the presiding officer (chair) of the Provincial Assembly of Karnali Province. The speaker is elected generally in the first meeting of the Karnali Provincial Assembly following provincial elections. Serving for a term of five years, the speaker is chosen from sitting members of the assembly.

The position of Speaker holds significant importance in the assembly process, presiding over the proceedings, maintaining order, and ensuring fair debate and discussion. The current speaker is Nanda Gurung since 15 January 2023.

== Qualification ==
The Constitution of Nepal sets the qualifications required to become eligible for the office of the Speaker and Deputy Speaker. A Speaker and Deputy Speaker must meet the qualifications to become a member of the provincial assembly. A member of the provincial assembly must be:

- One who is a citizen of Nepal;
- One who is a voter of the concerned Province;
- One who has completed the age of twenty-five years;
- One who is not convicted of a criminal offense involving moral turpitude;
- One who is not disqualified by any law; and
- One who is not holding any office of profit.

== List of Speakers ==
No.	Name Constituency	Term of office			Assembly (election)	Party	Ref
No.	Name Constituency	Took office	Left office	Term	Assembly (election)	Party	Ref
1	Raj Bahadur Shahi; MPA for Dailekh 2 (B)	11 February 2018	18 September 2022	4 years, 219 days	1st (2018)	CPN (Unified Marxist-Leninist)	
2	Nanda Gurung; List MPA	15 January 2023	Incumbent	3 years, 236 days	2nd (2023)	CPN (Unified Marxist-Leninist)	

== See also ==
- Speaker of the Koshi Provincial Assembly
- Speaker of the Bagmati Provincial Assembly
- Speaker of the Gandaki Provincial Assembly
- Speaker of the Lumbini Provincial Assembly
- Speaker of the Sudurpashchim Provincial Assembly
