= Yashoda Neupane =

Nepalese politician

Honourable Yashoda Neupane
- यसोदा न्यौपाने

Deputy Speaker of the Karnali Provincial Assembly
- Incumbent
- Assumed office 18 January 2023
- Governor: Tilak Pariyar; Yagya Raj Joshi
- Chief Minister: Yam Lal Kandel
- Speaker: Nanda Gurung
- Preceded by: Pushpa Gharti (Bista)

Member of the Karnali Provincial Assembly
- Incumbent
- Assumed office 26 December 2022

Personal details
- Born: 19 August 1983 (age 42)
- Party: Communist Party of Nepal (Maoist Centre)
- Other political affiliations: Nepal Communist Party
- Spouse: Lakshmi Prasad Chaulagai
- Parents: Dhananjay Neupane (father); Dhanrupa Neupane (mother)

Yashoda Neupane (Nepali: यसोदा न्यौपाने) is a Nepalese politician and currently serving as the deputy speaker of the Karnali Provincial Assembly. She is also serving as a member of the 2nd Karnali Provincial Assembly. In the 2022 Nepalese provincial election she was elected as a proportional representative from the Khas people category.
