= Tulasa Malla =

Nepalese politician

Honourable Tulasa Malla
- तुलसा मल्ल

Member of the Karnali Provincial Assembly
- Incumbent
- Assumed office 26 December 2022

Personal details
- Born: 28 March 1969 (age 57)
- Party: Communist Party of Nepal (Unified Marxist–Leninist)
- Other political affiliations: Nepal Communist Party
- Parents: Datta Bahadur Malla (father); Usha Devi Malla (mother)

Tulasa Malla (Nepali: तुलसा मल्ल) is a Nepalese politician, belonging to the Communist Party of Nepal (Unified Marxist–Leninist) Party. Malla is currently serving as a member of the 2nd Karnali Provincial Assembly. In the 2022 Nepalese provincial election She was elected as a proportional representative from the Khas people category.
