= Kal Bahadur Hamal =

Nepalese politician

Honourable Kal Bahadur Hamal
- कलबहादुर हमाल

Member of the Karnali Provincial Assembly
- Incumbent
- Assumed office 26 December 2022

Personal details
- Born: 25 March 1962 (age 64)
- Party: Communist Party of Nepal (Unified Marxist–Leninist)
- Other political affiliations: Nepal Communist Party
- Spouse: Pultisara Hamal
- Parents: Debikhar Upadhyay (father); Nandasara Upadhyay (mother)

Kal Bahadur Hamal (Nepali: कलबहादुर हमाल) is a Nepalese politician, belonging to the Communist Party of Nepal (Unified Marxist–Leninist) Party. He is currently serving as a member of the 2nd Karnali Provincial Assembly. In the 2022 Nepalese provincial election he was elected as a proportional representative from the Khas people category.
