= Gulab Jung Shah =

Nepalese politician

Honourable Gulab Jung Shah
- गुलावजँग शाह

Province Assembly Member of Karnali Province
- Incumbent
- Assumed office 2017
- Preceded by: N/A
- Constituency: Salyan 1(A)

Personal details
- Party: CPN (UML)
- Occupation: Politician

Gulab Jung Shah (Nepali: गुलावजँग शाह) is a Nepalese politician from Karnali Province. He is a member of Provincial Assembly of Karnali Province belonging to the CPN (UML). Shah, a resident of Bangad Kupinde, was elected via 2017 Nepalese provincial elections from Salyan 1(A) constituency. He was appointed the Chief Whip of CPN (UML) and also the party co-incharge for Salyan District, Nepal since 2019. Later, the ruling parliamentary party leader and former Chief minister of Karnali Province, Mahendra Bahadur Shahi has removed him as the party's chief whip in 2020.

== Electoral history ==
=== 2017 Nepalese provincial elections ===
| Party | Candidate | Votes |
|---|---|---|
| CPN (Unified Marxist–Leninist) | Gulab Jung Shah | 19,658 |
| Nepali Congress | Ek Raj Dangi | 10,612 |
| Independent | Bheem Prakash Sharma | 7,416 |
| CPN (Marxist–Leninist) | Top Bahadur Roka | 1,173 |
| Rastriya Janamorcha | Dale Budha Magar | 131 |
| Result | CPN (UML) gain | |
Source: Election Commission
