= Gyanendra Shahi =

Nepalese politician

Honourable Gyan Bahadur Shahi
- ज्ञानबहादुर शाही
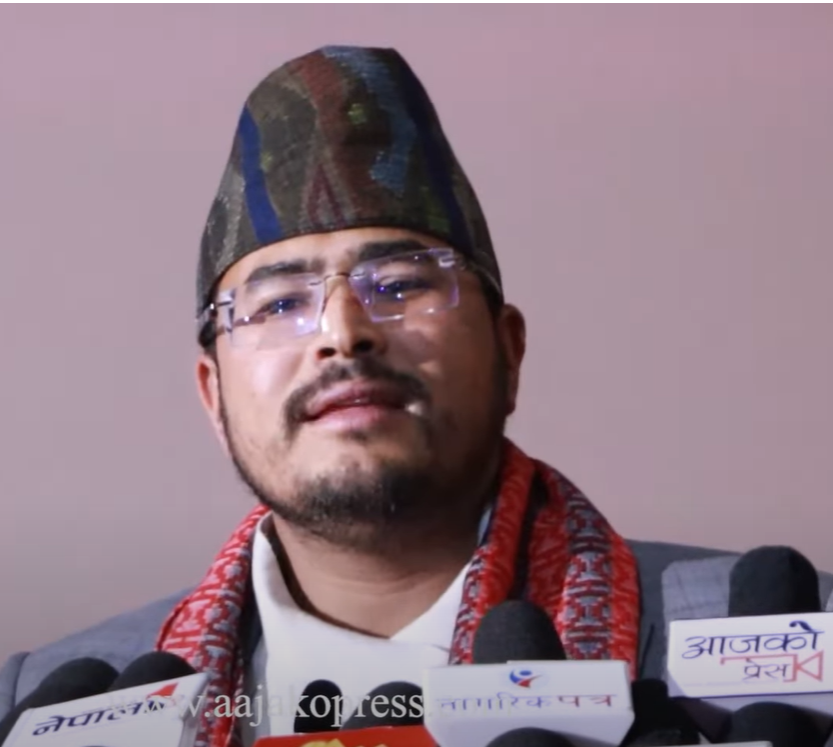
- Shahi in 2023

Member of the House of Representatives
- Incumbent
- Assumed office 26 March 2026
- Preceded by: Himself
- Constituency: Jumla 1
- In office 22 December 2022 – 12 September 2025
- Preceded by: Gajendra Bahadur Mahat
- Succeeded by: Himself
- Constituency: Jumla 1

Personal details
- Born: 7 February 1992 (age 34) Jumla District, Nepal
- Party: Rastriya Prajatantra Party (2022 – present)

Gyan Bahadur Shahi (Nepali: ज्ञानबहादुर शाही), popularly known as Gyanendra Shahi (ज्ञानेन्द्र शाही), is a Nepalese politician and a member of the 2nd Federal Parliament of Nepal. He is currently serving as a spokesperson of Rastriya Prajatantra Party. He was elected to the House of Representatives from Jumla 1 in the 2022 election and was re-elected in the 2026 election.

== Political career ==
Shahi joined Rastriya Prajatantra Party as a central committee member and spokesperson on 18 February 2022. He was elected from Jumla 1 as a member of parliament on 22 December 2023, by more than 53 percent of votes. He was appointed as the chief whip of the parliamentary party at the 6th House of Representatives.

Shahi was re-elected from Jumla 1 at the 2026 general election and was the only directly elected MP from the Rastriya Prajatantra Party. He was appointed as the party'rs parliamentary party leader at the 7th House of Representatives.

== Electoral history ==
Election	House	Constituency	Party	Votes	Result
2022	House of Representatives	Jumla 1	RPP	22,819	Elected
2026	House of Representatives	Jumla 1	RPP	14,816	Elected
