= Him Bahadur Shahi =

Nepali politician (1945/1946–2026)

Honourable Him Bahadur Shahi
- हिम बहादुर शाही

Minister for Internal Affairs and Law of Karnali Province
- In office 6 February 2022 – 16 September 2026
- Governor: Tilak Pariyar
- Chief Minister: Jeevan Bahadur Shahi
- Preceded by: Sita Kumari Nepali

Province Assembly Member of Karnali Province
- In office 2017 – 16 September 2026
- Preceded by: Assembly Created

Personal details
- Born: 1945 or 1946 Dailekh, Nepal
- Died: 16 September 2026 (aged 80) Kalagaun, Achham, Nepal
- Party: Nepali Congress
- Website: moial.karnali.gov.np

Him Bahadur Shahi (Nepali: हिम बहादुर शाही; 1945 or 1946 – 16 September 2026) was a Nepali politician of the Nepali Congress and Minister for Social Development in the Karnali government from 6 February 2022. He also served as member of the Karnali Province Provincial Assembly.

Shahi was elected to the assembly in the 2017 provincial assembly elections through proportional list of the party. Currently, he is the Minister for Internal Affairs and Law in Nepali Congress led Jeevan Bahadur Shahi government.

Shahi died on 16 September 2026, at the age of 80.
