= Santoshi Shahi =

Nepalese politician

Honourable Santoshi Shahi
- सन्तोषी शाही

Member of the Karnali Provincial Assembly
- Incumbent
- Assumed office 26 December 2022
- Constituency: PR list

Personal details
- Born: 1 April 1983 (age 43)
- Party: Rastriya Prajatantra Party
- Other political affiliations: Rastriya Prajatantra Party
- Spouse: Dambar Bahadur Shahi
- Parents: Parakram Singh (father); Sabitra Singh (mother)

Santoshi Shahi (Nepali: सन्तोषी शाही) is a Nepalese politician, belonging to the Rastriya Prajatantra Party. She is currently serving as a member of the 2nd Karnali Provincial Assembly. In the 2022 Nepalese provincial election she was elected as a proportional representative from the Khas people category.
