= Nanda Gurung =

Nepalese politician

Honourable Nanda Gurung
- नन्दा गुरुङ्ग

Speaker of the Karnali Provincial Assembly
- Incumbent
- Assumed office 15 January 2023
- Governor: Tilak Pariyar; Yagya Raj Joshi
- Chief Minister: Yam Lal Kandel
- Deputy: Yashoda Neupane
- Preceded by: Raj Bahadur Shahi

Member of the Karnali Provincial Assembly
- Incumbent
- Assumed office 26 December 2022

Personal details
- Born: 14 February 1967 (age 59) Narayan, Dailekh
- Party: Communist Party of Nepal (Unified Marxist–Leninist)
- Other political affiliations: Nepal Communist Party
- Spouse: Dharma Bahadur Gurung
- Parents: Lal Bahadur Gurung (father); Kumari Gurung (mother)

Nanda Gurung (Nepali: नन्दा गुरुङ्ग) is a Nepalese politician and currently serving as the 2nd Speaker of the Karnali Provincial Assembly. Gurung is the first female Provincial Speaker of Nepal.

She is currently serving as a member of the 2nd Koshi Provincial Assembly. In the 2022 Nepalese provincial election she was elected as a proportional representative from the indigenous people category.
