= Dinbandhu Shrestha =

Nepali politician

Honourable Dinbandhu Shrestha
- दिनबंधु श्रेष्ठ

Minister for Water Resoource and Energy of Karnali Province
- Incumbent
- Assumed office 5 June 2021
- Governor: Govinda Prasad Kalauni

Province Assembly Member of Karnali Province
- Incumbent
- Assumed office 2017
- Preceded by: Assembly Created

Personal details
- Party: Nepali Congress
- Website: karnali.gov.np

Dinbandhu Shrestha (Nepali: दिनबंधु श्रेष्ठ) is a Nepali politician of Nepali Congress and Minister for Water Resource and Energy in Karnali government since 5 June 2021. He is also serving as member of the Karnali Province Provincial Assembly. Shrestha was elected to the 2017 provincial assembly elections from proportional list of the party. He including one other ministers from Nepali Congress saved incumbent cabinet in vote of confidence. He joined Mahendra Bahadur Shahi cabinet on 5 June 2021 after a group of CPN(UML) withdrew support from the government. As a result of talks between the two parties Congress Joined the government with two ministries.
