= Sher Bahadur Budha =

Nepalese politician

- शेरबहादुर बुढा

Minister for Physical Infrastructure and Urban Development of Karnali Province
- Incumbent
- Assumed office 30 April 2024
- Governor: Yagya Raj Joshi
- Chief Minister: Yam Lal Kandel

Personal details
- Born: 26 June 1977 (age 48) Dolpa, Nepal
- Party: Communist Party of Nepal
- Parents: Phaji Budha (father); Anju Budha (mother)

Sher Bahadur Budha (Nepali: शेरबहादुर बुढा) is a Nepalese politician under the Communist Party of Nepal who serves as the Minister for Physical Infrastructure and Urban Development of Karnali Province.

He has also served as a member of the Karnali Provincial Assembly in the 2022 Nepalese provincial elections, representing Dolpa 1 (A) constituency.
