= Raj Kumar Sharma =

Nepalese social activist and politician

- राज कुमार शर्मा
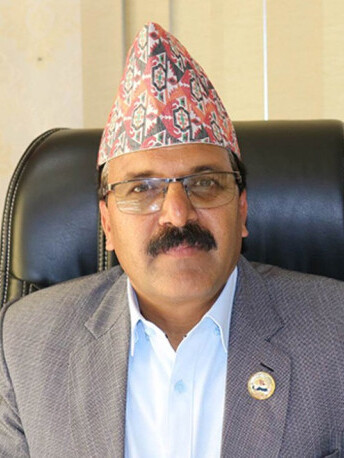
- Sharma in 2024

Chief Minister of Karnali Province
- In office 12 January 2023 – 3 April 2024
- President: Ram Chandra Poudel
- Governor: Tilak Pariyar
- Preceded by: Jeevan Bahadur Shahi
- Succeeded by: Yam Lal Kandel

Leader of the Opposition in the Karnali Provincial Assembly
- In office 22 July 2024 – 18 April 2026
- Chief Minister: Yam Lal Kandel
- Preceded by: Jeevan Bahadur Shahi
- Succeeded by: Mangal Bahadur Shahi

Member of the Karnali Provincial Assembly
- In office 26 December 2022 – 28 September 2026
- Preceded by: Gopal Sharma
- Constituency: Western Rukum 1 (B)

Personal details
- Born: 4 October 1971 (age 55) Nuwakot, Nepal
- Other political affiliations: Communist Party of Nepal (Maoist Centre)
- Spouse: Pratibha K.C
- Parents: Tika Ram Sharma (father); Yashoda Sharma (mother)

Raj Kumar Sharma (Nepali: राज कुमार शर्मा is a Nepalese politician who served as the chief minister of Karnali Province. He was the Parliamentary party leader of the CPN (Maoist Centre) and the leader of the opposition in the Provincial Assembly, and previously served as member of the Karnali Provincial Assembly from Western Rukum 1 (B) constituency.

== Personal life and education ==
Raj Kumar Sharma was born as the youngest of six children to father Tika Ram Sharma and mother Yashoda Sharma on October 4, 1971, in Nuwakot VDC, Kingdom of Nepal. He is married to Pratibha K.C. and has one daughter. Sharma completed his formal education up to the Secondary School Level (Grade 10).

== Political career ==
Sharma's political career began in 1984 when he joined the All Nepal National Free Students Union (ANNFSU) while studying in school. After hosting a regional student conference at his home that year, he joined the opposition against the monarchy. He later became a full-time worker by joining the village struggles in Rukum and Rolpa to prepare for the People's War. He moved to the district headquarters in Musikot and became a member of the student committee. He got his main party membership in CPN (Mashal) in 1989 and he entered politics full-time from 1950.

In 1991, when different communist groups joined to form the CPN (Unity Centre), Sharma led local public service, village development, and anti-corruption struggles under the open front name Janamorcha. In 1993, he played an important role by running a 45-day armed military training camp in Mahat's Fulbari forest to prepare for the war. When the People's War officially started on February 13, 1996, Sharma helped lead the attack that captured the Radio police post in Rukum. Later in 1996, he commanded the main assault team during the attack on the Triveni outpost in Dolpa, where his commander Daulat Ram Gharti (Vijay Ghale) was killed.

From 1997, Sharma led military commands in Karnali, working in Mugu and Dolpa after 2001, and in Dailekh after the 2004 peace process during a counter-offensive against the Maoists, while also serving as District Secretary and District In-charge in Jumla, Kalikot, Mugu, Dolpa, Humla, and Dailekh at various times. During the peace process, he was appointed Chief of the Tharuhat State, and after that he has served as the Central Publicity Department in 2010, head of the District Coordination Committee in Western Rukum District in 2017, In-charge of District Committee and chairman of the Provincial Committee in 2021.

In 2022 Nepalese provincial election, he won the Western Rukum 1 (B) with a margin of 12,082 votes by defeating UML's Karna Bahadur Gharti Magar.

== Chief ministership (2023–2024) ==
Sharma taking the oath of office as the chief minister of Karnali Province, with Governor Tilak Pariyar administering the oath

Raj Kumar Sharma was appointed as the Chief Minister of Karnali Province on January 11, 2023, by Governor Tilak Pariyar under a power-sharing agreement between the CPN (Maoist Centre) and CPN (UML), and took his official oath of office on January 12, 2023.

After taking office, he won his first vote of confidence on January 20, 2023, with 25 votes in favor and 14 against. Soon after, the RPP party withdrew its support, forcing him to take a second vote of confidence on March 31, 2023, which he won with 38 votes in favor and 1 against. Afterward, the CPN (UML) withdrew its support and left the government on April 9, 2023, which led the Nepali Congress to join his government. On April 28, 2023, he won his third vote of confidence, where out of 39 participating MPs, 29 voted in favor and 10 voted against. On March 5, 2024, the Nepali Congress withdrew its support, leaving his government with a minority.

Sharma resigned on April 3, 2024. Following a central power-sharing agreement between the CPN (Maoist Centre) and CPN (UML) where the UML was allocated the chief ministership of Karnali Province, Yam Lal Kandel became the Chief Minister.

== Electoral history ==
=== 2022 provincial election ===
==== Western Rukum 1(B) ====
Candidate	Party	Votes	%
Rajkumar Sharma	CPN (Maoist Centre)	20,160	68.70
Karna Bahadur Gharti Magar	CPN (UML)	8,078	27.53
Nirjal K.C.	Rastriya Prajatantra Party	1,107	3.77
Total		29,345	100.00
Majority		12,082	
CPN (Maoist Centre) hold			

Political offices
Preceded by Jeevan Bahadur Shahi	Chief Minister of Karnali Province; 2023 – 2024	Succeeded by Yam Lal Kandel
