= Ghanashyam Bhandari =

Nepalese politician

- घनश्याम भण्डारी

Minister for Social Development of Karnali Province
- In office 4 August 2024 – 15 July 2026
- Governor: Yagya Raj Joshi
- Chief Minister: Yam Lal Kandel
- Preceded by: Bir Bahadur Shahi

Member of the Karnali Provincial Assembly
- Incumbent
- Assumed office 26 December 2022
- Preceded by: Sushil Kumar Thapa
- Constituency: Dailekh 2(A)

Mayor of Dullu Municipality
- In office 18 May 2017 – 19 May 2022
- Deputy: Bishnu Thapa
- Preceded by: Municipality established
- Succeeded by: Bharat Prasad Rijal

Personal details
- Born: 28 June 1983 (age 43) Dullu, Dailekh
- Party: Nepali Congress
- Parents: Purna Bahadur Bhandari (father); Candrā Bhandari (mother)
- Education: Masters in Accounting

Ghanashyam Bhandari (Nepali: घनश्याम भण्डारी; born 28 June 1983) is a Nepalese politician, belonging to the Nepali Congress. He had served as the Minister for Social Development of Karnali Province from August 2024 to July 2026. Bhandari also serves as a member of the Karnali Provincial Assembly and was elected from Dailekh 2(A) constituency. He previously served as the Mayor of Dullu Municipality from 2017 to 2022.
