= Gamata Bishwakarma =

Nepalese politician

- गमाता विश्वकर्मा

Minister of State for Physical Infrastructure and Urban Development of Karnali Province
- Incumbent
- Assumed office 30 April 2024
- Governor: Yagya Raj Joshi
- Chief Minister: Yam Lal Kandel

Personal details
- Born: 22 April 1973 (age 52) Nepal
- Party: Communist Party of Nepal
- Parents: Ude Kami (father); Kokila Kami (mother)

Gamata Bishwakarma (Nepali: गमाता विश्वकर्मा) is a Nepalese politician under the Communist Party of Nepal who serves as the Minister of State for Physical Infrastructure and Urban Development of Karnali Province.

She is currently serving as a member of the 2nd Karnali Provincial Assembly . In the 2022 Nepalese provincial election, she was elected as a proportional representative from the dalit people category.
