= Jeevan Bahadur Shahi cabinet =

- 2nd Cabinet of Karnali Province
- Date formed: 3 November 2021

People and organisations
- Head of government: Jeevan Bahadur Shahi
- No. of ministers: 2
- Total no. of members: 2
- Member parties: Nepali Congress; Collision partners: CPN (Maoist Centre); CPN (Unified Socialist); External support: Rastriya Prajatantra Party
- Status in legislature: Majority government
- Opposition party: CPN(UML)
- Opposition leader: Yam Lal Kandel

History
- Election: 2017
- Legislature term: 5 years
- Predecessor: Mahendra Bahadur Shahi cabinet

The Jeevan Bahadur Shahi cabinet is the council assembled by Jeevan Bahadur Shahi, who was sworn in as Chief Minister of Karnali Province on 3 November 2021. This government was supported by CPN(Maoist-Centre) and CPN (Unified Socialist).

== Chief Minister and Cabinet Ministers ==
S.N.	Portfolio	Holder	Party	Took office
Cabinet ministers
1	Chief Minister	Jeevan Bahadur Shahi	Nepali Congress	2 November 2021
2	Minister for Economic Affairs and Planning	Binda Man Bista	CPN (Maoist Centre)	30 November 2021
3	Minister for Land Management, Agriculture and Cooperatives	Chandra Bahadur Shahi	CPN (Unified Socialist)	16 November 2021
4	Minister for Industry, Tourism, Forest and Environment	Karchen Lama	CPN (Maoist Centre)	6 February 2021
5	Minister for Social Development	Yagya Bahadur Budha Chhetri	Nepali Congress	6 February 2021
6	Minister for Physical Infrastructure and Urban Development	Padam Bahadur Rokaya	CPN (Unified Socialist)	6 February 2021
7	Minister for Internal Affairs and Law	Him Bahadur Shahi	Nepali Congress	6 February 2021
8	Minister for Water Resource and Energy Development	Ganesh Prasad Singh	CPN (Maoist Centre)	6 February 2021

== Member by party ==
Representation of cabinet ministers by party
1. Nepali Congress (37.5%)
2. CPN (Maoist Centre) (37.5%)
3. Communist Party of Nepal (Unified Socialist) (25%)

Party	Cabinet Ministers	Ministers of State	Total Ministers
Nepali Congress	3	0	3
CPN (Maoist Centre)	3	0	3
CPN (Unified Socialist)	2	0	1

== See also ==
- Rajendra Kumar Rai cabinet
- Lalbabu Raut cabinet
- Rajendra Prasad Pandey cabinet
- Krishna Chandra Nepali Cabinet
- Kul Prasad KC cabinet
- Trilochan Bhatta cabinet
