= Janardan Sharma =

Nepali politician

Honourable Janardan Sharma
- जनार्दन शर्मा
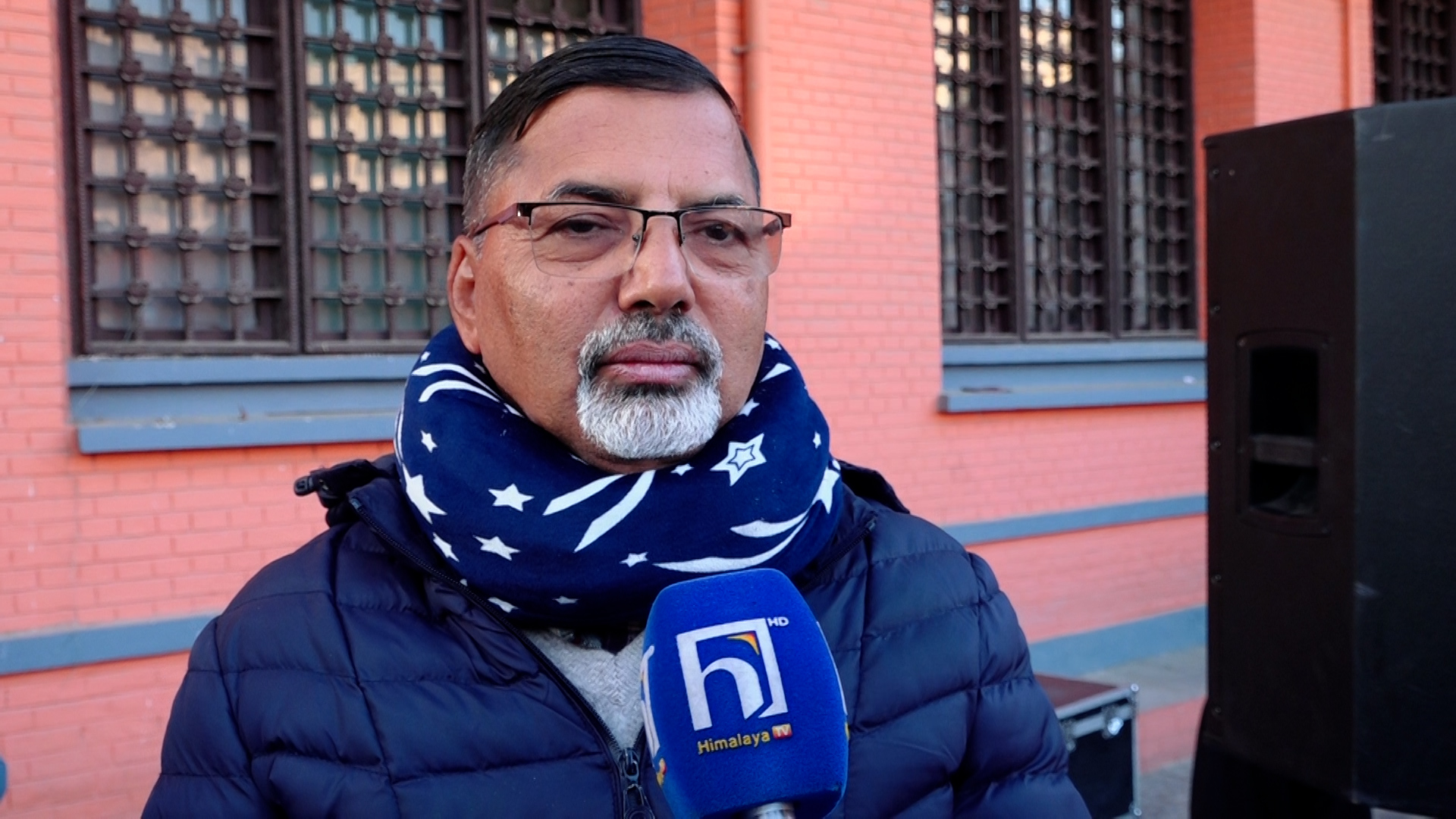
- Sharma in 2024

Finance Minister of Nepal
- In office 13 July 2022 – 26 December 2022
- President: Bidhya Devi Bhandari
- Prime Minister: Pushpa Kamal Dahal
- Succeeded by: Bishnu Poudel

Minister for Home Affairs
- In office 7 June 2017 – 17 October 2017
- Prime Minister: Sher Bahadur Deuba
- Preceded by: Bimalendra Nidhi
- Succeeded by: Sher Bahadur Deuba

Minister for Energy
- In office 14 August 2016 – 31 May 2017
- Prime Minister: Pushpa Kamal Dahal
- Succeeded by: Mahendra Bahadur Shahi

Minister for Peace and Reconstruction
- In office 31 August 2008 – May 2009
- Prime Minister: Pushpa Kamal Dahal

Member of Parliament, Pranitidhi Sabha
- Incumbent
- Assumed office 4 March 2018
- Preceded by: Constituency established
- Constituency: Western Rukum 1

Member of Constituent Assembly
- In office 28 May 2008 – 14 October 2017
- Preceded by: Tirtha Gautam
- Succeeded by: Constituency abolished
- Constituency: Rukum 2

Personal details
- Born: 25 April 1963 (age 63) Rukum, Nepal
- Party: Pragatisheel Loktantrik Party
- Other political affiliations: Nepal Communist Party (2018-2021); CPN (Maoist Centre) (1995-2018, 2021 - present)
- Website: Official website

Janardan Sharma Prabhakar (Note: Nepali: जनार्दन शर्मा प्रभाक) (born 15 April 1963) is a Nepali politician who is the leader of the Pragatisheel Loktantrik Party (PLP). He was former Finance and Home Minister of Nepal. He is widely remembered for his tenure as Energy minister when he ended loadshedding, which had been occurring for up to 18 hours per day.

A four-time parliamentarian and joint general secretary of CPN (Maoist Centre), Sharma was the single leader to have been elected from same constituency for four consecutive terms within CPN (Maoist Centre) till he announced his own Progressive Campaign, Nepal under support of leaders including former minister Sudan Kirati and Ram Karki. Sharma was a leader of the CPN (Maoist Centre) during the insurgency period and served as one of the 4 deputy commanders of the Nepali People's Liberation Army.

== Political life ==
One among the four deputy commanders of People's Liberation Army, Nepal, Sharma is well known for his strong holds in Karnali region while he bagged four consecutive wins from Western Rukum 1 (constituency) while within CPN (Maoist Centre) party.

Sharma has previously been Minister of Home Affairs, Energy and Peace and Reconstruction of Nepal. He is known for his tenure as Energy minister when he significantly reduced loadshedding, which had been occurring for up to 18 hours per day.

== Electoral history ==
Election	House	Constituency	Party	Votes	Opponent	Party	Votes	Result
2008	Constituent Assembly	Rukum-2	Maoist Centre	30,270	Prem Prakash Oli	Nepali Congress	9,250	Elected
2013	Constituent Assembly	Rukum-2	Maoist Centre	22,575	Gopal Jee Jung Shah	Nepali Congress	12,599	Elected
2017	House of Representatives	Western Rukum 1	Maoist Centre	34,402	Gopal Jee Jung Shah	Nepali Congress	15,659	Elected
2022	House of Representatives	Western Rukum 1	Maoist Centre	39,549	Nandaram Devkota	CPN (UML)	12,961	Elected

=== 2022 Budget controversy ===
Sharma was accused of changing tax rates inviting unauthorized persons a day before budget for the next fiscal year was announced. Annapurna Post first broke the news. He later resigned. Parliamentary Probe Special Committee was formed to investigate the controversy. The committee concluded that they could not confirm the allegations about Sharma inviting outsiders to change the tax rates. He was later re-appointed as Finance Minister.

== See also ==
- Pragatisheel Loktantrik Party
