= Padam Bahadur Rokaya =

Nepalese politician

Honourable Padam Bahadur Rokaya
- पदमबहादुर रोकाया

Minister for Physical Infrastructure and Urban Development of Karnali Province
- Incumbent
- Assumed office 6 February 2021
- Governor: Tilak Pariyar
- Chief Minister: Jeevan Bahadur Shahi
- Preceded by: Amar Bahadur Thapa

Province Assembly Member of Karnali Province
- Incumbent
- Assumed office 2017
- Preceded by: N/A
- Constituency: Jumla 1(B)

Personal details
- Party: CPN (Unified Socialist)
- Occupation: Politician

Padam Bahadur Rokaya (Nepali: पदमबहादुर रोकाया) is a Nepalese politician and Minister for Physical Infrastructure and Urban Development of Karnali Province. He is also a member of Provincial Assembly of Karnali Province belonging to the CPN (Unified Socialist). Rokaya, a resident of Kankasundari Rural Municipality, was elected via 2017 Nepalese provincial elections from Jumla 1(B). Earlier, he was a party candidate with the CPN-UML back in 2017. At present, he is a party candidate from the CPN (Unified Socialist).

== Electoral history ==
=== 2017 Nepalese provincial elections ===
Party	Candidate	Votes
CPN (Unified Marxist–Leninist)	Padam Bahadur Rokaya	6,414
Nepali Congress	Bhim Nidhi Hamal	5,280
Nepal Workers Peasants Party	Gorkha Bahadur Budha	1,336
Unified Rastriya Prjatantra Party (Nationalist)	Deep Chandra Chaulagain	209
Result	CPN (UML) gain	
Source: Election Commission
