= Gajendra Bahadur Mahat =

Nepalese Politician

- गजेन्द्र बहादुर महत

Member of Parliament, Pratinidhi Sabha
- Incumbent
- Assumed office 4 March 2018
- Preceded by: Lalit Jung Shahi
- Constituency: Jumla 1

Personal details
- Born: 10 April 1968 (age 57)
- Party: CPN (Maoist Centre) (since 1999)
- Other political affiliations: NMKP (1990–97); NMKP (Krantikari) (1997–99)

Gajendra Bahadur Mahat is a Nepalese Politician and serving as the Member Of House Of Representatives (Nepal) elected from Jumla-1, Province No. 6. He is member of the Communist Party of Nepal (Maoist Centre).
