= Kalikot 1 =

Parliamentary constituency in Nepal

- Parliamentary constituency for the House of Representatives
- Kalikot 1 in Karnali Province

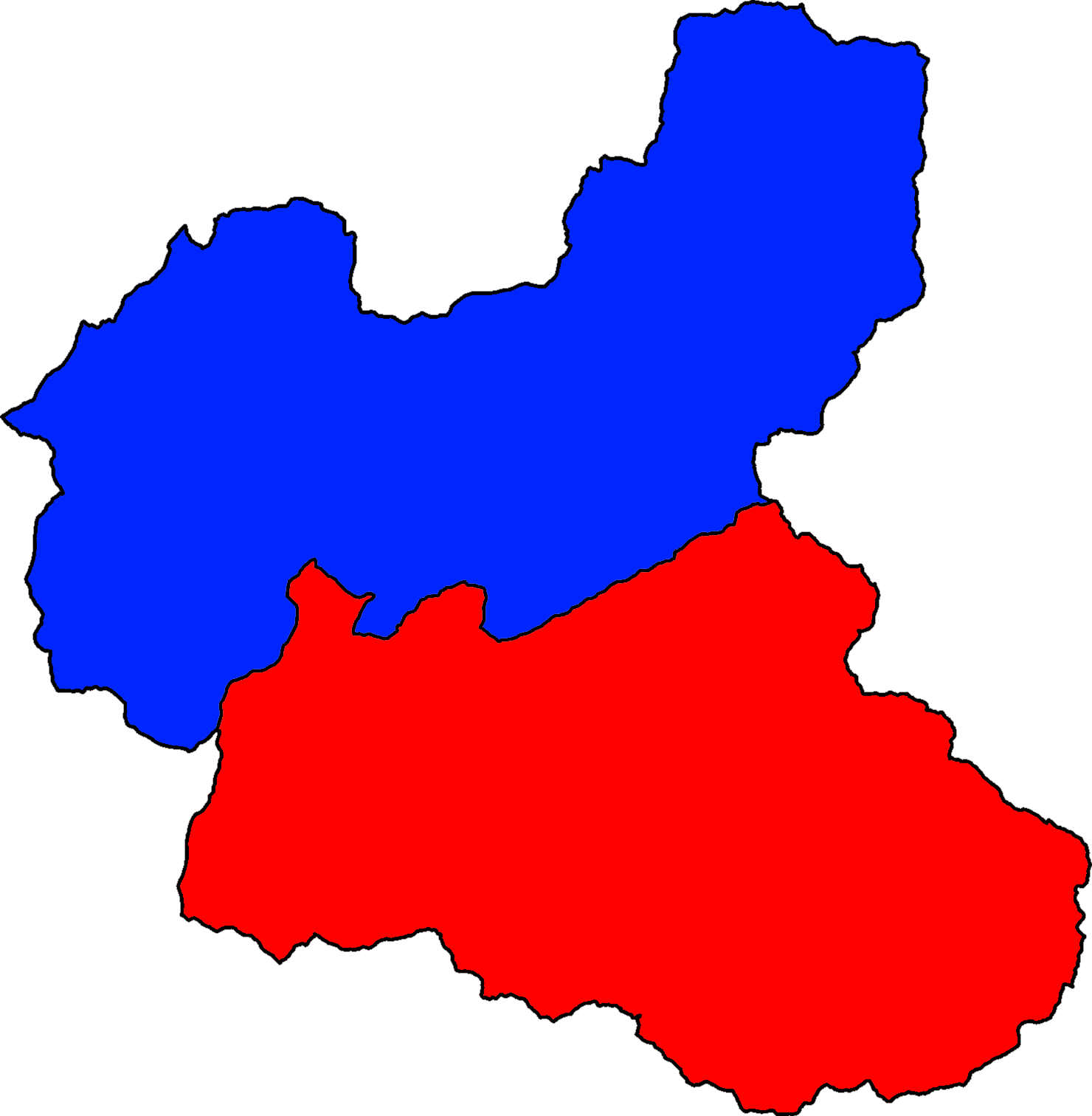
- Assembly segments Kalikot 1(A) (red) and Kalikot 1(B) (blue) within Kalikot District
- Province: Karnali Province
- District: Kalikot District
- Electorate: 64,961

Current constituency
- Created: 1991
- Number of members: 3
- Member of Parliament: Mahendra Bahadur Shahi, Maoist Centre
- Karnali MPA 1(A): Durga Bahadur Rawat, Maoist Centre
- Karnali MPA 1(B): Hikmat Bahadur Bista, Congress

Kalikot 1 is the parliamentary constituency of Kalikot District in Nepal. This constituency came into existence on the Constituency Delimitation Commission report submitted on 31 August 2017.

== Incorporated areas ==
Kalikot 1 incorporates the entirety of Kalikot District.

== Assembly segments ==
It encompasses the following Karnali Provincial Assembly segment

- Kalikot 1(A)
- Kalikot 1(B)

== Members of Parliament ==
=== Parliament/Constituent Assembly ===
Election	Member	Party
1991	Tilak Prasad Neupane	Nepali Congress
1994	Yagya Raj Neupane	CPN (UML)
March 1998	Yagya Raj Neupane	CPN (Marxist–Leninist)
1999	Prem Bahadur Singh	CPN (UML)
2008	Khadga Bahadur Bishwakarma	CPN (Maoist)
January 2009	Khadga Bahadur Bishwakarma	UCPN (Maoist)
2013	Mahendra Bahadur Shahi	UCPN (Maoist)
May 2016	Mahendra Bahadur Shahi	CPN (Maoist Centre)
2017	Durga Bahadur Rawat	CPN (Maoist Centre)
May 2018	Durga Bahadur Rawat	Nepal Communist Party
March 2021	Durga Bahadur Rawat	CPN (Maoist Centre)
2022	Mahendra Bahadur Shahi	CPN (Maoist Centre)

=== Provincial Assembly ===
==== 1(A) ====
Election	Member	Party
2017	Kurma Raj Shahi	CPN (UML)
May 2018	Kurma Raj Shahi	Nepal Communist Party
March 2021	Kurma Raj Shahi	CPN (UML)
2022	Durga Bahadur Rawat	CPN (Maoist Centre)

==== 1(B) ====
Election	Member	Party
2017	Mahendra Bahadur Shahi	CPN (Maoist Centre)
May 2018	Mahendra Bahadur Shahi	Nepal Communist Party
March 2021	Mahendra Bahadur Shahi	CPN (Maoist Centre)
2022	Hikmat Bahadur Bista	Nepali Congress

== Election results ==
=== Election in the 2020s ===
==== 2022 general election ====
Candidate	Party	Votes	%
Mahendra Bahadur Shahi	CPN (Maoist Centre)	23,727	53.60
Shree Nagendra Shahi	CPN (UML)	16,718	37.77
Dhan Bahadur Budha	Rastriya Prajatantra Party	1,593	3.60
Khadga Raj Shahi	Nepal Workers Peasants Party	1,102	2.49
Others		1,126	2.54
Total		44,266	100.00
Majority		7,009	
CPN (Maoist Centre) hold			

==== 2022 provincial election ====
===== 1(A) =====
Candidate	Party	Votes	%
Durga Bahadur Rawat	CPN (Maoist Centre)	9,014	46.92
Kurmaraj Shahi	CPN (UML)	7,953	41.40
Rabindra Bahadur Shahi	Nepal Workers Peasants Party	1,172	6.10
Surya Bahadur Shahi	Rastriya Prajatantra Party	1,071	5.58
Others		0	0.00
Total		19,210	100.00
Majority		1,061	
CPN (Maoist Centre) gain			

===== 1(B) =====
Candidate	Party	Votes	%
Hikmat Bahadur Bista	Nepali Congress	13,783	54.38
Birendra Bahadur Bogati	CPN (UML)	5,838	23.04
Laxman Bahadur Bam	Independent	2,869	11.32
Bishwaraj Bam	CPN (Unified Socialist)	2,534	10.00
Others		320	1.26
Total		25,344	100.00
Majority		7,945	
Nepali Congress gain			

=== Election in the 2010s ===
==== 2017 general election ====
Candidate	Party	Votes	%
Durga Bahadur Rawat	CPN (Maoist Centre)	21,112	53.22
Bhupendra Jang Shahi	Nepali Congress	16,407	41.36
Others		2,151	5.42
Total		39,670	100.00
Valid votes		39,670	93.10
Invalid/blank votes		2,939	6.90
Total votes		42,609	100.00
Registered voters/turnout		64,961	65.59
Majority		4,705	
CPN (Maoist Centre) hold			
Source: Election Commission

==== 2017 provincial election ====
===== 1(A) =====
Candidate	Party	Votes	%
Kurma Raj Shahi	CPN (UML)	11,935	66.04
Tek Raj Shahi	Nepali Congress	4,489	24.84
Nawaraj Koirala	Nepal Workers Peasants Party	1,110	6.14
Others		538	2.98
Total		18,072	100.00
Valid votes		18,072	94.74
Invalid/blank votes		1,003	5.26
Total votes		19,075	100.00
Registered voters/turnout		27,469	69.44
Majority		7,446	
CPN (UML) gain			
Source: Election Commission

===== 1(B) =====
Candidate	Party	Votes	%
Mahendra Bahadur Shahi	CPN (Maoist Centre)	12,153	54.91
Kali Bahadur Sahakari	Nepali Congress	9,342	42.21
Others		639	2.89
Total		22,134	100.00
Valid votes		22,134	93.84
Invalid/blank votes		1,454	6.16
Total votes		23,588	100.00
Registered voters/turnout		37,492	62.91
Majority		2,811	
CPN (Maoist Centre) gain			
Source: Election Commission

==== 2013 Constituent Assembly election ====
Candidate	Party	Votes	%
Mahendra Bahadur Shahi	UCPN (Maoist)	12,088	30.50
Kurma Raj Shahi	CPN (UML)	11,224	28.32
Bhupendra Jang Shahi	Nepali Congress	8,797	22.19
Dhan Bahadur Budha	Rastriya Prajatantra Party	3,384	8.54
Navaraj Koirala	Nepal Workers Peasants Party	1,912	4.82
Others		2,234	5.64
Total		39,639	100.00
Valid votes		39,639	95.25
Invalid/blank votes		1,978	4.75
Total votes		41,617	100.00
Registered voters/turnout		53,534	77.74
Majority		3,291	
UCPN (Maoist) hold			
Source: Election Commission

=== Election in the 2000s ===
==== 2008 Constituent Assembly election ====
Candidate	Party	Votes	%
Khadga Bahadur Bishwakarma	CPN (Maoist)	27,629	50.95
Hikmat Bahadur Bista	Nepali Congress	11,241	20.73
Tula Raj Bista	CPN (UML)	9,238	17.04
Nanda Bahadur Shahi	Nepal Workers Peasants Party	2,394	4.41
Man Bahadur Bam	Rastriya Prajatantra Party	1,177	2.17
Deep Bahadur Shahi	Rastriya Janashakti Party	1,090	2.01
Others		1,459	2.69
Total		54,228	100.00
Valid votes		54,228	95.74
Invalid/blank votes		2,413	4.26
Total votes		56,641	100.00
Registered voters/turnout		80,252	70.58
Majority		16,388	
CPN (Maoist) gain			
Source: Election Commission

=== Election in the 1990s ===
==== 1999 general election ====
Candidate	Party	Votes	%
Prem Bahadur Singh	CPN (UML)	10,813	28.72
Netra Bahadur Shahi	Nepali Congress	9,394	24.95
Yagya Raj Neupane	CPN (Marxist–Leninist)	4,821	12.81
Satya Bahadur Shahi	Rastriya Prajatantra Party	4,576	12.15
Man Bahadur Bam	Independent	4,160	11.05
Nanda Bahadur Shahi	Nepal Workers Peasants Party	3,358	8.92
Jaya Krishna Sanjyal	Rastriya Janamorcha	526	1.40
Total		37,648	100.00
Valid votes		37,648	98.20
Invalid/blank votes		692	1.80
Total votes		38,340	100.00
Registered voters/turnout		67,498	56.80
Majority		1,419	
CPN (UML) gain			
Source: Election Commission

==== 1994 general election ====
Candidate	Party	Votes	%
Yagya Raj Neupane	CPN (UML)	6,591	51.89
Dharma Dutta Upadhyaya	Rastriya Prajatantra Party	6,112	48.11
Total		12,703	100.00
Majority		479	
CPN (UML) gain			
Source: Election Commission

==== 1991 general election ====
Candidate	Party	Votes	%
Tilak Prasad Neupane	Nepali Congress	7,717	51.44
-	Nepal Workers Peasants Party	7,286	48.56
Total		15,003	100.00
Majority		431	
Nepali Congress gain			

== See also ==
- List of parliamentary constituencies of Nepal
