= Ganesh Prasad Singh (Nepalese politician) =

Nepalese politician

Honourable Ganesh Prasad Singh
- गणेशप्रसाद सिंह

Province Assembly Member of Karnali Province
- Incumbent
- Assumed office 2017
- Preceded by: N/A
- Constituency: Jajarkot 1(A)

Personal details
- Party: CPN (Maoist Centre)
- Occupation: Politician

Ganesh Prasad Singh (Nepali: गणेशप्रसाद सिंह) is a Nepalese politician and Minister for Water Resources and Energy Development of Karnali Province. He is also a member of Provincial Assembly of Karnali Province belonging to the CPN (Maoist Centre). Singh, a resident of Nalgad, was elected via 2017 Nepalese provincial elections from Jajarkot 1(A).

== Electoral history ==
=== 2017 Nepalese provincial elections ===
Party	Candidate	Votes
CPN (Maoist Centre)	Ganesh Prasad Singh	16,911
Nepali Congress	Bed Raj Singh	12,878
Others		649
Result	Maoist Centre gain	
Source: Election Commission
