= Rajeev Bikram Shah =

Nepalese politician and social worker

- राजीव विक्रम शाह

Member of the Karnali Provincial Assembly
- Incumbent
- Assumed office 26 December 2022
- Preceded by: Karbir Shahi
- Constituency: Jajarkot 1 (A)

Member of Constituent Assembly / Legislature Parliament
- In office 21 January 2014 – 14 October 2017
- Preceded by: Bhakta Bahadur Shah
- Succeeded by: Constituency abolished
- Constituency: Jajarkot-2

Personal details
- Born: 8 April 1968 (age 57); Kathmandu
- Political party: Nepali Congress

Rajeev Bikram Shah (Nepali: राजीव विक्रम शाह) is a Nepalese politician. He was elected as a member of Constituent Assembly from second Constitutional Assembly election held on 19 November 2013 from Jajarkot Constituency No. 2. He is the president of Nepal Amateur Athletic Association. In the 2017 Nepalese legislative election he was candidate from Jajarkot constituency No. 1.

== See also ==
- List of Nepalese politicians
