= Bedraj Singh =

Nepalese politician

- बेदराज सिंह

Minister for Economic Affairs and Planning
- In office 20 April 2023 – 5 March 2024
- Governor: Tilak Pariyar
- Preceded by: Binod Kumar Shah
- Succeeded by: Mahendra K.C.

Member of Karnali Provincial Assembly
- Incumbent
- Assumed office 26 December 2022
- Preceded by: Ganesh Prasad Singh
- Constituency: Jajarkot 1(A)

Personal details
- Born: Jajarkot, Karnali, Nepal
- Party: Nepali Congress

Bedraj Singh (Nepali: बेदराज सिंह) is a Nepali politician belonging to Nepali Congress. Singh is the current provincial assembly member from Jajarkot 1(A). He is currently serving as the Minister for Economic Affairs and Planning of Karnali Province.

== Electoral history ==
=== 2022 Nepalese provincial elections ===
Candidate	Party	Votes	%
Bedraj Singh	Nepali Congress	18,543	53.11
Dambar Bahadur Singh	CPN (UML)	11,470	32.85
Kaman Bahadur Khadka	Independent	4,446	12.73
Others		457	1.31
Total		34,916	100.00
Majority		7,073	
Nepali Congress gain			
