= Durga Bahadur Rawat =

Nepali politician

- दुर्ग बहादुर रावत

Member of Parliament, Pratinidhi Sabha
- In office 4 March 2018 – 18 September 2022
- Preceded by: Mahendra Bahadur Shahi (as Member of the Constituent Assembly)
- Succeeded by: Mahendra Bahadur Shahi
- Constituency: Kalikot 1

Personal details
- Born: 11 January 1969 (age 57) Kalikot District
- Party: CPN (Maoist Centre)
- Other political affiliations: NMKP

Durga Bahadur Rawat is a Nepalese politician serving as a member of the Federal Parliament of Nepal elected from Kalikot-1, Province No. 6. He is a member of the Nepal Communist Party.
