= Govinda Prasad Kalauni =

Nepalese politician

Honourable Govinda Prasad Kalauni
- गोविन्दप्रसाद कलाैनी

Governor of Karnali Province
- In office 4 November 2019 – 9 November 2021
- President: Bidhya Devi Bhandari
- Chief Minister: Mahendra Bahadur Shahi; Jeevan Bahadur Shahi
- Preceded by: Durga Keshar Khanal
- Succeeded by: Tilak Pariyar

Personal details
- Born: 12 June 1955 (age 70) Baitadi District
- Citizenship: Nepali
- Education: Bachelor of Education (Science, Mathematics)
- Website: oph.karnali.gov.np/node/180

Govinda Prasad Kalauni (Nepali: गोविन्दप्रसाद कलाैनी) is the current Governor of Karnali Province. He was appointed governor, under Article 163 of the Constitution of Nepal, by President Bidya Devi Bhandari on the recommendation of the Council of Ministers of the Government of Nepal on 4 November 2019.

== Political background ==
Govinda Prasad Kalauni began his political career in 2035 BS as the member of ANNFSU. He was member of Nepal National Teachers Association since 2036 BS. From 2036 BS to 2047 BS, he was a member of Dadeldhura District of the Nepal National Teachers Association and was elected as a member of the Central Committee from the Fifth National Conference. From 2039 BS to 2041 BS, he served as Dadeldhura district chief of the Marxist Study Party (ML); and in 2040 BS, he received membership of CPN(ML). In 2047 BS, he received membership of CPN UML and served as the District Secretary of CPN UML Dadeldhura District Committee. In 2049 BS, he became Representative of the fifth National General Convention. In 2054 BS, he was Representative of the sixth National General Convention of the CPN UML. From the first National Representative Council meeting of the CPN UML held in 2068 BS, he was elected unopposed as a member of the party's first Central Election Commission and assumed the responsibility of the vice-chairman of the same commission. In 2076 BS, he was appointed Governor, as per the Article 163 of the Constitution of Nepal by the President Bidya Devi Bhandari on the recommendation of the Council of Ministers of the Government of Nepal.

== Parliamentary struggle ==
In 2048 BS, he became the candidate for Member of Parliament from Dadeldhura 1 (constituency) from CPN UML, but he lost the election. Again he became candidate for National Assembly Member from far Western Development Region in 2055 BS, but lost. In 2056 BS, he again was chosen candidate for the House of Representatives from Baitadi 2 (constituency), but he was defeated. He was candidate for Constituent Assembly from Kanchanpur 3 (constituency) but again defeated. In 2051 BS, he became the chairperson of the "Squatters' Problem Resolution Commission" Dadeldhura Baitadi.

== See also ==
- Karnali Province
- Governor (Nepal)
