= Naresh Bhandari =

Nepali politician

- नरेश भण्डारी

Parliament member
- Incumbent
- Assumed office 2008
- President: Bidya Devi Bhandari
- Prime Minister: Khadga Prasad Sharma Oli
- Vice President: nanda bahadur pun
- Constituency: Jumla-1

Minister of internal affairs and law
- President: Bidhya devi Bhandari
- Prime Minister: Khadga prasad oli
- Preceded by: Jeevan bahadur shahi
- Constituency: Jumla 1

Personal details
- Party: Communist Party of Nepal (Maoist)

Naresh Bhandari (Nepali: नरेश भण्डारी) is a Nepalese politician and former internal affairs and law minister of Karnali belonging to the Communist Party of Nepal (Maoist). In the 2008 Constituent Assembly election he was elected from the Jumla-1 constituency, winning 21127 votes.
