= Western Rukum 1 =

Parliamentary constituency in Nepal

- Parliamentary constituency for the House of Representatives
- Western Rukum 1 in Karnali Province

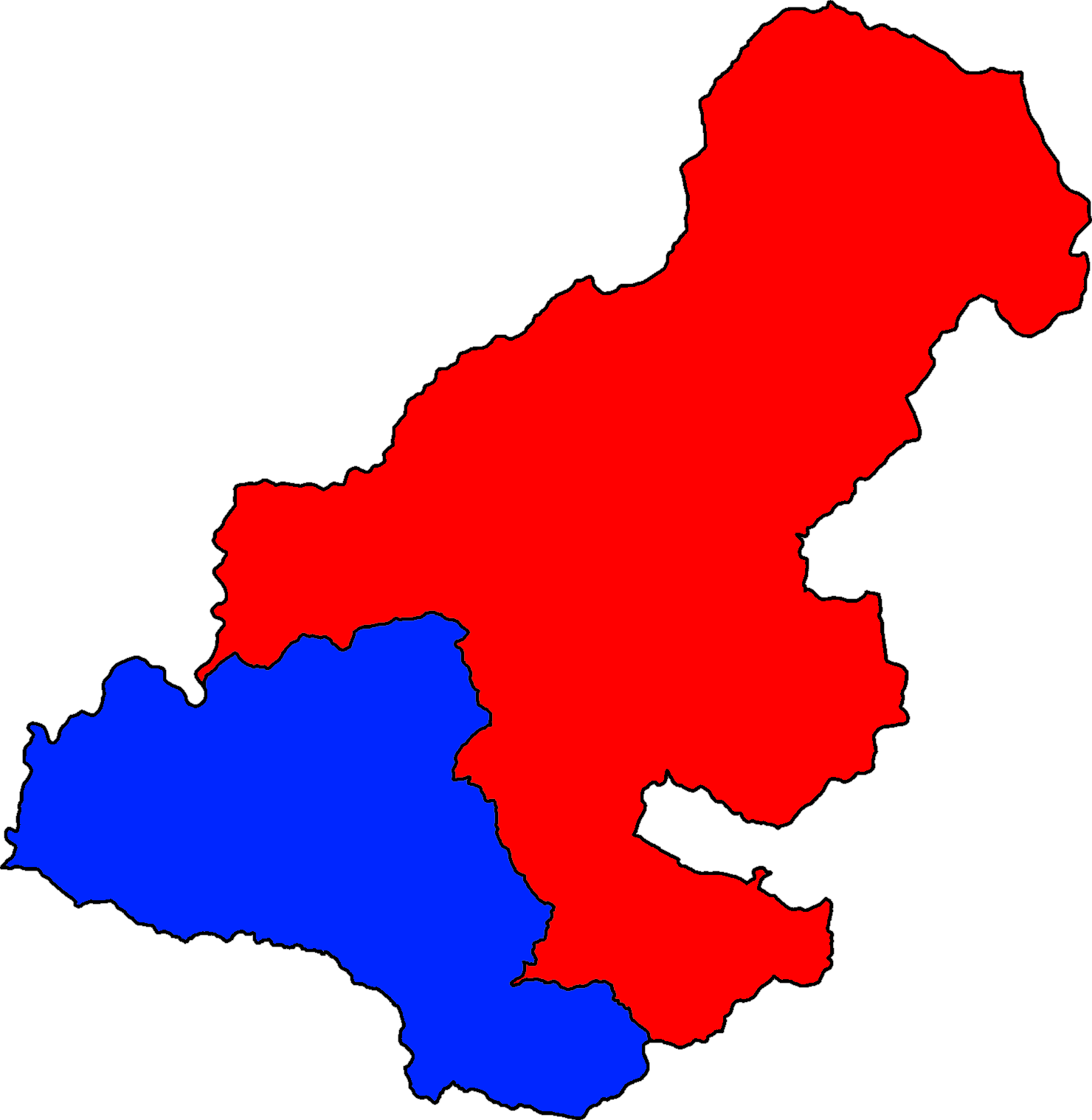
- Assembly segments Western Rukum 1(A) (red) and Western Rukum 1(B) (blue) within Western Rukum District
- Province: Karnali Province
- District: Western Rukum District
- Electorate: 84,032

Current constituency
- Created: 2017
- Number of members: 3
- Member of Parliament: Janardan Sharma, Maoist Centre
- Karnali MPA 1(A): Mahendra K.C., Maoist Centre
- Karnali MPA 1(B): Rajkumar Sharma, Maoist Centre

Western Rukum 1 is the parliamentary constituency of Western Rukum District in Nepal. This constituency came into existence on the Constituency Delimitation Commission (CDC) report submitted on 31 August 2017.

== Incorporated areas ==
Western Rukum 1 incorporates the entirety of Western Rukum District.

== Assembly segments ==
It encompasses the following Karnali Provincial Assembly segment

- Western Rukum 1(A)
- Western Rukum 1(B)

== Members of Parliament ==
=== Parliament/Constituent Assembly ===
Election	Member	Party
2017	Jarnardan Sharma	CPN (Maoist Centre)
May 2018	Jarnardan Sharma	Nepal Communist Party
March 2021	Jarnardan Sharma	CPN (Maoist Centre)

=== Provincial Assembly ===
==== 1(A) ====
Election	Member	Party
2017	Rato Kami	CPN (Maoist Centre)
May 2018	Rato Kami	Nepal Communist Party
March 2021	Rato Kami	CPN (Maoist Centre)
2022	Mahendra K.C.	CPN (Maoist Centre)

==== 1(B) ====
Election	Member	Party
2017	Gopal Sharma	CPN (Maoist Centre)
May 2018	Gopal Sharma	Nepal Communist Party
March 2021	Gopal Sharma	CPN (Maoist Centre)
2022	Rajkumar Sharma	CPN (Maoist Centre)

== Election results ==
=== Election in the 2020s ===
==== 2022 general election ====
Candidate	Party	Votes	%
Janardan Sharma	CPN (Maoist Centre)	39,549	69.03
Nandaram Devkota	CPN (UML)	12,961	22.62
Tara K.C.	Independent	3,567	6.23
Others		1,218	2.13
Total		57,295	100.00
Majority		26,588	
CPN (Maoist Centre) hold			

==== 2022 provincial election ====
===== 1(A) =====
Candidate	Party	Votes	%
Mahendra K.C.	CPN (Maoist Centre)	19,033	67.67
Narayan Kumar Shah	CPN (UML)	8,081	28.73
Binod Kumar Shah	Rastriya Prajatantra Party	1,011	3.59
Total		28,125	100.00
Majority		10,952	
CPN (Maoist Centre) hold			

===== 1(B) =====
Candidate	Party	Votes	%
Rajkumar Sharma	CPN (Maoist Centre)	20,160	68.70
Karna Bahadur Gharti Magar	CPN (UML)	8,078	27.53
Nirjal K.C.	Rastriya Prajatantra Party	1,107	3.77
Total		29,345	100.00
Majority		12,082	
CPN (Maoist Centre) hold			

=== Election in the 2010s ===
==== 2017 general election ====
Candidate	Party	Votes	%
Janardan Sharma	CPN (Maoist Centre)	34,402	66.27
Gopalji Jang Shah	Nepali Congress	15,659	30.16
Others		1,854	3.57
Total		51,915	100.00
Valid votes		51,915	93.57
Invalid/blank votes		3,570	6.43
Total votes		55,485	100.00
Registered voters/turnout		84,032	66.03
Majority		18,743	
CPN (Maoist Centre) gain			
Source: Election Commission

==== 2017 provincial election ====
===== 1(A) =====
Candidate	Party	Votes	%
Rato Kami	CPN (Maoist Centre)	16,810	65.01
Krishna Bahadur Rokaya	Nepali Congress	8,577	33.17
Dammar Bista	Naya Shakti Party	339	1.31
Tule Khatri	Rastriya Janamorcha	133	0.51
Total		25,859	100.00
Valid votes		25,859	95.16
Invalid/blank votes		1,315	4.84
Total votes		27,174	100.00
Registered voters/turnout		41,655	65.24
Majority		8,233	
CPN (Maoist Centre) gain			
Source: Election Commission

===== 1(B) =====
Candidate	Party	Votes	%
Gopal Sharma	CPN (Maoist Centre)	18,587	68.28
Khadak Bahadur Dangi	Nepali Congress	8,127	29.85
Prem Kumar Acharya	Naya Shakti Party	509	1.87
Total		27,223	100.00
Valid votes		27,223	96.28
Invalid/blank votes		1,051	3.72
Total votes		28,274	100.00
Registered voters/turnout		42,377	66.72
Majority		10,460	
CPN (Maoist Centre) gain			
Source: Election Commission

== See also ==
- List of parliamentary constituencies of Nepal
