= Mahendra Bahadur Shahi =

Nepalese politician (born 1977)

- महेन्द्र बहादुर शाही
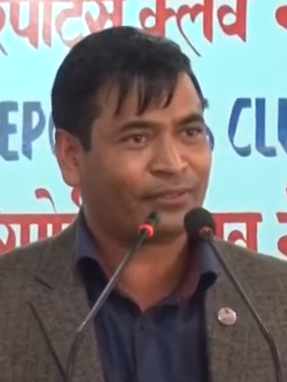

1st Chief Minister of Karnali Province
- In office 17 February 2018 – 1 November 2021
- Governor: Durga Keshar Khanal; Govinda Prasad Kalauni
- Succeeded by: Jeevan Bahadur Shahi

Minister of Energy
- In office 26 July 2017 – 17 October 2017
- President: Bidya Devi Bhandari
- Prime Minister: Sher Bahadur Deuba
- Preceded by: Janardhan Sharma
- Succeeded by: Barsaman Pun

Member of Parliament, Pratinidhi Sabha
- Incumbent
- Assumed office 22 December 2022
- Preceded by: Durga Bahadur Rawat
- Constituency: Kalikot 1

Member of the Constituent Assembly
- In office 21 January 2014 – 14 October 2017
- Preceded by: Khadga Bahadur Bishwakarma
- Succeeded by: Durga Bahadur Rawat (as Member of Parliament)
- Constituency: Kalikot 1

Member of Karnali Provincial Assembly
- Incumbent
- Assumed office 4 February 2018
- Constituency: Kalikot 1(B)

Personal details
- Born: 28 January 1977 (age 49) Nanikot (now Pachaljharana), Kalikot District, Nepal
- Party: NCP
- Other political affiliations: CPN (Maoist Centre)

Mahendra Bahadur Shahi (Nepali: महेन्द्र बहादुर शाही) is a Nepalese politician and former Chief Minister of Karnali, a province in western Nepal. He was a member of 1st Nepalese Constituent Assembly and was Minister of Energy, Nepal. He was unanimously selected as the Parliamentary Party leader of the CPN (MC) for Karnali on 14 February 2018.

He was appointed as the chief minister, according to Article 168 (1) of the Constitution of Nepal and took the oath of his office and secrecy as a chief minister on 17 February 2018.

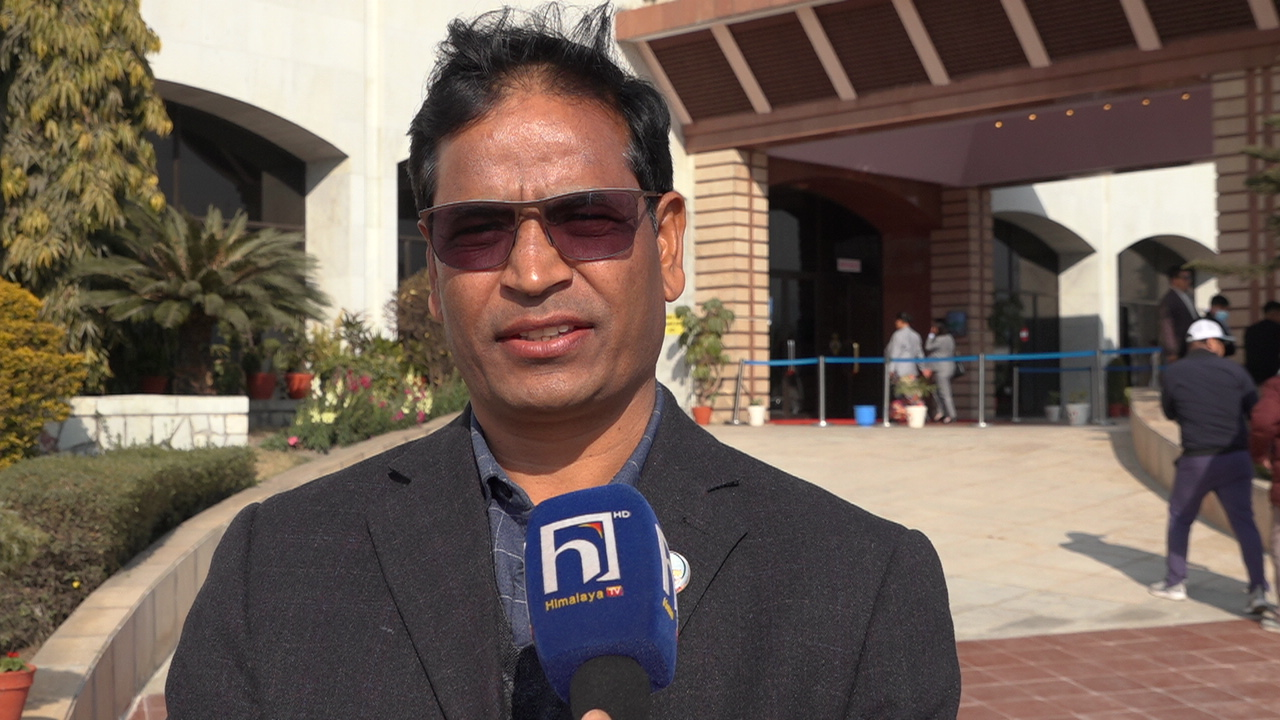
Mahendra Bahadur Shahi महेन्द्रबहादुर शाही

== Early life ==
Mahendra Bahadur Shahi was born in Nanikot (now Pachaljharana), Kalikot, Nepal to Laal Bahadur Shahi and Rankauda Shahi.
