= Jeevan Bahadur Shahi =

Nepalese politician

- जीवनबहादुर शाही
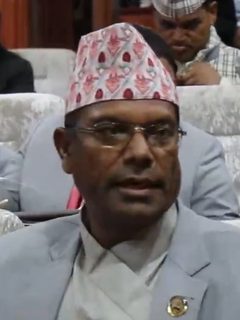

2nd Chief Minister of Karnali Province
- In office 3 November 2021 – 12 January 2023
- President: Bidya Devi Bhandari
- Governor: Govinda Prasad Kalauni; Tilak Pariyar
- Preceded by: Mahendra Bahadur Shahi
- Succeeded by: Raj Kumar Sharma

Joint General Secretary of Nepali Congress
- Incumbent
- Assumed office 29 October 2026
- President: Gagan Thapa

Personal details
- Born: 3 March 1965 (age 61) Humla District, Karnali Province, Nepal
- Party: Nepali Congress
- Cabinet: Jeevan Bahadur Shahi cabinet

Jeevan Bahadur Shahi (Nepali: जीवनबहादुर शाही) is a Nepalese politician who served as the Chief Minister of Karnali Province. He is also a member of Provincial Assembly of Karnali Province.

== Political career ==
He is a member of the Nepali Congress party. Shahi has previously served as Minister for Culture, Tourism and Civil Aviation from 2016 to 2017. In 15th general convention of the Nepali Congress he was elected as the Joint General Secretary of the party.

== Personal life ==
Shahi was born on 3 March 1965 in Humla District, Karnali Province, Nepal.

Political offices
Preceded by Mahendra Bahadur Shahi	Chief Minister of Karnali Province; 2021-2023	Succeeded by Raj Kumar Sharma
