= Yam Lal Kandel =

Nepali politician

- यामलाल कँडेल
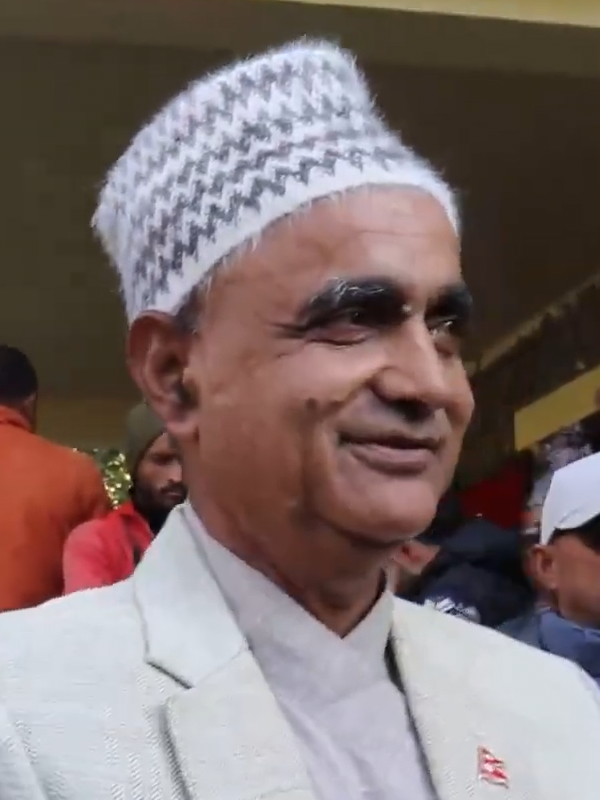
- Kandel in 2022

4th Chief Minister of Karnali Province
- In office 10 April 2024 – 28 July 2026
- President: Ram Chandra Poudel
- Governor: Tilak Pariyar; Yagya Raj Joshi
- Preceded by: Raj Kumar Sharma
- Succeeded by: Mangal Bahadur Shahi

Minister for Internal Affairs and Law of Karnali Province
- Incumbent
- Assumed office 10 April 2024
- Governor: Tilak Pariyar
- Chief Minister: himself
- Preceded by: Krishna Bahadur G.C.

Leader of the Opposition in the Karnali Provincial Assembly
- In office 9 April 2023 – 10 April 2024
- Chief Minister: Raj Kumar Sharma
- Preceded by: Jeevan Bahadur Shahi
- Succeeded by: Jeevan Bahadur Shahi
- In office 5 April 2021 – 18 September 2022
- Chief Minister: Mahendra Bahadur Shahi; Jeevan Bahadur Shahi
- Preceded by: Jeevan Bahadur Shahi
- Succeeded by: Jeevan Bahadur Shahi
Parliamentary offices
Member of the Constituent Assembly / Legislature Parliament
In office 2008–2013
Preceded by	Hridaya Ram Thani
Succeeded by	Hridaya Ram Thani
Constituency	Surkhet 2
Member of the Parliament, Pratinidhi Sabha
In office 1994–1998
Preceded by	Shiv Raj Joshi
Succeeded by	Hridaya Ram Thani
Constituency	Surkhet 2
Member of the Karnali Provincial Assembly
Incumbent
Assumed office 2018
Preceded by	Constitution created
Constituency	Surkhet 2 (A)

Personal details
- Born: 10 November 1961 (age 65) Gaibanna, Dailekh, Kingdom of Nepal (present day Gurans Rural Municipality, Dailekh, Karnali Province, Nepal)
- Party: Communist Party of Nepal (Unified Marxist-Leninist)
- Other political affiliations: Nepal Communist Party
- Spouse: Gita Adhikari
- Children: 3 daughters
- Parents: Maniram Kandel (father); Bhagirathi Kandel (mother)
- Education: Master's degree in Commerce; Bachelor's degree in Commerce
- Alma mater: Tribhuvan University

Yam Lal Kandel (Nepali: यामलाल कँडेल) is a Nepalese politician, belonging to the Communist Party of Nepal (Unified Marxist-Leninist). He is currently serving as the 4th chief minister of Karnali Province since 10 April 2024. Kandel is the Parliamentary Party leader of the CPN (UML) in the province and is also member of Karnali Provincial Assembly from Surkhet 2(A) constituency since 2017. He is the standing committee member of CPN-UML.

In the 2008 Constituent Assembly election he was elected from the Surkhet-2 constituency, winning 16297 votes. He completed his Master's degree in Commerce and Bachelor's degree in Commerce from Tribhuvan University in 1990 and has been engaged in full-time politics since 1979. He also served as a cabinet minister and was appointed Minister of Tourism and Civil Aviation of Nepal in 26 August 1998, parliamentarian in 1994 and mayor in 1992.

During the 2025 Nepalese Gen Z protests his private residence in Bhairavasthan, Birendranagar was torched by protesters.
