= Karnali Provincial Assembly =

Unicameral legislature of Karnali Province, Nepal

Karnali Provincial Assembly कर्णाली प्रदेश सभा
- 2nd Karnali Provincial Assembly

Type
- Type: Unicameral legislature of Karnali Province

History
- Founded: 2018

Leadership
- Speaker: Nanda Gurung, CPN (UML)
- Deputy Speaker: Yashoda Neupane, CPN (MC)
- Leader of the House: Mangal Bahadur Shahi, NCP since 29 July 2026
- Leader of the Opposition: Jeevan Bahadur Shahi, NC since 29 July 2026

Structure
- Political groups: Government (24): NCP: 14; CPN (UML): 10; Opposition (15): NC: 14; RPP: 1; Vacate (1): Vacate: 1
- Length of term: 5 years

Elections
- Voting system: Parallel voting: 24 seats – FPtP; 16 seats – PR
- First election: 2017
- Last election: 20 November 2022
- Next election: 2027

Meeting place
- Irrigation Division Office, Birendranagar, Surkhet District

Website
- pga.karnali.gov.np

Constitution
- Constitution of Nepal

The Provincial Assembly of Karnali Province also known as the Karnali Pradesh Sabha, (Nepali: कर्णाली प्रदेश सभा) is a unicameral governing and law making body of Karnali Province, one of the seven provinces in Nepal. The assembly is seated in the provincial capital at Birendranagar in Surkhet District at the Irrigation Division Office. The assembly has 40 members of whom 24 are elected through first-past-the-post voting and 16 are elected through proportional representation. The term of the assembly is 5 years unless dissolved earlier.

The First Provincial Assembly was constituted in 2017, after the 2017 provincial elections. The current assembly was elected in November 2022.

== History ==
The Provincial Assembly of Karnali Province is formed under Article 175 of the Constitution of Nepal 2015 which guarantees a provincial legislative assembly for each province in the country. The first provincial elections were conducted for all seven provinces in Nepal and the elections in Karnali Province were conducted for 40 seats to the assembly. The election resulted in a victory for the CPN (Unified Marxist–Leninist) and CPN (Maoist Centre) alliance which later went on to form a coalition government under Mahendra Bahadur Shahi from Maoist Centre. The first meeting of the provincial assembly was held on 4 February 2018. Raj Bahadur Shahi from CPN (UML) was elected as the first speaker of the provincial assembly, and Pushpa Ghari Bista from Maoist Centre as the first deputy speaker of the provincial assembly.

== List of assemblies ==
Election Year	Assembly	Start of term	End of term	Speaker	Chief Minister	Party
2017	1st Assembly	4 February 2018	September 2022	Raj Bahadur Shahi	Mahendra Bahadur Shahi (Cabinet)	CPN (Maoist Centre)
2017	1st Assembly	4 February 2018	September 2022	Raj Bahadur Shahi	Jeevan Bahadur Shahi (Cabinet)	Nepali Congress
2022	2nd Assembly	2 January 2023	Incumbent	Nanda Gurung	Raj Kumar Sharma (Cabinet)	CPN (Maoist Centre)
2022	2nd Assembly	2 January 2023	Incumbent	Nanda Gurung	Yam Lal Kandel (Cabinet)	CPN (Unified Marxist-Leninist)

== Committees ==
Article 195 of the Constitution of Nepal provides provincial assemblies the power to form special committees in order to manage working procedures.

S.No.	Committee	Members
1	Finance and National Resources	8
2	Legislative and Parliamentary Affairs	7
3	Social Development	8
4	Public Accounts	9

== Current composition ==
Party	Parliamentary party leader	Seats
Nepali Congress	Jeevan Bahadur Shahi	14
Nepali Communist Party	Mangal Bahadur Shahi	14
CPN (UML)	Yam Lal Kandel	10
Rastriya Prajatantra Party	Santoshi Shahi	1
Total		40

== See also ==
- Karnali Province
- Provincial assemblies of Nepal
