= First Deuba cabinet =

Government of Nepal from 1995 to 1997

- Cabinet of Nepal
- September 1995–March 1997
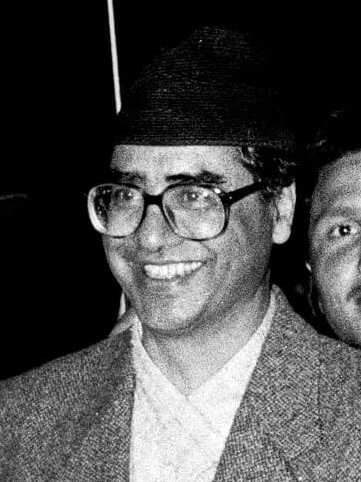
- Sher Bahadur Deuba
- Date formed: 12 September 1995
- Date dissolved: 10 March 1997

People and organisations
- Monarch: King Birendra
- Prime Minister: Sher Bahadur Deuba
- Total no. of members: 51 appointments
- Member parties: Nepali Congress Rastriya Prajatantra Party Nepal Sadbhawana Party Independent
- Status in legislature: Majority (coalition)
- Opposition party: CPN (UML)
- Opposition leaders: Man Mohan Adhikari

History
- Election: 1994
- Legislature terms: 1994–1999
- Predecessor: Adhikari cabinet
- Successor: Third Chand cabinet

The first Sher Bahadur Deuba cabinet was formed on 12 September 1995. After Man Mohan Adhikari lost support in the House of Representatives, he recommended to dissolve the lower house. However, the Supreme Court restored the lower house and King Birendra appointed Nepali Congress parliamentary party leader Sher Bahadur Deuba as prime minister on 11 September 1995. He was supported by the Rastriya Prajatantra Party and Nepal Sadbhawana Party.

The cabinet was expanded on 22 September 1995 and again on 13 December 1995. The cabinet was reshuffled on 10 June 1996 and on 8 January 1997. After losing a no-confidence motion, he resigned as prime minister on 7 March 1997 and the cabinet was dissolved on 10 March 1997 after the appointment of Lokendra Bahadur Chand.

== Cabinet ==
=== September 1995–June 1996 ===
Portfolio	Minister	Party	Took office	Left office
Prime Minister of Nepal Minister for Palace Affairs Minister for Defence	Sher Bahadur Deuba	Nepali Congress	12 September 1995	10 March 1997
Minister for Labour	Bal Bahadur Rai	Nepali Congress	22 September 1995	10 March 1997
Minister for Forests and Soil Conservation	Sheikh Idrish	Nepali Congress	22 September 1995	26 November 1996
Minister for Agriculture	Padma Sundar Lawati	Rastriya Prajatantra Party	22 September 1995	27 November 1996
Minister for Industry	Dundiraj Shastri	Nepali Congress	12 September 1995	10 March 1997
Minister for Information and Communications	Chiranjibi Wagle	Nepali Congress	22 September 1995	10 March 1997
Minister for Housing and Physical Planning	Balaram Gharti Magar	Rastriya Prajatantra Party	22 September 1995	10 March 1997
Minister for Local Development	Khum Bahadur Khadka	Nepali Congress	12 September 1995	22 September 1995
Minister for Home Affairs	Khum Bahadur Khadka	Nepali Congress	22 September 1995	10 March 1997
Minister for Education	Govinda Raj Joshi	Nepali Congress	22 September 1995	10 March 1997
Minister for Water Supply	Pashupati SJB Rana	Rastriya Prajatantra Party	22 September 1995	10 March 1997
Minister for Tourism and Civil Aviation	Chakra Prasad Bastola	Nepali Congress	22 September 1995	10 March 1997
Minister for Finance	Ram Sharan Mahat	Nepali Congress	22 September 1995	31 July 1996
Minister for Foreign Affairs	Prakash Chandra Lohani	Rastriya Prajatantra Party	22 September 1995	10 March 1997
Minister for Construction and Transportation	Bijay Kumar Gachhadar	Nepali Congress	22 September 1995	10 March 1997
Minister for Health	Arjun Narasingha K.C.	Nepali Congress	22 September 1995	10 March 1997
Minister for Commerce	Fateh Singh Tharu	Rastriya Prajatantra Party	12 September 1995	8 January 1997
Minister for Law and Justice	Bhim Bahadur Tamang	Nepali Congress	22 September 1995	10 March 1997
Minister for Law, Justice and Parliamentary Affairs	Kamal Thapa	Rastriya Prajatantra Party	12 September 1995	22 September 1995
Minister for Local Development	Kamal Thapa	Rastriya Prajatantra Party	22 September 1995	11 December 1996
Minister for Supplies	Gajendra Narayan Singh	Nepal Sadbhawana Party	12 September 1995	10 March 1997
Minister for Land Reform and Management	Budhhiman Tamang	Rastriya Prajatantra Party	22 September 1995	10 March 1997
Minister for Women and Social Welfare	Lila Koirala	Nepali Congress	13 December 1995	10 March 1997
Minister for Youth, Sports and Culture	Bal Bahadur K.C.	Nepali Congress	13 December 1995	10 March 1997
Minister for General Administration	Bimalendra Nidhi	Nepali Congress	13 December 1995	10 March 1997
Minister for Population and Environment	Prakash Man Singh	Nepali Congress	13 December 1995	10 March 1997
Minister for Parliamentary Affairs	Narahari Acharya	Nepali Congress	13 December 1995	10 March 1997
Ministers of State
Minister of State for Local Development	Ram Krishna Acharya	Rastriya Prajatantra Party	22 September 1995	10 June 1996
Minister of State without portfolio	Sharat Singh Bhandari	Nepali Congress	13 December 1995	10 June 1996
Assistant Ministers
Assistant Minister for Housing and Physical Planning	Shanti Shamsher Rana	Rastriya Prajatantra Party	22 September 1995	10 June 1996
Assistant Minister for Land Reform and Management	Prem Bahadur Bhandari	Rastriya Prajatantra Party	22 September 1995	10 June 1996
Assistant Minister for Agriculture	Mahendra Raya	Rastriya Prajatantra Party	22 September 1995	10 June 1996
Assistant Minister for Water Supply	Sarbendra Nath Shukla	Rastriya Prajatantra Party	22 September 1995	10 June 1996
Assistant Minister for Commerce	Rajiv Parajuli	Rastriya Prajatantra Party	22 September 1995	10 June 1996
Assistant Minister for Finance	Chin Kaji Shrestha	Nepali Congress	13 December 1995	10 March 1997
Assistant Minister for Industry	Gopalji Jung Shahi	Nepali Congress	13 December 1995	10 March 1997
Assistant Minister for Education	Hasta Bahadur Malla	Nepali Congress	13 December 1995	10 March 1997
Assistant Minister for Home Affairs	Dipak Prakash Baskota	Nepali Congress	13 December 1995	10 March 1997
Assistant Minister for Construction and Transportation	Ganesh Bahadur Khadka	Nepali Congress	13 December 1995	10 March 1997
Assistant Minister for Population and Environment	Chhabi Prasad Devkota	Nepali Congress	13 December 1995	10 March 1997
Assistant Minister for Women and Social Welfare	Duryodhan Chaudhary	Nepali Congress	13 December 1995	10 March 1997
Assistant Minister for Information and Communications	Ram Chandra Prasad Kuswaha	Nepali Congress	13 December 1995	10 March 1997
Assistant Minister for Health	Suresh Chandra Das	Nepali Congress	13 December 1995	10 March 1997
Assistant Minister for Forests and Soil Conservation	Min Bahadur Khatri	Nepali Congress	13 December 1995	10 March 1997
Assistant Minister for Youth, Sports and Culture	Palten Gurung	Nepali Congress	13 December 1995	10 March 1997
Assistant Minister for Labour	Jyotendra Mohan Chaudhary	Independent	22 September 1995	10 March 1997

=== June 1996–January 1997 ===
Portfolio	Minister	Party	Took office	Left office
Prime Minister of Nepal Minister for Palace Affairs Minister for Defence	Sher Bahadur Deuba	Nepali Congress	12 September 1995	10 March 1997
Minister for Labour	Bal Bahadur Rai	Nepali Congress	22 September 1995	10 March 1997
Minister for Youth, Sports and Culture	Sheikh Idrish	Nepali Congress	22 September 1995	26 November 1996
Minister for Agriculture	Padma Sundar Lawati	Rastriya Prajatantra Party	22 September 1995	27 November 1996
Minister for Industry	Dundiraj Shastri	Nepali Congress	12 September 1995	10 March 1997
Minister for Information and Communications	Chiranjibi Wagle	Nepali Congress	22 September 1995	10 March 1997
Minister for Housing and Physical Planning	Balaram Gharti Magar	Rastriya Prajatantra Party	22 September 1995	10 March 1997
Minister for Home Affairs	Khum Bahadur Khadka	Nepali Congress	22 September 1995	10 March 1997
Minister for Education	Govinda Raj Joshi	Nepali Congress	22 September 1995	10 March 1997
Minister for Water Supply	Pashupati SJB Rana	Rastriya Prajatantra Party	22 September 1995	10 March 1997
Minister for Tourism and Civil Aviation	Chakra Prasad Bastola	Nepali Congress	22 September 1995	10 March 1997
Minister for Finance	Ram Sharan Mahat	Nepali Congress	22 September 1995	31 July 1996
Minister for Finance	Ram Sharan Mahat	Nepali Congress	17 October 1996	10 March 1997
Minister for Foreign Affairs	Prakash Chandra Lohani	Rastriya Prajatantra Party	22 September 1995	10 March 1997
Minister for Construction and Transportation	Bijay Kumar Gachhadar	Nepali Congress	22 September 1995	10 March 1997
Minister for Health	Arjun Narasingha K.C.	Nepali Congress	22 September 1995	10 March 1997
Minister for Commerce	Fateh Singh Tharu	Rastriya Prajatantra Party	12 September 1995	8 January 1997
Minister for Law and Justice	Bhim Bahadur Tamang	Nepali Congress	22 September 1995	10 March 1997
Minister for Local Development	Kamal Thapa	Rastriya Prajatantra Party	22 September 1995	11 December 1996
Minister for Supplies	Gajendra Narayan Singh	Nepal Sadbhawana Party	12 September 1995	10 March 1997
Minister for Land Reform and Management	Budhhiman Tamang	Rastriya Prajatantra Party	22 September 1995	10 March 1997
Minister for Women and Social Welfare	Lila Koirala	Nepali Congress	13 December 1995	10 March 1997
Minister for Youth, Sports and Culture	Bal Bahadur K.C.	Nepali Congress	13 December 1995	10 March 1997
Minister for General Administration	Bimalendra Nidhi	Nepali Congress	13 December 1995	10 March 1997
Minister for Population and Environment	Prakash Man Singh	Nepali Congress	13 December 1995	10 March 1997
Minister for Parliamentary Affairs	Narahari Acharya	Nepali Congress	13 December 1995	10 March 1997
Minister for Science and Technology	Ram Krishna Acharya	Rastriya Prajatantra Party	10 June 1996	23 December 1996
Minister without portfolio	Sharat Singh Bhandari	Nepali Congress	10 June 1996	10 March 1997
Ministers of State
Minister of State for Agriculture	Prem Bahadur Bhandari	Rastriya Prajatantra Party	10 June 1996	23 December 1996
Minister of State for Housing and Physical Planning	Shanti Shamsher Rana	Rastriya Prajatantra Party	10 June 1996	8 January 1997
Minister of State for Land Reform and Management	Mahendra Raya	Rastriya Prajatantra Party	10 June 1996	8 January 1997
Minister of State for Water Supply	Sarbendra Nath Shukla	Rastriya Prajatantra Party	10 June 1996	17 December 1996
Minister of State for Local Development	Rajiv Parajuli	Rastriya Prajatantra Party	10 June 1996	23 December 1996
Assistant Ministers
Assistant Minister for Housing and Physical Planning	Bishnu Bikram Thapa	Rastriya Prajatantra Party	10 June 1996	23 December 1996
Assistant Minister for Commerce	Khobhari Raya	Rastriya Prajatantra Party	10 June 1996	8 January 1997
Assistant Minister for Finance	Chin Kaji Shrestha	Nepali Congress	13 December 1995	8 January 1997
Assistant Minister for Industry	Gopalji Jung Shahi	Nepali Congress	13 December 1995	8 January 1997
Assistant Minister for Education	Hasta Bahadur Malla	Nepali Congress	13 December 1995	8 January 1997
Assistant Minister for Home Affairs	Dipak Prakash Baskota	Nepali Congress	13 December 1995	8 January 1997
Assistant Minister for Construction and Transportation	Ganesh Bahadur Khadka	Nepali Congress	13 December 1995	8 January 1997
Assistant Minister for Population and Environment	Chhabi Prasad Devkota	Nepali Congress	13 December 1995	8 January 1997
Assistant Minister for Women and Social Welfare	Duryodhan Chaudhary	Nepali Congress	13 December 1995	8 January 1997
Assistant Minister for Information and Communications	Ram Chandra Prasad Kuswaha	Nepali Congress	13 December 1995	10 March 1997
Assistant Minister for Health	Suresh Chandra Das	Nepali Congress	13 December 1995	10 March 1997
Assistant Minister for Forests and Soil Conservation	Min Bahadur Khatri	Nepali Congress	13 December 1995	8 January 1997
Assistant Minister for Youth, Sports and Culture	Palten Gurung	Nepali Congress	13 December 1995	8 January 1997
Assistant Minister for Labour	Jyotendra Mohan Chaudhary	Independent	22 September 1995	8 January 1997
Assistant Minister for Supplies	Anish Ansari	Nepal Sadbhawana Party	1995	17 December 1996

=== January 1997–March 1997 ===
Portfolio	Minister	Party	Took office	Left office
Prime Minister of Nepal Minister for Palace Affairs Minister for Defence	Sher Bahadur Deuba	Nepali Congress	12 September 1995	10 March 1997
Minister for Labour	Bal Bahadur Rai	Nepali Congress	22 September 1995	10 March 1997
Minister for Industry	Dundiraj Shastri	Nepali Congress	12 September 1995	10 March 1997
Minister for Information and Communications	Chiranjibi Wagle	Nepali Congress	22 September 1995	10 March 1997
Minister for Settlement and Physical Planning	Balaram Gharti Magar	Rastriya Prajatantra Party	22 September 1995	10 March 1997
Minister for Home Affairs	Khum Bahadur Khadka	Nepali Congress	22 September 1995	10 March 1997
Minister for Education	Govinda Raj Joshi	Nepali Congress	22 September 1995	10 March 1997
Minister for Water Supply	Pashupati SJB Rana	Rastriya Prajatantra Party	22 September 1995	10 March 1997
Minister for Tourism and Civil Aviation	Chakra Prasad Bastola	Nepali Congress	22 September 1995	10 March 1997
Minister for Finance	Ram Sharan Mahat	Nepali Congress	17 October 1996	10 March 1997
Minister for Foreign Affairs	Prakash Chandra Lohani	Rastriya Prajatantra Party	22 September 1995	10 March 1997
Minister for Construction and Transportation	Bijay Kumar Gachhadar	Nepali Congress	22 September 1995	10 March 1997
Minister for Health	Arjun Narasingha K.C.	Nepali Congress	22 September 1995	10 March 1997
Minister for Agriculture	Fateh Singh Tharu	Rastriya Prajatantra Party	8 January 1997	10 March 1997
Minister for Law and Justice	Bhim Bahadur Tamang	Nepali Congress	22 September 1995	10 March 1997
Minister for Local Development	Kamal Thapa	Rastriya Prajatantra Party	8 January 1997	10 March 1997
Minister for Supplies	Gajendra Narayan Singh	Nepal Sadbhawana Party	12 September 1995	10 March 1997
Minister for Land Reform and Management	Budhhiman Tamang	Rastriya Prajatantra Party	22 September 1995	10 March 1997
Minister for Science and Technology	Budhhiman Tamang	Rastriya Prajatantra Party	8 January 1997	10 March 1997
Minister for Women and Social Welfare	Lila Koirala	Nepali Congress	13 December 1995	10 March 1997
Minister for Youth, Sports and Culture	Bal Bahadur K.C.	Nepali Congress	13 December 1995	10 March 1997
Minister for General Administration	Bimalendra Nidhi	Nepali Congress	13 December 1995	10 March 1997
Minister for Population and Environment	Prakash Man Singh	Nepali Congress	13 December 1995	10 March 1997
Minister for Parliamentary Affairs	Narahari Acharya	Nepali Congress	13 December 1995	10 March 1997
Minister for Commerce	Ram Krishna Acharya	Rastriya Prajatantra Party	8 January 1997	10 March 1997
Minister without portfolio	Sharat Singh Bhandari	Nepali Congress	10 June 1996	10 March 1997
Minister for Forests and Soil Conservation	Moti Prasad Pahadi	Nepali Congress	8 January 1997	10 March 1997
Ministers of State
Minister of State for Water Supply	Shanti Shamsher Rana	Rastriya Prajatantra Party	8 January 1997	10 March 1997
Minister of State for Agriculture	Prem Bahadur Bhandari	Rastriya Prajatantra Party	8 January 1997	10 March 1997
Minister of State for Land Reform and Management	Mahendra Raya	Rastriya Prajatantra Party	10 June 1996	10 March 1997
Minister of State for Local Development	Rajiv Parajuli	Rastriya Prajatantra Party	8 January 1997	10 March 1997
Minister of State Finance	Chin Kaji Shrestha	Nepali Congress	8 January 1997	10 March 1997
Minister of State Industry	Gopalji Jung Shahi	Nepali Congress	8 January 1997	10 March 1997
Minister of State Education	Hasta Bahadur Malla	Nepali Congress	8 January 1997	10 March 1997
Minister of State Home Affairs	Dipak Prakash Baskota	Nepali Congress	8 January 1997	10 March 1997
Minister of State Population and Environment	Chhabi Prasad Devkota	Nepali Congress	8 January 1997	10 March 1997
Minister of State Tourism and Civil Aviation	Palten Gurung	Nepali Congress	8 January 1997	10 March 1997
Minister of State Labour	Anish Ansari	Nepal Sadbhawana Party	8 January 1997	10 March 1997
Minister of State Commerce	Bishnu Bikram Thapa	Rastriya Prajatantra Party	8 January 1997	10 March 1997
Minister of State for Forests and Soil Conservation	Bhakta Bahadur Rokaya	Nepali Congress	8 January 1997	10 March 1997
Assistant Ministers
Assistant Minister for Construction and Transportation	Ganesh Bahadur Khadka	Nepali Congress	13 December 1995	10 March 1997
Assistant Minister for Supplies	Duryodhan Chaudhary	Nepali Congress	8 January 1997	10 March 1997
Assistant Minister for Information and Communications	Ram Chandra Prasad Kuswaha	Nepali Congress	13 December 1995	10 March 1997
Assistant Minister for Health	Suresh Chandra Das	Nepali Congress	13 December 1995	10 March 1997
Assistant Minister for General Administration	Min Bahadur Khatri	Nepali Congress	8 January 1997	10 March 1997
Assistant Minister for Youth, Sports and Culture	Jyotendra Mohan Chaudhary	Independent	8 January 1997	10 March 1997
Assistant Minister for Science and Technology	Mirza Dilshad Beg	Rastriya Prajatantra Party	8 January 1997	29 June 1998
Assistant Minister for Women and Social Welfare	Naresh Bahadur Singh	Nepali Congress	8 January 1997	10 March 1997
