= Third Chand cabinet =

Government of Nepal in 1997

- Cabinet of Nepal
- March 1997–October 1997
- Date formed: 12 March 1997
- Date dissolved: 6 October 1997

People and organisations
- Monarch: King Birendra
- Prime Minister: Lokendra Bahadur Chand
- Deputy Prime Minister: Bam Dev Gautam
- Total no. of members: 43 appointments
- Member parties: CPN (UML) Rastriya Prajatantra Party Nepal Sadbhawana Party Independent
- Status in legislature: Majority (coalition)
- Opposition party: Nepali Congress
- Opposition leaders: Girija Prasad Koirala

History
- Election: 1994
- Legislature terms: 1994–1999
- Predecessor: First Deuba cabinet
- Successor: Fourth Thapa cabinet

The third Chanda cabinet was formed on 12 March 1997, after the biggest party in the House of Representatives, CPN (UML) supported Rastriya Prajatantra Party leader Lokendra Bahadur Chand as the prime minister. The cabinet was expanded on 25 March 1997, 30 June 1997 and 29 August 1997.

After losing a no-confidence motion on 4 October 1997, the cabinet was dissolved two days later when Surya Bahadur Thapa was appointed prime minister.

== Cabinet ==
=== March–June 1997 ===
Portfolio	Minister	Party	Took office	Left office
Prime Minister of Nepal; Minister for Palace Affairs; Minister for Defence	Lokendra Bahadur Chand	Rastriya Prajatantra Party	12 March 1997	6 October 1997
Deputy Prime Minister; Minister for Home Affairs	Bam Dev Gautam	CPN (UML)	12 March 1997	6 October 1997
Minister for Finance	Rabindra Nath Sharma	Rastriya Prajatantra Party	12 March 1997	6 October 1997
Minister for Forests and Environment	Sahana Pradhan	CPN (UML)	12 March 1997	25 March 1997
Minister for Women and Social Welfare	Sahana Pradhan	CPN (UML)	25 March 1997	6 October 1997
Minister for Information and Communications	Jhala Nath Khanal	CPN (UML)	25 March 1997	6 October 1997
Minister for Local Development	Amrit Kumar Bohara	CPN (UML)	12 March 1997	6 October 1997
Minister for Construction and Transportation	Bharat Mohan Adhikari	CPN (UML)	25 March 1997	6 October 1997
Minister for Health	Radha Krishna Mainali	CPN (UML)	12 March 1997	6 October 1997
Minister for Foreign Affairs	Prakash Chandra Lohani	Rastriya Prajatantra Party	25 March 1997	8 June 1997
Minister for General Administration	Siddhi Lal Singh	CPN (UML)	25 March 1997	6 October 1997
Minister for Housing and Physical Infrastructure	Kamal Thapa	Rastriya Prajatantra Party	25 March 1997	6 October 1997
Minister for Supplies	Gajendra Narayan Singh	Nepal Sadbhawana Party	12 March 1997	6 October 1997
Minister for Science and Technology	Gajendra Narayan Singh	Nepal Sadbhawana Party	12 March 1997	25 March 1997
Minister for Commerce	Budhhiman Tamang	Rastriya Prajatantra Party	25 March 1997	6 October 1997
Minister for Labour	Mukunda Neupane	CPN (UML)	25 March 1997	6 October 1997
Minister for Parliamentary Affairs	Ashok Kumar Rai	CPN (UML)	25 March 1997	6 October 1997
Minister for Industry	Keshav Prasad Badal	CPN (UML)	25 March 1997	6 October 1997
Minister for Youth, Sports and Culture	Bishnu Prasad Paudel	CPN (UML)	25 March 1997	6 October 1997
Minister for Tourism and Civil Aviation	Salim Miya Ansari	CPN (UML)	25 March 1997	6 October 1997
Minister without portfolio	Bhim Bahadur Kathayat	CPN (UML)	25 March 1997	6 October 1997
Minister for Law and Justice	Prem Bahadur Singh	CPN (UML)	25 March 1997	6 October 1997
Minister for Education	Devi Prasad Ojha	CPN (UML)	25 March 1997	6 October 1997
Minister for Agriculture	Ram Krishna Acharya	Rastriya Prajatantra Party	25 March 1997	6 October 1997
Minister for Population and Environment	Bidya Devi Bhandari	CPN (UML)	25 March 1997	6 October 1997
Minister for Law and Justice; Minister for Women and Social Welfare	Rameshwar Raya Yadav	Nepal Sadbhawana Party	12 March 1997	25 March 1997
Minister for Forests and Land Conservation	Rameshwar Raya Yadav	Nepal Sadbhawana Party	25 March 1997	6 October 1997
Minister without portfolio	Sarbendra Nath Shukla	Rastriya Prajatantra Party	25 March 1997	29 August 1997
Ministers of State
Minister of State for Information and Communications	Rakam Chemjong	CPN (UML)	25 March 1997	6 October 1997
Minister of State for Health	Bharat Kumar Pradhan	CPN (UML)	25 March 1997	6 October 1997
Minister of State for Agriculture	Prem Bahadur Bhandari	Rastriya Prajatantra Party	25 March 1997	29 August 1997
Minister of State for Water Supply	Rajiv Parajuli	Rastriya Prajatantra Party	25 March 1997	29 August 1997
Minister of State for Industry	Tul Bahadur Gurung	CPN (UML)	25 March 1997	6 October 1997
Minister of State for Education	Bhojraj Joshi	CPN (UML)	25 March 1997	6 October 1997
Minister of State for Local Development	Mahesh Chaudhary	CPN (UML)	25 March 1997	6 October 1997
Minister of State for Construction and Transportation	Mahindra Ray Yadav	CPN (UML)	25 March 1997	6 October 1997
Minister of State for Housing and Physical Infrastructure	Khobari Raya Yadav	Rastriya Prajatantra Party	25 March 1997	6 October 1997

=== June–August 1997 ===
Portfolio	Minister	Party	Took office	Left office
Prime Minister of Nepal; Minister for Palace Affairs; Minister for Defence	Lokendra Bahadur Chand	Rastriya Prajatantra Party	12 March 1997	6 October 1997
Deputy Prime Minister; Minister for Home Affairs	Bam Dev Gautam	CPN (UML)	12 March 1997	6 October 1997
Minister for Finance	Rabindra Nath Sharma	Rastriya Prajatantra Party	12 March 1997	6 October 1997
Minister for Women and Social Welfare	Sahana Pradhan	CPN (UML)	25 March 1997	6 October 1997
Minister for Information and Communications	Jhala Nath Khanal	CPN (UML)	25 March 1997	6 October 1997
Minister for Local Development	Amrit Kumar Bohara	CPN (UML)	12 March 1997	6 October 1997
Minister for Construction and Transportation	Bharat Mohan Adhikari	CPN (UML)	25 March 1997	6 October 1997
Minister for Health	Radha Krishna Mainali	CPN (UML)	12 March 1997	6 October 1997
Minister for General Administration	Siddhi Lal Singh	CPN (UML)	25 March 1997	6 October 1997
Minister for Housing and Physical Infrastructure	Kamal Thapa	Rastriya Prajatantra Party	25 March 1997	29 August 1997
Minister for Foreign Affairs	Kamal Thapa	Rastriya Prajatantra Party	8 June 1997	6 October 1997
Minister for Supplies	Gajendra Narayan Singh	Nepal Sadbhawana Party	12 March 1997	6 October 1997
Minister for Commerce	Budhhiman Tamang	Rastriya Prajatantra Party	25 March 1997	29 August 1997
Minister for Land Reform and Management	Budhhiman Tamang	Rastriya Prajatantra Party	8 June 1997	6 October 1997
Minister for Labour	Mukunda Neupane	CPN (UML)	25 March 1997	6 October 1997
Minister for Parliamentary Affairs	Ashok Kumar Rai	CPN (UML)	25 March 1997	6 October 1997
Minister for Industry	Keshav Prasad Badal	CPN (UML)	25 March 1997	6 October 1997
Minister for Youth, Sports and Culture	Bishnu Prasad Paudel	CPN (UML)	25 March 1997	6 October 1997
Minister for Tourism and Civil Aviation	Salim Miya Ansari	CPN (UML)	25 March 1997	6 October 1997
Minister without portfolio	Bhim Bahadur Kathayat	CPN (UML)	25 March 1997	6 October 1997
Minister for Law and Justice	Prem Bahadur Singh	CPN (UML)	25 March 1997	27 June 1997
Minister for Law and Justice	Prem Bahadur Singh	CPN (UML)	30 June 1997	6 October 1997
Minister for Education	Devi Prasad Ojha	CPN (UML)	25 March 1997	6 October 1997
Minister for Agriculture	Ram Krishna Acharya	Rastriya Prajatantra Party	25 March 1997	6 October 1997
Minister for Population and Environment	Bidya Devi Bhandari	CPN (UML)	25 March 1997	6 October 1997
Minister for Law and Justice Minister for Women and Social Welfare	Rameshwar Raya Yadav	Nepal Sadbhawana Party	12 March 1997	25 March 1997
Minister for Forests and Land Conservation	Rameshwar Raya Yadav	Nepal Sadbhawana Party	25 March 1997	27 June 1997
Minister for Forests and Land Conservation	Rameshwar Raya Yadav	Nepal Sadbhawana Party	30 June 1997	6 October 1997
Minister without portfolio	Sarbendra Nath Shukla	Rastriya Prajatantra Party	25 March 1997	29 August 1997
Ministers of State
Minister of State for Information and Communications	Rakam Chemjong	CPN (UML)	25 March 1997	6 October 1997
Minister of State for Health	Bharat Kumar Pradhan	CPN (UML)	25 March 1997	27 June 1997
Minister of State for Health	Bharat Kumar Pradhan	CPN (UML)	30 June 1997	6 October 1997
Minister of State for Agriculture	Prem Bahadur Bhandari	Rastriya Prajatantra Party	25 March 1997	29 August 1997
Minister of State for Water Supply	Rajiv Parajuli	Rastriya Prajatantra Party	25 March 1997	29 August 1997
Minister of State for Industry	Tul Bahadur Gurung	CPN (UML)	25 March 1997	6 October 1997
Minister of State for Education	Bhojraj Joshi	CPN (UML)	25 March 1997	6 October 1997
Minister of State for Local Development	Mahesh Chaudhary	CPN (UML)	25 March 1997	27 June 1997
Minister of State for Local Development	Mahesh Chaudhary	CPN (UML)	30 June 1997	6 October 1997
Minister of State for Construction and Transportation	Mahindra Ray Yadav	CPN (UML)	25 March 1997	6 October 1997
Minister of State for Housing and Physical Infrastructure	Khobari Raya Yadav	Rastriya Prajatantra Party	25 March 1997	6 October 1997
Minister of State for Land Reform and Management	Mahendra Raya	Rastriya Prajatantra Party	8 June 1997	29 August 1997
Minister of State for Commerce	Jyotendra Mohan Chaudhary	Rastriya Prajatantra Party	8 June 1997	29 August 1997
Minister of State for Science and Technology	Mirza Dilshad Beg	Rastriya Prajatantra Party	8 June 1997	29 August 1997

=== August–October 1997 ===
Portfolio	Minister	Party	Took office	Left office
Prime Minister of Nepal; Minister for Palace Affairs; Minister for Defence	Lokendra Bahadur Chand	Rastriya Prajatantra Party	12 March 1997	6 October 1997
Deputy Prime Minister; Minister for Home Affairs	Bam Dev Gautam	CPN (UML)	12 March 1997	6 October 1997
Minister for Finance	Rabindra Nath Sharma	Rastriya Prajatantra Party	12 March 1997	6 October 1997
Minister for Women and Social Welfare	Sahana Pradhan	CPN (UML)	25 March 1997	6 October 1997
Minister for Information and Communications	Jhala Nath Khanal	CPN (UML)	25 March 1997	6 October 1997
Minister for Local Development	Amrit Kumar Bohara	CPN (UML)	12 March 1997	6 October 1997
Minister for Construction and Transportation	Bharat Mohan Adhikari	CPN (UML)	25 March 1997	6 October 1997
Minister for Law and Justice	Bharat Mohan Adhikari	CPN (UML)	22 September 1997	6 October 1997
Minister for Health	Radha Krishna Mainali	CPN (UML)	12 March 1997	6 October 1997
Minister for General Administration	Siddhi Lal Singh	CPN (UML)	25 March 1997	6 October 1997
Minister for Housing and Physical Infrastructure	Balaram Gharti Magar	Rastriya Prajatantra Party	29 August 1997	6 October 1997
Minister for Foreign Affairs	Kamal Thapa	Rastriya Prajatantra Party	8 June 1997	6 October 1997
Minister for Supplies	Gajendra Narayan Singh	Nepal Sadbhawana Party	12 March 1997	22 September 1997
Minister without portfolio	Gajendra Narayan Singh	Nepal Sadbhawana Party	22 September 1997	26 September 1997
Minister for Land Reform and Management	Budhhiman Tamang	Rastriya Prajatantra Party	8 June 1997	6 October 1997
Minister for Labour	Mukunda Neupane	CPN (UML)	25 March 1997	6 October 1997
Minister for Parliamentary Affairs	Ashok Kumar Rai	CPN (UML)	25 March 1997	6 October 1997
Minister for Industry	Keshav Prasad Badal	CPN (UML)	25 March 1997	6 October 1997
Minister for Youth, Sports and Culture	Bishnu Prasad Paudel	CPN (UML)	25 March 1997	6 October 1997
Minister for Tourism and Civil Aviation	Salim Miya Ansari	CPN (UML)	25 March 1997	6 October 1997
Minister without portfolio	Bhim Bahadur Kathayat	CPN (UML)	25 March 1997	6 October 1997
Minister for Law and Justice	Prem Bahadur Singh	CPN (UML)	30 June 1997	22 September 1997
Minister for Education	Devi Prasad Ojha	CPN (UML)	25 March 1997	6 October 1997
Minister for Agriculture	Ram Krishna Acharya	Rastriya Prajatantra Party	25 March 1997	6 October 1997
Minister for Population and Environment	Bidya Devi Bhandari	CPN (UML)	25 March 1997	6 October 1997
Minister for Forests and Land Conservation	Rameshwar Raya Yadav	Nepal Sadbhawana Party	30 June 1997	11 September 1997
Minister for Forests and Land Conservation	Hridayesh Tripathi	Nepal Sadbhawana Party	11 September 1997	6 October 1997
Minister for Commerce	Sarbendra Nath Shukla	Rastriya Prajatantra Party	29 August 1997	6 October 1997
Minister for Science and Technology	Prem Bahadur Bhandari	Rastriya Prajatantra Party	29 August 1997	6 October 1997
Minister without portfolio	Rajiv Parajuli	Rastriya Prajatantra Party	29 August 1997	6 October 1997
Minister for Supplies	Moti Prasad Pahadi	Independent	22 September 1997	6 October 1997
Ministers of State
Minister of State for Information and Communications	Rakam Chemjong	CPN (UML)	25 March 1997	6 October 1997
Minister of State for Health	Bharat Kumar Pradhan	CPN (UML)	30 June 1997	6 October 1997
Minister of State for Industry	Tul Bahadur Gurung	CPN (UML)	25 March 1997	6 October 1997
Minister of State for Education	Bhojraj Joshi	CPN (UML)	25 March 1997	6 October 1997
Minister of State for Local Development	Mahesh Chaudhary	CPN (UML)	30 June 1997	6 October 1997
Minister of State for Construction and Transportation	Mahindra Ray Yadav	CPN (UML)	25 March 1997	6 October 1997
Minister of State for Agriculture	Jyotendra Mohan Chaudhary	Rastriya Prajatantra Party	29 August 1997	6 October 1997
Minister of State for Housing and Physical Infrastructure	Khobari Raya Yadav	Rastriya Prajatantra Party	25 March 1997	6 October 1997
Minister of State for Land Reform and Management	Mirza Dilshad Beg	Rastriya Prajatantra Party	29 August 1997	6 October 1997
Minister of State for Supplies	Palten Gurung	Independent	22 September 1997	6 October 1997
Minister of State for Forests and Land Conservation	Naresh Bahadur Singh	Independent	22 September 1997	6 October 1997
