= First Girija Prasad Koirala cabinet =

Government of Nepal from 1991 to 1994

- Cabinet of Nepal
- May 1991–November 1994
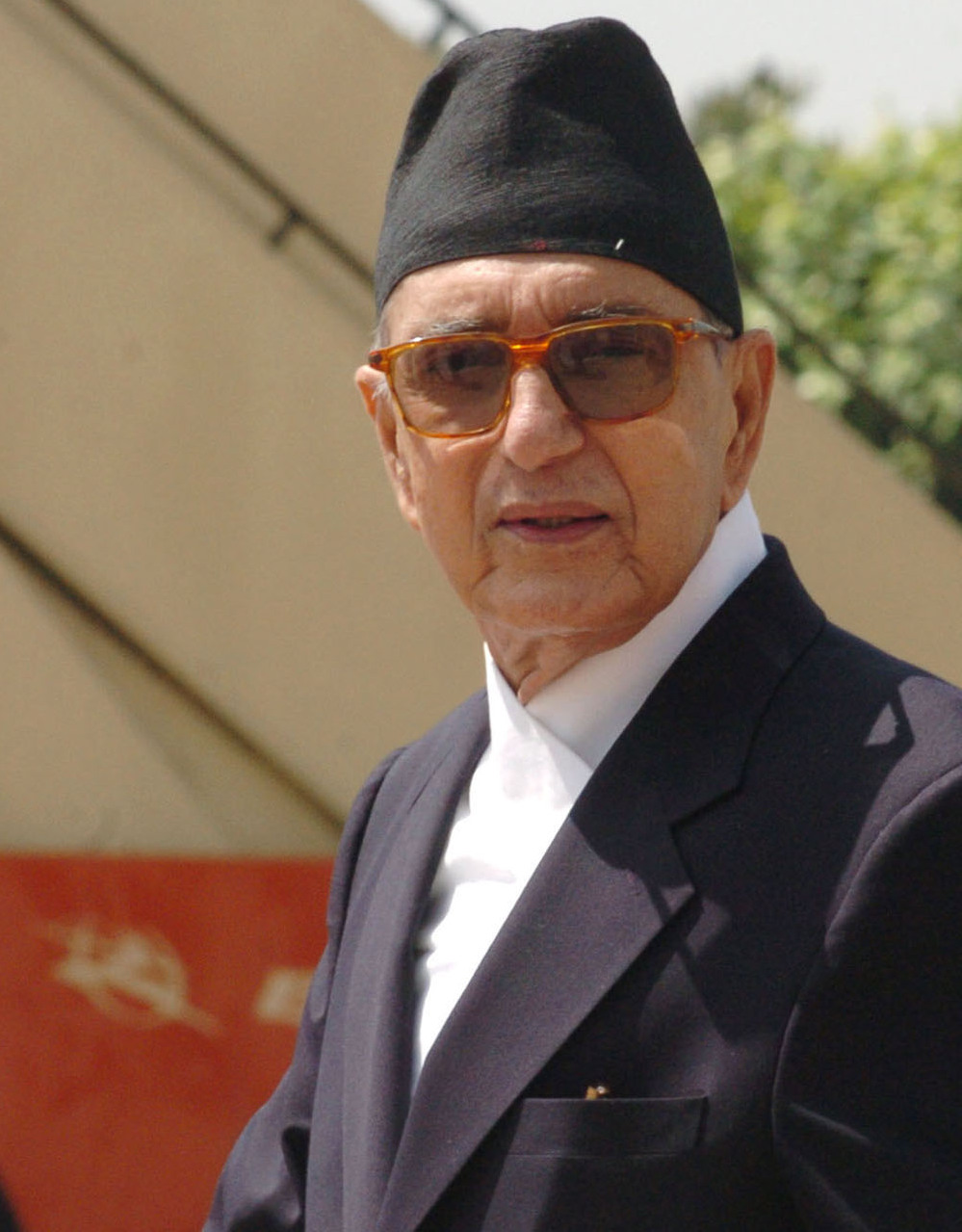
- Girija Prasad Koirala
- Date formed: 26 May 1991
- Date dissolved: 30 November 1994

People and organisations
- Monarch: King Birendra
- Prime Minister: Girija Prasad Koirala
- Total no. of members: 29 appointments
- Member party: Nepali Congress
- Status in legislature: Majority
- Opposition party: CPN (UML)
- Opposition leaders: Man Mohan Adhikari

History
- Election: 1991
- Legislature terms: 1991–1994
- Predecessor: K.P. Bhattarai interim cabinet
- Successor: Adhikari cabinet

The first Girija Prasad Koirala cabinet was formed on 26 May 1991 when Girija Prasad Koirala was appointed as prime minister by King Birendra following the 1991 election. The council of ministers was recommended by Koirala and were appointed on 29 May 1991. The cabinet was expanded with the appointment of two state ministers on 5 May 1991.

Koirala reshuffled the cabinet on 30 December 1991. Koirala resigned on 30 December 1994 after the appointment of Man Mohan Adhikari as prime minister following the 1994 election.

== Cabinet ==
=== May 1991–December 1991 ===
Portfolio	Minister	Took office	Left office
Prime Minister of Nepal; Minister for Defence; Minister for Foreign Affairs; Minister for Finance; Minister for Health; Minister for Palace Affairs	Girija Prasad Koirala	26 May 1991	30 November 1994
Minister for Water Supply; Minister for Communications	Basudev Risal	29 May 1991	30 December 1991
Minister for Settlement and Physical Infrastructure	Bal Bahadur Rai	29 May 1991	30 November 1994
Minister for Land Reform and Management	Jagannath Acharya	29 May 1991	30 November 1994
Minister for Labour and Social Welfare	Sheikh Idrish	29 May 1991	30 December 1991
Minister for Education and Culture; Minister for Tourism	Ram Hari Joshi	29 May 1991	30 November 1994
Minister for Forests, Land Conservation and Agriculture	Shailaja Acharya	29 May 1991	30 December 1991
Minister for Home Affairs	Sher Bahadur Deuba	29 May 1991	30 November 1994
Minister for Local Development	Ram Chandra Poudel	29 May 1991	30 November 1994
Minister for Industry	Dhundiraj Sharma Shastri	29 May 1991	30 December 1991
Minister for General Administration	Maheshwar Prasad Singh	29 May 1991	30 November 1994
Minister for Supplies	Chiranjibi Wagle	29 May 1991	30 December 1991
Minister for Law, Justice and Parliamentary Affairs	Taranath Ranabhat	29 May 1991	30 December 1991
Minister for Construction and Transportation	Khum Bahadur Khadka	29 May 1991	30 November 1994
Minister for Commerce	Gopal Man Shrestha	29 May 1991	30 December 1991
Ministers of State
Minister of State for Health	Ram Baran Yadav	5 July 1991	30 November 1994
Minister of State for Finance	Mahesh Acharya	5 July 1991	30 November 1994

=== December 1991–November 1994 ===
Portfolio	Minister	Took office	Left office
Prime Minister of Nepal; Minister for Defence; Minister for Foreign Affairs; Minister for Palace Affairs	Girija Prasad Koirala	26 May 1991	30 November 1994
Minister for Settlement and Physical Infrastructure	Bal Bahadur Rai	29 May 1991	30 November 1994
Minister for Land Reform and Management	Jagannath Acharya	29 May 1991	26 April 1993
Minister for Tourism	Ram Hari Joshi	29 May 1991	30 November 1994
Minister for Agriculture	Shailaja Acharya	30 December 1991	30 November 1994
Minister for Home Affairs	Sher Bahadur Deuba	29 May 1991	30 November 1994
Minister for Local Development	Ram Chandra Poudel	29 May 1991	30 November 1994
Minister for General Administration; Minister for Law, Justice and Parliamentary Affairs	Maheshwar Prasad Singh	29 May 1991	30 November 1994
Minister for Construction and Transportation	Khum Bahadur Khadka	29 May 1991	30 November 1994
Minister for Education, Culture and Social Welfare	Govinda Raj Joshi	30 December 1991	30 November 1994
Ministers of State
Minister of State for Health	Ram Baran Yadav	5 July 1991	30 November 1994
Minister of State for Finance	Mahesh Acharya	5 July 1991	30 November 1994
Minister of State for Commerce and Supplies	Aishwarya Lal Pradhananga	30 December 1991	27 June 1993
Minister of State for Commerce and Supplies	Surendra Prasad Chaudhary	27 June 1993	30 November 1994
Minister of State for Industry and Labour	Ram Krishna Tamrakar	30 December 1991	30 November 1994
Minister of State for Forests and Environment	Birmani Dhakal	30 December 1991	30 November 1994
Minister of State for Communications	Bijay Kumar Gachhadar	30 December 1991	30 November 1994
Minister of State for Water Supply	Laxman Prasad Ghimire	30 December 1991	30 November 1994
Minister of State for Land Reform and Management	Siddhiraj Ojha	26 April 1993	30 November 1994
Assistant Ministers
Assistant Minister for Land Reform and Management	Siddhiraj Ojha	30 December 1991	26 April 1993
Assistant Minister for General Administration; Assistant Minister for Law, Justice and Parliamentary Affairs	Dinbandhu Aryal	30 December 1991	30 November 1994
Assistant Minister for Construction and Transportation	Shiva Raj Joshi	30 December 1991	30 November 1994
Assistant Minister for Commerce and Supplies	Surendra Prasad Chaudhary	30 December 1991	27 June 1993
Assistant Minister for Education, Culture and Social Welfare	Hasta Bahadur Malla	30 December 1991	30 November 1994
Assistant Minister for Settlement and Physical Infrastructure	Dilendra Prasad Badu	30 December 1991	30 November 1994
Assistant Minister for Industry and Labour	Diwakar Man Sherchan	30 December 1991	30 November 1994
