= Second Oli cabinet =

Government of Nepal from 2018 to 2021

Oli cabinet, 2018
- Council of Ministers of Nepal

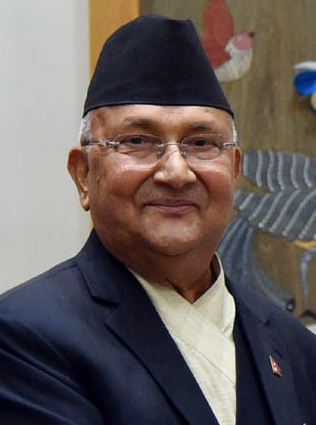
- Date formed: 15 February 2018
- Date dissolved: 12 July 2021

People and organisations
- President: Bidya Devi Bhandari
- Prime Minister: Khadga Prasad Sharma Oli
- Deputy Prime Ministers: Ishwor Pokhrel (2018-2021); Bishnu Prasad Paudel (2021); Raghubir Mahaseth (2021); Rajendra Mahato (2021)
- Member parties: CPN (Unified Marxist–Leninist); Former members: Nepal Communist Party (NCP); CPN (Maoist Centre); Samajbadi Party, Nepal; People's Socialist Party, Nepal; People's Progressive Party
- Status in legislature: Majority coalition government (February - May 2018, March - May 2021); Majority government (May 2018 - March 2021); Minority government (May - June 2021); Minority interim government (June - July 2021)
- Opposition cabinet: Deuba Shadow Cabinet
- Opposition party: Nepali Congress
- Opposition leader: Sher Bahadur Deuba, NC

History
- Election: 2017 general election
- Legislature term: 1st Federal Parliament
- Predecessor: Fourth Deuba cabinet
- Successor: Third Oli cabinet

The Second Oli cabinet, also known as the Oli cabinet, 2018, was the Government of Nepal from 15 February 2018 to 13 July 2021. It initially formed as a majority coalition on 15 February 2018, after Khadga Prasad Sharma Oli was elected as the new Prime Minister of Nepal following the 2017 general election. Oli's candidacy was supported by the Communist Party of Nepal (Unified Marxist–Leninist) and the Communist Party of Nepal (Maoist Centre). He assumed his office with two ministers and the remaining ministers were added at later points. The CPN (Maoist Centre) withdrew its support from the government in May 2021, reducing it to a minority, and after the dissolution of the House of Representatives, it turned into an interim government. The cabinet was replaced by the fifth Deuba cabinet, formed after the Supreme Court ordered the appointment of Nepali Congress president Sher Bahadur Deuba as prime minister under Article 76 (5) of the Constitution of Nepal.

Despite the name, the cabinet is not an extension of the first Oli cabinet, because two different cabinets by two different prime ministers separated both Oli cabinets. Apart from prime minister Oli, only four other ministers served in both cabinets: Giriraj Mani Pokharel and Shakti Bahadur Basnet, from in the beginning, and Bishnu Prasad Paudel and Top Bahadur Rayamajhi from a later rearrangement. Pokharel headed the Ministry of Education while Paudel headed the Ministry of Finance both times, whereas Basnet and Rayamajhi served in two different ministries in the two cabinets.

== History ==
The Constitution of Nepal set the maximum numbers of ministers including state ministers to 25. However, Oli decided to have 17 ministries under him, which is less than the previous cabinets, each around 30 ministries. On 26 February 2018, it increased by seven more ministers to 22 ministries. On 16 March 2018, the addition of three state ministers brought the number of cabinet members to 25.

On 11 March 2018, Oli won a motion of confidence with 208 of 268 in the 275-member House of Representatives.

On 17 May 2018, the Communist Party of Nepal (Unified Marxist–Leninist) and the Communist Party of Nepal (Maoist Centre) merged to form the Nepal Communist Party, giving the Oli government a majority in both houses of the federal parliament. On 28 May 2018, the Federal Socialist Forum, which would later merge into the Samajbadi Party on 6 May 2019, joined the government. The Samajbadi Party left the government on 24 December 2019.

Further reshuffles were on 20 November 2019 and 14 October 2020.

A major reshuffle took place on 25 December 2020 after several ministers resigned in protest of Oli's move to recommend the dissolution of the House of Representatives which was approved by the president, although later overturned by the Supreme Court. All ministers were in the Nepal Communist Party until 7 March 2021, when the party was dissolved by the Supreme Court. The verdict invalidated the ruling party, reviving the former CPN (UML) and CPN (Maoist Centre) parties. This reduced Oli's government back to a coalition government. The CPN (Maoist Centre) recalled its ministers on 13 March 2021 and withdrew its support from the government on 5 May 2021, turning it into a minority government. After Oli failed a vote of confidence in the parliament, his government was reduced to a caretaker capacity.

Oli became a minority prime minister on 13 May 2021 by president Bidya Devi Bhandari, as no opposition party formed a majority government or claimed it in time. Citing Article 76 (3) of the constitution, Oli, leading the largest party in the House of Representatives, was re-appointed prime minister, requiring him to again form a majority in the house within 30 days. Following the dissolution of the House of Representatives by the president at midnight on 22 May 2021, the Oli government turned into an interim government until elections on 12 and 19 November 2021.

Another major reshuffle took place on 4 June 2021, after the CPN (UML) formed a coalition with a faction of the People's Socialist Party, after negotiations awarded ten ministerial berths to the faction led by Mahantha Thakur and Rajendra Mahato. The cabinet was further expanded on 10 June 2021. The Supreme Court, on 22 June 2021, stayed the cabinet expansion and reshuffle by Prime Minister Oli. The petitioners claimed that a government formed under article 76 (3) of the constitution with a caretaker status cannot expand or reshuffle the cabinet. Twenty ministers (including three deputy prime ministers) appointed on 4 and 10 June 2021 were dismissed from their post. Bishnu Prasad Paudel remained minister of Finance from 14 October 2020, but no longer elevated to deputy prime minister like he was on 4 June 2021. Prime Minister Oli thereafter divided the portfolios among the five remaining cabinet members on 24 June 2021.

=== Dissolution ===
On 12 July 2021, the Supreme Court ruled that the president's decision to dissolve the House of Representatives on the recommendation of prime minister Oli was unconstitutional and ordered the appointment of Nepali Congress president Sher Bahadur Deuba as prime minister within 28 hours, after the opposition filed writs against the dissolution. President Bhandari appointed Deuba as the prime minister in accordance with Article 76 (5) of the Constitution of Nepal, and he was sworn in for a fifth term on 13 July 2021.

== Final arrangement ==
S.N.	Portfolio	Minister	Party	Assumed office	Left office
Cabinet ministers
1.	Prime Minister of Nepal; Minister of Defence (Note: Prime Minister Oli is in charge of the Ministry of Defence since 14 October 2020.); Minister of Foreign Affairs (Note: Prime Minister Oli is in charge of the Ministry of Foreign Affairs since 24 June 2021.)	Khadga Prasad Sharma Oli	Communist Party of Nepal (UML)	15 February 2018	12 July 2021
2.	Minister of Finance	Bishnu Prasad Paudel	Communist Party of Nepal (UML)	14 October 2020	12 July 2021
2.	Minister for Industry, Commerce and Supplies	Bishnu Prasad Paudel	Communist Party of Nepal (UML)	24 June 2021	12 July 2021
2.	Minister for Energy, Water Resources and Irrigation	Bishnu Prasad Paudel	Communist Party of Nepal (UML)	24 June 2021	12 July 2021
2.	Minister of Home Affairs	Bishnu Prasad Paudel	Communist Party of Nepal (UML)	24 June 2021	12 July 2021
3.	Minister for Forests and Environment	Krishna Gopal Shrestha	Communist Party of Nepal (UML)	24 June 2021	12 July 2021
3.	Minister for Youth and Sports	Krishna Gopal Shrestha	Communist Party of Nepal (UML)	24 June 2021	12 July 2021
3.	Minister for Education, Science and Technology	Krishna Gopal Shrestha	Communist Party of Nepal (UML)	25 December 2020	12 July 2021
3.	Minister for Labour, Employment, and Social Security	Krishna Gopal Shrestha	Communist Party of Nepal (UML)	24 June 2021	12 July 2021
3.	Minister for Health and Population	Krishna Gopal Shrestha	Communist Party of Nepal (UML)	24 June 2021	12 July 2021
4.	Minister for Agricultural and Livestock Development	Basanta Kumar Nembang	Communist Party of Nepal (UML)	24 June 2021	12 July 2021
4.	Minister for Water Supply	Basanta Kumar Nembang	Communist Party of Nepal (UML)	24 June 2021	12 July 2021
4.	Minister for Physical Infrastructure and Transport	Basanta Kumar Nembang	Communist Party of Nepal (UML)	21 November 2019	12 July 2021
4.	Minister for Information and Communications	Basanta Kumar Nembang	Communist Party of Nepal (UML)	24 June 2021	12 July 2021
4.	Minister for Urban Development	Basanta Kumar Nembang	Communist Party of Nepal (UML)	24 June 2021	12 July 2021
5.	Minister for Law, Justice and Parliamentary Affairs	Lilanath Shrestha	Communist Party of Nepal (UML)	25 December 2020	12 July 2021
5.	Minister for Land Management, Cooperatives and Poverty Alleviation	Lilanath Shrestha	Communist Party of Nepal (UML)	24 June 2021	12 July 2021
5.	Minister for Women, Children and Senior Citizen	Lilanath Shrestha	Communist Party of Nepal (UML)	24 June 2021	12 July 2021
5.	Minister for Culture, Tourism and Civil Aviation	Lilanath Shrestha	Communist Party of Nepal (UML)	24 June 2021	12 July 2021
5.	Minister for Federal Affairs and General Administration	Lilanath Shrestha	Communist Party of Nepal (UML)	24 June 2021	12 July 2021

== Previous arrangements ==
=== 4–22 June 2021 ===
Portfolio	Minister	Party	Assumed office	Left office
Cabinet ministers
Prime Minister of Nepal; Minister of Defence	Khadga Prasad Sharma Oli	Communist Party of Nepal (UML)	15 February 2018	
Deputy Prime Minister	Bishnu Prasad Paudel	Communist Party of Nepal (UML)	4 June 2021	22 June 2021
Minister of Finance	Bishnu Prasad Paudel	Communist Party of Nepal (UML)	14 October 2020	
Deputy Prime Minister; Minister of Foreign Affairs	Raghubir Mahaseth	Communist Party of Nepal (UML)	4 June 2021	22 June 2021
Deputy Prime Minister; Minister for Urban Development	Rajendra Mahato	People's Socialist Party, Nepal	4 June 2021	22 June 2021
Minister of Home Affairs	Khagaraj Adhikari	Communist Party of Nepal (UML)	10 June 2021	22 June 2021
Minister for Energy, Water Resources and Irrigation	Sharat Singh Bhandari	People's Socialist Party, Nepal	4 June 2021	22 June 2021
Minister for Education, Science and Technology	Krishna Gopal Shrestha	Communist Party of Nepal (UML)	25 December 2020	
Minister for Water Supply	Anil Kumar Jha	People's Socialist Party, Nepal	4 June 2021	22 June 2021
Minister for Health and Population	Sher Bahadur Tamang	Communist Party of Nepal (UML)	4 June 2021	22 June 2021
Minister for Industry, Commerce and Supplies	Raj Kishor Yadav	People's Socialist Party, Nepal	10 June 2021	22 June 2021
Minister for Land Management, Cooperatives and Poverty Alleviation	Laxmanlal Karna	People's Socialist Party, Nepal	4 June 2021	22 June 2021
Minister for Physical Infrastructure and Transport	Basanta Kumar Nembang	Communist Party of Nepal (UML)	21 November 2019	
Minister for Law, Justice and Parliamentary Affairs	Lila Nath Shrestha	Communist Party of Nepal (UML)	25 December 2020	
Minister for Information and Communications	Nainkala Thapa	Communist Party of Nepal (UML)	10 June 2021	22 June 2021
Minister for Agricultural and Livestock Development	Jwala Kumari Sah	Communist Party of Nepal (UML)	10 June 2021	22 June 2021
Minister for Labour, Employment, and Social Security	Bimal Prasad Shrivastav	People's Socialist Party, Nepal	4 June 2021	22 June 2021
Minister for Culture, Tourism and Civil Aviation	Uma Shankar Aragriya	People's Socialist Party, Nepal	4 June 2021	22 June 2021
Minister for Women, Children and Senior Citizen	Chanda Chaudhary	People's Socialist Party, Nepal	4 June 2021	22 June 2021
Minister for Youth and Sports	Ekbal Miya	People's Socialist Party, Nepal	4 June 2021	22 June 2021
Minister for Forests and Environment	Narad Muni Rana	Communist Party of Nepal (UML)	10 June 2021	22 June 2021
Minister for Federal Affairs and General Administration	Ganesh Kumar Pahadi	Communist Party of Nepal (UML)	10 June 2021	22 June 2021
Minister for the Office of the Prime Minister and Council of Ministers	Mohan Baniya	Communist Party of Nepal (UML)	10 June 2021	22 June 2021
State Ministers
State Minister for Energy, Water Resources and Irrigation	Chandra Kanta Chaudhary	People's Socialist Party, Nepal	4 June 2021	22 June 2021
State Minister for Women, Children and Senior Citizen	Renuka Gurung	People's Socialist Party, Nepal	4 June 2021	22 June 2021
State Minister for Forests and Environment	Asha Kumari B.K.	Communist Party of Nepal (UML)	10 June 2021	22 June 2021

=== December 2020 – June 2021 ===
Portfolio	Minister	Party	Assumed office	Left office
Cabinet ministers
Prime Minister of Nepal (Note: Prime Minister Oli was also in charge of the Ministry of Home Affairs, Ministry of Industry, Commerce and Supplies, Ministry of Urban Development, Ministry of Energy, Water Resources and Irrigation, Ministry of Labour, Employment and Social Security, Ministry of Water Supply and Ministry of Youth and Sports from 20 May 2021 until 4 June 2021.); Minister of Defence	Khadga Prasad Sharma Oli	Communist Party of Nepal (UML)	15 February 2018	
Deputy Prime Minister	Ishwor Pokharel	Communist Party of Nepal (UML)	1 June 2018	4 June 2021
Minister of Home Affairs	Ram Bahadur Thapa	Communist Party of Nepal (Maoist Centre)	26 February 2018	20 May 2021
Minister of Foreign Affairs	Pradip Kumar Gyawali	Communist Party of Nepal (UML)	16 March 2018	4 June 2021
Minister for Health and Population	Hridayesh Tripathi	People's Progressive Party	25 December 2020	4 June 2021
Minister for Physical Infrastructure and Transport	Basanta Kumar Nembang	Communist Party of Nepal (UML)	21 November 2019	
Minister for Industry, Commerce and Supplies	Lekh Raj Bhatta	Communist Party of Nepal (Maoist Centre)	21 November 2019	20 May 2021
Minister of Finance	Bishnu Prasad Paudel	Communist Party of Nepal (UML)	14 October 2020	
Minister for Information and Communications	Parbat Gurung	Communist Party of Nepal (UML)	14 October 2020	4 June 2021
Minister for Agricultural and Livestock Development	Padma Kumari Aryal	Communist Party of Nepal (UML)	25 December 2020	4 June 2021
Minister for Culture, Tourism and Civil Aviation	Bhanu Bhakta Dhakal	Communist Party of Nepal (UML)	25 December 2020	4 June 2021
Minister for Land Management, Cooperatives and Poverty Alleviation	Shiva Maya Tumbahamphe	Communist Party of Nepal (UML)	25 December 2020	4 June 2021
Minister for Education, Science and Technology	Krishna Gopal Shrestha	Communist Party of Nepal (UML)	25 December 2020	
Minister for Urban Development	Prabhu Shah	Communist Party of Nepal (Maoist Centre)	25 December 2020	20 May 2021
Minister for Energy, Water Resources and Irrigation	Top Bahadur Raymajhi	Communist Party of Nepal (Maoist Centre)	25 December 2020	20 May 2021
Minister for Women, Children and Senior Citizen	Julie Kumari Mahato	Communist Party of Nepal (UML)	25 December 2020	4 June 2021
Minister for Federal Affairs and General Administration	Ganesh Singh Thagunna	Communist Party of Nepal (UML)	25 December 2020	4 June 2021
Minister for Forests and Environment	Prem Bahadur Ale	Communist Party of Nepal (UML)	25 December 2020	4 June 2021
Minister for Law, Justice and Parliamentary Affairs	Lila Nath Shrestha	Communist Party of Nepal (UML)	25 December 2020	4 June 2021
Minister for Labour, Employment, and Social Security	Gauri Shankar Chaudhary	Communist Party of Nepal (Maoist Centre)	25 December 2020	20 May 2021
Minister of Water Supply	Mani Thapa	Communist Party of Nepal (Maoist Centre)	25 December 2020	20 May 2021
Minister for Youth and Sports	Dawa Lama Tamang	Communist Party of Nepal (Maoist Centre)	25 December 2020	20 May 2021
State Ministers
State Minister for Health and Population	Navaraj Rawat	Communist Party of Nepal (UML)	21 November 2019	4 June 2021
State Minister for Urban Development	Ram Bir Manandhar	Communist Party of Nepal (UML)	21 November 2019	4 June 2021
State Minister for Industry, Commerce and Supplies	Bimala B.K.	Communist Party of Nepal (UML)	25 December 2020	4 June 2021

=== October – December 2020 ===
Portfolio	Minister	Party	Assumed office	Left office
Cabinet ministers
Prime Minister of Nepal; Minister of Defence	Khadga Prasad Sharma Oli	Nepal Communist Party (Note: Elected to the Pratinidhi Sabha as member of the Communist Party of Nepal (Unified Marxist–Leninist).)	15 February 2018	
Deputy Prime Minister	Ishwor Pokharel	Nepal Communist Party	1 June 2018	
Minister of Home Affairs	Ram Bahadur Thapa	Nepal Communist Party (Note: Elected to the Pratinidhi Sabha as member of the Communist Party of Nepal (Maoist Centre).)	26 February 2018	
Minister of Foreign Affairs	Pradip Kumar Gyawali	Nepal Communist Party	16 March 2018	
Minister for Federal Affairs and General Administration	Hridayesh Tripathi	Nepal Communist Party	21 November 2019	25 December 2020
Minister for Education, Science and Technology	Giriraj Mani Pokharel	Nepal Communist Party	16 March 2018	20 December 2020
Minister for Energy, Water Resources and Irrigation	Barsaman Pun	Nepal Communist Party	16 March 2018	20 December 2020
Minister for Forests and Environment	Shakti Bahadur Basnet	Nepal Communist Party	16 March 2018	20 December 2020
Minister of Water Supply	Bina Magar	Nepal Communist Party	16 March 2018	20 December 2020
Minister for Youth and Sports	Jagat Bahadur Bishwakarma	Nepal Communist Party	16 March 2018	25 December 2020
Minister for Land Management, Cooperatives and Poverty Alleviation	Padma Kumari Aryal	Nepal Communist Party	3 August 2018	25 December 2020
Minister for Culture, Tourism and Civil Aviation	Yogesh Bhattarai	Nepal Communist Party	31 July 2019	20 December 2020
Minister for Health and Population	Bhanu Bhakta Dhakal	Nepal Communist Party	20 November 2019	25 December 2020
Minister for Labour, Employment, and Social Security	Rameshwor Raya Yadav	Nepal Communist Party	20 November 2019	20 December 2020
Minister for Physical Infrastructure and Transport	Basanta Kumar Nembang	Nepal Communist Party	21 November 2019	
Minister for Industry, Commerce and Supplies	Lekh Raj Bhatta	Nepal Communist Party	21 November 2019	
Minister for Agricultural and Livestock Development	Ghanashyam Bhusal	Nepal Communist Party	21 November 2019	20 December 2020
Minister for Law, Justice and Parliamentary Affairs	Shiva Maya Tumbahamphe	Nepal Communist Party	17 February 2020	25 December 2020
Minister of Finance	Bishnu Prasad Paudel	Nepal Communist Party	14 October 2020	
Minister for Information and Communications	Parbat Gurung	Nepal Communist Party	14 October 2020	
Minister for Women, Children and Senior Citizen	Lila Nath Shrestha	Nepal Communist Party	14 October 2020	25 December 2020
Minister for Urban Development	Krishna Gopal Shrestha	Nepal Communist Party	14 October 2020	25 December 2020
State Ministers
State Minister for Health and Population	Navaraj Rawat	Nepal Communist Party	21 November 2019	
State Minister for Industry, Commerce and Supplies	Moti Lal Dugar	Nepal Communist Party	21 November 2019	25 December 2020
State Minister for Urban Development	Ram Bir Manandhar	Nepal Communist Party	21 November 2019	

=== November 2019 – October 2020 ===
Portfolio	Minister	Party	Assumed office	Left office
Cabinet ministers
Prime Minister of Nepal	Khadga Prasad Sharma Oli	Nepal Communist Party	15 February 2018	
Deputy Prime Minister	Ishwor Pokharel	Nepal Communist Party	1 June 2018	
Minister of Defense (Note: Pokharel was stripped the portfolio on 14 October 2020, but still remains part of the Council of Minister and is expected to get a new portfolio.)	Ishwor Pokharel	Nepal Communist Party	26 February 2018	14 October 2020
Deputy Prime Minister Minister for Law, Justice and Parliamentary Affairs	Upendra Yadav	Samajbadi Party, Nepal (Note: Elected to the Pratinidhi Sabha as member of the Federal Socialist Forum, Nepal.)	21 November 2019	24 December 2019
Minister of Home Affairs	Ram Bahadur Thapa	Nepal Communist Party	26 February 2018	
Minister of Finance	Yuba Raj Khatiwada (Note: Served partially as a minister with two portfolios.) (Note: Khatiwada had to resign from his ministerial posts on 3 March 2020, as his two-year term in the Rastriya Sabha ended, however he was reappointed only on the next day)	Nepal Communist Party	26 February 2018	4 September 2020
Minister for Information and Communications	Yuba Raj Khatiwada	Nepal Communist Party	20 February 2020	4 September 2020
Minister for Information and Communications	Gokul Prasad Baskota	Nepal Communist Party	1 June 2018	20 February 2020
Minister for Urban Development	Gokul Prasad Baskota	Nepal Communist Party	10 January 2020	20 February 2020
Minister for Urban Development	Mohammad Estiyak Rai	Samajbadi Party, Nepal	1 June 2018	24 December 2019
Minister for Urban Development	Basanta Kumar Nembang	Nepal Communist Party	20 February 2020	14 October 2020
Minister for Physical Infrastructure and Transport	Basanta Kumar Nembang	Nepal Communist Party	21 November 2019	
Minister of Foreign Affairs	Pradip Kumar Gyawali	Nepal Communist Party	16 March 2018	
Minister for Education, Science and Technology	Giriraj Mani Pokharel	Nepal Communist Party	16 March 2018	20 December 2020
Minister for Energy, Water Resources and Irrigation	Barsaman Pun	Nepal Communist Party	16 March 2018	20 December 2020
Minister for Forests and Environment	Shakti Bahadur Basnet	Nepal Communist Party	16 March 2018	20 December 2020
Minister of Water Supply	Bina Magar	Nepal Communist Party	16 March 2018	20 December 2020
Minister for Youth and Sports	Jagat Bahadur Bishwakarma	Nepal Communist Party	16 March 2018	25 December 2020
Minister for Land Management, Cooperatives and Poverty Alleviation	Padma Kumari Aryal	Nepal Communist Party	3 August 2018	25 December 2020
Minister for Culture, Tourism and Civil Aviation	Yogesh Bhattarai	Nepal Communist Party	31 July 2019	20 December 2020
Minister for Health and Population	Bhanu Bhakta Dhakal (Note: Dhakal served twice as the Minister for Law, Justice and Parliamentary Affairs)	Nepal Communist Party	20 November 2019	25 December 2020
Minister for Law, Justice and Parliamentary Affairs	Bhanu Bhakta Dhakal	Nepal Communist Party	10 January 2020	17 February 2020
Minister for Law, Justice and Parliamentary Affairs	Shiva Maya Tumbahamphe	Nepal Communist Party	17 February 2020	25 December 2020
Minister for Federal Affairs and General Administration	Hridayesh Tripathi	People's Progressive Party	21 November 2019	25 December 2020
Minister for Labour, Employment, and Social Security	Rameshwor Raya Yadav	Nepal Communist Party	20 November 2019	20 December 2020
Minister for Women, Children and Senior Citizen	Parbat Gurung	Nepal Communist Party	21 November 2019	14 October 2020
Minister for Industry, Commerce and Supplies	Lekh Raj Bhatta	Nepal Communist Party	21 November 2019	
Minister for Agricultural and Livestock Development	Ghanashyam Bhusal	Nepal Communist Party	21 November 2019	20 December 2020
State Ministers
State Minister for Health and Population	Navaraj Rawat	Nepal Communist Party	21 November 2019	
State Minister for Industry, Commerce and Supplies	Moti Lal Dugar	Nepal Communist Party	21 November 2019	25 December 2020
State Minister for Urban Development	Ram Bir Manandhar	Nepal Communist Party	21 November 2019	

=== February 2018 – November 2019 ===
Portfolio	Minister	Party	Assumed office	Left office
Cabinet ministers
Prime Minister of Nepal (Note: Prime Minister Oli was also in charge of the Ministry of Health and Population and the Ministry of Urban Development from February 2018 until 31 May 2018.) (Note: Prime Minister Oli was also in charge of the Ministry of Culture, Tourism and Civil Aviation from 1 March until 30 July 2019.)	Khadga Prasad Sharma Oli	Nepal Communist Party	15 February 2018	
Deputy Prime Minister (Note: Pokharel was appointed Deputy Prime Minister on 1 June 2018, prior to that he only served as Minister of Defence.) Minister of Defense	Ishwor Pokharel	Nepal Communist Party	26 February 2018	
Deputy Prime Minister Minister for Health and Population	Upendra Yadav	Samajbadi Party, Nepal	1 June 2018	20 November 2019
Minister for Women, Children and Senior Citizen	Tham Maya Thapa (Note: Tham Maya Thapa was given the portfolio of Women, Children and Social Welfare which was converted to Ministry of Labour, Employment, Women, Children and Social Security following the ministry reorganization of 23 February 2018. The ministry's portfolio was again adjusted to Ministry of Women, Children and Senior Citizen on 17 March 2018.)	Nepal Communist Party	15 February 2018	20 November 2019
Minister of Home Affairs	Ram Bahadur Thapa	Nepal Communist Party	26 February 2018	
Minister of Finance	Yuba Raj Khatiwada	Nepal Communist Party	26 February 2018	4 September 2020
Minister for Industry, Commerce and Supplies	Matrika Yadav	Nepal Communist Party	26 February 2018	20 November 2019
Minister for Physical Infrastructure and Transport	Raghubir Mahaseth	Nepal Communist Party	16 March 2018	20 November 2019
Minister for Federal Affairs and General Administration	Lal Babu Pandit (Note: Lal Babu Pandit was given the portfolio of Population and Environment on 15 February 2018 which was converted to Ministry of Health and Population following the ministry reorganization of 23 February 2018. His portfolio was changed to Federal Affairs and General Administration on 16 March 2018.)	Nepal Communist Party	16 March 2018	20 November 2019
Minister of Foreign Affairs	Pradip Kumar Gyawali	Nepal Communist Party	16 March 2018	
Minister for Education, Science and Technology	Giriraj Mani Pokharel	Nepal Communist Party	16 March 2018	20 December 2020
Minister for Culture, Tourism and Civil Aviation	Rabindra Prasad Adhikari	Nepal Communist Party	16 March 2018	27 February 2019 (Deceased)
Minister for Culture, Tourism and Civil Aviation	Yogesh Bhattarai	Nepal Communist Party	31 July 2019	20 December 2020
Minister for Law, Justice and Parliamentary Affairs	Sher Bahadur Tamang	Nepal Communist Party	16 March 2018	24 July 2018
Minister for Law, Justice and Parliamentary Affairs	Bhanu Bhakta Dhakal	Nepal Communist Party	3 August 2018	20 November 2019
Minister for Energy, Water Resources and Irrigation	Barsaman Pun	Nepal Communist Party	16 March 2018	20 December 2020
Minister for Labour, Employment, and Social Security	Gokarna Bista	Nepal Communist Party	16 March 2018	20 November 2019
Minister for Forests and Environment	Shakti Bahadur Basnet	Nepal Communist Party	16 March 2018	20 December 2020
Minister of Water Supply	Bina Magar	Nepal Communist Party	16 March 2018	20 December 2020
Minister for Agricultural and Livestock Development	Chakrapani Khanal (Note: Chakrapani Khanal was in charge of the Ministry of Agriculture, Land Management and Cooperatives until 2 August 2018, however, due to a cabinet expansion, Padma Kumari Aryal became the new Minister of Land Management, Cooperatives and Poverty Alleviation, while Khanal's portfolio was changed to Ministry of Agricultural and Livestock Development.)	Nepal Communist Party	16 March 2018	20 November 2019
Minister for Youth and Sports	Jagat Bahadur Bishwakarma	Nepal Communist Party	16 March 2018	25 December 2020
Minister for Information and Communications	Gokul Prasad Baskota (Note: Gokul Prasad Baskota served as State Minister for Information and Communications from 16 March 2018 until 31 May 2018, before being promoted to Minister for Information and Communications on 1 June 2018.)	Nepal Communist Party	1 June 2018	20 February 2020
Minister for Urban Development	Mohammad Estiyak Rai	Samajbadi Party, Nepal	1 June 2018	24 December 2019
Minister for Land Management, Cooperatives and Poverty Alleviation	Padma Kumari Aryal	Nepal Communist Party	3 August 2018	25 December 2020
State Ministers
State Minister for Agricultural and Livestock Development	Ram Kumari Chaudhary (Note: Ram Kumari Chaudhary was sworn in as State Minister at the Ministry of Agriculture, Land Management and Cooperatives. However, due to a cabinet expansion, the ministry's portfolio was changed to the Ministry of Agricultural and Livestock Development.)	Nepal Communist Party	16 March 2018	20 November 2019
State Minister for Culture, Tourism and Civil Aviation	Dhan Bahadur Budha	Nepal Communist Party	16 March 2018	20 November 2019
State Minister for Information and Communications	Gokul Prasad Baskota	Nepal Communist Party	16 March 2018	31 May 2018
State Minister for Health and Population	Padma Kumari Aryal	Nepal Communist Party	16 March 2018	3 August 2018
State Minister for Health and Population	Surendra Kumar Yadav	Samajbadi Party, Nepal	3 August 2018	20 November 2019

== See also ==
- First Oli cabinet
