= 2nd House of Representatives (Nepal) =

←	3rd Panchayat	3rd HoR	→
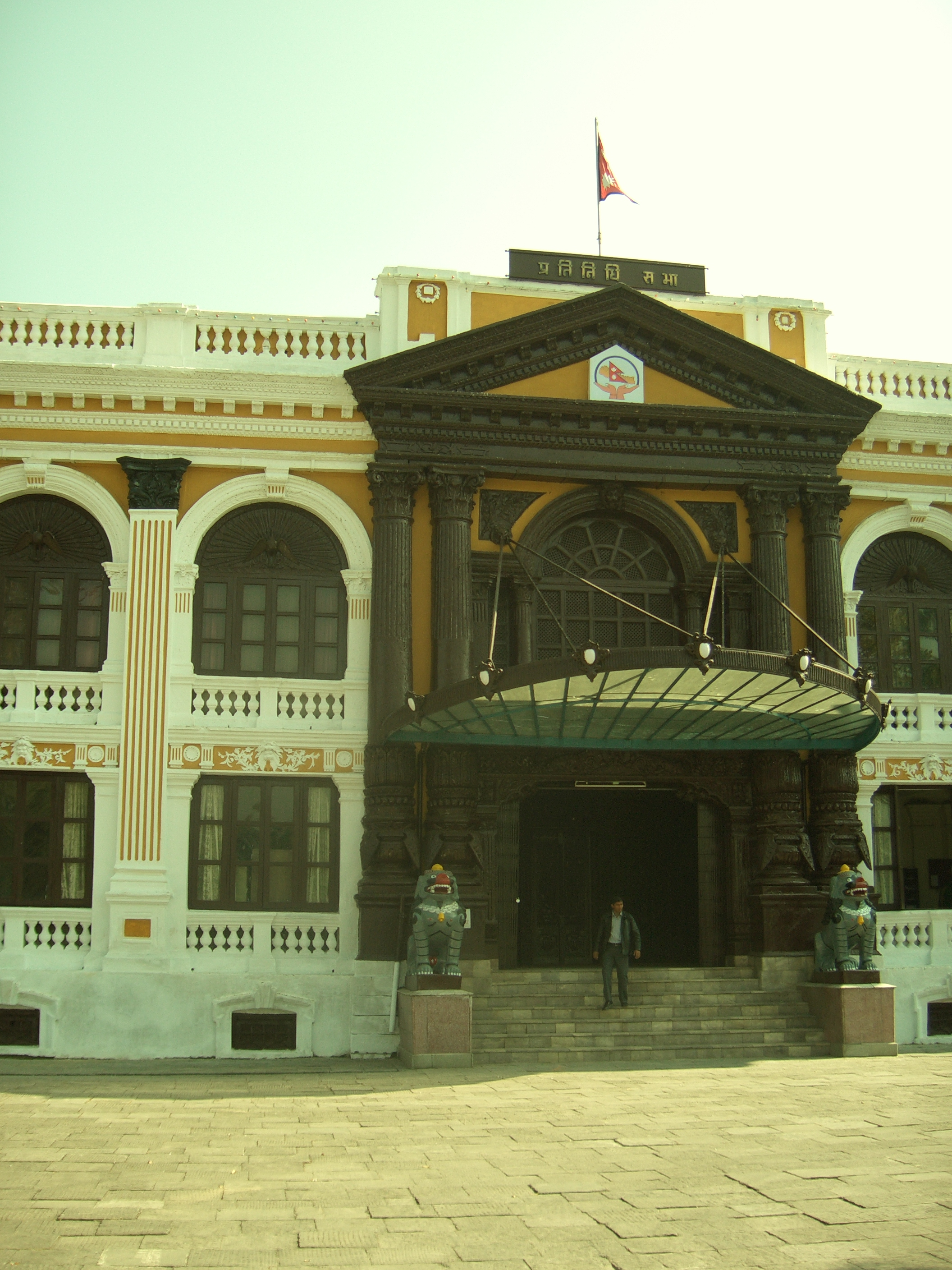
- Gallery Baithak

Overview
- Legislative body: Parliament of the Kingdom of Nepal
- Jurisdiction: Kingdom of Nepal
- Meeting place: Gallery Baithak
- Term: 20 June 1991 – 11 July 1994
- Election: 1991 general election
- Government: First G.P. Koirala cabinet

House of Representatives
- Members: 205
- Speaker: Daman Nath Dhungana (NC)
- Deputy Speaker: Mahantha Thakur (NC)
- Prime Minister: Girija Prasad Koirala (NC)
- Leader of the Opposition: Man Mohan Adhikari (UML)

Sessions
- 1st: 20 June 1991 – 29 September 1991
- 2nd: 21 February 1992 – 15 March 1992
- 3rd: 29 June 1992 – 16 September 1992
- 4th: 14 February 1993 – 7 April 1993
- 5th: 27 June 1993 – 16 September 1993
- 6th: 8 March 1994 – 8 April 1994
- 7th: 29 June 1994 – 11 July 1994

The 2nd House of Representatives was elected at the 1991 Nepalese general election. All 205 members were elected from constituencies using the first-past-the-post system.

The list of elected members is arranged by constituency. Daman Nath Dhungana served as the Speaker, Girija Prasad Koirala served as Prime Minister and Man Mohan Adhikari served as Leader of Opposition.

== House composition ==
2nd House of Representatives

Parliament at dissolution

Parliament at start of term

Party	Members	
Party	After election	At dissolution
Nepali Congress	110	114
CPN (UML)	69	68
Samyukta Janamorcha	9	9
Nepal Sadhbhawana	6	6
Rastriya Prajatantra Party (Note: RPP (Chand) and RPP (Thapa) merged to form RPP in 1991)	—	4
CPN (United) (Note: Elected from CPN (Democratic). CPN (Democratic) merged into CPN (United) in 1991)	2	2
Nepal Workers Peasants Party	2	2
RPP (Thapa)	1	—
RPP (Chand)	3	—
Independent	3	—
Total	205	205

== Leaders ==
=== Presiding officers ===
- Speaker of the House: Daman Nath Dhungana (Nepali Congress)
- Deputy Speaker of the House: Mahantha Thakur (Nepali Congress)

=== Parliamentary party ===
- Prime Minister of Nepal: Hon. Girija Prasad Koirala (Nepali Congress)
- Leader of the Opposition: Hon. Man Mohan Adhikari (CPN (UML))
- Parliamentary party leader of Samyukta Janamorcha Nepal:
  - Hon. Lila Mani Pokharel (until 30 June 1993)
  - Hon. Amik Sherchan (from 30 June 1993)
- Parliamentary party leader of Nepal Sadbhawana Party: Hon. Gajendra Narayan Singh

=== Whips ===
- Chief Whip of Nepali Congress:
  - Hon. Govinda Raj Joshi (until 29 December 1991)
  - Hon. Tarini Dutt Chataut (from 14 February 1992)
- Whip of Nepali Congress:
  - Hon. Surendra Prasad Chaudhary (until 29 December 1991)
  - Hon. Chin Kaji Shrestha (from 14 February 1992)

== Members of the House ==
Constituency	Winner	Party
Taplejung 1	Kul Prasad Uprety	CPN (UML)
Taplejung 2	Ambika Sawa	CPN (UML)
Panchthar 1	Basanta Kumar Nemwang	CPN (UML)
Panchthar 2	Damber Sing Sambahamphe	CPN (UML)
Ilam 1	Jhala Nath Khanal	CPN (UML)
Ilam 2	Mani Kumar Limbu	Nepali Congress
Jhapa 1	Krishna Prasad Sitaula	Nepali Congress
Jhapa 2	Devi Prasad Ojha	CPN (UML)
Jhapa 3	Radha Krishna Mainali	CPN (UML)
Jhapa 4	Narayan Rajbanshi	CPN (UML)
Jhapa 5	Chandra Prakash Mainali	CPN (UML)
Jhapa 6	K. P. Sharma Oli	CPN (UML)
Sankhuwasabha 1	Parshuram Megi Gurung	CPN (UML)
Sankhuwasabha 2	Ghanendra Basnet	CPN (UML)
Tehrathum 1	Bijaya Subba	CPN (UML)
Tehrathum 2	Surya Prasad Kandangwa	CPN (UML)
Bhojpur 1	Narendra Basnet	CPN (UML)
Bhojpur 2	Hem Raj Rai	CPN (UML)
Bhojpur 3	Dhan Harka Rai	CPN (UML)
Dhankuta 1	Rakam Chemjong	CPN (UML)
Dhankuta 2	Gopal Guragain	CPN (UML)
Morang 1	Girija Prasad Koirala	Nepali Congress
Morang 2	Bharat Mohan Adhikari	CPN (UML)
Morang 3	Lal Babu Pandit	CPN (UML)
Morang 4	Harka Man Tamang	CPN (UML)
Morang 5	Shailaja Acharya	Nepali Congress
Morang 6	Shyam Lal Tawedar	Nepali Congress
Sunsari 1	Man Mohan Adhikari	CPN (UML)
Sunsari 2	Bijay Kumar Gachhadar	Nepali Congress
Sunsari 3	Prakash Koirala	Nepali Congress
Sunsari 4	Khalil Miya	Nepali Congress
Solukhumbu 1	Bal Bahadur K.C.	Nepali Congress
Khotang 1	Tanka Rai	CPN (UML)
Khotang 2	Kul Prasad Sharma	CPN (UML)
Khotang 3	Ashok Kumar Rai	CPN (UML)
Okhaldhunga 1	Bal Raj Karki	Nepali Congress
Okhaldhunga 2	Bal Bahadur Rai	Nepali Congress
Udayapur 1	Laxmi Narayan Chaudhary	CPN (UML)
Udayapur 2	Bishnu Bahadur Raut	CPN (UML)
Saptari 1	Hira Lal Chaudhary	CPN (UML)
Saptari 2	Gajendra Narayan Singh	Nepal Sadbhawana Party
Saptari 3	Hari Prasad Raya Amat	Nepali Congress
Saptari 4	Kuber Prasad Sharma	Nepali Congress
Saptari 5	Durganand Prasad Singh	Nepali Congress
Siraha 1	Padma Narayan Chaudhary	Nepali Congress
Siraha 2	Nathuni Singh Danuwar	Nepali Congress
Siraha 3	Suresh Chandra Das	Nepali Congress
Siraha 4	Raj Dev Gohit	Nepali Congress
Siraha 5	Bishnu Bahadur Tamang	Samyukta Janamorcha
Dolakha 1	Indra Bahadur Khadka	CPN (UML)
Dolakha 2	Jit Bir Tamang Lama	CPN (UML)
Ramechhap 1	Laxman Prasad Ghimire	Nepali Congress
Ramechhap 2	Kamal Prasad Chaulagain	Samyukta Janamorcha
Sindhuli 1	Madan Dhungel	CPN (UML)
Sindhuli 2	Prakash Koirala	Nepali Congress
Sindhuli 3	Dhruba Prakash Sharma	Nepali Congress
Dhanusha 1	Shivadhari Yadav	Nepali Congress
Dhanusha 2	Lila Koirala	Nepali Congress
Dhanusha 3	Ananda Prasad Dhungana	Nepali Congress
Dhanusha 4	Mahendra Narayan Nidhi	Nepali Congress
Dhanusha 5	Ram Baran Yadav	Nepali Congress
Mahottari 1	Mahendra Raya Yadav	Nepali Congress
Mahottari 2	Hari Shankar Mishra	Nepali Congress
Mahottari 3	Maheshwar Prasad Singh	Nepali Congress
Mahottari 4	Beni Madav Singh	Nepali Congress
Mahottari 5	Basanta Kumar Gurung	Nepali Congress
Sarlahi 1	Brahma Narayan Chaudhary	Nepali Congress
Sarlahi 2	Mina Pandey	Nepali Congress
Sarlahi 3	Ram Hari Joshi	Nepali Congress
Sarlahi 4	Baidya Nath Mahato	CPN (Democratic)
Sarlahi 5	Mahantha Thakur	Nepali Congress
Rasuwa 1	Ram Krishna Udpadhyaya	Rastriya Prajatantra Party
Dhading 1	Daan Pakhrin Tamang	Nepali Congress
Dhading 2	Ganga Lal Tuladhar	CPN (UML)
Dhading 3	Rajendra Prasad Pandey	CPN (UML)
Nuwakot 1	Prakash Chandra Lohani	Rastriya Prajatantra Party
Nuwakot 2	Ganesh Pandit	CPN (UML)
Nuwakot 3	Arjun Narasingha K.C.	Nepali Congress
Kathmandu 1	Bidhya Devi Bhandari	CPN (UML)
Kathmandu 2	Daman Nath Dhungana	Nepali Congress
Kathmandu 3	Padma Ratna Tuladhar	CPN (UML)
Kathmandu 4	Sahana Pradhan	CPN (UML)
Kathmandu 5	Krishna Gopal Shrestha	CPN (UML)
Bhaktapur 1	Narayan Man Bijukchhe	Nepal Workers Peasants Party
Bhaktapur 2	Jagannath Acharya	Nepali Congress
Lalitpur 1	Mitha Ram Sharma	CPN (UML)
Lalitpur 2	Siddhi Lal Singh	CPN (UML)
Lalitpur 3	Lila Mani Pokharel	Samyukta Janamorcha
Kavrepalanchok 1	Kaman Singh Lama	Samyukta Janamorcha
Kavrepalanchok 2	Shiva Kumar Deuja	CPN (UML)
Kavrepalanchok 3	Keshab Prasad Badal	CPN (UML)
Kavrepalanchok 4	Govinda Nath Upreti	CPN (UML)
Sindhupalchok 1	Amrit Kumar Bohara	CPN (UML)
Sindhupalchok 2	Krishna Raj Shreshtha	CPN (UML)
Sindhupalchok 3	Pashupati SJB Rana	Rastriya Prajatantra Party
Makwanpur 1	Krishna Prasad Dahal	CPN (UML)
Makwanpur 2	Birodh Khatiwada	CPN (UML)
Makwanpur 3	Hiranya Lal Shrestha	CPN (UML)
Rautahat 1	Bajra Kishore Singh	Nepali Congress
Rautahat 2	Sheikh Idrish	Nepali Congress
Rautahat 3	Govinda Chaudhary	Nepali Congress
Rautahat 4	Bansidhar Mishra	CPN (UML)
Bara 1	Mukunda Neupane	CPN (UML)
Bara 2	Sohan Prasad Chaudhary	CPN (UML)
Bara 3	Rishikesh Gautam	Nepali Congress
Bara 4	Salim Miya Ansari	CPN (UML)
Parsa 1	Atma Ram Ojha Bahun	Nepali Congress
Parsa 2	Ram Chandra Prasad Kushwaha	Nepali Congress
Parsa 3	Surendra Prasad Chaudhary	Nepali Congress
Parsa 4	Ramesh Rijal	Nepali Congress
Chitwan 1	Jagrit Prasad Bhetawal	CPN (UML)
Chitwan 2	Bhim Bahadur Shrestha	CPN (Democratic)
Chitwan 3	Amik Sherchan	Samyukta Janamorcha
Gorkha 1	Chiranjibi Wagle	Nepali Congress
Gorkha 2	Maiya Devi Shrestha	Nepali Congress
Gorkha 3	Chin Kaji Shrestha	Nepali Congress
Manang 1	Palten Gurung	Nepali Congress
Lamjung 1	Ram Chandra Adhikari	Nepali Congress
Lamjung 2	Ram Bahadur Gurung	Nepali Congress
Kaski 1	Taranath Ranabhat	Nepali Congress
Kaski 2	Tula Bahadur Gurung	CPN (UML)
Kaski 3	Somnath Adhikari Pyasi	CPN (UML)
Tanahu 1	Ram Chandra Poudel	Nepali Congress
Tanahu 2	Govinda Raj Joshi	Nepali Congress
Tanahu 3	Kiran Gurung	CPN (UML)
Syangja 1	Gopal Man Shrestha	Nepali Congress
Syangja 2	Rudra Man Gurung	Nepali Congress
Syangja 3	Din Bandhu Aryal	Nepali Congress
Gulmi 1	Jhak Bahadur Pun	Nepali Congress
Gulmi 2	Bhagwat Gyawali	Nepali Congress
Gulmi 3	Rudra Mani Bhandari	Nepali Congress
Palpa 1	Kalu Ram Rana	Nepali Congress
Palpa 2	Gambir Jang Karki	Nepali Congress
Palpa 3	Hari Prasad Nepal	Nepali Congress
Arghakhanchi 1	Rewati Prasad Bhusal	Nepali Congress
Arghakhanchi 2	Dhundhi Raj Sharma	Nepali Congress
Nawalparasi 1	Surya Bhakta Adhikari	Nepali Congress
Nawalparasi 2	Majhi Lal Tharu Thanel	CPN (UML)
Nawalparasi 3	Hridayesh Tripathi	Nepal Sadbhawana Party
Nawalparasi 4	Triyugi Narayan Chaudhary	Nepal Sadbhawana Party
Rupandehi 1	Duryodhan Singh	Nepali Congress
Rupandehi 2	Ram Krishna Tamrakar	Nepali Congress
Rupandehi 3	Bal Krishna Khand	Nepali Congress
Rupandehi 4	Santa Prasad Chaudhary	Nepal Sadbhawana Party
Rupandehi 5	Shyam Sundar Gupta	Nepal Sadbhawana Party
Kapilvastu 1	Kamlesh Kumar Sharma	Nepali Congress
Kapilvastu 2	Dip Kumar Upadhaya	Nepali Congress
Kapilvastu 3	Bishnu Raj Acharya	Nepali Congress
Kapilvastu 4	Mirza Dilshad Beg	Nepal Sadbhawana Party
Mustang 1	Om Bikas Gauchan	CPN (UML)
Myagdi 1	Tham Maya Thapa	CPN (UML)
Myagdi 2	Chandra Prakash Baniya	CPN (UML)
Baglung 1	Govindra Prasad Sharma	Nepali Congress
Baglung 2	Min Bahadur Khatri	Nepali Congress
Baglung 3	Omkar Prasad Gauchan	Nepali Congress
Parbat 1	Krishna Prasad Bhattarai	CPN (UML)
Parbat 2	Uma Regmi	Nepali Congress
Rukum 1	Khadga Bahadur Budha	Samyukta Janamorcha
Rukum 2	Gopalji Jang Shahi	Nepali Congress
Rolpa 1	Barman Budha	Samyukta Janamorcha
Rolpa 2	Krishna Bahadur Mahara	Samyukta Janamorcha
Pyuthan 1	Shiva Raj Subedi	Nepali Congress
Pyuthan 2	Mukti Prasad Sharma	Nepali Congress
Salyan 1	Rajendra Bahadur Shah	Nepali Congress
Salyan 2	Chhabi Prasad Devkota	Nepali Congress
Dang Deukhuri 1	Hari Prasad Chaudhary	Nepali Congress
Dang Deukhuri 2	Shiva Raj Gautam	Nepali Congress
Dang Deukhuri 3	Khum Bahadur Khadka	Nepali Congress
Dolpa 1	Kyabu Budha	Nepali Congress
Mugu 1	Hasta Bahadur Malla	Nepali Congress
Jumla 1	Dilli Bahadur Mahat	Nepal Workers Peasants Party
Kalikot 1	Tilak Prasad Neupane	Nepali Congress
Humla 1	Chakka Bahadur Lama	Samyukta Janamorcha
Jajarkot 1	Dwarika Prasad Pradhan	Nepali Congress
Jajarkot 2	Krishna Bahadur Shahi	CPN (UML)
Dailekh 1	Ganesh Bahadur Khadka	Nepali Congress
Dailekh 2	Ranga Bahadur Shahi	Nepali Congress
Surkhet 1	Purna Bahadur Khadka	Nepali Congress
Surkhet 2	Shiv Raj Joshi	Nepali Congress
Banke 1	Syed Mairaj Ahmed Shah	Nepali Congress
Banke 2	Sushil Koirala	Nepali Congress
Banke 3	Krishna Singh Pariyar	Nepali Congress
Bardiya 1	Bam Dev Gautam	CPN (UML)
Bardiya 2	Khag Raj Sharma	CPN (UML)
Bardiya 3	Govinda Raj Gyawali	CPN (UML)
Bajura 1	Dev Raj Joshi	Nepali Congress
Bajhang 1	Arjun Jang Bahadur Singh	Nepali Congress
Bajhang 2	Lok Raj Joshi	Nepali Congress
Achham 1	Bal Bahadur Kunwar	Nepali Congress
Achham 2	Govinda Bahadur Shah	Nepali Congress
Achham 3	Ram Bahadur Bista	Nepali Congress
Doti 1	Bhakta Bahadur Balayar	Nepali Congress
Doti 2	Siddha Raj Ojha	Nepali Congress
Kailali 1	Ganga Bahadur Kunwar	Nepali Congress
Kailali 2	Ram Janam Chaudhary	Nepali Congress
Kailali 3	Tek Bahadur Chokhyal	Nepali Congress
Darchula 1	Dilendra Prasad Badu	Nepali Congress
Darchula 2	Ambar Bahadur Singh	Rastriya Prajatantra Party
Dadeldhura 1	Sher Bahadur Deuba	Nepali Congress
Baitadi 1	Krishna Kumar Joshi	Nepali Congress
Baitadi 2	Binayadhoj Chand	Nepali Congress
Baitadi 3	Narendra Bahadur Bum	Nepali Congress
Kanchanpur 1	Basu Dev Bhatta	Nepali Congress
Kanchanpur 2	Tarini Dutt Chataut	Nepali Congress

== By-elections ==
Constituency	Incumbent	Party	Cause of vacation	New MP	Party	By-election
Sunsari 3	Girija Prasad Koirala	Congress	Won from Morang 1	Prakash Koirala	Congress	1992
Kathmandu 5	Madan Bhandari	CPN (UML)	Won from Kathmandu 1	Krishna Gopal Shrestha	CPN (UML)	1992
Kathmandu 1	Madan Bhandari	CPN (UML)	Death	Bidya Devi Bhandari	CPN (UML)	1994
Jhapa 1	Drona Prasad Acharya	CPN (UML)	Death	Krishna Prasad Sitaula	Congress	1994

== Changes and defections ==
Constituency	Name	From	To	Date	Reference
Baglung 3	Omkar Prasad Gauchan	Independent	Congress	19 June 1991	
Rautahat 3	Govinda Chaudhary	Independent	Congress	20 June 1991	
Siraha 4	Raj Dev Gohit	Independent	Congress	20 June 1991	
Darchula 2	Ambar Bahadur Singh	RPP (Thapa)	RPP		
Sindhupalchok 3	Pashupati S.J.B Rana	RPP (Chand)	RPP		
Nuwakot 1	Prakash Chandra Lohani	RPP (Chand)	RPP		
Rasuwa 1	Ram Krishna Udpadhyaya	RPP (Chand)	RPP		
