= Bhanu Bhakta Dhakal =

Nepali politician

Honourable Bhanu Bhakta Dhakal
- भानु भक्त ढकाल

Minister of Culture, Tourism and Civil Aviation
- In office 25 December 2020 – 4 June 2021
- President: Bidhya Devi Bhandari
- Prime Minister: KP Sharma Oli
- Preceded by: Yogesh Bhattarai
- Succeeded by: Uma Shankar Aragriya

Ministry of Health and Population
- In office November 20, 2019 – 25 December 2020
- President: Bidhya Devi Bhandari
- Prime Minister: KP Sharma Oli
- Preceded by: Upendra Yadav

Minister of Law, Justice and Parliamentary Affairs
- In office 3 August 2018 – 20 November 2019
- President: Bidhya Devi Bhandari
- Prime Minister: KP Sharma Oli
- Preceded by: Sher Bahadur Tamang

Member of Parliament, Pratinidhi Sabha
- In office 4 March 2018 – 18 September 2022
- Preceded by: Dilip Khawas Gachhadar
- Constituency: Morang 3

Member of Constituent Assembly for CPN (UML) party list
- In office 21 January 2014 – 14 October 2017

Personal details
- Born: 4 January 1962 (age 64) Okhre-1, Tehrathum, Nepal
- Party: CPN (UML)
- Website: Official website

Bhanu Bhakta Dhakal is a Nepalese Politician and serving as the Member of House Of Representatives (Nepal) elected from Morang constituency-3, Province No. 1. He is the member and lawmaker of the Presidium of Nepal Communist Party. He is former Minister for Health and Population and currently Minister of Culture, Tourism and Civil Aviation of Nepal Government. He is accused of allegedly embezzling state fund in the procurement of medical equipment amid the government’s battle against the outbreak of COVID-19
