= Sher Bahadur Tamang =

Nepalese politician

- शेरबहादुर तामाङ

Minister of Health and Population
- In office 4 June 2021 – 22 June 2021
- President: Bidya Devi Bhandari
- Prime Minister: KP Sharma Oli
- Preceded by: Bhanu Bhakta Dhakal

Minister of Law, Justice and Parliamentary Affairs
- In office 16 March 2018 – 24 July 2018
- President: Bidya Devi Bhandari
- Prime Minister: KP Sharma Oli

Member of Parliament, Pratinidhi Sabha
- In office 4 March 2018 – 18 September 2022
- Preceded by: Agni Prasad Sapkota
- Constituency: Sindhupalchok 2

Member of Constituent Assembly
- In office 21 January 2014 – 14 October 2017
- Preceded by: Dawa Tama
- Succeeded by: Constituency abolished
- Constituency: Sindhupalchok 3

Personal details
- Born: 28 March 1969 (age 57)
- Party: CPN UML
- Spouse: Usha Kala Rai

Sher Bahadur Tamang (Nepali: शेर बहादुर तामाङ) is a Nepalese politician and was Minister of Health and Population of Government of Nepal. He also served as a Minister of Law, Justice and Parliamentary Affairs under First Oli cabinet. He is a member of the Federal Parliament of Nepal. He won the Sindhupalchowk–2 seat in Nepalese legislative elections of 2017 as part of the Communist Party of Nepal (Unified Marxist–Leninist).

In July 2018, Tamang gave a controversial remark about female Nepali students studying for their MBBS in Bangladesh, stating they were "bound to compromise their honour to claim their certificates." He publicly apologized, but after facing pressure from his party, resigned from his post.

== Political appointments and elections ==
In 2040 BS, Tamang became the District Committee Chairperson of ANNFSU, a student organization of CPN UML. In 2054 BS, he became the District Committee Secretary of CPN UML, and in 2059 BS, he was a member of Bagmati Zonal of CPN UML. He was elected as a member of the Constituent Assembly from Sindhupalchowk-3 in 2nd Nepalese Constituent Assembly and elected as a member of the House of Representatives from Sindhupalchok-2 in 2074 BS.

== See also ==
- Ministry of Health and Population (Nepal)
