= National Lake Conservation Development Committee =

National Lake Conservation Development Committee (NLCDC) is government body of Nepal who is responsible for the development of lakes, pond and daha under Ministry of Culture, Tourism and Civil Aviation (Nepal).

== Objectives ==
This Committee has following multiple objectives:

- Formulating appropriate policy measures for the conservation and development of lakes
- Planning and implementing lake programs in coordination with concerned ministries, development and other stakeholders.
- Developing lakes as the recreational and tourist destination points
- Identifying and publicizing lakes of religious and cultural importance
- Maintaining and upgrading Lake Database, inventory conduct lake researches and develop and disseminate lake awareness materials.
- Resolving lake encroachment issues
- Mitigating lake pollution
- Developing and implementing overall lake development schemes benefiting to communities and stakeholders
- Involving local stakeholders in lake management; preventing all activities that negatively affect lake environment, biodiversity and beauty; and
- Coordinating national and international organization as per the need of conservation and development of lakes

== See also ==
- List of lakes of Nepal
