= Bimala B.K. =

Nepali lawmaker

- बिमला वि.क.

State Minister of Minister of Industry, Commerce and Supplies
- Incumbent
- Assumed office 25 December 2020
- President: Bidya Devi Bhandari
- Prime Minister: KP Oli

Member of Parliament, Pratinidhi Sabha for CPN (UML) party list
- In office 4 March 2018 – 18 September 2022

Personal details
- Born: 8 January 1986 (age 40) Bardiya District
- Party: CPN (UML)

Bimala B.K. is a Nepali politician, cabinet member and a member of the House of Representatives. She was elected under the proportional representation system from CPN UML, filling the reservation seat for Dalits as well as women. She is State Minister of Minister of Industry, Commerce and Supplies.
