= Ambika Sanwa =

Nepali politician

Ambika Sanba(अथक योद्धा )
- In office 1991–1999
- Monarch: King Birendra Bir Bikram Shah
- Prime Minister: Girja Prasad Koirala

Minister for Environment And Population(1998)

Member of Parliament (Year 1991-1994,1994-1999)

Personal details
- Party: Communist Party of Nepal (Unified Marxist–Leninist) (–2004); Communist Party of Nepal (Maoist Centre) (2005–)
- Spouse: Jasmaya Sanba Thamsuhang
- Children: Keshav Sanba, Chandra Sanba, Padma Sanba, Nirupa Sanba, Kabita Sanba, Kalpana Sanba , Indrakala Sanba, Sapana Sanba

Ambika Sanba was born on March 17, 1937 in Khokling, Mikwakhola, Taplejung District. He was a Nepalese politician. He was elected to the Pratinidhi Sabha for two terms in 1991 and 1994election, as the Communist Party of Nepal (Unified Marxist-Leninist) candidate in the Taplejung-2 constituency for 8years.

After the election Sanba was named Minister for Population and Environment after split of CPN (UML) and CPN (ML) in 1999 ,cabinet of Girja Prasad Koirala.

In August 2005, after having been missing for seven months, Sanba's family notified the press that he had joined the underground Communist Party of Nepal (Maoist Centre).

.
