= Bhojraj Joshi =

Nepalese politician

Personal details
- Party: CPN (UML)

Bhojraj Joshi is a Nepalese politician, belonging to the Communist Party of Nepal (Unified Marxist-Leninist). He was elected to the Pratinidhi Sabha in the 1994 election. In 1997 he was named Minister of Education in the cabinet of Lokendra Bahadur Chand.

In 2005 he was arrested during pro-democracy protests.
