= Chin Kaji Shrestha =

Nepali politician

Chin Kaji Shrestha (Nepali: चिनकाजी श्रेष्ठ) is a Nepalese parliamentary Chief Whip of the Nepali Congress as of March 18, 2014. He was nominated for the post by the Nepalese Prime Minister, Sushil Koirala. Prior to becoming the country's whip, he was its Chief Secretary for a while. In 2014 he proposed to investigate the apparent "vote rigging" allegations which was reported by such politicians as Bal Bahadur, Kamal Prasad Pangeni, Rekha Sharma, Ram Narayan Bidari, Laxman Lal Karna, and both Bhim Bahadur Rawal and Bhanubhakta Dhakal of the UML Party.
