= Ministry of Population and Environment =

Government ministry of Nepal

Agency overview
- Dissolved: February 23, 2018
- Headquarters: Singha Durbar
- Minister responsible: Lal Babu Pandit, Honourable
- Child agencies: Department of Environment; Department of Hydrology and Meteorology
- Website: www.mope.gov.np/ne/

The Ministry of Population and Environment (Nepali: जनसंख्या तथा वातावरण मन्त्रालय) was the governmental body of Nepal tasked with implementing population and environment policies, plans and programmes. It was superseded by the Ministry of Health and Population in 2018.
