= Jagannath Acharya =

Nepali politician

Personal details
- Party: Nepali Congress

Jagannath Acharya was a Nepalese freedom fighter and politician. His affiliated political party was Nepali Congress. Born in 1981 11th Baisakh at Kaushaltar of Bhaktapur District, Acharya, a Nepali Congress leader, played an important role in the democratic movement of 2007 and the first People's Movement of 1990. Leaders B.P. Koirala, Ganesh Man Singh, Krishna Prasad Bhattarai and Subarna Sumsher Rana appreciated late Acharya for his role in the democratic movement of Nepal. Senior politician Acharya was imprisoned by Ranas and his struggle continued after the overthrow of democracy in 1960 by King Mahendra.
