= Balaram Gharti Magar =

Nepali politician (1937–2025)

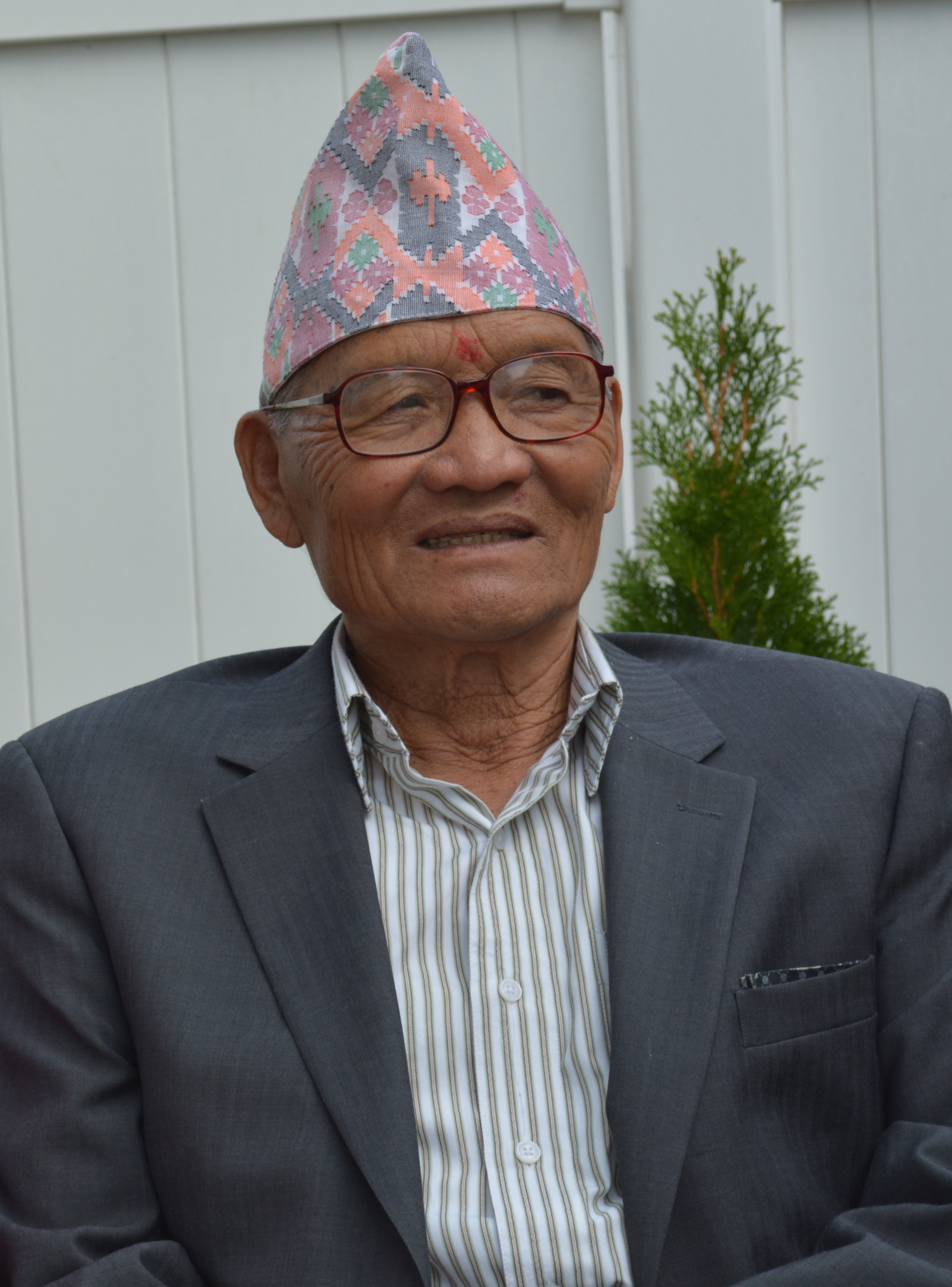
- Magar in 2015
- Born: 2 August 1937; Upallothar Mukhyadera, Rolpa district, Nepal
- Died: 11 July 2025 (aged 87); Lalitpur, Nepal
- Political party: Rastriya Prajatantra Party

Balaram Gharti Magar (2 August 1937 – 11 July 2025) was a Nepali politician. He became minister 11 times, during the Panchayat System, and after the declaration of multi-party system. Roughly, he remained in different governments as a minister for about 30 years. He was a Central Committee Member, Senior Member, of the Rastriya Prajatantra Party (RPP). He still actively took part in his party activities until his death. He visited his birthplace, Rolpa, and Rolpali people from time to time.

== Family ==
Magar was born at Mijhing VDC, Ward No 5, Upallothar Mukhyadera, Rolpa District in Nepal on 18 Shravan 1994 BS (2 August 1937). His parents were Nar Bahadur Gharti Magar and Tika Kumari Gharti Magar. He had two brothers and a younger sister. He later studied Politics and Law in Kanpur, India.

== Early politics ==
In 2017 BS, he went to Kanpur where he spent a year. He was influenced by political activities there. Although political activities in Nepal were banned, in India it was free to open different unions. Every day after hearing the speeches from the Union leaders there, he learnt the methods of conducting speeches and dealing with the political masses. He returned to Rolpa in 2018 BS and met resident of Gajul VDC, Khadananda Subedi. He was Nepali Congress party leader of Rolpa and was Member of Parliament (MP) during the Nepali Congress-led Government. Subedi advised him to take active participation in politics. Gharti Magar was influenced by Nepali Congress party during that time.

== Later politics ==
During the election of Pradhanpancha, he was elected as a Pradhanpancha of his village in 2018 BS. He was 24 years old when he became Pradhanpancha for the first time. The next year, there was District Panchayat's election, he got elected as a deputy chairman of District Panchayat. National Panchayat Member (NPM) election was held in the same year and he was elected without any opposition. In Baishakh 2020 BS, meeting of National Panchayat was held formally. One of his well wishers, knowing he was so young, had suggested he not be a minister because that post would have destroyed him. He was only 25 years of age at that time. The third election was held in Chaitra 2030 BS and he was reelected in NPM and in the meantime, he became Assistant Minister of Home Affairs for the first time. He was 37 years old at that time. Later he became Defence State Minister. After one year, he became Construction and Transport State Minister in 2035 BS under the premiership of Dr Tulsi Giri. In 2034 BS, when Kirti Nidhi Bista became Prime Minister (PM), he became Construction and Transport Minister. Later when Surya Bahadur Thapa became PM, he became Defence Minister. There was another election in 2038 BS, he was again reelected with a huge majority of votes, with about 28,000. After becoming Defence Minister for one year, he became Local Development Minister. After one year, he became Industry Minister. Meantime, he became Health Minister too. In 2040 BS, he remained only NPM during the premiership of Lokendra Bahadur Chand. There was another election during 2043 BS, he was reelected in NPM.

After the multiparty democracy in Nepal, in 2051BS, he was elected as Member of Parliament (MP) from RPP. When Surya Bahadur Thapa became PM, he was appointed Construction and Transport Minister. Later when Sher Bahadur Deuba became PM, he became Housing and Physical Planning Minister. Later again when Sher Bahadur Deuba became PM, he became Science and Technology Minister for the last time.

== Death ==
Magar died in Lalitpur on 11 July 2025, at the age of 87.

== Works ==
Magar published five books: Mool, Rajyog Sadhana Sutra, Yesterday, Today and Tomorrow, Sandhi Patra Grantha, and Yogi Narharinath Sangraha. He published his autobiography "Aitihasik Ghatanakram Part 1" in which he compiled his experience in Nepalese politics.

== Awards ==
Magar was awarded Gorkha Dakshin Bahu First and Second Class, Trishakti Patta Second Class, Shubharajyavishek Padak, Birendra Aishwarya Sewa Padak, Sewa Padak, and Coronation Medal.

== See also ==
- Magar people
