= Suresh Chandra Das =

Nepalese politician

- सुरेस चन्द्र दास

Member of Parliament, Pratinidhi Sabha
- Incumbent
- Assumed office 4 March 2018
- Preceded by: Ram Chandra Yadav
- Constituency: Siraha 2
- In office May 1991 – May 1999
- Preceded by: Constituency established
- Succeeded by: Krishna Charan Shrestha
- Constituency: Siraha 3

Personal details
- Born: 10 May 1956 (age 69)
- Party: Nepali Congress
- Other political affiliations: CPN (Maoist Centre) (2017-2022)

Suresh Chandra Das is a Nepalese politician, belonging to the Nepali Congress currently serving as the member of the 1st Federal Parliament of Nepal. In the 2017 Nepalese general election he was elected from the Siraha 2 constituency, securing 20148 (35.49%) votes.

== Electoral history ==
=== 2017 legislative elections ===
Party	Candidate	Votes
CPN (Maoist Centre)	Sures Chandra Das	20,148
Federal Socialist Forum, Nepal	Shatrudhan Prasad Singh	17,260
Nepali Congress	Ram Chandra Yadav	15,597
CPN (Marxist–Leninist)	Durga Prasad Lamsal	1,777
Others		1,985
Invalid votes		4,768
Result	Congress hold	
Source: Election Commission

=== 1999 legislative elections ===
Party	Candidate	Votes
Rastriya Prajatantra Party	Krishna Charan Shrestha	14,396
Nepali Congress	Surendra Kumar Das	12,751
Samyukta Janamorcha Nepal	Ram Rijan Yadav	9,539
CPN (Unified Marxist–Leninist)	Jaya Chimire	9,012
Others		1,687
Invalid Votes		2,171
Result	RPP gain	
Source: Election Commission

=== 1994 legislative elections ===
Party	Candidate	Votes
Nepali Congress	Suresh Chandra Das	14,357
Rastriya Prajatantra Party	Krishna Charan Shrestha	9,352
CPN (Unified Marxist–Leninist)	Dharma Nath Yadav	7,597
Samyukta Janamorcha Nepal	Bishwanath Shah	4,861
CPN (United)	Ashok Kumar Singh	3,004
Nepal Sadbhawana Party	Bhogendra Thakur	1,812
Others		1,049
Result	Congress hold	
Source: Election Commission

=== 1991 legislative elections ===
Party	Candidate	Votes
Nepali Congress	Suresh Chandra Das	12,485
CPN (Unified Marxist–Leninist)	Dharma Nath Yadav	7,613
Result	Congress gain	
