= Ministry of Labour, Employment and Social Security (Nepal) =

Defunt government ministry of Nepal

- श्रम, रोजगार तथा सामाजिक सुरक्षा मन्त्रालय
- Emblem of Nepal

Agency overview
- Formed: 1981
- Dissolved: 13 May 2026
- Superseding agency: Ministry of Youth, Labour and Employment
- Jurisdiction: Government of Nepal
- Headquarters: Singha Durbar, Kathmandu, Nepal
- Minister responsible: Ramjee Yadav (last holder)
- Website: moless.gov.np

The Ministry of Labour, Employment and Social Security (Nepali: श्रम, रोजगार तथा सामाजिक सुरक्षा मन्त्रालय) was a government ministry of Nepal that governed the development policies of labour and employment in the country.

== History ==
The ministry was formed in 1981 as the Ministry of Labour and Social Welfare.In 1995 and 2000, the portfolio was adjusted making it first the Ministry of Labour and later the Ministry of Labour and Transport Management. In 2002, the ministry was restructured resulting in a new name: Ministry of Labour and Employment.

In 2018, under the Second Oli cabinet, the portfolio was again adjusted twice: First, it was renamed as the Ministry of Labor, Employment, Women and Senior Citizens but in March 2018, the ministry was again divided to create both, the Ministry of Labor and Employment and the Ministry of Women, Children and Senior Citizen.

The ministry was dissolved in 2026 by the Balen Shah cabinet. Its responsibilities were divided between the newly formed Ministry of Women, Children, Gender and Sexual Minorities and Social Security and the Ministry of Youth, Labour and Employment, with social security functions transferred to the former and labour and employment functions transferred to the latter.

== Objectives ==
The jurisdiction of the ministry as per Government of Nepal (Division of Labor) Rules, 2074, the scope of work of this Ministry is as follows.

- Labor and employment policies, laws, standards, and regulations,
- Foreign Employment Policy, Law, Standards, Management, and Regulation,
- Policies, Laws, Standards, and Regulations on Social Security and Social Security Fund Operations for Workers,
- Industrial dispute resolution,
- Commission on Labor and Occupational Health Security Inspection and Labor Relations,
- Employment-oriented, skill and vocational training policy,
- Unified trade union laws and regulations,
- Policies and laws related to the prevention of child labor,
- Occupational health and safety policies, laws and standards,
- Labor permit to foreign worke,
- Labor companion,
- Integrated data management, study, and research on unemployment,
- Treaties, agreements, conventions, liaison, and coordination with national and international organizations related to the ministry,
- Operation and regulation of public institutions, authorities, committees, establishments, companies, etc. related to the Ministry.

== Organisational structure ==
Two departments serve under the ministry to facilitate and implement its work:

- Department of Labour & Occupational Safety
- Department of Foreign Employment

Furthermore, several Organizations also work under and with the ministry:

- Foreign Employment Board
- National Academy foe Vocational Training
