= Bal Bahadur Rai =

Nepalese politician

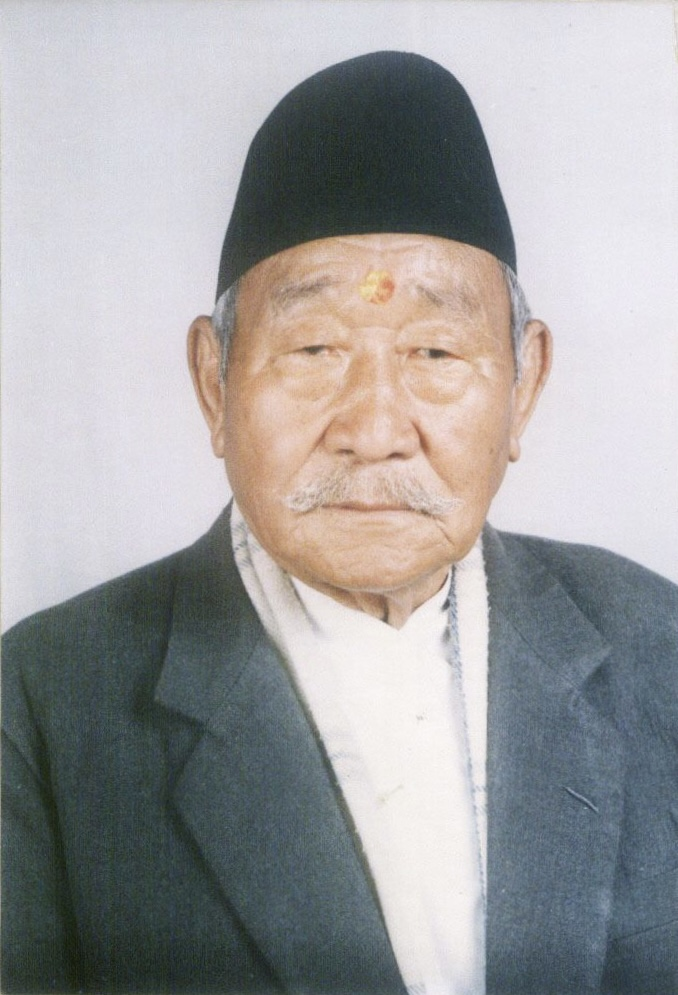
- Born: 17 February 1921; Maula, Okhaldhunga
- Died: 4 July 2010 (aged 89); Kathmandu, Nepal
- Occupation: Political leader
- Known for: 19 times acting prime minister of Nepal.

Bal Bahadur Rai (बल बहादुर राई) (1921-2010) was the leader of the Nepali Congress political party and a former cabinet minister in the Government of Nepal. He actively participated in major democratic movements in Nepal’s history. He became politically active in 1947. He served as acting Prime Minister of Nepal 19 times.

== Death ==
Rai died at the age of 90 in Kathmandu.
