= Khum Bahadur Khadka =

Nepali politician

Personal details
- Party: Nepali Congress

Khum Bahadur Khadka (Nepali: खुम बहादुर खड्का) (1951–2018) was a Nepali politician who was an elected member in Nepali Congress Central Working Committee. He was a Minister of the Interior of Nepal and one of the most influential leaders of Nepali Congress Party.
