= Ministry of General Administration =

Former Nepalese ministry

Ministry of General Administration (Nepali: सामान्य प्रशासन मन्त्रालय) is a former Ministry of Government of Nepal to regulate and manage the civil service as prescribed governments rules and regulations in the country. In February 2018, this ministry was merged with the Ministry of Federal Affairs and named the Ministry of Federal Affairs and General Administration.

Emblem of Nepal
