= Mirza Dilshad Beg =

Nepali politician

- مرزا دلشاد بیگ

Personal details
- Died: June 29, 1998 Kathmandu, Nepal
- Manner of death: Assassination
- Party: Rastriya Prajatantra Party

Mirza Dilshad Beg (died June 29, 1998) was an assassinated Indian-Nepali parliamentarian. He had links with Dawood Ibrahim's D-company, a criminal syndicate. He was shot dead in Siphal, Kathmandu in Nepal.

== Background ==
Hailing from Deoria near Gorakhpur, Uttar Pradesh, Mirza began his forays into the underworld around late eighties. He grew in notoriety through car thefts, assault, kidnapping and of course murders; he later thought of his antecedents as petty crimes.

== Involvement with the underworld ==
Mirza's graduation to the big league began after a chance meeting with Dawood Ibrahim in Mumbai in the early eighties, when both were struggling to carve a niche for themselves in India. Besides Dawood, Mirza also had links with Chhota Rajan, Chhota Shakeel, the brothers Amar and Ashwin Naik and members of the Pathan syndicate. However, he shot to prominence only after his association with Pakistan's Inter-Services Intelligence operatives in India and Nepal.

The porous Indo-Nepal border helped him sneak in and out of his home state and into Nepal. From then on, his notoriety grew so much that the UP police announced a reward for his arrest.

== Political career in Nepal ==
Beg, the elusive crook found Kathmandu safer than UP. Dawood's reputation of transforming crooks into kings in India also helped him in Nepal. Playing the communal card in the election, Mirza represented the Muslim minority in Hindu-majority Nepal and won with a thumping majority. Beg had been elected to the House of Representatives in Kapilvastu District in 1994 and held ministerial portfolios in two governments.

He resigned from the Nepal Sadbhawana Party, and joined the Rashtriya Prajatantra Party, winning two consecutive terms from the Kapilavastu constituency in south-west Nepal. Finally, his shady past became his nemesis and began to erode his popularity as a politician. Mumbai's Crime Branch officers believed that Mirza regularly used his Krishna Nagar mansion to shelter gangsters on the run from Indian enforcement agencies.

His residence was also used for other illegal activities including confinement of abductees, drug-trafficking, gun-running and forging of documents.

He was so effective that Dawood, whose reach had spread from Dubai to Karachi and Colombo to London, regarded Kathmandu as his strongest base. In fact the mafia don even considered shifting to Kathmandu for a while, following the Gulshan Kumar murder. The Indian government had tried to extradite his lieutenant Abu Salem for the murder and had turned the heat on the UAE government to secure Salem's custody. However, it was Mirza's declining clout which forced him to change his mind, making him opt for the ISI sanctuary in Karachi.

Mirza's greed turned him towards gun-running, smuggling arms procured from the Afghan Mujahedins and the ISI, into India.

Mirza's exploits allegedly include an aborted bid on the life of UP Chief Minister Kalyan Singh in Nainital. Mirza's murder had also stunned the Mumbai underworld as most fugitives had, at some point in time, used Mirza's good offices for passage out of the country.

== Death ==
Mirza Dilshad Beg was shot dead on June 29, 1998, around 9:30 pm as he was on his way to visit his second wife in Siphal, Kathmandu, Chabahil area. As he climbed from his car and was walking towards the residence, killers gunned him down. His driver, who was parking the car, was also killed. In an interview published in the Indian newsmagazine India Today, Rajendra Sadashiv Nikhalje, alias Chhota Rajan, took the responsibility of killing Mirza Beg and alleged that "through the ISI, he (Beg) was spreading terror in India".

== Murder theories ==
The intelligence reports available with the Indian Authorities, list three reasons why Beg was being targeted. Firstly, while Beg had initially helped Babloo Srivastava obtain a Nepalese passport, he did not come to his rescue when he was eventually arrested in Singapore in 1995. Babloo Srivastava's Nepalese citizenship was cancelled and he was handed over to the Indian authorities.

Secondly, following Gulshan Kumar's killing in Mumbai, the main hit-man Vikram Wahi—a close associate of Babloo Srivastava—had absconded to Kathmandu and his local hideout was raided by the Nepal police. Even as the modalities for Wahi's surrender were being worked out, his dead body—hacked into pieces—was recovered at the Indo-Nepal border near Krishnanagar. Besides Babloo Srivastava, Wahi's associates including Karan Singh Magga—who was to eventually gun down Beg on 29 June 1998 along with underworld don Chhota Rajan's associate, Rohit Verma—harbored a grudge against him.

The third angle to the Nepal MP's killing, the intelligence report states, related to Shafi Mohammad Khan of Krishnanagar who was arrested in a narcotics case by the Nepal Police in Mumbai. Like Babloo Srivastava, he too was of the view that Mirza had made no efforts to secure his release after arrest nor was he extended sufficient help during his trial.

This, along with the internecine gang wars between Chota Rajan and Dawood Ibrahim were the main reasons for Mirza's murder. Chhota Rajan is believed to have contacted Rohit Verma in Nepal to organise the killing and advised him not to strike in Kathmandu. Babloo Srivastava then contacted Shafi Mohammad and gave him some money to arrange for a safe house in Kathmandu. Despite taking the money, Shafi was not able to find the place. The gang made its first attempt on Beg on 27 June 1998 and finally succeeded two days later when the MP was shot six or seven times before he finally collapsed at around 9:30 pm, at the time of Football World Cup. This ended a bloody chapter of the Mumbai mafia's free run in the Himalayan kingdom.

In an interview to MiD DAY, Farid Tanasha, a key lieutenant of Chhota Rajan, admitted to being one of the main architects of the murder of Nepal's member of Parliament, Mirza Dilshad Baig who was killed in Kathmandu in 1998.
