= Ministry of Home Affairs (Nepal) =

Government ministry of Nepal

- गृह मन्त्रालय
- Emblem of Nepal

Agency overview
- Jurisdiction: Government of Nepal
- Headquarters: Singha Durbar, Kathmandu
- Motto: Peace and security in the nation and homely services to citizen
- Minister responsible: Sudan Gurung, Cabinet Minister
- Agency executive: Rameshwar Dangal, Home Secretary
- Website: www.moha.gov.np

The Ministry of Home Affairs in Nepal (Nepali: गृह मन्त्रालय, romanized: Gr̥ha mantrālaya) is the governmental body of Nepal mainly responsible for delivering critical services to the citizens, and maintaining security in the nation.

== Background ==
After the political changes in Nepal in 2007 BS, the Ministry of Home Affairs was established in 2008 BS (1951 AD).

After the change in 2017 BS (1960 AD), the name of the Ministry of Home Affairs was changed to the Ministry of Home Panchayat, and Nepal was divided into 14 zones and 75 districts with the arrangement of Zonal Governor and Chief District Officer. After the commencement of the Local Administration Act, 2028 BS, the duties and rights of the zonal magistrates and PGAs were legally regulated. After the formation of the Ministry of Local Development in 2037 BS, the main task of the Ministry of Home Affairs was to maintain law and order and local administration. In the Constitution of Nepal 2072 BS, 77 districts were established and there are 77 district administration offices under the Ministry. Maintaining peace, order and security in the country and protecting the livelihood and freedom of the people are the main objectives of the Home Administration. The Home Administration needs to be strong and capable, to give a sense of security to the people and to make the service flow effective and maintain good governance.

== Organisational structure ==
The Ministry of Home Affairs consists of the following eight departments:

1. Department of Immigration (website)
2. Department of National ID and Civil Registration (website)
3. Nepal Police (website)
4. Armed Police Force, Nepal (website)
5. Department of Prison Management (website)
6. National Disaster Risk Reduction and Management Authority (website)
7. Department of Criminal Assets Management
8. Improper Transactions (Meter Interest) Investigation Commission, 2079 (website)
