= Bidya Devi Bhandari =

President of Nepal from 2015 to 2023

- विद्यादेवी भण्डारी
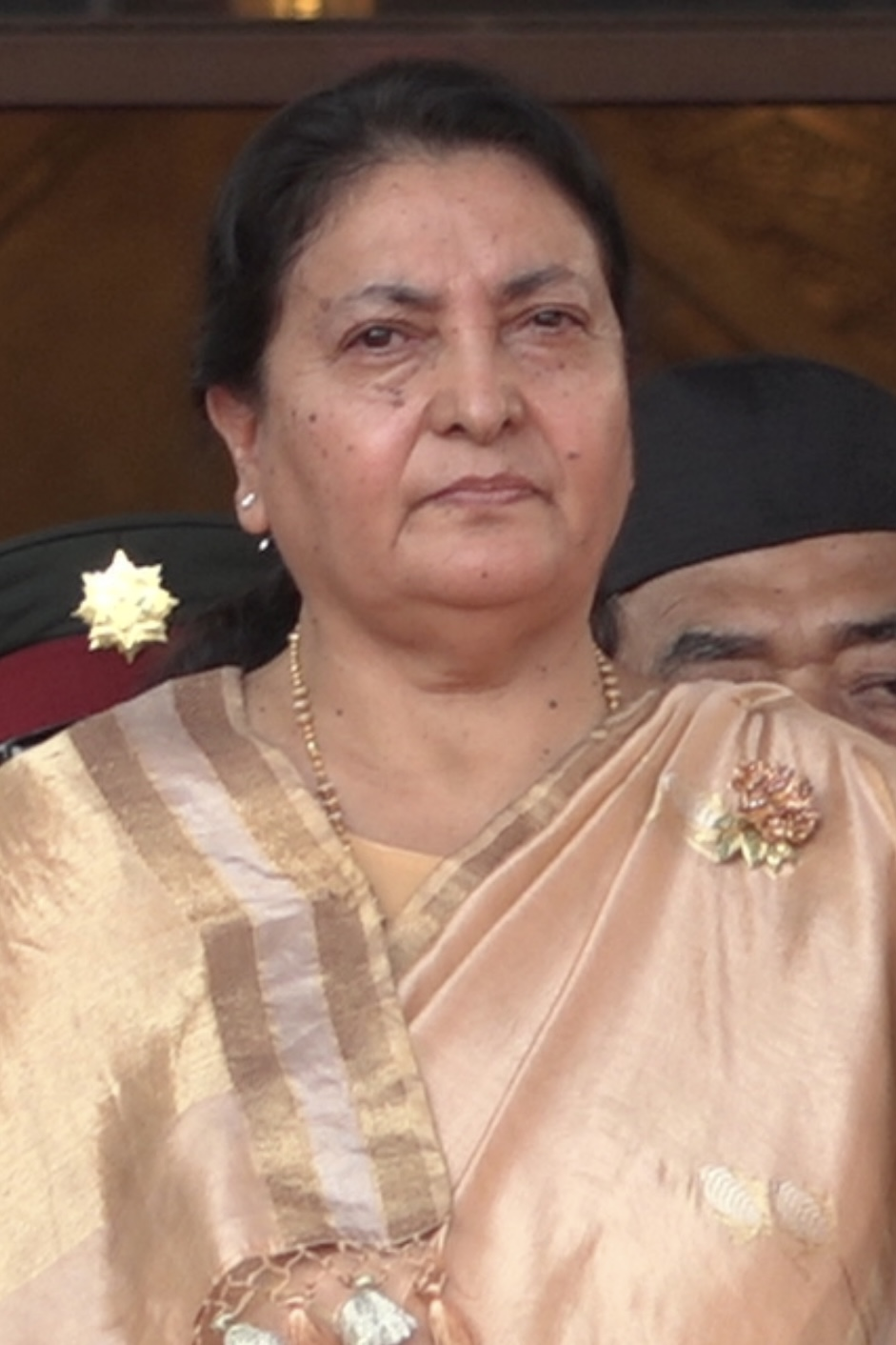
- Bhandari in 2023

President of Nepal
- In office 29 October 2015 – 13 March 2023
- Prime Minister: K. P. Sharma Oli; Sher Bahadur Deuba; Pushpa Kamal Dahal
- Vice President: Parmanand Jha; Nanda Kishor Pun
- Preceded by: Ram Baran Yadav
- Succeeded by: Ram Chandra Paudel

Minister of Defence
- In office 25 May 2009 – 6 February 2011
- President: Ram Baran Yadav
- Prime Minister: Madhav Kumar Nepal
- Preceded by: Ram Bahadur Thapa
- Succeeded by: Bijay Kumar Gachhadar

Minister of Population and Environment
- In office 25 March 1997 – 7 October 1997
- Monarch: Birendra
- Prime Minister: Lokendra Bahadur Chand
- Preceded by: Prakash Man Singh
- Succeeded by: Prakash Man Singh

Member of the House of Representatives
- In office November 1994 – April 2008
- Preceded by: Daman Nath Dhungana
- Succeeded by: Jhakku Prasad Subedi
- Constituency: Kathmandu 2
- In office January 1994 – August 1994
- Preceded by: Madan Bhandari
- Succeeded by: Man Mohan Adhikari
- Constituency: Kathmandu 1

Member of the Constituent Assembly / Legislature Parliament
- In office 21 January 2014 – 28 October 2015

Personal details
- Born: Bidya Pandey; 19 June 1961 (age 65) Mane Bhanjyang, Bhojpur, Nepal
- Party: Communist Party of Nepal (Unified Marxist–Leninist) (until 2015)
- Spouse: Madan Bhandari (m. 1982; died 1993)
- Children: 2
- Parent(s): Ram Bahadur Pandey (father); Mithila Pandey (mother)
- Education: Bidhdhodaya Higher Secondary School, Bhojpur
- Alma mater: Tribhuvan University (BA)
- Website: bidyabhandari.com.np

Bidya Devi Bhandari (Nepali: विद्यादेवी भण्डारी; born 19 June 1961) is a Nepali former politician who served as the second president of Nepal from 2015 to 2023. She formerly served as the minister of defence and minister of environment and population.

She is the first woman to hold the presidential office in the country. She served as the vice-chairperson of the Communist Party of Nepal (Unified Marxist–Leninist) and was the chair of the All Nepal Women's Association before being elected president. Bhandari previously served as the Minister of Defence, the first woman to hold the office, from 2009 to 2011. She also served as the Minister of Environment and Population in 1997, and has been an active campaigner for environmental awareness and women's rights in Nepal. In June 2017, she visited the headquarters of the International Union for Conservation of Nature in Gland, Switzerland and met with the director general Inger Andersen to discuss enhanced collaboration on nature conservation and sustainable development. In 2016, Forbes placed her at number 52 on its list of the world's 100 most powerful women.

== Early life ==
Bhandari was born on 19 June 1961 in Mane Bhanjyang, Bhojpur, to Ram Bahadur Pandey and Mithila Pandey. She completed her school level education in Bhojpur and pursued her higher education in Biratnagar, Morang. Her political career began with membership of a leftist student union. She joined the Communist Party of Nepal (Marxist–Leninist) in 1980.

== Political career ==
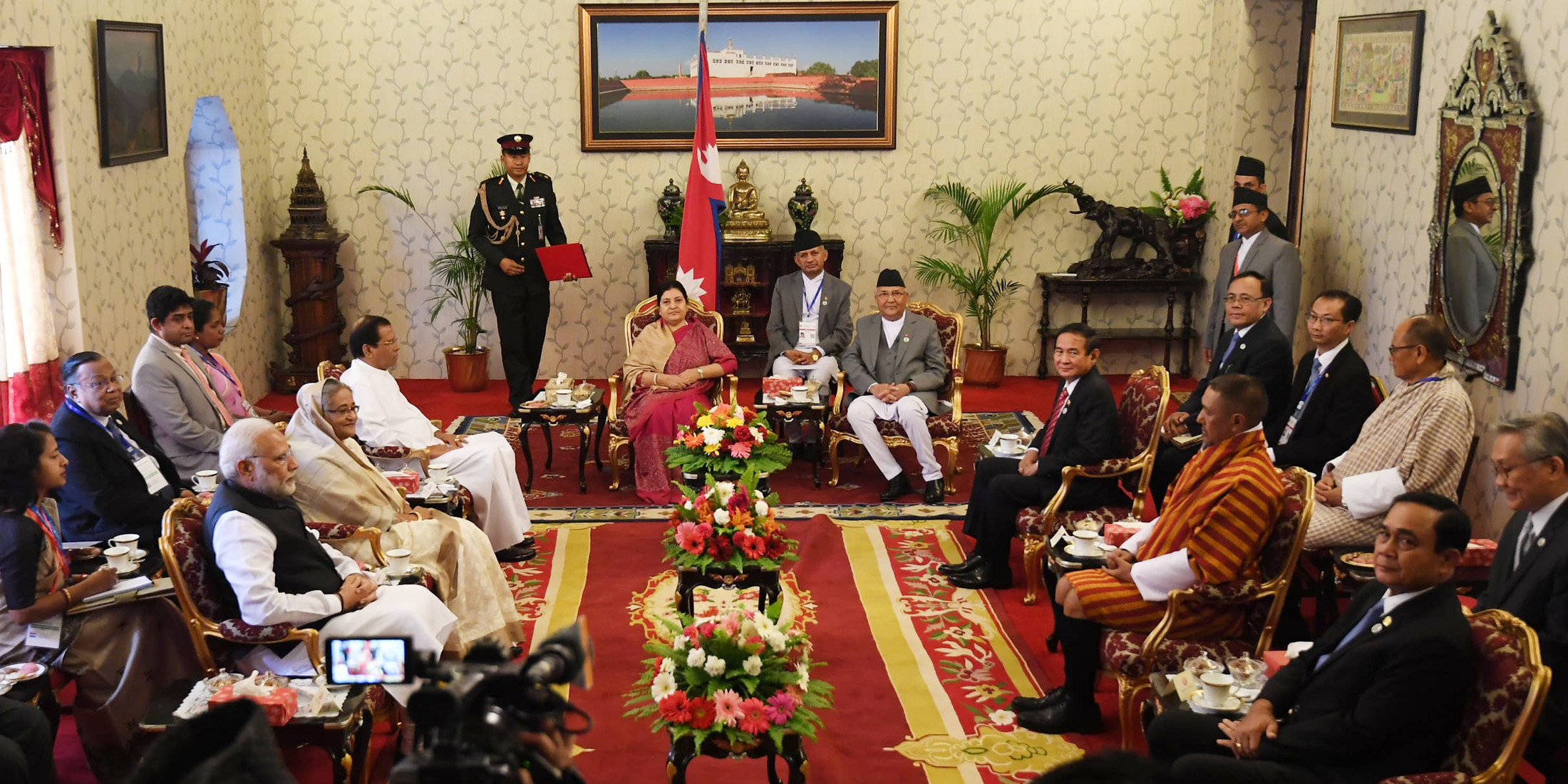
Meeting with the BIMSTEC leaders in Kathmandu, Nepal on August 30, 2018

Bhandari was active in politics from an early age. According to the details provided by the CPN (UML), Bhandari joined politics as an activist of the Youth League of CPN (ML) in 1978, from Bhojpur. She played a role as an in-charge for Eastern Zone Committee of ANNFSU from 1979 to 1987. Her active political journey, however, started when she received party membership from the CPN (ML) in 1980. After completing her school level study, Bhandari was enrolled in Mahendra Morang Adarsha Multiple Campus where she was elected treasurer of the students' union. Also, she played a pivotal role as chairperson of the women's wing of GEFONT from 1993 until being elected a central committee member of the CPN (UML) in 1997.

Bhandari was first elected to the parliament in a by-election in January 1994, caused by the death of her husband, the sitting member from Kathmandu–1, where she defeated former prime minister Krishna Prasad Bhattarai. In the 1994 general election, she was elected from Kathmandu–2, defeating house speaker Daman Nath Dhungana. She served as the Minister for Environment and Population in a coalition government led by prime minister Lokendra Bahadur Chand in 1997. She was re-elected from Kathmandu–2 in the 1999 general election. However, she was defeated in the 2008 Constituent Assembly poll, and was later nominated under the proportional electoral system. She served as the Minister of Defence in the cabinet of prime minister Madhav Kumar Nepal. She was re-elected under the proportional electoral system in the 2013 elections. Her influence in the party remained dominant when she was elected as vice-chairperson of the CPN (UML) in its eighth general convention held in Butwal. Bhandari, who was re-elected vice-chairperson in the party's next general convention, is considered a close confidante to party chairman and prime minister KP Sharma Oli.

After the promulgation of the new constitution in 2015, Bhandari was elected president by an indirect election held in the parliament on 28 October 2015. She defeated Nepali Congress' Kul Bahadur Gurung, receiving 327 votes against Gurung's 214 votes. She thus became Nepal's second president and first female head of state. She was re-elected in 2018, defeating Congress' Kumari Laxmi Rai.

Bhandari renewed her membership in the CPN (UML) and re-entered active politics in July 2025. She was appointed as senior leader of CPN (UML) in September 2026.

== Controversies ==
Bhandari has been accused of taking a partisan stance since she was elected president. She held onto the National Assembly election ordinance delaying the formation of the government after the 2017 legislative elections. She also held the nomination of three members to National Assembly sent by the outgoing Deuba government but immediately approved the nominations sent in by the incoming Prime Minister KP Sharma Oli. Bhandari passed the ordinance brought for citizenship brought upon by KP Sharma Oli government which was finally denied by Supreme Court to be a matter requiring discussion in parliament. After it came being approved by majority from parliament by Deuba cabinet it was denied by her. Bhandari has been accused of taking a partisan stance when she approved both the decisions of cabinet to dissolve the House of Representatives against the Constitution of Nepal. She did not appoint Sher Bahadur Deuba as Prime Minister of Nepal, although showing majority signature present in House. Instead she dissolved parliament supporting KP Sharma Oli. The decision was challenged by the Supreme Court of Nepal, along with signature of majority (146) MPs. On 12 July 2021, the Supreme Court stated the decision of parliament dissolution by Bhandari was unlawful. Similarly, it ordered to appoint Deuba as the next prime minister of Nepal citing article 76(5) of the Constitution of Nepal within 28 hours. It stated that the decision made by Bhandari was against the norms of the constitution. This was celebrated by the then opposition alliance led by the Nepali Congress, including allies CPN (Maoist Centre) and Janata Samajbadi Party. Bhandari has received criticism for using luxury vehicles for her presidential duties.

On 13 July 2021, Bhandari appointed Deuba as prime minister without including any article of Constitution and stating as per the order of Court. This created cold dispute and people alleged Bhandari was forgetting her limits and being tilted to Oli. After Deuba denied taking oath as per the appointment letter, it was changed and stated that Deuba was made prime minister in accordance with article 76(5) marking Deuba's fifth term as prime minister.

== Personal life ==
Bidya Devi Bhandari was born on 19 June 1961 in Manebhanjyang, Nepal. Bhandari was married to Madan Bhandari, a popular Nepalese communist leader, who died in a car accident near Dasdhunga, Chitwan in 1993. The couple had two daughters, Usha Kiran Bhandari and Nisha Kusum Bhandari. She is also related to Nepali Congress leader Gyanendra Bahadur Karki.

During the 2025 Nepalese Gen Z protests her house in Bhangal, Kathmandu was burned down by a mob of protesters.

House of Representatives of Nepal
Preceded by Madan Bhandari	Member of Parliament for Kathmandu 1; 1994	Succeeded by Man Mohan Adhikari
Preceded by Daman Nath Dhungana	Member of Parliament for Kathmandu 2; 1994–2008	Succeeded by Jhakku Prasad Subedi
Political offices
Preceded by Ram Bahadur Thapa	Minister of Defence; 2009–2011	Succeeded by Bijay Kumar Gachhadar
Preceded by Ram Baran Yadav	President of Nepal; 2015–2023	Succeeded by Ram Chandra Poudel
