= Ministry of Defence (Nepal) =

Nepalese government ministry responsible for military and national defense matters

- रक्षा मन्त्रालय
- Emblem of Nepal

Ministry overview
- Formed: 1950
- Jurisdiction: Government of Nepal
- Headquarters: Singha Durbar, Kathmandu
- Minister responsible: Balendra Shah, Prime minister
- Ministry executive: Suman Raj Aryal, Secretary
- Website: mod.gov.np

The Ministry of Defence is governmental body in Nepal that formulates defence policies and coordinates defence affairs with other agencies of the government and the Nepalese Armed Forces.

== Origin ==
The origin and evolution of the defence administration of modern Nepal dates back to the unification of Nepal in 1770. From the foundation to until popular movement, the defence administration was directly overseen by the Crown itself.

Before 1950, there was no division of duties between the Ministry and the Army headquarters. The Commander-in Chief and the Senior Commanding General between themselves dealt with the whole range of administration and policy regarding defence. For the first time in the history of Nepal, a separate ministry by the name of Defence Ministry was set up in the interim Government of 1950 headed by Prime Minister Mohan Shumsher. The first Defence Minister was Babar Shumsher . The organizational structure of the Defence Ministry at the time was quite simple having only two branches, Viz. (i) General and (ii) Budget. The Ministry had a secretary, two deputy secretaries, and two assistant secretaries. Since then the ministry has undergone continuous evolution and assumed the present structure.

The Ministry of Defence was established to protect and defend the nation and the people from internal instability and external threats by ensuring the sovereignty, national independence and integrity of the country.

== Functions ==
According to Business (Allocation) Regulation 2063, the Ministry of Defence is responsible for the following functions:

- Managing border threats
- Organization and control of the Nepalese Army
- Coordination of Military Training
- Oversight of Military Welfare
- Procurement and Production of military hardware
- Oversight of military activities and military operations
- Oversight and coordination of military construction
- Development of Military academy, installation, communication and transport
- Provision of Military storage
- Enhancement of Military Intelligence capabilities
- Development and establishment of Military Hospitals
- Establishment and Management of Military barracks and offices
- Coordination and direction of military assistance in natural calamities and development
- Organization, Training and Administration of the National Cadet Corps
- Welfare of Retired Military Personnel
- Oversight, establishment and coordination of National Parks and Wildlife reserves
- Provision and procurement of military aircraft
- Welfare schemes
- Coordination with the National Security Council (NSC)

== Objective ==
Ministry of Defence is established as per Government of Nepal Business Allocation Rules, 2069 (2012) with the objective of managing and operating national defence affairs. The Ministry is responsible for maintaining internal as well as external security in order to safeguard the national sovereignty and territorial integrity. Besides its primary responsibility of external security, it is also responsible for maintaining internal law and order by protecting the lives and properties of the people as per the derisory of the government . In this context the principal task of the Defence Ministry is to make policy directions on defence and security matters and communicate them for implementation to the Nepalese Army and its various service departments. Besides, the MoD also acts as a liaison or contact point for communication and interaction for Nepal Army with other Ministries and Departments.
