= Ministry of Culture, Tourism and Civil Aviation =

Government ministry of Nepal

- संस्कृति, पर्यटन तथा नागरिक उड्डयन मन्त्रालय
- Emblem of Nepal

Ministry overview
- Formed: 1978
- Jurisdiction: Government of Nepal
- Headquarters: Singha Durbar, Kathmandu
- Minister responsible: Khadak Raj Paudel, Cabinet Minister
- Ministry executive: Hari Prasad Mainali, Secretary
- Website: tourism.gov.np

The Ministry of Culture, Tourism and Civil Aviation (MoCTCA) is the governmental body for promoting tourism, culture and private sector involvement in Nepal. It also serves as the Nepalese aviation regulatory body. The ministry is located in Singha Durbar, Kathmandu.

== History ==
The Ministry of Tourism was established in 1978 by the Government of Nepal. The portfolios of Civil Aviation and Culture were added in 1982 and 2000 respectively. This structure was dissolved again in 2008, when the ministry was split into the Ministry of Tourism and Civil Aviation on the one side and the Ministry of Culture and State Restructuring on the other side. In 2012, the ministry was again renamed and gained its current form as the Ministry of Culture, Tourism and Civil Aviation.

== Organisational structure ==
The Ministry of Culture, Tourism and Civil Aviation has several departments and subdivisions:

- Civil Aviation Authority of Nepal
- Department of Archaeology
- Nepal Airlines Corporation
- National Lake Conservation Development Committee
- Aviation Security Division
- Department of Tourism
- Nepal Academy
- Nepal Academy of Tourism and Hotel Management (NATHM)
- Nepal Tourism Board
