= Ministry of Law, Justice and Parliamentary Affairs (Nepal) =

Government ministry of Nepal

- कानून, न्याय तथा संसदीय मामिला मन्त्रालय
- Emblem of Nepal

Agency overview
- Formed: 1950
- Jurisdiction: Government of Nepal
- Headquarters: Singha Durbar, Kathmandu, Nepal
- Minister responsible: Sobita Gautam, Cabinet Minister
- Website: www.moljpa.gov.np

The Ministry of Law, Justice and Parliamentary Affairs (Nepali: कानून, न्याय तथा संसदीय मामिला मन्त्रालय) is a governmental body of Nepal dealing with the management of the judicial administration, legal affairs and legislative activities. The minister is one of the most-senior officers in the Federal Cabinet.

Currently the Ministry is led by Minister Sobita Gautam since 27 March,2026.

== History ==
The Department of Law (कानून विभाग) was established in 1950 before being developed into a ministry in 1956. Two years later, the ministry's portfolio was adjusted for the first time, making it the Ministry of Government and Law (कानून तथा संसदीय प्रबन्ध मन्त्रालय). In 1961, it was again renamed to the Ministry of Law and Justice (कानून तथा न्याय मन्त्रालय). The term Parliamentary Affairs was added and dropped several times throughout the history of the ministry.
