= Ministry of Health and Population (Nepal) =

Government ministry of Nepal

Ministry of Health and Food Safety
- स्वास्थ्य तथा खाद्य स्वच्छता मन्त्रालय
- Emblem of Nepal

Government agency of Nepal overview
- Dissolved: 13 May 2026
- Superseding Government agency of Nepal: Ministry of Health and Food Safety
- Jurisdiction: Government of Nepal
- Headquarters: Ramshah Path, Kathmandu
- Annual budget: NRs 33.52 billion (2014/2015)
- Minister responsible: Nisha Mehta, last minister
- Government agency of Nepal executives: Dr. Bikash Devkota, Secretary; Hari Prasad Mainali, Secretary
- Key document: National Health Policy 2071
- Website: mohp.gov.np

The Ministry of Health and Food Safety (MoHFS) was a governmental body of Nepal in charge of regulating the healthcare system and its implementation. Which also included environment ministry. The ministry's tasks was to manifold and include managing the development of the healthcare in Nepal, overseeing population policies, planning and implementation and overseeing non-governmental associated with health services in Nepal.

The ministry was restructured on 13 May 2026 to form new ministry named Ministry of Health and Food Safety.

== Health care facilities ==
The Ministry of Health and Population runs and oversees all public hospitals in Nepal. These include four regional hospitals, 11 zonal hospitals, five teaching hospitals, as well as district hospitals and general hospitals.

== Organisational structure ==
Bikas Devkota currently holds the position of Secretary of the Ministry of Health and Population. Roshan Pokhrel formerly held the position of health secretary. The Department of Health Services serves under the ministry to facilitate and implement its work, mainly deliver health services and to maintain public hospitals. Furthermore, two other departments also work under and with the ministry:

- Department of Ayurveda
- Department of Drug Administration (established 1979)

== See also ==
- Health in Nepal
