= Interim legislature of Nepal =

2007–2008 government of Nepal

Interim Legislature Parliament of Nepal
←	4th HoR	1st CA	→
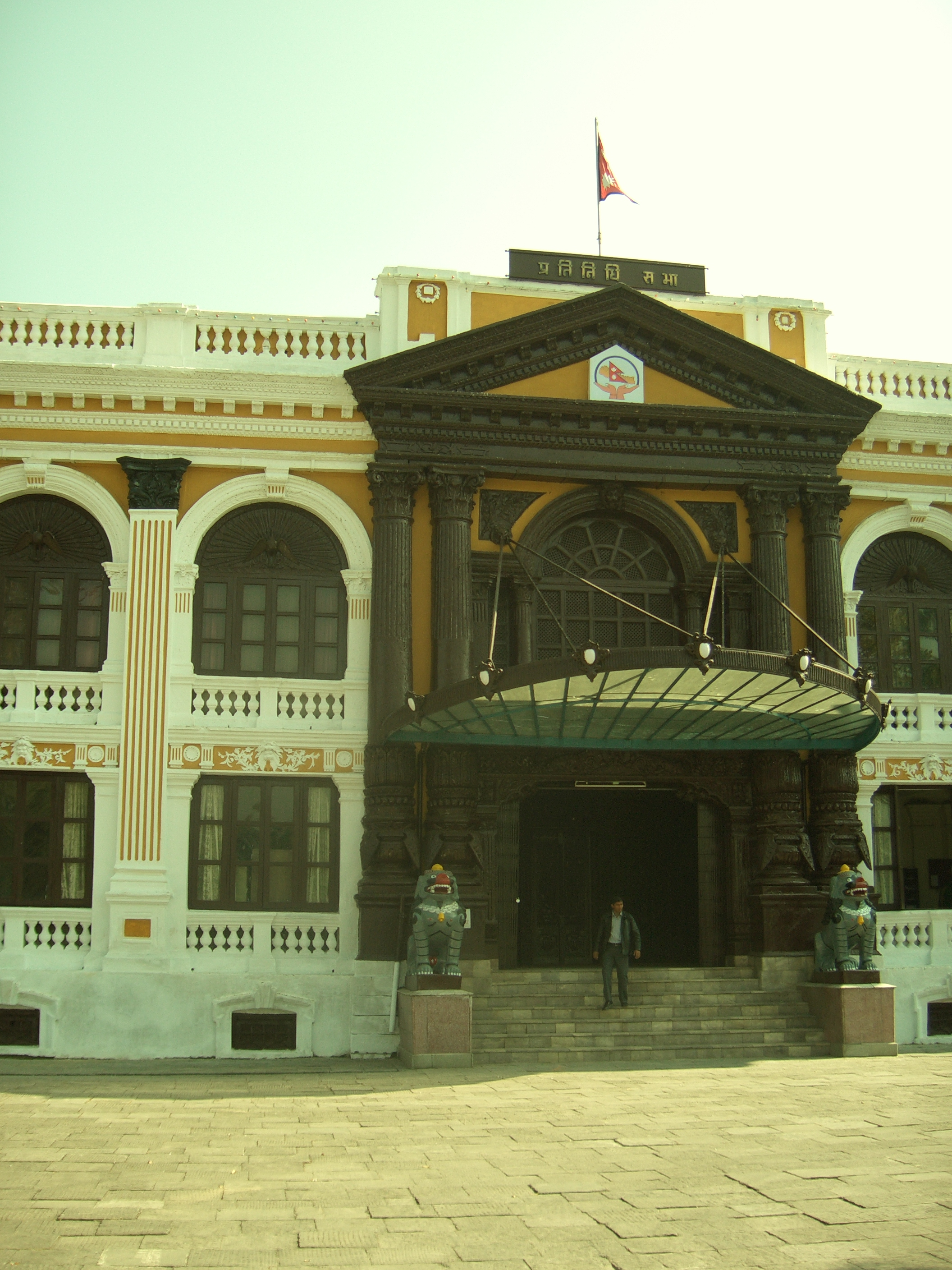
- Gallery Baithak

Overview
- Legislative body: Parliament of Nepal
- Jurisdiction: Nepal
- Meeting place: Gallery Baithak
- Term: 28 April 2006 – 16 January 2008
- Election: 1999 general election
- Government: Fifth G.P. Koirala cabinet G.P. Koirala interim cabinet

Legislature Parliament
- Members: 329
- Speaker: Subas Chandra Nemwang (UML)
- Deputy Speaker: Chitra Lekha Yadav (NC)
- Prime Minister: Girija Prasad Koirala (NC)

The Interim Legislature Parliament of Nepal, previously known as the Reinstated House of Representatives, was the legislature of Nepal formed in the aftermath of the 2006 Nepalese revolution and the Comprehensive Peace Accord signed with the Communist Party of Nepal (Maoist).

== Background ==
King Gyanendra of Nepal had dissolved the House of Representatives on 21 May 2002. The parliament was reinstated on 24 April 2006 with 204 of the original members. The first meeting of the reinstated parliament was held four days later on 28 April 2006. On 15 January 2007, an interim legislative parliament was formed after the Comprehensive Peace Accord was between the Seven Party Alliance and the Communist Party of Nepal (Maoist). The Maoists were included in the new parliament and the total number of members was increased to 329.

== Composition ==
Party	Reinstated Parliament	Nominated Members	Interim Legislative Parliament
Nepali Congress	71	15	85 (Note: Gopal Rai died in a helicopter crash in September 2006 before the Interim Legislature Parliament was formed)
CPN (UML)	66	17	83
CPN (Maoist)	—	83	83
Nepali Congress (Democratic)	40	8	48
Rastriya Prajatantra Party	7	0	6 (Note: Ram Charan Shrestha was murdered in September 2006 before the Interim Legislature Parliament was formed)
Nepal Sadbhavana Party (Anandidevi)	2	3	5
Janamorcha Nepal (Note: Successor of Samyukta Janamorcha Nepal)	1	3	4
Nepal Workers Peasants Party	1	3	4
Rastriya Janamorcha	3	0	3
United Left Front	—	3	3
CPN (Unified)	2	0	2
Rastriya Janashakti Party	2	0	2
Nepal Sadhbhawana	1	0	1
Total	196 (Note: Excluding reinstated members barred from the Interim Legislature (see below).)	135	329

== Members ==
Nepali Congress
Reinstated Members
Constituency	Member of Parliament
Parsa 2	Ajaya Kumar Chaurasiya
Parbat 1	Arjun Prasad Joshi
Dhanusha 3	Ananda Prasad Dhungana
Morang 1	Amod Prasad Upadhyaya
Chitwan 2	Eknath Ranabhat
Gorkha 2	Kamala Devi Panta
Bardiya 1	Kashi Paudel
Rukum 1	Keshar Man Rokka
Banke 3	Kailash Nath Kasudhan
Jhapa 1	Krishna Prasad Sitaula
Dang Deukhuri 1	Khum Bahadur Khadka
Sunsari 5	Girija Prasad Koirala
Jhapa 6	Gopal Prasad Koirala
Tanahu 1	Govinda Raj Joshi
Chitwan 3	Gangadhar Lamsal
Jhapa 4	Chakra Prasad Bastola
Bajura 1	Janak Raj Giri
Saptari 1	Jay Prakash Gupta
Baglung 1	Tanka Prasad Sharma Kadel
Parbat 2	Dilli Raj Sharma
Kaski 1	Taranath Ranabhat
Kanchanpur 2	Tarini Dutt Chataut
Kathmandu 7	Tirtha Ram Dangol
Nawalparasi 1	Damodar Bastakoti
Darchula 1	Dilendra Prasad Badu
Rupandehi 1	Duryodhan Singh
Nawalparasi 4	Devendra Raj Kandel
Manang 1	Palten Gurung
Sarlahi 4	Nagendra Kumar Ray
Kailali 3	Pushkar Nath Oja
Bara 4	Farmulla Mansur
Dang Deukhuri 2	Bal Dev Sharma
Ilam 1	Benup Raj Prasai
Sarlahi 5	Mahantha Thakur
Kaski 2	Mahadev Gurung
Mahottari 4	Mahendra Kumar Raya
Morang 5	Mahesh Acharya
Rautahat 2	Mohammad Aftab Alam
Saptari 2	Ram Kumar Chaudhary
Rupandehi 2	Ram Krishna Tamrakar
Mahottari 2	Ram Chandra Tiwari
Tanahu 2	Ram Chandra Poudel
Dhading 2	Ram Nath Adhikari
Lamjung 1	Ram Bahadur Gurung
Achham 2	Ram Bahadur Bista
Dhanusha 5	Dr. Ram Baran Yadav
Nuwakot 2	Ram Sharan Mahat
Ramechhap 2	Ram Hari Dhungel
Mustang 1	Romy Gauchan Thakali
Rolpa 1	Lekh Nath Acharya
Bhaktapur 2	Lekh Nath Neupane
Baitadi 2	Binayadhoj Chand
Kapilvastu 3	Birendra Kumar Kanudiya
Khotang 2	Shiva Kumar Basnet
Kavrepalanchok 2	Shiva Prasad Humagain
Dailekh 2	Shiva Raj Joshi
Surkhet 3	Shiv Raj Joshi
Syangja 3	Shanker Prasad Pandey
Chitwan 1	Sabitri Bogati (Pathak)
Doti 2	Siddha Raj Ojha
Parsa 3	Surendra Prasad Chaudhary
Rolpa 2	Surendra Hamal
Bajhang 2	Suresh Malla
Banke 2	Sushil Koirala
Rupandehi 3	Surya Prasad Pradhan
Dhanusha 1	Smriti Narayan Chaudhari
Sunsari 4	Hari Prasad Sapkota
Lamjung 2	Haribhakta Adhikari
Surkhet 2	Rhidya Ram Thani
Banke 1	Gyanu K.C.
Nominated Members
Amresh Kumar Singh
Ashok Koirala
Kul Bahadur Gurung
Krishna Kumar Shrestha
Dipak Bahadur Gurung
Dinbandhu Shrestha
Bal Bahadur Rai
Mitharam Bishwakarma
Maiya Devi Shrestha
Yagya Raj Pathak
Radheshyam Adhikari
Sita Devi Yadav
Sujata Koirala
Harihar Dahal
Bhim Bahadur Tamang

CPN (UML)
Reinstated Members
Constituency	Member of Parliament
Taplejung 1	Til Kumar Menyangbo Limbu
Taplejung 2	Om Prasad Ojha
Panchthar 1	Basanta Kumar Nemwang
Panchthar 2	Damber Singh Sambahamphe
Ilam 2	Subas Chandra Nemwang
Jhapa 2	K. P. Sharma Oli
Jhapa 5	Tara Sam Yongya
Sankhuwasabha 2	Parshuram Megi Gurung
Tehrathum 1	Bijay Subba
Bhojpur 1	Ghanendra Basnet
Bhojpur 2	Sher Dhan Rai
Dhankuta 1	Durga Linkha
Morang 2	Bharat Mohan Adhikari
Morang 3	Lal Babu Pandit
Morang 4	Harka Man Tamang
Sunsari 1	Kunta Sharma
Udayapur 1	Suresh Kumar Rai
Udayapur 2	Jagannath Khatiwada
Saptari 4	Jagadish Prasad Sah
Siraha 1	Ram Chandra Yadav
Siraha 5	Dharmanath Prasad Sah
Dolakha 1	Pahupati Chaulagain
Dolakha 2	Anand Prasad Pokharel
Ramechhap 1	Kamal Prakash Sunuwar
Sindhuli 1	Ganga Prasad Nepal
Sindhuli 2	Shankar Nath Sharma Adhikari
Dhanusha 2	Yog Narayan Yadav
Sarlahi 1	Mahendra Raya Yadav
Dhading 3	Rajendra Prasad Pandey
Nuwakot 1	Rajendra Prakash Lohani
Nuwakot 3	Mahendra Bahadur Pandey
Kathmandu 1	Pradeep Nepal
Kathmandu 2	Bidhya Devi Bhandari
Kathmandu 3	Ishwar Pokhrel
Kathmandu 5	Mangal Siddhi Manandhar
Kathmandu 6	Astalaxmi Shakya
Lalitpur 1	Sushila Nepal
Lalitpur 2	Krishna Lal Maharjan
Lalitpur 3	Raghuji Pant
Kavrepalanchok 1	Shiva Bahadur Deuja
Sindhupalchok 2	Subash Karmacharya
Makwanpur 1	Krishna Prasad Dulal
Makwanpur 2	Birodh Khatiwada
Makwanpur 3	Bir Bahadur Lama
Rautahat 1	Madhav Kumar Nepal
Rautahat 3	Banshidhar Mishra
Bara 2	Sohan Prasad Chaudhary
Parsa 4	Urmila Aryal
Tanahu 3	Tuk Raj Sigdel
Syangja 1	Hit Kaji Gurung
Gulmi 1	Fatik Bahadur Thapa
Gulmi 2	Pradeep Kumar Gyawali
Gulmi 3	Gokarna Raj Bista
Palpa 1	Bhadra Bahadur Thapa
Palpa 2	Som Prasad Pandey
Palpa 3	Yadav Bahadur Rayamajhi
Arghakhanchi 2	Dilli Raj Khanal
Nawalparasi 2	Chandra Mani Kharel
Kapilvastu 1	Dan Bahadur Chaudhari
Rukum 2	Tirtha Gautam
Salyan 1	Prakash Jwala
Mugu 1	Chandra Bahadur Shahi
Jumla 1	Devi Lal Thapa
Humla 1	Gorakh Bahadur Bogati
Jajarkot 2	Ratna Prasad Sharma Neupane
Dailekh 1	Nar Bahadur Hamal
Nominated Members
Amrit Kumar Bohara
Urbadutta Pant
Chudamani Jangali
Jayanti Rai
Jhala Nath Khanal
Parbati Chaudhary
Paro Devi Yadav
Beduram Bhusal
Ramprit Paswan
Rizwan Ansari
Rima Nepali
Ranganath Joshi
Laxmi Das Manandhar
Lalit Kumar Basnet
Bam Dev Gautam
Shanti Pakhrin
Shreemaya Thakali

CPN (Maoist)
Nominated Members
Amrita Thapa
Indrajit Tharu
Iliyas Musalman
Uma Bhujel
Uma B.K.
Kamala Roka
Kumar Phudung
Kumari Moktan
Krishna Acharya
Krishna Dev Singh Danuwar
Krishna Bahadur Mahara
Khadga Bahadur B.K
Khim Lal Devkota
Gam Bahadur Shresh Magar
Ganga Narayan Shrestha
Chinak Kurmi
Janardan Sharma
Jaypuri Gharti
Tika Budhathoki
Tanka Aangbuhang Limbu
Tilak Pariyar
Dama Sherpa
Dilip Maharjan
Dina Nath Sharma
Dev Gurung
Devi Khadka
Dharma Sila Chapagain
Nanda Singh Sarki
Narayan Prasad Dahal
Narayan Prasad Regmi
Narayani Devi Shrestha
Padam Bahadur Rai
Padam Lal Bishwakarma
Parmananda Burma Kurmi
Parshuram Ramtel
Puran Rana Tharu
Purna Singh Rajbanshi
Purna Kumari Subedi
Prabhu Sah
Phurbi Sherpa
Balabati Sharma
Budhhiman Majhi
Bhagwati Pradhan
Bhakta Bahadur Shah
Bharat Prasad Shah
Bhikchu Ananda
Manju Bam
Mani Khambu
Malla K Sundar
Mahendra Paswan
Matrika Prasad Yadav
Motidevi Chaudhary
Mangal Bishwakarma
Ram Ashraya Ram
Ram Kumari Yadav
Ramcharan Chaudhari (Tharu)
Ramlaut Tiwari
Rupa Chaudhary
Rupa B.K.
Lekh Raj Bhatta
Lokendra Bista
Bamdev Kshetri
Binod Kumar Upadhyaya
Shanta Shrestha
Shalikram Jamkattel
Shila Yadav
Shiva Kumar Mandal
Shobha Kattel
Satya Narayan Bhagat Ween
Satya Pahadi
Santosh Kumar Budha Magar
Sarala Regmi
Saraswati Chaudhary
Saraswati Mohara
Sabitri Gurung Dura
Sita B.K.
Sudarshan Baral
Suresh Kumar Ale Magar
Suryanath Prasad Yadav
Surya Man Dong Tamang
Hari Rokka
Hit Bahadur Tamang
Hisila Yami

Nepali Congress (Democratic)
Reinstated Members
Constituency	Member of Parliament
Ilam 3	Keshav Thapa
Jhapa 3	Narendra Bikram Nemwang
Sankhuwasabha 1	Tanka Prasad Rai
Morang 6	Hari Narayan Chaudhary
Sunsari 2	Bijay Kumar Gachhadar
Sunsari 3	Laxman Prasad Mehta
Solukhumbu 1	Bal Bahadur K.C.
Khotang 1	Sarba Dhan Rai
Okhaldhunga 1	Hom Nath Dhakal
Siraha 2	Chitra Lekha Yadav
Mahottari 1	Mahendra Yadav
Mahottari 3	Sharat Singh Bhandari
Rasuwa 1	Dil Bahadur Lama
Kathmandu 4	Prem Lal Singh
Kavrepalanchok 3	Rajendra Kharel
Sindhupalchok 1	Mohan Bahadur Basnet
Bara 1	Umakant Chaudhary
Bara 3	Rishikesh Gautam
Parsa 1	Krishna Prasad Bhattarai
Chitwan 4	Narayan Sharma Paudel
Gorkha 1	Chiranjibi Wagle
Gorkha 3	Hari Lal Joshi
Kaski 3	Prakash Bahadur Gurung
Syangja 2	Gopal Man Shrestha
Rupandehi 4	Bharat Kumar Shah
Dang Deukhuri 3	Krishna Kishor Ghimire
Dang Deukhuri 4	Gehendra Giri
Surkhet 1	Purna Bahadur Khadka
Bardiya 2	Mangal Prasad Tharu
Bardiya 3	Khemraj Bhatta 'Mayalu'
Bajhang 1	Arjun Jang Bahadur Singh
Achham 1	Gobinda Bahadur Shah
Doti 1	Bhakta Bahadur Balayar
Kailali 1	Sushila Swar
Kailali 2	Ram Janam Chaudhary
Kailali 4	Tek Bahadur Chokhyal
Dadeldhura 1	Sher Bahadur Deuba
Baitadi 1	Narendra Bahadur Bum
Kanchanpur 1	Narayan Prakash Saud
Kanchanpur 3	Ramesh Lekhak
Nominated Members
Akkal Bahadur Bista
Uma Adhikari Regmi
Prakash Man Singh
Dr. Prakash Sharan Mahat
Pradeep Giri
Minendra Rijal
Ram Jeevan Singh
Bimalendra Nidhi

Rastriya Prajatantra Party
Reinstated Members
Constituency	Member of Parliament
Kapilvastu 4	Ajaya Pratap Shah
Dhanusha 4	Krishna Pratap Malla
Salyan 2	Netra Lal Shrestha
Sindhupalchok 3	Pashupati Shamsher Jang Bahadur Rana
Jajarkot 1	Govinda Bikram Shah
Sarlahi 3	Ram Chandra Ray

Nepal Sadbhavana Party (Anandidevi)
Elected Members
Constituency	Member of Parliament
Sarlahi 2	Rajendra Mahato
Nawalparasi 3	Hridayesh Tripathi
Nominated Members
Anandidevi Singh
Govinda Tharu
Bharat Bimal Yadav

Janamorcha Nepal
Elected Members
Constituency	Member of Parliament
Sindhuli 3	Lila Mani Pokharel
Nominated Members
Anjana Bisankhe
Asarphi Sada
Kaman Singh Lama

Nepal Majdoor Kisan Party
Elected Members
Constituency	Member of Parliament
Bhaktapur 1	Narayan Man Bijukchhe
Nominated Members
Jagya Bahadur Shahi
Lila Nyaichyain
Sunil Prajapati

Rastriya Janamorcha
Elected Members
Constituency	Member of Parliament
Arghakhanchi 1	Dilaram Acharya
Baglung 2	Chitra Bahadur K.C.
Pyuthan 1	Hari Acharya

Left Front
Nominated Members
Ganesh Shah
Chandra Prakash Mainali
Nanda Kumar Prasai

Communist Party of Nepal (Unified)
Elected Members
Constituency	Member of Parliament
Baglung 3	Pari Thapa
Pyuthan 2	Nava Raj Subedi

Rastriya Janashakti Party
Elected Members
Constituency	Member of Parliament
Dhankuta 2	Surya Bahadur Thapa
Saptari 3	Renu Kumari Yadav

Nepal Sadbhavana Party
Elected Members
Constituency	Member of Parliament
Rupandehi 5	Yagyajit Shah

=== Changes ===
Constituency	MP	Party	Date of vacation	Cause of vacation
Siraha 4	Hem Narayan Yadav	CPN (UML)	Died before joining	Murdered on 2 February 2005
Siraha 3	Krishna Charan Shrestha	RPP	23 September 2006	Murdered
Okhaldhunga 2	Gopal Rai	Congress	23 September 2006	Death in helicopter crash
Dolpa 1	Nar Bahadur Budhathoki	CPN (UML)	15 January 2007	Barred from Interim Legislature for supporting the royal coup
Kalikot 1	Prem Bahadur Singh	CPN (UML)	15 January 2007	Barred from Interim Legislature for supporting the royal coup
Myagdi 1	Narayan Singh Pun	Congress	15 January 2007	Barred from Interim Legislature for supporting the royal coup
Rautahat 4	Prakash Koirala	Congress	15 January 2007	Barred from Interim Legislature for supporting the royal coup
Dhading 1	Buddhi Man Tamang	RPP	15 January 2007	Barred from Interim Legislature for supporting the royal coup
Kapilvastu 2	Brijesh Kumar Gupta	RPP	15 January 2007	Barred from Interim Legislature for supporting the royal coup
Morang 7	Badri Prasad Mandal	Sadbhawana	15 January 2007	Barred from Interim Legislature for supporting the royal coup
Saptari 5	Mrigendra Kumar Singh Yadav	Sadbhawana	15 January 2007	Barred from Interim Legislature for supporting the royal coup

== See also ==
- 2005 Nepal coup d'état
- 2006 Nepalese revolution
- Nepalese Civil War
- Comprehensive Peace Accord
