= 4th House of Representatives (Nepal) =

←	3rd HoR	Interim Legislature	→
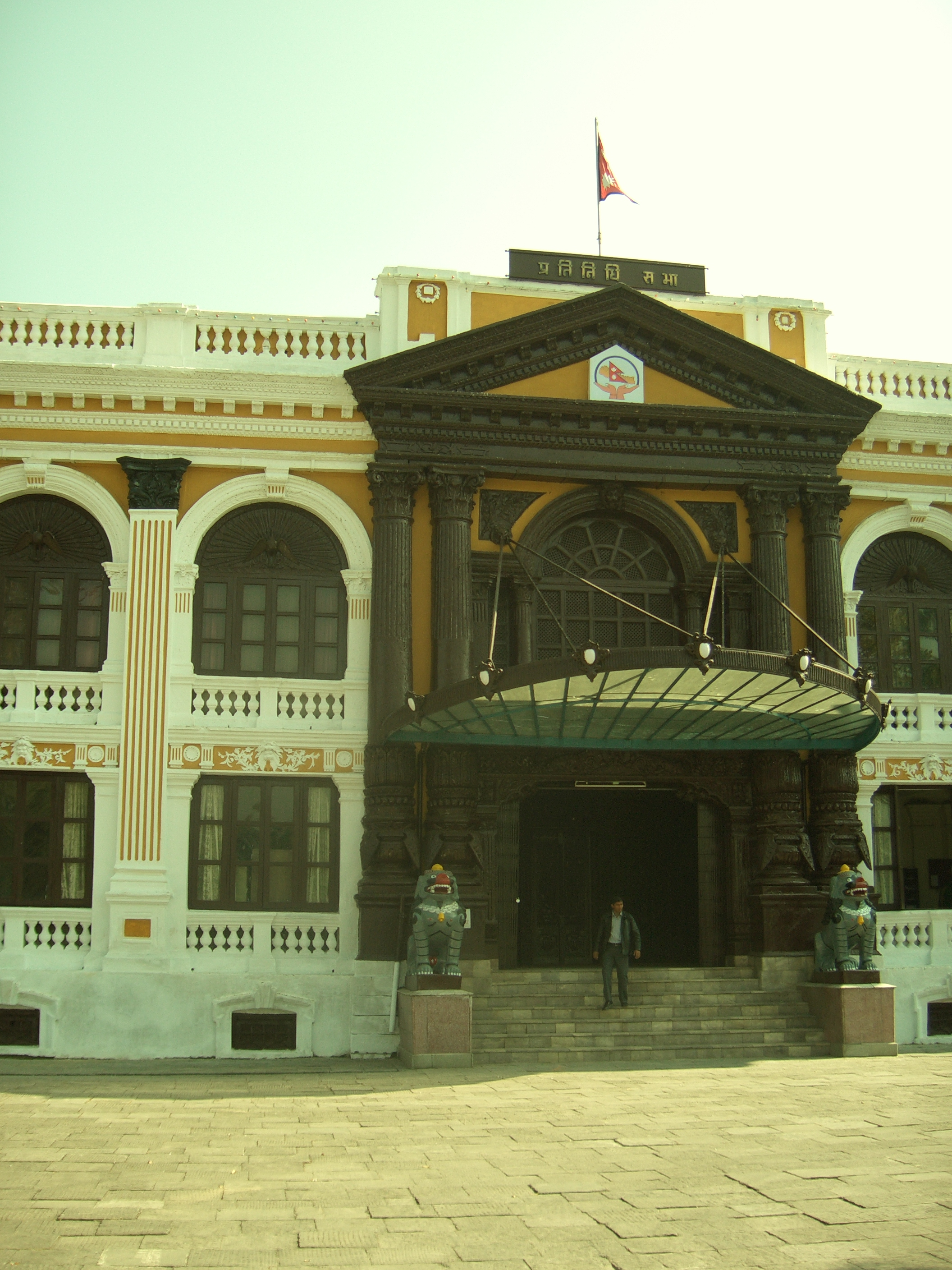
- Gallery Baithak

Overview
- Legislative body: Parliament of the Kingdom of Nepal
- Jurisdiction: Kingdom of Nepal
- Meeting place: Gallery Baithak
- Term: May 1999 – May 2002
- Election: 1999 general election
- Government: K.P. Bhattarai cabinet Fourth G.P. Koirala cabinet Third Deuba cabinet

House of Representatives
- Members: 205
- Speaker: Taranath Ranabhat (NC)
- Prime Minister: Krishna Prasad Bhattarai (NC); Girija Prasad Koirala (NC); Sher Bahadur Deuba (NC)
- Leader of Opposition: Madhav Kumar Nepal (UML)

The 4th House of Representatives was elected at the 1999 Nepalese general election. All 205 members were elected from constituencies using the first-past-the-post system.

The list of elected members is arranged by constituency. Tara Nath Ranabhat served as the Speaker. There were three prime ministers before the parliament was dissolved in 2002. Krishna Prasad Bhattarai, Girija Prasad Koirala and Sher Bahadur Deuba served as prime ministers during the term of this parliament.

== House composition ==
4th House of Representatives

Parliament at dissolution in 2002

Parliament at start of term

Party	Members	
Party	After election	At dissolution
Nepali Congress	111	113
CPN (UML)	71	69
Rastriya Prajatantra Party	11	11
Nepal Sadbhawana Party	5	5
Rastriya Janamorcha	5	5
Nepal Workers Peasants Party	1	1
Samyukta Janamorcha	1	1
Total	205	205

== Leaders ==
=== Officeholders ===
- Speaker of the House: Rt. Hon. Taranath Ranabhat (Nepali Congress)
  - Deputy Speaker of the House: Hon. Chitra Lekha Yadav (Nepali Congress)
- Prime Minister of Nepal (Nepali Congress):
  - Hon. Krishna Prasad Bhattarai (until 17 March 2000)
  - Hon. Girija Prasad Koirala (from 20 March 2000 to 19 July 2001)
  - Hon. Sher Bahadur Deuba (from 22 July 2001)
- Leader of the Opposition (CPN (UML)): Hon. Madhav Kumar Nepal

=== Whips ===
- Government Chief Whip (Nepali Congress):
  - Hon. Gopal Man Shrestha (until 21 April 2000)
  - Hon. Binaya Dhoj Chand (from 21 April 2000 to 23 July 2001)
  - Hon. Tek Bahadur Basnet (from 23 July 2001)
  - Government Whip (Nepali Congress):
    - Hon. Tek Bahadur Basnet (until 21 April 2000)
    - Hon. Tek Bahadur Chokhyal (from 21 April 2000 to 22 July 2001)
    - Hon. Ramesh Lekhak (From 23 August 2001)
- Opposition Chief Whip (CPN (UML)): Hon. Bharat Mohan Adhikari
  - Opposition Whip (CPN (UML): Hon. Parshuram Meghi Gurung

== Members of the House ==
Constituency	Winner	Party
Taplejung 1	Til Kumar Menyangbo Limbu	CPN (UML)
Taplejung 2	Om Prasad Ojha	CPN (UML)
Panchthar 1	Basanta Kumar Nemwang	CPN (UML)
Panchthar 2	Damber Singh Sambahamphe	CPN (UML)
Ilam 1	Benup Raj Prasai	Nepali Congress
Ilam 2	Subas Chandra Nemwang	CPN (UML)
Ilam 3	Keshav Thapa	Nepali Congress
Jhapa 1	Krishna Prasad Sitaula	Nepali Congress
Jhapa 2	K. P. Sharma Oli	CPN (UML)
Jhapa 3	Narendra Bikram Nemwang	Nepali Congress
Jhapa 4	Chakra Prasad Bastola	Nepali Congress
Jhapa 5	Tara Sam Yongya	CPN (UML)
Jhapa 6	Gopal Prasad Koirala	Nepali Congress
Sankhuwasabha 1	Tanka Prasad Rai	Nepali Congress
Sankhuwasabha 2	Parshuram Megi Gurung	CPN (UML)
Tehrathum 1	Bijay Subba	CPN (UML)
Bhojpur 1	Ghanendra Basnet	CPN (UML)
Bhojpur 2	Sher Dhan Rai	CPN (UML)
Dhankuta 1	Durga Linkha	CPN (UML)
Dhankuta 2	Surya Bahadur Thapa	Rastriya Prajatantra Party
Morang 1	Amod Prasad Upadhyay	Nepali Congress
Morang 2	Bharat Mohan Adhikari	CPN (UML)
Morang 3	Lal Babu Pandit	CPN (UML)
Morang 4	Harka Man Tamang	CPN (UML)
Morang 5	Mahesh Acharya	Nepali Congress
Morang 6	Hari Narayan Chaudhary	Nepali Congress
Morang 7	Badri Prasad Mandal	Nepal Sadbhawana Party
Sunsari 1	Kunta Sharma	CPN (UML)
Sunsari 2	Bijay Kumar Gachhadar	Nepali Congress
Sunsari 3	Laxman Prasad Mehta	Nepali Congress
Sunsari 4	Hari Prasad Sapkota	Nepali Congress
Sunsari 5	Girija Prasad Koirala	Nepali Congress
Solukhumbu 1	Bal Bahadur K.C.	Nepali Congress
Khotang 1	Sarba Dhan Rai	Nepali Congress
Khotang 2	Shiva Kumar Basnet	Nepali Congress
Okhaldhunga 1	Hom Nath Dhakal	Nepali Congress
Okhaldhunga 2	Gopal Rai	Nepali Congress
Udayapur 1	Suresh Kumar Rai	CPN (UML)
Udayapur 2	Jagannath Khatiwada	CPN (UML)
Saptari 1	Jay Prakash Gupta	Nepali Congress
Saptari 2	Ram Kumar Chaudhary	Nepali Congress
Saptari 3	Renu Kumari Yadav	Rastriya Prajatantra Party
Saptari 4	Jagadish Prasad Sah	CPN (UML)
Saptari 5	Mrigendra Kumar Singh Yadav	Nepal Sadbhawana Party
Siraha 1	Ram Chandra Yadav	CPN (UML)
Siraha 2	Chitra Lekha Yadav	Nepali Congress
Siraha 3	Krishna Charan Shrestha	Rastriya Prajatantra Party
Siraha 4	Hem Narayan Yadav	CPN (UML)
Siraha 5	Dharmanath Prasad Sah	CPN (UML)
Dolakha 1	Pashupati Chaulagain	CPN (UML)
Dolakha 2	Anand Prasad Pokharel	CPN (UML)
Ramechhap 1	Kamal Prakash Sunuwar	CPN (UML)
Ramechhap 2	Ram Hari Dhungel	Nepali Congress
Sindhuli 1	Ganga Prasad Nepal	CPN (UML)
Sindhuli 2	Shankar Nath Sharma Adhikari	CPN (UML)
Sindhuli 3	Lila Mani Pokharel	Samyukta Janamorcha
Dhanusha 1	Smriti Narayan Chaudhari	Nepali Congress
Dhanusha 2	Yog Narayan Yadav	CPN (UML)
Dhanusha 3	Ananda Prasad Dhungana	Nepali Congress
Dhanusha 4	Krishna Pratap Malla	Rastriya Prajatantra Party
Dhanusha 5	Ram Baran Yadav	Nepali Congress
Mahottari 1	Mahendra Yadav	Nepali Congress
Mahottari 2	Ram Chandra Tiwari	Nepali Congress
Mahottari 3	Sharat Singh Bhandari	Nepali Congress
Mahottari 4	Mahendra Kumar Raya	Nepali Congress
Sarlahi 1	Mahindra Ray Yadav	CPN (UML)
Sarlahi 2	Rajendra Mahato	Nepal Sadbhawana Party
Sarlahi 3	Ram Chandra Ray	Rastriya Prajatantra Party
Sarlahi 4	Nagendra Kumar Ray	Nepali Congress
Sarlahi 5	Mahantha Thakur	Nepali Congress
Rasuwa 1	Dil Bahadur Lama	Nepali Congress
Dhading 1	Budhhiman Tamang	Rastriya Prajatantra Party
Dhading 2	Ram Nath Adhikari	Nepali Congress
Dhading 3	Rajendra Prasad Pandey	CPN (UML)
Nuwakot 1	Rajendra Prakash Lohani	CPN (UML)
Nuwakot 2	Ram Saran Mahat	Nepali Congress
Nuwakot 3	Mahendra Bahadur Pandey	CPN (UML)
Kathmandu 1	Pradeep Nepal	CPN (UML)
Kathmandu 2	Bidhya Devi Bhandari	CPN (UML)
Kathmandu 3	Ishwar Pokhrel	CPN (UML)
Kathmandu 4	Prem Lal Singh	Nepali Congress
Kathmandu 5	Mangal Siddhi Manandhar	CPN (UML)
Kathmandu 6	Astalaxmi Shakya	CPN (UML)
Kathmandu 7	Tirtha Ram Dangol	Nepali Congress
Bhaktapur 1	Narayan Man Bijukchhe	Nepal Workers Peasants Party
Bhaktapur 2	Lekh Nath Neupane	Nepali Congress
Lalitpur 1	Sushila Nepal	CPN (UML)
Lalitpur 2	Krishna Lal Maharjan	CPN (UML)
Lalitpur 3	Raghuji Pant	CPN (UML)
Kavrepalanchok 1	Shiva Bahadur Deuja	CPN (UML)
Kavrepalanchok 2	Shiva Prasad Humagain	Nepali Congress
Kavrepalanchok 3	Rajendra Kharel	Nepali Congress
Sindhupalchok 1	Mohan Bahadur Basnet	Nepali Congress
Sindhupalchok 2	Subash Karmacharya	CPN (UML)
Sindhupalchok 3	Pashupati S.J.B. Rana	Rastriya Prajatantra Party
Makwanpur 1	Krishna Prasad Dulal	CPN (UML)
Makwanpur 2	Birodh Khatiwada	CPN (UML)
Makwanpur 3	Bir Bahadur Lama	CPN (UML)
Rautahat 1	Madhav Kumar Nepal	CPN (UML)
Rautahat 2	Mohammad Aftab Alam	Nepali Congress
Rautahat 3	Bansidhar Mishra	CPN (UML)
Rautahat 4	Prakash Koirala	Nepali Congress
Bara 1	Uma Kanta Chaudhari	Nepali Congress
Bara 2	Sohan Prasad Chaudhary	CPN (UML)
Bara 3	Rishikesh Gautam	Nepali Congress
Bara 4	Farmulla Mansur	Nepali Congress
Parsa 1	Krishna Prasad Bhattarai	Nepali Congress
Parsa 2	Ajaya Kumar Chaurasiya	Nepali Congress
Parsa 3	Surendra Prasad Chaudhary	Nepali Congress
Parsa 4	Urmila Aryal	CPN (UML)
Chitwan 1	Sabitri Bogati	Nepali Congress
Chitwan 2	Eknath Ranabhat	Nepali Congress
Chitwan 3	Gangadhar Lamsal	Nepali Congress
Chitwan 4	Narayan Sharma Paudel	Nepali Congress
Gorkha 1	Chiranjibi Wagle	Nepali Congress
Gorkha 2	Kamala Devi Panta	Nepali Congress
Gorkha 3	Hari Lal Joshi	Nepali Congress
Manang 1	Palten Gurung	Nepali Congress
Lamjung 1	Ram Bahadur Gurung	Nepali Congress
Lamjung 2	Hari Bhakta Adhikari	Nepali Congress
Kaski 1	Taranath Ranabhat	Nepali Congress
Kaski 2	Mahadev Gurung	Nepali Congress
Kaski 3	Prakash Bahadur Gurung	Nepali Congress
Tanahu 1	Govinda Raj Joshi	Nepali Congress
Tanahu 2	Ram Chandra Poudel	Nepali Congress
Tanahu 3	Tuk Raj Sigdel	CPN (UML)
Syangja 1	Hit Kaji Gurung	CPN (UML)
Syangja 2	Gopal Man Shrestha	Nepali Congress
Syangja 3	Shankar Prasad Pandey	Nepali Congress
Gulmi 1	Fatik Bahadur Thapa	CPN (UML)
Gulmi 2	Pradeep Kumar Gyawali	CPN (UML)
Gulmi 3	Gokarna Raj Bista	CPN (UML)
Palpa 1	Bhadra Bahadur Thapa	CPN (UML)
Palpa 2	Som Prasad Pandey	CPN (UML)
Palpa 3	Yadav Bahadur Rayamajhi	CPN (UML)
Arghakhanchi 1	Dilaram Acharya	Rastriya Janamorcha
Arghakhanchi 2	Dilli Raj Khanal	CPN (UML)
Nawalparasi 1	Damodar Bastakoti	Nepali Congress
Nawalparasi 2	Chandra Mani Kharel	CPN (UML)
Nawalparasi 3	Hridayesh Tripathi	Nepal Sadbhawana Party
Nawalparasi 4	Devendra Raj Kandel	Nepali Congress
Rupandehi 1	Duryodhan Singh	Nepali Congress
Rupandehi 2	Ram Krishna Tamrakar	Nepali Congress
Rupandehi 3	Surya Prasad Pradhan	Nepali Congress
Rupandehi 4	Bharat Kumar Shah	Nepali Congress
Rupandehi 5	Yagyajit Shah	Nepal Sadbhawana Party
Kapilvastu 1	Dan Bahadur Chaudhary	CPN (UML)
Kapilvastu 2	Brijesh Kumar Gupta	Rastriya Prajatantra Party
Kapilvastu 3	Birendra Kumar Kanudiya	Nepali Congress
Kapilvastu 4	Ajaya Pratap Shah	Rastriya Prajatantra Party
Mustang 1	Romy Gauchan Thakali	Nepali Congress
Myagdi 1	Narayan Singh Pun	Nepali Congress
Baglung 1	Tanka Prasad Sharma Kadel	Nepali Congress
Baglung 2	Chitra Bahadur K.C.	Rastriya Janamorcha
Baglung 3	Pari Thapa	Rastriya Janamorcha
Parbat 1	Arjun Prasad Joshi	Nepali Congress
Parbat 2	Dilli Raj Sharma	Nepali Congress
Rukum 1	Keshar Man Rokka	Nepali Congress
Rukum 2	Tirtha Gautam	CPN (UML)
Rolpa 1	Lekh Nath Acharya	Nepali Congress
Rolpa 2	Surendra Hamal	Nepali Congress
Pyuthan 1	Hari Acharya	Rastriya Janamorcha
Pyuthan 2	Nava Raj Subedi	Rastriya Janamorcha
Salyan 1	Prakash Jwala	CPN (UML)
Salyan 2	Netra Lal Shrestha	Rastriya Prajatantra Party
Dang Deukhuri 1	Khum Bahadur Khadka	Nepali Congress
Dang Deukhuri 2	Bal Dev Sharma	Nepali Congress
Dang Deukhuri 3	Krishna Kishor Ghimire	Nepali Congress
Dang Deukhuri 4	Gehendra Giri	Nepali Congress
Dolpa 1	Nar Bahadur Budhathoki	CPN (UML)
Mugu 1	Chandra Bahadur Shahi	CPN (UML)
Jumla 1	Devi Lal Thapa	CPN (UML)
Kalikot 1	Prem Bahadur Singh	CPN (UML)
Humla 1	Gorakh Bahadur Bogati	CPN (UML)
Jajarkot 1	Govinda Bikram Shah	Rastriya Prajatantra Party
Jajarkot 2	Ratna Prasad Sharma Neupane	CPN (UML)
Dailekh 1	Nar Bahadur Hamal	CPN (UML)
Dailekh 2	Shiv Raj Joshi	Nepali Congress
Surkhet 1	Purna Bahadur Khadka	Nepali Congress
Surkhet 2	Rhidya Ram Thani	Nepali Congress
Surkhet 3	Shiv Raj Joshi	Nepali Congress
Banke 1	Gyanu K.C.	Nepali Congress
Banke 2	Sushil Koirala	Nepali Congress
Banke 3	Kailash Nath Kasudhan	Nepali Congress
Bardiya 1	Kashi Paudel	Nepali Congress
Bardiya 2	Mangal Prasad Tharu	Nepali Congress
Bardiya 3	Khem Raj Bhatt	Nepali Congress
Bajura 1	Janak Raj Giri	Nepali Congress
Bajhang 1	Arjun Jang Bahadur Singh	Nepali Congress
Bajhang 2	Suresh Malla	Nepali Congress
Achham 1	Gobinda Bahadur Shah	Nepali Congress
Achham 2	Ram Bahadur Bista	Nepali Congress
Doti 1	Bhakta Bahadur Balayar	Nepali Congress
Doti 2	Siddha Raj Ojha	Nepali Congress
Kailali 1	Sushila Swar	Nepali Congress
Kailali 2	Ram Janam Chaudhary	Nepali Congress
Kailali 3	Pushkar Nath Oja	Nepali Congress
Kailali 4	Tek Bahadur Chokhyal	Nepali Congress
Dadeldhura 1	Sher Bahadur Deuba	Nepali Congress
Darchula 1	Dilendra Prasad Badu	Nepali Congress
Baitadi 1	Narendra Bahadur Bum	Nepali Congress
Baitadi 2	Binayadhoj Chand	Nepali Congress
Kanchanpur 1	Narayan Prakash Saud	Nepali Congress
Kanchanpur 2	Tarini Dutt Chataut	Nepali Congress
Kanchanpur 3	Ramesh Lekhak	Nepali Congress

== By-elections ==
Constituency	Incumbent	Party	Cause of vacation	Elected MP	Party	By-election
Jhapa 6	K. P. Sharma Oli	CPN (UML)	Elected from Jhapa 2	Gopal Prasad Koirala	Congress	1999
Morang 1	Girija Prasad Koirala	Congress	Elected from Sunsari 5	Amod Prasad Upadhyay	Congress	1999
Rautahat 4	Madhav Kumar Nepal	CPN (UML)	Elected from Rautahat 1	Prakash Koirala	Congress	1999
