= Fourth Girija Prasad Koirala cabinet =

Government in Nepal (2000–2001)

- Cabinet of Nepal
- March 2000–July 2001
- Date formed: 21 March 2000
- Date dissolved: 22 July 2001

People and organisations
- Monarch: King Birendra(2000-2001); King Dipendra(2001); King Gyanendra(2001-2008)
- Prime Minister: Girija Prasad Koirala
- Total no. of members: 40 appointments
- Member party: Nepali Congress
- Status in legislature: Majority
- Opposition party: CPN (UML)
- Opposition leaders: Madhav Kumar Nepal

History
- Election: 1999
- Legislature terms: 1999–2002
- Predecessor: K.P. Bhattarai cabinet
- Successor: Second Deuba cabinet

The fourth Girija Prasad Koirala cabinet was formed on 21 March 2000 after Nepali Congress leader Girija Prasad Koirala was appointed as the prime minister by King Birendra. After the His Majesty's Government (Division of Work) Regulations 2000 came into effect on 18 April 2000, the cabinet was reformed. The cabinet was reshuffled on 7 February 2001.

The cabinet was dissolved on 22 July 2001, after the resignation of Koirala three days prior. He was replaced by Sher Bahadur Deuba.

== Cabinet ==
=== March–April 2000 ===
Portfolio	Minister	Took office	Left office
Prime Minister of Nepal; Minister for Palace Affairs; Minister for Defence	Girija Prasad Koirala	21 March 2000	22 July 2001
Deputy Prime Minister	Ram Chandra Poudel	21 March 2000	13 July 2001
Minister for Local Development	Ram Chandra Poudel	21 March 2000	7 February 2001
Minister for Water Supply; Minister for Construction and Transportation	Khum Bahadur Khadka	21 March 2000	8 August 2000
Minister for Home Affairs	Govinda Raj Joshi	21 March 2000	29 September 2000
Minister for Foreign Affairs	Chakra Prasad Bastola	21 March 2000	22 July 2001
Minister for Law and Justice; Minister for Parliamentary Affairs	Mahantha Thakur	21 March 2000	22 July 2001
Minister for Land Reform and Management	Siddha Raj Ojha	21 March 2000	7 February 2001
Minister for Information and Communications	Jay Prakash Gupta	21 March 2000	7 February 2001
Minister for Health	Ram Baran Yadav	21 March 2000	7 February 2001
Minister for Finance	Mahesh Acharya	21 March 2000	22 July 2001
Minister for Industry; Minister for Commerce	Ram Krishna Tamrakar	21 March 2000	7 February 2001
Minister for Tourism and Civil Aviation	Tarinee Datt Chataut	21 March 2000	25 January 2001
Minister for Education	Amod Prasad Upadhyay	21 March 2000	22 July 2001
Minister for Science and Technology	Surendra Prasad Chaudhary	21 March 2000	22 July 2001
Ministers of State
Minister of State for Agriculture	Baldev Sharma Majgaiya	21 March 2000	7 February 2001
Minister of State for Population and Environment	Shiv Raj Joshi	21 March 2000	7 February 2001
Minister of State for Forests and Soil Conservation	Mohammad Aftab Alam	21 March 2000	31 July 2000
Minister of State for Water Supply	Ram Bahadur Gurung	21 March 2000	7 February 2001
Minister of State for Women and Social Welfare	Kamala Panta	21 March 2000	22 July 2001
Minister of State for Industry; Minister of State for Commerce	Narendra Bikram Nembang	21 March 2000	7 February 2001
Minister of State for Education	Dilendra Prasad Badu	21 March 2000	22 July 2001
Minister of State for Labour	Surendra Hamal	21 March 2000	22 July 2001
Minister of State for Land Reform and Management	Gopal Rai	21 March 2000	7 February 2001
Minister of State for Local Development	Suresh Malla	21 March 2000	7 February 2001
Minister of State for Health	Tirtha Ram Dangol	21 March 2000	22 July 2001

=== April 2000–February 2001 ===
Portfolio	Minister	Took office	Left office
Prime Minister of Nepal; Minister for Palace Affairs	Girija Prasad Koirala	21 March 2000	22 July 2001
Deputy Prime Minister	Ram Chandra Poudel	21 March 2000	13 July 2001
Minister for Local Development	Ram Chandra Poudel	21 March 2000	7 February 2001
Minister for Home Affairs	Ram Chandra Poudel	29 September 2000	13 July 2001
Minister for Water Supply; Minister for Physical Planning and Construction	Khum Bahadur Khadka	21 March 2000	8 August 2000
Minister for Home Affairs	Govinda Raj Joshi	21 March 2000	29 September 2000
Minister for Foreign Affairs	Chakra Prasad Bastola	21 March 2000	22 July 2001
Minister for Law, Justice and Parliamentary Affairs	Mahantha Thakur	21 March 2000	22 July 2001
Minister for Land Reform and Management	Siddha Raj Ojha	21 March 2000	7 February 2001
Minister for Information and Communications	Jay Prakash Gupta	21 March 2000	7 February 2001
Minister for Health	Ram Baran Yadav	21 March 2000	7 February 2001
Minister for Finance	Mahesh Acharya	21 March 2000	7 February 2001
Minister for Defence	Mahesh Acharya	2 October 2000	
Minister for Industry, Commerce and Supplies	Ram Krishna Tamrakar	21 March 2000	7 February 2001
Minister for Culture, Tourism and Civil Aviation	Ram Krishna Tamrakar	25 January 2001	7 February 2001
Minister for Culture, Tourism and Civil Aviation	Tarinee Datt Chataut	21 March 2000	25 January 2001
Minister for Education and Sports	Amod Prasad Upadhyay	21 March 2000	22 July 2001
Minister for Science and Technology	Surendra Prasad Chaudhary	21 March 2000	22 July 2001
Ministers of State
Minister of State for Agriculture and Cooperatives	Baldev Sharma Majgaiya	21 March 2000	7 February 2001
Minister of State for Population and Environment	Shiv Raj Joshi	21 March 2000	7 February 2001
Minister of State for Forests and Soil Conservation	Mohammad Aftab Alam	21 March 2000	31 July 2000
Minister of State for Water Supply	Ram Bahadur Gurung	21 March 2000	7 February 2001
Minister of State for Women, Children and Social Welfare	Kamala Panta	21 March 2000	22 July 2001
Minister of State for Industry, Commerce and Supplies	Narendra Bikram Nembang	21 March 2000	7 February 2001
Minister of State for Education and Sports	Dilendra Prasad Badu	21 March 2000	22 July 2001
Minister of State for Labour and Transportation Management	Surendra Hamal	21 March 2000	22 July 2001
Minister of State for Land Reform and Management	Gopal Rai	21 March 2000	7 February 2001
Minister of State for Local Development	Suresh Malla	21 March 2000	7 February 2001
Minister of State for Health	Tirtha Ram Dangol	21 March 2000	22 July 2001

=== February 2001 ===
Portfolio	Minister	Took office	Left office
Prime Minister of Nepal; Minister for Palace Affairs; Minister for General Administration	Girija Prasad Koirala	21 March 2000	22 July 2001
Deputy Prime Minister	Ram Chandra Poudel	21 March 2000	13 July 2001
Minister for Home Affairs	Ram Chandra Poudel	29 September 2000	13 July 2001
Minister for Physical Planning and Construction	Khum Bahadur Khadka	7 February 2001	13 February 2001
Minister for Local Development	Govinda Raj Joshi	7 February 2001	22 July 2001
Minister for Culture, Tourism and Civil Aviation	Govinda Raj Joshi	26 June 2001	22 July 2001
Minister for Foreign Affairs	Chakra Prasad Bastola	21 March 2000	22 July 2001
Minister for Agriculture and Cooperatives	Chakra Prasad Bastola	15 March 2001	22 July 2001
Minister for Home Affairs	Chakra Prasad Bastola	13 July 2001	22 July 2001
Minister for Finance	Ram Sharan Mahat	7 February 2001	22 July 2001
Minister for Law, Justice and Parliamentary Affairs	Mahantha Thakur	21 March 2000	22 July 2001
Minister for Physical Planning and Construction	Mahantha Thakur	13 February 2001	22 July 2001
Minister for Population and Environment	Siddha Raj Ojha	7 February 2001	22 July 2001
Minister for Culture, Tourism and Civil Aviation	Omkar Prasad Shrestha	7 February 2001	26 June 2001
Minister for Labour and Transportation Management	Palten Gurung	7 February 2001	22 July 2001
Minister for Agriculture and Cooperatives	Jay Prakash Gupta	7 February 2001	15 March 2001
Minister for Defence	Mahesh Acharya	2 October 2000	22 July 2001
Minister for Health	Ram Krishna Tamrakar	7 February 2001	22 July 2001
Minister for Education and Sports	Amod Prasad Upadhyay	21 March 2000	22 July 2001
Minister for Water Supply	Baldev Sharma Majgaiya	7 February 2001	1 May 2001
Minister for Science and Technology	Surendra Prasad Chaudhary	21 March 2000	22 July 2001
Minister for Information and Communications	Shiv Raj Joshi	7 February 2001	22 July 2001
Minister for Forests and Soil Conservation	Prakash Koirala	7 February 2001	22 July 2001
Ministers of State
Minister of State for Land Reform and Management	Mohammad Aftab Alam	7 February 2001	22 July 2001
Minister of State for Industry, Commerce and Supplies	Krishna Prasad Sitaula	7 February 2001	22 July 2001
Minister of State for Women, Children and Social Welfare	Kamala Panta	21 March 2000	22 July 2001
Minister of State for Agriculture and Cooperatives	Narendra Bikram Nembang	7 February 2001	22 July 2001
Minister of State for Education and Sports	Dilendra Prasad Badu	21 March 2000	22 July 2001
Minister of State for Labour and Transportation Management	Surendra Hamal	21 March 2000	15 March 2001
Minister of State for Finance	Gopal Rai	7 February 2001	22 July 2001
Minister of State for Physical Planning and Construction	Suresh Malla	21 March 2000	22 July 2001
Minister of State for Health	Tirtha Ram Dangol	21 March 2000	22 July 2001
Minister of State for Home Affairs	Hari Prasad Sapkota	7 February 2001	22 July 2001
Minister of State for Culture, Tourism and Civil Aviation	Mahadev Gurung	7 February 2001	22 July 2001
Minister of State for Water Supply	Benupraj Prasai	7 February 2001	22 July 2001
Minister of State for Information and Communications	Pushkar Ojha	7 February 2001	22 July 2001
Minister of State for Forests and Soil Conservation	Shiva Kumar Basnet	7 February 2001	22 July 2001
Assistant Ministers
Assistant Minister for Agriculture and Cooperatives	Ramhari Dangol	7 February 2001	22 July 2001
Assistant Minister for Local Development	Keshar Man Rokka	7 February 2001	22 July 2001
Assistant Minister for Foreign Affairs	Romy Gauchan	7 February 2001	22 July 2001
Assistant Minister for Industry, Commerce and Supplies	Mahendra Kumar Raya	7 February 2001	22 July 2001
Assistant Minister for Forests and Soil Conservation	Janak Raj Giri	7 February 2001	22 July 2001
