= Second Deuba cabinet =

Government of Nepal from 2001 to 2002

- Cabinet of Nepal
- July 2001–October 2002
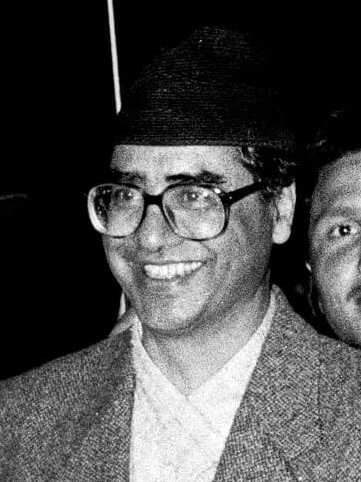
- Sher Bahadur Deuba
- Date formed: 26 July 2001
- Date dissolved: 4 October 2002

People and organisations
- Monarch: King Gyanendra
- Prime Minister: Sher Bahadur Deuba
- Total no. of members: 41 appointments
- Member party: Nepali Congress
- Status in legislature: Majority
- Opposition party: CPN (UML)
- Opposition leaders: Madhav Kumar Nepal

History
- Election: 1999
- Legislature terms: 1999–2002
- Predecessor: Fourth G.P. Koirala cabinet
- Successor: Fourth Chand cabinet

The second Deuba cabinet was formed on 26 July 2001 after Nepali Congress leader Sher Bahadur Deuba was appointed as prime minister by King Gyanendra. The cabinet was expanded on 18 October 2001.

Deuba was dismissed and the cabinet was dissolved on 4 October 2002 by King Gyanendra. He was replaced by Lokendra Bahadur Chand as prime minister.

== Cabinet ==
Portfolio	Minister	Took office	Left office
Prime Minister of Nepal; Minister for Palace Affairs; Minister for Foreign Affairs; Minister for Defence	Sher Bahadur Deuba	26 July 2001	4 October 2002
Minister for Physical Planning and Construction	Chiranjibi Wagle	26 July 2001	4 October 2002
Minister for Home Affairs; Minister for Local Development	Khum Bahadur Khadka	26 July 2001	4 October 2002
Minister for Forests and Soil Conservation	Gopal Man Shrestha	26 July 2001	11 March 2002
Minister for Finance	Ram Sharan Mahat	26 July 2001	24 May 2002
Minister for Water Supply	Bijay Kumar Gachhadar	26 July 2001	4 October 2002
Minister for Culture, Tourism and Civil Aviation	Bal Bahadur K.C.	26 July 2001	4 October 2002
Minister for Health	Sharat Singh Bhandari	26 July 2001	4 October 2002
Minister for Labour and Transportation Management	Palten Gurung	26 July 2001	4 October 2002
Minister for Industry, Commerce and Supplies	Purna Bahadur Khadka	18 October 2001	4 October 2002
Minister for Information and Communications	Jay Prakash Gupta	26 July 2001	4 October 2002
Minister for Agriculture and Cooperatives	Mahesh Acharya	26 July 2001	4 October 2002
Minister for Education and Sports	Amod Prasad Upadhyay	26 July 2001	24 May 2002
Minister for Population and Environment	Prem Lal Singh	26 July 2001	4 October 2002
Minister for the Office of the Prime Minister	Rishikesh Gautam	18 October 2001	4 October 2002
Minister for Women, Children and Social Welfare	Rajendra Kharel	18 October 2001	24 May 2002
Minister for General Administration	Khemraj Bhatta	18 October 2001	4 October 2002
Minister for Law, Justice and Parliamentary Affairs	Narendra Bikram Nembang	18 October 2001	4 October 2002
Ministers of State
Minister of State for Science and Technology	Bhakta Bahadur Balayar	18 October 2001	4 October 2002
Minister of State for Land Reform and Management	Ram Janam Chaudhary	18 October 2001	4 October 2002
Minister of State for Home Affairs	Devendra Raj Kandel	18 October 2001	4 October 2002
Minister of State for Local Development	Duryodhan Singh	18 October 2001	4 October 2002
Minister of State for Forests and Soil Conservation	Surendra Hamal	18 October 2001	11 March 2002
Minister of State for Labour and Transportation Management	Shiv Raj Joshi	18 October 2001	4 October 2002
Minister of State for Water Supply	Narayan Sharma Paudyal	18 October 2001	4 October 2002
Minister of State for Foreign Affairs	Arjun Jung Bahadur Singh	18 October 2001	4 October 2002
Minister of State for Agriculture and Cooperatives	Laxman Prasad Mahato	18 October 2001	4 October 2002
Minister of State for Women, Children and Social Welfare	Sushila Swar	18 October 2001	4 October 2002
Minister of State for Information and Communications	Hari Narayan Chaudhary	18 October 2001	4 October 2002
Minister of State for Education and Sports	Narayan Prakash Saud	18 October 2001	4 October 2002
Minister of State for Physical Planning and Construction	Keshav Thapa	18 October 2001	4 October 2002
Minister of State for Culture, Tourism and Civil Aviation	Sarbadhan Rai	18 October 2001	4 October 2002
Minister of State for Health	Mohan Bahadur Basnet	18 October 2001	4 October 2002
Minister of State for Finance	Bharat Kumar Shah	18 October 2001	4 October 2002
Assistant Ministers
Assistant Minister for Industry, Commerce and Supplies	Prakash Bahadur Gurung	18 October 2001	4 October 2002
Assistant Minister for Land Reform and Management	Dilli Raj Sharma	18 October 2001	4 October 2002
Assistant Minister for Law, Justice and Parliamentary Affairs	Nagendra Kumar Ray	18 October 2001	4 October 2002
Assistant Minister for Physical Planning and Construction	Sabitri Bogati	18 October 2001	4 October 2002
Assistant Minister for General Administration	Dil Bahadur Lama	18 October 2001	4 October 2002
Assistant Minister for Water Supply	Birendra Kumar Kanodia	18 October 2001	4 October 2002
Assistant Minister for Local Development	Ajaya Kumar Chaurasiya	18 October 2001	4 October 2002
