= Krishna Prasad Bhattarai cabinet =

Government of Nepal from 1999 to 2000

- Cabinet of Nepal
- May 1999–March 2000
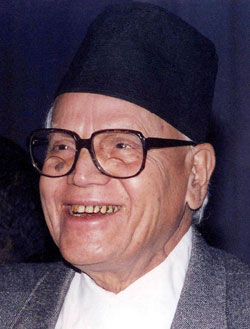
- Krishna Prasad Bhattarai
- Date formed: 31 May 1999
- Date dissolved: 20 March 2000

People and organisations
- Monarch: King Birendra
- Prime Minister: Krishna Prasad Bhattarai
- Total no. of members: 33 appointments
- Member party: Nepali Congress
- Status in legislature: Majority
- Opposition party: CPN (UML)
- Opposition leaders: Madhav Kumar Nepal

History
- Election: 1999
- Legislature terms: 1999–2002
- Predecessor: Third G.P. Koirala cabinet
- Successor: Fourth G.P. Koirala cabinet

The Krishna Prasad Bhattarai cabinet was formed on 31 May 1999 after Nepali Congress leader Krishna Prasad Bhattarai was appointed as the prime minister by King Birendra following the 1999 election. The cabinet was reshuffled on 30 June 1999.

After Bhattarai was removed as parliamentary party leader by the Nepali Congress he resigned and was replaced by Girija Prasad Koirala on 20 March 2000.

== Cabinet ==
=== May–June 1999 ===
Portfolio	Minister	Took office	Left office
Prime Minister of Nepal; Minister for Palace Affairs; Minister for Defence; Minister for Home Affairs; Minister for Foreign Affairs; Minister for Women and Social Welfare	Krishna Prasad Bhattarai	31 May 1999	20 March 2000
Minister for Education	Yog Prasad Upadhaya	31 May 1999	20 March 2000
Minister for Law and Justice; Minister for Parliamentary Affairs	Taranath Ranabhat	31 May 1999	20 June 1999
Minister for Land Reform and Management Minister for Commerce	Chiranjibi Wagle	31 May 1999	30 June 1999
Minister for Housing and Physical Planning; Minister for Local Development	Khum Bahadur Khadka	31 May 1999	30 June 1999
Minister for Water Supply	Govinda Raj Joshi	31 May 1999	20 March 2000
Minister for Agriculture	Chakra Prasad Bastola	31 May 1999	20 March 2000
Minister for Tourism and Civil Aviation	Bijay Kumar Gachhadar	31 May 1999	20 March 2000
Minister for General Administration	Bal Bahadur K.C.	31 May 1999	30 June 1999
Minister for Labour	Bal Bahadur K.C.	31 May 1999	20 March 2000
Minister for Supplies	Prakash Man Singh	31 May 1999	20 March 2000
Minister for Youth, Sports and Culture	Sharat Singh Bhandari	31 May 1999	20 March 2000
Minister for Forests and Soil Conservation	Mahantha Thakur	31 May 1999	20 March 2000
Minister for Population and Environment; Minister for Science and Technology; Minister for Construction and Transportation	Omkar Prasad Shrestha	31 May 1999	30 June 1999
Minister for Law and Justice; Minister for Parliamentary Affairs	Omkar Prasad Shrestha	22 June 1999	30 June 1999
Minister for Information and Communications	Purna Bahadur Khadka	31 May 1999	20 March 2000
Minister for Industry	Purna Bahadur Khadka	31 May 1999	30 June 1999
Minister for Health	Ram Baran Yadav	31 May 1999	20 March 2000
Minister for Finance	Mahesh Acharya	31 May 1999	20 March 2000

=== June 1999 ===
Portfolio	Minister	Took office	Left office
Prime Minister of Nepal; Minister for Palace Affairs; Minister for Defence	Krishna Prasad Bhattarai	31 May 1999	20 March 2000
Minister for Education	Yog Prasad Upadhaya	31 May 1999	20 March 2000
Minister for Local Development; Minister for Women and Social Welfare	Chiranjibi Wagle	30 June 1999	20 March 2000
Minister for Construction and Transportation	Khum Bahadur Khadka	30 June 1999	20 March 2000
Minister for Water Supply	Govinda Raj Joshi	31 May 1999	20 March 2000
Minister for Agriculture	Chakra Prasad Bastola	31 May 1999	20 March 2000
Minister for Foreign Affairs	Ram Sharan Mahat	30 June 1999	20 March 2000
Minister for Tourism and Civil Aviation	Bijay Kumar Gachhadar	31 May 1999	20 March 2000
Minister for Housing and Physical Planning	Bal Bahadur K.C.	30 June 1999	20 March 2000
Minister for Labour	Bal Bahadur K.C.	31 May 1999	20 March 2000
Minister for Supplies	Prakash Man Singh	31 May 1999	20 March 2000
Minister for Youth, Sports and Culture	Sharat Singh Bhandari	31 May 1999	20 March 2000
Minister for Forests and Soil Conservation	Mahantha Thakur	31 May 1999	20 March 2000
Minister for General Administration	Siddha Raj Ojha	30 June 1999	20 March 2000
Minister for Industry	Omkar Prasad Shrestha	30 June 1999	20 March 2000
Minister for Home Affairs	Purna Bahadur Khadka	30 June 1999	20 March 2000
Minister for Information and Communications	Purna Bahadur Khadka	31 May 1999	20 March 2000
Minister for Health	Ram Baran Yadav	31 May 1999	20 March 2000
Minister for Finance	Mahesh Acharya	31 May 1999	20 March 2000
Minister for Commerce	Ram Krishna Tamrakar	30 June 1999	20 March 2000
Minister for Law and Justice; Minister for Parliamentary Affairs	Tarinee Datt Chataut	30 June 1999	20 March 2000
Ministers of State
Minister of State for Science and Technology	Surendra Prasad Chaudhary	30 June 1999	20 March 2000
Minister of State for Labour	Ram Bahadur Gurung	30 June 1999	20 March 2000
Minister of State for Population and Environment	Bhakta Bahadur Balayar	30 June 1999	20 March 2000
Minister of State for Local Development	Mohammad Aftab Alam	30 June 1999	20 March 2000
Minister of State for Women and Social Welfare	Kamala Panta	30 June 1999	20 March 2000
Minister of State for Education	Rajendra Kharel	30 June 1999	20 March 2000
Minister of State for Land Reform and Management	Gangadhar Lamsal	30 June 1999	20 March 2000
Minister of State for Information and Communications	Gobinda Bahadur Shah	30 June 1999	20 March 2000
Assistant Ministers
Assistant Minister for Land Reform and Management	Surendra Hamal	30 June 1999	20 March 2000
Assistant Minister for Foreign Affairs	Arjun Jang Bahadur Singh	30 June 1999	20 March 2000
Assistant Minister for Commerce	Narendra Bikram Nembang	30 June 1999	20 March 2000
Assistant Minister for Industry	Sarbadhan Rai	30 June 1999	20 March 2000
Assistant Minister for Tourism and Civil Aviation	Narayan Singh Pun	30 June 1999	20 March 2000
