= Speaker of the House of Representatives (Nepal) =

Presiding member of the lower house of the Parliament of Nepal

- प्रतिनिधि सभा सभामुख
- Emblem of Nepal

- Flag of Nepal

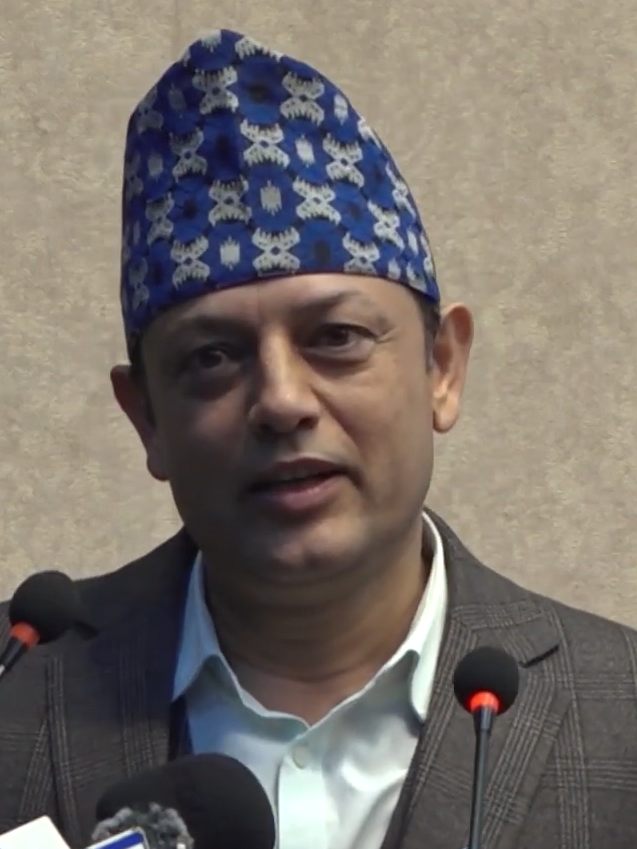
- Incumbent; Dol Prasad Aryal since 5 April 2026
- House of Representatives
- Style: The Right Honourable
- Status: Presiding officer
- Member of: Constitutional Council
- Seat: Federal Parliament Building, Singha Durbar, Kathmandu
- Nominator: Parliamentary party
- Appointer: Elected by House of Representatives
- Term length: At the House's pleasure; elected at the beginning of the new Federal Parliament by a majority of the representatives, and upon a vacancy during Parliament.
- Constituting instrument: Article 91 of the Constitution of Nepal
- Formation: 1959; 67 years ago
- First holder: Krishna Prasad Bhattarai (1959)
- Deputy: Deputy Speaker
- Salary: रू 67,320
- Website: hr.parliament.gov.np

The speaker of the House of Representatives in Nepal is the presiding officer of the lower house of the Federal Parliament of Nepal, the House of Representatives. The position of Speaker holds significant importance in the legislative process, presiding over the proceedings, maintaining order, and ensuring fair debate and discussion. The current Speaker of the House of Representatives of Nepal is Dol Prasad Aryal since 5 April 2026.

== Removal ==
The post of Speaker is vacated:-

(a) if he or she ceases to be a member of the House of Representatives (Nepal), provided that, in the event of dissolution of the House of Representatives (Nepal), the Speaker and the Deputy Speaker of the House of Representatives (Nepal) holding their respective offices shall continue in office until the previous day of the filing of nominations for another election to the House of Representatives (Nepal),

(b) if he or she tenders resignation in writing,

(c) if a resolution is passed by a majority of two-thirds of the total number of the then members of the House of Representatives (Nepal) that his or her conduct is not compatible with his or her office.

== List of speakers ==
=== House of Representatives of the Parliament of the Kingdom of Nepal, 1959–1960 ===
Portrait	Name Constituency (Birth–Death)	Term	House	Party	Ref
	Krishna Prasad Bhattarai (1924–2011)	3 July 1959 – 15 December 1960	1st	Nepali Congress	

=== House of Representatives of the Parliament of the Kingdom of Nepal, 1991–2007 ===
Portrait	Name Constituency (Birth–Death)	Term	House	Party	Ref
	Daman Nath Dhungana; MP for Kathmandu 2 (1942–2024)	23 June 1991 – 1 October 1994	2nd	Nepali Congress	
	Ram Chandra Paudel; MP for Tanahu 2 (1944–)	18 December 1994 – 23 March 1999	3rd	Nepali Congress	
	Taranath Ranabhat; MP for Kaski 1	23 June 1999 – 28 April 2006	4th	Nepali Congress	
	Subas Chandra Nemwang; MP for Ilam 2 (1953–2023)	13 May 2006 – 15 January 2007	4th	CPN (UML)	

=== House of Representatives of the Federal Parliament of Nepal, since 2017 ===
Portrait	Name Constituency (Birth–Death)	Term	House	Party	Ref
	Krishna Bahadur Mahara; MP for Dang 2 (1958–)	10 March 2018 – 1 October 2019	5th	CPN (Maoist Centre)	
	Agni Prasad Sapkota; MP for Sindhupalchok 1 (1958–)	26 January 2020 – 18 September 2022	5th	CPN (Maoist Centre)	
	Dev Raj Ghimire; MP for Jhapa 2 (1956–)	19 January 2023 – 19 January 2026	6th	CPN (UML)	
	Dol Prasad Aryal; MP for Kathmandu 9 (1974–)	5 April 2026 – Incumbent	7th	Rastriya Swatantra Party	

== List of deputy speakers ==
Name Constituency (Birth–Death)	Term	House	Party	Ref
Mahendra Narayan Nidhi; MP for Janakpur	31 March 1960 – 15 December 1960	1st	Nepali Congress	
Mahantha Thakur; MP for Sarlahi 5	23 June 1991 – 17 December 1994	2nd	Nepali Congress	
Ram Vilas Yadav; MP for Mahottari 3	18 December 1994 – 13 October 1997	3rd	Rastriya Prajatantra Party	
Lila Shrestha Subba; MP for Sunsari 1	6 May 1998 – 10 October 1998	3rd	CPN (UML)	
Bhojraj Joshi; MP for Kanchanpur 2	14 October 1998 – 23 March 1999	3rd	CPN (UML)	
Chitra Lekha Yadav; MP for Siraha 2	29 June 1999 – 17 January 2007	4th	Nepali Congress	
Shiva Maya Tumbahamphe; Party list MP	18 March 2018 – 20 January 2020	5th	CPN (UML)	
Pushpa Bhusal; Party list MP	15 July 2022 – 18 September 2022	5th	Nepali Congress	
Indira Ranamagar; Party list MP	21 January 2023 – 28 December 2025	6th	Rastriya Swatantra Party	
Ruby Kumari Thakur; Party list MP	10 April 2026 – Incumbent	7th	Shram Sanskriti Party	
