= Ram Krishna =

Ram Krishna may refer to:

- Ram Krishna (politician), Indian politician from the state of the Madhya Pradesh
- Ram Krishna Dhakal (born 1974), pop and playback singer, actor and reality show judge from Nepal
- Ram Krishna Tamrakar, Nepalese politician
