= Sushila Swar =

Nepali politician

- सुशीला स्वाँर

Minister of State for Women, Children and Senior Citizens
- In office 18 October 2001 – 4 October 2002
- Prime Minister: Sher Bahadur Deuba
- Preceded by: Kamala Panta
- Succeeded by: Anuradha Koirala

Member of Parliament, Pratinidhi Sabha
- In office 15 January 2007 – 18 January 2008
- Prime Minister: Girija Prasad Koirala
- Constituency: Kailali 1
- In office 31 May 1999 – 21 May 2002
- Prime Minister: Krishna Prasad Bhattarai, Girija Prasad Koirala, Sher Bahadur Deuba
- Preceded by: Himanchal Raj Bhattarai
- Succeeded by: Rupa Chaudhary (as Member of the Constituent Assembly)
- Constituency: Kailali 1

Personal details
- Born: 1954 (age 71–72)
- Citizenship: Nepali
- Party: Nepali Congress
- Parents: Ganesh Bahadur Swar (father); Bindra Devi Swar (mother)

Sushila Swar (Nepali: सुशीला स्वाँर) is a Nepali politician affiliated with the Nepali Congress. She was elected to the House of Representatives from the Kailali 1 constituency in the 1999 general election.

She served as Minister of State for Women, Children and Senior Citizens between 2001 and 2002 under Sher Bahadur Deuba in his second cabinet.

When the Nepali Congress was divided, she sided with the Nepali Congress (Democratic)
