= Rajendra Kharel =

Nepali politician (1946–2026)

- राजेन्द्र खरेल
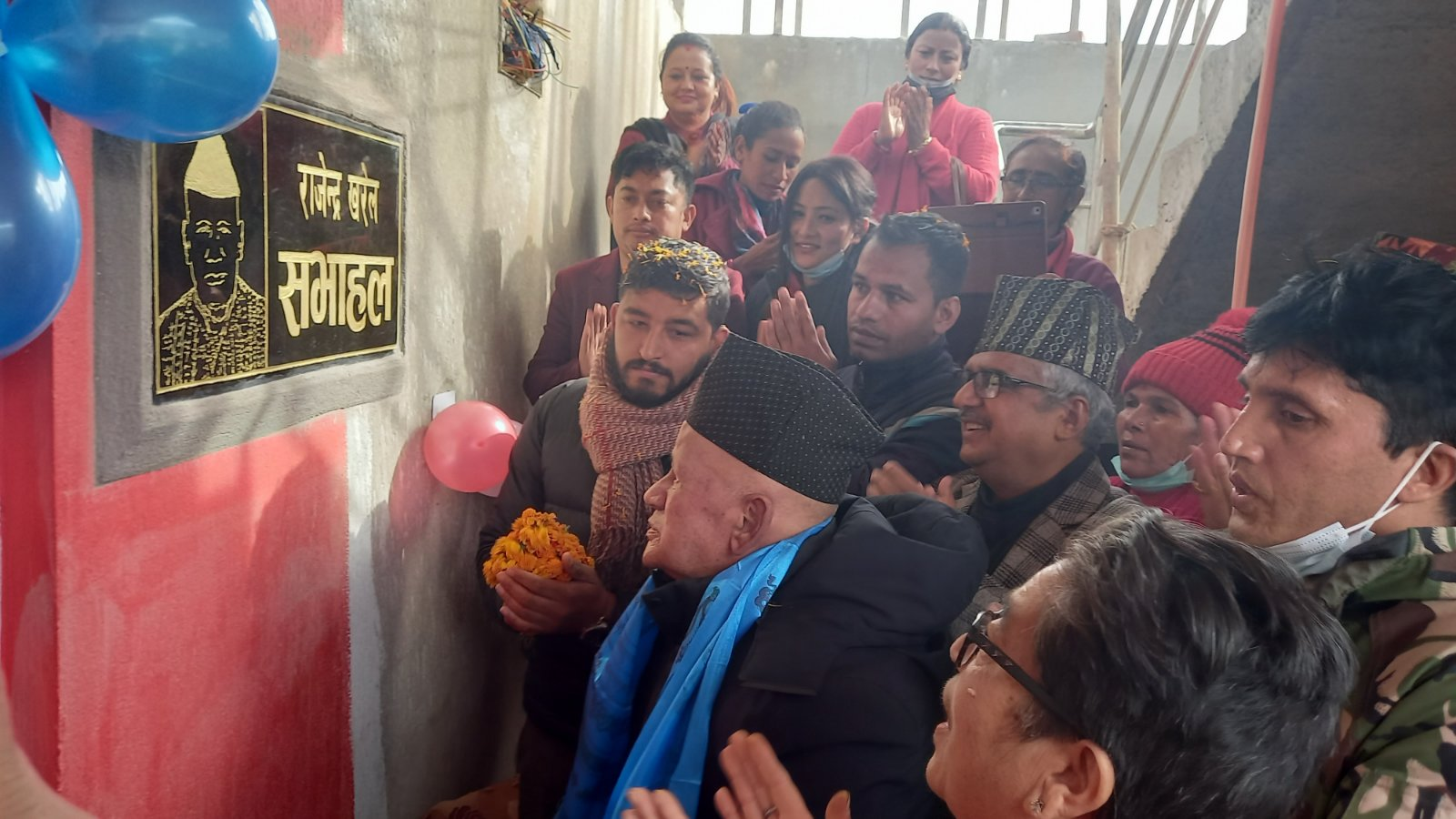
- Kharel inaugurating a Meeting Hall named after him in Kavrepalanchok, 2021

Minister of Women, Children and Social Welfare
- In office 18 October 2001 – 24 May 2002
- Monarch: King Birendra
- Prime Minister: Sher Bahadur Deuba
- Succeeded by: Gore Bahadur Khapangi

Minister of State for Education
- In office 30 June 1999 – 20 March 2000
- Monarch: King Birendra
- Prime Minister: Krishna Prasad Bhattarai
- Minister: Yog Prasad Upadhaya
- Succeeded by: Dilendra Prasad Badu

Member of Parliament, Pratinidhi Sabha
- In office 15 January 2007 – 18 January 2008
- Prime Minister: Girija Prasad Koirala
- Preceded by: himself
- Succeeded by: Krishna Prasad Sapkota (as Member of the Constituent Assembly)
- Constituency: Kavre 3 (abolished 2017)
- In office 31 May 1999 – 21 May 2002
- Prime Minister: Krishna Prasad Bhattarai, Girija Prasad Koirala, Sher Bahadur Deuba
- Preceded by: Govinda Nath Upreti
- Constituency: Kavre 3

Personal details
- Born: 23 July 1946 Kharelthok, Kavrepalanchok District, Nepal
- Died: 21 June 2026 (aged 79) Baneshwor, Kathmandu, Nepal
- Citizenship: Nepali
- Party: Nepali Congress (before 2002; 2007–2026)
- Other political affiliations: Nepali Congress (Democratic) (2002–2007)
- Children: Mahesh Kharel
- Parents: Devi Prasad Kharel (father); Mukunda Kumari Kharel (mother)

Rajendra Kharel (Nepali: राजेन्द्र खरेल; 23 July 1946 – 21 June 2026) was a Nepali politician and long-time member of the Nepali Congress. He was elected to the Pratinidhi Sabha in the 1999 Nepalese legislative election and served as Minister of State for Education under Prime Minister Krishna Prasad Bhattarai from 30 June 1999 to 20 March 2000, and subsequently as Minister for Women, Children and Social Welfare in the Second Deuba cabinet under Sher Bahadur Deuba.

== Early life and activism ==
Kharel began community and civic activities in his early teens in Baneshwor, Kathmandu, including helping establish the Four Leaf (Charpat) Club, an educational and public-health initiative. He later joined the Yuwa Parichaya Goshthi (Youth Introduction Seminar), organized by Daman Nath Dhungana to promote democratic awareness during the Panchayat period. He also helped found the Ratna Library and was involved in local civic organizing in Baneshwor. Before the founding of the Nepal Student Union, he served as general secretary of an independent democratic student organization at National College (now Shanker Dev Campus), where economist Bishwambhar Pyakuryal was president.

== Political career ==
Kharel was active in Nepal's pro-democracy movement from the Panchayat era onward and was associated with senior Nepali Congress figures, including B. P. Koirala, Krishna Prasad Bhattarai, and Ganesh Man Singh., He was arrested multiple times for participating in pro-democracy activities and was active during the 1980 national referendum, the 1985–86 civil disobedience campaign, the 1990 People's Movement, and the 2006 People's Movement. After the success of the 1990 movement, he helped organize the victory gathering at Khula Manch in Kathmandu.

Kharel was among Bhattarai's closest political associates, and the Nepali Congress central office reportedly operated from Kharel's Baneshwor residence during Bhattarai's tenure as party president. Kharel later aligned with the Nepali Congress (Democratic) faction led by Sher Bahadur Deuba following the party's early-2000s split.

== Parliamentary and ministerial career ==
Kharel contested parliamentary elections from Kavrepalanchok constituencies in 1991, 1994, 1999, and the 2008 Constituent Assembly election, winning only in 1999. As MP for Kavrepalanchok-3, elected in the 1999 legislative election, he was appointed Minister of State for Education in the Krishna Prasad Bhattarai cabinet on 30 June 1999, serving until the cabinet's dissolution on 20 March 2000. He later served as Minister for Women, Children and Social Welfare (18 October 2001 – 24 May 2002) under Prime Minister Sher Bahadur Deuba. He also served in the interim Pratinidhi Sabha from January 2007 to January 2008.

== Death ==
Kharel died on 21 June 2026 at around 9:45 p.m. while undergoing treatment at Frontline Hospital in Baneshwor, Kathmandu. He was 80. Kharel had been receiving treatment for complications related to asthma. His death was announced by his son, Mahesh Kharel, the mayor of Panchkhal Municipality.

== Electoral history ==
1991 Pratinidhi Sabha Election Kavre - 4
(constituency abolished 2017)

‡	The available election source reports vote totals only for the two leading candidates. The remaining candidates - Bela Prasad Shrestha (Rastriya Prajatantra Party (Thapa)), Pitambar Upadhyaya (Rastriya Prajatantra Party (Chand)), Dhan B. Lama (Rastriya Janamorcha), Bhakti Nath Luitel (Janata Dal), and Basanta Kharel (Communist Party)—collectively received 6,167 votes (17.43% of valid votes), but their individual vote totals were not published.

Candidate	Party	Votes	%
Govinda Nath Upreti	CPN (UML)	20,808	58.82
Rajendra Kharel	Nepali Congress]	8,401	23.75
Others ^{‡}		6,167	17.43
Total		35,376	100.00
Majority		12,407	
CPN (UML) gain			

1994 Pratinidhi Sabha Election Kavre - 3
(constituency abolished 2017)

Candidate	Party	Votes	%
Govinda Nath Upreti	CPN (UML)	16,566	53.26
Rajendra Kharel	Nepali Congress	14,538	46.74
Total		31,104	100.00
Majority		2,028	
CPN (UML) gain			

1999 Pratinidhi Sabha Election Kavre - 3

Candidate	Party	Votes	%
Rajendra Kharel	Nepali Congress	18,925	34.28
Bidur Prasad Sapkota	CPN (UML)	18,404	33.34
Govinda Nath Upreti	CPN (ML)	11,609	21.03
Gopal Sedhai	Rastriya Prajatantra Party	5,332	9.66
Bir Bahadur Yonjan	Rastriya Prajatantra Party (Chand)	466	0.84
Hasta Bahadur Tamang	N.J. Party Rastriya Sambriddibad	349	0.63
Rama Thakuri	Rastriya Janata Parishad	59	0.11
Buddha Kaji Manandhar	Nepal Workers and Peasants Party	57	0.10
Total		55,201	100.00
Valid votes		55,201	96.85
Invalid/blank votes		1,795	3.15
Total votes		56,996	100.00
Registered voters/turnout		86,221	66.10
Majority		521	
Nepali Congress gain			

2008 Constituent Assembly Election Kavre - 4

Candidate	Party	Votes	%
Tej Bahadur Mijar	Communist Party of Nepal (Maoist Centre)	22,076	41.53
Bidur Prasad Sapkota	CPN (UML)	16,549	31.13
Rajendra Kharel	Nepali Congress	8,418	15.84
Govinda Nath Upreti	Independent	2,217	4.17
Ashwini Kumar Debaju	Janamorcha Nepal	1,104	2.08
Dr. Bharat Prasad Lamichhane	Communist Party of Nepal (Unified)	682	1.28
Shambhu Bahadur Bajagain	Rastriya Prajatantra Party	607	1.14
Chandra Lal Tusuju Shrestha	Nepal Workers Peasants Party	369	0.69
Bhupendra Dhungana	Nepali Janata Dal	330	0.62
Mahendra Jung Tamang	Tamsaling Nepal Rastriya Dal	323	0.61
Krishnabir Lama	Rastriya Janshakti Party	184	0.35
Bir Bahadur Yonjan	Rastriya Prajatantra Party Nepal	109	0.21
Harkajit Lama (Tamang)	Independent	94	0.18
Madhav Thapaliya	Independent	79	0.15
Laxmi Maya Baidhya	Nepal Samata Party	18	0.03
Total		53,159	100.00
Valid votes		53,159	95.78
Invalid/blank votes		2,342	4.22
Total votes		55,501	100.00
Registered voters/turnout		86,502	64.16
Majority		5,527	
Communist Party of Nepal (Maoist Centre) gain			

== Comparative table of elections ==
Elections	Parliament of Nepal	Constituency	Political party	Result	Vote percentage	Opposition		
Elections	Parliament of Nepal	Constituency	Political party	Result	Vote percentage	Candidate	Political party	Vote percentage
1991	2nd	Kavrepalanchok 4	NC	Lost	23.75% 8,401	Govinda Nath Upreti	CPN(UML)	58.82% 20,808
1994	3rd	Kavrepalanchok 3	NC	Lost	46.74% 14,538	Govinda Nath Upreti	CPN(UML)	53.26% 16,566
1999	4th	Kavrepalanchok 3	NC	Won	34.28% 18,925	Bidur Prasad Sapkota	CPN(UML)	33.34% 18,404
2008	1st CA	Kavrepalanchok 4	NC	Lost	17.89% 8,418	Tej Bahadur Mijar	UCPN (Maoist)	46.93% 22,076
