= Legislatures of Kingdom of Nepal =

Kingdom of Nepal (1768 - 2008), first time introduced legislature in 1948. Rana Prime Minister Padma Shumsher Jang Bahadur Rana forms Constitution Reform Committee to draft first constitution of Nepal in 1947 and Government of Nepal Act, 1948 passed in 1948. However, Mohan Shumsher Jang Bahadur Rana suspended the promulgation of the Constitution.

In 1950, Mohan Shumsher Jang Bahadur Rana himself promulgates the Government of Nepal Act, 1948 which was suspended by him in 1948.

On January 15, 2007 a new legislature promulgated The interim constitution of Nepal, 2007 which declared Nepal a democratic country and abolished Kingdom.

== Timeline ==
- 1948 Government of Nepal Act, 1948
- 1951 Interim Government of Nepal Act, 1951
- 1959 The Constitution of the Kingdom of Nepal, 1959
- 1962 The Constitution of Nepal, 1962
- 1990 The Constitution of the Kingdom of Nepal 1990
- 2007-2008 The interim constitution of Nepal, 2007
