= Tek Bahadur Chokhyal =

Nepali politician

Tek Bahadur Chokhal

Personal details
- Party: Nepali Congress

Tek Bahadur Chokhal (Nepali: टेकबहादुर चोख्याल) is a Nepalese politician and a leader of Nepali Congress. He was elected to the Pratinidhi Sabha in the 1999 election on behalf of the Nepali Congress. He joined the Nepali Congress (Democratic) during the split in the party.

Chokhal was the NC candidate in the Kailali-6 constituency for the 2008 Constituent Assembly election.

Chokhal was the law minister in a cabinet led by Sher Bahadur Deuba in 2002. He was elected as Member of House of Representatives twice. He also became a whip and a chief whip of NC parliamentary party.

Nepali Congress leader, and former minister, Tek Bahadur Chokhal died in Kathmandu on 13 November 2009. Chokhal's death was attributed to excessive bleeding from his nose, although he had previously reported problems with both his lungs and liver.

He is survived by his wife, two sons and a daughter.
