= Hari Lal Joshi =

Nepalese politician

Personal details
- Party: Nepali Congress

Hari Lal Joshi (Nepali: हरीलाल जोशी) is a Nepalese politician. He was elected to the Pratinidhi Sabha in the 1999 election on behalf of the Nepali Congress. He later left the party and joined Nepali Congress (Democratic)
