= Ram Chandra Tiwari =

Nepalese politician

Ram Chandra Tiwari is a Nepalese politician. He was elected to the Pratinidhi Sabha in the 1999 election on behalf of the Nepali Congress.
