= Kaski 1 =

Parliamentary constituency in Nepal

- Parliamentary constituency for the House of Representatives
- Kaski 1 in Gandaki Province

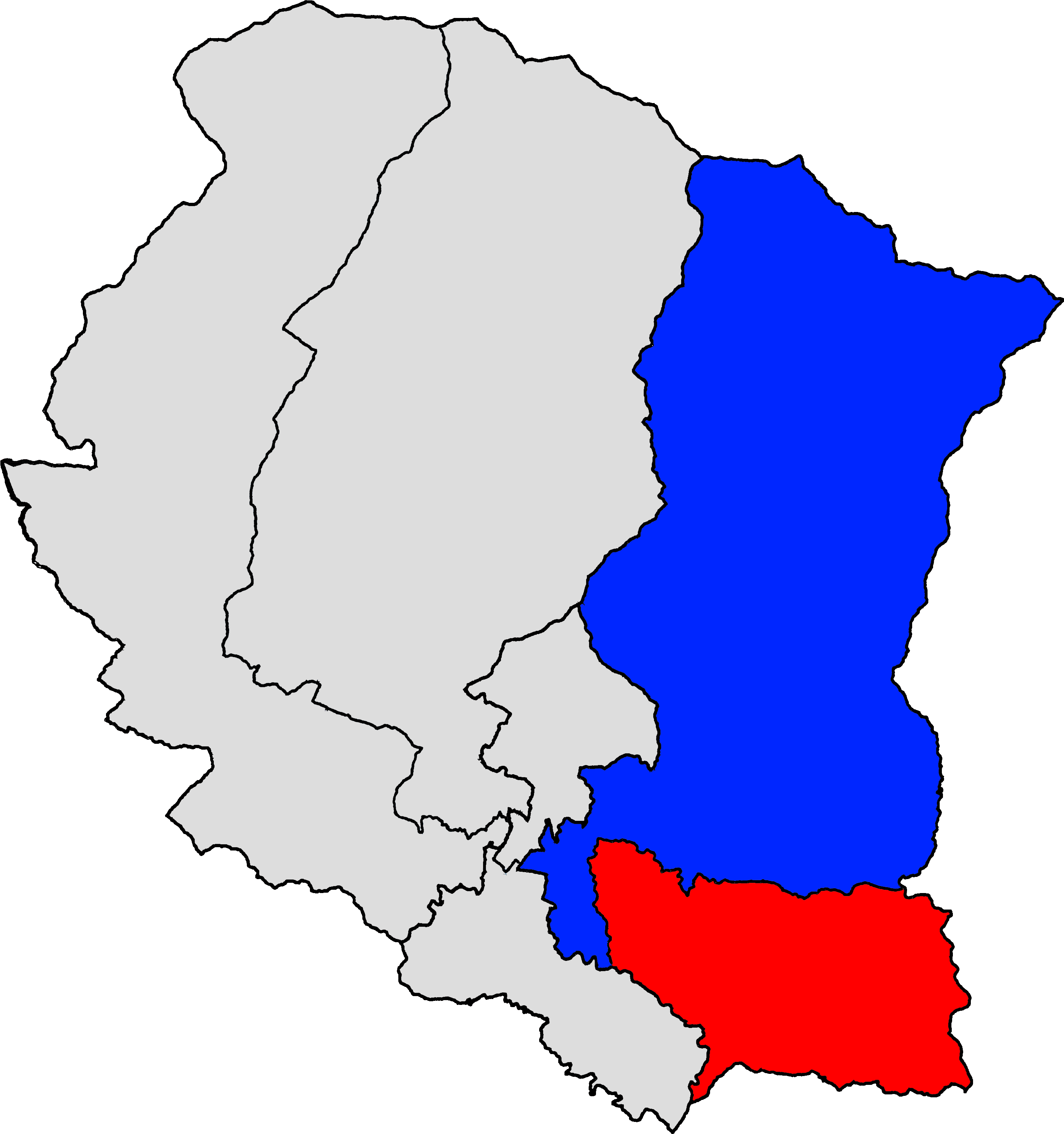
- Assembly segments Kaski 1(A) and Kaski 1(B) within Kaski District
- Province: Gandaki Province
- District: Kaski District
- Electorate: 96,084

Current constituency
- Created: 1991
- MP: Khadak Raj Poudel Rastriya Swatantra Party
- Gandaki MPA 1(A): Dipak Koirala (NCP)
- Gandaki MPA 1(B): Man Bahadur Gurung (NCP)

Kaski 1 is one of three parliamentary constituencies of Kaski District in Nepal. This constituency came into existence on the Constituency Delimitation Commission (CDC) report submitted on 31 August 2017.

== Incorporated areas ==
Kaski 1 incorporates Rupa Rural Municipality, Madi Rural Municipality and wards 10, 12–14 and 27–32 of Pokhara Metropolitan City.

== Assembly segments ==
It encompasses the following Gandaki Provincial Assembly segment

- Kaski 1(A)
- Kaski 1(B)

== Members of Parliament ==
=== Parliament/Constituent Assembly ===
Election	Member	Party
1991	Tara Nath Ranabhat	Nepali Congress
1994	Khag Raj Adhikari	CPN (Unified Marxist–Leninist)
1999	Tara Nath Ranabhat	Nepali Congress
2008	Dev Prasad Gurung	CPN (Maoist)
January 2009	Dev Prasad Gurung	UCPN (Maoist)
2009 by-election	Krishna Bahadur Gurung	UCPN (Maoist)
2013	Yagya Bahadur Thapa	Nepali Congress
2017	Khag Raj Adhikari	CPN (Unified Marxist–Leninist)
May 2018	Khag Raj Adhikari	Nepal Communist Party
March 2021	Khag Raj Adhikari	CPN (Unified Marxist–Leninist)
2022	Man Bahadur Gurung	CPN (Unified Marxist–Leninist)

=== Provincial Assembly ===
==== 1(A) ====
Election	Member	Party
2017	Dipak Koirala	CPN (Maoist Centre)
May 2018	Dipak Koirala	Nepal Communist Party

==== 1(B) ====
Election	Member	Party
2017	Man Bahadur Gurung	CPN (Unified Marxist-Leninist)
May 2018	Man Bahadur Gurung	Nepal Communist Party

== Election results ==
=== Election in the 2020s ===
==== 2022 general election ====
Candidate	Party	Votes	%
Man Bahadur Gurung	CPN (UML)	25,708	39.47
Kishore Dutt Baral	Nepali Congress	23,189	35.60
Raju Rai	Rastriya Swatantra Party	10,941	16.80
Surta Bahadur Gurung	Rastriya Prajatantra Party	3,008	4.62
Pramod Acharya	Hamro Nepali Party	1,029	1.58
Others		1,262	1.94
Total		65,137	100.00
Majority		2,519	
CPN (UML) hold			

==== 2022 provincial election ====
===== 1(A) =====
Candidate	Party	Votes	%
Khagaraj Adhikari	CPN (UML)	15,623	44.00
Dipak Koirala	CPN (Maoist Centre)	11,627	32.74
Madan Bahadur K.C.	Hamro Nepali Party	3,629	10.22
Baburam Thapa	Rastriya Prajatantra Party	3,534	9.95
Others	1,095	3.08	
Total		35,508	100.00
Majority		3,996	
CPN (UML)			

===== 1(B) =====
Candidate	Party	Votes	%
Bed Bahadur Gurung	CPN (UML)	12,661	41.40
Dipak Gurung	Nepali Congress	11,794	38.57
Mahendra Bahadur Karki	Rastriya Prajatantra Party	3,656	11.96
Mahesh Shrestha	Hamro Nepali Party	1,549	5.07
Others	921	3.01	
Total		30,581	100.00
Majority		867	
CPN (UML)			

=== Election in the 2010s ===
==== 2017 legislative elections ====
Party	Candidate	Votes
CPN (Unified Marxist–Leninist)	Khag Raj Adhikari	39,242
Nepali Congress	Yagya Bahadur Thapa	25,826
Others		2,418
Invalid votes		1,612
Result	CPN (UML) gain	
Source: Election Commission

==== 2017 Nepalese provincial elections ====
===== 1(A) =====
Party	Candidate	Votes
Communist Party of Nepal (Maoist Centre)	Dipak Koirala	18,727
Nepali Congress	Jiwan Pariyar	15,081
Others		2,462
Invalid votes		632
Result	Maoist Centre gain	
Source: Election Commission

===== 1(B) =====
Party	Candidate	Votes
CPN (Unified Marxist–Leninist)	Man Bahadur Gurung	17,249
Nepali Congress	Krishna Bahadur K.C.	13,102
Others		1,173
Invalid votes		661
Result	CPN (UML) gain	
Source: Election Commission

==== 2013 Constituent Assembly election ====
Party	Candidate	Votes
Nepali Congress	Yagya Bahadur Thapa	15,832
CPN (Unified Marxist–Leninist)	Man Bahadur G.C.	15,560
UCPN (Maoist)	Bishnu Paudel	6,475
Others		2,807
Result	Congress gain	
Source: NepalNews

=== Election in the 2000s ===
==== 2009 by-elections ====
Candidate	Party	Votes	%
Krishna Bahadur Gurung	UCPN (Maoist)	12,257	29.61
Dipak Bahadur Gurung	Nepali Congress	12,225	29.54
Shaligram Poudel	CPN (UML)	11,118	26.86
Teknath Bhandari	CPN (Marxist–Leninist)	1,210	2.92
Others	4,580	11.07	
Total		41,390	100.00
Valid votes		41,390	100.00
Invalid/blank votes		0	0.00
Total votes		41,390	100.00
Registered voters/turnout		92,528	44.73
Majority		32	
UCPN (Maoist) hold			
Source: Election Commission

==== 2008 Constituent Assembly election ====
Party	Candidate	Votes
CPN (Maoist)	Dev Prasad Gurung	17,409
CPN (Unified Marxist–Leninist)	Khag Raj Adhikari	14,886
Nepali Congress	Yagya Bahadur Thapa	14,293
Others		1,667
Invalid votes		1,706
Result	Maoist gain	
Source: Election Commission

=== Election in the 1990s ===
==== 1999 legislative elections ====
Party	Candidate	Votes
Nepali Congress	Tara Nath Ranabhat	23,939
CPN (Unified Marxist–Leninist)	Khag Raj Adhikari	20,136
Independent	Dal Bahadur Gurung	2,394
CPN (Marxist–Leninist)	Rabindra Prasad Adhikari	1,752
Others		756
Invalid Votes		710
Result	Congress gain	
Source: Election Commission

==== 1994 legislative elections ====
Party	Candidate	Votes
CPN (Unified Marxist–Leninist)	Khag Raj Adhikari	19,965
Nepali Congress	Tara Nath Ranabhat	18,714
Rastriya Prajatantra Party	Krishna Bahadur Gurung	11,236
Others		572
Result	CPN (UML) gain	
Source: Election Commission

==== 1991 legislative elections ====
Party	Candidate	Votes
Nepali Congress	Tara Nath Ranabhat	20,416
CPN (Unified Marxist–Leninist)		18,683
Result	Congress gain	

== See also ==
- List of parliamentary constituencies of Nepal
