= Krishna Kishor Ghimire =

Nepali politician

Personal details
- Party: Nepali Congress

Krishna Kishor Ghimire (Nepali: कृष्णकिशोर घिमिरे) is a Nepalese politician. He was elected to the Pratinidhi Sabha in the 1999 election on behalf of the Nepali Congress.
