= Ram Hari Dhungel =

Nepalese politician

Personal details
- Party: Nepali Congress

Ram Hari Dhungel (Nepali: रामहरी ढुंगेल) is a Nepalese politician. He was elected to the Pratinidhi Sabha in the 1999 election on behalf of the Nepali Congress.
