= Narayan Sharma Paudel =

Nepali politician

Personal details
- Party: Nepali Congress

Narayan Sharma Paudel is a Nepalese politician. He was elected to the Pratinidhi Sabha in the 1999 election on behalf of the Nepali Congress.
