= Haribhakta Adhikari =

Nepalese politician

Personal details
- Party: Nepali Congress

Haribhakta Adhikari is a Nepalese politician. He was elected to the Pratinidhi Sabha - the then lower house of Parliament - in the 1999 election on behalf of the Nepali Congress.
