= Shanker Prasad Pandey =

Nepali politician

Personal details
- Party: Nepali Congress

Shanker Prasad Pandey (Nepali: शंकर प्रसाद पाण्डे) is a Nepalese politician. He was elected to the Pratinidhi Sabha in the 1999 election on behalf of the Nepali Congress.
