= Devi Khadka =

Nepalese politician

Member of Parliament
- In office 2008–2013

Personal details
- Born: 1979 (age 46–47) Dolakha District, Nepal
- Party: Nepali Communist Party
- Spouse: Raj Kumar Shrestha
- Occupation: Politician

Devi Khadka is a Nepali activist, former Maoist rebel, and parliamentarian, known for her advocacy on behalf of survivors of wartime sexual violence. Born in Dolakha, Nepal, in 1979, Khadka became involved in the Maoist insurgency during Nepal's civil conflict, which lasted from 1996 to 2006.

== Life and career ==
Her life was marked by severe personal trauma; in 1997, at the age of 17, she was brutally tortured and raped by government forces seeking information about her brother, a local Maoist leader.

Despite this, Khadka emerged as a prominent figure in the Maoist movement, eventually becoming a platoon leader and later stepping into her brother's political role after his death in 2002. Following the end of the conflict, she was elected to the Constituent Assembly in 2008, representing the Maoist party. However, Khadka has expressed regret over not speaking out for survivors of sexual violence during her time in office.

Determined to seek justice for herself and others, Khadka has since dedicated her life to advocating for the rights of sexual violence survivors from the conflict. She leads two survivor organizations, working to document cases of wartime rape, secure medical and financial support for survivors, and push for justice through Nepal's Truth and Reconciliation Commission (TRC).

Filmmaker Subina Shrestha released a documentary on Khadka's life, titled Devi, in 2024.

Khadka's work has contributed to ongoing discussions in Nepal about transitional justice, and she remains a vocal critic of the failures of the TRC to adequately address the needs of sexual violence survivors. Despite the challenges, she continues to fight for justice, driven by a belief that even if justice is not achieved in her generation, it will be for the next.
