= Om Prasad Ojha =

Nepali politician

Personal details
- Party: CPN UML

Om Prasad Ojha is a Nepalese politician, belonging to the Communist Party of Nepal (Unified Marxist-Leninist). He was elected to the Pratinidhi Sabha in the 1999 election from the Taplejung-2 constituency with 10402 votes.
