= Lekh Nath Acharya =

Nepalese politician

Member of Parliament, Pratinidhi Sabha
- Incumbent
- Assumed office 1999
- Monarch: King Birendra
- Prime Minister: Krishna Prasad Bhattarai

Personal details
- Party: Nepali Congress

Lekh Nath Acharya (Nepali: लेखनाथ आचार्य) is a Nepalese politician. He was elected to the Pratinidhi Sabha in the 1999 election on behalf of the Nepali Congress.
