= Binayadhoj Chand =

Nepalese politician

Member of Parliament, Pratinidhi Sabha
- In office 28 April 2006 – 16 January 2008
- Preceded by: Himself (2002)
- Succeeded by: Renu Chand (as Member of the Constituent Assembly)
- Constituency: Baitadi 2
- In office 23 June 1999 – 22 May 2002
- Preceded by: Lokendra Bahadur Chand
- Succeeded by: Himself (2006)
- Constituency: Baitadi 2
- In office 20 June 1991 – 11 July 1994
- Preceded by: Constituency created
- Succeeded by: Lokendra Bahadur Chand
- Constituency: Baitadi 2

Personal details
- Party: Nepali Congress

Binayadhoj Chand is a Nepalese politician. He was elected to the Pratinidhi Sabha in the 1999 election on behalf of the Nepali Congress. Chand is the NC candidate in the Baitadi-2 constituency for the 2008 Constituent Assembly election.
