= Gehendra Giri =

Nepali politician

Personal details
- Party: Nepali Congress

Gehendra Giri (Nepali: गेहेन्द्र गिरी) is a Nepalese politician. He was elected to the Pratinidhi Sabha in the 1999 election on behalf of the Nepali Congress. In 2023, Giri was nominated to lead the Senior Citizen Coordination by Sher Bahadur Deuba. In 2024, Giri was one of the signatories to a proposal to make Hinduism the official religion of Nepal.
