= Damodar Bastakoti =

Nepalese politician

Personal details
- Party: Nepali Congress

Damodar Bastakoti (Nepali: दामोदर बस्ताकोटी) is a Nepalese politician. He was elected to the Pratinidhi Sabha in the 1999 election on behalf of the Nepali Congress.
