= Ram Krishna (politician) =

Indian politician

Ram Krishna was an Indian politician from the state of the Madhya Pradesh. He represented Tikamgarh Vidhan Sabha constituency of Madhya Pradesh Legislative Assembly by winning General election of 1957.
