= Tirtha Gautam =

Nepalese politician

- तिर्था गौतम

Member of Parliament, Pratinidhi Sabha for CPN (UML) party list
- In office 4 March 2018 – 18 September 2022

Member of Parliament, Pratinidhi Sabha
- In office May 1999 – May 2002
- Preceded by: Gopalji Jang Shahi
- Succeeded by: Janardan Sharma
- Constituency: Rukum 2

Personal details
- Born: 1963 (age 62–63) Rukum District
- Party: CPN (UML)

Tirtha Gautam is a Nepalese politician, belonging to the Nepal Communist Party currently serving as the member of the 1st Federal Parliament of Nepal. In the 2017 Nepalese general election she was elected as a proportional representative from Khas Arya category. She came into politics after her husband Yadu was killed by the Maoists in 1999. She was first MP (women) in west side of nepal/karnali pradesh
