= Ganga Narayan Shrestha =

Nepalese politician

Honourable Ganga Narayan Shrestha
- गंगानारायण श्रेष्ठ

Minister for Internal Affairs of Bagmati Province
- Incumbent
- Assumed office 2022
- Preceded by: Position created

Member of Bagmati Provincial Assembly
- Incumbent
- Assumed office 2022
- Constituency: Sindhuli 1(A)

Joint chairman of Nepal Socialist Party
- Incumbent
- Assumed office 18 August 2021
- Preceded by: Position created

Personal details
- Born: Sindhuli, Nepal
- Party: Nepal Socialist Party

Ganga Narayan Shrestha (Nepali: गंगानारायण श्रेष्ठ) is a Nepalese politician belonging to Nepal Socialist Party. Shrestha is also serving as member of Bagmati Provincial Assembly.

Shrestha is currently serving as Minister for Internal Affairs of Bagmati Province. Shrestha is also joint chairman of Nepal Socialist Party.

== See also ==
- Nepal Socialist Party
- Provincial Assembly Profile
