= Suresh Malla =

Nepali politician

Personal details
- Party: Rastriya Prajatantra Party

Suresh Malla (Nepali: सुरेश मल्ल) is a Nepalese politician. He was elected to the Pratinidhi Sabha in the 1999 election on behalf of the Nepali Congress.
