= Chitra Lekha Yadav =

Nepali politician

- चित्रलेखा यादव

Minister for Education of Nepal
- In office 25 February 2014 – 12 October 2015
- President: Ram Baran Yadav
- Prime Minister: Sushil Koirala
- Vice President: Paramananda Jha
- Succeeded by: Giriraj Mani Pokharel

Deputy Speaker of Pratinidhi Sabha & Interim Legislature
- In office May 1999 – April 2008
- Preceded by: Lila Shrestha Subba
- Succeeded by: Shiva Maya Tumbahamphe

Member of Parliament, Pratinidhi Sabha for Nepali Congress party list
- In office 4 March 2018 – 18 September 2022

Member of Constituent Assembly for Nepali Congress party list
- In office 21 January 2014 – 13 October 2017

Member of Parliament, Pratinidhi Sabha
- In office May 1999 – May 2002
- Preceded by: Narendra Raj Pokharel
- Succeeded by: Raj Lal Yadav
- Constituency: Siraha 2

Personal details
- Born: 28 May 1965 (age 61) Siraha District
- Party: Nepali Congress

Chitra Lekha Yadav (Nepali: चित्र लेखा यादव), a member of Nepali Congress, assumed the post of the Minister of Education of Nepal on 25 February 2014 under Sushil Koirala-led government. Chitralekha Yadav has been appointed Nepal’s ambassador to Australia, as per Article 282(1) of the Constitution, according to the President’s Office. She is currently serving in this role at the Embassy of Nepal in Australia.

== Political career ==
Chitra Lekha Yadav was elected to the Pratinidhi Sabha in the 1999 election on behalf of the Nepali Congress. Yadav became its deputy chairman. Nepali Congress divided vertically to two parties, one led by former Prime Minister Sher Bahadur Deuba, Nepali Congress (Democratic), and the other is led by Girija Prasad Koirala. After vertical split of the party, she supported Nepali Congress (Democratic) (which later reunified with NC).

Yadav is the NC candidate in the Siraha-2 constituency for the 2008 Constituent Assembly election.
