= Rishikesh Gautam =

Nepalese politician

Personal details
- Party: Nepali Congress

Rishikesh Gautam (Nepali: हृषिकेश गौतम) (born in 1941) was a politician from Nepal. He was elected to the Pratinidhi Sabha in the 1999 election on behalf of the Nepali Congress.
