= Prakash Bahadur Gurung =

Nepali politician

Personal details
- Party: Nepali Congress

Prakash Bahadur Gurung is a Nepalese politician. He was elected to the Pratinidhi Sabha in the 1999 election on behalf of the Nepali Congress. He represented Constituency 3 of the Kaski District.
