= Ajaya Pratap Shah =

Nepali politician

Personal details
- Party: Nepali Congress

Ajay Pratap Shah (died September 12, ? in Lucknow, India) was a Nepalese politician, belonging to the Rastriya Prajatantra Party. In 1999 parliamentary election he was elected from the Kapilvastu-4 constituency, with 14091 votes.

After the royal coup d'état in February 2005, Shah went into exile in India.

After his death, RPP nominated his son, Abhisek Pratap Shah, to take his parliamentary seat in January 2008.
