= Amod Prasad Upadhyay =

Nepalese politician (1936–2025)

- आमोदप्रसाद उपाध्याय

Member of Nepali Congress Central Working Committee (CWC)
- In office September 21, 2010 – Mar 2016

Member of Constituent Assembly of Nepal from Morang-1
- In office May 27, 2008 – May 28, 2012
- Succeeded by: Rishikesh Pokharel

Member of Interim legislature of Nepal
- In office January 15, 2007 – May 26, 2008

Minister of Education and Sports
- In office March 22, 2000 – May 23, 2002
- Prime Minister: Girija Prasad Koirala, Sher Bahadur Deuba

Member of Pratinidhi Sabha from Morang-1
- In office May 1999 – May 23, 2002
- Preceded by: Girija Prasad Koirala

Member of Rashtriya Sabha
- In office 1 June 1991 – 11 January 2005

Personal details
- Born: 29 March 1936 Biratnagar, Nepal
- Died: 14 December 2025 (aged 89) Kathmandu, Nepal
- Party: Nepali Congress
- Spouse: Gunu Upadhyay
- Education: Banaras Hindu University
- Profession: Social worker

Amod Prasad Upadhyay (Nepali: आमोदप्रसाद उपाध्याय; 29 March 1936 – 14 December 2025) was a Nepalese social worker and politician.

== Early life ==
Upadhyay was born in Biratnagar on 29 March 1936, to Janak Prasad Upadhyay and Chandrakumari Upadhyay. He studied at Adarsha Vidyala in Biratnagar and completed his higher secondary education from Benaras, India. He held a Bachelor of Arts in Political Science from Banaras Hindu University.

== Political career ==
Upadhyay joined politics in 1956 as a Nepali Congress activist. An active member of the outlawed political opposition from 1960 to 1990, he was arrested and imprisoned several times by the Panchayat regime for his pro-democracy activities. He spent a total of 16 months under arrest.

He participated in the 1990 People's Movement and served in the Rashtriya Sabha from 1991 to 1995 as a nominated member. He contested and won the 1999 by-elections for the Pratinidhi Sabha from the Morang-1 seat vacated by Girija Prasad Koirala. Upadhyay was Nepal's Minister for Education and Sports from March 2000 to May 2002 in the cabinets of Girija Prasad Koirala and Sher Bahadur Deuba.

Upadhyay protested the royal takeover of February 1, 2005 and was held in detention for several weeks by the government of King Gyanendra citing the Public Security Act (PSA). Following the 2006 democracy movement and the reinstatement of the Pratinidhi Sabha, he served as the Chief Whip of the Nepali Congress Parliamentary Party in the reinstated house and the interim-parliament. In May 2008, he was elected to the Constituent Assembly of Nepal from Morang-1 and was a member of the Judicial System and Security Special committees.

The party's general convention in 2010 elected Upadhyay to the party's Central Working Committee (CWC) from Koshi Zone. He was picked by the CWC to head the Disciplinary Committee of the party on August 15, 2012.

Upadhyay was the Nepali Congress candidate for the 2013 constituent assembly elections from the Morang-1 constituency losing to Rishikesh Pokhrel of the Communist Party of Nepal (UML).

== Death ==
Upadhyay died in Kathmandu, Nepal on 14 December 2025, at the age of 89.

== Electoral history ==
1999 Pratinidhi Sabha Elections Morang-1

Party	Candidate	Votes	Status
Nepali Congress	Amod Prasad Upadhyay	26,501	Elected
Communist Party of Nepal (UML)	Ram Kumar Rai	12,601	

2008 Constituent Assembly Election Morang-1

Upadhyay was the only Nepali Congress candidate elected from the nine seats contested by the party in Morang district in this election.

Party	Candidate	Votes	%	Status
Nepali Congress	Amod Prasad Upadhyay	11,105	24.30	Elected
Communist Party of Nepal (UML)	Ganga Devi Dangi	8,799	19.26	
M.P.R.F - Nepal	Tulu Ram Rajbansi	7,710	16.87	
CPN (Maoist)	Shanta Maya Rai	6,945	15.20	
Nepal Sadbhawana Party	Abdul Rahim Miya	6,165	13.49	
CPN (ML)	Tusli Prasad Siwakoti	1,422	3.11	
Rastriya Prajatantra Party	Ratna Rai	1,036	2.27	
	Others	2,515	5.50	
	Total	45,697	100	

Total Voters: 73,187 Votes Cast: 49,172 (67.19%) Valid Votes: 45,697

2013 Constituent Assembly Election Morang-1

Party	Candidate	Votes	%	Status
Communist Party of Nepal (UML)	Rishikesh Pokharel	14,000	34.17	Elected
Nepali Congress	Amod Prasad Upadhyay	10,940	26.70	
UCPN (Maoist)	Ganesh Uprety	6,501	15.87	
M.P.R.F - Nepal	Binod Kumar Singh Gangain	3,359	8.19	
M.P.R.F - Loktantrik	Mohammad Mahtab Alam	2,048	5.00	
Nepal Sadbhawana Party	Abdul Rahim Miya	1,295	3.16	
	Others	2,832	6.91	
	Total	40,975	100	

Total Voters: 54,722 Votes Cast:44,191 (80.76%) Valid Votes: 40,975
