= Tirtha Ram Dangol =

Nepalese politician

Personal details
- Party: Nepali Congress

Tirtha Ram Dangol (Nepali: तीर्थराम डंगोल) is a Nepalese politician. He was elected to the Pratinidhi Sabha in the 1999 election on behalf of the Nepali Congress.
