= Nagendra Kumar Ray =

Nepali politician

Nagendra Kumar Raya
- नगेन्द्र कुमार राय

Member of Parliament, Pratinidhi Sabha for Nepali Congress party list
- Incumbent
- Assumed office 4 March 2018

Member of Parliament, Pratinidhia Sabha
- In office May 1999 – May 2002
- Preceded by: Khobari Raya Yadav
- Succeeded by: Rajendra Mahato
- Constituency: Sarlahi 4

Personal details
- Born: 4 April 1954 (age 72) Sarlahi District
- Party: Nepali Congress

Nagendra Kumar Raya (Nepali: नगेन्द्र कुमार राय) is a Nepalese politician. He was elected to the Pratinidhi Sabha in the 1999 election on behalf of the Nepali Congress.
