= Keshar Man Rokka =

Nepali politician

Keshar Man Rokka (Nepali: केशरमान रोका) is a Nepalese politician. He was elected to the Pratinidhi Sabha in the 1999 election on behalf of the Nepali Congress. Rokka was the NC candidate in the Rukum-1 constituency for the 2008 Constituent Assembly election. He finished second, obtaining 4015 votes (10% of the votes in the constituency).
