= Taranath Ranabhat =

Nepali politician

Honourable Taranath Ranabhat
- तारानाथ रानाभाट

4th Speaker of the Pratinidhi Sabha
- In office 23 June 1999 – 28 April 2006
- Monarch: Gyanendra
- Deputy: Chitra Lekha Yadav
- Preceded by: Ram Chandra Paudel
- Succeeded by: Subas Chandra Nemwang

Personal details
- Party: Nepali Congress

Taranath Ranabhat (Nepali: तारानाथ रानाभाट) is a Nepalese politician. He was elected to the Pratinidhi Sabha in the 1999 election on behalf of the Nepali Congress. Ranabhat served as its chairman from the same year. He also served as the Speaker of the House of Representatives of Nepal from August 1999 to May 2002.
