= Ministry of Forests and Environment =

Government ministry of Nepal

- वन तथा वातावरण मन्त्रालय
- Emblem of Nepal

Agency overview
- Jurisdiction: Government of Nepal
- Headquarters: Singha Durbar, Kathmandu, Nepal
- Motto: निजामती कर्मचारीको प्रतिवद्धता: पारदर्शिता र चुस्तता
- Minister responsible: Geeta Chaudhary, Cabinet Minister
- Agency executive: Govinda Prasad Sharma, Ph.D., Secretary
- Website: mofe.gov.np

The Ministry of Forests and Environment (Nepali: वन तथा वातावरण मन्त्रालय) is a governmental body of Nepal responsible for the conservation of forests and managing the environment in the country. Its main purposes are to enhance sustainable growth of the forest and water sectors and to manage the biodiversity, flora and fauna and also to increase the development of forest related enterprises in order to combat poverty throughout the rural areas of Nepal.

== History ==
Throughout its history, the ministry had several different names and portfolios. Under the Koirala cabinet and the first Oli cabinet, it was the Ministry of Forests. In 2018, under the Second Oli cabinet, the portfolio of the ministry was changed from Ministry of Forests and Soil Conservation to Ministry of Forests and Environment.

== Organisational structure ==
Two departments serve under the ministry to facilitate and implement its work:

- Department of Forests and Soil Conservation
- Department of Plant Resources
- Forest Research and Training Centre
- Department of National Parks and Wildlife Conservation
- Department of Environment
- REDD Implementation Centre
- President Chure Terai-Madhesh Conservation Development Board

== List of ministers ==
This is a list of former Ministers of Forests and Soil Conservation since the Nepalese Constituent Assembly election in 2013:

| | Name | Party | Assumed office | Left office | Portfolio |
|---|---|---|---|---|---|
| 1 | Mahesh Acharya | Nepali Congress | 25 February 2014 | | Minister for Forests |
| 2 | Agni Sapkota | Communist Party of Nepal (Maoist Centre) | 19 October 2015 | | Minister for Forests |
| 3 | Shankar Bhandari | Nepali Congress | 26 August 2016 | 31 May 2017 | Minister for Forests and Soil Conservation |
| 4 | Prime Minister Sher Bahadur Deuba | Nepali Congress | 7 June 2017 | 11 September 2017 | Minister for Forests and Soil Conservation |
| 5 | Bikram Pandey | Rastriya Prajatantra Party | 11 September 2017 | 15 February 2018 | Minister for Forests and Soil Conservation |
| 6 | Shakti Bahadur Basnet | Nepal Communist Party | 16 March 2018 | 25 December 2020 | Minister for Forests and Environment |
| 7 | Prem Ale | Nepal Communist Party | 25 December 2020 | 4 June 2021 | Minister for Forests and Environment |
| 8 | Narad Muni Rana | CPN UML | 10 June 2021 | 22 June 2021 | Minister for Forests and Environment |
| 9 | Krishna Gopal Shrestha | CPN UML | 24 June 2021 | 12 July 2021 | Minister for Forests and Environment |
| 10 | Ram Sahaya Yadav | People's Socialist Party, Nepal | 8 October 2021 | 4 July 2022 | Minister for Forests and Environment |
| 11 | Pradeep Yadav (Nepalese politician) | People's Socialist Party, Nepal | 4 August 2022 | 14 October 2022 | Minister for Forests and Environment |
| 12 | Birendra Prasad Mahato | People's Socialist Party, Nepal | 24 May 2023 | 4 March 2024 | Minister for Forests and Environment |
| 13 | Nawal Kishor Sah | People's Socialist Party (Nepal, 2024) | 10 March 2024 | 8 July 2024 | Minister for Forests and Environment |
| 14 | Aain Bahadur Shahi Thakuri | Nepali Congress | 15 July 2024 | 9 September 2025 | Minister for Forests and Environment |
| 15 | Sushila Karki | Independent | 12 September 2025 | 12 December 2025 | Prime Minister |
| 16 | Madhav Chaulagain | Independent | 12 December 2025 | 27 March 2026 | Minister for Forests and Environment |
| 17 | Geeta Chaudhary | Rastriya Swatantra Party | 27 March 2026 | Incumbent | Minister for Forests and Environment |
