= Tarinee Datt Chataut =

Nepali politician

Personal details
- Party: Nepali Congress

Tarinee Datt Chataut (Nepali: तारिणी दत्त चटौत) is a politician from Nepal. He served as the Law, justice and parliamentary minister and Tourism, Civil Aviation and Culture minister of Nepal. He was the Chief Whip of Parliamentary Party of Nepali Congress. He was a central working committee member of Nepali Congress Party and served as Chief of Foreign Department and Training Department of the party. He is currently a Constituent Assembly member of Nepal.
