= Ram Krishna Tamrakar =

Nepali politician

Personal details
- Party: Nepali Congress

Ram Krishna Tamrakar is a Nepalese politician. He was elected to the Pratinidhi Sabha in the 1999 election on behalf of the Nepali Congress. After the election he was first Minister of Industry, Commerce and Supplies and then Minister of Health.

Tamrakar is the Treasurer of the Nepali Congress.

In 2005 he was arrested in connection with anti-royal protests.
