= Mahesh Acharya =

Nepali politician

- महेश आचार्य

Minister of Forest and Soil Conservation
- In office 25 February 2014 – 2015
- President: Ram Baran Yadav
- Prime Minister: Sushil Koirala
- Vice President: Paramananda Jha

Personal details
- Born: August 6, 1954 (age 71) Biratnagar-3, Biratnagar
- Parent: Ganesh Prasad Acharya, Shanta Acharya
- Relatives: Durga Ghimire (Sister)
- Profession: Politician

Mahesh Acharya (Nepali: महेश आचार्य) was the minister of Forest and Soil Conservation of Nepal under the government led by Sushil Koirala. Acharya won the Morang–6 seat in Nepalese Constituent Assembly election, 2013 from the Nepali Congress. Acharya is the member of the 2nd Nepalese Constituent Assembly, he is a central member of Nepali congress, Acharya plunged into politics since panchayat era from NC, by taking part in the anti-panchayat movement with leaders including Bishweshwar Prasad Koirala, Girija Prasad Koirala.

== Personal life ==
Mahesh Acharya was born to Ganesh Prasad Acharya and Shanta Acharya on 6 August 1954 in Biratnagar, Nepal.

== Political career ==
He participated in 1989 and 2006 democratic movements too. From various committees of Nepal Student Union to different units and organization of the NC, he took responsibility with key roles. He was Minister of Finance of Nepal from 1991 to 1994 and from 1999 to 2001. He lost the election in 2017 from Morang - 4.
