= Nepali Congress (Democratic) =

Nepali Congress (Democratic) नेपाली काँग्रेस (प्रजातान्त्रिक)
- President: Sher Bahadur Deuba
- General Secretary: Bimalendra Nidhi
- Founded: 22 September 2002
- Dissolved: 25 September 2007
- Split from: Nepali Congress
- Merged into: Nepali Congress
- Headquarters: Kathmandu District
- Ideology: Social democracy

Nepali Congress (Democratic) (Nepali: नेपाली काँग्रेस (प्रजातान्त्रिक) was a political party in Nepal, which was formed in 2002 due to a vertical split of the original Nepali Congress. The Nepali Congress (Democratic) was led by Sher Bahadur Deuba, while the original was led by Girija Prasad Koirala.

== Name ==
Before the name Nepali Congress (Democratic) was chosen, different proposals were discussed. The Central Working Committee member Pradeep Giri suggested Nepali Congress (Socialist, Republic). Other proposals were Nepali Congress (Deuba) and Nepali Congress (Bisweswor, Ganesh Man). The name Nepal Congress (Democratic) was made public on 22 September 2002.

== Tarun Dal ==
Tarun Dal was the youth wing of the Nepali Congress (Democratic). The 3rd general convention of Tarun Dal was held in Chitawan on July 17–20, 2007 and elected Mahendra Yadav as the new president of Tarun Dal.

== Nepal Students Union (Nepal Bidyarthi Sangh) ==
The Nepal Students Union (Nepal Bidyarthi Sangh) was the students wing of Nepali Congress (Democratic). The 8th general convention of Nepal Student Union (NSU) declared Kisor Rathor and Kiran Paudel as president and general secretary. The 9th general convention of the Nepal Students Union (NSU), affiliated with the Nepali Congress (Democratic), was held in Nepalgunj from 10 to 15 July 2007.

== Merger of Nepali Congress and Nepali Congress (Democratic) ==
On 25 September 2007, Nepali Congress (Democratic) and Nepali Congress merged back together. The unified party retains the name Nepali Congress and uses the tree as its election symbol.

== See also ==
- Krishna Prasad Bhattarai
- Sher Bahadur Deuba
- Bimalendra Nidhi
- Nepali Congress
- Nepali Congress (Deuba Faction)
