= House of Representatives (Nepal) =

Lower house of Parliament of Nepal

House of Representatives प्रतिनिधि सभा
- 7th House of Representatives
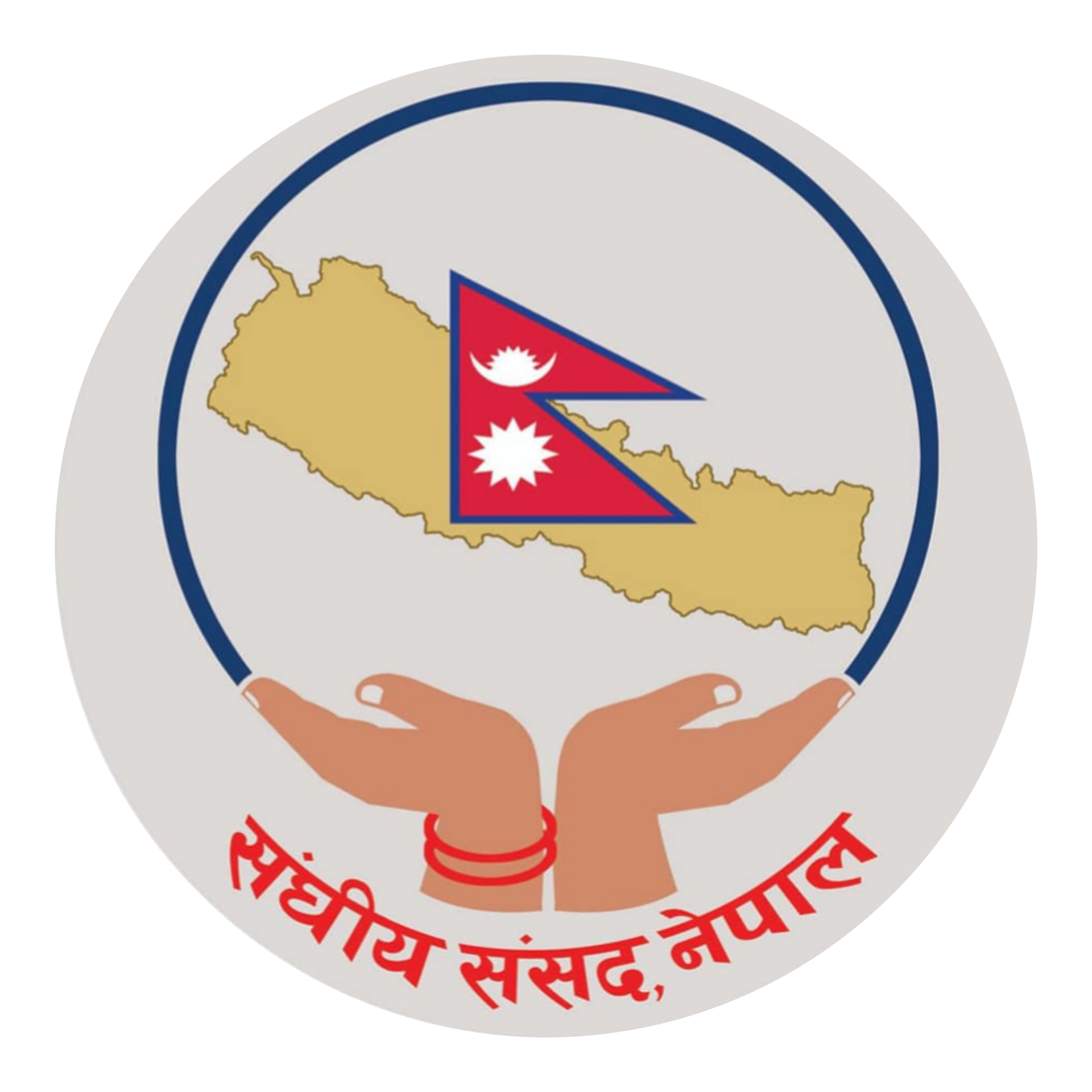
- Emblem of the House of Representatives

Type
- Type: Lower house of the Federal Parliament of Nepal
- Term limits: 5 years

History
- Preceded by: 2nd Nepalese Constituent Assembly

Leadership
- Speaker: Dol Prasad Aryal, RSP since 5 April 2026
- Deputy Speaker: Ruby Kumari Thakur, SSP since 10 April 2026
- Leader of the House (Prime Minister): Balen Shah, RSP since 27 March 2026
- Leader of the Opposition: Bhishma Raj Angdembe, Congress since 27 April 2026

Structure
- Seats: 275
- Political groups: Government (183): RSP (182); Independent (1); Opposition (92): Congress (38); CPN (UML) (25); NCP (17); SSP (7); RPP (5)
- Committees: Parliamentary committees of Nepal
- Length of term: 5 years

Elections
- Voting system: Parallel voting: 165 seats – FPTP; 110 seats – PR
- First election: 18 February 1959
- Last election: 5 March 2026
- Next election: By 2031

Meeting place
- Sansad Bhawan, Singhadurbar, Kathmandu, Nepal

Website
- hr.parliament.gov.np/np

The House of Representatives (Nepali: प्रतिनिधि सभा, romanized: Pratinidhi Sabhā) is the lower house of the bicameral Federal Parliament of Nepal, with the upper house being the National Assembly. Members of the House of Representatives are elected through a parallel voting system. They hold their seats for five years or until the body is dissolved by the president on the advice of the council of ministers. The House meets in the under construction Parliament house at Singha Durbar; before the 2025 Gen Z protests, it met at the International Convention Centre.

The House has 275 members; 165 elected from single-member constituencies by first-past-the-post voting and 110 elected through proportional electoral system where voters vote for political parties, considering the whole country as a single election constituency. The House of Representatives, unless dissolved, continues to operate for five years from the date appointed for its first meeting. However, in a state of emergency, the term of the House of Representatives may be extended, not exceeding one year in accordance with federal law.

The current House of Representatives was elected by the general election held on 5 March 2026, following the dissolution of the previous parliament by the president on 12 September 2025, as a result of the political unrest and Gen Z protest. The inaugural session of the current house convened on 2 April 2026.

== History ==
=== Parliament of Kingdom of Nepal, 1959–1962 ===
The 1959 constitution of the Kingdom of Nepal, proclaimed on 12 February 1959, first mentions the Pratinidhi Sabha first as follows: "There shall be a Parliament which shall consist of His Majesty and two Houses, to be known respectively as the Senate (Maha Sabha) and the House of Representatives (Pratinidhi Sabha)" (Article No. 18, Constitution of the Kingdom of Nepal, 1959).

The 1959 constitution was abrogated on 16 December 1962 when the new Constitution of the Kingdom of Nepal, 1962 was proclaimed and the parliament of the kingdom became unicameral.

=== Post-Panchayat, 1990–2002 ===
The House of Representatives was first provided for by the "Constitution of the Kingdom of Nepal 1990", which replaced the former panchayat system of parliament with a bicameral parliament. It consisted of 205 members directly elected from single-member constituencies. It had five-year terms, but it could be dissolved by the King on the advice of the Prime Minister before the end of its term.

=== Dissolution, 2002–2007 ===
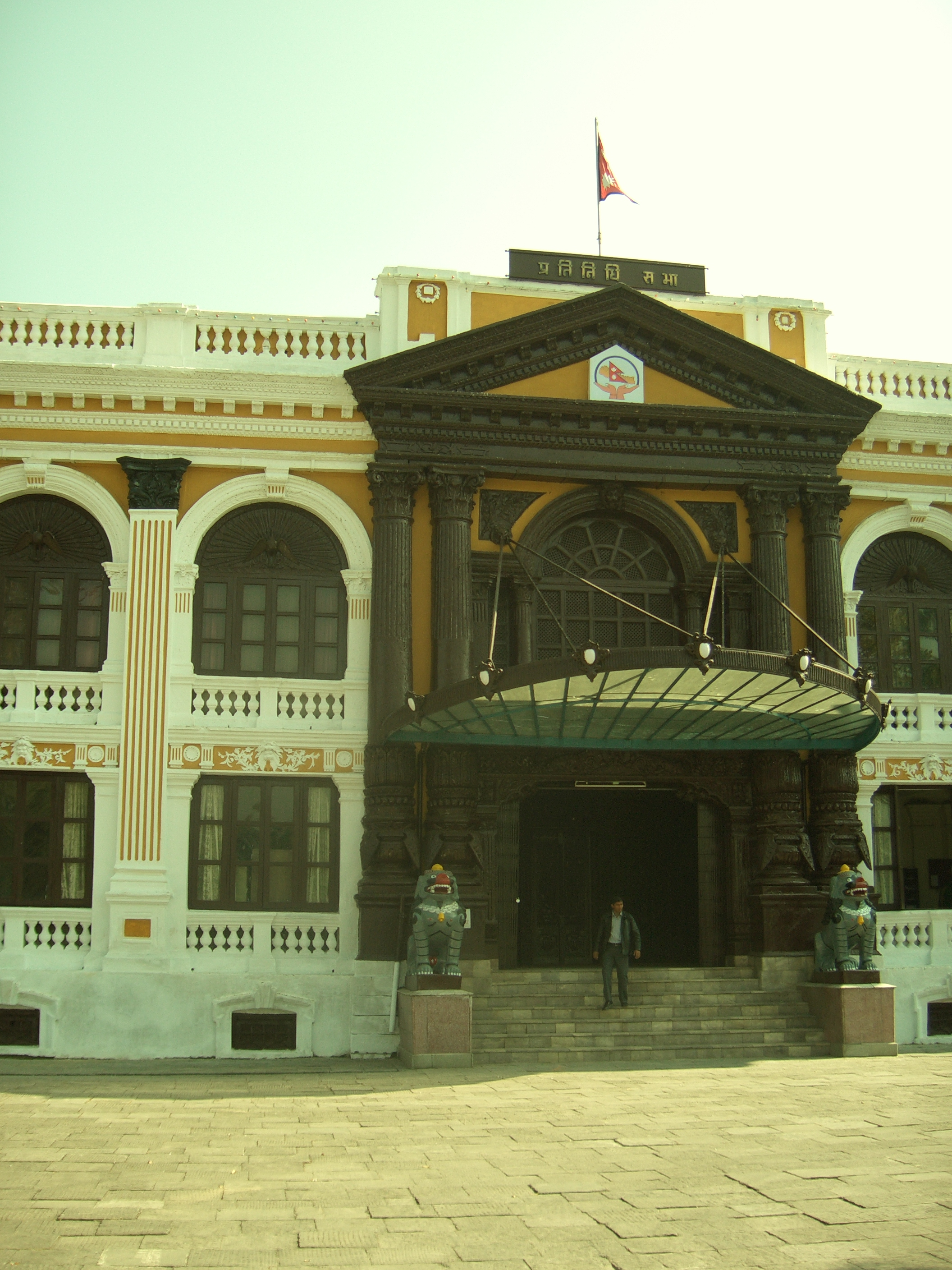
Front face of Pratinidhi Sabha Building

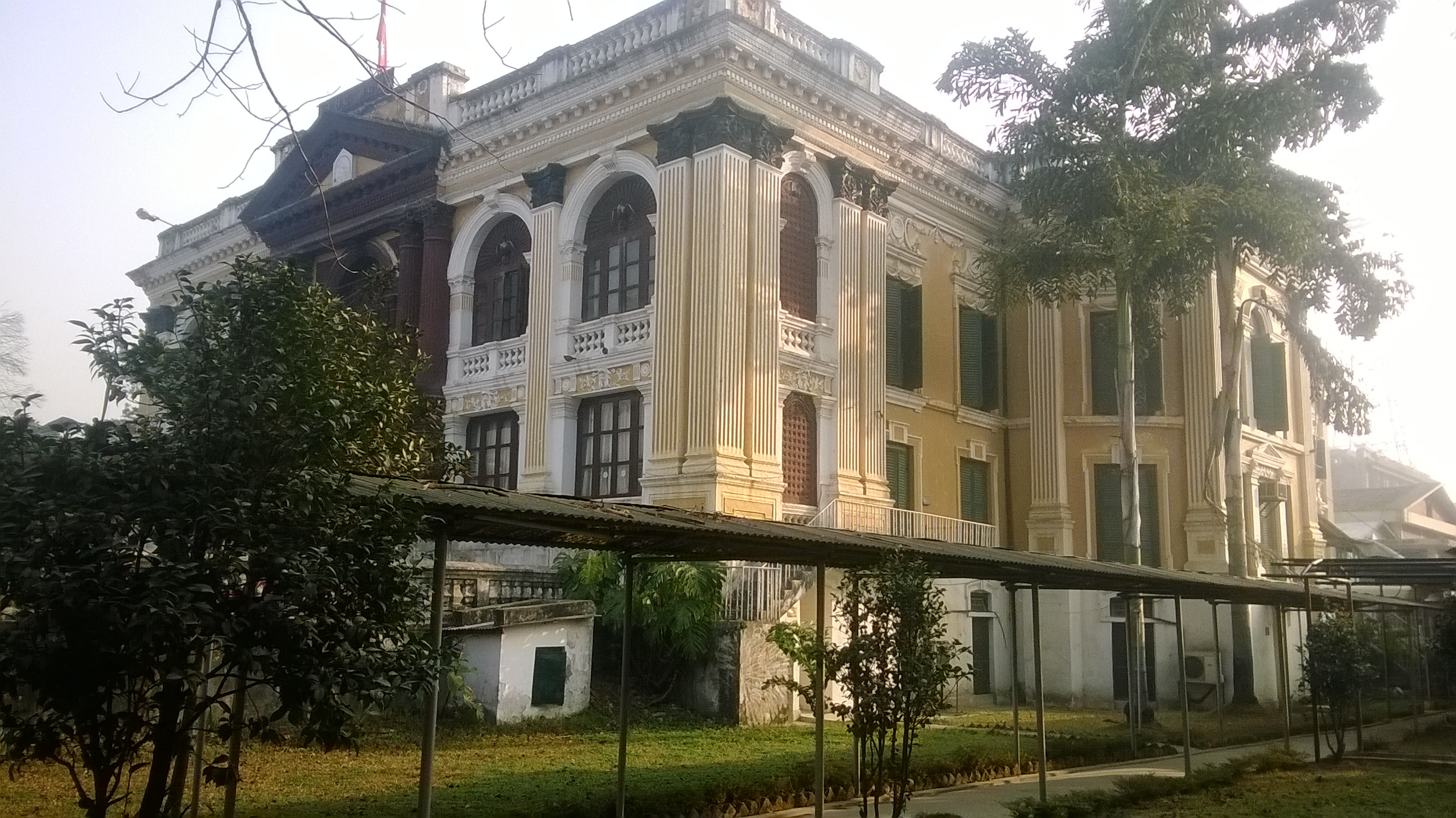
Pratinidhi Sabha building of Nepal (moderation of ancient Gallery Hall)

In May 2002, the House of Representatives was dissolved by King Gyanendra on advice of the then prime minister, Sher Bahadur Deuba, in order to hold new elections. Elections could not take place due to the ongoing civil war, which eventually led King Gyanendra to stage a royal coup. Following the democracy movement of 2006, the King reinstated the earlier legislature. On 15 January 2007, the House of Representatives was transformed into an Interim legislature. This consisted of members appointed under an agreement between the Seven Party Alliance and the Communist Party of Nepal (Maoist) (known by the name Communist Party of Nepal (Maoist Centre), since 2009).

=== Federal Parliament of Nepal, 2015–present ===
The Constitution of Nepal was drafted by the 2nd Constituent Assembly and the provision for a bicameral legislature was re-adopted. The House of Representatives became the lower house of the Federal Parliament of Nepal and its first election was held in 2017.

== Members ==
The composition and powers of the house are established by Parts 8 and 9 of the Constitution of Nepal. The qualifications for becoming a member of the House are laid out in Article 87 of the Constitution and House of Representatives Election Act, 2017. Members must be:

- a citizen of Nepal
- twenty five years or older on date of nomination
- without a criminal offense conviction involving moral turpitude
- not disqualified by any federal law
- not hold any office of profit (paid by the government).

In addition to this, no member can be a member of both the House of Representatives and the National Assembly.

=== Vacation of seat ===
The seat of a member of House of Representatives may be considered vacant in the following circumstances:

- Written resignation to the Speaker
- Unable to comply to Article 91
- Expired term of office / house
- Unclarified / uninformed absence for ten consecutive house sessions
- Resignation / removal from the party to which the candidate was associated during election
- Death

== Composition by province ==
Province	Constituencies
Koshi	28
Madhesh	32
Bagmati	33
Gandaki	18
Lumbini	26
Karnali	12
Sudurpashchim	16

== Officers of the House of Representatives ==
=== Speakers of the House of Representatives ===
Name	Party	Assumed office	Left office	Term
Krishna Prasad Bhattarai	Nepali Congress	3 July 1959	15 December 1960	1st House of Representatives
Daman Nath Dhungana	Nepali Congress	23 June 1991	1 October 1994	2nd House of Representatives
Ram Chandra Poudel	Nepali Congress	18 December 1994	23 March 1999	3rd House of Representatives
Taranath Ranabhat	Nepali Congress	23 June 1999	28 April 2006	4th House of Representatives
Subas Chandra Nembang	CPN (UML)	13 May 2006	15 January 2007	Interim Legislature
Krishna Bahadur Mahara	CPN (Maoist Centre)	10 February 2018	1 October 2019	5th House of Representatives
Agni Prasad Sapkota	CPN (Maoist Centre)	26 January 2020	18 September 2022	5th House of Representatives
Dev Raj Ghimire	CPN (UML)	19 January 2023	19 January 2026	6th House of Representatives
Dol Prasad Aryal	Rastriya Swatantra Party	5 April 2026	Incumbent	7th House of Representatives

=== Deputy Speakers of the House of Representatives ===
Name	Party	Assumed office	Left office	Term
Mahendra Narayan Nidhi	Nepali Congress	31 March 1960	15 December 1960	1st House of Representatives
Mahantha Thakur	Nepali Congress	23 June 1991	17 December 1994	2nd House of Representatives
Ram Vilas Yadav	Rastriya Prajatantra Party	18 December 1994	13 October 1997	3rd House of Representatives
Lila Shrestha Subba	CPN (UML)	6 May 1998	10 October 1998	3rd House of Representatives
Bhojraj Joshi	CPN (UML)	14 October 1998	23 March 1999	3rd House of Representatives
Chitra Lekha Yadav	Nepali Congress	29 June 1999	17 January 2007	4th House of Representatives
Chitra Lekha Yadav	Nepali Congress	29 June 1999	17 January 2007	Interim Legislature
Shiva Maya Tumbahamphe	CPN (UML)	18 March 2018	20 January 2020	5th House of Representatives
Pushpa Bhusal	Nepali Congress	15 July 2022	18 September 2022	5th House of Representatives
Indira Ranamagar	Rastriya Swatantra Party	21 January 2023	28 December 2025	6th House of Representatives
Ruby Kumari Thakur	Shram Sanskriti Party	10 April 2026	Incumbent	7th House of Representatives

== Terms of the House of Representatives ==
Elected in	Term	Seats	Start	End	Elected prime minister (during term)	Party	Head of State
Parliament of the Kingdom of Nepal							Monarch
1959	1st House of Representatives	109	May 1959	December 1960	B. P. Koirala (Cabinet)	Nepali Congress	Mahendra of Nepal
1991	2nd House of Representatives	205	May 1991	August 1994	Girija Prasad Koirala (Cabinet)	Nepali Congress	Birendra of Nepal
1994	3rd House of Representatives	205	November 1994	May 1999	Man Mohan Adhikari (Cabinet)	CPN (UML)	Birendra of Nepal
1994	3rd House of Representatives	205	November 1994	May 1999	Sher Bahadur Deuba (Cabinet)	Nepali Congress	Birendra of Nepal
1994	3rd House of Representatives	205	November 1994	May 1999	Lokendra Bahadur Chand (Cabinet)	Rastriya Prajatantra Party	Birendra of Nepal
1994	3rd House of Representatives	205	November 1994	May 1999	Surya Bahadur Thapa (Cabinet)	Rastriya Prajatantra Party	Birendra of Nepal
1994	3rd House of Representatives	205	November 1994	May 1999	Girija Prasad Koirala (Cabinet)	Nepali Congress	Birendra of Nepal
1999	4th House of Representatives	205	May 1999	May 2002	Krishna Prasad Bhattarai (Cabinet)	Nepali Congress	Birendra of Nepal
1999	4th House of Representatives	205	May 1999	May 2002	Girija Prasad Koirala (Cabinet)	Nepali Congress	Birendra of Nepal
1999	4th House of Representatives	205	May 1999	May 2002	Girija Prasad Koirala (Cabinet)	Nepali Congress	Gyanendra of Nepal
1999	4th House of Representatives	205	May 1999	May 2002	Sher Bahadur Deuba (Cabinet)	Nepali Congress	Gyanendra of Nepal
1999	Interim Legislature	329	April 2006	April 2008	Girija Prasad Koirala (Cabinet)	Nepali Congress	Gyanendra of Nepal
Federal Parliament of Nepal							President
2017	5th House of Representatives	275	4 March 2018	18 September 2022	K. P. Sharma Oli (Cabinet)	CPN (UML)	Bidya Devi Bhandari
2017	5th House of Representatives	275	4 March 2018	18 September 2022	Sher Bahadur Deuba (Cabinet)	Nepali Congress	Bidya Devi Bhandari
2022	6th House of Representatives	275	9 January 2023	12 September 2025	Pushpa Kamal Dahal (Cabinet)	CPN (Maoist Centre)	Ram Chandra Paudel
2022	6th House of Representatives	275	9 January 2023	12 September 2025	K. P. Sharma Oli (Cabinet)	CPN (UML)	Ram Chandra Paudel
2026	7th House of Representatives	275	26 March 2026		Balen Shah (Cabinet)	Rastriya Swatantra Party	Ram Chandra Paudel

== See also ==
- Rashtriya Sabha
- Rastriya Panchayat
- Elections in Nepal
- Federal Parliament of Nepal
