= Fifth Deuba cabinet =

Government of Nepal from 2021 to 2022

Fifth Deuba Cabinet
- Council of Ministers of Nepal

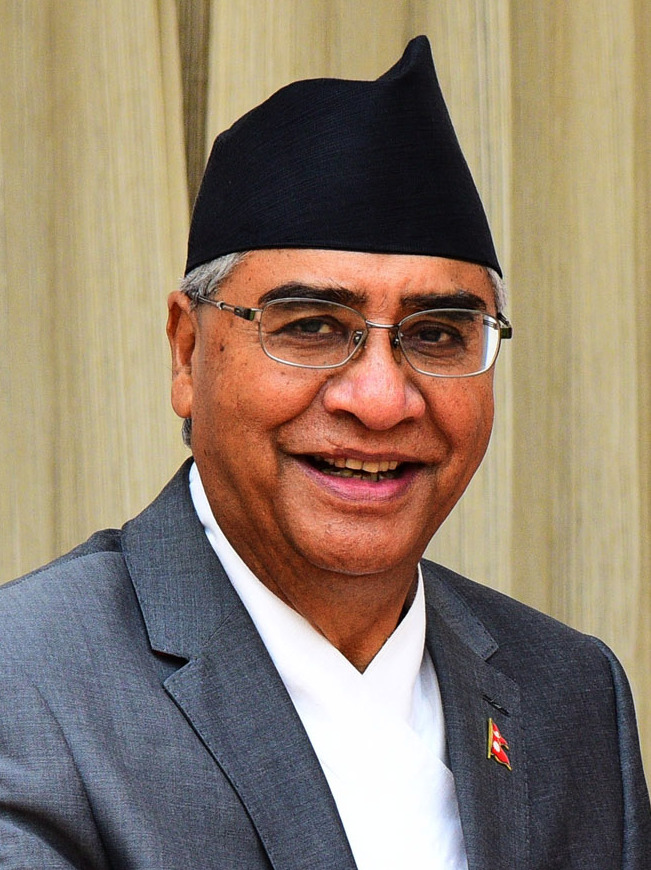
- Date formed: 13 July 2021
- Date dissolved: 26 December 2022

People and organisations
- President: Bidya Devi Bhandari
- Prime Minister: Sher Bahadur Deuba
- Member parties: Nepali Congress; Coalition partners: CPN (Maoist Centre); CPN (Unified Socialist); External support: Loktantrik Samajwadi Party; People's Progressive Party; Rastriya Janamorcha (Note: Represented as Independent in the House of Representatives.)
- Status in legislature: Majority coalition government
- Opposition party: CPN (Unified Marxist–Leninist)
- Opposition leader: KP Sharma Oli, CPN (UML)

History
- Election: 2017 general election
- Legislature term: 1st Federal Parliament of Nepal
- Predecessor: Third Oli cabinet
- Successor: Third Dahal cabinet

The Fifth Deuba cabinet was the Government of Nepal from 13 July 2021 to 26 December 2022. It was formed after Sher Bahadur Deuba was appointed as the new prime minister of Nepal by president Bidya Devi Bhandari following an order from the Supreme Court, which declared the dissolution of the House of Representatives on the recommendation of former prime minister KP Sharma Oli to be unlawful. The fifth Deuba cabinet was replaced by the Dahal cabinet, 2022 on 26 December 2022, when Pushpa Kamal Dahal's CPN (Maoist Centre) broke away from the electoral alliance with Nepali Congress and joined hands with other opposition parties to form a government in the aftermath of the 2022 general election.

The cabinet consisted of an alliance of political parties formed in opposition of former prime minister Oli's dissolution of the House of Representatives. It consisted of Nepali Congress, the CPN (Maoist Centre), CPN (Unified Socialist) and People's Socialist Party, Nepal during formation. The Loktantrik Samajbadi Party, Nepal and Rastriya Janamorcha provides confidence and support to the government.

== History ==
=== Formation ===
On 12 July 2021, the constitutional bench of the Supreme Court ruled that the President's decision to dissolve the House of Representatives on the recommendation of the Council of Ministers was unlawful and ordered the appointment of Deuba as prime minister within 28 hours. President Bhandari appointed Deuba as the Prime Minister in accordance with Article 76 (5) of the Constitution of Nepal, and he was sworn in for a fifth term on 13 July 2021.

Four ministers took their oath of office alongside Deuba. The full cabinet was formed on 8 October 2021.

==== Vote of confidence ====
On 18 July 2021, Minister for Law, Justice and Parliamentary Affairs, Gyanendra Bahadur Karki, registered a proposal for vote of confidence in the first meeting of reinstated House of Representatives. Out of 249 lawmakers present in the meeting, Deuba received support of 165 lawmakers with 83 against while one abstained. Deuba received votes from the CPN (Maoist Centre), the People's Socialist Party, Nepal and a faction of the CPN (UML). The PSPN, collectively voted for Deuba despite internal split within the party.

=== Reactions ===
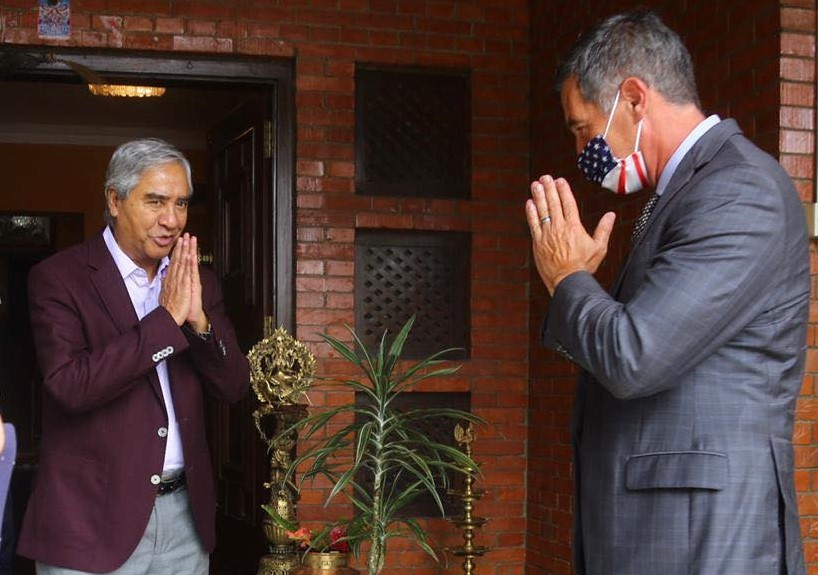
Ambassador Berry at Deuba's residence with congratulatary message

USA: The ambassador of the United States to Nepal, Randy Berry, was the first diplomat to congratulate Deuba, visiting Deuba at his residence with congratulatory messages on 14 July. Earlier, he had congratulated Deuba, within an hour of his appointment, via a tweet.

India: The Indian ambassador to Nepal, Vinay Mohan Kwatra, visited Deuba at his residence on 14 July to congratulate him on his appointment. The Indian prime minister, Narendra Modi, congratulated Deuba via a tweet on 18 July, after Deuba had won the vote of confidence. The two prime ministers had a telephonic conversation on 19 July, where they vowed to "work together to further enhance the wide-ranging cooperation between India and Nepal, including in the fight against the COVID-19 pandemic."

Israel: The Israeli ambassador to Nepal, Hanan Goder-Goldberger, visited Deuba at Singha Durbar on 15 July, stating he was "hopeful of Nepal–Israel relations to get stronger" during Deuba's tenure.

China: The Chinese ambassador to Nepal, Hou Yanqui, visited Deuba at Singha Durbar on 20 July, where she announced the grant of an additional 16 lakh doses of the COVID-19 vaccines to Nepal.

Apart from these, Deuba received congratulatory remarks from the heads of government and diplomats of other countries.

=== Division of ministries among coalition parties and cabinet expansion ===
Intra-party matters of the four parties in the governing coalition delayed the allotment of ministries and resulted in the fulfillment of the cabinet 85 days after the prime minister taking office. Being the largest party in the coalition, Nepali Congress was apportioned eight ministries and one state minister, excluding the prime minister. CPN (Maoist Centre) was apportioned five ministries and one state minister, while CPN (Unified Socialist) and People's Socialist Party, Nepal were apportioned four ministries each, with the former also given one state minister.

NC (9 ministries) – Office of the Prime Minister and Council of Ministers, Ministry of Home Affairs, Ministry of Defence, Ministry of Foreign Affairs, Ministry of Law, Justice and Parliamentary Affairs, Ministry of Industry, Commerce and Supplies, Ministry of Information and Communication, Ministry of Women, Children and Senior Citizens and Ministry of Water Supply

CPN (MC) (5 ministries) – Ministry of Finance, Ministry of Energy, Water Resource and Irrigation, Ministry of Education, Ministry of Land Management, Cooperative and Poverty Allivation, Ministry of Youth and Sports

CPN (US) (4 ministries) – Ministry of Culture, Tourism and Civil Aviation, Ministry of Health and Population, Ministry of Labour, Employment and Social Security, Ministry of Urban Development

PSP-N (4 ministries) – Ministry of Physical Infrastructure and Transportation, Ministry of Agriculture and Livestock, Ministry of Forest and Environment, Ministry of Federal Affairs and General Administration

=== Dissolution ===
On 25 December 2022, the final day of negotiations to form a new government in the aftermath of the 2022 election, the ruling alliance which contested the election together failed to gather a consensus on who would lead the upcoming government, with both Deuba and Pushpa Kamal Dahal laying claim on the position of prime minister. After all negotiations failed, Dahal broke away from the electoral alliance and approached the CPN (UML), which supported his nomination for prime minister, alongside the Rastriya Swatantra Party, Rastriya Prajatantra Party, Janamat Party, PSPN and other independents. President Bhandari appointed Dahal the next prime minister the same day, and he was sworn in for a third term the day after.

== Final arrangement ==
| S.N. | Portfolio | Minister | Political party | Assumed office | Left office | Ref. |
|---|---|---|---|---|---|---|
Cabinet ministers
| 1. | Prime Minister of Nepal: Minister for Defence; Minister for Finance | Sher Bahadur Deuba | Nepali Congress | 13 July 2021 | 26 December 2022 | |
| 2. | Minister for Home Affairs | Bal Krishna Khand | Nepali Congress | 13 July 2021 | 26 December 2022 | |
| 3. | Minister for Information and Communications | Gyanendra Bahadur Karki | Nepali Congress | 8 October 2021 | 26 December 2022 | |
| 4. | Minister for Energy, Water Resource and Irrigation | Pampha Bhusal | CPN (Maoist Centre) | 13 July 2021 | 26 December 2022 | |
| 6. | Minister for Water Supply | Uma Kanta Chaudhary | Nepali Congress | 8 October 2021 | 26 December 2022 | |
| 7. | Minister for Foreign Affairs | Dr. Narayan Khadka | Nepali Congress | 22 September 2021 | 26 December 2022 | |
| 8. | Minister for Industry, Commerce and Supplies | Dilendra Prasad Badu | Nepali Congress | 7 April 2022 | 26 December 2022 | |
| 9. | Minister for Education, Science and Technology | Devendra Paudel | CPN (Maoist Centre) | 8 October 2021 | 26 December 2022 | |
| 10. | Minister for Women, Children and Senior Citizen | Uma Regmi | Nepali Congress | 8 October 2021 | 26 December 2022 | |
| 11. | Minister for Land Management, Cooperatives and Poverty Alleviation | Shashi Shrestha | CPN (Maoist Centre) | 8 October 2021 | 26 December 2022 | |
| 12. | Minister for Youth and Sports | Maheshwar Gahatraj | CPN (Maoist Centre) | 8 October 2021 | 26 December 2022 | |
| 13. | Minister for Law, Justice and Parliamentary Affairs | Gobinda Prasad Sharma (Koirala) | CPN (Unified Socialist) | 7 April 2022 | 26 December 2022 | |
| 14. | Minister for Culture, Tourism and Civil Aviation | Jeevan Ram Shrestha | CPN (Unified Socialist) | 27 June 2022 | 26 December 2022 | |
| 15. | Minister for Urban Development | Metmani Chaudhary | CPN (Unified Socialist) | 27 June 2022 | 26 December 2022 | |
| 16. | Minister for Health and Population | Bhawani Prasad Khapung | CPN (Unified Socialist) | 27 June 2022 | 26 December 2022 | |
| 17. | Minister for Labour, Employment and Social Security | Sher Bahadur Kunwor | CPN (Unified Socialist) | 27 June 2022 | 26 December 2022 | |
| 18. | Minister for Forests and Environment | Pradeep Yadav | People's Socialist Party, Nepal | 4 August 2022 | 14 October 2022 | |
| 19. | Minister for Physical Infrastructure and Transportation | Mohammad Ishtiyaq Rai | People's Socialist Party, Nepal | 4 August 2022 | 14 October 2022 | |
| 20. | Minister for Agriculture and Livestock Development | Mrigendra Kumar Singh Yadav | People's Socialist Party, Nepal | 4 August 2022 | 14 October 2022 | |
State ministers
| 21. | Minister of State for the Office of the Prime Minister and Council of Ministers | Umesh Shreshtha | Nepali Congress | 8 October 2021 | 26 December 2022 | |
| 22. | Minister of State for Education, Science and Technology | Bodhmaya Kumari Yadav | CPN (Maoist Centre) | 8 October 2021 | 26 December 2022 | |
| 23. | Minister of State for Health and Population | Hira Chandra KC | CPN (Unified Socialist) | 27 June 2022 | 26 December 2022 | |

== Former arrangement ==
=== Till 6 July 2022 ===
| S.N. | Portfolio | Minister | Political party | Assumed office | Left office | Ref. |
|---|---|---|---|---|---|---|
Cabinet ministers
| 1. | Prime Minister of Nepal: Minister for Defence | Sher Bahadur Deuba | Nepali Congress | 13 July 2021 | | |
| 2. | Minister for Home Affairs | Bal Krishna Khand | Nepali Congress | 13 July 2021 | | |
| 3. | Minister for Information and Communications | Gyanendra Bahadur Karki | Nepali Congress | 8 October 2021 | | |
| 4. | Minister for Energy, Water Resource and Irrigation | Pampha Bhusal | CPN (Maoist Centre) | 13 July 2021 | | |
| 5. | Minister for Federal Affairs and General Administration | Rajendra Prasad Shrestha | People's Socialist Party, Nepal | 8 October 2021 | | |
| 6. | Minister for Finance | Janardan Sharma | CPN (Maoist Centre) | 13 July 2021 | 6 July 2022 | |
| 7. | Minister for Water Supply | Uma Kanta Chaudhary | Nepali Congress | 8 October 2021 | | |
| 8. | Minister for Foreign Affairs | Dr. Narayan Khadka | Nepali Congress | 22 September 2021 | | |
| 9. | Minister for Physical Infrastructure and Transportation | Renu Yadav | People's Socialist Party, Nepal | 8 October 2021 | 4 July 2022 | |
| 10. | Minister for Industry, Commerce and Supplies | Dilendra Prasad Badu | Nepali Congress | 7 April 2022 | | |
| 11. | Minister for Education, Science and Technology | Devendra Paudel | CPN (Maoist Centre) | 8 October 2021 | | |
| 12. | Minister for Agriculture and Livestock Development | Mahendra Raya Yadav | People's Socialist Party, Nepal | 8 October 2021 | 4 July 2022 | |
| 13. | Minister for Women, Children and Senior Citizen | Uma Regmi | Nepali Congress | 8 October 2021 | | |
| 14. | Minister for Land Management, Cooperatives and Poverty Alleviation | Shashi Shrestha | CPN (Maoist Centre) | 8 October 2021 | | |
| 15. | Minister for Forests and Environment | Ram Sahaya Yadav | People's Socialist Party, Nepal | 8 October 2021 | 4 July 2022 | |
| 16. | Minister for Youth and Sports | Maheshwar Gahatraj | CPN (Maoist Centre) | 8 October 2021 | | |
| 17. | Minister for Law, Justice and Parliamentary Affairs | Gobinda Prasad Sharma (Koirala) | CPN (Unified Socialist) | 7 April 2022 | | |
| 18. | Minister for Culture, Tourism and Civil Aviation | Jeevan Ram Shrestha | CPN (Unified Socialist) | 27 June 2022 | | |
| 19. | Minister for Urban Development | Metmani Chaudhary | CPN (Unified Socialist) | 27 June 2022 | | |
| 20. | Minister for Health and Population | Bhawani Prasad Khapung | CPN (Unified Socialist) | 27 June 2022 | | |
| 21. | Minister for Labour, Employment and Social Security | Sher Bahadur Kunwor | CPN (Unified Socialist) | 27 June 2022 | | |
State ministers
| 22. | Minister of State for the Office of the Prime Minister and Council of Ministers | Umesh Shreshtha | Nepali Congress | 8 October 2021 | | |
| 23. | Minister of State for Education, Science and Technology | Bodhmaya Kumari Yadav | CPN (Maoist Centre) | 8 October 2021 | | |
| 24. | Minister of State for Health and Population | Hira Chandra KC | CPN (Unified Socialist) | 27 June 2022 | | |

=== Till 27 June 2022 ===
| S.N. | Portfolio | Minister | Political party | Assumed office | Left office | Ref. |
|---|---|---|---|---|---|---|
Cabinet ministers
| 1. | Prime Minister of Nepal: Minister for Defence | Sher Bahadur Deuba | Nepali Congress | 13 July 2021 | | |
| 2. | Minister for Home Affairs | Bal Krishna Khand | Nepali Congress | 13 July 2021 | | |
| 3. | Minister for Information and Communications | Gyanendra Bahadur Karki | Nepali Congress | 8 October 2021 | | |
| 4. | Minister for Energy, Water Resource and Irrigation | Pampha Bhusal | CPN (Maoist Centre) | 13 July 2021 | | |
| 5. | Minister for Federal Affairs and General Administration | Rajendra Prasad Shrestha | People's Socialist Party, Nepal | 8 October 2021 | | |
| 6. | Minister for Health and Population | Birodh Khatiwada | CPN (Unified Socialist) | 8 October 2021 | 27 June 2022 | |
| 7. | Minister for Finance | Janardan Sharma | CPN (Maoist Centre) | 13 July 2021 | | |
| 8. | Minister for Water Supply | Uma Kanta Chaudhary | Nepali Congress | 8 October 2021 | | |
| 9. | Minister for Foreign Affairs | Dr. Narayan Khadka | Nepali Congress | 22 September 2021 | | |
| 10. | Minister for Physical Infrastructure and Transportation | Renu Yadav | People's Socialist Party, Nepal | 8 October 2021 | | |
| 11. | Minister for Culture, Tourism and Civil Aviation | Prem Ale | CPN (Unified Socialist) | 8 October 2021 | 27 June 2022 | |
| 12. | Minister for Industry, Commerce and Supplies | Dilendra Prasad Badu | Nepali Congress | 7 April 2022 | | |
| 13. | Minister for Education, Science and Technology | Devendra Paudel | CPN (Maoist Centre) | 8 October 2021 | | |
| 14. | Minister for Agriculture and Livestock Development | Mahendra Raya Yadav | People's Socialist Party, Nepal | 8 October 2021 | | |
| 15. | Minister for Women, Children and Senior Citizen | Uma Regmi | Nepali Congress | 8 October 2021 | | |
| 16. | Minister for Land Management, Cooperatives and Poverty Alleviation | Shashi Shrestha | CPN (Maoist Centre) | 8 October 2021 | | |
| 17. | Minister for Urban Development | Ram Kumari Jhakri | CPN (Unified Socialist) | 8 October 2021 | 27 June 2022 | |
| 18. | Minister for Forests and Environment | Ram Sahaya Yadav | People's Socialist Party, Nepal | 8 October 2021 | | |
| 19. | Minister for Labour, Employment and Social Security | Krishna Kumar Shrestha | CPN (Unified Socialist) | 8 October 2021 | 27 June 2022 | |
| 20. | Minister for Youth and Sports | Maheshwar Gahatraj | CPN (Maoist Centre) | 8 October 2021 | | |
| 21. | Minister for Law, Justice and Parliamentary Affairs | Gobinda Prasad Sharma (Koirala) | CPN (Unified Socialist) | 7 April 2022 | | |
State ministers
| 22. | Minister of State for the Office of the Prime Minister and Council of Ministers | Umesh Shreshtha | Nepali Congress | 8 October 2021 | | |
| 23. | Minister of State for Health and Population | Bhawani Prasad Khapung | CPN (Unified Socialist) | 8 October 2021 | | |
| 24. | Minister of State for Education, Science and Technology | Bodhmaya Kumari Yadav | CPN (Maoist Centre) | 8 October 2021 | | |

=== Till 7 April 2022 ===
| S.N. | Portfolio | Minister | Political party | Assumed office | Left office | Ref. |
|---|---|---|---|---|---|---|
Cabinet ministers
| 1. | Prime Minister of Nepal: Minister for Defence; Minister for Industry, Commerce and Supplies | Sher Bahadur Deuba | Nepali Congress | 13 July 2021 | | |
| 2. | Minister for Home Affairs | Bal Krishna Khand | Nepali Congress | 13 July 2021 | | |
| 3. | Minister for Information and Communications | Gyanendra Bahadur Karki | Nepali Congress | 8 October 2021 | | |
| 4. | Minister for Energy, Water Resource and Irrigation | Pampha Bhusal | CPN (Maoist Centre) | 13 July 2021 | | |
| 5. | Minister for Federal Affairs and General Administration | Rajendra Prasad Shrestha | People's Socialist Party, Nepal | 8 October 2021 | | |
| 6. | Minister for Health and Population | Birodh Khatiwada | CPN (Unified Socialist) | 8 October 2021 | | |
| 7. | Minister for Finance | Janardan Sharma | CPN (Maoist Centre) | 13 July 2021 | | |
| 8. | Minister for Water Supply | Uma Kanta Chaudhary | Nepali Congress | 8 October 2021 | | |
| 9. | Minister for Foreign Affairs | Dr. Narayan Khadka | Nepali Congress | 22 September 2021 | | |
| 10. | Minister for Physical Infrastructure and Transportation | Renu Yadav | People's Socialist Party, Nepal | 8 October 2021 | | |
| 11. | Minister for Culture, Tourism and Civil Aviation | Prem Ale | CPN (Unified Socialist) | 8 October 2021 | | |
| 12. | Minister for Law, Justice and Parliamentary Affairs | Gyanendra Bahadur Karki | Nepali Congress | 13 July 2021 | 8 October 2021 | |
| 12. | Minister for Law, Justice and Parliamentary Affairs | Dilendra Prasad Badu | Nepali Congress | 8 October 2021 | | |
| 13. | Minister for Education, Science and Technology | Devendra Paudel | CPN (Maoist Centre) | 8 October 2021 | | |
| 14. | Minister for Agriculture and Livestock Development | Mahendra Raya Yadav | People's Socialist Party, Nepal | 8 October 2021 | | |
| 15. | Minister for Women, Children and Senior Citizen | Uma Regmi | Nepali Congress | 8 October 2021 | | |
| 16. | Minister for Land Management, Cooperatives and Poverty Alleviation | Shashi Shrestha | CPN (Maoist Centre) | 8 October 2021 | | |
| 17. | Minister for Urban Development | Ram Kumari Jhakri | CPN (Unified Socialist) | 8 October 2021 | | |
| 18. | Minister for Forests and Environment | Ram Sahaya Yadav | People's Socialist Party, Nepal | 8 October 2021 | | |
| 19. | Minister for Labour, Employment and Social Security | Krishna Kumar Shrestha | CPN (Unified Socialist) | 8 October 2021 | | |
| 20. | Minister for Youth and Sports | Maheshwar Gahatraj | CPN (Maoist Centre) | 8 October 2021 | | |
State ministers
| 21. | Minister of State for the Office of the Prime Minister and Council of Ministers | Umesh Shreshtha | Nepali Congress | 8 October 2021 | | |
| 22. | Minister of State for Health and Population | Bhawani Prasad Khapung | CPN (Unified Socialist) | 8 October 2021 | | |
| 23. | Minister of State for Education, Science and Technology | Bodhmaya Kumari Yadav | CPN (Maoist Centre) | 8 October 2021 | | |

=== Till 16 December 2021 ===
| S.N. | Portfolio | Minister | Political party | Assumed office | Left office | Ref. |
|---|---|---|---|---|---|---|
Cabinet ministers
| 1. | Prime Minister of Nepal | Sher Bahadur Deuba | Nepali Congress | 13 July 2021 | | |
| 2. | Minister of Home Affairs | Bal Krishna Khand | Nepali Congress | 13 July 2021 | | |
| 3. | Minister for Information and Communications | Gyanendra Bahadur Karki | Nepali Congress | 8 October 2021 | | |
| 4. | Minister for Energy, Water Resource and Irrigation | Pampha Bhusal | CPN (Maoist Centre) | 13 July 2021 | | |
| 5. | Minister for Federal Affairs and General Administration | Rajendra Prasad Shrestha | People's Socialist Party, Nepal | 8 October 2021 | | |
| 6. | Minister for Health and Population | Birodh Khatiwada | CPN (Unified Socialist) | 8 October 2021 | | |
| 7. | Minister of Finance | Janardan Sharma | CPN (Maoist Centre) | 13 July 2021 | | |
| 8. | Minister of Defence | Dr. Minendra Rijal | Nepali Congress | 8 October 2021 | 16 December 2021 | |
| 9. | Minister for Water Supply | Uma Kanta Chaudhary | Nepali Congress | 8 October 2021 | | |
| 10. | Minister of Foreign Affairs | Dr. Narayan Khadka | Nepali Congress | 22 September 2021 | | |
| 11. | Minister for Physical Infrastructure and Transportation | Renu Yadav | People's Socialist Party, Nepal | 8 October 2021 | | |
| 12. | Minister for Culture, Tourism and Civil Aviation | Prem Ale | CPN (Unified Socialist) | 8 October 2021 | | |
| 13. | Minister for Law, Justice and Parliamentary Affairs | Gyanendra Bahadur Karki | Nepali Congress | 13 July 2021 | 8 October 2021 | |
| 13. | Minister for Law, Justice and Parliamentary Affairs | Dilendra Prasad Badu | Nepali Congress | 8 October 2021 | | |
| 14. | Minister for Education, Science and Technology | Devendra Paudel | CPN (Maoist Centre) | 8 October 2021 | | |
| 15. | Minister for Agriculture and Livestock Development | Mahendra Raya Yadav | People's Socialist Party, Nepal | 8 October 2021 | | |
| 16. | Minister for Women, Children and Senior Citizen | Uma Regmi | Nepali Congress | 8 October 2021 | | |
| 17. | Minister for Land Management, Cooperatives and Poverty Alleviation | Shashi Shrestha | CPN (Maoist Centre) | 8 October 2021 | | |
| 18. | Minister for Urban Development | Ram Kumari Jhakri | CPN (Unified Socialist) | 8 October 2021 | | |
| 19. | Minister for Industry, Commerce and Supplies | Gajendra Bahadur Hamal | Nepali Congress | 8 October 2021 | 10 October 2021 | |
| 20. | Minister for Forests and Environment | Ram Sahaya Yadav | People's Socialist Party, Nepal | 8 October 2021 | | |
| 21. | Minister for Labour, Employment and Social Security | Krishna Kumar Shrestha | CPN (Unified Socialist) | 8 October 2021 | | |
| 22. | Minister for Youth and Sports | Maheshwar Gahatraj | CPN (Maoist Centre) | 8 October 2021 | | |
State ministers
| 23. | Minister of State for the Office of the Prime Minister and Council of Ministers | Umesh Shreshtha | Nepali Congress | 8 October 2021 | | |
| 24. | Minister of State for Health and Population | Umesh Shreshtha | Nepali Congress | 25 July 2021 | 8 October 2021 | |
| 24. | Minister of State for Health and Population | Bhawani Prasad Khapung | CPN (Unified Socialist) | 8 October 2021 | | |
| 25. | Minister of State for Education, Science and Technology | Bodhmaya Kumari Yadav | CPN (Maoist Centre) | 8 October 2021 | | |

== See also ==
- Fourth Deuba cabinet
