= Lalitpur 3 =

Parliamentary constituency in Nepal

- Parliamentary constituency for the House of Representatives
- Lalitpur 3 in Bagmati Province

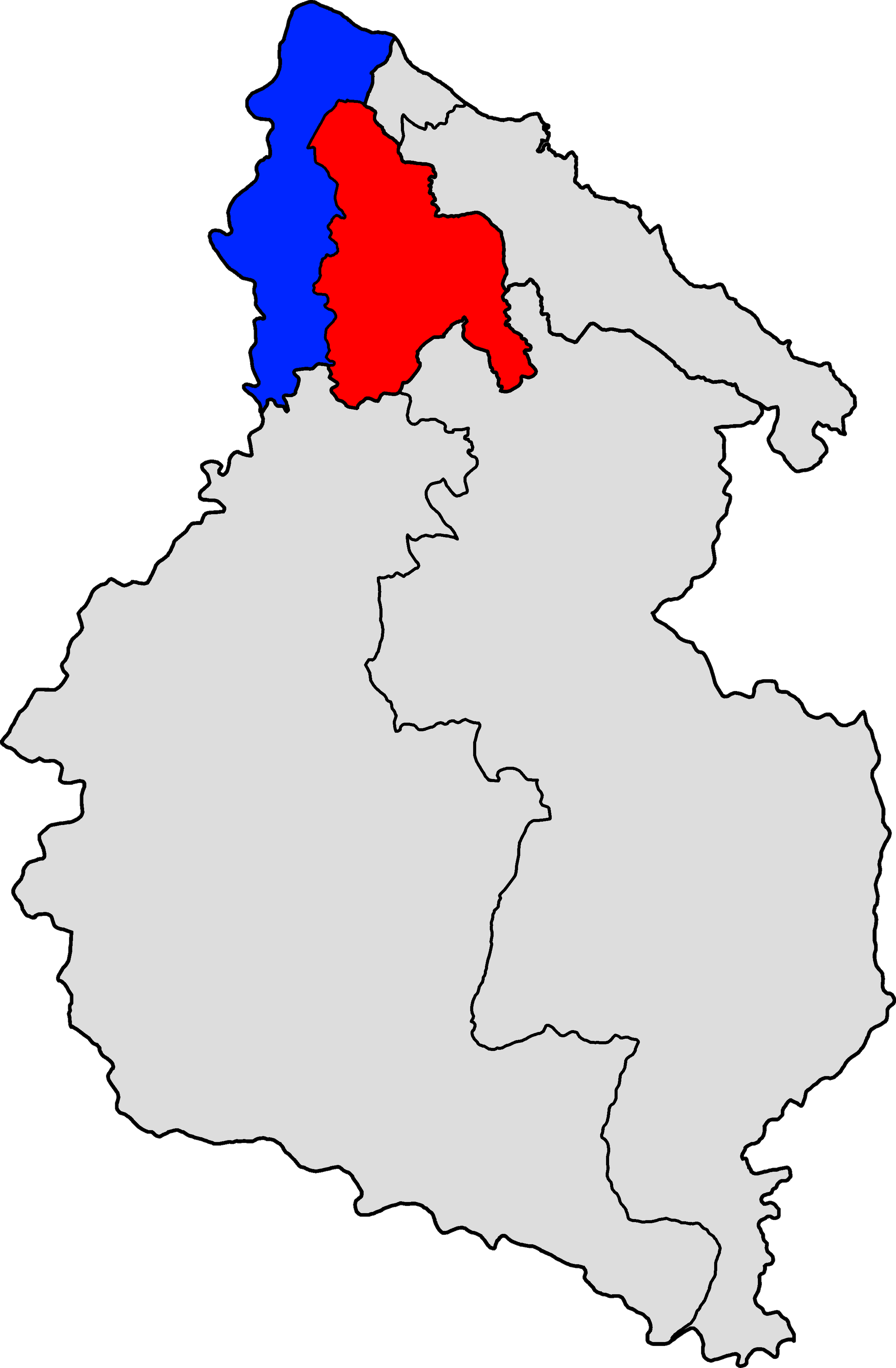
- Assembly segments Lalitpur 3(A) (red) and Lalitpur 3(B) (blue) within Lalitpur District
- Province: Bagmati Province
- District: Lalitpur District
- Electorate: 86,439

Current constituency
- Created: 1991
- Party: Rastriya Swatantra Party
- MP: Toshima Karki
- Bagmati MPA 3(A): Raghu Nath Maharjan (NCP)
- Bagmati MPA 3(B): Prem Bhakta Maharjan (NCP)

Lalitpur 3 is one of three parliamentary constituencies of Lalitpur District in Nepal. This constituency came into existence on the Constituency Delimitation Commission (CDC) report submitted on 31 August 2017.

== Incorporated areas ==
Lalitpur 3 parliamentary constituency consists of wards 1-5,10,13,14,15,18 and 20-29 of Lalitpur Metropolitan City and ward 12 and 14 of Godawari Municipality.

== Assembly segments ==
It encompasses the following Bagmati Provincial Assembly segment

- Lalitpur 3(A)
- Lalitpur 3(B)

== Members of Parliament ==
=== Parliament/Constituent Assembly ===
Election	Member	Party
1991	Lila Mani Pokharel	Samyukta Jana Morcha Nepal
1994	Raghuji Pant	CPN (Unified Marxist–Leninist)
2008	Pampha Bhusal	CPN (Maoist)
January 2009	Pampha Bhusal	UCPN (Maoist)
2013	Madan Bahadur Amatya	Nepali Congress
2017	Pampha Bhusal	CPN (Maoist Centre)
May 2018	Pampha Bhusal	Nepal Communist Party
March 2021	Pampha Bhusal	CPN (Maoist Centre)
2022	Toshima Karki	Rastriya Swatantra Party
2026	Toshima Karki	Rastriya Swatantra Party

=== Provincial Assembly ===
==== 3(A) ====
Election	Member	Party
2017	Raj Kaji Maharjan	CPN (Maoist Centre)
May 2018	Raj Kaji Maharjan	Nepal Communist Party

==== 3(B) ====
Election	Member	Party
2017	Jeevan Khadka	CPN (Unified Marxist–Leninist)
May 2018	Jeevan Khadka	Nepal Communist Party

== Election results ==
=== Election in the 2020s ===
==== 2022 general election ====
Candidate	Party	Votes	%
Toshima Karki	Rastriya Swatantra Party	31,136	53.55
Amrit Khadka	CPN (UML)	12,963	22.29
Pampha Bhusal	CPN (Maoist Centre)	8,769	15.08
Niranjan Thapa	Rastriya Prajatantra Party	2,130	3.66
Rajaram Tandukar	Hamro Nepali Party	1,554	2.67
Others		1,593	2.74
Total		58,145	100.00
Majority		18,173	
Rastriya Swatantra Party gain			

=== Election in the 2010s ===
==== 2017 legislative elections ====
Party	Candidate	Votes
CPN (Maoist Centre)	Pampha Bhusal	24,036
Nepali Congress	Madan Bahadur Amatya	22,328
Bibeksheel Sajha Party	Ujwal Lal Shrestha	7,628
CPN (Marxist–Leninist)	Ram Prasad Bhatta	2,121
Others		3,101
Invalid votes		2,060
Result	Maoist Centre gain	
Source: Election Commission

==== 2017 Nepalese provincial elections ====
===== 3(A) =====
Party	Candidate	Votes
Communist Party of Nepal (Maoist Centre)	Raj Kaji Maharjan	14,626
Nepali Congress	Nawaraj Mahat	10,185
Bibeksheel Sajha Party	Ramesh Kumar Basnet	3,509
Rastriya Prajatantra Party	Sabin Kumar Khadka	1,031
Others		1,862
Invalid votes		776
Result	Maoist Centre gain	
Source: Election Commission

===== 3(B) =====
Party	Candidate	Votes
Communist Party of Nepal (Unified Marxist–Leninist)	Jeevan Khadka	11,701
Nepali Congress	Shiva Ram Baniya	8,693
Bibeksheel Sajha Party	Suresh Raj Shakya	4,268
Others		2,375
Invalid votes		704
Result	CPN UML) gain	
Source: Election Commission

==== 2013 Constituent Assembly election ====
Party	Candidate	Votes
Nepali Congress	Madan Bahadur Amatya	23,566
CPN (Unified Marxist–Leninist)	Raghuji Pant	12,308
UCPN (Maoist)	Dinesh Maharjan	11,441
Rastriya Prajatantra Party Nepal	Babu Kaji Pradhan	6,867
Federal Socialist Party, Nepal	Nhuchhelal Maharjan	1,287
Others		3,691
Result	Congress gain	
Source: NepalNews

=== Election in the 2000s ===
==== 2008 Constituent Assembly election ====
Party	Candidate	Votes
CPN (Maoist)	Pampha Bhusal	18,930
CPN (Unified Marxist–Leninist)	Raghuji Pant	10,632
Nepali Congress	Mohan Shyam Paudel	10,251
Rastriya Janashakti Party	Keshar Bahadur Bista	5,117
Janamorcha Nepal	Dipendra Shrestha	3,212
Nepa Rastriy Party	Dhan Bhakta Shakya	1,262
CPN (Marxist–Leninist)	Madhu Kumar Chalise	1,198
Others		3,898
Invalid votes		2,097
Result	Maoist gain	
Source: Election Commission

=== Election in the 1990s ===
==== 1999 legislative elections ====
Party	Candidate	Votes
CPN (Unified Marxist–Leninist)	Raghuji Pant	15,570
Nepali Congress	Kamala Maskey	12,240
Samyukta Jana Morcha Nepal	Shashi Pokhrel Shrestha	5,942
Rastriya Prajatantra Party	Balaram Gharti Magar	5,627
Others		1,819
Invalid Votes		836
Result	CPN (UML) hold	
Source: Election Commission

==== 1994 legislative elections ====
Party	Candidate	Votes
CPN (Unified Marxist–Leninist)	Raghuji Pant	15,733
Nepali Congress	Omkar Shrestha	13,660
Samyukta Jana Morcha Nepal	Dil Bahadur Shrestha	4,526
Rastriya Prajatantra Party	Ram Hari Thapa	4,003
Others		2,364
Result	CPN (UML) gain	
Source: Election Commission

==== 1991 legislative elections ====
Party	Candidate	Votes
Samyukta Jana Morcha Nepal	Lila Mani Pokharel	19,749
Nepali Congress	Marshal Julaum Shakya	15,842
Result	SJMN gain	

== See also ==
- List of parliamentary constituencies of Nepal
