= Umesh Shrestha =

Nepalese politician

- उमेश श्रेष्ठ

Treasurer of Nepali Congress
- Incumbent
- Assumed office 15 May 2026
- Appointed by: Gagan Thapa
- President: Gagan Thapa
- In office 24 November 2024 – 16 January 2026
- Appointed by: Sher Bahadur Deuba
- President: Sher Bahadur Deuba

Minister of State for Office of the Prime Minister and Council of Ministers of Nepal
- In office 8 October 2021 – 26 December 2022
- President: Bidya Devi Bhandari
- Prime Minister: Sher Bahadur Deuba

State Minister of Health and Population
- In office 25 July 2021 – 8 October 2021
- President: Bidya Devi Bhandari
- Prime Minister: Sher Bahadur Deuba
- Preceded by: Nawaraj Rawat
- Succeeded by: Bhawani Prasad Khapung

Member of the House of Representatives
- In office 4 March 2018 – 18 September 2022
- PR group: Indigenous peoples
- Constituency: Nepali Congress PR list

Member of the Legislature Parliament of Nepal
- In office 31 August 2014 – 14 October 2017
- Nominated by: Sushil Koirala cabinet
- Constituency: Nominated (Nepali Congress)

Personal details
- Born: 3 February 1956 (age 70) Bhojpur Bazaar, Bhojpur District, Nepal
- Party: Nepali Congress (2008-present)
- Parents: Badri Prasad Shrestha (father); Lila Devi Shrestha (mother)
- Education: MA, B.Ed.

Umesh Shrestha (Nepali: उमेश श्रेष्ठ; born 3 February 1956) is a Nepalese politician, educator, and businessman. He is the treasurer of the Nepali Congress.

Shrestha served as State Minister for Health and Population from July to October 2021 in the Fifth Deuba cabinet. He later served as Minister of State in the Office of the Prime Minister and Council of Ministers.

== Early life and education ==
Shrestha was born in Bhojpur on 3 February 1956. He completed his School Leaving Certificate (SLC) education in Bhojpur and later earned a Bachelor of Education (B.Ed.) degree and a master's degree in Kathmandu.

== Career ==
=== Education ===
Shrestha has been involved in Nepal's private education sector for more than four decades. He served as chairperson and senior chairperson of the Private and Boarding Schools' Organisation Nepal (PABSON). He has also been associated with the Higher Institutions and Secondary Schools' Association Nepal (HISSAN), serving in leadership and advisory roles.

Shrestha is a co-founder of Little Angels' School, which was established in 1981 together with Bidya Limbu. He has also been associated with several educational institutions and organizations in Nepal.

=== Business ===
Outside education, Shrestha has been involved in business activities in sectors including agriculture, hydropower, hospitality, and healthcare.

=== Politics ===
Shrestha was elected as a member of the 2nd Nepalese Constituent Assembly under the proportional representation system from the Nepali Congress. He was later elected to the House of Representatives under the party-list proportional representation system in the 2017 general election.

On 25 July 2021, Prime Minister Sher Bahadur Deuba appointed Shrestha as State Minister for Health and Population. In October 2021, he was appointed Minister of State in the Office of the Prime Minister and Council of Ministers.
