= Tehrathum 1 =

Parliamentary constituency in Nepal

- Parliamentary constituency
- Tehrathum 1 in Province No. 1
- Province: Province No. 1
- District: Tehrathum District

Current constituency
- Created: 1991
- Party: Nepali Congress
- Member of Parliament: Sita Gurung

Tehrathum 1 is the parliamentary constituency of Tehrathum District in Nepal. This constituency came into existence on the Constituency Delimitation Commission (CDC) report submitted on 31 August 2017.

== Incorporated areas ==
Tehrathum 1 incorporates the entirety of Tehrathum District.

== Assembly segments ==
It encompasses the following Province No. 1 Provincial Assembly segment

- Tehrathum 1(A)
- Tehrathum 1(B)

== Members of Parliament ==
=== Parliament/Constituent Assembly ===
Election	Member	Party
1991	Bijay Subba	CPN (Unified Marxist–Leninist)
1994	Surendra Kumar Phambo	CPN (Unified Marxist–Leninist)
1999	Bijay Subba	CPN (Unified Marxist–Leninist)
2008	Tulsi Subba	Nepali Congress
2013	Bhawani Prasad Khapung	CPN (Unified Marxist–Leninist)
May 2018	Bhawani Prasad Khapung	Nepal Communist Party
March 2021	Bhawani Prasad Khapung	CPN (Unified Marxist–Leninist)
August 2021	Bhawani Prasad Khapung	CPN (Unified Socialist)
2022	Sita Gurung	Nepali Congress

=== Provincial Assembly ===
==== 1(A) ====
Election	Member	Party
2017	Lachhuman Tiwari	CPN (Unified Marxist-Leninist)
May 2018	Lachhuman Tiwari	Nepal Communist Party
March 2021	Lachhuman Tiwari	CPN (Unified Marxist–Leninist)

==== 1(B) ====
Election	Member	Party
2017	Tejman Kandangwa	CPN (Unified Marxist-Leninist)
May 2018	Tejman Kandangwa	Nepal Communist Party
March 2021	Tejman Kandangwa	CPN (Unified Marxist–Leninist)

== Election results ==
=== Election in the 2020s ===
==== 2022 general election ====
Candidate	Party	Votes	%
Sita Gurung	Nepali Congress	19,707	49.39
Bijay Subba	CPN (UML)	18,631	46.69
Others		1,563	3.92
Total		39,901	100.00
Majority		1,076	
Nepali Congress gain			

==== 2022 provincial election ====
===== 1(A) =====
Candidate	Party	Votes	%
Kishore Chandra Dulal	CPN (UML)	10,072	46.06
Santosh Subba	Nepali Congress	9,855	45.06
Others	1,942	8.88	
Total		21,869	100.00
Majority		217	
CPN (UML)			

===== 1(B) =====
Candidate	Party	Votes	%
Durga Prasad Chapagain	CPN (Maoist Centre)	8,398	46.16
Tejman Kandangba	CPN (UML)	8,104	44.54
Sher Bahadur Ingnam	Sanghiya Loktantrik Rastriya Manch	810	4.45
Others	881	4.84	
Total		18,193	100.00
Majority		294	
CPN (Maoist Centre)			

=== Election in the 2010s ===
==== 2017 legislative elections ====
Party	Candidate	Votes
CPN (Unified Marxist–Leninist)	Bhawani Prasad Khapung	21,335
Nepali Congress	Sita Gurung	19,314
Others		1,652
Invalid votes		1,900
Result	CPN (UML) hold	
Source: Election Commission

==== 2017 Nepalese provincial elections ====
===== 1(A) =====
Party	Candidate	Votes
CPN (Unified Marxist–Leninist)	Lachhuman Tiwari	11,726
Nepali Congress	Govinda Prasad Dhungana	10,260
Others		1,359
Invalid votes		891
Result	CPN (UML) gain	
Source: Election Commission

===== 1(B) =====
Party	Candidate	Votes
CPN (Unified Marxist–Leninist)	Tejman Kandangwa	10,302
Nepali Congress	Bijay Sambahamphe	8,047
Others		754
Invalid votes		712
Result	CPN (UML) gain	
Source: Election Commission

==== 2013 Constituent Assembly election ====
Party	Candidate	Votes
CPN (Unified Marxist–Leninist)	Bhawani Prasad Khapung	15,111
Nepali Congress	Tulsi Subba	13,108
UCPN (Maoist)	Durga Prasad Chapagain	5,837
Federal Socialist Party, Nepal	Kapil Dev Singhak	1,021
Others		2,251
Result	CPN (UML) gain	
Source: NepalNews

=== Election in the 2000s ===
==== 2008 Constituent Assembly election ====
Party	Candidate	Votes
Nepali Congress	Tulsi Subba	19,113
CPN (Unified Marxist–Leninist)	Bhawani Prasad Khapung	15,375
CPN (Maoist)	Nar Bahadur Limbu	9,193
Sanghiya Loktantrik Rastriya Manch	Dal Bahadur Limbu	1,722
CPN (Marxist–Leninist)	Yogendra Prasad Gadtaula	1,694
Others		1,732
Invalid votes		2,194
Result	Congress gain	
Source: Election Commission

=== Election in the 1990s ===
==== 1999 legislative elections ====
Party	Candidate	Votes
CPN (Unified Marxist–Leninist)	Bijay Subba	16,628
Nepali Congress	Ganesh Prasad Bimali	12,022
Independent	Tulsi Sibba	10,723
CPN (Marxist–Leninist)	Khagendra Raj Sitaula	5,282
Rastriya Prajatantra Party	Parshu Ram Khapung	3,278
Rastriya Janamukti Party	Ram Bahdur Tumbahamphe	1,094
Others		498
Invalid Votes		963
Result	CPN (UML) hold	
Source: Election Commission

==== 1994 legislative elections ====
Party	Candidate	Votes
CPN (Unified Marxist–Leninist)	Surendra Kumar Phambo	16,657
Rastriya Prajatantra Party	Tulsi Sibba	12,867
Nepali Congress	Tej Prasad Sitaula	11,844
Rastriya Janamukti Party	Indra Dhan Limbu	2,292
Independent	Kali Bahadur Putong	130
Result	CPN (UML) hold	
Source: Election Commission

==== 1991 legislative elections ====
Party	Candidate	Votes
CPN (Unified Marxist–Leninist)	Bijay Subba	10,705
Rastriya Prajatantra Party (Thapa)	Tulsi Subba	7,169
Result	CPN (UML) gain	

== See also ==
- List of parliamentary constituencies of Nepal
