= Oli cabinet =

Oli cabinet may refer to:

- First Oli cabinet
- Second Oli cabinet
- Third Oli cabinet
- Fourth Oli cabinet
