= No, Not Again =

Social media campaign

No, Not Again (Devanagari: नो, नट अगेन) is a campaign on social media against the elderly established political leaders amid 2022 general election and provincial elections in Nepal. The campaign is primarily targeted to the prime ministers and the ministers, both incumbent and former.

The election commission of Nepal issued a statement against the social media pages running the campaign on 25 October 2022, in response to the complain by minister Pampha Bhusal. The writs against the election commission were registered in the Supreme Court.
