= Mahesh Kumar Bartaula =

Nepali politician

- महेश कुमार वर्तौला

Member of Parliament, Pratinidhi Sabha
- In office 26 December 2022 – 12 September 2025
- Preceded by: Birodh Khatiwada
- Succeeded by: Prashant Upreti
- Constituency: Makwanpur 2

Personal details
- Born: 7 September 1982 (age 43) Makwanpur District
- Party: CPN (UML)
- Parent: Govinda Bahadur Bartaula (father)

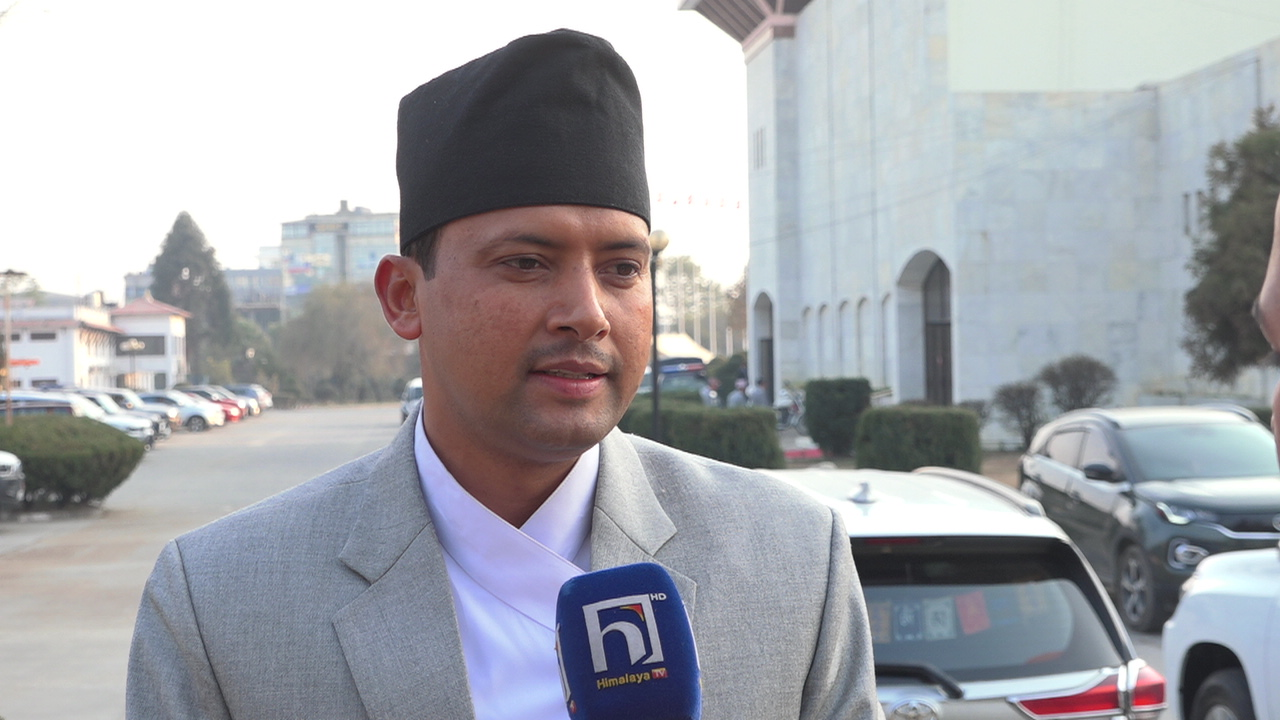

Mahesh Kumar Bartaula is a Nepalese politician, belonging to the CPN (UML) who served as a member of the 2nd Federal Parliament of Nepal. In the 2022 Nepalese general election, he was elected from the Makwanpur 2 (constituency).
