= Uma Dahal =

Nepalese politician

- उमा दाहाल
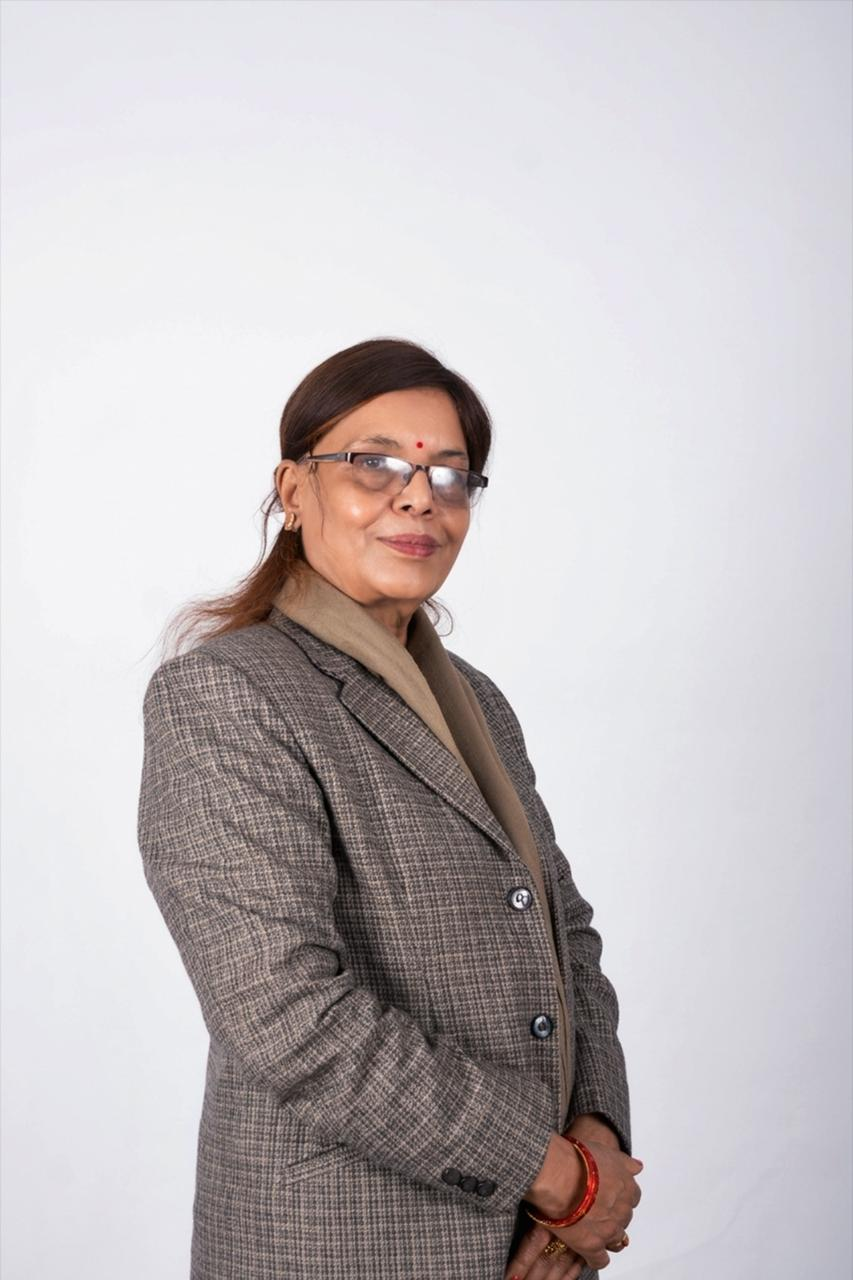

Central Committee Member, Nepali Congress
- Incumbent
- Assumed office 16 October 2026
- President: Gagan Thapa
- In office 16 January 2026 – 15 October 2026
- President: Gagan Thapa

Personal details
- Citizenship: Nepalese
- Party: Nepali Congress
- Parent: Indra Prasad Ghimire (father)

Uma Dahal (Nepali: उमा दाहाल) is a Nepalese politician and businesswoman. She is serving as the Central Committee Member of Nepali Congress.She has been continuously serving as the Maha Samiti member of Nepali Congress since 2048 BS.

Dahal manages executive operations across infrastructure, education, health care, agriculture and finance sectors. She serves as the leader of many private companies across Nepal.

== Political career ==
Previously, she had contested in the 2013 constituent assembly election under first-past-the-post system from Makwanpur 4 but was defeated.

In 2022 general election, she was the candidate of the party in the proportional representation from Khas Arya category.

During the Second special convention of Nepali Congress, she was elected as the Central Committee Member under women Bagmati province category under the leadership of Gagan Thapa.

In the 15th general convention of Nepali Congress, she was re-elected as the Central Committee Member under women's open category.
