= Little Angels' School =

Little Angels' School and College
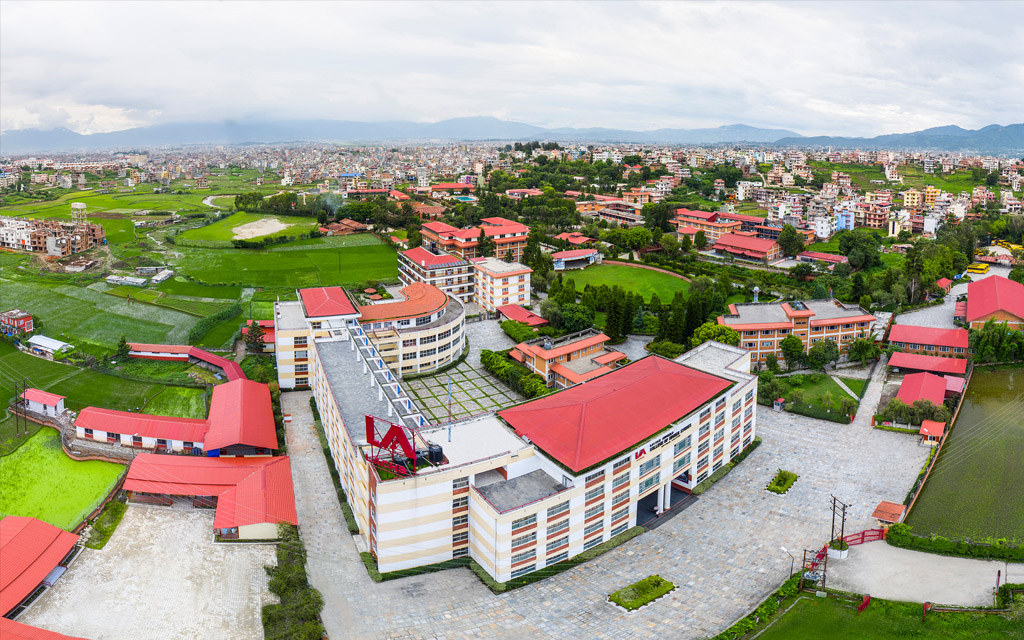

Location
- Hattiban, Laltipur; Nepal; 27.651°N 85.336°E

Information
- Type: Educational
- Motto: One goal, one mission. Our children, our nation.
- Established: 1981
- School district: Lalitpur
- Principal: Mr. Mukunda Raj Sharma
- Enrolment: 9000 (School Level), 5000 (College Level)
- Language: English, Nepali
- Nickname: LAS, LA, LAC, LACHS
- Yearbook: Bud Magazine
- Website: www.las.edu.np

Little Angels' School is a private school based in Hattiban, Lalitpur District of Nepal. It offers schooling, A-Levels and +2 facilities, and education up to the SEE.

== Description and history ==
Little Angels' School (LAS) has a primary wing near its buildings. The main Hattiban campus offers education up to high school but also includes post-secondary levels. In 2066 BS (2010 AD), LAS began offering the internationally recognized General Certificate of Education classes - Cambridge A-Level. It is promoted as an English medium school. The school teaches more than 4,600 students. Including A-Level students, Little Angels College, and Little Angels College of Management, total enrollment is about 6,400 students, and just above 700 teachers/lecturers are employed.

Little Angels School was started in 1981, Both the founder principals were in the field of education long before LAS was born—one in administration, the other in teaching. The founders - Bidya Limbu and Umesh Shrestha - now act as founder directors while the responsibilities of a principal are handled by Mukunda Raj Sharma. Shrestha holds an M.A. in School Management.

The school uses about 130 buses to transport almost 8,000 students each school day.

The school premises includes four basketball courts, a football and a futsal ground, two lawn tennis courts, two volleyball courts, and a spacious playground in each block. The school has two swimming pools for the students.The school also has a karate and a whusu Hall, dance hall, and a music class. Furthermore, the students can select one of 12 activities as extra curriculum.

Little Angels' School is a member of the Private and Boarding Schools Organization of Nepal (PABSON).

=== School Leaving Certificate record ===
The Little Angels school academic record with the percentage of students successfully obtaining the School Leaving Certificate, up to the Bikram Samwat calendar year 2064 (2008):

SLC Year in Bikram Samwat	Number of students	Passing percentage	1st Division	Top honours
2065	528	99.24%	336	168 Dis
2064	516	99%		131 Dis.
2063	649	98.72%	491	150 Dis
2062	494	100%	475	
2061	453	98.01%	354	
2060	532	99.62%	418	
2059	534	99.44%	430	
2058	462	99.75%	369	1st among the girls.
2057	402	99.5	322	
2056	343	95%	275	
2055	377	100%	315	1st & 3rd among the girl (4 in top ten)
2054	296	97%	226	1st, 2nd, & 3rd among the girl (4 in top ten)
2053	232	100%	205	2 Students in Top ten
2047–2052	540	99.66%	480	3 Girls in Top ten

== Little Angels' College ==
The Little Angels' College (LAC) was founded in 1997 under the Nepal Educational Foundation. Total enrollment is about 480 students. There were ten sections (4 physical groups and 6 biological groups) in the year 2016/17. In 2003, LAC introduced GCE A Level course.

== Little Angels' College of Management ==
The Little Angels' College of Management (LACM) was founded in 1999. LACM offers BBA, BBIS and BHM degrees in affiliation with Kathmandu University.

The Fees of Little Angle School According to the census 2023 Level Admission Fee Monthly Fee Pre-Primary Level Rs 30,000 Rs 15,000 Primary Level Rs 50,000 Rs 20,000 Secondary Level Rs 80,000 Rs 40,000 Up Warded Level Rs 1,50,000 Rs 50,000
