= Gajendra Hamal =

Nepali politician

Gajendra Bahadur Hamal
- गजेन्द्र बहादुर हमाल

Minister of Industry, Commerce and Supplies
- In office 8 October 2021 – 10 October 2021
- President: Bidya Devi Bhandari
- Prime Minister: Sher Bahadur Deuba
- Preceded by: Raj Kishor Yadav

Personal details
- Born: Banke, Nepal
- Party: Nepali Congress

Gajendra Bahadur Hamal (Nepali: गजेन्द्र बहादुर हमाल; born 19 February 1954) is a Nepali politician who was briefly the Minister for Industry, Commerce and Supplies in the fifth Deuba cabinet. He resigned after only two days in office when his appointment became controversial after reports suggested he was appointed minister after his brother-in-law Chief Justice Cholendra Shumsher JBR, who had earlier reinstated parliament making it possible for Deuba to become prime minister, pressured the coalition partners to appoint two people close to him as ministers.

Hamal is a long-time district-level leader of Nepali Congress from Banke District.
