= Bijay Subba (politician) =

Nepali politician

- बिजय सुब्बा

Member of Parliament, Praitnidhi Sabha for CPN (UML) party list
- In office 4 March 2018 – 18 September 2022

Member of Parliament, Pratinidhi Sabha
- In office May 1999 – May 2002
- Preceded by: Surendra Kumar Phambo
- Succeeded by: Tulsi Subba
- Constituency: Tehrathum 1
- In office May 1991 – August 1994
- Preceded by: Constituency established
- Succeeded by: Surendra Kumar Phambo
- Constituency: Tehrathum 1

Personal details
- Born: 27 December 1957 (age 68) Tehrathum District
- Party: CPN (UML) (until 2012, 2015–present)
- Other political affiliations: Federal Socialist Party (2012–2015)
- Education: Tribhuvan University (PhD)

Bijay Subba (born 27 December 1957) is a Nepali politician and a member of the House of Representatives of the federal parliament of Nepal. He is the older brother of Deputy House Speaker Shiva Maya Tumbahamphe, and has a PhD in political science from Tribhuwan University. He was a long time member of CPN UML, the party he "deserted" to join Sanghiya Samajwadi Party but returned soon after, and was again appointed to the party's central committee in 2015. He also chaired the subcommittee for Citizenship Bill development formed under the State Affairs and Good Governance Committee of parliament in 2019. He was elected to the parliament in 2017 from CPN UML under the proportional representation system.
