= Nepal Academy of Tourism and Hotel Management =

Hotel management institute in Nepal

- नेपाल पर्यटन तथा होटल ब्‍यवस्थापन प्रतिष्ठान
- Other name: NATHM
- Former names: Hotel Management and Tourism Training Centre (HMTTC)
- Motto: Centre of excellence.
- Type: Public
- Established: 1972
- Affiliations: Tribhuvan University
- Principal: Ram Kailash Bichha
- Director: Sangita Ojha (Joint Secretary)
- Location: Ravi Bhawan, Kathmandu, Nepal
- Campus: Urban
- Website: www.nathm.gov.np

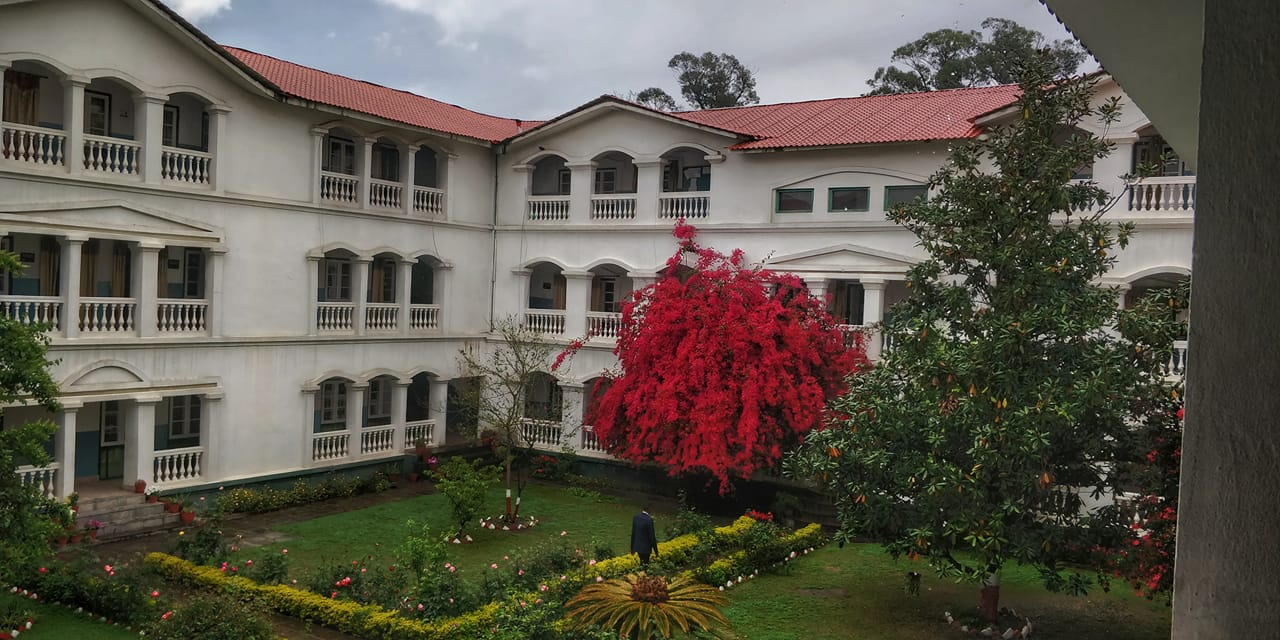
Nepal Academy of Tourism Hotel and Mountaineering (NATHM)

Nepal Academy of Tourism and Hotel Management (NATHM; Nepali: नेपाल पर्यटन तथा होटेल ब्‍यवस्थापन प्रतिष्ठान) is a public hospitality college situated at Ravi Bhawan, Kathmandu. NATHM is operated by The Ministry of Culture, Tourism and Civil Aviation which offers four years bachelors in Travel & Tourism, Hotel Management and Masters in Hospitality Management.

== History ==
Nepal Academy of Tourism and Hotel Management (NATHM) was established in 1972 by the Government of Nepal as Hotel Management and Tourism Training Centre (HMTTC) with the support of UNDP and ILO. After including the Bachelor of Hotel Management (BHM) program for the first time in Nepal in 1999, HMTTC was renamed as NATHM. The academy then launched the Bachelor of Travel and Tourism Management (BTTM) program in 2003.

== Academic programs ==
1. Bachelor of Travel and Tourism Management (BTTM)
2. Bachelor In Hotel Management (BHM)
3. Masters In Hospitality Management (MHM)
4. Tourist Guide Training
5. Trekking Guide Training
6. Liaison officer Training

== Branches ==
NATHM has expanded its branches in 3 places of Nepal.

NATHM has expanded its branch in Birtamode, Jhapa, Banke of Lumbini province and Mahottari of province 2.

== Photo Gallery ==
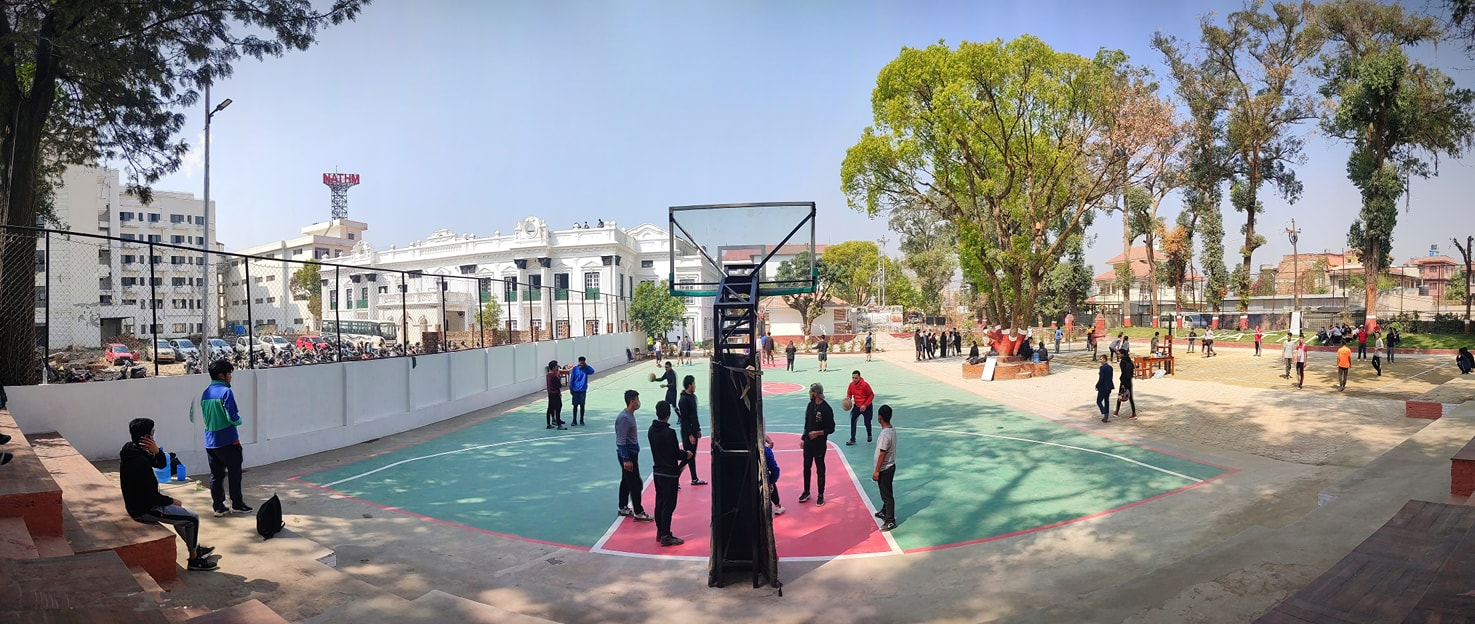
Students Playing Basketball at NATHM ground.

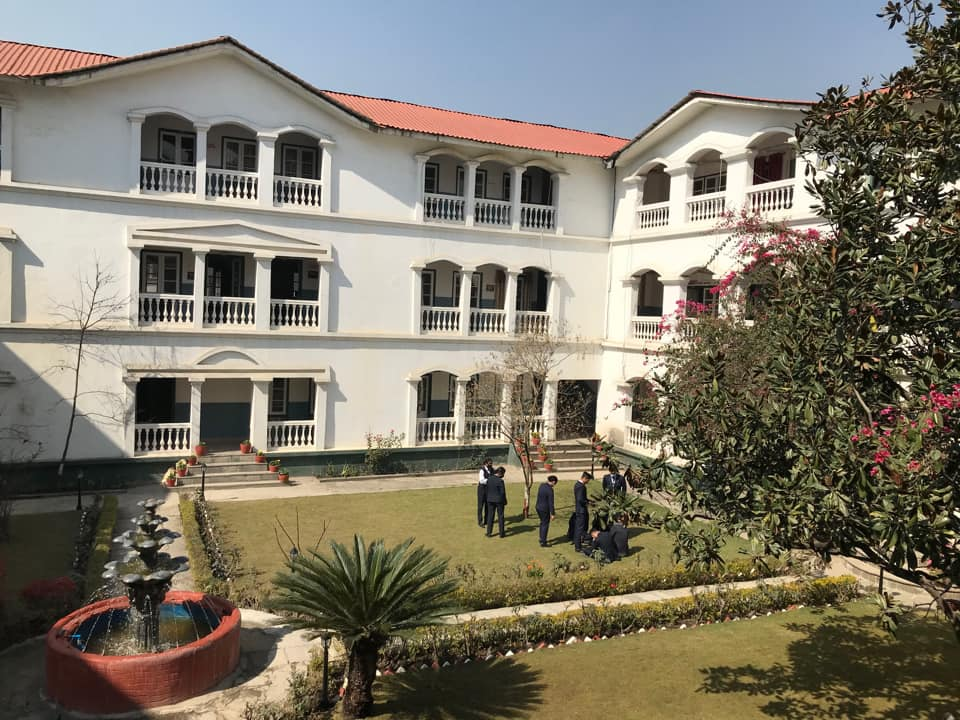
NATHM from Inside

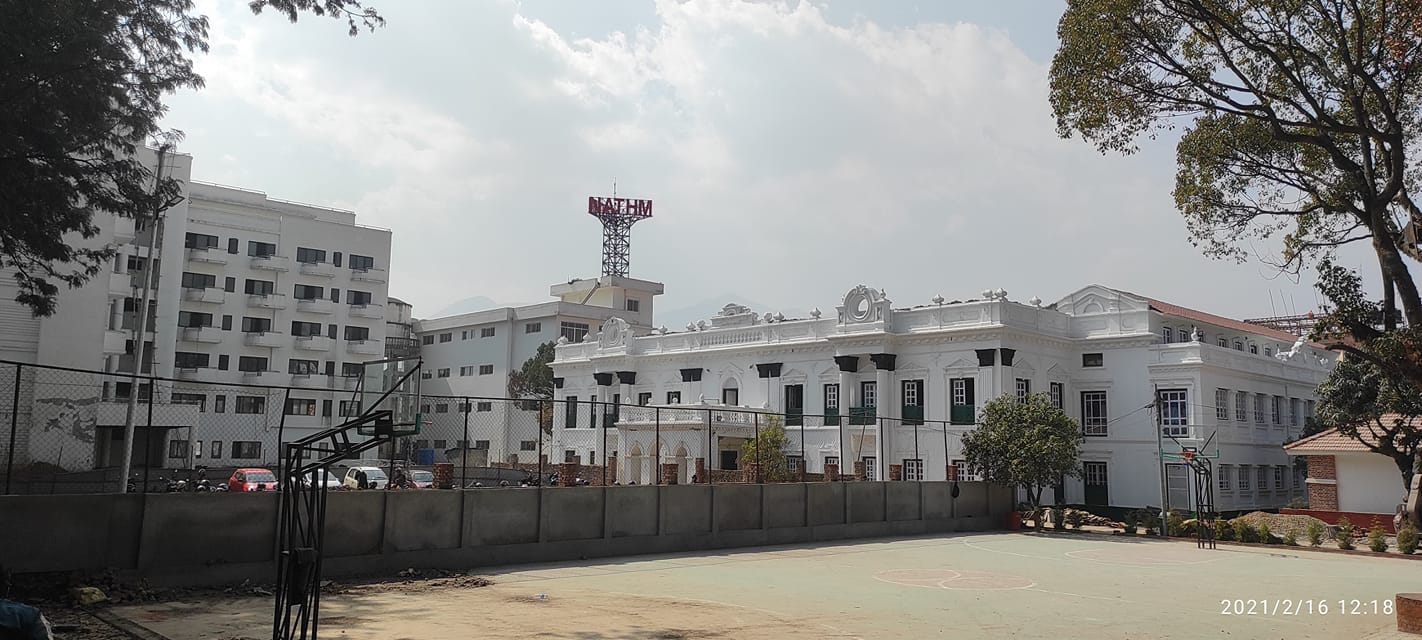
NATHM and its proposed hotel.

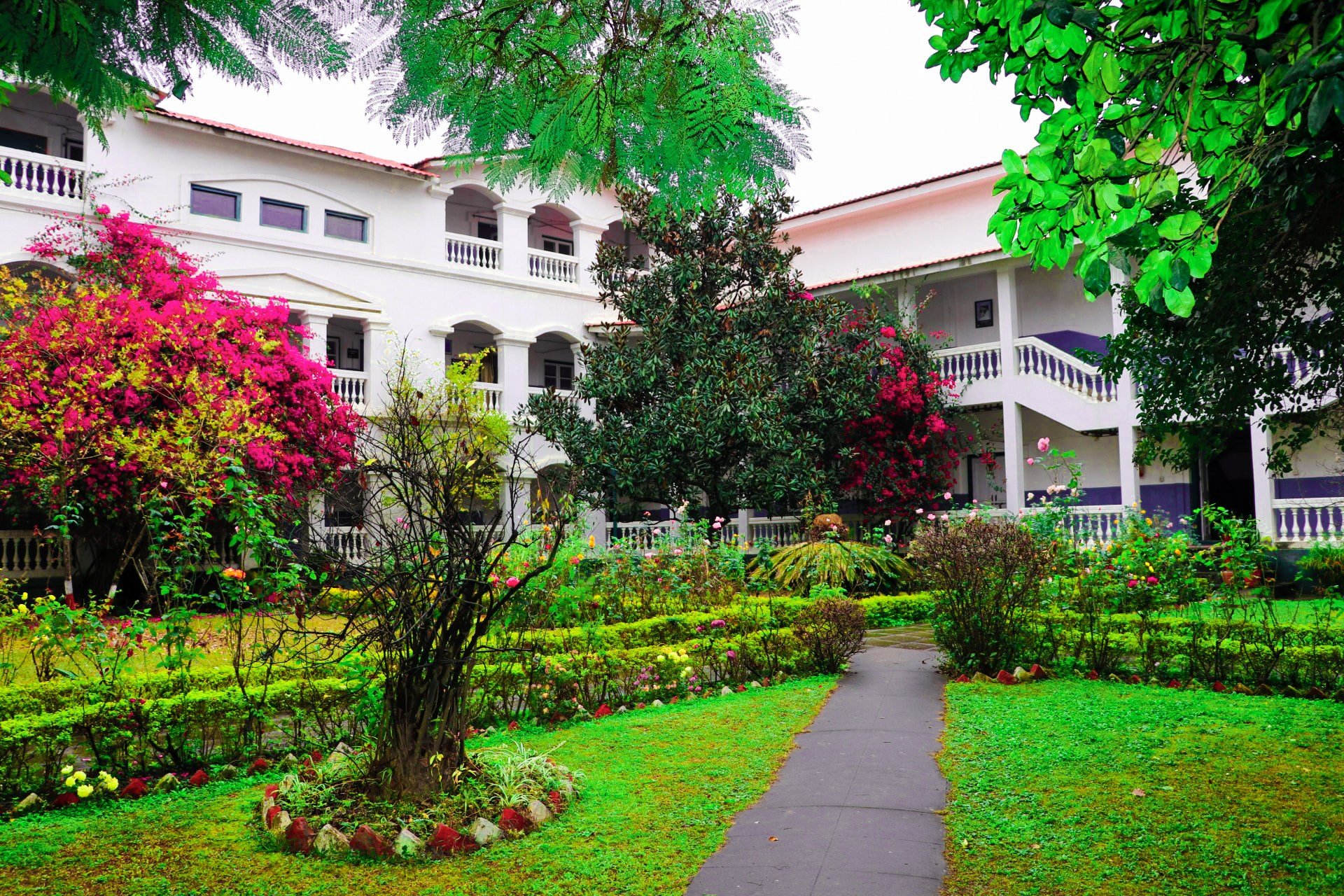
NATHM From Inside

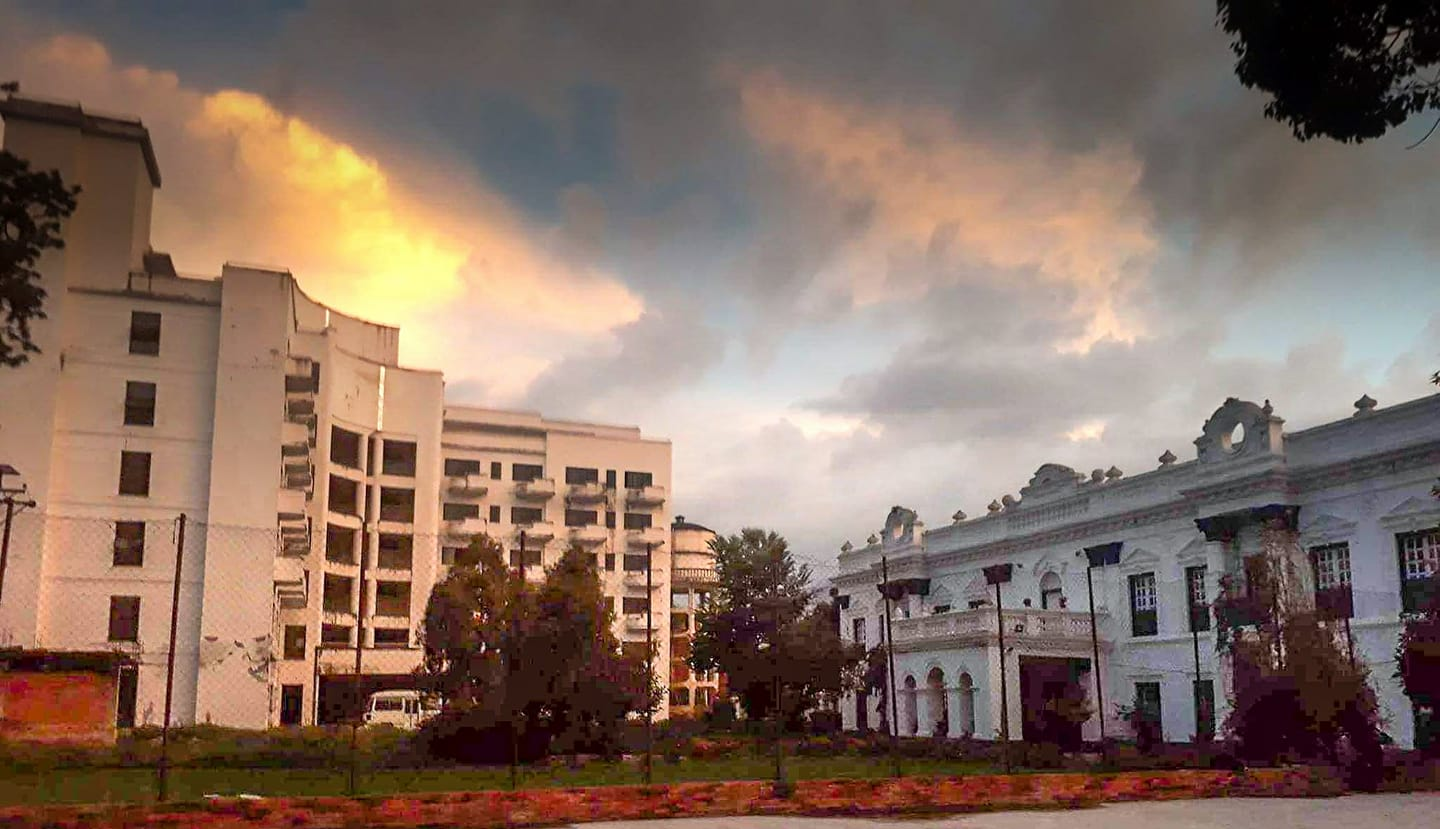
NATHM in evening.

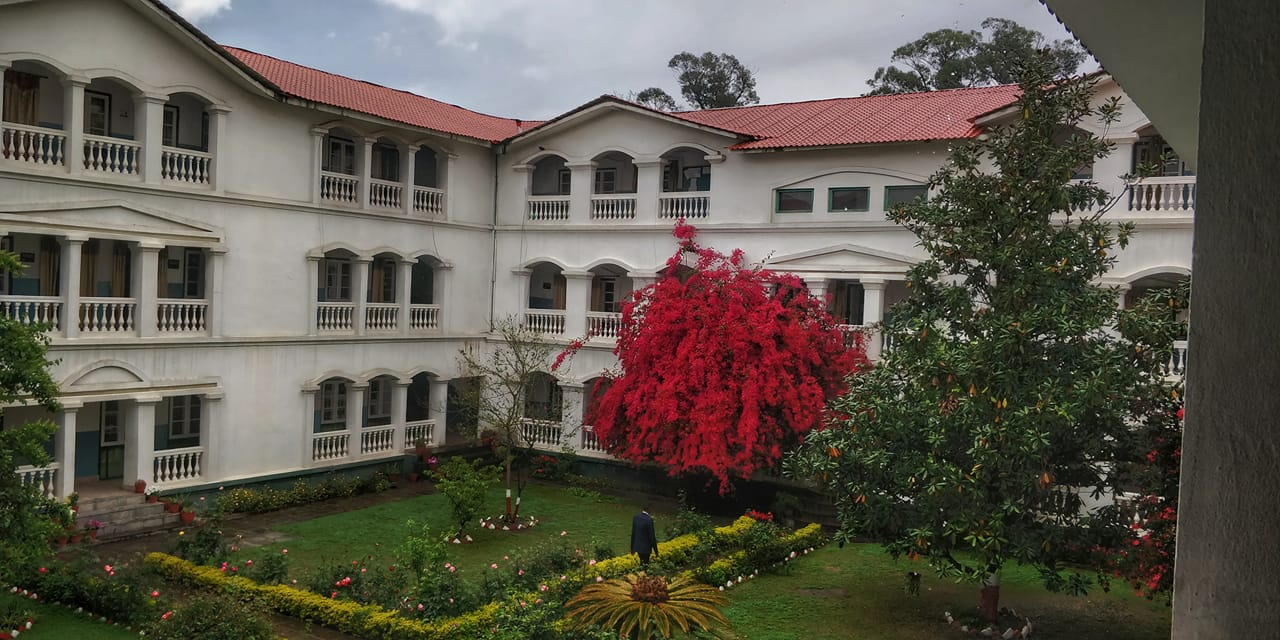
NATHM From Inside

== Notable alumni ==
- Prashant Upreti, Member of Parliament, Rastriya Swatantra Party
