= Third Oli cabinet =

Government of Nepal from May to July 2021

Third Oli Cabinet
- Council of Ministers of Nepal

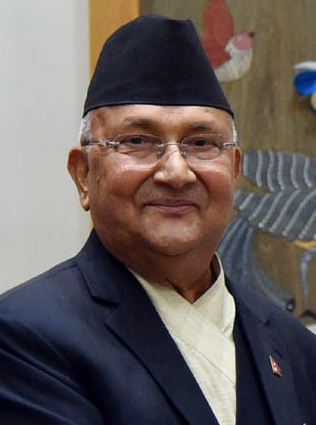
- Date formed: 13 May 2021
- Date dissolved: 13 July 2021

People and organisations
- President: Bidya Devi Bhandari
- Prime Minister: Khadga Prasad Sharma Oli
- Deputy Prime Minister: Bishnu Prasad Paudel
- Total no. of members: 5
- Member parties: CPN (UML)
- Status in legislature: Minority interim government
- Opposition cabinet: Deuba Shadow Cabinet
- Opposition party: Nepali Congress; CPN (Maoist Centre)
- Opposition leader: Sher Bahadur Deuba, NC

History
- Election: 2017 general election
- Legislature term: 1st Federal Parliament
- Predecessor: Second Oli cabinet
- Successor: Fifth Deuba cabinet

KP Sharma Oli was appointed Prime Minister of Nepal for a third time on 13 May 2021 by President Bidya Devi Bhandari, as a minority prime minister, as no opposition party formed a majority government or claimed it time. Citing Article 76 (3) of the constitution, Oli, leading the largest party in the House of Representatives, was re-appointed prime minister, requiring him to again prove a majority in the house within 30 days. On 22 May 2021, the House of Representatives was dissolved for the second time in 6 months by a cabinet decision followed by the approval of the President with elections on 12 and 19 November in two phases.

== After dissolving parliament ==
On 4 June 2021, the cabinet reshuffle took place when the Mahantha-Mahato faction of PSP-N joined the government with 8 cabinet ministers, 2 state ministers, and 5 others from UML. Bishnu Prasad Paudel, Raghubir Mahasheth and Rajendra Mahato were made Deputy Prime-minister. While the previous expansion was yet to be clarified by the Supreme Court, Oli made another reshuffle and included 7 ministers from UML and 1 from PSP-N. On 22 June, the Supreme Court removed Oli's recently appointed ministers, stating article 77(3) of Constitution of Nepal prohibits a caretaker prime-minister from such action.

== Dissolution of cabinet ==
The Supreme Court ordered the President to appoint Sher Bahadur Deuba as the next Prime Minister Of Nepal within 28 hours, citing article 76(5) of the Constitution of Nepal. Similarly, the dissolution of the House of Representatives was disapproved.
