= Prashant Upreti =

Nepalese politician

The Honourable Prashant Upreti
- प्रशान्त उप्रेती

Member of Parliament, Pratinidhi Sabha
- Incumbent
- Assumed office 27 March 2026
- Preceded by: Mahesh Kumar Bartaula
- Constituency: Makwanpur 2

Personal details
- Citizenship: Nepalese
- Party: Rastriya Swatantra Party
- Education: Kathmandu University (M.Ed); NATHM (Tourism Management)
- Profession: Politician

Prashant Upreti (Note: Nepali: प्रशान्त उप्रेती) is a Nepalese politician serving as a member of parliament from the Rastriya Swatantra Party. He is the member of the 7th Pratinidhi Sabha elected from Makwanpur 2 constituency in 2026 Nepalese General Election securing 30,050 votes and defeating his closest contender Mahesh Kumar Bartaula of the CPN UML. At just 25 years old, Upreti became the youngest parliamentarian in political history of Nepal.

He worked as a secretariat for Kathmandu Metropolitan City under then Mayor Balen Shah. He holds M.Ed. from Kathmandu University and Bachelor of Travel and Tourism Management from the Nepal Academy of Tourism and Hotel Management.

== Electoral performance ==
Election	Year	Constituency	Contested for	Political party	Result	Votes	% of votes	Ref.
Nepal general election	2026	Makwanpur 2	Pratinidhi Sabha member	Rastriya Swatantra Party	Won	30,050	35.09%	
