= Makwanpur 2 =

Parliamentary constituency in Bagmati Province, Nepal

- Parliamentary constituency
- Makwanpur 2 in Bagmati Province
- Province: Bagmati Province
- District: Makwanpur District

Current constituency
- Created: 1991
- Party: Rastriya Swatantra Party
- Member of Parliament: Prashant Upreti

Makwanpur 2 is one of two parliamentary constituencies of Makwanpur District in Nepal. This constituency came into existence on the Constituency Delimitation Commission (CDC) report submitted on 31 August 2017.

== Incorporated areas ==
Makwanpur 2 parliamentary constituency incorporates Raksirang Rural Municipality, Kailash Rural Municipality, Indrasarowar Rural Municipality, Thaha Municipality, Manahari Rural Municipality, Bhimphedi Rural Municipality, wards 5–8 Makawanpurgadhi Rural Municipality and, wards 1, 3, 11 and 19 of Hetauda Sub-metropolitan City.

== Assembly segments ==
It encompasses the following Bagmati Provincial Assembly segment

- Makwanpur 2(A)
- Makwanpur 2(B)

== Members of Parliament ==
=== Parliament/Constituent Assembly ===
| Election | Member | Party |
|---|---|---|
| 1991 | Birodh Khatiwada | CPN (Unified Marxist–Leninist) |
| 2008 | Prem Bahadur Pulami | CPN (Maoist) |
| January 2009 | Prem Bahadur Pulami | UCPN (Maoist) |
| 2013 | Subhas Chandra Shahi Thakuri | CPN (Unified Marxist–Leninist) |
| 2017 | Birodh Khatiwada | CPN (Unified Marxist–Leninist) |
| May 2018 | Birodh Khatiwada | Nepal Communist Party |
| March 2021 | Birodh Khatiwada | CPN (Unified Marxist–Leninist) |
| August 2021 | Birodh Khatiwada | CPN (Unified Socialist) |
| 2022 | Mahesh Kumar Bartaula | CPN (Unified Marxist–Leninist) |
| 2026 | Prashant Upreti | Rastriya Swatantra Party |

=== Provincial Assembly ===
==== 2(A) ====
| Election | Member | Party |
|---|---|---|
| 2017 | Kumari Moktan | CPN (Maoist Centre) |
| May 2018 | Kumari Moktan | Nepal Communist Party |

==== 2(B) ====
| Election | Member | Party |
|---|---|---|
| 2017 | Indra Bahadur Baniya | Nepali Congress |

== Election results ==
=== Election in the 2020s ===
==== 2022 general election ====
| Candidate | Party | Votes | % |
|---|---|---|---|
| Mahesh Kumar Bartaula | CPN (UML) | 34,950 | 42.47 |
| Birodh Khatiwada | CPN (Unified Socialist) | 30,432 | 36.98 |
| Bharat Parajuli | Rastriya Swatantra Party | 12,059 | 14.65 |
| Rajan Mainali | Rastriya Prajatantra Party | 2,196 | 2.67 |
| Uddhav Prasad Adhikari | CPN (Marxist–Leninist) | 1,807 | 2.20 |
| Others | | 850 | 1.03 |
| Total | | 82,294 | 100.00 |
| Majority | | 4,518 | |
| CPN (UML) gain | | | |

=== Election in the 2010s ===
==== 2017 legislative elections ====
| Party | Candidate | Votes |
|---|---|---|
| CPN (Unified Marxist–Leninist) | Birodh Khatiwada | 46,481 |
| Nepali Congress | Mahalaxmi Upadhyaya | 34,090 |
| Others | | 2,074 |
| Invalid votes | | 4,141 |
| Result | CPN (UML) hold | |
Source: Election Commission

==== 2017 Nepalese provincial elections ====
===== Makwanpur 2(A) =====
| Party | Candidate | Votes |
|---|---|---|
| CPN (Maoist Centre) | Kumari Muktan | 27,243 |
| Nepali Congress | Yatiraj Sapkota | 14,125 |
| CPN (Marxist–Leninist) | Aite Singh Dimdung | 1,694 |
| Others | | 1,383 |
| Invalid votes | | 2,094 |
| Result | Maoist Centre gain | |
Source: Election Commission

===== Makwanpur 4 2013 election result =====
| Party | Candidate | Votes |
|---|---|---|
| Nepali Congress | Uma Dahal | 10,245 |
| CPN (Unified Marxist–Leninist) | Raja Ram Syangtal | 12,443 |
| Others | | 8,252 |
| Invalid votes | | 1,735 |
| Result | UML gain | |
Source: Election Commission

==== 2013 Constituent Assembly election ====
| Party | Candidate | Votes |
|---|---|---|
| CPN (Unified Marxist–Leninist) | Subhas Chandra Shahi Thakuri | 11,711 |
| UCPN (Maoist) | Narayan Kaji Shrestha | 10,740 |
| Nepali Congress | Jayaram Lamichhane | 8,477 |
| Rastriya Prajatantra Party Nepal | Bhim Bahadur Bomjan | 1,075 |
| Others | | 1,700 |
| Result | CPN (UML) gain | |
Source: NepalNews

=== Election in the 2000s ===
==== 2008 Constituent Assembly election ====
| Party | Candidate | Votes |
|---|---|---|
| CPN (Maoist) | Prem Bahadur Pulami | 16,976 |
| CPN (Unified Marxist–Leninist) | Bir Bahadur Lama | 10,221 |
| Janamorcha Nepal | Jyoti Rayamajhi | 3,046 |
| Nepali Congress | Bhim Lama | 2,834 |
| CPN (Marxist–Leninist) | Bidyut Bajracharya | 2,191 |
| Rastriya Prajatantra Party | Bhim Bahadur Bomjan | 1,490 |
| Others | | 1,056 |
| Invalid votes | | 2,186 |
| Result | Maoist gain | |
Source: Election Commission

=== Election in the 1990s ===
==== 1999 legislative elections ====
| Party | Candidate | Votes |
|---|---|---|
| CPN (Unified Marxist–Leninist) | Birodh Khatiwada | 18,281 |
| Rastriya Prajatantra Party | Deepak Singh | 15,901 |
| Nepali Congress | Ram Chandra Aryal | 11,809 |
| CPN (Marxist–Leninist) | Hiranya Lal Shrestha | 1,808 |
| Others | | 1,619 |
| Invalid Votes | | 1,231 |
| Result | CPN (UML) hold | |
Source: Election Commission

==== 1994 legislative elections ====
| Party | Candidate | Votes |
|---|---|---|
| CPN (Unified Marxist–Leninist) | Birodh Khatiwada | 16,144 |
| Rastriya Prajatantra Party | Kamal Thapa | 11,878 |
| Independent | Bishwa Raj Upreti | 4,866 |
| Nepali Congress | Dina Aryal | 3,792 |
| Others | | 1,313 |
| Result | CPN (UML) hold | |
Source: Election Commission

==== 1991 legislative elections ====
| Party | Candidate | Votes |
|---|---|---|
| CPN (Unified Marxist–Leninist) | Birodh Khatiwada | 16,869 |
| Nepali Congress | Mahalaxmi Upadhyaya | 11,576 |
| Result | CPN (UML) gain | |

== See also ==
- List of parliamentary constituencies of Nepal
