= Sita Gurung =

Nepalese politician (born 1976)

Honourable Sita Gurung
- सिता गुरुङ्ग
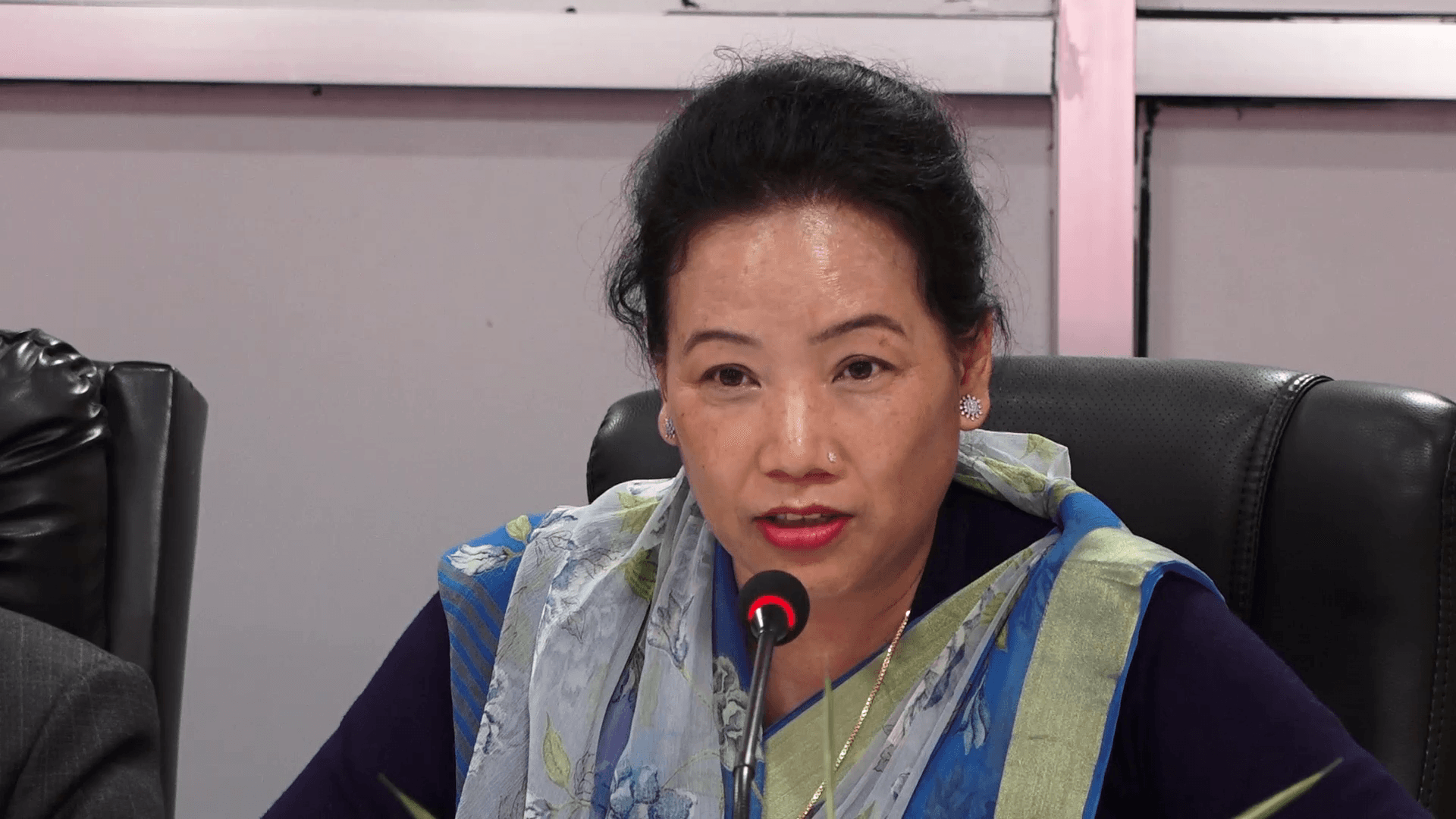

Minister of Urban Development
- In office 31 March 2023 – 4 March 2024
- President: Ram Chandra Poudel
- Prime Minister: Pushpa Kamal Dahal
- Preceded by: Bikram Pandey
- Succeeded by: Dhan Bahadur Buda

Member of Parliament, Pratinidhi Sabha
- Incumbent
- Assumed office 22 December 2022
- Preceded by: Bhawani Prasad Khapung
- Constituency: Tehrathum 1

Personal details
- Born: 12 August 1976 (age 49)
- Party: Nepali Congress
- Parent: Padam Bahadur Gurung (father)
- Education: Tribhuwan University

Sita Gurung is a Nepalese politician, belonging to the Nepali Congress currently serving as a member of the 2nd Federal Parliament of Nepal. In the 2022 Nepalese general election, she won the election from Tehrathum 1 (constituency).
