= Shadow Cabinet of Nepal =

In Nepalese politics, the shadow cabinet is the opposition's equivalent of the federal cabinet.

The last shadow cabinet was formed by main opposition party Nepali Congress on 20 May 2019. Congress President and Parliamentary Party Leader Sher Bahadur Deuba formed 21 ministerial-level coordination committees as per Section 9 (5A) of the Congress Statute. The committees function as a shadow cabinet, while the coordinator of each committee functions as a shadow minister.

== Members ==
Portfolio	Office holder	Committee members

== See also ==
- Leader of the Opposition
- Council of Ministers of Nepal
