= Ram Kumari Jhakri =

Nepali politician

- राम कुमारी झाँक्री

12th Minister of Urban Development
- In office 8 October 2021 – 26 June 2022
- President: Bidya Devi Bhandari
- Prime Minister: Sher Bahadur Deuba
- Preceded by: Prabhu Sah
- Succeeded by: Metmani Chaudhary

Secretary of CPN (Unified Socialist)
- Incumbent
- Assumed office 23 September 2021
- Preceded by: Position created

Member of Parliament, Pratinidhi Sabha for CPN (UML) party list
- In office 4 March 2018 – 25 December 2022

Personal details
- Born: 23 May 1978 (age 48) GULMI District
- Party: CPN (Unified Socialist)
- Other political affiliations: CPN (UML)
- Occupation: politician
- Nickname: Ram KUMARI

Ram Kumari Jhakri (Nepali: रामकुमारी झाँक्री) is a Nepali politician and secretary of CPN (Unified Socialist). She is also the former Minister of Urban Development.

She previously served as a member of House of Representatives. She supports reservation for women in the civil service. On August 21, she has announced that she will be candidate from Gulmi. Jhakri stated that she will break the legacy of UML. Jhankri said she would be the candidate from Gulmi 2 from the 5 party alliance.

== Controversial statements ==
On 4 May 2019, she gave an interview to the talk show Janata Janna Chahanchhan (translation:People Want to Know) on Prime Times Television, in which she criticized her own party leader and prime minister KP Sharma Oli on the government's program for the fiscal year 2019-20. She said the prime minister's programs were an insult to republicanism. She had also been critical of finance minister Yubaraj Khatiwada in the past.

== Political life ==
=== Early political career ===
She is the first woman to be elected president of a major party affiliate student union. As the president of ANNFSU, she was one of the central figures protesting during the 2006 democracy movement in Nepal.

== See also ==
- CPN (Unified Socialist)
