= Raghuji Pant =

Nepalese politician

Minister for Education, Science and Technology
- In office 24 April 2025 – 9 September 2025
- President: Ram Chandra Poudel
- Prime Minister: KP Sharma Oli
- Preceded by: Bidya Bhattarai
- Succeeded by: Mahabir Pun

Minister for Labour and Transportation Management
- In office 5 July 2004 – 1 February 2005
- Monarch: Gyanendra
- Prime Minister: Sher Bahadur Deuba
- Preceded by: Prakash Chandra Lohani
- Succeeded by: Ram Narayan Singh

Member of Parliament, Pratinidhi Sabha
- In office 22 December 2022 – 12 September 2025
- Constituency: Party list (proportional representation)
- In office November 1994 – April 2008
- Preceded by: Lila Mani Pokharel
- Succeeded by: Pampha Bhusal
- Constituency: Lalitpur 3

Personal details
- Party: CPN (UML)
- Occupation: Journalist, author

Raghuji Pant (रघुजी पन्त) is a Nepalese politician who served as the Minister for Education, Science, and Technology until 9 September 2025. A veteran figure in Nepali politics, his career is rooted in journalism before his formal entry into the political sphere. He is a long-standing member of the Communist Party of Nepal (Unified Marxist-Leninist) (CPN-UML), having held various significant roles within the party structure.

== Early life and education ==
Details regarding Raghuji Pant's exact birthdate and place of birth are not readily available in publicly accessible sources, including parliamentary records. Similarly, he has not completed his higher secondary education. While the surname "Pant" is noted as a common Brahmin surname in Nepal and parts of India, specific details about his family roots are not available in the reviewed materials.

== Professional career ==
Pant began his professional career in journalism in 1975, a field he remained in for nearly two decades. During this time, he contributed to several Nepali publications, including Budhabar Weekly, Chhalphal Weekly, Nawayug Monthly, and Yugdhara (Red). He was also involved with the Federation of Nepali Journalists. His extensive experience in the media likely provided him with significant insights into Nepali society and politics.

== Political career ==
Pant formally entered politics in 1994 with his appointment as a press advisor to Prime Minister Man Mohan Adhikari. In 1997, he was elected as a central member of the CPN-UML during the party's general convention in Nepalgunj. He was subsequently elected to the House of Representatives in 1999, representing the Lalitpur constituency no. 3.

In April 2008, he contested the Lalitpur-3 seat in the Constituent Assembly election, but was defeated by the Maoist candidate Pampha Bhusal.

During a period of internal factionalism within the CPN-UML in 2021, pant aligned himself with KP Sharma Oli, despite having voiced criticisms of Oli in the past. He ultimately opposed the party's split. He is also recognized as a significant figure within the faction aligned with Madhav Nepal, indicating complex and evolving relationships within the party.

Pant was re-elected as a central member of the CPN-UML in both 1997 and 2002. He was also elected to the House of Representatives again in December 2022. Within the UML, he has held various key organizational roles, including heading the central departments for culture, water and energy, law, social service, and publicity. As of April 2025, he heads the culture department and is a Standing Committee Member of the party.

=== Ministerial roles ===
Pant served as the Minister for Labour and Transport in 2004. During this tenure, he addressed the issue of Nepali workers being held hostage in Iraq. In April 2025, he was appointed as the Minister for Education, Science, and Technology. In this role, his immediate focus has been on engaging with protesting teachers and addressing the stalled School Education Bill through dialogue.

=== Parliamentary engagement ===
Pant has been an active participant in parliamentary discourse. Notable interventions include his strong opposition in March 2025 against the increasing demands for the restoration of the monarchy, his call in June 2023 for the government to clarify its position on non-aligned foreign policy and concerns regarding secularism, and his urging in September 2023 for the prioritization of direct flights to China and Belt and Road Initiative (BRI) projects. He has consistently reaffirmed his party's commitment to the existing constitution and the rights of parliamentarians.

== Areas of expertise and activities ==
Pant's long-standing leadership of the UML's central department of culture indicates his expertise in Nepali culture and heritage. His previous leadership of the department encompassing water and energy suggests involvement in these development sectors. His engagement with foreign policy issues and his current role as Minister for Education, Science, and Technology highlight his broad range of interests and involvement in key areas of national development. His background in journalism provides him with a strong understanding of media and public communication.

== Published works and public output ==
As a journalist for nearly two decades, pant contributed significantly to Nepali news and political analysis through his articles in various weekly and monthly publications. While specific titles are not detailed in the reviewed sources, his extensive career suggests a substantial body of work. His statements as a minister and his interventions in Parliament also constitute his public output, contributing to national discourse on various issues.

== Honors and recognition ==
In September 2024, Pant was honored by President Ram Chandra Paudel at an event commemorating the 55th anniversary of the Press Council Nepal for his contributions to Nepali journalism.

== Impact and legacy ==
Raghuji Pant's long and influential career within the CPN-UML and Nepali politics has seen him contribute to the party's policy direction and national discourse. His firm stance against the restoration of the monarchy and his active participation in parliamentary debates on key national issues have shaped political discussions. His current role as Minister of Education, Science, and Technology presents an opportunity to leave a significant legacy in Nepal's education sector.

In April 2025, as Minister of Education, Science and Technology, Pant played a key role in resolving the 2025 Nepal Teachers Protest, a month-long nationwide protest by public school teachers. Following negotiations under his leadership, the government and Nepal Teachers' Federation reached a nine-point agreement on 30 April 2025, which led to the suspension of the strike.

== Critical perspectives and public opinion ==
Pant has faced public criticism, notably in 2021 for misogynistic remarks, for which he later apologized. His strong stance against the monarchy has also led to clashes in Parliament. His appointment as Education Minister comes at a time of significant challenges in the education sector, placing him under public scrutiny regarding his ability to address these issues. His public disagreements on policy matters have also drawn attention and varying opinions.

== Timeline of key positions ==
Year	Position/Role	Organization/Institution
1975 onwards	Budhabar Weekly, Chhalphal Weekly, Nawayug Monthly, Yugdhara (Red), Federation of Nepali Journalists	
1994	Press Advisor	Prime Minister Man Mohan Adhikari
1997	Central Committee Member	CPN-UML
1999	Member of the House of Representatives	Parliament of Nepal
2002	Central Committee Member	CPN-UML
2004	Minister for Labour and Transport	Government of Nepal
2006	Member of the reinstated Parliament	Parliament of Nepal
2022	Member of the House of Representatives	Parliament of Nepal
2025	Minister for Education, Science, and Technology	Government of Nepal
Ongoing	Head of the Culture Department	CPN-UML
Ongoing	Standing Committee Member	CPN-UML
