= Israel–Nepal relations =

- Israel: Nepal

Diplomatic mission
- Embassy of Israel, Kathmandu: Embassy of Nepal, Tel Aviv

Embassy of Israel in Kathmandu
- Coordinates: 27°43′20″N 85°19′18″E
- Opened: March 1961
- Ambassador: H.E. Shmulik Arie Bass
- Jurisdiction: Nepal
- Website: https://new.embassies.gov.il/nepal/en

Embassy of Nepal, Tel Aviv, Israel
- Location: Textile Center Building
- Address: 14th Floor, 2 Kaufman St. Tel Aviv, Israel, 6801294
- Coordinates: 32.06308144264223°N 34.761974082099194°E
- Opened: August 13, 2007
- Ambassador: HE Prof. Dhan Prasad Pandit
- Jurisdiction: Israel; Cyprus
- Website: https://new.embassies.gov.il/nepal/en

Israel–Nepal relations refer to the bilateral ties between the State of Israel and Nepal. The two countries established diplomatic relations on 1 June 1960, making Nepal the third country in South Asia to recognize Israel behind Ceylon (now Sri Lanka) and India, and the first South Asian state to establish full bilateral ties with it.

B. P. Koirala, the prime minister of Nepal from 1959 to 1960, had a strong pro-Israel foreign policy. Various Nepalese political figures, including the king (formerly), heads of government and state, and ministers have all since visited Israel and continued the earlier foreign policy tilt. With the exception of a nine-month-long period of Maoist rule, all Nepalese governments have generally pursued close bilateral relations with Israel.

== History ==
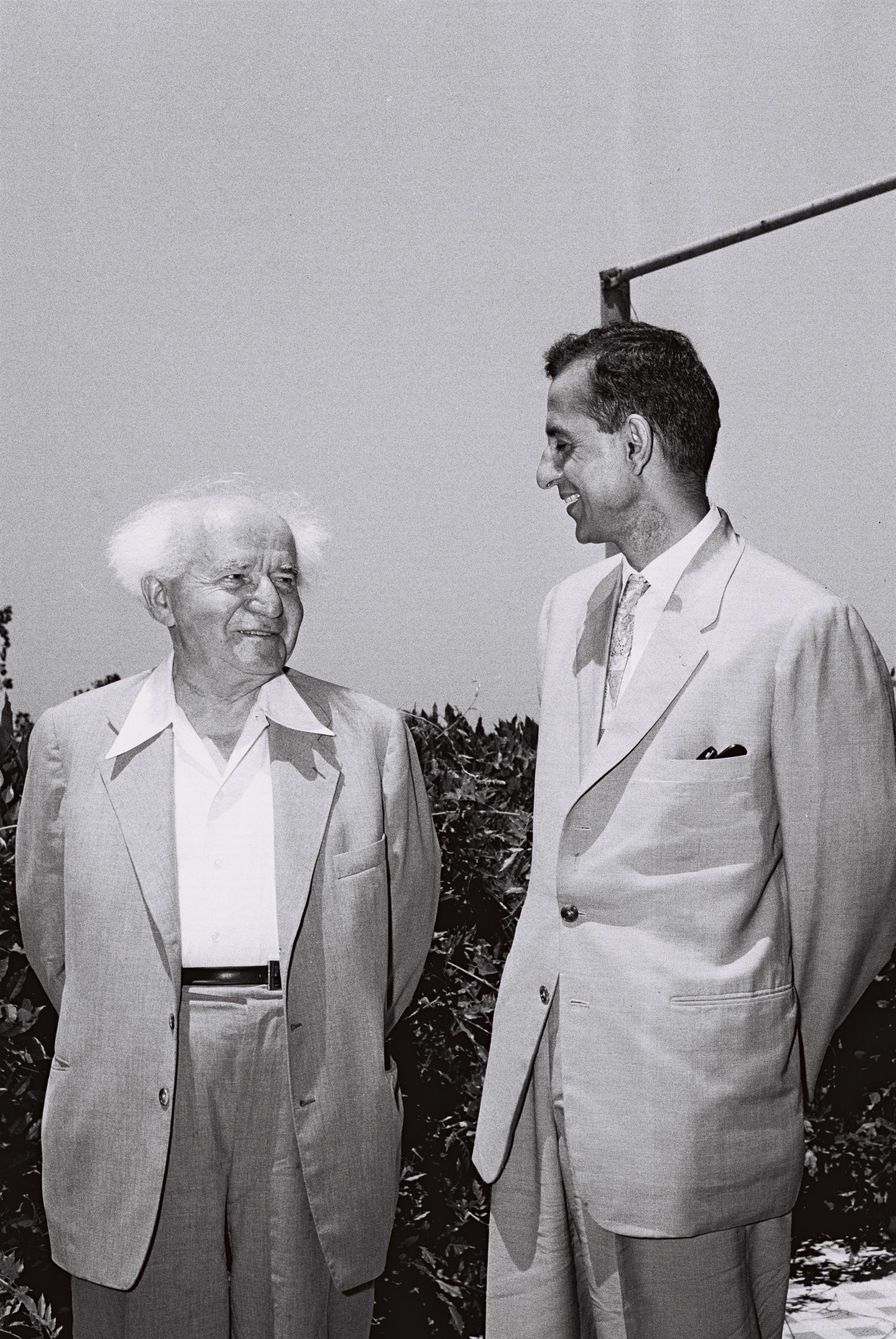
Prime Minister Bishweshwar Prasad Koirala (right) and David Ben Gurion in Tel Aviv on 12 August 1960

Diplomatic relations between Nepal and Israel were established on 1 June 1960. Since the establishment of ties, Nepal has supported Israel internationally. Israel opened its embassy in Kathmandu in March 1961. The Nepalese Ambassador to Egypt was at first accredited to Israel. Nepal also opened the Nepalese honorary consulate general in Israel in 1993 and an embassy in 2007. The current Nepalese Ambassador to Israel is Baija Nath Thapalia, who presented his credentials to President Peres on March 19, 2008.

Nepal has maintained support for the right of Israel to exist within secure and internationally recognized boundaries. Nepal voted in favor of Security Council Resolutions 242 (1967) and 338 (1973), which upheld the right of all the states in the region to live in peace. Nepal has also welcomed every initiative from whatever quarter that seeks to resolve the Middle East problems like the Camp David Accords signed between Egypt and Israel in 1978 and the renewed peace process sponsored time to time by countries like the USA.

In 1975, the United Nations General Assembly passed an Arab-sponsored resolution (3379) that equated Zionism with racism and racial discrimination. Nepal expressed its reservation throughout the discussions on the issue and did not support the resolution. In the context of renewed peace in West Asia, the United States took the initiative to introduce a draft resolution to repeal resolution 3379 of 1975 in the 46th Session of the UNGA. A large majority adopted the draft resolution. Nepal voted in favor of the resolution. Israel, the US, and the Western Countries appreciated Nepal's support for the resolution.

Nepal welcomed the historic accord signed between Israel and Palestine Liberation Organization on 13 September 1993 in Washington, D.C., on autonomy for the Palestinians in the Gaza Strip and West Bank town of Jericho and also the agreement signed on 10 September 1993 on mutual recognition of each other. Former Prime Minister Girija Prasad Koirala sent letters of appreciation to Yitzhak Rabin, Prime Minister of Israel, and Yasser Arafat, President and PLO Chairman, for this courageous decision taken by them and expressed hope that this would be instrumental in establishing peace, order, and stability in West Asia.

Nepal welcomed the ceasefire announced after a summit held between Israeli Prime Minister Ariel Sharon and Palestinian Leader Mahmud Abbas in Egypt on February 8, 2005, to end four years of bloodshed.

Nepal opened its embassy in Tel Aviv, Israel on 13 August 2007.

Receiving the credentials of the Nepalese ambassador to Israel, Kanta Rizal, in August 2022, Israeli President Isaac Herzog expressed his desire to boost Israeli-Nepalese cooperation, highlighting agriculture, tourism, and innovation as core issues.

After the April 2015 Nepal earthquake, Israel sent a delegation of 260 personnel, and 95 tons of equipment, including a field hospital.

During the October 7 attacks, which the Nepali government condemned, 10 Nepali students were killed during the Alumim massacre. The government of Nepal, along with 40 other countries that contribute troops to UNIFIL, "strongly condemned" Israeli attacks on UNIFIL bases during the 2024 Israeli invasion of Lebanon.

== Economic Cooperation ==
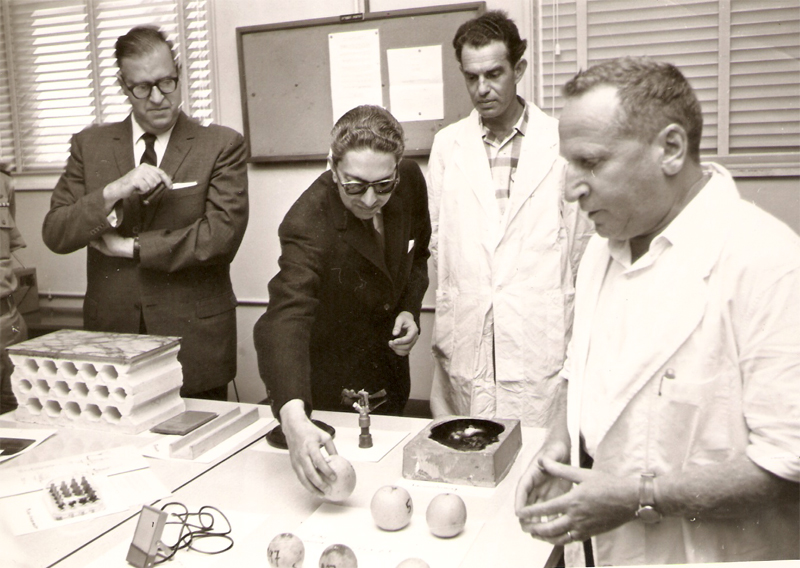
King Mahendra of Nepal (second from left) in a 1958 visit to Israel's Weizmann Institute of Science.

Israel and Nepal have progressing economic ties. Israel has been helping Nepal in the fields of technical specialties and Nepal has been supplying manpower to Israel. The chamber of commerce of both nations have trade links as well. The Israel-Nepal Chamber of Commerce is part of the Israel-Asia Chamber of Commerce and is headed by Anat Bernstein-Reich and Raviv Byron. The Nepal-Israel Chamber of Commerce based in Kathmandu was established in 2020 and a memorandum of understanding to enhance collaboration was signed between the two sister chambers.

Israel has extended cooperation to Nepal in the establishment of the National Construction Company of Nepal and training facilities for the Royal Nepalese Army personnel in parachuting. Israel has been providing Nepal with short-term scholarships in various subjects, particularly in the areas of agriculture, education, rural development, water resources, tourism, etc. Similarly, the Israeli experts in Nepal on farm management, artificial insemination, irrigation, childhood education, workers, and cooperative biotechnology and farm machinery conducted seven on-the-spot courses.

=== Trade ===
A Protocol of Cooperation was signed between the Federation of Nepalese Chambers of Commerce and Industries and the Federation of Israeli Chambers of Commerce in Tel Aviv on 25 June 1993 during the official visit of then Prime Minister Mr. Girija Prasad Koirala to Israel. The trade between Nepal and Israel has remained in favor of Israel. Nepal exported items amounted to Rs 3,175,682 and imported amounted Rs 483,695,044, having a trade deficit of Rs 480,519,362 in fiscal year 2003/04 according to the Trade Promotion Center. On May 21, 2020, an MOU for trade promotion was signed between the Nepal-Israel Chamber of Commerce, based in Nepal, and the Israel-Asia Chamber of Commerce which is the umbrella organization for the Israel-India and Nepal Chamber of Commerce.

=== Expat workers ===
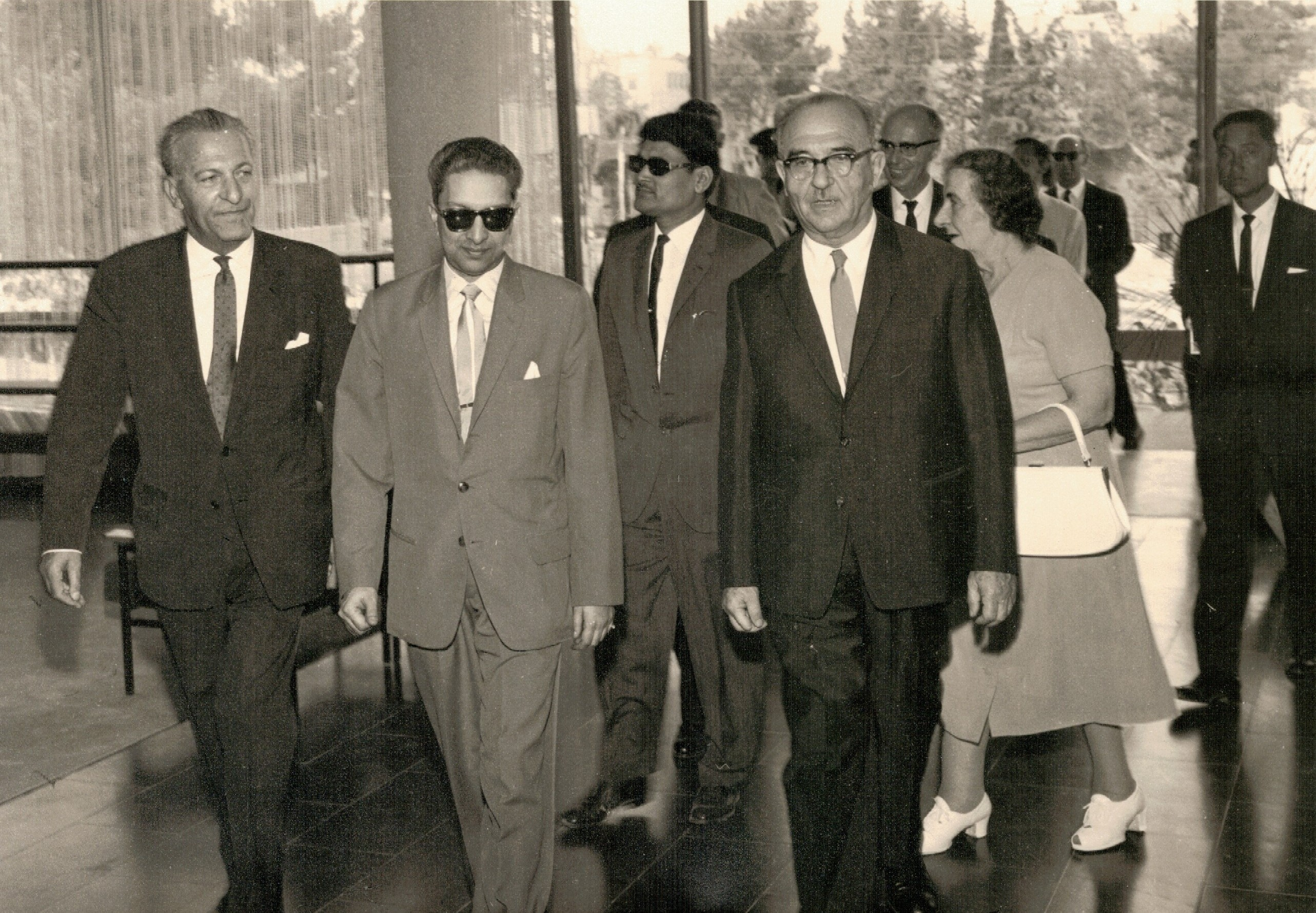
King Mahendra with Prime Minister Levi Eshkol, 1963

A number of Nepalese citizens work in Israel as there is a demand for more workers from Nepal.

It is estimated that about 12,000 Nepalese foreign workers are residing in Israel, most of whom are women working as caregivers.

Israel has clarified it would not allow Nepali workers in its territory due to the ill practices followed by Nepali manpower agents rendering the efforts from the Nepali side to reopen Israel as a labor destination futile.

Israel stopped Nepali workers in April 2009, saying Nepali manpower agents had charged exorbitant fees to the workers, created nexus with Israel-based Nepali brokers, and sent low-skilled workers.

Recently, Israel has clarified to the Nepali mission in Israel, it would not reopen the process of welcoming Nepali workers until the activities of manpower agents are ‘improved’, according to sources at the labor ministry.

== Military relations ==
The Government of Nepal and the Israeli Government signed a bilateral Air Services Agreement (ASA) on November 18, 2002.

== Bilateral Visits ==
Late Prime Minister Mr. BP Koirala paid an official visit to Israel in 1960, which was very important in the context that many countries had not recognized and many had outlawed Israel at that time. After coming to power through a military coup that overthrew the democratic government of BP Koirala, the autocratic monarch of Nepal, Mahendra paid a State Visit to Israel in September 1963, to rally support for his regime. He maintained Koirala's special relationship with Israel. This was returned by Late Israeli President Zalman Shazar's Official Visit to Nepal later. In 1968, Birendra, then Crown Prince, paid a two-week study visit to Israel. Then Foreign Minister of Israel late Moshe Dayan visited Nepal in April 1979.

After the restoration of democracy in 1990, the then Speaker of the House of Representatives, Daman Nath Dhungana, paid an official visit to Israel in January 1992 at the invitation of the Speaker of the Knesset. On 23–25 June 1993, the then Prime Minister of Nepal, Girija Prasad Koirala paid an Official Visit to Israel. Minister of Agriculture and Local Development Ram Chandra Paudel paid an Official Visit to Israel on 17–21 November 1993. Hasta Bahadur Malla, then Assistant Minister of Education visited Israel to participate in the Jerusalem International Conference of Ministers of Education on January 8–11, 1996. Jhala Nath Khanal, then Minister of Communications paid an official visit to Israel on September 16–22, 1997 at the invitation of the Minister of Communication of Israel. Sahana Pradhan, the Foreign Minister of Nepal, visited Israel and met with Tzipi Livni, the Vice Prime Minister and Minister of Foreign Affairs, President Shimon Peres, and Aaron Abramovich, the Director General of the Ministry of Foreign Affairs, on July 12, 2007, the first time the Nepalese Foreign Minister has visited. Pradhan announced Nepal will soon open an embassy in Israel.

== See also ==
- Foreign relations of Israel
- Foreign relations of Nepal
