= Bodhmaya Kumari Yadav =

Nepali politician

- वोधमाया कुमारी यादव

Ministry of Education Science and Technology

Member of Parliament, Pratinidhi Sabha for CPN (Maoist Centre) party list
- Incumbent
- Assumed office 4 March 2018

Personal details
- Born: 24 October 1974 (age 51) Dhanusha District
- Party: CPN (Maoist Centre)
- Occupation: Politician

Bodhmaya Kumari Yadav (also known as Bodh Maya Yadav) is a Nepali politician and a member of the House of Representatives of the federal parliament of Nepal. She was elected through the proportional representation system from CPN MC. In the 2013 elections for the 2nd constituent assembly, she was a candidate from Dhanusa-6 for the first-past-the post-system from the same party but was lost by Nepali Congress. Following the formation of Nepal Communist Party (NCP), she was appointed the central committee member of the party.
