= Gobinda Bandi =

Nepalese politician

Honourable Govinda Bandi
- गोविन्द बन्दी

Minister of Law, Justice and Parliamentary Affairs
- In office 7 April 2022 – 26 December 2022
- President: Bidya Devi Bhandari
- Prime Minister: Sher Bahadur Deuba
- Preceded by: Dilendra Prasad Badu
- Succeeded by: Dhruba Bahadur Pradhan

Personal details
- Party: CPN (Unified Socialist)

Govinda Bandi (Nepali: गोविन्द बन्दी) is a Nepalese politician and former Minister of Law, Justice and Parliamentary Affairs. Previously a senior advocate, Bandi is also the standing committee member of CPN (Unified Socialist).

== See also ==
- CPN (Unified Socialist)
