= Pampha Bhusal =

Nepali politician

- पम्फा भुसाल

Minister of Energy, Water Resources and Irrigation
- In office 12 July 2021 – 26 December 2022
- President: Bidhya Devi Bhandari
- Prime Minister: Sher Bahadur Deuba
- Preceded by: Sharat Singh Bhandari
- Succeeded by: Rajendra Prasad Lingden

Member of Parliament, Pratinidhi Sabha
- In office 4 March 2018 – December 2022
- Preceded by: Madan Bahadur Amatya
- Succeeded by: Toshima Karki
- Constituency: Lalitpur 3

Member of Constituent Assembly
- In office 28 May 2008 – 28 May 2012
- Preceded by: Raghuji Pant
- Succeeded by: Madan Bahadur Amatya
- Constituency: Lalitpur 3

Personal details
- Born: 19 July 1962 (age 63) Kimadanda, Lumbini, Nepal
- Party: CPN (Maoist Centre)
- Other party: CPN (Fourth Convention); CPN (Mashal); Samyukta Janamorcha

Pampha Bhusal (Nepali: पम्फा भुसाल; born 18 July 1962) is a Nepalese politician who has served as an elected member of parliament and the constitutional assembly as well as a minister several times. She was the second woman to lead a political party in Nepal after Sahana Pradhan; she was the leader of the United Peoples’ Front (Samyukta Janamorcha) c. 1994. She was the Minister for Energy, Water Resources and Irrigation from 2021 to 2022 in the newly formed cabinet under Prime Minister Sher Bahadur Deuba.

== Early life and career ==
Bhusal was born 1962 in Kimdada, a remote village in Arghakhanchi.

She entered student politics in 1977 when she was studying in the eighth grade, and four years later, in 1981, she took active membership of the Communist Party of Nepal.
