= Madan Bahadur Amatya =

Nepalese politician

- मदन बहादुर अमात्य
- Incumbent
- Assumed office 2013
- Constituency: Lalitpur-3

Personal details
- Party: Nepali Congress

Madan Bahadur Amatya (Nepali: मदन बहादुर अमात्य) is a member of 2nd Nepalese Constituent Assembly. He won Lalitpur–3 seat in 2013 Nepalese Constituent Assembly election from Nepali Congress.
