= Bhawani Prasad Khapung =

Nepalese politician

Honourable Bhawani Prasad Khapung
- भवानी प्रसाद खापुङ

Minister of Health and Population
- In office 27 June 2022 – 17 January 2023
- President: Bidhya Devi Bhandari
- Prime Minister: Sher Bahadur Deuba
- Preceded by: Birodh Khatiwada
- Succeeded by: Padam Giri

Minister of State of Health and Population
- In office 8 October 2021 – 27 June 2022
- Prime Minister: Sher Bahadur Deuba
- Preceded by: Nawaraj Rawat
- Succeeded by: Toshima Karki

Member of Parliament, Pratinidhi Sabha
- Incumbent
- Assumed office 4 March 2018
- Constituency: Tehrathum 1

Member of Constituent Assembly
- In office 21 January 2014 – 14 October 2017
- Preceded by: Tulsi Subba
- Constituency: Tehrathum 1

Personal details
- Born: 5 October 1961 (age 64)
- Party: CPN (United)
- Other political affiliations: CPN (UML); CPN (Unified Socialist)

Bhawani Prasad Khapung (Nepali: भवानीप्रसाद खापुङ) (born 5 October 1961) is a Nepali politician. He was elected as a Member of Parliament (MP) in the House of Representatives from Terathum 1 (constituency) in the 2017 General Election. He is a member of the CPN (United).

== See also ==
- CPN (United)
