= Toshima Karki =

Nepali politician

Honourable Toshima Karki
- तोसिमा कार्की
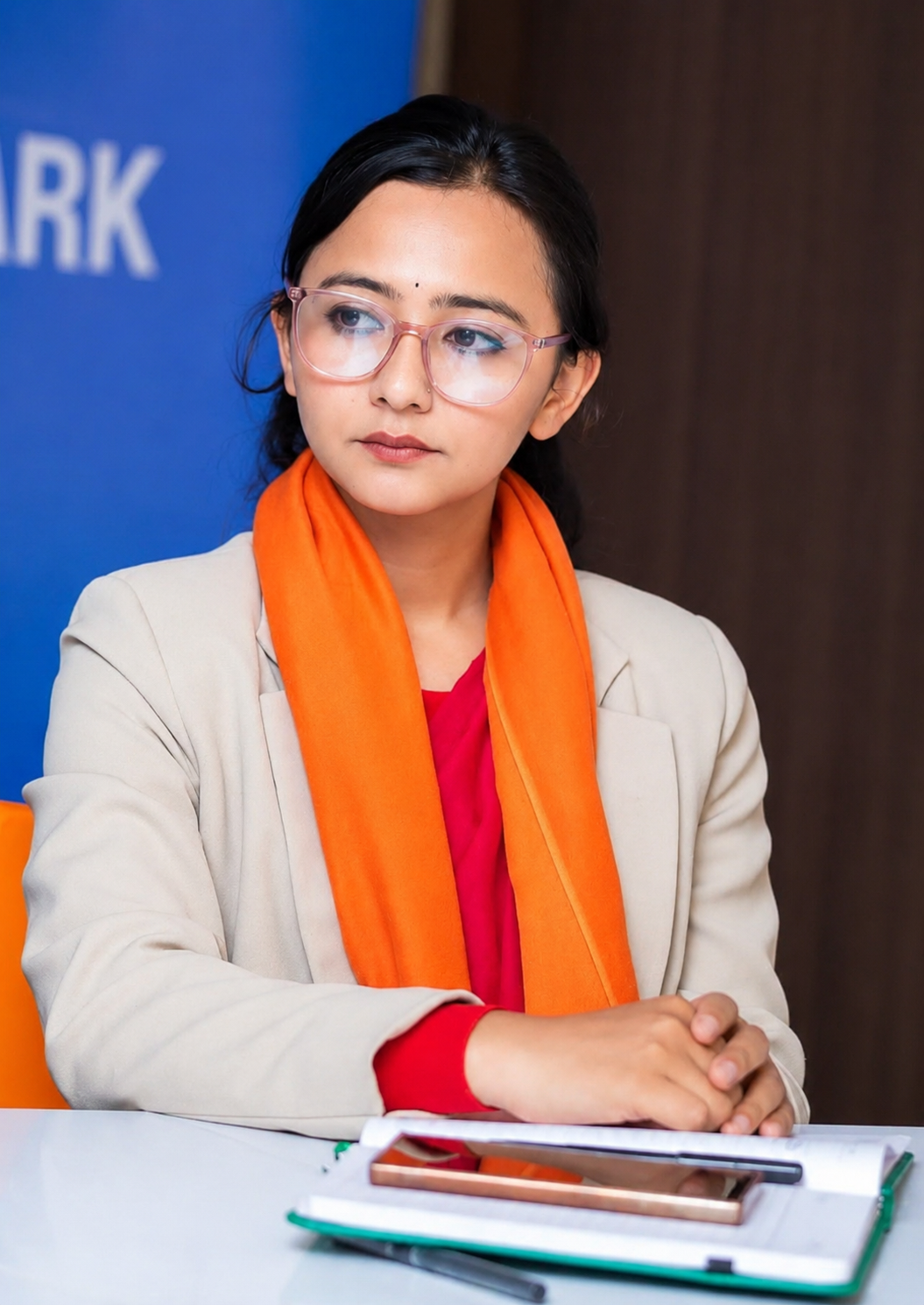
- Karki in 2023

Minister of State for Health and Population
- In office 17 January 2023 – 5 February 2023
- President: Bidhya Devi Bhandari
- Prime Minister: Pushpa Kamal Dahal
- Minister: Padam Giri
- Preceded by: Hira Chandra KC

Member of the Parliament, Pratinidhi Sabha
- Incumbent
- Assumed office 26 March 2026
- President: Ram Chandra Paudel
- Preceded by: Herself
- Constituency: Lalitpur 3
- In office 22 December 2022 – 12 September 2025
- Preceded by: Pampha Bhusal

Personal details
- Born: 20 May 1990 (age 36) Nawalparasi, Nepal; Permanent Address: Lalitpur-18
- Party: Rastriya Swatantra Party
- Education: MS General Surgery (KU); MBBS (KISTMCTH, IOM)
- Profession: Surgeon; Social Activist
- Website: toshimakarki.com

Toshima Karki (Note: Nepali: तोसिमा कार्की) (born 20 May 1990) is a Nepalese politician, surgeon, and central committee member of the Rastriya Swatantra Party. Karki served as the Minister of State at the Ministry of Health and Population (Nepal) from January to February 2023. She was first elected to the House of Representatives in the 2022 Nepalese general election from Lalitpur 3. She was re-elected from the same constituency in the 2026 Nepalese general election.

== Early life and education ==
Born in Nawalparasi district, Karki pursued an MBBS degree from KIST College and General Surgery from Kathmandu University School of Medical Sciences.

== Professional and political career ==
She served as a lecturer in surgery at the Patan Academy of Health Sciences before filing her candidacy for the House of Representatives from Lalitpur 3. She was also an elected member of the executive committee at Nepal Medical Council (NMC) until she resigned from the post on 4 December 2022, following her electoral win. Her candidacy was initially rejected by the Election Commission of Nepal, citing her NMC member post as a position of profit. She filed a writ petition at the Supreme Court which upheld her candidacy.

== Electoral history ==
In the 2026 Nepalese general election, she was re-elected from the Lalitpur 3 constituency.

Candidate	Party	Votes	%
Toshima Karki	Rastriya Swatantra Party	43,096	64.40
Jitendra Kumar Shrestha	Nepali Congress	9,045	13.52
Raj Kaji Maharjan	Nepal Communist Party	6,022	9.00
Sandan Thapa Magar	CPN (UML)	3,297	4.93
Sabin Kumar Khadka	Rastriya Prajatantra Party	2,037	3.04
Others		3,422	5.11
Total		66,919	100.00
Rastriya Swatantra Party hold			

In the 2022 Nepalese general election, she was elected from the Lalitpur 3 constituency.

Candidate	Party	Votes	%
Toshima Karki	Rastriya Swatantra Party	31,136	53.55
Amrit Khadka	CPN (UML)	12,963	22.29
Pampha Bhusal	CPN (Maoist Centre)	8,769	15.08
Niranjan Thapa	Rastriya Prajatantra Party	2,130	3.66
Rajaram Tandukar	Hamro Nepali Party	1,554	2.67
Others		1,593	2.74
Total		58,145	100.00
Majority		18,173	
Rastriya Swatantra Party gain			

== See also ==
- Rastriya Swatantra Party
