= Birodh Khatiwada =

Nepali politician

- विरोध खतिवडा

Minister of Health and Population
- In office 8 October 2021 – 27 June 2022
- President: Bidhya Devi Bhandari
- Prime Minister: Sher Bahadur Deuba
- Preceded by: Hridayesh Tripathi
- Succeeded by: Bhawani Prasad Khapung

Member of House of Representatives
- In office 4 March 2018 – 17 September 2022
- Preceded by: Subhas Chandra Shahi Thakuri
- Constituency: Makwanpur 2
- In office May 1991 – May 1999
- Preceded by: Constituency created
- Succeeded by: Prem Bahadur Pulami
- Constituency: Makwanpur 2

Personal details
- Born: 21 February 1950 (age 76) Hetauda, Nepal
- Party: Communist Party of Nepal (Maoist Centre)
- Other political affiliations: CPN (UML); CPN (Unified Socialist)
- Spouse: Munu Sigdel
- Children: Shrinkhala Khatiwada Bimba Khatiwada
- Occupation: Politician

Birodh Khatiwada is a Nepalese politician belonging to Nepal Communist Party. He was also a member of the House of Representatives from Makwanpur 2 constituency.

Khatiwada was the Minister for Health and Population of Nepal.

== Personal life ==
He is the father of Miss Nepal 2018 Shrinkhala Khatiwada. His wife Munu Sigdel Khatiwada was also a member of CPN (Unified Socialist) and member of Provincial Assembly of Province No. 3.

== Electoral history ==
=== 2017 general elections ===
Makwanpur 2
Party	Candidate	Votes
CPN (Unified Marxist–Leninist)	Birodh Khatiwada	46,481
Nepali Congress	Mahalaxmi Upadhyaya	34,090
Others		2,074
Invalid votes		4,141
Result	CPN (UML) hold	
Source: Election Commission

=== 1999 legislative elections ===
Makwanpur 2
Party	Candidate	Votes
CPN (Unified Marxist–Leninist)	Birodh Khatiwada	18,281
Rastriya Prajatantra Party	Deepak Singh	15,901
Nepali Congress	Ram Chandra Aryal	11,809
CPN (Marxist–Leninist)	Hiranya Lal Shrestha	1,808
Others		1,619
Invalid Votes		1,231
Result	CPN (UML) hold	
Source: Election Commission

=== 1994 legislative elections ===
Makwanpur 2
Party	Candidate	Votes
CPN (Unified Marxist–Leninist)	Birodh Khatiwada	16,144
Rastriya Prajatantra Party	Kamal Thapa	11,878
Independent	Bishwa Raj Upreti	4,866
Nepali Congress	Dina Aryal	3,792
Others		1,313
Result	CPN (UML) hold	
Source: Election Commission

=== 1991 legislative elections ===
Makwanpur 2
Party	Candidate	Votes
CPN (Unified Marxist–Leninist)	Birodh Khatiwada	16,869
Nepali Congress	Mahalaxmi Upadhyaya	11,576
Result	CPN (UML) gain	

== See also ==
- CPN (Unified Socialist)
