= Office of the Prime Minister and Council of Ministers =

Government ministry of Nepal

- प्रधानमन्त्री तथा मन्त्रिपरिषद्को कार्यालय
- Emblem of Nepal

Federal Executive Agency overview
- Formed: 18 February 1951
- Jurisdiction: Government of Nepal
- Headquarters: Singha Durbar, Kathmandu
- Minister responsible: Balendra Shah, Prime Minister
- Federal Executive Agency executive: Govdinda Bahadur Karki, Chief Secretary of Nepal
- Website: opmcm.gov.np

The Office of the Prime Minister and Council of Ministers is a political and bureaucratic office that assists the Council of Ministers of Nepal and the Prime Minister of Nepal in the leadership of the Council of Ministers and Government. The incumbent Prime Minister is Balendra Shah and the current council of ministers is the Shah cabinet.

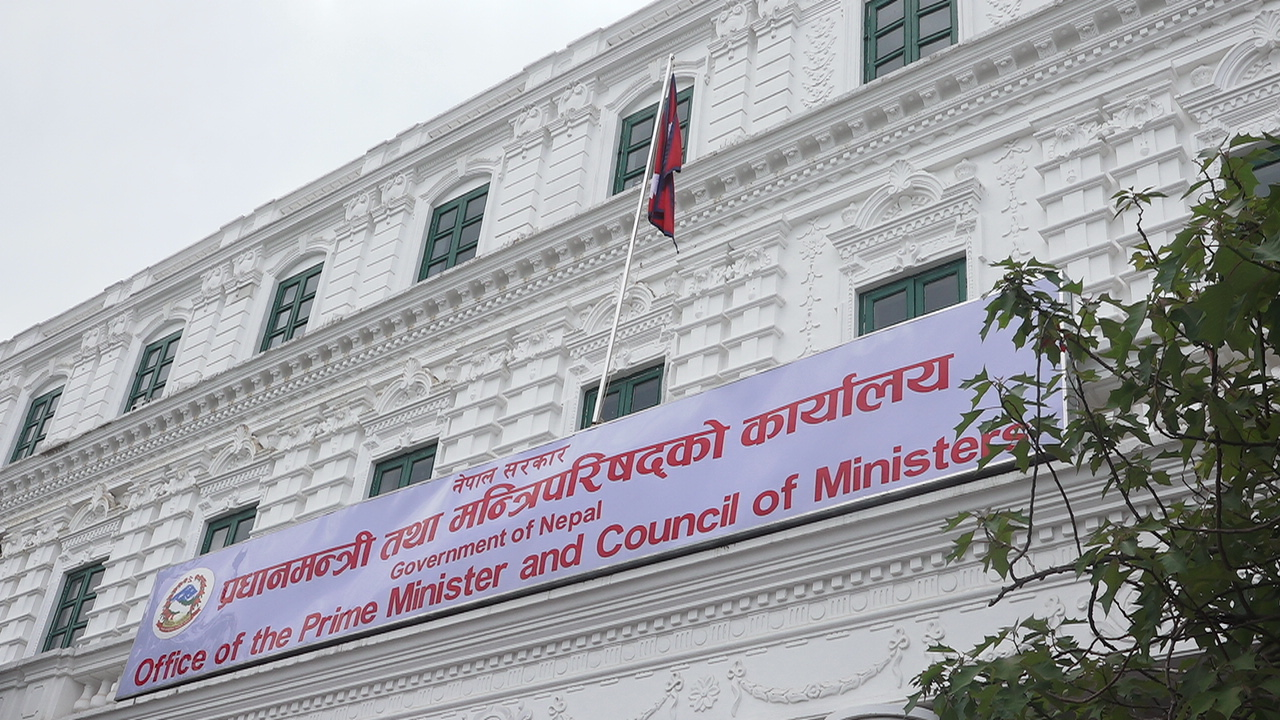
The Prime Minister's Office is located within Singha Durbar in Kathmandu

== Mandate ==
The Office's mandate includes the formation, dissolution and alteration of organizational structure of the ministries, the formulation, approval or issue of Bills, Ordinances, and Rules, observation, control, inspection, supervision, coordination, monitoring and evaluation of various ministries and Order and the Protection and Promotion of Human Rights.

== Organisational structure ==
The Office of the Prime Minister and Council of Ministers also oversees several departments, offices and commissions:

- Investment Board Nepal
- New Nepal Construction Fund
- Prime Minister's Disaster Relief Fund
- Commission for the Investigation of Abuse of Authority
- Public Service Commission
- National Human Right Commission
- National Planning Commission of Nepal
- National Vigilance Centre
- Public Procurement Monitoring Office
- Office of Nepal Trust
- Poverty Alleviation Fund
- Office of the President and Vice President
- Department of Revenue Investigation
- National Statistics Office
