= Rastriya Janashakti Party =

Rastriya Janashakti Party राष्ट्रिय जनशक्ति पार्टी
- President: Surya Bahadur Thapa
- Secretary: Keshar Bahadur Bista
- Founded: 2005
- Dissolved: July 25, 2007
- Split from: Rastriya Prajatantra Party
- Merged into: Rastriya Prajatantra Party
- Headquarters: Kathmandu
- Student wing: Rastriya Janashakti Student Union
- Women's wing: Rastriya Janashakti Mahila Sangh
- Ideology: Liberalism
- Political position: Centre-right

Election symbol

Rastriya Janashakti Party was a liberal political party in Nepal, led by former Prime Minister Surya Bahadur Thapa. Thapa had split away from the Rastriya Prajatantra Party in November 2004. The party was registered with the Election Commission of Nepal in March 2005. The party merged into Rastriya Prajatantra Party on July 25, 2007.

== Leadership ==
The party is led by a Central Working Committee. Thapa is the chairman of the party. Prakash Chandra Lohani is the vice chairman of the party.

== Split from RPP ==
RJP emerged from a split in the Rastriya Prajatantra Party, as Thapa left the RPP, which he helped found in 1990, on November 4, 2004. On November 19, 2004, Thapa and his followers opened a 'contact office' in Balutwar, Kathmandu, to organise a broad political conference and coordinate the construction of a new party. On December 27, 2004 the group formed a 320-member organising committee for the holding of the conference of the new party. Thapa was chairman of the committee, Lohani vice chairman and Buddhiman Tamang secretary. Other prominent members of the committee were Kamal Thapa, Hari Bahadur Basnet, Sarvendra Nath Sukla and Renu Kumari Yadav.

Kamal Thapa left the committee in January 2005.

== Foundation ==
The RJP was founded on March 13, 2005. The 'broad political conference' was, however, postponed due to the imposition of Emergency rule by King Gyanendra on February 1, 2005.

== 2005-2006 coup and revolt ==
RJP had expressed differences with King Gyanendra after the February 1, 2005 coup, over issues like political appointments in the local administrations. RJP accused the King of eliminating the forces working for constitutional monarchy, through his political actions. At the time, RJP tried to profile itself as a centrist party, in between positions advocating direct monarchical rule and republic.

RJP boycotted the 2006 municipal election.

During the Loktantra Andolan, the RJP suggested that the King Gyanendra would initiate talks with 'constitutional forces'.

When the King was stripped of his political powers by the interim parliament, RJP did not object.

== Merger ==
In November 2006, the Prajatantrik Nepal Party led by Keshar Bahadur Bista merged into RJP. Bista became general secretary of RJP.

== 2008 election ==
Ahead of the Constituent Assembly election, RJP had proposed having a mixed election system, with 75 district representatives and 230 members elected through proportional representation. The party also proposed constituting an 'Ethnic Assembly' as the upper house of parliament.

In April 2007, the party dropped the term 'constitutional monarchy' from its party statue.

On February 15, 2008, RJP formed the Samyukta Samabeshi Morcha, a front of 'monarchist and democratic forces', along with Nepali Rastriya Janabhavana Party, Rastriya Janamukti Party and Rastriya Jana Ekta Party. The front favours ceremonial monarchy.

On February 19, 2008, RJP had called for an election boycott, claiming that the situation in Madhes made elections impossible to hold. After an agreement was reached between United Democratic Madhesi Front and the Government of Nepal on February 27, 2008, and the UDMF parties pledge to contest the CA polls, the RJP declared that it would participate as well.

On March 6, 2008, Thapa declared that his party was not monarchist, but would accept the verdict of the voters. RJP MPs had previously boycotted a vote in the interim parliament on making Nepal a republic. Thapa had dubbed the vote 'an attack on the fundamental norms of democracy'.

At the elections to the 1st Nepalese Constituent Assembly, the RJP received 79,925 votes (0.77%) in the constituency vote, winning no seats. With 102,147 votes (0.95%) in the party list vote the RJP won three seats to the Assembly.

Just before, Constituent Assembly election, 2013 Rastriya Janashakti Party merged with Rastriya Prajatantra Party.
