= Fourth Surya Bahadur Thapa cabinet =

Government of Nepal from 1997 to 1998

- Cabinet of Nepal
- October 1997–April 1998
- Date formed: 7 October 1997
- Date dissolved: 12 April 1998

People and organisations
- Monarch: King Birendra
- Prime Minister: Surya Bahadur Thapa
- Total no. of members: 47 appointments
- Member parties: Nepali Congress Rastriya Prajatantra Party Nepal Sadbhawana Party
- Status in legislature: Majority (coalition)
- Opposition party: CPN (UML)
- Opposition leaders: Man Mohan Adhikari

History
- Election: 1994
- Legislature terms: 1994–1999
- Predecessor: Chand–Gautam coalition
- Successor: Second G.P. Koirala cabinet

The fourth Surya Bahadur Thapa cabinet was formed on 7 October 1997. Surya Bahadur Thapa of the Rastriya Prajatantra Party was appointed as the prime minister by King Birendra after he was supported by Nepali Congress, Nepal Sadbhawana Party and some independents. The cabinet was expanded on 27 October 1997 and was reshuffled on 3 December 1997.

After losing a no-confidence motion, his government was disbanded on 12 April 1998 after the appointment of Girija Prasad Koirala as prime minister.

== Cabinet ==
=== October–December 1997 ===
Portfolio	Minister	Party	Took office	Left office
Prime Minister of Nepal; Minister for Palace Affairs	Surya Bahadur Thapa	Rastriya Prajatantra Party	7 October 1997	12 April 1998
Minister for Construction and Transportation	Balaram Gharti Magar	Rastriya Prajatantra Party	27 October 1997	3 December 1997
Minister for Industry	Fateh Singh Tharu	Rastriya Prajatantra Party	27 October 1997	3 December 1997
Minister for Finance	Rabindra Nath Sharma	Rastriya Prajatantra Party	7 October 1997	12 April 1998
Minister for Water Supply	Pashupati S.J.B. Rana	Rastriya Prajatantra Party	7 October 1997	12 April 1998
Minister for Housing and Physical Planning; Minister for Land Reform and Management; Minister for Commerce; Minister for Science and Technology	Prakash Chandra Lohani	Rastriya Prajatantra Party	7 October 1997	3 December 1997
Minister for Foreign Affairs	Kamal Thapa	Rastriya Prajatantra Party	7 October 1997	12 April 1998
Minister for Agriculture	Kamal Thapa	Rastriya Prajatantra Party	7 October 1997	3 December 1997
Minister for Local Development	Gajendra Narayan Singh	Nepal Sadbhawana Party	7 October 1997	12 April 1998
Minister for Forests and Soil Conservation	Gajendra Narayan Singh	Nepal Sadbhawana Party	7 October 1997	27 October 1997
Minister for Home Affairs	Budhhiman Tamang	Rastriya Prajatantra Party	27 October 1997	3 December 1997
Minister without portfolio	Ram Krishna Acharya	Rastriya Prajatantra Party	27 October 1997	12 April 1998
Minister for Youth, Sports and Culture	Sharat Singh Bhandari	Nepali Congress	27 October 1997	12 April 1998
Minister for Supplies	Moti Prasad Pahadi	Nepali Congress	27 October 1997	12 April 1998
Minister for Information and Communications	Sarbendra Nath Shukla	Rastriya Prajatantra Party	27 October 1997	3 December 1997
Minister without portfolio	Rajiv Parajuli	Rastriya Prajatantra Party	27 October 1997	3 December 1997
Minister without portfolio	Ram Vilas Yadav	Rastriya Prajatantra Party	27 October 1997	3 December 1997
Minister for Health	Shanti Shamsher Rana	Rastriya Prajatantra Party	27 October 1997	3 December 1997
Minister without portfolio	Mahendra Raya	Rastriya Prajatantra Party	27 October 1997	12 April 1998
Minister for Forests and Soil Conservation	Hridayesh Tripathi	Nepal Sadbhawana Party	27 October 1997	12 April 1998
Ministers of State
Minister of State for Population and Environment	Palten Gurung	Nepali Congress	27 October 1997	3 December 1997
Minister of State for Home Affairs	Bishnu Bikram Thapa	Rastriya Prajatantra Party	27 October 1997	3 December 1997
Minister of State for Forests and Soil Conservation	Bhakta Bahadur Rokaya	Nepali Congress	27 October 1997	3 December 1997
Minister of State for Commerce	Mirza Dilshad Beg	Rastriya Prajatantra Party	27 October 1997	3 December 1997
Minister of State for Youth, Sports and Culture	Naresh Bahadur Singh	Nepali Congress	27 October 1997	12 April 1998

=== December 1997–April 1998 ===
Portfolio	Minister	Party	Took office	Left office
Prime Minister of Nepal; Minister for Palace Affairs	Surya Bahadur Thapa	Rastriya Prajatantra Party	7 October 1997	12 April 1998
Minister for Home Affairs	Khum Bahadur Khadka	Nepali Congress	3 December 1997	12 April 1998
Minister for Finance	Rabindra Nath Sharma	Rastriya Prajatantra Party	7 October 1997	12 April 1998
Minister for Housing and Physical Planning	Balaram Gharti Magar	Rastriya Prajatantra Party	3 December 1997	12 April 1998
Minister for Water Supply	Pashupati S.J.B. Rana	Rastriya Prajatantra Party	7 October 1997	12 April 1998
Minister for Agriculture	Prakash Chandra Lohani	Rastriya Prajatantra Party	3 December 1997	12 April 1998
Minister for Construction and Transportation	Bijay Kumar Gachhadar	Nepali Congress	3 December 1997	12 April 1998
Minister for Defence	Fateh Singh Tharu	Rastriya Prajatantra Party	3 December 1997	12 April 1998
Minister for Foreign Affairs	Kamal Thapa	Rastriya Prajatantra Party	7 October 1997	12 April 1998
Minister for Local Development	Gajendra Narayan Singh	Nepal Sadbhawana Party	7 October 1997	12 April 1998
Minister for Land Reform and Management	Budhhiman Tamang	Rastriya Prajatantra Party	3 December 1997	12 April 1998
Minister for Population and Environment	Prakash Man Singh	Nepali Congress	3 December 1997	12 April 1998
Minister without portfolio	Ram Krishna Acharya	Rastriya Prajatantra Party	27 October 1997	12 April 1998
Minister for Youth, Sports and Culture	Sharat Singh Bhandari	Nepali Congress	27 October 1997	12 April 1998
Minister for Supplies	Moti Prasad Pahadi	Nepali Congress	27 October 1997	12 April 1998
Minister for the Office of the Prime Minister	Sarbendra Nath Shukla	Rastriya Prajatantra Party	3 December 1997	12 April 1998
Minister without portfolio	Prem Bahadur Bhandari	Rastriya Prajatantra Party	3 December 1997	12 April 1998
Minister for Science and Technology	Rajiv Parajuli	Rastriya Prajatantra Party	3 December 1997	12 April 1998
Minister for Commerce	Ram Vilas Yadav	Rastriya Prajatantra Party	3 December 1997	12 April 1998
Minister without portfolio	Shanti Shamsher Rana	Rastriya Prajatantra Party	3 December 1997	12 April 1998
Minister without portfolio	Mahendra Raya	Rastriya Prajatantra Party	27 October 1997	12 April 1998
Minister for Forests and Soil Conservation	Hridayesh Tripathi	Nepal Sadbhawana Party	27 October 1997	12 April 1998
Minister for Information and Communications	Mahantha Thakur	Nepali Congress	3 December 1997	12 April 1998
Minister for Law and Justice	Siddha Raj Ojha	Nepali Congress	3 December 1997	12 April 1998
Minister for Labour	Palten Gurung	Nepali Congress	3 December 1997	12 April 1998
Minister for Education	Kul Bahadur Gurung	Nepali Congress	3 December 1997	12 April 1998
Minister for Health	Bipin Koirala	Nepali Congress	3 December 1997	12 April 1998
Ministers of State
Minister of State for Industry	Padma Narayan Chaudhary	Nepali Congress	3 December 1997	12 April 1998
Minister of State for General Administration	Shiva Raj Subedi	Nepali Congress	3 December 1997	12 April 1998
Minister of State for Women and Social Welfare	Meena Pandey	Nepali Congress	3 December 1997	12 April 1998
Minister of State for Parliamentary Affairs	Mani Lama	Nepali Congress	3 December 1997	12 April 1998
Minister of State for Agriculture	Bishnu Bikram Thapa	Rastriya Prajatantra Party	3 December 1997	12 April 1998
Minister of State for Forests and Soil Conservation	Bhakta Bahadur Rokaya	Nepali Congress	3 December 1997	12 April 1998
Minister of State for Housing and Physical Planning	Mirza Dilshad Beg	Rastriya Prajatantra Party	3 December 1997	12 April 1998
Minister of State for Youth, Sports and Culture	Naresh Bahadur Singh	Nepali Congress	27 October 1997	12 April 1998
Minister for Education	Rajendra Bahadur Shah	Nepali Congress	3 December 1997	12 April 1998
Minister of State for Home Affairs	Mahendra Yadav	Rastriya Prajatantra Party	3 December 1997	12 April 1998
Minister for Construction and Transportation	Kamlesh Sharma	Nepali Congress	3 December 1997	12 April 1998
Minister for Supplies	Ram Bahadur Gurung	Nepali Congress	3 December 1997	12 April 1998
Minister for Health	Bajra Kishor Singh	Nepali Congress	3 December 1997	12 April 1998
Minister for Information and Communications	Jay Prakash Gupta	Nepali Congress	3 December 1997	12 April 1998
Assistant Minister				
Assistant Minister for General Administration	Ram Janam Chaudhary	Nepali Congress	3 December 1997	12 April 1998
Assistant Minister for Industry	Surendra Hamal	Nepali Congress	3 December 1997	12 April 1998
Assistant Minister for Labour	Mohammad Aftab Alam	Nepali Congress	3 December 1997	12 April 1998
Assistant Minister for Tourism and Civil Aviation	Sushil Man Sherchan	Nepali Congress	3 December 1997	12 April 1998
Assistant Minister for Women and Social Welfare	Keshav Bahadur Chand	Nepali Congress	3 December 1997	12 April 1998
