= Chitwan 3 =

Parliamentary constituency in Nepal

- Parliamentary constituency
- Chitwan 3 in Bagmati Province
- Province: Bagmati Province
- District: Chitwan District
- Electorate: 155,309

Current constituency
- Created: 1991
- Seats: 1
- Party: RSP
- Member of Parliament: Sobita Gautam
- Member of the Provincial Assembly 3(A): Gir Bahadur Tamang, RPP
- Member of the Provincial Assembly 3(B): Thakur Prasad Dhakal , NCP

Chitwan 3 is one of three parliamentary constituencies of Chitwan District in Nepal. This constituency came into existence on the Constituency Delimitation Commission (CDC) report submitted on 31 August 2017.

== Incorporated areas ==
Chitwan 3 parliamentary constituency incorporates Madi Municipality and wards 6–9, and 13–28 of Bharatpur Metropolitan City.

== Assembly segments ==
It encompasses the following Bagmati Provincial Assembly segment

- Chitwan 3(A)
- Chitwan 3(B)

== Members of Parliament ==
=== Parliament/Constituent Assembly ===
| Election | Member | Party |
|---|---|---|
| 1991 | Amik Sherchan | Samyukta Janamorcha Nepal |
| 1999 | Dr. Gangadhar Lamsal | Nepali Congress |
| 2008 | Narayan Prasad Dahal | CPN (Maoist) |
| January 2009 | Narayan Prasad Dahal | UCPN (Maoist) |
| 2013 | Krishna Bhakta Pokharel | CPN (Unified Marxist–Leninist) |
| 2017 | Pushpa Kamal Dahal | CPN (Maoist Centre) |
| May 2018 | Pushpa Kamal Dahal | Nepal Communist Party |
| March 2021 | Pushpa Kamal Dahal | CPN (Maoist Centre) |
| 2022 | Bikram Pandey | Rastriya Prajatantra Party |
| 2026 | Sobita Gautam | Rastriya Swatantra Party |

=== Provincial Assembly ===
==== 3(A) ====
| Election | Member | Party |
|---|---|---|
| 2017 | Krishna Prasad Bhurtel | CPN (Unified Marxist–Leninist) |
| May 2018 | Krishna Prasad Bhurtel | Nepal Communist Party |

==== 3(B) ====
| Election | Member | Party |
|---|---|---|
| 2017 | Ram Lal Mahato | CPN (Maoist Centre) |
| May 2018 | Ram Lal Mahato | Nepal Communist Party |

== Election results ==
=== Election in the 2020s ===
==== 2026 general election ====
| Candidate | Party | Votes | % |
|---|---|---|---|
| Sobita Gautam | Rastriya Swatantra Party | 59,277 | 61.33 |
| Renu Dahal | Nepal Communist Party | 20,615 | 21.33 |
| Tek Prasad Gurung | Nepali Congress | 8,344 | 8.63 |
| Shankar Raj Thapaliya | CPN (Unified Marxist–Leninist) | 5,004 | 5.18 |
| Deepak Thapa (Magar) | Rastriya Prajatantra Party | 1,226 | 1.27 |
| Tojman Gurung | Shram Sanskriti Party | 650 | 0.67 |
| Dambar Bahadur Tamang | Ujyaalo Nepal Party | 414 | 0.43 |
| Others | | 1,128 | 1.17 |
| Total | | 96,658 | 100.00 |
| Valid votes | | 96,658 | 96.63 |
| Invalid/blank votes | | 3,375 | 3.37 |
| Total votes | | 100,033 | 100.00 |
| Registered voters/turnout | | 155,309 | 64.41 |
| Majority | | 38,662 | |
| Rastriya Swatantra Party gain | | | |

==== 2022 general election ====
| Candidate | Party | Votes | % |
|---|---|---|---|
| Bikram Pandey | Rastriya Prajatantra Party | 35,060 | 39.16 |
| Bhoj Raj Adhikari | CPN (Maoist Centre) | 25,824 | 28.84 |
| Jita Baral | Rastriya Swatantra Party | 14,843 | 16.58 |
| Dinesh Koirala | Independent | 12,275 | 13.71 |
| Others | | 1,527 | 1.71 |
| Total | | 89,529 | 100.00 |
| Majority | | 9,236 | |
| Rastriya Prajatantra Party gain | | | |

=== Election in the 2010s ===
==== 2017 legislative elections ====
| Party | Candidate | Votes |
|---|---|---|
| CPN (Maoist Centre) | Pushpa Kamal Dahal | 48,276 |
| Rastriya Prajatantra Party (Democratic) | Bikram Pandey | 38,935 |
| CPN (Marxist–Leninist) | Dambar Shrestha | 1,587 |
| Others | | 1,495 |
| Invalid votes | | 3,520 |
| Result | Maoist Centre gain | |
Source: Election Commission

==== 2017 Nepalese provincial elections ====
===== Chitwan 3(A) =====
| Party | Candidate | Votes |
|---|---|---|
| CPN (Unified Marxist–Leninist) | Krishna Prasad Bhurtel | 24,785 |
| Nepali Congress | Dinesh Koirala | 23,045 |
| Others | | 1,244 |
| Invalid votes | | 1,177 |
| Result | CPN (UML) gain | |
Source: Election Commission

===== Chitwan 3(B) =====
| Party | Candidate | Votes |
|---|---|---|
| CPN (Maoist Centre) | Ram Lal Mahato | 25,061 |
| Nepali Congress | Sajan Kumar Mahato | 15,945 |
| Others | | 1,512 |
| Invalid votes | | 1,006 |
| Result | Maoist Centre gain | |
Source: Election Commission

==== 2013 Constituent Assembly election ====
| Party | Candidate | Votes |
|---|---|---|
| CPN (Unified Marxist–Leninist) | Krishna Bhakta Pokharel | 15,661 |
| Nepali Congress | Bhim Bahadur Shrestha | 13,244 |
| UCPN (Maoist) | Narayan Prasad Dahal | 9,085 |
| Others | | 2,659 |
| Result | CPN (UML) gain | |
Source: NepalNews

=== Election in the 2000s ===
==== 2008 Constituent Assembly election ====
| Party | Candidate | Votes |
|---|---|---|
| CPN (Maoist) | Narayan Prasad Dahal | 17,804 |
| Nepali Congress | Maiya Devi Shrestha | 11,802 |
| CPN (Unified Marxist–Leninist) | Devi Prasad Gyawali | 8,690 |
| CPN (Marxist–Leninist) | Khem Nath Regmi | 1,901 |
| Others | | 1,650 |
| Invalid votes | | 1,476 |
| Result | Maoist gain | |
Source: Election Commission

=== Election in the 1990s ===
==== 1999 legislative elections ====
| Party | Candidate | Votes |
|---|---|---|
| Nepali Congress | Dr. Gangadhar Lamsal | 23,265 |
| CPN (Unified Marxist–Leninist) | Nar Bahadur Khand | 14,499 |
| CPN (Marxist–Leninist) | Shailendra Kumar Piya | 5,167 |
| Others | | 2,448 |
| Invalid Votes | | 1,114 |
| Result | Congress hold | |
Source: Election Commission

==== 1994 legislative elections ====
| Party | Candidate | Votes |
|---|---|---|
| Nepali Congress | Dr. Gangadhar Lamsal | 20,327 |
| CPN (Unified Marxist–Leninist) | Shailendra Kumar Piya | 15,177 |
| Rastriya Prajatantra Party | Krishna Kumar Adhikari | 2,205 |
| Others | | 1,016 |
| Result | Congress gain | |
Source: Election Commission

==== 1991 legislative elections ====
| Party | Candidate | Votes |
|---|---|---|
| Samyukta Janamorcha Nepal | Amik Sherchan | 22,895 |
| Nepali Congress | Prithvi Man Gurung | 17,805 |
| Result | SJMN gain | |

== See also ==
- List of parliamentary constituencies of Nepal
