= Rajendra Prasad Lingden =

Nepalese politician

Shree Rajendra Prasad Lingden
- राजेन्द्रप्रसाद लिङ्देन
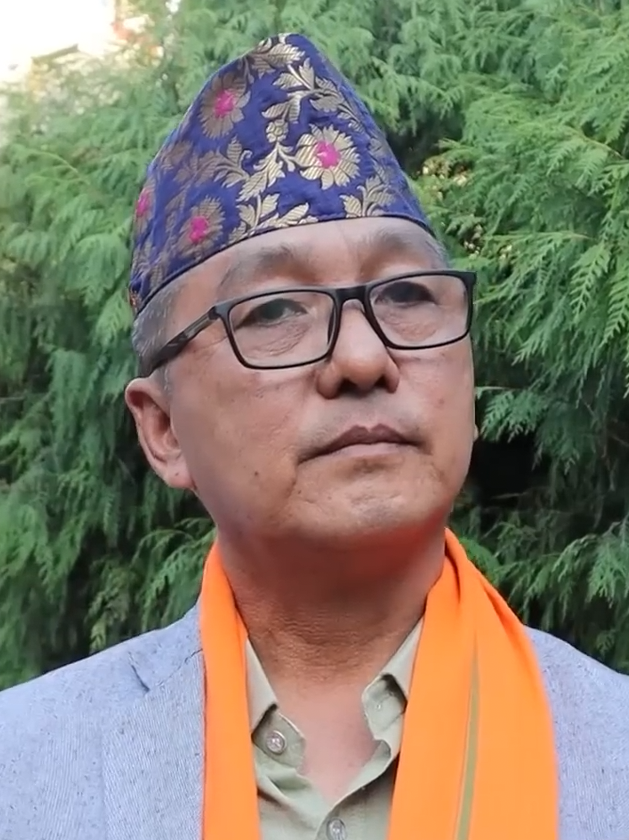
- Lingden in 2022

Deputy Prime Minister of Nepal
- In office 17 January 2023 – 25 February 2023 Serving with Bishnu Prasad Paudel, Narayan Kaji Shrestha and Rabi Lamichhane
- President: Bidya Devi Bhandari
- Prime Minister: Pushpa Kamal Dahal
- Preceded by: Bishnu Prasad Paudel; Rajendra Mahato; Raghubir Mahaseth
- Succeeded by: Purna Bahadur Khadka

Minister of Energy, Water Resources and Irrigation of Nepal
- In office 17 January 2023 – 25 February 2023
- President: Bidya Devi Bhandari
- Prime Minister: Pushpa Kamal Dahal
- Preceded by: Pampha Bhusal
- Succeeded by: Shakti Bahadur Basnet

Chairman of Rastriya Prajatantra Party
- Incumbent
- Assumed office 5 December 2021
- Senior Deputy Chairman: Rabindra Mishra (from 28 September 2022)
- Deputy Chairman: Bikram Pandey; Budhhiman Tamang; Dhruba Bahadur Pradhan; Rosan Karki
- Preceded by: Kamal Thapa; Pashupati Shamsher JBR; Prakash Chandra Lohani

Member of Parliament, Pratinidhi Sabha
- In office 4 March 2018 – 12 September 2025
- Preceded by: Krishna Prasad Sitaula
- Succeeded by: Prakash Pathak
- Constituency: Jhapa 3

Personal details
- Born: 7 September 1965 (age 61) Panchthar District, Nepal
- Party: Rastriya Prajatantra Party
- Other political affiliations: Rastriya Prajatantra Party Nepal
- Spouse: Sita Thapa
- Parent(s): Man Prasad Lingden (father); Dhan Kumari Lingden (mother)

Rajendra Prasad Lingden (Nepali: राजेन्द्रप्रसाद लिङ्देन) is a Nepali politician and former Deputy Prime Minister of Nepal. He also served as the Minister of Energy, Water Resources and Irrigation. He is also the chairman of the Rastriya Prajatantra Party (RPP). He served as a member of the 1st Federal Parliament of Nepal from March 2018. He was re-elected in 2022 in the 2nd Federal Parliament of Nepal.

== Early life and education ==
Rajendra Lingden was born in Amarpur, in Panchthar district, to Dhan Kumari and Man Prasad Lingden. He married Sita Thapa, they have one daughter and two sons. Lingden was involved in politics from a young age. He has completed his master's degree from Tribhuvan University. He was also nominated for the position of chairman of the District Development Committee of Jhapa during the direct rule of King Gyanendra. He comes from Jhapa-3, constituency.

== Career ==
Lingden was involved in RPP politics from the beginning of the party's establishment. He held several positions within the party, including General Secretary, before contesting for the position of president in 2021.

On 5 December 2021, Lingden was elected Chairman of the Rastriya Prajatantra Party by defeating the incumbent chairman, Kamal Thapa at the party's general convention. Lingden got 1,844 votes, while Kamal Thapa got 1,617 votes. A total of 413 votes were invalidated. Stating that he would accept defeat, Thapa tweeted and congratulated Lingden on his victory.

In the 2017 and 2022 elections, Lingden defeated former Home Minister Krishna Prasad Sitaula. Sitaula was considered Girija Prasad Koirala's right-hand person in bringing Maoists, UML, and other parties together, and his defeat was seen as a rebuke of the Nepali Congress's handling of the aftermath of the peace process.

After the Rastriya Prajatantra Party's strong showing in the 2022 Nepalese general election, where the party won 14 seats, the RPP decided to join the current coalition government under Lingden's leadership. Lingden became Deputy Prime Minister and Minister of Energy, Water Resources and Irrigation. On 25 February 2023, Lingden resigned from his posts, and the RPP quit the coalition government being in for less than 40 days.

== Electoral history ==
Lingden lost from Jhapa 3 in the 2013 Constituent Assembly election.

Party	Candidate	Votes
Nepali Congress	Krishna Prasad Sitaula	14,355
Rastriya Prajatantra Party Nepal	Rajendra Prasad Lingden	9,253
CPN (Unified Marxist–Leninist)	Basanta Kumar Baniya	6,462
UCPN (Maoist)	Dharma Shila Chapagain	6,217
Madheshi Janaadhikar Forum, Nepal (Democratic)	Bharatendu Kumar Mallik	3,798
Federal Socialist Party, Nepal	Bijay Kumar Gurung	1,358
Others		2,291
Result	Congress gain	
Source: NepalNews

In the 2017 Nepalese general election, he was elected from the Jhapa 3 constituency, securing 44614 (56.52%) votes.

Party	Candidate	Votes
Rastriya Prajatantra Party	Rajendra Prasad Lingden	44,614
Nepali Congress	Krishna Prasad Sitaula	31,171
CPN (Marxist–Leninist)	Navaraj Kharel	1,306
Others		1,841
Invalid votes		4,312
Result	RPP gain	
Source: Election Commission

In the 2022 Nepalese general election, he was elected from the Jhapa 3 constituency, securing 40,662 (47.94%) votes.

Party	Candidate	Votes
Rastriya Prajatantra Party	Rajendra Prasad Lingden	40,662
Nepali Congress	Krishna Prasad Sitaula	37,386
CPN (Marxist–Leninist)	Navaraj Kharel	3,461
Others		1,384
Invalid votes		1,915
Result	RPP gain	
Source: Election Commission
