= Rastriya Prajatantra Party (Chand) =

Rastriya Prajatantra Party (Chand) राष्ट्रिय प्रजातन्त्र पार्टी (राष्ट्रवादी)
- President: Lokendra Bahadur Chand
- Founded: 1990 (first); 1997 (second)
- Dissolved: 1992 (first); 1998 (second)
- Split from: Rastriya Prajatantra Party
- Merged into: Rastriya Prajatantra Party
- Headquarters: Kathmandu
- Ideology: Liberalism; Constitutional monarchism
- Political position: Centre-right

Election symbol
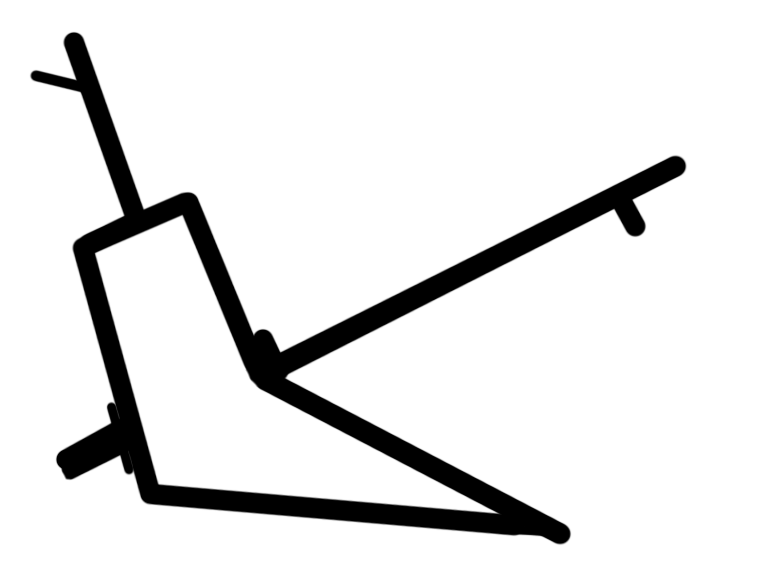

The Rashtriya Prajatantra Party-Chand (Nepali: राष्ट्रिय प्रजातन्त्र पार्टी-चन्द, lit. 'National Democratic Party-Chand') was a Nepalese political party. It was a right-wing pro-monarchy party, formed out of the political elite of the erstwhile Panchayat system.

The party was first founded in 1997 when a faction of the Rastriya Prajatantra Party led by Lokendra Bahadur Chand joined a coalition government with Communist Party of Nepal (Unified Marxist–Leninist), with Chand as Prime Minister. The faction led by Surya Bahadur Thapa allied itself with Nepali Congress and toppled the UML-RPP government. In 1998 the party was reunited, after both factions had fared badly in the elections that year.
