= 2021 general convention of Rastriya Prajatantra Party =

General convention of Rastriya Prajatantra Party also the unity convention of the party is scheduled for 1–3 December 2021 to elect central committee members and portfolios. A total 4,500 delegates took part in the convention with nine from each provincial constituency. It was held in Bhrikuti Mandap, Kathmandu of Nepal. Similarly, some special guest like Prime Minister Sher Bahadur Deuba from Nepali Congress, former prime minister Madhav Kumar Nepal from CPN (US) including other representative from parties within and outside Nepal who were present in the opening ceremony of the program.

== Participation ==
A total 4,500 delegates were elected who would vote in the convention. Among them, there is a provision of 2,970 elected delegates from 330 provincial assembly constituency while. Others shall come from sister organizations and some shall be nominated by president. The party elected nine representatives from each Province Assembly constituency based on inclusiveness according to which, three from Khas Arya, three from women, one from Janajati, one from Dalit, one from minority, Muslim, Tharu.

In short, 50,000 active members of the party throughout the country took part in these process.

== Elected portfolios ==
On 1 November 2021, it was announced that election shall take place by the help of EVM.

S.N	Name	Pannel	Votes	Result	Quota	Reference
President (1)						
1	Rajendra Prasad Lingden	Lingden	1844	Won	Open	
2	Kamal Thapa	Thapa	1617	Lost	Open	
Vice president (4)
1	Buddhiman Tamang	Thapa	1944	Won	Open(3)	
2	Dhruba Bahadur Pradhan	Thapa	1814	Won	Open(3)	
3	Bikram Pandey	Lingden	2521	Won	Open(3)	
4	Dil Bikash Raj Bhandari	Lingden	1194	Lost	Open(3)	
5	Ram Chandra Ray	Lingden	967	Lost	Open(3)	
6	Roshan Karki	Thapa	1589	Won	Women(1)	
7	Lila Shrestha	Lingden	1054	Lost	Women(1)	
General Secretary (3)
1	Dhawal Shamsher Rana	Lingden	2221	Won	Open(2)	
2	Shyam Timilsina	Lingden	1061	Lost	Open(2)	
3	Bhuwan Pathak	Thapa	1705	Won	Open(2)	
4	Bhaskar Bhadra	Thapa	1567	Lost	Open(2)	
5	Kunti Shahi	Thapa	2008	Won	Women(1)	
6	Rekha Thapa	Lingden	1640	Lost	Women(1)	
