= Bikram Pandey =

Nepali politician (born 1953)

Honourable Bikram Pandey
- विक्रम पाण्डे
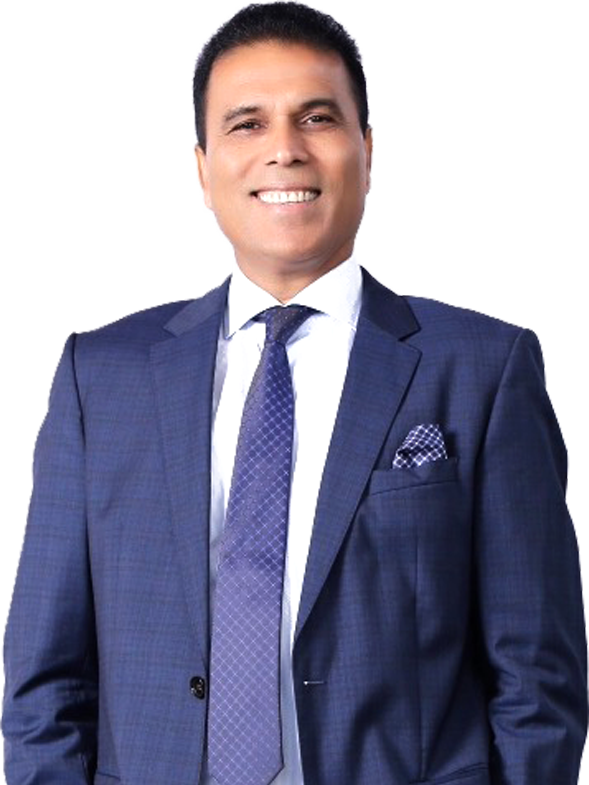
- Bikram Pandey

14th Minister of Urban Development
- In office 17 January 2023 – 25 February 2023
- President: Bidya Devi Bhandari
- Prime Minister: Pushpa Kamal Dahal
- Preceded by: Metmani Chaudhary
- Succeeded by: Sita Gurung

Minister for Forests and Soil Conservation
- In office 11 September 2017 – 15 February 2018
- Prime Minister: Sher Bahadur Deuba
- Preceded by: Sher Bahadur Deuba as Prime Minister of Nepal
- Succeeded by: Shakti Bahadur Basnet

Minister of Land Reform and Management
- In office 11 August 2016 – 8 May 2017
- President: Bidya Devi Bhandari
- Prime Minister: K. P. Sharma Oli
- Preceded by: Ram Kumar Subba
- Succeeded by: Gopal Dahit

Vice-president of Rastriya Prajatantra Party
- Incumbent
- Assumed office 5 December 2021
- President: Rajendra Lingden

Member of Parliament, Pratinidhi Sabha
- In office 22 December 2022 – 12 September 2025
- Preceded by: Pushpa Kamal Dahal
- Succeeded by: Sobita Gautam
- Constituency: Chitwan 3

Member of the Constituent Assembly
- In office 21 January 2014 – 14 October 2017
- Preceded by: Amik Sherchan
- Succeeded by: Constituency abolished
- Constituency: Chitwan 5

Personal details
- Born: 24 April 1953 (age 73) Chitwan District, Nepal
- Party: Rastriya Prajatantra Party
- Other political affiliations: RPP (D)
- Education: Tribhuvan University, Kathmandu, Nepal

Bikram Pandey is a Nepalese politician belonging to Rastriya Prajatantra Party and constituent assembly member. He was elected to the Pratinidhi Sabha in the 2013 CA election on behalf of the Rastriya Prajatantra Party from Chitwan 5.

Pandey is the current Vice president of Rastriya Prajatantra Party elected from the 2021 general convention of Rastriya Prajatantra Party.

== Political life ==
Pandey has served several terms as minister in different ministries. Pandey was one among the three RPP leaders to win FPTP election to Constituent Assembly after 2013.

In 2017 Nepalese General Election, Pandey was candidate from Chitwan 3 against former prime minister and Maoist leader Pushpa Kamal Dahal. He had challenged Dahal to win the constituency on his own while this was keenly watched throughout the country. Pandey, a candidate of RPP was supported by Nepali Congress. Though Pandey was unsuccessful, he lost with a very less margin than expected.

Pandey is the newly elected vice president of the Rastriya Prajatantra Party.

== Controversies ==
Pandey is the chairman of Kalika Group which operates construction and power companies, among others. In 2018, the Commission for the Investigation of Abuse of Authority filed Rs 2 billion corruption case against Pandey over the faulty construction of the Sikta Irrigation Canal. Pandey was later acquitted of all charges by the Special Court.

Pandey's appointment as Minister for Urban Development in 2023 has also been criticized as a conflict of interest since he owns a construction company that bids for government tenders and is now in charge of a ministry that hands out those same tenders.

== Electoral history ==
=== 2017 legislative elections ===
Chitwan 3 (constituency)
Party	Candidate	Votes
CPN (Maoist Centre)	Pushpa Kamal Dahal	48,276
Rastriya Prajatantra Party (Democratic)	Bikram Pandey	38,935
CPN (Marxist–Leninist)	Dambar Shrestha	1,587
Others		1,495
Invalid votes		3,520
Result	Maoist Centre gain	
Source: Election Commission
