= Hari Bahadur Basnet =

Nepalese politician

Personal details
- Party: Rastriya Prajatantra Party

Hari Bahadur Basnet is a Nepalese politician. He is the head of the Foreign Relations Department of the Rastriya Janashakti Party. Basnet holds a M.Sc. in Engineering.

Basnet entered politics in 1970. Three times he was elected to the Rastriya Panchayat. He joined the Rastriya Prajatantra Party when it was formed, and became a Central Committee member of the party. He also headed the International Relations department of RPP.

In 2003, he was appointed Minister of Law, Justice and Parliamentary Affairs, Education and Sports, Industry, Commerce, and Supplies in the cabinet of Surya Bahadur Thapa.
