= Dhawal Shamsher Rana =

Nepali politician

- धवल शम्शेर राणा

General Secretary of Rastriya Prajatantra Party
- In office 5 December 2021 – 4 June 2026 Serving with: Bhuwan Kumar Pathak; Kunti Shahi; Rajendra Gurung; Pralhad Prasad Sah; Sharad Raj Pathak
- President: Rajendra Prasad Lingden

Member of Parliament, Pratinidhi Sabha
- In office 22 December 2022 – 12 September 2025
- Preceded by: Mohammad Ishtiyaq Rayi
- Succeeded by: Mohammad Ishtiyaq Rayi
- Constituency: Banke 2

9th and 11th Mayor of Nepalgunj Sub-Metropolitan City
- In office 2017–2022
- Deputy: Uma Thapa Magar
- Preceded by: Ramesh Aryal
- Succeeded by: Prashant Bista
- In office 1997–2002
- Preceded by: Bijay Kumar Gupta
- Succeeded by: Ramesh Aryal

Personal details
- Born: 9 March 1962 (age 64) Banke, Nepal
- Party: Rastriya Prajatantra Party; Jay Nepal Party
- Parent(s): Kailash Samsher Rana (Father); Ambika Rana (Mother)
- Education: PHD

Dhawal Shamsher Rana (Nepali: धवल शम्शेर राणा) is a Nepalese politician, belonging to the Rastriya Prajatantra Party. Shumsher is the former mayor of Nepalgunj Sub-metropolitan City in Banke.

Rana is the formal general secretary of Rastriya Prajatantra Party elected from the 2021 general convention of Rastriya Prajatantra Party.
