= National Democratic Student Organization =

Youth organisation in Nepal

- President: Kaml Rajwar
- Founded: 1978
- Headquarters: Kathmandu
- Mother party: Rastriya Prajatantra Party

National Democratic Student Organization is a student organisation in Nepal. It is the student wing of the Constitutional monarchist Rastriya Prajatantra Party.
