= Pashupati Shumsher Jung Bahadur Rana =

Nepalese politician (born 1941)

Pashupati Shamsher Jung Bahadur Rana
- पशुपति शम्शेर जङ्ग बहादुर राणा
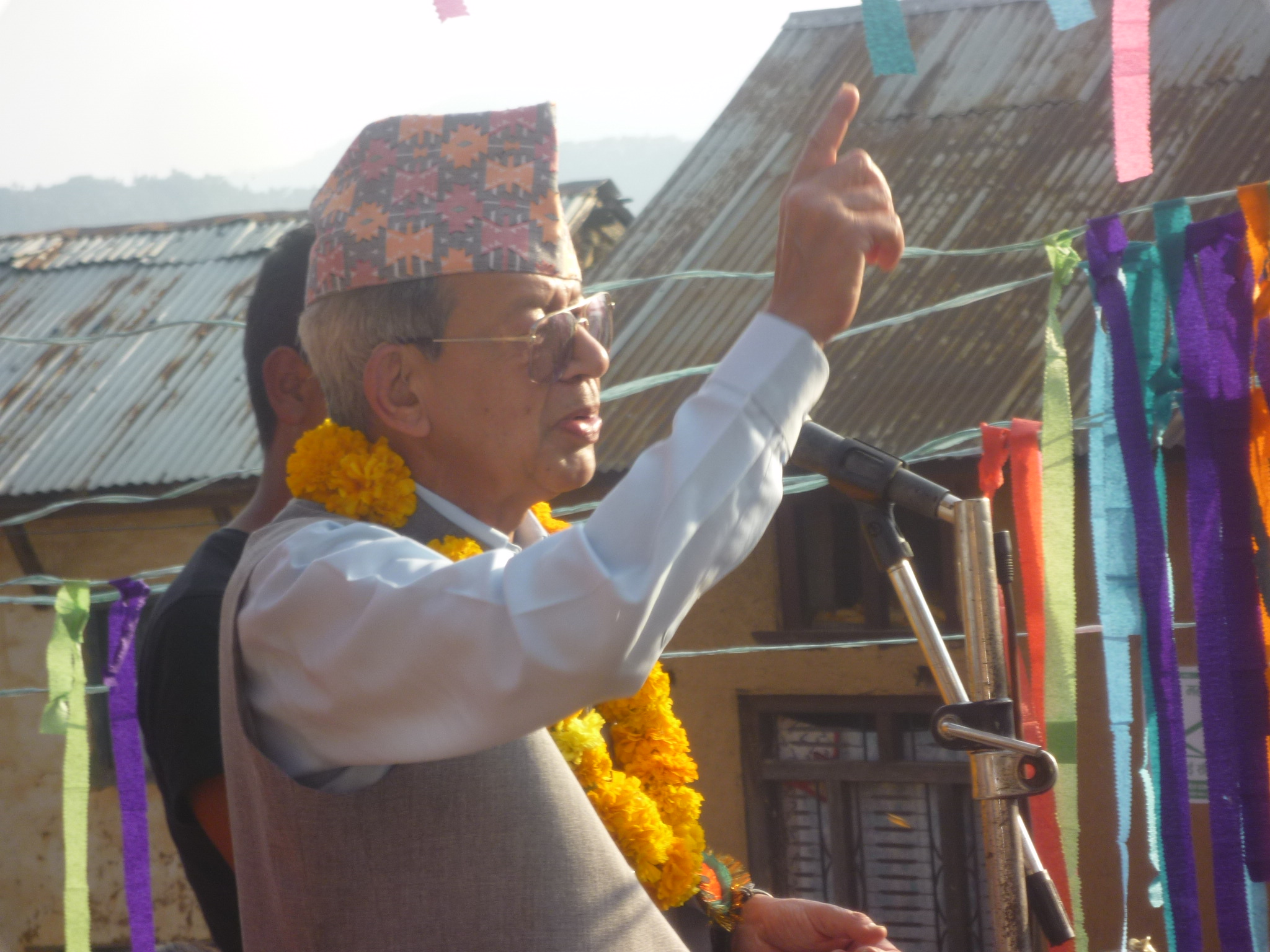
- Rana in 2013

Chairman of the Rastriya Prajatantra Party
- In office 2002–2021
- Monarch: Birendra of Nepal
- Prime Minister: Surya Bahadur Thapa
- Preceded by: Surya Bahadur Thapa
- Succeeded by: Rajendra Lingden

Deputy Prime Minister of Nepal
- In office 7 October 1997 – 15 April 1998

Interim Speaker of the Pratinidhi Sabha
- In office 22 December 2022-19 January 2023
- Preceded by: Agni Prasad Sapkota
- Succeeded by: Dev Raj Ghimire

Minister of Foreign Affairs
- In office 1990–1994
- Preceded by: Hari Bahadur Basnet
- Succeeded by: Krishna Prasad Bhattarai

Minister of Finance of Nepal
- In office 1990–1994
- Monarch: Birendra of Nepal
- Preceded by: Bharat Bahadur Thapa
- Succeeded by: Devendra Raj Pandey

Ministry of Water Resources and Communication
- In office 1990–1994
- Monarch: Birendra of Nepal

Member of Parliament, Pratinidhi Sabha
- In office 1978–2013
- Constituency: Sindhupalchowk-3

Member of Parliament, Rastriya Sabha
- In office 2022–2026

Minister of Panchayat and Local Development
- In office 1986–1988
- Monarch: Birendra of Nepal

Minister of Transport and Tourism
- In office 1978–1979
- Monarch: Birendra of Nepal

Minister of Home Affairs
- In office 1986–1988
- Monarch: Birendra of Nepal

Personal details
- Born: 7 May 1941 (age 85) Laxmi Nivas Palace, Maharajganj, Kathmandu, Kingdom of Nepal
- Party: Rastriya Prajatantra Party
- Spouse: Rani Usha Raje Scindia
- Children: Urvashi Rajya Lakshmi; Devyani Rajya Lakshmi
- Parent(s): General Shree Tin Yuvaraj Bijaya Shamsher Jang Bahadur Rana; Rani Sarala Kumari Rajya Lakshmi Rana
- Relatives: see Rana dynasty (house); Jiwajirao Scindia (father-in-law)
- Education: New College, Oxford University

10th Head of the Rana dynasty
- Reign: 6 January 1967 – present
- Predecessor: Mohan Shumsher Jung Bahadur Rana

Pashupati Shumsher Jung Bahadur Rana (Nepali: पशुपति शम्शेर जङ्ग बहादुर राणा) is a politician from the former Rana dynasty of Nepal. He served as the Minister of Foreign Affairs, the Minister of Finance, the Minister of Water Resources and Minister of Communications and the Deputy Prime Minister of Nepal after the Panchayat era. He served as Minister of Home Affairs, Minister of Panchayat and Local Development (1986–1988), Minister of Transport and Tourism (1978–1979) and various other full ministers and state ministers during the Panchayat era. He is also one of the richest people in Nepal.

== Personal life ==
Pashupati Shumsher Jang Bahadur Rana was born to Lieutenant General Yuvaraj Bijaya Shamsher Jang Bahadur Rana, son of H.H. Shree Tin Maharaja Mohan Shumsher Jang Bahadur Rana, into the Rana dynasty of Nepal, which had wielded hereditary power in the Kingdom of Nepal since 1846. Rana attended Bishop Cotton School in Shimla, India, for his early secondary education. He continued his studies at Haileybury and Imperial Service College in the United Kingdom, then pursued a PPE degree at New College, University of Oxford and graduated with a Bachelor of Arts degree.

He is married to Maharani Usha Raje Scindia, daughter of the Maharaja of the Gwalior State, Jiwaji Rao Scindia and Vijaya Raje Scindia. He has two daughters: Devyani Rajya Lakshmi and Urvashi Rajya Lakshmi. Devyani Rajya Lakshmi married the erstwhile Yuvaraj of Singrauli; Aishwarya Singh, son of Bhuvneshwar Prasad Singh and Veena Kumari Singh. Urvashi Rajya Lakshmi married Shiv Khemka, a businessman from the "Marwadi" Community.

=== Wealth ===
Rana's wealth derives primarily from inherited Rana family estates and lands, such as the Lakshmi Niwas palace, dating to the pre-1951 era, which were subsequently managed through business ventures in manufacturing and energy sectors. He holds stakes in various Nepalese manufacturing companies, banks and previously owned Nepal Gas, contributing to an estimated net worth of $820 million as of recent assessments. His marriage to Usha Raje Scindia has also contributed and bolstered his economic standing. He is regarded as one of Nepal's cleanest politicians, contrary to other mainstream politicians.

== Political career ==
=== Ministerial positions ===
Pashupati Shumsher Jung Bahadur Rana assumed the role of Minister of Foreign Affairs shortly after the 1990 restoration of multiparty democracy, which marked the end of the Panchayat autocratic system and initiated a transitional phase in Nepal's governance. During this period, his diplomatic efforts emphasized maintaining Nepal's non-aligned stance amid pressures from neighboring India and China, as well as emerging engagements with Western powers, thereby preserving national autonomy in foreign policy formulation. This approach aligned with historical precedents of Nepalese leaders who prioritized sovereignty through pragmatic balancing of great-power interests, avoiding over-reliance on any single external actor. Rana subsequently served as Minister of Finance in the immediate post-1990 democratic interim government, focusing on stabilizing public finances during economic uncertainty following political upheaval. His brief tenure addressed foundational fiscal management in a nascent multiparty framework, though quantifiable outcomes such as debt reduction or revenue enhancements are sparsely documented in contemporary accounts.

In the mid-1990s, Rana held the position of Minister of Water Resources, where he advanced infrastructure initiatives centered on hydropower and irrigation to capitalize on Nepal's hydrological assets. A key action was tabling the Mahakali Integrated Development Treaty in parliament in 1997 for ratification, which outlined joint utilization of the Mahakali River for power generation and agriculture with India, potentially enabling multi-gigawatt hydropower capacity while raising concerns over equitable resource control and long-term sovereignty implications. His advocacy for such projects underscored the causal linkage between untapped water resources and economic self-sufficiency, positioning hydropower as a cornerstone for reducing Nepal's energy deficits without compromising territorial integrity.

=== Rashtriya Prajatantra Party ===
Pashupati Shumsher Jung Bahadur Rana positioned himself as a proponent of ideological consistency within the Rastriya Prajatantra Party (RPP), emphasizing the reinstatement of a Hindu state and constitutional monarchy as foundational tenets amid perceived dilutions in the unified party's post-2016 merger direction.

On August 6, 2017, Rana led a factional split from the RPP, registering the Rastriya Prajatantra Party (Democratic)—also known as RPP-Prajatantrik—at the Election Commission, citing irreconcilable differences with Chairman Kamal Thapa over pragmatic alliances like joining Prime Minister Sher Bahadur Deuba coalition government, which Rana argued undermined commitments to monarchist and Hindu nationalist principles.

The departure reduced the original RPP's parliamentary strength from 37 seats, highlighting fractures in sustaining unity after the November 2016 merger of Thapa's RPP-Nepal and Rana's earlier RPP faction.

Subsequent leadership tensions in 2018 involved merger negotiations with Thapa's RPP and Prakash Chandra Lohani's group, where Rana advocated stricter adherence to pro-Hindu state and monarchy restoration amid broader dissatisfaction with republican governance's corruption and instability, though talks stalled over power-sharing and policy priorities. These dynamics reflected causal pressures from voter disillusionment with mainstream parties' failures, bolstering Rana's faction's appeal to traditionalist constituencies prioritizing cultural and institutional restoration over expediency. Rana's resolve culminated in a 2019 merger with Lohani's Ekata Rastriya Prajatantra Party (Rastrawadi), forming the Rastriya Prajatantra Party (Samyukta) on January 31, which reaffirmed dual leadership and ideological focus on Hindu Rashtra and Constitutional monarchy, enabling consolidated outreach to bases alienated by multiparty system's inefficiencies. This realignment sustained the party's niche support, as evidenced by its ability to field candidates in subsequent polls drawing from royalist and Hindu revivalist voters, though overall RPP variants garnered under 2% national vote share in 2017 provincial elections, linking turnout gains in conservative strongholds to anti-corruption messaging rooted in pre-republican nostalgia.

=== Later electoral roles ===
Rana was sworn in as the senior-most member of Nepal's House of Representatives (HoR) on December 21, 2022, following his election from the Rastriya Prajatantra Party in the November 2022 general elections. His precedence stemmed from verified age, positioning him to administer oaths to other lawmakers the following day, December 22.

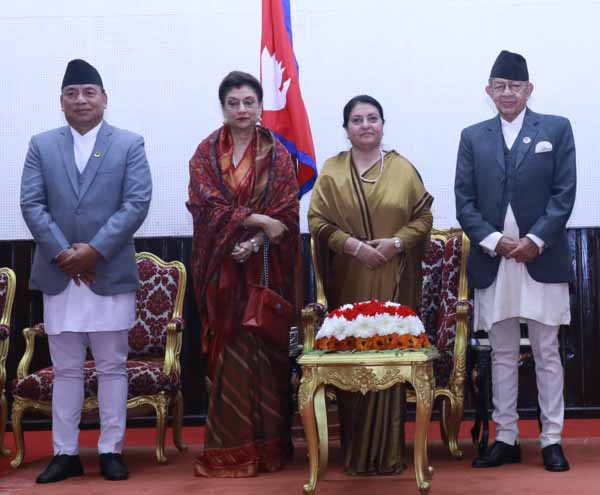
Swearing-in of Pashupati SJB Rana as Speaker

In this capacity, Rana assumed the temporary role of Speaker for the initial HoR session, overseeing parliamentary procedures and pledging impartiality amid political transitions. He described himself as a "guardian of the country," committing to coordinate across parties, advance multiparty democracy, and ensure procedural integrity without favoritism.

Into 2024 and 2025, Rana continued active parliamentary involvement, including service on the Parliamentary Hearing Committee. His public engagements featured critiques of contemporary governance, favoring historical figures like Jung Bahadur Rana for their role in preserving sovereignty through decisive leadership, in contrast to perceived inefficiencies under leaders such as K.P. Sharma Oli. He warned of risks from unbalanced foreign relations with powers like India, China, and the United States, urging skilled diplomacy to safeguard Nepal's independence rather than allowing external pressures to undermine it.

== Titles, styles and honours ==
- 1941-1953: Shree Shree Shree Nati General Pashupati Shumsher Jung Bahadur Rana
- 1953-1967: His Excellency Shree Shree ShreeYuvaraj Pashupati Shumsher Jung Bahadur Rana, Shree Tin Yuvaraj of Nepal
- 1967–present: His Highness Supradipta-Manyabara Svasti Sri Madati Prachandra Bhujadandyetyadi Shree Shree Shree Maharaja Pashupati Shumsher Jung Bahadur Rana, Shree Tin Maharajah of Nepal

National Honours

- Order of the Gurkha Right Hand, First Class.
- King Birendra Corononation Medal (21 February 1975).
- Janamat Sangraha Padak (Medal Service for the Referendum) (1980).

== Electoral history ==
- 1978 House of Representatives Election - Won
- 1982 House of Representatives Election - Won
- 1986 House of Representatives Election - Won
- 1991 House of Representatives Election - Won
- 1994 House of Representatives Election - Won
- 1999 House of Representatives Election - Won
- 2013 Constituent Assembly Election - Lost
- 2013 Constituent Assembly Election - Lost
- 2018 House of Representatives Election - Lost
- 2022 House of Representatives (Upper House) Election - Won

== Notable published works ==
- Nepal's Forth Plan: A Critique (1971).
- Bikas Tatha Yojana (1971).
- Nepal in Perspective (1973).
- Kathmandu; a Living Heritage (1989).
- Contemporary Nepal (1998).
- The Ranas of Nepal (2002).

== See also ==
- Lamjang and Kaski
- Rana dynasty
- Scindia dynasty
