= Sunil Bahadur Thapa =

Nepali politician (born 1959)

- सुनील बहादुर थापा
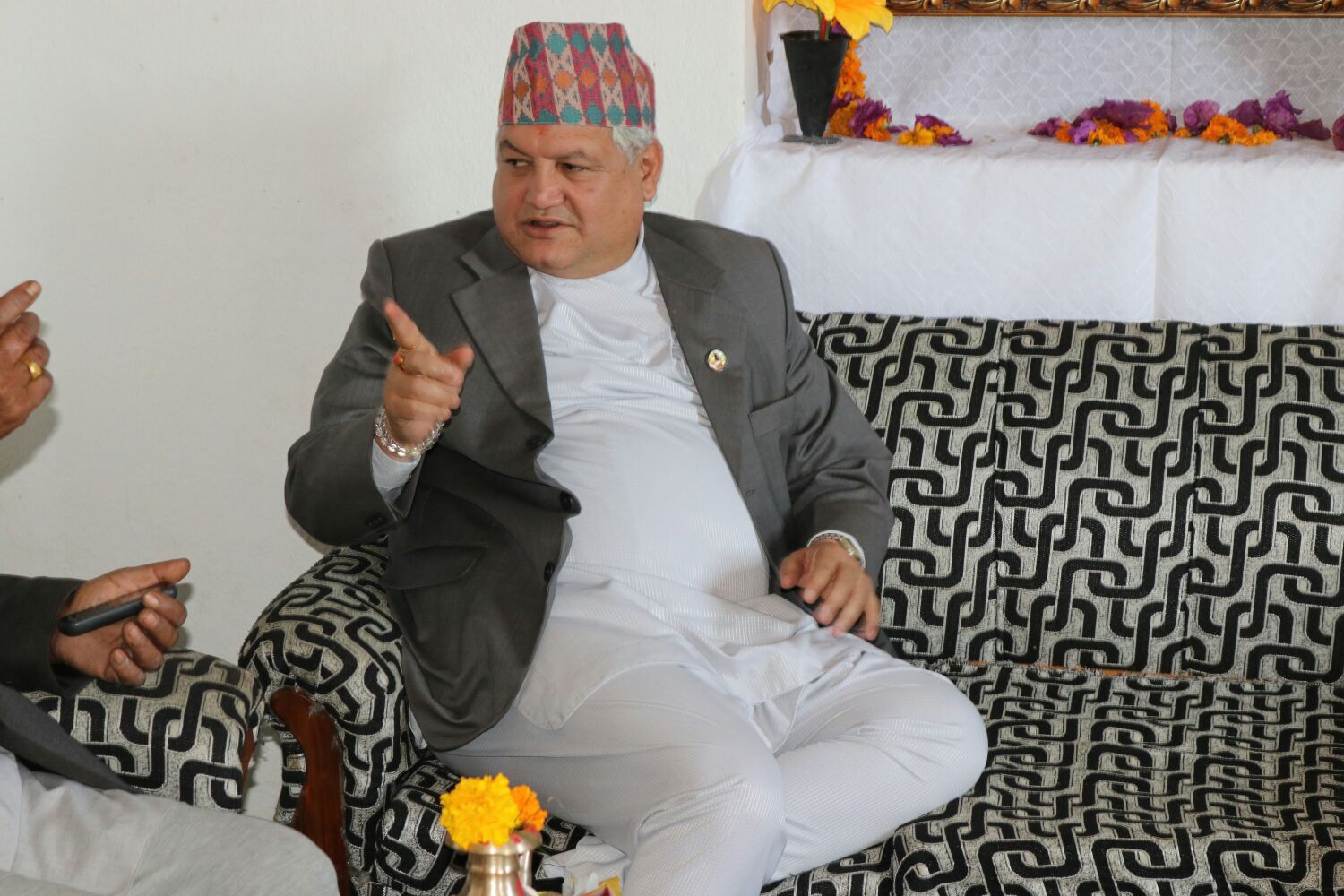
- Sunil Bahadur Thapa at his residence in 2017.

Minister of Industry
- In office 11 September 2017 – 14 February 2018
- President: Bidhya Devi Bhandari
- Prime Minister: Sher Bahadur Deuba
- Preceded by: Nabindra Raj Joshi
- Succeeded by: Matrika Prasad Yadav

Member of the Parliament, National Assembly
- Incumbent
- Assumed office 9 March 2026
- Preceded by: Devendra Dahal
- Constituency: Koshi province

Personal details
- Born: Sunil Bahadur Thapa; 14 April 1959 (age 67) Dhankuta
- Party: Nepali Congress (July 2020-present)
- Other political affiliations: Rastriya Prajatantra Party (until July 2020); Rastriya Prajatantra Party (Samyukta) (2019 - 2020); Rastriya Prajatantra Party (Prajatantrik) (2017 - 2019)
- Spouse: Sangeeta Thapa
- Children: Siddhartha and Seetashma
- Parent: Surya Bahadur Thapa (father)
- Education: Master of Arts (MA)

Sunil Bahadur Thapa (Nepali: सुनील बहादुर थापा; born 14 April 1959) is a Nepali Politician belonging to the Nepali Congress. He is the Member of Parliament in the upper house, the National Assembly. He is the son of the five-time prime minister of Nepal, Surya Bahadur Thapa.

== Early career ==
Sunil Thapa worked with UNHCR from 1988- 2012 a career that spanned twenty two years and took him to disaster prone countries for the protection and reparation of refugees. Early in his career after returning from USA where he was pursuing his degree in Public Administration and Government, Thapa worked in Center for Economic Development and Administration as a consultant. In addition Thapa was also a lecturer at Kathmandu's Tribhuvan University.

=== Political career ===
Sunil Thapa joined politics in September 2012 by taking active party membership of Rashtriya Prajatantra Party. In the general convention of RPP in May 2012 Thapa garnered the second-highest number of votes and was elected to the Central Working Committee of RPP. In November 2012, during the elections of the Constituent Assembly, Thapa was elected MP through the first-past-the-post system from Dhankuta district. Subsequently, Thapa was appointed as Minister of Petroleum, Commerce and Supplies from April 2014 to September 2015. Thapa then played a critical role to facilitate the unification of RPP and RPP-Nepal. During the unified general convention of RPP and RPP Nepal Thapa was elected General Secretary in charge of the party's foreign policy cell in April 2016. Thapa was later inducted into Sher Bahadur Deuba's government as Minister of Industry. Thapa lost the parliamentary elections in November 2017 held in the country. In 2020, Thapa along with other 29 members of Rashtriya Prajatantra Party moved to Nepali Congress.

=== Education ===
Thapa received a Master of Arts (MA) degree in government, with emphasis in public administration from Claremont Graduate School, Claremont, California, U.S.A. Thapa completed his formal school education in 1975 from St. Xavier's School, Jawalakhel, Kathmandu and completed his school leaving certificate (S.L.C.) from Padmodaya Madhyamik Vidhyalaya, under His Majesty's Government Examination Board, Kathmandu, Nepal.

From (1975–1978) he joined Saraswati Multiple Campus, Kathmandu and received certificate in commerce. He completed his Bachelor of Commerce (B.Com.) degree majoring in Business Management from H.L. College of Commerce, Ahemdabad Gujarat University, India. He then moved to United States to receive masters of art degree. In 1983 he completed his Master's of Art in Government with emphasis in Public Administration from Claremont Graduate School, Clarement, California.

=== Personal life ===
Thapa is married to Sangeeta Thapa, who owns a prominent art gallery, Siddhartha Art Gallery, in Kathmandu. He has one son, Siddhartha, and a daughter, Seetashma.
