= Rastriya Prajatantra Party (Samyukta) =

Rastriya Prajatantra Party (United) राष्ट्रिय प्रजातन्त्र पार्टी (संयुक्त)
- Abbreviation: RPP (U)
- Chairperson: Pashupati SJB Rana; Prakash Chandra Lohani
- Founded: 6 August 2017 (8 years ago)
- Dissolved: 12 March 2020
- Split from: Rastriya Prajatantra Party
- Merged into: Rastriya Prajatantra Party
- Headquarters: Charumati Vihar, Chabahil
- Ideology: Conservatism; Hindu nationalism Royalism
- Political position: Centre-right to right-wing

Election symbol
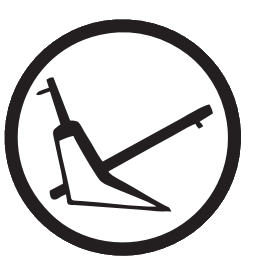

Rastriya Prajantantra Party (Samyukta) (Nepali: राष्ट्रिय प्रजातन्त्र पार्टी (संयुक्त)), literally the National Democratic Party (United) and abbreviated RPP (U), was a political party in Nepal. It was formed on 6 August 2017 by Pashupati Shamsher Jang Bahadur Rana after splitting from the Rastriya Prajatantra Party as the Rastriya Prajatantra Party (Democratic). On 31 January 2019, it merged with the Unified Rastriya Prajatantra Party (Nationalist), another splinter group of the Rastriya Prajatantra Party, to form Samyukta.

== History ==
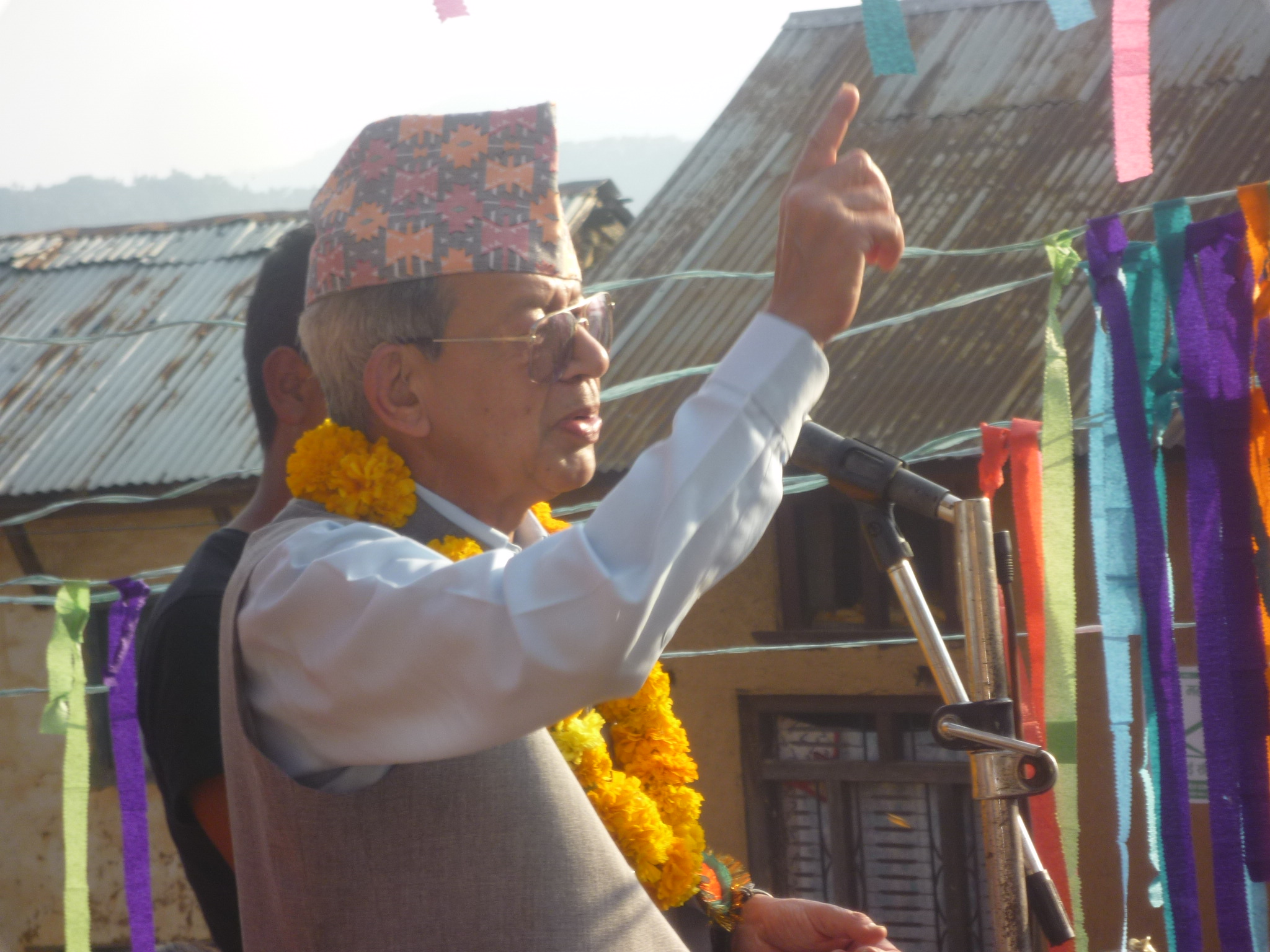
Pashupati Shamsher Jang Bahadur Rana, the party chairman

=== Formation ===
The Rastriya Prajatantra Party (Democratic) was formed by Pashupati SJB Rana after disagreements with Rastriya Prajatantra Party chairman Kamal Thapa about joining the government. The party was formed with 18 members to the Legislature Parliament of Nepal from Rastriya Prajatantra Party. The party was absent for the vote on the constitution amendment bill on 22 August 2017.

The party joined the Sher Bahadur Deuba led government on 10 September 2017. Deepak Bohara, Bikram Panday and Sunil Bahadur Thapa were inducted as ministers in the cabinet. Deepak Bohara was also elected parliamentary party leader. Two more ministers were inducted in the cabinet on 17 September 2017.

=== Merger and dissolution ===
In response the electoral alliance by the Communist Party of Nepal (Unified Marxist–Leninist) and the Communist Party of Nepal (Maoist Centre), the party joined an electoral alliance with Nepali Congress and the Rastriya Prajatantra Party. In the 2017 legislative and provincial elections, the party did not win any seat to the House of Representatives. The party did win a single seat to the Provincial Assembly of Province No. 3 however through proportional representation. The party merged into Rastriya Prajatantra Party on March 12, 2020.

== Electoral performance ==
Election	Leader	Votes		Seats		Position	Resulting government
Election	Leader	No.	%	No.	+/-	Position	Resulting government
2017	Pashupati SJB Rana	88,377	0.93	0 / 275		8th	In opposition

== Presence in various provinces ==
Province	Seats	Year of election
Province No. 3	1 / 110	2017

== Leadership ==
=== Chairmen ===
- Pashupati SJB Rana, 2017–2020
- Prakash Chandra Lohani, 2019–2020

== See also ==
- Rastriya Prajatantra Party
- Rastriya Prajatantra Party Nepal
