= Rosan Karki =

Nepalese politician

Honourable Rosan Karki

Member of Parliament, Pratinidhi Sabha for Rastriya Prajatantra Party
- Incumbent
- Assumed office 2022
- Constituency: PR list

Personal details
- Party: Rastriya Prajatantra Party
- Other party: Rastriya Prajatantra Party
- Parents: Gaj Bahadur (father); Chandra Kumari (mother)

Rosan Karki is a Nepalese politician, belonging to the Rastriya Prajatantra Party. She is currently serving as a member of the 2nd Federal Parliament of Nepal. In the 2022 Nepalese general election she was elected as a proportional representative from the Khas people category.
