= National Democratic Youth Front =

Youth organisation in Nepal

National Democratic Youth Front राष्ट्रिय प्रजातान्त्रिक युवा संगठन
- President: Sujit KC
- Founded: 1978
- Headquarters: Kathmandu
- Mother party: Rastriya Prajatantra Party
- International affiliation: International Young Democrat Union

National Democratic Youth Front is a youth organisation in Nepal. It is the student wing of the Constitutional monarchist Rastriya Prajatantra Party.
