= National Democratic Women's Union =

Nepalese political organization

- Type: Women's wing
- Purpose: Integral humanism Conservatism; Hindu Nationalism
- Headquarters: Kathmandu
- President: Anjana Sah Rawal
- Parent organization: Rastriya Prajatantra Party

National Democratic Women's Union (Nepali: राष्ट्रिय प्रजातान्त्रिक महिला संघ) is a women's organisation in Nepal, politically aligned with the Rastriya Prajatantra Party.
