= Rastriya Prajatantra Party =

Political party

National Democratic Party राष्ट्रिय प्रजातन्त्र पार्टी
- Abbreviation: RPP
- Chairman: Rajendra Lingden
- Spokesperson: Gyanendra Shahi
- Senior Deputy Chairman: Rabindra Mishra
- Deputy Chairman: Bikram Pandey; Budhhiman Tamang; Dhruba Bahadur Pradhan; Rosan Karki
- Founded: 29 May 1990 (36 years ago)
- Headquarters: Charumati Bihar, Chabahil, Kathmandu, Nepal
- Student wing: National Democratic Student Organization
- Youth wing: National Democratic Youth Front
- Women's wing: National Democratic Women's Union
- Membership: 11,50,000
- Ideology: Hindu nationalism; Constitutional monarchism; Economic liberalism
- Political position: Right-wing
- International affiliation: International Democracy Union; Asia Pacific Democrat Union
- Colours: yellow
- Slogan: Nationalism, Democracy and Liberalism
- ECN Status: National Party (6th largest)
- Seats in Pratinidhi Sabha: 5 / 275
- Seats in Rastriya Sabha: 0 / 59
- Seats in Provincial Assemblies: 28 / 550
- Mayors/Chairs: 4 / 753
- Councillors: 305 / 35,011

Election symbol
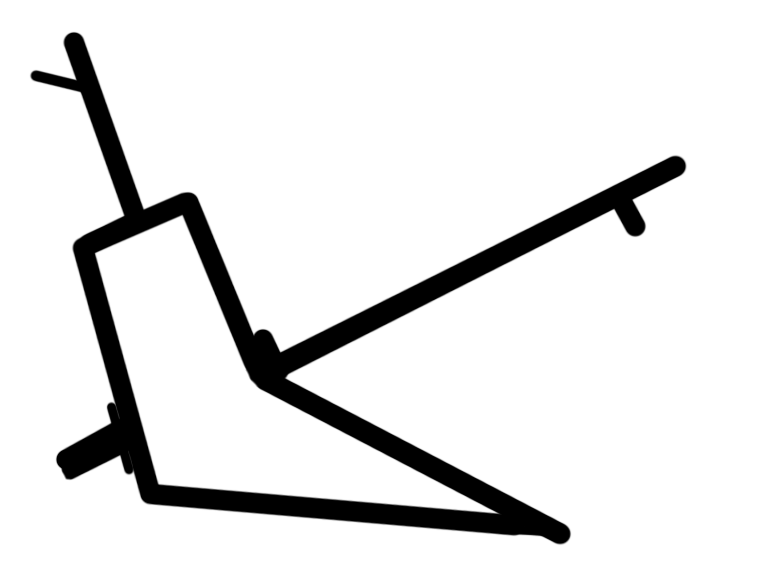
- Plough

Party flag
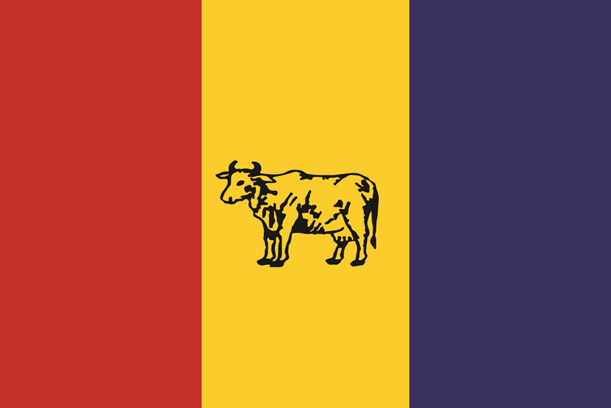

Website
- rpp.org.np

The Rastriya Prajatantra Party (Note: Nepali pronunciation: [rasʈrijʌ prʌˈd͡zatʌntrʌ ˈpa(r)ʈi]; Nepali: राष्ट्रिय प्रजातन्त्र पार्टी, lit. 'National Democratic Party') (RPP) (Note: RaPraPa; Nepali: राप्रपा) is a constitutional monarchist and Hindu nationalist political party in Nepal. Rastriya Prajatantra Party is currently the sixth largest political party in the House of Representatives after winning 5 seats at the 2026 general election and is one of six national parties recognized by the Election Commission.

The party was formed by Panchayat era prime ministers Surya Bahadur Thapa and Lokendra Bahadur Chand in 1990. The party led two coalition governments in 1997 under Thapa and Chand. The two were also appointed prime minister by King Gyanendra in the 2000s; Chand in 2002 and Thapa in 2003.

Rajendra Prasad Lingden is currently serving as party chairman after being elected at the party's general convention in December 2021. Rastriya Prajatantra Party remained as the fifth-largest political party in the House of Representatives after winning 14 seats at the 2022 general election and was one of seven national parties recognized by the Election Commission.

== History ==
=== Founding and early years, 1990–1994 ===
The Rastriya Prajatantra Party was formed by the ruling elite of the Panchayat era on 29 May 1990. The party split in the same year after another group also registered itself with the Election Commission. The two parties had the same name, ideology and statute but different flags and election symbols. The two parties, one led by Surya Bahadur Thapa and the other led by Lokendra Bahadur Chand, contested the 1991 elections. The two parties won four seats between them with Chand's party winning three seats and Thapa's party winning one seat. Following their performance at the elections the two parties agreed to merge into a single Rastriya Prajatantra Party on 8 February 1992.

The party held its first general convention from in 1992 from 11 to 16 June in Kathmandu and unanimously elected Surya Bahadur Thapa as its chairman. Lokendra Bahadur Chand and Rajeshwor Devkota were elected leader and co-chairman, respectively. The party emerged as a third force at the 1992 local elections and the 1994 general elections. The party received 18 percent of the votes and won 20 seats to the House of Representatives, making them the third largest party in the parliament.

=== Government and second split, 1995–1999 ===
==== Coalition governments, 1995–1997 ====
The party initially supported the minority government of CPN (UML) but later withdrew their support and backed a no-confidence motion Manmohan Adhikari. The party then joined a coalition government with Nepali Congress and Nepal Sadbhawana Party under the premiership of Congress leader Sher Bahadur Deuba. A faction of the party led by former prime minister Lokendra Bahadur Chand were dissatisfied with the coalition government and in March 1996 some cabinet ministers close to Chand withdrew their support for the Deuba government and resigned before a no-confidence vote was set to table by the opposition CPN (UML). The ministers withdrew their resignation before the no-confidence vote and Deuba won the confidence vote. Six cabinet ministers close to Chand again resigned from the government in December 1996 but supported Deuba in the confidence vote later and rejoined the cabinet.

==== Chand and Thapa governments, 1997–1998 ====
In March 1997, a faction of the party led by Lokendra Bahadur Chand joined a coalition government with CPN (UML), with Chand as prime minister. On 3 October 1997, the faction led by Surya Bahadur Thapa voted for a no-confidence motion tabled by Nepali Congress and toppled the government. Thapa was then made the prime minister on 6 October 1997 with the support of Congress.

After losing support within his party Thapa asked King Birendra to dissolve the house and call for fresh elections. After the recommendation of the Supreme Court, the King called forth a special session of the parliament to debate the no-confidence motion filed against Thapa. Thapa survived the no-confidence vote and expelled six central committee members for threatening to back a no-confidence motion against him.

The second general convention of the party took place from 12 to 16 November 1997 in Birgunj. Surya Bahadur Thapa was re-elected for a second term as chairman. Prakash Chandra Lohani, Pashupati SJB Rana and Kamal Thapa were nominated as vice-chairman, general secretary and spokesman respectively. Lokendra Bahadur Chand however created his own Rastriya Prajatantra Party on 9 January 1998 claiming that Thapa had mismanaged the party, did not listen to the directions of the central committee and accused Thapa of not holding the general election in a fair manner. He broke off with 10 members of parliament including 8 from the House of Representatives and 2 from the National Assembly. Thapa resigned as prime minister on 10 April 1998 and was replaced by Nepali Congress president Girija Prasad Koirala.

The two parties contested the 1999 elections and fared badly in the election with the party winning 11 seats and the party led by Chand not winning any seats. Following the elections, the parties decided to merge again on 31 December 1999. A group led by Rajeshwor Devkota however decided not to rejoin the party and formed their own Rastriya Prajatantra Party (Nationalist).

=== Direct rule and internal conflicts, 2002–2015 ===
==== Second Chand and Thapa governments, 2002–2006 ====
King Gyanendra dismissed the government of Sher Bahadur Deuba on 4 October 2002 after failing to conduct the elections following the dissolution of the House of Representatives on May earlier that year. Lokendra Bahadur Chand was then appointed as prime minister on 11 October 2002. He resigned on 31 May 2003 after protests from opposition parties calling for the restoration of the parliament and the formation of a national consensus government. Chand had also faced accusations from within his party of failing to address these issues. He was replaced by Surya Bahadur Thapa on 5 June 2002.

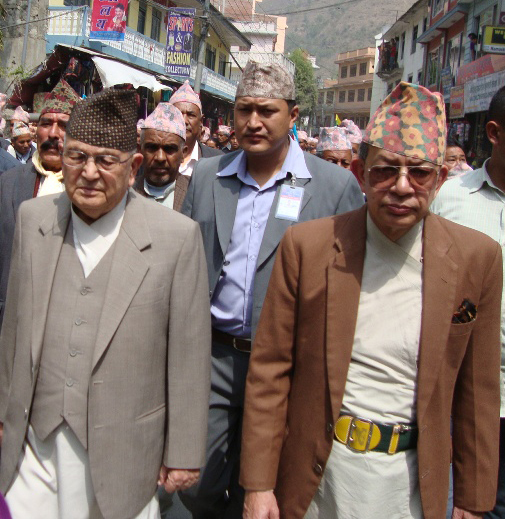
Former party chairmen, Surya Bahadur Thapa and Pashupati SJB Rana

At the third general convention of the party held in Pokhara from 12 to 14 December 2002, Surya Bahadur Thapa completed his second four-year term as party chairman and could not compete for the post of chairman again as per the party constitution. Pashupati Shamsher Jang Bahadur Rana was elected chairman during the convention and Padma Sundar Lawati, Kamal Thapa and Rosan Karki were nominated vice-president, general secretary and spokesperson respectively.

There were calls within the party for Surya Bahadur Thapa to resign as prime minister for undermining democracy by failing to form a national consensus government. He resigned on 7 May 2004, and was replaced by Nepali Congress (Democratic) leader Sher Bahadur Deuba. On 4 November 2004, Thapa announced that he would be quitting the party and forming a new centre-right liberal party. The party was formally launched on 13 March 2005 as Rastriya Janashakti Party.

On 1 February 2005, King Gyanendra dismissed Deuba as prime minister and seized executive powers in a royal coup d'état. The party announced their support for the pro-democracy agitation led by the Seven Party Alliance but ten members of the party's central committee, including Kamal Thapa who had rejoined the party after leaving for Janashakti, supported the coup. Thapa along with six central committee members were appointed to the King's cabinet in December 2005 with Thapa becoming Home Minister.

On 10 January 2006, members of the central committee close to Kamal Thapa voted to replace Pashupati Shamsher Jang Bahadur Rana as party chairman with Thapa. Thapa's claim as new chairman was dismissed by other members of the party. Thapa's faction of the party contested the 2006 local elections that was boycotted by the Seven Party Alliance and the Rana faction of the party. The party won mayoral positions in major cities including Kathmandu, Pokhara, Bharatpur and Dhangadhi in an election marred by a lack of candidates, violence and low turnout. The party members that supported Thapa, including six incumbent cabinet ministers, were expelled. On 28 October 2006, they formed their own party, the royalist Rastriya Prajatantra Party Nepal, under the leadership of Kamal Thapa.

==== Constituent Assembly, 2007–2015 ====
The party held its fourth general convention from 9 to 11 December 2007 and re-elected Pashupati SJB Rana as party chairman. Following the 2006 revolution a national consensus government under the leadership of Girija Prasad Koirala was formed. The parliament was reinstated and eventually transformed into the Interim Legislature Parliament after including the Maoists. The party had eight seats in the parliament but two MPs, Budhhiman Tamang and Brijesh Kumar Gupta, were dismissed because of their support of the royal coup.

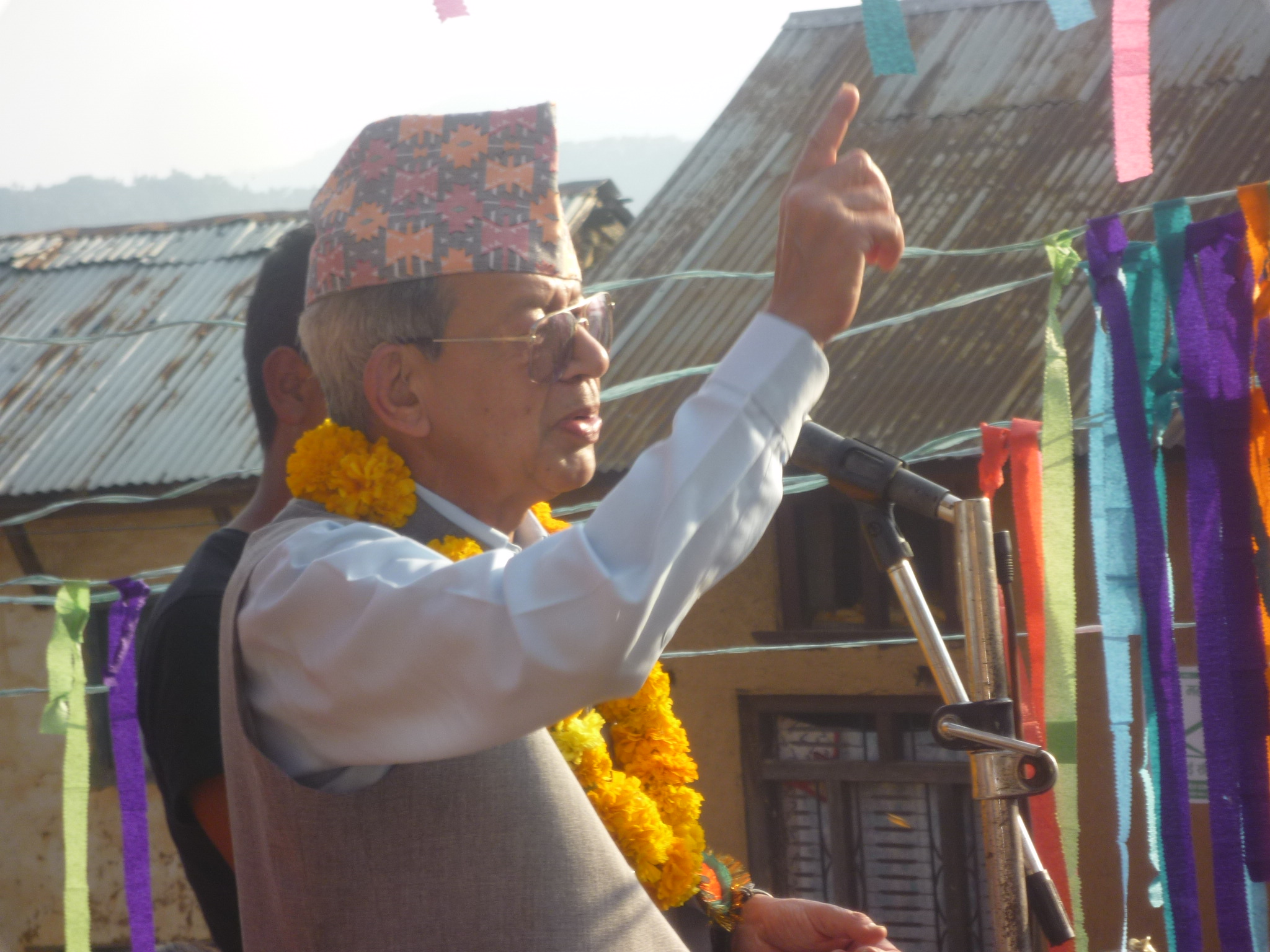
Pashupati SJB Rana: former chairperson of the party

In the 2008 elections the party failed to win a seat from the constituency vote but got 2.45% of the party list votes and won 8 seats to the 1st Constituent Assembly through the party-list proportional representation system. Party chairman Pashupati SJB Rana also lost from Sindhupalchowk 1. On 28 May 2008, at the first session of the 1st Constituent Assembly. The party voted in favor of abolishing the monarchy and turning Nepal into a republic. Lokendra Bahadur Chand who was serving as the parliamentary party leader of the party was absent during the vote. The party joined the Madhav Kumar Nepal led government in June 2009.

At the party's fifth general convention from 17 to 19 May 2013, the Rastriya Janashakti Party merged into the party and Surya Bahadur Thapa was elected as the chairman of the unified party. It was also decided that the senior leadership would rotate annually between Surya Bahadur Thapa, Lokendra Bahadur Chand, Pashupati Shamsher Jang Bahadur Rana and Prakash Chandra Lohani. In the 2013 elections, the party won constituency seats in Rupandehi 2, Chitwan 5 and Dhankuta 2 and got 2.75% of the party list votes and won 10 seats through the party-list proportional representation system for a total of 13 seats in the 2nd Constituent Assembly. The party supported the CPN (UML)–Nepali Congress coalition government under Sushil Koirala following the election and sent two ministers to the cabinet.

=== Federal Nepal, 2016–present ===
Flag of the Rastriya Prajatantra Party until 2016

==== Continued internal conflicts, 2016–2020 ====
On 21 November 2016, the party announced its unification with the Kamal Thapa led Rastriya Prajatantra Party Nepal. The new party retained the name of Rastriya Prajatantra Party. The new party had a total strength of 37 in the Parliament of Nepal, becoming the fourth largest party. Thapa was elected as chairman of the party in a special general convention in Kathmandu in February 2017. The party joined the coalition government on 9 March 2017 under CPN (Maoist Centre) chairman Pushpa Kamal Dahal with Kamal Thapa serving as deputy prime minister. Prakash Chandra Lohani split away from the party following the decision to join the government and because of issues regarding the electoral symbol of the party. He announced the formation of Ekikrit Rastriya Prajatantra Party (Nationalist) on 29 March 2017. Another split occurred on 6 August 2017 after Pashupati SJB Rana broke away forming Rastriya Prajatantra Party (Democratic). The party joined the coalition government under Nepali Congress president Sher Bahadur Deuba on 13 October 2017 with Kamal Thapa again serving as deputy prime minister.

In the 2017 general and provincial elections, Rastriya Prajantatra Party formed an alliance with Nepali Congress and Rastriya Prajatantra Party (Democratic). The party only won one seat to the House of Representatives and party chairman Kamal Thapa lost in Makwanpur 1. Only general secretary Rajendra Lingden was elected from Jhapa 3 after forging an electoral pact with the Left Alliance against Nepali Congress in some eastern districts including Jhapa. The party got 2.06% of the party list votes and could not become a national party after failing to pass the 3% threshold in party list voting. The party also won one seat each to provincial assemblies of Province 1, Province 3 and Province 6.

==== Re-unification and new leadership, 2020–2023 ====
The Rastriya Prajatantra Party (Samyukta), created through the merger of Rana and Lohani's splinter groups, merged with the party on 12 March 2020, with Kamal Thapa, Pashupati Shamsher Jang Bahadur Rana and Prakash Chandra Lohani all acting as chairs. In July 2020, Sunil Bahadur Thapa, the son of former prime minister Surya Bahadur Thapa, resigned from the party and joined Nepali Congress. The party conducted its general convention from 1 to 3 December 2021 and elected Rajendra Prasad Lingden as the party's chairman. He defeated former deputy prime minister and incumbent party chairman Kamal Thapa at the general convention. The party also announced that it had 150,000 active party members. The general convention also elected Nepalgunj mayor Dhawal Shamsher Rana as the party's general secretary and former member of constituent assembly Bikram Pandey as the party vice-president. Following the general convention, Kamal Thapa left the party and revived the Rastriya Prajatantra Party Nepal.

The party announced intentions to unify other pro-monarchist groups under their umbrella and groups including Nepal Ka Lagi Nepali Campaign, Mission Nepal, Gorach Abhiyan and the Gyanendra Shahi led Hamro Nepal Hami Nepali Campaign joined the party in the following months. Former chairman of Bibeksheel Sajha Party, Rabindra Mishra also joined the party on 28 September 2022 as senior vice-president. The Janatantrik Terai Mukti Morcha also merged with the party on 5 October.

The party fielded 140 candidates to the House of Representatives at the 2022 general and provincial elections and forged an election pact with CPN (UML) in Jhapa, Banke and Rupandehi districts. Party chairman Rajendra Lingden retained his seat in Jhapa 3 and the party gained 6 more direct seats. The party also got 5.58% of the party list vote to become one of seven national parties in the Federal Parliament. The party won 7 proportional seats for a total of 14 seats at the House of Representatives. The party was also successful in winning seats to all seven provincial assemblies.

The party joined the coalition government of Pushpa Kamal Dahal following the election with three cabinet ministers and one state minister, with party president Lingden serving as deputy prime minister. The party withdrew from the coalition after a month.

==== Pro-Monarchy Protests, 2023–present ====
In January 2024, the former king Gyanendra met with five MPs from the party. The party launched sporadic protests calling for the restoration of the monarchy throughout the year. In March 2025, the party along with other pro-monarchists groups welcomed the former king back at the Tribhuvan International Airport. Later in the month a joint movement committee was formed under the leadership of Nava Raj Subedi to launch a movement to reinstate a Hindu kingdom. Senior party leaders were named as members, but the party denied any association with the movement. Senior deputy chairman Rabindra Mishra and general secretary Dhawal Shamsher Rana joined the committee and organized a rally for restoration of the monarchy. Two people died and forty five people were injured after the rally turned violent and the two leaders along with other members of the committee were arrested.

Senior leaders Pashupati SJB Rana and Prakash Chandra Lohani led protests by the party in favor of releasing the protestors and demanded an independent investigation into the incident. After weeks of protest by the party and other pro-monarchy groups, another large protest took place on Republic Day in May 2025. Mishra and Rana were subsequently released from custody on bail .

Party chair Lingden removed Nava Raj Subedi as coordinator of the discipline committee claiming that Subedi had publicly announced his exit from the party. The move was criticized by general secretary Rana and other members who petitioned the Election Commission against the decision. Nominated vice-chairman Mukunda Shyam Giri was removed from his position and as central committee member after issuing a statement against the removal.

The party formed a committee to pursue unity and alliance with other parties in November 2025 and on 31 December 2025, Rastriya Prajatantra Party Nepal led by former party chairman Kamal Thapa reunified with the party.

== Ideology ==
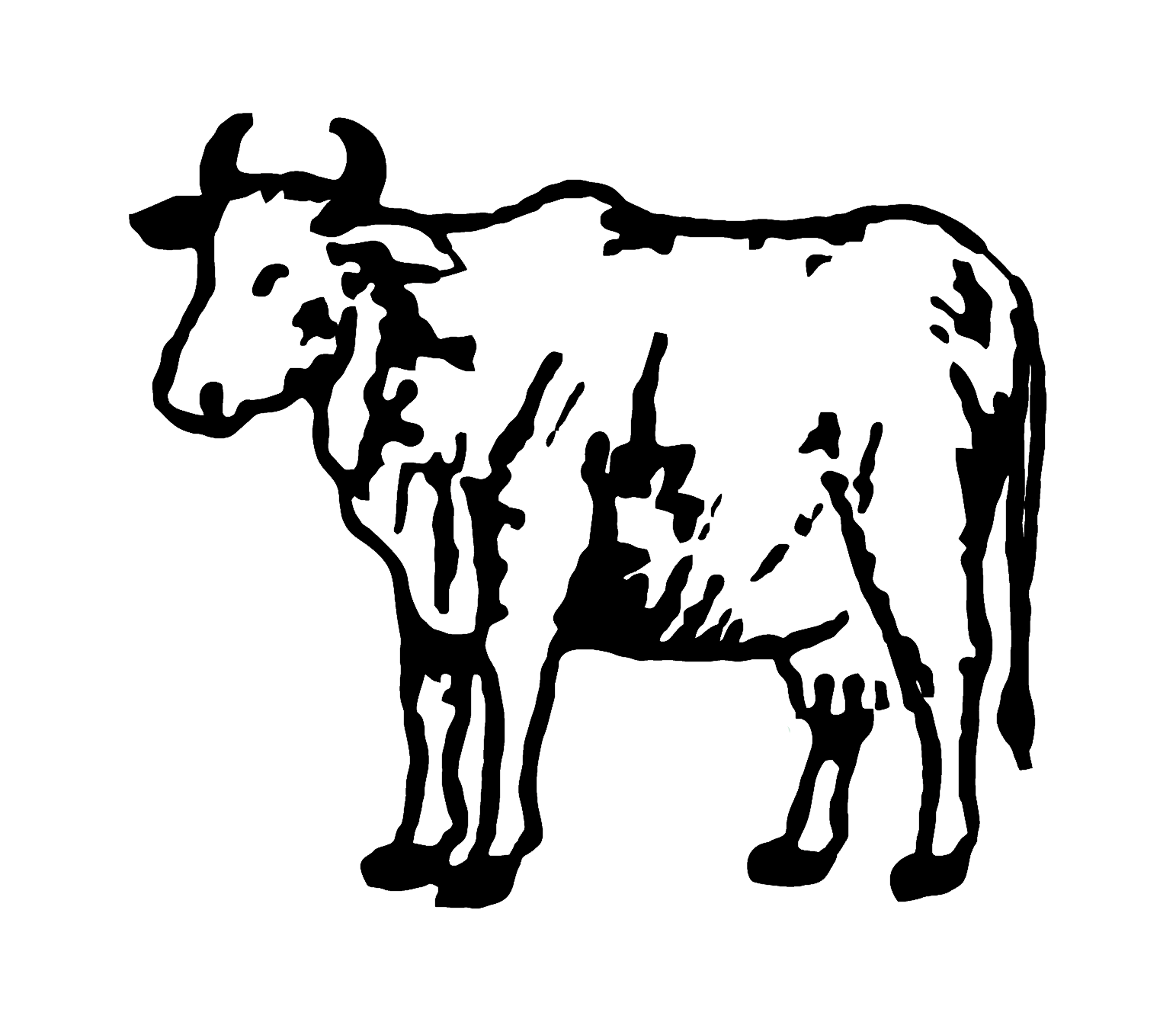
Electoral symbol of the Thapa group until merger and from 2016–2020

The Rastriya Prajatantra Party was established as an alternative force to the major political parties, Nepali Congress and Communist Party of Nepal (Unified Marxist–Leninist). The party was founded on the principles of democracy, constitutional monarchy, nationalism and economic liberalism. It supported a welfare state and cultural pluralism. At the time of the party's foundation Surya Bahadur Thapa's party was considered as the more liberal party and Lokendra Bahadur Chand's party was considered as the Pashupati SJB Rana more conservative party.

=== Monarchy and federal structure ===
In the early 2000s the party supported the position of a benevolent monarch during times of crises. At the first session of the 1st Constituent Assembly, the party voted to abolish the monarchy and turn Nepal into a secular republic. Later however, the party advocated for turning Nepal into a Hindu republic. Rastriya Prajatantra Party Nepal, a splinter group of the party which had voted against abolishing the monarchy changed its constitution to support the re-establishment of the Hindu state and a return to constitutional monarchy. After the merger between the two parties in November 2016 it was announced that the unified party would take up the constitution of Rastriya Prajatantra Party Nepal. The party has stated support for a Sanatan Hindu state with full religious freedom and registered an amendment proposal for such on 19 March 2017. The Election Commission removed the portion of the party statute that advocated for a Hindu state and monarchy on 17 March 2017 and asked the party to remove the provisions again on 22 January 2022 claiming that it was against Article 260 of the Constitution of Nepal.

The party supports a ceremonial monarch, a directly elected prime minister and a fully proportional parliament. The party also calls for the scrapping of the provincial governments claiming that it is an expensive experiment. The party wants to instead strengthen the local governments and create a two-tier federal structure.

== Electoral performance ==
=== Legislative elections ===
% Votes of RPP and its splinter groups

_{11.94}

5.38

6.56

1991

_{17.93}

17.93

1994

_{13.85}

10.44

3.41

1999

_{4.43}

2.45

0.95

1.03

2008

_{9.41}

2.75

6.66

2013

_{3.29}

2.06

0.93

0.30

2017

_{5.7}

5.58

0.12

2022

_{9.51}

RPP (6.66)

RPP (C) (1.42)

RJSP (0.14)

RPPN (1.12)

RPP(D) (0.13)

URPP(N) (0.04)

Average

=== Kingdom of Nepal ===
Election	Leader	Constituency Votes			Seats		Position	Resulting government
Election	Leader	No.	%	±	No.	±	Position	Resulting government
1991	Surya Bahadur Thapa	392,499	5.38	—N/a	1 / 205	—N/a	7th	Opposition
1991	Lokendra Bahadur Chand	478,604	6.56	—N/a	3 / 205	—N/a	5th	Opposition
1994	Surya Bahadur Thapa	1,367,148	17.93	—N/a	20 / 205	▲19	▲3rd	External support
1994	Surya Bahadur Thapa	1,367,148	17.93	—N/a	20 / 205	▲19	▲3rd	In coalition
1994	Surya Bahadur Thapa	1,367,148	17.93	—N/a	20 / 205	▲19	▲3rd	Leading coalition
1994	Surya Bahadur Thapa	1,367,148	17.93	—N/a	20 / 205	▲19	▲3rd	Opposition
1999	Surya Bahadur Thapa	903,328	10.43	▼7.50	11 / 205	▼9	3rd	Opposition
1999	Lokendra Bahadur Chand	293,952	3.41	—N/a	0 / 205	—N/a	9th	Opposition

=== Constituent assembly ===
Election	Leader	Constituency Votes			Proportional Votes			Seats		Position	Resulting government
Election	Leader	No.	%	±	No.	%	±	No.	±	Position	Resulting government
2008	Pashupati SJB Rana	310,214	3.01	▼7.42	263,431	2.45	—N/a	8 / 575	▼3	▼8th	Opposition
2008	Pashupati SJB Rana	310,214	3.01	▼7.42	263,431	2.45	—N/a	8 / 575	▼3	▼8th	In coalition
2008	Pashupati SJB Rana	310,214	3.01	▼7.42	263,431	2.45	—N/a	8 / 575	▼3	▼8th	Opposition
2013	Surya Bahadur Thapa	238,313	2.63	▼0.38	260,234	2.75	▲0.30	13 / 575	▲5	▲6th	In coalition

=== Federal parliament ===
Election	Leader	Constituency Votes			Proportional Votes			Seats		Position	Resulting government
Election	Leader	No.	%	±	No.	%	±	No.	±	Position	Resulting government
2017	Kamal Thapa	118,318	1.18	▼1.45	196,782	2.06 (Note: Represented as Independent for not reaching the 3% threshold)	▼0.57	1 / 275	▼12	▼7th	Opposition
2022	Rajendra Prasad Lingden	549,340	5.24	▲4.06	588,849	5.58	▲3.52	14 / 275	▲13	▲5th	In coalition
2022	Rajendra Prasad Lingden	549,340	5.24	▲4.06	588,849	5.58	▲3.52	14 / 275	▲13	▲5th	Opposition
2026	Rajendra Prasad Lingden	207,270	1.97	▼3.27	330,684	3.05	▼2.53	5 / 275	▼9	▼6th	Opposition

=== Provincial assemblies ===
Province	Election	Votes	%	Seats	±	Status
Koshi	2022	198,511	10.45 (4th)	6 / 93	▲5	Opposition
Madhesh	2022	65,054	3.12 (8th)	1 / 107	▲1	Opposition
Bagmati	2022	275,562	14.23 (4th)	13 / 110	▲11	Opposition
Gandaki	2022	59,483	6.03 (4th)	2 / 60	▲2	Opposition
Lumbini	2022	127,452	6.75 (4th)	4 / 87	▲4	Opposition
Karnali	2022	25,186	4.36 (5th)	1 / 40	Steady	Opposition
Sudurpashchim	2022	44,233	4.93 (6th)	1 / 53	▲1	Opposition

== Leadership ==
=== Chairpersons ===
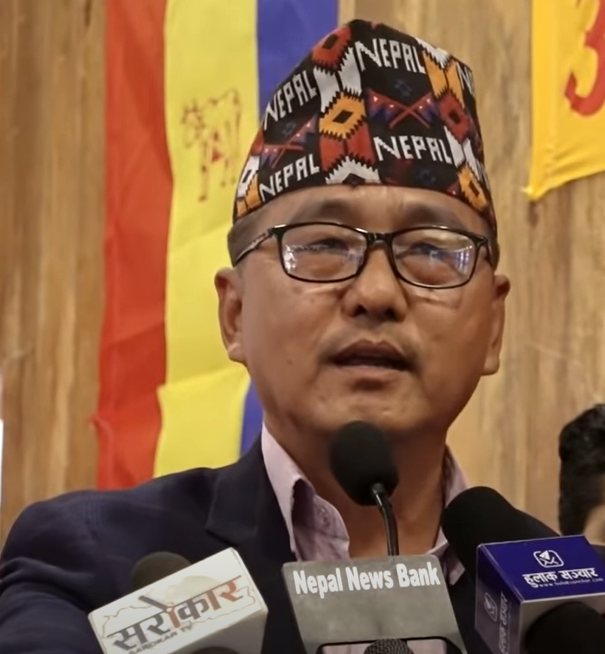
Current party chairman, Rajendra Prasad Lingden

- Surya Bahadur Thapa (1990–2002, 2013–2014)
- Pashupati SJB Rana (2002–2013, 2014–2016, 2020–2021)
- Kamal Thapa (2016–2021)
- Prakash Chandra Lohani (2020–2021)
- Rajendra Lingden (2021–present)

=== Prime Ministers ===
No.	Prime Minister	Portrait	Terms in Office			Legislature	Cabinet	Constituency
No.	Prime Minister	Portrait	Start	End	Tenure	Legislature	Cabinet	Constituency
1.	Lokendra Bahadur Chand		12 March 1997	7 October 1997	209 days	3rd House of Representatives	Chand, 1997	Baitadi 2
1.	Lokendra Bahadur Chand		11 October 2002	5 June 2003	237 days	Appointed by King Gyanendra	Chand, 2002	
2.	Surya Bahadur Thapa		7 October 1997	15 April 1998	190 days	3rd House of Representatives	Thapa, 1998	Dhankuta 2
2.	Surya Bahadur Thapa		5 June 2003	4 September 2004	1 year, 91 days	Appointed by King Gyanendra	Thapa, 2003	

=== Deputy Prime Ministers ===
No.	Deputy PM	Portrait	Terms in Office			Legislature	Cabinet	Constituency
No.	Deputy PM	Portrait	Start	End	Tenure	Legislature	Cabinet	Constituency
1.	Kamal Thapa		12 October 2015	4 August 2016	297 days	Constituent Assembly	Oli, 2015	Party list
1.	Kamal Thapa		17 October 2017	14 February 2018	120 days	Constituent Assembly	Deuba, 2017	Party list
2.	Rajendra Prasad Lingden		17 January 2023	25 February 2023	39 days	2nd Federal Parliament	Dahal, 2023	Jhapa 3

== Current leadership ==
No.	Portfolio	Office holder	Terms in Office		
No.	Portfolio	Office holder	Start	End	Tenure
1.	Chairman	Rajendra Prasad Lingden	5 December 2021	Incumbent	4 years, 343 days
2.	Senior Deputy Chairman	Rabindra Mishra	28 September 2022	Incumbent	4 years, 46 days
3.	Deputy Chairman	Bikram Pandey	5 December 2021	Incumbent	4 years, 343 days
3.	Deputy Chairman	Buddhi Man Tamang	5 December 2021	Incumbent	4 years, 343 days
3.	Deputy Chairman	Dhruba Bahadur Pradhan	5 December 2021	Incumbent	4 years, 343 days
3.	Deputy Chairman	Roshan Karki	5 December 2021	Incumbent	4 years, 343 days
3.	Deputy Chairman	Hemjung Gurung	5 December 2021	Incumbent	4 years, 343 days
3.	Deputy Chairman	Mukundashyam Giri	5 December 2021	Incumbent	4 years, 343 days
4.	General Secretary	Dhawal Shamsher Rana	5 December 2021	4 June 2026	4 years, 181 days
4.	General Secretary	Bhuwan Kumar Pathak	5 December 2021	Incumbent	4 years, 343 days
4.	General Secretary	Kunti Shahi	5 December 2021	Incumbent	4 years, 343 days
4.	General Secretary	Rajendra Gurung	31 January 2022	Incumbent	4 years, 286 days
4.	General Secretary	Pralhad Prasad Sah	31 January 2022	Incumbent	4 years, 286 days
4.	General Secretary	Sharad Raj Pathak	22 December 2022	6 September 2026	3 years, 258 days
5.	Spokesperson	Bhakti Prasad Sitaula	31 January 2022	Incumbent	4 years, 286 days
5.	Spokesperson	Mohan Shrestha	31 January 2022	Incumbent	4 years, 286 days
5.	Spokesperson	Sagun Sundar Lawati	31 January 2022	Incumbent	4 years, 286 days
5.	Spokesperson	Gopal Dahal	31 January 2022	Incumbent	4 years, 286 days
5.	Spokesperson	Gyanendra Shahi	15 February 2021	Incumbent	4 years, 271 days
6.	Joint General Secretary	Mohan Prasad Yadav	31 January 2022	Incumbent	4 years, 286 days
6.	Joint General Secretary	Dhan Bahadur Budha	31 January 2022	Incumbent	4 years, 286 days
6.	Joint General Secretary	Shyam Bahadur Shahi	31 January 2022	Incumbent	4 years, 286 days
6.	Joint General Secretary	Prakash Rimal	31 January 2022	Incumbent	4 years, 286 days
6.	Joint General Secretary	Rabindra Pratap Shah	31 January 2022	Incumbent	4 years, 286 days
6.	Joint General Secretary	Jhanak Pyakurel	31 January 2022	Incumbent	4 years, 286 days
6.	Joint General Secretary	Reena Gurung	31 January 2022	Incumbent	4 years, 286 days
7.	Assistant Spokesperson	Pravin Kumar Thokar Tamang	31 January 2022	Incumbent	4 years, 286 days
7.	Assistant Spokesperson	Dinesh Kumar Sah	31 January 2022	Incumbent	4 years, 286 days
7.	Assistant Spokesperson	Purna Bahadur Chand	31 January 2022	Incumbent	4 years, 286 days
8.	Assistant General Secretary	Ramananda Neupane	31 January 2022	Incumbent	4 years, 286 days
8.	Assistant General Secretary	Bijay Khadka	31 January 2022	Incumbent	4 years, 286 days
8.	Assistant General Secretary	Prem Balayar	31 January 2022	Incumbent	4 years, 286 days
8.	Assistant General Secretary	Rishiraj Devkota	31 January 2022	Incumbent	4 years, 286 days
8.	Assistant General Secretary	Tahir Ali	31 January 2022	Incumbent	4 years, 286 days
8.	Assistant General Secretary	Deepak Kumar Rai	31 January 2022	Incumbent	4 years, 286 days

=== Provincial Committee Chairs ===
Province	Chairman	Term start	Reference
Koshi Province	Ram Thapa	2021	
Madhesh Province	Bharat Giri	2021	
Bagmati Province	Bikram Thapa	2021	
Gandaki Province	Arjun Khanal	2021	
Lumbini Province	Pradip Kumar Uday	2021	
Karnali Province	Dip Bahadur Shahi	2021	
Sudurpashchim Province	Dharma Raj Joshi	2021	

== Current Members of Parliament ==
=== Pratinidhi Shabha (2026–present) ===
Five Rastriya Prajatantra Party MPs were elected to the House of Representatives at the 2026 election.

No.	MPs	Portrait	Constituency/PR group	Assumed office	End Office	Tenure
1.	Gyan Bahadur Shahi		Jumla 1	27 March 2026		231 days
2.	Khusbu Oli		Khas Arya; Female	27 March 2026		231 days
3.	Saraswati Lama		Janajati; Female	27 March 2026		231 days
4.	Bharat Giri		Khas Arya; Male	27 March 2026		231 days
5.	Tahir Ali Bhat		Muslim; Male	27 March 2026		231 days

== Sister organizations ==
- National Democratic Student Organization
- National Democratic Youth Front
- National Democratic Women's Union

== See also ==
- General Convention of Rastriya Prajatantra Party (2021)
