= Surya Bahadur Thapa =

Five-time Prime Minister of Nepal

- सूर्य बहादुर थापा
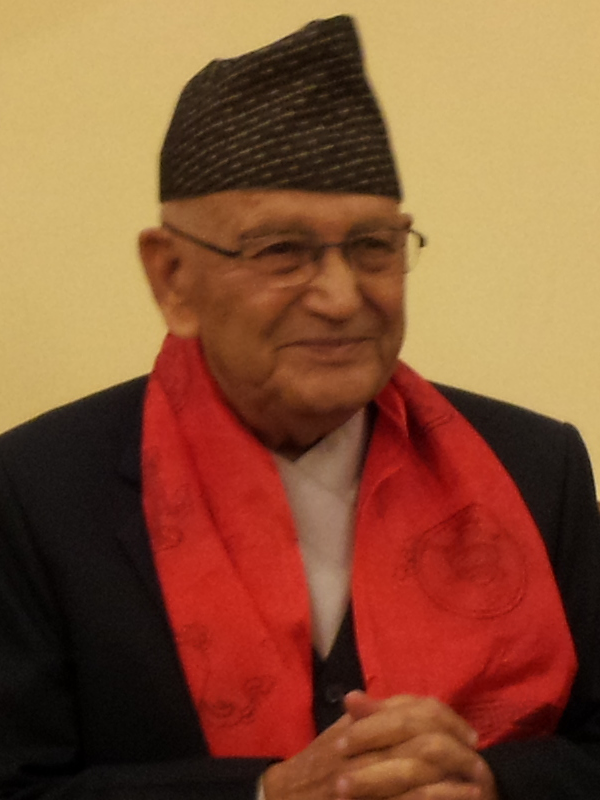
- Thapa in 2014

Prime Minister of Nepal
- In office 5 June 2003 – 4 June 2004
- Monarch: Gyanendra
- Preceded by: Lokendra Bahadur Chand
- Succeeded by: Sher Bahadur Deuba
- In office 7 October 1997 – 15 April 1998
- Monarch: Birendra
- Preceded by: Lokendra Bahadur Chand
- Succeeded by: Girija Prasad Koirala
- In office 30 May 1979 – 12 July 1983
- Monarch: Birendra
- Preceded by: Kirti Nidhi Bista
- Succeeded by: Lokendra Bahadur Chand
- In office 26 January 1965 – 7 April 1969
- Monarch: Mahendra
- Preceded by: Tulsi Giri
- Succeeded by: Kirti Nidhi Bista
- In office 23 December 1963 – 26 February 1964
- Monarch: Mahendra
- Preceded by: Tulsi Giri
- Succeeded by: Tulsi Giri

Member of the Constituent Assembly
- In office 21 January 2014 – 15 April 2015
- Constituency: Party list (Rastriya Prajatantra Party)

Member of the House of Representatives
- In office 28 April 2006 – 16 January 2008
- Preceded by: Himself (2002)
- Succeeded by: Hari Raj Limbu (as Member of the Constituent Assembly)
- Constituency: Dhankuta 2
- In office 14 December 1994 – 22 May 2002
- Preceded by: Gopal Guragain
- Succeeded by: Himself (2006)
- Constituency: Dhankuta 2

Member of the Senate
- In office 30 June 1959 – 15 December 1960

Personal details
- Born: 21 March 1928 Muga village, Dhankuta, Nepal
- Died: 15 April 2015 (aged 87) Delhi, India
- Party: Rastriya Prajatantra Party and Rastriya Janashakti Party
- Education: Ewing Christian College, Allahabad University

Surya Bahadur Thapa (Nepali: सूर्य बहादुर थापा; 21 March 1928 – 15 April 2015) was a Nepali politician and a five-time Prime Minister of Nepal. He served under three different kings in a political career lasting more than 50 years.

Thapa was selected as a member of advisory council in 1958 and was elected as the chairperson. Later he was appointed to the Upper house in 1959 and appointed chair of the Council of Ministers from 1963 to 1964. He went on to serve four terms: 1965–69, 1979–83, 1997–98, and again in 2003 before leaving Rastriya Prajatantra Party (RPP) in November 2004.

Surya Thapa was the first prime minister under the Panchayat System of Nepal. In his later years, he was a leader of RPP. He died on 15 April 2015 from respiratory failure while undergoing surgery.

== Biography ==
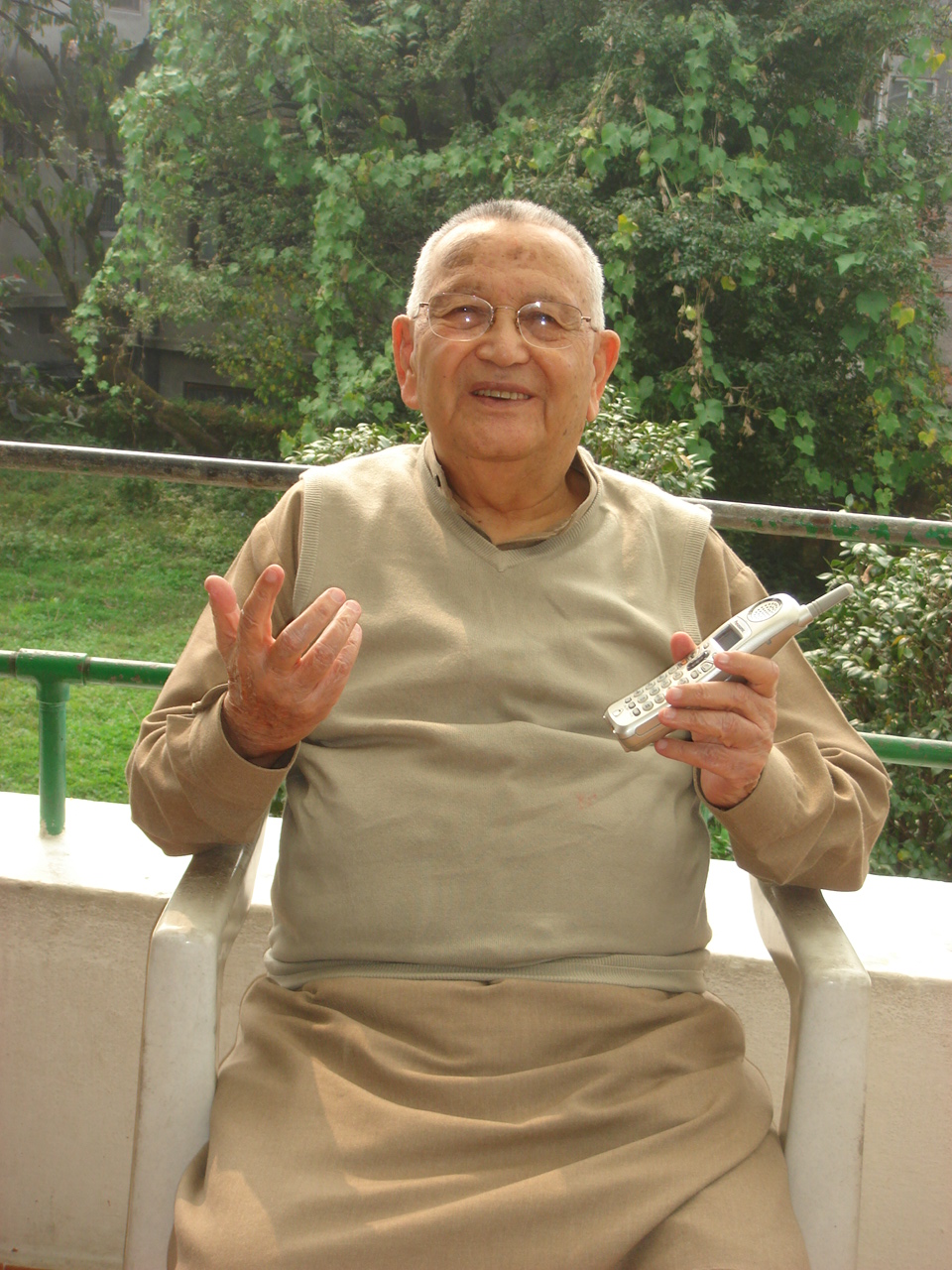
Surya Bahadur Thapa at his residence

Thapa was born on 21 March 1928, in the Dhankuta district. He began his political career in the underground student movement in 1950. In November 1958, he was selected to the national assembly as an independent, and became Chairman of the Advisory Council. In 1959, Thapa was elected to the Upper House. He was appointed Minister of Agriculture, Forest and Industry under the newly formed Panchayat system. Subsequently, he served as Member of National Legislature and Minister of Finance and Economic Affairs.

=== First term ===
Despite not even standing for election in 1963, Thapa was nominated to the National Panchyat by King Mahendra and was appointed chair of the Council of Ministers and Minister of Finance, Law, Justice and General Administration. During this period he was instrumental in abolishing "Land-Birta-System" and set strategies to promote land reform by consolidating tenancy rights of the tenants. Thapa was responsible for "Muluki-Ain", through which he attempted to eradicate the practice of an untouchable caste and promote women's suffrage, among other social activism.

=== Second term ===
In 1966, Thapa was again appointed prime minister under the modified Constitution of Nepal. He was responsible for expanding the coverage of the constitution of 1962, and promulgated its second amendment to make it "people oriented". In 1967, Thapa tendered his resignation, saying that the long tenure of one prime minister was undemocratic in the development of the country.

=== Third term ===
In October 1972, Thapa was arrested and imprisoned in Nakhhu Jail when he demanded political reform in his Itum-Bahal public address. The speech promoted a 13-point resolution, which included democratic changes in the Constitution and restoring rights to the people with democratic elections. He went on a 21-day hunger strike in March 1974, demanding major political reform in the country.

After pro-democracy demonstrations in 1979, Nepali voters chose to uphold the Panchayat system in a referendum in 1980, and King Birendra appointed Thapa Prime Minister on 1 June 1980. The referendum was accompanied by a general amnesty for political prisoners.

Thapa maintained the position through a parliamentary election in 1981. After serving a further two years, he resigned in 1983 when his government lost a no confidence vote.

Between 1983 and 1990, Thapa often spoke on politics, criticizing those who were against democratic reform and urging the strengthening of political and economic development processes in the country. Thapa's statements were quoted in many leading national newspapers. There was an attempt to assassinate one of the editors (Padam Thakurathi) who published Thapa's views. An attempt was made to assassinate Thapa himself while he was traveling through Jhallari, West Nepal.

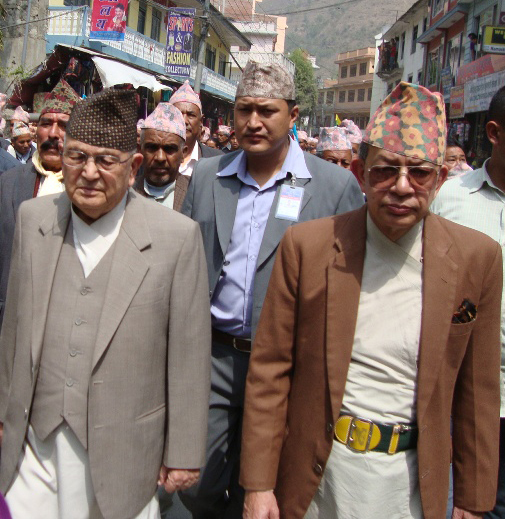
Former Prime Minister Surya Bahadur Thapa (left) with Rastriya Prajatantra Party politician Pashupati Shumsher JBR.

=== Fourth term ===
In 1990, the People's Movement led to the institution of a constitutional democracy system of government with multiple political parties. Thapa started the Rastriya Prajantra Party (RPP) and was elected chairman of the party four years later. The party did not win the 1991 or 1994 elections, but after two successive governments suffered no-confidence motions within a year, King Birendra asked Thapa to form a new coalition government on 7 October 1997. The next February, Thapa's government survived a no-confidence vote, ending the year-long constitutional crisis. Thapa then conceded the prime ministership to his coalition partner, Girija Prasad Koirala of the Nepali Congress.

=== Fifth and final term ===
In 2002, Thapa presided over the Third National Convention of RPP in Pokhara which paved the way for new leadership within the RPP Party. In June 2003, he was appointed Prime Minister of Nepal for the sixth time. During this tenure as prime Minister, he also held the Defense Minister position. Under Thapa, the government offered women special reservations and quotas in government for the first time, via the Public Service Commission. Special quotas were also provided to the under-privileged Dalits and Janajatis for higher education.

Under Thapa's tenure, the government offered the Maoists a 75-point socio-economic and political reform package during peace talks. However, the peace talks failed. To counter the persistent bloody attacks on the police, army, and civilians, Thapa set up the Unified Command. Under the program, the police, army, and armed security functioned as a cohesive team to combat terrorism in the country. Thapa secured arms, military hardware, and aircraft for the army from donor countries (India, USA, and Great Britain) as military aid. When the country was reeling under civil war, he remained adamant that no commissions should be made on arms, unlike his predecessors. All arms procured during this period were under grant aid.

In November 2003, Thapa as the Chairman of the SAARC, urged the Indian Prime Minister Atal Bihari Vajpayee and Pakistani President Zafarullah Khan Jamali to participate in the SAARC Summit in Islamabad. His active participation and persuasion as the SAARC Chairman brought both these nuclear countries to table at the summit. Thapa also became the first Nepali Prime Minister to make an official visit to the Druk Kingdom of Bhutan. Several bilateral agreements were initiated with the SAARC countries during this historic visit.

=== Resignation ===
On 7 May 2004, Thapa resigned after a street protest staged by the five party alliance. In his resignation speech to the nation, he insisted that he would continue to play an active role to forge national consensus. Thapa lead a caretaker government for 25 days as the parties failed to nominate a consensual individual to the post of the prime minister. He officially stepped down on 2 June.

In August 2004, Thapa made his first public statement after his resignation, asking the party leadership to call for a Special General Convention. The Special General Convention was never called, however. Thapa then proposed the Broader National Political Conference amongst all democratic political parties in order to create an alternative democratic force in the country against the new Maoist government.

Rastriya Janshakti Party emerged from a split in the Rastriya Prajatantra Party, as Thapa left RPP on 4 November 2004. On 19 November 2004, Thapa and his followers opened a contact office in Balutwar, Kathmandu, to organise a "broad political conference" and coordinate the construction of a new party. The RJP was founded on 13 March 2005. The political conference was, however, postponed due to the imposition of emergency rule by King Gyanendra on 1 February 2005.

RJP had expressed differences with King Gyanendra after the 1 February 2005, coup on political appointments in the local administrations. RJP accused the King of eliminating the forces working for constitutional monarchy, through his political actions. At the time, RJP tried to profile itself as a centrist party, in between positions advocating direct monarchical rule and republic. During the Loktantra Andolan, the RJP suggested that the King Gyanendra would initiate talks with constitutional forces. When the King was stripped of his political powers by the interim parliament, RJP did not object, and in November 2006, the Prajatantrik Nepal Party led by Keshar Bahadur Bista merged into RJP.

Ahead of the Constituent Assembly election, RJP proposed having a mixed election system, with 75 district representatives and 230 members elected through proportional representation. The party also proposed creating an "Ethnic Assembly" as the upper house of parliament.

== Later years and death ==
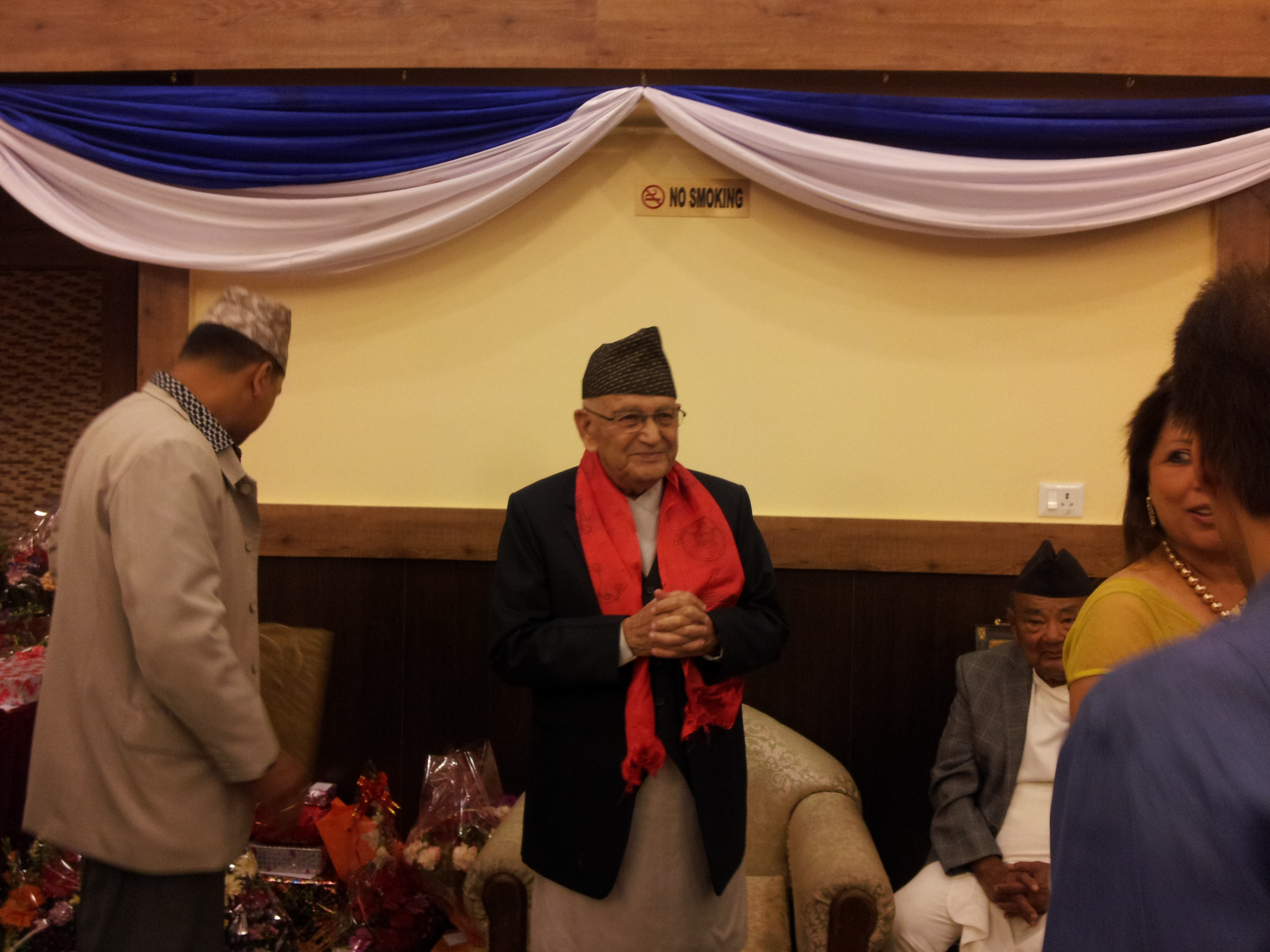
Thapa on his 86th birthday

On 6 February 2008, Thapa initiated unity talks with the leader of RPP, Pashupati Shamsher Jang Bahadur Rana. In a joint press conference, both Thapa and Rana agreed to unite RJP-RPP as one single party. On 6 March, he declared that his party was not monarchist, but would accept the verdict of the voters. RJP MPs had previously boycotted a vote in the interim parliament on making Nepal a republic. Thapa had dubbed the vote "an attack on the fundamental norms of democracy".

Thapa died on 15 April 2015, aged 87 in Delhi, India, from respiratory failure while undergoing surgery. He is survived by three daughters and a son, Sunil Bahadur Thapa, a former minister of commerce and supply.

== Awards ==
=== National ===
- Nepal Shreepada, I Class
- Order of Tri Shakti Patta (Three Divine Powers), Member First Class (Jyotirmaya-Subikhyat-Tri-Shakti-Patta), 1963
- Order of Gorkha Dakshina Bahu (Gurkha Right Hand), Member First Class (Suprasidha-Prabala-Gorkha-Dakshina-Bahu), 1965
- Vishesh Sewa Padak
- Daibi-Prakob Piditoddar Padak, 1968
- Subha-Rajya-Vishek Padak, 1975
- Order of Om Rama Patta 1980
- Birendra-Aishwarya Sewa Padak, 2002

=== International ===
- Order of Merit of the Federal Republic of Germany
- National Order of Merit (France)

Political offices
Preceded by Tulsi Giri	Prime Minister of Nepal; 1963–1964	Succeeded by Tulsi Giri
Preceded by Tulsi Giri	Prime Minister of Nepal; 1965–1969	Succeeded by Kirti Nidhi Bista
Preceded by Kirti Nidhi Bista	Prime Minister of Nepal; 1979–1983	Succeeded by Lokendra Bahadur Chand
Preceded by Lokendra Bahadur Chand	Prime Minister of Nepal; 1997–1998	Succeeded by Girija Prasad Koirala
Preceded by Lokendra Bahadur Chand	Prime Minister of Nepal; 2003–2004	Succeeded by Sher Bahadur Deuba
