= Kamal Thapa =

Nepali politician

- कमल थापा
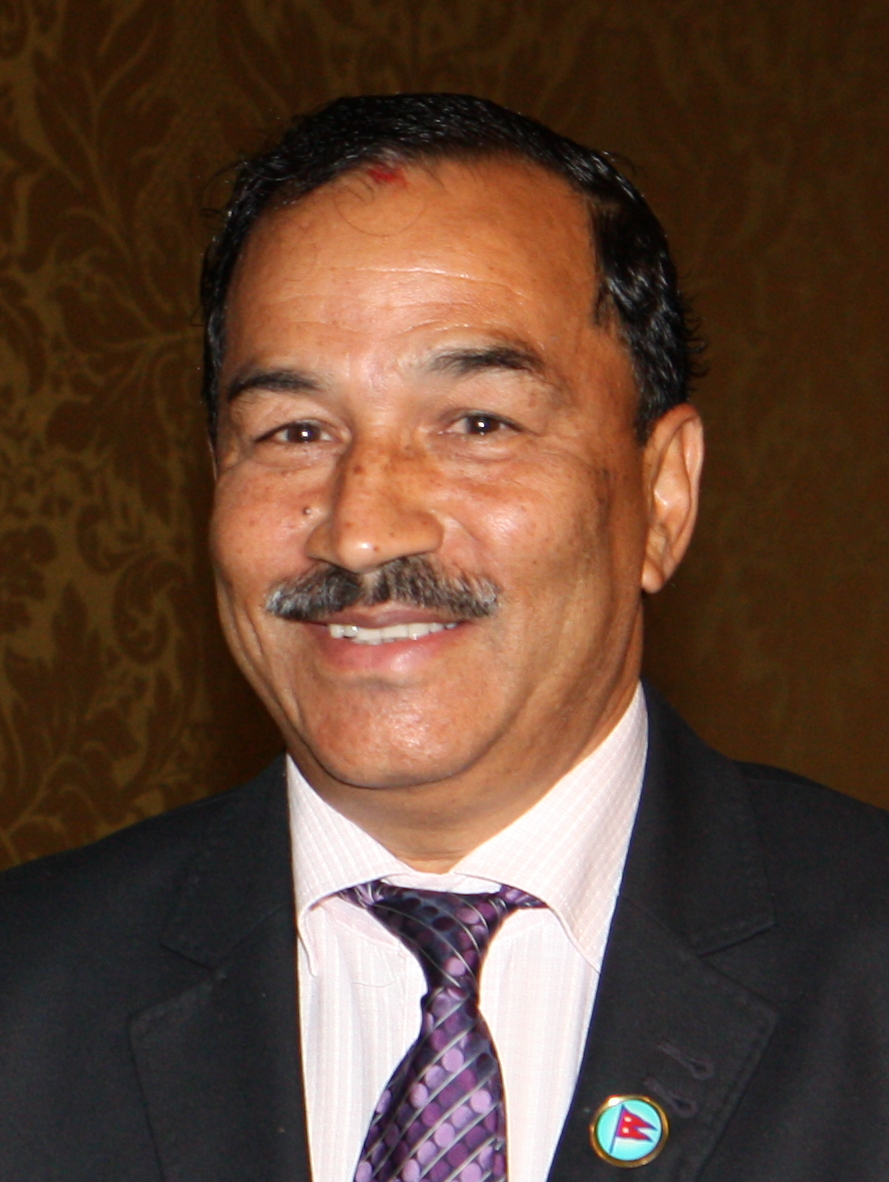

Chairman of Rastriya Prajatantra Party Nepal
- In office February 2022 – 31 December 2025
- Preceded by: Position created

Deputy Prime Minister of Nepal
- In office 7 June 2017 – 15 February 2018
- President: Ram Baran Yadav
- Prime Minister: Sher Bahadur Deuba
- Preceded by: Bimalendra Nidhi
- Succeeded by: Ishwar Pokhrel
- In office 12 October 2015 – 4 August 2016
- President: Ram Baran Yadav
- Prime Minister: KP Sharma Oli
- Preceded by: Prakash Man Singh
- Succeeded by: Bimalendra Nidhi

Minister of Energy
- In office 17 October 2017 – 14 February 2018
- President: Bidya Devi Bhandari
- Prime Minister: Sher Bahadur Deuba
- Preceded by: Mahendra Bahadur Shahi
- Succeeded by: Barsaman Pun

Minister of Foreign Affairs
- In office 12 October 2015 – 4 August 2016
- President: Ram Baran Yadav
- Prime Minister: KP Sharma Oli
- Succeeded by: Prakash Sharan Mahat

Minister of Home Affairs
- In office 3 March 2006 – 10 June 2006
- Monarch: Gyanendra
- Succeeded by: Krishna Prasad Sitaula

Personal details
- Born: 4 August 1955 (age 70) Makwanpur District, Nepal
- Party: Rastriya Prajatantra Party (2026 – present)
- Other political affiliations: RPP-Nepal (2022 – 2025)

Kamal Thapa (Nepali: कमल थापा; born 4 August 1955) is a Nepalese politician belonging to Rastriya Prajatantra Party.

Thapa, has served as a Deputy Prime Minister and Federal Affairs and Local Development. Thapa is also the president of Nepal's Hindu nationalist party, the Rastriya Prajatantra Party Nepal.

== Ideology ==
He served as a Home Minister during King Gyanendra's direct rule in 2006 until the king was forced to hand over power to Girija Prasad Koirala of the Nepali Congress Party and his allies with Communist Party of Nepal (Unified Marxist–Leninist) and Unified Communist Party of Nepal (Maoist). Thapa claimed that no political parties in Nepal have the courage to safeguard Nepali nationality.

He had also challenged the government to re-investigate the royal massacre. RPP-N organised bandh (Close Down) on 22 February 2010 as part of its agitation demanding timely promulgation of constitution.

== Personal life ==
Thapa's younger brother is former President of All Nepal Football Association Ganesh Thapa, who has been involved in the development of football as a professional sport in Nepal.

== Political career ==
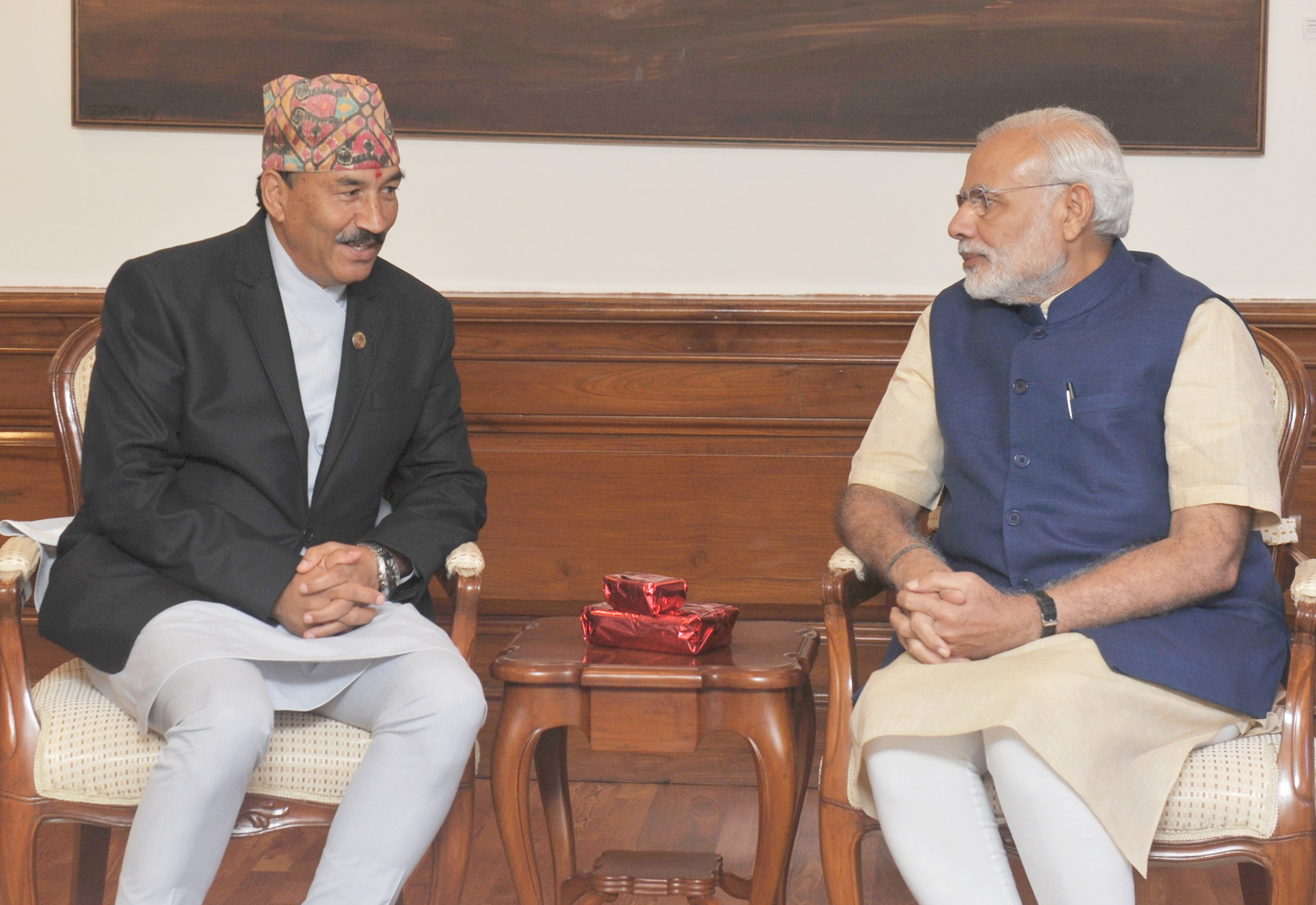
Deputy Prime Minister Shree Kamal Thapa with Indian prime minister, Shri Narendra Modi, in New Delhi on 19 October 2015.

=== Deputy prime minister ===
He held the office of deputy prime minister of Nepal in cabinet of Khadga Prasad Sharma Oli on 12 October 2015.

=== Forming of Rastriya Prajatantra Party-Nepal ===
RPP held its first general convention in 2050 B.S. in Kathmandu, and unanimously elected former prime-minister Surya Bahadur Thapa as chairman. Kamal Thapa became spokesman.

The first-ever special general convention of the party took place in 2062 B.S. in Kathmandu. The special general convention passed a vote of no confidence motion against Pashupati Shamsher Rana and elected Kamal Thapa as chairman of the party. Thapa resigned from his post and Rabindra Nath Sharma became the chairman of the party on 10th Karkik, 2063. Rabindra Nath Sharma resigned from the post of chairman because of his poor health by the second week of Falgun, 2064 and the chairmanship of the party was handed over to Kamal Thapa again.
