= Bishwakarma =

Surname list

Bishwakarma or Vishwakarma is a surname of Hindu origin. The name derives from Vishvakarma, a craftsman deity and architect of the devas.

== Notable people ==
A

- Asha Bishwakarma, Nepali politician

B

- Bimala Bishwakarma, Nepali politician

C

- Chandra Bahadur Bishwakarma, Nepali politician
- Chhabilal Bishwakarma, Nepali politician

D

- Dobate Bishwakarma, Nepali politician

G

- Gopal Krishna Vishwakarma, Indian physician

H

- Harka Maya Bishwakarma, Nepali politician

J

- Jagat Bahadur Sunar Bishwakarma, Nepali politician
- Jagdish Vishwakarma, Indian politician

K

- Kalu Devi Bishwakarma, Nepali politician
- Khadga Bahadur Bishwakarma, Nepali politician
- Kulendra Bishwakarma, Nepali singer

M

- Man Bahadur Bishwakarma, Nepali politician
- Min Bahadur Bishwakarma, Nepali politician
- M. L. Vishwakarma, Indian politician
- Manika Vishwakarma, Indian model

R

- Rahul Vishwakarma, Nepali cricketer
- Ram Vishwakarma, Indian scientist
- Rima Bishwokarma, Nepali actress
- Rupa Bishwakarma, Nepali politician
- Ruplal Bishvakarma, Nepali politician
- Ramlochan Vishwakarma, Indian writer
- Rajkumar Vishwakarma, Indian police officer

S

- Shanti Bishwakarma, Nepali politician
- Singha Bahadur Bishwakarma, Nepali politician
