= Kami (caste) =

Indo-Aryan Nepali-speaking ethnic group

Biswakarma
Regions with significant populations
- Nepal: 1,470,010 (5.04% of Nepal's population) (2021)

Languages
- Tiuni Rudiko (kami Vasa or Sunar Vasa), Nepali language (Khas kura)

Religion
- Hinduism 96.35% (2011), Christianity (3.39%) (2011)

Related ethnic groups
- Khas people, Darjee, Badi, Sarki, Gandarbha/Gaine

Kami is an Indo-Aryan Nepali-speaking group that primarily worked as metalsmiths. Later Nepal abolished its grading system. The tribal designation of Khas is given in some contexts. the Government of Nepal legally abolished the caste-system and criminalized any caste-based discrimination, including "untouchability" (the ostracism of a specific caste) - in the year 1963 A.D.

Caste-based discrimination and violence are a grim reality of Nepali society with numerous people losing their lives due to racially motivated mobs. Both the Government and many other INGO are working hand-in-hand in order to uproot the problem by targeting grassroot issues such as education, awareness and employment.

In the 21st century, the economic status of this group rapidly increased. They live in hilly or mountainous districts of Nepal and in the Indian areas of Assam, Sikkim and Darjeeling District.

== Notable people ==
- Sompal Kami - Nepalese cricketer
- Drona Prakash Rasali - veterinarian
- Prakash Rasaili - Nepali Politician
- Anjana Baraili - Nepalese Actress
- Maheshwar Jung Gahatraj - Nepali politician
- Om Sunar - Nepali playback singer
- Prema Lamgade - Nepalese model
- Asha Bishwakarma - Nepali politician
- Bimala Bishwakarma - Nepali politician
- Chandra Bahadur Bishwakarma - Nepali politician
- Chhabilal Bishwakarma - Nepali politician
- Dobate Bishwakarma - Nepali politician
- Harka Maya Bishwakarma - Nepali politician
- Jagat Bahadur Sunar Bishwakarma - Nepali politician
- Kalu Devi Bishwakarma - Nepali politician
- Khadga Bahadur Bishwakarma - Nepali politician
- Kulendra Bishwakarma - Nepali singer
- Bhuwan Bahadur Sunar - Nepali politician
- Man Bahadur Bishwakarma - Nepali politician
- Min Bahadur Bishwakarma - Nepali politician
- Rahul Vishwakarma - Nepali cricketer
- Rima Bishwokarma - Nepali actress
- Rupa Bishwakarma - Nepali politician
- Ruplal Bishvakarma - Nepali politician
- Shanti Bishwakarma - Nepali politician
- Singha Bahadur Bishwakarma - Nepali politician
- Asha Kumari B.K. - Nepali politician
- Durga Kumari B.K. - youngest female Assembly member elected through the first-past-the post system
- Khamma Bahadur Khati - Former Attorney General of Nepal

== Geographic distribution ==
The 2011 Nepal census classifies the Kami within the broader social group of Hill Dalit. At the time of the Nepal census of 2011, 1,258,554 people (4.8% of the population of Nepal) were Kami. The frequency of Kami by province was as follows:

- Karnali Province (15.9%)
- Gandaki Province (8.8%)
- Sudurpashchim Province (8.3%)
- Lumbini Province (6.0%)
- Koshi Province (3.3%)
- Bagmati Province (2.5%)
- Madhesh Province (0.6%)

The frequency of Kami was higher than national average (4.8%) in the following districts:

- Jajarkot (22.4%)
- Dailekh (18.6%)
- Surkhet (18.5%)
- Kalikot (17.7%)
- Eastern Rukum (17.3%)
- Baglung (16.0%)
- Myagdi (15.4%)
- Western Rukum (15.4%)
- Pyuthan (14.0%)
- Doti (12.3%)
- Rolpa (12.3%)
- Gulmi (12.0%)
- Salyan (11.8%)
- Arghakhanchi (11.3%)
- Dadeldhura (10.6%)
- Bajura (9.8%)
- Humla (9.8%)
- Achham (9.5%)
- Mugu (9.5%)
- Parbat (9.2%)
- Dolpa (9.1%)
- Mustang (8.9%)
- Lamjung (8.7%)
- Kailali (8.4%)
- Kaski (8.0%)
- Syangja (8.0%)
- Tanahun (7.9%)
- Kanchanpur (7.7%)
- Jumla (7.4%)
- Bajhang (7.3%)
- Palpa (6.7%)
- Dang (6.4%)
- Bardiya (5.7%)
- Gorkha (5.6%)
- Solukhumbu (5.6%)
- Nawalpur (5.4%)
- Darchula (5.3%)
- Khotang (5.2%)
- Bhojpur (4.9%)
- Chitwan (4.9%)

== Clans and surnames ==
According to the 2001 Nepal census, 895,954 Kami inhabited the country, among which 96.69% were Hindus and 2.21% were Christians. Kami makes up 4.8% of Nepal's population (or 1,258,554 people) according to the survey of 2011.

Common surnames (Thar-थर) include B.K., Rasaily, Sunar, Diyali, Lohar, Gajmer, Khati, Sirwal, Baraili, Laamgade, Gadal, etc. Their surnames are similar to the Brahmins of Nepal. These surnames are used by Nepali community living in the different parts of India basically in North East States, Sikkim Darjeeling, Tarai and Dooars. In West Bengal these surnames are brought under Scheduled Caste. But in other states like Assam the people of Kami Community are not included in Scheduled Caste.

== Economy ==
The primary occupations include silversmith, ironsmith, goldsmith. Products include idols, weapons, and shields were also produced by these people in the past. Majority of the community were illiterate and had poor economical status in the past. As the democracy established in country many of them are engaged in business activity improving their socio-economic status.

== Bibliography ==
- Whelpton, John (2005). A History of Nepal. Cambridge University Press. ISBN 978-0521804707.
