= 6th House of Representatives (Nepal) =

Parliament of Nepal, 2023–2025

←	5th HoR	7th HoR	→
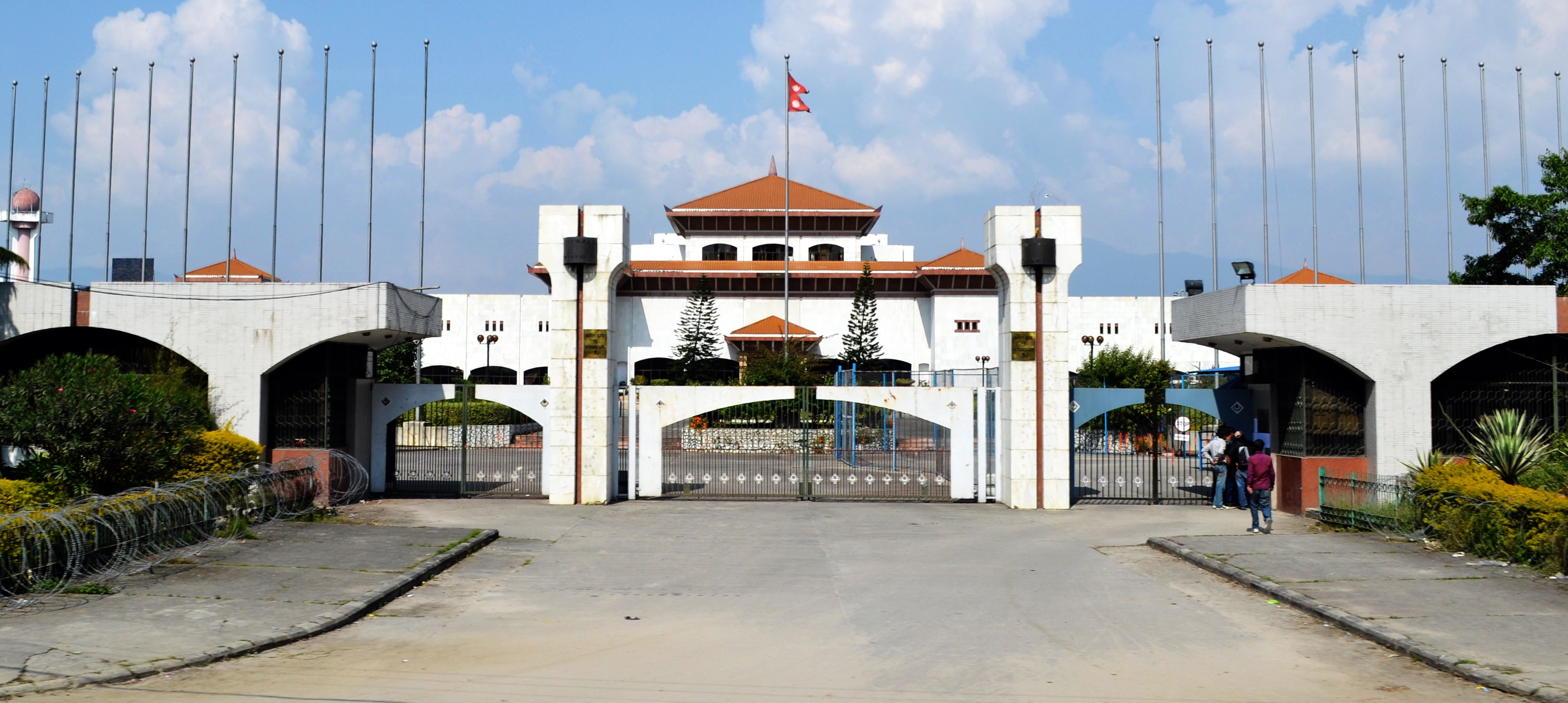
- International Convention Centre, New Baneshwor, Kathmandu

Overview
- Legislative body: Federal Parliament of Nepal
- Term: 9 January 2023 – 12 September 2025
- Election: 2022 general elections
- Government: Dahal cabinet, 2022; Oli cabinet, 2024
- Website: hr.parliament.gov.np

House of Representatives
- Members: 275
- Speaker of the House: Dev Raj Ghimire, UML
- Deputy Speaker: Indira Ranamagar, RSP
- Leader of the House: Pushpa Kamal Dahal, Maoist; K. P. Sharma Oli, UML
- Leader of the Opposition: Sher Bahadur Deuba, Congress; K. P. Sharma Oli, UML; Pushpa Kamal Dahal, Maoist
- Party control: Government (178): Congress (88); CPN (UML) (79); PSP (7); Loktantrik Samajwadi (4); Confidence and supply (29): RPP (14); Janamat (6); PSP-Nepal (5); Nagrik Unmukti (4); Opposition (68): Maoist Centre (32); RSP (21); Unified Socialist (10); Janamorcha (1); AJP (1); NMKP (1); Independent (2)

The 6th House of Representatives, was elected by the 2022 general elections on 20 November 2022. The elections elected 275 Members of Parliament (MPs), 165 for each constituency and 110 through the party list, to the House of Representatives. The parliament convened for the first time on 9 January 2023 and was dissolved on 12 September 2025 following the 2025 Gen Z protests.

== Leaders ==
=== House of Representatives ===
==== Office bearers ====
- Speaker of the House of Representatives: Rt. Hon. Dev Raj Ghimire (CPN (UML))
- Deputy Speaker of the House of Representatives: Hon. Indira Ranamagar (Rastriya Swatantra Party)
- Leader of the House of Representatives (Prime Minister):
  - Rt. Hon. Pushpa Kamal Dahal (CPN (Maoist Centre)) (until 13 July 2024)
  - Rt. Hon. K. P. Sharma Oli (CPN (UML)) (until 9 September 2025)
- Leader of the Opposition:
  - Hon. Sher Bahadur Deuba (Nepali Congress) (26 December 2022 – 27 February 2023; 4 March 2024 – 13 July 2024)
  - Hon. K. P. Sharma Oli (CPN (UML)) (28 February 2023 – 3 March 2024)
  - Hon. Pushpa Kamal Dahal (CPN (Maoist Centre)) (from 14 July 2024)

==== Parliamentary party leaders ====
- Parliamentary party leader of Nepali Congress: Hon. Sher Bahadur Deuba
- Parliamentary party leader of CPN (UML): Hon. K. P. Sharma Oli
  - Deputy parliamentary party leader of CPN (UML): Hon. Subas Chandra Nemwang (until 12 September 2023)
- Parliamentary party leader of CPN (Maoist Centre): Hon. Pushpa Kamal Dahal
- Parliamentary party leader of Rastriya Swatantra Party:
  - Hon. Rabi Lamichhane (until 27 January 2023; since 1 May 2023)
  - Hon. Dol Prasad Aryal (28 January 2023 – 1 May 2023)
  - Deputy Parliamentary party leader of Rastriya Swatantra Party: Hon. Biraj Bhakta Shrestha
- Parliamentary party leader of Rastriya Prajatantra Party: Hon. Rajendra Lingden
- Parliamentary party leader of People's Socialist Party, Nepal:
  - Hon. Ram Sahaya Yadav (until 17 March 2023)
  - Hon. Upendra Yadav (since 22 May 2023)
- Parliamentary party leader of CPN (Unified Socialist): Hon. Madhav Kumar Nepal
  - Deputy parliamentary party leader of CPN (Unified Socialist): Hon. Rajendra Pandey
- Parliamentary party leader of Janamat Party: Hon. Chandra Kant Raut
  - Deputy parliamentary party leader of Janamat Party: Hon. Abdul Khan
- Parliamentary party leader of Nagrik Unmukti Party:
  - Hon. Ranjeeta Shrestha (until 1 June 2024)
  - Hon. Ganga Ram Chaudhary (since 1 June 2024)
- Parliamentary party leader of Loktantrik Samajwadi Party: Hon. Mahantha Thakur

==== Whips ====
- Chief Whip of Nepali Congress:
  - Hon. Ramesh Lekhak (until 15 July 2024)
  - Hon. Shyam Kumar Ghimire (since 20 July 2024)
  - Whip of Nepali Congress: Hon. Sushila Thing
- Chief Whip of CPN (UML): Hon. Padam Giri
  - Whip of CPN (UML): Hon. Mahesh Bartaula
- Chief Whip of CPN (Maoist Centre): Hon. Hit Raj Pandey
- Chief Whip of Rastriya Swatantra Party: Hon. Santosh Pariyar
  - Whip of Rastriya Swatantra Party: Hon. Nisha Dangi
- Chief Whip of Rastriya Prajatantra Party: Hon. Gyanendra Shahi
- Chief Whip of People's Socialist Party, Nepal: Hon. Pradeep Yadav
- Chief Whip of CPN (Unified Socialist):
  - Hon. Prakash Jwala (until 3 April 2023)
  - Hon. Metmani Chaudhary (since 3 April 2023)
- Chief Whip of Janamat Party: Hon. Anita Devi Sah
  - Whip of Janamat Party: Hon. Goma Labh
- Chief Whip of Nagrik Unmukti Party:
  - Hon. Ganga Ram Chaudhary (until 1 June 2024)
  - Hon. Lalbir Chaudhary (since 1 June 2024)
    - Whip of Nagrik Unmukti Party: Hon. Arun Kumar Chaudhary

== Members of the House of Representatives ==
6th House of Representatives

On 5 May 2024, after PSP split from PSP-N

On 27 January 2023, after vacation of Rastriya Swatantra Party MP Rabi Lamichhane's seat

On 2 January 2023, after Independent MP Kiran Kumar Sah joined CPN (UML)

After the 2022 general election

Party	Total seats					
Party	After election			At present		
Party	FPTP	PR	Total	FPTP	PR	Total
Parliamentary parties
Nepali Congress	57	32	89	59	32	88
CPN (UML)	44	34	78	45	34	79
CPN (Maoist Centre)	18	14	32	18	14	32
Rastriya Swatantra Party	7	13	20	8 (Note: Including 1 suspended members)	13	21
Rastriya Prajatantra Party	7	7	14	6	7	13
People's Socialist Party (Note: Contested election as members of PSP-N before party split)	—	—	—	4	3	7
People's Socialist Party, Nepal	7	5	12	3	2	5
Janamat Party	1	5	6	1	5	6
Represented as Independents
CPN (Unified Socialist)	10	0	10	10	0	10
Loktantrik Samajwadi Party, Nepal	4	0	4	4	0	4
Nagrik Unmukti Party	3	0	3	4	0	4
Rastriya Janamorcha	1	0	1	1	0	1
Nepal Workers Peasants Party	1	0	1	1	0	1
Aam Janata Party	0	0	0	1	0	1
Independent	5	—	5	2	—	2
Vacant	—	—	—	1	0	1
Total	165	110	275	165	110	275

=== Members ===
Nepali Congress (88)
Constituency/PR group	Member	Portfolio & Responsibilities / Remarks
Dadeldhura 1	Sher Bahadur Deuba	Parliamentary party leader; Leader of the Opposition (26 December 2022 – 27 February 2023; 4 March 2024 – 13 July 2024)
Sindhuli 1	Shyam Kumar Ghimire	Chief Whips (from 20 July 2024)
Kathmandu 1	Prakash Man Singh	Deputy Prime Minister and Minister of Urban Development (from 15 July 2024)
Surkhet 1	Purna Bahadur Khadka	Deputy Prime Minister and Minister of Defence (until 4 March 2024)
Kanchanpur 3	Ramesh Lekhak	Chief whip (until 15 July 2024); Minister of Home Affairs (from 15 July 2024)
Khas Arya	Arzu Rana Deuba	Minister of Foreign Affairs (from 15 July 2024)
Saptari 4	Teju Lal Chaudhary	
Bajura 1	Badri Prasad Pandey	
Parsa 2	Ajay Kumar Chaurasiya	
Kathmandu 5	Pradip Paudel	
Dhading 2	Ram Nath Adhikari	
Sankhuwasabha 1	Deepak Khadka	
Mugu 1	Aain Bahadur Shahi Thakuri	
Syangja 2	Dhanraj Gurung	
Khas Arya	Prakash Sharan Mahat	Minister of Finance (until 4 March 2024)
Kanchanpur 2	Narayan Prakash Saud	Minister of Foreign Affairs (until 4 March 2024)
Sindhupalchok 2	Mohan Bahadur Basnet	
Parsa 4	Ramesh Rijal	Minister of Industry, Commerce and Supplies (until 4 March 2024)
Tehrathum 1	Sita Gurung	Minister of Urban Development (until 4 March 2024)
Morang 1	Dig Bahadur Limbu	
Kapilvastu 2	Surendra Raj Acharya	
Dalit	Rupa Bishwakarma	Minister of State
Ramechhap 1	Purna Bahadur Tamang	Minister of State
Achham 2	Pushpa Bahadur Shah	
Banke 3	Kishore Singh Rathore	
Bardiya 1	Sanjay Kumar Gautam	
Bhaktapur 2	Durlabh Thapa Chhetri	
Dailekh 2	Dikpal Kumar Shahi	
Dang 3	Deepak Giri	
Darchula 1	Dilendra Prasad Badu	
Dhanusha 2	Ram Krishna Yadav	
Gorkha 1	Rajendra Bajgain	
Gulmi 1	Chandra Kant Bhandari	
Jhapa 1	Bishwa Prakash Sharma	
Kailali 4	Bir Bahadur Balayar	
Kailali 5	Dilli Raj Pant	
Kathmandu 3	Santosh Chalise	
Kathmandu 4	Gagan Thapa	
Kathmandu 10	Rajendra Kumar K.C.	
Lalitpur 1	Udaya Shamsher Rana	
Mahottari 4	Mahendra Kumar Ray	
Manang 1	Tek Bahadur Gurung	Suspended since 27 December 2022
Morang 3	Sunil Kumar Sharma	
Morang 6	Shekhar Koirala	
Mustang 1	Yogesh Gauchan Thakali	
Myagdi 1	Kham Bahadur Garbuja	
Nawalpur 1	Shashanka Koirala	
Nawalpur 2	Bishnu Kumar Karki	
Nuwakot 2	Arjun Narsingh K.C.	
Okhaldhunga 1	Ram Hari Khatiwada	
Parasi 1	Binod Chaudhary	
Rasuwa 1	Mohan Acharya	
Rautahat 4	Dev Prasad Timilsena	
Saptari 3	Dinesh Kumar Yadav	
Sunsari 4	Gyanendra Bahadur Karki	
Surkhet 2	Hridaya Ram Thani	
Syangja 1	Raju Thapa	
Tanahun 2	Shankar Bhandari	
Khas Arya	Ambika Basnet	
Khas Arya	Sarita Prasain	
Khas Arya	Ishwari Neupane	
Khas Arya	Pratima Gautam	
Khas Arya	Manju Khand	
Khas Arya	Rama Koirala Paudel	
Khas Arya, Backward area	Kantika Sejuwal	
Khas Arya, Backward area	Maina Karki	
Indigenous peoples	Saraswati Bajiyam	
Indigenous peoples	Liladevi Bokhim Limbu	
Indigenous peoples	Sita Kumari Rana	
Indigenous peoples	Sushila Thing	Whip
Indigenous peoples	Sapana Rajbhandari	
Indigenous peoples	Maya Rai	
Indigenous peoples	Kusum Devi Thapa	
Indigenous peoples	Manorama Sherchan	
Indigenous peoples	Anjani Shrestha	
Madheshi	Nagina Yadav	
Madheshi	Mukta Kumari Yadav	
Madheshi	Chanda Chaudhary	
Madheshi	Sangita Mandal Dhanuk	
Madheshi	Bimalendra Nidhi	
Dalit	Shanti Bishwakarma	
Dalit	Sita Mijar	
Dalit	Asha Bishwakarma	
Dalit	Jiwan Pariyar	
Tharu	Kalpana Chaudhary	
Tharu	Bina Kumari Thanet	
Muslim	Jaweda Khatun Jaga	
Former Members
Tanahun 1	Ram Chandra Paudel	Elected to President (on 9 March 2023)

CPN (UML) (79)
Constituency/PR group	Member	Portfolio & Responsibilities / Remarks
Officers of the House of Representatives
Jhapa 2	Dev Raj Ghimire	Speaker of the House of Representatives
Members of Parliament
Jhapa 5	K. P. Sharma Oli	Parliamentary party leader; Leader of the Opposition (28 February 2023 – 3 March 2024); Prime Minister (from 15 July 2024)
Parbat 1	Padam Giri	Chief whip
Makwanpur 2	Mahesh Kumar Bartaula	Whip
Rupandehi 2	Bishnu Prasad Paudel	
Arghakhanchi 1	Top Bahadur Rayamajhi	Suspended since 15 May 2023
Bara 3	Jwala Kumari Sah	
Baitadi 1	Damodar Bhandari	
Dhankuta 1	Rajendra Kumar Rai	
Sunsari 3	Bhagwati Chaudhary	
Sarlahi 3	Hari Prasad Upreti	
Banke 1	Surya Prasad Dhakal	
Bara 1	Achyut Prasad Mainali	
Dhanusha 3	Julie Kumari Mahato	
Dhanusha 4	Raghubir Mahaseth	
Gulmi 2	Gokarna Raj Bista	
Ilam 1	Mahesh Basnet	
Ilam 2	Suhang Nembang	
Jhapa 4	Lal Prasad Sawa Limbu	
Kanchanpur 1	Tara Lama Tamang	
Kapilvastu 1	Balaram Adhikari	
Kapilvastu 3	Mangal Prasad Gupta	
Kaski 1	Man Bahadur Gurung	
Kaski 2	Bidya Bhattarai	
Kaski 3	Damodar Poudel Bairagi	
Kathmandu 9	Krishna Gopal Shrestha	
Kavrepalanchok 2	Gokul Prasad Baskota	
Lalitpur 2	Prem Bahadur Maharjan	
Lamjung 1	Prithivi Subba Gurung	
Mahottari 1	Laxmi Mahato Koiri	Suspended from 2 May 2023 until 24 December 2023
Morang 2	Rishikesh Pokharel	
Palpa 1	Narayan Prasad Acharya	
Palpa 2	Thakur Prasad Gaire	
Panchthar 1	Basanta Kumar Nemwang	
Parsa 3	Raj Kumar Gupta	
Pyuthan 1	Surya Bahadur Thapa Chhetri	
Rautahat 2	Kiran Kumar Sah	Elected as Independent
Rupandehi 1	Chhabilal Bishwakarma	
Rupandehi 5	Basudev Ghimire	
Siraha 1	Ram Shankar Yadav	
Siraha 3	Lila Nath Shrestha	
Solukhumbu 1	Manbir Rai	
Sunsari 2	Bhim Prasad Acharya	
Taplejung 1	Yogesh Bhattrai	
Udayapur 2	Ambar Bahadur Rayamajhi	
Khas Arya	Raghuji Pant	
Khas Arya	Eknath Dhakal	
Khas Arya, Backward area	Dayal Bahadur Shahi	
Khas Arya	Menuka Kumari Pokharel	
Khas Arya	Sarita Bhusal	
Khas Arya	Shobha Gyawali	
Khas Arya	Bijula Rayamajhi	
Khas Arya	Nirmala Koirala	
Khas Arya	Samjhana Thapaliya	
Khas Arya	Deepa Sharma	
Khas Arya	Sunita Baral	
Indigenous peoples	Devi Prakash Bhattachan	
Indigenous peoples	Hemraj Rai	
Indigenous peoples	Kaluram Rai	
Indigenous peoples	Nainkala Thapa Magar	
Indigenous peoples	Surya Kumari Shrestha	
Indigenous peoples	Urmila Thebe	
Indigenous peoples	Ishwari Gharti	
Indigenous peoples	Rana Kumari Balampaki Magar	
Indigenous peoples	Shanti Shrestha	
Indigenous peoples	Saraswati Subba	
Tharu	Aasma Kumari Chaudhary	
Tharu	Shanti Chaudhary	
Dalit	Ishwar Bahadur Rijal	
Dalit	Prabhu Hajara Dusadh	
Dalit	Chandra Bahadur Bishwakarma	
Dalit	Rukmini Rana Baraili	
Dalit	Harka Maya Bishwakarma	
Madheshi	Ganga Prasad Yadav	
Madheshi	Amrit Lal Rajbanshi	
Madheshi	Bina Devi	
Madheshi	Amrita Agrahari	
Madheshi	Pratikshya Tiwari Mukhiya	
Muslim	Saraj Ahmed Farooqui	
Former Members
Ilam 2	Subas Chandra Nemwang	Deputy parliamentary party leader (until 12 September 2023); Died on 12 September 2023

CPN (Maoist Centre) (32)
Constituency/PR group	Member	Portfolio & Responsibilities / Remarks
Gorkha 2	Pushpa Kamal Dahal	Parliamentary party leader; Prime Minister (until 15 July 2024); Leader of the Opposition (from 15 July 2024)
Dang 2	Rekha Sharma	Minister for Information and Communications Technology
Bhojpur 1	Sudan Kirati	Minister for Culture, Tourism and Civil Aviation
Morang 4	Aman Lal Modi	Minister for Federal Affairs and General Administration
Dalit	Sushila Sirpali Thakuri	State minister for ministry of Culture, Tourism and Civil Aviation
Baglung 2	Devendra Paudel	
Dolakha 1	Ganga Karki	
Humla 1	Tsering Damdul Lama	
Jajarkot 1	Shakti Bahadur Basnet	
Kalikot 1	Mahendra Bahadur Shahi	
Kavrepalanchok 1	Surya Man Dong	
Khotang 1	Ram Kumar Rai	
Nuwakot 1	Hit Bahadur Tamang	
Rolpa 1	Barsaman Pun	
Rukum East 1	Purna Bahadur Gharti Mangar	
Rukum West 1	Janardan Sharma	
Sarlahi 2	Mahindra Rai Yadav	Elected as member of Nepal Socialist Party
Sindhuli 2	Lekh Nath Dahal	
Sindhupalchok 1	Madhav Sapkota	
Khas Arya	Hit Raj Pandey	Chief whip
Khas Arya	Bimala Subedi	
Khas Arya	Gyanu Basnet	
Khas Arya	Narayani Sharma	
Indigenous peoples	Durga Rai	
Indigenous peoples	Mina Tamang	
Indigenous peoples	Urmila Majhi	
Indigenous peoples, Backward area	Tsering Lhamu Lama	
Madheshi	Mina Yadav	
Madheshi	Umrawati Devi Yadav	Elected as member of Nepal Socialist Party
Dalit	Ranendra Baraili	
Tharu	Rupa So.Si. Chaudhari	
Muslim	Kalpana Miya Kusari	

Rastriya Swatantra Party (21)
Constituency/PR group	Member	Portfolio & Responsibilities / Remarks
Officers of the House of Representatives
Indigenous peoples	Indira Ranamagar	Deputy Speaker of the House of Representatives
Members of Parliament
Chitwan 2	Rabi Lamichhane	22 December 2022 – 27 January 2023; 25 April 2023–present); Deputy prime minister and minister for Home Affairs (until 27 January 2023); Parliamentary party leader (until 27 January 2023; since 1 May 2023)
Khas Arya	Dol Prasad Aryal	Parliamentary party leader (28 January 2023 – 1 May 2023); Minister for Labour, Employment and Social Security (until 5 February 2023)
Kathmandu 8	Biraj Bhakta Shrestha	Deputy parliamentary party leader
Dalit	Santosh Pariyar	Chief whip
Khas Arya	Nisha Dangi	Whip
Kathmandu 6	Shishir Khanal	Minister for Education, Science and Technology (until 5 February 2023)
Lalitpur 3	Toshima Karki	State minister for ministry of Health and Population (until 5 February 2023)
Chitwan 1	Hari Dhakal	
Kathmandu 2	Sobita Gautam	
Kathmandu 7	Ganesh Parajuli	
Tanahun 1	Swarnim Wagle	Elected from by election (on 25 April 2023)
Khas Arya	Chanda Karki	
Khas Arya, Backward area	Binita Kathayat	
Indigenous peoples	Bindabasini Kansakar	Since 29 May 2023
Indigenous peoples	Sumana Shrestha	
Madheshi	Laxmi Tiwari	
Madheshi	Manish Jha	
Dalit	Shiva Nepali	
Tharu	Ashok Kumar Chaudhary	
Muslim	Asim Shah	
Former members
Indigenous peoples	Dhaka Kumar Shrestha	Until 25 April 2023

Rastriya Prajatantra Party (14)
Constituency/PR group	Member	Portfolio & Responsibilities / Remarks
Jhapa 3	Rajendra Prasad Lingden	Deputy prime minister and minister for Energy, Water Resources and Irrigation (until 25 February 2023); Parliamentary party leader
Chitwan 3	Bikram Pandey	Minister for Urban Development (until 25 February 2023)
Parasi 2	Dhruba Bahadur Pradhan	Minister for Law, Justice and Parliamentary Affairs (until 25 February 2023)
Makwanpur 1	Deepak Bahadur Singh	State minister for ministry of Energy, Water Resources and Irrigation (until 25 February 2023)
Jumla 1	Gyan Bahadur Shahi	Chief whip
Banke 2	Dhawal Shamsher Rana	
Khas Arya	Pashupati Shamsher Rana	
Khas Arya	Rosan Karki	
Khas Arya	Gita Basnet	
Indigenous peoples	Budhhiman Tamang	
Indigenous peoples	Bina Lama	
Madheshi	Bina Jaiswal	
Dalit	Anisha Nepali	
Former members
Rupandehi 3	Deepak Bohara	Died on 1 April 2025

CPN (Unified Socialist) (10)
Constituency/PR group	Member	Portfolio & Responsibilities / Remarks
Rautahat 1	Madhav Kumar Nepal	Parliamentary party leader
Dhading 1	Rajendra Prasad Pandey	Deputy parliamentary party leader
Salyan 1	Prakash Jwala	Chief whip; Minister for Physical Infrastructure and Transport (From 31 March 2023)
Achham 1	Sher Bahadur Kunwor	
Bajhang 1	Bhanu Bhakta Joshi	
Bara 4	Krishna Kumar Shrestha	
Dailekh 1	Amar Bahadur Thapa	
Dang 1	Metmani Chaudhary	
Dolpa 1	Dhan Bahadur Buda	
Doti 1	Prem Bahadur Ale	

People's Socialist Party (7)
Constituency/PR group	Member	Portfolio & Responsibilities / Remarks
Sunsari 1	Ashok Rai	Parliamentary party leader
Parsa 1	Pradeep Yadav	Chief whip
Saptari 1	Nawal Kishore Sah Sudi	
Siraha 4	Birendra Prasad Mahato	
Indigenous peoples	Sushila Shrestha	
Madheshi	Ranju Kumari Jha	
Muslim	Hasina Khan	

Janamat Party (6)
Constituency/PR group	Member	Portfolio & Responsibilities / Remarks
Saptari 2	Chandra Kant Raut	Parliamentary party leader
Muslim	Abdul Khan	Minister for Water Supply (until 31 March 2023); Deputy parliamentary party leader
Madheshi	Anita Devi Sah	Chief whip
Khas Arya	Goma Labh	Whip
Indigenous peoples	Binita Kumari Singh	
Indigenous peoples	Sonu Murmu	

People's Socialist Party, Nepal (5)
Constituency/PR group	Member	Portfolio & Responsibilities / Remarks
Bara 2	Upendra Yadav	Parliamentary party leader (since 22 May 2023); Elected from by election (on 25 April 2023)
Dhanusha 1	Dipak Karki	
Siraha 2	Raj Kishor Yadav	
Khas Arya	Prakash Adhikari	
Khas Arya	Rekha Yadav Thapa	
Former Members
Muslim	Shahnaz Rahman	Died on 25 February 2023
Muslim	Manju Ansari	Died on 17 March 2024
Bara 2	Ram Sahaya Yadav	Parliamentary party leader (until 17 March 2023); Elected to Vice-President (on 17 March 2023)

Loktantrik Samajwadi Party (4)
Constituency/PR group	Member	Portfolio & Responsibilities / Remarks
Mahottari 3	Mahantha Thakur	Parliamentary party leader
Mahottari 2	Sharat Singh Bhandari	Minister for Labour, Employment and Social Security (From 31 March 2023)
Rupandehi 4	Sarbendra Nath Shukla	
Sarlahi 1	Ram Prakash Chaudhary	

Nagrik Unmukti Party (4)
Constituency/PR group	Member	Portfolio & Responsibilities / Remarks
Kailali 1	Ranjeeta Shrestha	Parliamentary party leader; Minister for Land Management, Cooperatives and Poverty Alleviation (From 31 March 2023)
Kailali 3	Ganga Ram Chaudhary	Chief whip
Kailali 2	Arun Kumar Chaudhary	Whip; Suspended from 3 February 2023 to 22 February 2023
Bardiya 2	Lalbir Chaudhary	Elected as Independent

Nepal Majdoor Kisan Party (1)
Constituency/PR group	Member	Portfolio & Responsibilities / Remarks
Bhaktapur 1	Prem Suwal	

Rastriya Janamorcha (1)
Constituency/PR group	Member	Portfolio & Responsibilities / Remarks
Baglung 1	Chitra Bahadur K.C.	

Aam Janata Party (1)
Constituency/PR group	Member	Portfolio & Responsibilities / Remarks
Rautahat 3	Prabhu Sah	Elected as Independent

Independent (2)
Constituency/PR group	Member	Portfolio & Responsibilities / Remarks
Morang 5	Yogendra Mandal	
Sarlahi 4	Amresh Kumar Singh	

=== Suspensions ===
Name	Constituency/PR group	Party	From	To	Reason
Tek Bahadur Gurung	Manang 1	Congress	27 December 2022	24 April 2024	Convicted on corruption charges
Arun Kumar Chaudhary	Kailali 2	Nagrik Unmukti	3 February 2023	22 February 2023	Sentenced to jail for arson
Laxmi Mahato Koiri	Mahottari 1	CPN (UML)	2 May 2023	24 December 2023	Absconding following murder charge
Top Bahadur Rayamajhi	Arghakhanchi 1	CPN (UML)	15 May 2023		Arrested in connection to Bhutanese refugee scam
Chitwan 2	Rabi Lamichhane	RSP	24 December 2024		Charges filed in cooperative fraud case

=== Defections ===
Name	Constituency/PR group	Date	From	To
Lalbir Chaudhary	Bardiya 2	23 December 2022	Independent	Nagrik Unmukti
Prabhu Sah	Rautahat 3	29 December 2022	Independent	AJP
Kiran Kumar Sah	Rautahat 2	2 January 2023	Independent	CPN (UML)
Ashok Rai	Sunsari 1	6 May 2024	PSP-Nepal	PSP
Pradeep Yadav	Parsa 1	6 May 2024	PSP-Nepal	PSP
Nawal Kishore Sah Sudi	Saptari 1	6 May 2024	PSP-Nepal	PSP
Birendra Prasad Mahato	Siraha 4	6 May 2024	PSP-Nepal	PSP
Sushila Shrestha	Indigenous peoples	6 May 2024	PSP-Nepal	PSP
Ranju Kumari Jha	Madheshi	6 May 2024	PSP-Nepal	PSP
Hasina Khan	Muslim	6 May 2024	PSP-Nepal	PSP

=== Changes ===
Constituency/PR group	Incumbent				Replacement			
Constituency/PR group	Name	Party	Date vacated	Reason	Name	Party	Date elected	Change
Chitwan 2	Rabi Lamichhane	RSP	27 January 2023	Citizenship declared invalid by Supreme Court	Rabi Lamichhane	RSP	25 April 2023	By-election
Muslim	Shahnaz Rahman	PSP-Nepal	25 February 2023	Death	Manju Ansari	PSP-Nepal	16 March 2023	List
Tanahun 1	Ram Chandra Paudel	Congress	9 March 2023	Elected President	Swarnim Wagle	RSP	25 April 2023	By-election
Bara 2	Ram Sahaya Yadav	PSP-Nepal	17 March 2023	Elected Vice President	Upendra Yadav	PSP-Nepal	25 April 2023	By-election
Indigenous peoples	Dhaka Kumar Shrestha	RSP	25 April 2023	Expelled by party following corruption accusation	Bindabasini Kansakar	RSP	29 May 2023	List
Muslim	Manju Ansari	PSP-Nepal	17 March 2024	Death	Hasina Khan	PSP-Nepal	19 April 2024	List
Ilam 2	Subas Chandra Nembang	CPN (UML)	12 September 2023	Death	Suhang Nembang	CPN (UML)	27 April 2024	By-election
Rupandehi 3	Deepak Bohara	RPP	1 April 2025	Death				

== Parliamentary committees ==
Committee	Chairperson
House of Representative Committees
Finance Committee	Santosh Chalise (Congress)
International Relations and Tourism Committee	Raj Kishor Yadav (PSPN)
Industry, Commerce, Labour and Consumer Welfare Committee	Abdul Khan (Janamat)
Law, Justice and Human Rights Committee	Bimala Subedi (Maoist Centre)
Agriculture, Cooperatives and Natural Resources Committee	Arzu Rana Deuba (Congress)
Women and Social Affairs Committee	Kiran Kumar Sah (UML)
State Affairs and Good Governance Committee	Ramhari Khatiwada (Congress)
Infrastructure Development Committee	Deepak Bahadur Singh (RPP)
Education, Health and Information Technology Committee	Amar Bahadur Thapa (Unified Socialist)
Public Accounts Committee	Rishikesh Pokharel (UML)
National Assembly Committees
Development, Economic Affairs and Good Governance Committee	Kamala Devi Panta (Congress)
Legislative Management Committee	Jayanti Rai (Unified Socialist)
Public Policy and Delegated Legislation Committee	Maya Prasad Sharma (Maoist Centre)
Federalism Enablement and National Concerns Committee	Sonam Galjen Sherpa (UML)
Federalism Implementation Study and Monitoring Special Parliamentary Committee	Khim Lal Devkota (Independent)
Joint Committees
Parliamentary Hearing Committee	
State Direction Committee	
