= Fourth Oli cabinet =

Government of Nepal from 2024 to 2025

- Council of Ministers of Nepal

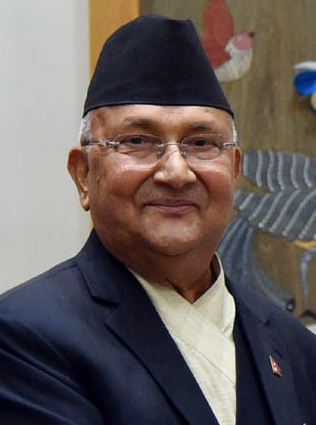
- Date formed: 15 July 2024
- Date dissolved: 12 September 2025 (Note: Oli resigned in 9 September and still served as 'caretaker' Prime Minister until 12 September.)

People and organisations
- President: Ram Chandra Paudel
- Prime Minister: KP Sharma Oli
- Deputy Prime Minister: Prakash Man Singh; Bishnu Prasad Paudel
- Member parties: Congress; CPN (UML); PSP; Loktantrik Samajwadi; Nagrik Unmukti
- Status in legislature: Majority coalition government
- Opposition party: CPN (Maoist Centre)
- Opposition leader: Pushpa Kamal Dahal

History
- Outgoing formation: 2025 Protests
- Election: 2022 general election
- Legislature term: 2nd Federal Parliament
- Predecessor: Third Dahal cabinet
- Successor: Karki interim cabinet

The Fourth Oli Cabinet was the Government of Nepal from 15 July 2024 to 9 September 2025 when Oli resigned after mass protests erupted against his government. Oli was appointed prime minister as per Article 76(2) of the constitution, following the ouster of the government of Pushpa Kamal Dahal after a failed vote of confidence in the parliament on 12 July.

== Final arrangement ==
S.N.	Portfolio	Minister	Political party	Assumed office	Left office	Ref.
Prime Minister
1.	Prime Minister of Nepal	KP Sharma Oli	CPN (UML)	15 July 2024	9 September 2025	
Deputy Prime Minister
2.	Deputy Prime Minister; Minister for Urban Development	Prakash Man Singh	Congress	15 July 2024	9 September 2025	
3.	Deputy Prime Minister; Minister for Finance	Bishnu Prasad Paudel	CPN (UML)	15 July 2024	9 September 2025	
Cabinet Ministers
4.	Minister for Communication and Information Technology	Prithvi Subba Gurung	CPN (UML)	15 July 2024	9 September 2025	
5.	Minister for Home Affairs	Ramesh Lekhak	Congress	15 July 2024	8 September 2025	
6.	Minister for Labour, Employment and Social Security	Sharat Singh Bhandari	Loktantrik Samajwadi	15 July 2024	9 September 2025	
7.	Minister for Foreign Affairs	Arzu Rana Deuba	Congress	15 July 2024	9 September 2025	
8.	Minister for Water Supply	Pradeep Yadav	PSP	15 July 2024	9 September 2025	
9.	Minister for Land Management, Cooperatives and Poverty Alleviation	Balaram Adhikari	CPN (UML)	15 July 2024	9 September 2025	
10.	Minister for Industry, Commerce and Supplies	Damodar Bhandari	CPN (UML)	15 July 2024	9 September 2025	
11.	Minister for Women, Children and Senior Citizen	Nawal Kishor Sah	PSP	15 July 2024	9 September 2025	
12.	Minister for Physical Infrastructure and Transport	Devendra Dahal	CPN (UML)	15 July 2024	9 September 2025	
13.	Minister for Youth and Sports	Teju Lal Chaudhary	Congress	15 July 2024	9 September 2025	
14.	Minister for Health and Population	Pradip Paudel	Congress	15 July 2024	9 September 2025	
15.	Minister for Law, Justice and Parliamentary Affairs	Ajay Chaurasiya	Congress	15 July 2024	9 September 2025	
16.	Minister for Culture, Tourism and Civil Aviation	Badri Pandey	Congress	15 July 2024	9 September 2025	
17.	Minister for Agriculture and Livestock Development	Ram Nath Adhikari	Congress	15 July 2024	9 September 2025	
18.	Minister for Education, Science and Technology	Bidya Bhattarai	CPN (UML)	15 July 2024	22 April 2025	
18.	Minister for Education, Science and Technology	Raghuji Pant	CPN (UML)	24 April 2025	9 September 2025	
19.	Minister for Defence	Manbir Rai	CPN (UML)	15 July 2024	9 September 2025	
20.	Minister for Energy, Water Resources and Irrigation	Deepak Khadka	Congress	15 July 2024	9 September 2025	
21.	Minister for Federal Affairs and General Administration	Raj Kumar Gupta	CPN (UML)	15 July 2024	15 July 2025	
21.	Minister for Federal Affairs and General Administration	Bhagwati Neupane	CPN (UML)	15 July 2025	9 September 2025	
22.	Minister for Forests and Environment	Aain Bahadur Shahi Thakuri	Congress	15 July 2024	9 September 2025	
State Ministers
23.	Minister of state for Culture, Tourism and Civil Aviation	Arun Kumar Chaudhary	Nagrik Unmukti	3 August 2024	9 September 2025	
24.	Minister of state for Forests and Environment	Rupa Bishwakarma	Congress	3 August 2024	9 September 2025	
25.	Minister of state for Energy, Water Resources and Irrigation	Purna Bahadur Tamang	Congress	3 August 2024	23 April 2025	
25.	Minister of state for Energy, Water Resources and Irrigation	Kham Bahadur Garbuja	Congress	4 May 2025	12 September 2025	

== Ministers by party ==
1. Nepali Congress (46.0%)
2. CPN (UML) (38.0%)
3. PSP (8.00%)
4. Loktantrik Samajwadi (4.00%)
5. Nagrik Unmukti (4.00%)

Party	Cabinet Ministers	State ministers	Total
Congress	10	1	11
CPN (UML)	9	0	9
PSP	2	0	2
Loktantrik Samajwadi	1	0	1
Nagrik Unmukti	0	1	1
Total	22	2	24
