= Rana Kumari Balampaki Magar =

Nepalese politician

Honourable Rana Kumari Balampaki Magar
- रण कुमारी विम्पाकी मगर

Member of Parliament, Pratinidhi Sabha for CPN (UML)
- Incumbent
- Assumed office 2022

Personal details
- Party: CPN (UML)
- Other party: CPN (UML)
- Spouse: Dil Bahadur Shrestha
- Parents: Purna Bahadur (father); Som Kumari (mother)

Rana Kumari Balampaki Magar is a Nepalese politician, belonging to the CPN (UML) Party. She is currently serving as a member of the 2nd Federal Parliament of Nepal. In the 2022 Nepalese general election she was elected as a proportional representative from the indigenous people category.
