= Saraswati Subba =

Nepalese politician

Honourable Saraswati Subba
- सरस्वती सुब्बा

Member of Parliament, Pratinidhi Sabha for CPN (UML)
- Incumbent
- Assumed office 2022

Personal details
- Party: CPN (UML)
- Other party: CPN (UML)
- Parents: Babu Ram (father); Durga Devi (mother)

Saraswati Subba is a Nepalese politician, belonging to the CPN (UML) Party. She is currently serving as a member of the 2nd Federal Parliament of Nepal. In the 2022 Nepalese general election she was elected as a proportional representative from the indigenous people category.
