= Shanti Shrestha =

Nepalese politician

Honourable Shanti Shrestha
- शान्ती श्रेष्ठ

Member of Parliament, Pratinidhi Sabha for CPN (UML)
- Incumbent
- Assumed office 2022

Personal details
- Party: CPN (UML)
- Other party: CPN (UML)
- Spouse: Rakshya Bahadur Shrestha
- Parents: Sete (father); Shanta (mother)

Shanti Shrestha is a Nepalese politician, belonging to the CPN (UML) Party. She is currently serving as a member of the 2nd Federal Parliament of Nepal. In the 2022 Nepalese general election she was elected as a proportional representative from the indigenous people category.
