= Urmila Majhi =

Nepalese politician

Honourable Urmila Majhi

Member of Parliament, Pratinidhi Sabha for CPN (Maoist Centre)
- Incumbent
- Assumed office 2022

Personal details
- Party: CPN (Maoist Centre)
- Other party: CPN (Maoist Centre)
- Spouse: Santosh Poudel
- Parents: Najar Man (father); Lila Maya (mother)

Urmila Majhi is a Nepalese politician, belonging to the CPN (Maoist Centre) Party. She is currently serving as a member of the 2nd Federal Parliament of Nepal. In the 2022 Nepalese general election she was elected as a proportional representative from the indigenous people category.
