= Durga Rai =

Nepalese politician

Honourable Durga Rai

Member of Parliament, Pratinidhi Sabha for CPN (Maoist Centre)
- Incumbent
- Assumed office 2022

Personal details
- Party: CPN (Maoist Centre)
- Other party: CPN (Maoist Centre)
- Spouse: Kishor Kumar Rai (Divorced)
- Children: Khabalung Rai Ruthulung Rai
- Parents: Bhim Bahadur (father); Manarekha (mother)

Durga Rai is a Nepalese politician, belonging to the CPN (Maoist Centre) Party. She is currently serving as a member of the 2nd Federal Parliament of Nepal. In the 2022 Nepalese general election she was elected as a proportional representative from the indigenous people category.
