= Mijar (disambiguation) =

Mijar is a village in Karnataka, India.

Mijar may also refer to:

- Sita Mijar, Nepalese politician
- Umesh Mijar, Indian film actor
