= Tsering Lhamu Lama =

Nepalese politician

Honourable Tsering Lhamu Lama

Member of Parliament, Pratinidhi Sabha for CPN (Maoist Centre)

Personal details
- Party: CPN (Maoist Centre)
- Other party: CPN (Maoist Centre)
- Spouse: Dawa Tamang
- Parents: Guru (father); Kauri Chezom (mother)

Tsering Lhamu Lama is a Nepalese politician, belonging to the CPN (Maoist Centre) Party. She is currently serving as a member of the 2nd Federal Parliament of Nepal. In the 2022 Nepalese general election she was elected as a proportional representative from the indigenous people category.
