= Amritlal =

Amritlal is a given name. Notable people with the name include:

- Amritlal Hargovinddas (1889–1964), Indian industrialist and philanthropist
- Amritlal Nagar (1916–1990), Hindi writer
- Amritlal Ojha (1890–1944), Indian businessman
- Amritlal Tarwala (1930–2008), Indian politician
- Amritlal Vegad (1928–2018), Indian writer and painter
- Amritlal Vithaldas Thakkar (1869–1951), Indian social worker
- Amritlal Yagnik, Gujarati critic and writer
- Amrit Lal Meena
- Amrit Lal Bharti
- Amrit Lal Rajbanshi
- Amrit Lal (1940s Southern Punjab cricketer)
- Amrit Lal (1960s Southern Punjab cricketer)
