= Damodar Poudel Bairagi =

Nepali politician

- दामोदर पौडेल वैरागी

Member of Parliament, Pratinidhi Sabha
- Incumbent
- Assumed office 26 December 2022
- Preceded by: Jagat Bahadur Sunar
- Constituency: Kaski 3

Personal details
- Born: 17 April 1966 (age 59) Kaski District
- Party: CPN (UML)

Damodar Poudel Bairagi is a Nepalese politician, belonging to the CPN (UML) currently serving as a member of the 2nd Federal Parliament of Nepal. In the 2022 Nepalese general election, he was elected from the Kaski 3 (constituency).
