= Surya Kumari Shrestha =

Nepalese politician

Honourable Surya Kumari Shrestha
- सुर्य कुमारी श्रेष्ठ

Member of Parliament, Pratinidhi Sabha for CPN (UML)
- Incumbent
- Assumed office 2022

Personal details
- Party: CPN (UML)
- Other party: CPN (UML)
- Spouse: Dil Bahadur Shrestha
- Parents: Purna Bahadur (father); Som Kumari (mother)

Surya Kumari Shrestha is a Nepalese politician, belonging to the CPN (UML) Party. She is currently serving as a member of the 2nd Federal Parliament of Nepal. In the 2022 Nepalese general election she was elected as a proportional representative from the indigenous people category.
