= Laxmi Tiwari =

Nepalese politician

Honourable Laxmi Tiwari
- लक्ष्मी तिवारी

Member of Parliament, Pratinidhi Sabha
- Incumbent
- Assumed office 22 December 2022
- President: Bidya Devi Bhandari
- Constituency: Party List

Personal details
- Party: Rastriya Swatantra Party
- Spouse: Rabindra Kumar Gyanwali
- Children: Aishworya Gyawali Anjila Gyawali
- Parents: Indra Jeet (father); Tara (mother)

Laxmi Tiwari is a Nepalese politician, belonging to the Rastriya Swatantra Party. She is currently serving as a member of the 2nd Federal Parliament of Nepal. In the 2022 Nepalese general election she was elected as a proportional representative from the Madheshi people category.
