= Hemraj Rai =

Nepalese politician

Honourable Hemraj Rai
- हेमराज राई

Member of Parliament, Pratinidhi Sabha for CPN (UML)
- Incumbent
- Assumed office 2022

Personal details
- Party: CPN (UML)
- Other political affiliations: CPN (UML)
- Spouse: Shanti Kala Rai
- Parents: Dhan Bahadur (father); Shiva Kumari (mother)

Hemraj Rai is a Nepalese politician, belonging to the CPN (UML) Party. He is currently serving as the member of a 2nd Federal Parliament of Nepal. In the 2022 Nepalese general election he was elected as a proportional representative from the indigenous people category.
