= Bina Kumari Thanet =

Nepalese politician

Honourable Bina Kumari Thanet
- बिना कुमारी थनैत

Member of Parliament, Pratinidhi Sabha for Nepali Congress
- Incumbent
- Assumed office 2022

Personal details
- Party: Nepali Congress
- Other party: Nepali Congress
- Spouse: Bhoj Bahadur Thanet
- Parents: Tek Narayan (father); Hira moti (mother)

Bina Kumari Thanet is a Nepalese politician, belonging to the Nepali Congress Party. She is currently serving as a member of the 2nd Federal Parliament of Nepal. In the 2022 Nepalese general election she was elected as a proportional representative from the Tharu people category.
