= Mina Yadav =

Nepalese politician

Honourable Mina Yadav

Member of Parliament, Pratinidhi Sabha for CPN (Maoist Centre)
- Incumbent
- Assumed office 2022

Personal details
- Party: CPN (Maoist Centre)
- Other party: CPN (Maoist Centre)
- Spouse: Shiva Pujan Rai
- Parents: Nirpat (father); Kalsuya (mother)

Mina Yadav is a Nepalese politician, belonging to the CPN (Maoist Centre) Party. She is currently serving as a member of the 2nd Federal Parliament of Nepal. In the 2022 Nepalese general election she was elected as a proportional representative from the Madhesi people category.
