= Rama Koirala Paudel =

Nepalese politician

Honourable Rama Koirala Paudel

Member of Parliament, Pratinidhi Sabha for Nepali Congress
- Incumbent
- Assumed office 2022

Personal details
- Party: Nepali Congress
- Other party: Nepali Congress
- Spouse: Ishwoar Sharma Poudel
- Parents: Ganga Prasad (father); Tara (mother)

Rama Koirala Paudel is a Nepalese politician, belonging to the Nepali Congress Party. She is currently serving as a member of the 2nd Federal Parliament of Nepal. In the 2022 Nepalese general election she was elected as a proportional representative from the Khas people category.
