= Sushila Thing =

Nepalese politician

Honourable Sushila Thing
- सुसिला थिङ

Member of Parliament, Pratinidhi Sabha for Nepali Congress
- In office 2022 – 12 September 2025

Personal details
- Party: Nepali Congress
- Other party: Nepali Congress
- Parents: Mardan Singh (father); Hira Devi (mother)

Sushila Thing is a Nepalese politician, belonging to the Nepali Congress Party. She served as a member of the 2nd Federal Parliament of Nepal. In the 2022 Nepalese general election she was elected as a proportional representative from the indigenous people category.
