= Narayani Sharma =

Nepalese politician

Honourable Narayani Sharma

Member of Parliament, Pratinidhi Sabha for CPN (Maoist Centre)
- Incumbent
- Assumed office 2022

Personal details
- Party: Pragatisheel Loktantrik Party
- Other party: CPN (Maoist Centre)
- Spouse: Lumakanta Neupane
- Parents: Iskananda (father); Narmada (mother)

Narayani Sharma is a Nepalese politician, belonging to the Progressive National Campaign, Nepal. She also served as a member of the 2nd Federal Parliament of Nepal. In the 2022 Nepalese general election she was elected as a proportional representative from the Khas people category.

== See also ==
- Progressive National Campaign, Nepal
