= Liladevi Bokhim Limbu =

Nepalese politician

Honourable Liladevi Bokhim Limbu
- लिला देवी बोखिम लिम्वु

Member of Parliament, Pratinidhi Sabha for Nepali Congress
- Incumbent
- Assumed office 2022

Personal details
- Party: Nepali Congress
- Other party: Nepali Congress
- Spouse: Udaya Narayan Limbu
- Parents: Kali Bahadur (father); Sanch Maya (mother)

Liladevi Bokhim Limbu is a Nepalese politician, belonging to the Nepali Congress Party. She is currently serving as a member of the 2nd Federal Parliament of Nepal. In the 2022 Nepalese general election she was elected as a proportional representative from the indigenous people category.
