= Shahnaz Rahman =

Nepalese politician

Member of Parliament, Pratinidhi Sabha
- In office 22 December 2022 – March 2023
- President: Bidya Devi Bhandari

Personal details
- Party: People's Socialist Party
- Spouse: Mohamad Safiur Rahman
- Parents: Yam Yam (father); Saida (mother)

Shahnaz Rahman was a Nepalese politician, belonging to the People's Socialist Party. She was serving as a member of the 2nd Federal Parliament of Nepal when she died due to a cardiac arrest. In the 2022 Nepalese general election she was elected as a proportional representative from the Nepalese Muslims category.
