= Dayal Bahadur Shahi =

Nepalese politician

Honourable Dayal Bahadur Shahi

Member of Parliament, Pratinidhi Sabha for CPN (UML)
- Incumbent
- Assumed office 2022

Personal details
- Party: CPN (UML)
- Other political affiliations: CPN (UML)
- Spouse: Devi Shahi
- Parents: Gokul Shahi (father); Bhagisara Shahi (mother)

Dayal Bahadur Shahi is a Nepalese politician, belonging to the CPN (UML) Party. He is currently serving as a member of the 2nd Federal Parliament of Nepal. In the 2022 Nepalese general election he was elected as a proportional representative from the Khas people category.
