= Manorama Sherchan =

Nepalese politician

Honourable Manorama Sherchan
- मनोरमा शेरचन

Member of Parliament, Pratinidhi Sabha for Nepali Congress
- Incumbent
- Assumed office 2022

Personal details
- Party: Nepali Congress
- Other party: Nepali Congress
- Spouse: Bijaya Sherchan
- Parents: Man Bahadur (father); Manjara (mother)

Manorama Sherchan is a Nepalese politician, belonging to the Nepali Congress Party. She is currently serving as a member of the 2nd Federal Parliament of Nepal. In the 2022 Nepalese general election she was elected as a proportional representative from the indigenous people category.
