= Devi Prakash Bhattachan =

Nepalese politician

Honourable Devi Prakash Bhattachan
- देवी प्रकाश भट्टचन

Member of Parliament, Pratinidhi Sabha for CPN (UML)
- Incumbent
- Assumed office 2022

Personal details
- Party: CPN (UML)
- Other political affiliations: CPN (UML)
- Children: 2
- Parents: Bal Nar Singh (father); Yam Kumari (mother)

Devi Prakash Bhattachan is a Nepalese politician, belonging to the CPN (UML) Party. He is currently serving as a member of the 2nd Federal Parliament of Nepal. In the 2022 Nepalese general election he was elected as a proportional representative from the indigenous people category.
