= Rukmini Rana Baraili =

Nepalese politician

Honourable Rukmini Rana Baraili

Member of Parliament, Pratinidhi Sabha for CPN (UML)
- Incumbent
- Assumed office 2022

Personal details
- Party: CPN (UML)
- Other party: CPN (UML)
- Spouse: Prem Bahadur Baraili
- Parents: Pren Bahadur (father); Shanti (mother)

Rukmini Rana Baraili is a Nepalese politician, belonging to the CPN (UML) Party. She is currently serving as a member of the 2nd Federal Parliament of Nepal. In the 2022 Nepalese general election she was elected as a proportional representative from the Dalit category.
