= Nagina Yadav =

Nepalese politician

Honourable Nagina Yadav
- नगिना यादव
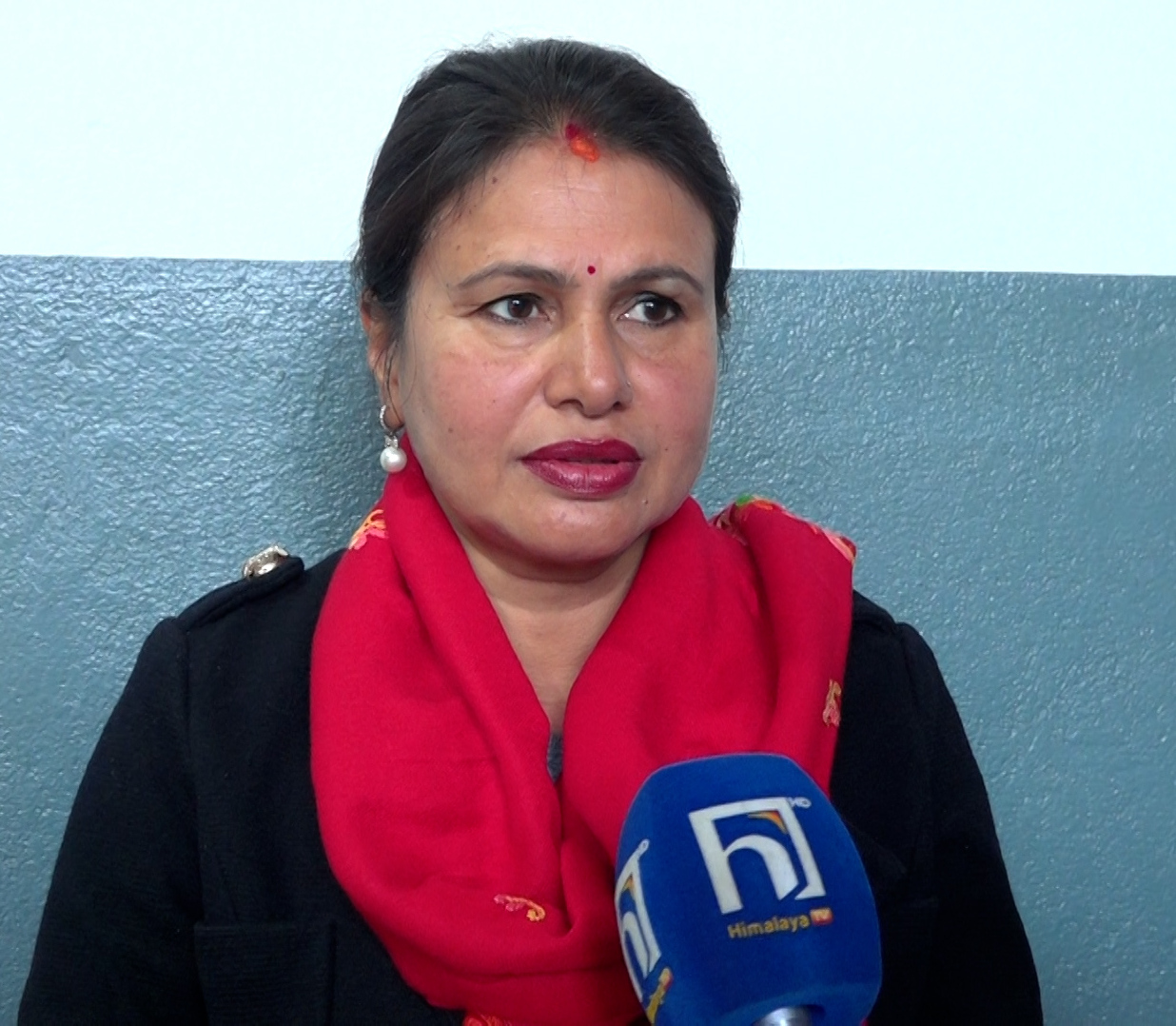

Member of Parliament, Pratinidhi Sabha for Nepali Congress
- Incumbent
- Assumed office 2022

Personal details
- Party: Nepali Congress
- Other party: Nepali Congress
- Spouse: Manoj Kumar Yadav
- Parents: Jay Narayan (father); Sarita Devi (mother)

Nagina Yadav is a Nepalese politician, belonging to the Nepali Congress Party. She is currently serving as a member of the 2nd Federal Parliament of Nepal. In the 2022 Nepalese general election she was elected as a proportional representative from the Madhesi people category.
