= Kantika Sejuwal =

Nepalese politician

Honourable Kantika Sejuwal
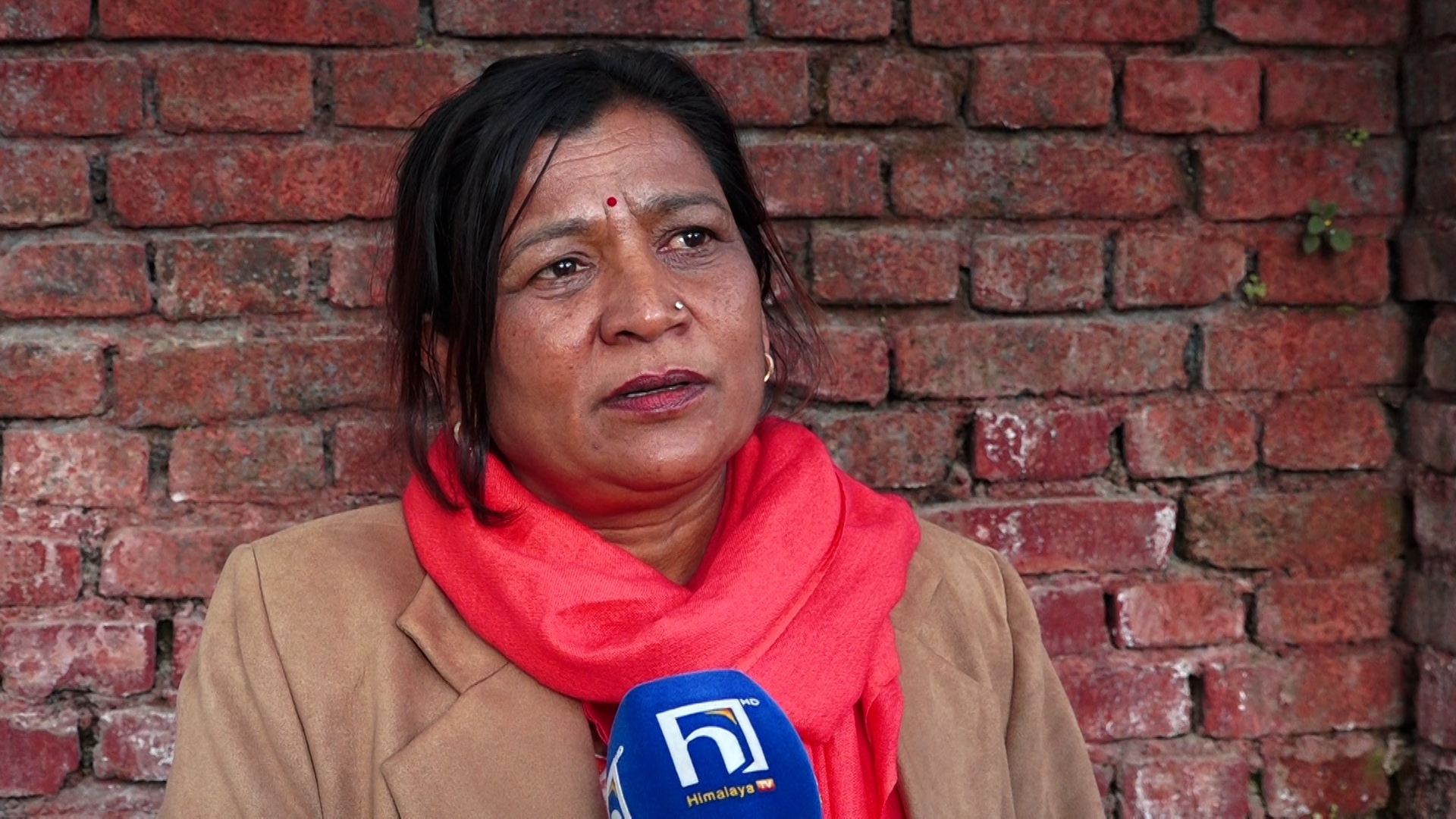

Member of Parliament, Pratinidhi Sabha for Nepali Congress
- Incumbent
- Assumed office 2022

Personal details
- Born: 1972 (age 53–54)
- Party: Nepali Congress
- Other party: Nepali Congress
- Spouse: Manav Sejuwal
- Parents: Lok Bahadur (father); Chanda Devi (mother)

Kantika Sejuwal is a Nepalese politician, belonging to the Nepali Congress Party. She is currently serving as a member of the 2nd Federal Parliament of Nepal. In the 2022 Nepalese general election she was elected as a proportional representative from the Khas people category.
