= Ishwar Bahadur Rijal =

Nepalese politician

Honourable Ishwar Bahadur Rijal
- इश्वर वहादरु रिजाल

Member of Parliament, Pratinidhi Sabha for CPN (UML)
- Incumbent
- Assumed office 2022

Personal details
- Party: CPN (UML)
- Other political affiliations: CPN (UML)
- Spouse: Jayanti B.K.
- Parents: Rana Bahadur (father); Rana Kumari (mother)

Ishwar Bahadur Rijal is a Nepalese politician, belonging to the CPN (UML) Party. He is currently serving as a member of the 2nd Federal Parliament of Nepal. In the 2022 Nepalese general election he was elected as a proportional representative from the Dalit category.
