= Kalpana Chaudhary =

Nepalese politician

Honourable Kalpana Chaudhary
- कल्पना चौधरी

Member of Parliament, Pratinidhi Sabha for Nepali Congress
- Incumbent
- Assumed office 2022

Personal details
- Party: Nepali Congress
- Other party: Nepali Congress
- Spouse: Jitendra Chaudhary
- Parents: Gopal (father); Dip Kumari (mother)

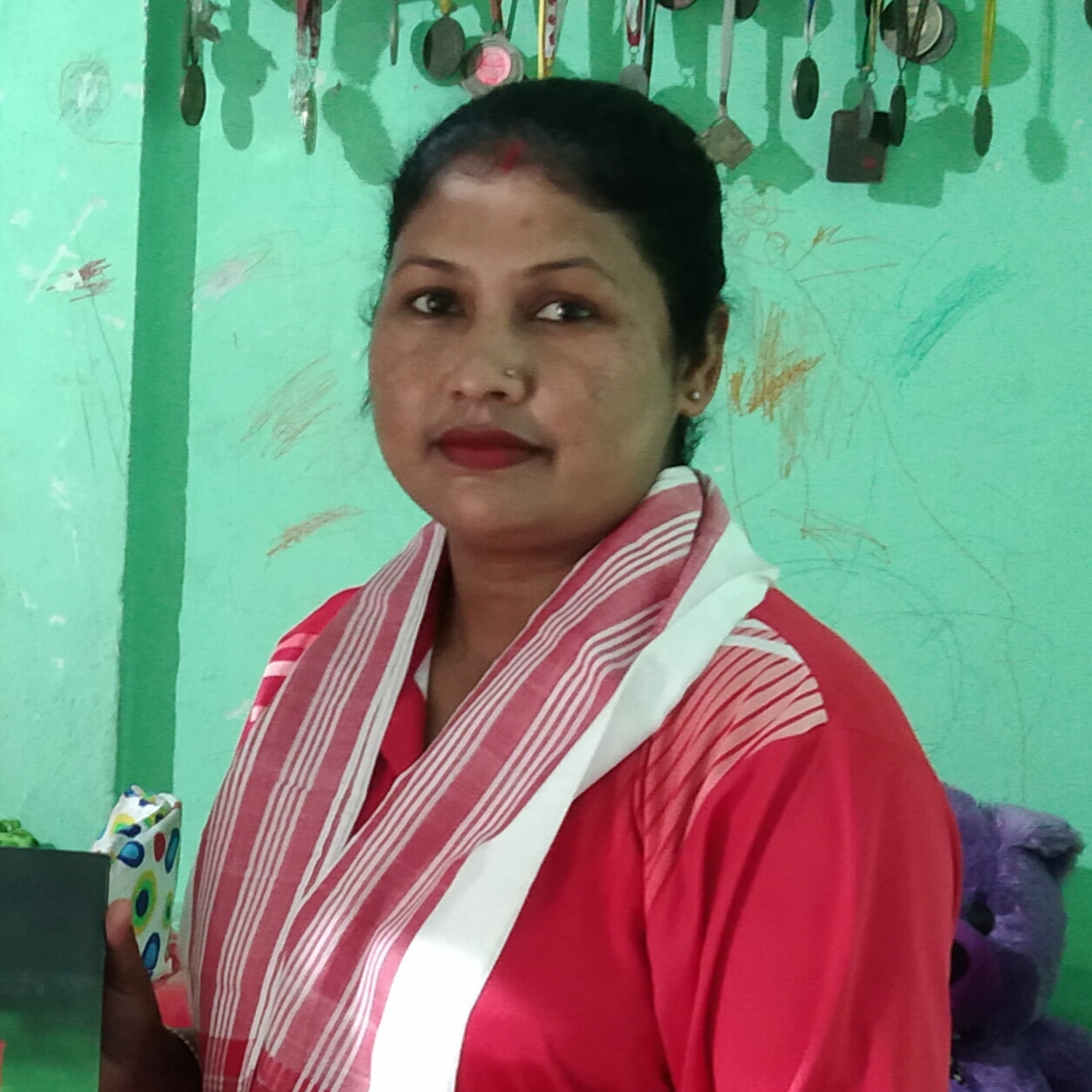
Kalpana Chaudhary, 2022

Kalpana Chaudhary is a Nepalese politician, belonging to the Nepali Congress Party. She is currently serving as a member of the 2nd Federal Parliament of Nepal. In the 2022 Nepalese general election she was elected as a proportional representative from the tharu people category.
