= Dhaka Kumar Shrestha =

Nepalese politician

Honourable Dhaka Kumar Shrestha
- ढाका कुमार श्रेष्ठ

Member of Parliament, Pratinidhi Sabha (Suspended)
- In office 22 December 2022 – 9 April 2023
- President: Ram Chandra Paudel
- Constituency: Party List

Personal details
- Party: Rastriya Swatantra Party
- Spouse: Minu Shrestha
- Parents: Chet Kumar (father); Padam Kumari (mother)

Dhaka Kumar Shrestha is a Nepalese politician, formerly belonging to the Rastriya Swatantra Party. In the 2022 Nepalese general election he was elected as a proportional representative from the indigenous people category.

In 2023, Shrestha was suspended from parliament for asking 20 million from Durga Prasai of which audio was leaked. This controversy is thought to defame the party and cause loss amidst the by-elections. Later a new audio was found which proved him of abusing authority.
