= Maya Rai =

Nepalese politician

Honourable Maya Rai
- माया राई

Member of Parliament, Pratinidhi Sabha for Nepali Congress
- Incumbent
- Assumed office 2022

Personal details
- Party: Nepali Congress
- Other party: Nepali Congress
- Parents: Purna Bahadur (father); Kalpana (mother)

Maya Rai is a Nepalese politician, belonging to the Nepali Congress Party. She is currently serving as a member of the 2nd Federal Parliament of Nepal. In the 2022 Nepalese general election she was elected as a proportional representative from the indigenous people category.

== Legal issues ==
In April 2025, Nepali Congress lawmaker Maya Rai was arrested in connection with a large-scale cooperative fraud case linked to the Swarnalakshmi Multipurpose Cooperative in Kalimati, Kathmandu. According to investigators, Rai was involved in the misappropriation of millions of rupees while serving as a board member and later as secretary of the cooperative between 2016 and 2019.

She was taken into custody from her residence in Kapan, Kathmandu, after reportedly being out of contact with authorities for over eight months.

The allegations include embezzlement of over NPR 23 million through irregular transactions during her time at the cooperative. After her arrest, the Kathmandu District Court approved a five-day remand for investigation.

Later, the Office of the Government Attorney filed formal charges under laws related to cooperative fraud and organized crime. The prosecution also submitted a supplementary case based on complaints from 20 depositors, demanding over NPR 3.7 million in restitution.
