= Ranendra Baraili =

Nepalese politician

Honourable Ranendra Baraili

Member of Parliament, Pratinidhi Sabha for CPN (Maoist Centre)
- Incumbent
- Assumed office 2022

Personal details
- Party: CPN (Maoist Centre)
- Spouse: Dinu Baraili
- Children: 2

Ranendra Baraili is a Nepalese politician, belonging to the CPN (Maoist Centre) Party. He is currently serving as a member of the 2nd Federal Parliament of Nepal. In the 2022 Nepalese general election he was elected as a proportional representative from the Dalit people category.
