= Sangita Mandal Dhanuk =

Nepalese politician

Honourable Sangita Mandal Dhanuk
- संगिता मन्णल धानुक

Member of Parliament, Pratinidhi Sabha for Nepali Congress
- Incumbent
- Assumed office 22 December 2022
- President: Bidhya Devi Bhandari

Personal details
- Party: Nepali Congress
- Other party: Nepali Congress
- Spouse: Indra Prasad Mandal
- Parents: Jay Narayan (father); Rita (mother)

Sangita Mandal Dhanuk is a Nepalese politician, belonging to the Nepali Congress Party. She is currently serving as a member of the 2nd Federal Parliament of Nepal. In the 2022 Nepalese general election she was elected as a proportional representative from the Madhesi people category.
