= Chanda Karki =

Nepalese politician

Honourable Dr. Chanda Karki
- डा.चन्दा कार्की

Member of Parliament, Pratinidhi Sabha
- Incumbent
- Assumed office 22 December 2022
- President: Bidya Devi Bhandari
- Constituency: Party List

Personal details
- Party: Rastriya Swatantra Party
- Spouse: Tekendra Karki
- Parents: Shiva Man Singh (father); Chandra Devi (mother)

Chanda Karki is a Nepalese politician and gynecologist, belonging to the Rastriya Swatantra Party. She is currently serving as a member of the 2nd Federal Parliament of Nepal. In the 2022 Nepalese general election she was elected as a proportional representative from the Khas people category.
