= Kusum Devi Thapa =

Nepalese politician

Honourable Kusum Devi Thapa
- कुसुमदेवी थापा

Agriculture, cooperative and natural resources committee
- Incumbent
- Assumed office July 31, 2024

Member of Parliament, Pratinidhi Sabha for Nepali Congress
- Incumbent
- Assumed office 2022

Personal details
- Party: Nepali Congress
- Other party: Nepali Congress
- Spouse: Ras Budha
- Parents: Bhakta Bahadur (father); Chandra Kala (mother)

Kusum Devi Thapa is a Nepalese politician, belonging to the Nepali Congress Party. She is currently serving as a member of the 2nd Federal Parliament of Nepal. In the 2022 Nepalese general election she was elected as a proportional representative from the indigenous people category. She is the Chairperson of the Agriculture, Cooperatives and Natural Resources Committee of the House of Representatives of Nepal since July 31, 2024.
