= Sita Kumari Rana =

Nepalese politician

Honourable Sita Kumari Rana
- सिता कुमारी राना

Member of Parliament, Pratinidhi Sabha for Nepali Congress
- Incumbent
- Assumed office 2022

Personal details
- Party: Nepali Congress
- Other party: Nepali Congress
- Spouse: Hira Singh Thapa
- Parents: Kisan Bahadur (father); Lali sara (mother)

Sita Kumari Rana is a Nepalese politician, belonging to the Nepali Congress Party. She is currently serving as a member of the 2nd Federal Parliament of Nepal. In the 2022 Nepalese general election she was elected as a proportional representative from the indigenous people category.
