= Kiran Kumar Sah =

Nepalese politician

Honourable Kiran Kumar Sah
- किरण कुमार साह

Member of Parliament, Pratinidhi Sabha
- Incumbent
- Assumed office 22 December 2022
- Constituency: Rautahat 2

Personal details
- Born: 10 December 1977 (age 48) Rautahat District
- Party: Independent
- Other political affiliations: CPN (Maoist Centre); PSP-N
- Spouse: Sharmila Koirala
- Parent: Hajari Sah Teli (father)

Kiran Kumar is a Nepalese politician, currently serving as a member of the 2nd Federal Parliament of Nepal. In the 2022 Nepalese general election, he was elected from the Rautahat 2 (constituency).
