= Kaluram Rai =

Nepalese politician

Honourable Kaluram Rai
- कालु राम राई

Member of Parliament, Pratinidhi Sabha for CPN (UML)
- Incumbent
- Assumed office 2022

Personal details
- Party: CPN (UML)
- Other political affiliations: CPN (UML)
- Spouse: Shuva Laxmi Thulung (Rai)
- Parents: Bishnu Dwoj (father); Lilawoti (mother)

Kaluram Rai is a Nepalese politician, belonging to the CPN (UML) Party. He is currently serving as a member of the 2nd Federal Parliament of Nepal. In the 2022 Nepalese general election he was elected as a proportional representative from the indigenous people category.
