= Jaweda Khatun Jaga =

Nepalese politician

Honourable Jaweda Khatun Jaga
- जावेदा खातुन जागा

Member of Parliament, Pratinidhi Sabha for Nepali Congress
- Incumbent
- Assumed office 2022

Personal details
- Party: Nepali Congress
- Other party: Nepali Congress
- Spouse: Farman Ali Jaga
- Parents: Jaibun Hasan (father); Rasid Khatun (mother)

Jaweda Khatun Jaga is a Nepalese politician, belonging to the Nepali Congress Party. She is currently serving as a member of the 2nd Federal Parliament of Nepal. In the 2022 Nepalese general election she was elected as a proportional representative from the Muslim people category.
