= Anjani Shrestha =

Nepalese politician

Honourable Anjani Shrestha
- अन्जनी श्रेष्ट

Member of Parliament, Pratinidhi Sabha for Nepali Congress
- Incumbent
- Assumed office 2022

Personal details
- Party: Nepali Congress
- Other party: Nepali Congress
- Spouse: Milan Babu Shrestha
- Parents: Laxmi Shankar (father); Sunumaya (mother)

Anjani Shrestha is a Nepalese politician, belonging to the Nepali Congress Party. She is currently serving as a member of the 2nd Federal Parliament of Nepal. In the 2022 Nepalese general election she was elected as a proportional representative from the indigenous people category.
