= Bimala Subedi =

Nepalese politician

Honourable Bimala Subedi

Member of Parliament, Pratinidhi Sabha for CPN (Maoist Centre)
- Incumbent
- Assumed office 2022

Personal details
- Party: CPN (Maoist Centre)
- Other party: CPN (Maoist Centre)
- Spouse: Pushpa Lamichhane
- Children: Bishow Lamichhane and Bijay Lamichhane
- Parents: Gom Raj (father); Nil Kumari (mother)

Bimala Subedi is a Nepalese politician, belonging to the CPN (Maoist Centre) Party. She is currently serving as a member of the 2nd Federal Parliament of Nepal. In the 2022 Nepalese general election she was elected as a proportional representative from the Khas people category.
