= Goma Labh =

Nepalese politician

Honourable Goma Labh

Member of Parliament, Pratinidhi Sabha for Janamat Party
- Incumbent
- Assumed office 2022

Personal details
- Party: Janamat Party
- Other party: Janamat Party
- Spouse: Rakesh Kumar Laav
- Parents: Bhav Nath (father); Bishnu Rai (mother)

Goma Labh is a Nepalese politician, belonging to the Janamat Party. She is currently serving as a member of the 2nd Federal Parliament of Nepal. In the 2022 Nepalese general election she was elected as a proportional representative from the Khas people category.
