= Saraj Ahmed Farooqui =

Nepalese politician

Honourable Saraj Ahmed Farooqui

Member of Parliament, Pratinidhi Sabha for CPN (UML)
- Incumbent
- Assumed office 2022

Personal details
- Party: CPN (UML)
- Other party: CPN (UML)
- Spouse: Najeema Pravin Farooqi
- Parents: Asphak Ahmed (father); Raffa (mother)

Saraj Ahmed Farooqui is a Nepalese politician, belonging to the CPN (UML) Party. He is currently serving as a member of the 2nd Federal Parliament of Nepal. In the 2022 Nepalese general election he was elected as a proportional representative from the Nepalese Muslims category.
