= Saraswati Bajiyam =

Nepalese politician

Honourable Saraswati Bajiyam
- सरस्वती वजिमय

Member of Parliament, Pratinidhi Sabha for Nepali Congress
- Incumbent
- Assumed office 2022

Personal details
- Party: Nepali Congress
- Other party: Nepali Congress
- Spouse: Parasuram Bajimaya
- Parents: Moti Lal (father); Nayan Devi (mother)

Saraswati Bajiyam is a Nepalese politician, belonging to the Nepali Congress Party, currently serving as a member of the 2nd Federal Parliament of Nepal. In the 2022 Nepalese general election she was elected as a proportional representative from Indigenous people category.
