= Shiva Nepali =

Nepalese politician

Honourable Shiva Nepali
- शिव नेपाली

Member of Parliament, Pratinidhi Sabha
- Incumbent
- Assumed office 22 December 2022
- President: Bidya Devi Bhandari
- Constituency: Party List

Personal details
- Party: Rastriya Swatantra Party
- Spouse: Pratikshya Nepali
- Parents: Dhurbalal (father); Junkiri (mother)

Shiva Nepali is a Nepalese politician, belonging to the Rastriya Swatantra Party. He is currently serving as a member of the 2nd Federal Parliament of Nepal. In the 2022 Nepalese general election he was elected as a proportional representative from the Dalit people category.
