= Sita Mijar =

Nepalese politician

Honourable Sita Mijar
- सिता मिजार

Member of Parliament, Pratinidhi Sabha for Nepali Congress
- Incumbent
- Assumed office 2022

Personal details
- Party: Nepali Congress
- Other party: Nepali Congress
- Parents: Chandraman (father); Batuli (mother)

Sita Mijar is a Nepalese politician, belonging to the Nepali Congress Party. She is currently serving as a member of the 2nd Federal Parliament of Nepal. In the 2022 Nepalese general election she was elected as a proportional representative from the dalit people category.
