= Ram Vishwakarma =

Indian Scientist

Ram Vishwakarma is an Indian scientist and a leader in the field of pharmaceutical research and integrative medicine. Born and educated in India, he has built a career that bridges cutting-edge scientific research and innovative industrial applications. He is an elected Fellow of the National Academy of Sciences, India.

== Early life and education ==
Vishwakarma pursued his Master’s in Organic Chemistry from Bundelkhand University, India, before earning a Ph.D. in Medicinal Chemistry from the Central Drug Research Institute (CDRI), Lucknow. His postdoctoral work at the University of Cambridge, UK, under the mentorship of Sir Alan Battersby, focused on the biosynthesis of Vitamin B12—a key contribution to biochemistry.

== Achievements ==
- Awarded the Sun Pharma (Ranbaxy) Research Award in Pharmaceutical Sciences (2014).
- Under his leadership, IIIM has developed innovative drug candidates, including IIIM-290, a potential cancer therapeutic.
