= Rajkumar Vishwakarma =

Indian Police Officer

- Born: May 10, 1963 (age 63); Jaunpur, Uttar Pradesh
- Education: B.E.(Mech. Engg.), Ph.D.
- Alma mater: IIT Roorkee
- Occupation: Police Officer
- Employer: Government of India
- Organization: Indian Police Service
- Father: B.R. Vishwakarma

Rajkumar Vishwakarma (born May 10, 1963) is an Indian former director general of police, currently serving as Uttar Pradesh's Chief Information Commissioner.

== Biography ==
Rajkumar Vishwakarma is the son of B.R. Vishwakarma.

Vishwakarma completed his Bachelor of Engineering in Mechanical Engineering from the University of Roorkee (now IIT Roorkee). He further pursued a Master's degree in Computer Science and a Ph.D. in Artificial Intelligence from the Indian Institute of Technology, Delhi. Before joining the police force, he was associated with Tata Motors for approximately two and a half years, during which he contributed to the design of the Tata 407.

== Career ==
Vishwakarma joined the Indian Police Service in 1988. Over the years, he has held various significant positions within the Uttar Pradesh Police Department. Notably, he served as the Director General and Chairman of the Uttar Pradesh Police Recruitment and Promotion Board. On March 31, 2023, he was appointed as the acting Director General of Police (DGP) of Uttar Pradesh, succeeding Devendra Singh Chauhan. He has accumulated a vast amount of land(hundreds of acres) and other investments like solar parks during his service as IPS.

=== Post-Retirement Appointment ===
Vishwakarma was appointed as the Chief Information Commissioner of Uttar Pradesh in April 2024, reflecting the government's recognition of his services.
