= 2023 Chitwan–2 by-election =

Nepali House of Representatives election

← 2022	23 April 2023

Constituency of Chitwan 2 in the House of Representatives
- Turnout: 63%
Candidate	Rabi Lamichhane	Jit Narayan Shrestha	Ram Prasad Neupane
Party	RSP	Congress	CPN (UML)
Popular vote	54,176	11,214	10,936
Percentage	70.03%	14.49%	14.14%
- Chitwan 2 in Bagmati Province
MP before election
Rabi Lamichhane
RSP
Elected MP
Rabi Lamichhane
RSP

The 2023 Chitwan–2 by-election was held in the Chitwan 2 constituency of Nepal on 23 April 2023. The by-election was held as the result of the vacation of the seat by the sitting member, Rabi Lamichhane, president of the Rastriya Swatantra Party. It was held alongside by-elections in Tanahun 1 and Bara 2.

RSP's Lamichhane was re-elected in the by-election, securing an even greater margin of votes than in the 2022 general election.

== Background ==
First elected in 2022, Lamichhane served as the Deputy Prime Minister and Minister of Home Affairs from 26 December 2022 to 27 January 2023, when he was stripped of all his elected positions after the Supreme Court ruled that Lamichhane did not follow due process to re-obtain his Nepali citizenship after renouncing his American citizenship, and thus, he was not a legal Nepali citizen. He reacquired the Nepali citizenship two days later, and contested the by-election.

=== 2022 election result ===
Candidate	Party	Votes	%
Rabi Lamichhane	Rastriya Swatantra Party	49,300	61.05
Umesh Shrestha	Nepali Congress	14,988	18.56
Krishna Bhakta Pokharel	CPN (UML)	14,652	18.14
Others		1,813	2.25
Total		80,753	100.00
Majority		34,312	
Rastriya Swatantra Party gain			
Source: ECN

== Result ==
Candidate	Party	Votes	%	+/–
Rabi Lamichhane	Rastriya Swatantra Party	54,176	70.03	+8.98
Jit Narayan Shrestha	Nepali Congress	11,214	14.49	−4.07
Ram Prasad Neupane	CPN (UML)	10,936	14.14	−4.00
Others		1,040	1.34	−0.91
Total		77,366	100.00	–
Majority		42,962		
Rastriya Swatantra Party hold				
Source: ECN
