= Kham Bahadur Garbuja =

Nepalese politician

Honourable Kham Bahadur Garbuja
- खम बहादुर गर्बुजा

Member of Parliament, Pratinidhi Sabha
- In office 22 December 2022 – 12 September 2026
- Constituency: Myagdi 1

Personal details
- Born: 27 January 1965 (age 61) Myagdi District
- Party: Nepali Congress
- Spouse: Bishnu Kumari Garbuja
- Parent: Chakrabir Garbuja (father)

Kham Bahadur Garbuja is a Nepalese politician, belonging to the Nepali Congress who served as a member of the 2nd Federal Parliament of Nepal. In the 2022 Nepalese general election, he won the election from Myagdi 1 (constituency).
