= Chandra Bahadur Bishwakarma =

Nepalese politician

Honourable Chandra Bahadur Bishwakarma

Member of Parliament, Pratinidhi Sabha for CPN (UML)
- Incumbent
- Assumed office 2022

Personal details
- Party: CPN (UML)
- Other party: CPN (UML)
- Spouse: Bimala B.K.
- Parents: Bale (father); Padani (mother)

Chandra Bahadur Bishwakarma is a Nepalese politician, belonging to the CPN (UML) Party. He is currently serving as a member of the 2nd Federal Parliament of Nepal. In the 2022 Nepalese general election he was elected as a proportional representative from the Dalit category.
