= Asha Bishwakarma =

Nepalese politician

Honourable Asha Bishwakarma
- रुपा विश्वकर्मा

Member of Parliament, Pratinidhi Sabha for Nepali Congress
- Incumbent
- Assumed office 2022
- Constituency: PR list

Personal details
- Party: Nepali Congress
- Other party: Nepali Congress
- Spouse: Krishna Bishwakarma
- Parents: Purna Bahadur (father); Ganga Devi (mother)

Asha Bishwakarma is a Nepalese politician, from the Nepali Congress Party. She is currently serving as a member of the 2nd Federal Parliament of Nepal. In the 2022 Nepalese general election she was elected as a proportional representative from the Dalit category.
