= Min Bahadur Bishwakarma =

Nepali politician

- मिन बहादुर विश्वकर्मा

Member of Parliament, Pratinidhi Sabha for Nepali Congress
- Incumbent
- Assumed office 4 March 2018
- Constituency: PR list

Member of Constituent Assembly for Nepali Congress
- In office 21 January 2014 – 14 October 2017
- Constituency: PR list

Personal details
- Born: 29 May 1968 (age 58) Sunsari District
- Party: Nepali Congress
- Spouse: Niru Poudel
- Children: 2

Meen Bahadur Bishwakarma is a Nepali politician, a member of the House of Representatives of the Federal Parliament of Nepal, and a former minister of commerce of the Government of Nepal. He is also a member of the central working committee of the main opposition party, Nepali Congress.
