= Bimala Bishwakarma =

Nepali politician

- विमला विश्वकर्मा

Member of Parliament, Pratinidhi Sabha for CPN (UML) party list
- In office 4 March 2018 – 18 September 2022

Personal details
- Born: 26 April 1977 (age 49)
- Party: CPN UML

Bimala Bishwakarma (also Bishwokarma) is a Nepali politician and a member of the House of Representatives, elected from CPN UML under the proportional representation system under the Dalit and women quota.
