= Kalu Devi Bishwakarma =

Nepali politician

- कलुदेवी विश्वकर्मा

Member of Parliament, Pratinidhi Sabha for Federal Socialist Forum party list
- Incumbent
- Assumed office 4 March 2018

Personal details
- Born: 30 December 1958 (age 67)
- Party: Loktantrik Samajwadi
- Other party: Samyukta Janamorcha; Janamorcha Nepal; FSF-N; Samajbadi; PSP-N
- Spouse: Dan Bahadur Bishwakarma
- Children: 4
- Parents: Hari B.K. (father); Ambidevi B.K. (mother)

Kalu Devi Bishwakarma (surname also abbreviated to BK or B.K.) is a Nepali Dalit politician and a member of the House of Representatives of the federal parliament of Nepal. She was elected under the proportional representation system from Kailali District representing Federal Socialist Forum Nepal.

She claimed to have experienced difficulties renting an apartment in Kathmandu following her election to parliament, because of the prejudice of landlords against Dalits. Speaking in parliament, of her experience, she said that the word Dalit should be expunged from the records and replaced by Artisans.
