= Harka Maya Bishwakarma =

Nepalese politician

Honourable Harka Maya Bishwakarma

Member of Parliament, Pratinidhi Sabha for CPN (UML)
- Incumbent
- Assumed office 2022

Personal details
- Party: CPN (UML)
- Other party: CPN (UML)
- Spouse: Khang Bahadur B.K.
- Parents: Rana Bahadur (father); Chandra Maya (mother)

Harka Maya Bishwakarma is a Nepalese politician, belonging to the CPN (UML) Party. She is currently serving as a member of the 2nd Federal Parliament of Nepal. In the 2022 Nepalese general election she was elected as a proportional representative from the Dalit category.
