= Singha Bahadur Bishwakarma =

Nepali politician

Honourable Singh Bahadur Bishwakarma
- सिंहबहादुर विश्वकर्मा

Member of Rastriya Sabha
- Incumbent
- Assumed office 2018
- Prime Minister: Sher Bahadur Deuba
- Preceded by: Position created
- Constituency: Bagmati Province

Personal details
- Party: CPN (Unified Socialist)

Singha Bahadur Bishwakarma (Nepali: सिंहबहादुर विश्वकर्मा) is a Nepali politician belonging to CPN (Unified Socialist). He is also member of Rastriya Sabha and was elected from 2018 Nepalese National Assembly election.
