= Kulendra Bishwakarma =

Nepalese Singer (born 1985)

Kulendra Bishwakarma कुलेन्द्र विश्वकर्मा
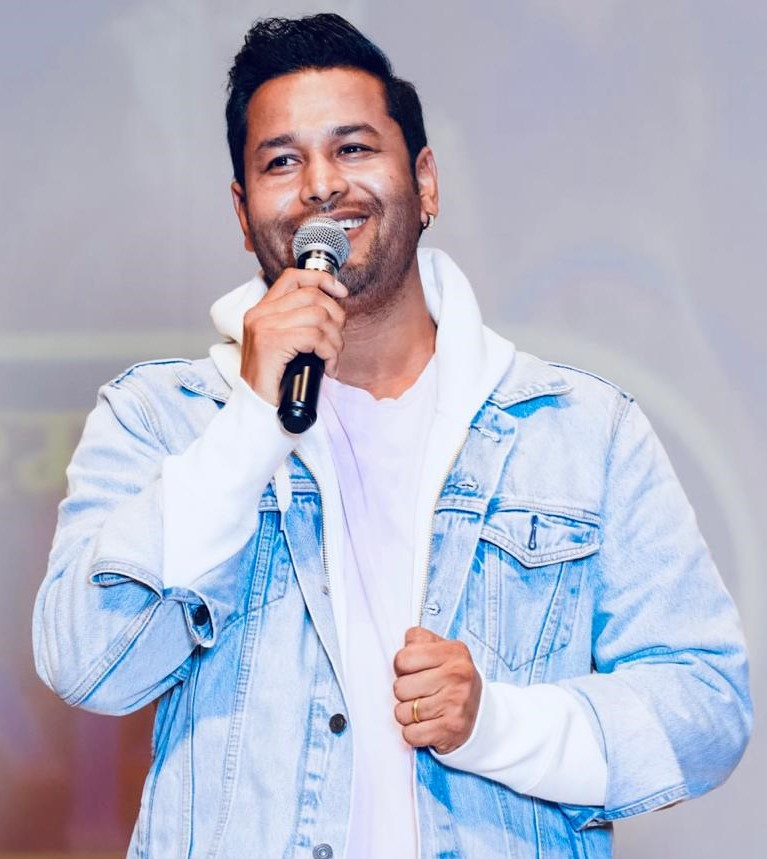

Background information
- Born: December 1985 (age 40); Parbat Nepal
- Origin: Nepal
- Genres: Nepali modern songs/folk Songs
- Occupation: Nepali Singer
- Years active: 2003–present

Kulendra Bishwokarma (Nepali: कुलेन्द्र विश्वकर्मा) is a Nepali folk singer from the Parbat District of Nepal. He was born on December 29, 1985. One of his most popular songs is "Salko Patko Tapari." He Started His Musical Career from 2061 BS.

== About ==
Bishwokarma is a well-known singer in Nepal. He has dedicated over a decade to his singing career. "Ke Cha Hal Chala" was the first song he released. So far, he has acted in more than 30 music videos as a model and has sung over 2000 Nepali songs. Some of his most popular songs are "Salko Patko Tapari," "Najau Hia Sanu Padherima," "Rumal Halai Halai," "Dadai Phurke Sallo," and "Jimbal Ko Agani Ma." He awards have included the National Music Awards and the Bindawasani Music Awards. He was the judge of Nepali television realty show Nepal Lok Star.

== Early life ==
Kulendra Bishwakarma, began his career in 2005 with his debut album "Ke Cha Halchal." His second song, "Pashchim Purbako," cemented his status as a professional artist.

== Songs ==
SN	Song title	Gener	Credit	Release on	ref
1	Salko patko Tapari huni	Folk Duet	Cast, Singer	2018	
2	Phul Hau Timi				
3	Silautoma Chatani	Folk Duet	Singer, Cast	2021	
4	Najau Hai sanu Padherima	Folk Duet	Singer	2020	
5	Rumal Halai Halai	Folk Duet	Singer	2021	
6	Dadai Phurke Sallo	Folk Duet	Singer	2020	
7	Chhaina Gunaso				
8	Rudai Rudai Base				
9	Phool Hau Timi	Folk Duet	Singer, Cast	2021	
10	Jaljala	Folk Duet	Singer	2021	
11	Vitamin U	Folk Duet	Singer	2020	
12	Das Tale Ghar	Folk Duet	Singer	2019	
13	Mayako SAhar	Folk Duet	Singer	2024	

== Awards ==
SN	Award Title	Award Category	Song	ref
1	NIM Award -2023	Best Folk Singer	Jaljala	
2	Music Awards 2020	Folk Record of the year		
3	4th Epic MUsic Awards 2020	Best Folk & Duit Song Singer	Jaljala	
4	Jyoti Films Award 2078	Best Singer of The Year	Jaljala	
5	Image Music Award 2019	Best Folkduet Song	Salko Patko Tapari Hune	
6	Radio Kantipur National Music Awards 2076	People Choice Award (Folkduet)	Salko Patko Tapari Hune	
7	Music Khabar Music Award 2076	Best Singer Male (Folkduet)	Salko Patko Tapari Hune	
8	Hits FM music awards	Folk Record of the Year	Salko Patko Tapari Hune	
9	National Music Award 2019	Public Choice Award	Salko Patko Tapari Hune	

== Honors ==
SN	Honor Title	ref
1	Prabal Janasewashree charthurt shreeni - Nepal Government	

== Judge ==
SN	Name	Television	ref
1	Himalaya lok star	Himalaya TV	
2	Dohori Icon	Yoho Television	
3	Pim Nepal Film Festival -2022 (Award Program)	-	
