= Jagat Bahadur Sunar Bishwakarma =

Nepali politician and minister

Jagat Bahadur Sunar (Bishwakarma)
- जगत बहादुर सुनार (विश्वकर्मा)

Minister of Youth and Sports
- In office 16 March 2018 – 25 December 2020
- President: Bidhya Devi Bhandari
- Prime Minister: KP Oli
- Preceded by: Rajendra Kumar KC
- Succeeded by: Dawa Lama Tamang

Member of Parliament, Pratinidhi Sabha
- In office 4 March 2018 – 18 September 2022
- Preceded by: Rabindra Prasad Adhikari
- Constituency: Kaski 3

Personal details
- Born: 18 May 1974 (age 52)
- Party: CPN (UML)

Jagat Bahadur Sunar Bishwakarma is a Nepali politician, member of the Nepal House of Representatives and a former minister for Youth and Sports. He is a member of the ruling Nepal Communist Party (NCP), and was elected to the House of Representatives from Kaski-3 constituency.
