= Rupa Bishwakarma =

Nepalese politician

Honourable Rupa Bishwakarma
- रुपा विश्वकर्मा

Minister of State for Forests and Environment of Nepal
- In office 3 August 2024 – 9 September 2025
- President: Ram Chandra Poudel
- Prime Minister: K. P. Sharma Oli
- Preceded by: Asha Kumari B.K.

Member of Parliament, Pratinidhi Sabha for Nepali Congress
- In office 22 December 2022 – 12 September 2025

Personal details
- Party: Nepali Congress
- Other party: Nepali Congress
- Parents: Bhuwan Singh (father); Pawisara (mother)

Rupa Bishwakarma is a Nepalese politician, belonging to the Nepali Congress Party. Bishwakarma is currently serving as the Minister of State for Forests and Environment of Government of Nepal since 3 August 2024. She is currently serving as a member of the 2nd Federal Parliament of Nepal. In the 2022 Nepalese general election she was elected as a proportional representative from the Dalit category.
