= Ethnic groups in Nepal =

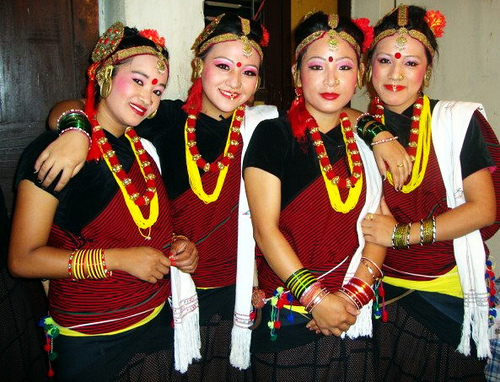
Magar girls in ethnic dress. Magars are the most populous Janajati group in Nepal.

Ethnic groups in Nepal are delineated using language, ethnic identity or the caste system in Nepal. They are categorized by common culture and endogamy. Endogamy carves out ethnic groups in Nepal. Nepal is one of the most ethnically diverse countries in the world with many cultures, languages, and traditions shaped by its geography and history. According to the National Population and Housing Census 2021, Nepal is home to 142 distinct caste and ethnic groups, an increase from 125 in the 2011 census. These groups speak over 120 languages and belong to various linguistic families, primarily Indo-Aryan and Tibeto-Burman.

== Broad Ethnic Categories of Nepal ==
Nepal is home to a diverse ethnic landscape. According to the 2021 census and subsequent classifications, the population is categorized into Janajati, Khas-Arya (including Hill Dalits), Madhesi (including Madhesi Dalits), and Muslims.

Broad Ethnic Categories of Nepal (2021 Census)
S.N	Broad Ethnic Category	Sub-Category	Sub-Category Percentage	Linguistic Family	Total Percentage
1	Khas-Arya (Hill Caste Group)	Khas-Arya (Upper): Chhetri 16.45%, Bahun/Hill Brahmin 11.29%, Thakuri 1.70% and Sanyasi/Dashnami 0.68%	30.12%	Indo-Aryan	38.71%
1	Khas-Arya (Hill Caste Group)	Khas/Hill Dalit: Bishwakarma 5.04%, Pariyar 1.94%, Mijar 1.55% etc.	8.59%	Indo-Aryan	38.71%
2	Adivasi-Janajati	Hill Janajati: Western: Magar 6.9%, Gurung 1.86%, Ghale 0.12% etc.; Central: Tamang 5.62%, Chepang/Praja 0.29%, Jirel 0.02% etc.; Eastern (Kirati): Rai 2.2%, Limbu 1.42%, Sunuwar 0.27% etc.; Mountain: Sherpa 0.45%, Bhote 0.05%, Thakali 0.04% etc.	21.50%	Sino-Tibetan	30.44%
2	Adivasi-Janajati	Terai Adivasi: Terai-wide: Tharu 6.20%; Eastern Inner Terai: Danuwar 0.28%; Eastern Terai: Rajbanshi 0.45%, Santhal 0.20%, Dhimal 0.09% etc.	8.94%	Indo-Aryan, Austroasiatic, Dravidian and Sino-Tibetan	30.44%
3	Newars* (Kathmandu Valley Group)	Newar (Upper), Newar (Middle), Newar (Low), Newar (Buddhists)	4.60%	Sino-Tibetan	4.60%
4	Madhesi (Terai Caste Group)	Madhesi Castes: Madheshi (Upper): Terai/Maithil Brahmins, Kushwaha/Koiri, Rajput, Kayastha; Madheshi (Middle): Yadav, Bhumihar, Teli, Kurmi, Bania, Kalwar, Halwai, Mallah, Mali, Rajbhar etc.; Madheshi (Low): Dushadh, Tatma, Dhobi, Kahar, Natuwa, Khatik, Kalar, Bantar, Sudi, Nuniya, Kewat, Kumhar, Hajam etc.	16.06%	Indo-Aryan	20.83%
4	Madhesi (Terai Caste Group)	Madheshi (Dalit): Chamar, Dhanuk, Dom, Musahar, Dushadh, Tatma etc.	4.78%	Indo-Aryan	20.83%
5	Muslims	Terai Muslims, Hill Muslims (Churaute)	4.86%	Indo-Aryan	4.86%
6	Other groups	Marwadi, Bengali, Punjabi/Sikh	0.05%	Indo-Aryan	0.05%
6	Others, Not stated and Foreigners	–	0.51%	–	0.51%
Total					100%

Note: *Newars also fall under Hill-Janajati group of broader Adivasi-Janajati category as per legal categorization of ethnic groups. However, their cultural and social characteristics are different from other Hill-Janajati groups. They have internal caste system like Khas-Arya and Terai caste groups with division further along on religious line of Hinduism and Buddhism, sharing a common language.

== Linguistic groups ==
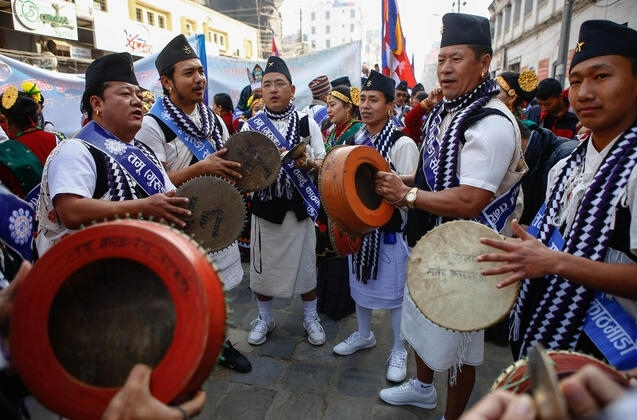
Gurung people from central Nepal playing one of their traditional drums, Khaijadi

Nepal's diverse linguistic heritage evolved from 2 major language groups: Indo-European languages and Tibeto-Burman languages. Nepal's languages are mostly either Indo-European or Sino-Tibetan, while only a very few of them are Austro-Asiatic and Dravidian.

Out of 123 languages of Nepal, the 48 Indo-European languages constitute the largest group in terms of the numeric strength of their speakers, nearly 82.1% of population.

The Sino-Tibetan family of Nepal's languages forms a part of its Tibeto-Burman group. Though spoken by relatively fewer people than the Indo-European family (17.3% of the population), it includes a greater number of languages, about 63 languages. Languages belonging to this group are Tamang, Nepal Bhasa (Newar), Magar, Magar Kham, Limbu, etc.

Tribhuvan University began surveying and recording threatened languages in 2010 and the government intends to use this information to include more languages on the next Nepalese census.

=== Mother tongues ===
There were 142 mother tongues according to the "National Report on caste/ethnicity, language & religion", National Population and Housing Census 2021 in Nepal.111 were previously reported in the earlier census 2011 and 13 were newly found in the census 2021.

The newly added mother tongues were Bhote, Lowa, Chum/Nubri, Baragunwa, Nar-Phu, Ranatharu, Karmarong, Mugali, Tichhurong Poike, Sadri, Done, Munda/Mudiyari and Kewarat.

Population by mother tongue and sex, NPHC 2021

Rank	Mother Tongue	Total	Percentage
	All Mother Tongues	29164578	100
1	Nepali	13084457	44.86
2	Maithili	3222389	11.05
3	Bhojpuri	1820795	6.24
4	Tharu	1714091	5.88
5	Tamang	1423075	4.88
6	Bajjika	1133764	3.89
7	Avadhi	864276	2.96
8	Nepalbhasha (Newari)	863380	2.96
9	Magar Dhut	810315	2.78
10	Doteli	494864	1.7
11	Urdu	413785	1.42
12	Yakthung/Limbu	350436	1.2
13	Gurung	328074	1.12
14	Magahi	230117	0.79
15	Baitadeli	152666	0.52
16	Rai	144512	0.5
17	Achhami	141444	0.48
18	Bantawa	138003	0.47
19	Rajbanshi	130163	0.45
20	Sherpa	117896	0.4
21	Khash	117511	0.4
22	Bajhangi	99631	0.34
23	Hindi	98399	0.34
24	Magar Kham	91753	0.31
25	Chamling	89037	0.31
26	Ranatharu	77766	0.27
27	Chepang	58392	0.2
28	Bajureli	56486	0.19
29	Santhali	53677	0.18
30	Danuwar	49992	0.17
31	Darchuleli	45649	0.16
32	Uranw/Urau	38873	0.13
33	Kulung	37912	0.13
34	Angika	35952	0.12
35	Majhi	32917	0.11
36	Sunuwar	32708	0.11
37	Thami	26805	0.09
38	Ganagai	26281	0.09
39	Thulung	24405	0.08
40	Bangla	23774	0.08
41	Ghale	23049	0.08
42	Sampang	21597	0.07
43	Marwadi	21333	0.07
44	Dadeldhuri	21300	0.07
45	Dhimal	20583	0.07
46	Tajpuriya	20349	0.07
47	Kumal	18435	0.06
48	Khaling	16514	0.06
49	Musalman	16252	0.06
50	Wambule	15285	0.05
51	Bahing/Bayung	14449	0.05
52	Yakkha	14241	0.05
53	Sanskrit	13906	0.05
54	Bhujel	13086	0.04
55	Bhote	12895	0.04
56	Darai	12156	0.04
57	Yamphu/Yamphe	10744	0.04
58	Nachhiring	9906	0.03
59	Hyolmo/Yholmo	9658	0.03
60	Dumi	8638	0.03
61	Jumli	8338	0.03
62	Bote	7687	0.03
63	Mewahang	7428	0.03
64	Puma	6763	0.02
65	Pahari	5946	0.02
66	Athpahariya	5580	0.02
67	Dungmali	5403	0.02
68	Jirel	5167	0.02
69	Tibetan	5053	0.02
70	Dailekhi	4989	0.02
71	Chum/Nubri	4284	0.01
72	Chhantyal	4282	0.01
73	Raji	4247	0.01
74	Thakali	4220	0.01
75	Meche	4203	0.01
76	Koyee	4152	0.01
77	Lohorung	3884	0.01
78	Kewarat	3469	0.01
79	Dolpali	3244	0.01
80	Done	3100	0.01
81	Mugali	2834	0.01
82	Jero/Jerung	2817	0.01
83	Karmarong	2619	0.01
84	Chhintang	2564	0.01
85	Lhopa	2348	0.01
86	Lapcha	2240	0.01
87	Munda/Mudiyari	2107	0.01
88	Manange	2022	0.01
89	Chhiling	2011	0.01
90	Dura	1991	0.01
91	Tilung	1969	0.01
92	Sign Language	1784	0.01
93	Byansi	1706	0.01
94	Balkura/Baram	1539	0.01
95	Baragunwa	1536	0.01
96	Sadri	1347	0
97	English	1323	0
98	Magar Kaike	1225	0
99	Sonaha	1182	0
100	Hayu/Vayu	1133	0
101	Kisan	1004	0
102	Punjabi	871	0
103	Dhuleli	786	0
104	Khamchi(Raute)	741	0
105	Lungkhim	702	0
106	Lowa	624	0
107	Kagate	611	0
108	Waling/Walung	545	0
109	Nar-Phu	428	0
110	Lhomi	413	0
111	Tichhurong Poike	410	0
112	Kurmali	397	0
113	Koche	332	0
114	Sindhi	291	0
115	Phangduwali	247	0
116	Belhare	177	0
117	Surel	174	0
118	Malpande	161	0
119	Khariya	132	0
120	Sadhani	122	0
121	Hariyanwi	114	0
122	Sam	106	0
123	Bankariya	86	0
124	Kusunda	23	0
125	Others	4201	0.01
126	Not stated	346	0

=== Second languages ===
There were 25 languages that were being used as second languages by more than 10 thousand population on each in the "National Report on caste/ethnicity, language & religion", National Population and Housing Census 2021 in Nepal, whereas there were only 18 such languages reported as second language in the earlier census 2011.

Population by second language and sex, NPHC 2021

Rank	Second Language	Total	Percentage
null	Total	29164578	100
1	No Second Language	14023086	48.08
2	Nepali	13482904	46.23
3	Maithili	267621	0.92
4	Hindi	223106	0.76
5	Bhojpuri	138572	0.48
6	English	102561	0.35
7	Tharu	89606	0.31
8	Bajjika	86062	0.3
9	Avadhi	75651	0.26
10	Urdu	72128	0.25
11	Tamang	71569	0.25
12	Magar Dhut	54143	0.19
13	Bhote	45292	0.16
14	Bantawa	43536	0.15
15	Nepalbhasha(Newari)	32604	0.11
16	Chamling	29253	0.1
17	Magahi	29191	0.1
18	Gurung	23698	0.08
19	Yakthung/Limbu	19705	0.07
20	Thulung	17187	0.06
21	Magar Kham	16814	0.06
22	Bahing/Bayung	15104	0.05
23	Rai	14398	0.05
24	Doteli	14344	0.05
25	Sampang	14261	0.05
26	Khaling	10370	0.04
27	Baitadeli	9521	0.03
28	Sherpa	9435	0.03
29	Sanskrit	6615	0.02
30	Achhami	6522	0.02
31	Angika	6127	0.02
32	Musalman	6084	0.02
33	Kulung	6039	0.02
34	Dumi	5870	0.02
35	Dadeldhuri	5535	0.02
36	Bangla	5447	0.02
37	Wambule	5227	0.02
38	Darchuleli	4272	0.01
39	Puma	4271	0.01
40	Rajbanshi	4103	0.01
41	Bote	3891	0.01
42	Mewahang	3669	0.01
43	Marwadi	3449	0.01
44	Nachhiring	3176	0.01
45	Tibetan	3134	0.01
46	Bajhangi	2641	0.01
47	Khash	2607	0.01
48	Chhintang	2135	0.01
49	Tilung	1762	0.01
50	Sunuwar	1597	0.01
51	Belhare	1491	0.01
52	Punjabi	1274	0
53	Dungmali	1271	0
54	Jero/Jerung	1245	0
55	Jumli	1125	0
56	Bajureli	1076	0
57	Dhimal	999	0
58	Majhi	971	0
59	Ghale	963	0
60	Koyee	928	0
61	Ranatharu	871	0
62	Thami	859	0
63	Danuwar	845	0
64	Chepang	833	0
65	Sign Language	828	0
66	Bhujel	740	0
67	Thakali	733	0
68	Yakkha	704	0
69	Santhali	703	0
70	Chhiling	685	0
71	Ganagai	644	0
72	Lohorung	622	0
73	Kumal	615	0
74	Kagate	615	0
75	Darai	591	0
76	Khamchi(Raute)	526	0
77	Magar Kaike	515	0
78	Hyolmo/Yholmo	508	0
79	Yamphu/Yamphe	494	0
80	Dailekhi	434	0
81	Chhantyal	394	0
82	Hayu/Vayu	349	0
83	Koche	335	0
84	Jirel	332	0
85	Athpahariya	320	0
86	Balkura/Baram	307	0
87	Waling/Walung	304	0
88	Manange	304	0
89	Dura	278	0
90	Uranw/Urau	245	0
91	Lapcha	242	0
92	Sindhi	217	0
93	Tajpuriya	209	0
94	Dhuleli	187	0
95	Pahari	142	0
96	Lhopa	129	0
97	Dolpali	127	0
98	Sadhani	125	0
99	Sadri	106	0
100	Baragunwa	89	0
101	Phangduwali	85	0
102	Hariyanwi	84	0
103	Sam	79	0
104	Malpande	78	0
105	Raji	76	0
106	Meche	75	0
107	Tichhurong Poike	72	0
108	Surel	64	0
109	Kurmali	60	0
110	Bankariya	42	0
111	Kewarat	38	0
112	Sonaha	35	0
113	Karmarong	34	0
114	Kisan	33	0
115	Byansi	32	0
116	Kusunda	32	0
117	Lungkhim	28	0
118	Mugali	23	0
119	Others	159	0
120	Not stated	8105	0.03

== Social status ==
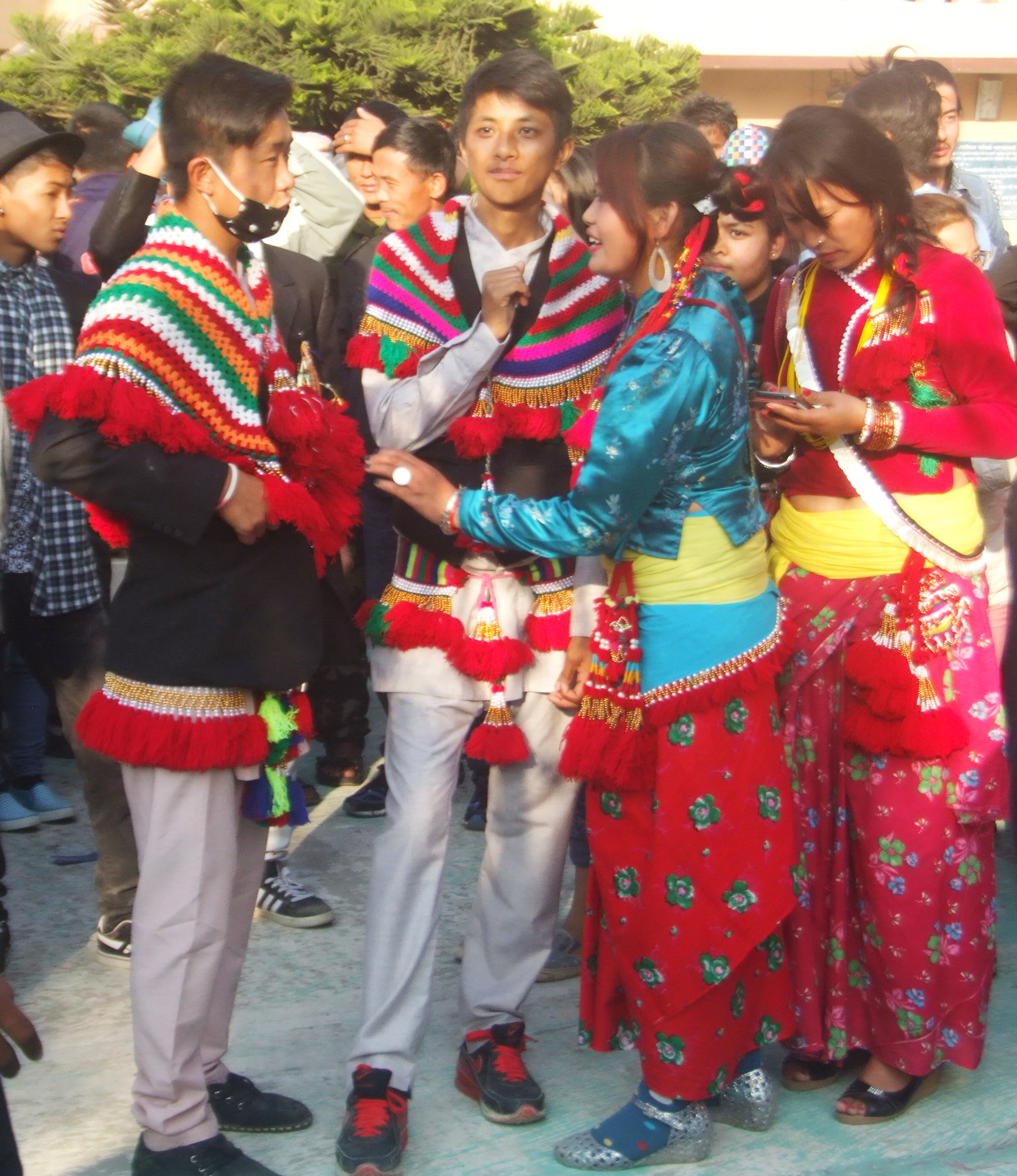
Sunuwar, a division of Kirati people; one of the largest ethnic groups in Eastern Nepal

Nepal's ethnic and caste groups have historically had varying levels of representation in governments, agriculture, trade, civil service, judiciary, and military institutions. Hill status i.e. Brahmin/Bahun and Chhetri castes dominated the civil service, the judiciary and upper ranks of the army throughout the Shah regime (1768–2008). In the Terai region, as per available studies, some Madhesi caste group have had higher representation in civil services relative to their population shares in earlier survey (pre-2015 data), such as the Kushwaha have a representation in Nepal’s civil service that is 3.2 times higher than their share of the national population, ranking as the fourth-highest representation ratio in the country and the caste with the highest ratio is the Rajput, whose civil service presence is 5.6 times their population share. Maithili Brahmins also hold a representation 4.2 times their share of the population, giving them the third-highest ratio in Nepal’s civil service. Yadav is one of the largest caste group among the Madhesi community of Nepal. Their relatively large population in certain districts has contributed to their political representation in recent decades, a notable figure like Dr. Ram Baran Yadav was a physician and served as the first President of Nepal from 23 July 2008 to 29 October 2015. Nepali was the national language where as Maithili is the second most spoken language. Caste system, prevalent among Hindus, was made illegal in 1961 by Naya Mulki Ain.

== Caste/ethnicity in Nepal by population ==
The populations of 125 Nepalese castes groups were recorded in the 2011 Nepal census. (Note: Pages 191/192 of the total pdf or pages 156/157 in the scanned material shows Nepalese castes/ethnic groups)

However, there were 146 castes/ethnicities according to the "National Report on caste/ethnicity, language & religion", National Population and Housing Census 2021 in Nepal, out of which 125 were previously reported in the earlier census 2011 and 17 were newly found in the census 2021.

The newly added castes/ethnicities were Ranatharu, Bhumihar, Bankariya, Surel, Chumba/Nubri, Phree, Mugal/Mugum, Pun, Rauniyar, Baniyan, Gondh/Gond, Karmarong, Khatik, Beldar, Chai/Khulaut, Done and Kewarat.

The Madhesi Commission also removed Muslims and Tharus from the list of Madhesi in 2021. In the surname listing of ‘Surname Enumeration of Madhesi Community in Nepal -2078 B.S.' conducted by the Madheshi Commission, Tharus in sub-group-1 and Muslims in sub-group-2 have been removed.

List of Castes/Ethnicities by population in Nepal- NPHC 2021

Rank	Caste/ethnicity	Total	Total %
	Total	29164578	100
1	Chettri	4796995	16.45
2	Brahman - Hill	3292373	11.29
3	Magar	2013498	6.9
4	Tharu	1807124	6.2
5	Tamang	1639866	5.62
6	Bishwokarma	1470010	5.04
7	Musalman	1418677	4.86
8	Newa: (Newar)	1341363	4.6
9	Yadav	1228581	4.21
10	Rai	640674	2.2
11	Pariyar	565932	1.94
12	Gurung	543790	1.86
13	Thakuri	494470	1.7
14	Mijar	452229	1.55
15	Teli	431347	1.48
16	Yakthung/Limbu	414704	1.42
17	Chamar/Harijan/Ram	393255	1.35
18	Kushwaha	355707	1.22
19	Kurmi	277786	0.95
20	Musahar	264974	0.91
21	Dhanuk	252105	0.86
22	Dusadh/Pasawan/Pasi	250977	0.86
23	Brahman - Tarai	217774	0.75
24	Mallaha	207006	0.71
25	Sanyasi/Dasnami	198849	0.68
26	Kewat	184298	0.63
27	Kanu	152868	0.52
28	Hajam/Thakur	136487	0.47
29	Kalwar	134914	0.46
30	Rajbansi	132564	0.45
31	Sherpa	130637	0.45
32	Kumal	129702	0.44
33	Tatma/Tatwa	126018	0.43
34	Khatwe	124062	0.43
35	Gharti/Bhujel	120245	0.41
36	Majhi	111352	0.38
37	Nuniya	108723	0.37
38	Sundi	107380	0.37
39	Dhobi	101089	0.35
40	Lohar	100680	0.35
41	Bin	96974	0.33
42	Kumhar	95724	0.33
43	Sonar	93380	0.32
44	Chepang/Praja	84364	0.29
45	Ranatharu	83308	0.29
46	Danuwar	82784	0.28
47	Sunuwar	78910	0.27
48	Haluwai	71796	0.25
49	Baraee	68011	0.23
50	Bantar/Sardar	61687	0.21
51	Kahar	59882	0.21
52	Santhal	57310	0.2
53	Baniyan	53655	0.18
54	Kathabaniyan	52466	0.18
55	Badhaee/Badhee	52437	0.18
56	Oraon/Kudukh	46840	0.16
57	Rajput	46577	0.16
58	Amat	46471	0.16
59	Gangai	41446	0.14
60	Lodh	39872	0.14
61	Gaderi/Bhediyar	35497	0.12
62	Ghale	35434	0.12
63	Marwadi	33803	0.12
64	Kayastha	33502	0.11
65	Kulung	33388	0.11
66	Thami	32743	0.11
67	Bhumihar	32199	0.11
68	Rajbhar	29240	0.1
69	Rauniyar	27258	0.09
70	Dhimal	25643	0.09
71	Khawas	22551	0.08
72	Tajpuriya	20989	0.07
73	Kori	20670	0.07
74	Dom	19901	0.07
75	Mali	19605	0.07
76	Darai	18695	0.06
77	Yakkha	17460	0.06
78	Bhote	15818	0.05
79	Bantawa	15719	0.05
80	Rajdhob	15391	0.05
81	Dhunia	15033	0.05
82	Pahari	15015	0.05
83	Bangali	13800	0.05
84	Gondh/Gond	12267	0.04
85	Chamling	12178	0.04
86	Chhantyal/Chhantel	11963	0.04
87	Thakali	11741	0.04
88	Badi	11470	0.04
89	Bote	11258	0.04
90	Hyolmo/Yholmopa	9819	0.03
91	Khatik	9152	0.03
92	Yamphu	9111	0.03
93	Kewarat	8809	0.03
94	Baram / Baramu	7859	0.03
95	Dev	7418	0.03
96	Nachhiring	7300	0.03
97	Gaine	6971	0.02
98	Bahing	6547	0.02
99	Thulung	6239	0.02
100	Jirel	6031	0.02
101	Khaling	5889	0.02
102	Aathpahariya	5878	0.02
103	Dolpo	5818	0.02
104	Sarbaria	5793	0.02
105	Mewahang	5727	0.02
106	Byasi/Sauka	5718	0.02
107	Dura	5581	0.02
108	Meche	5193	0.02
109	Raji	5125	0.02
110	Sampang	4841	0.02
111	Chai/Khulaut	4805	0.02
112	Chumba/Nubri	4414	0.02
114	Dhankar/ Dharikar	4090	0.01
114	Munda	3589	0.01
115	Lepcha	3578	0.01
116	Patharkatt / Kushwadiya	3343	0.01
117	Hayu	3069	0.01
118	Beldar	3037	0.01
119	Halkhor	2929	0.01
120	Natuwa	2896	0.01
121	Loharung	2598	0.01
122	Kamar	2532	0.01
123	Dhandi	2339	0.01
124	Done	2125	0.01
125	Mugal/Mugum	2124	0.01
126	Punjabi/Sikh	1846	0.01
127	Karmarong	1663	0.01
128	Chidimar	1615	0.01
129	Kisan	1479	0.01
130	Lhopa	1390	0
131	Kalar	931	0
132	Phree	921	0
133	Koche	847	0
134	Topkegola	642	0
135	Raute(umesh)	566	0
136	Walung	481	0
137	Lhomi	355	0
138	Surel	318	0
139	Kusunda	253	0
140	Bankariya	180	0
141	Nurang	36	0
null	Others	5888	0.02
null	Foreigner	137407	0.47
null	Not stated	4436	0.02

List of Castes/Ethnicities by population in Nepal-2011

Rank	Caste/Ethnicity	Population (2011)	Percentage (%)
1	Chetri	4398053	16.60
2	Bahun	3226903	12.18
3	Magar	1887733	7.12
4	Tharu	1737470	6.56
5	Tamang	1539830	5.81
6	Newar	1321933	4.99
7	Kami	1258554	4.75
8	Nepali Musalman	1164255	4.39
9	Yadav	1054458	3.98
10	Rai	620004	2.34
11	Gurung	522641	1.97
12	Damai/Dholi	472862	1.78
13	Thakuri	425623	1.61
14	Limbu	387300	1.46
15	Sarki	374816	1.41
16	Teli	369688	1.40
17	Chamar/Harijan/Ram	335893	1.27
18	Kushwaha	306393	1.16
19	Musahar	234490	0.89
20	Kurmi	231129	0.87
21	Sanyasi/Dasnami	227822	0.86
22	Dhanuk	219808	0.83
23	Kanu/Haluwai	209053	0.79
24	Dusadh/Pasawan/Pasi	208910	0.79
25	Mallaha	173261	0.65
26	Kewat	153772	0.58
27	Kathbaniya	138637	0.52
28	Brahmin-Terai	134106	0.51
29	Kalwar	128232	0.48
30	Kumal	121196	0.45
31	Bhujel	118650	0.44
32	Hajam/Thakur	117758	0.43
33	Rajbanshi	115242	0.43
34	Sherpa	112946	0.41
35	Dhobi	109079	0.40
36	Tatma/Tatwa	104865	0.38
37	Lohar	101421	0.38
38	Khatwe	100921	0.35
39	Sudhi	93115	0.32
40	Danuwar	84115	0.32
41	Majhi	83727	0.30
42	Barai	80597	0.28
43	Bin	75195	0.27
44	Nuniya	70540	0.26
45	Chepang	68399	0.24
46	Sonar	64335	0.24
47	Kumhar	62399	0.21
48	Sunuwar	55712	0.21
49	Bantar/Sardar	55104	0.21
50	Kahar	53159	0.20
51	Santhal	51735	0.20
52	Marwadi	51443	0.19
53	Kayastha	44304	0.17
54	Rajput/Terai Kshetriya	41972	0.16
55	Badi	38603	0.15
56	Jhangar/Uraon	37424	0.14
57	Gangai (Ganesh & Mandal)	36988	0.12
58	Lodh	32837	0.11
59	Badhaee	28932	0.11
60	Thami	28671	0.11
61	Kulung	28613	0.1
62	Bengali	26582	0.1
63	Gaderi/Bhediyar/Gangajali	26375	0.1
64	Dhimal	26298	0.09
65	Yakkha	24336	0.09
66	Ghale	22881	0.07
67	Tajpuriya	19213	0.07
68	Khawas	18513	0.06
69	Darai	16789	0.06
70	Mali	14995	0.06
71	Dhuniya	14846	0.05
72	Pahari	13615	0.05
73	Rajdhob	13422	0.05
74	Bhote	13397	0.05
75	Dom	13268	0.05
76	Thakali	13215	0.05
77	Kori	12276	0.04
78	Chhantyal	11810	0.04
79	Hyolmo	10752	0.04
80	Bote	10397	0.04
81	Rajbhar	9542	0.03
82	Brahmu/Baramo	8140	0.03
83	Punjabi	7176	0.03
84	Nachhring	7154	0.03
85	Yamphu	6933	0.03
86	Gaine	6791	0.03
87	Chamling	6668	0.02
88	Athpahariya	5977	0.02
89	Jirel	5774	0.02
90	Dura	5394	0.02
91	Sarabaria	4906	0.02
92	Meche	4867	0.02
93	Bantawa	4604	0.02
94	Raji	4235	0.02
95	Dolpo	4107	0.02
96	Halkhor	4003	0.01
97	Byansi/Sauka	3895	0.01
98	Amat	3830	0.01
99	Thulung	3535	0.01
100	Lepcha	3445	0.01
101	Patharkatt /Kushwadiya	3182	0.01
102	Mewahang	3100	0.01
103	Bahing	3096	0.01
104	Natuwa	3062	0.01
105	Hayu	2925	0.01
106	Dhankar/Dharikar	2681	0.01
107	Lhopa	2624	0.01
108	Munda	2350	0.0087
109	Dev	2147	0.0081
110	Dhandi	1982	0.0075
111	Kamar	1787	0.0067
112	Kisan	1739	0.0066
113	Sampang	1681	0.0063
114	Koche	1635	0.0062
115	Lhomi	1614	0.0061
116	Khaling	1571	0.0059
117	Topkegola	1523	0.0057
118	Chidimar	1254	0.0047
119	Walung	1249	0.0047
120	Lohorung	1153	0.0044
121	Kalar	1077	0.004
122	Raute	618	0.002
123	Nurang	278	0.001
124	Kusunda	273	0.001
125	Foreigners	6651	0.03
−126	Others/Undefined	275670	1.04%
Total	Total	26494504	100.00%

== Religion ==
According to "National Report on caste/ethnicity, language & religion", National Population and Housing Census 2021 the number of religions adopted by the individuals in census 2021 and 2011 were as follows:

	Census 2021			Census 2011	
Religion	Population	Percent	Religion	Population	Percent
Hindu	23677744	81.19	Hindu	21551492	81.34
Bouddha	2393549	8.21	Bouddha	2396099	9.04
Islam	1483066	5.09	Islam	1162370	4.39
Kirat	924204	3.17	Kirat	807169	3.05
Christian	512313	1.76	Christian	375699	1.42
Prakrit	102048	0.35	Prakriti	121982	0.46
Bon	67223	0.23	Bon	13006	0.05
Jain	2398	0.01	Jain	3214	0.01
Bahai	537	0.00	Bahai	1283	0.00
Sikha	1496	0.01	Sikha	609	0.00
Unidentified	-	-	Unidentified	61581	0.23
Total	29164578	100	Total	26494504	100
