= 2nd Bagmati Provincial Assembly =

2022 legislative term in Nepal

←	1st Assembly

Overview
- Legislative body: Bagmati Provincial Assembly
- Jurisdiction: Bagmati Province, Nepal
- Meeting place: Regional Educational Directorate, Hetauda, Makwanpur District
- Term: 2 January 2023 –
- Election: 2022 provincial elections
- Government: Jamkattel, 2023; Lama cabinet, 2024
- Website: pradeshsabha.p3.gov.np

Provincial Assembly
- Members: 110
- Speaker: Bhuwan Kumar Pathak (RPP)
- Deputy Speaker: Apsara Chapagain (CPN (UML))
- Leader of the House: Shalikram Jamkattel (CPN (MC)); Bahadur Singh Lama (NC)
- Leader of the Opposition: Bahadur Singh Lama (NC); Jagannath Thapaliya (CPN (UML)); Shalikram Jamkattel (CPN (MC))
- Party control: Government (61): Congress: 36; CPN (UML): 25; Opposition (43): NCP: 26; RPP: 12; NMKP: 3; Hamro Nepali: 2; Vacant (6)

The second Bagmati Provincial Assembly was elected by the 2022 provincial elections on 20 November 2022. 110 members were elected to the assembly, 66 of whom were elected through direct elections and 44 of whom were elected through the party list proportional representation system. The first session on the assembly commenced from 2 January 2023.

== Leaders ==
=== Officers ===
- Speaker of the Assembly: Hon. Bhuwan Kumar Pathak (Rastriya Prajatantra Party)
- Deputy Speaker of the Assembly: Hon. Apsara Chapagai Khatri (CPN (UML))
- Leader of the House (Chief Minister) : Hon. Shalikram Jamkattel (CPN (Maoist Centre))
- Leader of the Opposition: Hon. Bahadur Singh Lama (Nepali Congress)

=== Parliamentary party ===
- Parliamentary party leader of Nepali Congress: Hon. Bahadur Singh Lama
- Parliamentary party leader of CPN (UML): Hon. Jagannath Thapaliya
- Parliamentary party leader of CPN (Maoist Centre): Hon. Shalikram Jamkattel
- Parliamentary party leader of Rastriya Prajatantra Party: Hon. Udhhav Thapa
- Parliamentary party leader of Nepal Majdoor Kisan Party: Hon. Surendra Raj Gosai
- Parliamentary party leader of Hamro Nepali Party: Hon. Shailendra Man Bajracharya

=== Whip ===
- Chief Whip of Nepali Congress: Hon. Govinda Lamsal

== Composition ==

Party	Seats					
Party	After election			At present		
Party	FPTP	PR	Total	FPTP	PR	Total
Nepali Congress	25	12	37	24	12	36
Nepali Communist Party	—	—	—	17	9	26
CPN (UML)	13	14	27	11	14	25
Rastriya Prajatantra Party	7	6	13	6	6	12
Nepal Workers Peasants Party	1	2	3	1	2	3
HNP	1	1	2	1	1	2
Vacant	—	—	—	6	0	6
Former Parties
Maoist Centre	14	7	21	14	7	21
Unified Socialist	5	2	7	5	2	7
Total	66	44	110	66	44	110

== Members ==
Nepali Congress (36)
Constituency/PR group	Member	Portfolio & Responsibilities
Nuwakot 2 (B)	Bahadur Singh Lama	Parliamentary party leader; Minister for Economic Affairs
Kavrepalanchok 1 (B)	Tirtha Bahadur Lama	Minister for Drinking Water, Energy and Irrigation
Kathmandu 10 (A)	Pukar Maharjan	Minister for Culture, Tourism and Cooperatives
Lalitpur 2 (B)	Ramkrishna Chitrakar	Minister for Industry, Commerce, Land and General Administration
Chitwan 2 (B)	Uttam Joshi	Minister for Health
Sindhupalchok 1 (A)	Masina Khadka	Minister for Forest and Environment
Sindhuli 1 (B)	Ram Kumar Pahadi	
Sindhuli 2 (A)	Chhetra Bahadur Bomjan	
Rasuwa 1 (A)	Prabhat Tamang	
Dhading 1 (A)	Madu Kumar Shrestha	
Dhading 2 (A)	Gobinda Lamsal	
Nuwakot 1 (B)	Ramesh Kumar Mahat	
Kathmandu 1 (A)	Dipendra Shrestha	
Kathmandu 1 (B)	Suraj Chandra Lamichhane	
Kathmandu 3 (A)	Tshering Dorje Lama	
Kathmandu 3 (B)	Bimal Thakuri	
Kathmandu 4 (A)	Shreeram Lamichhane	
Kathmandu 5 (B)	Shyam Bahadur Khadka	
Kathmandu 6 (A)	Hariprabha Khadgi	
Bhaktapur 1 (A)	Suresh Shrestha	
Lalitpur 1 (B)	Min Krishna Maharjan	
Kavrepalanchok 2 (B)	Kanchan Chandra Bade	
Sindhupalchok 2 (B)	Krishna Kumar Tamang	
Makwanpur 2 (B)	Indra Bahadur Baniya	
Indigenous peoples	Samita Khadgi	
Indigenous peoples	Laxmi Devi Shrestha	
Indigenous peoples	Geeta Gurung	
Indigenous peoples	Yamuna Devi Shrestha	
Indigenous peoples, Sherpa	Yangkila Sherpa	
Indigenous peoples	Maya Shrestha	
Khas Arya	Shivraj Adhikari	
Khas Arya	Urmila Nepal	
Khas Arya	Mina Parajuli	
Khas Arya	Shanta Dhakal	
Khas Arya	Binu Rayamajhi Poudel	
Dalit	Suna Pariyar	
Former Members
Dolakha 1 (A)	Kundan Raj Kafle	

Nepali Communist Party (28)
Constituency/PR group	Member	Portfolio & Responsibilities
Dhading 1 (B)	Shalikram Jamkattel (Note: Elected from Maoist Centre)	Chief Minister of Bagmati Province; Parliamentary party leader
Sindhuli 2 (B)	Ganga Narayan Shrestha	Minister for Internal Affairs and Law
Makwanpur 2 (A)	Kumari Muktan	Minister for Social Development
Ramechhap 1 (A)	Tara Narayan Shrestha	
Ramechhap 1 (B)	Yubaraj Chaulagai	
Sindhuli 1 (A)	Matrika Prasad Bhattarai	
Rasuwa 1 (B)	Indra Prasad Gotame	
Nuwakot 1 (A)	Radhika Tamang	
Nuwakot 2 (A)	Ram Prasad Dhungana	
Kavrepalanchok 1 (A)	Ratna Prasad Dhakal	
Sindhupalchok 1 (B)	Saral Sahayatri Paudel	
Makwanpur 1 (A)	Prem Bahadur Pulami	
Chitwan 3 (B)	Thakur Prasad Dhakal	
Chitwan 1 (B)	Krishna Prasad Sharma Khanal (Note: Elected from CPN (Unified Socialist))	
Kavrepalanchok 2 (A)	Laxman Lamsal	
Bhaktapur 2 (B)	Rajendra Man Shrestha	
Kathmandu 10 (B)	Rama Ale Magar	
Indigenous peoples	Devendra Shrestha	
Indigenous peoples	Urmila Kumari	
Indigenous peoples	Bhuwan Kishori Shrestha	
Indigenous peoples, Danuwar	Shuspa Bhujel Neupane	
Khas Arya	Ishwar Sapkota	
Khas Arya	Amrita Nepal	
Khas Arya	Ruku Chaulagai	
Indigenous peoples	Om Kumari Shrestha	
Khas Arya	Maya Devi Sharma	
Former Members
Kathmandu 7 (A)	Basanta Prasad Manandhar	
Sindhupalchok 2 (A)	Yubaraj Dulal[./2nd_Bagmati_Provincial_Assembly#cite_note-NCP-Mao-15 [a]]	Minister for Physical Infrastructure Development

CPN (UML) (27)
Constituency/PR group	Member	Portfolio & Responsibilities
Khas Arya	Apsara Chapagai Khatri	Deputy Speaker of the Assembly
Chitwan 1 (A)	Jagannath Thapaliya	Parliamentary party leader
Makwanpur 1 (B)	Ekalal Shrestha	
Lalitpur 2 (A)	Rameshwar Shrestha	
Kathmandu 9 (B)	Keshav Prasad Pokharel	
Dolakha 1 (B)	Bharat Bahadur K.C.	
Kathmandu 4 (B)	Jayaram Thapa	
Bhaktapur 2 (A)	Kiran Thapamagar	
Lalitpur 1 (A)	Madhusudan Paudel	
Lalitpur 3 (A)	Raghunath Maharjan	
Lalitpur 3 (B)	Prem Bhakta Maharjan	
Chitwan 2 (A)	Krishna Prasad Silwal	
Indigenous peoples	Anand Kumar Shrestha	
Indigenous peoples	Gyan Bahadur Tamang	
Indigenous peoples	Thula Thami	
Indigenous peoples	Bindu Shrestha	
Indigenous peoples	Maili Tamang	
Indigenous peoples	Shuk Maya Tamang	
Indigenous peoples	Sakuntala Shrestha	
Indigenous peoples, Sunuwar	Urmila Sunuwar	
Khas Arya	Dinesh Chandra Devkota	
Khas Arya	Hari Prasad Sapkota	
Khas Arya	Bharati Kumari Pathak	
Khas Arya	Maya Kumari Karki	
Dalit	Bal Kumari Bishwakarma	
Former Members
Kathmandu 7 (B)	Prakash Shrestha	
Kathmandu 6 (B)	Aman Kumar Maskey	

Rastriya Prajatantra Party (13)
Constituency/PR group	Member	Portfolio & Responsibilities
Khas Arya	Bhuwan Kumar Pathak	Speaker of the Provincial Assembly
Kathmandu 8 (B)	Udhhav Thapa	Parliamentary party leader
Dhading 2 (B)	Damdar Tamang	
Kathmandu 2 (B)	Raju Bista	
Kathmandu 5 (A)	Rajendra Prajapati	
Kathmandu 9 (A)	Nuraj Bajracharya	
Chitwan 3 (A)	Gir Bahadur Tamang	
Indigenous peoples	Kumari Tamang	
Indigenous peoples	Aasha Lama	
Indigenous peoples	Dhaneshwari Prajapati	
Indigenous peoples	Monika Shrestha	
Khas Arya	Laxmi Ghimire	
Former Members
Kathmandu 2 (A)	Sunil K.C.	

Nepal Majdoor Kisan Party (3)
Constituency/PR group	Member	Portfolio & Responsibilities
Bhaktapur 1 (B)	Surendra Raj Gosai	Parliamentary party leader
Indigenous peoples	Srijana Sayaju	
Khas Arya	Gita Kafle	

Hamro Nepali Party (2)
Constituency/PR group	Member	Portfolio & Responsibilities
Kathmandu 8 (A)	Shailendra Man Bajracharya	Parliamentary party leader
Indigenous peoples	Sarita Khadgi	

=== Changes ===
Constituency/PR group	MPA	Party	Date seat vacated	Cause of vacation	New MPA	Party
Dolakha 1 (A)	Kundan Raj Kafle	Congress	19 January 2026	Resigned to contest general election		
Kathmandu 2 (A)	Sunil K.C.	RPP	19 January 2026	Resigned to contest general election		
Kathmandu 7 (A)	Basanta Prasad Manandhar	NCP	19 January 2026	Resigned to contest general election		
Sindhupalchok 2 (A)	Yubaraj Dulal	NCP	19 January 2026	Resigned to contest general election		
Kathmandu 6 (B)	Aman Kumar Maskey	CPN (UML)	19 January 2026	Resigned to contest general election		
Kathmandu 7 (B)	Prakash Shrestha	CPN (UML)	19 January 2026	Resigned to contest general election		

== See also ==
- Bagmati Province
