= Indra Bahadur Baniya cabinet =

- 6th Cabinet of Bagmati Province
- Date formed: 5 August 2025
- Date dissolved: 17 August 2026

People and organisations
- Governor: Deepak Prakash Devkota
- Chief Minister: Indra Bahadur Baniya
- No. of ministers: 8
- Ministers removed: 6 resigned
- Total no. of members: 8
- Member party: Nepali Congress Coalition partners: HNP (Note: In government from 4 August 2026.) Former Members: CPN (UML) (Note: In government until 5 August 2025 and from 26 July 2026)
- Status in legislature: Minority government in Provincial Assembly 39 / 110 (35%)
- Opposition party: CPN (UML); Nepali Communist Party
- Opposition leader: Shalikram Jamkattel

History
- Election: 2022
- Legislature term: 5 years
- Predecessor: Bahadur Singh Lama cabinet
- Successor: Kiran ThapaMagar cabinet

The Indra Bahadur Baniya cabinet is the sixth Council of Ministers of Bagmati Province. It was formed on 5 August 2025 after Indra Bahadur Baniya of the Nepali Congress was appointed Chief Minister with the support of the Nepali Congress-CPN (UML) coalition. The cabinet succeeded the Bahadur Singh Lama cabinet following a leadership change within the Nepali Congress provincial parliamentary party, in which Baniya defeated incumbent Chief Minister Bahadur Singh Lama and subsequently secured majority support in the Provincial Assembly. On 22 July 2026, the CPN (UML) withdrew its support to the government and all six UML ministers resigned following the collapse of the Nepali Congress–UML coalition. As a result, the Baniya cabinet became a minority government. On 4 August, Baniya inducted Shailendra Man Bajracharya, parliamentary party leader of the Hamro Nepali Party, into the cabinet as Minister for Physical Infrastructure Development in an effort to bolster support for his minority government. Baniya was scheduled to seek a vote of confidence in the Provincial Assembly on 17 August 2026 but resigned as Chief Minister before the vote took place, after failing to secure sufficient support to remain in office.

== Ministers by party ==
Party	Cabinet Ministers	Ministers of State	Total Ministers
Nepali Congress	7	0	7
Hamro Nepali Party	1	0	1

== Final composition of the Council of Ministers ==
=== With Hamro Nepali Party as coalition Partner ===
S.N.	Portfolio	Minister responsible	Political Party	Constituency	Tenure		
Cabinet ministers
1	Chief Minister	Indra Bahadur Baniya	Nepali Congress	Makwanpur 1 (B)	5 August 2025	17 August 2026	1 year, 12 days
2	Minister for Internal Affairs, Law and Cooperatives	Shivraj Adhikari	Nepali Congress	PR List	5 August 2025	17 August 2026	1 year, 12 days
3	Minister for Agriculture, Livestock, Forests and Environment	Urmila Nepal	Nepali Congress	Lalitpur 1 (B)	15 August 2025	17 August 2026	1 year, 2 days
4	Minister for Health and Social Development	Kanchan Chandra Bade	Nepali Congress	Kavre 2 (B)	15 August 2025	17 August 2026	1 year, 2 days
5	Minister for Economic Affairs and Planning	Prabhat Kumar Tamang	Nepali Congress	Rasuwa 1 (A)	15 August 2025	17 August 2026	1 year, 2 days
6	Minister for Industry, Tourism, Labour and Transport	Suresh Shrestha	Nepali Congress	Bhaktapur 1 (A)	15 August 2025	17 August 2026	1 year, 2 days
7	Minister for Drinking Water, Energy and Irrigation	Krishna Kumar Tamang	Nepali Congress	Sindhupalchok 2 (B)	5 August 2025	17 August 2026	1 year, 12 days
8	Minister for Physical Infrastructure Development	Shailendra Man Bajracharya	Hamro Nepali Party	Kathmandu 8 (A)	4 August 2026	17 August 2026	13 days

=== Until 4 August 2026 ===
S.N.	Portfolio	Minister responsible	Political Party	Constituency	Tenure		
Cabinet ministers
1	Chief Minister	Indra Bahadur Baniya	Nepali Congress	Makwanpur 1 (B)	5 August 2025	17 August 2026	1 year, 12 days
2	Minister for Internal Affairs, Law and Cooperatives	Shivraj Adhikari	Nepali Congress	PR List	5 August 2025	17 August 2026	1 year, 12 days
3	Minister for Agriculture, Livestock, Forests and Environment	Urmila Nepal	Nepali Congress	Lalitpur 1 (B)	15 August 2025	17 August 2026	1 year, 2 days
4	Minister for Health and Social Development	Kanchan Chandra Bade	Nepali Congress	Kavre 2 (B)	15 August 2025	17 August 2026	1 year, 2 days
5	Minister for Economic Affairs and Planning	Prabhat Kumar Tamang	Nepali Congress	Rasuwa 1 (A)	15 August 2025	17 August 2026	1 year, 2 days
6	Minister for Industry, Tourism, Labour and Transport	Suresh Shrestha	Nepali Congress	Bhaktapur 1 (A)	15 August 2025	17 August 2026	1 year, 2 days
7	Minister for Drinking Water, Energy and Irrigation	Krishna Kumar Tamang	Nepali Congress	Sindhupalchok 2 (B)	5 August 2025	17 August 2026	1 year, 12 days
8	Minister for Physical Infrastructure Development	Binu Rayamajhi Poudel	Nepali Congress	Party list (Khas Arya - Women)	15 August 2025	4 August 2026	354 days

=== With CPN (UML) as major Partner ===
S.N.	Portfolio	Minister responsible	Political Party	Constituency	Tenure		
Cabinet ministers
1	Chief Minister	Indra Bahadur Baniya	Nepali Congress	Makwanpur 1 (B)	5 August 2025	17 August 2026	1 year, 12 days
2	Minister for Agriculture and Livestock Development	Madhusudan Paudel	CPN (UML)	Kathmandu 1 (A)	5 August 2025	26 July 2026	351 days
3	Minister for Internal Affairs and Law	Shivraj Adhikari	Nepali Congress	PR List	5 August 2025	17 August 2026	1 year, 12 days
4	Minister for Health	Kiran Thapa Magar	CPN (UML)	Bhaktapur 2 (A)	5 August 2025	26 July 2026	351 days
5	Minister for Youth and Sports	Urmila Nepal	Nepali Congress	Lalitpur 1 (B)	15 August 2025	17 August 2026	1 year, 2 days
6	Minister for Social Development	Kanchan Chandra Bade	Nepali Congress	Kavre 2 (B)	15 August 2025	17 August 2026	1 year, 2 days
7	Minister for Physical Infrastructure Development	Dinesh Chandra Devkota	CPN (UML)	Party list (Khas Arya)	5 August 2025	26 July 2026	351 days
8	Minister for Economic Affairs and Planning	Prabhat Kumar Tamang	Nepali Congress	Rasuwa 1 (A)	15 August 2025	17 August 2026	1 year, 2 days
9	Minister for Forest and Environment	Bharat Bahadur K.C.	CPN (UML)	Dolakha 1 (B)	5 August 2025	26 July 2026	351 days
10	Minister for Culture and Tourism	Suresh Shrestha	Nepali Congress	Bhaktapur 1 (A)	15 August 2025	17 August 2026	1 year, 2 days
11	Minister for Labour, Employment and Transportation	Jayaram Thapa	CPN (UML)	Kathmandu 4 (B)	5 August 2025	26 July 2026	351 days
12	Minister for Drinking Water, Energy and Irrigation	Krishna Kumar Tamang	Nepali Congress	Sindhupalchok 2 (B)	5 August 2025	17 August 2026	1 year, 12 days
13	Minister for Industry, Commerce, Land and Administration	Bindu Shrestha	CPN (UML)	Party list (Indigenous)	5 August 2025	26 July 2026	351 days
14	Minister for Cooperatives and Poverty Alleviation	Binu Rayamajhi Poudel	Nepali Congress	Party list (Khas Arya - Women)	15 August 2025	4 August 2026	354 days
