= Kavrepalanchok 1 =

Parliamentary constituency in Bagmati Province, Nepal

- Parliamentary constituency
- Kavrepalanchok 1 in Bagmati Province
- Province: Bagamati
- District: Kavrepalanchok District
- Population: 157,053
- Electorate: 161,100
- Major settlements: Panauti; Namo Buddha

Current constituency
- Created: 1991
- Seats: 1
- Party: RSP
- Member of Parliament: Madhu Kumar Chaulagain
- Local levels: Khanikhola Rural Municipality; Mahabharat Rural Municipality; Roshi Rural Municipality; Temal Rural Municipality; Chaurideurali Rural Municipality; Namobuddha Municipality; Dhulikhel Municipality (part); Panauti Municipality (part)
- Member of the Provincial Assembly 1(A): Ratna Prasad Dhakal, NCP
- Member of the Provincial Assembly 1(B): Tirtha Bahadur Lama, Congress

Kavrepalanchok 1 is one of two parliamentary constituencies of Kavrepalanchok District in Nepal. This constituency came into existence on the Constituency Delimitation Commission (CDC) report submitted on 31 August 2017.

== Incorporated areas ==
Kavrepalanchok 1 parliamentary constituency incorporates Khanikhola Rural Municipality, Mahabharat Rural Municipality, Roshi Rural Municipality, Temal Rural Municipality, Chaurideurali Rural Municipality, Namobuddha Municipality, wards 8–12 of Dhulikhel Municipality and wards 4–10 of Panauti Municipality.

== Assembly segments ==
It encompasses the following Bagmati Provincial Assembly segment

- Kavrepalanchok 1(A)
- Kavrepalanchok 1(B)

== Members of Parliament ==
=== Parliament/Constituent Assembly ===
Election	Member	Party
1991	Kaman Singh Lama	Samyukta Jana Morcha Nepal
1994	Shiva Bahadur Deuja	CPN (Unified Marxist–Leninist)
1999	Shiva Bahadur Deuja	CPN (Unified Marxist–Leninist)
2008	Surya Man Dong Tamang	CPN (Maoist)
January 2009	Surya Man Dong Tamang	UCPN (Maoist)
2013	Tirtha Bahadur Lama	Nepali Congress
2017	Ganga Bahadur Tamang	CPN (Maoist Centre)
May 2018	Ganga Bahadur Tamang	Nepal Communist Party
March 2021	Ganga Bahadur Tamang	CPN (Maoist Centre)
2022	Surya Man Dong Tamang	CPN (Maoist Centre)
November 2025	Surya Man Dong Tamang	Nepali Communist Party
2026	Madhu Kumar Chaulagain	Rastriya Swatantra Party

3 Times	2 Times	1 Time	1 Time	1 Time
CPN (Maoist)	CPN (UML)	Congress	RSP	Jana Morcha

=== Provincial Assembly ===
==== 1(A) ====
Election	Member	Party
2017	Ratna Prasad Dhakal	CPN (Maoist Centre)
May 2018	Ratna Prasad Dhakal	Nepal Communist Party
2022	Ratna Prasad Dhakal	CPN (Maoist Centre)
November 2025	Ratna Prasad Dhakal	Nepali Communist Party

==== 1(B) ====
Election	Member	Party
2017	Chandra Bahadur Lama	CPN (Unified Marxist–Leninist)
May 2018	Chandra Bahadur Lama	Nepal Communist Party
2022	Tirtha Bahadur Lama	Nepali Congress

== Election results ==
=== Election in the 2020s ===
==== 2026 general election ====
Candidate	Party	Votes	%	+/–
Madhu Kumar Chaulagain	Rastriya Swatantra Party	29,618	34.39	+23.39
Gunaraj Moktan	Nepali Congress	19,166	22.25	^
Dina Nath Gautam	Nepali Communist Party	14,184	16.47	New
Ami Tamang	CPN (UML)	13,814	16.04	-22.61
Yogendra Lama	Ujyaalo Nepal Party	7,403	8.60	New
Nabaraj Satyal	Rastriya Prajatantra Party	699	0.81	-1.53
Dhiraj Lama	Shram Sanskriti Party	287	0.33	New
Rajesh Kumar Shrestha	Independent	169	0.20	−
Kamal Bahadur Lama (Tamang)	Mongol National Organisation	156	0.18	-0.27
Kanchha Tamang	Nepal Communist Party (Maoist)	149	0.17	New
Ratna Lama	Sainyukta Nagarik Party	114	0.13	New
Jeevan Lama	Independent	94	0.11	-
Man Bahadur Tamang	Janata Samjbadi Party-Nepal	71	0.08	New
Gyanendra Kumar Shrestha	Pragatisheel Loktantrik Party	56	0.07	New
Raju Tamang	Nepal Workers Peasants Party	52	0.06	-0.06
Binod Lama	Samabeshi Samajbadi Party	50	0.06	New
Bharat Tamang	National Republic Nepal Party	35	0.04	New
Yubraj Chaulagain	Independent	7	0.01	-
Total		86,124	100.00	–
Valid votes		86,124	94.54	
Invalid/blank votes		4,977	5.46	
Total votes		91,101	100.00	
Registered voters/turnout		161,100	56.55	
Majority		10,452		
Rastriya Swatantra Party gain				

Total Voters: 1,61,100 · Votes Cast: 91,101 (56.55%) · Valid Votes: 86,124 (94.54%) · Invalid Votes: 4,977 (5.46%)

- ^ Nepali Congress did not field a candidate in Kavre-1 in 2022 and instead supported the CPN (Maoist Centre)’s candidate as part of their electoral alliance.

==== 2022 general election ====
Candidate	Party	Votes	%
Surya Man Dong Tamang	CPN (Maoist Centre)	34,512	43.66
Resham Bahadur Lama	CPN (UML)	30,548	38.65
Basu Narayan Shrestha	Rastriya Swatantra Party	8,697	11.00
Purna Bahadur Biswakarma	Rastriya Prajatantra Party	1,853	2.34
Ganesh Kumar Kapali	CPN (Marxist–Leninist)	1,127	1.43
Kamal Bahadur Lama (Tamang)	Mongol National Organisation	357	0.45
Dhan Bahadur Tamang	Janata Samajwadi Party Nepal	350	0.44
Purna Singh Tamang	Nepal Workers and Peasants Party	94	0.12
Prakash Lama	Democratic Socialist Party, Nepal	46	0.06
Prashant KC (Timalsina)	Communist Party of Nepal (Maoist Socialist)	101	0.13
Govindraj Giri	Rastriya Prajatantra Party Nepal	85	0.11
Jogman Lama	Communist Party of Nepal (Unified)	278	0.35
Jeet Bahadur Moktan	Independent	184	0.23
Madhav Prasad Kandel	Independent	33	0.04
Rukmini Shrestha	Independent	483	0.61
Gyanendra Kumar Tamang	Independent	239	0.30
Rajan Ghorasaini	Independent	59	0.07
Total		79,046	100.00
Valid votes		79,046	95.21
Invalid/blank votes		3,977	4.79
Total votes		83,023	100.00
Registered voters/turnout		161,065	51.55
Majority		3,964	
CPN (Maoist Centre) hold			

Total Voters: 1,61,065 · Votes Cast: 83,023 (51.55%) · Valid Votes: 86,124 (95.21%) · Invalid Votes: 3,977 (4.79%)

=== Election in the 2010s ===
==== 2017 legislative elections ====
Candidate	Party	Votes	%
Ganga Bahadur Tamang	Communist Party of Nepal (Maoist Centre)	43,631	48.84
Tirtha Bahadur Lama	Nepali Congress	39,605	44.33
Dan Bahadur Thapa	CPN (Marxist–Leninist)	3,133	3.51
Bhupendra Dhungana	Nepali Janata Dal	955	1.07
Bhushan Kumar Shrestha	Bibeksheel Sajha Party	784	0.88
Khemraj Neupane	Deshbhakta Janaganatantrik Morcha Nepal	430	0.48
Dhana Bahadur Tamang	Federal Socialist Forum, Nepal	291	0.33
Bhim Bahadur Rumba	Rastriya Janata Party Nepal	134	0.15
Krishna Bahadur Tamang	Nepal Workers Peasants Party	134	0.15
Tilak Bahadur Lama	Naya Shakti	108	0.12
Mohan Bahadur Rayamajhi	Nepali Congress (B.P.)	44	0.05
Raj Kumar Sah	Nepal Federal Socialist Party	34	0.04
Suntala Kaji Shrestha	Nepa Rastriya Party	33	0.04
Shanta Tamang	Liberal Democratic Party	13	0.01
Norbu Lama (Tamang)	Independent	13	0.01
Total		89,342	100.00
Valid votes		89,342	95.51
Invalid/blank votes		4,200	4.49
Total votes		93,542	100.00
Registered voters/turnout		133,778	72.96
Majority		4,026	
Maoist Centre gain from Nepali Congress			

Total Voters: 1,33,778 · Votes cast: 93,542 (72.96%) · Valid votes: 89,342 (95.51%) · Invalid votes: 4,200 (4.49%) Source: Election Commission

==== 2017 Nepalese provincial elections ====
===== Kavrepalanchok 1(A) =====
Candidate	Party	Votes	%
Ratna Prasad Dhakal	Communist Party of Nepal (Maoist Centre)	25,206	57.47
Chandra Bahadur Tamang	Nepali Congress	17,855	40.71
Yakina Thing	Deshbhakta Janaganatantrik Morcha Nepal	391	0.89
Rahar Singh Tamang	Federal Socialist Forum, Nepal	192	0.44
Man Maan Bal	Naya Shakti Party, Nepal	166	0.38
Bil Bahadur B.K	Nepal Majdoor Kisan Party	33	0.08
Milan Kumar Gautam	Independent	16	0.04
Total		43,859	100.00
Valid votes		43,859	97.18
Invalid/blank votes		1,272	2.82
Total votes		45,131	100.00
Registered voters/turnout		66,285	68.09
Majority		7,351	
Communist Party of Nepal (Maoist Centre) gain			

===== Kavrepalanchok 1(B) =====
Candidate	Party	Votes	%
Chandra Bahadur Lama	CPN (UML)	24,447	52.29
Ganesh Lama	Nepali Congress	20,270	43.35
Ganesh Kumar Kapali	CPN (Marxist–Leninist)	764	1.63
Kapil Dev Karmacharya	Bibeksheel Sajha Party	558	1.19
Kedar Bahadur Kuinkel	Nepali Janata Dal	275	0.59
Buddha Bahadur Lama	Federal Socialist Forum, Nepal	165	0.35
Chandika Chhuka	Nepal Majdoor Kisan Party	90	0.19
Shobha Bishwakarma	Deshbhakta Janaganatantrik Morcha Nepal	83	0.18
Ram Kumar Khadka	Naya Shakti Party, Nepal	53	0.11
Suresh Prasad Dhital	Independent	52	0.11
Total		46,757	100.00
Valid votes		46,757	96.29
Invalid/blank votes		1,804	3.71
Total votes		48,561	100.00
Registered voters/turnout		67,493	71.95
Majority		4,177	
CPN (UML) gain			

==== 2013 Constituent Assembly election ====
Party	Candidate	Votes
Nepali Congress	Tirtha Bahadur Lama	12,270
UCPN (Maoist)	Surya Man Dong Tamang	9,763
CPN (Unified Marxist–Leninist)	Sangram Jit Lama	9,125
Others		1,507
Result	Congress gain	
Source: NepalNews

=== Election in the 2000s ===
==== 2008 Constituent Assembly election ====
Candidate	Party	Votes	%
Surya Man Dong Tamang	CPN (Maoist)	27,471	55.24
Sangram Jit Lama	Communist Party of Nepal (Unified Marxist-Leninist)	8,407	16.90
Madhu Prasad Acharya	Nepali Congress	7,212	14.50
Kaman Singh Lama	Janamorcha Nepal	3,140	6.31
Wangju Lama Tamang	CPN (Marxist–Leninist)	1,596	3.21
Kancha Ram Tamang	Communist Party of Nepal (Unified)	679	1.37
Kami Singh Lama Tamang	Rastriya Prajatantra Party	384	0.77
Sukumaya Tamang	Rastriya Janashakti Party	197	0.40
Indra Prasad Chaulagain	Rastriya Janata Dal	195	0.39
Yaduman Shah	Rastriya Prajatantra Party Nepal	179	0.36
Kanchha Man Tamang Lama	Tamsaling Nepal Rastriya Dal	133	0.27
Gobinda Nath Upreti	Independent	73	0.15
Khadga Bahadur Lama (Tamang)	Federal Democratic National Forum	28	0.06
Dhandhoj Tamang	Nawa Janabadi Morcha	27	0.05
Prabhu Ram Dhu Shrestha	Nepal Samata Party	13	0.03
Total		49,734	100.00
Valid votes		49,734	96.01
Invalid/blank votes		2,066	3.99
Total votes		51,800	100.00
Majority		19,064	
CPN (Maoist) gain			

=== Election in the 1990s ===
==== 1999 legislative elections ====
Candidate	Party	Votes	%
Shiva Bahadur Deuja	Nepal Communist Party (UML)	17,015	36.67
Harsa Jit Lama	Nepali Congress	14,197	30.60
Satya Man Lama	Rastriya Prajatantra Party (Chand)	9,184	19.79
Kaman Singh Lama	Sanyukta Janamorcha Nepal	3,611	7.78
Palsang Lama	Rastriya Prajatantra Party	1,580	3.41
Hasta Bahadur Tamang	Nepali Janta Party Rastriya Sambriddhibad	412	0.89
Gyamjo Lama	Rastriya Janamukti Party	172	0.37
Dup Wangel Lama	Janamukti Party Nepal	167	0.36
Nav Raj Rana	Independent	61	0.13
Total		46,399	100.00
Valid votes		46,399	95.44
Invalid/blank votes		2,216	4.56
Total votes		48,615	100.00
Registered voters/turnout		83,656	58.11
Majority		2,818	
CPN (UML) hold			

==== 1994 legislative elections ====
Party	Candidate	Votes
CPN (Unified Marxist–Leninist)	Shiva Bahadur Deuja	13,146
Rastriya Prajatantra Party	Satya Man Lama	9,419
Nepali Congress	Harsha Jit Lama	8,658
Independent	Man Lama	3,597
Independent	Chamar Singh Lama	2,342
Samyukta Jana Morcha Nepal	Lal Nanda Tamang	2,298
Rastriya Janamukti Party	Gyamjo Lama	192
Nepal Majdoor Kisan Party	Krishna B. Thapa	108
Result	CPN (UML) gain	
Source: Election Commission

==== 1991 legislative elections ====
Party	Candidate	Votes
Samyukta Jana Morcha Nepal	Kaman Singh Lama	15,472
Nepali Congress	Dhan Jit Lama	6,535
Rashtriya Prajatantra Party (Thapa)	G. Pr. Upadhyaya	
Rastriya Prajatantra Party (Chand)	Prem Lama	
Janata Dal (Samajbadi Prajatantrik)	Dev Kumar Thakuri	
Independent	Dev Raj Lama	
Result	SJMN gain	

== Demographics ==
According to ward-level household listing data from the 2021 Nepal census (2078 BS) published by the Central Bureau of Statistics (CBS), the constituency has a total population of 161,530.

The constituency is composed of a mix of rural municipalities and partially included urban municipalities, resulting in a diverse demographic profile. Rural areas such as Khanikhola, Temal, Mahabharat, and Chaurideurali rural municipalities are predominantly inhabited by hill communities, while Namobuddha Municipality and parts of Dhulikhel and Panauti municipalities include more densely populated and urbanizing settlements.

Ethnically, the constituency is primarily inhabited by Tamang communities, along with Brahmin, Chhetri, Newar, and other groups. The Tamang population forms a significant proportion, especially in the rural hill municipalities. The constituency reflects the broader ethnic diversity of Kavrepalanchok District.

The population distribution is uneven, with higher population concentrations in municipal wards and relatively lower densities in remote rural wards. Migration, particularly foreign employment and internal migration toward urban centers, has influenced population dynamics in the region.

The male and female population distribution is relatively balanced, with a slight female majority in several rural wards, consistent with broader demographic trends observed in hill districts of Nepal.

== See also ==
- List of parliamentary constituencies of Nepal
