= Dipendra =

Dipendra may refer to:

- Dipendra of Nepal
- Dipendra Singh Airee
- Dipendra Chaudhary
- Dipendra Jha
- Dipendra K. Khanal
- Dipendra Prasad
- Dipendra Shrestha
