= Krishna Prasad Dahal =

Nepali politician

- कृष्ण प्रसाद दाहाल

Member of Parliament, Pratinidhi Sabha
- In office 4 March 2018 – 18 September 2022
- Preceded by: Indra Bahadur Baniya
- Succeeded by: Deepak Bahadur Singh
- Constituency: Makwanpur 1

Personal details
- Born: 17 June 1963 (age 63)
- Party: CPN (UML)
- Other political affiliations: CPN (ML)
- Spouse: Padma Paudyal
- Children: 2
- Parents: Bhuminanda Dahal (father); Dhaka Kumari Dahal (mother)

Krishna Prasad Dahal is a Nepalese Politician and serving as the Member Of House Of Representatives (Nepal) elected from Makwanpur-1, Province No. 3. He is member of the Nepal Communist Party.
