= Basundhara Humagain =

Nepalese politician (born 1970)

- बसुन्धरा हुमागाईं

Minister for Agriculture and Livestock Development of Bagmati Province
- In office 14 December 2021 – 23 December 2022
- Governor: Yadav Chandra Sharma
- Chief Minister: Rajendra Prasad Pandey
- Succeeded by: Keshav Prasad Pokharel

Member of the Bagmati Provincial Assembly
- In office 1 February 2018 – 18 September 2022
- Preceded by: Constituency created
- Succeeded by: Kanchan Chandra Bade
- Constituency: Kavrepalanchok 2 (B)

Personal details
- Born: Basundhara Humagain; 4 December 1970 (age 55) Bhumidanda, Panauti, Kavre
- Citizenship: Nepali
- Party: Nepali Communist Party (2025-present)
- Other political affiliations: CPN (Unified Socialist) (2021-2025); CPN (UML) (until 2018; 2021); Nepal Communist Party (2018-2021)
- Spouse: Ambika Humagain
- Parent: Narayan Prasad Humagain (father)
- Profession: Politician; Dairy farming; Teacher

Basundhara Humagain (Nepali: बसुन्धरा हुमागाईं) (born 4 September 1970) is a Nepalese politician who served as a member of the Bagmati Provincial Assembly. Representing the Communist Party of Nepal (Unified Marxist–Leninist), he was elected from Kavrepalanchok 2 (B).

== Political career ==
Humagain previously served as the Minister for Agriculture and Livestock Development of Bagmati Province in the cabinet led by Rajendra Prasad Pandey.

During his tenure, he introduced a 51-point roadmap aimed at promoting agricultural development in the province.

In 2021, amid a split within the Communist Party of Nepal (Unified Marxist–Leninist), Humagain was among the lawmakers who joined the newly formed CPN (Unified Socialist), led by Madhav Kumar Nepal.
