= Kanchan Chandra Bade =

Nepalese politician

Honourable Kanchan Chandra Bade
- कन्चन चन्द्र बादे
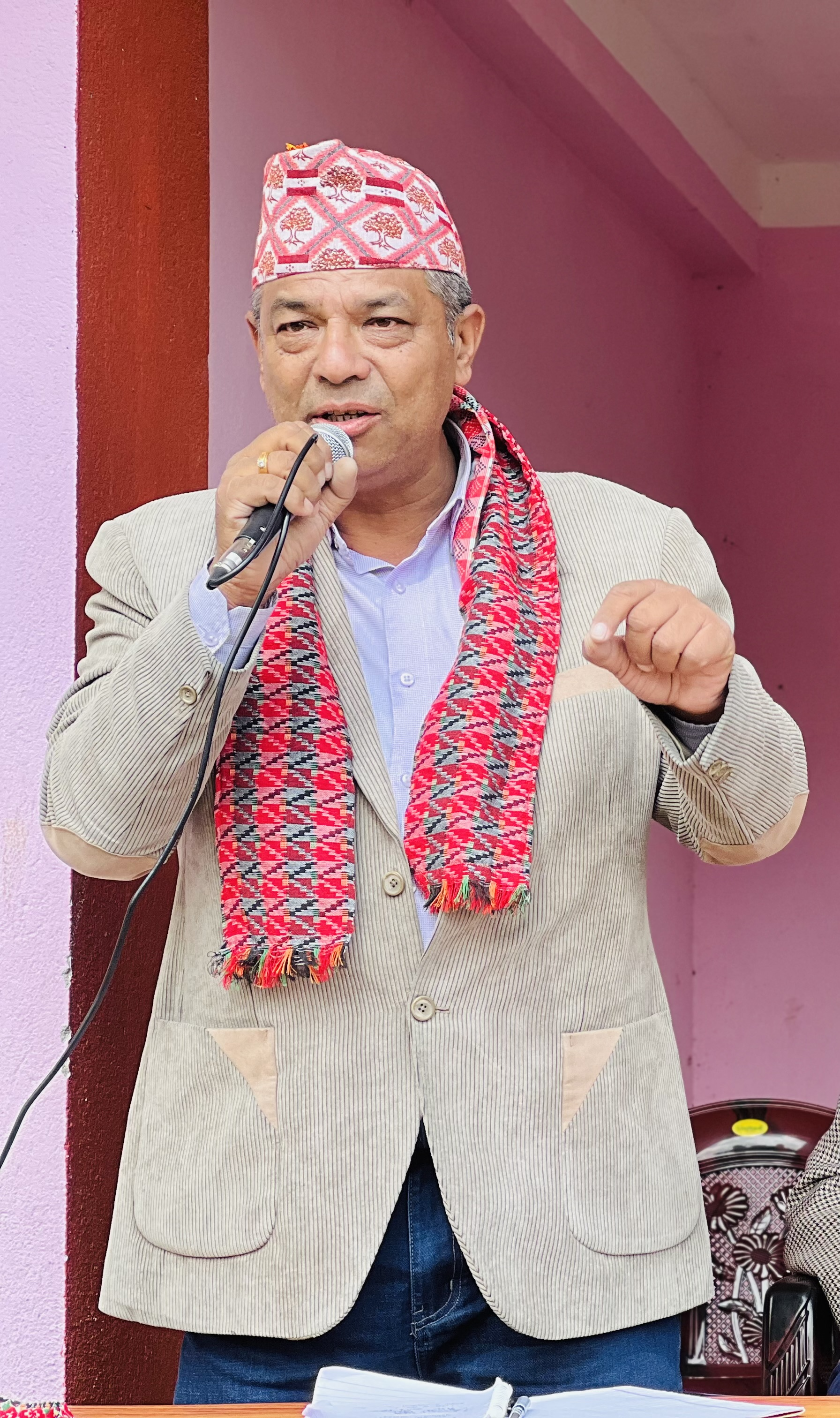
- Kanchan Chandra Bade campaigning in October 2022 in Dhungkharka, Bethanchok.

Member of the Provincial Assembly of Bagmati Province
- Incumbent
- Assumed office 2 January 2023
- Preceded by: Basundhara Humagain
- Constituency: Kavre-2(B)

Minister for Health and Social Development, Bagmati Province
- In office 23 July 2026 – 17 August 2026
- President: Ram Chandra Paudel
- Governor: Deepak Prasad Devkota
- Chief Minister: Indra Bahadur Baniya

Minister for Social Development, Bagmati Province
- In office 15 August 2025 – 23 July 2026
- President: Ram Chandra Paudel
- Governor: Deepak Prasad Devkota
- Chief Minister: Indra Bahadur Baniya
- Preceded by: Hariprabha Khadgi

General Secretary of Nepali Congress Bagmati Province
- Incumbent
- Assumed office 7 December 2021 Serving with Raju Shrestha
- Province Chairman: Indra Bahadur Baniya
- Preceded by: position established

Member of Second Constituent Assembly of Nepal
- In office 21 January 2014 – 14 October 2017
- Preceded by: Krishna Prasad Sapkota
- Constituency: Kavre 3 (abolished 2017)

Minister of State for Industry
- In office 30 November 2016 – 31 May 2017
- Prime Minister: Pushpa Kamal Dahal
- Minister: Nabindra Raj Joshi

Deputy Mayor of Banepa Municipality
- In office June 1997 – May 2002

Personal details
- Born: 21 April 1967 (age 59) Banepa, Nepal
- Citizenship: Nepali
- Party: Nepali Congress
- Parent: Gopaldas Bade (father)
- Profession: Politician

Kanchan Chandra Bade (Nepali: कन्चन चन्द्र बादे; born 21 April 1967) is a Nepali politician affiliated with the Nepali Congress. He is a member of the Provincial Assembly of Bagmati Province representing Kavre-2(B). He previously served as Minister of State for Industry in the Government of Nepal from 2016 to 2017 and as Minister for Social Development of Bagmati Province from 2025 to 2026.

== Early life and background ==
Bade was born in Banepa, Nepal. He is the son of freedom fighter Gopaldas Bade.

== Political career ==
Bade became politically active during his student years through the Nepal Student Union, the student wing of the Nepali Congress.

He was elected to the 2nd Nepalese Constituent Assembly in 2013 from Kavre-3. He participated in national-level discussions on local governance reform during the Constituent Assembly period, including workshops organized by the Ministry of Federal Affairs and Local Development on federal restructuring and local governance.

He was elected as General Secretary of the Nepali Congress Bagmati Province Committee in the 14th General Convention of the party in 2021.

In the 2022 provincial elections, he was elected to the Provincial Assembly of Bagmati Province.

== Ministerial roles ==
Bade was appointed Minister of State for Industry in November 2016 in the cabinet led by Pushpa Kamal Dahal. During his tenure as a government minister and federal politician, Bade participated in policy discussions and public programs related to economic development, governance reform, and youth employment.

In 2025, he was appointed Minister for Social Development of Bagmati Province. His tenure ended on 17 August 2026, following the resignation of Chief Minister Indra Bahadur Baniya after his government lost its majority in the provincial assembly.
