= Suraj Chandra Lamichhane =

Internal Affairs Minister of Bagmati province, Nepal

Hon'ble Suraj Chandra Lamichhane
- सुरज चन्द्र लामिछाने
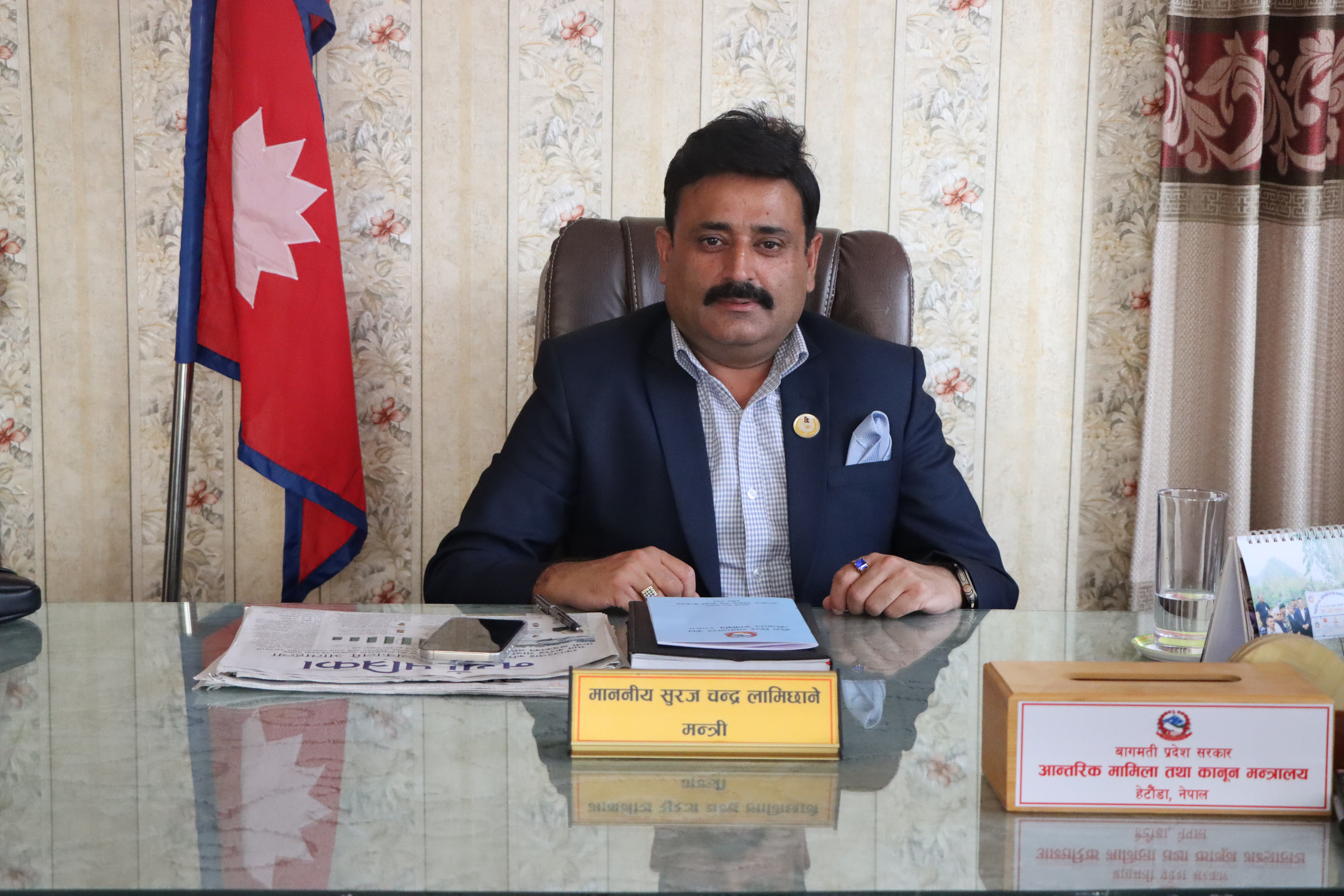

8th Minister for Internal Affairs and Law of Bagmati Province
- Incumbent
- Assumed office 24 July 2024
- Governor: Deepak Prasad Devkota
- Chief Minister: Bahadur Singh Lama
- Preceded by: Ganga Narayan Shrestha

Member of Bagmati Provincial Assembly
- Incumbent
- Assumed office 2022
- Constituency: Kathmandu

Personal details
- Born: 19 January 1974 (age 52)
- Party: Nepali Congress

Suraj Chandra Lamichhane (Nepali: सुरज चन्द्र लामिछाने) is a Nepali politician currently Minister of Internal Affairs and Law, Bagamati Province. Lamichhane is also a spokesperson for Bagamati Province Government. Lamichhane is elected as a member of the Bagamati Provincial Assembly from First Past the Post System from Kathmandu 1(2). representing the Nepali Congress as a member of the Bagamati Provincial Assembly.

He has graduated from Tribhuvan University holding a Master's degree in business studies. He completed his undergraduate from Baneshwor Campus taking Business Studies as his major in 1997. He pursued his higher secondary level known as I.Sc. from Amrit Science College and secondary level from Adarsha Madhyamik Vidyalaya (DMPS), Sanothimi, Bhaktapur in 1990.

Since his early school days, he was actively involved in school activities, oratory programs, and social activities which led to his involvement in political activism. During his school days, he joined the Nepal Student Union (NSU), a sister organization of Nepali Congress a wing looking after the student's affairs. He contested Free Student Union(FSU) for the post of executive member during his graduate studies at Tribhuvan University.

After graduating, he joined Nepal Tarun Dal, another sister organization of Nepali Congress, a wing looking into youth affairs. He has been elected as the central convention representative of the organization several times. Parallel, he was involved in mainstream politics and party politics of the Nepali Congress. He has actively participated in political movements under the leadership of the Nepali Congress since 1990. He has been elected as national convention representative and national conference meeting as a member of the highest body of the Nepali Congress several times since the 12th national convention of the party. Lamichhane lost a Provincial Assembly Election of 2017 from Kathmandu Constituency 1(2) with a narrow margin of 11 votes to Ganesh Dulal a candidate from the Unified Marxist Leninist (UML) party. And, secured a seat as Member of Parliament of Bagmati Province Assembly in 2022 from Kathmandu Constituency 1(2) with a vote difference of 1757 against the same competitor, Ganesh Dulal candidate from Unified Marxist Leninist (UML).

== See also ==
- Bahadur Singh Lama cabinet
