= Shiva Prasad Humagain =

Nepali politician

- शिवप्रसाद हुमागाईं
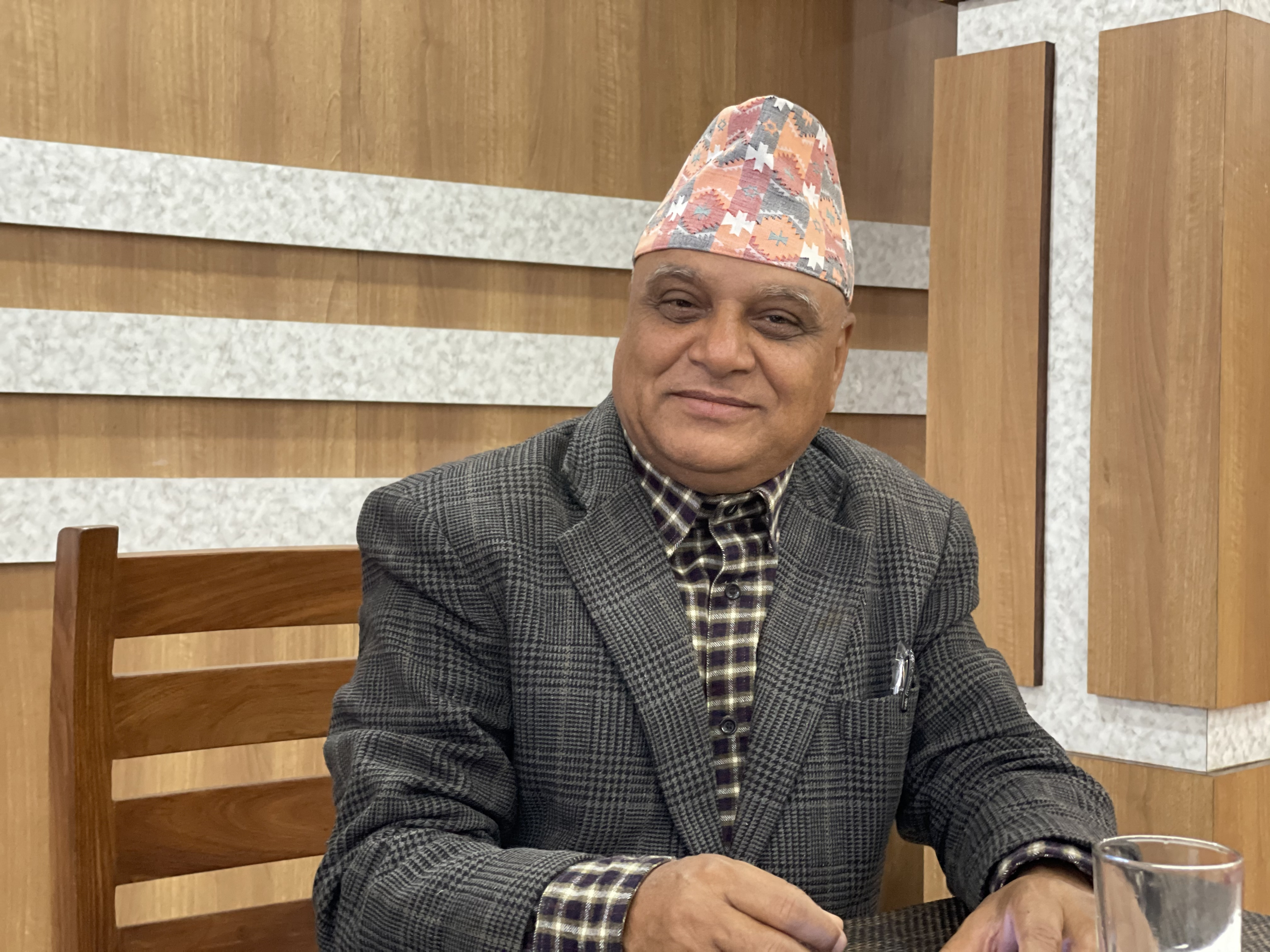

Central Committee Member, Nepali Congress
- In office 21 September 2023 – 14 January 2026
- President: Sher Bahadur Deuba
- In office June 6, 2018 – December 2, 2021
- President: Sher Bahadur Deuba

Member of Parliament, Pratinidhi Sabha
- In office January 15, 2007 – January 18, 2008
- Prime Minister: Girija Prasad Koirala
- Succeeded by: Akal Bahadur Thing (as Member of the Constituent Assembly)
- Constituency: Kavre 2
- In office May 31, 1999 – May 21, 2002
- Prime Minister: Krishna Prasad Bhattarai, Girija Prasad Koirala, Sher Bahadur Deuba
- Preceded by: Keshab Prasad Badal
- Constituency: Kavre 2

Personal details
- Born: Shiva Prasad Humagain; 9 July 1961 (age 65) Kusadevi Village, Kavre
- Party: Nepali Congress
- Spouse: Gayatri Humagain (m. 1990)
- Children: 2
- Parents: Laxmi Prasad Humagain (father); Dewa Maya Humagain (mother)

Shiva Prasad Humagain (Nepali: शिवप्रसाद हुमागाईं; born 9 July 1961) is a Nepali politician who served as a member of the Central Working Committee of the Nepali Congress from 2018 to 2021 and again from 2023 to 2026. He previously served as a member of the Pratinidhi Sabha, representing Kavre 2 after winning the 1999 general election.

== Early life ==
Humagain was born in Kusadevi Village, Panauti to Laxmi Prasad Humagain and Dewa Maya Humagain.

== Political career ==
Following the royal takeover of 1 February 2005, Humagain participated in protests against King Gyanendra's government and was detained for several days. After the 2006 democracy movement and the reinstatement of the Pratinidhi Sabha, he served as a member of the reinstated House of Representatives and the Interim Legislature-Parliament.

=== Political Posts ===
Tenure	Political Position	Office/Organization
5 August 2024 - 14 Jan 2026	Chief - Public Transport and Transport Entrepreneurs	Nepali Congress
21 Sept 2023 - 14 Jan 2026	Central Working Committee Member	Nepali Congress
29 Feb, 2020 - 2 Dec, 2021	Chief - Department of Labor & Trade Unions	Nepali Congress
6 Jun, 2018 - 2 Dec, 2021	Central Working Committee Member	Nepali Congress
2009 - 2015	Chairman	Nepali Congress Kavre District Committee
2007 - 2008	Member of Parliament	Reinstated House & The Interim legislature of Nepal
2002	Secretary - Organization Department	Nepali Congress
1999 - 2002	Member of Parliament	Pratinidhi Sabha
1991 - 1994	Regional Chairman	Nepali Congress Kavre - 3

=== Nepali Congress leadership ===
Humagain has been associated with the faction led by Krishna Prasad Sitaula within the Nepali Congress.

During the party's 13th General Convention in 2016, he supported Sitaula's candidacy for party president and contested for a seat on the Central Working Committee from Province No. 3, receiving 201 votes.

In June 2018, party president Sher Bahadur Deuba nominated Humagain to the Central Working Committee.

In February 2020, Deuba appointed him chief of the party's Department of Labour and Trade Unions.

During the COVID-19 pandemic, Humagain called on the government to provide financial assistance to low-income households and advocated measures to protect workers' employment, occupational health and safety, migrant workers, and informal-sector labourers. He also participated in relief activities, including the distribution of food, shelter assistance, and personal protective equipment (PPE), masks and sanitizers to local governments in Kavrepalanchok District.

== Comparative table of elections ==
Elections	Parliament of Nepal	Constituency	Political party	Result	Vote percentage	Opposition		
Elections	Parliament of Nepal	Constituency	Political party	Result	Vote percentage	Candidate	Political party	Vote percentage
1999	4th	Kavre 2	NC	Won	42.84%	Keshab Prasad Badal	CPN(UML)	41.17%
2008	1st CA	Kavre 3 (abolished 2017)	NC	Lost	28.76%	Krishna Prasad Sapkota	CPN(UML)	32.73%
2013	2nd CA	Kavre 2	NC	Lost	29.07%	Ram Hari Subedi	CPN(UML)	35.57%
2022	6th	Kavre 2	NC	Lost	39.79%	Gokul Prasad Baskota	CPN(UML)	45.69%

== Electoral history ==
1999 Pratinidhi Sabha Election Kavre - 2

Party	Candidate	Votes	%	Status
Nepali Congress	Shiva Prasad Humagain	25,390	42.84	Elected
Communist Party of Nepal (UML)	Keshab Prasad Badal	24,401	41.17	
Rastriya Prajatantra Party	Laxmi Narsingh Bade Shrestha	5,201	8.78	
CPN (Marxist–Leninist)	Tri Bikram Karmacharya	1,796	3.03	
Nepal Workers Peasants Party	Hari Prasad Manandhar	1,176	1.98	
Rastriya Prajantantra Party (Chand)	Aarju Kumar KC	825	1.39	
Independent	Sudarshan Humagain	271	0.46	
Independent	Min Bahadur Shahi	155	0.26	
Independent	Surya Bahadur Thapa	50	0.09	
	Total	59,265	100	

Total Voters: 83,364 Votes Cast:60,822 (72.96%) Valid Votes: 59,265 (97.44%)

2008 Constituent Assembly Election Kavre - 3.

Candidate	Party	Votes	%
Krishna Prasad Sapkota	CPN (UML)	16,594	32.73
Shiva Prasad Humagain	Nepali Congress	14,579	28.76
Mina Dong Tamang	Nepali Communist Party	13,510	26.65
Others		6,011	11.86
Total		50,694	100.00
Valid votes		50,694	95.75
Invalid/blank votes		2,251	4.25
Total votes		52,945	100.00
Registered voters/turnout		75,929	69.73
Majority		2,015	
CPN (UML) gain			

Total Voters: 75,929 · Votes Cast: 52,945 (69.73%) · Valid Votes: 50,694 (95.75%) · Invalid Votes:2,251 (4.25%)

2013 Constituent Assembly Election Kavre - 2

Party	Candidate	Votes	%	Status
Communist Party of Nepal (UML)	Ram Hari Subedi	13,510	35.57	Elected
Nepali Congress	Shiva Prasad Humagain	11,040	29.07	
UCPN (Maoist)	Akal Bahadur Thing	5,913	15.57	
Madhesi Janaadhikar Forum, Nepal (Democratic)	Ganesh Lama	4,908	12.92	
	Others	2,608	6.87	
	Total	37,979	100	

Total Voters: 75,929 Votes Cast: 52,945 (80.76%) Valid Votes: 37,979 (71.73%)

2022 House of Representatives Election Kavre-2

Party	Candidate	Votes	%	Status
Communist Party of Nepal (UML)	Gokul Prasad Baskota	45,345	45.69	Elected
Nepali Congress	Shiva Prasad Humagain	39,482	39.79	
Rastriya Swatantra Party	Dinesh Humagain	10,573	10.65	
Rastriya Prajatantra Party	Yashu Aale Magar	1,933	1.94	
Nepal Workers' and Peasants' Party	Krishna Kumar Baidhya	802	0.80	
Independent	Manoj Pandit	173	0.17	
People's Socialist Party, Nepal	Siddhi Bahadur Joshi	162	0.16	
Independent	Shwoyambhu Raj Shakya	115	0.11	
Nepal Naulo Janbadi Party	Ganga Lal Shrestha	100	0.10	
Independent	Shesh Raj Lamichhane	100	0.10	
Communist Party of Nepal (Maoist Socialist)	Yok Bahadur Ghising	99	0.09	
Mongol National Organisation	Achamma Lama	92	0.09	
Communist Party of Nepal (Paribartan)	Uttar Kumar Lama	92	0.09	
Independent	Bodh Nath Neupane	83	0.08	
Independent	Krishna Khatri	45	0.04	
Sanghiya Loktantrik Rastriya Manch	Bijay Tamang	35	0.03	
	Total	99,231	100	

Total Voters: 1,57,442 · Votes Cast: 1,02,729 (65.25%) · Valid Votes: 99,231 (96.59%) · Invalid Votes: 3,498 (3.41%)
