= Keshab Prasad Badal =

Nepalese politician

- केशव प्रसाद बडाल
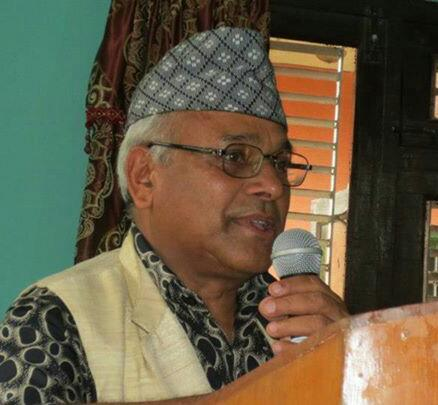

Member of the 2nd Nepalese Constituent Assembly
- In office 20 January 2014 – 14 October 2017
- Prime Minister: Sushil Koirala, K. P. Sharma Oli, Pushpa Kamal Dahal, Sher Bahadur Deuba
- Constituency: CPN (UML) Party list

Minister for Industry
- In office 25 March 1997 – 6 October 1997
- Prime Minister: Lokendra Bahadur Chand
- Preceded by: Dundiraj Shastri
- Succeeded by: Fateh Singh Tharu

Member of Parliament, Pratinidhi Sabha
- In office May 31, 1994 – May 31, 1999
- Prime Minister: Man Mohan Adhikari, Sher Bahadur Deuba, Lokendra Bahadur Chand Surya Bahadur Thapa, Girija Prasad Koirala
- Preceded by: Shiva Bahadur Deuja
- Succeeded by: Shiva Prasad Humagain
- Constituency: Kavre 2
- In office 20 June 1991 – 11 July 1994
- Prime Minister: Girija Prasad Koirala
- Preceded by: Constituency established
- Succeeded by: Gobinda Nath Uprety
- Constituency: Kavre 3 (abolished 2017)

Personal details
- Born: Keshab Prasad Badal; 10 November 1952 (age 73) Temal Village, Kavre
- Citizenship: Nepali
- Party: Communist Party of Nepal (Unified Marxist–Leninist)
- Spouse: Shanti Badal
- Parents: Uma Kanta Badal (father); Hem Kumari Badal (mother)
- Education: Tri-Chandra Campus, TU (Bachelor of Economics)

Keshav Prasad Badal (Nepali: केशव प्रसाद बडाल) (born October 1952, in Kavre District) is a Nepalese politician.

Badal obtained his Bachelor of Economics degree from Tribhuvan University. He studied at Tri-Chandra Campus in Kathmandu.

Encounters with feudal rule in the 1960s radicalized the young Badal. He became a political activist in 1969. As of 1976 he was part of the central leadership of the Proletarian Revolutionary Organisation, Nepal. He was put in charge of leading the organisation in the Narayani, Janakpur and Bagmati zones. In 1978 he became a member of the Nepal Workers Peasants Organisation, in 1981 he was included in the politburo of the organisation (presumably of the Sharma faction, later D.P. Singh faction). After the merger of the D.P. Singh group with the Communist Party of Nepal (Marxist-Leninist) (CPN(ML)), Badal became secretary of the Kavre District Committee and a member of the Bagmati Zonal Committee of CPN(ML).

Badal was elected Bagmati Zonal Committee as incharge and Alternate Central Committee Member at the 4th congress of CPN(ML) in 1990. As the leader of the party in the Bagmati zone, he played a key role in the 1990 Jana Andolan ('People's Movement'). The third national conference of the All Nepal Peasants Association elected him as its general secretary.

After the foundation of the Communist Party of Nepal (Unified Marxist-Leninist) (CPN(UML)), Badal was made secretary of the Kavre District Committee of the party and included in its National Council.

Badal was elected to the Pratinidhi Sabha (House of Representatives) in the 1991 general election from the Kavre-2 constituency. He obtained 16,325 votes. He retained his seat in the 1994 general election, obtaining 19,938 votes. Badal chaired the 1995-1996 High Level Land Reform Commission (which became popularly known as the 'Badal Commission'). The report of the Badal Commission proposed measures for promoting access to agricultural lands to poor peasants.

In March 1997, he was appointed as Minister of Industries in the Third Chand cabinet under Prime Minister Lokendra Bahadur Chand. He lost his parliamentary seat in the 1999 general election, being defeated by Shiva Prasad Humagain of the Nepali Congress. Badal obtained 24,401 votes.

Badal served as chairman of the National Cooperative Federation, Nepal (NCFN). He also served as a commissioner of the Commission for the Investigation of Abuse of Authority (CIAA).
