= Shuk Maya Tamang =

Hon'ble Minister Shuk Maya Tamang

Hon'ble Shuk Maya Tamang
- शुक माया तामाङ
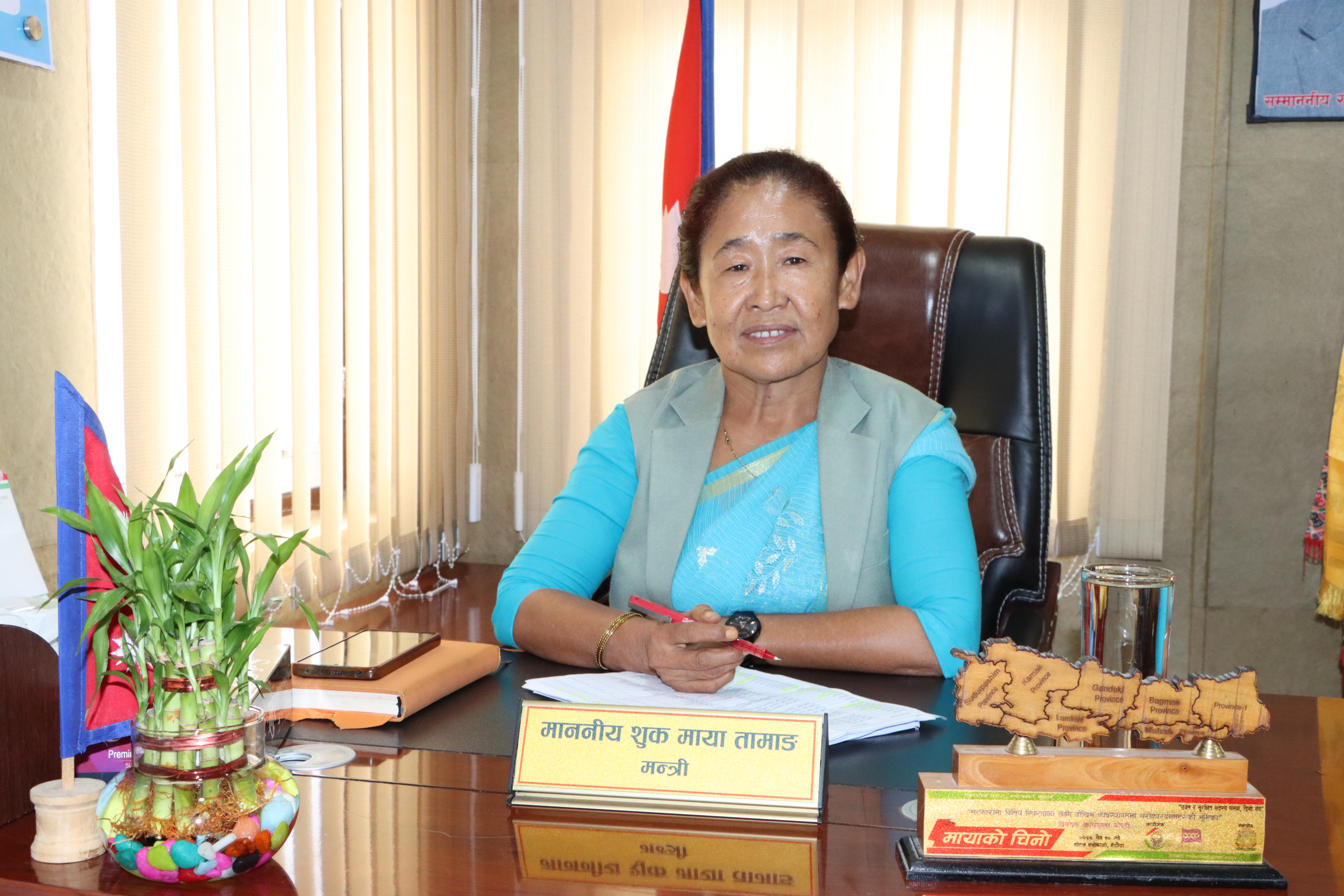

3rd Minister for Industry, Commerce, Land and Administration of Bagmati Province
- In office 24 July 2024 – 4 August 2025
- Governor: Deepak Prasad Devkota
- Chief Minister: Bahadur Singh Lama
- Preceded by: Prakash Shrestha
- Succeeded by: Bindu Shrestha

Member of the Bagmati Provincial Assembly
- Incumbent
- Assumed office 29 December 2022

Personal details
- Born: 9 July 1975 (age 50)
- Party: Communist Party of Nepal (Unified Marxist–Leninist)

Shuk Maya Tamang (Nepali: शुक माया तामाङ) is a Nepali politician and former Minister for Industry, Commerce, Land and Administration of Bagmati Province. Tamang is also served as member of the 2nd Bagmati Provincial Assembly..

Shuk Maya Tamang is elected through the proportional representation system from CPN(UML) served as member of the Industry, Tourism and Environment Committee of the Bagamati Provincial Assembly.

== See also ==
- Bahadur Singh Lama cabinet
