= Prakash Gautam =

Nepalese politician

The Honourable Prakash Gautam
- प्रकाश गौतम

Member of Parliament, Pratinidhi Sabha
- Incumbent
- Assumed office 26 March 2026
- Preceded by: Deepak Bahadur Singh
- Constituency: Makwanpur 1

Personal details
- Citizenship: Nepalese
- Party: Rastriya Swatantra Party
- Profession: Politician

Prakash Gautam (Nepali: प्रकाश गौतम) is a Nepalese politician serving as a member of parliament from the Rastriya Swatantra Party. He is the member of the 7th Pratinidhi Sabha elected from Makwanpur 1 constituency in 2026 Nepalese General Election securing 36,033 votes and defeating his closest contender Mahalaxmi Upadhyaya of the Nepali Congress.
