= Thrangu Tashi Yangtse Monastery, Nepal =

Tibetan Buddhist monastery in Nepal

Thrangu Tashi Yangtse Monastery, Namo Buddha
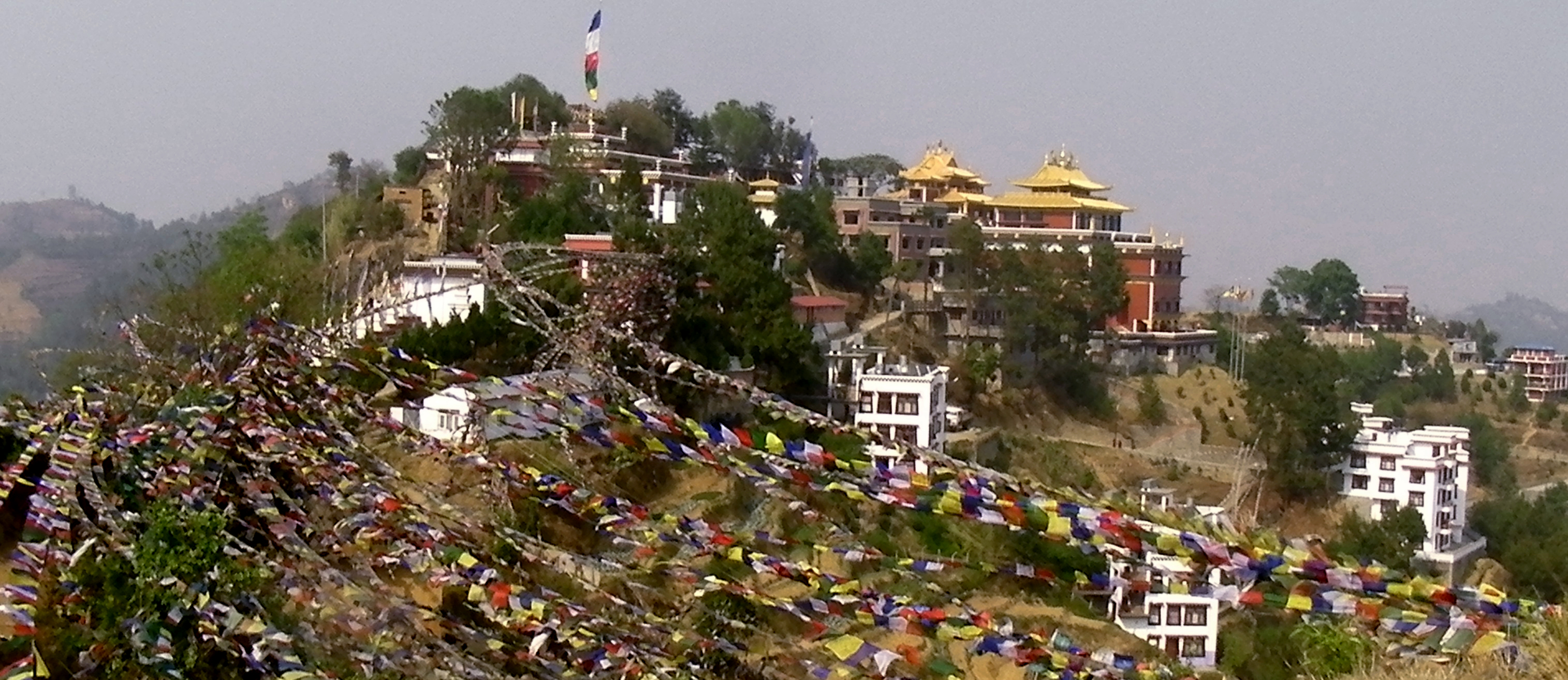

- Location within Nepal

Religion
- Affiliation: Tibetan Buddhism
- Leadership: The Very Venerable 9th Khenchen Thrangu Rinpoche

Location
- Location: Kavrepalanchok District, Bagmati Zone, Nepal
- Country: Nepal
- Coordinates: 27°34′16″N 85°34′57″E

Architecture
- Founder: The Very Venerable 9th Khenchen Thrangu Rinpoche
- Established: 20th century

The Thrangu Tashi Yangtse Monastery or Namo Buddha Monastery is a Tibetan Buddhist monastery about 40 km (by road) southeast of Nepal's capital city Kathmandu and 2.3 km from Manegaun, a Tamang village. It lies at the top of the hill in Namo Buddha Municipality.

The monastery is a center for tourism. The main festivals and mela celebrated here are Kartik Purnima and Buddha Jayanti.

According to legend, 6000 years ago Prince Mahasatwo (also known as Ngingdui Tshenpo) discovered a starving tigress and her five cubs. To save the lives of the tigers, Mahasatwo cut his body so that the warm blood drew the tigress to him. The tigress ate the prince and left only his bones. The bones of the prince were brought back to the village and buried in a tomb which became the stupa of Namo Buddha.

Some 3500 years later, Gautam Buddha came to the village of Sange da Fyafulsa. He conducted three tours around the stupa before he declared that he was the reincarnation of Prince Mahasatwo. Gautam Buddha then renamed this village to Namo Buddha, meaning homage to Buddha.

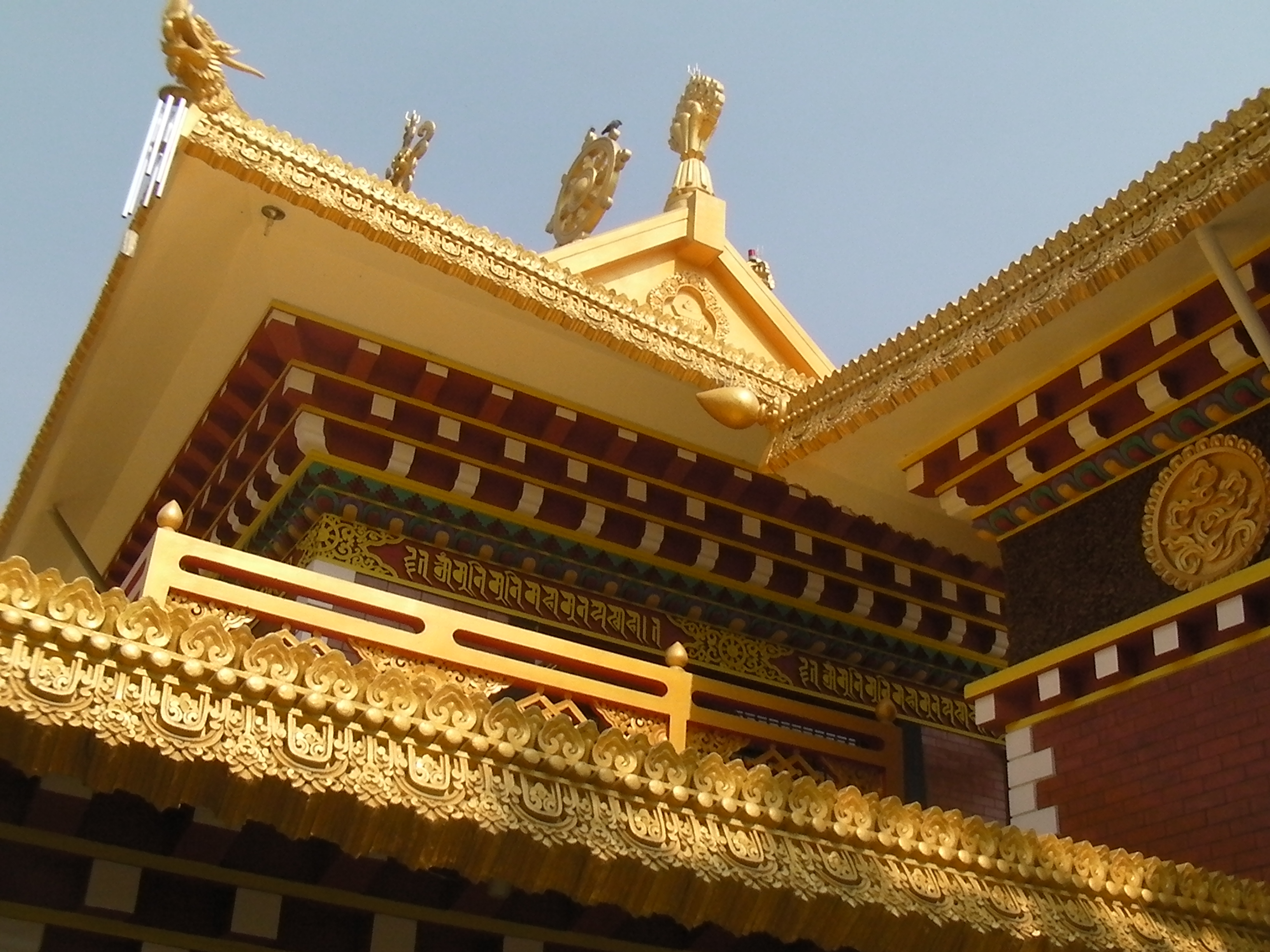
Thrangu Tashi Yangtse Temple

Since it was founded by V.V. Khenchen Thrangu Rinpoche in 1978 the monastery has grown to be the home to more than 250 monks.

The Thrangu Tashi Yangtse Temple was officially opened on December 5, 2008. The Shree Mangal Dvip Branch School for young monks is also part of the monastery complex.
