= Ganga Bahadur Tamang =

Nepali politician

- गंगा बहादुर तामाङ

Member of Parliament, Pratinidhi Sabha
- In office 4 March 2018 – 18 September 2022
- Preceded by: Tirtha Bahadur Lama (as Member of the Constituent Assembly)
- Succeeded by: Surya Man Dong Tamang
- Constituency: Kavrepalanchok 1

Personal details
- Born: 12 April 1971 (age 55) Temal, Kavre, Nepal
- Party: Nepali Communist Party
- Other political affiliations: CPN (Maoist Centre) (1994–2018; 2021–2025); Nepal Communist Party (2018–2021); CPN (Unity Centre) (1991–1994)
- Spouse: Ram Maya Tamang
- Parents: Krishna Bahadur Tamang (father); Kamisyaa Tamang (mother)
- Nickname: बमध्वज transl. Bomb Flag

Ganga Bahadur Tamang Dong (Nepali: गंगा बहादुर तामाङ) is a Nepali politician and former member of the House of Representatives's federal parliament. He was elected from the Kavre-1 constituency under the first-past-the-post system, representing the Communist Party of Nepal (Maoist Centre) as part of the left alliance. In the election, he defeated his closest rival, Tirtha Bahadur Lama of the Nepali Congress, securing 43,631 votes to Lama’s 39,605. He defeated his nearest rival, Tirtha Bahadur Lama of Nepali Congress securing 43,631 votes against Lama's 39,605. Prior to that, he had only contested one local level election and lost.

Prior to this, he had contested a local-level election for the post of chairperson of Temal Rural Municipality, losing to Salam Singh Lama of the Nepali Congress.

During his tenure in parliament, he served as a member of the Public Accounts Committee.

During the Nepalese civil war, Dong was affiliated with the Maoist movement. He was a member of the Tamang Republican Autonomous Region People’s Council and served as a leader of the Tamang National Liberation Front, the Maoist party’s Tamang nationalist wing. He was also a leader of the Tamang National Liberation Front, the Tamang nationalist wing of the maoist party, during the war.
