= Namo Buddha =

Municipality in Kavrepalanchok District of Nepal

Namo Buddha नमोबुद्ध
- Municipality
- Namo Buddha Municipality
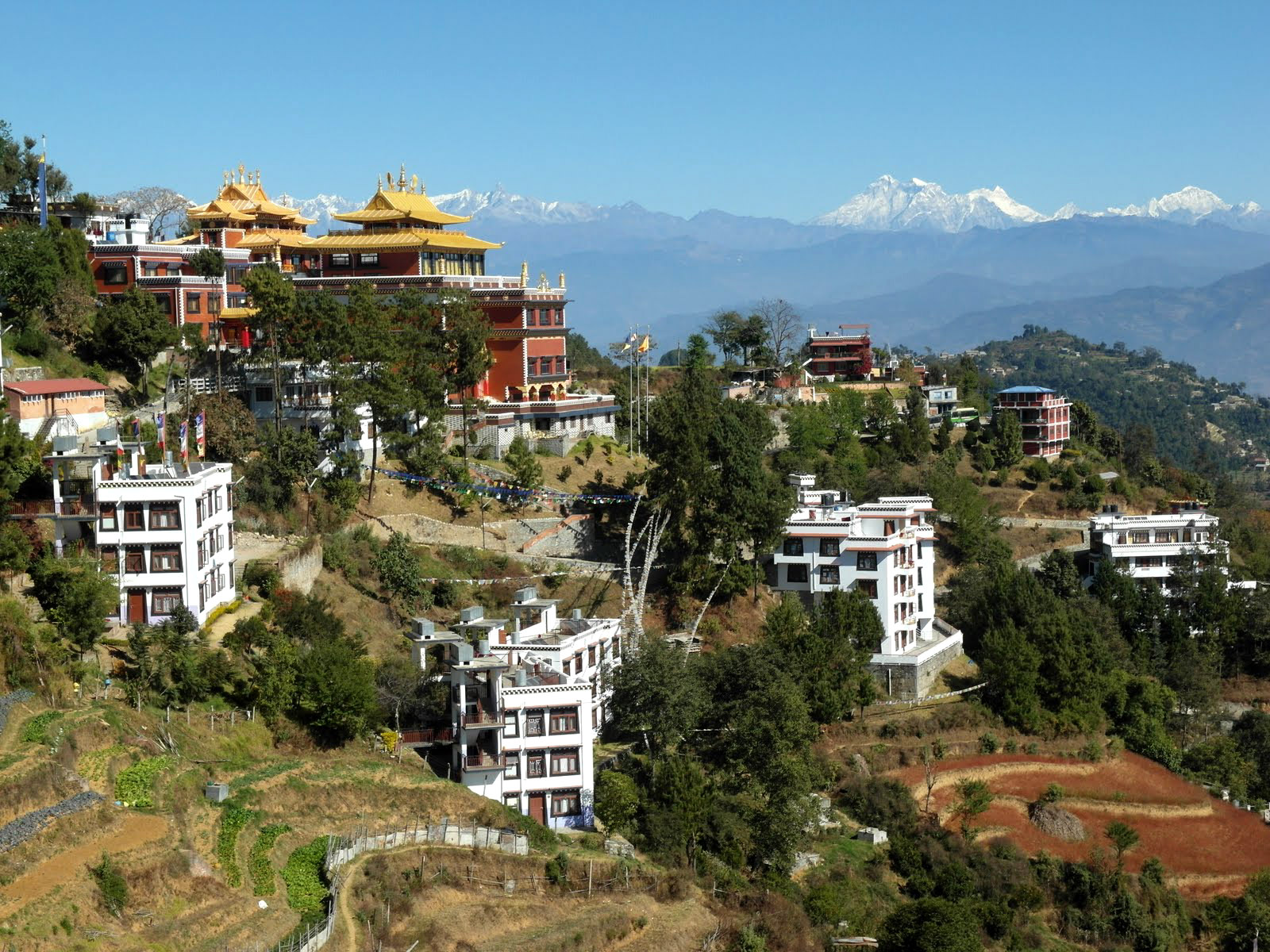

- Location in Nepal
- Coordinates: 27°34′16″N 85°35′03″E
- Country: Nepal
- Province: Bagmati Province
- District: Kavrepalanchok District

Government
  - Type: Mayor–council government
  - Mayor: Mr. Kunsang Lama
  - Deputy Mayor: Mr. Ratna Bahadur Lama

Area
  - Total: 102.00 km^{2} (39.38 sq mi)

Population (2021)
  - Total: 26,160.00
  - Density: 256.47/km^{2} (664.26/sq mi)
- Time zone: UTC+5:45 (NST)
- Postal code: 45210
- Area code: 011
- Website: www.namobuddhamun.gov.np/

Namo Buddha (Nepali: नमोबुद्ध, "Namo", Hommage; "Buddha", to the Buddha) or Takmo Lüjin (Tib. སྟག་མོ་ལུས་སྦྱིན་, Wyl. stag mo (tigress) lus sbyin (body giving)) is located in a municipality in Kavrepalanchok District of Bagmati Province of Nepal, 52 km southeast of Kathmandu. Namo Buddha is named after the self-sacrifice by an early incarnation of Shakyamuni Buddha, performed to save the lives of a tigress and her cubs. The Namo Buddha Stupa houses his bone relics and is considered one of the three most important pilgrimage sites and main stupas in the Kathmandu Valley.

Connected to the stupa by a stairway rising into the woods is the site where the prince was actually eaten, sanctified adjacent to the grounds of the Karma Kagyu tradition's Namo Buddha Monastery of Thrangu Rinpoche, named Thrangu Tashi Yangtze Choling. This site and the stupa have been revered by Buddhist masters throughout history, while modern spiritual leaders from the Nyingma, Kagyu, Sakya, and Gelug traditions continue to make pilgrimages to Namo Buddha.

The town of Panauti, 8 km downhill from the stupa, was the location of Prince Mahasattva's (Nepali sources), also known as Prince Nyingthob Chenpo (Tibetan sources), familial palace. The annual festival of Namo Buddha Mela is held there in November.

It was renamed from Dapcha Kashikhanda.

== Demographics ==
At the time of the 2011 Nepal census, Namobuddha Municipality had a population of 29,926. Of these, 44.7% spoke Nepali, 43.4% Tamang, 11.2% Newar, 0.2% Magar, 0.1% Danuwar, 0.1% Maithili and 0.1% other languages as their first language.

In terms of ethnicity/caste, 43.8% were Tamang, 24.8% Hill Brahmin, 12.0% Newar, 8.1% Chhetri, 3.1% Kami, 3.0% Sarki, 2.4% Damai/Dholi, 0.9% Magar, 0.8% Gharti/Bhujel, 0.3% Sanyasi/Dasnami, 0.2% Sunuwar, 0.1% other Dalit, 0.1% Danuwar, 0.1% other Terai and 0.2% others.

In terms of religion, 54.7% were Hindu, 42.4% Buddhist, 2.0% Christian and 0.9% others.

In terms of literacy, 67.7% could read and write, 2.4% could only read and 29.8% could neither read nor write.

=== Popular Figures ===
- Hari Bansha Acharya Actor
- Ram Bahadur Khatri Producer,Director and Actor
- Daya Ram Dahal Director
- Ravindra Khadka Actor
- Shweta Khadka Nepalese film actress, producer, politician and entrepreneur
- Mukunda Thapa Actor
- Shiva Prasad Humagain Politician
- Ganesh Lama Businessman and Politician
- Nimesh Ulak Academician and Researcher
