= Madhu Kumar Chaulagain =

Nepalese politician and lawyer

- मधुकुमार चौलागाईं

Member of Parliament, Pratinidhi Sabha
- Incumbent
- Assumed office 26 March 2026
- Preceded by: Surya Man Dong Tamang
- Constituency: Kavrepalanchok 1

Personal details
- Citizenship: Nepalese
- Party: Rastriya Swatantra Party
- Education: Nepal Law Campus (LLB)
- Profession: Politician; Lawyer

Madhu Kumar Chaulagain (Note: Nepali: मधुकुमार चौलागाईं) is a Nepalese politician and lawyer, currently a member of parliament in the 7th House of Representatives. He was elected as a candidate of Rastriya Swatantra Party for Kavrepalanchok 1 constituency in the 2026 Nepalese General Election securing 29,618 votes and defeating his closest contender Gunraj Muktan of the Nepali Congress. He holds Bachelor of Laws from Nepal Law Campus. During 2013 to 2016, he remained as a Counselor at Appeal Court Bar Association.
