= Deepak Bahadur Singh =

Nepalese politician

Dipak Bahadur Singh
- दिपक बहादुर सिंह

Member of Parliament, Pratinidhi Sabha
- In office 22 December 2022 – 12 September 2025
- Preceded by: Krishna Prasad Dahal
- Succeeded by: Prakash Gautam
- Constituency: Makwanpur 1

Personal details
- Born: 26 July 1961 (age 64) Dhankuta, Nepal
- Party: Rastriya Prajatantra Party

Dipak Bahadur Singh (Nepali: दिपक बहादुर सिंह) is a Nepalese politician and member of the Rastriya Prajatantra Party. He was elected in 2022 from Makwanpur 1 to the House of Representatives.

== See also ==
- Rastriya Prajatantra Party
