= Surya Man Dong Tamang =

Nepali politician

Surya Man Dong
- सुर्यमान दोङ

Member of 2nd Federal Parliament of Nepal
- In office 9 January 2023 – 12 September 2025
- Preceded by: Ganga Bahadur Tamang, CPN (Maoist Centre)
- Succeeded by: Madhu Kumar Chaulagain, Rastriya Swatantra Party
- Constituency: Kavrepalanchok 1

Minister of State for Energy
- In office 8 November 2011 – 4 May 2012
- President: Ram Baran Yadav
- Prime Minister: Baburam Bhattarai
- Preceded by: Ramji Sharma
- Succeeded by: Satya Narayan Bhagat

Member of 1st Nepalese Constituent Assembly
- In office 28 May 2008 – 28 May 2012
- Preceded by: Shiva Bahadur Deuja (as Member of Parliament)
- Succeeded by: Tirtha Bahadur Lama
- Constituency: Kavrepalanchok 1

Member of Legislature Parliament
- In office 15 January 2007 – 18 January 2008
- Prime Minister: Girija Prasad Koirala
- Constituency: Kavre - Nominated; Communist Party of Nepal (Maoist) List

Personal details
- Born: SuryaMan Dong Tamang सुर्यमान दोङ तामाङ; 20 April 1970 (age 56) Kavrepalanchok District, Nepal
- Citizenship: Nepali
- Party: Nepali Communist Party
- Other political affiliations: CPN (Maoist Centre) (1994–2018; 2021–2025); Nepal Communist Party (2018–2021); CPN (Unity Centre) (1991–1994); CPN (Mashal) (1984–1991)
- Parents: Iman Singh Dong; Maili Maya Tamang

Surya Man Dong (Nepali: सुर्य मान दोङ; born 20 April 1970) is a Nepalese politician from the Nepali Communist Party. He has served as a member of the Nepalese legislature, including the Constituent Assembly and the House of Representatives, and was Minister of State for Energy in the cabinet of Prime Minister Baburam Bhattarai from November 2011 to May 2012.

== Early life and education ==
Surya Man Dong Tamang was born on 20 April 1970 in Mukpa, Temal Rural Municipality, Kavrepalanchok District, Bagmati Province, Nepal. He belongs to the Tamang ethnic community. He completed his formal education in Nepal before becoming involved in political activism at a young age.

== Political career ==
Dong became involved in left-wing politics during the 1990s and later joined the Communist Party of Nepal (Maoist). During the Nepalese civil conflict, he was active in the party’s political organization in Kavrepalanchok District.

Following the end of the conflict and the signing of the Comprehensive Peace Agreement, Dong continued his political career within the Unified Communist Party of Nepal (Maoist). He served in various party roles and later became a central committee member of the party, which was later reorganized as the CPN (Maoist Centre).

== Political affiliation ==
Following the 2025 unification of several left-wing parties in Nepal, Surya Man Dong Tamang is a member of the Nepali Communist Party. The party, formed on 5 November 2025, resulted from the merger of ten leftist parties and groups, including the Communist Party of Nepal (Maoist Centre), the Communist Party of Nepal (Unified Socialist), the Nepal Samajbadi Party, and others. Pushpa Kamal Dahal serves as the Coordinator of the Nepali Communist Party, with Madhav Kumar Nepal as its Joint-coordinator.

== Constituent Assembly ==
In the 2008 Nepalese Constituent Assembly election, Dong was elected as a member of the 1st Constituent Assembly representing Kavrepalanchok-1 constituency under the proportional representation system of the Unified Communist Party of Nepal (Maoist).

He participated in constitution-drafting related discussions and parliamentary committees during his tenure.

== Minister of State for Energy ==
In August 2011, Dong was appointed Minister of State for Energy in the cabinet led by Prime Minister Baburam Bhattarai. He served in this role until May 2012, during which the ministry focused on hydropower development and energy sector governance.

== Member of Parliament ==
In the 2022 Nepalese general election, Surya Man Tamang was elected to the House of Representatives from the Kavrepalanchok-1 constituency as a candidate of the CPN (Maoist Centre). He defeated Resham Bahadur Lama of the CPN (UML) by a margin of 3,964 votes.

== Views ==
Dong has stated that lawmakers should prioritize legislative responsibilities and policy formulation over development budget distribution, emphasizing institutional governance and expert-led implementation.
