= Badan Kumar Bhandari =

Nepalese politician

- बदन कुमार भण्डारी

Member of Parliament, Pratinidhi Sabha
- Incumbent
- Assumed office 26 March 2026
- Preceded by: Gokul Prasad Baskota
- Constituency: Kavrepalanchok 2

Personal details
- Citizenship: Nepalese
- Party: Rastriya Swatantra Party
- Profession: Politician

Badan Kumar Bhandari (Note: Nepali: बदन कुमार भण्डारी) is a Nepalese politician and entrepreneur who is serving as a member of parliament from the Rastriya Swatantra Party. He is a member in the 7th House of Representatives elected from Kavrepalanchok 2 constituency in the 2026 Nepalese General Election securing 53,344 votes and defeating Madhu Prasad Acharya of the Nepali Congress. He played a key role in the drafting/formulation of the E-commerce Bill.
