= Ram Hari Subedi =

Nepalese politician

- राम हरि सुवेदी

Member of Second Constituent Assembly of Nepal
- In office 21 January 2014 – 14 October 2017
- President: Ram Baran Yadav
- Prime Minister: Sushil Koirala
- Preceded by: Akal Bahadur Thing
- Succeeded by: Gokul Prasad Baskota
- Constituency: Kavrepalanchok 2

Personal details
- Party: CPN (UML)

Ram Hari Subedi (Nepali: राम हरि सुवेदी) is a member of the 2nd Nepalese Constituent Assembly. He won the Kavre - 2 seat at the CA assembly, 2013 from the Communist Party of Nepal (Unified Marxist–Leninist).
