= Bahadur Singh Lama cabinet =

- 5th Cabinet of Bagmati Province
- Date formed: 24 July 2024
- Date dissolved: 4 August 2025

People and organisations
- Governor: Yadav Chandra Sharma; Deepak Prakash Devkota
- Chief Minister: Bahadur Singh Lama
- No. of ministers: 9
- Ministers removed: 5 resigned
- Total no. of members: 14
- Member parties: Nepali Congress; CPN (UML)
- Status in legislature: Provincial Assembly 64 / 110 (58%)
- Opposition party: CPN (Maoist Centre)
- Opposition leader: Shalikram Jamkattel

History
- Election: 2022
- Legislature term: 5 years
- Predecessor: Shalikram Jamkattel cabinet
- Successor: Indra Bahadur Baniya cabinet

The Bahadur Singh Lama cabinet is the fifth cabinet of Bagmati Province. It was formed after national level alliance was formed between two major parties Nepali Congress and CPN (UML) citing the need of changes and amendment in constitution to bring up political stability in nation.

== Ministers by party ==
Party	Cabinet Ministers	Ministers of State	Total Ministers
Nepali Congress	8	0	8
CPN (UML)	6	0	6

== Council of ministers ==
S.N.	Portfolio	Name	Party	Tenure		
Cabinet ministers
1	Chief Minister	Bahadur Singh Lama	Nepali Congress	24 July 2024	4 August 2025	1 year, 11 days
2	Minister for Economic Affairs and Planning	Kundan Raj Kafle	Nepali Congress	25 July 2024	4 August 2025	1 year, 11 days
3	Minister for Internal Affairs and Law	Suraj Chandra Lamichhane	Nepali Congress	25 July 2024	4 August 2025	1 year, 11 days
4	Minister for Social Development	Hariprabha Khadgi	Nepali Congress	25 July 2024	4 August 2025	1 year, 11 days
5	Minister for Drinking Water, Energy and Irrigation	Shyam Bahadur Khadka	Nepali Congress	25 July 2024	4 August 2025	1 year, 11 days
6	Minister for Youth and Sports	Min Krishna Maharjan	Nepali Congress	25 July 2024	4 August 2025	1 year, 11 days
7	Minister for Culture, Tourism and Co-operatives	Bimal Thakuri	Nepali Congress	25 July 2024	4 August 2025	1 year, 11 days
8	Minister for Physical Infrastructure Development	Aman Kumar Maskey	CPN (UML)	25 July 2024	4 August 2025	1 year, 11 days
9	Minister for Agriculture and Livestock Development	Prakash Shrestha	CPN (UML)	25 July 2024	4 August 2025	1 year, 11 days
10	Minister for Labour, Employment and Transportation	Prem Bhakta Maharjan	CPN (UML)	25 July 2024	4 August 2025	1 year, 11 days
11	Minister for Industry, Commerce, Land and Administration	Shuk Maya Tamang	CPN (UML)	25 July 2024	4 August 2025	1 year, 11 days
12	Minister for Health	Kiran Thapa Magar	CPN (UML)	25 July 2024	4 August 2025	1 year, 11 days
13	Minister for Forest and Environment	Krishna Prasad Silwal	CPN (UML)	25 July 2024	4 August 2025	1 year, 11 days
14	Minister without portfolio	Madhu Kumar Shrestha	Nepali Congress	25 July 2024	4 August 2025	1 year, 11 days

== See also ==
- Third Hikmat Kumar Karki cabinet
- Satish Kumar Singh cabinet
- Second Surendra Raj Pandey cabinet
- Chet Narayan Acharya cabinet
- Yam Lal Kandel cabinet
- Second Kamal Bahadur Shah cabinet
