= Pukar Maharjan =

Nepalese politician

Honourable Pukar Maharjan
- पुकार महर्जन

Minister for Tourism, Industry and Co-operatives of Bagmati Province
- Incumbent
- Assumed office 21 May 2023
- Governor: Yadav Chandra Sharma

Member of the Bagmati Provincial Assembly
- Incumbent
- Assumed office 2017
- Constituency: Kathmandu 10(A)

Personal details
- Party: Nepali Congress

Pukar Maharjan (Nepali:पुकार महर्जन) is a Nepalese politician and Minister for Tourism, Industry and Co-operatives of Bagmati Province. Chitrakar also serves as a member of the Bagmati Provincial Assembly and was elected from Kathmandu 10 (A) constituency.
