= Gokul Prasad Baskota =

Nepalese Politician

- गोकुलप्रसाद बास्कोटा

Minister of Communications and Information Technologies
- In office February 12, 2018 – February 20, 2020
- President: Bidhya Devi Bhandari
- Prime Minister: KP Sharma Oli
- Preceded by: Mohan Bahadur Basnet
- Succeeded by: Yuba Raj Khatiwada

Minister of Urban Development
- In office January 2020 – February 2020
- President: Bidhya Devi Bhandari
- Prime Minister: KP Sharma Oli
- Preceded by: Mohammad Estiyak Rai
- Succeeded by: Basanta Kumar Nembwang

Member of the House of Representatives
- In office 4 March 2018 – 12 September 2025
- Preceded by: Ram Hari Subedi (as MCA)
- Succeeded by: Badan Kumar Bhandari
- Constituency: Kavrepalanchok 2

Personal details
- Born: 29 August 1970 (age 55)
- Party: CPN (UML)

Gokul Prasad Baskota (Nepali: गोकुलप्रसाद बास्कोटा) is a Nepali politician. He is a former Minister of Communication and Information Technology of Nepal who served as a Member of House Of Representatives (Nepal) elected from Kavrepalanchok-2, Province No. 3 for a second term.

== Controversies ==
Baskota is frequently known for his brash attitude, using derogatory language towards political opponents, and remarks attacking the free press.

An audio clip of Baskota bargaining for 700 million in bribes with an agent of a Swiss company based in Kathmandu over the procurement of security printing for the government was leaked to media outlets. Baskota was accused of demanding a Rs 700 million bribe in exchange for a contract to print e-passports in Nepal. He subsequently resigned his ministerial position. He shortly filed a defamation lawsuit against Vijay Mishra.
