= Kavrepalanchok 2 =

Parliamentary constituency in Bagmati Province, Nepal

- Parliamentary constituency
- Kavrepalanchok 2 in Bagmati Province
- Province: Bagmati Province
- District: Kavrepalanchok District
- Population: 206,986
- Electorate: 165,511
- Major settlements: Banepa; Panchkhal; Dhulikhel; Mandandeupur

Current constituency
- Created: 1991
- Seats: 1
- Party: RSP
- Member of Parliament: Badan Kumar Bhandari
- Local levels: Bhumlu Rural Municipality; Bethanchowk Rural Municipality; Mandandeupur Municipality; Panchkhal Municipality; Banepa Municipality; Dhulikhel Municipality (part); Panauti Municipality (part)
- Member of the Provincial Assembly 2(A): Laxman Lamsal, NCP
- Member of the Provincial Assembly 2(B): Kanchan Chandra Bade, Congress

Kavrepalanchok 2 is one of two parliamentary constituencies of Kavrepalanchok District in Nepal. This constituency came into existence on the Constituency Delimitation Commission (CDC) report submitted on 31 August 2017.

== Incorporated areas ==
Kavrepalanchok 2 parliamentary constituency incorporates Bhumlu Rural Municipality, Bethanchowk Rural Municipality, Mandandeupur Municipality, Panchkhal Municipality, Banepa Municipality wards 1–7 of Dhulikhel Municipality and wards 1–3, 11 and 12 of Panauti Municipality.

== Assembly segments ==
It encompasses the following Bagmati Provincial Assembly segment

- Kavrepalanchok 2(A)
- Kavrepalanchok 2(B)

== Members of Parliament ==
=== Parliament/Constituent Assembly ===
Election	Member	Party
1991	Shiva Bahadur Deuja	CPN (Unified Marxist–Leninist)
1994	Keshab Prasad Badal	CPN (Unified Marxist–Leninist)
1999	Shiva Prasad Humagain	Nepali Congress
2008	Akal Bahadur Thing	CPN (Maoist)
January 2009	Akal Bahadur Thing	UCPN (Maoist)
2013	Ram Hari Subedi	CPN (Unified Marxist–Leninist)
2017	Gokul Prasad Baskota	CPN (Unified Marxist–Leninist)
May 2018	Gokul Prasad Baskota	Nepal Communist Party
March 2021	Gokul Prasad Baskota	CPN (Unified Marxist–Leninist)
2022	Gokul Prasad Baskota	CPN (Unified Marxist–Leninist)
2026	Badan Kumar Bhandari	Rastriya Swatantra Party

5 Times	1 Time	1 Time	1 Time
CPN (UML)	Congress	CPN (Maoist)	RSP

=== Provincial Assembly ===
==== 2(A) ====
Election	Member	Party
2017	Laxman Lamsal	CPN (Unified Marxist–Leninist)
May 2018	Laxman Lamsal	Nepal Communist Party
March 2021	Laxman Lamsal	CPN (Unified Marxist–Leninist)
August 2021	Laxman Lamsal	CPN (Unified Socialist)
2022	Laxman Lamsal	CPN (Unified Socialist)
November 2025	Laxman Lamsal	Nepali Communist Party

==== 2(B) ====
Election	Member	Party
2017	Basundhara Humagain	CPN (Unified Marxist–Leninist)
May 2018	Basundhara Humagain	Nepal Communist Party
March 2021	Basundhara Humagain	CPN (Unified Marxist–Leninist)
August 2021	Basundhara Humagain	CPN (Unified Socialist)
2022	Kanchan Chandra Bade	Nepali Congress

== Election results ==
=== Election in the 2020s ===
==== 2026 general election ====
Candidate	Party	Votes	%	+/–
Badan Kumar Bhandari	Rastriya Swatantra Party	53,344	53.57	▲42.92
Madhu Prasad Acharya	Nepali Congress	17,868	17.94	▼21.85
Ashok Kumar Byanju Shrestha	CPN (UML)	13,940	14.00	▼31.70
Basundhara Humagain	Nepali Communist Party	8,107	8.14	New entry
Jyotsana Saiju	Ujyaalo Nepal Party	3,749	3.76	New entry
Ranjib Shrestha	Rastriya Prajatantra Party	1,125	1.13	▼0.82
Muna Tamang	Nepal Workers Peasants Party	428	0.43	▼0.39
Kancha Ram Ghising	Shram Sanskriti Party	400	0.40	New entry
Tanka Bahadur Lama	Nepal Communist Party (Maoist)	146	0.15	
Ramesh Bahadur Gharti Chhetri	Pragatisheel Loktantrik Party	144	0.14	New entry
Aasha Tamang	Independent	59	0.06	
Subarna Bikram Thapa	Rastriya Janamorcha	39	0.04	
Rakam Lama (Tamang)	Janata Samajbadi Party, Nepal	32	0.03	▼0.13
Rajan Thapa	Nepal Communist Party (Sainyukta)	32	0.03	
Dilli Prasad Neupane	Independent	31	0.03	
Umesh Tamang	Independent	28	0.03	
Umesh Thapa	Independent	26	0.03	
Sita Ram Mainali	Independent	21	0.02	
Sukaman Tamang	National Republic Nepal	15	0.02	
Bishnu Kumar Shrestha	Independent	13	0.01	
Ganesh Prasad Adhikari	Independent	11	0.01	
Hari Bahadur Thapa	Miteri Party Nepal	10	0.01	
Lenin Bista	Independent	8	0.01	
Keshab Raj Timalsena	Independent	4	0.00	
Total		99,580	100.00	–
Valid votes		99,580	95.16	
Invalid/blank votes		5,062	4.84	
Total votes		104,642	100.00	
Registered voters/turnout		165,511	63.22	
Majority		35,476		
Rastriya Swatantra Party gain				

Total Voters: 1,65,511 · Votes Cast: 1,04,642 (63.22%) · Valid Votes: 99,580 (95.16%) · Invalid Votes: 5,062 (4.84%)

==== 2022 general election ====
Candidate	Party	Votes	%
Gokul Prasad Baskota	CPN (UML)	45,345	45.70
Shiva Prasad Humagain	Nepali Congress	39,482	39.79
Dinesh Humagain	Rastriya Swatantra Party	10,573	10.65
Yasu Ale Magar	Rastriya Prajatantra Party	1,933	1.95
Krishna Kumar Baidhya	Nepal Workers Peasants Party	802	0.81
Manoj Pandit	Independent	173	0.17
Siddhi Bahadur Joshi	People's Socialist Party, Nepal	162	0.16
Shwoyambhu Raj Shakya	Independent	115	0.12
Ganga Lal Shrestha	Nepal Naulo Janbadi Party	100	0.10
Shesh Raj Lamichhane	Independent	100	0.10
Yok Bahadur Ghising	Communist Party of Nepal (Maoist Socialist)	99	0.10
Achamma Lama	Mongol National Organisation	92	0.09
Uttar Kumar Lama	Communist Party of Nepal (Paribartan)	92	0.09
Bodh Nath Neupane	Independent	83	0.08
Krishna Khatri	Independent	45	0.05
Bijay Tamang	Sanghiya Loktantrik Rastriya Manch	35	0.04
Total		99,231	100.00
Valid votes		99,231	96.59
Invalid/blank votes		3,498	3.41
Total votes		102,729	100.00
Registered voters/turnout		157,442	65.25
Majority		5,863	
CPN (UML) hold			

Total Voters: 1,57,442 · Votes Cast: 1,02,729 (65.25%) · Valid Votes: 99,231 (96.59%) · Invalid Votes: 3,498 (3.41%)

=== Election in the 2010s ===
==== 2017 legislative elections ====
Party	Candidate	Votes
CPN (Unified Marxist–Leninist)	Gokul Prasad Baskota	55,526
Nepali Congress	Madhu Prasad Acharya	36,753
Nepali Janata Dal	Saraswati Tripathi	1,106
Bibeksheel Sajha Party	Bilash Thapa	877
CPN (Marxist–Leninist)	Surath Chaulagain	725
Nepal Workers Peasants Party	Krishna Kumar Baidhya	707
Naya Shakti Party, Nepal	Krishna Kumar Bhandari	315
Rastriya Janata Party Nepal	Pradeep Kumar Prajapati	206
Deshbhakta Janaganatantrik Morcha Nepal	Saurav Raj Kayastha	153
Federal Socialist Forum, Nepal	Siddhi Bahadur Joshi	127
Independent	Sudarshan Humagain	61
Invalid votes		4,198
Result	CPN (UML) hold	
Source: Election Commission

==== 2017 Nepalese provincial elections ====
===== Kavrepalanchok 2(A) =====
Candidate	Party	Votes	%
Laxman Lamsal	CPN (Unified Marxist–Leninist)	27,621	60.91
Sundar Mani Acharya	Nepali Congress	16,589	36.58
Hari Ram Lamsal	Bibeksheel Sajha Party	458	1.01
Resham Lal Shrestha	Naya Shakti Party, Nepal	252	0.56
Keshab Prasad Ojha	Deshbhakta Janaganatantrik Morcha Nepal	158	0.35
Dhan Bahadur Tamang	Nepal Majdoor Kisan Party	137	0.30
Indra Lal Lama	Federal Socialist Forum, Nepal	135	0.30
Total		45,350	100.00
Valid votes		45,350	97.17
Invalid/blank votes		1,321	2.83
Total votes		46,671	100.00
Registered voters/turnout		67,201	69.45
Majority		11,032	
CPN (Unified Marxist–Leninist) gain			

===== Kavrepalanchok 2(B) =====
Candidate	Party	Votes	%
Basundhara Humagain	CPN (Unified Marxist–Leninist)	28,677	54.64
Kanchan Chandra Bade	Nepali Congress	21,780	41.50
Hari Prasad Manandhar	Nepal Majdoor Kisan Party	631	1.20
Bijay Kumar Tamang	Bibeksheel Sajha Party	545	1.04
Ram Chandra Shrestha	CPN (Marxist–Leninist)	452	0.86
Pawan Raj Karanjit	Naya Shakti Party, Nepal	189	0.36
Sabar Kumar Prajapati	Rastriya Janata Party Nepal	129	0.25
Rajendra Khadgi	Federal Socialist Forum, Nepal	85	0.16
Total		52,488	100.00
Valid votes		52,488	97.04
Invalid/blank votes		1,600	2.96
Total votes		54,088	100.00
Registered voters/turnout		71,313	75.85
Majority		6,897	
CPN (Unified Marxist–Leninist) gain			

==== 2013 Constituent Assembly election ====
Candidate	Party	Votes	%
Ram Hari Subedi	Communist Party of Nepal (Unified Marxist–Leninist)	13,510	35.57
Shiva Prasad Humagain	Nepali Congress	11,040	29.07
Akal Bahadur Thing	Unified Communist Party of Nepal (Maoist)	5,913	15.57
Ganesh Lama	Madheshi Jana Adhikar Forum, Nepal (Loktantrik)	4,908	12.92
Arju Kumar K.C.	Rastriya Prajatantra Party Nepal	794	2.09
Komal Bahadur Basnet	CPN (Marxist–Leninist)	614	1.62
Tulku Lama	Rastriya Prajatantra Party	397	1.05
Badri Prasad Timalsina	Nepali Janata Dal	219	0.58
Gyan Bahadur Tamang	Federal Socialist Party	200	0.53
Khadga Bahadur Jimba	Sanghiya Gantantrik Samajwadi Party Nepal	100	0.26
Raju Tamang	Rastriya Janamukti Party	60	0.16
Navaraj Ghorasaini	Independent	43	0.11
Buddhi Man Syangtan	Liberal Democratic Party	41	0.11
Sanu Babu Khatri	Sadbhavana Party	37	0.10
Krishna Bahadur Tamang	Nepal Workers and Peasants Party	36	0.09
Suntala Kaji Shrestha	Nepa Rastriya Party	36	0.09
Jeevan Kumar Tamang	Janamorcha Nepal	31	0.08
Total		37,979	100.00
Registered voters/turnout		51,355	–
Majority		2,470	
Communist Party of Nepal (Unified Marxist–Leninist) gain			

=== Election in the 2000s ===
==== 2008 Constituent Assembly election ====
Candidate	Party	Votes	%
Akal Bahadur Thing	CPN (Maoist)	18,207	38.20
Keshab Prasad Badal	Communist Party of Nepal (Unified Marxist-Leninist)	11,814	24.78
Tirtha Bahadur Paskhala	Nepali Congress	10,788	22.63
Komal Bahadur Basnet	CPN (Marxist–Leninist)	2,091	4.39
Satyaman Lama	Rastriya Janashakti Party	2,050	4.30
Gyan Sagar Lama	Janamorcha Nepal	1,080	2.27
Tulku Lama	Rastriya Prajatantra Party	601	1.26
Resham Bahadur Lama	Rastriya Prajatantra Party Nepal	416	0.87
Rita Dhungana	Rastriya Janata Dal	210	0.44
Bhoj Raj Khanal	Communist Party of Nepal (Unified)	149	0.31
Yok Bahadur Ghising	Tamsaling Nepal Rastriya Dal	115	0.24
Nani Maya Tamang	Nepal Workers and Peasants Party	77	0.16
Chamar Sing Tamang	Nawa Janabadi Morcha	34	0.07
Purna Bahadur Timalsina	Independent	20	0.04
Surya Bahadur Thapa	Nepal Samata Party	16	0.03
Total		47,668	100.00
Valid votes		47,668	95.02
Invalid/blank votes		2,496	4.98
Total votes		50,164	100.00
Registered voters/turnout		76,884	65.25
Majority		6,393	
CPN (Maoist) hold			

=== Election in the 1990s ===
==== 1999 legislative elections ====
Candidate	Party	Votes	%
Shiva Prasad Humagain	Nepali Congress	25,390	42.84
Keshab Prasad Badal	CPN (UML)	24,401	41.17
Laxmi Narsingh Bade Shrestha	Rastriya Prajatantra Party	5,201	8.78
Tri Bikram Karmacharya	Communist Party of Nepal (Marxist–Leninist)	1,796	3.03
Hari Prasad Manandhar	Nepal Majdoor Kissan Party	1,176	1.98
Arju Kumar K.C.	Rastriya Prajatantra Party (Chand)	825	1.39
Sudarshan Humagain	Independent	271	0.46
Min Bahadur Shahi	Independent	155	0.26
Surya Bahadur Thapa	Independent	50	0.08
Total		59,265	100.00
Valid votes		59,265	97.44
Invalid/blank votes		1,557	2.56
Total votes		60,822	100.00
Registered voters/turnout		83,364	72.96
Majority		989	
Nepali Congress gain			

==== 1994 legislative elections ====
Party	Candidate	Votes
CPN (Unified Marxist–Leninist)	Keshab Prasad Badal	19,938
Nepali Congress	Bishnu Humagain	12,582
Rastriya Prajatantra Party	Resham Lal Baidhya	10,105
Samyukta Jana Morcha Nepal	Gopi Krishna Thapaliya	2,034
Nepal Workers Peasants Party	Ram Sharan K.C.	1,251
Independent	Bhata Rayamajhi	147
Result	CPN (UML) hold	
Source: Election Commission

==== 1991 legislative elections ====
Party	Candidate	Votes	%	Status
CPN (Unified Marxist–Leninist)	Keshab Prasad Badal	16,325	47.91	Elected
Nepali Congress	Gopaldas Bade	10,002	29.36	
Rastriya Prajatantra Party (Thapa)	Gopal Singh Musyaju			
Rastriya Prajatantra Party (Chand)	Ram Bahadur K.C.			
Samyukta Jana Morcha Nepal	Ganesh Das Ulak			
Nepal Workers Peasants Party	Krishna Kumar Vaidya			
Janata Dal (Samajbadi Prajatantrik)	Rup Bahadur Bista			
Independent	Krishna Bahadur Karmacharya			
Independent	Rabindra Khadka			
Result	CPN (UML) gain			

== See also ==
- List of parliamentary constituencies of Nepal
