= Masina Khadka =

Honourable Masina Khadka
- मसिना खड्का

Minister for Forest and Environment of Bagmati Province
- Incumbent
- Assumed office 21 May 2023
- Governor: Yadav Chandra Sharma

Member of the Bagmati Provincial Assembly
- Incumbent
- Assumed office 2023
- Constituency: Sindhupalchowk 1(A)

Personal details
- Party: Nepali Congress

Masina Khadka (Nepali:मसिना खड्का) is a Nepalese politician and Minister for Forest and Environment of Bagmati Province. Khadka also serves as a member of the Bagmati Provincial Assembly and was elected from Sindhupalchowk 1(A) constituency.
