= Makawanpur Multiple Campus =

Public college in Nepal

Coordinates: 27.433°N 85.040°E

Makwanpur Multiple Campus, Hetauda
- मकवानपुर बहुमुखी क्याम्पस
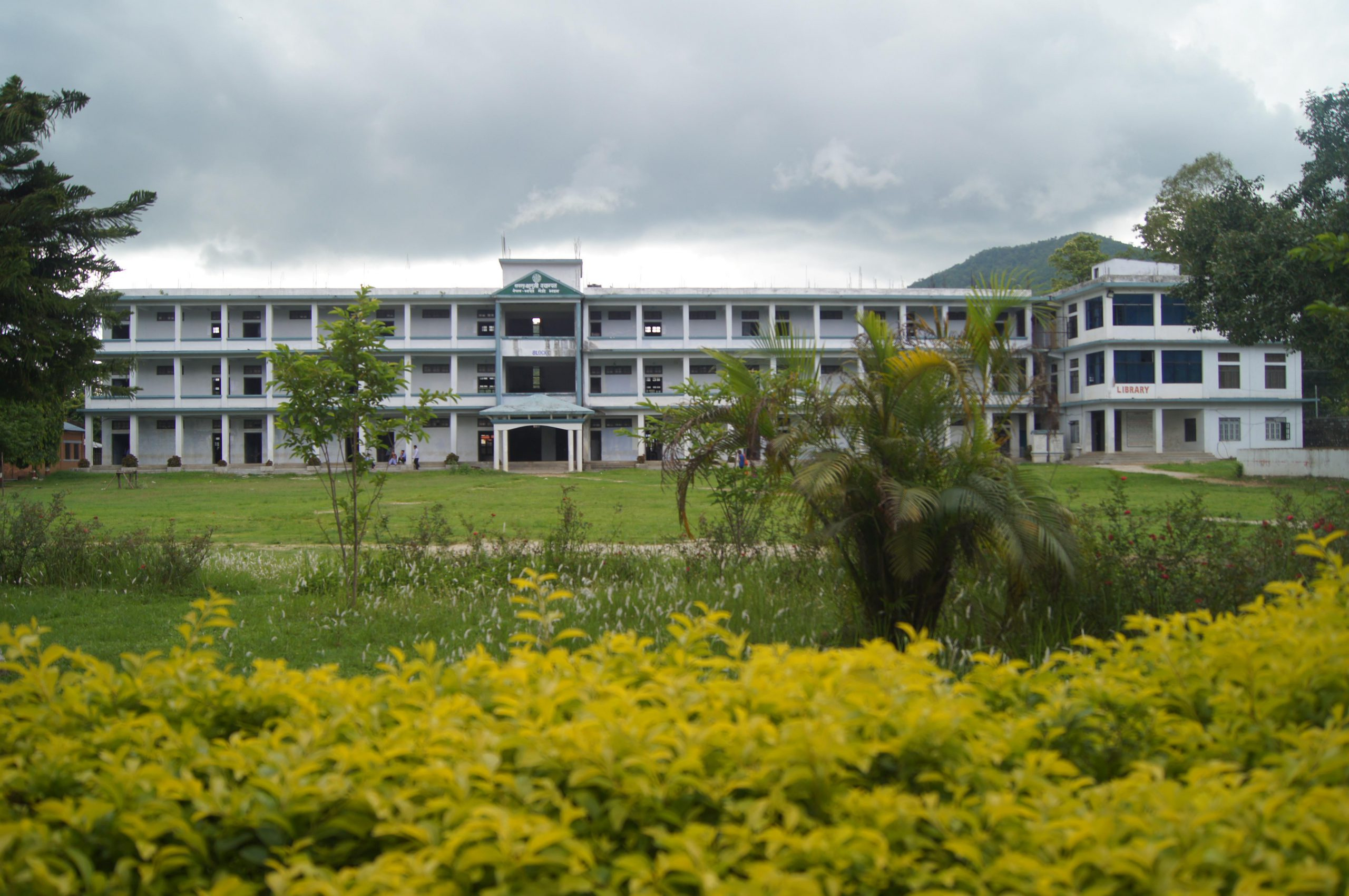
- Type: Public
- Established: 1981
- Chairman: Ananta Prasad Paudel
- Academic staff: 92 professors (2019)
- Students: 8,000+
- Address: Nagarpalika Road, Hetauda-2, Hetauda, Nepal
- Campus: Located in Ward no. 2, Hetauda
- Website: https://mmchetauda.edu.np

Makawanpur Multiple Campus (Nepali: मकवानपुर बहुमुखी क्याम्पस) is a non-profit public institution of higher learning in Hetauda sub-metropolis of central Nepal. It is one of the largest regional campuses of Tribhuvan University that caters to thousands of students. It is located in ward no. 2 of Hetauda sub metropolitan municipality.

== Activities and academics ==
The Makawanpur Multiple Campus provides undergraduate, graduate and postgraduate degrees in science, humanities and business studies, among others.

The campus is a venue for vibrant student politics, mainly among affiliate student unions of major political parties. It is one of the largest colleges by voter turnout in student union elections, officially conducted by Tribhuvan University. ANNFSU leader Kumar KC is the incumbent president of the campus student union. Student protests often take a violent turn in the campus. In August 2015, students affiliated to CPN (Maoist Centre) started fire in the offices of the chair and vice-chair by throwing Molotov cocktail, during a meeting of the Campus Management Committee.

== Leadership ==
The campus is run by the Campus Management Committee comprising the chief district officer of Makawanpur District and representatives from major political parties, Makawanpur District Development Committee, Hetauda municipal council, district chamber of commerce, Narayani Transport Enterprise Association as well as other distinguished members of the civil society. As of February 2018, Dormani Poudel, who was later elected as the chief minister of Bagmati Province, was the chairperson of the committee, having been in the role for years. As of 2019, the faculty consisted of 92 professors in total.

== History ==
The campus was established in 1981.

In 2007, two new buildings, one of them the college library, constructed using the grant (amounting to Rs. 20.36 million) from the Government of India came into operation. They were inaugurated by the then Indian ambassador to Nepal Shiv Shankar Mukherjee.

Dormani Poudel, in 2019, revealed that an expert committee had recommended the campus for upgrade into a university.
