= Ramkrishna Chitrakar =

Nepali politician

Honourable Ramkrishna Chitrakar
- रामकृष्ण चित्रकार

Minister without portfolio of Bagmati Province
- Incumbent
- Assumed office 21 May 2023
- Governor: Yadav Chandra Sharma

Member of the Bagmati Provincial Assembly
- Incumbent
- Assumed office 1 February 2018
- Constituency: Lalitpur 2 (B)

Personal details
- Party: Nepali Congress

Ram Krishna Chitrakar (Nepali:रामकृष्ण चित्रकार) is a Nepalese politician and Minister without portfolio of Bagmati Province. Chitrakar also serves as a member of the Bagmati Provincial Assembly and was elected from Lalitpur 2 (B) constituency.
