= Uttam Joshi =

Nepalese politician

Honourable Uttam Joshi
- उत्तम जोशी

Minister for Health of Bagmati Province
- Incumbent
- Assumed office 21 May 2023
- Governor: Yadav Chandra Sharma

Member of the Bagmati Provincial Assembly
- Incumbent
- Assumed office 2023
- Constituency: Chitwan 2 (B)

Personal details
- Party: Nepali Congress

Uttam Joshi (Nepali:उत्तम जोशी) is a Nepalese politician and Minister for Health of Bagmati Province. Chitrakar also serves as a member of the Bagmati Provincial Assembly and was elected from Chitwan 2 (B) constituency.
