= Bhumidanda =

Coordinates: 27°32′N 85°16′E

Bhumidanda भूमिडाँडा
- Village development committee
- Interactive map of Bhumidanda
- Country: Nepal
- Province: Bagmati Province
- District: Kabhrepalanchok District

Population (1991)
  - Total: 3,383
- Time zone: UTC+5:45 (Nepal Time)

Bhumidanda is a village development committee in Kabhrepalanchok District in Bagmati Province of central Nepal. At the time of the 1991 Nepal census it had a population of 3,383 and had 630 houses in it.
