= Tirtha Bahadur Lama =

Nepali politician

Honourable Tirtha Bahadur Lama
- तिर्थ बहादुर लामा
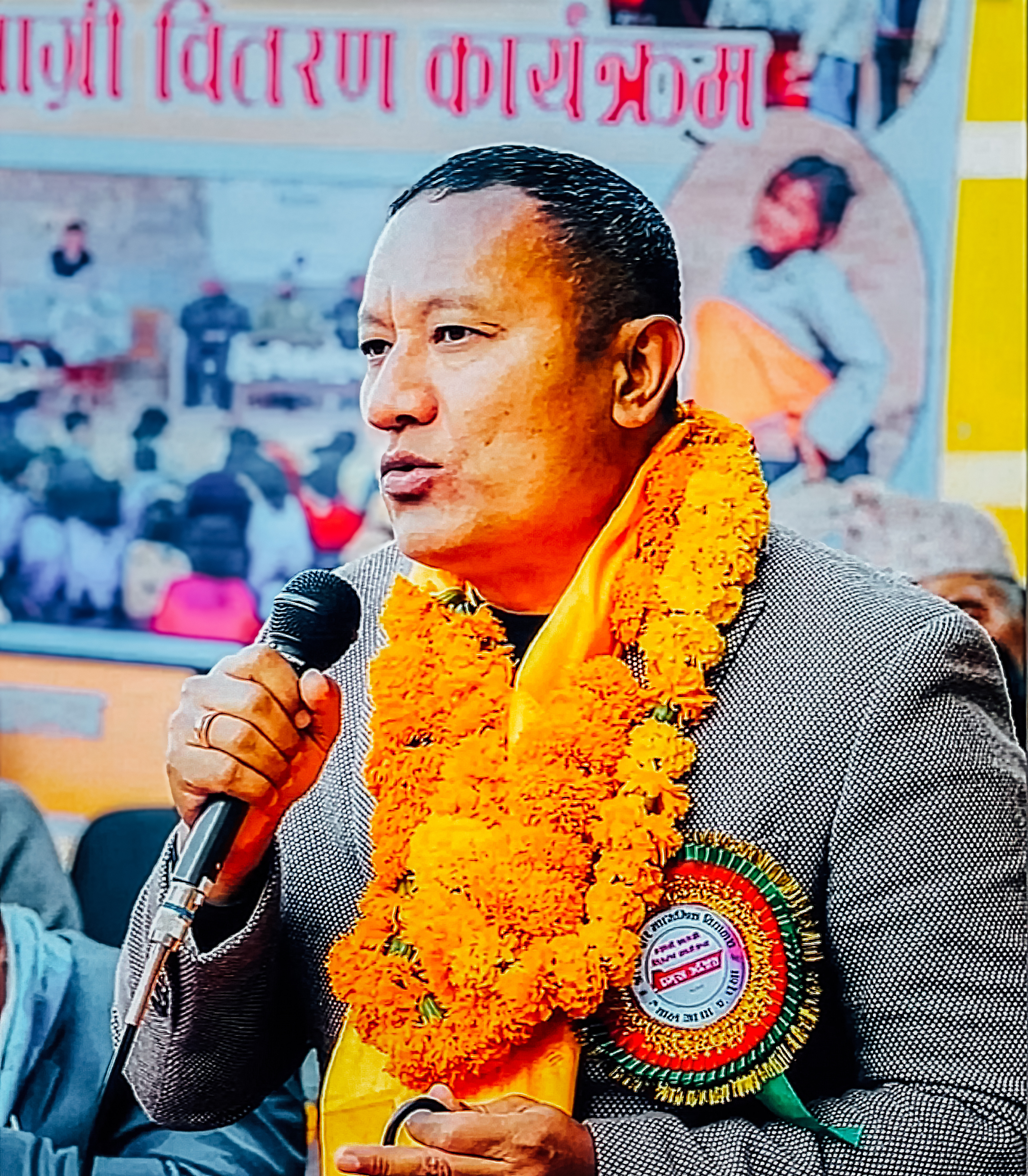

Member of Bagmati Provincial Assembly
- Incumbent
- Assumed office 2 January 2023
- President: Ram Chandra Paudel
- Governor: Yadav Chandra Sharma, Deepak Prasad Devkota
- Preceded by: Chandra Bahadur Lama
- Constituency: Kavrepalanchowk 1(B)

Minister of Drinking Water, Energy and Irrigation of Bagmati Province
- In office 9 April 2023 – 6 March 2024
- President: Ram Chandra Paudel
- Governor: Yadav Chandra Sharma
- Chief Minister: Shalikram Jamkattel
- Preceded by: Eka Lal Shrestha
- Succeeded by: Shyam Bahadur Khadka

Member of the Constituent Assembly
- In office 21 January 2014 – 14 October 2017
- President: Ram Baran Yadav
- Prime Minister: Sushil Koirala
- Preceded by: Surya Man Dong Tamang
- Succeeded by: Ganga Bahadur Tamang
- Constituency: Kavrepalanchok 1

Central Committee Member, Nepali Congress
- Incumbent
- Assumed office October 2026
- President: Gagan Kumar Thapa

Personal details
- Born: June 9, 1974 (age 52) Lekhapani, Roshi, Kavre, Nepal
- Citizenship: Nepali
- Party: Nepali Congress (2006-present)
- Other political affiliations: Rastriya Prajatantra Party (until 2006)
- Parent: Keshar Bahadur Lama (father)
- Profession: Politician

Tirtha Bahadur Lama (Nepali: तिर्थ बहादुर लामा) is a Nepali politician affiliated with the Nepali Congress. He has served as a member of the Bagmati Provincial Assembly since 2023 and was Minister for Water, Energy and Irrigation of Bagmati Province from April 2023 to March 2024. He is also a member of the Nepali Congress Central Committee, having been elected under the Indigenous category at the party's 15th General Convention.

He previously served as a member of Nepal's 2nd Nepalese Constituent Assembly, elected in the 2013 election from Kavre-1 constituency, where he also served on the Parliamentary Committee on Industry, Commerce and Consumer Protection.

== Early life and background ==
Lama was born in Lekhapani, Roshi in Kavre, Nepal.

== Political career ==
Lama was elected to Nepal's 2nd Constituent Assembly in the 2013 election from Kavrepalanchok-1 as a Nepali Congress candidate. He defeated Surya Man Dong Tamang of the Unified Communist Party of Nepal (Maoist) in that election. The Constituent Assembly was responsible for drafting Nepal's constitution.

== Provincial politics (Bagmati Province) ==
Lama was elected to the Bagmati Provincial Assembly in 2022 and has also served as the Nepali Congress district president for Kavrepalanchok.

== Minister for Water, Energy and Irrigation ==
Lama was appointed Minister for Water, Energy and Irrigation of Bagmati Province on 9 April 2023.

During his tenure he participated in policy discussions on water supply and sanitation and engaged in coordination between provincial and federal authorities His tenure ended in March 2024 following political changes in the province.

== Controversies ==
Lama has been mentioned in reporting related to environmental concerns in Kavrepalanchok.

A report by Nepali Times linked political actors, including Lama, to companies involved in crusher and sand mining operations associated with environmental degradation and flooding impacts.
