= Indra Bahadur Baniya =

Nepali politician

Honourable Indra Bahadur Baniya
- इन्द्रबहादुर बानियाँ

6th Chief Minister of Bagmati Province
- In office 5 August 2025 – 17 August 2026
- President: Ram Chandra Paudel
- Prime Minister: K.P. Sharma Oli; Sushila Karki; Balendra Shah
- Governor: Yadav Chandra Sharma
- Preceded by: Bahadur Singh Lama
- Succeeded by: Kiran Thapa Magar

Minister of State for Home Affairs
- In office 9 April 2023 – 6 March 2024
- Prime Minister: Pushpa Kamal Dahal
- Home Minister: Bimalendra Nidhi

Member of Bagmati Provincial Assembly
- Incumbent
- Assumed office 2022
- Preceded by: Position established
- Constituency: Makwanpur 1(B)

Member of Constituent Assembly
- In office 2013–2017
- President: Ram Baran Yadav
- Constituency: Makwanpur 1

Personal details
- Born: 30 July 1970 (age 56) Makwanpur
- Party: Nepali Congress
- Education: Makwanpur Multiple Campus

Indra Bahadur Baniya (born 30 July 1970) is a Nepalese politician who served as Chief Minister of Bagmati Province from August 2025 to August 2026. Baniya is elected member of the Bagmati Provincial Assembly from Makwanupr 1 (B). He had previously served as the Minister of state for Home Affairs.

During the 2025 Nepalese Gen Z protests his house and office in Hetauda were torched by protesters.
