= Dipendra Shrestha =

Nepalese politician

Honourable Dipendra Shrestha
- दिपेन्द्र श्रेष्ठ

Minister for Culture and Tourism of Bagmati Province
- Incumbent
- Assumed office 24 December 2021
- Preceded by: Position created

Member of Provincial Assembly of Bagmati Province
- Incumbent
- Assumed office 2017
- President: Bidya Devi Bhandari
- Prime Minister: Sher Bahadur Deuba
- Constituency: Kathmandu 1(A)

Personal details
- Born: Kathmandu, Nepal
- Party: Nepali Congress

Dipendra Shrestha (Nepali: दीपेन्द्र श्रेष्ठ) is a Nepalese politician belonging to Nepali Congress. He is a member of Provincial Assembly of Bagmati Province.

Shrestha is currently serving as Minister for Culture and Tourism of Bagmati Province.

== Electoral history ==
=== 2017 Nepalese provincial elections ===
Kathmandu 1(A)
Party	Candidate	Votes
Nepali Congress	Dipendra Shrestha	6,231
CPN (Unified Marxist–Leninist)	Bishnu Kumari Bhusal	4,618
Bibeksheel Sajha Party	Samikchya Baskota	4,343
Others		870
Invalid votes		274
Result	Congress gain	
Source: Election Commission

== See also ==
- Prakash Man Singh
- Nepali Congress
