= Dinesh Chandra Devkota =

Dinesh Chandra Devkota (Nepali - दिनेश चन्द्र देवकोटा ) is a Nepalese Engineer and former Vice-Chairman of National Planning Commission of Nepal from 2008 to 2011. He did Ph D from Saitama University, Japan in 2005 and his MSc from Southern Illinois University, United States of America in 1996.

He is president of Nepal Intellectuals' Council.

He was born in Gorkha district and is married to Prabha Pokhrel, a sociologist. He has a son, Prabesh Devkota and a daughter, Dikshya Devkota.
