= Makwanpur 1 =

Parliamentary constituency in Bagmati Province, Nepal

- Parliamentary constituency
- Makwanpur 1 in Bagmati Province
- Province: Bagmati Province
- District: Makwanpur District

Current constituency
- Created: 1991
- Party: Rastriya Swatantra Party
- Member of Parliament: Prakash Gautam

Makwanpur 1 is one of two parliamentary constituencies of Makwanpur District in Nepal. This constituency came into existence on the Constituency Delimitation Commission (CDC) report submitted on 31 August 2017.

== Incorporated areas ==
Makwanpur 1 parliamentary constituency incorporates Bagmati Rural Municipality, Bakaiya Rural Municipality, wards 1–4 Makawanpurgadhi Rural Municipality and, wards 2, 4–10 and 12–18 of Hetauda Sub-metropolitan City.

== Assembly segments ==
It encompasses the following Bagmati Provincial Assembly segment

- Makwanpur 1(A)
- Makwanpur 1(B)

== Members of Parliament ==
=== Parliament/Constituent Assembly ===
Election	Member	Party
1991	Krishna Prasad Dahal	CPN (Unified Marxist–Leninist)
1994	Kamal Thapa	Rastriya Prajatantra Party
1999	Krishna Prasad Dahal	CPN (Unified Marxist–Leninist)
2008	Dil Bahadur Ghising	CPN (Maoist)
January 2009	Dil Bahadur Ghising	UCPN (Maoist)
2013	Indra Bahadur Baniya	Nepali Congress
2017	Krishna Prasad Dahal	CPN (Unified Marxist–Leninist)
May 2018	Krishna Prasad Dahal	Nepal Communist Party
March 2021	Krishna Prasad Dahal	CPN (Unified Marxist–Leninist)
2022	Deepak Bahadur Singh	Rastriya Prajatantra Party
2026	Prakash Gautam	Rastriya Swatantra Party

=== Provincial Assembly ===
==== 1(A) ====
Election	Member	Party
2017	Prem Bahadur Pulami	CPN (Maoist Centre)
May 2018	Prem Bahadur Pulami	Nepal Communist Party

==== 1(B) ====
Election	Member	Party
2017	Dormani Poudel	CPN (Unified Marxist–Leninist)
May 2018	Dormani Poudel	Nepal Communist Party

== Election results ==
=== Election in the 2020s ===
==== 2022 general election ====
Candidate	Party	Votes	%
Deepak Bahadur Singh	Rastriya Prajatantra Party	27,851	31.95
Mahalaxmi Upadhyaya	Nepali Congress	25,464	29.21
Kamal Thapa	CPN (UML)	25,460	29.21
Taka Raj Thapa	Rastriya Swatantra Party	5,703	6.54
Others		2,696	3.09
Total		87,174	100.00
Majority		2,387	
Rastriya Prajatantra Party gain			

=== Election in the 2010s ===
==== 2017 legislative elections ====
Party	Candidate	Votes
CPN (Unified Marxist–Leninist)	Krishna Prasad Dahal	40,631
Rastriya Prajatantra Party	Kamal Thapa	34,658
CPN (Marxist–Leninist)	Kumar Bahadur Sanjel	1,419
Bibeksheel Sajha Party	Saroj Koirala	1,356
Others		1,662
Invalid votes		4,343
Result	CPN (UML) gain	
Source: Election Commission

==== 2017 Nepalese provincial elections ====
===== Makwanpur 1(A) =====
Party	Candidate	Votes
CPN (Maoist Centre)	Prem Bahadur Pulami	21,629
Nepali Congress	Dharma Raj Lammichane	18,775
Others		1,033
Invalid votes		1,384
Result	Maoist Centre gain	
Source: Election Commission

===== Makwanpur 1(B) =====
Party	Candidate	Votes
CPN (Unified Marxist–Leninist)	Dormani Poudel	20,703
Nepali Congress	Ashok Raj Shakya	16,581
Bibeksheel Sajha Party	Pathiba Dangol	1,614
Others		1,020
Invalid votes		1,214
Result	CPN (UML) gain	
Source: Election Commission

==== 2013 Constituent Assembly election ====
Party	Candidate	Votes
Nepali Congress	Indra Bahadur Baniya	11,888
CPN (Unified Marxist–Leninist)	Ana Raj Jarga Magar	9,522
UCPN (Maoist)	Surkesh Ghalan	5,789
Rastriya Prajatantra Party Nepal	Pralita Thapa	5,375
Others		1,257
Result	Nepali Congress Gain	
Source: NepalNews

=== Election in the 2000s ===
==== 2008 Constituent Assembly election ====
Party	Candidate	Votes
CPN (Maoist)	Dil Bahadur Ghising	21,027
CPN (Unified Marxist–Leninist)	Badi Prasad Lamsal	9,561
Nepali Congress	Indra Bahadur Baniya	8,561
CPN (Marxist–Leninist)	Ram Chandra Dulal	2,617
Others		2,016
Invalid votes		2,424
Result	Maoist gain	
Source: Election Commission

=== Election in the 1990s ===
==== 1999 legislative elections ====
Party	Candidate	Votes
CPN (Unified Marxist–Leninist)	Krishna Prasad Dahal	20,442
Rastriya Prajatantra Party	Kamal Thapa	15,985
Nepali Congress	Omu Tempa Lama	8,773
Rastriya Prajatantra Party (Chand)	Tanka Bahadur Gyalan	1,326
Others		738
Invalid Votes		1,257
Result	CPN (UML) gain	
Source: Election Commission

==== 1994 legislative elections ====
Party	Candidate	Votes
Rastriya Prajatantra Party	Kamal Thapa	16,753
CPN (Unified Marxist–Leninist)	Krishna Prasad Dahal	15,082
Independent	Omu Tempa Lama	5,511
Nepali Congress	Ganesh Lama	1,426
Others		654
Result	RPP gain	
Source: Election Commission

==== 1991 legislative elections ====
Party	Candidate	Votes
CPN (Unified Marxist–Leninist)	Krishna Prasad Dahal	14,184
Rastriya Prajatantra Party (Thapa)	Kamal Thapa	9,825
Result	CPN (UML) gain	

== See also ==
- List of parliamentary constituencies of Nepal
