= Bahadur Singh Lama =

Nepali politician

Honourable Bahadur Singh Lama
- बहादुर सिंह लामा
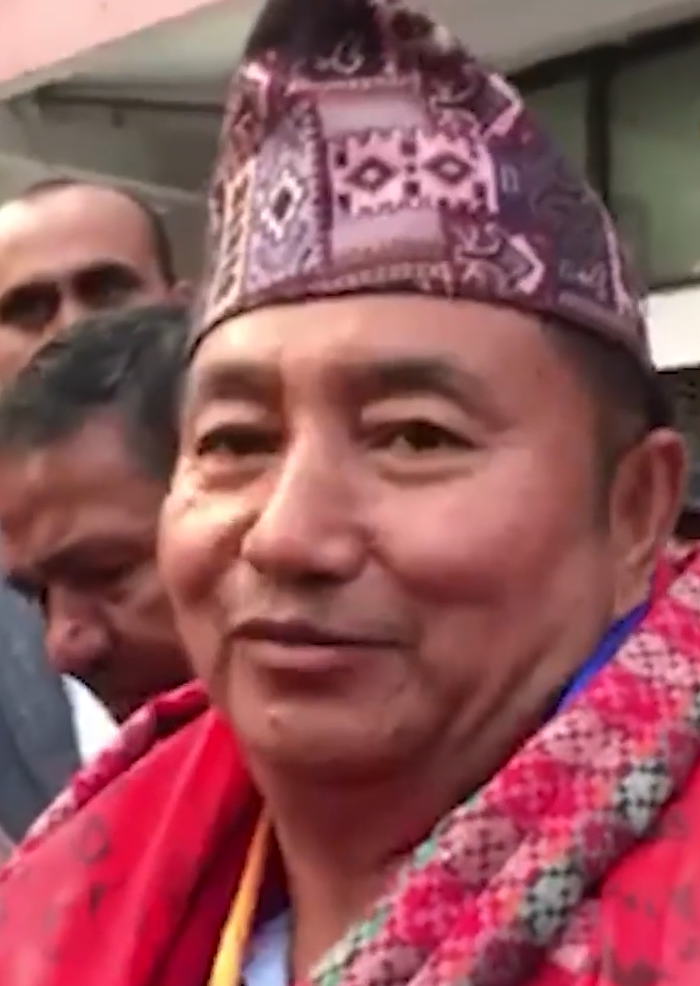

5th Chief Minister of Bagmati Province
- In office 24 July 2024 – 4 August 2025
- President: Ram Chandra Paudel
- Governor: Yadav Chandra Sharma
- Preceded by: Shalikram Jamkattel
- Succeeded by: Indra Bahadur Baniya

Minister for Economic Affairs and Planning of Bagmati Province
- In office 9 April 2023 – 6 March 2024
- Governor: Yadav Chandra Sharma
- Chief Minister: Shalikram Jamkattel
- Preceded by: Jagannath Thapaliya
- Succeeded by: Jagannath Thapaliya

Member of Bagmati Provincial Assembly
- Incumbent
- Assumed office 2022
- Constituency: Nuwakot 2(B)

Member of Parliament, Pratinidhi Sabha
- In office 4 March 2018 – 2022
- Constituency: Proportional list

Member of Constituent Assembly
- In office 21 January 2014 – 14 October 2017
- Preceded by: Post Bahadur Bogati
- Succeeded by: Constituency abolished
- Constituency: Nuwakot 3

Joint General Secretary of Nepali Congress
- Incumbent
- Assumed office 29 October 2026
- President: Gagan Thapa

Personal details
- Born: 24 October 1970 (age 56)
- Party: Nepali Congress
- Website: https://bahadursinghlama.com.np

Bahadur Singh Lama is a Nepali politician who served as the Chief minister of Bagmati Province. Lama is elected member of the Bagmati Provincial Assembly from Nuwakot 2 (B). He has previously served as minister for economic affairs of the province.

Lama who had served as the member of the House of Representatives of the federal parliament of Nepal, was elected through the proportional representation system from Nepali Congress and served as member of the House of Representatives. In the 2013 Nepalese Constituent Assembly election, Lama was elected from Nuwakot 3 defeating senior Maoist leader Post Bahadur Bogati.

In 15th general convention of the Nepali Congress party he was elected as the Joint General Secretary and has been serving in the post since 29 October 2026.

== See also ==
- Bahadur Singh Lama cabinet
