= 1st Bagmati Provincial Assembly =

2017 legislative term in Nepal

2nd Assembly	→

Overview
- Legislative body: Bagmati Provincial Assembly
- Jurisdiction: Bagmati Province, Nepal
- Meeting place: Regional Educational Directorate, Hetauda, Makwanpur District
- Term: 1 February 2018 – September 2022
- Election: 2017 provincial elections
- Government: Dormani Poudel cabinet Astalaxmi Shakya cabinet Rajendra Prasad Pandey cabinet
- Website: pradeshsabha.p3.gov.np

Provincial Assembly
- Members: 110
- Speaker: Sanu Kumar Shrestha (UML)
- Deputy Speaker: Radhika Tamang (Maoist)
- Chief Minister: Dormani Poudel (UML); Astalaxmi Shakya (UML); Rajendra Prasad Pandey (US)
- Leader of the Opposition: Indra Bahadur Baniya (NC); Astalaxmi Shakya (UML)

The first Bagmati Provincial Assembly was elected by the 2017 provincial elections in Nepal. 110 members were elected to the assembly, 66 of whom were elected through direct elections and 44 of whom were elected through the party list proportional representation system. The term of the assembly started on 1 February 2018 and ended in September 2022. Dormani Poudel and Astalaxmi Shakya served as the chief ministers from the CPN (UML) and Rajendra Prasad Pandey served as chief minister from CPN (Unified Socialist) during the term of the assembly. Sanu Kumar Shrestha served as the speaker of the assembly and Radhika Tamang served as the deputy speaker.

== Composition ==
Party	Seats	
Party	After election	At dissolution
CPN (UML)	58	42
CPN (Maoist Centre)	23	23
Nepali Congress	21	22
CPN (Unified Socialist)	—	13
Bibeksheel Sajha Party	3	3
Rastriya Prajatantra Party	1	2
Nepal Majdoor Kisan Party	2	2
Independent	1	1
Rastriya Prajatantra Party (Democratic)	1	—
Vacant	—	3
Total		110

== Leaders ==
=== Office bearers ===
- Speaker of the Provincial Assembly: Hon. Sanu Kumar Shrestha
  - Deputy Speaker of the Provincial Assembly: Radhika Tamang
- Chief Minister of Bagmati Province
  - Hon. Dormani Paudel (CPN (UML)) (until 18 August 2021)
  - Hon. Ashta Laxmi Shakya (CPN (UML)) (18 August 2021 – 27 October 2021)
  - Hon. Rajendra Prasad Pandey (Communist Party of Nepal (Unified Socialist)) (from 27 October 2021)
- Leader of Opposition
  - Indra Bahadur Baniya (Nepali Congress) (until 27 October 2021)
  - Ashta Laxmi Shakya (CPN (UML)) (until 27 October 2021)

=== Parliamentary party leaders ===
- Parliamentary party leader of CPN (UML):
  - Dormani Paudel (until 18 August 2021)
  - Ashta Laxmi Shakya (since 18 August 2021)
- Parliamentary party leader of CPN (Maoist Centre): Shalikram Jamkattel
  - Deputy parliamentary party leader of CPN (Maoist Centre): Kumari Moktan
- Parliamentary party leader of Nepali Congress: Indra Bahadur Baniya
  - Deputy parliamentary party leader of Nepali Congress: Krishna Lal Bhadel
- Parliamentary party leader of Communist Party of Nepal (Unified Socialist): Rajendra Prasad Pandey
  - Deputy parliamentary party leader of Communist Party of Nepal (Unified Socialist): Krishna Prasad Sharma
- Parliamentary party leader of Bibeksheel Sajha Party: Ramesh Paudyal
- Parliamentary party leader of Nepal Majdoor Kisan Party: Surendra Raj Gosai

=== Whips ===
- Chief Whip of CPN (UML): Deepak Niraula
- Chief Whip of CPN (Maoist Centre): Buddhiman Majhi
  - Whip (CPN (Maoist Centre)): Pratima Shrestha
- Chief Whip of Nepali Congress: Radha Ghale
  - Whip (Nepali Congress): Chhiring Dorje Lama
- Chief Whip of Communist Party of Nepal (Unified Socialist): Munu Sigdel
  - Whip (Communist Party of Nepal (Unified Socialist)): Basundhara Humagain

== Members ==
Constituency (PR if blank)	Member	Party
	Aangdendi Lama	CPN (Maoist Centre)
Kathmandu 9(A)	Ajay Kranti Shakya	CPN (UML)
Sindhupalchok 1(A)	Arun Prasad Nepal	CPN (UML)
	Ashamaya Tamang	CPN (UML)
Kathmandu 8(B)	Astha Laxmi Shakya	CPN (UML)
Nuwakot 1(B)	Badri Mainali	CPN (UML)
	Balram Poudel	Nepali Congress
Kathmandu 7(A)	Basanta Prasad Manandhar	CPN (Unified Socialist)
Kavrepalanchok 2(B)	Basundhara Humagain	CPN (Unified Socialist)
	Belimaiya Ghale	CPN (UML)
	Bhawana Subedi	CPN (Maoist Centre)
	Bhimsen Khatri	Nepali Congress
	Bijaya Shrestha (KC)	Nepali Congress
	Bijula Kumari Barma	Nepali Congress
Sindhuli 2(A)	Binod Kumar Khadka	CPN (UML)
	Biraj Bhakta Shrestha	Bibeksheel Sajha Party
Dolakha 1(A)	Bishal Khadka	CPN (Maoist Centre)
Sindhuli 2(B)	Buddhi Man Majhi	CPN (Maoist Centre)
Kavrepalanchok 1(B)	Chandra Bahadur Lama	CPN (UML)
Lalitpur 1(B)	Chetnath Sanjel	CPN (UML)
Kathmandu 3(A)	Chhiring Dorje Lama	Nepali Congress
Chitwan 1(A)	Dawa Dorje Lama	CPN (UML)
	Debaki Shrestha	CPN (UML)
	Dinesh Maharjan	CPN (Maoist Centre)
Kathmandu 5(B)	Deepak Niraula	CPN (UML)
Kathmandu 1(A)	Dipendra Shrestha	Nepali Congress
Makwanpur 1(B)	Dormani Poudel	CPN (UML)
Kathmandu 1(B)	Ganesh Prasad Dulal	CPN (UML)
Chitwan 2(A)	Ghanashyam Dahal	CPN (Maoist Centre)
	Gita Wagle	Nepali Congress
	Goma Bhurtel	CPN (UML)
Lalitpur 2(B)	Gyanendra Shakya	CPN (UML)
	Himali Gole	CPN (Maoist Centre)
Nuwakot 2(B)	Hiranath Khatiwada	CPN (Maoist Centre)
Makwanpur 2(B)	Indra Bahadur Baniya	Nepali Congress
	Indramaya Gurung	CPN (Unified Socialist)
Dhading 2(B)	Jagat Bahadur Simkhada	CPN (Maoist Centre)
	Jeevan Dangol	Nepali Congress
Lalitpur 3(B)	Jivan Khadka	CPN (UML)
	Junelimaya Shrestha	CPN (UML)
Ramechhap 1(B)	Kailash Prasad Dhungel	CPN (UML)
	Kalpana Nepali	Nepali Congress
	Kanchan Khanal	CPN (Maoist Centre)
Kathmandu 9(B)	Keshav Prasad Pokharel	CPN (UML)
Nuwakot 2(A)	Keshav Raj Pandey	CPN (UML)
Bhaktapur 1(A)	Krishna Lal Bhandel	Nepali Congress
Chitwan 3(A)	Krishna Prasad Bhurtel	CPN (UML)
Chitwan 1(B)	Krishna Prasad Sharma Khanal	CPN (Unified Socialist)
Makwanpur 2(A)	Kumari Moktan	CPN (Maoist Centre)
Kathmandu 4(B)	Kusum Kumar Karki	CPN (Unified Socialist)
Lalitpur 1(A)	Lal Kumari Pun	CPN (Maoist Centre)
Kavrepalanchok 2(A)	Laxman Lamsal	CPN (Unified Socialist)
Sindhuli 1(A)	Lekhnath Dahal	CPN (Maoist Centre)
Lalitpur 2(A)	Madhav Prasad Paudel	CPN (Unified Socialist)
	Maina Achhami	CPN (UML)
Kathmandu 2(B)	Mani Ram Phuyal	CPN (UML)
	Milanbabu Shrestha	Nepali Congress
	Mina Gyawali (Nepal)	CPN (Unified Socialist)
	Munu Sigdel	CPN (Unified Socialist)
Kathmandu 5(A)	Narayan Bahadur Silwal	CPN (UML)
Kathmandu 4(A)	Narottam Vaidya	Nepali Congress
	Nhuchhe Narayan Shrestha	Nepali Congress
Sindhupalchok 2(B)	Nima Lama	Nepali Congress
	Om Bahadur Glan	CPN (Maoist Centre)
	Parbati Silwal	CPN (Unified Socialist)
Rasuwa 1(A)	Prabhat Tamang	Nepali Congress
Sindhuli 1(B)	Pradip Kumar Katuwal Chhetri (K.C)	CPN (UML)
Kathmandu 7(B)	Prakash Shrestha	CPN (UML)
	Pratima Shrestha	CPN (Maoist Centre)
Makwanpur 1(A)	Prem Bahadur Pulami	CPN (Maoist Centre)
Rasuwa 1(B)	Prem Bahadur Tamang	Independent
Kathmandu 10(A)	Pukar Maharjan	Nepali Congress
	Rachana Khadka	CPN (UML)
	Radha Ghale	Nepali Congress
Nuwakot 1(A)	Radhika Tamang	CPN (Maoist Centre)
	Rajaram Karki Chhetri	Nepali Congress
Lalitpur 3(A)	Raj Kaji Maharjan	CPN (Maoist Centre)
	Rajani Amatya	Nepali Congress
	Rajendra Gurung	Nepali Congress
Bhaktapur 2(B)	Rajendra Man Shrestha	CPN (Unified Socialist)
Dhading 1(A)	Rajendra Prasad Pandey	CPN (Unified Socialist)
Kathmandu 8(A)	Rajesh Shakya	CPN (UML)
Dhading 2(A)	Ram Kumar Adhikari	CPN (UML)
Chitwan 3(B)	Ram Lal Mahato	CPN (Maoist Centre)
Kathmandu 10(B)	Rama Ale Magar	CPN (Unified Socialist)
	Ramesh Poudyal	Bibeksheel Sajha Party
Kathmandu 3(B)	Rameshwor Phuyal	CPN (UML)
Kavrepalanchok 1(A)	Ratna Prasad Dhakal	CPN (Maoist Centre)
	Reena Gurung	Rastriya Prajatantra Party
	Rita Majhi	Rastriya Prajatantra Party
Dhading 1(B)	Salik Ram Jamkattel	CPN (Maoist Centre)
	Santa Bahadur Praja	Nepali Congress
Kathmandu 2(A)	Sanu Kumar Shrestha	CPN (UML)
	Saraswoti Basnet	CPN (UML)
	Saraswoti Bati	CPN (UML)
Sindhupalchok 1(B)	Saresh Nepal	CPN (UML)
Ramechhap 1(A)	Shanti Prasad Paudel	CPN (UML)
	Shanti Thing	CPN (UML)
Bhaktapur 2(A)	Shashi Jung Thapa	CPN (UML)
	Shova Shakya	Bibeksheel Sajha Party
	Sita Adhikari	CPN (Maoist Centre)
	Sita Lama	CPN (UML)
	Srijana Sayaju	Nepal Workers Peasants Party
Bhaktapur 1(B)	Surendra Raj Gosai	Nepal Workers Peasants Party
	Urmila Karmacharya	CPN (UML)
Kathmandu 6(B)	Yogendra Raj Shangraula	CPN (UML)
Sindhupalchok 2(A)	Yubaraj Dulal	CPN (Maoist Centre)

=== By-elections ===
Constituency (PR if blank)	Previous member	Party	Date seat vacated	Cause of vacation	New member	Party
Bhaktapur 1(A)	Harisharan Lamichhane	CPN (UML)	14 May 2018	Death	Krishna Lal Bhandel	Nepali Congress
Dolakha 1(B)	Pashupati Chaulagain	CPN (UML)	12 May 2021	Death		
Chitwan 2(B)	Bijay Subedi	CPN (UML)	21 April 2022	Resignation to contest as mayor of Bharatpur		
Kathmandu 6(A)	Keshav Sthapit	CPN (UML)	21 April 2022	Resignation to contest as mayor of Kathmandu		

== See also ==
- Bagmati Province
- 2017 Nepalese provincial elections
