= Rajendra Prasad Pandey cabinet =

Provincial government of Bagmati Province, Nepal

- 3rd Cabinet of Bagmati
- 2021–2023
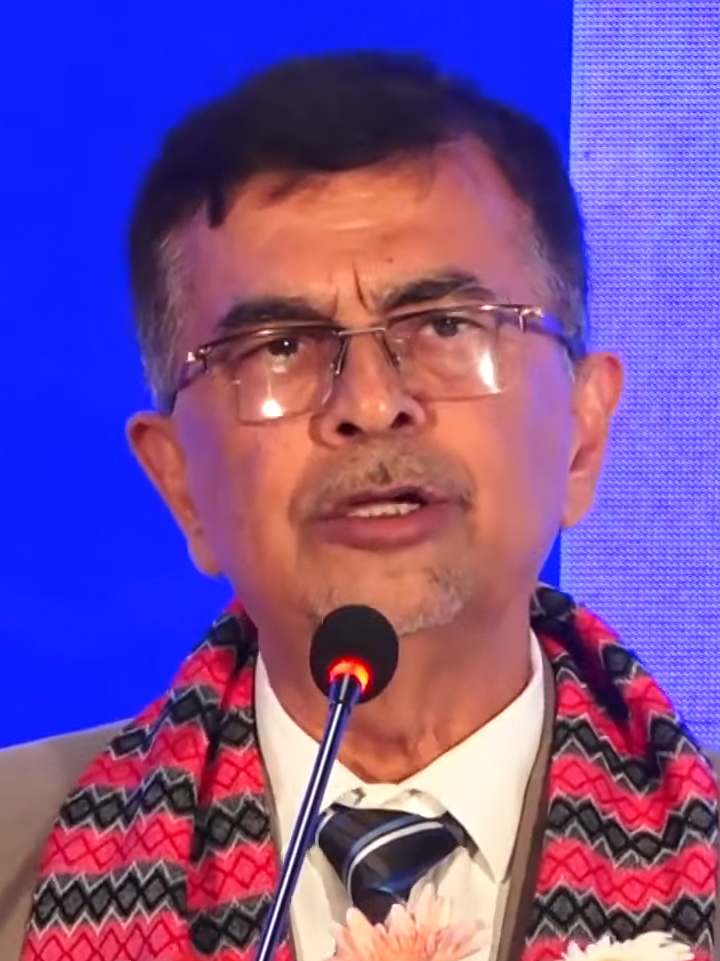
- Chief Minister Rajendra Prasad Pandey
- Date formed: 27 October 2021

People and organisations
- Governor: Yadav Chandra Sharma
- Chief Minister: Rajendra Prasad Pandey
- No. of ministers: 18
- Total no. of members: 18
- Member parties: CPN (Unified Socialist); Nepali Congress; CPN (Maoist Centre)
- Status in legislature: Majority (coalition) with external support from PSP-N 59 / 110
- Opposition party: CPN (UML)
- Opposition leader: Astalaxmi Shakya

History
- Election: 2017
- Legislature term: 1st Provincial Assembly
- Predecessor: Astalaxmi Shakya cabinet

The Rajendra Prasad Pandey cabinet is the incumbent provincial government of Bagmati Province. It was formed after Rajendra Prasad Pandey was sworn in as Chief Minister on 27 October 2021. The cabinet was expanded to six members 11 November 2021, to 12 members on 14 December 2021 and 18 members on 25 December 2021.

== Chief Minister & Cabinet Ministers ==
=== Current Arrangement ===
S.N.	Portfolio	Holder	Party	Took office
Cabinet ministers
1	Chief Minister	Rajendra Prasad Pandey	CPN (Unified Socialist)	27 October 2021
2	Minister for Economic Affairs and Planning	Shalikram Jamkattel	CPN (Maoist Centre)	11 November 2021
3	Minister for Physical Infrastructure Development	Krishna Lal Bhadel	Nepali Congress	27 October 2021
4	Minister for Internal Affairs and Law	Krishna Prasad Sharma Khanal	CPN (Unified Socialist)	27 October 2021
5	Minister for Social Development	Kumari Muktan	CPN (Maoist Centre)	27 October 2021
6	Minister for Health	Nima Lama	Nepali Congress	11 November 2021
7	Minister for Labour, Employment and Transportation	Ghanashyam Dahal	CPN (Maoist Centre)	14 December 2021
8	Minister for Water Supply, Energy and Irrigation	Basanta Prasad Manandhar	CPN (Unified Socialist)	14 December 2021
9	Minister for Agriculture and Livestock Development	Basundhara Humagain	CPN (Unified Socialist)	14 December 2021
10	Minister for Forests and Environment	Bishal Khadka	CPN (Maoist Centre)	14 December 2021
11	Minister for Youth and Sports	Ratna Prasad Dhakal	CPN (Maoist Centre)	14 December 2021
12	Minister for Land Management, Co-operatives and Poverty Allivation	Balaram Paudel	Nepali Congress	25 December 2021
13	Minister for Industry, Commerce and Supply	Milan Babu Shrestha	Nepali Congress	25 December 2021
14	Minister for Culture and Tourism	Dipendra Shrestha	Nepali Congress	25 December 2021
State ministers
1	State minister for Agriculture and Livestock Development	Indramaya Gurung	CPN (Unified Socialist)	14 December 2021
2	State minister for Physical Infrastructure Development	Santa Bahadur Praja	Nepali Congress	25 December 2021
3	State minister for Industry, Commerce and Supply	Rajani Amatya Jonchhe	Nepali Congress	25 December 2021
4	State minister for Health	Kalpana Nepali	Nepali Congress	25 December 2021

== See also ==
- Provincial governments of Nepal
- 1st Bagmati Provincial Assembly
