= Sanu Kumar Shrestha =

Nepali politician

- सानु कुमार श्रेष्ठ
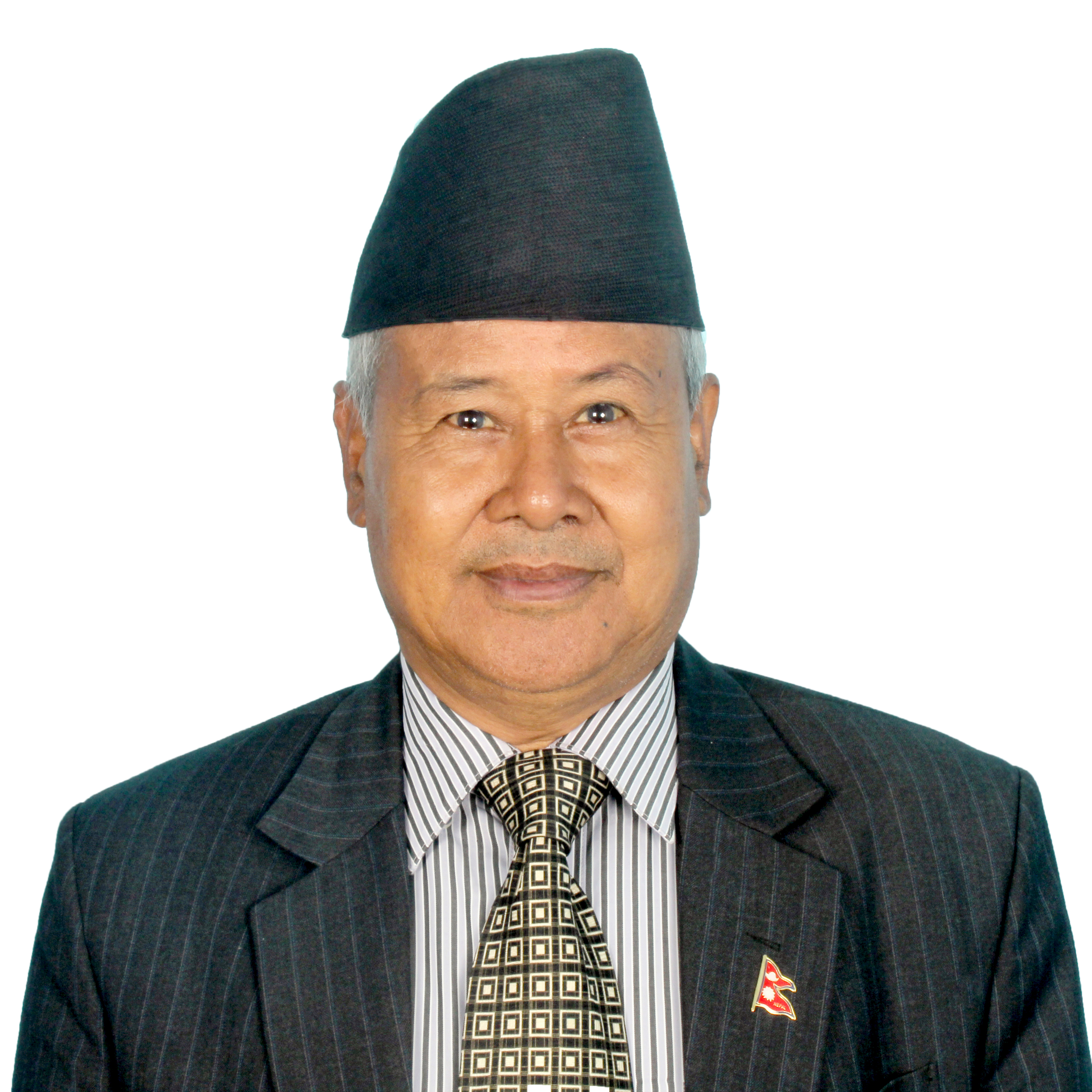

Speaker of the Bagmati Provincial Assembly
- In office 10 February 2018 – 12 October 2022
- Governor: Anuradha Koirala; Bishnu Prasad Prasain; Yadav Chandra Sharma
- Deputy: Radhika Tamang
- Chief Minister: Dormani Poudel; Astalaxmi Shakya; Rajendra Prasad Pandey
- Preceded by: Constituency created
- Succeeded by: Bhuwan Kumar Pathak

Member of Bagmati Provincial Assembly
- In office 1 February 2018 – 18 September 2022
- Preceded by: Constituency created
- Succeeded by: Sunil KC
- Constituency: Kathmandu 2 (A)

Personal details
- Party: CPN (Unified Marxist-Leninist)
- Other political affiliations: Nepal Communist Party

Sanu Kumar Shrestha is a Nepali politician who served as Speaker of 1st Bagmati Provincial Assembly from 10 February 2018 to 12 October 2022. He was elected unopposed to the post of Speaker, as no other candidate had filed candidacy for the post. He was elected to the Bagmati Provincial Assembly from the Kathmandu 2 constituency as a candidate of the CPN (UML) in the 2017 Nepalese general election. He was elected with 8,936 votes, defeating his closest competitor, Lokesh Dhakal of the Nepali Congress, who received 5,758 votes.
