= Yubaraj Dulal =

Nepalese politician

- युवराज दुलाल

Member of Parliament, Pratinidhi Sabha
- Incumbent
- Assumed office 26 March 2026
- Preceded by: Mohan Bahadur Basnet
- Constituency: Sindhupalchok 2

Minister for Physical Infrastructure and Development of Bagmati Province
- In office 10 January 2023 – 23 July 2024
- Governor: Yadav Chandra Sharma
- Chief Minister: Shalikram Jamkattel
- Preceded by: Krishna Lal Bhadel

Minister for Social Development of Bagmati Province
- In office 1 March 2018 – 25 December 2020
- Governor: Anuradha Koirala; Bishnu Prasad Prasain
- Chief Minister: Dormani Poudel
- Preceded by: Constituency created
- Succeeded by: Saraswati Basnet

Member of the Bagmati Provincial Assembly
- In office 1 February 2018 – 19 January 2026
- Preceded by: Constituency created
- Constituency: Sindhupalchok 2 (A)

Personal details
- Born: 19 February 1983 (age 43) Sanusiruwari, Sindhupalchok District, Nepal
- Party: Nepali Communist Party
- Other political affiliations: CPN (Maoist Centre)
- Spouse: Parbati Dulal
- Parents: Guru Prasad Dulal (father); Jhamkamaya dulal (mother)

Yubaraj Dulal is a Nepalese politician currently serving as a member of Parliament (MP) for Sindhupalchok 2 from the Nepali Communist Party. He previously served as a member of the Bagmati Provincial Assembly from Sindhupalchok 2 (A) from 2018 to 2025.

== Civil War ==
He became active with the CPN (Maoist) in 1994.

== Political career ==
He joined the All Nepal National Independent Students' Union (Revolutionary) in 1993.

Dulal was elected to the Bagmati Provincial Assembly from Sindhupalchok 2 (A) at the 2017 provincial elections. He served as a minister in the Poudel cabinet from February 2018 to December 2020.

He was re-elected to the Bagmati Provincial Assembly in the 2022 provincial election. He served as a minister in the Jamkattel cabinet from January 2023 to July 2024.

Dulal resigned from the Bagmati provincial assembly in January 2026 to contest the 2026 general election. He was elected to the Pratinidhi Sabha from Sindhupalchok 2.

== Personal life ==
He is married to Parbati Dulal with whom he was two children.
