= Radhika Tamang =

Nepalese politician

- राधिका तामाङ

Deputy Speaker of the Bagmati Provincial Assembly
- In office 11 February 2018 – 18 September 2022
- Governor: Anuradha Koirala, Bishnu Prasad Prasain, Yadav Chandra Sharma
- Speaker: Sanu Kumar Shrestha
- Chief minister: Dormani Poudel; Astalaxmi Shakya; Rajendra Prasad Pandey
- Preceded by: Constituency created
- Succeeded by: Apsara Chapagain Khatri

Member of Bagmati Provincial Assembly
- Incumbent
- Assumed office 2018
- Preceded by: Position created
- Constituency: Proportional representation

Personal details
- Party: Communist Party of Nepal (Maoist)

Radhika Tamang is a Nepalese politician and deputy speaker of Provincial Assembly of Bagmati Province. She was elected from Nuwakot 1 (constituency) in May 2018.
