= Dormani Poudel cabinet =

- 1st Cabinet of Bagmati Province
- Date formed: 12 February 2018
- Date dissolved: 18 August 2021

People and organisations
- Head of state: Anuradha Koirala; Bishnu Prasad Prasain (as Governor of Bagmati Province)
- Head of government: Dormani Poudel
- No. of ministers: 7
- Ministers removed: 1
- Member parties: Nepal Communist Party
- Status in legislature: Majority
- Opposition party: Nepali Congress
- Opposition leader: Indra Bahadur Baniya

History
- Election: 2017
- Legislature term: 5 years
- Predecessor: Province established
- Successor: Astalaxmi Shakya Cabinet

Dormani Poudel was sworn in as Chief Minister of Bagmati Province on 12 February 2018. Here is the list of ministers.

== Chief Minister & Cabinet Ministers ==
Current

S.N.	Portfolio	Holder	Party	Took office
1	Chief Minister	Dormani Poudel	CPN(UML)	12 February 2018
2	Minister for Internal Affairs and Law	Keshav Raj Pandey	CPN(UML)	28 April 2021
3	Minister for Economic Affairs and Planning	Kailash Dhungel	CPN(UML)	1 March 2018
4	Minister for Physical Infrastructure and Development	Rameshwor Phuyal	CPN(UML)	17 February 2019
5	Minister for Social Development	Saraswati Basnet	CPN(UML)	28 April 2021
6	Minister for Industry, Tourism, Forest and Environment	Saresh Nepal	CPN(UML)	28 April 2021
7	Minister for Land Management, Agriculture and Co-operatives	Dawa Dorje Lama	CPN(UML)	1 March 2018

Till March 2021

Sl No.	Name	Constituency (PR if blank)	Portfolio	Took office	Left office
1	Dormani Poudel, Chief Minister	Makwanpur 1(B)		12 February 2018	
2	Shalikram Jamarkattel	Dhading 1(B)	Ministry of Internal Affairs and Law	12 February 2018	25 December 2020
3	Kailash Dhungel	Ramechhap 1(B)	Ministry for Economic Affairs and Planning	1 March 2018	
4	Yubaraj Dulal	Sindhupalchok 2(A)	Ministry of Social Development	1 March 2018	25 December 2020
5	Arun Prasad Nepal	Sindhupalchok 1(A)	Ministry for Industry, Tourism, Forest and Environment	1 March 2018	25 December 2020
6	Dawa Dorje Lama	Chitwan 1(A)	Ministry for Land Management, Agriculture and Co-operatives	1 March 2018	
7	Keshav Sthapit	Kathmandu 6(A)	Ministry for Physical Infrastructure Development	12 February 2018	2 November 2018
8	Rameshwor Phuyal	Kathmandu 3(B)	Ministry for Physical Infrastructure Development	17 February 2019	

== See also ==
- Sher Dhan Rai cabinet
- Lalbabu Raut cabinet
- Krishna Chandra Nepali cabinet
- Kul Prasad KC cabinet
- Mahendra Bahadur Shahi cabinet
- Trilochan Bhatta cabinet
