= Kathmandu 7 =

Parliamentary constituency in Nepal

- Parliamentary constituency for the House of Representatives
- Kathmandu 7 in Bagmati Province

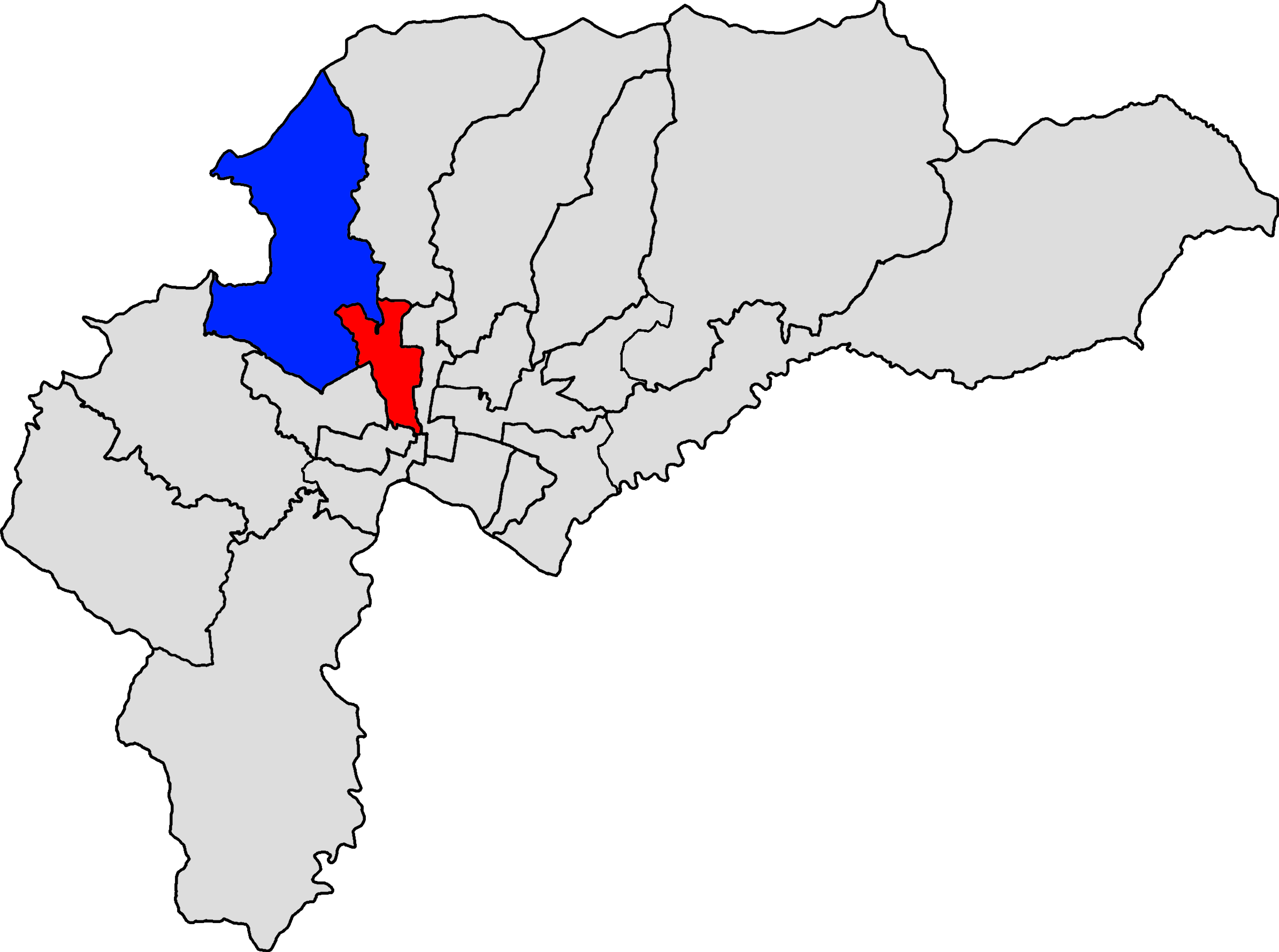
- Assembly segment Kathmandu 7(A) (red) and Kathmandu 7(B) (blue) within Kathmandu District
- District: Kathmandu
- Province: Bagmati Province
- Electorate: 68,685
- Major settlements: Kathmandu, Nagarjun, Tarakeshwar

Current constituency
- Created: 1994
- Party: Rastriya Swatantra Party
- Member of Parliament: Ganesh Parajuli
- Local Levels: Kathmandu Metropolitan City; Nagarjun Municipality; Tarakeshwar Municipality

Kathmandu 7 is one of 10 parliamentary constituencies of Kathmandu District for the House of Representatives. The constituency in the current form was created during the first constituent assembly election in 2008 and has remained unchanged since then. It consists of wards 16, 17, 18 and 25 of Kathmandu Metropolitan City, wards 1, 2 and 3 of Nagarjun Municipality and wards 3, 4 and 5 of Tarakeshwar Municipality. The current parliamentarian from this constituency is Ganesh Parajuli of Rastriya Swatantra Party.

== Assembly segments ==
It encompasses the following Bagmati Province Provincial Assembly segments.

- Kathmandu 7(A)
- Kathmandu 7(B)

== Members of Parliament ==
=== Parliament/Constituent Assembly ===
Election	Member	Party
1994	Krishna Gopal Shrestha	CPN (Unified Marxist–Leninist)
1999	Tirtha Ram Dangol	Nepali Congress
2008	Hisila Yami	CPN (Maoist)
January 2009	Hisila Yami	UCPN (Maoist)
2013	Ram Bir Manandhar	CPN (Unified Marxist–Leninist)
May 2018	Ram Bir Manandhar	Nepal Communist Party
March 2021	Ram Bir Manandhar	CPN (Unified Marxist–Leninist)
2022	Ganesh Parajuli	Rastriya Swatantra Party
2026	Ganesh Parajuli	Rastriya Swatantra Party

=== Provincial Assembly ===
==== 7(A) ====
Election	Member	Party
2017	Basanta Prasad Manadhar	CPN (Unified Marxist–Leninist)
May 2018	Basanta Prasad Manadhar	Nepal Communist Party
March 2021	Basanta Prasad Manadhar	CPN (Unified Marxist–Leninist)
August 2021	Basanta Prasad Manadhar	CPN (Unified Socialist)

==== 7(B) ====
Election	Seat	Member	Party
2017	7(B)	Prakash Shrestha	CPN (Unified Marxist–Leninist)
May 2018	7(B)	Prakash Shrestha	Nepal Communist Party

== Election results ==
=== Election in the 2020s ===
==== 2026 general election ====
Candidate	Party	Votes	%
Ganesh Parajuli	Rastriya Swatantra Party	27,805	65.18
Pramod Hari Guragain	Nepali Congress	3,982	9.33
Basanta Prasad Manandhar	Nepali Communist Party	3,667	8.60
Prakash Shrestha	CPN (UML)	3,544	8.31
Bimala Lama	Ujyaalo Nepal Party	1,383	3.24
Lal Kumar Lama	Rastriya Prajatantra Party	1,381	3.24
Maniram Bahadur Pradhan	Shram Sanskriti Party	446	1.05
Ganesh Maya Dangol	Nepal Workers Peasants Party	97	0.23
Dipak Manandhar	Nepal Communist Party (Maoist)	78	0.18
Others		275	0.64
Total		42,658	100.00
Valid votes		42,658	98.15
Invalid/blank votes		805	1.85
Total votes		43,463	100.00
Registered voters/turnout		68,685	63.28
Majority		23,823	
Rastriya Swatantra Party hold			

==== 2022 general election ====
Candidate	Party	Votes	%
Ganesh Parajuli	Rastriya Swatantra Party	8,743	24.25
Shyam Kumar Ghimire	CPN (UML)	6,800	18.86
Manushi Yami Bhattarai	CPN (Maoist Centre)	6,063	16.81
Dhruba Bikram Malla	Rastriya Prajatantra Party	2,863	7.94
Yadhav Lal Kayastha	Independent	2,782	7.71
Rajendra Prasad Shrestha	People's Socialist Party, Nepal	2,461	6.82
Kiran K.C.	Independent	1,570	4.35
Prabendra Pokharel	Hamro Nepali Party	1,510	4.19
Ram Bir Manandhar	Independent	1,215	3.37
Others		2,054	5.70
Total		36,061	100.00
Majority		1,943	
Rastriya Swatantra Party gain			

=== Election in the 2010s ===
==== 2017 Legislative Election ====
Party	Candidate	Votes	%
CPN (Unified Marxist–Leninist)	Ram Bir Manandhar	18,102	48.38
Rastriya Prajatantra Party	Bikram Bahadur Thapa	10,079	26.94
Bibeksheel Sajha Party	Anupa Shrestha	5,376	14.37
Federal Socialist Forum, Nepal	Gyanendra Mohan Shrestha	1,781	4.76
Others		2,077	5.55
Invalid votes		1,261	3.26
Turnout		38,676	67.19
Result	CPN (UML) hold		
Source: Election Commission

==== 2017 provincial elections ====
===== Kathmandu 7(A) =====
Party	Candidate	Votes	%
CPN (Unified Marxist–Leninist)	Basanta Prasad Manandhar	8,800	37.86
Nepali Congress	Bijaya Bahadur Mali	8,766	37.72
Bibeksheel Sajha Party	Bikash Ranjit	3,383	14.56
Others		2,292	9.86
Invalid votes		546	
Result	CPN (UML) gain		
Source: Election Commission

===== Kathmandu 7(B) =====
Party	Candidate	Votes	%
CPN (Unified Marxist–Leninist)	Prakash Shrestha	6,022	41.53
Nepali Congress	Dharma Raj Aryal	5,302	36.56
Independent	Bidur Dhamala	1,351	9.32
Bibeksheel Sajha Party	Prem Lama	1,116	7.70
Others		711	4.90
Invalid votes		418	
Result	CPN (UML) gain		
Source: Election Commission

==== 2013 Constituent Assembly Election ====
Party	Candidate	Votes
CPN (Unified Marxist–Leninist)	Ram Bir Manandhar	13,289
Nepali Congress	Pramila Devi Singh Dangol	10,486
UCPN (Maoist)	Hisila Yami	7,015
Rastriya Prajatantra Party Nepal	Shailaja Pandey	4,180
Nepa Rastriya Party	Bijay Prakash Sainju	1,343
Federal Socialist Party, Nepal	Shesh Narayan Maharjan	1,159
Others		2,206
Result	CPN (UML) gain	
Source: NepalNews

=== Election in the 2000s ===
==== 2008 Constituent Assembly Election ====
Party	Candidate	Votes
CPN (Maoist)	Hisila Yami	12,276
CPN (Unified Marxist–Leninist)	Rajendra Prasad Shrestha	8,815
Nepali Congress	Pramila Devi Singh Dangol	7,707
Nepa Rastriya Party	Bijay Prakash Sainju	2,135
Rastriya Prajatantra Party Nepal	Raja Ram Shrestha	1,627
Others		3,140
Invalid votes		1,808
Result	CPN (Maoist) gain	

=== Election in the 1990s ===
==== 1999 legislative election ====
Party	Candidate	Votes
Nepali Congress	Tirtha Ram Dangol	18,587
CPN (Unified Marxist–Leninist)	Krishna Gopal Shrestha	15,304
CPN (Marxist–Leninist)	Ratna Bahadur Maharjan	6,957
Rastriya Prajatantra Party	Dhan Bahadur R.K.	1,235
Others		733
Invalid votes		943
Result	Congress gain	
Source: Election Commission

==== 1994 legislative elections ====
Party	Candidate	Votes
CPN (Unified Marxist–Leninist)	Krishna Gopal Shrestha	22,313
Nepali Congress	Dhyan Govind Ranjit	11,129
Rastriya Prajatantra Party	Shishir Prakash Dhital	3,673
Samyukta Jana Morcha Nepal	Lilamani Pokharel	2,565
Others		487
Result	CPN (UML) gain	
Source: Election Commission

== See also ==
- List of parliamentary constituencies of Nepal
