= Chief Minister of Bagmati Province =

Head of Bagmati Province government

- बागमती प्रदेशका मुख्यमन्त्री
- Incumbent; Kiran Thapa Magar since 20 August 2026
- Government of Bagmati Province
- Style: Honorable; Mr. Chief Minister
- Status: Head of Government
- Abbreviation: CMO
- Member of: Provincial Assembly; Cabinet
- Appointer: Governor
- Term length: Until majority confidence retained in provincial assembly Assembly term is 5 years unless dissolved earlier; No term limits
- Formation: 2018 (8 years ago)
- First holder: Dormani Poudel
- Salary: रु. - 61,000
- Website: Official website

The Chief Minister of the Bagmati Province is the head of government of Bagmati Province. The chief minister is appointed by the governor of the province according to Article 167 of the Constitution of Nepal. The chief minister remains in office for five years or until the provincial assembly is dissolved, and is subject to no term limits, given that they have the confidence of the assembly.

The current chief minister is Kiran Thapa Magar of the CPN (UML), in office since 20 August 2026.

== Qualification ==
The Constitution of Nepal sets the qualifications required to become eligible for the office of chief minister. A chief minister must meet the qualifications to become a member of the provincial assembly.

A member of the provincial assembly must be:

- a citizen of Nepal
- a voter of the concerned province
- of 25 years of age or more
- not convicted of any criminal offense
- not disqualified by any law
- not holding any office of profit

In addition to this, the chief minister must be the parliamentary party leader of the party with the majority seats in the provincial assembly. If no party has a majority, the chief minister must have a majority in the assembly with the support from other parties. If within thirty days of the election, a chief minister is not appointed as such, or fails to obtain a vote of confidence from the assembly, the parliamentary party leader of the party with the most seats in the assembly is appointed chief minister. If the chief minister such appointed fails to obtain a vote of confidence in the assembly, any assembly member who can command a majority in the floor, irrespective of party allegiance, is appointed chief minister. If this chief minister also fails to obtain a vote of confidence, the governor dissolves the assembly and fresh elections are called.

== List of chief ministers of Bagmati province ==
No.	Portrait	Name Constituency (Lifespan)	Term of office			Assembly (Mandate)	Party	Cabinet	Ref.
No.	Portrait	Name Constituency (Lifespan)	Assumed office	Left office	Time in office	Assembly (Mandate)	Party	Cabinet	Ref.
1		Dormani Poudel; MPA for Makwanpur 1 (B) (born 1946)	11 February 2018	18 August 2021	3 years, 188 days	1st (2017)	CPN (UML)	Poudel	
2		Astalaxmi Shakya; MPA for Kathmandu 8 (B) (born 1953)	18 August 2021	27 October 2021	70 days	1st (2017)	CPN (UML)	Shakya	
3		Rajendra Prasad Pandey; MPA for Dhading 1 (A) (born 1956)	27 October 2021	23 December 2022	1 year, 57 days	1st (2017)	CPN (Unified Socialist)	Pandey	
4		Shalikram Jamkattel; MPA for Dhading 1 (B) (born 1971)	10 January 2023	22 July 2024	1 year, 194 days	2nd (2022)	CPN (Maoist Centre)	Jamkattel	
5		Bahadur Singh Lama; MPA for Nuwakot 2 (B) (born 1970)	24 July 2024	4 August 2025	1 year, 11 days	2nd (2022)	Nepali Congress	Lama	
6		Indra Bahadur Baniya; MPA for Makwanpur 2 (B) (born 1970)	5 August 2025	17 August 2026	1 year, 12 days	2nd (2022)	Nepali Congress	Baniya	
7		Kiran Thapa Magar; MPA for Bhaktapur 2 (A) (born 1976)	20 August 2026	Incumbent	72 days	2nd (2022)	CPN (UML)	Thapa Magar	
