= Kathmandu 3 =

Parliamentary constituency in Nepal

- Parliamentary constituency for the House of Representatives
- Kathmandu 3 in Bagmati Province

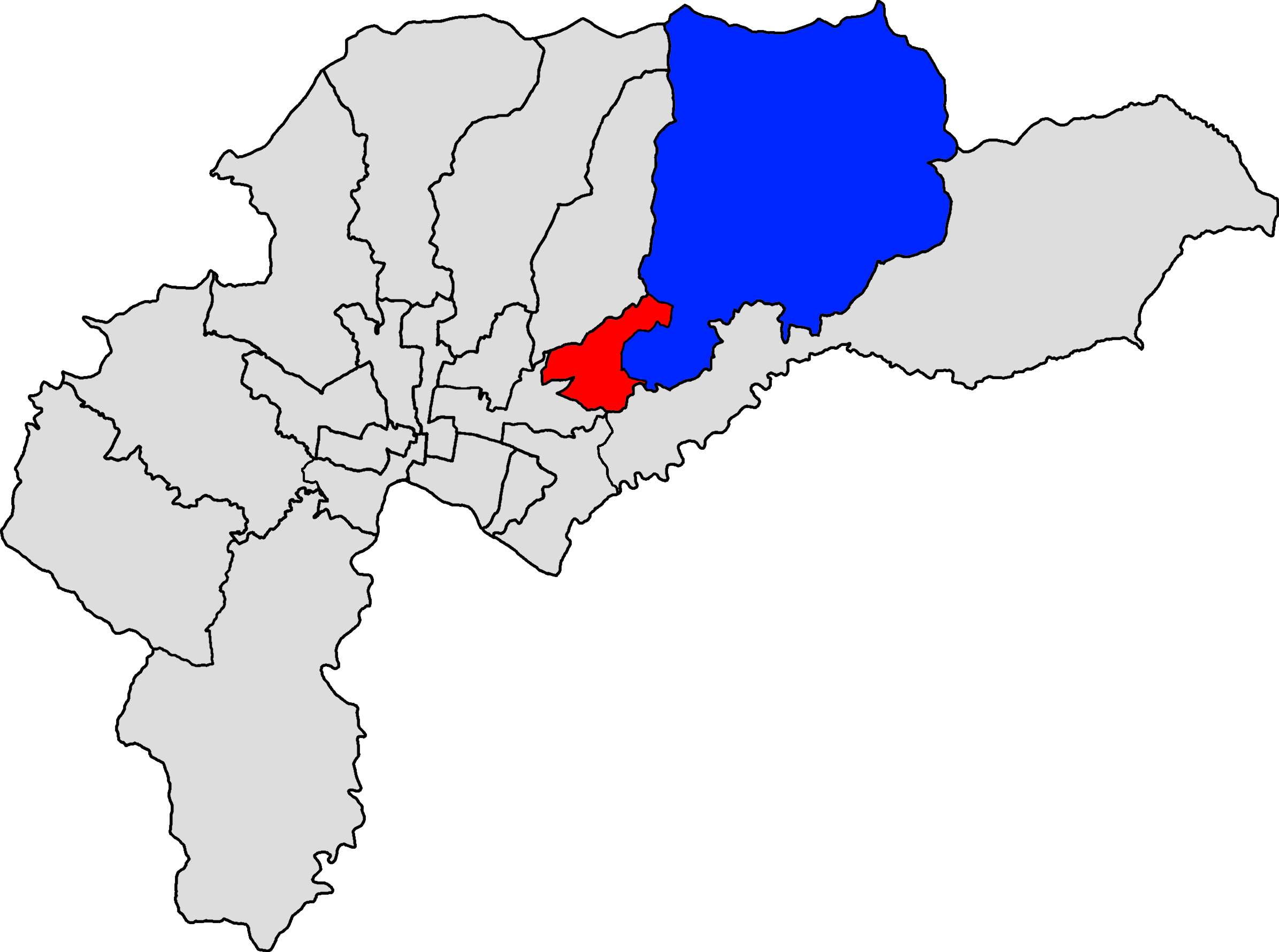
- Assembly segment Kathmandu 3(A) (red) and Kathmandu 3(B) (blue) within Kathmandu District
- Province: Bagmati Province
- District: Kathmandu District
- Electorate: 64,479
- Major settlements: Jorpati, Boudha, Gokarna, Sundarijal, Nayapati, Mulpani, Aarubari

Current constituency
- Created: 1991
- Party: Rastriya Swatantra Party
- Member of Parliament: Rajunath Pandey
- Local Levels: Gokarneshwar Municipality, Kageshwari-Manohara Municipality (wards 1–3), Kathmandu Metropolitan City (ward 6)

Kathmandu 3 is one of 10 parliamentary constituencies of Kathmandu District in Nepal. This constituency came into existence on the Constituency Delimitation Commission (CDC) report submitted on 31 August 2017.

== Incorporated areas ==
Kathmandu 3 parliamentary constituency consists of Gokarneshwar Municipality, wards 1, 2 and 3 of Kageshwari-Manohara Municipality and ward 6 of Kathmandu Metropolitan City.

== Assembly segments ==
It encompasses the following Bagmati Province Provincial Assembly segment

- Kathmandu 3(A)
- Kathmandu 3(B)

== Members of Parliament ==
=== Parliament/Constituent Assembly ===
Election	Member	Party
1991	Padma Ratna Tuladhar	CPN (Unified Marxist–Leninist)
1994	Man Mohan Adhikari	CPN (Unified Marxist–Leninist)
2008	Chakra Bahadur Thakuri	Nepali Congress
2013	Rameshwor Phuyal	CPN (Unified Marxist–Leninist)
2017	Krishna Bahadur Rai	CPN (Unified Marxist–Leninist)
May 2018	Krishna Bahadur Rai	Nepal Communist Party
March 2021	Krishna Bahadur Rai	CPN (Unified Marxist–Leninist)
2022	Santosh Chalise	Nepali Congress
2026	Rajunath Pandey	Rastriya Swatantra Party

=== Provincial Assembly ===
==== 3(A) ====
Election	Member	Party
2017	Tshiring Dorje Lama	Nepali Congress

==== 3(B) ====
Election	Member	Party
2017	Rameshwor Phuyal	CPN (Unified Marxist–Leninist)
May 2018	Rameshwor Phuyal	Nepal Communist Party

== Election results ==
=== Election in the 2020s ===
==== 2026 general election ====
Candidate	Party	Votes	%
Rajunath Pandey	Rastriya Swatantra Party	18,757	44.75
Kulman Ghising	Ujyaalo Nepal Party	11,171	26.65
Ramesh Aryal	Nepali Congress	6,000	14.31
Rameshwar Phuyal	CPN (UML)	3,816	9.10
Sundar Ram Bohara	Rastriya Prajatantra Party	841	2.01
Niraj Lama	Nepali Communist Party	518	1.24
Suwash Ghising	Shram Sanskriti Party	347	0.83
Keshav Nepal	Independent	265	0.63
Others		204	0.49
Total		41,919	100.00
Valid votes		41,919	97.81
Invalid/blank votes		940	2.19
Total votes		42,859	100.00
Registered voters/turnout		64,479	66.47
Majority		7,586	
Rastriya Swatantra Party gain			

==== 2022 general election ====
Candidate	Party	Votes	%
Santosh Chalise	Nepali Congress	15,158	40.62
Krishna Bahadur Rai	CPN (UML)	11,196	30.00
Durga Bikram Thapa Kshetri	Rastriya Swatantra Party	5,865	15.72
Ganesh Giri	Rastriya Prajatantra Party	2,511	6.73
Niranjan Pudasaini	Independent	605	1.62
Dwarika Adhikari	Hamro Nepali Party	547	1.47
Badri Prasad Bhajgai	Maoist Centre	518	1.39
Others		919	2.46
Total		37,319	100.00
Valid votes		37,319	95.55
Invalid/blank votes		1,737	4.45
Total votes		39,056	100.00
Registered voters/turnout		58,000	67.34
Majority		3,962	
Nepali Congress gain			

=== Election in the 2010s ===
==== 2017 legislative elections ====
Party	Candidate	Votes
CPN (Unified Marxist–Leninist)	Krishna Bahadur Rai	19,169
Nepali Congress	Ambika Basnet	14,884
Bibeksheel Sajha Party	Sumitra Singh Lama	2,205
Others		1,259
Invalid votes		1,486
Result	CPN (UML) hold	
Source: Election Commission

==== 2017 Nepalese provincial elections ====
===== Kathmandu 3(A) =====
Party	Candidate	Votes
Nepali Congress	Tshiring Dorje Lama	6,448
CPN (Maoist Centre)	Rudra Bahadur Baraili	5,335
Bibeksheel Sajha Party	Ramesh Kumar Pudasaini	1,961
Others		680
Invalid votes		346
Result	Congress gain	
Source: Election Commission

===== Kathmandu 3(B) =====
Party	Candidate	Votes
CPN (Unified Marxist–Leninist)	Rameshwor Phuyal	10,886
Nepali Congress	Bimal Thakuri	10,819
Bibeksheel Sajha Party	Mahesh Kumar Shrestha	1,078
Others		738
Invalid votes		728
Result	CPN (UML) gain	
Source: Election Commission

==== 2013 Constituent Assembly election ====
Party	Candidate	Votes
CPN (Unified Marxist–Leninist)	Rameshwor Phuyal	13,104
Nepali Congress	Chakra Bahadur Thakuri	12,246
UCPN (Maoist)	Ganesh Prasad Regmi	4,838
Rastriya Prajatantra Party Nepal	Meera Rana	1,839
Federal Socialist Party, Nepal	Aang Kaji Sherpa	1,799
Others		1,706
Result	CPN (UML) gain	
Source: Election Commission

=== Election in the 2000s ===
==== 2008 Constituent Assembly election ====
Party	Candidate	Votes
Nepali Congress	Chakra Bahadur Thakuri	12,966
CPN (Unified Marxist–Leninist)	Rameshwor Phuyal	9,549
CPN (Maoist)	Manu Humagain	7,371
Others		2,498
Invalid votes		1,457
Result	Congress gain	
Source: Election Commission

=== Election in the 1990s ===
==== 1999 legislative elections ====
Party	Candidate	Votes
CPN (Unified Marxist–Leninist)	Ishwar Pokhrel	15,965
Nepali Congress	Chiranjibi Nidhi Tiwari	14,552
CPN (Marxist–Leninist)	Krishna Sundar Malla	2,829
Others		2,347
Invalid Votes		815
Result	CPN (UML) hold	
Source: Election Commission

==== 1994 legislative elections ====
Party	Candidate	Votes
CPN (Unified Marxist–Leninist)	Man Mohan Adhikari	15,642
Nepali Congress	Prakash Man Singh	11,378
Rastriya Prajatantra Party	Jaya Kumar Khadka	4,453
Rastriya Jana Parishad	Kirti Nidhi Bista	1,180
Others		755
Result	CPN (UML) hold	
Source: Election Commission

==== 1991 legislative elections ====
Party	Candidate	Votes
CPN (Unified Marxist–Leninist)	Padma Ratna Tuladhar	26,480
Nepali Congress	Mangala Devi Singh	20,115
Result	CPN (UML) gain	

== See also ==
- List of parliamentary constituencies of Nepal
