= Speaker of the Sudurpashchim Provincial Assembly =

Presiding officer of the Sudurpashchim Provincial Assembly

Speaker of the Sudurpashchim Pradesh Sabha
- सुदूरपश्चिम प्रदेशको सभामुख
- Incumbent; Bhim Bahadur Bhandari since 17 January 2023
- Sudurpashchim Provincial Assembly
- Style: The Hon’ble
- Member of: Sudurpashchim Provincial Assembly
- Appointer: Members of the Sudurpashchim Provincial Assembly
- Term length: During the life of the Pradesh Sabha (five years maximum)
- Constituting instrument: Constitution of Nepal
- Inaugural holder: Arjun Bahadur Thapa
- Formation: 4 February 2018 (8 years ago)

The Speaker of the Sudurpashchim Provincial Assembly is the presiding officer (chair) of the Provincial Assembly of Sudurpashchim Province. The speaker is elected generally in the first meeting of the Sudurpashchim Provincial Assembly following provincial elections. Serving for a term of five years, the speaker is chosen from sitting members of the assembly.

The position of Speaker holds significant importance in the assembly process, presiding over the proceedings, maintaining order, and ensuring fair debate and discussion. The current speaker is Bhim Bahadur Bhandari since 17 January 2023.

== Qualification ==
The Constitution of Nepal sets the qualifications required to become eligible for the office of the Speaker and Deputy Speaker. A Speaker and Deputy Speaker must meet the qualifications to become a member of the provincial assembly. A member of the provincial assembly must be:

- One who is a citizen of Nepal;
- One who is a voter of the concerned Province;
- One who has completed the age of twenty-five years;
- One who is not convicted of a criminal offense involving moral turpitude;
- One who is not disqualified by any law; and
- One who is not holding any office of profit.

== List of Speakers ==
No.	Name Constituency	Term of office			Assembly (election)	Party	Ref
No.	Name Constituency	Took office	Left office	Term	Assembly (election)	Party	Ref
1	Arjun Bahadur Thapa; MPA for Bajhang 1 (A)	12 February 2018	18 September 2022	4 years, 218 days	1st (2018)	CPN (UML)	
2	Bhim Bahadur Bhandari; MPA for Bajhang 1 (B)	17 January 2023	Incumbent	3 years, 234 days	2nd (2022)	CPN (MC)	

== See also ==
- Speaker of the Koshi Provincial Assembly
- Speaker of the Bagmati Provincial Assembly
- Speaker of the Lumbini Provincial Assembly
- Speaker of the Karnali Provincial Assembly
