= Bhuwan Kumar Pathak =

Nepalese politician

Honourable Bhuwan Kumar Pathak
- भुवन कुमार पाठक
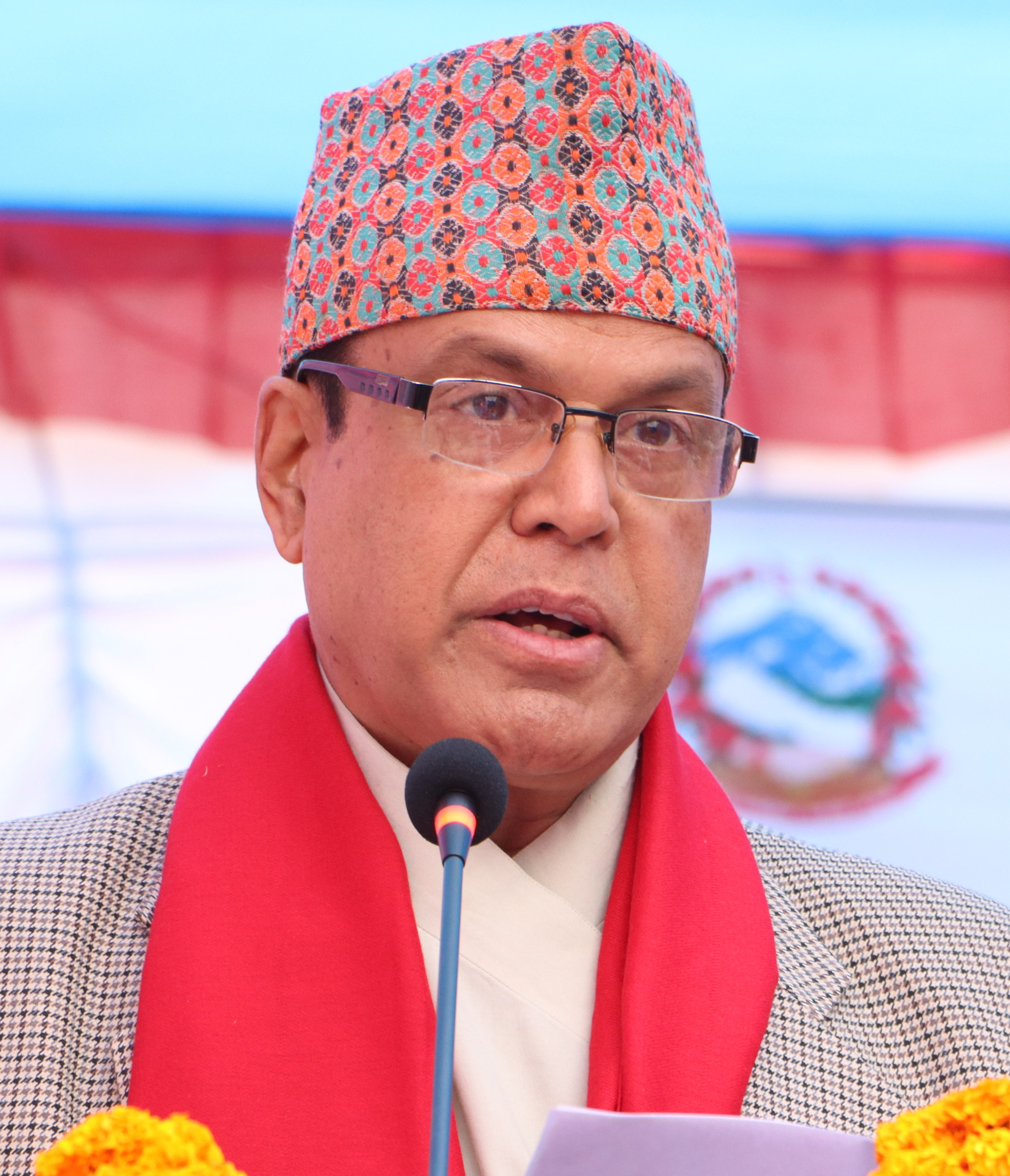
- Hon'ble Speaker Bhuwan Kumar Pathak

2nd Speaker of the Bagmati Provincial Assembly
- Incumbent
- Assumed office 13 January 2023
- Governor: Deepak Prasad Devkota
- Deputy: Apsara Chapagai Khatri
- Chief Minister: Indra Bahadur Baniya (5 August 2025 to till date); Bahadur Singh Lama (24 July 2024 – 4 August 2025); Shalikram Jamkattel (11 January 2023 – 23 July 2024)
- Preceded by: Sanu Kumar Shrestha

Member of the Bagmati Provincial Assembly
- Incumbent
- Assumed office 29 December 2022
- PR group: Khas Arya
- Constituency: Rastriya Prajatantra Party PR list

Personal details
- Born: 1958 (age 67–68) Bagmati Province, Nepal
- Party: Rastriya Prajatantra Party

Bhuwan Kumar Pathak (Nepali: भुवन कुमार पाठक) is a Nepalese politician and currently serving as the Speaker of the Bagmati Provincial Assembly since 13 January 2023. He is a member of the Bagmati Provincial Assembly from Rastriya Prajatantra Party. In the 2022 Nepalese provincial election he was elected as a proportional representative from the Khas people category.

== See also ==
- Provincial Assembly Profile
