= Krishna Bahadur Rai =

Krishna Bahadur Rai may refer to:

- Krishna Bahadur Rai (Nepali politician) (born 1969)
- Krishna Bahadur Rai (Indian politician) (died 2026)
