= Basanta Prasad Manandhar =

Nepali politician

- बसन्त प्रसाद मानन्धर

Minister for Water supply, Energy and Irrigation of Bagmati Province
- In office 14 December 2021 – 23 December 2022
- Governor: Yadav Chandra Sharma
- Chief Minister: Rajendra Prasad Pandey
- Preceded by: Constituency created
- Succeeded by: Uddhav Thapa

Member of the Bagmati Provincial Assembly
- Incumbent
- Assumed office 1 February 2018
- Preceded by: Constituency created
- Constituency: Kathmandu 7 (A)

Personal details
- Party: Communist Party of Nepal (Unified Socialist)

Basanta Prasad Manandhar (Nepali: बसन्त प्रसाद मानन्धर) is a Nepalese politician who serves as a member of the Bagmati Provincial Assembly. He had previously served as Minister for Water, Energy and Irrigation of Bagmati Province.

== See also ==
- CPN (Unified Socialist)
