= Rangu Souriya =

Indian activist

- Born: Panighatta Tea Estate, Mirik (community development block), Darjeeling District, West Bengal, India
- Education: Darjeeling Government College
- Occupation: Social activist
- Parent(s): Aity and B. R. Souriya
- Awards: Godfrey Phillips National Bravery Awards

Rangu Souriya is an Indian activist and social worker for women and children. She is the founder of Kanchanjunga Uddhar Kendra, a non-profit organization based in Siliguri, dedicated to helping victims of sex trafficking in Darjeeling, North East India and Nepal. She was awarded the Godfrey Phillips National Bravery Awards in 2011.

== Work ==
In 2004, Souriya went to Kathmandu to seek guidance from Anuradha Koirala and team Maiti Nepal. After interacting and learning from them, she came back to Darjeeling and started Kanchanjunga Uddhar Kendra. Since then she and others at the NGO have rescued more than 1100 girls from cities like Patna, Delhi, Mumbai, and Kolkata.

== Recognition ==
Souriya received the Godfrey Phillips National Bravery Award in 2011 and was recognised with the Federation of Indian Chambers of Commerce and Industry's Women Achievers' Award in 2009. In addition, she has been honoured by more than 20 regional organisations for her services.

In January 2016, she was listed as part of the 100 Women Initiative of the Ministry of Women and Child Development (India) that aims to recognise and acknowledge 100 women who are making a difference in their communities across the country,

== See also ==
- Social worker
- Anuradha Koirala
