= Piskar =

Piskar पिस्कर
- Village development committee
- Location in Nepal
- Coordinates: 27.74°N 85.94°E
- Country: Nepal
- Zone: Bagmati Zone
- District: Sindhupalchok District
- Gaunpalika: Tripurasundari

Population (2021)
  - Total: 2,308
  - Religions: Hindu
- Time zone: UTC+5:45 (Nepal Time)

Piskar is a village in Sindhupalchok District in the Bagmati Zone of central Nepal. A modestly sized village with a recorded population of 2,308 in 2021, Piskar is a part of Nepal's hilly countryside and is located about 115 kilometres (71 mi) away from the national capital of Kathmandu. The village is particularly important in 20th-century Nepalese history for the 1984 Piskar massacre, and its role as a Maoist base during the Maoist insurgency and later civil war.

== History ==
=== Piskar Massacre ===
In 1980s Nepal, Communist organisations operated despite repression from the authoritarian government led by the Nepalese monarchy. One such group was the Communist Party of Nepal (Marxist–Leninist) (CPN-ML). According to Amrit Kumar Bohara of the Communist Party of Nepal (Unified Marxist–Leninist) (CPN-UML), CPN-ML officials held a cultural program at Piskar on 1 January 1984, where they sought to raise awareness around the exploitation of the Panchayat system and encourage the villagers to strive towards equality. By 10 January, several leading figures of the CPN-ML were present in Piskar but had departed for Kathmandu by the time of the massacre.

On 15 January 1984, around 2,000 villagers from Piskar and the surrounding area gathered at the Piskar Mahadevsthan temple to celebrate Maghe Sankranti. Celebrations at a jatra at the temple included songs and skits criticising the local landlords and advocating for better treatment of the poor. In response and because of the recent presence of CPN-ML leadership, local Nepal Police forces surrounded the festival. Police were assisted by the Chief District Officer, the District Superintendent of Police, and Devi Jang Pandey who was the wealthiest local landlord. Once the festivalgoers were surrounded, police opened fire on the crowd. Two villagers - Bir Bahadur Thami and Ile Thami - were instantly killed; five others died soon after succumbing to their wounds. In addition, fifteen were seriously injured. Numerous people were also arrested, and a police dragnet and blockade arrested many more in the aftermath. Most of the arrested spent up to three years in prison without any trial, while others were tortured and disappeared. Of the 60 arrested, 12 were women.

In the immediate aftermath, a group of 31 Nepalese journalists, led by Govinda Biyogi of Mathrubhumi magazine, travelled to Piskar on January 27 to condemn the government's actions. In the long term, Piskar became a stronghold for the Nepalese Communists. The village helped shelter Jhal Nath Khanal, Astalaxmi Shakya, and Bohara from the government. Maoist activity and violence was also active in the Piskar action. One of the first acts of violence committed by the Maoists around Piskar was the killing of Devi Jang Pandey. Due to his complicity in the massacre and the perception of him as a 'feudalist' by the villagers, his murder was accepted by the villagers and seemed to affirm Maoist violence. Additionally, when arrested villagers returned from prison, they returned with a greater knowledge of class struggle and communism after learning whilst imprisoned. They helped to further spread Maoist ideology in the area.

Under the Premiership of Lokendra Bahadur Chand, Piskar villagers lodged a formal complaint with the government. Despite promises of compensation, residents received nothing from the Nepalese government. Residents have since laid blame on government officials, such as Pashupati Rana, for instigating the massacre. The seven killed became seen as martyrs by the village and area. Songs commemorating the massacre have been written by singers like JB Tuhure, and annual memorial meetings are held at Piskar. Shahid Gate and Salik were built in honour of martyrs, but construction on a memorial at Shaheed Park has been stalled since 2023.

=== Nepalese Civil War ===
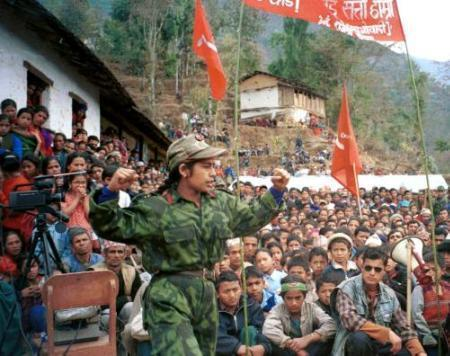
A Maoist rebel speaking at Piskar sometime between 1996 and 2002.

In the Nepalese Civil War (1996 to 2001) between Maoist groups and the monarchist government, Piskar had become a regional Maoist base by 2001. It also became a 'show village' for the Maoists to use as propaganda for foreign journalists. As written by Sara Shneiderman for The Journal of the Association for Nepal and Himalayan Studies, the village's history meant that "when the Maoists did arrive on the scene, their ideology was seen to be essentially congruent with the existing agendas of many villagers." Although Piskar villagers may not have been fully aware and conscious of Maoist ideology and history, they were attracted by the practical ideological goals of land reform and greater political power for the disenfranchised.

== Demographics ==
Piskar's residents are largely ethnically Thami and speak the Sino-Tibetan Thangmi language. Alongside them is a sizeable Chhetri community who speak Nepali. At the time of the 1991 Nepal census it had a population of 1,870 and had 366 houses in the village.

Piskar corresponds to Ward 4 within Tripurasundari Gaunpalika municipality of Sindhupalchok District. According to the 2021 Nepal census, Ward 4 had a total population of 2,308 with an almost equal sex ratio although males made up 50.4% of the population. Out of 633 households, only 26.5% (168) were female headed. The mean age at marriage for males was 21.1, whilst it was 18.5 for females. Only 70.2% of children (151 out of 215) have their births registered. The disability rate was low at 4% (92 people). In terms of education, Ward 4 had a literacy rate of 65.4%. For Ward 4's economy, 73.4% of workers were employed in agriculture. A majority of residents (96.7%) owned their homes, and homes were mainly either of a moderate (49%) or adequate (43.9%) quality. Household foundations were made mainly from mud bonded bricks/stone (53.4%) or cement bonded bricks/stone (37.6%), floors from mud (51.2%) or reinforced cement concrete (47.1%), outer walls either from mud bonded bricks/stones (53.4%) or cement bonded bricks/stones (43.9%), and most roofs were made from galvanised sheets (85.8%). Most homes used electricity for lighting (96.1%), wood for fuel to cook (94.2%), tap/piped water as their main source of drinking water (89.7%) and had a septic tank for flush toilets (94.3%). Only 0.5% of households had access to the internet. Piskar households tend to be poor (54.8% in the poorest and poorer wealth quintiles).
