= 2023 Speaker of the Koshi Provincial Assembly election =

- 12 January 2023

All 93 seats in the Koshi Provincial Assembly 47 seats needed for a majority
	First party
Candidate	Baburam Gautam
Party	Maoist Centre
Popular vote	Unopposed
Speaker before election
Pradeep Kumar Bhandari
CPN (UML)
Elected Speaker
Baburam Gautam
Maoist Centre

The 2023 Speaker of the Koshi Provincial Assembly election was held on January 12, 2023, to elect the speaker of the Koshi Provincial Assembly. However nominations have been fixed for the election from 3pm to 5pm and CPN (Maoist Centre), politician Baburam Gautam who had been nominated in accordance with the provisions of the Constitution, was the only candidate to file the nomination for the post.

== Background ==
The Koshi Provincial Assembly was formed under Article 175 of the Constitution of Nepal 2015 which guarantees a provincial legislative for each province in the country. The first provincial elections were conducted for all seven provinces in Nepal and the elections in Koshi Province were conducted for 93 seats to the assembly. The election resulted in a victory for the CPN (Unified Marxist–Leninist) and CPN (Maoist Centre) alliance which later went on to form a coalition government under Sher Dhan Rai from CPN (UML).

The first meeting of the provincial assembly was held on 5 February 2018. Pradeep Kumar Bhandari from CPN (UML) was elected as the first speaker of the Koshi Provincial assembly, and Saraswoti Pokharel from Maoist Centre as the first deputy speaker of the Koshi Provincial assembly.
