= Ram Bir Manandhar =

Nepali politician

Rambir Manandhar
- रामवीर मानन्धर

State Minister for Minister of Urban Development
- Incumbent
- Assumed office 21 November 2019
- President: Bidya Devi Bhandari
- Prime Minister: K. P. Sharma Oli

Member of Parliament, Pratinidhi Sabha
- In office 4 March 2018 – 18 September 2022
- Succeeded by: Ganesh Parajuli
- Constituency: Kathmandu 7

Member of the Constituent Assembly
- In office 21 January 2014 – 14 October 2017
- Preceded by: Hisila Yami
- Constituency: Kathmandu 7

Personal details
- Born: 10 April 1963 (age 63) Kathmandu
- Party: Nepali Congress (2026-present)
- Other party: CPN (UML) (till 2022)

Ram Bir Manandhar (Nepali: राम विर मानन्धर) is a Nepalese politician belonging to Nepali Congress. He is also the former State Minister for Minister of Urban Development. Manandhar was a member of 2nd Nepalese Constituent Assembly.

Manandhar had won Kathmandu 7 seat in 2013 Nepalese Constituent Assembly election from Communist Party of Nepal (Unified Marxist-Leninist).
