= Krishna Bahadur Rai (Nepali politician) =

Nepali politician

- कृष्ण बहादुर राई

Member of Parliament, Pratinidhi Sabha
- In office 4 March 2018 – 18 September 2022
- Preceded by: Rameshwor Phuyal
- Constituency: Kathmandu 3

Personal details
- Born: 19 August 1969 (age 56)
- Party: CPN UML

Krishna Bahadur Rai (also Krishna Rai) is a Nepali politician and a member of the House of Representatives of the federal parliament of Nepal. He was elected from Kathmandu-3 constituency, representing CPN UML of the left alliance, under the first-past-the-post electoral system. This is the first time he has been elected to parliament. He defeated his nearest rival Ambika Basnet of Nepali Congress by acquiring 19,169 votes to Basnet's 14,884.
