= Speaker of the Bagmati Provincial Assembly =

Speaker of the Bagmati Pradesh Sabha
- बागमती प्रदेशको सभामुख
- Emblem of Bagmati Province
- Incumbent; Bhuwan Kumar Pathak since 13 January 2023
- Bagmati Provincial Assembly
- Style: The Hon’ble
- Member of: Bagmati Provincial Assembly
- Appointer: Members of the Bagmati Provincial Assembly
- Term length: During the life of the Pradesh Sabha (five years maximum)
- Constituting instrument: Constitution of Nepal
- Inaugural holder: Sanu Kumar Shrestha
- Formation: 11 February 2018 (8 years ago)
- Deputy: Deputy Speaker of the Bagmati Provincial Assembly

The Speaker of the Bagmati Provincial Assembly is the presiding officer (chair) of the Provincial Assembly of Bagmati Province. The speaker is elected generally in the first meeting of the Bagmati Provincial Assembly following provincial elections. Serving for a term of five years, the speaker is chosen from sitting members of the assembly.

The position of Speaker holds significant importance in the assembly process, presiding over the proceedings, maintaining order, and ensuring fair debate and discussion. The current speaker is Bhuwan Kumar Pathak since 13 January 2023.

== Qualification ==
The Constitution of Nepal sets the qualifications required to become eligible for the office of the Speaker and Deputy Speaker. A Speaker and Deputy Speaker must meet the qualifications to become a member of the provincial assembly. A member of the provincial assembly must be:

- One who is a citizen of Nepal;
- One who is a voter of the concerned Province;
- One who has completed the age of twenty-five years;
- One who is not convicted of a criminal offense involving moral turpitude;
- One who is not disqualified by any law; and
- One who is not holding any office of profit.

== List of Speakers ==
Number	Speaker		Term of office			Assembly (election)	Party	Ref
Number	Portrait	Name	Took office	Left office	Term	Assembly (election)	Party	Ref
1		Sanu Kumar Shrestha	11 February 2018	27 October 2021	4 years, 218 days	1st (2018)	CPN (Unified Marxist-Leninist)	
2		Bhawan Kumar Pathak	13 January 2023	Incumbent	3 years, 238 days	2nd (2022)	Rastriya Prajatantra Party	

== See also ==
- Speaker of the Koshi Provincial Assembly
- Speaker of the Gandaki Provincial Assembly
- Speaker of the Lumbini Provincial Assembly
