= Astalaxmi Shakya cabinet =

- 2nd Cabinet of Bagmati Province
- Date formed: 18 August 2021
- Date dissolved: 27 October 2021

People and organisations
- Head of state: Bishnu Prasad Prasain; Yadav Chandra Sharma
- Head of government: Astalaxmi Shakya
- No. of ministers: 12
- Member parties: Communist Party of Nepal (Unified Marxist–Leninist)
- Status in legislature: Minority government
- Opposition party: Nepali Congress
- Opposition leader: Indra Bahadur Baniya, NC

History
- Election: 2017
- Legislature term: 5 years
- Predecessor: Dormani Poudel cabinet
- Successor: Rajendra Pandey cabinet

Astalaxmi Shakya was sworn in as Minority Chief Minister of Bagmati Province on 18 August 2021. After the split of CPN(UML), she's been working on Interim capacity while opposition has claimed majority. She became Chief Minister after the resignation of outgoing chief minister Dormani Poudel as both the parliamentary party leader and chief minister. Here is the list of Minister.

== Chief minister and cabinet ministers ==
Sl No.	Name	Constituency (PR if blank)	Portfolio	Took office	Left office	Political Party
Cabinet ministers
1	Astalaxmi Shakya	Kathmandu 8 (B)	Chief Minister	18 August 2021		CPN(UML)
2	Bijay Subedi	Chitwan 2(B)	Minister for Social Development	8 September 2021		CPN(UML)
3	Rachana Khadka		Minister of Economic Affairs and Planning	8 September 2021	6 January 2021	CPN(UML)
4	Dr.Ajaya Kranti Shakya	Kathmandu 9(A)	Minister of Internal Affairs and Law	8 September 2021		CPN(UML)
5	Shanti Prasad Paudel	Ramechhap 1(A)	Minister of Industry, Tourism, Forest and Environment	8 September 2021		CPN(UML)
6	Chandra Lama	Kavrepalanchok 1(B)	Minister of Land Management, Agriculture and Co-operatives	8 September 2021		CPN(UML)
7	Keshav Raj Pandey	Nuwakot 2(A)	Minister of Physical Infrastructure Development	18 August 2021		CPN(UML)
8	Pradip Kumar Katuwal Chhetri (K.C)	Sindhuli 1(B)	Minister of Health	8 September 2021		CPN(UML)
State Ministers
9	Jivan Khadka	Lalitpur 3(B)	Minister of State for Physical Infrastructure Development	8 September 2021		CPN(UML)
10	Junelimaya Shrestha		Minister of State for Social Development	8 September 2021		CPN(UML)
11	Saraswoti Bati		Minister of State for Industry, Tourism, Forest and Environment	8 September 2021		CPN(UML)
12	Badri Mainali	Nuwakot 1(B)	Minister of State for Land Management, Agriculture and Co-operatives	8 September 2021		CPN(UML)

== See also ==
- Astalaxmi Shakya
- Sher Dhan Rai cabinet
- Lalbabu Raut cabinet
- Krishna Chandra Nepali cabinet
- Kul Prasad KC cabinet
- Mahendra Bahadur Shahi cabinet
- Trilochan Bhatta cabinet
