= Santosh Chalise =

Nepalese politician

Member of Parliament, Pratinidhi Sabha
- In office 2022–2025
- Succeeded by: Rajunath Pandey
- Constituency: Kathmandu 3

Personal details
- Party: Nepali Congress

Santosh Chalise is a Nepalese politician, belonging to the Nepali Congress who served as a member of the 2nd Federal Parliament of Nepal. In the 2022 Nepalese general election, he won a seat from Kathmandu 3 (constituency). Chalise also served as the mayor of Gokarneshwor from 2017 to 2022.
