= Speaker of the Koshi Provincial Assembly =

- कोशी प्रदेश सभाका सभामुख
- Seal of Koshi Province
- Incumbent; Ambar Bahadur Bista since 9 January 2024
- Koshi Provincial Assembly
- Style: Honourable (formal); Mr. Speaker (informal)
- Status: Presiding officer
- Member of: Koshi Provincial Assembly
- Nominator: Party Offices
- Appointer: Members of the Koshi Provincial Assembly
- Term length: During the life of the Pradesh Sabha (five years maximum)
- Constituting instrument: Article 182 of the Constitution of Nepal
- Inaugural holder: Pradeep Kumar Bhandari
- Formation: 11 February 2018 (8 years ago)
- Deputy: Deputy Speaker
- Salary: रु. 53,000

The Speaker of the Koshi Provincial Assembly is the title given to the presiding officer (chair) of the Koshi Provincial Assembly. The Speaker is elected in the every first meeting of the Koshi Provincial Assembly after the general elections for a term of 5 years from among the members of the assembly. Speakers holder office until ceasing to be a member of the assembly or resigning from the office. The Speaker can be removed from office by a resolution passed in the assembly by an effective majority of its members. In the absence of Speaker, the meeting is presided by the Deputy Speaker.

== Qualification ==
The Constitution of Nepal sets the qualifications required to become eligible for the office of the Speaker and Deputy Speaker. A Speaker and Deputy Speaker must meet the qualifications to become a member of the provincial assembly. A member of the provincial assembly must be:

- One who is a citizen of Nepal;
- One who is a voter of the concerned Province;
- One who has completed the age of twenty-five years;
- One who is not convicted of a criminal offense involving moral turpitude;
- One who is not disqualified by any law; and
- One who is not holding any office of profit.

== Removal ==
"Speaker and Deputy Speaker of the Provincial Assembly shall fall vacant in any of the following circumstances:-

(a) "In case he or she ceases to be a member of the Provincial Assembly;
Provided that, in the event of the dissolution of the Provincial Assembly, the Speaker of Province and the Deputy Speaker holding their respective offices shall continue in office until the previous day of the filing of nominations for another election to the Provincial Assembly;

(b) "In case he or she tenders resignation in writing;

(c) "In case a resolution is adopted by a majority of two-thirds of the total number of the then members of the Provincial Assembly to the effect that his or her conduct is not compatible with his or her office."

== List ==
N°	Speaker		Term of office			Assembly (election)	Party	Ref
N°	Portrait	Name	Took office	Left office	Term	Assembly (election)	Party	Ref
1		Pradeep Kumar Bhandari	February 11, 2018	September 25, 2022	4 years, 226 days	1st (2017)	CPN (Unified Marxist–Leninist)	
2		Baburam Gautam	January 12, 2023	August 1, 2023	201 days	2nd (2022)	CPN (Maoist Centre)	
3		Ambar Bahadur Bista	January 9, 2024	Incumbent	2 years, 242 days	2nd (2022)	Rastriya Prajatantra Party	

== See also ==
- Speaker of the Bagmati Provincial Assembly
- Speaker of the Lumbini Provincial Assembly
- Speaker of the Sudurpashchim Provincial Assembly
