= Bhim Bahadur Bhandari =

Nepalese politician

Honourable Bhim Bahadur Bhandari
- भीम बहादुर भण्डारी

Speaker of the Sudurpashchim Provincial Assembly
- Incumbent
- Assumed office 17 January 2023
- Governor: Dev Raj Joshi
- Chief Minister: Rajendra Singh Rawal; Kamal Bahadur Shah; Dirgha Bahadur Sodari
- Deputy: Koili Devi Chaudhary
- Preceded by: Arjun Bahadur Thapa

Member of the Sudurpashchim Provincial Assembly
- Incumbent
- Assumed office 30 December 2022
- Preceded by: Devaki Malla Thapa
- Constituency: Bajhang 1(B)

Personal details
- Born: May 21, 1981 (age 44) Kedarsyu, Bajhang
- Party: CPN (Maoist Centre)
- Other political affiliations: Nepal Communist Party

Bhim Bahadur Bhandari (Nepali: भीम बहादुर भण्डारी) is a Nepalese politician and currently serving as the Speaker of the Sudurpashchim Provincial Assembly since 17 January 2023. Bhandari is a member of the 2nd Sudurpashchim Provincial Assembly. In the 2022 Nepalese provincial election, he won the election from Bajhang 1(B) (constituency).

== Electoral history ==
=== 2022 provincial elections ===
==== Bajhang 1(B) ====
Candidate	Party	Votes	%
Bhim Bahadur Bhandari	CPN (Maoist Centre)	13,879	49.56
Lal Bahadur Rawal	CPN (UML)	11,337	40.48
Birendra Bahadur Malla	Rastriya Prajatantra Party	2,272	8.11
Others		515	1.84
Total		28,003	100.00
Majority		2,542	
CPN (Maoist Centre)			
