= Rajunath Pandey =

Nepalese Politician

- राजुनाथ पान्डे

Member of Parliament, Pratinidhi Sabha
- Incumbent
- Assumed office 26 March 2026
- Preceded by: Santosh Chalise
- Constituency: Kathmandu 3

Police Chief of Kathmandu Metropolitan City Office
- In office 22 August 2022 – 16 January 2026
- Preceded by: Dhanapati Sapkota

Personal details
- Born: February 8, 1971 (age 55) Nuwakot, Nepal
- Party: Rastriya Swatantra Party

Rajunath Pandey (Note: Nepali: राजुनाथ पान्डे) (born 8 February 1971) is a Nepalese politician and former police chief of Kathmandu Metropolitan City office. He is currently serving as a member of parliament from the Rastriya Swatantra Party. He is the member of the 3rd Federal Parliament of Nepal elected from Kathmandu 3 constituency in 2026 Nepalese General Election securing 18,757 votes and defeating Kulman Ghising, the chairman of Ujyaalo Nepal Party.

He had previously served as a police Chief of Kathmandu Metropolitan City under the former Mayor of Kathmandu Balendra Shah.

== Personal life and education ==
Pandey was born in Nuwakot, on February 8, 1971. He was born to Oj Lal Pandey. He completed his master's degree from Tribhuvan University.

== Politics ==
He resgined from his job ahead of the 2026 general election and began his political journey by joining the Rastriya Swatantra Party in 2026. He contested the 2026 Nepalese general election from the Kathmandu 3 constituency and won by a margin of 7,586 votes. He defeated Kul Man Ghising, president of Ujyaalo Nepal Party and Ramesh Aryal of Nepali Congress.

== Electoral performance ==
Election	Year	Constituency	Contested for	Political party	Result	Votes	% of votes	Ref.
Nepal general election	2026	Kathmandu 3	Pratinidhi Sabha member	Rastriya Swatantra Party	Won	18,757	44.75%	
