= Sindhupalchok 2 =

Parliamentary constituency in Bagmati Province, Nepal

- Parliamentary constituency
- Sindhupalchok 2 in Bagmati Province
- Province: Bagmati Province
- District: Sindhupalchok District
- Major settlements: Melamchi

Current constituency
- Created: 1991
- Party: Nepali Communist Party
- Member of Parliament: Yubaraj Dulal
- Local Levels: Indrawati Rural Municipality; Helambu Rural Municipality; Panchpokhari Thangpal Rural Municipality; Melamchi Municipality; Chautara Sangachokgadhi Municipality (Wards 1, 5–8, 11–14)

Sindhupalchok 2 is one of two parliamentary constituencies of Sindhupalchok District in Nepal. This constituency came into existence on the Constituency Delimitation Commission (CDC) report submitted on 31 August 2017.

== Incorporated areas ==
Sindhupalchok 2 parliamentary constituency incorporates Indrawati Rural Municipality, Helambu Rural Municipality, Panchpokhari Thangpal Rural Municipality, Melamchi Municipaliaty and, wards 1, 5–8 and 11–14 of Chautera Sangachokgadhi Municipality.

== Assembly segments ==
It encompasses the following Bagmati Provincial Assembly segment

- Sindhupalchok 2(A)
- Sindhupalchok 2(B)

== Members of Parliament ==
=== Parliament/Constituent Assembly ===
Election	Member	Party
1991	Krishna Raj Shrestha	CPN (Unified Marxist–Leninist)
1994	Bishnu Bikram Thapa	Rastriya Prajatantra Party
1999	Subas Karmacharya	CPN (Unified Marxist–Leninist)
2008	Agni Prasad Sapkota	CPN (Maoist)
January 2009	Agni Prasad Sapkota	UCPN (Maoist)
May 2016	Agni Prasad Sapkota	CPN (Maoist Centre)
2017	Sher Bahadur Tamang	CPN (Unified Marxist–Leninist)
May 2018	Sher Bahadur Tamang	Nepal Communist Party
March 2021	Sher Bahadur Tamang	CPN (Unified Marxist–Leninist)
2022	Mohan Bahadur Basnet	Nepali Congress
2026	Yubaraj Dulal	Nepali Communist Party

=== Provincial Assembly ===
==== 2(A) ====
Election	Member	Party
2017	Yuvaraj Dulal	CPN (Maoist Centre)
May 2018	Yuvaraj Dulal	Nepal Communist Party

==== 2(B) ====
Election	Member	Party
2017	Nima Lama	Nepali Congress

== Election results ==
=== Election in the 2020s ===
==== 2022 general election ====
Candidate	Party	Votes	%
Mohan Bahadur Basnet	Nepali Congress	39,381	53.49
Sher Bahadur Tamang	CPN (UML)	27,515	37.37
Narsimha Shrestha	Rastriya Prajatantra Party	2,820	3.83
Maya Gurung	Rastriya Swatantra Party	2,453	3.33
Others		1,453	1.97
Total		73,622	100.00
Majority		11,866	
Nepali Congress gain			

=== Election in the 2010s ===
==== 2017 legislative elections ====
Party	Candidate	Votes
CPN (Unified Marxist–Leninist)	Sher Bahadur Tamang	38,401
Rastriya Prajatantra Party (Democratic)	Pashupati SJB Rana	30,369
Unified Rastriya Prajatantra Party (Nationalist)	Chandra Dutta Khatiwada	1,341
CPN (Marxist–Leninist)	Bir Bahadur Tamang	1,279
Others		444
Invalid votes		6,104
Result	Maoist Centre gain	
Source: Election Commission

==== 2017 Nepalese provincial elections ====
===== Sindhupalchok 2(A) =====
Party	Candidate	Votes
CPN (Maoist Centre)	Yuvaraj Dulal	20,687
Nepali Congress	Bikash Tamang	13,521
Others		1,179
Invalid votes		1,826
Result	Maoist Centre gain	
Source: Election Commission

===== Sindhupalchok 2(B) =====
Party	Candidate	Votes
Nepali Congress	Nima Lama	18,905
CPN (Maoist Centre)	Dawa Tamang	18,708
Others		1,131
Invalid votes		1,786
Result	Congress gain	
Source: Election Commission

==== 2013 Constituent Assembly election ====
Party	Candidate	Votes
UCPN (Maoist)	Agni Prasad Sapkota	12,808
CPN (Unified Marxist–Leninist)	Subas Karmacharya	12,158
Rastriya Prajatantra Party	Bishnu Bikram Thapa	6,391
Nepali Congress	Bikash Lama	6,375
CPN (Marxist–Leninist)	Krishna Bahadur Thakuri	1,226
Others		1,362
Result	Maoist hold	
Source: NepalNews

=== Election in the 2000s ===
==== 2008 Constituent Assembly election ====
Party	Candidate	Votes
CPN (Maoist)	Agni Prasad Sapkota	30,175
CPN (Unified Marxist–Leninist)	Subas Karmacharya	10,063
Nepali Congress	Bhupendra Bahadur Thapa	5,241
Rastriya Prajatantra Party	Babu Ram Khadka	2,743
CPN (Marxist–Leninist)	Ambika Silwal	2,094
Others		1,698
Invalid votes		3,042
Result	Maoist gain	
Source: Election Commission

=== Election in the 1990s ===
==== 1999 legislative elections ====
Party	Candidate	Votes
CPN (Unified Marxist–Leninist)	Subas Karmacharya	17,897
Rastriya Prajatantra Party	Bishnu Bikram Thapa	12,138
Nepali Congress	Rajendra Man Talchabhadel	7,540
CPN (Marxist–Leninist)	Sudarshan Pradhan	1,898
Independent	Prem Bahadur Adhikari	1,096
Others		1,681
Invalid Votes		1,413
Result	CPN (UML) gain	
Source: Election Commission

==== 1994 legislative elections ====
Party	Candidate	Votes
Rastriya Prajatantra Party	Bishnu Bikram Thapa	14,893
CPN (Unified Marxist–Leninist)	Subas Karmacharya	10,289
Nepali Congress	Binod Lama Moktan	9,427
Others		1,162
Result	RPP gain	
Source: Election Commission

==== 1991 legislative elections ====
Party	Candidate	Votes
CPN (Unified Marxist–Leninist)	Krishna Raj Shrestha	7,818
Nepali Congress	Binod Lama Moktan	7,166
Result	CPN (UML) gain	

== See also ==
- List of parliamentary constituencies of Nepal
