= Ganesh Parajuli =

Nepali politician

Honourable Ganesh Parajuli
- गणेश पराजुली

Member of the House of Representatives
- Incumbent
- Assumed office 22 December 2022
- Preceded by: Ram Bir Manandhar
- Constituency: Kathmandu 7

Deputy parliamentary leader of the Pratinidhi Sabha
- Incumbent
- Assumed office 26 March 2026
- Leader: Balendra Shah
- Preceded by: Position established

Personal details
- Born: 29 July 1979 (age 47) Khotang, Nepal
- Party: Rastriya Swatantra Party
- Spouse: Rina Bajracharya
- Education: Proficiency Certificate

Ganesh Parajuli (Note: Nepali: गणेश पराजुली) (born 29 July 1979) is a Nepalese politician and member of the Rastriya Swatantra Party. He was elected in 2022 from Kathmandu 7 to the House of Representatives.

== See also ==
- Rastriya Swatantra Party
