= Maiti Nepal =

Non-profit organization in Nepal

- Formation: April 1993
- Type: Non-profit organization
- Headquarters: Kathmandu
- Location: Nepal
- Founder/Director: Anuradha Koirala
- Website: maitinepal.org

Maiti Nepal (Nepali: माइती नेपाल) is a non-profit organization in Nepal dedicated to helping the victims of human trafficking. Currently, it operates a rehabilitation home in Kathmandu, transit homes at the Indo-Nepal border towns, preventive homes in the countryside, and an academy in Kathmandu.

The word ‘Maiti' has no literal interpretation in English but in the Nepali language the word ‘maiti' means the home of the girl's birth parents. The word itself holds sentimental value for the women's population of Nepal, "especially for a married Nepali woman who has no longer any right towards her parents or their property". Once a girl is married to another man, she becomes a perpetual member of her husband's family. She has all obligations to her husband and her new family. As this organization is home to all the girls, women, and children who are not accepted into their families and society, this NGO has been named ‘Maiti' Nepal to symbolize the love and affection that a girl receives in her birth parent's place.

== History ==
Maiti Nepal was established in 1993 by a group of socially committed professionals in order "to protect Nepali girls and women from crimes like domestic violence, trafficking for flesh trade, child prostitution, child labor and various other forms of exploitation and torture". Since 1993, this organization has been working towards "preventing trafficking for forced prostitution, rescuing flesh trade victims and rehabilitating them". After rescuing women and children, this organization also works vigorously towards finding "justice for the victimized girls and women by engaging in criminal investigation and waging legal battles against the criminals". Due to continuous efforts, this organization has been able to raise awareness regarding this crucial issue of girl trafficking at international levels.

== Objective ==
The main objective of Maiti Nepal is to provide comprehensive prevention of girls trafficking, rescuing and rehabilitating the survivors, advocating for justice in the cases of the rescued women and girls, and ensuring that effective immediate action is taken against their traffickers.

== Founder of Maiti Nepal ==
Anuradha Koirala was born in 1949, to parents Colonel Pratap Singh Gurung and Laxmi Gurung. She was called dijju means [elder sister] by the ones who she saved. She completed her schooling at a convent school in Kalimpong, India. Her inspiration to establish an organization for the betterment of the women's population came from her bitter relationship with her husband, Dinesh Prasad Koirala. Her highest inspiration was Mother Teresa. After several years of violence, abuse, and three miscarriages, she separated from her husband. Anuradha Koirala established Maiti Nepal in 1993 with the aim of providing services for both children and women who have endured untold pain and suffering, often in silence. She not only established Maiti Nepal, but she also set up transit homes, academic and medical centre to provide support to the women and children who had no other place to go.

== Maiti Nepal's Centers ==
Maiti Nepal has three prevention homes, fourteen transit homes, a hospice, eight information desks, and Teresa Academy. The data for the centres of Maiti Nepal has been taken from the website of South Asia Foundation.

=== Transit homes ===
The transit homes of Maiti Nepal are located in different locations across Nepal, as listed below.

- Pashupatinagar Illam
- Kakarvita, Jhapa
- Biratnagar, Morang
- Birgunj, Parsa
- Bhairawa, Rupandehi
- Nepalgunj, Banke
- Dhangadhi, Kailali
- Kathmandu, Thankot
- Maheshpur, Nawalparasi
- Mahendranagr, Kanchanpur

=== Rehabilitation centers ===
The two rehabilitation centres of Maiti Nepal are located in Kathmandu and Ithari.

- Women Rehabilitation Centre, Kathmandu
- Women Rehabilitation Centre, Ithari

=== Prevention homes ===
- Chisapaani - Nuwakot
- Bardaghat - Nawalparasi
- Hetauda – Makwanpur
- Chitwan - Bharatpur

=== Hospice ===
- Satighatta - Jhapa District Eastern Nepal

== Facilities ==
The transit homes, rehabilitation and medical centres of Maiti Nepal are well facilitated to provide support and assistance to the rescued women, children and girls.

The data for the facilities provided by Maiti Nepal has been extracted from the website of the Mother's Home Nepal website.

=== Rehabilitation centers ===
These centers provide shelter, safety, education and vocational training, and medical care to the rescued women and children.

=== Prevention programs ===
This program provides information to vulnerable girls with information and education about human trafficking. This program also provides temporary shelter and residential services to these girls.

=== Hospices ===
The hospices provide treatment to those suffering from psychological disorders, and anti-retro-viral treatment for HIV/AIDS patients.

=== Halfway houses ===
These types of houses provide shelter and protection to underage girls who are working in places like dance restaurants and massage parlors.

=== Medical clinic ===
The medical clinic was built to provide treatment to diseased women and children. There is a full-time doctor with a team of girls to look after the suffering women and children.

== Activities ==
Maiti Nepal organizes several activities including awareness campaigns regarding sex trafficking, rescue operations for the trafficked women and girls, apprehending traffickers, providing legal support to the needy, women empowerment programmes, and providing anti-retroviral therapy (ART) to HIV-infected children and women.

The organization provides halfway homes for the survivors of trafficking. It provides educational support to children and women who have a desire for learning. It also provides psychological counseling, support, and life skills to girls/women who are at risk of being trafficked. The main activity includes rescuing other girls by setting up a team of survivors of trafficking. This team of girls talks to the girls who they suspect are being traded by the traffickers.

== Awards ==
As the founder and director of Maiti Nepal, Anuradha Koirala won the CNN Hero of the Year award in 2010. She had previously received the Courage of Conscience Award from The Peace Abbey in Sherborn, Massachusetts on August 25, 2006.

The United States government has given a two-year grant of $500,000 to Maiti Nepal in April 2010.

Until now, Anuradha Koirala has received 30 national and international awards for her courageous acts and lifetime achievement furthering the cause of children's and women's rights. She was conferred the Padma Shri—the fourth highest civilian honour by the Government of India—on the occasion of India’s 68th Republic Day in 2017.

On 13 January 2025, the Government of Nepal gave a grant of Rs.10 million to Maiti Nepal to bolster its revolving fund. The rehabilitation shelter, child protection home, HIV-treatment center, and school have been making continuous efforts in humanitarian aid in the country.

== Criticism ==
One of the major drawbacks of Maiti Nepal's work has been in rehabilitating former prostitutes. The other criticism raised against this organization's work is with its affiliation with an Indian Organization named STOP. STOP has been accused of raiding brothels at midnight and then taking away the girls forcefully and later subjecting them to various kinds of threats. Since Maiti Nepal is affiliated with STOP so when this organization is accused of any issue then it ultimately becomes a concern for Maiti Nepal as STOP hands over all its rescued girls to Maiti Nepal.

In May 2013 the Nepalese Supreme Court ordered Maiti Nepal to release a woman the court determined was being held against her will for the purpose of counseling her for being a lesbian.
