= Indrawati Rural Municipality =

Rural municipality in Bagmati Province, Nepal

Indrawati Gaunpalika ईन्द्रावती गाउँपालिका
- Rural Municipality
- Indrawati Rural Municipality
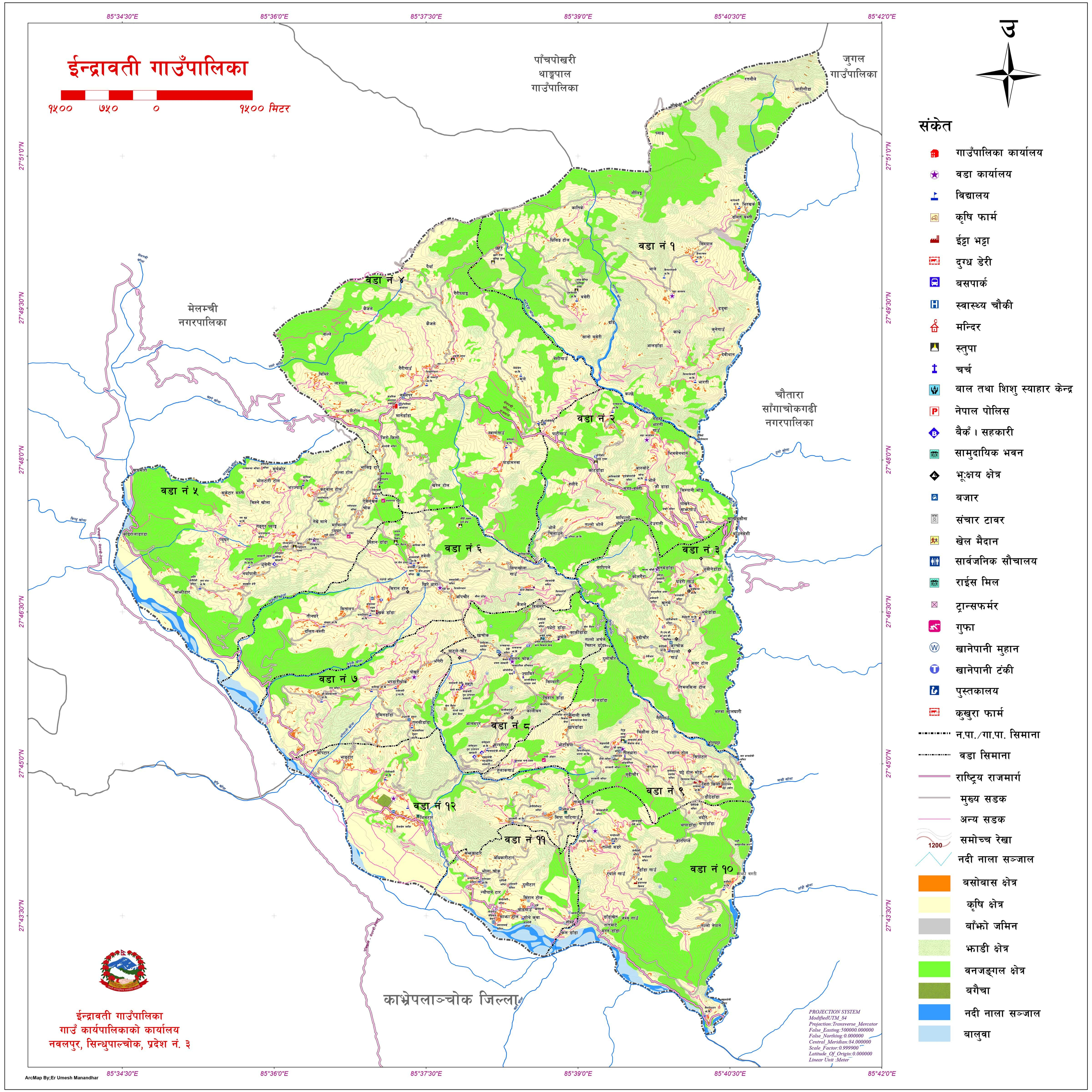

Indrawati (Nepali: ईन्द्रावती गाउँपालिका) is a rural municipality located in Sindhupalchok District of Bagmati Province of Nepal.

== Twin towns – sister cities ==
- Jersey City, New Jersey, United States
