= Bhumi Tripathi =

Nepali politician

Bhumi Prasad Tripathi
- भूमि प्रसाद त्रिपाठी

Member of Parliament, Pratinidhi Sabha
- In office 4 March 2018 – 18 September 2022
- Preceded by: Dhan Bahadur Ghale
- Constituency: Dhading 1

Personal details
- Born: 1965 (age 60–61)
- Party: CPN (UML)

Bhumi Tripathi is a Nepalese Politician and serving as the Member Of House Of Representatives (Nepal) elected from Dhading-3, Bagmati pradesh. He is the member of the Presidium of Nepal Communist Party and the former member of Communist Party of Nepal (Unified Marxist–Leninist). He was also the President of the former Communist Party of Nepal (Unified Marxist–Leninist) for the district of Dhading; he is a great politician (by Aashish Bhandari) .
