= Krishna Prasad Sharma Khanal =

Nepalese politician

Honourable Krishna Prasad Sharma Khanal
- कृष्णप्रसाद शर्मा खनाल

Member of Bagmati Provincial Assembly
- Incumbent
- Assumed office 2022
- Constituency: Chitwan 1(B)

Personal details
- Party: CPN (Unified Socialist)

Krishna Prasad Sharma Khanal (Nepali: कृष्णप्रसाद शर्मा खनाल) is a Nepalese politician belonging to CPN (Unified Socialist). He serves as a member of Provincial Assembly from Chitwan 1(B).

Khanal, who served as a minister in the previous government, is currently the parliamentary party leader in the provincial assembly.

== See also ==
- CPN (Unified Socialist)
