= Amrit Kumar Bohara =

Nepali politician

Personal details
- Party: Nepal Communist Party
- Spouse: Astalaxmi Shakya

Amrit Kumar Bohara (Nepali: अमृतकुमार बोहरा), born April 27, 1948, is a leader of the Communist Party of Nepal (Unified Marxist-Leninist) (CPN-UML). He is a member of the Standing Committee of the party and was its acting General Secretary.

Bohara was released in early May 2005 along with his colleague, CPN-UML General Secretary Madhav Kumar Nepal, after being detained for several months on King Gyanendra's orders.

Bohara was the top candidate of CPN-UML in the proportional representation list for the April 2008 Constituent Assembly election. Following the election, in which the CPN-UML was defeated, Madhav Kumar Nepal resigned as General Secretary and Bohara became acting General Secretary.

== See also ==
- Politics of Nepal
- History of Nepal

Party political offices
Preceded by Madhav Kumar Nepal	General Secretary of the Communist Party of Nepal (Unified Marxist-Leninist); 2008	Succeeded by Jhala Nath Khanal
