= Dhading 1 =

Parliamentary constituency in Nepal

- Parliamentary constituency
- Dhading 1 in Bagmati Province
- Province: Bagmati Province
- District: Dhading District

Current constituency
- Created: 1991
- Party: Communist Party of Nepal (Unified Socialist)
- Member: Rajendra Prasad Pandey

Dhading 1 is one of two parliamentary constituencies of Dhading District in Nepal. This constituency came into existence on the Constituency Delimitation Commission (CDC) report submitted on 31 August 2017.

== Incorporated areas ==
Dhading 1 parliamentary constituency incorporates Benighat Rorang Rural Municipality, Siddhalek Rural Municipality, Gajuri Rural Municipality, Galchhi Rural Municipality, Thakre Rural Municipality and Dhunibesi Municipality.

== Assembly segments ==
It encompasses the following Bagmati Provincial Assembly segment

- Dhading 1(A)
- Dhading 1(B)

== Members of Parliament ==
=== Parliament/Constituent Assembly ===
Election	Member	Party
1991	Daman Pakhrin Tamang	Nepali Congress
1994	Budhhiman Tamang	Rastriya Prajatantra Party
2008	Pushpa Bikram Malla	CPN (Maoist)
January 2009	Pushpa Bikram Malla	UCPN (Maoist)
2013	Dhan Bahadur Ghale	CPN (Unified Marxist–Leninist)
2017	Bhumi Prasad Tripathi	CPN (Unified Marxist–Leninist)
May 2018	Bhumi Prasad Tripathi	Nepal Communist Party
March 2021	Bhumi Prasad Tripathi	CPN (Unified Marxist–Leninist)
2022	Rajendra Prasad Pandey	CPN (Unified Socialist)

=== Provincial Assembly ===
==== 1(A) ====
Election	Member	Party
2017	Rajendra Prasad Pandey	CPN (Unified Marxist–Leninist)
May 2018	Rajendra Prasad Pandey	Nepal Communist Party
March 2021	Rajendra Prasad Pandey	CPN (Unified Marxist–Leninist)
August 2021	Rajendra Prasad Pandey	CPN (Unified Socialist)

==== 1(B) ====
Election	Member	Party
2017	Shalik Ram Jamkattel	CPN (Maoist Centre)
May 2018	Shalik Ram Jamkattel	Nepal Communist Party

== Election results ==
=== Election in the 2020s ===
==== 2022 general election ====
Candidate	Party	Votes	%
Rajendra Prasad Pandey	CPN (Unified Socialist)	36,018	46.22
Bhumi Tripathi	CPN (UML)	27,997	35.92
Himesh Panta	Rastriya Swatantra Party	12,494	16.03
Others		1,426	1.83
Total		77,935	100.00
Majority		8,021	
CPN (Unified Socialist) gain			

=== Election in the 2010s ===
==== 2017 legislative elections ====
Party	Candidate	Votes
CPN (Unified Marxist–Leninist)	Bhumi Prasad Tripathi	49,121
Nepali Congress	Bishwa Prasad Aryal	21,968
Janasamajbadi Party Nepal	Rajan Magar	2,060
Others		1,021
Invalid votes		4,893
Result	CPN (UML) gain	
Source: Election Commission

==== 2017 Nepalese provincial elections ====
===== Dhading 1(A) =====
Party	Candidate	Votes
CPN (Unified Marxist–Leninist)	Rajendra Prasad Pandey	27,332
Nepali Congress	Madu Kumar Shreshta	13,647
Others		891
Invalid votes		1,615
Result	CPN UML) gain	
Source: Election Commission

===== Dhading 1(B) =====
Party	Candidate	Votes
CPN (Maoist Centre)	Shalik Ram Jamkattel	23,382
Nepali Congress	Prabhat Kiran Subedi	10,407
Others		517
Result	Maoist Centre gain	
Source: Election Commission

==== 2013 Constituent Assembly election ====
Party	Candidate	Votes
CPN (Unified Marxist–Leninist)	Dhan Bahadur Ghale	8,663
Nepali Congress	Tilak Prasad Ruwali	7,656
Rastriya Prajatantra Party	Budhhiman Tamang	6,945
UCPN (Maoist)	Pushpa Bikram Malla	6,697
CPN (Marxist–Leninist)	Bharat Prasad Nepal	1,002
Others		803
Result	CPN (UML) gain	
Source: NepalNews

=== Election in the 2000s ===
==== 2008 Constituent Assembly election ====
Party	Candidate	Votes
CPN (Maoist)	Pushpa Bikram Malla	29,555
Nepali Congress	Dil Man Pakhrin	8,940
CPN (Unified Marxist–Leninist)	Ram Hari Adhikari	7,393
Rastriya Janashakti Party	Dil Bahadur Lama	1,549
CPN (Marxist–Leninist)	Bharat Prasad Nepal	1,373
Others		1,168
Result	Maoist gain	
Source: Election Commission

=== Election in the 1990s ===
==== 1999 legislative elections ====
Party	Candidate	Votes
Rastriya Prajatantra Party	Budhhiman Tamang	19,055
Nepali Congress	Dil Man Pakhrin	17,702
CPN (Unified Marxist–Leninist)	Ram Hari Adhikari	9,631
Others		1,300
Invalid Votes		1,151
Result	RPP hold	
Source: Election Commission

==== 1994 legislative elections ====
Party	Candidate	Votes
Rastriya Prajatantra Party	Budhhiman Tamang	18,436
Nepali Congress	Daman Pakhrin Tamang	10,824
Result	RPP gain	
Source: Election Commission

==== 1991 legislative elections ====
Party	Candidate	Votes
Nepali Congress	Daman Pakhrin Tamang	14,157
Rastriya Prajatantra Party (Thapa)	Budhhiman Tamang	10,775
Result	Congress gain	

== See also ==
- List of parliamentary constituencies of Nepal
