= Desh Bikash Party =

Political party in Nepal

Country Development Party देश विकास पार्टी
- Chairman: Ananta Raj Ghimire
- Founded: 13 July 2022 (3 years ago)
- Preceded by: Hamro Nepali
- Merged into: Rastriya Swatantra Party
- Colours
- Seats in Pratinidhi Sabha: 0 / 275
- Seats in Rastriya Sabha: 0 / 59
- Seats in Bagmati Provincial Assembly: 2 / 110

Election symbol

Website
- hamronepaliparty.com

The Desh Bikash Party (Nepali: देश विकास पार्टी, lit. 'Country Development Party') was a political party in Nepal. The party was registered in the Election Commission on 13 July 2022, with the Cane (Lauro; lit. Walking Stick) as its election symbol. The party's chairman was Ananta Raj Ghimire. The party later got merged into Rastriya Swatantra Party.

== History ==
The party was founded by 'lauro campaign' activists who were supporters of independent candidates Balendra Shah of Kathmandu and Harka Sampang of Dharan, both of whom were elected mayors of their respective cities and had contested the elections using the 'lauro' election symbol at the 2022 local elections. The party registered itself to contest the 2022 general and provincial elections.

The party's candidate Shailendra Man Bajracharya was elected to the Bagmati Provincial Assembly from Kathmandu 8 (A) and the party also won a seat through the party list voting. The party's candidates for House of Representative seats in Kathmandu 8 and Lalitpur 2 finished second in their constituencies.

== Electoral performance ==
=== General election ===
| Election | Leader | Party list votes | | Seats | Position | Resulting government |
| Election | Leader | No. | % | Seats | Position | Resulting government |
|---|---|---|---|---|---|---|
| 2022 | Ananta Raj Ghimire | 55,743 | 0.53 | 0 / 275 | 13th | Extra-parliamentary |

=== Provincial election ===
| Province | Election | Party list votes | | Seats | Position | Resulting government |
| Province | Election | No. | % | Seats | Position | Resulting government |
|---|---|---|---|---|---|---|
| Bagmati | 2022 | 47,893 | 2.47 | 2 / 110 | 7th | |

== See also ==
- Rastriya Swatantra Party
