= Bagmati Provincial Assembly =

Provincial assembly of Nepal

Bagmati Provincial Assembly बागमती प्रदेश सभा
- 2nd Bagmati Provincial Assembly

Type
- Type: Unicameral legislature of Bagmati Province

History
- Founded: 2018

Leadership
- Speaker: Bhuwan Kumar Pathak, RPP since 13 January 2023
- Deputy Speaker: Apsara Chapagain Khatri, UML since 17 January 2023
- Leader of the House: Indra Bahadur Baniya, NC since 4 August 2025
- Leader of Opposition: Shalikram Jamkattel, Nepali Communist Party since 24 July 2024

Structure
- Political groups: Government (39): Congress: 37; HNP: 2; Opposition (71): NCP: 28; CPN (UML): 27; RPP: 13; NMKP: 3
- Length of term: 5 years

Elections
- Voting system: Parallel voting: 66 seats – FPtP; 44 seats – PR
- First election: 2017
- Last election: 20 November 2022
- Next election: 2027

Meeting place
- Regional Educational Directorate, Hetauda, Makwanpur District

Website
- provincialassembly.bagamati.gov.np

Constitution
- Constitution of Nepal

The Provincial Assembly of Bagmati Province also known as the Bagmati Pradesh Sabha, (Nepali: वाग्मती प्रदेश सभा) is a unicameral governing and law making body of Bagmati Province, one of the seven provinces in Nepal. The assembly is seated in the provincial capital at Hetauda in Makwanpur District at the Regional Educational Directorate Office. The assembly has 110 members of whom 66 are elected through first-past-the-post voting and 44 of whom are elected through proportional representation. The term of the assembly is five years unless dissolved earlier.

The present First Provincial Assembly was constituted in 2017 after the 2017 provincial elections. The election resulted in a majority for the alliance of CPN (Unified Marxist–Leninist) and CPN (Maoist Centre). The current assembly was elected in November 2022.

== History ==
The Provincial Assembly of Bagmati Province is formed under Article 175 of the Constitution of Nepal 2015 which guarantees a provincial legislature for each province in the country. The first provincial elections were conducted for all seven provinces in Nepal and the elections in Bagmati Province was conducted for 110 seats to the assembly. The election resulted in a victory for the CPN (Unified Marxist–Leninist) and CPN (Maoist Centre) alliance which later went on to form a coalition government under Dormani Poudel from CPN (UML). The first meeting of the assembly was called by Governor Anuradha Koirala for 1 February 2018. Sanu Kumar Shrestha from the CPN (UML) was elected as the first speaker of the provincial assembly, and Radhika Tamang from Maoist Centre was elected as the first deputy speaker. In May 2018, the two parties merged and formed the Nepal Communist Party which had a supermajority in the assembly.

== List of Assemblies ==
Election Year	Assembly	Start of term	End of term	Speaker	Chief Minister	Party
2017	1st Assembly	1 February 2018	September 2022	Sanu Kumar Shrestha	Dor Mani Poudel (Cabinet)	CPN (Unified Marxist–Leninist)
2017	1st Assembly	1 February 2018	September 2022	Sanu Kumar Shrestha	Astalaxmi Shakya (Cabinet)	CPN (Unified Marxist–Leninist)
2017	1st Assembly	1 February 2018	September 2022	Sanu Kumar Shrestha	Rajendra Prasad Pandey (Cabinet)	CPN (Unified Socialist)
2022	2nd Assembly	2 January 2023	23 July 2024	Bhuwan Kumar Pathak	Shalikram Jamkattel (Cabinet)	CPN (Maoist Centre)
2022	2nd Assembly	24 July 2024	4 August 2025	Bhuwan Kumar Pathak	Bahadur Singh Lama (Cabinet)	Nepali Congress
2022	2nd Assembly	5 August 2025	Incumbent	Bhuwan Kumar Pathak	Indra Bahadur Baniya (Cabinet)	Nepali Congress

== Committees ==
Article 195 of the Constitution of Nepal provides provincial assemblies the power to form special committees in order to manage working procedures.

S.No.	Committee	Membership
1	Provincial Affairs	22
2	Finance and Development	20
3	Public Accounts	20
4	Education, Health and Agriculture	20
5	Industry, Tourism and Environment	19

== Current composition ==
Party	Parliamentary party leader	Seats
Nepali Congress	Indra Bahadur Baniya	37
CPN (UML)	Jagannath Thapaliya	27
CPN (Maoist Centre)	Shalikram Jamkattel	21
Rastriya Prajatantra Party	Udhhav Thapa	13
CPN (Unified Socialist)	Krishna Prasad Sharma Khanal	7
Nepal Majdoor Kisan Party	Surendra Raj Gosai	3
Hamro Nepali Party	Shailendra Man Bajracharya	2
Total		110

== See also ==
- Bagmati Province
- Provincial assemblies of Nepal
