= Shalikram Jamkattel =

Nepalese politician

- शालिकराम जमकट्टेल
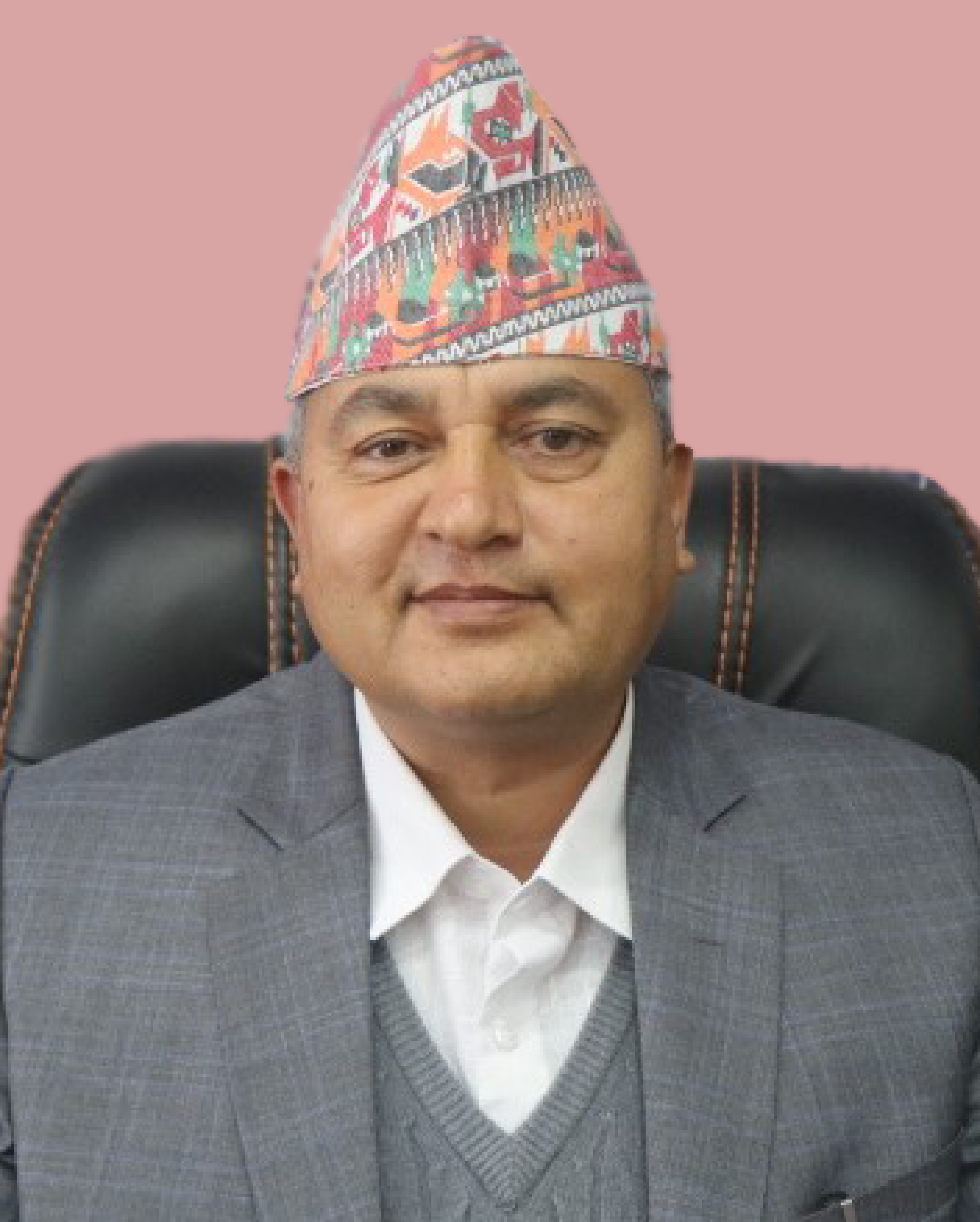

4th Chief Minister of Bagmati Province
- In office 10 January 2023 – 23 July 2024
- President: Ram Chandra Paudel
- Governor: Yadav Chandra Sharma
- Deputy: Bahadur Singh Lama
- Preceded by: Rajendra Prasad Pandey

Minister of Economic Affairs and Planning of Bagmati Province
- In office 27 October 2021 – 23 December 2022
- Governor: Yadav Chandra Sharma
- Chief Minister: Rajendra Prasad Pandey

Member of the Bagmati Provincial Assembly
- Incumbent
- Assumed office 2017
- Preceded by: Post created
- Constituency: Dhading 1(B)

Personal details
- Born: Dhading, Nepal
- Party: Communist Party of Nepal (Maoist Centre)
- Occupation: Politician

Salikram Jamkattel (Nepali:शालिकराम जमकट्टेल) is a Nepalese politician who served as the former chief minister of Bagmati Province. He was elected from Dhading 1(B).

== See also ==
- Hikmat Kumar Karki
- Saroj Kumar Yadav
- Surendra Raj Pandey
- Dilli Bahadur Chaudhary
- Raj Kumar Sharma
- Kamal Bahadur Shah

Political offices
Preceded by Rajendra Prasad Pandey	Chief Minister of Bagmati Province; 2023-	Succeeded by Bahadur Singh Lama
