= Rameshwor Phuyal =

Nepali politician

- रामेश्वर फुयाल

Member of 2nd Constituent Assembly
- Incumbent
- Assumed office 2013
- Constituency: Kathmandu-3

Personal details
- Party: Communist Party of Nepal (Unified Marxist-Leninist)

Rameshwor Phuyal (Nepali: रामेश्वर फुयाल) is a member of 2nd Nepalese Constituent Assembly. He won Kathmandu–3 seat in 2013 Nepalese Constituent Assembly election from Communist Party of Nepal (Unified Marxist-Leninist).
