= Astalaxmi Shakya =

Nepali politician and former chief minister of Bagmati Province

Honourable Astalaxmi Shakya
- अष्टलक्ष्मी शाक्य

2nd Chief Minister of Bagmati Province
- In office 18 August 2021 – 27 October 2021
- Governor: Bishnu Prasad Prasain; Yadav Chandra Sharma
- Preceded by: Dormani Poudel
- Succeeded by: Rajendra Prasad Pandey

Minister for Industry
- In office 18 August 2008 – 25 May 2009
- President: Ram Baran Yadav
- Prime Minister: Pushpa Kamal Dahal
- Preceded by: Shyam Sundar Gupta
- Succeeded by: Mahendra Raya Yadav

Minister for Women, Children and Social Welfare
- In office 2004–2005
- Monarch: Gyanendra
- Prime Minister: Sher Bahadur Deuba
- Preceded by: Renu Kumari Yadav
- Succeeded by: Durga Shrestha

Member of the Provincial Assembly of Bagmati Province
- In office 1 February 2018 – 2022
- Preceded by: Constituency created
- Succeeded by: Uddhav Thapa
- Constituency: Kathmandu 8 (B)

Member of the House of Representatives
- In office 1999–2008
- Preceded by: Sahana Pradhan
- Succeeded by: Hit Man Shakya (as member of the Constituent Assembly)
- Constituency: Kathmandu 6

Member of the Constituent Assembly / Legislature Parliament
- In office 28 May 2008 – 14 October 2017
- Constituency: Party list

Personal details
- Born: 30 September 1953 (age 72) Jhochhen, Kathmandu, Nepal
- Party: Communist Party of Nepal (UML) (before 2018, 2021–present)
- Other party: Nepal Communist Party (NCP) (2018–2021)
- Spouse: Amrit Kumar Bohara
- Parent(s): Tirtha Bahadur Shakya (father); Kulmaya Shakya (mother)
- Cabinet: Astalaxmi Shakya Cabinet

Astalaxmi Shakya (Nepali: अष्टलक्ष्मी शाक्य) is a Nepalese politician and former Chief Minister of Bagmati Province. She is first woman chief minister of Nepal. Governor Bishnu Prasad Prasain appointed Shakya as the chief minister as per Article 168 (1) of the Constitution of Nepal after she was unanimously elected parliamentary party leader of the CPN (UML) on 18 August 2021, following the resignation of outgoing chief minister Dormani Poudel, as both the parliamentary party leader and chief minister. On 9 March 2023 she was chosen as a candidate in the 2023 Nepalese vice presidential election from Communist Party of Nepal (UML).

First elected to parliament in 1999, Shakya served as the Minister for Women, Children and Social Welfare from 2004 to 2005 and Ministry for Industry from 2008 to 2009. She also currently serves as the vice-president of the Communist Party of Nepal (Unified Marxist–Leninist).

== Early life and education ==
Shakya was born in Kathmandu in 1954. She was born on the eighth day of Dashain festival on the day culturally known as Astami, which is how she got her name. She was a second child among eight in a Newar family at Jhochhen, near Hanuman Dhoka Durbar Square. After the completion of School Leaving Certificate in 1972 she joined a Chinese language class at Basantapur with her friend Sulochana Manandhar, who is now a writer. The two girls were often seen doing quite unusual activities for girls in those days – like riding bicycles or driving cars, swimming and doing physical exercises.

Shakya went to Ratna Rajya Lakshmi Campus for her further education but dropped out from what she saw as "bourgeois education" after four years. She started studying Chinese from which she learned about communism from her teacher Mahesh Man Shrestha, a leftist intellectual and a physician. She was quite impressed by the life and contribution of Mao Tse-tung and read articles on struggles by women activists in China during the revolution.

After having observed Shakya's suspicious activities her parents decided to arrange a marriage for her. With the help of her sister Sunita and her friend Sulochana, she made a plan to quit her home and devote her life for the party. In 1980, she ran away from home to avoid the marriage. After leaving her home, she joined the CPN-ML.

== Political career ==
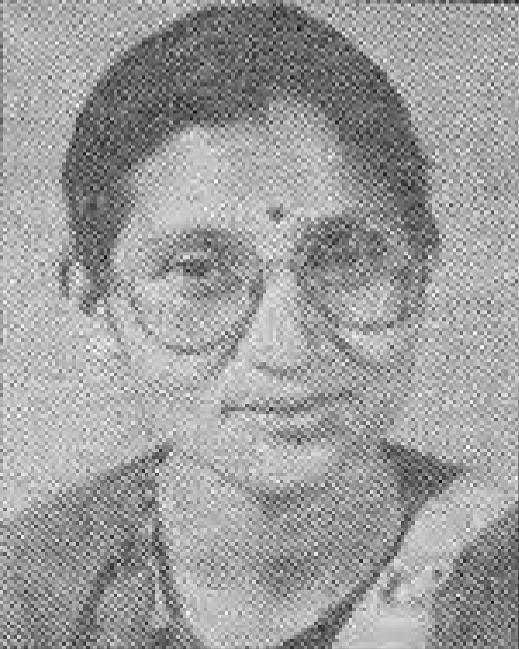
Shakya in 1992

Shakya and her colleagues in a Chinese language class formed a group of around sixty youths to continue to work to change their society through activities, such as visiting villages to teach the people about communism and publishing booklets on revolutions and communist leaders. Without having connection with any political party they worked for three years. Her profession as a teacher helped her to participate in those activities as she could tell her parents that she would go to villages for her school work.

In 1980, she left her home, pretending to go to attend a feast at her friend's house. Before that her important books and documents had already been carried out. She had collected all her photos which were with her relatives and burnt them. She donated all her belongings, including expensive jewels, to the party and took a vow to obey the party directives. At that time the party in-charge of the CPN (ML) in Bagmati Zone was Amrit Kumar Bohara who later became her life partner.

Soon after she entered into her underground life, Shakya had to face a kind of test to prove that she was not an ordinary comfort-seeking city-dweller but could struggle for others' cause. Her party assigned her to work in Piskar village of Sindhupalchowk district, located in the eastern side of the Kathmandu Valley. She worked in Piskar for two years to establish the party organization. She stayed in the community of Thamis, ethnic minorities who live in the area. While staying there she lived in a cave for three months. She taught villagers reading and writing and about public health.

Shakya spent eleven years of underground life in different places of the country before the multi-party system was restored in 1990. She had stayed in Panga of Kirtipur, in Tokha of Kathmandu as well as in Ilam and Jhapa districts in eastern Nepal. In 1984 she became a district committee member of Jhapa and in-charge of All Nepal Women Association in Mechi Zone. In 1988 she became a member of Mechi Zonal Committee.

=== Party roles ===
Shakya was given various responsibilities by her party to head Muslim Ittehad Organization, Central Law Department and Parliamentary Hearing Committee. She also played an important role to establish the women organization in her party. In February 1981 she, along with Gaura Prasai, Sushila Shrestha and others, organized a secret conference of women cadres of the CPN (ML) in Hetauda, where All Nepal Women Association was reformed to become more active. In this conference Shanta Manavi was elected as a president.

Shakya was elected as a member of House of Representatives from a constituency in Kathmandu in the 1999 Nepalese legislative election. She also became Minister of Women, Children and Social Welfare in the coalition government and Minister of Industry and Commerce.

Shakya was elected vice president of the CPN-UML party, from the general convention. She has been the SC member of JOMPOPS since its formation in early 2010 and was the first elected chairperson of the JOMPOPS platform.

Shakya was also elected as a Constituent Assembly Member in November 2014. In 2015, she turned down the nomination of Labor minister to give other politicians a chance to work at the position.

== Personal life ==
In 1981, Shakya married Amrit Kumar Bohara, who is now a member of Standing Committee of the CPN- UML. They both applied in their party for marriage and the party decided to grant them permission. She has two children, a son and a daughter. Both spent most of their childhood at her friends' houses, growing up separately in different places.
