= Anuradha Koirala =

Nepalese activist

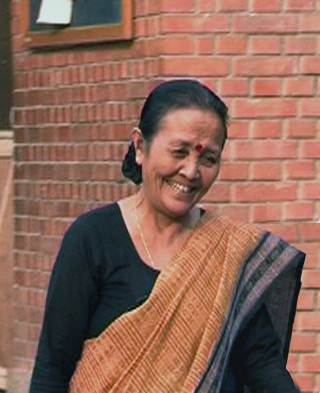
- Anuradha Koirala

1st Governor of Bagmati Province
- In office 19 January 2018 – 3 November 2019
- President: Bidhya Devi Bhandari
- Chief Minister: Dormani Poudel
- Succeeded by: Bishnu Prasad Prasain

Personal details
- Born: Anuradha Gurung; 14 April 1949 (age 77)
- Party: Nepali Congress
- Spouse: Dinesh Prasad Koirala
- Children: Manish Koirala
- Parent(s): Colonel Pratap Singh Gurung and Laxmi Devi Gurung
- Occupation: Social activist

Anuradha Koirala (born Anuradha Gurung; 14 April 1949) is a social activist and the founder of Maiti Nepal, a non-profit organization dedicated to helping victims of sex trafficking. She was appointed as 1st Governor of Bagmati Province from (17 January 2018 – 3 November 2019) by the Government of Nepal.

Koirala was the first child of the colonel Pratap Singh Gurung and Laxmi Devi Gurung. She belonged to an educated family and was educated at St. Joseph Convent School. Before she started Maiti-Nepal, she spent 20 years as a teacher, teaching English in different schools in Kathmandu.

Maiti Nepal operates a rehabilitation home in Kathmandu, as well as transit homes at the Indo-Nepal border towns, preventive homes in the countryside, and an academy in Kathmandu. Maiti Nepal ("Maiti" means "mother's home" in Nepali) has been a refuge for women rescued from the brothels in India and Nepal. The women can stay in the homes run by Maiti Nepal until they can return to their homes, or if not accepted by their parents and society, they may stay until they become able to live independently. Between 1993 and 2022, she and her organisation have helped rescue and rehabilitate more than 50,000 women and girls.

Maiti Nepal also works on reuniting the rescued women with their families, patrolling the Indo-Nepal border with police and other law enforcement authorities, and also rescuing trafficked women from brothels in India with the help of Indian authorities.

Koirala received the Courage of Conscience Award from The Peace Abbey in Sherborn, Massachusetts, on 25 August 2006. She won the CNN Hero of the Year award in 2010. She has been called the Mother Teresa of Nepal for her work.

The United States government gave a two-year grant of $500,000 (52124000. 00 in Nepali rupees) to Maiti Nepal in April 2010.

In November 2017, Koirala joined Nepali Congress party.

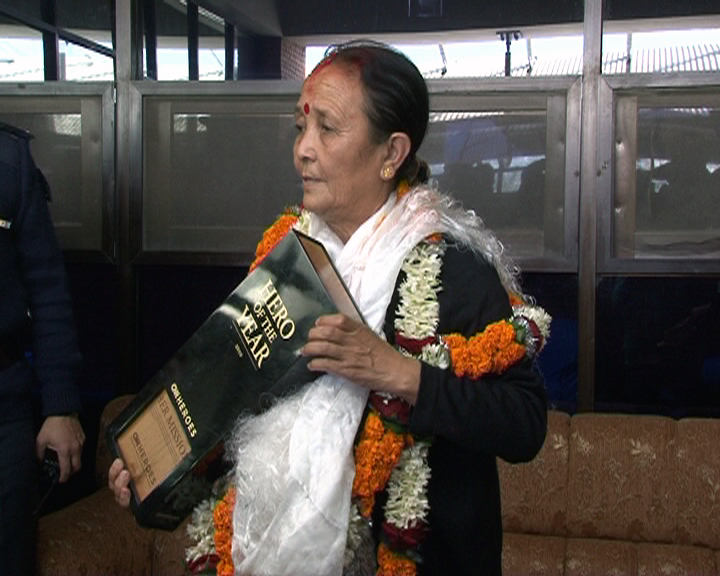
Anuradha Koirala with CNN Hero award

== Awards and recognitions ==
Koirala received the Best Social Worker of the Year Award (Nepal) in 1998, the Prabal Gorkha Dakshin Bahu Medal (Nepal) in 1999, the Trishaktipatta Award in 2002, the Courage of Conscience Award from The Peace Abbey Foundation in 2006, German UNIFEM Prize in 2007 and Queen Sofia Silver Medal Award in 2007.

In 2010, she was presented with the CNN Heroes award; Demi Moore and Ashton Kutcher presented the award at a ceremony in Los Angeles, California. She received USD 100,000 to continue her work with Maiti Nepal, in addition to USD 25,000 from CNN.

She received the Mother Teresa Award in 2014.

In 2014, Koirala was awarded the Acharya Tulsi Kartitva Puraskar by the Akhil Bhartiya Terapanth Mahila Mandal (ABTMM).

Koirala was conferred India's fourth highest civilian award Padma Shri in April 2017 by president Pranab Mukherjee. In 2018 Koirala received the G.O.D. Award.

== See also ==
- Social worker
- People of Nepal
- Pushpa Basnet
- Godawari vidhya Mandir
- Rangu Souriya
- Prof. Dr. Govinda Bahadur Tumbahang
- Ratneshwar Lal Kayastha
- Baburam Kunwar
- Durga Keshar Khanal
- Mohan Raj Malla
