= Rajendra Prasad Pandey =

Nepali politician

Honourable Rajendra Prasad Pandey
- राजेन्द्र प्रसाद पाण्डे
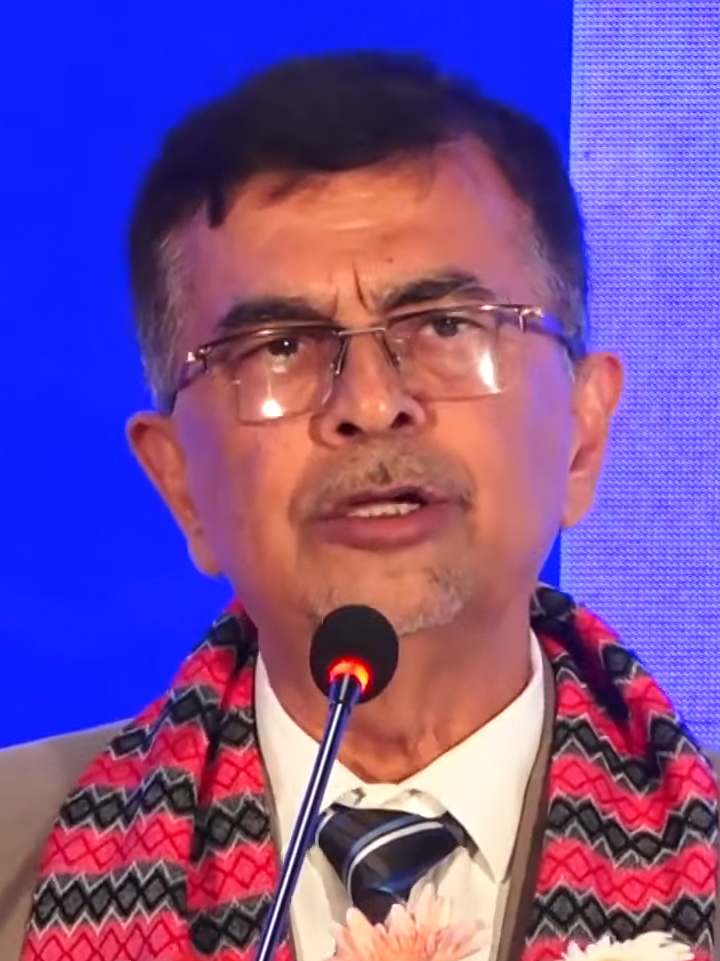

3rd Chief Minister of Bagmati Province
- In office 27 October 2021 – 23 December 2022
- Governor: Yadav Chandra Sharma
- Preceded by: Asta Laxmi Shakya

Deputy Chairman of CPN (Unified Socialist)
- Incumbent
- Assumed office 23 September 2021
- Preceded by: Position created

Member of Parliament, Pratinidhi Sabha
- In office 2023 – 12 September 2025
- Preceded by: Bhumi Tripathi
- Constituency: Dhading 1

Member of Bagmati Provincial Assembly
- In office 1 February 2018 – 2022
- Preceded by: Constituency established
- Succeeded by: Madu Kumar Shrestha
- Constituency: Dhading 1(A)

Member of 2nd Constituent Assembly
- In office 21 January 2014 – 14 October 2018
- President: Bidya Devi Bhandari
- Prime Minister: Sher Bahadur Deuba
- Constituency: Dhading 3

Personal details
- Born: 11 June 1956 (age 69) Gajuri, Dhading, Nepal
- Party: CPN (Unified Socialist)
- Education: Masters in Rural Development

Rajendra Prasad Pandey is a Nepalese politician, belonging to the CPN (Unified Socialist) who served as the Chief minister of Bagmati Province. He's also the deputy chairman of the CPN (Unified Socialist).

He became chief minister of the province with support of Nepali Congress, the ruling party of Nepal. In the 2017 Nepalese provincial election he was elected from the Dhading 1(A).

== Electoral history ==
=== 2017 Nepalese provincial elections ===
Dhading-1(A)
Party	Candidate	Votes
CPN (Unified Marxist–Leninist)	Rajendra Prasad Pandey	27,332
Nepali Congress	Madu Kumar Shreshtha	13,647
Others		891
Invalid votes		1,615
Result	CPN UML) gain	
Source: Election Commission

== See also ==
- CPN (Unified Socialist)

Political offices
Preceded by Astalaxmi Shakya	Chief Minister of Bagmati Province; 2021-	Succeeded by incumbent
