= Bishnu Prasad Prasain =

Nepalese politician

- विष्णु प्रसाद प्रसाई

2nd Governor of Bagmati Province
- In office 4 November 2019 – 20 August 2021
- President: Bidhya Devi Bhandari
- Chief Minister: Dormani Poudel; Astalaxmi Shakya
- Preceded by: Anuradha Koirala
- Succeeded by: Yadav Chandra Sharma

Personal details
- Born: Mechinagar, Nepal
- Citizenship: Nepali
- Party: Communist Party of Nepal (Unified Marxist–Leninist) (?- 2019)
- Spouse: Lata Prasain

Bishnu Prasad Prasain (Nepali: विष्णु प्रसाद प्रसाई) is a Former Governor of Bagmati Province. He was Appointed as the Governor, as per the Article 163 (2) of the Constitution of Nepal, by the President Bidya Devi Bhandari on the recommendation of the Council of Ministers of the Government of Nepal on 4 November 2019. In 2051 BS, he was the Executive Chairman of the Nepal Tea Development Board and in 2054 BS, He served as the Deputy Chairman of the District Development Committee of Jhapa District. In 2056 BS. He was a CPN UML candidate for House of Representatives from Jhapa 3 (constituency) but he lost the election and In 2017 Nepalese local elections. He was again CPN UML candidate for the post of Mayor of Mechinagar Municipality but lost the election.

== See also ==
- Bagmati Province
- Governor (Nepal)
