= Yadav Chandra Sharma =

Nepalese politician

Honourable Yadav Chandra Sharma
- यादवचन्द्र शर्मा

3rd Governor of Bagmati Province
- In office 20 August 2021 – 31 July 2024
- President: Ram Chandra Poudel
- Chief Minister: Astalaxmi Shakya; Rajendra Prasad Pandey; Shalikram Jamkattel; Bahadur Singh Lama
- Preceded by: Bishnu Prasad Prasain
- Succeeded by: Deepak Prasad Devkota

Personal details
- Citizenship: Nepali
- Party: CPN (until-2021)

Yadav Chandra Sharma (Nepali: यादवचन्द्र शर्मा) is a Nepalese politician and former Governor of Bagmati Province, Nepal. He was appointed as the governor per Article 163 (2) of the Constitution of Nepal by the president Bidya Devi Bhandari on the recommendation of the Council of Ministers of the Government of Nepal on 20 August 2021. He was the personal secretary of Madhav Kumar Nepal when Nepal was Prime Minister.

== See also ==
- Bagmati Province
- Governor (Nepal)
