= Dormani Poudel =

Nepalese politician

- डोरमणि पौडेल
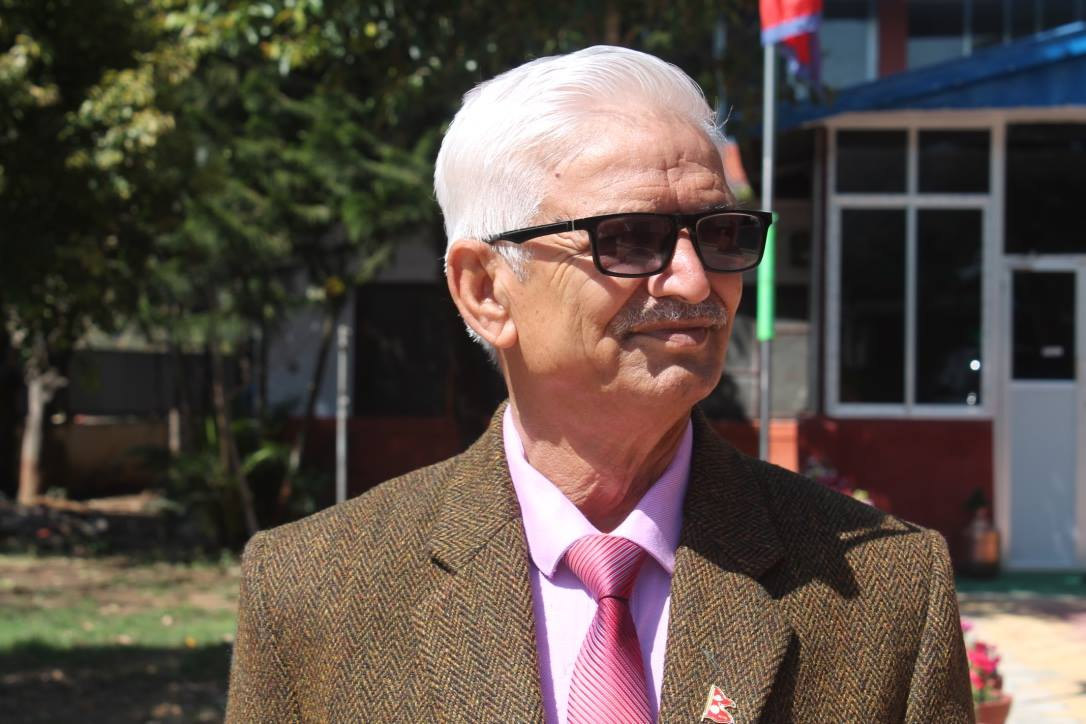

1st Chief Minister of Bagmati Province
- In office 12 February 2018 – 18 August 2021
- Governor: Anuradha Koirala; Bishnu Prasad Prasain
- Preceded by: Office established
- Succeeded by: Astalaxmi Shakya

Member of Provincial Assembly of Bagmati Province
- In office 21 January 2018 – 2022
- Preceded by: Constituency established
- Succeeded by: Ek Lal Shrestha
- Constituency: Makwanpur 1(B)

3rd Mayor of Hetauda
- In office 1992–2005
- Deputy: Hari Bahadur Mahat
- Preceded by: Omnath Parajuli
- Succeeded by: Hari Bahadur Mahat

Personal details
- Born: March 28, 1946 (age 80) Pharping, Nepal
- Party: Communist Party of Nepal (Unified Marxist–Leninist)

Dormani Poudel (Nepali: डोरमणि पौडेल) is a Nepali politician and former chief minister of Bagmati Province. He was in office from 12 February 2018 to 18 August 2021. Poudel was elected parliamentary party leader of the CPN (UML), the largest party in the provincial assembly, on 9 February 2018, receiving 34 votes among 58 provincial assembly members. He was subsequently appointed the first chief minister of Bagmati Province on 12 February 2018, after taking the oath of office from province governor Anuradha Koirala. He previously served as the mayor of Hetauda from 1992 to 2005.(by Aashish Bhandari)

== Early life ==
Poudel was born in Pharping, Kathmandu to Mayanath Poudel and Kul Kumari Poudel. Later, his family moved to Hetauda, Makwanpur.
