= 3rd House of Representatives (Nepal) =

List of MPs elected

←	2nd HoR	4th HoR	→
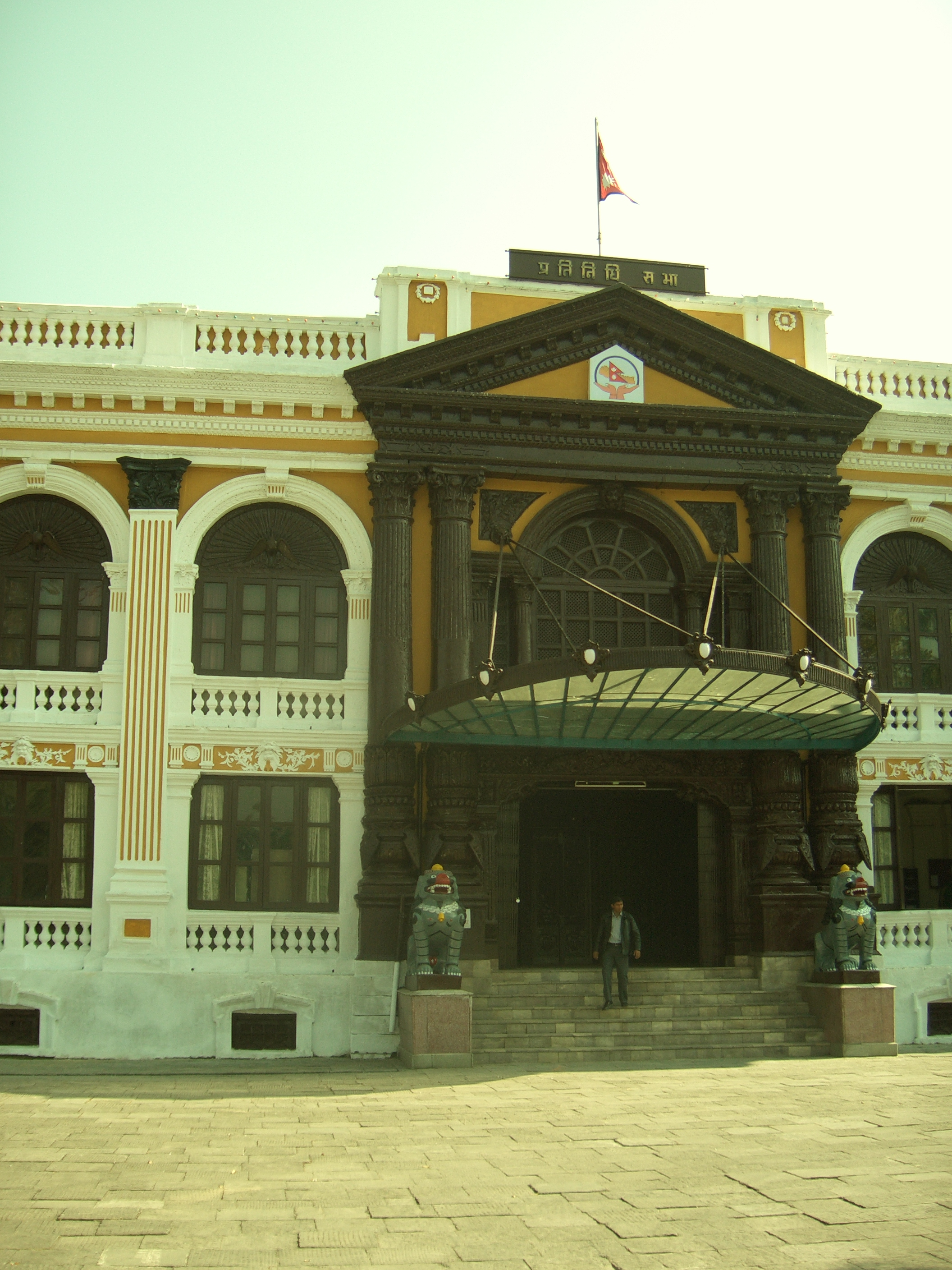
- Gallery Baithak

Overview
- Legislative body: Parliament of the Kingdom of Nepal
- Jurisdiction: Kingdom of Nepal
- Meeting place: Gallery Baithak
- Term: October 1994 – May 1999
- Election: 1994 general election
- Government: Adhikari cabinet First Deuba cabinet Third Chand cabinet Fourth Thapa cabinet Second Girija Prasad Koirala cabinet Third Girija Prasad Koirala cabinet

House of Representatives
- Members: 205
- Speaker: Ram Chandra Paudel (NC)
- Deputy Speaker: Ram Vilas Yadav (RPP)
- Prime Minister: Man Mohan Adhikari (UML); Sher Bahadur Deuba (NC); Lokendra Bahadur Chand (RPP-C); Surya Bahadur Thapa (RPP); Girija Prasad Koirala (NC)

The 3rd House of Representatives was elected at the 1994 Nepalese general election. All 205 members were elected from constituencies using the first-past-the-post system.

The list of elected members is arranged by constituency. Ram Chandra Paudel served as the Speaker. There were five prime ministers before the parliament was dissolved in 1999. Man Mohan Adhikari, Sher Bahadur Deuba, Lokendra Bahadur Chand, Surya Bahadur Thapa and Girija Prasad Koirala served as prime ministers in different periods during the term of the parliament.

== House composition ==
3rd House of Representatives

Parliament at start of term

Parliament after independent defections and 1997 By Election

By the end of term

Party	Members	
Party	After election	At dissolution
Nepali Congress	83	88
CPN (UML)	88	49
CPN (Marxist–Leninist)	—	40
Rastriya Prajatantra Party	20	11
RPP (Chand)	—	8
Nepal Sadbhawana Party	3	3
Nepal Workers Peasants Party	4	2
Rastriya Janamorcha	—	2
Independent	7	0
Vacant	—	2
Total	205	205

== Leaders ==
- Speaker of the House:
  - Rt. Hon. Ram Chandra Paudel (Nepali Congress)
- Deputy Speaker of the House:
  - Hon. Ram Vilas Yadav (Rastriya Prajatantra Party) (until 1996)
  - Hon. Lila Shrestha Subba (CPN (UML)) (from 1996)
- Prime Minister of Nepal:
  - Hon. Man Mohan Adhikari (CPN (UML)) (until 12 September 1995)
  - Hon. Sher Bahadur Deuba (Nepali Congress) (12 September 1995 – 12 March 1997)
  - Hon. Lokendra Bahadur Chand (Rastriya Prajatantra Party) (12 March 1997 – 7 October 1997)
  - Hon. Surya Bahadur Thapa (Rastriya Prajatantra Party) (7 October 1997 –15 April 1998)
  - Hon. Girija Prasad Koirala (Nepali Congress) (15 April 1998 – 31 May 1999)
- Leader of the Opposition:
  - Hon. Sher Bahadur Deuba (Nepali Congress)
  - Hon. Girija Prasad Koirala (Nepali Congress)
  - Hon. Man Mohan Adhikari (CPN (Unified Marxist–Leninist))
  - Hon. Girija Prasad Koirala (Nepali Congress)
  - Hon. Bam Dev Gautam (CPN (Marxist–Leninist))

=== Parliamentary party leaders ===
- Parliamentary party leader of Nepali Congress:
  - Hon. Sher Bahadur Deuba
  - Hon. Girija Prasad Koirala
- Parliamentary party leader of CPN (Unified Marxist–Leninist): Hon. Man Mohan Adhikari
- Parliamentary party leader of CPN (Marxist–Leninist): Hon. Bam Dev Gautam
- Parliamentary party leader of Rastriya Prajatantra Party: Hon. Surya Bahadur Thapa
- Parliamentary party leader of Rastriya Prajatantra Party (Chand): Hon. Lokendra Bahadur Chand

=== Whips ===
- Chief Whip of Nepali Congress
  - Hon. Chiranjibi Wagle
  - Hon. Ananda Prasad Dhungana
  - Hon. Shiva Raj Joshi
  - Whip of Nepali Congress
    - Hon. Padma Narayan Chaudhary
    - Hon. Gangadhar Lamsal
    - Hon. Devendra Raj Kandel
- Chief Whip of CPN (Unified Marxist–Leninist)
  - Hon. Devi Prasad Ojha
  - Hon. Rajendra Prasad Pandey
  - Whip of CPN (Unified Marxist–Leninist)
    - Hon. Rajendra Prasad Pandey
    - Hon. Khagaraj Adhikari
- Chief Whip of CPN (Marxist–Leninist)
  - Hon. Tanka Rai
  - Whip of CPN (Marxist–Leninist)
    - Hon. Ganga Prasad Chaudhary

== Members of the House ==
Constituency	Winner	Party
Taplejung 1	Mani Lama	Nepali Congress
Taplejung 2	Ambika Sawa	CPN (Marxist–Leninist)
Panchthar 1	Dipak Prakash Baskota	Nepali Congress
Panchthar 2	Padma Sundar Lawati	RPP (Chand)
Ilam 1	Jhala Nath Khanal	CPN (UML)
Ilam 2	Kul Bahadur Gurung	Nepali Congress
Ilam 3	Padam Bhandari	CPN (UML)
Jhapa 1	Pushpa Raj Pokharel	CPN (Marxist–Leninist)
Jhapa 2	Chandra Prakash Mainali	CPN (Marxist–Leninist)
Jhapa 3	Devi Prasad Ojha	CPN (Marxist–Leninist)
Jhapa 4	Chakra Prasad Bastola	Nepali Congress
Jhapa 5	Radha Krishna Mainali	CPN (Marxist–Leninist)
Jhapa 6	K. P. Sharma Oli	CPN (UML)
Sankhuwasabha 1	Dedh Raj Khadka	CPN (UML)
Sankhuwasabha 2	Hari Bairagi Dahal	CPN (UML)
Tehrathum 1	Surendra Kumar Phambo	CPN (UML)
Bhojpur 1	Hemraj Rai	CPN (Marxist–Leninist)
Bhojpur 2	Dhan Harka Rai	CPN (Marxist–Leninist)
Dhankuta 1	Rakam Chemjong	CPN (Marxist–Leninist)
Dhankuta 2	Surya Bahadur Thapa	Rastriya Prajatantra Party
Morang 1	Girija Prasad Koirala	Nepali Congress
Morang 2	Bharat Mohan Adhikari	CPN (UML)
Morang 3	Badri Narayan Basnet	Nepali Congress
Morang 4	Harka Man Tamang	CPN (UML)
Morang 5	Kamal Prasad Koirala	CPN (Marxist–Leninist)
Morang 6	Guru Prasad Baral	CPN (UML)
Morang 7	Shailaja Acharya	Nepali Congress
Sunsari 1	Lila Shrestha Subba	CPN (UML)
Sunsari 2	Bijay Kumar Gachhadar	Nepali Congress
Sunsari 3	Laxman Prasad Mehta	Nepali Congress
Sunsari 4	Hari Nath Bastola	Nepali Congress
Sunsari 5	Jagadish Prasad Kusiyat	CPN (UML)
Solukhumbu 1	Bal Bahadur K.C.	Nepali Congress
Khotang 1	Tanka Rai	CPN (Marxist–Leninist)
Khotang 2	Ashok Kumar Rai	CPN (Marxist–Leninist)
Okhaldhunga 1	Chandra Kanta Dahal	Nepali Congress
Okhaldhunga 1	Bal Bahadur Rai	Nepali Congress
Udayapur 1	Laxmi Narayan Chaudhary	CPN (Marxist–Leninist)
Udayapur 2	Bishnu Bahadur Raut	CPN (UML)
Saptari 1	Jay Prakash Gupta	Nepali Congress
Saptari 2	Gajendra Narayan Singh	Nepal Sadbhawana Party
Saptari 3	Anish Ansari	Nepal Sadbhawana Party
Saptari 4	Dan Lal Chaudhary	CPN (UML)
Saptari 5	Ganga Prasad Chaudhary	CPN (Marxist–Leninist)
Siraha 1	Padma Narayan Chaudhary	Nepali Congress
Siraha 2	Narendra Raj Pokharel	CPN (UML)
Siraha 3	Suresh Chandra Das	Nepali Congress
Siraha 4	Raj Dev Gohit	Nepali Congress
Siraha 5	Pradip Giri	Nepali Congress
Dolakha 1	Bhim Bahadur Tamang	Nepali Congress
Dolakha 2	Wangche Sherpa	CPN (UML)
Ramechhap 1	Dev Shankar Paudel	CPN (UML)
Ramechhap 2	Padhma Shankar Adhikari	Nepali Congress
Sindhuli 1	Bipin Koirala	Nepali Congress
Sindhuli 2	Hem Raj Dahal	Nepali Congress
Sindhuli 3	Dhruba Prakash Sharma	Nepali Congress
Dhanusha 1	Ram Chandra Jha	CPN (UML)
Dhanusha 2	Lila Koirala	Nepali Congress
Dhanusha 3	Ananda Prasad Dhungana	Nepali Congress
Dhanusha 4	Bimalendra Nidhi	Nepali Congress
Dhanusha 5	Ram Lakhan Mahato	CPN (UML)
Mahottari 1	Mahendra Yadav	Nepali Congress
Mahottari 2	Mahendra Raya	RPP (Chand)
Mahottari 3	Ram Vilas Yadav	Rastriya Prajatantra Party
Mahottari 4	Sharat Singh Bhandari	Nepali Congress
Sarlahi 1	Mahindra Ray Yadav	CPN (UML)
Sarlahi 2	Mina Pandey	Nepali Congress
Sarlahi 3	Ram Hari Joshi	Nepali Congress
Sarlahi 4	Khobari Raya Yadav	RPP (Chand)
Sarlahi 5	Mahantha Thakur	Nepali Congress
Rasuwa 1	Ram Krishna Udpadhyaya	RPP (Chand)
Dhading 1	Budhhiman Tamang	Rastriya Prajatantra Party
Dhading 2	Ganga Lal Tuladhar	CPN (UML)
Dhading 3	Rajendra Prasad Pandey	CPN (UML)
Nuwakot 1	Prakash Chandra Lohani	Rastriya Prajatantra Party
Nuwakot 2	Ram Saran Mahat	Nepali Congress
Nuwakot 3	Arjun Narasingha K.C.	Nepali Congress
Kathmandu 1	Narayan Prasad Dhakal	CPN (UML)
Kathmandu 2	Bidhya Devi Bhandari	CPN (UML)
Kathmandu 3	Man Mohan Adhikari	CPN (UML)
Kathmandu 4	Padma Ratna Tuladhar	CPN (Marxist–Leninist)
Kathmandu 5	Rajendra Prasad Shrestha	CPN (Marxist–Leninist)
Kathmandu 6	Sahana Pradhan	CPN (Marxist–Leninist)
Kathmandu 7	Krishna Gopal Shrestha	CPN (UML)
Bhaktapur 1	Narayan Man Bijukchhe	Nepal Workers Peasants Party
Bhaktapur 2	Asha Kaji Basukala	Nepal Workers Peasants Party
Lalitpur 1	Mitha Ram Sharma	CPN (UML)
Lalitpur 2	Siddhi Lal Singh	CPN (Marxist–Leninist)
Lalitpur 3	Raghuji Pant	CPN (UML)
Kavrepalanchok 1	Shiva Kumar Deuja	CPN (UML)
Kavrepalanchok 2	Keshab Prasad Badal	CPN (UML)
Kavrepalanchok 3	Govinda Nath Upreti	CPN (Marxist–Leninist)
Sindhupalchok 1	Amrit Kumar Bohara	CPN (UML)
Sindhupalchok 2	Bishnu Bikram Thapa	Rastriya Prajatantra Party
Sindhupalchok 3	Pashupati S.J.B. Rana	Rastriya Prajatantra Party
Makwanpur 1	Kamal Thapa	Rastriya Prajatantra Party
Makwanpur 2	Birodh Khatiwada	CPN (UML)
Makwanpur 3	Hiranya Lal Shrestha	CPN (UML)
Rautahat 1	Bajra Kishor Singh	Nepali Congress
Rautahat 2	Mohammad Aftab Alam	Nepali Congress
Rautahat 3	Harihar Prasad Yadav	Nepali Congress
Rautahat 4	Uddhav Dhakal	Nepali Congress
Bara 1	Mukunda Neupane	CPN (UML)
Bara 2	Radhe Chandra Yadav	Nepali Congress
Bara 3	Purusottam Poudel	CPN (UML)
Bara 4	Salim Miya Ansari	CPN (Marxist–Leninist)
Parsa 1	Rajiv Parajuli	Rastriya Prajatantra Party
Parsa 2	Ram Chandra Prasad Kushwaha	Nepali Congress
Parsa 3	Surendra Prasad Chaudhary	Nepali Congress
Parsa 4	Ramesh Rijal	Nepali Congress
Chitwan 1	Jagrit Prasad Bhetwal	CPN (UML)
Chitwan 2	Kashi Nath Adhikari	CPN (UML)
Chitwan 3	Gangadhar Lamsal	Nepali Congress
Chitwan 4	Tirtha Bhusal	Nepali Congress
Gorkha 1	Chiranjibi Wagle	Nepali Congress
Gorkha 2	Kamala Devi Panta	Nepali Congress
Gorkha 3	Chin Kaji Shrestha	Nepali Congress
Manang 1	Palten Gurung	Nepali Congress
Lamjung 1	Ram Chandra Adhikari	Nepali Congress
Lamjung 2	Ram Bahadur Gurung	Nepali Congress
Kaski 1	Khagaraj Adhikari	CPN (UML)
Kaski 2	Tula Bahadur Gurung	CPN (UML)
Kaski 3	Krishna Bahadur Gurung	Nepali Congress
Tanahu 1	Govinda Raj Joshi	Nepali Congress
Tanahu 2	Ram Chandra Poudel	Nepali Congress
Tanahu 3	Amar Raj Kaini	Nepali Congress
Syangja 1	Trilochan Sharma Dhakal	CPN (Marxist–Leninist)
Syangja 2	Dhruba Raj Lamsal	CPN (UML)
Syangja 3	Mahendra Thapa	CPN (Marxist–Leninist)
Gulmi 1	Ramnath Dhakal	CPN (UML)
Gulmi 2	Kamal Raj Shrestha	CPN (UML)
Gulmi 3	Tanka Prasad Pokharel	CPN (Marxist–Leninist)
Palpa 1	Dal Bahadur Rana Magar	CPN (Marxist–Leninist)
Palpa 2	Som Prasad Pandey	CPN (UML)
Palpa 3	Bishnu Prasad Paudel	CPN (UML)
Arghakhanchi 1	Rewati Prasad Bhusal	Nepali Congress
Arghakhanchi 2	Dhundhi Raj Sharma	Nepali Congress
Nawalparasi 1	Mahendra Dhoj G.C.	Nepali Congress
Nawalparasi 2	Majhi Lal Tharu Thanet	CPN (UML)
Nawalparasi 3	Hridayesh Tripathi	Nepal Sadbhawana Party
Nawalparasi 4	Devendra Raj Kandel	Nepali Congress
Rupandehi 1	Duryodhan Singh	Nepali Congress
Rupandehi 2	Ghanashyam Bhusal	CPN (Marxist–Leninist)
Rupandehi 3	Modanath Prasrit	CPN (UML)
Rupandehi 4	Jyotendra Mohan Chaudhary	RPP (Chand)
Rupandehi 5	Sarbendra Nath Shukla	Rastriya Prajatantra Party
Kapilvastu 1	Kamlesh Kumar Sharma	Nepali Congress
Kapilvastu 2	Dip Kumar Upadhaya	Nepali Congress
Kapilvastu 3	Bishnu Raj Acharya	Nepali Congress
Mustang 1	Sushil Man Sherchan	Nepali Congress
Myagdi 1	Nil Bahadur Tilija	CPN (Marxist–Leninist)
Baglung 1	Govinda Adhikari	CPN (UML)
Baglung 2	Min Bahadur Khatri	Nepali Congress
Baglung 3	Pari Thapa	Rastriya Janamorcha
Parbat 1	Indu Sharma Paudel	Nepali Congress
Parbat 2	Dev Bahadur Paudel Chhettri	CPN (Marxist–Leninist)
Rukum 1	Krishna Prasad Gautam	Nepali Congress
Rukum 2	Gopalji Jang Shahi	Nepali Congress
Rolpa 1	Balaram Gharti Magar	Rastriya Prajatantra Party
Rolpa 2	Surendra Hamal	Nepali Congress
Pyuthan 1	Shiva Raj Subedi	Nepali Congress
Pyuthan 2	Nava Raj Subedi	Rastriya Janamorcha
Salyan 1	Rajendra Bahadur Shah	Nepali Congress
Salyan 2	Chhabi Prasad Devkota	Nepali Congress
Dang Deukhuri 1	Hari Prasad Chaudhary	Nepali Congress
Dang Deukhuri 2	Bal Dev Sharma	Nepali Congress
Dang Deukhuri 3	Shankar Pokharel	CPN (UML)
Dang Deukhuri 4	Khum Bahadur Khadka	Nepali Congress
Dolpa 1	Moti Prasad Pahadi	Nepali Congress
Mugu 1	Hasta Bahadur Malla	Nepali Congress
Jumla 1	Bhakta Bahadur Rokaya	Nepali Congress
Kalikot 1	Yagya Raj Neupane	CPN (Marxist–Leninist)
Humla 1	Chakra Bahadur Shahi	Nepali Congress
Jajarkot 1	Jhalak Nath Wagle	Nepali Congress
Jajarkot 2	Dipak Jung Shah	Nepali Congress
Dailekh 1	Ganesh Bahadur Khadka	Nepali Congress
Dailekh 2	Binod Kumar Shah	CPN (UML)
Surkhet 1	Purna Bahadur Khadka	Nepali Congress
Surkhet 2	Yam Lal Kandel	CPN (Marxist–Leninist)
Surkhet 3	Shiv Raj Joshi	Nepali Congress
Banke 1	Prem Bahadur Bhandari	RPP (Chand)
Banke 2	Shanti SJB Rana	Rastriya Prajatantra Party
Banke 3	Fateh Singh Tharu	RPP (Chand)
Bardiya 1	Bam Dev Gautam	CPN (Marxist–Leninist)
Bardiya 2	Shyam Dhakal	CPN (UML)
Bardiya 3	Kashi Ram Tharu	CPN (UML)
Bajura 1	Hikmat Bahadur Shahi	CPN (Marxist–Leninist)
Bajhang 1	Bhanu Bhakta Joshi	CPN (UML)
Bajhang 2	Naresh Bahadur Singh	Nepali Congress
Achham 1	Bhim Bahadur Rawal	CPN (UML)
Achham 2	Bhim Bahadur Kathayat	CPN (UML)
Doti 1	Bhakta Bahadur Balayar	Nepali Congress
Doti 2	Siddha Raj Ojha	Nepali Congress
Kailali 1	Himanchal Raj Bhattarai	CPN (UML)
Kailali 2	Ram Janam Chaudhary	Nepali Congress
Kailali 3	Chandra Chaudhary	CPN (UML)
Kailali 4	Maheshwar Pathak	CPN (Marxist–Leninist)
Dadeldhura 1	Sher Bahadur Deuba	Nepali Congress
Baitadi 1	Keshav Bahadur Chand	Nepali Congress
Baitadi 2	Lokendra Bahadur Chand	RPP (Chand)
Kanchanpur 1	Ram Kumar Gyawali	CPN (UML)
Kanchanpur 2	Bhojraj Joshi	CPN (Marxist–Leninist)
Kanchanpur 3	Urbadutta Pant	CPN (UML)

== By-elections ==
Constituency	Incumbent	Party	Cause of vacation	Elected MP	Party	By-election
Sunsari 5	Girija Prasad Koirala	Congress	Elected from Morang 1	Jagadish Prasad Kusiyat	CPN (UML)	1997
Kathmandu 1	Man Mohan Adhikari	CPN (UML)	Elected from Kathmandu 3	Narayan Prasad Dhakal	CPN (UML)	1997
Baitadi 1	Lokendra Bahadur Chand	RPP	Elected from Baitadi 2	Keshav Bahadur Chand	Congress	1997
Rautahat 2	Sheikh Idrish	Congress	Death	Mohammad Aftab Alam	Congress	1997
Rupandehi 2	Dhanpati Upadhyaya	CPN (UML)	Death	Ghanashyam Bhusal	CPN (UML)	1997
Darchula 1	Prem Singh Dhami	CPN (UML)	Death			
Kapilvastu 4	Mirza Dilshad Beg	RPP (Chand)	Death			

== Defections ==
Constituency	Name	From	To	Date	Reference
Mahottari 4	Sharat Singh Bhandari	Independent	Congress	7 November 1995	
Bajhang 2	Naresh Bahadur Singh	Independent	Congress	7 November 1995	
Manang 1	Palten Gurung	Independent	Congress	7 November 1995	
Jumla 1	Bhakta Bahadur Rokaya	NMKP	Congress	2 October 1997	
Dolpa 1	Moti Prasad Pahadi	Independent	Congress	2 October 1997	
Dailekh 2	Binod Kumar Shah	NMKP	CPN (UML)		
Rupandehi 4	Jyotendra Mohan Chaudhary	Independent	RPP		
Pyuthan 2	Nava Raj Subedi	Independent	Janamorcha		
Baglung 3	Pari Thapa	Independent	Janamorcha		
Panchthar 2	Padma Sundar Lawati	RPP	RPP (Chand)	20 January 1998	
Mahottari 2	Mahendra Raya	RPP	RPP (Chand)	20 January 1998	
Sarlahi 4	Khobari Raya Yadav	RPP	RPP (Chand)	20 January 1998	
Rasuwa 1	Ram Krishna Udpadhyaya	RPP	RPP (Chand)	20 January 1998	
Rupandehi 4	Jyotendra Mohan Chaudhary	RPP	RPP (Chand)	20 January 1998	
Banke 1	Prem Bahadur Bhandari	RPP	RPP (Chand)	20 January 1998	
Banke 3	Fateh Singh Tharu	RPP	RPP (Chand)	20 January 1998	
Baitadi 2	Lokendra Bahadur Chand	RPP	RPP (Chand)	20 January 1998	
