= Dailekh 2 =

Parliamentary constituency in Nepal

- Parliamentary constituency for the House of Representatives
- Dailekh 2 in Karnali Province

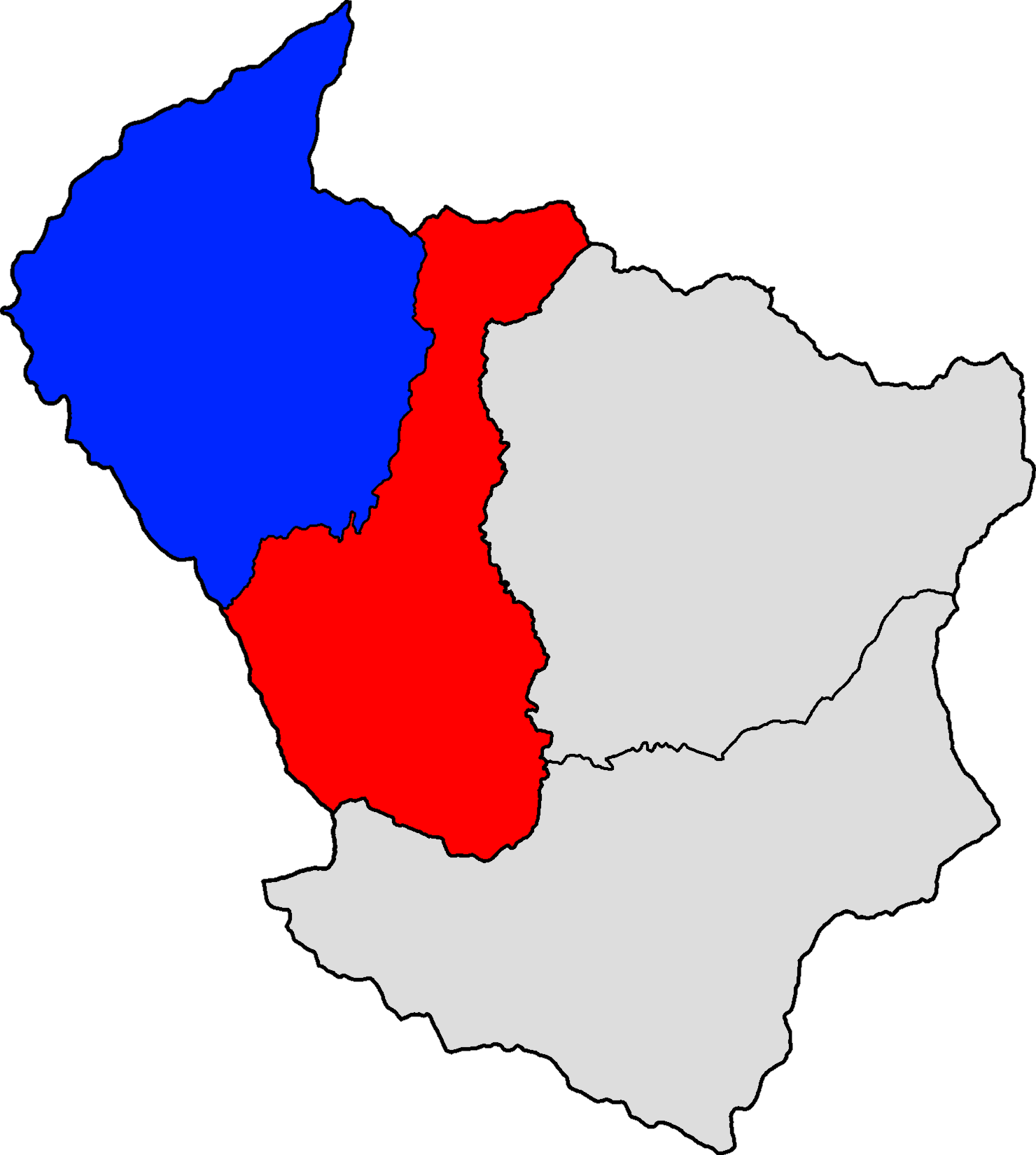
- Assembly segments Dailekh 2(A) (red) and Surkhet 2(B) (blue) within Dailekh District
- Province: Karnali Province
- District: Dailekh District
- Electorate: 69,745

Current constituency
- Created: 1991
- Number of members: 3
- Member of Parliament: Dikpal Kumar Shahi, Congress
- Karnali MPA 2(A): Ghanashyam Bhandari, Congress
- Karnali MPA 2(B): Binod Kumar Shah, UML

Dailekh 2 is one of two parliamentary constituencies of Dailekh District in Nepal. This constituency came into existence on the Constituency Delimitation Commission (CDC) report submitted on 31 August 2017.

== Incorporated areas ==
Dailekh 2 incorporates Dullu Municipality, Bhairabi Rural Municipality, Chamunda Bindrasaini Municipality, Thantikandh Rural Municipality and Aathabis Municipality.

== Assembly segments ==
It encompasses the following Karnali Provincial Assembly segment

- Dailekh 2(A)
- Dailekh 2(B)

== Members of Parliament ==
=== Parliament/Constituent Assembly ===
Election	Member	Party
1991	Rang Bahadur Shahi	Nepali Congress
1994	Binod Kumar Shah	Nepal Workers Peasants Party
1995	Binod Kumar Shah	CPN (UML)
1999	Shiv Raj Joshi	Nepali Congress
2008	Raj Bahadur Budha	CPN (UML)
2013	Laxmi Prasad Pokhrel	CPN (UML)
2017	Raj Bahadur Budha	CPN (UML)
May 2018	Raj Bahadur Budha	Nepal Communist Party
March 2021	Raj Bahadur Budha	CPN (UML)
2022	Dikpal Kumar Shahi	Nepali Congress

=== Provincial Assembly ===
==== 2(A) ====
Election	Member	Party
2017	Sushil Kumar Thapa	CPN (UML)
May 2018	Sushil Kumar Thapa	Nepal Communist Party
March 2021	Sushil Kumar Thapa	CPN (UML)
2022	Ghanashyam Bhandari	Nepali Congress

==== 2(B) ====
Election	Member	Party
2017	Raj Bahadur Shahi	CPN (UML)
May 2018	Raj Bahadur Shahi	Nepal Communist Party
March 2021	Raj Bahadur Shahi	CPN (UML)
2022	Binod Kumar Shah	CPN (UML)

== Election results ==
=== Election in the 2020s ===
==== 2022 general election ====
Candidate	Party	Votes	%
Dikpal Kumar Shahi	Nepali Congress	20,183	45.37
Laxmi Prasad Pokharel	CPN (UML)	20,016	44.99
Kesendra Prakash Karki	Nepal Workers Peasants Party	3,086	6.94
Others		1,201	2.70
Total		44,486	100.00
Majority		167	
Nepali Congress gain			

==== 2022 provincial election ====
===== 2(A) =====
Candidate	Party	Votes	%
Ghanashyam Bhandari	Nepali Congress	10,822	49.47
Tilak Prasad Rijal	CPN (UML)	9,503	43.44
Others		1,550	7.09
Total		21,875	100.00
Majority		1,319	
Nepali Congress gain			

===== 2(B) =====
Candidate	Party	Votes	%
Binod Kumar Shah	CPN (UML)	9,480	41.21
Yogendra Bahadur Shahi	CPN (Maoist Centre)	9,397	40.85
Jay Bahadur Thapa	Nepal Workers Peasants Party	3,209	13.95
Gyanendra Bahadur Shahi	Rastriya Prajatantra Party	919	3.99
Total		23,005	100.00
Majority		83	
CPN (UML) hold			

=== Election in the 2010s ===
==== 2017 general election ====
Candidate	Party	Votes	%
Raj Bahadur Budha	CPN (UML)	23,323	53.30
Shiv Raj Joshi	Nepali Congress	16,634	38.01
Jagya Bahadur Shahi	Nepal Workers Peasants Party	2,347	5.36
Others		1,455	3.33
Total		43,759	100.00
Valid votes		43,759	94.11
Invalid/blank votes		2,738	5.89
Total votes		46,497	100.00
Registered voters/turnout		69,754	66.66
Majority		6,689	
CPN (UML) hold			
Source: Election Commission

==== 2017 provincial election ====
===== 2(A) =====
Candidate	Party	Votes	%
Sushil Kumar Thapa	CPN (UML)	11,819	55.29
Madhur Bikram Khanal	Nepali Congress	8,795	41.14
Others		763	3.57
Total		21,377	100.00
Valid votes		21,377	94.81
Invalid/blank votes		1,171	5.19
Total votes		22,548	100.00
Registered voters/turnout		33,603	67.10
Majority		3,024	
CPN (UML) gain			
Source: Election Commission

===== 2(B) =====
Candidate	Party	Votes	%
Raj Bahadur Shahi	CPN (UML)	11,445	50.04
Dikpal Kumar Shahi	Nepali Congress	8,469	37.03
Lal Bahadur Kathayat	Nepal Workers Peasants Party	2,057	8.99
Others		901	3.94
Total		22,872	100.00
Valid votes		22,872	94.34
Invalid/blank votes		1,373	5.66
Total votes		24,245	100.00
Registered voters/turnout		36,151	67.07
Majority		2,976	
CPN (UML) gain			
Source: Election Commission

==== 2013 Constituent Assembly election ====
Candidate	Party	Votes	%
Laxmi Prasad Pokhrel	CPN (UML)	15,619	37.63
Him Bahadur Shahi	Nepali Congress	13,096	31.55
Thir Bahadur karki	UCPN (Maoist)	7,347	17.70
Jagya Bahadur Shahi	Nepal Workers Peasants Party	3,511	8.46
Others		1,935	4.66
Total		41,508	100.00
Valid votes		41,508	93.46
Invalid/blank votes		2,905	6.54
Total votes		44,413	100.00
Registered voters/turnout		56,447	78.68
Majority		2,523	
CPN (UML) hold			
Source: Election Commission

=== Election in the 2000s ===
==== 2008 Constituent Assembly election ====
Candidate	Party	Votes	%
Raj Bahadur Budha	CPN (UML)	16,292	32.71
Him Bahadur Shahi	Nepali Congress	13,877	27.86
Thir Bahadur karki	CPN (Maoist)	11,271	22.63
Tarka Bahadur Baduwal	Nepal Workers Peasants Party	6,276	12.60
Others		2,091	4.20
Total		49,807	100.00
Valid votes		49,807	93.89
Invalid/blank votes		3,240	6.11
Total votes		53,047	100.00
Registered voters/turnout		85,623	61.95
Majority		2,415	
CPN (UML) gain			
Source: Election Commission

=== Election in the 1990s ===
==== 1999 general election ====
Candidate	Party	Votes	%
Shiv Raj Joshi	Nepali Congress	18,882	45.99
Binod Kumar Shah	CPN (UML)	14,448	35.19
Harka Bahadur Shahi	Nepal Workers Peasants Party	3,962	9.65
Laxmi Prasad Pokharel	CPN (Marxist–Leninist)	2,712	6.60
Others		1,057	2.57
Total		41,061	100.00
Valid votes		41,061	96.64
Invalid/blank votes		1,429	3.36
Total votes		42,490	100.00
Registered voters/turnout		67,417	63.03
Majority		4,434	
Nepali Congress gain			
Source: Election Commission

==== 1994 general election ====
Candidate	Party	Votes	%
Binod Kumar Shah	Nepal Workers Peasants Party	13,640	45.58
Ram Bahadur Shahi	Nepali Congress	6,725	22.47
Brish Bahadur Shahi	Rastriya Prajatantra Party	5,017	16.77
Chakra Nath Yogi	Independent	3,019	10.09
Others		1,522	5.09
Total		29,923	100.00
Majority		6,915	
Nepal Workers Peasants Party gain			
Source: Election Commission

==== 1991 general election ====
Candidate	Party	Votes	%
Rang Bahadur Shahi	Nepali Congress	16,182	57.73
-	Nepal Workers Peasants Party	11,848	42.27
Total		28,030	100.00
Majority		4,334	
Nepali Congress gain			

== See also ==
- List of parliamentary constituencies of Nepal
