= Bhaktapur 2 =

Parliamentary constituency in Nepal

- Parliamentary constituency for the House of Representatives
- Bhaktapur 2 in Bagmati Province

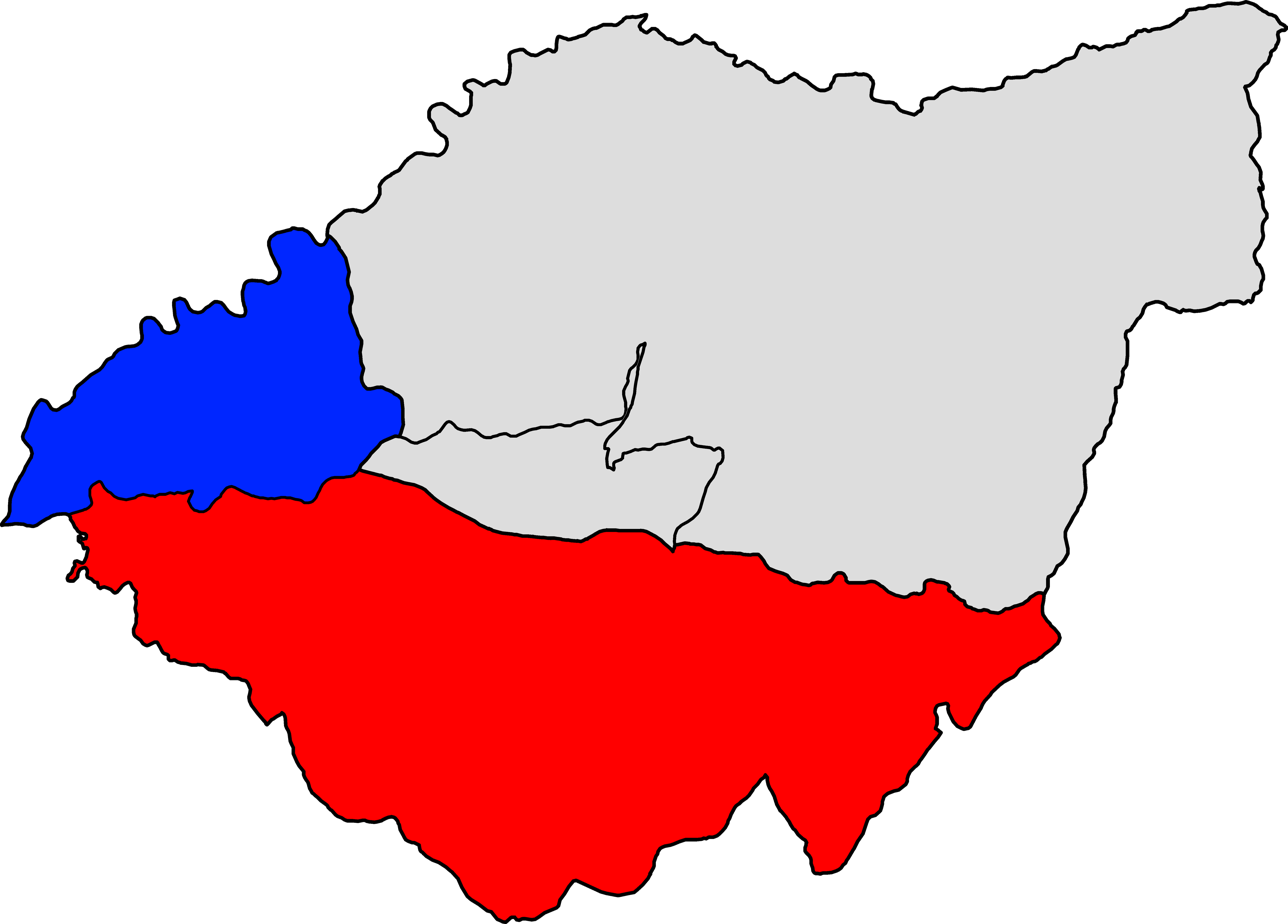
- Assembly segments Bhaktapur 2(A) (red) and Bhaktapur 2(B) (blue) within Bhaktapur
- Province: Bagmati Province
- District: Bhaktapur District
- Electorate: 83,930

Current constituency
- Created: 1991
- Party: Rastriya Swatantra Party
- MP: Rajiv Khatri
- Bagmati MPA 2(A): Kiran Thapamagar (CPN (UML))
- Bagmati MPA 2(B): Rajendra Man Shrestha (Nepali Communist Party)

Bhaktapur 2 is one of two parliamentary constituencies of Bhaktapur District in Nepal. This constituency came into existence on the Constituency Delimitation Commission (CDC) report submitted on 31 August 2017.

== Incorporated areas ==
Bhaktapur 2 parliamentary constituency consists of Suryabinayak Municipality and Madhyapur Thimi Municipality.

== Assembly segments ==
It encompasses the following Bagmati Province Provincial Assembly segment

- Bhaktapur 2(A)
- Bhaktapur 2(B)

== Members of Parliament ==
=== Parliament/Constituent Assembly ===
Election	Member	Party
1991	Jagannath Acharya	Nepali Congress
1994	Aasakaji Basukala	Nepal Workers Peasants Party
1999	Lekh Nath Neupane	Nepali Congress
2008	Sunil Prajapati	Nepal Workers Peasants Party
2013	Rameshwar Prasad Dhungel	Nepali Congress
2017	Mahesh Basnet	CPN (Unified Marxist–Leninist)
May 2018	Mahesh Basnet	Nepal Communist Party
March 2021	Mahesh Basnet	CPN (Unified Marxist–Leninist)
2022	Durlabh Thapa Chhetri	Nepali Congress
2026	Rajiv Khatri	Rastriya Swatantra Party

=== Provincial Assembly ===
==== 2(A) ====
Election	Member	Party
2017	Shasi Jang Thapa	CPN (Unified Marxist–Leninist)
May 2018	Shasi Jang Thapa	Nepal Communist Party
2022	Kiran Thapamagar	CPN (Unified Marxist–Leninist)

==== 2(B) ====
Election	Member	Party
2017	Rajendra Man Shrestha	CPN (Unified Marxist–Leninist)
May 2018	Rajendra Man Shrestha	Nepal Communist Party
March 2021	Rajendra Man Shrestha	CPN (Unified Marxist–Leninist)
August 2021	Rajendra Man Shrestha	CPN (Unified Socialist)
2022	Rajendra Man Shrestha	CPN (Unified Socialist)
November 2025	Rajendra Man Shrestha	Nepali Communist Party

== Election results ==
=== Election in the 2020s ===
==== 2026 general election ====
Candidate	Party	Votes	%
Rajiv Khatri	Rastriya Swatantra Party	42,334	60.67
Mahesh Basnet	CPN (UML)	10,996	15.76
Kabir Rana	Nepali Congress	8,401	12.04
Ramesh Baidhya	Nepal Workers Peasants Party	3,753	5.38
Ram Prasad Sapkota	Nepali Communist Party	1,323	1.90
Bikram Thapa	Rastriya Prajatantra Party	1,224	1.75
Arjun Basu	Shram Sanskriti Party	665	0.95
Jeet Ram Lama	Ujyaalo Nepal Party	619	0.89
Anand Karki	Independent	175	0.25
Others		282	0.40
Total		69,772	100.00
Valid votes		69,772	97.29
Invalid/blank votes		1,943	2.71
Total votes		71,715	100.00
Registered voters/turnout		98,356	72.91
Majority		31,338	
Rastriya Swatantra Party gain			

==== 2022 general election ====
Candidate	Party	Votes	%
Durlabh Thapa Chhetri	Nepali Congress	24,239	38.06
Mahesh Basnet	CPN (UML)	23,282	36.55
Anuradha Thapa Magar	Nepal Workers Peasants Party	7,127	11.19
Sajan B.K.	Rastriya Swatantra Party	4,098	6.43
Mohan K.C.	Rastriya Prajatantra Party	2,569	4.03
Others		2,378	3.73
Total		63,693	100.00
Majority		957	
Nepali Congress gain			

=== Election in the 2010s ===
==== 2017 legislative elections ====
Party	Candidate	Votes
CPN (Unified Marxist–Leninist)	Mahesh Basnet	36,412
Nepali Congress	Daman Nath Dhungana	18,687
Nepal Workers Peasants Party	Anuradha Thapa Magar	5,471
Bibeksheel Sajha Party	Shashi Bikram Karki	1,784
Others		755
Result	CPN (UML) gain	
Source: Election Commission

==== 2017 Nepalese provincial elections ====
===== 2(A) =====
Party	Candidate	Votes
CPN (Unified Marxist–Leninist)	Shasi Jung Thapa	19,515
Nepali Congress	Angat Khadka	9,115
Nepal Workers Peasants Party	Saroj Raj Gosai	2,654
Bibeksheel Sajha Party	Ramesh Rai	1,081
Others		959
Result	CPN UML) gain	
Source: Election Commission

===== 2(B) =====
Party	Candidate	Votes
CPN (Unified Marxist–Leninist)	Rajendra Man Shrestha	14,229
Nepali Congress	Ganesh Man Chitrakar	11,538
Nepal Workers Peasants Party	Premajan Thapa Shrestha	2,355
Bibeksheel Sajha Party	Ram Bhakta Bade	1,088
Others		796
Result	CPN UML) gain	
Source: Election Commission

==== 2013 Constituent Assembly election ====
Party	Candidate	Votes
Nepali Congress	Rameshwar Prasad Dhungel	21,121
Nepal Workers Peasants Party	Sunil Prajapati	17,411
CPN (Unified Marxist–Leninist)	Mahesh Basnet	16,029
UCPN (Maoist)	Devi Prasad Dhakal	5,791
Rastriya Prajatantra Party Nepal	Dipendra Kumar K.C.	2,632
Rastriya Prajatantra Party	Sanu Kaji Heka	1,761
Result	Congress gain	
Source: NepalNews

=== Election in the 2000s ===
==== 2008 Constituent Assembly election ====
Party	Candidate	Votes
Nepal Workers Peasants Party	Sunil Prajapati	18,100
Nepali Congress	Lekh Nath Neupane	13,265
CPN (Unified Marxist–Leninist)	Ganesh Bahadur Khatri	11,769
UCPN (Maoist)	Arjun Bahadur Thapa	10,966
Rastriya Prajatantra Party	Ram Hari Thapa	3,418
Others		4,155
Result	NWPP gain	
Source: Election Commission

=== Election in the 1990s ===
==== 1999 legislative elections ====
Party	Candidate	Votes
Nepali Congress	Lekh Nath Neupane	14,200
Nepal Workers Peasants Party	Sunil Prajapati	13,432
CPN (Unified Marxist–Leninist)	Yuvraj Karki	9,077
Rastriya Prajatantra Party	Ganesh Bahadur Khatri	7,828
CPN (Marxist–Leninist)	Prem Nanda Lal Shrestha	1,591
Rastriya Prajatantra Party (Chand)	Sanukaji Heka	1,314
Samyukta Janamorcha Nepal	Krishna Lal Goja Shrestha	1,044
Others		403
Invalid Votes		886
Result	Congress gain	
Source: Election Commission

==== 1994 legislative elections ====
Party	Candidate	Votes
Nepal Workers Peasants Party	Aasakaji Basukala	13,581
Rastriya Prajatantra Party	Ganesh Bahadur Khatri	11,906
Nepali Congress	Ram Prasad Dawadi	10,630
CPN (Unified Marxist–Leninist)	Rajendra Man Shrestha	8,496
Others		888
Result	NWPP gain	
Source: Election Commission

==== 1991 legislative elections ====
Party	Candidate	Votes
Nepali Congress	Jagannath Acharya	16,052
Nepal Workers Peasants Party	Bhairav Rijal	14,752
Result	Congress gain	

== See also ==
- List of parliamentary constituencies of Nepal
