= Budha (surname) =

Budha (Nepali: बुढा) or Buda is a surname found in Nepal. Budha was an ancient title for a Paikela (warrior) in the Khasa kingdom. The title has been adapted as family name by Khas and Magar ethnicities. Notable people with the surname include:

- Hari Budha Magar, Nepalese sportsman, Former British Army-Royal Gurkha Rifles
- Raj Bahadur Buda Chhetri, Nepalese politician
- Raj Bahadur Budha, Nepalese politician
- Yagya Bahadur Budha Chhetri, Nepalese politician
