= Raj Bahadur Buda Chhetri =

Nepalese politician

Raj Bahadur Budha Kshetri
- राज बहादुर बुढा क्षेत्री

Member of Parliament, Pratinidhi Sabha
- In office 4 March 2018 – 18 September 2022
- Preceded by: Laxmi Prasad Pokhrel
- Constituency: Dailekh 2

Member of Constituent Assembly
- In office 28 May 2008 – 28 May 2012
- Preceded by: Shiva Raj Joshi
- Succeeded by: Laxmi Prasad Pokhrel
- Constituency: Dailekh 2

Personal details
- Born: 17 June 1966 (age 59)
- Party: CPN (UML)
- Other political affiliations: Nepal Majdoor Kisan Party

Raj Bahadur Buda Chhetri is a Nepalese politician, belonging to the Nepal Communist Party currently serving as the member of the 1st Federal Parliament of Nepal. In the 2017 Nepalese general election he was elected from the Dailekh 2 constituency, securing 23323 (52.94%) votes.
