= Sunil Prajapati =

Nepali politician

- सुनिल प्रजापति

Mayor of Bhaktapur
- Incumbent
- Assumed office 2017
- Deputy: Rajani Joshi

Member of Constituent Assembly for Bhaktapur 2
- In office 28 May 2008 – 28 May 2012
- Preceded by: Lekh Nath Neupane
- Succeeded by: Rameshwor Prasad Dhungel

Personal details
- Citizenship: Nepalese
- Party: Nepal Workers Peasants Party

Sunil Prajapati (Nepali: सुनिल प्रजापति) is a Nepalese politician who is the current mayor of Bhaktapur, belonging to the Nepal Workers Peasants Party.

In the 1999 parliamentary election Prajapati contested the Bhaktapur 2 constituency. He finished second with 13,432 votes.

After the fall of King Gyanendra's direct rule in 2006, Prajapati was nominated to the interim legislature of Nepal. Prajapati became a member of the Interim Constitution Drafting Committee.

In April 2008, he won the Bhaktapur-2 seat in the Constituent Assembly election.

== Electoral history ==
Year	Office	Electorate	Party	Main opponent	Votes for Prajapati			Result
Year	Office	Electorate	Party	Main opponent	Total	%	P.	Result
1999	Representative	Bhaktapur 2	Nepal Majdoor Kisan Party	Lekh Nath Neupane	13,432	27.5%	2nd	Lost
2008	Constituent	Bhaktapur 2	Nepal Majdoor Kisan Party	Lekh Nath Neupane	18,100	29.3%	1st	Won
2013	Constituent	Bhaktapur 2	Nepal Majdoor Kisan Party	Rameshwar Prasad Dhungel	17,411	26.9%	2nd	Lost
2017	Mayor	Bhaktapur	Nepal Majdoor Kisan Party	Ram Prasad Kasula	25,730	63.8%	1st	Won
2022	Mayor	Bhaktapur	Nepal Majdoor Kisan Party	Ram Prasad Kasula	29,252	72.3%	1st	Won

== See also ==
- Kumhar
- Prajapati
