= Rameshwor =

Rameshwor is an Indian and Nepali given name. In Hinduism, Rameshwor refers to the Lord of Rama and the name of Lord Shiva.

Notable people with the name include:

- Rameshwor Karki, Nepali cinematographer
- Rameshwor Phuyal, a politician belonging to the Communist Party of Nepal (Unified Marxist-Leninist)
- Rameshwor Prasad Dhungel, a politician belonging to Nepali Congress
