= Kathmandu 4 =

Parliamentary constituency of Kathmandu District, Nepal

- Parliamentary constituency for the House of Representatives
- Kathmandu 4 in Bagmati Province

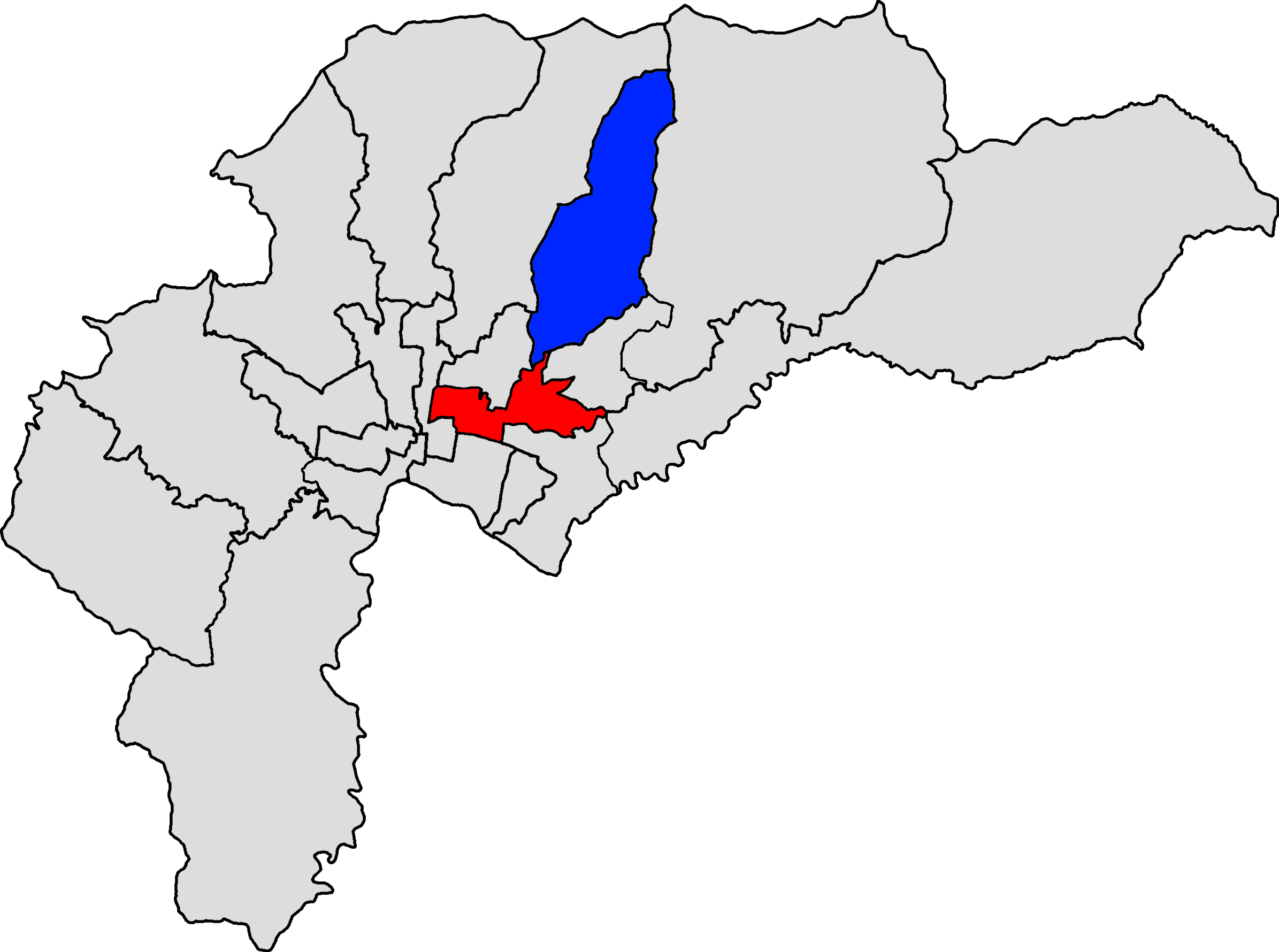
- Assembly segment Kathmandu 4(A) (red) and Kathmandu 4(B) (blue) within Kathmandu District
- Province: Bagmati Province
- District: Kathmandu District
- Electorate: 76,251
- Major settlements: Baluwatar; Lazimpat; Maharajgunj; Hadi Gaun; Naxal; Bansbari; Dhumbarahi, Hattigauda; Golfutar

Current constituency
- Created: 1991
- Party: RSP
- Member of Parliament: Pukar Bam

Kathmandu 4 is one of 10 parliamentary constituencies of Kathmandu District in Nepal. This constituency came into existence on the Constituency Delimitation Commission (CDC) report submitted on 31 August 2017.

== Incorporated areas ==
Kathmandu 4 parliamentary constituency consists of wards 1, 7, 8 and 30 of Kathmandu Metropolitan City and wards 1, 2, 8, 9, 10, 11, 12, 13 of Budhanilkantha Municipality.

== Assembly segments ==
It encompasses the following Bagmati Province Provincial Assembly segment

- Kathmandu 4(A)
- Kathmandu 4(B)

== Members of Parliament ==
=== Parliament/Constituent Assembly ===
Election	Member	Party
1991	Sahana Pradhan	CPN (Unified Marxist-Leninist)
1994	Padma Ratna Tuladhar	CPN (Unified Marxist-Leninist)
March 1998	Padma Ratna Tuladhar	CPN (Marxist-Leninist)
1999	Prem Lal Singh	Nepali Congress
2008	Suprabha Ghimire	Nepali Congress
2013	Gagan Thapa	Nepali Congress
2017	Gagan Thapa	Nepali Congress
2022	Gagan Thapa	Nepali Congress
2026	Pukar Bam	Rastriya Swatantra Party

=== Provincial Assembly ===
==== 4(A) ====
Election	Member	Party
2017	Narottam Baidhya	Nepali Congress

==== 4(B) ====
Election	Member	Party
2017	Kusum Kumar Karki	CPN (Unified Marxist-Leninist)
May 2018	Kusum Kumar Karki	Nepal Communist Party
March 2021	Kusum Kumar Karki	CPN (Unified Marxist–Leninist)
August 2021	Kusum Kumar Karki	CPN (Unified Socialist)

== Election results ==
=== Election in the 2020s ===
==== 2026 general election ====
Candidate	Party	Votes	%
Pukar Bam	Rastriya Swatantra Party	29,142	58.17
Sachin Timalsena	Nepali Congress	8,824	17.61
Rajan Bhattarai	CPN (UML)	5,733	11.44
Surendra Rajbhandari	Rastriya Prajatantra Party	2,025	4.04
Jhanak Bahadur Adhikari	Ujyalo Nepal Party	1,034	2.06
Barun Amatya	Shram Sanskriti Party	756	1.51
Indra Kumar Bhusal	Nepali Communist Party	657	1.31
Binod Babu Pradhan	Independent	102	0.20
Others		1,828	3.65
Total		50,101	100.00
Valid votes		50,101	98.31
Invalid/blank votes		862	1.69
Total votes		50,963	100.00
Registered voters/turnout		76,251	66.84
Majority		20,318	
Rastriya Swatantra Party gain			

==== 2022 general election ====
Candidate	Party	Votes	%
Gagan Thapa	Nepali Congress	21,302	48.37
Rajan Bhattarai	CPN (UML)	13,855	31.46
Thakur Mohan Shrestha	Rastriya Prajatantra Party	4,050	9.20
Arjun Kumar Prasai	Independent	2,308	5.24
Archan Shumsher Rana	Hamro Nepali Party	1,214	2.76
Others		1,310	2.97
Total		44,039	100.00
Majority		7,447	
Nepali Congress hold			

=== Election in the 2010s ===
==== 2017 legislative elections ====
Party	Candidate	Votes
Nepali Congress	Gagan Thapa	21,558
CPN (Unified Marxist-Leninist)	Rajan Bhattarai	18,140
Bibeksheel Sajha Party	Subuna Basnet	3,040
Others		797
Invalid votes		1,054
Result	Congress hold	
Source: Election Commission

==== 2017 Nepalese provincial elections ====
===== Kathmandu 4(A) =====
Party	Candidate	Votes
Nepali Congress	Narottam Baidhya	8,719
CPN (Unified Marxist-Leninist)	Nirmal Kuikel	7,794
Bibeksheel Sajha Party	Dipesh Shrestha Baidhya	3,517
Others		269
Invalid votes		390
Result	Congress gain	
Source: Election Commission

===== Kathmandu 4(B) =====
Party	Candidate	Votes
CPN (Unified Marxist-Leninist)	Kusum Kumar Karki	12,347
Nepali Congress	Sadhuram Khadka	9,354
Bibeksheel Sajha Party	Madhusudhan Karki	1,461
Others		262
Invalid votes		434
Result	CPN (UML)	
Source: Election Commission

==== 2013 Constituent Assembly election ====
Party	Candidate	Votes
Nepali Congress	Gagan Thapa	22,336
CPN (Unified Marxist-Leninist)	Nirmal Kuikel	9,135
UCPN (Maoist)	Nanda Kishor Pun	6,462
Rastriya Prajatantra Party Nepal	Udhhav Paudel	3,263
Others		2,335
Result	Congress hold	
Source: Election Commission

=== Election in the 2000s ===
==== 2008 Constituent Assembly election ====
Party	Candidate	Votes
Nepali Congress	Suprabha Ghimire	13,451
CPN (Unified Marxist-Leninist)	Bidya Devi Bhandari	9,842
CPN (Maoist)	Pawan Man Shrestha	9,225
Rastriya Prajatantra Party Nepal	Raju Aryal	1,631
Others		3,422
Invalid votes		1,477
Result	Congress hold	
Source: Election Commission

=== Election in the 1990s ===
==== 1999 legislative elections ====
Party	Candidate	Votes
Nepali Congress	Prem Lal Singh	12,554
CPN (Unified Marxist-Leninist)	Bharat Kumar Pradhan	7,269
Independent	Marich Man Singh Shrestha	6,531
CPN (Marxist–Leninist)	Padma Ratna Tuladhar	5,340
Rastriya Prajatantra Party	Pankaj Pradhan	1,012
Others		348
Invalid Votes		703
Result	Congress gain	
Source: Election Commission

==== 1994 legislative elections ====
Party	Candidate	Votes
CPN (Unified Marxist-Leninist)	Padma Ratna Tuladhar	17,926
Nepali Congress	Krishna Amatya	9,337
Rastriya Prajatantra Party	Indira Shrestha	4,120
Others		403
Result	CPN (UML) hold	
Source: Election Commission

==== 1991 legislative elections ====
Party	Candidate	Votes
CPN (Unified Marxist-Leninist)	Sahana Pradhan	28,630
Nepali Congress	Prakash Man Singh	19,504
Result	CPN (UML) gain	

== See also ==
- List of parliamentary constituencies of Nepal
