= Rukesh Ranjit =

Nepalese politician

Honourable Rukesh Ranjit
- रुकेश रंजित

Member of Parliament, Pratinidhi Sabha
- Incumbent
- Assumed office 26 March 2026
- Preceded by: Prem Suwal
- Constituency: Bhaktapur 1

Personal details
- Citizenship: Nepalese
- Party: Rastriya Swatantra Party
- Education: Vinayaka Mission's Research Foundation (MBA)
- Profession: Politician

Rukesh Ranjit (Nepali: रुकेश रंजित) is a Nepalese politician serving as a member of parliament from the Rastriya Swatantra Party. He is the member of the 7th Pratinidhi Sabha elected from Bhaktapur 1 constituency in 2026 Nepalese General Election securing 33,436 votes and defeating his closest contender Prem Suwal of the Nepal Workers Peasants Party. He was affiliated with the Bhaktapur Electronic Businessmen's Association until 2012. He holds MBA from Vinayaka Mission's Research Foundation, India.
