= Adhikari ministry =

Adhikari ministry may refer to:

- Council of Ministers of Nepal
  - Man Mohan Adhikari cabinet (1994–1995)
- West Bengal Council of Ministers
  - Suvendu Adhikari ministry (2026–present)
