= Rajiv Khatri =

Nepalese politician and journalist

Rajib Khatry
- राजीव खत्री

Member of Parliament, Pratinidhi Sabha
- Incumbent
- Assumed office 26 March 2026
- Preceded by: Durlabh Thapa Chhetri
- Constituency: Bhaktapur 2

Personal details
- Citizenship: Nepalese
- Party: Rastriya Swatantra Party
- Children: Riwanshu Khatry; Ruhaan Khatry
- Profession: Politician; Journalist

Rajib Khatry (Note: Nepali: राजीव खत्री) is a Nepalese politician and journalist serving as a member of parliament from the Rastriya Swatantra Party. He is the member of the 7th Pratinidhi Sabha elected from Bhaktapur 2 constituency in 2026 Nepalese general election securing 42,334 votes and defeating Mahesh Basnet, secretary of the CPN UML. He served as a senior journalist and news presenter for over 8 years at News 24 Television. He has 2 sons, the oldest being Riwanshu Khatry.
