= Jagya Bahadur Shahi =

Nepali politician

Jagya Bahadur Shahi (Nepali: जज्ञबहादुर शाही) is a Nepalese politician from Dailekh, belonging to the Nepal Workers Peasants Party. Shahi is the chairman of the NWPP youth wing, the Nepal Revolutionary Youth Union.

Shahi was arrested, along with other NWPP activists in Dailekh, in connection with pro-democracy protests on March 31, 2005.

Shahi was appointed as a Member of Parliament, when the interim legislature was formed in January 2007. Shahi swore his oath as a parliamentarian on January 24, 2007.

After the 2008 Constituent Assembly election, Shahi was nominated to the Assembly by the outgoing cabinet.
