= Nepal Janahit Party =

Right-wing monarchist party in Nepal

Nepal Janahit Party (Nepal Welfare Party), a minor right-wing monarchist party in Nepal, founded in the early 1990s, which contested the 1991 and 1994 general elections.
