= Mahesh Basnet (born 1975) =

Nepalese Communist politician

- महेश बस्नेत

Minister of Industry, Commerce and Supplies
- In office 14 September 2014 – 12 October 2015
- President: Ram Baran Yadav
- Prime Minister: Sushil Koirala
- Preceded by: Karna Bahadur Thapa
- Succeeded by: Nabindra Raj Joshi

Member of the House of Representatives
- In office 4 March 2018 – 18 September 2022
- Preceded by: Rameshwor Prasad Dhungel
- Succeeded by: Durlabh Thapa Chhetri
- Constituency: Bhaktapur 2

Chairman of Youth Association Nepal
- Incumbent
- Assumed office 2009

Personal details
- Born: 16 January 1975 (age 51) Suryabinayak-7, Gundu Bhaktapur district
- Party: CPN (UML)
- Spouse: Ambika Basnyat
- Parents: Purna Bahadur Basnet (father); Ishwari Basnet (mother)

Mahesh Basnet (Nepali: महेश बस्नेत) is a Nepalese politician. He was a member of the House of Representatives elected from the Bhaktapur district from 2017 to 2022. He served as Minister of Industry under Prime Minister Sushil Koirala. He served as Chief of Youth Force Nepal in 2008 and is serving as Chairman of Youth Association Nepal since 2009. He contested the 2013 Nepalese Constituent Assembly election from Bhaktapur district constituency number 2. He constantly draws himself into controversy by spreading hate speech and racist comments.

Mahesh Basnet was elected as the Secretary of CPN (UML) from the 11th General Convention

== Family ==
He was born on 16 January, D at G-4, Bhaktapur district to father Purna Bahadur Basnet and mother Ishwari Basnet.

== Gen-Z protest ==
During the 2025 Gen-Z protest in Nepal, the residence of Mahesh Basnet was among the ones vandalized and set on fire. He had mentioned that his dedication to the people hasn't been destroyed, and he and his party will rise again.

The government formed after the Gen-Z protest had been monitoring his activities and planned to arrest him based on an complaint registered to CIB by Januka Pathak. The complaint said that Mahesh Basnet referred to Januka (Sobha) Pathak as "bear" (bhalu) which is a derogatory term in Nepali for whore. Mahesh Basnet has since warned the government against politics of retaliation. Court has asked for more proofs in the writ file by Januka (Sobha) Pathak.

On 19 September 2025, during the aftermath of 2025 Gen-Z protest in Nepal, Mahesh Basnet threatened nepalesetimes.com executive editor Tekman Shakya over his reporting. It was condemned by several media groups in Nepal.

== Opposition to Balen Shah ==
Basnet claims that the Gen-Z movement was driven by international agendas attempting to seize state mechanisms. He also alleged that the vandalism and arson targeting leaders’ homes and other structures were carried out as part of Balen’s plan.
