= Prajatantrik Lok Dal =

Political party in Nepal

Prajatantrik Lok Dal (Nepali: प्रजातान्त्रिक लोक दल, 'Democratic People's Party') was a political party in Nepal. Devendra Pandey was the president of the party, and Tanka Prasad Karki the general secretary. The party contested the 15 November 1994 parliamentary election with 10 candidates. In total the candidates got 3082 votes (0.04% of the national vote). None of its candidates were elected.
