= Bhaktapur 1 =

Parliamentary constituency in Nepal

- Parliamentary constituency for the House of Representatives
- Bhaktapur 1 in Bagmati Province

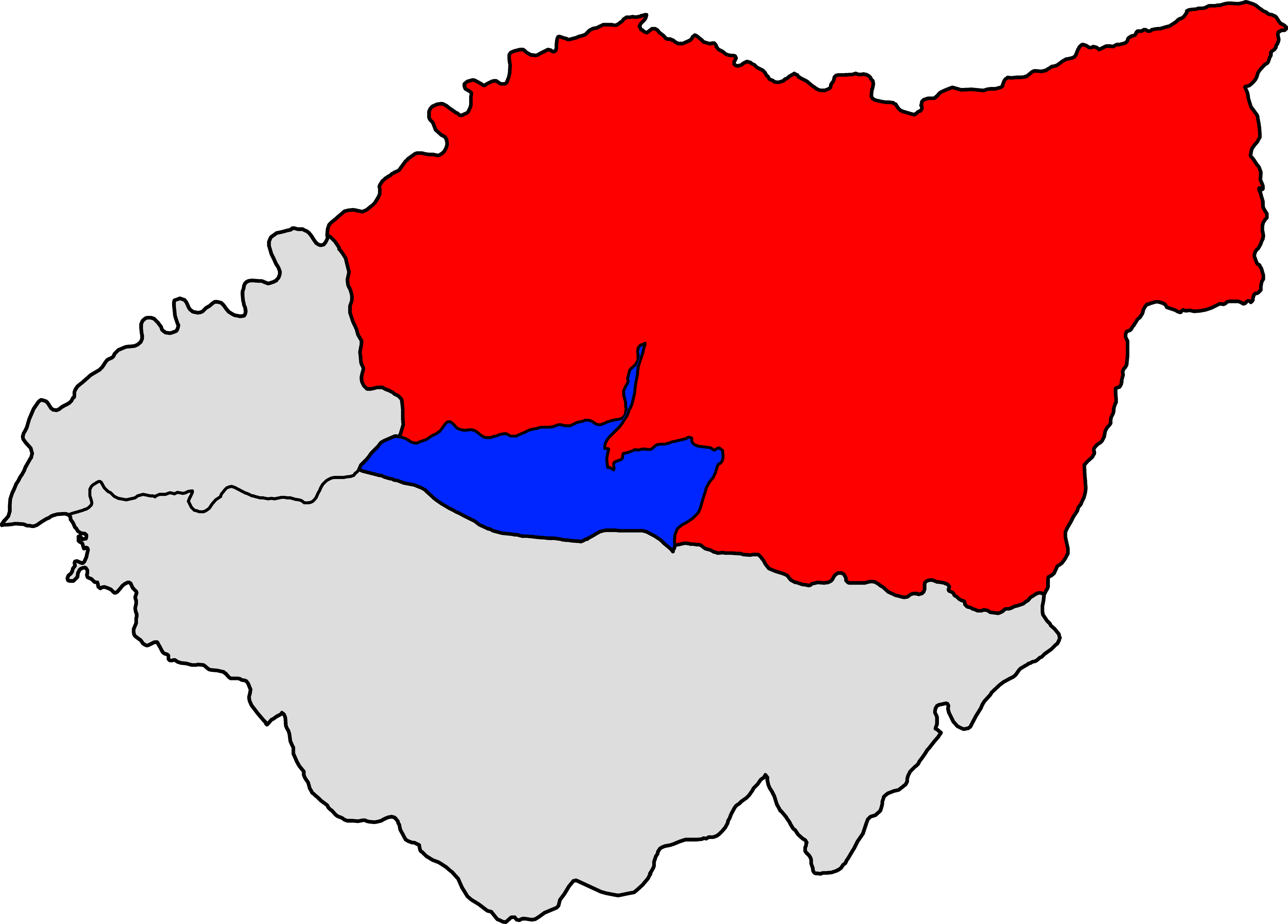
- Assembly segments Bhaktapur 1(A) (red) and Bhaktapur 1(B) (blue) within Bhaktapur District
- Province: Bagmati Province
- District: Bhaktapur District
- Electorate: 94,164

Current constituency
- Created: 1991
- Party: Rastriya Swatantra Party
- MP: Rukesh Ranjit
- Bagmati MPA 1(A): Krishna Lal Bhadel (NC)
- Bagmati MPA 1(B): Surendra Raj Gosai (NMKP)

Bhaktapur 1 is one of two parliamentary constituencies of Bhaktapur District in Nepal. This constituency came into existence on the Constituency Delimitation Commission (CDC) report submitted on 31 August 2017.

== Incorporated areas ==
Bhaktapur 1 parliamentary constituency consists of Bhaktapur Municipality and Changunarayan Municipality.

== Assembly segments ==
It encompasses the following Bagmati Provincial Assembly segments:

- Bhaktapur 1(A)
- Bhaktapur 1(B)

== Members of Parliament ==
=== Parliament/Constituent Assembly ===
Election	Member	Party
1991	Narayan Man Bijukchhe	Nepal Workers Peasants Party
2017	Prem Suwal	Nepal Workers Peasants Party
2022	Prem Suwal	Nepal Workers Peasants Party
2026	Rukesh Ranjit	Rastriya Swatantra Party

=== Provincial Assembly ===
==== 1(A) ====
Election	Member	Party
2017	Hari Sharan Lamichhane	CPN (Unified Marxist–Leninist)
May 2018	Hari Sharan Lamichhane	Nepal Communist Party
2019 by-election	Krishna Lal Bhadel	Nepali Congress

==== 1(B) ====
Election	Member	Party
2017	Surendra Raj Gosai	Nepal Workers Peasants Party

== Election results ==
=== Election in the 2020s ===
==== 2022 general election ====
Candidate	Party	Votes	%
Prem Suwal	Nepal Workers Peasants Party	42,761	59.63
Navaraj Gelal	CPN (UML)	11,968	16.69
Bharat Bahadur Khadka Khadka	Rastriya Prajatantra Party	9,303	12.97
Sunil Gothe	CPN (Maoist Centre)	5,283	7.37
Others		2,394	3.34
Total		71,709	100.00
Majority		30,793	
Nepal Workers Peasants Party hold			

=== Election in the 2010s ===
==== 2019 by-elections ====
===== 1(A) =====
Party	Candidate	Votes
Nepali Congress	Krishna Lal Bhadel	13,449
Nepal Communist Party	Devi Prasad Dhakal	11,206
Nepal Workers Peasants Party	Niraj Lawaju	5,829
Others		1,108
Result	Congress gain	
Source: NepalNews

==== 2017 legislative elections ====
Party	Candidate	Votes
Nepal Workers Peasants Party	Prem Suwal	33,076
Nepali Congress	Babu Raja Joshi	17,818
CPN (Maoist Centre)	Milan Suwal	15,374
Bibeksheel Sajha Party	Dipesh Neupane	2,330
Others		1,867
Result	NWP hold	
Source: Election Commission

==== 2017 Nepalese provincial elections ====
===== Bhaktapur 1(A) =====
Party	Candidate	Votes
CPN (Unified Marxist–Leninist)	Hari Sharan Lamichhane	12,789
Nepali Congress	Jeevan Khatri	9,977
Nepal Workers Peasants Party	Niraj Lawaju	7,019
Others		2,178
Result	CPN UML) gain	
Source: Election Commission

===== Bhaktapur 1(B) =====
Party	Candidate	Votes
Nepal Workers Peasants Party	Surendra Raj Gosai	23,885
CPN (Maoist Centre)	Roman Shilakar	8,063
Nepali Congress	Anil Bhuju	5,447
Others		1,182
Result	NWPP gain	
Source: Election Commission

==== 2013 Constituent Assembly election ====
Party	Candidate	Votes
Nepal Workers Peasants Party	Narayan Man Bijukchhe	20,446
Nepali Congress	Krishna Lal Bhadel	12,826
UCPN (Maoist)	Sanu Suwal	6,296
CPN (Unified Marxist–Leninist)	Ranju Napit	5,668
Rastriya Prajatantra Party	Rabindra Pratap Shah	4,458
Rastriya Prajatantra Party Nepal	Madhav Khatri	2,643
Result	NWPP hold	
Source: NepalNews

=== Election in the 2000s ===
==== 2008 Constituent Assembly election ====
Party	Candidate	Votes
Nepal Workers Peasants Party	Narayan Man Bijukchhe	19,972
CPN (Maoist)	Debendra Shrestha	11,548
Nepali Congress	Mahesh Shrestha	8,281
CPN (Unified Marxist–Leninist)	Krishna Sundar Dhyo	7,327
Rastriya Prajatantra Party	Surendra Pratap Shah	3,215
Others		2,592
Result	NWPP hold	
Source: Election Commission

=== Election in the 1990s ===
==== 1999 legislative elections ====
Party	Candidate	Votes
Nepal Workers Peasants Party	Narayan Man Bijukchhe	16,533
Nepali Congress	Ganesh Man Chakradhar	10,030
CPN (Unified Marxist–Leninist)	Sarswati Bati	8,096
Rastriya Prajatantra Party (Chand)	Surendra Pratap Shah	3,895
Rastriya Prajatantra Party	Yabati Karki	1,992
CPN (Marxist–Leninist)	Ram Sharan Dhimal	1,238
Others		844
Invalid Votes		771
Result	NWPP hold	
Source: Election Commission

==== 1994 legislative elections ====
Party	Candidate	Votes
Nepal Workers Peasants Party	Narayan Man Bijukchhe	16,770
Rastriya Prajatantra Party	Surendra Pratap Shah	9,438
Nepali Congress	Radhe Shyam Jonche	8,137
CPN (Unified Marxist–Leninist)	Narayan Bhakta Wati	5,689
Samyukta Janamorcha Nepal	Kanchi Maharjan	412
Result	NWPP hold	
Source: Election Commission

==== 1991 legislative elections ====
Party	Candidate	Votes
Nepal Workers Peasants Party	Narayan Man Bijukchhe	20,163
Nepali Congress	Raghesh Man Jonche	13,732
Result	NWPP gain	

== See also ==
- List of parliamentary constituencies of Nepal
