= Durlabh Thapa Chhetri =

Nepalese politician

- दुर्लभ थापा क्षेत्री

Member of the House of Representatives
- In office 22 December 2022 – 12 September 2025
- Preceded by: Mahesh Basnet
- Succeeded by: Rajiv Khatri
- Constituency: Bhaktapur 2

Personal details
- Born: 7 September 1968 (age 57) Bhaktapur District
- Party: Nepali Congress
- Spouse: Sushila Thapa Chhetri
- Parent: Ram Bahadur Thapa Chhetri (father)

Durlabh Thapa Chhetri is a Nepalese politician, belonging to the Nepali Congress currently serving as a member of the 2nd Federal Parliament of Nepal. In the 2022 Nepalese general election, he won the election from Bhaktapur 2.
