= Binod Kumar Shah =

Nepali politician

Personal details
- Party: Non

Binod Kumar Shah is a Nepalese politician. In the 1994 election he was elected to the Pratinidhi Sabha as the candidate of the Nepal Workers Peasants Party from the Dailekh-2 constituency. Shah won with 13640 votes against 6725 votes for Ranga Bahadur Shahi of the Nepali Congress. Shah later joined the Communist Party of Nepal (Unified Marxist-Leninist) along with his entire team in the districts of Bheri and Karnali zones, which caused a rift between NWPP and CPN(UML). In July 2005, he was appointed Assistant Minister for Water Resource by King Gyanendra. Now, he has been engaging in politics of Nepal being as a Central Committee member of Nepal Communist Party.
