= Prem Suwal =

Nepalese politician

The Honorable Prem Suwal MP
- प्रेम सुवाल

Member of Parliament, Pratinidhi Sabha
- In office 4 March 2018 – 12 September 2025
- Preceded by: Narayan Man Bijukchhe
- Succeeded by: Rukesh Ranjit
- Constituency: Bhaktapur 1

Member of Constituent Assembly for Nepal Majdoor Kisan Party list
- In office 21 January 2014 – 14 October 2017

Mayor of Bhaktapur
- In office 1997–2001

Personal details
- Born: 18 June 1960 (age 65) Bhaktapur, Nepal
- Party: Nepal Majdoor Kisan Party

Prem Suwal is a Nepalese politician, secretary to central committee of the Nepal Majdoor Kisan Party currently serving as a member of the 1st Federal Parliament of Nepal. In the 2017 Nepalese general election, he was elected from the Bhaktapur 1 constituency, securing 33076 (46.94%) votes. He also served as the former mayor of Bhaktapur.
