= Padma Ratna Tuladhar =

Nepali politician

- पद्मरत्न तुलाधर
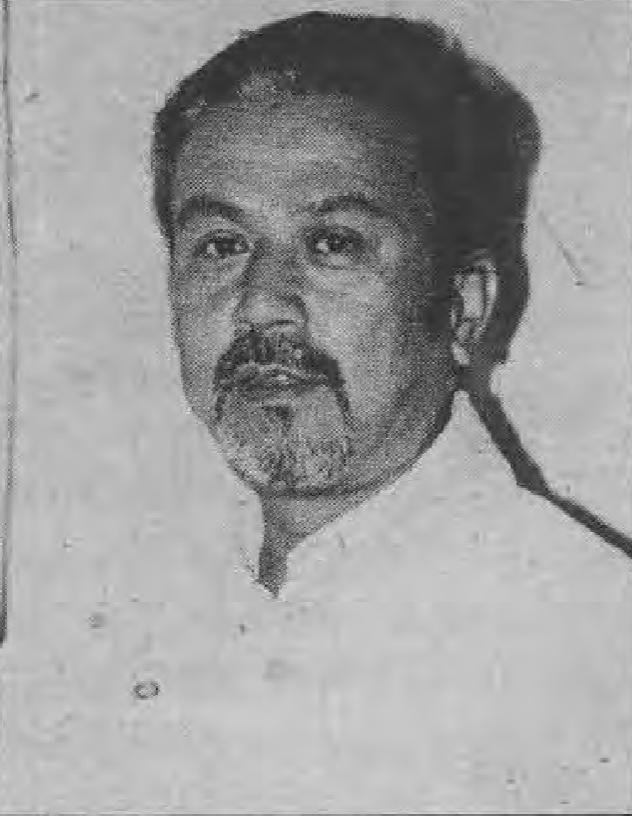
- Tuladhar in 1992

Member of the Rastriya Panchayat
- In office 1986–1990
- Constituency: Kathmandu District

Member of Parliament, Pratinidhi Sabha
- In office 20 June 1991 – 11 July 1994
- Monarch: King Birendra
- Succeeded by: Man Mohan Adhikari
- Constituency: Kathmandu 3
- In office October 1994 – May 1999
- Preceded by: Sahana Pradhan
- Succeeded by: Prem Lal Singh
- Constituency: Kathmandu 4

Minister for Labour and Health
- In office 30 November 1994 – 12 September 1995
- Monarch: King Birendra
- Prime Minister: Man Mohan Adhikari

Personal details
- Died: 4 November 2018 Kathmandu, Nepal
- Party: CPN (UML)
- Other political affiliations: CPN (ML)

Padma Ratna Tuladhar (Nepali: पद्मरत्न तुलाधर) (1940–2018) was a Nepalese politician and human rights activist. A resident of Kathmandu, he played an instrumental role in bringing the Nepali Maoists to mainstream politics from armed struggle.

He was elected to the Rastriya Panchayat from Kathmandu in the 1986 election. Following the restoration of multi party democracy he was elected to the Pratinidhi Sabha from Kathmandu 4 in 1991. He served in the cabinet of Prime Minister Man Mohan Adhikari as Minister for Labour and Health.

Tuladhar died at Kathmandu on 4 November 2018 due to a brain hemorrhage. He is survived by his wife Nil Shova Tuladhar and four children.

== See also ==
- Adhikari cabinet, 1994
- Tuladhar
- Winners and runners-up in the legislative elections of Nepal 1994
