= Vinayaka Mission's Research Foundation =

Deemed-to-be-university in Tamil Nadu, India

Coordinates: 11°35′49″N 78°5′2″E

- Type: Deemed University
- Established: 1981
- Founder: Dr. A. Shanmugasundaram
- Chancellor: Dr. A. S. Ganesan
- Vice-Chancellor: Dr. P. K. Sudhir
- Location: Sankari Main Road (NH-47), Ariyanoor, Salem 636308, Tamil Nadu, India
- Website: https://www.vmrfdu.edu.in

Vinayaka Mission's Research Foundation is a UGC, Government of India recognized private deemed-to-be-university located in Salem, Tamil Nadu, India. In 2015, the university was accredited by National Assessment and Accreditation Council.

== History ==
Vinayaka Mission’s Research Foundation traces its origins to 1981, when the Thirumuruga Kirupananda Variyar Thavathiru Sundara Swamigal Medical Educational and Charitable Trust was established. In 1982, its founder, Dr. A. Shanmugasundaram, established Vinayaka Mission’s College of Pharmacy in Salem, marking the beginning of the group’s educational institutions.

The group subsequently expanded into dentistry, engineering, homoeopathy, nursing, arts and science, physiotherapy, and medicine, establishing institutions in Salem, Chennai, Puducherry and Karaikal.

In 2001, Vinayaka Missions was granted deemed-to-be-university status by the Ministry of Human Resource Development, Government of India, on the recommendation of the University Grants Commission, under Section 3 of the UGC Act, 1956. It became known as Vinayaka Mission’s Research Foundation (Deemed to be University). The university subsequently expanded its academic offerings to include allied health sciences, law, rehabilitation and behavioural sciences, and economics and public policy.

== Honours ==
On 6 July 2008, VMRF founder Dr. A. Shanmugasundaram conferred an honorary doctorate in philosophy on the MIC deputy president Datuk Seri G. Palanivel for his contribution to politics and the Indian community in Malaysia.

== Rankings ==
- NIRF India Rankings 2025 – Pharmacy: Ranked 99th in India, as recorded in the university’s ranking documents.
- NIRF India Rankings 2024 – University: Placed in the 151–200 rank band.
- QS Asia University Rankings 2026: Placed in the 1301–1400 rank band.
- Times Higher Education World University Rankings 2026: Placed in the 1501+ rank band, according to the university’s published ranking certificate listing.
- Times Higher Education World University Rankings by Subject 2026 – Engineering: Placed in the 801–1000 rank band, according to the university’s records.
- Times Higher Education World University Rankings by Subject 2026 – Medical and Health: Placed in the 1001+ rank band, according to the university’s records.
- Times Higher Education Asia University Rankings 2025: Placed in the 601+ rank band, according to the university’s records.
- ·EducationWorld Grand Jury India Higher Education Rankings 2023–24 – New Age Study Programmes Leader: Ranked 6th in India and 1st in Tamil Nadu, as reported on the university website.
- · India Today–MDRA Rankings 2023 – General Private Universities: Ranked 36th in India, as reported on the university website.

University rankings

Pharmacy – India
- NIRF (2024): 89

== Colleges ==
1. Vinayaka Mission’s Kirupananda Variyar Medical College & Hospitals, Salem.
2. Aarupadai Veedu Medical College & Hospital, Puducherry.
3. Vinayaka Mission’s Medical College & Hospital, Karaikal.
4. Vinayaka Mission’s Sankarachariyar Dental College, Salem.
5. Vinayaka Mission’s Kirupananda Variyar Engineering College, Salem.
6. Aarupadai Veedu Institute of Technology, Paiyanoor, Chennai campus.
7. Vinayaka Mission’s College of Pharmacy, Salem.
8. Vinayaka Mission’s Homoeopathic Medical College & Hospital, Salem.
9. Vinayaka Mission’s Annapoorana College of Nursing, Salem.
10. Vinayaka Mission’s College of Nursing, Puducherry.
11. Vinayaka Mission’s College of Nursing, Karaikal.
12. Vinayaka Mission’s College of Physiotherapy, Salem.
13. Shanmuga College of Physiotherapy, Karaikal.
14. Vinayaka Mission’s Kirupananda Variyar Arts & Science College, Salem.
15. Vinayaka Mission’s College of Physical Education, Salem.
16. Vinayaka Mission’s Law School, Paiyanoor, Chennai campus.
17. School of Allied Health Sciences, VIMS Campus, Salem.
18. School of Allied Health Sciences, Vinayaka Mission’s Kirupananda Variyar Medical College & Hospitals Campus, Salem.
19. School of Allied Health Sciences, Aarupadai Veedu Medical College & Hospital Campus, Puducherry.
20. School of Allied Health Sciences, Paiyanoor, Chennai campus.
21. School of Allied Health Sciences, VMMC, Karaikal.
22. School of Physiotherapy, Puducherry.
23. School of Arts and Science, AVIT Campus, Paiyanoor, Chennai campus.
24. School of Rehabilitation and Behavioral Sciences, Aarupadai Veedu Medical College & Hospital Campus, Puducherry.
25. School of Rehabilitation and Behavioral Sciences, Vinayaka Mission’s Medical College Campus, Karaikal.
26. Variyar School of Rehabilitation and Behavioural Sciences, Salem.
27. Vinayaka Mission’s School of Economics and Public Policy, Paiyanoor, Chennai campus

== Notable alumni ==
- Divyanshu Kumar, Software Developer
- Rukesh Ranjit, Nepalese Politician
