= Majdoor =

- Format: Print, online
- Owner: Nepal Workers Peasants Party
- Publisher: Uddhav Sujakhu
- Editor-in-chief: Bishnu Gopal Kusi
- Founded: 1975
- Political alignment: Scientific Socialist
- Language: Nepali language
- Headquarters: Bhaktapur
- Country: Nepal
- Sister newspapers: Shramik
- Website: https://onlinemajdoor.com/

Majdoor (lit. 'Worker') is a daily newspaper published from Bhaktapur, Nepal. It is an organ of the Nepal Workers Peasants Party. As of 2012 Bishnu Gopal Kusi was the chief editor of the newspaper. As of 2025 Surendra Raj Gosai is the editor of Majdoor.
