= Narayan Man Bijukchhe =

Nepalese politician

- नारायणमान बिजुक्छे
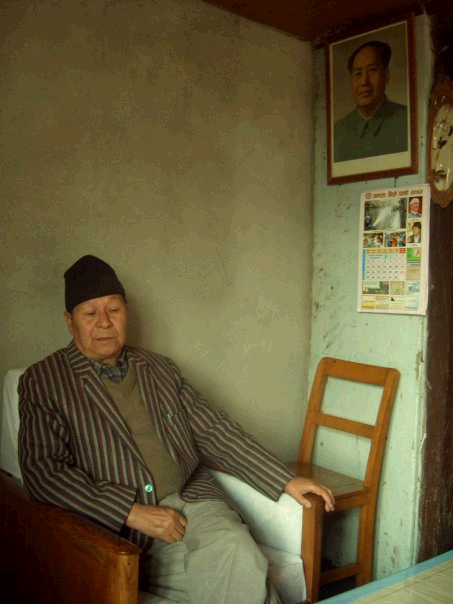

Chairman of Nepal Workers Peasants Party
- Incumbent
- Assumed office January 1975
- Preceded by: Position established

Member of Parliament for Bhaktapur 1
- In office May 1991 – 14 October 2017
- Preceded by: Constituency established
- Succeeded by: Prem Suwal

Personal details
- Born: 9 March 1939 (age 87) Sukuldhoka, 5 Bhaktapur
- Citizenship: Nepalese
- Party: Nepal Workers and Peasants Party
- Other political affiliations: CPN (Pushpa Lal); Communist Party of Nepal
- Spouse: Shova Pradhan
- Children: 2 Subeg Bijukchhen; Suban Bijukchhen
- Parents: Ganesh Man Bijukchhe; Surya Maya Bijukchhe
- Occupation: Teacher, Politician
- Profession: Leader
- Nickname: Rohit

Narayan Man Bijukchhe (Nepali: नारायणमान बिजुक्छे, party name 'Rohit'; born March 9, 1939) is a Nepalese politician. Bijukchhe is the Chairman of the Nepal Workers' and Peasants' Party.

== Life and career ==
Bijukchhe was born in Sukuldhoka, Nepal. He became a communist sympathizer after seeing the relief work of Communist Party of Nepal cadres during floods in Rautahat around 1954. Around 1956 he joined the Students Federation and became a Communist Party member the following year. Bijukchhe became a prominent figure in the agrarian struggles in the Dhanusa, Parsa and Rautahat districts. In 1961 he became the president of the Students Union at Bhaktapur College.

In the early 1970s, Bijukchhe became a Central Committee member of Pushpa Lal Shrestha's Communist Party of Nepal. He was put in charge of the Bagmati, Narayani and Janakpur zone. He went against the leadership of Pushpa Lal Shrestha. Bijukchhe criticized the decision of Pushpa Lal and the party to support the Indian intervention in East Pakistan, the policy of seeking cooperation with Nepali Congress and the failure of the party to condemn the Soviet Union as an imperialist power.

In 1975 he founded the Nepal Workers and Peasants Organisation (which later became the Nepal Workers and Peasants Party). The influence of the group remained largely confined to Bhaktapur, but in that area it became successful in mobilizing tenants and gaining influence inside panchayat institutions.

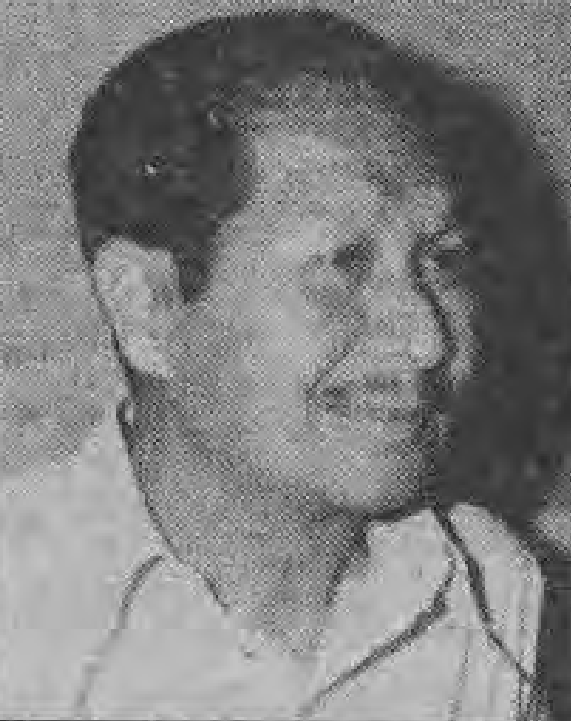
Bijukchhe in 1992

During the 1990s, Bijukchhe was elected to parliament three times, in 1991, 1994 and 1999. In 2006, Bijukchhe was one of the signatories of the historic agreement between the Seven Party Alliance and the Communist Party of Nepal. In the 2008 Constituent Assembly election, Bijukchhe won the Bhaktapur-1 seat with 19,972 votes, thus having won a seat in all national elections since the 1990 Jana Andolan. Bijukchhe has emerged as a strong critic of the proposal to divide Nepal into ethnic and linguistic states, arguing that such a federalist concept might produce violent conflicts.

On June 12, 2010, Bijukchhe withdrew his support to the coalition government led by Madhav Kumar Nepal.

He was a member of the 2nd Nepalese Constituent Assembly. He won the Bhaktapur–1 seat in the 2013 Constituent Assembly election as a candidate of the Nepal Workers and Peasants Party. In 2017 November, he said he had decided not to contest in the 2017 Nepalese legislative election as he wanted to give chance to the new generation of leaders.

== Visits in North Korea ==
Bijukche has visited North Korea four times on the invitation of the latter's government. Portraits of Kim Il Sung and Kim Jong Il are hanged in his office alongside these of Marx, Lenin, Stalin and Mao. Bhaktapur residents have questioned the relevance of North Korean ideology (Juche) imported to Nepal - Juche is part of the ideology of NWPP.
