= Dikpal Kumar Shahi =

Nepalese politician

Honourable Dikpal Kumar Shahi
- दिक्पाल कुमार शाहि

Member of Parliament, Pratinidhi Sabha
- In office 22 December 2022 – 12 September 2025
- Preceded by: Raj Bahadur Budha
- Succeeded by: Laxmi Prasad Pokhrel (elect)
- Constituency: Dailekh 2

Personal details
- Born: 18 April 1961 (age 64) Dailekh District
- Party: Nepali Congress
- Spouse: Mohani Shahi
- Children: Shailendra Shahi, Shadiksha Shahi, Sandesh Shahi and Samunya Shahi
- Parent: Raj Bahadur Shahi (father)

Dikpal Kumar Shahi is a Nepalese politician, belonging to the Nepali Congress currently serving as a member of the 2nd Federal Parliament of Nepal. In the 2022 Nepalese general election, he won the election from Dailekh 2 (constituency).
