= Raj Bahadur Budha =

Nepalese politician

- राजबहादुर बुढा

Member of Parliament, Pratinidhi Sabha
- In office 4 March 2018 – 18 September 2022
- Preceded by: Laxmi Prasad Pokhrel (as Member of the Constituent Assembly)
- Succeeded by: Dikpal Kumar Shahi
- Constituency: Dailekh 2

Member of the Constituent Assembly
- In office 28 May 2008 – 28 May 2012
- Preceded by: Shiv Raj Joshi (as Member of Parliament)
- Succeeded by: Laxmi Prasad Pokhrel

Personal details
- Party: Communist Party of Nepal (Unified Marxist-Leninist)

Raj Bahadur Budha (Nepali: राजबहादुर बुढा) is a Nepalese politician, belonging to the Communist Party of Nepal (Unified Marxist-Leninist). In the 2008 Constituent Assembly election he was elected from the Dailekh-2 constituency, winning 16292 votes.
