= Man Mohan Adhikari cabinet =

Government of Nepal from 1994 to 1995

1994 Adhikari cabinet
- Cabinet of Nepal
- November 1994–September 1995
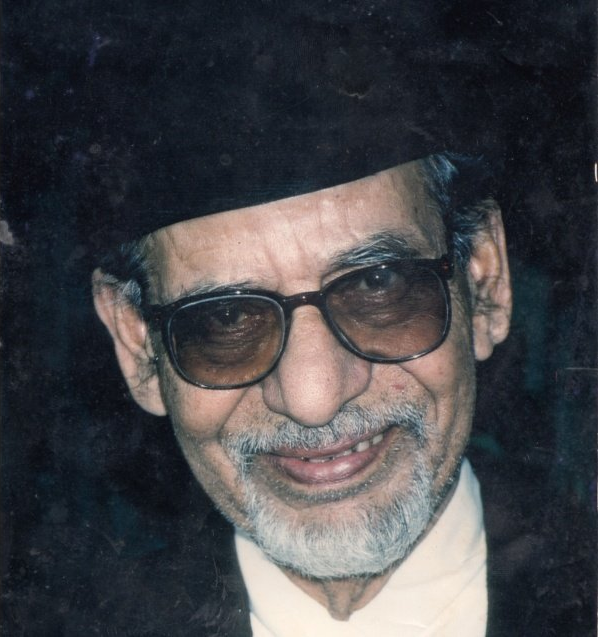
- Date formed: 30 November 1994
- Date dissolved: 12 September 1995

People and organisations
- Monarch: King Birendra
- Prime Minister: Man Mohan Adhikari
- Deputy Prime Minister: Madhav Kumar Nepal
- Total no. of members: 15 appointments
- Member party: CPN (Unified Marxist–Leninist)
- Status in legislature: Minority in Pratinidhi Sabha
- Opposition party: Nepali Congress
- Opposition leader: Girija Prasad Koirala

History
- Election: 1994 general election
- Legislature term: 3rd House of Representatives
- Predecessor: First G.P. Koirala cabinet
- Successor: First Deuba cabinet

On November 30, 1994, following the 1994 parliamentary election, the Communist Party of Nepal (Unified Marxist-Leninist) formed a minority government led by Man Mohan Adhikari. Despite the Nepali Congress securing more popular votes than the Communist Party of Nepal (Unified Marxist-Leninist), the latter secured 88 seats to the former's 83. Neither party was successful in forming a coalition to hold a majority of the 205 seats. After failed coalition negotiations, Adhikari became Prime Minister of a minority government, acquiring the support of the Rastriya Prajatantra Party and the Nepal Sadbhawana Party.

Adhikari only served as the Prime Minister of Nepal for nine months and was the first democratically elected prime minister from the Communist Party of Nepal (Unified Marxist-Leninist). During his time in office, then chief of the World Bank, Paul Wolfowitz rejected funding the Arun III hydro-electric project Also, the Adhikari government promoted programs such as the build-your-own-village-program. Prime Minister Adhikari also enhanced the relationship with Mongolia.

In June 1995, the Rastriya Prajatantra Party and the Nepal Sadbhawana Party, who helped to form a minority government supported the Nepali Congress's call for a vote of no-confidence in Adhikari's government in a special session of the House of Representatives. Adhikari attempted to dissolve parliament and call elections in an attempt to replicate the circumstances under which he assumed office in 1994. But a Supreme Court challenge led by the Congress saw this move deemed unconstitutional and the parliament was restored. The vote of no-confidence proceeded successfully. Elections in 1995 saw Adhikari's government voted out of office and made Nepali Congress's Sher Bahadur Deuba the next Prime Minister of Nepal.

== Ministers ==
| Portfolio | Minister |
|---|---|
Cabinet ministers
| Prime Minister Minister for General Administration | Man Mohan Adhikari |
| Deputy Prime Minister Minister of Defence Minister of Foreign Affairs | Madhav Kumar Nepal |
| Minister for Local Development and Supplies | C.P. Mainali |
| Minister of Home Affairs | K. P. Sharma Oli |
| Minister of Finance | Bharat Mohan Adhikari |
| Minister for Agriculture, Land Reform and Management | Radha Krishna Mainali |
| Minister of Education, Culture and Social Welfare | Modanath Prasrit |
| Minister of Information and Communications | Pradip Nepal |
| Minister for Labour and Health | Padma Ratna Tuladhar |
State ministers
| Minister of State for Construction and Transportation | Ashok Kumar Rai |
| Minister of State for Forest and Environment | Salim Miya Ansari |
| Minister of State for Housing and Physical Planning | Prem Singh Dhami |
| Minister of State for Law, Justice, Parliamentary Affairs and General Administration | Subas Chandra Nemwang |
| Minister of State for Commerce, Tourism and Civil Aviation | Bhim Rawal |
| Minister of State for Industry and Water Resource | Hari Pandey |
