= Pukar Bam =

Nepalese politician

Honourable Pukar Bam
- पुकार बम

Member of the House of Representatives
- Incumbent
- Assumed office 26 March 2026
- Preceded by: Gagan Thapa
- Constituency: Kathmandu 4

Personal details
- Citizenship: Nepalese
- Party: Rastriya Swatantra Party
- Other political affiliations: Bibeksheel Sajha Party (till Jan 2026)
- Education: Master in Public Administration (Harvard Kennedy School)

Pukar Bam (Note: Nepali: पुकार बम) is a Nepalese politician serving as a member of parliament from the Rastriya Swatantra Party. He is the member of the 3rd Federal Parliament of Nepal elected from Kathmandu 4 constituency in 2026 Nepalese General Election securing 29,142 votes and defeating Sachin Timilsena of the Nepali Congress. He also served as a chief of the negotiation team of Rastriya Swatantra Party. Bam is also a key founding member of Bibeksheel Sajha Party which had already merged with Rastriya Swatantra Party before the 2026 Election. He is an Edward S. Mason Fellow at Harvard University.
