= Lekh Nath Neupane =

Nepali politician

Personal details
- Party: Nepali Congress

Lekh Nath Neupane (Nepali: लेखनाथ न्यौपाने) is a Nepalese politician. He was elected to the Pratinidhi Sabha in the 1999 election on behalf of the Nepali Congress.
