= Laxmi Prasad Pokhrel =

Nepali politician

- लक्ष्मी प्रसाद पोख्रेल

Member of Parliament, Pratinidhi Sabha
- Assuming office TBD
- Succeeding: Dikpal Kumar Shahi
- Constituency: Dailekh 2

Member of the Constituent Assembly
- In office 21 January 2014 – 14 October 2017
- Preceded by: Raj Bahadur Budha
- Succeeded by: Raj Bahadur Budha (as Member of Parliament)
- Constituency: Dailekh 2

Personal details
- Party: Communist Party of Nepal (Unified Marxist-Leninist)

Laxmi Prasad Pokhrel (Nepali: लक्ष्मी प्रसाद पोख्रेल) is a member of 2nd Nepalese Constituent Assembly. He won Dailekh–2 seat in 2013 Nepalese Constituent Assembly election from Communist Party of Nepal (Unified Marxist-Leninist).
