= Shiv Raj Joshi =

Nepalese politician

Honourable Shiv Raj Joshi
- शिवराज जोशी

Government of Nepal, former minister information and communication
- Incumbent
- Assumed office Singha Durbar
- Monarch: Birendra Bir Bikram Shah Dev
- Prime Minister: Girija Prasad Koirala
- Leader: Nepali Congress
- Constituency: Surkhet 2 and the then Surkhet-3

Personal details
- Born: Surkhet, Rekcha, Gutu
- Party: Nepali Congress

Shiv Raj Joshi (Nepali: शिवराज जोशी) is a Nepalese politician. He was elected to the Pratinidhi Sabha in the 1999 election on behalf of the Nepali Congress. He was elected to the House of Representatives from Surkhet in the 2048, 2051 and 2056 BS. He has been a Minister of the . First as an assistant minister, second as a minister of state, and also served as the Minister of Information and Communications in the Prime minister Girija Prasad Koirala cabinet. Joshi is a permanent resident of Chaukune Rural Municipality Ward No 8 Gutu.
