= Rameshwor Prasad Dhungel =

Nepali politician

Personal details
- Party: Nepali Congress

Rameshwor Prasad Dhungel (Nepali: रामेश्वर प्रसाद ढुंगेल), a regional chairman of Nepali Congress, is a member of the 2nd Nepalese Constituent Assembly. He won the Bhaktapur–2 seat in 2013 Nepalese Constituent Assembly election from the Nepali Congress.

== Personal life ==
Rameshwor Prasad Dhungel was born on 12 July 1960 in Katunje, Bhaktapur to Dasharath Dhungel and Lila Kumari Dhungel. He holds Bachelor's Degree in Humanities Faculty.

== Political career ==
He started his political career since 1979. He was elected as Chairman of Katunje VDC in 1992 and in 1997 twice. He also served as the chairman of Kajunte Ghattekhola Drinking Water Project, Zonal Representative of Nepal Children's Organization, Central Representative of National Cooperative Association, Founding Chairman of Ganesh Man Memorial Foundation.
