= 1994 Nepalese general election =

- 15 November 1994

All 205 seats in the House of Representatives 103 seats needed for a majority
- Turnout: 61.86%
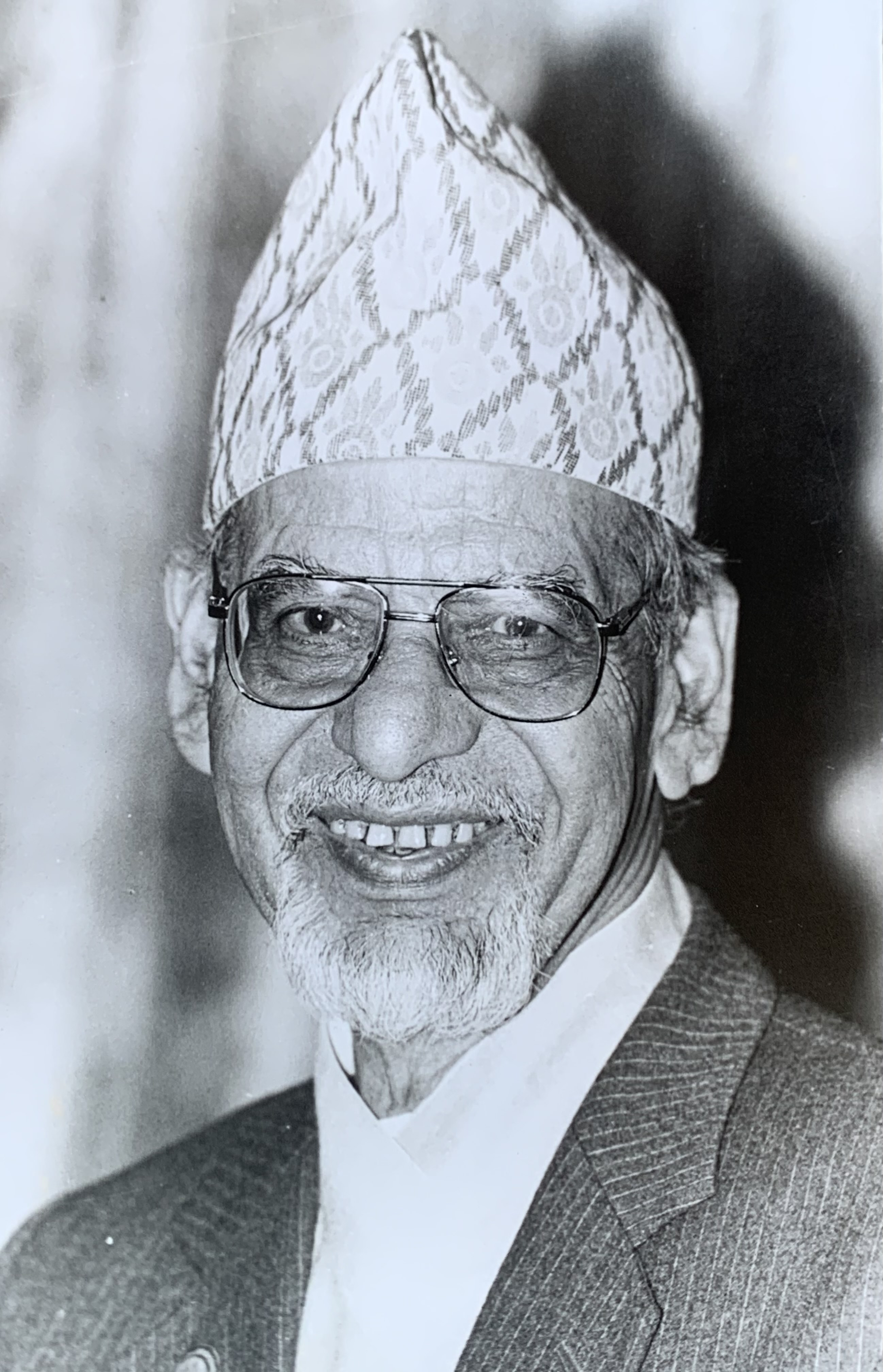

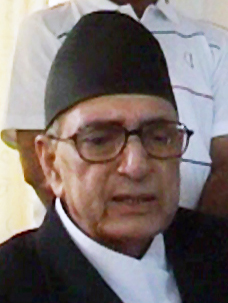

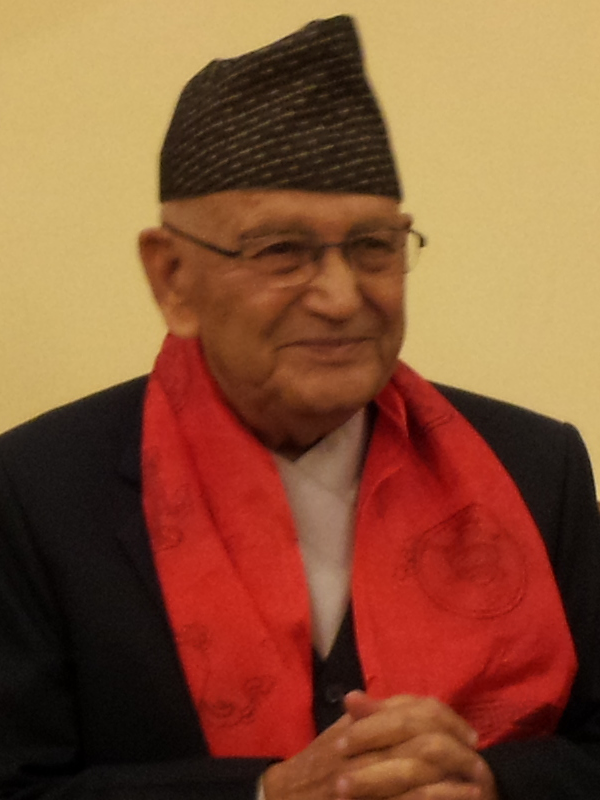
	First party	Second party	Third party
Leader	Man Mohan Adhikari	Girija Prasad Koirala	Surya Bahadur Thapa
Party	CPN (UML)	Congress	RPP
Last election	69	110	4
Seats won	88	83	20
Seat change	▲19	▼27	▲16
Popular vote	2,352,601	2,545,287	1,367,148
Percentage	31.86%	34.47%	18.51%
Swing	▲2.59pp	▼5.03pp	▲6.01pp
- Results by constituency
Prime Minister before election
Girija Prasad Koirala
Congress
Prime Minister after election
Man Mohan Adhikari
CPN (UML)

General elections were held in Nepal on 15 November 1994 to elect the House of Representatives. The election took place after the Nepali Congress government collapsed and King Birenda called new elections. The results showed that the Communist Party of Nepal (Unified Marxist-Leninist) won the most seats in the House of Representatives and Man Mohan Adhikari became Prime Minister at the head of a minority government.

== Background ==
King Birenda agreed to introduce democracy in 1990 and to become a constitutional monarch after increasing protests by the 1990 People's Movement. The 1991 multi-party elections saw the Nepali Congress party win a majority with 112 of the 205 seats. Girija Prasad Koirala was chosen by the Nepali Congress as their leader in parliament and was appointed Prime Minister.

By 1994 the economic situation in Nepal had worsened and the opposition accused the government of being corrupt. Divisions had also arisen within the Nepali Congress after Prime Minister Koirala was accused of helping to ensure that the president of the Nepali Congress, Krishna Prasad Bhattarai, was defeated in a by-election in February 1994. These divisions led to 36 Nepali Congress members of parliament abstaining from a parliamentary vote in July 1994 leading to the government losing the vote. As a result, Koirala offered his resignation as Prime Minister and King Birenda dissolved parliament with new elections called for 13 November. Koirala stayed on as caretaker Prime Minister until the election.

== Campaign ==
The election saw 1,500 candidates spread over 24 parties competing for the 205 seats in the House of Representatives. The leading two parties in the election were the governing Nepali Congress and the main opposition party, the Communist Party of Nepal (Unified Marxist-Leninist). The Nepali Congress called on voters to stick with their party and not to entrust power to a Communist party they accused of being irresponsible.

The Communist party called for land reform to break up large landholdings and give land to landless Nepalese peasants. Other pledges made by the party included running water and electricity for all voters and for each village to have at least one television. While the party called for foreign investment to be somewhat restricted and for privatisations to be limited, they also stressed that they believed in a mixed economy and did not support nationalisation. They accused the Nepali Congress government of having been incompetent and corrupt and said that a change in government was required.

On election day itself there was some violence resulting in one death and another 15 people being injured. 124 international election monitors observed the election and new polls were ordered in 31 constituencies where violence had occurred.

== Results ==
The results saw the Nepali Congress party lose their majority in parliament and the Communist party became the largest group in the House. However no party won the 103 seats required for a majority on their own. The pro-monarchy party, the Rastriya Prajatantra Party, made significant gains winning 20 seats up from the 4 they had won in the previous election. Voter turnout was 58% a decline from 60% of those who had voted in the previous election in 1991.

Party	Votes	%	Seats	+/–
Nepali Congress	2,545,287	34.47	83	–27
Communist Party of Nepal (Unified Marxist–Leninist)	2,352,601	31.86	88	+19
Rastriya Prajatantra Party	1,367,148	18.51	20	+16
Nepal Sadbhavana Party	265,847	3.60	3	–3
United People's Front of Nepal	100,285	1.36	0	–9
Rastriya Janamukti Party	79,996	1.08	0	0
Nepal Workers Peasants Party	75,072	1.02	4	+2
Nepal Janabadi Morcha	32,732	0.44	0	New
Communist Party of Nepal (Marxist)	29,571	0.40	0	New
Communist Party of Nepal (United)	29,273	0.40	0	New
Nepali Congress (Bisheswar) Party	12,571	0.17	0	New
Rashtriya Janata Parishad	8,931	0.12	0	New
Janabadi Morcha (Nepal)	3,681	0.05	0	0
Prajatantrik Lok Dal	3,082	0.04	0	New
Nepal Praja Parishad	1,832	0.02	0	New
Rashtriya Janata Party	1,525	0.02	0	0
United Peoples Party	1,346	0.02	0	New
Nepali Congress (B.P.)	840	0.01	0	New
Nepali Congress (Subarna)	484	0.01	0	New
Janata Dal (Samajbadi Prajatantrik)	404	0.01	0	0
Samyukta Prajatantra Party	218	0.00	0	New
Nepal Janahit Party	156	0.00	0	New
Radical Nepali Congress	53	0.00	0	New
Liberal Democratic Party	18	0.00	0	New
Independents	471,324	6.38	7	+4
Total	7,384,277	100.00	205	0
Valid votes	7,384,277	96.84		
Invalid/blank votes	241,071	3.16		
Total votes	7,625,348	100.00		
Registered voters/turnout	12,327,329	61.86		
Source: Nohlen et al., Nepal Research

== Aftermath ==
Following the election the Communist party elected Man Mohan Adhikari as leader of the party in parliament and he attempted to form a minority government. King Birendra asked both the Communists and the Nepali Congress party to explain to him why they should be allowed to form the government and then he would make a decision on who should be appointed Prime Minister. The Nepali Congress attempted to form a deal with smaller parties including the Rastriya Prajatantra Party in order to try to stay in power. However this was unsuccessful and Adhikari became Prime Minister at the head of a minority Communist government. They therefore became the first elected communist government in a constitutional monarchy anywhere in the world and the first communist government in Asia to come into power democratically.

== See also ==
- Adhikari cabinet, 1994
- 3rd House of Representatives (Nepal)
