= Nepal Workers' and Peasants' Party =

Political party in Nepal

Nepal Workers' and Peasants' Party नेपाल मजदुर किसान पार्टी
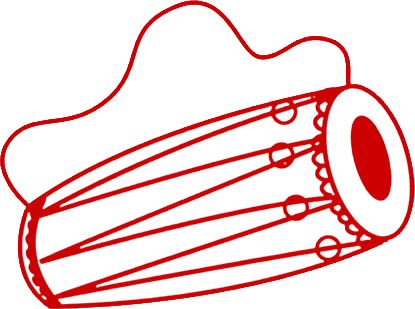
- Abbreviation: NWPP (English) नेमकिपा (Nepali)
- President: Narayan Man Bijukchhe
- Secretary: Prem Suwal
- Treasurer: Mohan Prasad Prajapati
- Founder: Narayan Man Bijukchhe
- Founded: 23 January 1975 (51 years ago)
- Split from: CPN (Pushpa Lal)
- Headquarters: Golmadhi, Bhaktapur
- Newspaper: Majdoor
- Student wing: Nepal Revolutionary Students' Union
- Youth wing: Nepal Revolutionary Youths' Union
- Women's wing: Nepal Revolutionary Women's Union
- Peasants' wing: Nepal Revolutionary Peasants' Union
- Cultural wing: Nepal Revolutionary Culturals' Union
- Teachers' wing: Nepal Revolutionary Teachers' Union
- Workers' wing: Nepal Revolutionary Workers' Union
- Ideology: Communism; Marxism–Leninism; Mao Zedong Thought; Juche (since 2016); Nationalism (since 2016)
- Political position: Far-left
- Colours
- ECN Status: Provincial Party
- Pratinidhi Sabha: 0 / 275
- Seats in National Assembly: 0 / 59
- Provincial Assembly of Bagmati Province: 3 / 110
- Mayors/Chairs: 1 / 753
- Councillors: 85 / 35,011

Election symbol

Party flag
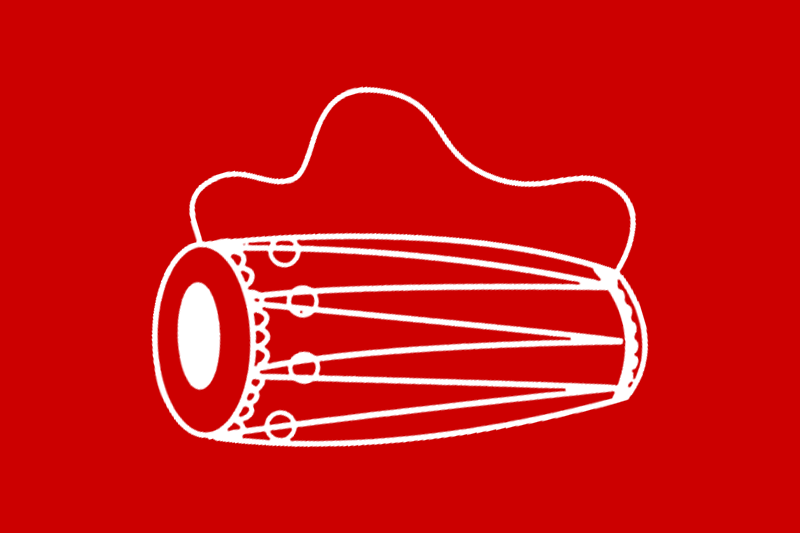

Website
- nwpp.org.np

The Nepal Workers' and Peasants' Party (NWPP), also known as the Nepal Majdoor Kisan Party (Nepali: नेपाल मजदुर किसान पार्टी; abbr. नेमकिपा, Nemakipa), is a Marxist-Leninist political party in Nepal. The party was founded on 23 January 1975 by Narayan Man Bijukchhe and draws most of its support from Bhaktapur. The party is sympathetic to the Workers' Party of Korea and has declared Juche to be a "directional ideology".

== History ==
=== Foundation and early years (1975–1981) ===
The Nepal Workers' and Peasants' Party was founded as the Nepal Workers and Peasants Organization (NPWO) in Nepal on 23 January 1975. The NPWO broke away from the Communist Party of Nepal (Pushpa Lal) in protest over Pushpa Lal Shrestha's support for Indian intervention in East Pakistan, together with the Proletarian Revolutionary Organisation, Nepal, and the Mazdoor Kisan Sangram Samiti. In 1981, the NWPO split, and two separate parties came into existence. One party was led by Narayan Man Bijukchhe, which later became the Nepal Workers' and Peasants' Party and the other was led by Hareram Sharma.

=== Jana Andholan I and II (1990–2007) ===
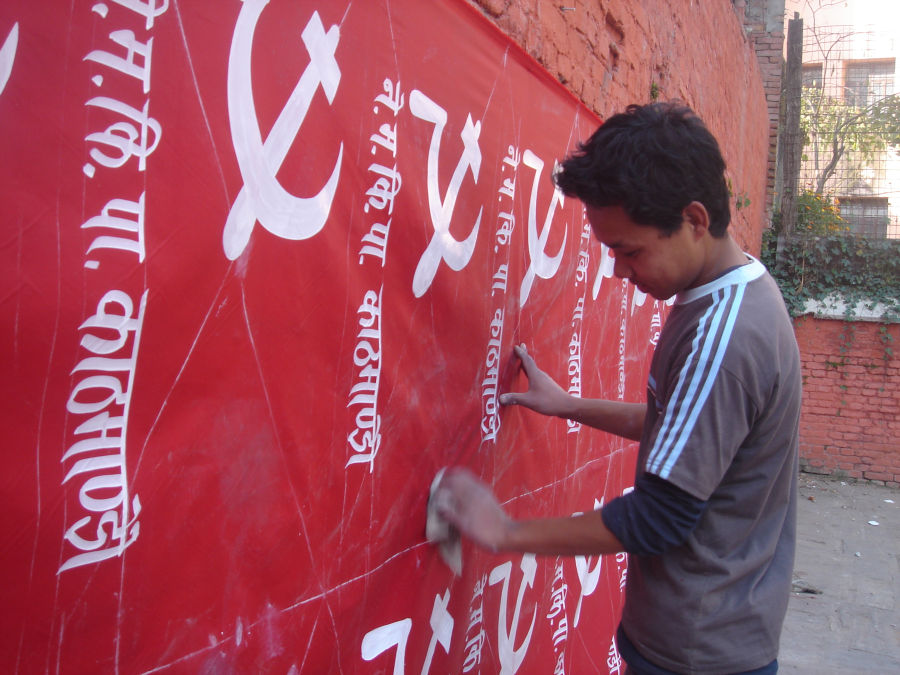
A party supporter postering for the Nepal Workers Peasants Party at a hiti (public fountain) in Thamel

Bijukchhe's NWPO formed part of the United Left Front and took part in the 1990 Jana Andolan uprising. It participated in the formation of the Samyukta Janamorcha Nepal but left shortly before the 1991 election. The group changed its name to the Nepal Workers' and Peasants' Party and contested the election separately. It fielded 30 candidates, out of whom two were elected. The party received a total of 91,335 votes, or 1.25%.

Ahead of the 1992 elections to local bodies, the NWPP formed an electoral coalition with the Samyukta Janamorcha Nepal, Communist Party of Nepal (Marxist-Leninist-Maoist), Communist Party of Nepal (Marxist), and Nepal Communist League.

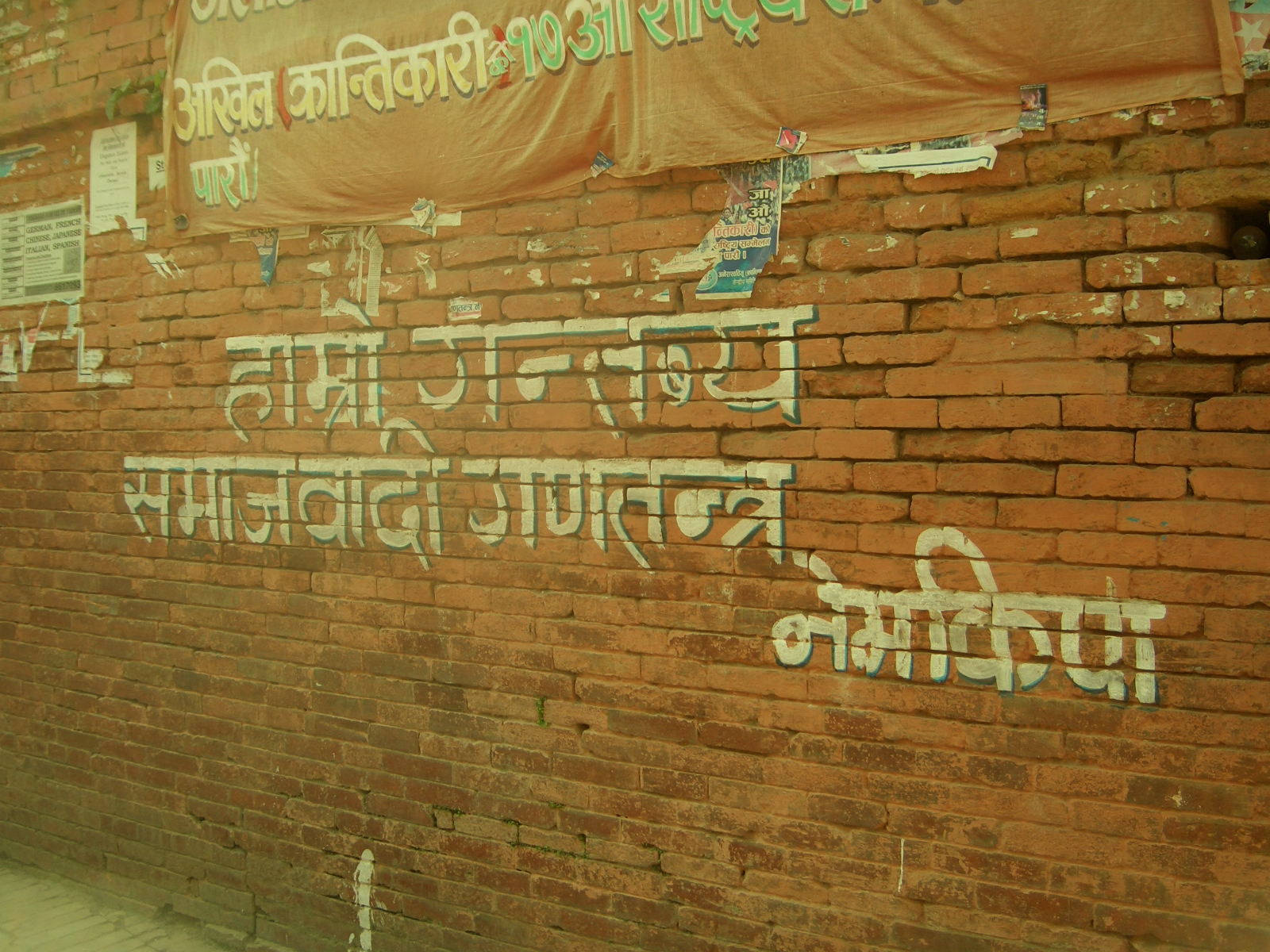
Party mural in Bhaktapur; the Nepali text reads: "Our destination is a Socialist Republic".

NWPP was active in the protest movements against repression in Nepal and is a member of the Seven Party Alliance which spearheaded the 2006 Loktantra Andolan. After the restoration of a democratic system, the party decided not to join the government, but stayed in the Seven Party Alliance, which later converted into the Eight Party Alliance. When the interim legislature was formed in January 2007, Bijukchhe was joined by three other nominated MPs.

=== Constituent Assembly and Federal Nepal (2008–present) ===
The party contested the 2008 Constituent Assembly elections and won four seats to the Constituent Assembly. The party also had one nominated member. In the 2013 Constituent Assembly elections, the party again won four seats. The party voted for Khadga Prasad Oli in the prime minister election on 12 October 2015.

In the 2017 local elections, the party won 99 seats across local governments and won one mayoral position, with Sunil Prajapati being elected as the mayor of Bhaktapur Municipality. The party also contested the 2017 legislative and provincial elections, winning one seat in the House of Representatives and two seats to the Provincial Assembly of Province No. 3.

== Ideology ==
The Nepal Workers' and Peasants' Party is a communist party, with the party taking major inspiration from the Chinese Mao Zedong Thought ideology. The guiding economic principle of the party is scientific socialism.

In recent years, the party has incorporated the Juche idea as a guiding principle. After visiting North Korea, party leader Narayan Man Bijukchhe has attempted to implement the governing policies of Juche into the city of Bhaktapur. Portraits of the Kim family can be found at the party headquarters in Bhaktapur. The party sees political independence and economic self-sufficiency as the cornerstones of development. The party also sees India as an imperialist force working against Nepalese interests.

== Student wing ==
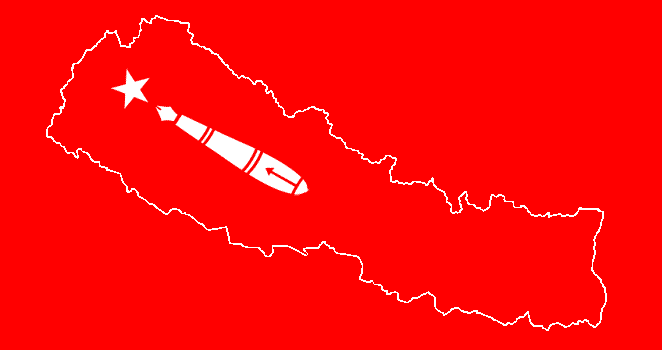
Flag of the Nepalese Revolutionary Students Union

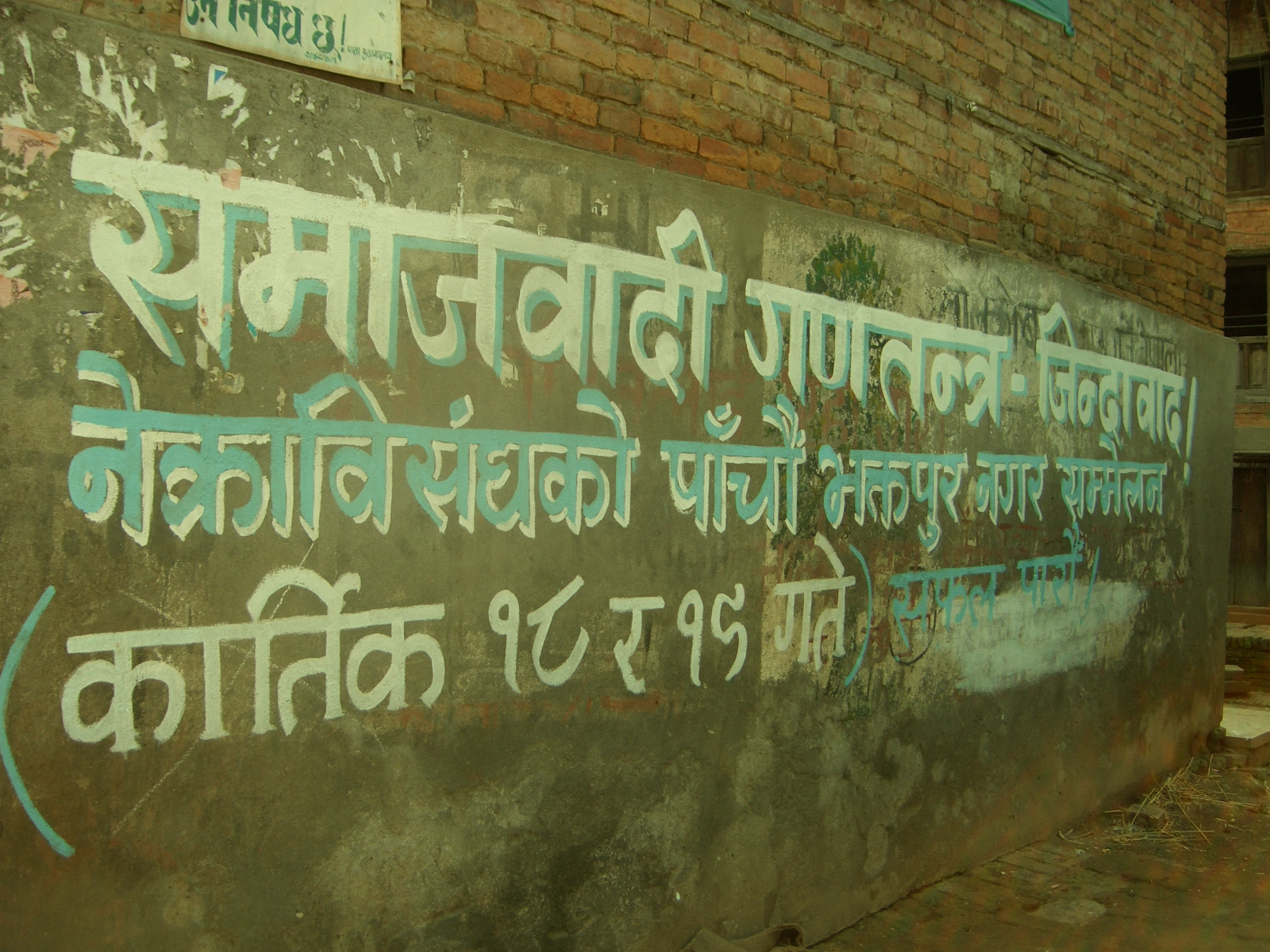
An NRSU mural in Bhaktapur, announcing the 5th Bhaktapur City Conference of the NRSU. The text reads, "Long live the socialist republic".

The Nepal Revolutionary Students Union (Nepali: नेपाल क्रान्तिकारी विद्यार्थी संघ; abbr. NRSU and नेक्राविसंघ) is the party's student wing.

== Members of Parliament ==
List of Pratinidhi Sabha members from Nepal Majdoor Kishan Party

No.	Name	Constituency	Appointment date	Retirement date
1.	Prem Suwal	Bhaktapur 1	2022	2027

== Electoral performance ==
=== Legislative elections ===
Election	Leader	Constituency votes			Party list votes			Seats		Position	Status
Election	Leader	No.	%	% change	No.	%	% change	No.	+/–	Position	Status
1991	Narayan Man Bijukchhe	91,335	1.25					2 / 205		8th	In opposition
1994	Narayan Man Bijukchhe	75,072	0.98	▼0.27				4 / 205	▲2	▲7th	In opposition
1999	Narayan Man Bijukchhe	48,015	0.56	▼0.42				1 / 205	▼3	▼10th	In opposition
2008	Narayan Man Bijukchhe	65,908	0.64	▲0.08	74,089	0.69		4 / 575	▲3	▼14th	In opposition
2013	Narayan Man Bijukchhe	54,323	0.60	▼0.04	66,778	0.71	▲0.02	4 / 575	Steady	▼15th	In opposition
2017	Narayan Man Bijukchhe	52,668	0.52	▼0.08	56,141	0.59 (Note: Represented as Independent for not reaching the 3% threshold)	▼0.12	1 / 275	▼3	▲11th	In opposition
2022	Narayan Man Bijukchhe	71,567	0.68	▲0.16	75,168	0.71	▲0.12	1 / 275	Steady	11th	In opposition
2026	Narayan Man Bijukchhe	41,018	0.39	▼0.29	42,299	0.39	▼0.32	0 / 275	▼1	11th	Extra parliamentary

=== Provincial elections ===
==== Bagmati ====
Election Year	Party list votes			Seats		Position	Resulting government
Election Year	No.	%	+/–	No.	+/–	Position	Resulting government
2017	41,610	2.20		2 / 110		5th	In opposition
2022	68,796	3.55	▲1.35	3 / 110	▲1	▼6th	In opposition
