= 2026 Nepalese general election =

2026 election for members of the House of Representatives

- 5 March 2026

All 275 seats in the House of Representatives 138 seats needed for a majority
- Registered: 18,903,689 (▲5.09%)
- Turnout: 59.08% (▼2.77 pp; FPTP votes); 59.67% (▼1.74 pp; PR votes)
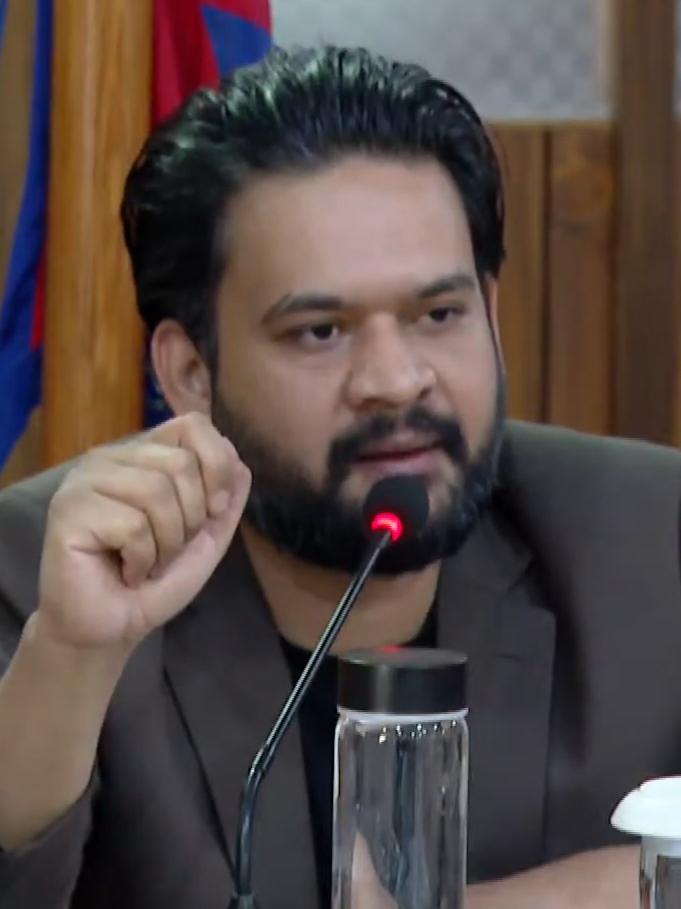

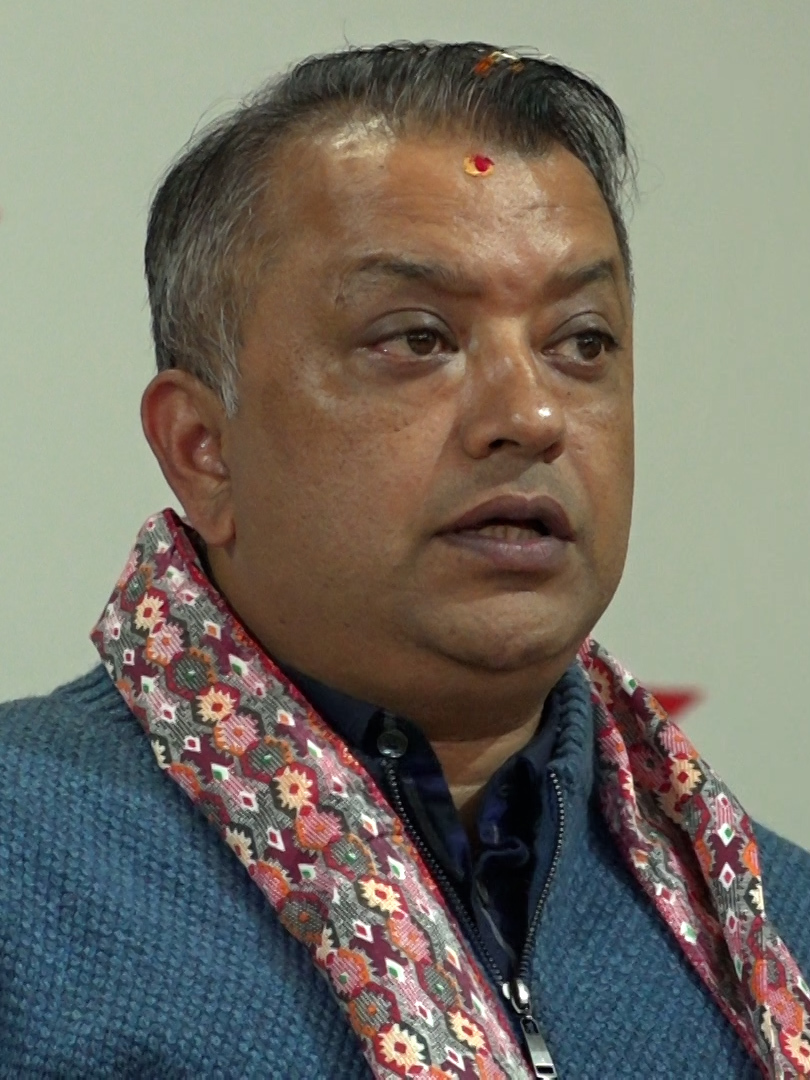

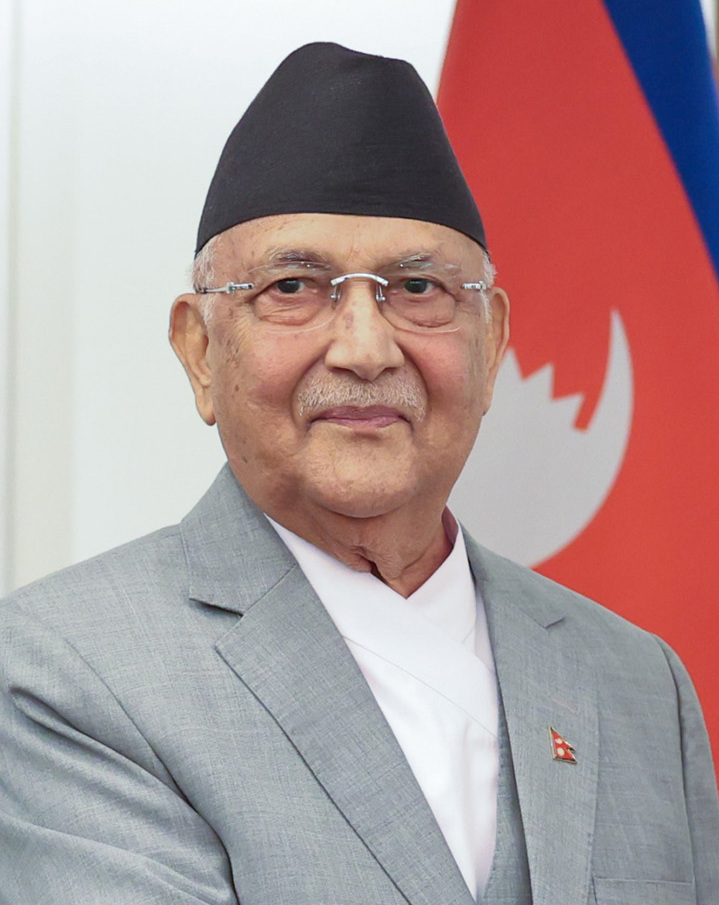

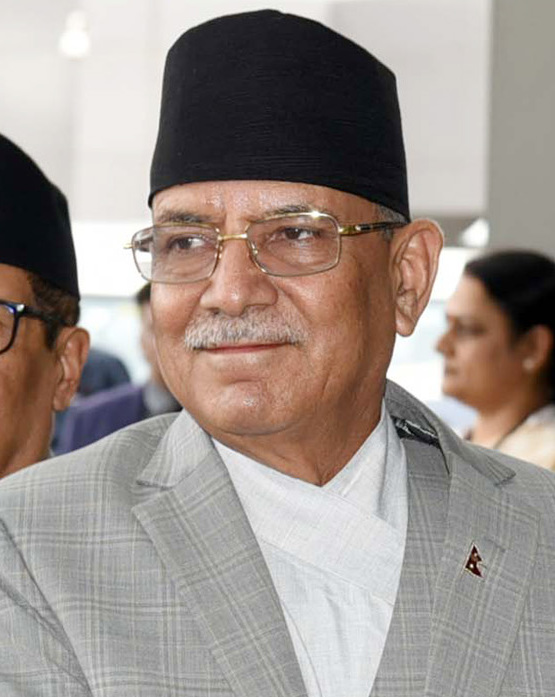

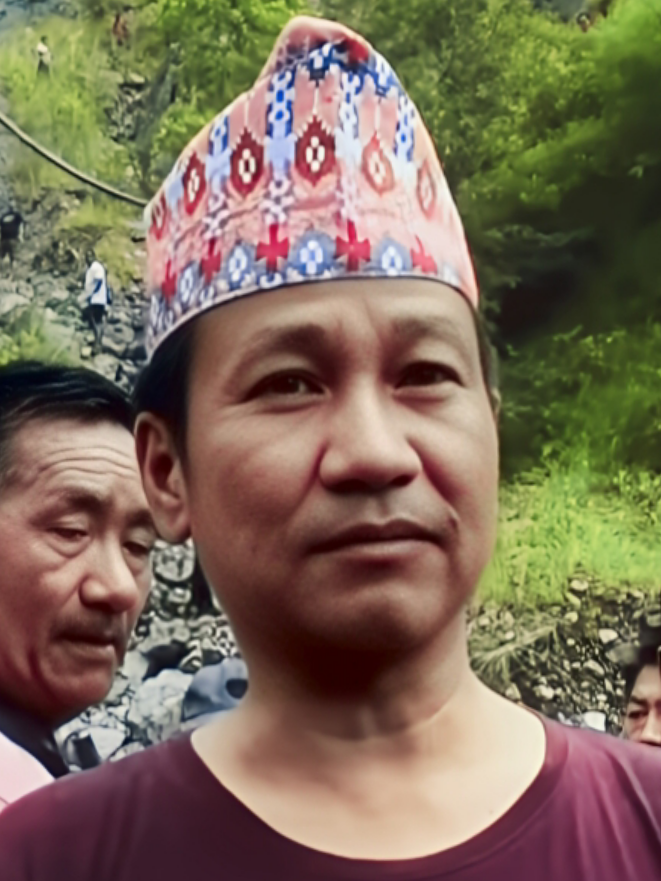

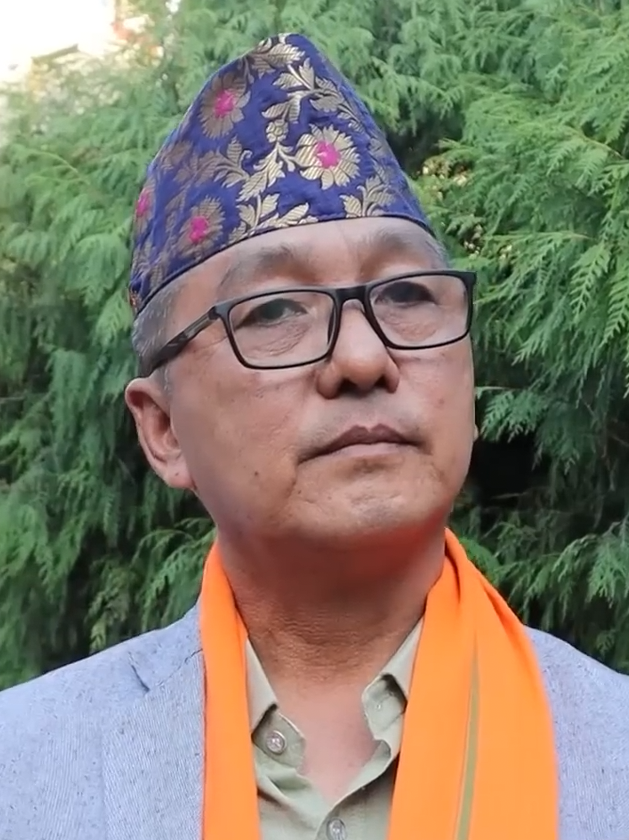
	First party	Second party	Third party
Leader	Balen Shah	Gagan Thapa	K. P. Sharma Oli
Party	RSP	Congress	CPN (UML)
Leader since	28 December 2025 (Note: Rabi Lamichhane leads the Rastriya Swatantra Party, while Balen Shah is the party's candidate for Prime Minister of Nepal and joined the party as Senior Leader on 28 December 2025.)	16 January 2026	8 March 2021
Leader's seat	Jhapa 5	Sarlahi 4 (lost)	Jhapa 5 (lost re-election)
Last election	10.70%, 20 seats	25.71%, 89 seats	26.95%, 78 seats
Seats won	182	38	25
Seat change	▲162	▼51	▼53
Constituency vote	4,650,697	2,008,639	1,623,159
% and swing	44.17% (▲36.40 pp)	19.08% (▼4.11 pp)	15.42% (▼15.41 pp)
Proportional vote	5,183,493	1,759,172	1,455,885
% and swing	47.84% (▲37.14 pp)	16.24% (▼9.47 pp)	13.44% (▼13.51 pp)
	Fourth party	Fifth party	Sixth party
Leader	Pushpa Kamal Dahal	Harka Sampang	Rajendra Lingden
Party	NCP	SSP	RPP
Leader since	5 November 2025	November 2025	December 2021
Leader's seat	Eastern Rukum 1	Sunsari 1	Jhapa 3 (lost re-election)
Last election	16.53%, 45 seats (Note: 11.13%, 32 seats Maoist Centre 2.83%, 10 seats Unified Socialist 2.57%, 3 seats NUP)	New	5.58%, 14 seats
Seats won	17	7	5
Seat change	▼28	New	▼9
Constituency vote	976,016	303,902	207,270
% and swing	9.27% (▼5.90 pp)	2.89% (New)	1.97% (▼3.27 pp)
Proportional vote	811,577	385,856	330,684
% and swing	7.49% (▼9.04 pp)	3.56% (New)	3.05% (▼2.53 pp)
- Results by constituency
Prime Minister before election
Sushila Karki (interim)
Independent
Prime Minister after election
Balen Shah
RSP

Early general elections were held in Nepal on 5 March 2026 to elect the 275 members of the House of Representatives as announced on 12 September 2025 by the President of Nepal, on the recommendation of the government of Nepal. The election was called after youth protests in September 2025 led to the resignation of Prime Minister K. P. Sharma Oli. The Rastriya Swatantra Party, led by Rabi Lamichhane with Balen Shah as their candidate for prime minister, won a landslide victory, gaining a majority in the House of Representatives without the need for a coalition for the first time since 1999.

Voters cast in two separate ballots in the election: one to elect 165 members from single-member constituencies via FPTP, and the other to elect the remaining 110 members from a single nationwide constituency via party-list proportional representation, as mentioned in article 84 of the Constitution of Nepal. Over 18.9 million people were registered to vote in the election. More than 3,400 candidates from 68 parties contested the election.

The Rastriya Swatantra Party secured 182 seats, an almost supermajority, and the second-best showing in Nepal's electoral history, only surpassed by the Nepali Congress in the 1959 elections. The party's proportional vote share of 47.8% was the highest recorded since the system was introduced in 2008.

The Nepali Congress suffered their worst-ever electoral defeat, winning 38 seats with 19.1% of the proportional vote, party president Gagan Thapa being among those who lost their seat.

The two major leftist parties, CPN (UML) and Nepali Communist Party, placed third and fourth respectively. CPN (UML) faced their worst-ever election result, winning 25 seats with 13.4% of the proportional vote with party chairman and former prime minister K .P. Sharma Oli also losing his constituency. The Nepali Communist Party, led by Pushpa Kamal Dahal, won 17 seats and 7.5% of the vote, but party co-cordinator and former prime minister Madhav Kumar Nepal lost his seat.

The Shram Sanskriti Party, led by Harka Sampang, qualified as a national party with seven seats and 3.56% of the votes. The Rastriya Prajatantra Party, led by Rajendra Lingden, won five seats and 3.05% of the vote.

== Background ==
The 2026 general election was precipitated by a period of acute socio-economic instability and a total breakdown of trust between the state and Nepal's youth. By mid-2025, public frustration reached a zenith over rampant corruption, high youth unemployment, and the perceived nepotism of the political elite, often criticized through the viral "#NepoKid" and "#NepoBabies" social media trends. This discontent was further exacerbated by a stagnant economy and a record-breaking "brain drain", as thousands of skilled workers migrated daily for employment abroad, contrasting sharply with the opulent lifestyles of politicians' families displayed on digital platforms.

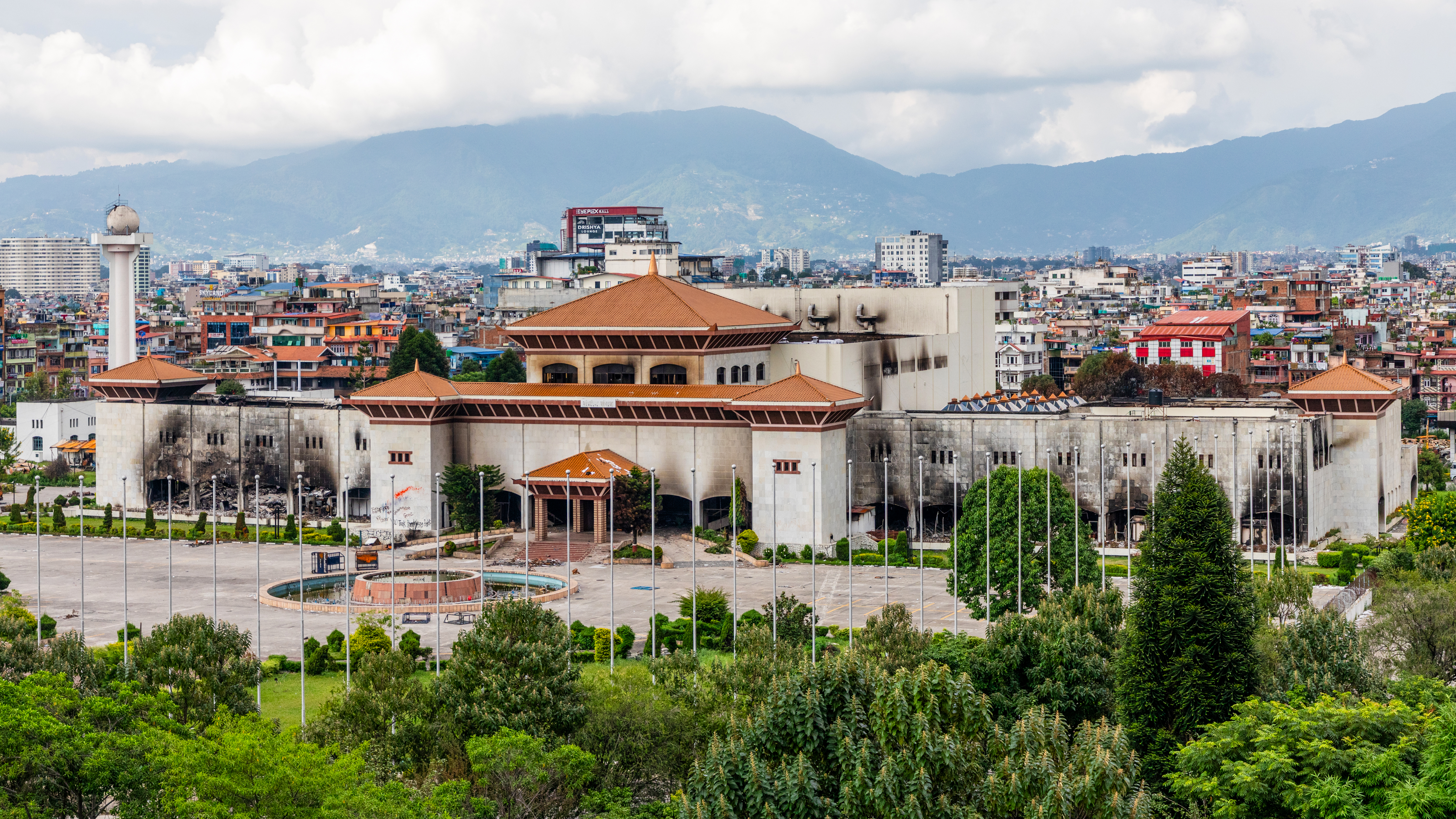
International Convention Centre that housed the Federal Parliament after 2025 Nepalese Gen Z protests.

The immediate catalyst for the unrest was the government's decision on 4 September 2025 to ban 26 social media platforms, including YouTube, Facebook, and WhatsApp, citing their failure to register under new, restrictive digital guidelines. This digital blackout was widely perceived as an attempt to stifle dissent and dismantle communication networks used by activists. In response, a leaderless movement predominantly organized by Generation Z students erupted on 8 September 2025. Thousands of protesters, many in school uniforms, converged at Maitighar Mandala and marched toward the Federal Parliament Building, demanding an end to the ban and the resignation of the government.

The situation escalated into what local media termed a "Day of Rage" when security forces used live ammunition to quell the crowds. By 9 September, at least 76 people had been killed and over 2,000 injured as protesters set fire to several government structures, including the Prime Minister's Office at Singha Durbar and the residences of high-ranking officials. Amidst the total collapse of civilian governance and mass resignations within his cabinet, Prime Minister K. P. Sharma Oli resigned on 9 September 2025. The following days saw the military assume control of security in the Kathmandu Valley to stabilize the region after the Prime Minister and several other senior leaders were evacuated from their residences.

On 12 September 2025, President Ram Chandra Paudel dissolved the 6th House of Representatives to pave the way for a fresh mandate. Invoking Article 61 of the Constitution to safeguard national unity during the crisis, the President appointed former Chief Justice Sushila Karki as the interim Prime Minister. Karki, known for her record of judicial independence, became the first woman to lead a government in Nepal's history. Her interim administration was tasked exclusively with stabilizing the country and conducting free and fair elections within a six-month window, a mandate she reaffirmed by appointing a cabinet consisting largely of technocrats and civil society leaders.

Following the constitutional reset, the President announced that the general election for the 275 seats of the House of Representatives would take place on 5 March 2026. Crucially, this snap poll was limited to the federal lower house; there were no concurrent elections for the Provincial Assemblies, as those bodies were not dissolved during the September crisis. The election period saw a massive surge in voter registration, with nearly 19 million citizens eligible, including over 800,000 first-time voters from the generation that led the September protests. The 5 March date was selected to provide sufficient time for the reconstruction of damaged state infrastructure and the restoration of public services disrupted during the uprising.

== Timetable ==
The electoral timeline for the 7th House of Representatives election was established under a condensed "fast-track" schedule to transition from the interim administration of Sushila Karki back to a fully elected civilian government. Following the formal dissolution of the 6th House of Representatives on 12 September 2025, the Election Commission of Nepal (ECN) was mandated to execute all logistical and legal requirements for a nationwide poll within a 150-day window. This period was marked by high administrative pressure to update voter rolls that had been disrupted by the September unrest.

The initial phase focused on voter and party registration, which saw an unprecedented surge in activity. Following multiple requests from the interim Prime Minister to ensure no citizen was disenfranchised, the ECN extended the registration deadline to 21 November 2025. This extension facilitated the registration of approximately 800,000 first-time voters, predominantly from the "Gen Z" demographic. By the party registration deadline on 26 November, a record 143 political parties had applied for recognition, reflecting the fragmentation and emergence of new political forces in the wake of the protests.

The Proportional Representation (PR) process began in late December 2025, requiring parties to submit preliminary closed lists that adhered to strict constitutional quotas for gender, ethnicity, and regional representation. The ECN allocated 110 of the 275 seats through this system to ensure the inclusivity of marginalized groups, including Dalits, Janajatis, and Madhesis. This phase was critical for the "new wave" parties, which sought to maximize their parliamentary presence through the PR ballot, given the high barrier of entry in direct First-Past-The-Post (FPTP) contests.

On 19 January 2026, the ECN enforced a rigorous Election Code of Conduct, which prohibited the use of government resources for campaigning, restricted the size of political banners, and banned the use of children in rallies. The following day, candidate nominations for the 165 FPTP seats were filed nationwide, with over 3,400 candidates entering the fray. The security environment during this period was managed by a combined force of 320,000 personnel from the Nepal Police, Armed Police Force, and the Nepal Army to prevent a resurgence of the violence seen in late 2025.

The final month of the timetable was dedicated to an intensive two-week campaign period, which concluded with a "silence period" beginning 48 hours before the polls. Election day on 5 March 2026 saw nearly 19 million eligible voters head to the polls across 165 constituencies. Unlike the 2022 cycle, these elections were conducted solely for the federal House of Representatives; provincial assembly elections were deferred as those bodies remained intact through the 2025 crisis.

The key dates are listed below:

Date	Event
12 September 2025	6th House of Representatives dissolved
12 September 2025	Cabinet announces election date
21 November 2025	Last date to register to be on electoral roll
26 November 2025	Last day for party registration at Election Commission
28–29 December 2025	Parties submit preliminary closed list for proportional representation
19 January 2026	Election code of conduct starts
20 January 2026	Candidate nomination for first past the post
23 January 2026	Candidate list for first past the post finalized and published
3 February 2026	Closed list for proportional representation finalized and published
5 March 2026	Election day

== Electoral system ==
The 275 members of the legislature are elected by two methods; 165 are elected from single-member constituencies by first-past-the-post voting and 110 seats are elected by closed list proportional representation from a single nationwide constituency. Voters receive separate ballot papers for the two methods. A party or electoral alliance has to pass the election threshold of 3% of the overall valid vote to be allocated a seat in the proportional vote. Nepal uses the Webster method to allocate proportional seats.

Voting is limited to Nepali citizens aged 18 or over of sound mind and not having been declared ineligible under federal election fraud and punishment laws. On 27 December 2025, the Election Commission published a final voter list of 18,903,689 voters.

=== Eligibility to vote ===
To vote in the general election, one must be:

- On the electoral roll
- Aged 18 or over on 3 March
- A citizen of Nepal
- Of sound mind
- Not ineligible as per federal election fraud and punishment laws

== Pre-election arrangement ==
Party	Parliamentary Party Leader	2022 results		At dissolution
Party	Parliamentary Party Leader	PR Votes (%)	Seats	At dissolution
Nepali Congress	Sher Bahadur Deuba	25.71	89 / 275	88 / 275
CPN (UML)	K. P. Sharma Oli	26.95	78 / 275	75 / 275
Maoist Centre	Pushpa Kamal Dahal	11.13	32 / 275	32 / 275
Rastriya Swatantra Party	Rabi Lamichhane	10.70	20 / 275	21 / 275
Rastriya Prajatantra Party	Rajendra Prasad Lingden	5.58	14 / 275	13 / 275
People's Socialist Party	Ashok Rai	—N/a	—N/a	7 / 275
Janamat Party	C. K. Raut	3.74	6 / 275	6 / 275
People's Socialist Party, Nepal	Upendra Yadav	3.99	12 / 275	5 / 275
Unified Socialist	Madhav Kumar Nepal	2.83	10 / 275	10 / 275
Nagarik Unmukti Party	Ranjeeta Shrestha	2.57	3 / 275	4 / 275
Loktantrik Samajwadi	Mahantha Thakur	1.58	4 / 275	4 / 275
Nepal Workers Peasants Party	Prem Suwal	0.71	1 / 275	1 / 275
Rastriya Janamorcha	Chitra Bahadur K.C.	0.44	1 / 275	1 / 275
Aam Janata Party	Prabhu Sah	—N/a	—N/a	1 / 275
Independent	—N/a	—N/a	5 / 275	2 / 275
Vacant	—N/a	—N/a	—N/a	1 / 275

== Campaign ==
=== Nepali Congress ===
After months of disagreement on electing a new leadership before the election, a majority of party delegates held a special general convention which elected Gagan Thapa as party president. Thapa was also announced as a prime ministerial candidate from the party. The party fielded candidates in all 165 constituencies, Thapa decided to contest the election from Sarlahi 4 instead of Kathmandu 4 where he had won in the last three elections. Ex-party president and former prime minister Sher Bahadur Deuba, acting president Purna Bahadur Khadka, and Ramesh Lekhak who had been home minister during the Gen Z protests did not contest the election.

The party's campaign focused on the new generation taking over the leadership of the party and their image as a "renewed" party. The party started its campaign rally from Janakpur on 18 February 2026. It conducted major campaign rallies in major cities of Surkhet, Banke, Butwal, Pokhara, Birgunj and Baglung.

The party's manifesto called for structural reform centered on good governance, administrative efficiency, and strict term limits. It proposed a one-term limit for the President, two terms for the prime minister and chief ministers, three for ministers, and a single term for party list MPs. It also called for the introduction of right to reject and right to recall provisions. The economic platform focused on liberal, pro-market policies that includes a stable tax system, incentives for private sector investment, tax exemptions for income up to NPR 1,000,000, and commercialization of agriculture. The manifesto made commitments for a contribution-based social security system, universal healthcare, and free education through the secondary level. The party also outlined plans to reform the public works budding process for greater transparency, expansion of hydropower and prioritization of national electrification.

=== CPN (UML) ===
The party held its 11th general convention on 18 December 2025 and reelected K. P. Sharma Oli as party chairman. Oli was also declared as a candidate for prime minister from the party. The party fielded candidates in all 165 constituencies, but later withdrew from Manang 1 in favor of Nepali Congress candidate Tek Bahadur Gurung after local elders intervened in order to prevent violence during campaigning. In return Nepali Congress would have to support CPN (UML) candidates in the next provincial elections.

The party agreed to informally support Pragatisheel Loktantrik Party candidate Janardan Sharma in Western Rukum 1 in exchange for support in most constituencies in Karnali, but did not withdraw their own candidates.

K. P. Sharma Oli was prime minister during the Gen Z protests and called the elections a referendum between nation-builders and nation-destroyers.

The party's manifesto promised a welfare system with comprehensive social security nets. The party proposed giving 10 GB of free monthly internet data for individuals aged 18–28, a $10,000 card to facilitate foreign business and interest-free higher education loans of up to NPR 2 million. The economic platform positioned the private sector as the primary driver of national growth and promised a progressive taxation system and modernization of agriculture. The party proposed forgiveness of loans up to NPR 25,000 taken before September 2025, universal healthcare, free education and free school lunches until the 10th grade. The manifesto also proposed increasing the monthly minimum wage to NPR 25,000, offering a monthly NPR 5,000 incentive for migrant workers that sent back remittances, and integrating migrant workers into a contribution-based social security system. It proposed a maternal allowance of NPR 20,000 alongside NPR 500,000 in free life insurance for pregnant women.

=== Nepali Communist Party ===
The party was formed from the merger of CPN (Maoist Centre), CPN (Unified Socialist) and eight other left-wing groups. Former deputy prime minister Bhim Rawal, Nagarik Unmukti Party and a faction of People's Socialist Party also joined the party.

The party and Rastriya Janamorcha made an alliance for Baglung district. As part of the alliance, the party supported Janamorcha candidate Krishna Adhikari in Baglung 1, and in return, Janamorcha supported NCP candidate Gyamnath Gaire in Baglung 2. Senior leaders from the party, former prime minister Jhala Nath Khanal and former deputy prime minister Bam Dev Gautam decided not to contest the election.

The party unveiled its manifesto on 10 February, which focused on good governance, employment creation, social welfare, and institutional reform. The manifesto emphasized investment in agriculture and hydropower, policies promoting proportional representation and targeted programs for marginalized communities, strengthening the federal democratic republican system through enactment of laws related to federalism, including a federal civil service act and police act, and allocating 60 percent of the national budget to provincial and local governments. It proposed the implementation of universal health coverage, introduction of an unemployment insurance system, mandatory enrollment in a contribution-based social security fund, and six months of maternity leave for salaried women for up to two children. The manifesto also called for a high-level commission to investigate the assets of all public office holders and committed to completing the peace process.

=== Rastriya Swatantra Party ===
The party signed an agreement to bring in independent Kathmandu mayor Balendra Shah and declared him as its candidate for prime minister. An agreement had also been signed to merge Ujyaalo Nepal Party into the party, but the agreement later collapsed. Bibeksheel Sajha Party merged into the party ahead of the election. Shah decided to contest the election from Jhapa 5 against CPN (UML) chairman and former prime minister K. P. Sharma Oli.

The party's campaign launched with Balen Shah formally joining the party and greeting supporters at a gathering in Janakpur on 20 January. Shah was put forward as the first prime minister from Madhesh. The party started its campaign rally from Dhangadhi on 18 February 2026. The next day the party released its manifesto at a rally in Birendranagar The party's candidacy from Dhanusha 1 was scrapped by election commission on 3 March 2026 just two days before election after candidate Kishori Sah was found in blacklist.

The party's manifesto advocated for constitutional amendments and institutional reforms aimed at streamlining the bureaucracy. The party proposed a transition to a directly elected executive and a fully proportional parliament, alongside separation of powers that would prevent legislators from serving as cabinet members. The party proposed abolition of party-affiliated student unions, trade unions, and civil servant associations. It also aimed to restructure provincial governments and create non-partisan local governments. The party's liberal economic policy advocated for the creation of a competition regulator, proposed a unification of existing economic laws, tax cuts for businesses, and a formal review of Nepali rupee's peg to the Indian rupee. The manifesto also committed to expand hydropower, enforcement of national engineering and building standards, and implementation of a unified healthcare system. The party also supported dual citizenship rights and investigation into wealth of all public officials holding office since 1990.

=== Rastriya Prajatantra Party ===
The party unified with Rastriya Prajatantra Party Nepal to strengthen the pro-monarchy vote before the election. The party fielded candidates in all 165 constituencies, but withdrew its candidate from Manang 1 in favor of Nepali Congress candidate Tek Bahadur Gurung after local elders intervened in order to prevent violence during campaigning, and from Rupandehi 2.

The party's manifesto called for a return to a constitutional monarchy, restoration of a Sanatan Hindu state with religious liberty, scrapping the federal system in favour of a two-tiered governance structure consisting of a central government and strong, non-partisan local governments. It also proposed forming a citizen commission to investigate the assets of public office holders and civil servants after 1990. The manifesto's "Reform 3.0" economic policy emphasized pro-private business reforms, including the dissolution of party-affiliated trade unions, streamlining the bureaucratic process, and reforming the tax system and laws to encourage foreign investment. The manifesto also called for the expansion of hydropower production, free basic healthcare and primary and secondary education in government school, and subsidies for high-value agriculture and herbal medicine industries in the hill and mountain regions.

=== People's Socialist Party Nepal ===
Loktantrik Samajwadi Party, Nepal, Terai Madesh Loktantrik Party and Janata Pragatisheel Party merged with the party ahead of the nomination deadline. The party released a 27-point manifesto on 26 January 2026 that focused on strengthening the federal structure. It advocated for implementing a "10+1" federal model based on the 2012 High-Level State Restructuring Commission's report to ensure ethnic identity. The manifesto called for constitutional amendments incorporating demand from the Madhesh and Janajati movements, as well as the 2025 Gen Z protests. It also proposed a transition to a directly elected presidential system, non-partisan local elections, proportional representation in the National Assembly, and reserved constituencies for Dalits and women. The manifesto also proposed the implementation of youth unemployment insurance, a decentralized budgetary allocation based on population and human development indicators, and official use of all languages of Nepal.

=== Pragatisheel Loktantrik Party ===
The party was formed by leaders of CPN (Maoist Centre) that disagreed with the formation of Nepali Communist Party along with Nepal Socialist Party (Naya Shakti) led by former prime minister Baburam Bhattarai and former chief whip of Rastriya Swatantra Party, Santosh Pariyar.

The party agreed to informally support CPN (UML) candidates in most constituencies in Karnali in exchange for support for Janardhan Sharma in Western Rukum 1. The party also decided to withdraw their candidate in Kalikot and support CPN (Maoist) candidate Khadga Bahadur Bishwakarma. Baburam Bhattarai also withdrew his candidacy from Gorkha 2. The party later decided to support Nepali Congress in the two constituencies in Gorkha.

The party's manifesto called for a transition to a directly elected presidential system, direct elections for provincial heads and a fully proportional electoral system. The party proposed limiting the federal parliament to legislative duties and forming a cabinet chosen by the executive head. The manifesto called for the formation of a National Development Authority that would be under the executive's leadership. It also proposed free education up to the secondary level, free basic healthcare and a unified social security system. The party also proposed 100 days of employment or equivalent in unemployment benefits for individuals aged 21 to 30. The manifesto called for the introduction of the right to reject and right to recall and voting rights of Nepalis abroad. It supported progressive taxation, encouraging foreign investment, including from Non-Resident Nepalis, and agricultural insurance. The manifesto aims for full domestic energy self-sufficiency. It also proposed granting citizenship by descent for children of Nepali emigrants up to three generations.

=== Ujyaalo Nepal Party ===
The party was formed after the elections were announced. Kul Man Ghising who was serving as a minister in the interim cabinet resigned on 7 January 2026 and joined the party. The party had signed an agreement to merge with Rastriya Swatantra Party, but the agreement collapsed. The party reached an agreement with Rastriya Paribartan Party to unify the two parties. Since the nomination deadline had passed for submitting the party list, Paribartan's party list was modified to include members of Ujyaalo Nepal.

On 15 February 2026, the party released its election manifesto, which aims for a "Development Decade". The party proposed a significant reduction in the downsizing administration, advocating for decreasing federal legislators to 201 and provincial legislators to 330, alongside directly elected chief ministers and non-partisan local elections. It also proposed introduction of right to reject and absentee ballots. The manifesto also proposed providing free university education and healthcare, commercial branding of marijuana and local liquor for export and promotion of organic farming. The party also focused on expanding renewable energy while guaranteeing every household 1,000 shares of hydropower stock at primary market prices. It also called for the abolition of politically affiliated trade unions and granting jus sanguinis citizenship.

== Candidates ==
=== Parties ===
The Election Commission called political parties seeking to contest the elections scheduled for 5 March 2026 to be registered within 26 November 2025. 120 political parties registered with the commission to contest the elections while only 68 fielded candidates. 64 parties submitted closed lists under proportional representation system.

Parties standing in at least 50 seats under a single election symbol
Party	Symbol		Ideology	Leader	Leader's seat	Seats contested	Male candidates	Female candidates
Party	FPTP	Prop.	Ideology	Leader	Leader's seat	Seats contested	Male candidates	Female candidates
Nepali Congress			Social democracy; Democratic socialism; Third Way	Gagan Thapa	Sarlahi 4	165	154	11
CPN (UML)			Marxism–Leninism; People's Multiparty Democracy	K. P. Sharma Oli	Jhapa 5	164	154	10
Nepali Communist Party			Marxism–Leninism	Pushpa Kamal Dahal	Eastern Rukum 1	164	152	12
Rastriya Swatantra Party			Progressive liberalism	Rabi Lamichhane	Chitwan 2	163	148	16
Rastriya Prajatantra Party			Constitutional monarchism; Economic liberalism; Hindu nationalism	Rajendra Prasad Lingden	Jhapa 3	163	155	8
People's Socialist Party, Nepal			Democratic socialism; Social democracy; Regionalism	Upendra Yadav	Saptari 3	94	86	8
Janamat Party	Janamat Party Election Symbol		Social democracy; Regionalism; Madheshi interests	C. K. Raut	Saptari 2	61	57	4
Pragatisheel Loktantrik Party			Democratic socialism; Progressive socialism	Durga Sob	Party list	82	80	2
Nepal Majdoor Kisan Party			Juche; Maoism	Narayan Man Bijukchhe	Did not contest	120	66	54
Rastriya Janamorcha			Marxism–Leninism	Chitra Bahadur K.C.	Party list	70	61	9
Ujyaalo Nepal Party			Social democracy; Progressivism	Kul Man Ghising	Kathmandu 3	105	99	6
Rastriya Pariwartan Party				Rajesh Portel	Party list	17	15	2
Aam Janata Party			Socialism	Prabhu Sah	Rautahat 3	98	76	25
Janadesh Party				Raman Kumar Karn	Mahottari 2	4	4	0
People's Socialist Party			Democratic socialism; Secularism; Regionalism	Ashok Rai	Did not contest	19	18	1
Nagrik Unmukti Party, Nepal			Social democracy; Tharu interests	Resham Lal Chaudhary	Candidacy voided	26	22	4
Rastriya Mukti Party Nepal			Social democracy; Regionalism	Rajendra Mahato	Sarlahi 2	33	30	3
CPN (Maoist)			Marxism–Leninism–Maoism	Netra Bikram Chand	Did not contest	130	126	4
Shram Sanskriti Party			Green politics; Localism; Agrarianism	Harka Sampang	Sunsari 1	109	102	7
Mongol National Organisation			Secularism; Regionalism; Janajati interests	Budhhalal Meche	Ilam 1	113	98	15

=== Candidates by province ===
==== Koshi Province ====
Constituency	Congress	UML	NCP	RSP	RPP	PSP-N	SSP	Others
Taplejung 1	Gajendra Tumyahang	Kshitij Thebe	Khel Prasad Budhathoki	Birendra Shrestha	Indra Prasad Thapa	Surya Gurung	Santosh Rai	
Panchthar 1	Narendra Kerung	Aiendra Sundar Nembang	Harka Bahadur Nembang	Mahendra Bikram Thamsuhang	Tej Kerumbang	Machindra Prasad Begha	Hastaraj Sharma	
Ilam 1	Niskal Rai	Kajiman Kagate	Rana Bahadur Rai	Bimal Gadaal	Jwala Nepal Dahal		Binod Nemwang Limbu	
Ilam 2	Bhesraj Acharaya	Suhang Nembang	Om Bahadur Gurung	Gokul Bahadur Rai	Ganesh Prasad Dulal		Sudip Rai	
Jhapa 1	Keshab Raj Pandey	Ram Chandra Upreti	Ashesh Ghimire	Nisha Dangi	Hemraj Karki	Ram Meche	Kewalram Rai	
Jhapa 2	Sarita Prasai	Devraj Ghimire	Dharmashila Chapagain	Indira Rana Magar	Swagat Nepal		Keshav Kumar Bhandari	Ramesh Kumar Rajbanshi (JP)
Jhapa 3	Rajendra Ghimire	Hari Bahadur Rajbanshi	Dilli Ghimire	Prakash Pathak	Rajendra Prasad Lingden	Karna Lal Rajbanshi	Dipak Timilsina	Bharat Lal Rajbanshi (JP)
Jhapa 4	Deuman Thebe	Lal Prasad Sawa Limbu	Purushottam Chudel	Shambhu Prasad Dhakal	Bhakti Prasad Sitaula	Paltan Tajpuriya	Amrita Devi Rai	Luthro Murmu (JP)
Jhapa 5	Mandhara Chimariya	K. P. Sharma Oli	Ranjit Tamang	Balendra Shah	Laxmi Prasad Sangraula	Dhiren Subba	Samir Tamang	Amrit Mahato (JP)
Sankhuwasabha 1	Dipan Shrestha	Arjun Karki	Sarita Khadka Thapa	Mingma Sherpa	Haridev Shrestha	Bharat Kumar Rai	Uma Kumari Rai	
Tehrathum 1	Santosh Subba	Bhanubhakta Dhakal	Ranadhoj Kandangwa	Surendra Karki	Hom Bhakta Kerumbang		Subindra Kumar Limbu	
Bhojpur 1	Balkrishna Thapa	Sherdhan Rai	Ajambar Kangmang Rai	Ramesh Prasad Ojha	Janak Nepal		Dhrubaraj Rai	
Dhankuta 1	Dinesh Rai	Rajendra Kumar Rai	Dharma Prasad Paudel	Dinesh Bhandari	Bibhatsu Thapa	Aaitraj Limbu	San Bahadur Tamang	
Morang 1	Khadga Bahadur Phago	Ghanashyam Khatiwada	Kulprasad Samba	Yagyamani Neupane	Purna Bahadur Waiba		Shanti Pakhrin Lama	
Morang 2	Minendra Rijal	Dilip Kumar Bagediya	Chandrabir Rai	Krishna Kumar Karki	Bansaraj Rajbanshi	Binod Kumar Singh Gangaai	Abuho Rairaha	Manoj Kumar Rajbanshi (RUPN); Ghanashyam Chaudhary (JP)
Morang 3	Sunil Kumar Sharma	Iran Kumar Rai	Devman Sambahamphe	Ganesh Karki	Prem Subedi	Majebul Rehman	Amir Magar	Bhuwan Kumar Wagle (RUPN)
Morang 4	Gururaj Ghimire	Jivan Ghimire	Amanlal Modi	Santosh Rajbanshi	Madhav Acharya	Tabarez Akhtar Alam	Krishna Kumar Atal	Jivan Kumar Gupta (JP)
Morang 5	Phool Kumar Lalbani	Manoj Agrawal	Shiva Kumar Mandal	Aasha Jha	Kumud Raya	Raj Kumar Yadav		Yogendra Mandal (RUPN); Prameshwar Murmu (JP)
Morang 6	Shekhar Koirala	Binod Dhakal	Opendra Kumar Raya	Rubina Acharya	Sabin Niraula	Raju Mandal Rajbanshi	Matrika Paudel	Sudharam Majhi Tharu (JP)
Sunsari 1	Sujendra Tamang	Tikaram Limbu	Surya Bahadur Bhattarai	Sarin Tamang (Goma)	Uddhav Shrestha	Sanjay Rai	Harka Sampang	Nagendra Bahadur Limbu (PSP)
Sunsari 2	Rajiv Koirala	Sujan Lama	Ram Kumari Chaudhahry	Lal Bikram Thapa	Dinesh Kumar Basnet	Ramchandra Mahato	Chetan Rai	Mahabir Mahato (JP)
Sunsari 3	Bijay Kumar Gachhadar	Bhagwati Chaudhary	Durgesh Chaudhary	Ashok Chaudhary	Ghanashyam Gurung	Badri Prasad Yadav	Ram Prasad Sada	Ram Narayam Tharu (JP)
Sunsari 4	Gyanendra Bahadur Karki	Jagadish Prasad Kusiyait	Mohammad Mehfooz Ansari	Dipak Kumar Sah	Prem Prasad Bhattarai		Bishnu Rana	Kapaleshwar Yadav (JP)
Solukhumbu 1	Prakash Singh Karki	Kalpana Rai	Asim Rai	Rishidhan Rai	Rajendra Basnet	Lakpa Sherpa	Biyas Rai	
Khotang 1	Birbal Kaji Rai	Devbikram Rai	Hari Roka	Rudhra Giri	Dipak Tamang	Sunil Chamling	Aaren Rai	
Okhaldhunga 1	Kumar Luitel	Asmita Thapa	Ambir Babu Gurung	Bisworaj Pokharel	Dik Prasad Bastola		Uddhav Kumar Rai	
Udayapur 1	Bidur Basnet	Durga Kumar Thapa	Baldev Chaudhary	Parash Gelal	Subhas Chandra Khadka		Rajesh Kumar Rai	Devraj Roka (Ind.)
Udayapur 2	Ram Kumar Rai	Ambar Rayamajhi	Suresh Kumar Rai	Surya Bahadur Tamang	Bishnu Bahadur Khadka		Balaraj Rai	Major Rai (Ind.)

==== Madhesh Province ====
Constituency	Congress	UML	NCP	RSP	RPP	PSP-N	Janamat	Others
Saptari 1	Ramdev Sah	Sumanraj Pyakurel	Rabindra Chaudhary	Pushpa Chaudhary	Sanyajit Kumar Jha	Shyamsundar Sardar	Jay Kant Raut	Sumit Kumar Sah (SwaP)
Saptari 2	Ram Kumar Yadav	Mohammad Ziyaul Rehman	Suryanath Prasad Yadav	Ramji Yadav	Ajay Kumar Das	Umesh Kumar Yadav	C. K. Raut	Satish Kumar Singh (SwaP); Anish Ansari (Mukti)
Saptari 3	Dinesh Kumar Yadav	Tarakanta Chaudhary	Arun Kumar Sah	Umakanta Chaudhary	Umdeshwar Sah	Upendra Yadav	Surendra Sharma	
Saptari 4	Tejulal Chaudhary	Ganga Prasad Chaudhary	Rubi Kumari Karna	Sitaram Shah	Rup Kumar Neupane	Bobby Singh	Jitendra Kumar Sah	
Siraha 1	Ramsundar Chaudhary	Ram Shankar Yadav	Ramchandra Yadav	Bablu Gupta	Basudev Sah	Satyanarayan Yadav	Ramswaroop Chaudhary	
Siraha 2	Ram Chandra Yadav	Naveen Kumar Yadav	Mukti Singh	Shiv Shankar Yadav	Shyamkishor Sah Haluwai	Sanjeev Kumar Yadav	Binod Kumar Yadav	
Siraha 3	Subhash Chandra Yadav	Lilanath Shrestha	Bishwonath Sah	Dr Sambhu Yadav	Devdayal Singh	Aseshwar Yadav	Rohit Mahato	
Siraha 4	Chandrakala Kumari Yadav	Dharmanath Prasad Sah	Ajay Shankar Nayak	Tapeshwar Yadav	Shubendra Kumar Sah	Rajkishor Yadav	Birendra Prasad Mahato	
Dhanusha 1	Ram Paltan Sah	Ramchandra Mandal	Matrika Prasad Yadav		Manoj Malla Thakuri	Deepak Karki	Brahmadev Mahato	
Dhanusha 2	Dinesh Parshaila	Umashankar Argariya	Ram Chandra Jha	Ram Binod Yadav	Viheshwar Mandal	Pashupati Yadav	Surendra Prasad Yadav	
Dhanusha 3	Bimalendra Nidhi	Julie Kumari Mahato	Ram Lalit Mandal	Manish Jha	Huseni Kabadi	Parmeshwar Sah Sudi	Gopal Sah	Diwakar Sah (Ind.)
Dhanusha 4	Mahendra Yadav	Raghubir Mahaseth	Sanjay Kumar Mahato	Raj Kishor Mahato	Rambabu Sah	Krishna Chandra Sah	Indrajit Kumar Yadav	
Mahottari 1	Mukesh Raj Kafle	Laxmi Mahato Koiri	Girirajmani Pokharel	Pramod Kumar Mahato	Yanikhar Gautam	Yognarayan Mahato	Birendra Mahato	Bijay Pokharel (Ind.)
Mahottari 2	Kiran Yadav	Kasim Nadaf	Laxman Yadav	Dipak Kumar Sah	Ramlakhan Sah	Sharat Singh Bhandari	Jiya Kumar Pandey	
Mahottari 3	Bajarang Nepali	Manoj Kumar Singh	Rajkishor Sah Sudi	Ujjawal Kumar Jha	Rajeshwar Ray Yadav	Minakshi Thakur	Arbin Thakur	Mohammad Rizwan Ansari (NFSP); Hari Narayan Yadav (Ind.); Ramaadhaar Kaapar (Ind.)
Mahottari 4	Mahendra Kumar Raya	Nilam Adhikari	Bharat Prasad Sah	Gauri Kumari	Sunil Kumar Singh	Surendra Kumar Yadav	Manoj Kumar Sah	
Sarlahi 1	Sambhulal Shrestha	Manoj Devkota	Pramod Sah	Nitima Bhandari	Suryanarayan Yadav	Ram Prakash Chaudhary	Shreejanya Mahato	
Sarlahi 2	Saroj Kumar Yadav	Nageshwor Sah	Mahindra Ray Yadav	Rabin Mahato	Rajkishor Ray Yadav	Bharat Chaudhary	Bipin Kapad	Rajendra Mahato (Mukti)
Sarlahi 3	Binod Khanal	Hari Prasad Upreti	Narayan Kaji Shrestha	Narendra Sah Kalwar	Dholaram Barakoti	Jay Prakash Yadav	Sunil Prasad Gupta	
Sarlahi 4	Gagan Thapa	Amanish Kumar Yadav	Ragnish Raya Yadav	Amresh Kumar Singh	Pradeep Jha	Rameshwar Ray Yadav	Rakesh Kumar Mishra	
Rautahat 1	Anil Kumar Jha	Ajay Kumar Gupta	Madhav Kumar Nepal	Rajesh Chaudhary	Shreeram Sah	Yogendra Rae Yadav	Devendra Mishra	
Rautahat 2	Firdosh Alam	Mohammed Atiullah	Kiran Kumar Sah	Sheikh Sagir	Ravindra Prasad Sah	Ram Aashish Ray Yadav	Sonu Kushwaha	
Rautahat 3	Ram Kripal Yadav	Kundan Prasad Kushwaha	Punam Devi	Dhiraj Patel	Sikindra Prasad Sah	Gobinda Chaudhary	Mohammad Praved Alam	Prabhu Sah (AJP)
Rautahat 4	Dev Prasad Timilsena	Ramji Sah Sonar	Ram Kumar Bhattarai	Ganesh Paudel	Bahadur Yadav	Rajkumar Das Tatma	Ram Kalyan Raut	Rishi Dhamala (AJP)
Bara 1	Shambhu Budhathoki	Achyut Prasad Mainali	Santosh Dhungel	Ganesh Dhimal	Laxmi Sah Kalwar	Rambabu Prasad Yadav	Kamullah Ansari	
Bara 2	Bhaiyaram Yadav	Balbir Prasad Chaudhary	Ramesh Prasad Yadav	Chandan Singh	Lal Bahadur Prasad Teli	Ramkishr Prasad Yadav	Rajesh Sah	Aatmaram Sah (AJP)
Bara 3	Farmullah Mansoor	Jwala Kumari Sah0095daff	Bharat Prasad Sah	Arvind Shah	Rajendra Prasad Jaiswal	Rambabu Kumar Yadav	Pramod Gupta	
Bara 4	Shyambabu Gupta	Krishna Kumar Shrestha	Ajay Kushwaha	Rahabar Ansari	Dileep Kumar Sharma Nepal	Sanju Sah Kanu	Hasanjaan Miya	Sarbendra Khanal (RPP)
Parsa 1	Anil Kumar Rungata	Pradeep Yadav	Ajay Chaurasiya	Hari Panta	Nandakishor Prasad Shreewastav	Ramnaresh Yadav	Omprakash Sarraf	
Parsa 2	Ajay Chaurasiya	Rima Kumari Yadav	Manoj Chaudhary	Sushil Patel	Bina Jaiswal	Ashok Kumar Agrawal	Shyam Kumar Gupta	
Parsa 3	Surendra Prasad Chaudhary	Rupesh Kumar Pandaya	Chhotelal Yadav	Ramakant Prasad Chaurasiya	Nabin Kumar Singh	Nagendra Prasad Yadav	Malti Kumari Kushwaha	
Parsa 4	Ramesh Rijal	Zalim Miya Mansoori	Jay Prakash Tharu	Tek Bahadur Shakya	Shanta Kumar Joshi	Kripasindhu Chaudhary	Sima Gupta	

==== Bagmati Province ====
Constituency	Congress	UML	NCP	RSP	RPP	UNP	Others
Dolakha 1	Ajaya Babu Shiwakoti	Parbat Gurung	Bishal Khadka	Jagdish Kharel	Prabin Kumar Thokar Tamang		
Ramechhap 1	Ramchandra Khadka	Madhav Prasad Dhungel	Shyam Kumar Shrestha	Krishnahari Budhathoki	Gore Bahadur Tamang	Deep Bahadur Yonjan	
Sindhuli 1	Ujjwal Baral	Pradeep Katuwal Chhetri	Dekendra Subedi	Dhanendra Karki	Ramnarayan Adhikari Danuwar	Motilal Tamang	
Sindhuli 2	Sushila Thing	Manoj Jung Thapa	Lekhnath Dahal	Asish Gajurel	Mukunda Prasad Gajurel		Maheshwar Dahal (Ind.)
Rasuwa 1	Mohan Acharya	Prem Bahadur Tamang	Madhav Lamichhane	Basanta Bhatta	Hariprasad Ghimire	Man Bahadur Tamang	
Dhading 1	Krishna Rijal	Bhumi Tripathi	Rajendra Prasad Pandey	Ashika Tamang	Geeta Prasad Acharya	Shyamraja Pandey	
Dhading 2	Ramesh Prasad Dhamala	Dhan Bahadur Ghale	Ram Bahadur Bhandari	Bodh Narayan Shrestha	Suresh Rijal	Amir Tamang	
Nuwakot 1	Prakash Sharan Mahat	Badri Mainali	Hit Bahadur Tamang	Bikram Timilsina	Bima Thapa	Amit Tamang	
Nuwakot 2	Jagdishwor Narsingh K.C.	Keshavraj Pandey	Harinath Khatiwada	Achyutam Lamichhane	Jhanak Pyakurel	Gyandendra Prakash Ghale	
Kathmandu 1	Prawal Thapa	Mohanraj Regmi	Menaka Bhandari	Ranju Darshana	Rabindra Mishra	Mangal Lal Shrestha	
Kathmandu 2	Kabir Sharma	Maniram Phuyal	Nitesh Paudel	Sunil K.C.	Kuntidevi Pokharel	Pawan Pokhrel	
Kathmandu 3	Ramesh Aryal	Rameshwor Phuyal	Niraj Lama	Raju Pandey	Surendra Singh Bohara	Kulman Ghising	
Kathmandu 4	Sachin Timalsina	Rajan Bhattarai	Indra Bhusal	Pukar Bam	Surendra Bhandari	Jhanak Bahadur Adhikari	
Kathmandu 5	Pradip Paudel	Ishwar Pokhrel	Kalpana Sharma	Sasmit Pokhrel	Kamal Thapa	Shree Ram Gurung	
Kathmandu 6	Krishna Baniya	Aman Kumar Maskey	Hemlal Sharma	Shishir Khanal	Uddhavraj Bhetwal	Warish Dharel	
Kathmandu 7	Pramodhari Guragai	Prakash Shrestha	Basanta Prasad Manandhar	Ganesh Parajuli	Lal Kumar Lama	Bimala Lama	
Kathmandu 8	Sapana Rajbhandari	Rajesh Shakya	Suman Sayami	Biraj Bhakta Shrestha	Nabin Shahi	Rajan Khadgi	
Kathmandu 9	Nanu Bastola	Ajaykranti Shakya	Radhakrishna Maharjan	Dol Prasad Aryal	Dilip Kumar Karki	Rameshwar Shrestha	
Kathmandu 10	Himal Karki	Binod Shrestha	Rupa Maharjan	Pradip Bista	Balaram Thapa	Dr. rakesh Neupane	
Bhaktapur 1	Kiran Neupane	Som Prasad Mishra	Hariram Lawaju	Rukesh Ranjit	Bharat Bahadur Khadka	Ramesh Balla	Prem Suwal (NMKP)
Bhaktapur 2	Kabir Rana	Mahesh Basnet	Ram Prasad Sapkota	Rajiv Khatri	Bikram Thapa	Jitram Lama	Ramesh Baidya (NMKP)
Lalitpur 1	Udaya Shumsher Rana	Chetnath Sanjel	Sunil Maharjan	Buddha Ratna Maharjan	Sajina Karki	Padam Tamang	
Lalitpur 2	Prem Krishna Maharjan	Prem Bahadur Maharjan	Rajendra Amatya	Jagdish Kharel	Raghubarraj Thapa	Rajaram Tandukar	
Lalitpur 3	Jitendra Kumar Shrestha	Sandan Thapa Magar	Rajkaji Maharjan	Toshima Karki	Sabin Khadka	Ashutosh Bijay Pant	
Kavrepalanchok 1	Gunaraj Moktan	Amit Tamang	Dinanath Gautam	Madhu Kumar Chaulagai	Nabaraj Satyal	Yogendra Lama	Rajesh Kumar Shrestha (Ind.); Jiwan Lama (Ind.); Yuvaraj Chaualagain (Ind.)
Kavrepalanchok 2	Madhu Prasad Acharya	Ashok Kumar Byanju	Basundhara Humagain	Badan Kumar Bhandari	Ranjib Shrestha	Jyotsana Sainju	Tanka Bahadur Lama (SSP)
Sindhupalchok 1	Jangabahadur Lama	Saresh Nepal	Madhav Sapkota	Bharat Prasad Parajuli	Rammani Neupane		
Sindhupalchok 2	Bangshalal Tamang	Sher Bahadur Tamang	Yuvaraj Dulal	Ajay Shrestha	Gopikrishna Chaulagain		
Makwanpur 1	Mahalaxmi Upadhaya	Rameshwor Rana Magar	Bijay Gautam	Prakash Gautam	Deepak Bahadur Singh	Surendra Lama	
Makwanpur 2	Buddha Lama	Mahesh Bartaula	Labasher Bista	Prashant Uprety	Ram Bahadur Thokar	Prabin Kumar Syangtan	
Chitwan 1	Rajendra Burlakoti	Dawa Dorje Lama	Krishna Panta	Hari Dhakal	Balaram Khanal	Dhan Bahadur Gurung	
Chitwan 2	Mina Kumari Kharel	Asmin Ghimire	Pratap Gurung	Rabi Lamichhane	Jagadish Adhikari	Nikumar Pakhrin	
Chitwan 3	Tek Prasad Gurung	Shankarraj Thapaliya	Renu Dahal	Sobita Gautam	Dipak Thapa Magar	Dambar Bahadur Tamang	

==== Gandaki Province ====
Constituency	Congress	UML	NCP	RSP	RPP	Others
Gorkha 1	Prem Kumar Khatri	Ramchandra Lamichhane	Hariraj Adhikari	Sudan Gurung	Kedarmani Khanal	
Gorkha 2	Prakash Chandra Dawadi	Milan Gurung	Lekhnath Neupane	Kabindra Burlakoti	Kul Bahadur Basnet	
Manang 1	Tek Bahadur Gurung		Yasodha Subedi Gurung			Ram Bahadur Ghale (MNO)
Lamjung 1	Gam Prasad Gurung	Prithvi Subba Gurung	Hari Jung Tamang	Dharma Raj K.C.	Kebindra Jung Gurung	
Kaski 1	Tilak Bahadur Ranabhat	Bain Bahadur Chhetri	Ramkaji Gurung	Khadak Raj Paudel	Baburam Thapa	
Kaski 2	Madhav Prasad Bastola	Rashmi Acharya	Hem Bahadur Thapa	Uttam Paudel	Hemjung Gurung	
Kaski 3	Manoj Gurung	Damodar Paudel Bairagi	Gopak Guru	Bina Gurung	Arjun Khanal	
Tanahun 1	Gobinda Bhattarai	Bhagwati Neupane	Bidyanath Dhakal	Swarnim Wagle	Abhishek Joshi	
Tanahun 2	Shankar Bhandari	Kedar Sigdel	Som Bahadur Thapa	Shreeram Neupane	Yam Bahadur Khand	
Syangja 1	Bharat Raj Dhakal	Min Prasad Gurung	Shailendra Ghimire	Dhananjya Regmi	Hukum Bahadur Rana	
Syangja 2	Bhagwat Prakash Malla	Khim Bahadur Thapa	Padam Bishwokarma	Jhabilal Dumre	Rabin Pathak	
Nawalpur 1	Balkrishna Ghimire	Bhagirath Sapkota	Lok Prasad Bhurtel	Rajan Gautam	Dipak Chandra Baskota	
Nawalpur 2	Om Bahadur Gharti Magar	Tilak Mahat Chhetri	Ganeshman Mahato	Manish Khanal	Run Kumari Mahato	
Mustang 1	Yogesh Gauchan Thakali	Indradhara Dadu Bista	Mutuk Gurung	Aditya Thakali	Kamala Lalchan	Suresh Sherchan (UNP)
Myagdi 1	Karna Bahadur Bhandari	Harikrishna Shrestha	Arjun Thapa	Yubaraj Rokka	Dambar Bahadur Subedi	Mahabir Pun (Ind.)
Baglung 1	Bhim Shrees Rana	Hira Bahadur Khatri		Sushil Khadka	Kalyan Bikram Acharya	Krishna Adhikari (RJM)
Baglung 2	Tekraj Paudel	Manju Sharma	Gyannath Gaire	Som Sharma	Anchal Shahi Thakuri	
Parbat 1	Arjun Prasad Joshi	Padam Giri	Manahari Sharma	Sagar Bhusal	Durga Bahadur Malla	

==== Lumbini Province ====
Constituency	Congress	UML	NCP	RSP	RPP	PSP-N	Janamat	Others	
Gulmi 1	Chandrakanta Bhandari	Pradeep Gyawali	Sudarshan Baral	Sagar Dhakal	Ajit Kumar Shrestha				
Gulmi 2	Bhuwan Prasad Shrestha	Gokarna Bista	Shreeram Mahat	Gobinda Panthi	Janak Sen				
Palpa 1	Sandip Rana	Narayan Prasad Acharya	Hom Bahadur Sunari	Bimal Panta	Brihaspati Aryal				
Palpa 2	Himal Dutta Shrestha	Thakur Prasad Gaire	Som Prasad Pandey	Madhav Thapa	Dul Bahadur Kunwar			Top Aslami Magar (RJP)	
Arghakhanchi 1	Bishnu Prasad Khanal	Pitambar Bhusal	Ram Bahadur Chauhan	Hari Prasad Bhusal	Jhabindra Phullel			Pashupati Dhakal (RJM)	
Nawalparasi 1	Binod Chaudhary	Ram Prasad Pandaya	Sindhu Jalesha	Bikram Khanal	Nawanit Kumar Mishra	Hridayesh Tripathi	Ganesh Chaudhary		
Nawalparasi 2	Bharat Thapa	Lekhnath Kharel	Devendra Paudel	Narendra Kumar Gupta	Dhruba Bahadur Pradhan	Devendra Yadav	Jivan Mallah		
Rupandehi 1	Hira Bahadur Khatri	Dadhiram Neupane	Ghanashyam Yadav	Sunil Lamsal	Prajwal Bohara	Mohammad Aslam Khan	Nilu Chaudhary	Umashankar Chaudhary (NUPN)	
Rupandehi 2	Chun Prasad Paudel	Bishnu Prasad Paudel	Subas Pandey	Sulav Kharel		Deepak Gurung	Ramesh Lodh	Keshav Bahadur Thapa (RJP)	
Rupandehi 3	Sushil Gurung	Basudev Ghimire	Faiz Ahmed Khan	Lekh Jung Thapa	Gaurav Bohara	Shreeniwas Yadav	Bishal Gupta		
Rupandehi 4	Aasutosh Mishra	Pramod Kumar Yadav	Babulal Yadav	Kanhaiya Baniya	Ahmeddhin Khan	Sarbendra Nath Shukla	Bhopendra Prasad Yadav		
Rupandehi 5	Bharat Kumar Shah	Khimlal Bhattarai	Mohammad Wakil Musalman	Tafik Ahamad Khan	Meen Prasad Ghimire	Mohammad Wahid Faqir	Om Prakash Yadav		
Kapilvastu 1	Atahar Kamal Musalman	Bishram Chaudhary	Krishna Kunwar	Mohan Acharya	Shatrughan Prasad Chaudhary	Babbu Singh Yadav	Narendra Prasad Chaudhary		
Kapilvastu 2	Surendra Raj Acharya	Driganarayan Pandaya	Brijesh Kumar Gupta	Bikram Singh Thapa	Bishnu Prasad Bhandari	Ram Newas Yadav	Murali Kurmi		
Kapilvastu 3	Abhishek Pratap Shah	Birendra Kumar Kanodia	Ehsan Ahmed Khan	Prakash Rajauriya	Premshankar Shukla		Ishwar Kumar Raut		
Eastern Rukum 1	Kusum Devi Thapa Magar	Lilamani Gautam	Pushpa Kamal Dahal	Lakhan Thapa	Roshandhoj Shah			Sandeep Pun (PLP)	
Rolpa 1	Sudan Kumar Wali	Gokul Prasad Gharti	Barsaman Pun	Balaram Thapa	Ammar Bahadur Thapa			Chudamani Wali (Maoist)	
Pyuthan 1	Gobindaj Prasad Pokharel	Surya Bahadur Thapa Chhetri	Krishnadhoj Khadka	Sushant Baidik	Dhaneshwar Pandit			Tilak G.C. (RJM)	
Dang 1	Yogendra Chaudhary	Rewati Raman Sharma Ghimire	Metmani Chaudhary	Devraj Pathak	Binaya Budhathoki	Bharatlal Chaudhary		Kul Prasad K.C. (Ind.)	
Dang 2	Kiran Kishor Ghimire	Shankar Pokharel	Nirmal Acharya	Bipin Kumar Acharya	Rhishikesh Pokharel	Dundiraj Thapa			Jharendra Bahadur Khatri (NUPN)
Dang 3	Deepak Giri	Ghanashyam Pandey	Dhan Bahadur Maski	Kamal Subedi	Damodar Bhandari	Shobha Dangi		Mahesh Chaudhary (NUPN)	
Banke 1	Narayan Prasad Paudel	Surya Prasad Dhakal	Narendra Pandey	Suresh Chaudhary	Pradeep Kumar Shah	Rajendra Kumar Bishwokarma		Krishna K.C. (PLP)	
Banke 2	Sudhanshu Koirala	Mohammad Ishtiyaq Rayi	Dipendra Bista	Bibek Shrestha	Rishiraj Devkota	Kamaruddin Rayi	Mohammad Adaaz Sai		
Banke 3	Amar Singh Pun	Suman Malla	Dipak Gauri Magar	Khagendra Sunar	Tarak Singh Tharu	Suryalal Yadav	Firoz Khan	Dhrubaraj Tharu (NUPN)	
Bardiya 1	Sanjay Kumar Gautam	Saleekram Adhikari	Bishnu Prasad Tharu	Thakur Singh Tharu	Bir Bahadur Kami	Manoj Yadav	Yamnath Ghimari	Abdul Khan (NUPN)	
Bardiya 2	Kishor Shingh Rathore	Bimala B.K.	Suresh Pantha	Shreedhar Pokharel	Sushil Chaudhary	Anirudhya Gupta	Shahi Kumar Yadav	Khushiram Tharu (NUPN); Dharma Bahadur Chaudhary (UPN)	

==== Karnali Province ====
Constituency	Congress	UML	NCP	RSP	RPP	Others
Salyan 1	Keshav Bahadur Bista	Gulab Jung Shah	Ramesh Kumar Malla	Lalit Kumar Chand	Anisha Nepali	
Dolpa 1	Karna Bahadur Budha	Lanka Bahadur Rokaya	Dhan Bahadur Buda	Devsingh Aidee	Hariprasad Dangi	
Mugu 1	Khadga Shahi	Purna Bahadur Rokaya	Chandra Bahadur Shahi	Rajendra Bahadur Shahi	Bal Bahadur Malla	Aiten Kumar Malla (PLP)
Jumla 1	Dip Bahadur Shahi	Shantilal Mahat	Naresh Bhandari	Binita Kathayat	Gyanendra Shahi	Manarishi Dhital (PLP)
Kalikot 1	Harsha Bahadur Bam	Nagindra Shahi	Mahendra Bahadur Shahi	Prakash Neupane	Surya Bahdur Shah	Khadga Bahadur Bishwakarma (Maoist)
Humla 1	Jaypati Rokaya	Dal Phadera	Dipendra Rokaya	Tashi Lahajom	Chhakka Budha	Jatil Karki (PLP)
Jajarkot 1	Khadak Bahadur Buda	Dambar Bahadur Singh	Shakti Bahadur Basnet	Raghab Karki	Krishna Bahadur Shah	
Dailekh 1	Basana Thapa	Rabindraraj Sharma	Ambar Bahadur Thapa	Nanda Kishor Basnet	Rana Bahadur Singh	
Dailekh 2	Dikpal Kumar Shahi	Laxmi Prasad Pokharel	Yogendra Bahadur Shahi	Bakhat Bahadur Shahi	Babita Shahi	
Surkhet 1	Bishnu Bahadur Khadka	Dhruba Kumar Shahi	Jeet Bahadur Rana	Tek Bahadur Singh Thakuri	Rabikiran Hamal	Thammar Bahadur Bista (UNP)
Surkhet 2	Narayan Koirala	Kulmani Devkota	Jhak Bahadur Malla	Ramesh Sapkota	Kabiram Puri	
Western Rukum 1	Raju K.C.	Nandaram Devkota	Gopal Sharma	Man Bahadur Shahi	Gopal Khadka	Janardan Sharma (PLP)

==== Sudurpashchim Province ====
Constituency	Congress	UML	NCP	RSP	RPP	Others
Bajura 1	Janak Raj Giri	Lal Bahadur Thapa	Prakash Bahadur Shah	Hemraj Thapa	Keshar Bahadur Shahi	
Achham 1	Bharat Kumar Swar	Dipak Bahadur Saud	Bhim Bahadur Rawal	Om Prakash Rawal	Lokendra Bahadur Shah	
Achham 2	Pushpa Bahadur Shah	Yagya Bahadur Bogati	Bal Bahadur Kunwar	Bhupadev Shah	Meen Bahadur Shahi	
Bajhang 1	Prakash Rasaili	Ain Bahadur Mahara	Meen Bahadur Kunwar	Shailendra Kumar Singh	Bishwa Prakash Jethara	
Doti 1	Bharat Bahadur Khadka	Deepak Dhami	Trilochan Bhatta	Narendra Bahadur Khadka	Khadga Prasad Agrawal	
Kailali 1	Janakraj Chaudhary	Dwarika Prasad Neupane	Ramlal Dagaura Tharu	Komal Gyawali	Lokendra Kunwar	Janak Shah (PLP)
Kailali 2	Bijay Bahadur Swar	Surya Bahadur Thapa	Nanda Bahadur Saud	KP Khanal	Bharat Singh B.C.	Patiram Chaudhary (NUPN)
Kailali 3	Bhim Baduwal	Gaurishankar Chaudhary	Beerman Chuadhary	Jagat Prasad Joshi	Birendra Bam	Bikram Chaudhary (NUPN)
Kailali 4	Gorakh Bahadur Bista	Lekhraj Bhatta	Hariram Chaudhary	Khemraj Koirala	Kamal Bam Rajbaar	Dhan Bahadur Sunar (NUPN)
Kailali 5	Nar Narayan Shah	Yagyaraj Dhungana	Prem Bahadur Ale	Ananda Chand	Roshan Shahi	Jagannath Chaudhary (NUPN)
Darchula 1	Dharmananda Joshi	Ganesh Singh Thagunna	Laxman Dutta Joshi	Rajesh Singh Samant	Rajendra Bahadur Chand	
Baitadi 1	Chatur Bahadur Chand	Damodar Bhandari	Parmananda Bhatta	Harimohan Bhandari	Bhupen Bahadur Chand	
Dadeldhura 1	Nain Singh Mahar	Chakra Prasad Snehi	Mansingh Maal	Tara Joshi	Gobinda Khadayat	
Kanchanpur 1	Gopi Upadhyaya	Tara Lama Tamang	Bina Magar	Janak Singh Dhami	Dilli Bahadur Shahi	Krishna Bahadur Chaudhary (NUPN)
Kanchanpur 2	Narayan Prakash Saud	Bachan Bahadur Singh	Madhav Pant	Deepak Bohara	Teertharaj Chataut	Satrudhan Chaudhary (NUPN)
Kanchanpur 3	Hari Bohara	Deepak Prakash Bhatta	Maan Bahadur Sunar	Gyanendra Mahatara	Purna Bahadur Chand	Gobinda Prasad Chaudhary (NUPN)

=== 2022–25 MPs contesting under a different political affiliation ===
Outgoing MP	2022 party	2022 constituency	2026 party	2026 constituency
Krishna Kumar Shrestha	Unified Socialist	Bara 4	CPN (UML)	Bara 4
Pradeep Yadav	PSP-Nepal	Parsa 1	CPN (UML)	Parsa 1
Birendra Prasad Mahato	PSP-Nepal	Siraha 4	Janamat	Siraha 4
Abdul Khan	Janamat	Party list	Nagrik Unmukti, Nepal	Bardiya 1
Kiran Kumar Sah	Independent	Rautahat 2	NCP	Rautahat 2
Santosh Pariyar	RSP	Party list	Pragatisheel Loktantrik	Party list
Janardan Sharma	Maoist Centre	Western Rukum 1	Pragatisheel Loktantrik	Western Rukum 1
Amresh Kumar Singh	Independent	Sarlahi 4	RSP	Sarlahi 4
Yogendra Mandal	Independent	Morang 5	Urjasheel	Morang 5

=== 2022–25 MPs not standing for re-election ===
Nepali Congress

- Ramnath Adhikari
- Dilendra Prasad Badu
- Rajendra Bajgain
- Bir Bahadur Balayar
- Mohan Bahadur Basnet
- Santosh Chalise
- Sher Bahadur Deuba
- Shyam Kumar Ghimire
- Dhanraj Gurung
- Sita Gurung
- Bishnu Kumar Karki
- Rajendra Kumar K.C.
- Deepak Khadka
- Narayan Khadka
- Purna Bahadur Khadka
- Ramhari Khatiwada
- Shashanka Koirala
- Dig Bahadur Limbu
- Badri Pandey
- Dilli Raj Pant
- Bishwa Prakash Sharma
- Prakash Man Singh
- Purna Bahadur Tamang
- Aain Bahadur Shahi Thakuri
- Raju Thapa
- Hridaya Ram Thani
- Ram Krishna Yadav
- Ramesh Lekhak

CPN (UML)

- Bhim Acharya
- Balaram Adhikari
- Gokul Prasad Baskota
- Mahesh Basnet
- Chhabilal Bishwakarma
- Bidya Bhattarai
- Yogesh Bhattarai
- Basudev Ghimire
- Mangal Prasad Gupta
- Raj Kumar Gupta
- Man Bahadur Gurung
- Basanta Kumar Nemwang
- Rishikesh Pokharel
- Manbir Rai
- Top Bahadur Rayamajhi
- Krishna Gopal Shrestha
- Hari Prasad Upreti
- Ram Shankar Yadav

Maoist Centre

- Surya Man Dong Tamang
- Sudan Kirati
- Tshering Damdul Lama
- Purna Bahadur Gharti Magar
- Rekha Sharma

RPP

- Bikram Pandey
- Dhawal Shamsher Rana

Unified Socialist

- Bhanu Bhakta Joshi
- Prakash Jwala
- Sher Bahadur Kunwor

PSP-N

- Nawal Kishor Sah

PSP

- Ashok Rai

Loktantrik Samajwadi

- Mahantha Thakur

NUP

- Arun Kumar Chaudhary
- Ganga Ram Chaudhary
- Lalbir Chaudhary
- Ranjeeta Shrestha

== Results ==
Party	Proportional			Constituency			Total seats	+/–
Party	Votes	%	Seats	Votes	%	Seats	Total seats	+/–
Rastriya Swatantra Party	5,183,493	47.84	57	4,650,697	44.17	125	182	+162
Nepali Congress	1,759,172	16.24	20	2,008,639	19.08	18	38	–51
CPN (Unified Marxist–Leninist)	1,455,885	13.44	16	1,623,159	15.42	9	25	–53
Nepali Communist Party	811,577	7.49	9	976,016	9.27	8	17	–28
Shram Sanskriti Party	385,902	3.56	4	303,902	2.89	3	7	New
Rastriya Prajatantra Party	330,684	3.05	4	207,270	1.97	1	5	–9
People's Socialist Party, Nepal	182,285	1.68	0	193,303	1.84	0	0	–12
Rastriya Pariwartan Party	172,489	1.59	0	10,006	0.10	0	0	New
Janamat Party	79,435	0.73	0	63,764	0.61	0	0	–6
RMP-N – PSP – NUP-N	62,069	0.57	0	50,049	0.48	0	0	New
Nepal Workers Peasants Party	42,299	0.39	0	41,018	0.39	0	0	–1
Rashtra Nirman Dal Nepal	39,577	0.37	0	5,030	0.05	0	0	New
Rastriya Janamorcha	29,456	0.27	0	24,793	0.24	0	0	–1
NFSN – Bahujan Ekta Party Nepal – Nepal Janajagriti Party	29,436	0.27	0	10,160	0.10	0	0	–
Nepal Janata Samrakshyan Party	28,424	0.26	0	588	0.01	0	0	–
Pragatisheel Loktantrik Party	24,676	0.23	0	24,939	0.24	0	0	New
Communist Party of Nepal (Maoist)	23,867	0.22	0	32,099	0.30	0	0	–
Mongol National Organisation	20,829	0.19	0	17,898	0.17	0	0	–
Aam Janata Party – Janadesh Party	19,832	0.18	0	19,918	0.19	0	0	New
Sarwabhuam Nagarik Party	14,886	0.14	0	1,716	0.02	0	0	New
Rastriya Mukti Andolan, Nepal	10,725	0.10	0	569	0.01	0	0	New
Samyukta Nagarik Party	9,142	0.08	0	1,866	0.02	0	0	New
Swabhiman Party	8,144	0.08	0	11,404	0.11	0	0	–
Rastriya Janamukti Party	7,208	0.07	0	3,599	0.03	0	0	–
Nepal Janata Party	7,164	0.07	0	2,537	0.02	0	0	–
Rastriya Ekta Dal	7,071	0.07	0	1,455	0.01	0	0	–
Communist Party of Nepal (Marxist–Leninist)	6,172	0.06	0			0	0	–
Rastriya Gaurav Party	5,250	0.05	0			0	0	New
National Republic Nepal	5,160	0.05	0	4,862	0.05	0	0	New
Gatisheel Loktantrik Party	5,101	0.05	0	229	0.00	0	–	–
Nepalka Lagi Nepali Party	5,019	0.05	0	2,881	0.03	0	0	–
Communist Party of Nepal Marxist (Pushpalal)	4,835	0.04	0	408	0.00	0	0	New
Sanghiya Loktantrik Rastriya Manch	4,678	0.04	0	2,129	0.02	0	0	–
Communist Party of Nepal (United)	4,515	0.04	0	1,680	0.02	0	0	–
Rastriya Urjasheel Party, Nepal	4,319	0.04	0	4,304	0.04	0	0	New
Samabeshi Samajbadi Party Nepal	4,288	0.04	0	393	0.00	0	0	New
Nepal Loktantrik Party	4,123	0.04	0	320	0.00	0	0	–
Nepal Matribhumi Party	3,228	0.03	0	23	0.00	0	0	New
Jaya Matribhumi Party	2,948	0.03	0	707	0.01	0	0	New
Rastriya Janata Party Nepal	2,936	0.03	0	13	0.00	0	0	–
Bahujan Shakti Party	2,775	0.03	0	354	0.00	0	0	–
Prajatantrik Party Nepal	2,245	0.02	0	37	0.00	0	0	New
Nepal Janmukti Party	2,172	0.02	0	835	0.01	0	0	New
Jana Adhikar Party	2,117	0.02	0	544	0.01	0	0	New
Nepal Sadbhawana Party	2,018	0.02	0	109	0.00	0	0	–
People First Party	1,800	0.02	0	369	0.00	0	0	New
Nepali Congress (B.P.)	1,789	0.02	0			0	0	–
Nagarik Shakti, Nepal	1,733	0.02	0			0	0	New
Nepali Janashramdan Sanskriti Party	1,639	0.02	0	172	0.00	0	0	New
Nepali Janata Dal	1,455	0.01	0	256	0.00	0	0	–
Samabeshi Samajbadi Party	1,397	0.01	0	234	0.00	0	0	New
Janata Loktantrik Party, Nepal	1,303	0.01	0	77	0.00	0	0	New
Sachet Nepali Party – Nagarik Sarvochhata Party Nepal	1,132	0.01	0	120	0.00	0	0	New
Janapriya Loktantrik Party	955	0.01	0			0	0	New
Miteri Party Nepal	772	0.01	0	383	0.00	0	0	–
Unnat Loktantra Party	730	0.01	0			0	0	New
Trimul Nepal	694	0.01	0	16	0.00	0	0	New
Ujyaalo Nepal Party			0	115,975	1.10	0	0	New
Rastriya Janamat Party			0	953	0.01	0	0	New
Nepal Manabtabadi Party			0	949	0.01	0	0	New
Rastriya Sajha Party			0	191	0.00	0	0	New
Nepal Janasewa Party			0	159	0.00	0	0	–
United Nepal Democratic Party			0	32	0.00	0	0	New
Itihasik Janata Party			0	18	0.00	0	0	New
Communist Party of Nepal (Marxist)			0	16	0.00	0	0	New
National Citizen Party			0	12	0.00	0	0	–
Gandhibadi Party Nepal			0	4	0.00	0	0	–
Independents			0	102,996	0.98	1	1	–2
Total	10,835,025	100.00	110	10,529,154	100.00	165	275	–
Valid votes	10,835,025	96.05		10,559,017	94.55			
Invalid/blank votes	445,592	3.95		609,015	5.45			
Total votes	11,280,617	100.00		11,168,032	100.00			
Registered voters/turnout	18,903,689	59.67		18,903,689	59.08			
Source: Election Commission of Nepal: PR, FPTP

=== Results by constituency ===
Constituency	Elected MP	Party
Achham 1	Bharat Kumar Swar	Congress
Achham 2	Yagya Bahadur Bogati	CPN (UML)
Arghakhanchi 1	Hari Prasad Bhusal	RSP
Baglung 1	Sushil Khadka	RSP
Baglung 2	Som Sharma	RSP
Baitadi 1	Hari Mohan Bhandari	RSP
Bajhang 1	Ain Bahadur Mahar	CPN (UML)
Bajura 1	Janak Raj Giri	Congress
Banke 1	Suresh Kumar Chaudhary	RSP
Banke 2	Mohammad Ishtiyaq Rayi	CPN (UML)
Banke 3	Khagendra Sunar	RSP
Bara 1	Ganesh Dhimal	RSP
Bara 2	Chandan Kumar Singh	RSP
Bara 3	Arvind Sah	RSP
Bara 4	Rahbar Ansari	RSP
Bardiya 1	Thakur Singh Tharu	RSP
Bardiya 2	Shreedhar Pokharel	RSP
Bhaktapur 1	Rukesh Ranjit	RSP
Bhaktapur 2	Rajiv Khatri	RSP
Bhojpur 1	Dhurbaraj Rai	Shram Sanskriti
Chitwan 1	Hari Dhakal	RSP
Chitwan 2	Rabi Lamichhane	RSP
Chitwan 3	Sobita Gautam	RSP
Dadeldhura 1	Tara Prasad Joshi	RSP
Dailekh 1	Basana Thapa	Congress
Dailekh 2	Laxmi Prasad Pokharel	CPN (UML)
Dang 1	Devraj Pathak	RSP
Dang 2	Bipin Kumar Acharya	RSP
Dang 3	Kamal Subedi	RSP
Darchula 1	Ganesh Singh Thagunna	CPN (UML)
Dhading 1	Ashika Tamang	RSP
Dhading 2	Bodh Narayan Shrestha	RSP
Dhankuta 1	Rajendra Kumar Rai	CPN (UML)
Dhanusha 1	Matrika Prasad Yadav	NCP
Dhanusha 2	Ram Binod Yadav	RSP
Dhanusha 3	Manish Jha	RSP
Dhanusha 4	Raj Kishor Mahato	RSP
Dolakha 1	Jagadish Kharel	RSP
Dolpa 1	Dhan Bahadur Buda	NCP
Doti 1	Bharat Bahadur Khadka	Congress
Gorkha 1	Sudan Gurung	RSP
Gorkha 2	Kabindra Burlakoti	RSP
Gulmi 1	Sagar Dhakal	RSP
Gulmi 2	Govinda Panthi	RSP
Humla 1	Jayapati Rokaya	Congress
Ilam 1	Nishkal Rai	Congress
Ilam 2	Suhang Nembang	CPN (UML)
Jajarkot 1	Khadak Bahadur Budha	Congress
Jhapa 1	Nisha Dangi	RSP
Jhapa 2	Indira Rana Magar	RSP
Jhapa 3	Prakash Pathak	RSP
Jhapa 4	Shambhu Prasad Dhakal	RSP
Jhapa 5	Balen Shah	RSP
Jumla 1	Gyanendra Shahi	RPP
Kailali 1	Komal Gyawali	RSP
Kailali 2	K. P. Khanal	RSP
Kailali 3	Jagat Prasad Joshi	RSP
Kailali 4	Khem Raj Koirala	RSP
Kailali 5	Ananda Bahadur Chand	RSP
Kalikot 1	Mahendra Bahadur Shahi	NCP
Kanchanpur 1	Janak Singh Dhami	RSP
Kanchanpur 2	Deepak Raj Bohara	RSP
Kanchanpur 3	Gyanendra Singh Mahata	RSP
Kapilvastu 1	Mohan Lal Acharya	RSP
Kapilvastu 2	Bikram Thapa	RSP
Kapilvastu 3	Abhishek Pratap Shah	Congress
Kaski 1	Khadak Raj Paudel	RSP
Kaski 2	Uttam Prasad Paudel	RSP
Kaski 3	Bina Gurung	RSP
Kathmandu 1	Ranju Darshana	RSP
Kathmandu 2	Sunil K.C.	RSP
Kathmandu 3	Rajunath Pandey	RSP
Kathmandu 4	Pukar Bam	RSP
Kathmandu 5	Sasmit Pokharel	RSP
Kathmandu 6	Shishir Khanal	RSP
Kathmandu 7	Ganesh Parajuli	RSP
Kathmandu 8	Biraj Bhakta Shrestha	RSP
Kathmandu 9	Dol Prasad Aryal	RSP
Kathmandu 10	Pradip Bista	RSP
Kavrepalanchok 1	Madhu Kumar Chaulagain	RSP
Kavrepalanchok 2	Badan Kumar Bhandari	RSP
Khotang 1	Aaren Rai	Shram Sanskriti
Lalitpur 1	Buddha Ratna Maharjan	RSP
Lalitpur 2	Jagdish Kharel	RSP
Lalitpur 3	Toshima Karki	RSP
Lamjung 1	Dharmaraj K.C.	RSP
Mahottari 1	Pramod Kumar Mahato	RSP
Mahottari 2	Dipak Kumar Sah	RSP
Mahottari 3	Ujjawal Kumar Jha	RSP
Mahottari 4	Gauri Kumari	RSP
Makwanpur 1	Prakash Gautam	RSP
Makwanpur 2	Prashant Upreti	RSP
Manang 1	Tek Bahadur Gurung	Congress
Morang 1	Yagyamani Neupane	RSP
Morang 2	Krishna Kumar Karki	RSP
Morang 3	Ganesh Karki	RSP
Morang 4	Santosh Rajbanshi	RSP
Morang 5	Asha Jha	RSP
Morang 6	Rubina Acharya	RSP
Mugu 1	Khadga Shahi	Congress
Mustang 1	Yogesh Gauchan Thakali	Congress
Myagdi 1	Mahabir Pun	Independent
Nawalpur 1	Rajan Gautam	RSP
Nawalpur 2	Manish Khanal	RSP
Nuwakot 1	Bikram Timilsina	RSP
Nuwakot 2	Achuttam Lamichhane	RSP
Okhaldhunga 1	Bishwaraj Pokharel	RSP
Palpa 1	Sandeep Rana	Congress
Palpa 2	Madhav Bahadur Thapa	RSP
Panchthar 1	Narendra Kerung	Congress
Parasi 1	Bikram Khanal	RSP
Parasi 2	Narendra Kumar Gupta	RSP
Parbat 1	Sagar Bhusal	RSP
Parsa 1	Buddhi Prasad Pant	RSP
Parsa 2	Sushil Kumar Kanu	RSP
Parsa 3	Ramakant Prasad Chaurasiya	RSP
Parsa 4	Tek Bahadur Shakya	RSP
Pyuthan 1	Sushant Vaidik	RSP
Ramechhap 1	Krishna Hari Budhathoki	RSP
Rasuwa 1	Mohan Acharya	Congress
Rautahat 1	Rajesh Kumar Chaudhary	RSP
Rautahat 2	Firdosh Alam	Congress
Rautahat 3	Rabindra Patel	RSP
Rautahat 4	Ganesh Paudel	RSP
Rolpa 1	Barshman Pun	NCP
Eastern Rukum 1	Pushpa Kamal Dahal	NCP
Western Rukum 1	Gopal Sharma	NCP
Rupandehi 1	Sunil Lamsal	RSP
Rupandehi 2	Sulabh Kharel	RSP
Rupandehi 3	Lekhjung Thapa	RSP
Rupandehi 4	Kanhaiya Baniya	RSP
Rupandehi 5	Taufique Ahmad Khan	RSP
Salyan 1	Ramesh Kumar Malla	NCP
Sankhuwasabha 1	Arjun Kumar Karki	CPN (UML)
Saptari 1	Pushpa Kumari Chaudhary	RSP
Saptari 2	Ramjee Yadav	RSP
Saptari 3	Amarkant Chaudhary	RSP
Saptari 4	Sitaram Sah	RSP
Sarlahi 1	Nitima Bhandari	RSP
Sarlahi 2	Rabin Mahato	RSP
Sarlahi 3	Narendra Sah Kalwar	RSP
Sarlahi 4	Amresh Kumar Singh	RSP
Sindhuli 1	Dhanendra Karki	RSP
Sindhuli 2	Aashish Gajurel	RSP
Sindhupalchok 1	Bharat Prasad Parajuli	RSP
Sindhupalchok 2	Yubaraj Dulal	NCP
Siraha 1	Bablu Gupta	RSP
Siraha 2	Shiv Shankar Yadav	RSP
Siraha 3	Shambhu Kumar Yadav	RSP
Siraha 4	Tapeshwar Yadav	RSP
Solukhumbu 1	Prakash Singh Karki	Congress
Sunsari 1	Harka Sampang	Shram Sanskriti
Sunsari 2	Lal Bikram Thapa	RSP
Sunsari 3	Ashok Kumar Chaudhary	RSP
Sunsari 4	Deepak Kumar Sah	RSP
Surkhet 1	Bishnu Bahadur Khadka	Congress
Surkhet 2	Ramesh Kumar Sapkota	RSP
Syangja 1	Dhananjaya Regmi	RSP
Syangja 2	Jhabilal Dumre	RSP
Tanahun 1	Swarnim Wagle	RSP
Tanahun 2	Shreeram Neupane	RSP
Taplejung 1	Kshitij Thebe	CPN (UML)
Tehrathum 1	Santosh Subba	Congress
Udayapur 1	Paras Mani Gelal	RSP
Udayapur 2	Surya Bahadur Tamang	RSP
Source: Election Commission of Nepal

=== Results by province ===
==== Proportional results ====
Province	Proportional vote share						
Province	RSP	NC	UML	NCP	SSP	RPP	Other
Koshi	42.63	14.52	14.40	4.88	14.59	3.14	5.84
Madhesh	57.33	12.67	8.28	4.74	0.43	1.57	15.00
Bagmati	51.05	14.65	11.95	8.58	1.44	3.49	8.85
Gandaki	51.57	20.35	14.97	5.68	1.86	2.31	3.26
Lumbini	47.71	16.80	15.16	7.94	1.20	4.09	7.09
Karnali	24.11	25.46	21.79	19.31	0.84	2.84	5.64
Sudurpashchim	37.72	21.70	17.55	11.62	0.63	4.30	6.49

==== Constituency results ====
Province	Total seats	Seats won						
Province	Total seats	RSP	NC	UML	NCP	SSP	RPP	Ind
Koshi	28	17	4	4	0	3	0	0
Madhesh	32	30	1	0	1	0	0	0
Bagmati	33	31	1	0	1	0	0	0
Gandaki	18	15	2	0	0	0	0	1
Lumbini	26	21	2	1	2	0	0	0
Karnali	12	1	5	1	4	0	1	0
Sudurpashchim	16	10	3	3	0	0	0	0
Total	165	125	18	9	8	3	1	1

The Rastriya Swatantra Party secured a landslide victory, winning 182 of the 275 seats in the House of Representatives, falling just 2 short of a supermajority. The party received 47.84% of the proportional vote nationally, emerged as the largest party in first-past-the-post voting in six of the seven provinces and swept all but four seats in the Terai belt. The Nepali Congress performed strongest in Karnali, where it claimed five of the province's twelve seats. The Nepali Communist Party drew the bulk of its support from the traditional Maoist strongholds in Karnali and the former Rapti Zone, but failed to win any seats in Koshi and Gandaki. CPN (UML) relied heavily on its historical base of the Eastern hills, which accounted for four of its nine seats. However, the party faced significant competition in the region from Shram Sanskriti Party, which captured all three of its seats there. Both Nepali Congress and CPN (UML) each won three seats from the upper belts of Sudurpaschim. CPN (UML) won no seats in Madhesh, Bagmati and Gandaki. Mahabir Pun, a former Minister of Education in the post-Gen Z protest cabinet had been backed by the Rastriya Swatantra Party and was the sole independent candidate to win in the election.

== Notable election losses ==
Former prime ministers

- Madhav Kumar Nepal – Rautahat 1 (NCP)
- K. P. Sharma Oli – Jhapa 5 (UML)

Former deputy prime ministers

- Bijay Kumar Gachhadar – Sunsari 3 (Congress)
- Rajendra Prasad Lingden – Jhapa 3 (RPP)
- Raghubir Mahaseth – Dhanusha 4 (UML)
- Rajendra Mahato – Sarlahi 2 (RMPN)
- Bimalendra Nidhi – Dhanusha 3 (Congress)
- Bishnu Prasad Paudel – Rupandehi 2 (UML)
- Ishwar Pokhrel – Kathmandu 5 (UML)
- Narayan Kaji Shrestha – Sarlahi 3 (NCP)
- Kamal Thapa – Kathmandu 5 (RPP)
- Upendra Yadav – Saptari 3 (PSP-N)

Former cabinet ministers

- Prem Bahadur Ale – Kailali 5 (NCP)
- Mahesh Basnet – Bhaktapur 2 (UML)
- Sharat Singh Bhandari – Mahottari 2 (PSP-N)
- Gokarna Bista – Gulmi 2 (UML)
- Bhanu Bhakta Dhakal – Tehrathum 1 (UML)
- Kulman Ghising – Kathmandu 3 (UPN)
- Prithvi Subba Gurung – Lamjung 1 (UML)
- Pradeep Kumar Gyawali – Gulmi 1 (UML)
- Pradip Paudel – Kathmandu 5 (Congress)
- Janardan Sharma – Eastern Rukum 1 (PLP)
- Gagan Kumar Thapa – Sarlahi 4 (Congress)

Former Speaker of the House

- Dev Raj Ghimire – Jhapa 2 (UML)

Former chief ministers

- Trilochan Bhatta – Doti 1 (NCP)
- Kul Prasad KC – Dang 1 (Independent)
- Rajendra Prasad Pandey – Dhading 1 (NCP)
- Shankar Pokharel – Dang 2 (UML)
- Sher Dhan Rai – Bhojpur 1 (UML)
- Satish Kumar Singh – Saptari 2 (Swabhiman)

Former mayor of metropolitan city

- Renu Dahal – Chitwan 3 (NCP)

Party leaders

- CK Raut – Saptari 2 (Janamat)
- Prabhu Sah – Rautahat 3 (AJP)

== Seats changing hands ==
Congress to RSP (39)

- Banke 3
- Bhaktapur 2
- Dadeldhura 1
- Dang 3
- Dhanusha 2
- Dhading 2
- Gorkha 1
- Gulmi 1
- Jhapa 1
- Kailali 4
- Kailali 5
- Kanchanpur 2
- Kanchanpur 3
- Kapilvastu 2
- Kathmandu 1
- Kathmandu 3
- Kathmandu 4
- Kathmandu 5
- Kathmandu 10
- Lalitpur 1
- Morang 1
- Morang 3
- Morang 6
- Nawalpur 1
- Nawalpur 2
- Nuwakot 2
- Parasi 1
- Okhaldhunga
- Parsa 2
- Parsa 4
- Rautahat 4
- Saptari 3
- Saptari 4
- Sindhuli 1
- Surkhet 2
- Syangja 1
- Syangja 2
- Tanahun 2
- Udayapur 1

Congress to CPN (UML) (4)

- Achham 2
- Dailekh 2
- Darchula 1
- Sankhuwasabha 1

Congress to NCP (1)

- Sindhupalchok 2

Congress to Independent (1)

- Myagdi 1

CPN (UML) to RSP (33)

- Arghakhanchi 1
- Baitadi 1
- Banke 1
- Bara 1
- Bara 3
- Dhanusha 3
- Dhanusha 4
- Gulmi 2
- Jhapa 4
- Jhapa 5
- Kanchanpur 1
- Kapilvastu 1
- Kathmandu 9
- Kaski 1
- Kaski 2
- Kaski 3
- Kavrepalanchok 2
- Lalitpur 2
- Lamjung 1
- Mahottari 1
- Makwanpur 2
- Morang 2
- Palpa 2
- Parbat 1
- Parsa 3
- Pyuthan 1
- Rupandehi 1
- Rupandehi 2
- Rupandehi 5
- Sarlahi 3
- Siraha 3
- Sunsari 3
- Udayapur 2

CPN (UML) to Congress (5)

- Ilam 1
- Kapilvastu 3
- Panchthar
- Rautahat 2
- Solukhumbu

Maoist Centre to RSP (9)

- Baglung 2
- Dang 2
- Dolakha 1
- Gorkha 2
- Kavrepalanchok 1
- Morang 4
- Sarlahi 2
- Sindhuli 2
- Sindhupalchok 1

Maoist Centre to Congress (2)

- Jajarkot 1
- Humla 1

Maoist Centre to SSP (2)

- Bhojpur 1
- Khotang 1

Unified Socialist to RSP (4)

- Bara 4
- Dang 1
- Dhading 1
- Rautahat 1

Unified Socialist to Congress (3)

- Achham 1
- Dailekh 1
- Doti 1

Unified Socialist to CPN (UML) (1)

- Bajhang 1

Nagarik Unmukti to RSP (4)

- Bardiya 1
- Kailali 1
- Kailali 2
- Kailali 3

RPP to RSP (4)

- Jhapa 3
- Makwanpur 1
- Nawalparasi 2
- Rupandehi 3

RPP to CPN (UML) (1)

- Banke 2

Loktantrik Samajwadi to RSP (4)

- Mahottari 2
- Mahottari 3
- Rupandehi 4
- Sarlahi 1

PSP-N to RSP (2)

- Bara 3
- Saptari 1
- Siraha 4

PSP-N to NCP (1)

- Dhanusha 1

PSP to RSP (1)

- Parsa 1

PSP to SSP (1)

- Sunsari 1

NMKP to RSP (1)

- Bhaktapur 1

Janamorcha to RSP (1)

- Baglung 1

AJP to RSP (1)

- Rautahat 3

Independent to RSP (2)

- Morang 5
- Sarlahi 4

== International reactions ==
- Bhutan: Prime Minister Tshering Tobgay congratulated Lamichhane and Shah on social media.
- China: The Chinese Communist Party extended congratulations to Lamichhane and Shah and expressed readiness to work together by deepening political mutual trust, Belt and Road Initiative cooperation, and a shared future for the benefits of both countries.
- India: Prime Minister Narendra Modi congratulated Lamichhane and Shah on the party's victory and emphasised strong relations between India and Nepal.
- Maldives: President Mohamed Muizzu congratulated Shah on the party's victory and highlighted large-scale participation of the youth reaffirming the shared goals and common challenges shared by South Asian Nations.
- Pakistan: Prime Minister Shehbaz Sharif congratulated Lamichhane and Shah on social media.

== See also ==
- List of political parties in Nepal
- Politics of Nepal
- 2022 Nepalese general election
