= Janadesh Party =

Mandate Party जनादेश पार्टी
- Leader: Rishi Dhamala
- Chairperson: Raman Kumar Karna
- Founded: October 2025
- Headquarters: Kathmandu
- Ideology: Democratic socialism Federalism
- Political position: Centre-left to left-wing
- Colours: Blue, white
- ECN Status: Registered Party

Election symbol

The Janadesh Party (Nepali: जनादेश पार्टी, lit. 'Mandate Party') is a political party in Nepal chaired by senior advocate Raman Kumar Karna formed after the 2025 Nepalese Gen Z protests.

== See also ==
- Rishi Dhamala
- Aam Janata Party
