= Dhamala =

Dhamala (धमला) is a Nepalese surname traditionally associated with the Khas people of the Bahun (Khas Brahmin) community, belonging to the Dhananjaya gotra.

Notable people with the surname include:

- Rishi Dhamala (born 1964), Nepalese journalist
- Tika Dhamala, Major General Nepal Army; ADC to King Birendra and Gyanendra of Nepal
- Sunil Dhamala (born 1997), Nepalese cricketer
