= Ramesh Kumar Malla =

Nepalese politician

- रमेश कुमार मल्ल

Member of Parliament, Pratinidhi Sabha
- Incumbent
- Assumed office 26 March 2026
- Preceded by: Prakash Jwala
- Constituency: Salyan 1

Personal details
- Born: 11 February 1979 (age 47) Kumakh, Salyan District, Nepal
- Party: Nepali Communist Party
- Other political affiliations: CPN (Maoist Centre)
- Spouse: Anjana Malla
- Parents: Tilu Malla (father); Bimi Kumari Malla (mother)

Ramesh Kumar Malla is a Nepalese politician currently serving as a member of Parliament (MP) for Salyan 1 from the Nepali Communist Party.

== Political career ==
Malla was a member of the All Nepal National Independent Students' Union (Revolutionary) in 1993. He gained membership of CPN (Maoist) in 1997. He became the district president of ANNISU (Revolutionary) in 1999. He was stationed in Seti and Mahakali for four years during the Civil War. He became a central chair of ANNISU (Revolutionary) in 2014 and also became a central committee member of UCPN (Maoist).

He was the personal secretary to Pushpa Kamal Dahal during his second and third term as prime minister.

Malla was elected to the Pratinidhi Sabha from Salyan 1 at the 2026 general election.
