= Asha Jha =

Nepalese politician

Honourable Asha Jha
- आशा झा

Member of Parliament, Pratinidhi Sabha
- Incumbent
- Assumed office 26 March 2026
- Preceded by: Yogendra Mandal
- Constituency: Morang 5

Personal details
- Citizenship: Nepalese
- Party: Rastriya Swatantra Party
- Education: Tribhuvan University (B.Ed)
- Profession: Politician

Asha Jha (Nepali: आशा झा) is a Nepalese politician serving as a member of parliament from the Rastriya Swatantra Party. She is the member of the 7th Pratinidhi Sabha elected from Morang 5 constituency in 2026 Nepalese General Election securing 30,434 votes and defeating her closest contender Phul Kumar Lalwani of the Nepali Congress.

Jha has been active in social and public health campaigns raising the issues related to the rights, legal awareness and citizenship of Madhesi women while being associated with the Madhesi Mahila Nagarik Samaj. She holds Bachelor's degree in Education from Tribhuvan University.
