= Morang 4 =

Parliamentary constituency in Nepal

- Parliamentary constituency
- Morang 4 in Province No. 1
- Province: Koshi Province
- District: Morang District

Current constituency
- Created: 1991
- Party: Rastriya Swatantra Party
- Member of Parliament: Santosh Rajbanshi
- Member of the Provincial Assembly: Bijay Kumar Bishwara, CPN (MC)
- Member of the Provincial Assembly: Jeevan Ghimire, CPN (UML)

Morang 4 is one of six parliamentary constituencies of Morang District in Nepal. This constituency came into existence on the Constituency Delimitation Commission (CDC) report submitted on 31 August 2017.

== Incorporated areas ==
Morang 4 incorporates Gramthan Rural Municipality, Kathahari Rural Municipality, wards 5–7 of Belbari Municipality and wards 1–3, 8 and 10 of Biratnagar Metropolitan City.

== Assembly segments ==
It encompasses the following Province No. 1 Provincial Assembly segment

- Morang 4(A)
- Morang 4(B)

== Members of Parliament ==
=== Parliament/Constituent Assembly ===
Election	Member	Party
1991	Harka Man Tamang	CPN (Unified Marxist–Leninist)
2008	Ram Nanda Mandal	Madheshi Janaadhikar Forum, Nepal
June 2009	Ram Nanda Mandal	Madheshi Janaadhikar Forum, Nepal (Democratic)
2013	Shiva Kumar Mandal	UCPN (Maoist)
May 2016	Shiva Kumar Mandal	CPN (Maoist Centre)
2017	Aman Lal Modi	CPN (Maoist Centre)
May 2018	Aman Lal Modi	Nepal Communist Party
March 2021	Aman Lal Modi	CPN (Maoist Centre)
2022	Aman Lal Modi	CPN (Maoist Centre)
2026	Santosh Rajbanshi	Rastriya Swatantra Party

=== Provincial Assembly ===
==== 4(A) ====
Election	Member	Party
2017	Bijay Kumar Bishwara	CPN (Maoist Centre)
May 2018	Bijay Kumar Bishwara	Nepal Communist Party
March 2021	Bijay Kumar Bishwara	CPN (Maoist Centre)

==== 4(B) ====
Election	Member	Party
2017	Jiwan Ghimire	CPN (Unified Marxist-Leninist)
May 2018	Jiwan Ghimire	Nepal Communist Party
March 2021	Jiwan Ghimire	CPN (Unified Marxist–Leninist)

== Election results ==
=== Election in the 2020s ===
==== 2026 general election ====
Candidate	Party	Votes	%
Santosh Rajbanshi	Rastriya Swatantra Party	40,833	54.79
Gururaj Ghimire	Nepali Congress	12,818	17.20
Aman Lal Modi	Nepali Communist Party	10,762	14.44
Jivan Ghimire	CPN (UML)	6,933	9.30
Madhav Prasad Acharya	Rastriya Prajatantra Party	1,163	1.56
Krishna Kumar Atal	Shram Sanskriti Party	1,001	1.34
Others		1,018	1.37
Total		74,528	100.00
Majority		28,015	
Rastriya Swatantra Party gain			

==== 2022 general election ====
Candidate	Party	Votes	%
Aman Lal Modi	CPN (Maoist Centre)	30,612	43.56
Binod Prasad Dhakal	CPN (UML)	24,463	34.81
Ravi Rijal	Rastriya Prajatantra Party	7,468	10.63
Netra Prasad Siwakoti	Rastriya Swatantra Party	5,333	7.59
Others		2,407	3.42
Total		70,283	100.00
Majority		6,149	
CPN (Maoist Centre) hold			

=== Election in the 2010s ===
==== 2017 legislative elections ====
Party	Candidate	Votes
CPN (Maoist Centre)	Aman Lal Modi	33,529
Nepali Congress	Mahesh Acharya	26,800
Rastriya Janata Party Nepal	Laxman Sahu	3,401
Unified Rastriya Prajatantra Party (Nationalist)	Maheshwar Kamat	1,050
Others		2,149
Invalid votes		4,129
Result	Maoist Centre hold	
Source: Election Commission

==== 2017 Nepalese provincial elections ====
===== 4(A) =====
Party	Candidate	Votes
CPN (Maoist Centre)	Bijay Kumar Bishwara	18,289
Nepali Congress	Bhakti Nath Majhi Tharu	15,223
Federal Socialist Forum, Nepal	Ratan Yadav	1,374
Rastriya Janata Party Nepal	Firoz Sheikh	1,238
Others		1,389
Invalid votes		2,117
Result	Maoist Centre gain	
Source: Election Commission

===== 4(B) =====
Party	Candidate	Votes
CPN (Unified Marxist–Leninist)	Jiwan Ghimire	13,805
Nepali Congress	Bishwanath Rijal	11,625
Federal Socialist Forum, Nepal	Shriram Kamat	3,621
Others		868
Invalid votes		1,367
Result	CPN (UML) gain	
Source: Election Commission

==== 2013 Constituent Assembly election ====
Party	Candidate	Votes
UCPN (Maoist)	Shiva Kumar Mandal	9,360
Nepali Congress	Gyan Nanda Mandal Gandai	9,352
CPN (Unified Marxist–Leninist)	Gyaneshwar Rajbanshi	7,730
Madheshi Janaadhikar Forum, Nepal	Raj Kumar Yadav	4,057
Rastriya Prajatantra Party	Birat Thapa	1,768
Rastriya Madhesh Samajbadi Party	Bikram Ram Subedi	1,453
Madheshi Janaadhikar Forum, Nepal (Democratic)	Dilip Kumar Ghadewa	1,228
Others		3,527
Result	Maoist gain	
Source: NepalNews

=== Election in the 2000s ===
==== 2008 Constituent Assembly election ====
Party	Candidate	Votes
Madheshi Janaadhikar Forum, Nepal	Ram Nanda Mandal	9,894
CPN (Maoist)	Shiva Kumar Mandal	9,414
Nepali Congress	Gayananda Mandal Gangai	8,189
CPN (Unified Marxist–Leninist)	Gyaneshwar Rajbanshi	6,459
Sadbhavana Party	Dilip Kumar Dhadewa	3,782
CPN (Marxist–Leninist)	Saroj Sapkota	1,883
Others		3,054
Invalid votes		3,370
Result	MJFN gain	
Source: Election Commission

=== Election in the 1990s ===
==== 1999 legislative elections ====
Party	Candidate	Votes
CPN (Unified Marxist–Leninist)	Harka Man Tamang	22,944
Nepali Congress	Dilip Sapkota	19,330
CPN (Marxist–Leninist)	Rup Narayan Shrestha	2,219
Janamukti Party Nepal	Kumar Lingden	1,941
Rastriya Janamukti Party	Dhandhoj Limbu	1,448
Others		797
Invalid Votes		1,227
Result	CPN (UML) hold	
Source: Election Commission

==== 1994 legislative elections ====
Party	Candidate	Votes
CPN (Unified Marxist–Leninist)	Harka Man Tamang	12,393
Nepali Congress	Dilip Sapkota	17,674
Rastriya Prajatantra Party	Surendra Bahadur Basnet	3,766
Rastriya Janamukti Party	Ram Kaji Rai	3,623
Others		519
Result	CPN (UML) hold	
Source: Election Commission

==== 1991 legislative elections ====
Party	Candidate	Votes
CPN (Unified Marxist–Leninist)	Harka Man Tamang	27,633
Nepali Congress	Chiranjibi Rijal	15,705
Result	CPN (UML) gain	

== See also ==
- List of parliamentary constituencies of Nepal
