= Santosh Rajbanshi =

Nepalese politician

The Honourable Santosh Rajbanshi
- सन्तोष राजबंशी

Member of Parliament, Pratinidhi Sabha
- Incumbent
- Assumed office 26 March 2026
- Preceded by: Aman Lal Modi
- Constituency: Morang 4

Personal details
- Citizenship: Nepalese
- Party: Rastriya Swatantra Party
- Education: Political Science; Journalism (BA)
- Profession: Politician

Santosh Rajbanshi (Nepali: सन्तोष राजबंशी) is a Nepalese politician serving as a member of parliament from the Rastriya Swatantra Party. He is the member of the 7th Pratinidhi Sabha elected from Morang 4 constituency in 2026 Nepalese General Election securing 40,833 votes and defeating his closest contender Gururaj Ghimire of the Nepali Congress. He holds bachelor's degree in journalism and political science.
