= Bharat Bahadur Khadka =

Nepalese politician

Honourable Bharat Bahadur Khadka
- भरत बहादुर खड्का

Member of Parliament, Pratinidhi Sabha
- Assuming office TBD
- Succeeding: Prem Ale
- Constituency: Doti 1

Province Assembly Member of Sudurpashchim Province
- In office 2017–2022
- Preceded by: Assembly Created
- Constituency: Doti 1 (A)

Personal details
- Party: Nepali Congress
- Occupation: Politician

Bharat Bahadur Khadka is a Nepali politician belonging to Nepali Congress and a former member of Sudurpashchim Provincial Assembly having been elected from Doti 1 (A). He is also a former member of 2nd Nepalese Constituent Assembly.

== Electoral history ==
=== 2017 Nepalese provincial elections ===
==== Doti 1(A) ====
Party	Candidate	Votes
Nepali Congress	Bharat Bahadur Khadka	17,406
CPN (Unified Marxist-Leninist)	Chakra Bahadur Malla	16,792
Others		674
Invalid votes		1,961
Result	Congress gain	
Source: Election Commission
