= Sandeep Rana =

Nepali politician

- सन्दीप राना

Member of the House of Representatives
- Incumbent
- Assumed office 2026
- Preceded by: Narayan Prasad Acharya
- Constituency: Palpa 1
- Majority: 1,517

Personal details
- Party: Nepali Congress
- Occupation: Politician

Sandeep Rana (Nepali: सन्दीप राना) is a Nepali politician affiliated with the Nepali Congress. He is a member of the House of Representatives, representing Palpa constituency 1 following his victory in the 2026 Nepalese general election.

== Political career ==
Rana was elected to the House of Representatives from Palpa 1 as a candidate of the Nepali Congress in the 2026 general election. He defeated CPN (UML) candidate Narayan Prasad Acharya.

His victory marked the Nepali Congress's first win in the constituency in over three decades.

According to Nepal News, Rana secured 18,336 votes, winning by a margin of 1,517 votes.

He was also listed among Nepali Congress candidates from Lumbini Province during the election cycle.

== Electoral history ==
| Year | Election | Constituency | Party | Votes | Opponent | Margin | Result |
|---|---|---|---|---|---|---|---|
| 2026 | 2026 Nepalese general election | Palpa 1 | Nepali Congress | 18,336 | Narayan Prasad Acharya (CPN (UML)) | 1,517 | Elected |

== See also ==
- Nepali Congress
- 2026 Nepalese general election
- House of Representatives (Nepal)
