= Aman Lal Modi =

Nepalese Politician

Honourable Aman Lal Modi
- अमन लाल मोदी

Minister of Federal Affairs and General Administration
- In office 17 January 2023 – 14 August 2023
- President: Bidhya Devi Bhandari; Ram Chandra Poudel
- Prime Minister: Pushpa Kamal Dahal
- Preceded by: Rajendra Prasad Shrestha
- Succeeded by: Anita Devi Sah

Member of Parliament, Pratinidhi Sabha
- In office 4 March 2018 – 12 September 2025
- Preceded by: Shiva Kumar Mandal
- Succeeded by: Santosh Rajbanshi
- Constituency: Morang 4

Member of Constituency Assembly for the CPN (MC) Party List
- In office 21 January 2014 – 14 October 2017
- Preceded by: Shiva Kumar Mandal Kewat

Personal details
- Born: 21 September 1985 (age 40) Dangraha–4, Morang District
- Party: Nepal Communist Party (2018–present)
- Other political affiliations: CPN (Maoist Centre) (until 2018)

Aman Lal Modi (Nepali: अमन लाल मोदी; born 21 September 1985) is a Nepalese politician and social worker serving as a member of House of Representatives from Morang 4. He was also a member of the 2nd Nepalese Constituent Assembly after being elected from the party list of the then Unified CPN (Maoist).

== Early life ==
Modi was born in Dangraha–4 (present day Budhiganga) in Morang District. He completed his bachelor's degree from Mahendra Morang Adarsh Multiple Campus.

== Political career ==
In 2003, Modi was elected as the district chairman of the All Nepal National Independent Students' Union (Revolutionary). He was a member of the Public Accounts Committee in the House of Representatives. In January 2014, he was elected as a member of then Constituent Assembly for the party list of the then Unified CPN (Maoist) and continued to be its member till its dissolution in October 2017.

He was elected to the Pratinidhi Sabha in the 2017 general election from the Morang 4 constituency and was subsequently re-elected in 2022. On 17 January 2023, he was appointed as the Minister of Federal Affairs and General Administration in the Third Dahal Cabinet under the premiership of Pushpa Kamal Dahal.
