= Tara Prasad Joshi =

Nepalese politician

- ताराप्रसाद जोशी
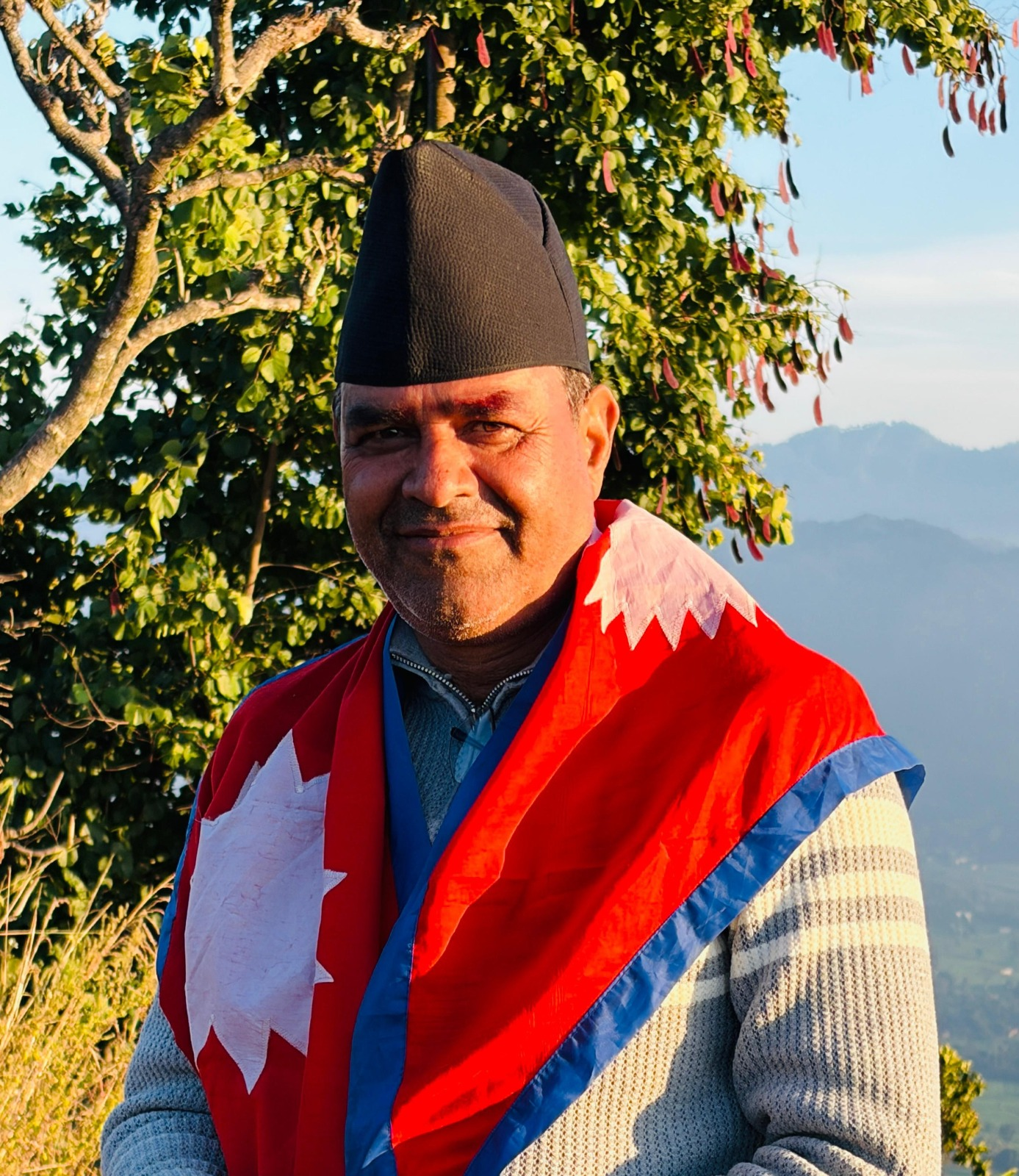

Member of Parliament, Pratinidhi Sabha
- Incumbent
- Assumed office 26 March 2026
- Preceded by: Sher Bahadur Deuba
- Constituency: Dadeldhura 1

Member of the Sudurpashchim Provincial Assembly
- In office 30 December 2022 – 19 January 2026
- Constituency: Dadeldhura 1(B)

Personal details
- Born: 12 April 1971 (age 55)
- Party: Rastriya Swatantra Party
- Other political affiliations: CPN (UML) (until 2022); Independent (2022-2025); Ujyaalo Nepal Party (2025-2026)
- Spouse: Shanti Joshi
- Children: 2
- Parents: Late Bhawani Datta Joshi (father); Late Harina Devi Joshi (mother)
- Relatives: Laxmi Joshi, Kam Dev Joshi, Dharma Joshi, Yadav Joshi (Brothers)
- Education: Siddhanath Campus, Mahendranagar (Bachelor's); Kumaun University (master's); Jawaharlal Nehru University (PhD)
- Website: https://tarajoshi.com.np

Dr. Tara Prasad Joshi (Note: Nepali: ताराप्रसाद जोशी) is a Nepalese politician is currently serving as a member of the 7th Pratinidhi Sabha. In the 2026 Nepalese general election he was elected as a representative of people in Dadeldhura assembly belonging to the Rastriya Swatantra Party.

Earlier he serves he serves as a member of the Sudurpashchim Provincial Assembly. Joshi was elected from Dadeldhura 1(B) constituency belonging to independent.

== Personal life ==
Joshi was born on 30 Chaitra 2027 in Ganyapadhura Rural Municipality-2, Bajangaun, Dadeldhura. He has a PhD in International Relations from Jawaharlal Nehru University, India. He was also the district president of UML Dadeldhura in 2069 BS. He was defeated by former Congress president Deuba in the 2070 BS Constituent Assembly election. Joshi, who lost to Karna Bahadur Malla in the 2074 BS Provincial Assembly election, was elected as an independent candidate in the 2079 BS Provincial Assembly election.
