= Yogendra Mandal =

Nepalese politician

Honourable Yogendra Mandal

Member of Parliament, Pratinidhi Sabha
- In office 2022 – 12 September 2025
- Preceded by: Shiva Kumar Mandal
- Succeeded by: Asha Jha
- Constituency: Morang 5 (constituency)

Personal details
- Party: Rastriya Urjasheel Party Nepal

Yogendra Mandal is a Nepalese politician, currently serving as a member of the 2nd Federal Parliament of Nepal. He is also the chairperson of Rastriya Urjasheel Party Nepal. In the 2022 Nepalese general election, he won the election from Morang 5.

== Rastriya Urjasheel Party Nepal ==
Rastriya Urjasheel Party Nepal राष्ट्रिय ऊर्जाशील पार्टी नेपाल
- President: Yogendra Mandal
- Founded: 2025
- Headquarters: Kathmandu

Election symbol
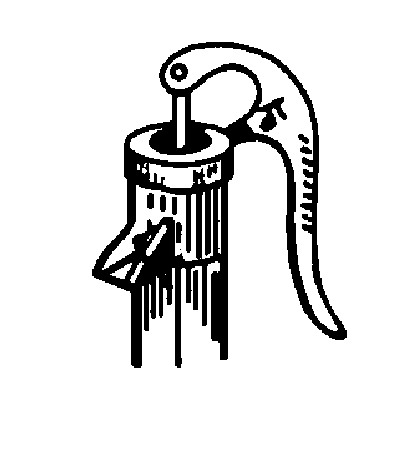

The Rastriya Urjasheel Party Nepal (Nepali: राष्ट्रिय ऊर्जाशील पार्टी नेपाल, lit. 'National Energetic Party Nepal') is a political party in Nepal led by Yogendra Mandal, MP of Morang 5.

== Electoral history ==
=== 2022 general election ===
Candidate	Party	Votes	%
Yogendra Mandal	Independent	21,820	32.38
Shiva Kumar Mandal	CPN (Maoist Centre)	17,486	25.95
Raj Kumar Yadav	People's Socialist Party, Nepal	17,390	25.81
Rewat Bahadur Thapa	Rastriya Prajatantra Party	2,479	3.68
Parmeshwar Murmu	Janamat Party	2,395	3.55
Pramod Kumar Mandal	Rastriya Swatantra Party	2,282	3.39
Mohammad Reza Hussein	Independent	1,900	2.82
Others		1,628	2.42
Total		67,380	100.00
Majority		4,334	
Independent gain			

== See also ==
- Rastriya Urjasheel Party Nepal
