= Morang 5 =

Parliamentary constituency in Nepal

- Parliamentary constituency
- Morang 5 in Province No. 1
- Province: Province No. 1
- District: Morang District

Current constituency
- Created: 1991
- Party: Rastriya Swatantra Party
- Member of Parliament: Asha Jha
- Member of the Provincial Assembly: Gyanesdwar Rajbanshi, CPN (UML)
- Member of the Provincial Assembly: Jay Ram Yadav, PSP-N

Morang 5 is one of six parliamentary constituencies of Morang District in Nepal. This constituency came into existence on the Constituency Delimitation Commission (CDC) report submitted on 31 August 2017.

== Incorporated areas ==
Morang 5 incorporates Dhanpalthan Rural Municipality, Jahada Rural Municipality, wards 4–7 of Rangeli Municipality and wards 13–18 of Biratnagar Metropolitan City.

== Assembly segments ==
It encompasses the following Province No. 1 Provincial Assembly segment

- Morang 5(A)
- Morang 5(B)

== Members of Parliament ==
=== Parliament/Constituent Assembly ===
Election	Member	Party
1991	Shailaja Acharya	Nepali Congress
1994	Kamal Prasad Koirala	CPN (Unified Marxist–Leninist)
1999	Mahesh Acharya	Nepali Congress
2008	Upendra Yadav	Madheshi Janaadhikar Forum, Nepal
2009 by-election	Jay Ram Yadav	Madheshi Janaadhikar Forum, Nepal
2013	Amrit Kumar Aryal	Nepali Congress
2017	Shiva Kumar Mandal	CPN (Maoist Centre)
May 2018	Shiva Kumar Mandal	Nepal Communist Party
March 2021	Shiva Kumar Mandal	CPN (Maoist Centre)
2022	Yogendra Mandal	Independent
2026	Asha Jha	Rastriya Swatantra Party

=== Provincial Assembly ===
==== 5(A) ====
Election	Member	Party
2017	Gyaneshwar Rajbanshi	CPN (Unified Marxist–Leninist)
May 2018	Gyaneshwar Rajbanshi	Nepal Communist Party
March 2021	Gyaneshwar Rajbanshi	CPN (Unified Marxist–Leninist)

==== 5(B) ====
Election	Member	Party
2017	Jay Ram Yadav	Federal Socialist Forum, Nepal
May 2019	Jay Ram Yadav	Samajbadi Party, Nepal
April 2020	Jay Ram Yadav	People's Socialist Party, Nepal

== Election results ==
=== Election in the 2020s ===
==== 2026 general election ====
Candidate	Party	Votes	%
Aasha Jha	RSP	30,434	43.05
Phool Kumar Lalbani	Congress	9,415	13.32
Raj Kumar Yadav	PSP-N	8,747	12.37
Shiva Kumar Mandal	NCP	8,614	12.18
Manoj Agrawal	CPN-(UML)	6,945	9.82
Yogendra Mandal	RSP, N	4,199	5.94
Kumud Raya	RPP	549	0.78
Others		1,796	2.54
Total		70,699	100.00
Registered voters/turnout			–
Majority		21,019	
RSP gain			

==== 2022 general election ====
Candidate	Party	Votes	%
Yogendra Mandal	Independent	21,820	32.38
Shiva Kumar Mandal	CPN (Maoist Centre)	17,486	25.95
Raj Kumar Yadav	People's Socialist Party, Nepal	17,390	25.81
Rewat Bahadur Thapa	Rastriya Prajatantra Party	2,479	3.68
Parmeshwar Murmu	Janamat Party	2,395	3.55
Pramod Kumar Mandal	Rastriya Swatantra Party	2,282	3.39
Mohammad Reza Hussein	Independent	1,900	2.82
Others		1,628	2.42
Total		67,380	100.00
Majority		4,334	
Independent gain			

=== Election in the 2010s ===
==== 2017 legislative elections ====
Party	Candidate	Votes
CPN (Maoist Centre)	Shiva Kumar Mandal	22,945
Nepali Congress	Amrit Kumar Aryal	19,153
Federal Socialist Forum, Nepal	Raj Kumar Yadav	18,649
Rastriya Janata Party Nepal	Badri Prasad Mandal	1,895
Others		1,287
Invalid votes		4,363
Result	Maoist Centre gain	
Source: Election Commission

==== 2017 Nepalese provincial elections ====
===== 5(A) =====
Party	Candidate	Votes
CPN (Unified Marxist–Leninist)	Gyaneshwar Rajbanshi	12,861
Nepali Congress	Shukradev Prasad Mandal	8,828
Federal Socialist Forum, Nepal	Bijay Kumar Singh	8,573
Rastriya Janata Party Nepal	Shankar Prasad Sah	1,157
Others		189
Invalid votes		1,682
Result	CPN (UML) gain	
Source: Election Commission

===== 5(B) =====
Party	Candidate	Votes
Federal Socialist Forum, Nepal	Jay Ram Yadav	11,201
Nepali Congress	Rajesh Kumar Gupta	9,918
CPN (Maoist Centre)	Shubhan Miyan	8,665
Rastriya Janata Party Nepal	Bhogendra Yadav	1,231
Others		1,817
Invalid votes		2,078
Result	FSFN gain	
Source: Election Commission

==== 2013 Constituent Assembly election ====
Party	Candidate	Votes
Nepali Congress	Amrit Kumar Aryal	15,254
Madheshi Janaadhikar Forum, Nepal	Upendra Yadav	12,566
UCPN (Maoist)	Baleshwar Kamat	3,780
CPN (Unified Marxist–Leninist)	Ram Lal Sah	2,563
Madheshi Janaadhikar Forum, Nepal (Democratic)	Basanta Lal Rajbanshi	1,114
Sadbhavana Party	Badri Pasad Mandal	1,112
Others		4,820
Result	Congress gain	
Source: NepalNews

=== Election in the 2000s ===
==== 2009 by-elections ====
Candidate	Party	Votes	%
Jay Ram Yadav	Madheshi Jana Adhikar Forum, Nepal	13,811	35.68
Shiva Kumar Mandal	UCPN (Maoist)	9,101	23.51
Jagannath Singh	Nepali Congress	5,544	14.32
Jeevan Ghimire	CPN (UML)	3,586	9.26
Umesh Giri	Terai Madhesh Loktantrik Party	2,801	7.24
Others	3,865	9.99	
Total		38,708	100.00
Valid votes		38,708	99.34
Invalid/blank votes		256	0.66
Total votes		38,964	100.00
Registered voters/turnout		67,397	57.81
Majority		4,710	
Madheshi Jana Adhikar Forum, Nepal hold			
Source: Election Commission

==== 2008 Constituent Assembly election ====
Party	Candidate	Votes
Madheshi Janaadhikar Forum, Nepal	Upendra Yadav	27,508
Nepali Congress	Amrit Kumar Aryal	10,324
CPN (Maoist)	Rajendra Prasad Gupta	3,616
CPN (Unified Marxist–Leninist)	Mina Devi Yadav	2,224
Others		2,387
Invalid votes		2,026
Result	MJFN gain	
Source: Election Commission

=== Election in the 1990s ===
==== 1999 legislative elections ====
Party	Candidate	Votes
Nepali Congress	Mahesh Acharya	19,119
CPN (Unified Marxist–Leninist)	Subodh Raj Pyakurel	15,450
Rastriya Prajatantra Party	Surendra Bahadur Basnet	9,329
Independent	Satya Narayan Chaudhary	1,941
Nepal Sadbhawana Party	Anirudh Prasad Bishwas	1,465
Rastriya Prajatantra Party (Chand)	Paladh Prasad Shah	1,131
Others		1,857
Invalid Votes		1,444
Result	Congress gain	
Source: Election Commission

==== 1994 legislative elections ====
Party	Candidate	Votes
CPN (Unified Marxist–Leninist)	Kamal Prasad Koirala	14,106
Nepali Congress	Shyam Lal Tabdar	10,357
Rastriya Prajatantra Party	Krishna Bahadur Bhattarai	4,013
Others		6,697
Result	CPN (UML) gain	
Source: Election Commission

==== 1991 legislative elections ====
Party	Candidate	Votes
Nepali Congress	Shailaja Acharya	19,769
CPN (Unified Marxist–Leninist)	Kamal Prasad Koirala	10,537
Result	Congress gain	

== See also ==
- List of parliamentary constituencies of Nepal
