= Doti 1 =

Parliamentary constituency in Nepal

- Parliamentary constituency for the House of Representatives
- Doti 1 in Sudurpashchim Province; Protected areas in green

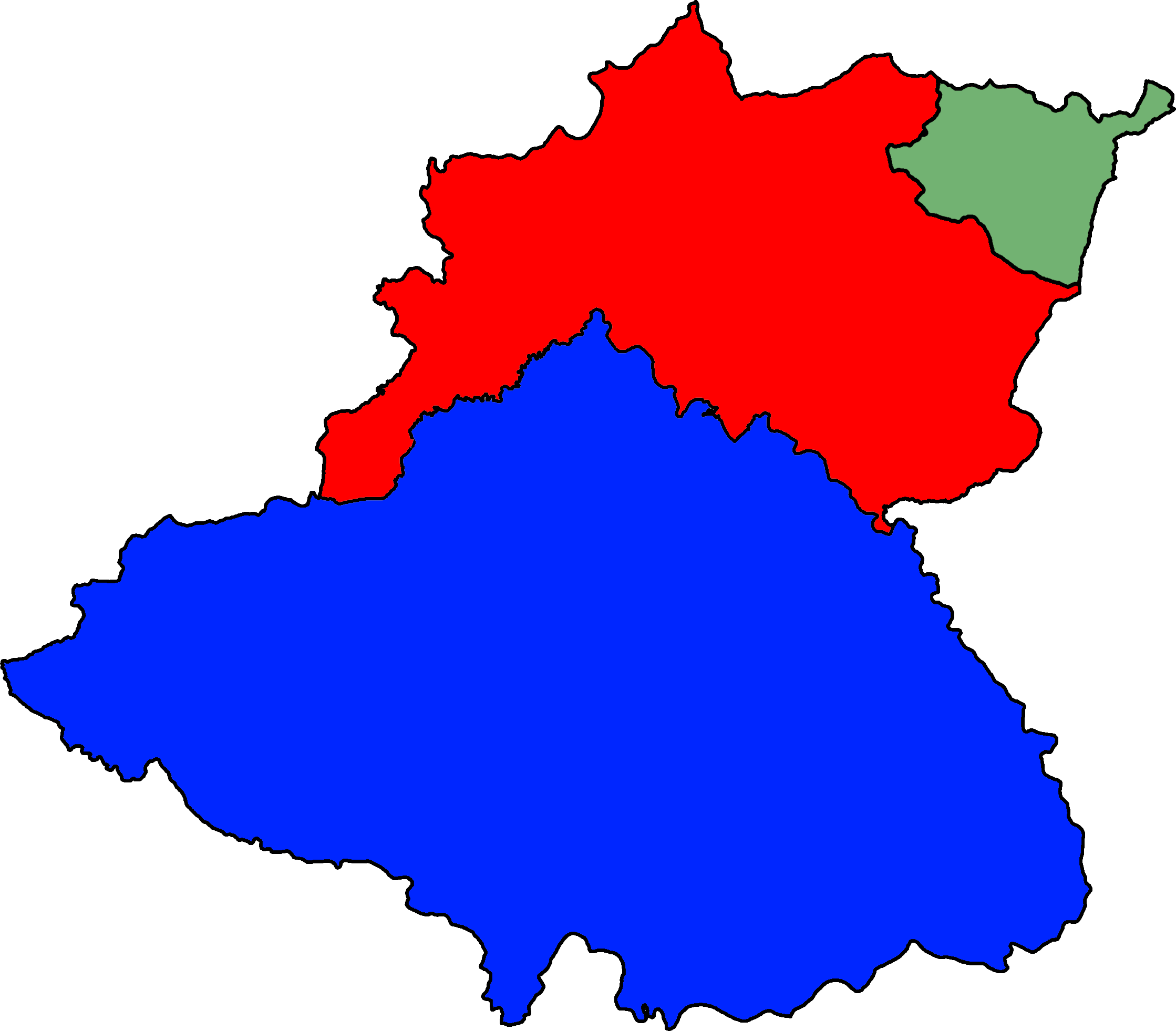
- Assembly segments Doti 1(A) (red) and Doti 1(B) (blue) within Doti District; Protected areas in green
- Province: Sudurpashchim Province
- District: Doti District
- Electorate: 106,543

Current constituency
- Created: 1991
- Party: CPN (Unified Socialist)
- MP: Prem Ale
- Sudurpashchim MPA 1(A): Bharat Bahadur Khadka (NC)
- Sudurpashchim MPA 1(B): Trilochan Bhatta (NCP)

Doti 1 is the parliamentary constituency of Doti District in Nepal. This constituency came into existence on the Constituency Delimitation Commission (CDC) report submitted on 31 August 2017.

== Incorporated areas ==
Doti 1 incorporates the entirety of Doti District.

== Assembly segments ==
It encompasses the following Sudurpashchim Provincial Assembly segment

- Doti 1(A)
- Doti 1(B)

== Members of Parliament ==
=== Parliament/Constituent Assembly ===
Election	Member	Party
1991	Bhakta Bahadur Balayar	Nepali Congress
2008	Harka Bahadur Singh	CPN (Unified Marxist–Leninist)
2013	Bir Bahadur Balayar	Nepali Congress
2017	Prem Ale	CPN (Unified Marxist–Leninist)
May 2018	Prem Ale	Nepal Communist Party
March 2021	Prem Ale	CPN (Unified Marxist–Leninist)
August 2021	Prem Ale	CPN (Unified Socialist)

=== Provincial Assembly ===
==== 1(A) ====
Election	Member	Party
2017	Bharat Bahadur Khadka	Nepali Congress

==== 1(B) ====
Election	Member	Party
2017	Trilochan Bhatta	CPN (Maoist Centre)
May 2018	Trilochan Bhatta	Nepal Communist Party

== Election results ==
=== Election in the 2020s ===
==== 2022 general election ====
Candidate	Party	Votes	%
Prem Bahadur Ale	CPN (Unified Socialist)	27,210	46.45
Gauri Kumari Oli	CPN (UML)	23,004	39.27
Narendra Bahadur Khadka	Independent	6,689	11.42
Others		1,680	2.87
Total		58,583	100.00
Majority		4,206	
CPN (Unified Socialist) hold			

=== Election in the 2010s ===
==== 2017 legislative elections ====
Party	Candidate	Votes
CPN (Unified Marxist–Leninist)	Prem Ale	32,510
Nepali Congress	Bir Bahadur Balayar	30,878
Others		1,698
Invalid votes		3,910
Result	CPN (UML) gain	
Source: Election Commission

==== 2017 Nepalese provincial elections ====
===== 1(A) =====
Party	Candidate	Votes
Nepali Congress	Bharat Bahadur Khadka	17,406
CPN (Unified Marxist-Leninist)	Chakra Bahadur Malla	16,792
Others		674
Invalid votes		1,961
Result	Congress gain	
Source: Election Commission

===== 1(B) =====
Party	Candidate	Votes
CPN (Maoist Centre)	Trilochan Bhatta	16,091
Nepali Congress	Yogendra Bahadur Shahi	13,495
Others		1,093
Invalid votes		1,773
Result	Maoist Centre gain	
Source: Election Commission

==== 2013 Constituent Assembly election ====
Party	Candidate	Votes
Nepali Congress	Bir Bahadur Balayar	16,957
CPN (Unified Marxist–Leninist)	Narad Malasi	8,247
UCPN (Maoist)	Mohand Bahadur Bam	4,796
Independent	Kailash Singh Saud	1,902
Others		1,595
Result	Congress gain	
Source: NepalNews

=== Election in the 2000s ===
==== 2008 Constituent Assembly election ====
Party	Candidate	Votes
CPN (Unified Marxist–Leninist)	Harka Bahadur Singh	14,506
Nepali Congress	Bir Bahadur Balayar	13,090
CPN (Maoist)	Trilochan Bhatta	8,503
Rastriya Prajatantra Party	Bahadur Singh Khadka	1,104
Others		1,007
Invalid votes		2,061
Result	CPN (UML) gain	
Source: Election Commission

=== Election in the 1990s ===
==== 1999 legislative elections ====
Party	Candidate	Votes
Nepali Congress	Bhakta Bahadur Balayar	14,198
CPN (Unified Marxist–Leninist)	Harka Bahadur Singh	12,290
CPN (Marxist–Leninist)	Kirti Chand Thakur	1,982
Others		1,701
Invalid votes		543
Result	Congress hold	
Source: Election Commission

==== 1994 legislative elections ====
Party	Candidate	Votes
Nepali Congress	Bhakta Bahadur Balayar	8,201
CPN (Unified Marxist–Leninist)	Purna Raj Joshi	6,132
Rastriya Prajatantra Party	Narayan Dutta Bhatta	4,787
Independent	Ram Chandra Bhatta	1,333
Others		1,422
Result	Congress hold	
Source: Election Commission

==== 1991 legislative elections ====
Party	Candidate	Votes
Nepali Congress	Bhakta Bahadur Balayar	19,805
Rastriya Prajatantra Party (Chand)		4,431
Result	Congress gain	

== See also ==
- List of parliamentary constituencies of Nepal
