= Ram Kumari Chaudhary =

Nepali politician

- राम कुमारी चौधरी

Member of Parliament, Pratinidhi Sabha for CPN (Maoist Centre) party list
- Incumbent
- Assumed office 4 March 2018

Personal details
- Born: 17 July 1985 (age 40)
- Party: CPN (Maoist Centre)

Ram Kumari Chaudhary is a Nepali politician and a member of the House of Representatives of the federal parliament of Nepal, as well as the State Minister for Agriculture, Land Management and Cooperatives in the federal government.

She had previously contested the Second Constituent Assembly election in 2013 as a UCPN (Maoist) candidate from Sunsari-2 constituency, but was defeated.
