= Dangraha =

Dangraha kamalpur डंग्राहा कमलपुर
- Village development committee
- Location in Nepal
- Coordinates: 26.59°N 87.33°E
- Nepal: Nepal
- Zone: Kosi Zone
- District: Morang District

Population (2009)
  - Total: 25,000
- Time zone: UTC+5:45 (Nepal Time)

Dangraha is a village development committee in Morang District in the Kosi Zone of south-eastern Nepal. At the time of the 1991 Nepal census it had a population of 3949 people living in 779 individual households.
