= Rishi Dhamala =

- ऋषि धमला
- Born: Rishiraj Dhamala; November 12, 1970 (age 55); Dhading District, Nepal
- Citizenship: Nepali
- Education: Proficiency Certificate Level (PCL) / Intermediate
- Occupations: Journalist, media entrepreneur, politician
- Years active: 1990s–present
- Employer(s): Prime Times Television, Reporters' Club Nepal
- Known for: Janata Janna Chahanchhan, Dhamala Ko Hamala
- Title: Founder and Chairperson of Prime Times Television; President of Reporters' Club Nepal
- Spouse: Aliza Gautam
- Children: 2

Rishi Dhamala (also known as Rishiraj Dhamala; Nepali: ऋषि धमला; born November 12, 1970) is a Nepali journalist, television broadcaster, media entrepreneur, and political figure. He is best known as the founder and chairperson of Prime Times Television and the long-standing president of the Reporters' Club Nepal. Over a career spanning more than three decades, Dhamala established himself as one of the most visible media personalities in Nepal, recognized for his aggressive, fast-paced interviewing style and close access to high-profile political figures.

In early 2026, Dhamala temporarily stepped away from active broadcasting to enter electoral politics, running as a parliamentary candidate for the House of Representatives.

== Early life ==
Dhamala was born on November 12, 1970, in the Dhading District of Nepal to parents Kul Prasad Dhamala and Chet Kumari Dhamala. He completed his primary and secondary schooling locally before moving to the capital city, Kathmandu, to pursue higher opportunities. He attained his Proficiency Certificate Level (PCL) / Intermediate level higher secondary education degree.

== Journalism career ==
Dhamala began his career in the print media industry in 1989, contributing to various local weekly newspapers in Kathmandu.

Dhamala gained nationwide attention through the establishment of the Reporters' Club Nepal, an independent journalists' association where he serves as the president and chief coordinator.

Dhamala is the founder and chairperson of Prime Times Television, a prominent satellite news channel in Nepal. On this network, he hosted his signature daily political talk show, Janata Janna Chahanchhan ("The Public Wants to Know"), alongside his entertainment-centric interview program, Dhamala Ko Hamala. His presentation format—frequently characterized by abrupt interruptions, a loud tone, and invasive personal inquiries—became a regular subject of both high viewership ratings and institutional criticism from media analysts.

== Transition into politics ==
Following decades of media-centric political engagement, Dhamala formally transitioned into active party politics. In January 2026, he secured an official party ticket from the Aam Janata Party, led by former minister Prabhu Sah, to contest the 2026 general election.

Dhamala filed his candidacy for the House of Representatives from the Rautahat-4 constituency, adopting the mobile phone as his electoral symbol. His election campaign drew extensive media coverage due to his retail-politics stunts, which included making traditional sweets at local stalls, cutting sugarcane alongside regional farmers, driving tractors, and hugging voters.

In the election held on March 5, 2026, Dhamala was defeated. Out of 73,398 total votes counted in the Rautahat-4 constituency, he secured 655 votes, finishing far behind the winning candidate, Ganesh Paudel of the Rastriya Swatantra Party. Following the official declaration, Dhamala stated that he accepted the election results as a technical step and a learning experience.

== Legal issues ==
On February 3, 2009, Dhamala was arrested by the Nepal Police over alleged operational links to an underground armed group called the Ranbir Sena. The allegations included involvement in extortion plots based on intercepted telephonic recordings. Dhamala maintained his complete innocence, and his legal representatives successfully argued that the intercepted phone conversations did not constitute admissible evidence of criminal ownership or orchestrating violent acts. He was subsequently released and cleared.

== Filmography ==
In addition to media entrepreneurship, Dhamala has made brief cameo appearances in the Nepali cinema industry, often playing self-parodying journalist caricatures. His film appearances include:

- How Funny (2016)
- Viral Gorkhey (2025)

== Personal life ==
Dhamala is married to Aliza Gautam, a Nepali media personality, film actress, and political activist who has also held ties with the Aam Janata Party. The couple has two children, a son and a daughter.
