= Shiva Kumar Mandal =

Nepalese Politician

- शिव कुमार मंडल

Member of Parliament, Pratinidhi Sabha
- Incumbent
- Assumed office 4 March 2018
- Preceded by: Amrit Kumar Aryal
- Constituency: Morang 5

Member of Constituent Assembly
- In office 21 January 2014 – 14 October 2017
- Preceded by: Ram Nanda Mandal
- Succeeded by: Aman Lal Modi
- Constituency: Morang 4

Personal details
- Born: 26 August 1975 (age 50)
- Party: Pragatisheel Loktantrik Party (2025-)
- Other political affiliations: CPN (Maoist Centre)

Shiva Kumar Mandal is a Nepalese politician and Minister of Supplies and serving as the Member Of House Of Representatives elected from Morang 5, Koshi Province. He is member of the Pragatisheel Loktantrik Party.

His private residence in Biratnagar was torched by protesters during the 2025 Nepalese Gen Z protests.
