= Prem Ale =

Nepali politician

Honourable Prem Bahadur Ale Magar
- प्रेम बहादुर आले मगर

Minister of Culture, Tourism and Civil Aviation
- In office 8 October 2021 – 26 June 2022
- President: Bidya Devi Bhandari
- Prime Minister: Sher Bahadur Deuba
- Preceded by: Lila Nath Shrestha
- Succeeded by: Jeevan Ram Shrestha

Minister of Forests and Environment
- In office 25 December 2020 – 4 June 2021
- President: Bidhya Devi Bhandari
- Prime Minister: K. P. Sharma Oli
- Preceded by: Shakti Bahadur
- Succeeded by: Narad Muni Rana

Member of Parliament, Pratinidhi Sabha
- In office 4 March 2018 – 12 September 2025
- Preceded by: Bir Bahadur Balayar
- Succeeded by: Bharat Bahadur Khadka (elect)
- Constituency: Doti 1

Member of Constituent Assembly
- In office 21 January 2014 – 14 October 2017
- Preceded by: Khem Bahadur Bam
- Succeeded by: Constituency abolished
- Constituency: Doti 2

Personal details
- Born: 28 April 1970 (age 55)
- Party: CPN (Unified Socialist)
- Other political affiliations: CPN (UML)

Prem Bahadur Ale Magar (born 28 April 1970) is a Nepali politician belonging to the CPN (Unified Socialist). He is also the former Minister of Culture, Tourism and Civil Aviation.

Before being Tourism Minister, Magar has previously served as the Minister for Forests and Environment of Nepal.

== Political life ==
He started his career as a local cadre first being elected as a ward member in Doti. After losing in the 2013 Constituent Assembly, he was elected, in the 2017 general election as a member of the House of Representatives from Doti 1 constituency.

In 2022, Ale gained widespread popularity after exposing the corruption behind land appropriation in the Narayanhiti Palace by Yogesh Bhattarai. He further accused Bhattarai of taking part in illegal gun smuggling after the end of the Civil War in 2008. He was praised by Prime Minister Sher Bahadur Deuba for his bold actions and he has vowed stern action against those accused in the fraud.

== Electoral history ==
=== 2017 legislative elections ===
Doti 1
Party	Candidate	Votes
CPN (Unified Marxist–Leninist)	Prem Ale	32,510
Nepali Congress	Bir Bahadur Balayar	30,878
Others		1,698
Invalid votes		3,910
Result	CPN (UML) gain	
Source: Election Commission

== Controversies ==
Amidst his catchy moves as a minister Ale recently got mired into controversy as a phone call recording between him and a Nepali national from Accham district leaked. He is heard abusing the person currently in Mumbai for his comments on social media. Ale's secretariat dismissed the recording as fabricated and manipulated to put down on Ale's image by an active conspiracy group.

== See also ==
- CPN (Unified Socialist)
