= Aam Janata Party =

General People's Party आम जनता पार्टी
- Chairperson: Prabhu Sah
- Founder: Prabhu Sah
- Founded: 29 December 2022 (3 years ago)
- Split from: CPN (UML)
- Headquarters: Kathmandu
- Student wing: Aam Bidyarthi Morcha
- Women's wing: Aam Mahila Morcha
- Peasant wing: Aam Kisan Morcha
- Ideology: Socialism
- Political position: Left-wing
- Slogan: विश्वभरका आम जनता एक होऔँ!
- Pratinidhi Sabha: 0 / 275
- Local governments: 1 / 753 Mayor/Chairperson

Election symbol

Website
- www.ajp.org.np

The Aam Janata Party (Nepali: आम जनता पार्टी, lit. 'General People's Party') is a Nepalese political party. The party has representation in federal parliament of Nepal since the 2022 general election.

Former minister Prabhu Sah serves as the chairman of the party.

== History ==
=== Formation ===
The party was formed on 29 December 2022 by former minister Prabhu Sah. Sah who had won as independent candidate formed the party after the 2022 Nepalese general election declaring that CPN (UML) was no longer in the way to solve the problems of general public.

Sah was supported by former minister Ram Bir Manandhar and Badri Neupane who were also from CPN (UML) background.

== Leadership ==
=== Chairman ===
- Prabhu Sah (2022–present)

== Sister organizations ==
- IT Army
- Aam Dalit Morcha
- Aam Mahila Morcha
- Aam Bidyarthi Morcha
- Aam Kisan Morcha
