= 1st Lumbini Provincial Assembly =

2017 provincial election in Nepal

2nd Assembly	→

Overview
- Legislative body: Lumbini Provincial Assembly
- Jurisdiction: Lumbini Province, Nepal
- Meeting place: Chamber of Commerce Meeting Hall, Bhalubang, Dang District
- Term: 4 February 2018 – September 2022
- Election: 2017 provincial elections
- Government: Shankar Pokharel cabinet Kul Prasad KC cabinet
- Website: pradeshsabha.p5.gov.np

Provincial Assembly
- Members: 87
- Speaker: Purna Bahadur Gharti (Maoist)
- Deputy Speaker: Krishni Tharu (UML)
- Chief Minister: Shankar Pokharel (UML); Kul Prasad KC (Maoist)
- Leader of the Opposition: Birendra Kumar Kanudiya (Congress); Shankar Pokharel (UML)

The first Lumbini Provincial Assembly was elected by the 2017 provincial elections. 87 members were elected to the assembly, 52 of whom were elected through direct elections and 35 of whom were elected through the party list proportional representation system. The term of the assembly started on 4 February 2018 and ended in September 2022. Shankar Pokharel from the CPN (UML) and Kul Prasad KC from the CPN (Maoist Centre) served as chief ministers during the term of the assembly. Purna Bahadur Gharti served as the speaker of the assembly and Krishni Tharu served as the deputy speaker.

== Composition ==
Party	Parliamentary party leader	Seats	
Party	Parliamentary party leader	After election	At dissolution
CPN (UML)	Shankar Pokharel	41	37
Nepali Congress	Birendra Kumar Kanudiya	12	19
CPN (Maoist Centre)	Kul Prasad KC	6	17
People's Socialist Party	Sahas Ram Yadav	—	4
CPN (Unified Socialist)	Rama Gharti Magar	—	1
Rastriya Janamorcha	Tara G.C.	1	1
Independent	—	—	1
Federal Socialist Forum	—	2	—
Rastriya Janata Party Nepal	—	1	—
Vacant			7
Total	—	87	87

== Members ==
Constituency/PR group	Member	Party
Dalit	Aasha Swarnakar	CPN (UML)
Nawalparasi West 1(B)	Ajay Shahi	Independent
Banke 1(B)	Arati Paudel	CPN (UML)
Kapilvastu 3(A)	Arjun Kumar KC	CPN (UML)
Indigenous peoples	Arjun Kumar Shrestha	Nepali Congress
Rupandehi 4(A)	Ashtha Bhuja Pathak	Nepali Congress
Banke 3(B)	Babu Ram Gautam	CPN (UML)
Nawalparasi West 2(A)	Baijanath Chaudhary (Tharu)	CPN (UML)
Nawalparasi West 2(B)	Baij Nath Kalwar	Nepali Congress
Khas Arya	Bhagawati Devi Bhandari	CPN (UML)
Rupandehi 2(B)	Bhoj Prasad Shrestha	CPN (UML)
Tharu	Bhubaneshwor Chaudhary	Nepali Congress
Rupandehi 5(A)	Bhumishwor Dhakal	CPN (UML)
Khas Arya	Bimala Sharma Panthi	CPN (UML)
Dang 3(B)	Bimala Kumari Khatri	CPN (UML)
Indigenous peoples	Bir Bahadur Rana	Nepali Congress
Kapilvastu 3(B)	Birendra Kumar Kanudiya	Nepali Congress
Kapilvastu 1(A)	Bishnu Prasad Panthi	CPN (UML)
Arghakhanchi 1(A)	Chet Narayan Acharya	CPN (UML)
Madheshi	Chintawati Kurmi	CPN (UML)
Khas Arya	Dama Kumari Sharma	CPN (Maoist Centre)
Tharu	Dhamkali Chaudhary	CPN (UML)
Kapilvastu 2(B)	Dharma Bahadur Lal Shriwastav	CPN (UML)
Dang 3(A)	Dilli Bahadur Chaudhary	Nepali Congress
Dalit	Dipa B.K.	CPN (Maoist Centre)
Nawalparasi West 1(A)	Dipendra Kumar Adhikari	CPN (UML)
Rolpa 1(B)	Dipendra Kumar Pun Magar	CPN (Maoist Centre)
Rupandehi 5(B)	Fakharuddin Khan	Nepali Congress
Muslim	Faujiya Nasim	CPN (UML)
Khas Arya	Gita Thapa	CPN (Maoist Centre)
Pyuthan 1(A)	Hari Prashad Rijal	CPN (UML)
Banke 3(A)	Indra Prasad Kharel	CPN (Maoist Centre)
Dang 1(A)	Indrajit Tharu	CPN (Maoist Centre)
Khas Arya	Jalpa Bhusal	CPN (UML)
Bardiya 1(A)	Kabi Ram Tharu	CPN (UML)
Gulmi 1(B)	Kamal Raj Shrestha	CPN (UML)
Dalit	Kamala Devi B.K.	CPN (UML)
Gulmi 2(A)	Khadga Bahadur Khatri	CPN (UML)
Pyuthan 1(B)	Krishna Dhoj Khadka	CPN (Maoist Centre)
Banke 1(A)	Krishna KC	CPN (Maoist Centre)
Rupandehi 1(A)	Krishna Prasad Neupane	CPN (UML)
Tharu	Krishni Tharu	CPN (UML)
Rolpa 1(A)	Kul Prasad KC	CPN (Maoist Centre)
Bardiya 2(A)	Kul Prasad Pokharel	CPN (UML)
Tharu	Lauti Tharu	CPN (Maoist Centre)
Rupandehi 2(A)	Lila Giri	CPN (UML)
Dalit	Mala Gotame	Nepali Congress
Muslim	Mohammad Yakub Ansari	Nepali Congress
Palpa 1(B)	Narayan Prasad Acharya	CPN (UML)
Khas Arya	Nirmala Kshetri	Nepali Congress
Madheshi	Nirmala Mudbhari Bhattarai	People's Socialist Party
Indigenous peoples	Parbati Pun Gahatraj	CPN (Maoist Centre)
Palpa 2(A)	Puran Man Bajracharya	CPN (UML)
Indigenous peoples	Purmati Dhenga	People's Socialist Party
Eastern Rukum 1(B)	Purna Bahadur Gharti Magar	CPN (Maoist Centre)
Tharu	Pushpa Tharuni	Nepali Congress
Khas Arya	Rama Aryal	Nepali Congress
Indigenous peoples	Rama Gharti	CPN (Unified Socialist)
Arghakhanchi 1(B)	Ramji Prasad Ghimire	CPN (UML)
Dang 1(B)	Rewati Raman Sharma	CPN (UML)
Dalit	Rina Nepal	Nepali Congress
Madheshi	Rundhawati Sharma	Nepali Congress
Kapilvastu 1(B)	Sahas Ram Yadav	People's Socialist Party
Khas Arya	Saraswati Gautam	CPN (UML)
Khas Arya	Shankar Giri	Nepali Congress
Dang 2(A)	Shankar Pokharel	CPN (UML)
Madheshi, Sonar	Shanti Devi Swarnakar	Nepali Congress
Gulmi 1(A)	Sudarshan Baral	CPN (Maoist Centre)
Khas Arya	Suman Sharma Rayamajhi	People's Socialist Party
Madheshi	Sunita Kumari Thather	CPN (UML)
Banke 2(B)	Surendra Bahadur Hamal	Nepali Congress
Madheshi	Sushma Yadav	CPN (Maoist Centre)
Khas Arya	Tara G.C.	Rastriya Janamorcha
Eastern Rukum 1(A)	Tej Bahadur Oli	CPN (Maoist Centre)
Indigenous peoples	Than Kumari Thapa	CPN (UML)
Bardiya 1(B)	Tilak Ram Sharma	CPN (Maoist Centre)
Palpa 2(B)	Tula Ram Gharti Magar	CPN (Maoist Centre)
Rupandehi 3(B)	Tulshi Prasad Chaudhary	CPN (UML)
Rupandehi 4(B)	Wasiuddin Khan	Nepali Congress
Palpa 1(A)	Yuvaraj Khanal	CPN (UML)

=== Changes ===
Constituency/PR group	MPA	Party	Date seat vacated	Cause of vacation	New MPA	Party
Madheshi	Bina Panta	Rastriya Janata Party Nepal	6 June 2018	Resignation	Kalpana Pandey	Rastriya Janata Party Nepal
Dang 3(B)	Uttar Kumar Oli	Nepal Communist Party	22 February 2019	Death	Bimala Kumari Khatri	Nepal Communist Party
Khas Arya	Baldev Sharma Pokharel	Nepali Congress	20 January 2020	Death	Shankar Giri	Nepali Congress
Rupandehi 1(B)	Dadhiram Neupane	CPN (Maoist Centre)	6 April 2021	Expelled by party		
Gulmi 2(B)	Dinesh Panthi	CPN (Maoist Centre)	6 April 2021	Expelled by party		
Kapilvastu 1(A)	Dirgha Narayan Pandey	CPN (UML)	2 May 2021	Resignation		
Dang 2(B)	Amar Bahadur Dangi Chhetri	CPN (UML)	5 May 2021	Resignation		
Rupandehi 3(A)	Santosh Kumar Pandeya	People's Socialist Party	29 April 2021	Expelled by party		
Banke 2(A)	Bijay Bahadur Yadav	People's Socialist Party	29 April 2021	Expelled by party		
Madheshi	Kalpana Pandey	People's Socialist Party	29 April 2021	Expelled by party	Nirmala Mudbhari Bhattarai	People's Socialist Party
Bardiya 2(B)	Dipesh Tharu	CPN (Maoist Centre)	24 April 2022	Resignation to contest as mayor of Rajapur		

=== Defections ===
Constituency/PR group	MPA	Previous Party	Date defected	New Party
Indigenous peoples	Rama Gharti	CPN (UML)	1 September 2021	CPN (Unified Socialist)

== See also ==
- Lumbini Province
- 2017 Nepalese provincial elections
