= Chet Narayan Acharya =

Nepalese politician

Honourable Chet Narayan Acharya
- चेत नारायण आचार्य

Chief Minister of Lumbini Province
- Incumbent
- Assumed office 24 July 2024
- President: Ram Chandra Poudel
- Governor: Amik Sherchan; Krishna Bahadur Gharti
- Preceded by: Jokh Bahadur Mahara
Ministerial positions
Minister for Economic Affairs and Planning of Lumbini Province
In office 5 April 2024 – 4 July 2024
Governor	Amik Sherchan
Chief Minister	Jokh Bahadur Mahara
Preceded by	Dhan Bahadur Maskey
Succeeded by	Dhanendra Karki
Minister for Physical Infrastructure Development of Lumbini Province
In office 26 March 2023 – 27 April 2023
Governor	Amik Sherchan
Chief Minister	Leela Giri
Preceded by	Indrajit Tharu
Succeeded by	Dharma Bahadur Chaudhary
Minister for Water Supply, Rural and Urban Development of Lumbini Province
In office 12 January 2023 – 27 April 2023
Governor	Amik Sherchan
Chief Minister	Leela Giri
Preceded by	Dilli Bahadur Chaudhary
Succeeded by	Krishna KC
Minister for Internal Affairs and Law of Lumbini Province
In office 4 May 2021 – 11 August 2021
Governor	Dharmanath Yadav; Amik Sherchan
Chief Minister	Shankar Pokharel
Preceded by	Leela Giri
Succeeded by	Tilak Ram Sharma
Other senior positions
Parliamentary Party Leader of CPN (UML) in Lumbini Provincial Assembly
Incumbent
Assumed office 17 August 2024
Deputy	Bhoj Prasad Shrestha
Preceded by	Leela Giri
Parliamentary Party Deputy Leader of CPN (UML) in Lumbini Provincial Assembly
In office 2 January 2023 – 17 August 2024
Leader	Leela Giri
Succeeded by	Bhoj Prasad Shrestha

Member of the Lumbini Provincial Assembly
- Incumbent
- Assumed office 21 January 2018
- Constituency: Arghakhanchi 1 (A)

Personal details
- Born: 4 June 1968 (age 57) Argha, Sandhikharka, Arghakhanchi District
- Party: Communist Party of Nepal (Unified Marxist-Leninist)
- Other political affiliations: Nepal Communist Party
- Spouse: Dipa Acharya
- Children: 2
- Parents: Late Tikaram Acharya (father); Taradevi Acharya (mother)

Chet Narayan Acharya (Nepali: चेत नारायण आचार्य; born 31 May 1968, Argha, located in the present-day Sandhikharka municipality of Arghakhanchi district) is a Nepalese politician who has been serving as the Chief Minister of Lumbini Province since 24 July 2024. Acharya is a member of the Communist Party of Nepal (Unified Marxist–Leninist) and serves on its central committee.

Acharya has been serving as a member of the Lumbini Provincial Assembly from Arghakhanchi 1 (A) constituency since January 2018, was elected as the Parliamentary Party Leader of the CPN (Unified Marxist-Leninist) in the Provincial Assembly in August 2025, causing dissatisfaction for former chief minister Giri, who resigned as the Parliamentary Party Leader on July 7, the same day he was appointed a chief minister.

== Early life and education ==
Chet Narayan Acharya was born as the second son to his father, the late Tikaram Acharya, and his mother, Taradevi Acharya, on 4 June 1968, in Argha, located in the present-day Sandhikharka municipality of Arghakhanchi district. He was greatly influenced by his father, Tikaram Acharya, who was the founder of the Communist Party in Arghakhanchi District. Thus, he got involved in politics through the influence of his father and family. Acharya joined ANNFSU (All Nepal National Free Students Union) at the age of 11. In 1983, he was elected as a member of the ANNFSU District Committee in Arghakhanchi. In 1986, he went to Butwal for higher education and became the president of ANNFSU Butwal Multiple Campus and a district committee member. Acharya holds a bachelor's degree in law.

== Political career ==
Acharya's political career began in 1983 when he was elected as a member of the ANNFSU District Committee in Arghakhanchi. In 1986, he pursued higher education in Butwal, where he became the president of ANNFSU Butwal Multiple Campus and a district committee member. Upon returning to Arghakhanchi, he served in various roles, including area committee member, deputy secretary, district committee member, and district committee secretariat member for seven years starting from 1989.

Acharya was elected as the secretary in the party's third district convention in 1997. After being re-elected as the secretary in the fourth and fifth district conventions, he worked as the party's chairman for 11 years continuously. He ran in the first Constituent Assembly in 2008 from the Arghakhanchi 1 constituency but was defeated by the CPN (Maoist) candidate Top Bahadur Rayamajhi, finishing in third place. Acharya served as a member of the Lumbini Zone Committee, where he continued his party work, from 2009 to 2013. He was elected as the chairman in the seventh district convention in 2012 and worked as the party's district chairman for nine years.

In the 2017 Nepalese provincial election, he won the election from the Arghakhanchi 1 (A) constituency and took charge as the Minister for Internal Affairs and Law in Shankar Pokharel's cabinet. He was elected as a central member in the party's 10th general convention in 2021 and served as the co-in-charge of Arghakhanchi. In the 2022 Nepalese provincial election, he once again won the election from the Arghakhanchi 1 (A) constituency and was elected as the parliamentary party deputy leader of the CPN (UML) in the Lumbini Provincial Assembly. He served as the Minister for Water Supply, Rural and Urban Development, and the Minister for Physical Infrastructure Development in Leela Giri's cabinet, and as the Minister for Economic Affairs and Planning in Jokh Bahadur Mahara's cabinet.

== Personal life ==
Acharya is married to Dipa Acharya, who is active in politics as the chairwoman of the All Nepal Women's Association Arghakhanchi District Committee and a member of the party district committee. They have one son and one daughter.

== Electoral history ==
=== 2022 provincial elections ===
==== Arghakhanchi 1 (A) ====
Candidate	Party	Votes	%
Chet Narayan Acharya	CPN (UML)	20,525	49.20
Sagar K.C. (Chhetri)	Rastriya Janamorcha	19,790	47.44
Others		1,402	3.36
Total		41,717	100.00
Majority		735	
CPN (UML) gain			

=== 2017 provincial elections ===
==== Arghakhanchi 1 (A) ====
Candidate	Party	Votes	%
Chet Narayan Acharya	CPN (UML)	24,751	61.32
Bishnu Prasad Khanal	Nepali Congress	14,137	35.02
Others		1,476	3.66
Total		40,364	100.00
Valid votes		40,364	96.52
Invalid/blank votes		1,455	3.48
Total votes		41,819	100.00
Majority		10,614	
CPN (UML) gain			
Source: Election Commission

=== 2008 Constituent Assembly election ===
==== Arghakhanchi 1 ====
Candidate	Party	Votes	%
Top Bahadur Rayamajhi	CPN (Maoist)	19,584	41.48
Man Bahadur Bishwakarma	Nepali Congress	10,591	22.43
Chet Narayan Acharya	CPN (UML)	9,461	20.04
Dilaram Acharya	Rastriya Janamorcha	7,575	16.04
Others		0	0.00
Total		47,211	100.00
Valid votes		47,211	96.17
Invalid/blank votes		1,879	3.83
Total votes		49,090	100.00
Majority		8,993	
CPN (Maoist) gain			
Source: Election Commission

Political offices
Preceded by Jokh Bahadur Mahara	Chief Minister of Lumbini Province; 2024 – present	Incumbent
