= Purna Bahadur Gharti Magar =

Nepali politician

- पूर्ण बहादुर घर्ती मगर

1st Speaker of the Lumbini Provincial Assembly
- In office 14 February 2018 – 18 September 2022
- Governor: Uma Kant Jha; Dharmanath Yadav; Amik Sherchan
- Chief Minister: Shankar Pokharel; Kul Prasad KC
- Deputy: Krishni Tharu
- Preceded by: Constituency created
- Succeeded by: Tularam Gharti Magar

Member of Parliament, Pratinidhi Sabha
- Incumbent
- Assumed office 24 December 2022
- Preceded by: Kamala Roka
- Constituency: Eastern Rukum 1

Member of the Lumbini Provincial Assembly
- In office 5 February 2018 – 18 September 2022
- Preceded by: Constituency created
- Succeeded by: Dhan Bahadur K.C.
- Constituency: Eastern Rukum 1(B)

Personal details
- Born: 13 August 1967 (age 58) Rukum District
- Party: CPN (Maoist Centre)

Purna Bahadur Gharti Magar is a Nepalese politician, belonging to the Communist Party of Nepal (Maoist Centre) currently serving as a member of the 2nd Federal Parliament of Nepal. In the 2022 Nepalese general election, he won the election from the Eastern Rukum 1 (constituency).
