= Shankar Pokharel cabinet =

Members of Shankar Pokharel's Cabinet

First Shankar Pokharel cabinet
- 1st Cabinet of Lumbini Province
- Date formed: 15 February 2018
- Date dissolved: 2 May 2021

People and organisations
- Governor: Uma Kant Jha; Dharmanath Yadav
- Chief Minister: Shankar Pokharel
- Member parties: Nepal Communist Party
- Status in legislature: Minority government
- Opposition party: Nepali Congress
- Opposition leader: Birendra Kumar Kanodia

History
- Election: 2017
- Legislature term: 5 years
- Predecessor: Province established
- Successor: Second Shankar Pokharel cabinet

Shankar Pokharel was sworn in as Chief Minister of Lumbini Province on 14 February 2018. Here is the list of ministers. This government has been at to fall till 11 August 2021 as ruling party of federal level, Nepali Congress and third largest party in assembly, CPN(Maoist centre) collision has reached majority with a common understanding. Shankar Pokharel resigned on 11 August 2021.

== Cabinet ministers ==
S.N.	Portfolio	Name Constituency	Political Party	Took office	Left office
Cabinet ministers
1	Chief Minister; All other ministries not allocated to anyone.	Shankar Pokharel; MPA for Dang 2 (A)	CPN (UML)	15 February 2018	2 May 2021
3	Minister for Economic Affairs and Planning	Baijanath Chaudhary; MPA for Nawalparasi West 2(A)	CPN (UML)	19 April 2021	2 May 2021
3	Minister for Rural and Urban Development	Baijanath Chaudhary; MPA for Nawalparasi West 2(A)	CPN (UML)	19 April 2021	2 May 2021
3	Minister for Internal Affairs and Law	Lila Giri; MPA for Rupandehi 2(A)	CPN (UML)	19 April 2021	2 May 2021
3	Minister for Health and Population	Lila Giri; MPA for Rupandehi 2(A)	CPN (UML)	19 April 2021	2 May 2021
4	Minister for Physical Infrastructure Development	Santosh Kumar Pandeya; MPA for Rupandehi 3(A)	PSP-N	19 April 2021	2 May 2021
5	Minister for Industry, Forests and Environment	Arati Paudel; MPA for Banke 1(B)	CPN (UML)	19 April 2021	2 May 2021
6	Minister for Land Management, Agriculture and Cooperatives	Bijay Bahadur Yadav; MPA for Banke 2(A)	PSP-N	19 April 2021	2 May 2021
7	Minister for Education and Social Development	Kalpana Pandey; List MPA	PSP-N	19 April 2021	2 May 2021
State ministers
8	Minister for Physical Infrastructure Development	Sumana Sharma Rayamajihi; List MPA	PSP-N	19 April 2021	2 May 2021

=== Until April 2021 ===
S.N.	Portfolio	Name Constituency	Political Party	Took office	Left office
Cabinet ministers
1	Chief Minister; All other ministries not allocated to anyone.	Shankar Pokharel; MPA for Dang 2 (A)	CPN (UML)	15 February 2018	2 May 2021
2	Minister for Internal Affairs and Law	Kul Prasad KC; MPA for Rolpa 1 (A)	CPN (MC)	15 February 2018	19 April 2021
3	Minister for Physical Infrastructure Development	Baijanath Chaudhary; MPA for Nawalparasi West 2(A)	CPN (UML)	15 February 2018	19 April 2021
4	Minister for Industry, Tourism, Forest and Environment	Lila Giri; MPA for Rupandehi 2(A)	CPN (UML)	20 March 2018	19 April 2021
5	Minister for Social Development	Sudarshan Baral; MPA for Gulmi 1(A)	CPN (MC)	20 March 2018	19 April 2021
7	Minister for Land Management, Agriculture and Cooperatives	Arati Paudel; MPA for Banke 1(B)	CPN (UML)	20 March 2018	19 April 2021

== Second cabinet ==
Second Shankar Pokharel cabinet
- 2nd Cabinet of Lumbini Province
- Date formed: 2 May 2021
- Date dissolved: 11 August 2021

People and organisations
- Governor: Dharmanath Yadav; Amik Sherchan
- Chief Minister: Shankar Pokharel
- Status in legislature: Minority government
- Opposition party: Nepali Congress
- Opposition leader: Birendra Kumar Kanodia

History
- Election: 2017
- Legislature term: 5 years
- Predecessor: First Shankar Pokharel cabinet
- Successor: Kul Prasad KC cabinet

The Second Shankar Pokharel cabinet was the 2nd provincial government of Lumbini Province. It was formed after Shankar Pokharel was sworn in as Chief Minister of Lumbini Province on 2 May 2021.

S.N.	Portfolio	Name Constituency	Political Party	Took office	Left office
Cabinet ministers
1	Chief Minister; All other ministries not allocated to anyone.	Shankar Pokharel	CPN(UML)	2 May 2021	11 August 2021
2	Minister for Economic Affairs and Planning	Baijanath Chaudhary	CPN(UML)	2 May 2021	11 August 2021
3	Minister for Rural and Urban Development	Hari Prasad Rijal	CPN(UML)	4 May 2021	11 August 2021
4	Minister for Internal Affairs and Law	Chetnath Acharya	CPN(UML)	4 May 2021	11 August 2021
5	Minister for Health and Population	Bhoj Prasad Shrestha	CPN(UML)	4 May 2021	11 August 2021
6	Minister for Physical Infrastructure Development	Santosh Kumar Pandeya	PSP-N	2 May 2021	10 August 2021
7	Minister for Land Management, Agriculture and Cooperatives	Bijay Bahadur Yadav	PSP-N	2 May 2021	11 August 2021
8	Minister for Education and Social Development	Dharma Bahadur Lal Shrivastava	PPP	4 May 2021	11 August 2021
9	Minister for Industry, Forest and Environment	Kalpana Pandeya	PSP-N	4 May 2021	11 August 2021
State ministers
10	Minister of state for Physical Infrastructure Development	Suman Sharma Rayamajhi	PSP-N	2 May 2021	2 July 2021

=== Until 4 May 2021 ===
S.N.	Portfolio	Name Constituency	Political Party	Took office	Left office
Cabinet ministers
1	Chief Minister; All other ministries not allocated to anyone.	Shankar Pokharel	CPN(UML)	2 May 2021	11 August 2021
2	Minister for Economic Affairs and Planning	Baijanath Chaudhary	CPN(UML)	2 May 2021	11 August 2021
3	Minister for Health and Population	Hari Prasad Rijal	CPN(UML)	2 May 2021	4 May 2021
4	Minister for Physical Infrastructure Development	Santosh Kumar Pandeya	PSP-N	2 May 2021	11 August 2021
5	Minister for Land Management, Agriculture and Cooperatives	Bijay Bahadur Yadav	PSP-N	2 May 2021	11 August 2021
6	Minister for Education and Social Development	Kalpana Pandeya	PSP-N	2 May 2021	4 May 2021
State ministers
7	Minister of state for Physical Infrastructure Development	Suman Sharma Rayamajhi	PSP-N	2 May 2021	2 July 2021

== Dispute with opposition ==
Kul Prasad KC was proposed as the second Chief-minister of Lumbini Province after Shankar Pokhrel had resigned from the post by the support of NC, PSP-N and Rastriya Janamorcha as a part of National level opposition alliance with majority signatures. Still the proposal was unanimously disapproved by Governor of the province and showed an unlawful manner by appointing Pokharel in minority using CPN(UML) letter pad. Pokharel took oath by calling governor to his official residence than going to governor's which was against the practice till date. On 5 July 2021, one sitting state minister from Shankar Pokharel cabinet resigned to bring back majority in opposition side led my main opposition party Nepali Congress. KC has previously worked as Minister for Internal Affairs and Law in Shankar Pokharel Cabinet while resigned on 6 Baishakh 2078 when he was already proposed as the next Chief minister.

On 15 July 2021, Pokharel and other sitting ministers left the house meeting when they had no chance of getting the budget bill passed. This was claimed a very un-democratic by opposition and they again claimed Pokharel should give a resignation than disturbing the assembly with minority. They are demanding the incumbent Chief-minister to take vote of confidence to check if he's in majority else resign from post.
