= Kul Prasad KC cabinet =

Cabinet of Lumbini provincial government

- 2nd Cabinet of Lumbini Province
- Date formed: 12 August 2021

People and organisations
- Head of state: Amik Sherchan
- Head of government: Kul Prasad KC
- Member parties: Major parties: Nepali Congress; CPN (Maoist Centre); Minor party: People's Socialist Party, Nepal; CPN (Unified Socialist)
- Status in legislature: collision government
- Opposition party: CPN(UML)
- Opposition leader: Shankar Pokharel

History
- Incoming formation: Birendra Kumar Kanodia cabinet
- Election: 2017
- Legislature term: 5 years
- Predecessor: Shankar Pokharel cabinet

Kul Prasad KC was sworn in as Chief Minister of Lumbini Province on 12 August 2021. He became second chief minister of the province following the resignation of Shankar Pokharel, who stepped down after losing his majority.

Nepali Congress, the second largest party in assembly, played vital role in the formation of the government. As part of a power-sharing agreement, the CPN(Maoist Centre) is expected to hand over the leadership of the government to Nepali Congress in few months.

Here is a full list of cabinet ministers.

== Chief minister and cabinet ministers ==
S.N.	Holder	Portfolio	Constituency	Took office	Party
Cabinet ministers
1	Kul Prasad KC	Chief Minister	Rolpa 1(A)	12 August 2021	CPN(Maoist Centre)
2	Dilli Bahadur Chaudhary	Minister for Tourism, Rural and Urban Development	Dang 3(A)	12 August 2021	Nepali Congress
3	Krishna Dhoj Khadka	Minister for Economic Affairs and Cooperatives	Pyuthan 1(B)	12 August 2021	CPN(Maoist Centre)
4	Wasiuddin Khan	Minister for Education, Science and Sports	Rupandehi 4(B)	10 October 2021	Nepali Congress
5	Ajay Shahi	Minister for Industry, Commerce and Supplies	Nawalparasi West 1(B)	12 August 2021	People's Progressive Party
6	Bir Bahadur Rana	Minister for Energy, Water Resource and Irrigation		10 October 2021	Nepali Congress
7	Sahas Ram Yadav	Minister for Physical Infrastructure Development	Kapilbastu 1(B)	12 August 2021	Nepali Congress
8	Surendra Bahadur Hamal	Minister for Forest, Environment and Soil Conservation	Banke 2(B)	10 October 2021	Nepali Congress
9	Rama Gharti	Minister for Law, Women Children and Elder Citizens		10 October 2021	CPN (Unified Socialist)
10	Tilakram Sharma	Minister for Internal Affairs and Communication	Bardiya 1(B)	10 October 2021	CPN (Maoist Centre)
11	Indrajit Tharu	Minister for Health, Population and Family Welfare	Dang 1(A)	10 October 2021	CPN (Maoist Centre)
12	Suman Sharma Rayamajhi	Minister for Agriculture, Food Technology and Land Management		12 August 2021	Nepali Congress
13	Purmati Dhenga	Minister for Labour, Employment and Transportation Management		12 August 2021	Nepali Congress
14	Rina Nepal BK	Minister of state		10 October 2021	Nepali Congress
15	Arjun Kumar Shrestha	Minister of state		10 October 2021	Nepali Congress
16	Bimala Khatri Oli	Minister of state	Dang 3(B)	10 October 2021	CPN (Maoist Centre)

== Member by party ==
Representation of cabinet ministers by party
1. Nepali Congress (59.0%)
2. CPN (Maoist Centre) (35.0%)
3. 0.00%
4. CPN (Unified Socialist) (6.00%)

Party	Cabinet Ministers	Ministers of State	Total Ministers
Nepali Congress	8	2	10
CPN (Maoist Centre)	4	2	6
CPN (Unified Socialist)	1	0	1

== See also ==
- Rajendra Kumar Rai cabinet
- Lalbabu Raut cabinet
- Rajendra Prasad Pandey cabinet
- Krishna Chandra Nepali cabinet
- Jeevan Bahadur Shahi cabinet
- Trilochan Bhatta cabinet
