= Chief Minister of Lumbini Province =

Head of Lumbini Province government

- लुम्बिनी प्रदेशका मुख्यमन्त्री
- Incumbent; Chet Narayan Acharya since 22 July 2024
- Government of Lumbini Province
- Style: Honorable; Mr. Chief Minister
- Status: Head of Government
- Abbreviation: CMO
- Member of: Provincial Assembly; Cabinet
- Appointer: Governor
- Term length: Until majority confidence retained in provincial assembly Assembly term is 5 years unless dissolved earlier; No term limits
- Formation: 2018 (8 years ago)
- First holder: Shankar Pokharel
- Salary: रु. - 61,000
- Website: Official website

The Chief Minister of the Lumbini Province is the head of government of Lumbini Province. The chief minister is appointed by the governor of the province according to Article 167 of the Constitution of Nepal. The chief minister remains in office for five years or until the provincial assembly is dissolved, and is subject to no term limits, given that they have the confidence of the assembly.

The current chief minister is CPN (UML)'s Chet Narayan Acharya, in office since 22 July 2024.

== Qualification ==
The Constitution of Nepal sets the qualifications required to become eligible for the office of chief minister. A chief minister must meet the qualifications to become a member of the provincial assembly.

A member of the provincial assembly must be:

- a citizen of Nepal
- a voter of the concerned province
- of 25 years of age or more
- not convicted of any criminal offense
- not disqualified by any law
- not holding any office of profit

In addition to this, the chief minister must be the parliamentary party leader of the party with the majority seats in the provincial assembly. If no party has a majority, the chief minister must have a majority in the assembly with the support from other parties. If within thirty days of the election, a chief minister is not appointed as such, or fails to obtain a vote of confidence from the assembly, the parliamentary party leader of the party with the most seats in the assembly is appointed chief minister. If the chief minister such appointed fails to obtain a vote of confidence in the assembly, any assembly member who can command a majority in the floor, irrespective of party allegiance, is appointed chief minister. If this chief minister also fails to obtain a vote of confidence, the governor dissolves the assembly and fresh elections are called.

== List of chief ministers of Lumbini province ==
No.	Portrait	Name Constituency (lifespan)	Term of office			Assembly (election)	Political party	Cabinet	Ref.
No.	Portrait	Name Constituency (lifespan)	Assumed office	Left office	Time in office	Assembly (election)	Political party	Cabinet	Ref.
1		Shankar Pokharel; MPA for Dang 2 (A) (born 1963)	15 February 2018	2 May 2021	3 years, 76 days	1st (2017)	CPN (UML)	Pokharel	
1		Shankar Pokharel; MPA for Dang 2 (A) (born 1963)	2 May 2021	11 August 2021	101 days	1st (2017)	CPN (UML)	Pokharel	
2		Kul Prasad KC; MPA for Rolpa 1 (A) (born 1971)	11 August 2021	12 January 2023	1 year, 154 days	1st (2017)	CPN (Maoist Centre)	KC	
3		Leela Giri; MPA for Rupandehi 2 (A) (born 1955)	12 January 2023	27 April 2023	105 days	2nd (2022)	CPN (UML)	Giri	
4		Dilli Bahadur Chaudhary; MPA for Dang 3 (A) (born 1969)	27 April 2023	4 April 2024	343 days	2nd (2022)	Nepali Congress	Chaudhary	
5		Jokh Bahadur Mahara; MPA for Rolpa 1 (A) (born 1963)	5 April 2024	22 July 2024	108 days	2nd (2022)	CPN (Maoist Centre)	Mahara	
6		Chet Narayan Acharya; MPA for Archakhanchi 1 (A) (born 1968)	22 July 2024	Incumbent	2 years, 101 days	2nd (2022)	CPN (UML)	Acharya	
