= Tularam Gharti Magar =

Nepalese politician

Honourable Tularam Gharti Magar
- तुलाराम घर्ति मगर

Speaker of the Lumbini Provincial Assembly
- Incumbent
- Assumed office 18 January 2023
- Governor: Amik Sherchan
- Chief Minister: Chet Narayan Acharya
- Deputy: Menuka Khand K.C.
- Preceded by: Purna Bahadur Gharti Magar

Member of the Lumbini Provincial Assembly
- Incumbent
- Assumed office 2018
- Constituency: Palpa 2(B)

Personal details
- Born: 30 July 1968 (age 57) Rolpa Municipality, Lumbini Province, Nepal
- Party: Communist Party of Nepal (Maoist Centre)
- Other political affiliations: Nepal Communist Party

Tularam Gharti Magar (Nepali: तुलाराम घर्ति मगर) is a Nepalese politician and currently serving as the Speaker of the Lumbini Provincial Assembly since 18 January 2023. He has been serving as a member of the Lumbini Provincial Assembly from Palpa 2 (B) constituency since 2018.

== Electoral history ==
=== 2022 provincial elections ===
==== Palpa 2(B) ====
Candidate	Party	Votes	%
Tularam Gharti Magar	CPN (Maoist Centre)	13,992	48.83
Om Bahadur Gharti Magar	CPN (UML)	13,051	45.54
Others		1,613	5.63
Total		28,656	100.00
Majority		941	
CPN (Maoist Centre)			

=== 2017 provincial elections ===
==== Palpa 2(B) ====
Candidate	Party	Votes	%
Tularam Gharti Magar	CPN (Maoist Centre)	16,422	56.61
Ram Bahadur Karki	Nepali Congress	11,496	39.63
Others		1,093	3.77
Total		29,011	100.00
Valid votes		29,011	97.59
Invalid/blank votes		717	2.41
Total votes		29,728	100.00
Majority		4,926	
CPN (Maoist Centre)			
