= Kapilvastu 2 =

Parliamentary constituency in Nepal

- Parliamentary constituency
- Kapilvastu 2 in Lumbini Province
- Province: Lumbini Province
- District: Kapilvastu District

Current constituency
- Created: 1991
- Party: Rastriya Swatantra Party
- Member of Parliament: Bikram Thapa

Kapilvastu 2 one of three parliamentary constituencies of Kapilvastu District in Nepal. This constituency came into existence on the Constituency Delimitation Commission (CDC) report submitted on 31 August 2017.

== Incorporated areas ==
Kapilvastu 2 incorporates Budhhabhumi Municipality, Yashodhara Rural Municipality, wards 1–4 and 8–11 of Maharajgunj Municipality, and wards 1–7 of Kapilvastu Municipality.

== Assembly segments ==
It encompasses the following Lumbini Provincial Assembly segment

- Kapilvastu 2(A)
- Kapilvastu 2(B)

== Members of Parliament ==
=== Parliament/Constituent Assembly ===
Election	Member	Party
1991	Deep Kumar Upadhyaya	Nepali Congress
1994	Dipak Kumar Upadhyaya	Nepali Congress
1999	Brijesh Kumar Gupta	Rastriya Prajatantra Party
2008	Dan Bahadur Kurmi	Terai Madhesh Loktantrik Party
December 2010	Dan Bahadur Kurmi	Terai Madhesh Loktantrik Party Nepal
2013	Atahar Kamal Musalman	Independent
April 2016	Atahar Kamal Musalman	Nepali Congress
2017	Brijesh Kumar Gupta	CPN (Unified Marxist–Leninist)
May 2018	Brijesh Kumar Gupta	Nepal Communist Party
March 2021	Brijesh Kumar Gupta	CPN (Unified Marxist–Leninist)
2022	Surendra Raj Acharya	Nepali Congress
2026	Bikram Thapa	Rastriya Swatantra Party

=== Provincial Assembly ===
==== 2(A) ====
Election	Member	Party
2017	Driga Narayan Pandaya	CPN (Unified Marxist-Leninist)
May 2018	Driga Narayan Pandaya	Nepal Communist Party

==== 2(B) ====
Election	Member	Party
2017	Dharma Bahadur Lal Shriwastav	CPN (Unified Marxist-Leninist)
May 2018	Dharma Bahadur Lal Shriwastav	Nepal Communist Party
March 2021	Dharma Bahadur Lal Shriwastav	CPN (Unified Marxist-Leninist)

( in w20021)

== Election results ==
=== Election in the 2020s ===
==== 2022 general election ====
Candidate	Party	Votes	%
Surendra Raj Acharya	Nepali Congress	39,014	48.33
Brijesh Kumar Gupta	CPN (UML)	38,697	47.93
Sabita Sharma	Rastriya Prajatantra Party	1,574	1.95
Ekbal Ahmed Shah	Loktantrik Samajwadi Party, Nepal	1,123	1.39
Others		322	0.40
Total		80,730	100.00
Majority		317	
Nepali Congress gain			

=== Election in the 2010s ===
==== 2017 legislative elections ====
Party	Candidate	Votes
CPN (Unified Marxist–Leninist)	Brijesh Kumar Gupta	35,147
Nepali Congress	Surendra Raj Acharya	31,566
Rastriya Janata Party Nepal	Shatrudhan Vilas Singh Kurmi	2,048
Federal Socialist Forum, Nepal	Ram Newas Yadav	1,774
Others		1,379
Invalid votes		4,075
Result	CPN (UML) gain	
Source: Election Commission

==== 2017 Nepalese provincial elections ====
===== 2(A) =====
Party	Candidate	Votes
CPN (Unified Marxist–Leninist)	Driga Narayan Pandaya	19,244
Nepali Congress	Jwahar Lal Chaudhary	17,066
Federal Socialist Forum, Nepal	Mohammad Safiq Mansoori	1,529
Rastriya Janata Party Nepal	Omkar Nath Shukla	1,206
Others		969
Invalid votes		1,721
Result	CPN (UML) gain	
Source: Election Commission

===== 2(B) =====
Party	Candidate	Votes
CPN (Unified Marxist–Leninist)	Dharma Bahadur Lal Shriwastav	10,436
Nepali Congress	Sudhakar Pandaya	10,050
Independent	Raju Prasad Aryal	4,556
Federal Socialist Forum, Nepal	Brija Gopal Gupta	2,368
Rastriya Janata Party Nepal	Ram Dev Kalwar	1,748
Others		2,637
Invalid votes		2,359
Result	CPN (UML) gain	
Source: Election Commission

==== 2013 Constituent Assembly election ====
Party	Candidate	Votes
Independent	Atahar Kamal Musalman	4,674
Madheshi Janaadhikar Forum, Nepal	Sahas Ram Yadav	3,693
CPN (Unified Marxist–Leninist)	Ajijur Rehman Shesh	3,320
Rastriya Prajatantra Party	Rajesh Singh	2,888
Dalit Janajati Party	Abdul Rashid Khan	2,770
UCPN (Maoist)	Ram Laut Tiwari	2,750
Terai Madhesh Loktantrik Party	Madhusudan Sharan Chaudhary	2,612
Madheshi Janaadhikar Forum, Nepal (Democratic)	Dan Bahadur Kurmi	2,350
Nepali Congress	Rajesh Acharya	2,134
Others		5,382
Result	Independent gain	
Source: NepalNews

=== Election in the 2000s ===
==== 2008 Constituent Assembly election ====
Party	Candidate	Votes
Terai Madhesh Loktantrik Party	Dan Bahadur Kurmi	8,434
CPN (Maoist)	Ramlaut Tiwari	7,806
Nepali Congress	Atahar Kamal Musalman	6,180
Madheshi Janaadhikar Forum, Nepal	Shatrudhan Bilas Singh Kurmi	4,605
CPN (Unified Marxist–Leninist)	Sahas Ram Yadav	2,254
Sadbhavana Party	Nisar Ahmed Khan	1,732
Independent	Shyam Dev Nau	1,445
Rastriya Prajatantra Party Nepal	Hari Ram Kurmi	1,045
Others		2,612
Invalid votes		2,972
Result	TMLP gain	
Source: Election Commission

=== Election in the 1990s ===
==== 1999 legislative elections ====
Party	Candidate	Votes
Rastriya Prajatantra Party	Brijesh Kumar Gupta	24,699
Nepali Congress	Deep Kumar Upadhyaya	18,585
Rastriya Janamorcha	Durga Paudel	5,115
Others		1,926
Invalid votes		906
Result	RPP gain	
Source: Election Commission

==== 1994 legislative elections ====
Party	Candidate	Votes
Nepali Congress	Dipak Kumar Upadhyaya	18,878
Rastriya Prajatantra Party	Bhagwan Das Gupta	17,401
CPN (Unified Marxist–Leninist)	Rukmini Kunwar	3,328
Others		1,168
Result	Congress hold	
Source: Election Commission

==== 1991 legislative elections ====
Party	Candidate	Votes
Nepali Congress	Deep Kumar Upadhyaya	19,586
Rastriya Prajatantra Party (Thapa)		12,382
Result	Congress gain	

== See also ==
- List of parliamentary constituencies of Nepal
