= Balaram Adhikari =

Nepali politician

- बलराम अधिकारी

Minister of Land Management, Cooperatives and Poverty Alleviation of Nepal
- In office 15 July 2024 – 9 September 2025
- President: Ram Chandra Poudel
- Prime Minister: KP Sharma Oli
- Preceded by: Pushpa Kamal Dahal
- In office 6 March 2024 – 3 July 2024
- President: Ram Chandra Poudel
- Prime Minister: Pushpa Kamal Dahal
- Preceded by: Ranjeeta Shrestha
- Succeeded by: Pushpa Kamal Dahal

Member of Parliament, Pratinidhi Sabha
- In office 26 December 2022 – 12 September 2025
- Preceded by: Chakrapani Khanal
- Succeeded by: Mohan Lal Acharya
- Constituency: Kapilvastu 1

Personal details
- Born: 19 July 1960 (age 65) Madi Rural Municipality, Kaski Kapilvastu District
- Party: CPN (UML)
- Parents: Rudranath Adhikari (father); Saraswati Adhikari (mother)

Balaram Adhikari is a Nepalese politician, belonging to the CPN (UML) currently serving as a member of the 2nd Federal Parliament of Nepal. In the 2022 Nepalese general election, he was elected from the Kapilvastu 1 (constituency).

He served as Minister of Land Management, Cooperatives and Poverty Alleviation starting on 6th March 2024.
