= Mangal Prasad Tharu =

Nepalese politician

Personal details
- Party: Nepali Congress

Mangal Prasad Tharu (Nepali: मंगल प्रसाद थारु) is a Nepalese politician. He was elected to the Pratinidhi Sabha in the 1999 election on behalf of the Nepali Congress.

In the 2017 Nepalese provincial elections, Tharu ran for the Bardiya 1(B) of the Lumbini Provincial Assembly, and was defeated by Communist Party of Nepal (Maoist Centre) candidate Tilak Ram Sharma.
