= Devraj Pathak =

Nepalese politician

Honourable Devraj Pathak
- देवराज पाठक

Member of Parliament, Pratinidhi Sabha
- Incumbent
- Assumed office 26 March 2026
- Preceded by: Metmani Chaudhary
- Constituency: Dang 1

Personal details
- Born: 24 February 1966 (age 60) Gadhawa, Dang, Nepal
- Citizenship: Nepalese
- Party: Rastriya Swatantra Party (2022 – present)
- Parent: Thakur Prasad Pathak (father)
- Profession: Politician

Devraj Pathak (Nepali: देवराज पाठक) is a Nepalese politician and central committee member of Rastriya Swatantra Party, currently serving as a member of parliament. He was elected to the Pratinidhi Sabha, the lower house of the Federal Parliament of Nepal from Dang 1 parliamentary constituency in the 2026 Nepalese General Election. He secured 42,602 votes and defeated Yogendra Chaudhary of the Nepali Congress.

== Personal and academic life ==
Pathak was born in Gadhawa, Dang, Nepal, on February 24, 1966. He was born to Thakur Prasad Pathak. He passed the SLC from Bangaun Deukhuri Secondary School in 1983. After completing his Bachelor's degree in commerce, he did a Master's degree in sociology and social values in 1999 and 2001, respectively.

== Professional life ==
At the age of 20, he joined the teaching profession in Dang district. During his tenure, he served as district vice president of the Teacher Association, Dang.

== Politics ==
He resigned as a teacher and joined the Rastriya Swatantra Party in 2022. He was a central committee member and party president of Lumibini province.

== Electoral performance ==
Election	Year	Constituency	Contested for	Political party	Result	Votes	% of votes	Ref.
Nepal general election	2026	Dang 1	Pratinidhi Sabha member	Rastriya Swatantra Party	Won	42,602	55.77%	
Nepal general election	2022	Dang 1	Pratinidhi Sabha member	Rastriya Swatantra Party	Lost	13,798	18.73%	
