= Rekha Sharma (Nepalese politician) =

Nepali politician and Minister of Information and Communications

- रेखा .शर्मा

Minister of Communication and Information Technology of Nepal
- In office 6 March 2024 – 15 March 2024
- President: Ram Chandra Poudel
- Prime Minister: Pushpa Kamal Dahal
- Vice President: Ram Sahaya Yadav
- Preceded by: herself
- Succeeded by: Prithvi Subba Gurung
- In office 17 January 2023 – 4 March 2024
- President: Bidhya Devi Bhandari; Ram Chandra Poudel
- Prime Minister: Pushpa Kamal Dahal
- Vice President: Nanda Kishor Pun; Ram Sahaya Yadav
- Preceded by: Gyanendra Bahadur Karki
- Succeeded by: herself

Minister of General Administration
- In office 19 October 2015 – 13 July 2016
- President: Ram Baran Yadav
- Prime Minister: KP Sharma Oli
- Vice President: Parmanand Jha
- Preceded by: Lal Babu Pandit
- Succeeded by: Keshav Kumar Budhathoki

Member of Parliament, Pratinidhi Sabha
- In office 22 December 2022 – 26 March 2026
- Preceded by: Krishna Bahadur Mahara
- Succeeded by: Bipin Kumar Acharya
- Constituency: Dang 2

Member of Parliament, Pratinidhi Sabha for CPN (Maoist Centre) party list
- In office 4 March 2018 – 18 September 2022

Member of Constituent Assembly for UCPN (Maoist) party list
- In office 21 January 2014 – 14 October 2017

Personal details
- Born: 25 September 1969 (age 56) Ghorahi, Dang District
- Party: CPN (Maoist Centre)
- Spouse: Krishna Dhoj Khadka
- Children: Aayushma Khadka; Samriddhi Khadka
- Parent(s): Giriraj Sharma (Father); Parvati Sharma Paudyal (Mother)

Rekha Sharma is a Nepalese politician and the former Minister of Communication and ICT. Ms. Sharma is a central committee member of the Nepal Communist Party Maoist. She was elected in the House of Representative from the Dang-2 district in the General Election 2022. She has performed the duty of Chief Whip of the party in the Constituent Assembly of 2070 BS and also in the house of representative in 2074 BS. Sheserved as a member of the 1st Federal Parliament of Nepal. In the 2017 Nepalese general election she was elected as a proportional representative from Khas Arya category.
