= Parbata D.C. =

Nepali politician

Parbata D.C. (Chaudhary)
- पार्वता डि.सी. (चौधरी)

Member of Parliament, Pratinidhi Sabha for Nepali Congress party list
- Incumbent
- Assumed office 4 March 2018

Member of Constituent Assembly
- In office 21 January 2012 – 14 October 2017
- Preceded by: Indrajit Tharu
- Succeeded by: Metmani Chaudhary
- Constituency: Dang 1

Personal details
- Born: 28 November 1966 (age 59)
- Party: Nepali Congress

Parbata D.C. Chaudhary (Nepali: पार्वती चौधरी) is a member of 2nd Nepalese Constituent Assembly. She won Dang–1 seat in 2013 Nepalese Constituent Assembly election from Nepali Congress.
