= Dharma Bahadur Chaudhary =

Nepalese politician

Honourable Dharma Bahadur Chaudhary
- धर्म बहादुर चौधरी

Member of Lumbini Provincial Assembly
- Incumbent
- Assumed office 2017
- Constituency: Bardiya 2(B)

Personal details
- Party: Nagrik Unmukti Party

Dharma Bahadur Chaudhary (Nepali: धर्म बहादुर चौधरी) is a Nepalese politician belonging to the Nagrik Unmukti Party. He is also a member of Lumbini Provincial Assembly for Bardiya 2(B). He is the current minister of Lumbini government.

Chaudhary who is parliamentary party leader of the party in Lumbini Provincial Assembly.
