= Bir Bahadur Rana =

Nepali politician

Honourable Bir Bahadur Rana
- वीर बहादुर राणा

Minister for Energy, Water Resource and Irrigation of Lumbini Province
- Incumbent
- Assumed office 10 October 2021
- Governor: Amik Sherchan

Province Assembly Member of Lumbini Province
- Incumbent
- Assumed office 2017
- Preceded by: Assembly Created

Personal details
- Born: Palpa, Lumbini Province, Nepal
- Party: Nepali Congress
- Website: ocmcm.p5.gov.np

Bir Bahadur Rana (Nepali: वीर बहादुर राणा) is a Nepali politician of Nepali Congress and Minister for Energy, Water Resource and Irrigation since 10 October 2021. He is also serving as member of the Provincial Assembly of Lumbini Province. Sharma, a resident of Palpa, was elected to the 2017 provincial assembly elections from proportional list of the party.
