= Speaker of the Lumbini Provincial Assembly =

Presiding officer of the Lumbini Provincial Assembly

Speaker of the Lumbini Pradesh Sabha
- लुम्बिनी प्रदेशको सभामुख
- Incumbent; Tularam Gharti Magar since 18 January 2023
- Lumbini Provincial Assembly
- Style: The Hon’ble
- Member of: Lumbini Provincial Assembly
- Appointer: Members of the Lumbini Provincial Assembly
- Term length: During the life of the Pradesh Sabha (five years maximum)
- Constituting instrument: Constitution of Nepal
- Inaugural holder: Purna Bahadur Gharti Magar
- Formation: 2018 (8 years ago)

The Speaker of the Lumbini Provincial Assembly is the presiding officer (chair) of the Provincial Assembly of Lumbini Province. The speaker is elected generally in the first meeting of the Lumbini Provincial Assembly following provincial elections. Serving for a term of five years, the speaker is chosen from sitting members of the assembly.

The position of Speaker holds significant importance in the assembly process, presiding over the proceedings, maintaining order, and ensuring fair debate and discussion. The current speaker is Tularam Gharti Magar since 18 January 2023.

== Qualification ==
The Constitution of Nepal sets the qualifications required to become eligible for the office of the Speaker and Deputy Speaker. A Speaker and Deputy Speaker must meet the qualifications to become a member of the provincial assembly. A member of the provincial assembly must be:

- One who is a citizen of Nepal;
- One who is a voter of the concerned Province;
- One who has completed the age of twenty-five years;
- One who is not convicted of a criminal offense involving moral turpitude;
- One who is not disqualified by any law; and
- One who is not holding any office of profit.

== List of Speakers ==
No.	Name Constituency (lifespan)	Term of office			Assembly (election)	Party	Ref
No.	Name Constituency (lifespan)	Took office	Left office	Term	Assembly (election)	Party	Ref
1	Purna Bahadur Ghartimagar; MPA for Eastern Rukum 1 (B) (born 1967)	14 February 2018	18 September 2022	4 years, 216 days	1st (2018)	CPN (Maoist Centre)	
2	Tularam Gharti Magar; MPA for Palpa 2 (B) (born 1969)	18 January 2023	Incumbent	3 years, 233 days	2nd (2022)	CPN (Maoist Centre)	

== See also ==
- Speaker of the Koshi Provincial Assembly
- Speaker of the Bagmati Provincial Assembly
- Speaker of the Gandaki Provincial Assembly
- Speaker of the Karnali Provincial Assembly
- Speaker of the Sudurpashchim Provincial Assembly
