= Brijesh Kumar Gupta =

Nepali politician

- बृजेश कुमार गुप्ता

Member of Parliament, Pratinidhi Sabha
- In office 4 March 2018 – 18 September 2022
- Preceded by: Atahar Kamal Musalman
- Constituency: Kapilvastu 2
- In office May 1999 – May 2002
- Preceded by: Dipak Kumar Upadhyaya
- Succeeded by: Dan Bahadur Kurmi
- Constituency: Kapilvastu 2

Member of 1st and 2nd Constituent Assembly
- In office 28 May 2008 – 14 October 2017
- Preceded by: Birendra Kumar Kanodia
- Succeeded by: Abhishek Pratap Shah
- Constituency: Kapilvastu 3

Personal details
- Born: 3 December 1970 (age 55) Kapilvastu District
- Party: People's Progressive Party (2022–present)
- Other political affiliations: Rastriya Prajatantra Party (until 2007); TMLP (2007–2017); CPN (UML) (2017–2022)
- Parents: Bhagwan Das Gupta (father); Urmila Gupta (mother)

Brijesh Kumar Gupta (Nepali: बृजेश कुमार गुप्ता) is a Nepalese politician, belonging to the People's Progressive Party. In the 2008 and 2013 Constituent Assembly election he was elected from the Kapilvastu-3 constituency.

== Early life ==
Gupta was born to Bhagwan Das Gupta and his wife, in a village named Thulo Bargadawa previously known as Sahu Bargadawa in Kapilvastu Municipality-5 of Kapilvastu, Nepal.
