= Dilli Bahadur Chaudhary cabinet =

4th cabinet of Lumbini Province

- 5th Cabinet of Lumbini Province
- 2023–2024
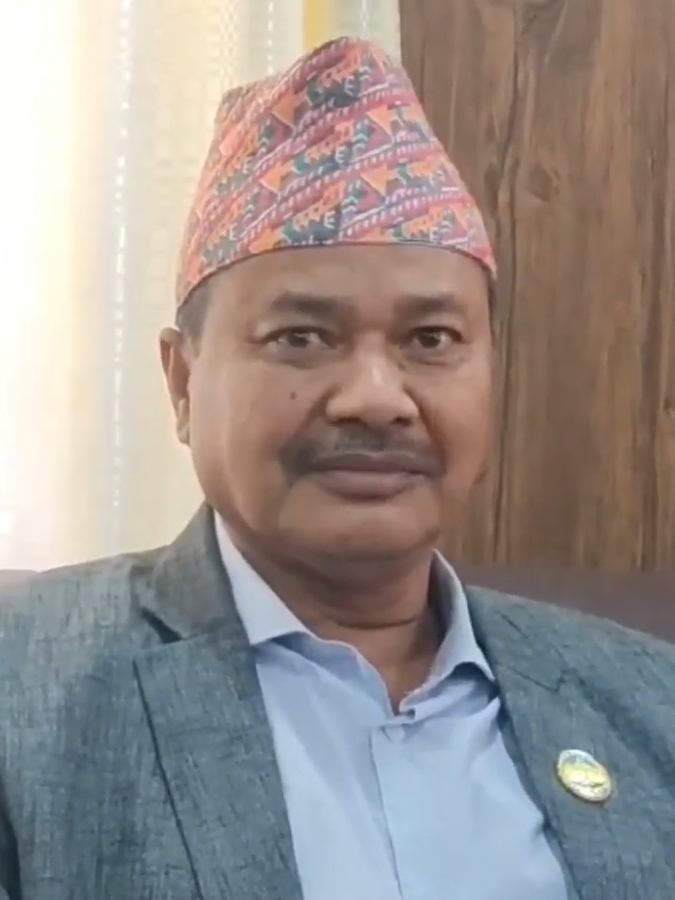
- Date formed: 27 April 2023
- Date dissolved: 4 April 2024

People and organisations
- Governor: Amik Sherchan
- Chief Minister: Dilli Bahadur Chaudhary
- Member parties: Nepali Congress Coalition partners: Nagrik Unmukti Party; Loktantrik Samajwadi
- Status in legislature: Provincial Assembly 53 / 87 (61%)
- Opposition party: CPN (UML)
- Opposition leader: Leela Giri

History
- Election: 2022
- Legislature term: 5 years
- Predecessor: Leela Giri cabinet
- Successor: Jokh Bahadur Mahara cabinet

The Dilli Bahadur Chaudhary cabinet is the 4th cabinet of Lumbini Province. It was formed after previous Chief minister, Lila Giri failed to win vote of confidence.

== Ministers by party ==
Party	Cabinet Ministers	Ministers of State	Total Ministers
Nepali Congress	4		
Nagrik Unmukti	2		
PSP-Nepal	2		
Loktantrik Samajwadi	1		
Janamat	1		

== Cabinet ministers ==
S.N.	Portfolio	Minister	Political Party	Took office	Left office
Cabinet ministers
1	Chief Minister	Dilli Bahadur Chaudhary	Nepali Congress	27 April 2023	4 April 2024
2	Minister for Health	Raju Khanal	Nepali Congress	22 May 2023	4 April 2024
3	Minister for Home Affairs	Santosh Kumar Pandeya	Loktantrik Samajwadi Party	17 July 2023	4 April 2024
4	Minister for Agriculture and Land Management	Bhandari Lal Ahir	People's Socialist Party	22 May 2023	4 April 2024
5	Minister for Social Development	Chandrakesh Gupta	Janamat Party	22 May 2023	4 April 2024
6	Minister for Physical Infrastructure Development	Dhan Bahadur Chaudhary	Nagrik Unmukti Party	27 April 2023	4 April 2024
7	Minister for Industry and Transport Management	Saroj Thapa	Nepali Congress	24 December 2023	4 April 2024

=== Until 6 March 2024 ===
S.N.	Portfolio	Minister	Political Party	Took office	Left office
Cabinet ministers
1	Chief Minister	Dilli Bahadur Chaudhary	Nepali Congress	27 April 2023	4 April 2024
2	Minister for Finance	Dhan Bahadur Maskey	CPN (Maoist Centre)	17 July 2023	6 March 2024
3	Minister for Health	Raju Khanal	Nepali Congress	22 May 2023	4 April 2024
4	Minister for Home Affairs	Santosh Kumar Pandeya	Loktantrik Samajwadi Party	17 July 2023	4 April 2024
5	Minister for Urban Development	Krishna KC	CPN (Maoist Centre)	24 December 2023	6 March 2024
6	Minister for Agriculture and Land Management	Bhandari Lal Ahir	People's Socialist Party	22 May 2023	4 April 2024
7	Minister for Social Development	Chandrakesh Gupta	Janamat Party	22 May 2023	4 April 2024
8	Minister for Physical Infrastructure Development	Dhan Bahadur Chaudhary	Nagrik Unmukti Party	27 April 2023	4 April 2024
9	Minister for Industry and Transport Management	Saroj Thapa	Nepali Congress	24 December 2023	4 April 2024

=== Until 17 July 2023 ===
S.N.	Portfolio	Minister	Political Party	Took office	Left office
Cabinet ministers
1	Chief Minister	Dilli Bahadur Chaudhary	Nepali Congress	27 April 2023	4 April 2024
2	Minister for Economic Affairs	Dhan Bahadur Maskey	CPN (Maoist Centre)	27 April 2023	17 July 2023
3	Minister for Health	Raju Khanal	Nepali Congress	22 May 2023	4 April 2024
4	Minister for Internal Affairs, Law and Cooperatives	Santosh Kumar Pandeya	Loktantrik Samajwadi Party	27 April 2023	17 July 2023
5	Minister for Agriculture and Land Management	Bhandari Lal Ahir	People's Socialist Party	22 May 2023	4 April 2024
6	Minister for Social Development	Chandrakesh Gupta	Janamat Party	22 May 2023	4 April 2024
7	Minister for Physical Infrastructure Development	Dhan Bahadur Chaudhary	Nagrik Unmukti Party	27 April 2023	4 April 2024

== See also ==
- Kedar Karki cabinet
- Kamal Bahadur Shah cabinet
- Surendra Raj Pandey cabinet
