= Sujita Shakya =

Nepalese politician

- सुजिता शाक्य

Member of Parliament, Pratinidhi Sabha for CPN (UML) party list
- In office 4 March 2018 – 18 September 2022

Personal details
- Born: 11 March 1966 (age 60)
- Party: Communist Party of Nepal (Unified Marxist-Leninist)
- Spouse: Shankar Pokharel
- Parent(s): Jwotiman Shakya (Father); Krishna Maya Shakya (Mother)

Sujita Shakya is a Nepalese politician, belonging to the Nepal Communist Party currently serving as the member of the 1st Federal Parliament of Nepal. In the 2017 Nepalese general election she was elected as a proportional representative from Indigenous peoples category.
