= Krishna Bahadur Gharti =

Nepalese politician

Honorable Krishna Bahadur Gharti Magar
- कृष्णबहादुर घर्तीमगर

4th Governor of Lumbini Province
- Incumbent
- Assumed office 1 August 2024
- President: Ram Chandra Poudel
- Prime Minister: Khadga Prasad Sharma Oli
- Chief Minister: Chet Narayan Acharya
- Preceded by: Amik Sherchan

Personal details
- Other political affiliations: Nepali Congress

Krishna Bahadur Gharti Magar (Nepali: कृष्णबहादुर घर्तीमगर) is the incumbent Governor of Lumbini Province. He was appointed Governor, as per the Article 163 (2) of the Constitution of Nepal by the President Ram Chandra Poudel on the recommendation of the Council of Ministers of the Government of Nepal on 1 August 2024. Magar replaces Amik Sherchan, and is the fourth Governor of Lumbini Province .
