= Kapilvastu 3 =

Parliamentary constituency in Nepal

- Parliamentary constituency
- Kapilvastu 3 in Lumbini Province
- Province: Lumbini Province
- District: Kapilvastu District

Current constituency
- Created: 1991
- Party: Nepali Congress
- Member of Parliament: Abhishek Pratap Shah

Kapilvastu 3 one of three parliamentary constituencies of Kapilvastu District in Nepal. This constituency came into existence on the Constituency Delimitation Commission (CDC) report submitted on 31 August 2017.

== Incorporated areas ==
Kapilvastu 3 incorporates Bijayanagar Rural Municipality, Shivaraj Municipality, Krishnanagar Municipality, and wards 5–7 of Maharajgunj Municipality

== Assembly segments ==
It encompasses the following Lumbini Provincial Assembly segment

- Kapilvastu 3(A)
- Kapilvastu 3(B)

== Members of Parliament ==
=== Parliament/Constituent Assembly ===
Election	Member	Party
1991	Bishnu Raj Acharya	Nepali Congress
1999	Birendra Kumar Kanudiya	Nepali Congress
2008	Brijesh Kumar Gupta	Terai Madhesh Loktantrik Party
April 2017	Brijesh Kumar Gupta	Rastriya Janata Party Nepal
2017	Abhishek Pratap Shah	Nepali Congress
2022	Mangal Prasad Gupta	CPN (UML)
2026	Abhishek Pratap Shah	Nepali Congress

=== Provincial Assembly ===
==== 3(A) ====
Election	Member	Party
2017	Arjun Kumar K.C.	CPN (Unified Marxist-Leninist)
May 2018	Arjun Kumar K.C.	Nepal Communist Party

==== 3(B) ====
Election	Member	Party
2017	Birendra Kumar Kanudiya	Nepali Congress

== Election results ==
=== Election in the 2020s ===
==== 2022 general election ====
Candidate	Party	Votes	%
Mangal Prasad Gupta	CPN (UML)	22,619	31.08
Abhishek Pratap Shah	Nepali Congress	18,983	26.08
Prakash Rajairiya	Rastriya Prajatantra Party	14,030	19.28
Ishwar Dayal Mishra	People's Progressive Party	12,557	17.25
Narsingh Chaudhary	Janamat Party	2,245	3.08
Deepak Belbase	Rastriya Swatantra Party	1,056	1.45
Others		1,284	1.76
Total		72,774	100.00
Majority		3,636	
CPN (UML) gain			

=== Election in the 2010s ===
==== 2017 legislative elections ====
Party	Candidate	Votes
Nepali Congress	Abhishek Pratap Shah	20,001
Federal Socialist Forum, Nepal	Mangal Prasad Gupta	15,826
People's Progressive Party	Ishwar Dayal Mishra	14,330
Bahujan Shakti Party	Ehsan Ahmed Khan	4,999
Rastriya Janata Party Nepal	Nar Singh Chaudhary	4,987
Nepal Federal Socialist Party	Mangal Prasad Chaudhary	1,073
Others		2,421
Invalid votes		5,265
Result	Congress gain	
Source: Election Commission

==== 2017 Nepalese provincial elections ====
===== 3(A) =====
Party	Candidate	Votes
CPN (Unified Marxist–Leninist)	Arjun Jumar K.C.	9,043
Rastriya Janata Party Nepal	Ravi Dutta Mishra	8,197
Nepali Congress	Ajay Thapa	6,861
Federal Socialist Forum, Nepal	Krishna Kumar Chaudhary	4,181
Bahujan Shakti Party	Mahesh Kumar Jaiswal	1,863
Independent	Mohammad Mustafa Khan	1,399
Independent	Ajit Kumar Singh	1,038
Others		2,505
Invalid votes		2,614
Result	CPN (UML) gain	
Source: Election Commission

===== 3(B) =====
Party	Candidate	Votes
Nepali Congress	Birendra Kumar Kanudiya	6,679
CPN (Maoist Centre)	Javed Alam Khan	6,307
Independent	Janaki Prasad Yadav	5,157
Federal Socialist Forum, Nepal	Shailesh Pratap Shah	3,317
Rastriya Janata Party Nepal	Ram Prakash Kurmi	3,172
Bahujan Shakti Party	Gauri Shankar Harijan	1,970
Others		1,727
Invalid votes		2,637
Result	Congress gain	
Source: Election Commission

==== 2013 Constituent Assembly election ====
Party	Candidate	Votes
Terai Madhesh Loktantrik Party	Brijesh Kumar Gupta	9,225
Nepali Congress	Sudhakar Pandaya	8,991
Madheshi Janaadhikar Forum, Nepal	Kedar Prasad Chaudhary	2,333
CPN (Unified Marxist–Leninist)	Babu Ram Khanal	2,077
Terai Madhesh Sadbhavana Party Nepal	Haram Sharif Musalman	1,947
Rastriya Prajatantra Party Nepal	Bijaya Laxmi Singh	1,660
UCPN (Maoist)	Satya Narayan Tripathi	1,640
Sadbhavana Party	Gayadin Kurmi	1,321
Dalit Janajati Party	Santosh Harijan	1,225
Others		2,798
Result	TMLP hold	
Source: NepalNews

=== Election in the 2000s ===
==== 2008 Constituent Assembly election ====
Party	Candidate	Votes
Terai Madhesh Loktantrik Party	Brijesh Kumar Gupta	18,126
Nepali Congress	Sudhakar Pandaya	5,944
CPN (Maoist)	Megh Raj Gyawali	5,930
Rastriya Prajatantra Party Nepal	Narayan Bahadur Singh	1,606
Rastriya Prajatantra Party	Nazma Khatun	1,444
CPN (Unified Marxist–Leninist)	Azad Ahmed Darji	1,000
Others		3,167
Invalid votes		2,717
Result	TMLP gain	
Source: Election Commission

=== Election in the 1990s ===
==== 1999 legislative elections ====
Party	Candidate	Votes
Nepali Congress	Birendra Kumar Kanudiya	12,261
Independent	Surendra Raj Acharya	8,759
Rastriya Prajatantra Party (Chand)	Hari Narayan Rajauriya	7,927
Rastriya Prajatantra Party	Akbal Ahmed Sah	6,418
CPN (Unified Marxist–Leninist)	Bal Ram Adhikari	5,663
Nepal Sadbhavana Party	Amrita Devi Agrahari	2,891
Others		1,342
Invalid votes		1,384
Result	Congress hold	
Source: Election Commission

==== 1994 legislative elections ====
Party	Candidate	Votes
Nepali Congress	Bishnu Raj Acharya	15,698
Rastriya Prajatantra Party	Hari Narayan Rajauriya	12,019
CPN (Unified Marxist–Leninist)	Akbal Ahmed Sah	5,835
Nepal Sadbhavana Party	Narsingh Chaudhary	1,536
Independent	Rupesh Shrestha	1,371
Others		376
Result	Congress hold	
Source: Election Commission

==== 1991 legislative elections ====
Party	Candidate	Votes
Nepali Congress	Bishnu Raj Acharya	13,681
Nepal Sadbhavana Party		4,510
Result	Congress gain	

== See also ==
- List of parliamentary constituencies of Nepal
