= Dang 2 =

Parliamentary constituency in Nepal

- Parliamentary constituency
- Dang 2 in Lumbini Province
- Province: Lumbini Province
- District: Dang District

Current constituency
- Created: 1991
- Party: Rastriya Swatantra Party
- Member of Parliament: Bipin Kumar Acharya
- Member of the Provincial Assembly: Shankar Pokharel, (UML)

Dang 2 one of three parliamentary constituencies of Dang District in Nepal. This constituency came into existence on the Constituency Delimitation Commission (CDC) report submitted on 31 August 2017.

== Incorporated areas ==
Dang 2 incorporates Banglachuli Rural Municipality, wards 4 and 6–19 of Ghorahi Sub-metropolitan City, and wards 16–19 of Tulsipur Sub-metropolitan City.

== Assembly segments ==
It encompasses the following Lumbini Provincial Assembly segment

- Dang 2(A)
- Dang 2(B)

== Members of Parliament ==
=== Parliament/Constituent Assembly ===
Election	Member	Party
1991	Shiva Raj Gautam	CPN (Unified Marxist–Leninist)
1994	Bal Dev Sharma	Nepali Congress
2008	Dama Kumari Sharma	CPN (Maoist)
January 2009	Dama Kumari Sharma	UCPN (Maoist)
2013	Sushila Chaudhary	Nepali Congress
2017	Krishna Bahadur Mahara	CPN (Maoist Centre)
May 2018	Krishna Bahadur Mahara	Nepal Communist Party
March 2021	Krishna Bahadur Mahara	CPN (Maoist Centre)
2022	Rekha Sharma	CPN (Maoist Centre)
2026	Bipin Kumar Acharya	Rastriya Swatantra Party

=== Provincial Assembly ===
==== 2(A) ====
Election	Member	Party
2017	Shankar Pokharel	CPN (Unified Marxist-Leninist)
May 2018	Shankar Pokharel	Nepal Communist Party

==== 2(B) ====
Election	Member	Party
2017	Amar Bahadur Dangi Chhetri	CPN (Unified Marxist-Leninist)
May 2018	Amar Bahadur Dangi Chhetri	Nepal Communist Party

== Election results ==
=== Election in the 2020s ===
==== 2026 general election ====
Candidate	Party	Votes	%
Bipin Kumar Acharya	Rastriya Swatantra Party	43,559	54.83
Shankar Pokharel	CPN (UML)	15,287	19.24
Kiran Kishor Ghimire	Nepali Congress	11,558	14.55
Nirmal Acharya	Nepali Communist Party	7,083	8.92
Rishi Kesh Pokhrel	Rastriya Prajatantra Party	760	0.96
Others		1,193	1.50
Total		79,440	100.00
Majority		28,272	
Rastriya Swatantra Party gain from CPN (Maoist Centre)			

==== 2022 general election ====
Candidate	Party	Votes	%
Rekha Sharma	CPN (Maoist Centre)	26,880	36.07
Shankar Pokharel	CPN (UML)	26,687	35.81
Bishal Adhikari	Rastriya Swatantra Party	15,861	21.28
Bholanath Yogi	Rastriya Prajatantra Party	2,273	3.05
Others		2,829	3.80
Total		74,530	100.00
Majority		193	
CPN (Maoist Centre) hold			

=== Election in the 2010s ===
==== 2017 legislative elections ====
Party	Candidate	Votes
CPN (Maoist Centre)	Krishna Bahadur Mahara	40,042
Nepali Congress	Raju Khanal	25,897
CPN (Marxist–Leninist)	Bhoj Bahadur Bishwakarma	2,204
Others		1,342
Invalid votes		4,284
Result	Maoist Centre gain	
Source: Election Commission

==== 2017 Nepalese provincial elections ====
===== 2(A) =====
Party	Candidate	Votes
CPN (Unified Marxist-Leninist)	Shankar Pokharel	20,723
Nepali Congress	Kamal Kishore Sharma Ghimire	11,172
CPN (Marxist-Leninist)	Kapil Dev Pokharel	1,186
Others		492
Invalid votes		1,732
Result	CPN (UML) gain	
Source: Election Commission

===== 2(B) =====
Party	Candidate	Votes
CPN (Unified Marxist–Leninist)	Amar Bahadur Dangi Chhetri	21,450
Nepali Congress	Bharat Bahadur Neupane	13,190
CPN (Marxist-Leninist)	Jit Bahadur Wali	1,233
Others		623
Invalid votes		2,035
Result	CPN (UML) gain	
Source: Election Commission

==== 2013 Constituent Assembly election ====
Party	Candidate	Votes
Nepali Congress	Sushila Chaudhary	10,430
UCPN (Maoist)	Hom Bahadur Pun	8,590
CPN (Unified Marxist–Leninist)	Shanta Chaudhary	7,402
Rastriya Janamorcha	Shashidhar Bhandari	1,856
CPN (Marxist–Leninist)	Govinda Bahadur K.K.	1,093
Others		2,008
Result	Congress gain	
Source: NepalNews

=== Election in the 2000s ===
==== 2008 Constituent Assembly election ====
Party	Candidate	Votes
CPN (Maoist)	Dama Kumari Sharma	20,240
Nepali Congress	Krishna Kishor Ghimire	6,930
CPN (Unified Marxist–Leninist)	Naru Lal Chaudhary	5,442
CPN (Marxist–Leninist)	Prabhu Chaudhary	2,913
Rastriya Janamorcha	Lal Mani Sharma	1,252
Others		1,718
Invalid votes		1,512
Result	Maoist gain	
Source: Election Commission

=== Election in the 1990s ===
==== 1999 legislative elections ====
Party	Candidate	Votes
Nepali Congress	Bal Dev Sharma	14,811
CPN (Unified Marxist–Leninist)	Chhabi Lal Oli	8,463
CPN (Marxist–Leninist)	Sushma Ghimire	5,550
Rastriya Prajatantra Party	Dinesh Bahadur Neupane	5,386
Rastriya Janamukti Party	Khadga Bahadur Budha Magar	1,678
Others		586
Invalid votes		1,667
Result	Congress hold	
Source: Election Commission

==== 1994 legislative elections ====
Party	Candidate	Votes
Nepali Congress	Bal Dev Sharma	12,560
CPN (Unified Marxist–Leninist)	Sushma Sharma	9,695
Rastriya Prajatantra Party	Rana Bahadur Shah	9,330
Others		504
Result	Congress gain	
Source: Election Commission

==== 1991 legislative elections ====
Party	Candidate	Votes
CPN (Unified Marxist–Leninist)	Shiva Raj Gautam	20,590
Nepali Congress		19,322
Result	CPN (UML) gain	

== See also ==
- List of parliamentary constituencies of Nepal
