= Hari Prasad Bhusal =

Nepalese politician

Honourable Hari Prasad Bhusal
- हरीप्रसाद भुसाल

Member of Parliament, Pratinidhi Sabha
- Incumbent
- Assumed office 26 March 2026
- Preceded by: Top Bahadur Rayamajhi
- Constituency: Arghakhanchi 1

Personal details
- Born: 9 November 1988 (age 38)
- Party: Rastriya Swatantra Party
- Spouse: Ambika Bhusal
- Parent: Dol Prasad Bhusal (father)

Hari Prasad Bhusal (Note: Nepali: हरीप्रसाद भुसाल) (born 9 November 1988) is a Nepalese politician who has been the Member of Parliament (MP) for Arghakhanchi 1.

== Political career ==
Bhusal contested the 2022 general election in Arghakhanchi 1 from Rastriya Swatantra Party but finished a distant third.

Bhusal was elected as the Arghakhanchi district president of Rastriya Swatantra Party in December 2024. Bhusal was elected to the Pratinidhi Sabha from Arghakhanchi 1 at the 2026 general election.
