= Bipin Kumar Acharya =

General Secretary of the Rastriya Swatantra Party

- विपिन कुमार आचार्य

Member of Parliament, Pratinidhi Sabha
- Elected
- Assumed office 27 March 2026
- Preceded by: Rekha Sharma
- Constituency: Dang 2

General Secretary of Rastriya Swatantra Party
- Incumbent
- Assumed office 26 June 2026
- President: Rabi Lamichhane
- Preceded by: Kabindra Burlakoti

Joint General Secretary of Rastriya Swatantra Party
- In office 4 May 2025 – 26 June 2026
- President: Rabi Lamichhane
- Preceded by: Sumana Shrestha

Personal details
- Party: Rastriya Swatantra

Bipin Kumar Acharya is a Nepalese politician serving as the general secretary from the Rastriya Swatantra Party. He is the member of the 3rd Federal Parliament of Nepal elected from Dang 2 constituency in 2026 Nepalese General Election securing 43,557 votes and defeating Shankar Pokhrel of the CPN-UML.

He was the core team member in the initial formation of Rastriya Swatantra Party back in 2022.

== General Secretary of the RSP ==
Acharya was elected General Secretary of the Rastriya Swatantra Party at the party's first general convention, held in Chitwan on 26 June 2026. He had previously served as the party's Joint General Secretary from May 2025.
