= Backward Society Education =

- Founded: 1991
- Founder: Hon.Dilli Bahadur Chaudhary
- Type: Non-profit; NGO
- Location: Nepal
- Website: BASE website

Backward Society Education (BASE) is a nonprofit non-governmental organization that works with Tharu in Western Nepal to fight illiteracy, bonded labor from the Kamaiya system, and a number of other issues in the region. The group received the 2002 Anti-Slavery Award from the Anti-Slavery International for its work in combating bonded labor, and the Danish International Development Agency reported in 2002, "BASE is running the only literacy campaign in the country." They are currently working on initiatives to help people who have been freed from bonded labor.

== Organization ==
=== Founding and campaign against Kamiya ===
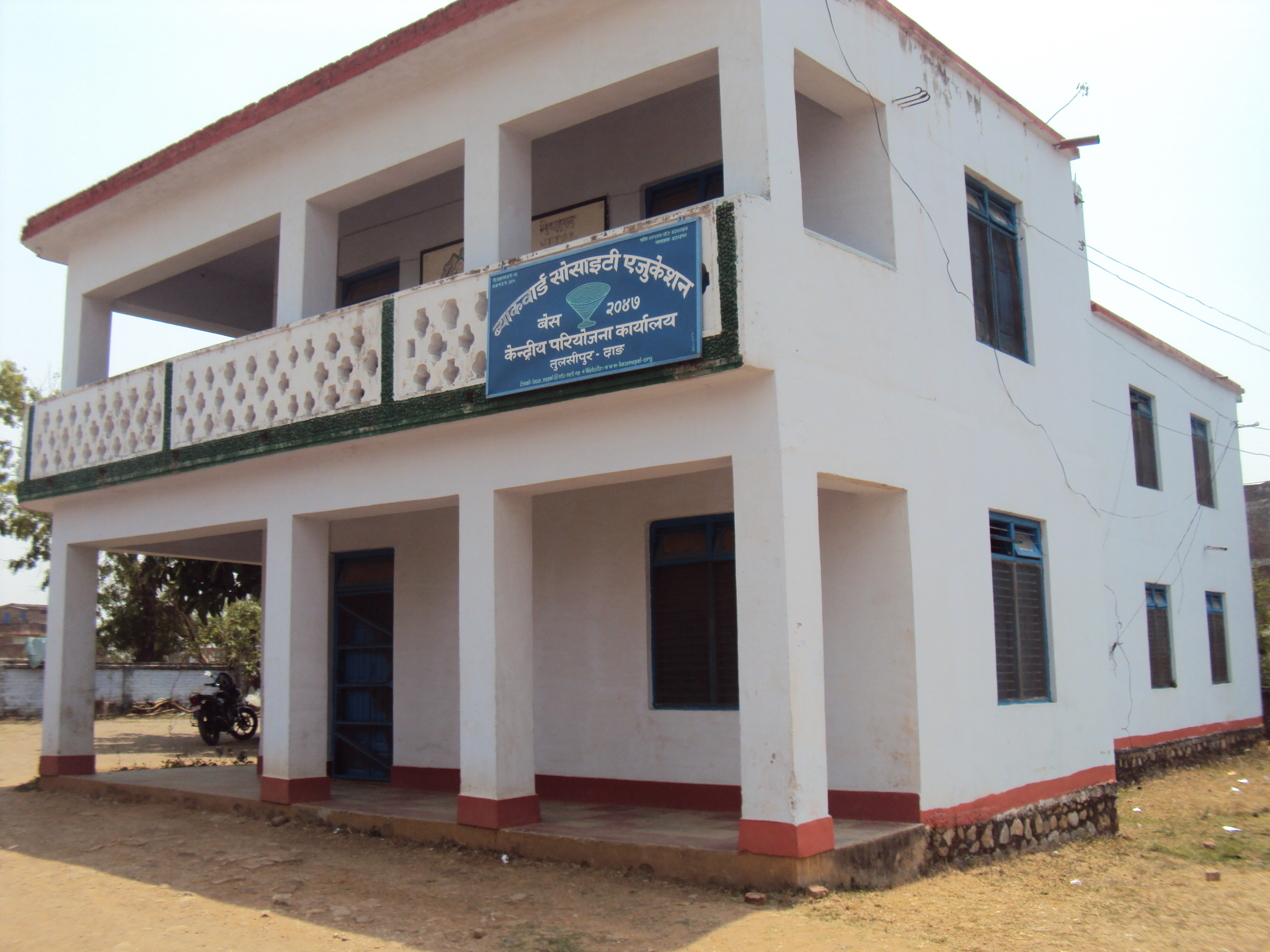
One of BASE's offices that is located in Western Nepal

The eventual founder of BASE, Dilli Bahadur Chaudhari, formed a group called the 4-H Club which was funded through intermediaries by USAID as a forum for discussing agricultural techniques with Tharu farmers. This club quickly grew in size and scope, and club meetings often railed against oppression from the upper castes of Nepal against the Tharu. In 1991, the organization was formally founded and renamed to its currently name, Backward Society Education. This was decided partly because it was recognized that landlords who forced people to work in the Kamaiya bonded labor system feared that their laborers would be educated, and partly because an English language name and abbreviation would be more successful at receiving international attention. Dilli Bahadur Chaudhari's 1994 Reebok Human Rights Award and his audience with King Gyanendra of Nepal after receiving the award greatly expanded BASE's reputation and it was quickly able to gain grants from foreign non-governmental organizations. After trying to intensely lobby the government to free people stuck in the Kamaiya system, Chaudhari decided to start protests instead.

The government acquiesced to BASE's demands and formally barred the practice of bonded labor in Nepal, following large protests in July 2000 from people in the Kamaiya system and pressure from foreign and domestic NGOs, much of which had been instigated by BASE. After hearing the news, BASE went door to door in Western Nepal to tell bonded laborers about their newly decreed freedom and helped to enforce the new law, and the Nepali Times noted at the time that BASE's Dilli Bahadur Chaudhari helped to "spark off the movement to free kamaiyas". Despite this success, less than half of the families that were freed from bonded labor have received government plots of land, and many still live off of less than $1 a day. One of BASE's main goals today is to work with people who have no way to provide for themselves after being set free. IRIN reported that BASE was "responsible for spearheading the movement against slavery." BASE received the 2002 Anti-Slavery Award from Anti-Slavery International because of its work on fighting the exploitation and bonded labor of the Tharu.

=== Literacy campaign ===
The Danish International Development Agency (DANIDA) reported that BASE runs the "only literacy campaign in the country" and that the organization runs hundreds of schools in Western Nepal. A number of stories in Nepali news have reported on individual success stories of BASE's educational classes for people who had previously been bonded laborers. Many ex-Kamaiya struggle to adapt, however, as the Nepali Times reports that many still worked in exploitative conditions five years after being freed.

=== Other challenges ===
The Nepalese Maoists have attacked BASE workers. A large bomb was detonated by the Maoists at BASE's office in Dhangadi which forced BASE to suspend operations temporarily. In 2006, Maoists threatened to attack BASE if they did not hand over control of a local radio station in Ghodaghodi Tal.
