= Mangal Prasad Gupta =

Nepali politician (1945–2026)

- मंगलप्रसाद गुप्‍ता

Member of Parliament, Pratinidhi Sabha
- In office 26 December 2022 – 12 September 2025
- Preceded by: Abhishek Pratap Shah
- Succeeded by: Abhishek Pratap Shah
- Constituency: Kapilvastu 3

Personal details
- Born: 8 August 1945 Kapilvastu District, Nepal
- Died: 7 June 2026 (aged 80) New Delhi, India
- Party: CPN (UML)

Mangal Prasad Gupta (8 August 1945 – 7 June 2026) was a Nepalese politician who belonged to the CPN (UML) and served as a member of the 2nd Federal Parliament of Nepal. In the 2022 Nepalese general election, he was elected from the Kapilvastu 3 (constituency). Gupta died in New Delhi on 7 June 2026, at the age of 80.
