= Chakrapani Khanal =

Nepalese politician

Honourable Chakrapani Khanal
- चक्रपाणी खनाल

Minister for Agricultural and Livestock Development
- In office 16 March 2018 – 20 November 2019
- President: Bidhya Devi Bhandari
- Prime Minister: K. P. Oli
- Preceded by: Ram Krishna Yadav
- Succeeded by: Ghanashyam Bhusal

Member of Parliament, Pratinidhi Sabha from Kapilvastu 1
- Incumbent
- Assumed office 4 March 2018
- Preceded by: Bal Ram Adhikari
- Constituency: Kapilvastu 1

Personal details
- Born: 2 April 1962 (age 64) Dhakawang, Arghakhanchi
- Party: CPN (Maoist Centre)
- Other political affiliations: CPN (Fourth Convention); CPN (Mashal); CPN (Unity Centre)
- Children: 2
- Website: https://www.facebook.com/baldevkhanal.np/
- Nickname: Baldev

Chakrapani Khanal, also known by his code name Baldev, is a Nepali communist politician and the current Member of Parliament (MP) from Kapilvastu 1. His father name is Bhagirath Khanal and his mother name is Muma Devi Khanal. His children are Mirul Khanal and Mission Khanal. He has served as the Minister for Agricultural and Livestock Development and as chief political adviser to Pushpa Kamal Dahal during his second prime ministership. He is standing committee member and secretary of Communist Party of Nepal (Maoist-Centre). He also served during the insurgency period as one of 4 deputy commanders of People's Liberation Army. He lives in Kapilvastu, Nepal. He is also current Lumbini Province incharge for NCP (Maoist Centre). In his period as minister he stop the import of milk and meat from India to help the Nepalese farmer, so they can get more price for their product. He was removed from position of minister in 20 November 2019 by Prime Minister at that time K.P Sharma Oli due to pressure from India a per different source. In his small tenure he was praised by many for his work and his standing support for Nepalese farmers. After he was succeeded by Ghanashyam Bhusal. The import banned was uplifted which was criticized by many farmers.

== Electoral history ==
2017 House of Representatives Election

Kapilvastu-1

Party	Candidate	Votes	Status
Communist Party of Nepal (Maoist Centre)	Chakrapani Khanal	29,799	Elected
Nepali Congress	Dip Kumar Upadhaya	28,853	Lost
