= Dang 1 =

Parliamentary constituency in Nepal

- Parliamentary constituency
- Dang 1 in Lumbini Province
- Province: Lumbini Province
- District: Dang District

Current constituency
- Created: 1991
- Party: Rastriya Swatantra Party
- Member of Parliament: Devraj Pathak

Dang 1 one of three parliamentary constituencies of Dang District in Nepal. This constituency came into existence on the Constituency Delimitation Commission (CDC) report submitted on 31 August 2017.

== Incorporated areas ==
Dang 1 incorporates Gadhawa Rural Municipality, Rapti Rural Municipality, Rajpur Rual Municipality, Lamahi Municipality, and wards 1–3 and 5 of Ghorahi Sub-metropolitan City.

== Assembly segments ==
It encompasses the following Lumbini Provincial Assembly segment

- Dang 1(A)
- Dang 1(B)

== Members of Parliament ==
=== Parliament/Constituent Assembly ===
Election	Member	Party
1991	Hari Prasad Chaudhary	Nepali Congress
1999	Khum Bahadur Khadka	Nepali Congress
2008	Indrajit Tharu	CPN (Maoist)
January 2009	Indrajit Tharu	UCPN (Maoist)
2013	Parbati D.C. Chaudhary	Nepali Congress
2017	Metmani Chaudhary	CPN (Unified Marxist–Leninist)
May 2018	Metmani Chaudhary	Nepal Communist Party
March 2021	Metmani Chaudhary	CPN (Unified Marxist–Leninist)
August 2021	Metmani Chaudhary	CPN (Unified Socialist)
2026	Devraj Pathak	Rastriya Swatantra Party

=== Provincial Assembly ===
==== 1(A) ====
Election	Member	Party
2017	Indrajit Tharu	CPN (Maoist Centre)
May 2018	Indrajit Tharu	Nepal Communist Party

==== 1(B) ====
Election	Member	Party
2017	Rewati Raman Sharma	CPN (Unified Marxist-Leninist)
May 2018	Rewati Raman Sharma	Nepal Communist Party

== Election results ==
=== Election in the 2020s ===
==== 2026 general election ====
Candidate	Party	Votes	%
Devraj Pathak	Rastriya Swatantra Party	42,602	55.77
Yogendra Chaudhary	Nepali Congress	15,280	20.00
Rewatiram Sharma Ghimire	CPN (UML)	6,825	8.93
Metmani Chaudhary	Nepali Communist Party	4,965	6.50
Prakash Shahi	Communist Party of Nepal (Maoist)	1,472	1.93
Others		5,245	6.87
Total		76,389	100.00
Majority		27,322	
Rastriya Swatantra Party gain from CPN (Unified Socialist)			

==== 2022 general election ====
Candidate	Party	Votes	%
Metmani Chaudhary	CPN (Unified Socialist)	26,576	36.07
Shanta Chaudhary	CPN (UML)	21,493	29.17
Devraj Pathak	Rastriya Swatantra Party	13,798	18.73
Surendra Chaudhary	Nagrik Unmukti Party	8,019	10.88
Lila Budhathoki	Rastriya Prajatantra Party	1,439	1.95
Ganga Chaudhary Satgauwa	Hamro Nepali Party	1,093	1.48
Others		1,269	1.72
Total		73,687	100.00
Majority		5,083	
CPN (Unified Socialist) hold			

=== Election in the 2010s ===
==== 2017 legislative elections ====
Party	Candidate	Votes
CPN (Unified Marxist–Leninist)	Metmani Chaudhary	37,908
Nepali Congress	Sushila Chaudhary	24,074
Rastriya Janamorcha	Kapil Dev Khanal	3,784
CPN (Marxist–Leninist)	Rekha K.C.	2,012
Others		1,802
Invalid votes		4,004
Result	CPN (UML) gain	
Source: Election Commission

==== 2017 Nepalese provincial elections ====
===== 1(A) =====
Party	Candidate	Votes
CPN (Maoist Centre)	Indrajit Tharu	17,285
Nepali Congress	Pradeep Thapa	11,392
Rastriya Janamorcha	Jagat Prasad Pokharel	4,958
CPN (Marxist-Leninist)	Sabita G.C. Pandey	1,212
Others		970
Invalid votes		2,695
Result	Maoist Centre gain	
Source: Election Commission

===== 1(B) =====
Party	Candidate	Votes
CPN (Unified Marxist–Leninist)	Rewati Raman Sharma	19,354
Nepali Congress	Janaki Lal Basnet	12,753
Others		2,187
Invalid votes		1,801
Result	CPN (UML) gain	
Source: Election Commission

==== 2013 Constituent Assembly election ====
Party	Candidate	Votes
Nepali Congress	Parbati D.C. Chaudhary	8,719
CPN (Unified Marxist–Leninist)	Rewati Raman Sharma Ghimire	7,075
UCPN (Maoist)	Narayani Sharma	5,608
Madhesi Janaadhikar Forum, Nepal (Democratic)	Birendra Kumar Chaudhary	4,649
Independent	Lila Ram Khanal	1,953
Rastriya Janamorcha	Om Bahadur K.C.	1,008
Others		3,954
Result	Congress gain	
Source: NepalNews

=== Election in the 2000s ===
==== 2008 Constituent Assembly election ====
Party	Candidate	Votes
CPN (Maoist)	Indrajit Tharu	18,093
Nepali Congress	Khum Bahadur Khadka	10,175
CPN (Unified Marxist–Leninist)	Rewati Raman Sharma Ghimire	4,692
CPN (Marxist–Leninist)	Tilak Ram Basnet	2,809
Sanghiya Loktantrik Rastriya Manch	Yogendra Tharu Chaudhary	2,769
Others		2,721
Invalid votes		2,105
Result	Maoist gain	
Source: Election Commission

=== Election in the 1990s ===
==== 1999 legislative elections ====
Party	Candidate	Votes
Nepali Congress	Khum Bahadur Khadka	27,865
Rastriya Prajatantra Party	Parshu Narayan Chaudhary	9,159
CPN (Unified Marxist–Leninist)	Saraswati Gautam	5,021
CPN (Marxist–Leninist)	Khem Narayan Chaudhary	1,684
Rastriya Janamorcha	Rashmi Raj Nepali	1,356
Others		587
Invalid votes		1,539
Result	Congress hold	
Source: Election Commission

==== 1994 legislative elections ====
Party	Candidate	Votes
Nepali Congress	Hari Prasad Chaudhary	12,333
Rastriya Prajatantra Party	Parshu Narayan Chaudhary	11,024
CPN (Unified Marxist–Leninist)	Bhagwati Chaudhary	7,044
Independent	Rashmi Raj Nepali	1,605
Others		314
Result	Congress hold	
Source: Election Commission

==== 1991 legislative elections ====
Party	Candidate	Votes
Nepali Congress	Hari Prasad Chaudhary	16,435
CPN (Unified Marxist–Leninist)		12,535
Result	Congress gain	

== See also ==
- List of parliamentary constituencies of Nepal
