= Abhishek Pratap Shah =

Nepali politician

Honourable Abhishek Pratap Shah
- अभिषेक प्रताप शाह
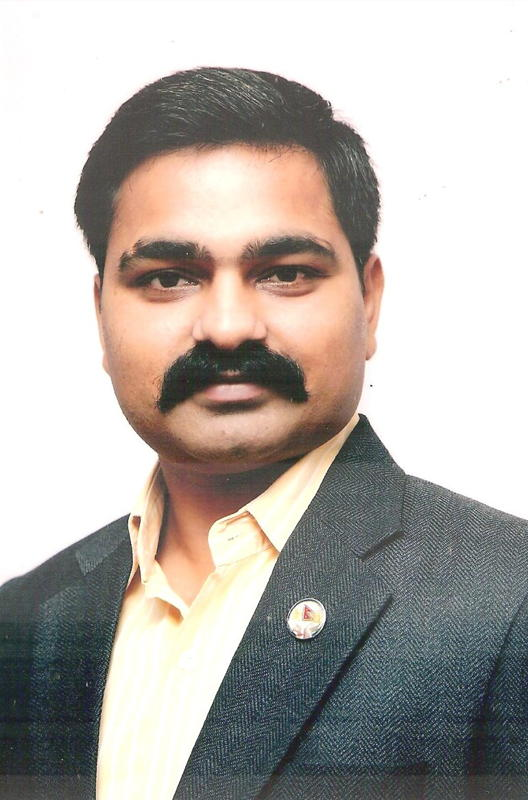
- Shah in 2010

Member of Parliament, Pratinidhi Sabha
- Incumbent
- Assumed office 26 March 2026
- Preceded by: Mangal Prasad Gupta
- Constituency: Kapilvastu 3
- In office 4 March 2018 – 26 December 2022
- Preceded by: Brijesh Kumar Gupta
- Succeeded by: Mangal Prasad Gupta
- Constituency: Kapilvastu 3

Member of the Constituent Assembly
- In office 28 May 2008 – 14 October 2017

Personal details
- Born: 5 October 1982 (age 43) Kapilvastu District
- Citizenship: Nepali
- Party: Nepali Congress (2017–present)
- Other political affiliations: RPP (until 2008); MJFN (2008–15); FSFN (2015–17)
- Spouse: Minakshi Singh Shah
- Children: 3
- Parents: Ajay Pratap Shah (father); Sarojani Shah (mother)

Abhishek Pratap Shah (Nepali: अभिषेक प्रताप शाह, born 1 October 1982) is a Nepalese politician belonging to Nepali Congress. He is Deputy Leader of opposition. Also he serves as the member of parliament for Kapilvastu 3. He was previously a member of the first and second Constituent Assembly of Nepal representing Kapilvastu 5. Shah filed a complaint against former prime minister K. P. Sharma Oli for firing on the protesters in the Gen Z strike.

== Personal life ==
Shah has a Bachelor of Business Administration (BBA) degree from Babu Banarasi Das National Institute of Technology and Management in Lucknow.

== Political career ==
In January 2008, Shah was nominated to the interim parliament, taking the seat of his deceased father Ajay Pratap Shah who was an MP for the Rastriya Prajatantra Party. In March 2008 he resigned from the interim legislature, and joined the Madheshi Janaadhikar Forum, Nepal. In the April 2008 Constituent Assembly election he was elected from the Kapilvastu 5 constituency, winning 15,694 votes. Shah was the youngest member elected to the 1st Constituent Assembly of Nepal. He was re-elected from the same constituency in the 2013 Constituent Assembly elections.

In 2017 he left the Federal Socialist Forum, Nepal and joined Nepali Congress ahead of the 2017 general election. He was elected from Kapilvastu 3 securing 20,001 votes. He was a member in the Industry, Commerce, Labour and Consumer Welfare Committee of the House of Representatives.
