= Bikram Thapa =

Nepalese politician

The Honourable Bikram Thapa
- बिक्रम थापा

Member of Parliament, Pratinidhi Sabha
- Incumbent
- Assumed office 26 March 2026
- Preceded by: Surendra Raj Acharya
- Constituency: Kapilvastu 2

Personal details
- Citizenship: Nepalese
- Party: Rastriya Swatantra Party
- Profession: Politician; Police

Bikram Thapa (Nepali: बिक्रम थापा) is a Nepalese politician serving as a member of parliament from the Rastriya Swatantra Party. He is the member of the 7th Pratinidhi Sabha elected from Kapilvastu 2 constituency in 2026 Nepalese General Election securing 27,635 votes and defeating his closest contender Surendra Raj Acharya of the Nepali Congress. He is also a former Senior Superintendent Police (SSP) of Nepal.
