= Atahar Kamal Musalman =

Nepalese politician

- अतहर कमल मुसलमान

Member of Parliament, Pratinidhi Sabha for Nepali Congress party list
- Incumbent
- Assumed office 4 March 2018

Member of Constituent Assembly
- In office 21 January 2014 – 14 October 2017
- Preceded by: Dan Bahadur Kurmi
- Succeeded by: Brijesh Kumar Gupta
- Constituency: Kapilvastu 2

Personal details
- Born: 11 May 1970 (age 55) Kapilvastu District
- Party: Nepali Congress
- Spouse: Devkala Subedi
- Children: 2
- Parents: Nisar Ahmed (father); Farida Musalman (mother)

Atahar Kamal Musalman is a Nepali politician and member of the House of Representatives of the federal parliament of Nepal, elected under the proportional representation system from Nepali Congress. In the previous parliament, he was elected as an independent lawmaker. He withdrew from the vice presidential race two hours after filing his candidacy, in support of the Nepali Congress candidate, in 2015.
