= Eastern Rukum 1 =

Parliamentary constituency in Nepal

- Parliamentary constituency
- Eastern Rukum 1 in Lumbini Province
- Province: Lumbini Province
- District: Eastern Rukum District

Current constituency
- Created: 2017
- Party: Nepal Communist Party
- Member of Parliament: Kamala Roka

Eastern Rukum 1 is the parliamentary constituency of Eastern Rukum District in Nepal. This constituency came into existence on the Constituency Delimitation Commission (CDC) report submitted on 31 August 2017.

== Incorporated areas ==
Eastern Rukum 1 incorporates the entirety of Eastern Rukum District.

== Assembly segments ==
It encompasses the following Lumbini Provincial Assembly segment

- Eastern Rukum 1(A)
- Eastern Rukum 1(B)

== Members of Parliament ==
=== Parliament/Constituent Assembly ===
Election	Member	Party
2017	Kamala Rokka	CPN (Maoist Centre)
May 2018	Kamala Rokka	Nepal Communist Party
March 2021	Kamala Rokka	CPN (Maoist Centre)
2022	Purna Bahadur Gharti	CPN (Maoist Centre)

=== Provincial Assembly ===
==== 1(A) ====
Election	Member	Party
2017	Tej Bahadur Wali	CPN (Maoist Centre)
May 2018	Tej Bahadur Wali	Nepal Communist Party

==== 1(B) ====
Election	Member	Party
2017	Purna Bahadur Gharti Magar	CPN (Maoist Centre)
May 2018	Purna Bahadur Gharti Magar	Nepal Communist Party

== Election results ==
=== Election in the 2020s ===
==== 2022 general election ====
Candidate	Party	Votes	%
Purna Bahadur Gharti	CPN (Maoist Centre)	12,262	62.17
Kailash Kumar Malla	CPN (UML)	5,211	26.42
Others		2,249	11.40
Total		19,722	100.00
Majority		7,051	
CPN (Maoist Centre)			

=== Election in the 2010s ===
==== 2017 legislative elections ====
Party	Candidate	Votes
CPN (Maoist Centre)	Kamala Rokka	10,434
Nepali Congress	Harishankar Gharti Magar	4,406
Naya Shakti Party, Nepal	Jitman Pun	1,489
Others		587
Result	Maoist Centre gain	
Source: Election Commission

==== 2017 Nepalese provincial elections ====
===== 1(A) =====
Party	Candidate	Votes
CPN (Maoist Centre)	Tej Bahadur Wali	5,427
Nepali Congress	Dut Kumar Pun Magar	2,144
Naya Shakti Party, Nepal	Rakhi Man Gharti	851
Rastriya Janamorcha	Anram Pun	62
Result	Maoist Centre gain	
Source: Election Commission

===== 1(B) =====
Party	Candidate	Votes
CPN (Maoist Centre)	Purna Bahadur Gharti Magar	5,816
Nepali Congress	Dutta Bahadur Basnet	3,111
Result	Maoist Centre gain	
Source: Election Commission

== See also ==
- List of parliamentary constituencies of Nepal
