= Mohan Lal Acharya =

Nepalese politician

- मोहन लाल आचार्य

Member of Parliament, Pratinidhi Sabha
- Incumbent
- Assumed office 26 March 2026
- Preceded by: Balaram Adhikari
- Constituency: Kapilvastu 1

Personal details
- Citizenship: Nepalese
- Party: Rastriya Swatantra Party
- Education: International Law (MA)
- Profession: Politician; Constitutional Lawyer

Mohan Lal Acharya (Note: Nepali: मोहन लाल आचार्य) is a Nepalese politician serving as a member of parliament from the Rastriya Swatantra Party. He is the member of the 7th Pratinidhi Sabha elected from Kapilvastu 1 constituency in 2026 Nepalese General Election securing 34,148 votes and defeating nearest contender Ashish Sharma, who contested as an independent. He is a constitutional lawyer working as a Constituent Assembly expert reviewing legislative laws for Office of the Prime Minister and Council of Ministers, Ministry of Federal Affairs, Ministry of Law, Justice and Parliamentary Affairs, Ministry of Health and Population and Ministry of Agriculture. He is also a program director at Nepal Law Society where he works as a think tank providing advisory support to the process of constitution reforms.

On 7 April 2026, Rastriya Swatantra Party nominates Acharya as a representative to the task force for the Constitutional Amendment of 2015 constitution. He holds master's degree in international law and sociology.
