= Jaypuri Gharti =

Nepali politician

Jayapuri Gharti
- जयपुरी घर्ती

Member of Parliament, Pratinidhi Sabha for CPN (Maoist Centre) party list
- Incumbent
- Assumed office 4 March 2018

Member of Constituent Assembly
- In office 28 May 2008 – 28 May 2012
- Preceded by: Lekh Nath Acharya
- Succeeded by: Krishna Bahadur Mahara
- Constituency: Rolpa 1

Personal details
- Born: 13 December 1973 (age 52)
- Party: CPN (Maoist Centre)
- Other party: CPN (Mashal)

Jaypuri Gharti (Nepali: जयपुरी घर्ती) is a Nepalese politician, Central Committee member to Communist Party of Nepal (Maoist centre). In the 2008 Constituent Assembly election she was elected from the Rolpa-1 constituency, winning 26505 votes.
