= Kapilvastu 1 =

Parliamentary constituency in Nepal

- Parliamentary constituency
- Kapilvastu 1 in Lumbini Province
- Province: Lumbini Province
- District: Kapilvastu District

Current constituency
- Created: 1991
- Party: Rastriya Swatantra Party
- Member of Parliament: Mohan Lal Acharya

Kapilvastu 1 one of three parliamentary constituencies of Kapilvastu District in Nepal. This constituency came into existence on the Constituency Delimitation Commission (CDC) report submitted on 31 August 2017.

== Incorporated areas ==
Kapilvastu 1 incorporates Suddhodhan Rural Municipality, Mayadevi Rural Municipality, Banganga Municipality and wards 8–11 of Kapilvastu Municipality.

== Assembly segments ==
It encompasses the following Lumbini Provincial Assembly segment

- Kapilvastu 1(A)
- Kapilvastu 1(B)

== Members of Parliament ==
=== Parliament/Constituent Assembly ===
Election	Member	Party
1991	Kamlesh Kumar Sharma	Nepali Congress
1999	Dan Bahadur Chaudhary	CPN (Unified Marxist–Leninist)
2008	Deep Kumar Upadhyaya	Nepali Congress
2013	Bal Ram Adhikari	CPN (Unified Marxist–Leninist)
2017	Chakrapani Khanal	CPN (Maoist Centre)
May 2018	Chakrapani Khanal	Nepal Communist Party
March 2021	Chakrapani Khanal	CPN (Maoist Centre)
2022	Balram Adhikari	CPN (Unified Marxist–Leninist)
2026	Mohan Lal Acharya	Rastriya Swatantra Party

=== Provincial Assembly ===
==== 1(A) ====
Election	Member	Party
2017	Bishnu Prasad Panthi	CPN (Unified Marxist-Leninist)
May 2018	Bishnu Prasad Panthi	Nepal Communist Party

==== 1(B) ====
Election	Member	Party
2017	Sahas Ram Yadav	Federal Socialist Forum, Nepal
May 2019	Sahas Ram Yadav	Samajbadi Party, Nepal
April 2020	Sahas Ram Yadav	People's Socialist Party, Nepal

== Election results ==
=== Election in the 2020s ===
==== 2022 general election ====
Candidate	Party	Votes	%
Balram Adhikari	CPN (UML)	34,675	40.06
Chakrapani Khanal	CPN (Maoist Centre)	18,983	21.93
Narendra Prasad Chaudhary	Janamat Party	8,396	9.70
Ram Milan Tharu	Nagrik Unmukti Party	6,075	7.02
Dhruba Bahadur Rayamajhi	Rastriya Prajatantra Party	4,341	5.02
Sanju Singh Bista	Rastriya Swatantra Party	3,376	3.90
Devendra Kumar Sharma	Hamro Nepali Party	2,508	2.90
Tapesari Kahara	Bahujan Shakti Party	2,248	2.60
Lalit Gurung	Independent	2,217	2.56
Yuvaraj Sharma Acharya	CPN (Marxist–Leninist)	1,093	1.26
Others		2,637	3.05
Total		86,549	100.00
Majority		15,692	
CPN (UML) gain			

=== Election in the 2010s ===
==== 2017 legislative elections ====
Party	Candidate	Votes
CPN (Maoist Centre)	Chakrapani Khanal	29,799
Nepali Congress	Deep Kumar Upadhyaya	28,853
Federal Socialist Forum, Nepal	Abdul Rashid Khan	11,812
Naya Shakti Party, Nepal	Dan Bahadur Kurmi	4,689
Janasamjbadi Party Nepal	Chet Narayan Upadhayay Panthi	2,346
Others		3,488
Invalid votes		4,474
Result	Maoist Centre gain	
Source: Election Commission

==== 2017 Nepalese provincial elections ====
===== 1(A) =====
Party	Candidate	Votes
CPN (Unified Marxist–Leninist)	Bishnu Prasad Panthi	25,527
Nepali Congress	Purna Prasad Chaudhary	16,683
Sanghiya Loktantrik Rastriya Manch (Tharuhat)	Dinesh Prasad Kalwar	3,958
Others		3,402
Invalid votes		1,909
Result	Maoist Centre gain	
Source: Election Commission

===== 1(B) =====
Party	Candidate	Votes
Federal Socialist Forum, Nepal	Sahas Ram Yadav	7,398
Rastriya Janata Party Nepal	Madhusudan Sharan Kurmi	6,064
CPN (Unified Marxist–Leninist)	Fazloor Rehman	4,872
Independent	Asraruddin Musalman	3,643
Nepali Congress	Rajesh Acharya	2,955
Bahujan Shakti Party	Ram Newas Harijan	1,894
Rastriya Prajatantra Party (Democratic)	Rajesh Singh	1,894
Independent	Dipendra Kumar Chaudhary	1,368
Others		1,387
Invalid votes		2,563
Result	FSFN gain	
Source: Election Commission

==== 2013 Constituent Assembly election ====
Party	Candidate	Votes
CPN (Unified Marxist–Leninist)	Bal Ram Adhikari	16,547
Nepali Congress	Deep Kumar Upadhyaya	13,526
UCPN (Maoist)	Chakrapani Khanal	5,850
Tharuhat Terai Party Nepal	Jwahar Lal Chaudhary	4,719
Others		2,944
Result	CPN (UML) gain	
Source: NepalNews

=== Election in the 2000s ===
==== 2008 Constituent Assembly election ====
Party	Candidate	Votes
Nepali Congress	Deep Kumar Upadhyaya	12,997
CPN (Unified Marxist–Leninist)	Bal Ram Adhikari	12,802
CPN (Maoist)	Chandra Bahadur Chand	11,730
Terai Madhesh Loktantrik Party	Jit Bahadur Chaudhary	3,912
CPN (Marxist–Leninist)	Bishnu Raj Aryal	1,200
Rastriya Janamorcha	Girdhari Lal Neupane	1,002
Others		3,301
Invalid votes		2,129
Result	Congress gain	
Source: Election Commission

=== Election in the 1990s ===
==== 1999 legislative elections ====
Party	Candidate	Votes
CPN (Unified Marxist–Leninist)	Dan Bahadur Chaudhary	14,494
Nepali Congress	Kamalesh Kumar Sharma	13,534
Rastriya Prajatantra Party	Dr. Guru Prasad Rajauriya	9,227
CPN (Marxist–Leninist)	Megh Raj Gyawali	3,588
Others		2,676
Invalid votes		1,175
Result	CPN (UML) gain	
Source: Election Commission

==== 1994 legislative elections ====
Party	Candidate	Votes
Nepali Congress	Kamlesh Kumar Sharma	11,558
CPN (Unified Marxist–Leninist)	Tika Ram Aryal	7,370
Independent		6,585
Nepal Sadbhavana Party	Dan Bahadur Kurmi	6,490
Rastriya Prajatantra Party	Ram Savaro Prasad Chaudhary	3,076
Others		873
Result	Congress hold	
Source: Election Commission

==== 1991 legislative elections ====
Party	Candidate	Votes
Nepali Congress	Kamlesh Kumar Sharma	13,329
CPN (Unified Marxist–Leninist)		5,591
Result	Congress gain	

== See also ==
- List of parliamentary constituencies of Nepal
