= Metmani Chaudhary =

Nepali politician

- मेटमणि चौधरी

13th Minister of Urban Development
- In office 26 June 2022 – 26 December 2022
- President: Bidya Devi Bhandari
- Prime Minister: Sher Bahadur Deuba
- Preceded by: Ram Kumari Jhakri
- Succeeded by: Sita Gurung

Member of Parliament, Pratinidhi Sabha
- Incumbent
- Assumed office 4 March 2018
- Preceded by: Parbata D.C.
- Constituency: Dang 1

Personal details
- Born: 3 March 1973 (age 53)
- Party: CPN (Unified Socialist)
- Other political affiliations: CPN (UML)

Metmani Chaudhary (Nepali: मेटमणि चौधरी) (born 3 April 1973) is a Nepali politician who is a member of Parliament in the House of Representatives elected from the Dang 1 constituency since 2018. He served as the Minister of Urban Development in the ruling coalition led by Prime Minister and Nepali Congress President Sher Bahadur Deuba. Chaudhary is a member of the newly formed CPN (Unified Socialist).
