= Bhagwan Das Gupta =

Nepali politician

- भगवान दास गुप्ता

MP

Personal details
- Born: 1 January 1940; Kapilvastu, Lumbini, Nepal
- Died: 15 November 1998 (aged 58)

Bhagwan Das Gupta (Nepali: भगवान दास गुप्ता; 1 January 1940 – 15 November 1998) was a Nepalese politician and two time Member of Parliament from Kapilvastu. His son Brijesh Kumar Gupta is also a Member of Parliament from Kapilvastu and also served as Minister of Law and Justice. He born in Agrahari Vaishya family in Kapilvastu, Nepal. His father name was Late Pashupati Sahu. Former mayor of Kapilvastu Ram Das Gupta is his brother.

== See also ==
- Winners and runners-up in the legislative elections of Nepal 1994 and 1999
- List of Agrahari people
