= Tilak Ram Sharma =

Nepali politician (born 1968)

- तिलक राम शर्मा

Minister of Internal Affairs and Communications of Lumbini Province
- Incumbent
- Assumed office 10 October 2021
- Chief minister: Kul Prasad KC
- Preceded by: Chetnath Acharya

Member of the Lumbini Provincial Assembly
- Incumbent
- Assumed office 7 December 2017
- Preceded by: Office established
- Constituency: Bardiya 1(B)

Personal details
- Born: 8 June 1968 (age 57)
- Party: Communist Party of Nepal (Maoist Centre)

Tilak Ram Sharma (Nepali: तिलक राम शर्मा; born 8 June 1968) is a Nepali politician who has served as a member of the Lumbini Provincial Assembly since 2017. A member of the Communist Party of Nepal (Maoist Centre), he represents the Bardiya 1(B) constituency. Since 2021, Sharma has also been the provincial Minister of Internal Affairs and Communications.

Sharma was elected to the provincial assembly following the 2017 Nepalese provincial elections. He defeated Nepali Congress candidate Mangal Prasad Tharu, receiving 23,392 votes compared to Tharu's 20,841.

During his tenure as minister, Sharma has spoken in favor of LGBTI rights. In June 2022, Sharma served as the leader of a three-person government body formed to investigate provincial Minister of Health Bimala Kumari Khatri, who was accused of assaulting the wife and daughter of another politician.
