= Swanam Sathi =

Nepalese politician and activist

Swanam Sathi (Nepali: स्वनाम साथी, actual name Shashi Sherchan), was a Nepali communist leader and political activist who contributed to progressive political and cultural movements in Nepal.Up to 2047 BS he was known by the name Suman.

== Biography ==
Swanam Sathi was born on Shrawan 17, 2007 BS in Darbang-2, Myagdi district, Nepal. He began his political journey by becoming a member of the communist party in 2025 BS (1968 AD).

In 2033 BS (1976 AD), he played a key role in establishing the Proletarian Communist League, which aimed to address the plight of marginalized groups and promote communist ideology in Nepal. Swanam further advanced his activism by launching the peasants' revolution in 2038 BS (1981 AD). During this time, he founded the Proletarian Workers Organization Nepal, which focused on advocating for the rights of the working class and farmers.

Over the years, Swanam was associated with several political groups, including the then CPN (Unity Centre Masal) and the Maoist Centre. However, he held no formal position in the party after the unification of Nepal’s communist parties into the Nepal Communist Party (NCP). In recent years, he had been actively working to establish a Marxist school to promote political education. He played a significant role in drafting the statute for the Maoist Party during the Hetauda General Convention, where he served as the coordinator of the Statute Drafting Committee.

In 2070 BS (2013 AD), Swanam married engineer Kiran Gautam in a ceremony held at the Maoist Centre’s office in Paris Danda.

Swanam Sathi died on Friday night, January 10, 2025, at Model Hospital in Kathmandu.

== See also ==
- Nepal Communist Party
- Proletarian Communist League
