= Chandrakesh Gupta =

Nepalese politician

Honourable Chandrakesh Gupta

Minister for Social Development of Lumbini Province
- Incumbent
- Assumed office 2022
- Constituency: Rupandehi 5(B)

Member of Lumbini Provincial Assembly

Personal details
- Party: Janamat Party

Chandrakesh Gupta is a Nepalese politician belonging to the Janamat Party. He is also a member of Lumbini Provincial Assembly for Rupandehi 5(B).
