= Top Bahadur Rayamajhi =

Nepali criminal

- टोपबहादुर रायमाझी

Minister of Energy, Water Resources and Irrigation
- In office 25 December 2020 – 20 May 2021
- President: Bidya Devi Bhandari
- Prime Minister: K. P. Sharma Oli

Secretary of the CPN (UML)
- In office 30 November 2021 – 10 May 2023

Member of Parliament, Pratinidhi Sabha
- In office 4 March 2018 – 12 September 2025
- Preceded by: Himself (as Member of the Constituent Assembly)
- Succeeded by: Hari Prasad Bhusal
- Constituency: Arghakhanchi 1

Member of the Constituent Assembly / Legislature Parliament
- In office 28 May 2008 – 14 October 2017
- Preceded by: Dilaram Acharya (as Member of Parliament)
- Succeeded by: Himself (as Member of Parliament)
- Constituency: Arghakhanchi 1

Personal details
- Born: 10 November 1961 (age 65) Arghakhanchi District, Nepal
- Party: CPN (UML)
- Other political affiliations: CPN (Maoist Centre) (1994-2021)

Top Bahadur Rayamajhi (Nepali: टोपबहादुर रायमाझी) is a Nepalese politician who has served as former Deputy Prime Minister of Nepal.Rayamajhi was a member of the 1st and 2nd Nepalese Constituent Assemblies. Rayamajhi was the secretary of CPN (UML). He is also a convicted criminal in the Bhutanese Refugees scam, sentenced to 4 years imprisonment.

== Personal life ==
He was born in Argha VDC, ward number 2 of Arghakhanchi district in year 1961.

== Political life ==
Rayamajhi assumed the post of Deputy Prime Minister and Minister for Energy in the First Oli cabinet. He is a standing committee member of Communist Party of Nepal (UML). He started his political career back in 1974.

He served as the minister for various ministries of Government of Nepal in the past years including Ministry of Physical Planning and Constructions, Ministry of Local Development, Ministry of Peace and Reconstruction.

== Bhutanese refugees scam ==
An arrest warrant was issued against former minister Rayamajhi on 3 May 2023 for his alleged connection with the racket sending off Nepali nationals to the US under the guise of Bhutanese refugees. After the arrest of former Home Minister Bal Krishna Khand, Rayamajhi was suspended from his post as Secretary of CPN(UML) on 10 May 2023. Absconding law enforcement for 11 days, he was finally arrested in Budhanilakantha, Kathmandu on 14 May 2023 despite rumors that he had fled to India. The Kathmandu District Court remanded him to three days in judicial custody for further investigation.

On 14 July 2026, Kathmandu district court sentenced Rayamajhi for 4 years imprisonment after finding him guilty on the case.

== Electoral history ==
=== 2017 legislative elections ===
Arghakhanchi-1
Party	Candidate	Votes
CPN (Maoist Centre)	Top Bahadur Rayamajhi	50,837
Nepali Congress	Dr. Ram Bahadur B.C.	32,544
Others		1,511
Result	Maoist Centre hold	
Source: Election Commission

=== 2013 Constituent Assembly election ===
Arghakhanchi-1
Party	Candidate	Votes
UCPN (Maoist)	Top Bahadur Rayamajhi	12,286
Nepali Congress	Dr. Ram Bahadur B.C.	11,234
CPN (Unified Marxist–Leninist)	Narendra Kumar Chhetri	10,240
Rastriya Janamorcha	Santa Bahadur Nepali	3,295
Others		468
Result	Maoist hold	
Source: NepalNews

=== 2008 Constituent Assembly election ===
Arghakhanchi-1
Party	Candidate	Votes
CPN (Maoist)	Top Bahadur Rayamajhi	19,584
Nepali Congress	Man Bahadur Bishwakarma	10,591
CPN (Unified Marxist–Leninist)	Chet Narayan Acharya	9,461
Rastriya Janamorcha	Dila Ram Acharya	7,575
Others		1,509
Invalid votes		1,879
Result	Maoist gain	
Source: Election Commission

== See also ==
- 2021 split in Communist Party of Nepal (Maoist Centre)
