= Sushila Chaudhary =

Nepali politician

- सुशिला चौधरी
- Incumbent
- Assumed office 2013
- Constituency: Dang-2

Personal details
- Party: Nepali Congress

Sushila Chaudhary (Nepali: सुशिला चौधरी) is a member of 2nd Nepalese Constituent Assembly. She won Dang–2 seat in 2013 Nepalese Constituent Assembly election from Nepali Congress.
