= Kamala Roka =

Nepali politician

- कमला रोका

Member of Parliament, Pratinidhi Sabha
- In office 4 March 2018 – 18 September 2022
- Preceded by: Constituency created
- Succeeded by: Purna Bahadur Gharti
- Constituency: Eastern Rukum 1

Member of Constituent Assembly for CPN (Maoist) party list
- In office 28 May 2008 – 28 May 2012

Personal details
- Born: 4 January 1976 (age 50)
- Party: CPN (Maoist Centre)
- Spouse: Ganeshman Pun
- Children: 2
- Parents: Amar Singh Roka (father); Jokhi Roka (mother)

Kamala Roka (Nepali: कमला रोका) is a Nepali communist politician, former sports minister and a member of the House of Representatives of the federal parliament of Nepal.

== Biography ==
She joined the maoist insurgency dropping out of school while a tenth grader. After the maoists joined the peace process, she went back and completed high school.

She became the Minister for Youth and Sports in the Bhattarai cabinet.

In the 2017 legislative election, she was elected from East Rukum-1 constituency under the first-past-the-post (FPTP) system, representing CPN (Maoist Centre) of the left alliance. She defeated her nearest rival Hari Shankar Gharti of Nepali Congress, acquiring 10,434 to Gharti's 4,406. She was one of only six women to be elected to parliament under the FPTP system in that election.

She was the secretariat member of Maoist Centre, and "In-charge" of the party's women department before the party merged with CPN UML to form Nepal Communist Party (NCP). Following the merger, she represents the new party in parliament, and is also the district "Co-Incharge" of the party for East Rukum.
