= Dilaram Acharya =

Nepalese politician

Member of Parliament, Pratinidhi Sabha
- In office 28 April 2006 – 16 January 2008
- Preceded by: Himself (2002)
- Succeeded by: Top Bahadur Rayamajhi (as Member of the Constituent Assembly)
- Constituency: Arghakhanchi 1
- In office 23 June 1999 – 22 May 2002
- Preceded by: Rewati Prasad Bhusal
- Succeeded by: Himself (2006)
- Constituency: Arghakhanchi 1

Personal details
- Party: Rastriya Janamorcha

Dilaram Acharya is a Nepalese politician. He was elected to the Pratinidhi Sabha in the 1999 election, as a candidate of Rashtriya Jana Morcha (the electoral front of the Communist Party of Nepal (Masal) (2006)) in the constituency of Arghakhanchi 1 with 23,452 votes.

When Janamorcha Nepal was formed in 2002 through the merger of RJM and Samyukta Janamorcha Nepal, Acharya became a member of JMN. When JMN split in 2006, Acharya sided with Communist Party of Nepal (Unity Centre-Masal) (the parent party of JMN) general secretary Mohan Bikram Singh and Chitra Bahadur K.C. in rejecting participation the Seven Party Alliance government. Effectively JMN was split. A conference of the JMN led by Chitra Bahadur K.C. was held in Butwal May 25–26, 2006, in which Acharya was elected General Secretary of this JMN faction. The Chitra Bahadur K.C./Dilaram Acharya-led JMN was renamed as the Rashtriya Jana Morcha in 2007.
