= Kul Prasad KC =

Nepali politician

Honourable Kul Prasad KC
- कुल प्रसाद केसी

Chief Minister of Lumbini Province
- In office 12 August 2021 – 12 January 2023
- Governor: Amik Sherchan
- Preceded by: Shankar Pokharel
- Succeeded by: Leela Giri

Province Assembly Member of Lumbini Province
- Incumbent
- Assumed office 2017
- Preceded by: Assembly Created
- Constituency: Rolpa 1(A)

Minister for Internal Affairs and Law of Lumbini Province
- In office 15 February 2018 – 19 April 2021
- Governor: Umakanta Jha

Personal details
- Born: January 23, 1971 (age 55) Rolpa, Lumbini Province, Nepal
- Party: Communist Party of Nepal (Maoist Centre)
- Cabinet: Kul Prasad KC cabinet
- Website: ocmcm.p5.gov.np

Kul Prasad KC (Nepali: कुल प्रसाद केसी) is a Nepalese politician and former Chief Minister of Lumbini Province, a province in western Nepal. He was unanimously selected Parliamentary Party leader of CPN(Maoist-centre) for Lumbini Province in 2018. KC was elected from Rolpa 1(A) to provincial Assembly of Lumbini province.

He is the second Chief-minister of Lumbini Province after Shankar Pokhrel resigned from the post. KC became chief minister by the support of Nepali Congress, PSP-N and Rastriya Janamorcha. KC has previously worked as Minister for Internal Affairs and Law in Shankar Pokharel Cabinet while resigned on 6 Baishakh 2078 when he was already proposed as the next Chief minister.

== See also ==
- Rajendra Kumar Rai
- Lalbabu Raut
- Rajendra Prasad Pandey
- Krishna Chandra Nepali
- Jeevan Bahadur Shahi
- Trilochan Bhatta
