= Dilli Bahadur Chaudhary =

Nepali politician

Honourable Dilli Bahadur Chaudhary
- डिल्ली बहादुर चौधरी

Chief Minister of Lumbini Province
- In office 27 April 2023 – 4 April 2024
- Governor: Amik Sherchan
- Preceded by: Lila Giri

Minister for Tourism, Rural and Urban Development of Lumbini Province
- In office 12 August 2021 – 12 January 2023
- Governor: Amik Sherchan

Province Assembly Member of Lumbini Province
- Incumbent
- Assumed office 2017
- Preceded by: Assembly Created
- Constituency: Dang 3(A)

Minister of state for Labour and Employment
- In office 2017–2018
- President: Bidya Devi Bhandari
- Prime Minister: Sher Bahadur Deuba

Member of 2nd Nepalese Constituent Assembly
- In office 2013–2017
- President: Ram Baran Yadav
- Prime Minister: Sushil Koirala
- Constituency: Party list

Personal details
- Born: Dang, Nepal
- Party: Nepali Congress
- Website: ocmcm.lumbini.gov.np

Dilli Bahadur Chaudhary (Nepali: डिल्लीबहादुर चौधरी) is a Nepali politician of Nepali Congress and Chief minister of Lumbini government. He is also serving as member of the Lumbini Province Provincial Assembly. Chaudhary was elected to the 2017 and 2022 provincial assembly elections from Dang 3(A). He has previously served as Minister for Tourism, Rural and Urban Development of Lumbini Province and as Minister of state for Labour and Employment in central government.

In addition to these, Chaudhary had made appreciable contribution through an NGO Backward Society Education. He is chairman of this organisation and has won several awards and recognitions for the same.

== Electoral history ==
=== 2022 Nepalese provincial elections ===
Dang 3(A)
Party	Candidate	Votes
Nepali Congress	Dilli Bahadur Chaudhary	19,850
CPN (UML)	Ghanshyam Pandey	14,450
Result	Congress hold	
Source: Election Commission

=== 2017 Nepalese provincial elections ===
Dang 3(A)
Party	Candidate	Votes
Nepali Congress	Dilli Bahadur Chaudhary	17,036
CPN (Maoist Centre)	Jag Prasad Sharma	14,700
Result	Congress gain	
Source: Election Commission

== Awards ==
- The Ashoka Fellowship Award, USA 1992
- The Reebok International Human RIghts Award, USA 1994
- The Antislavery International Award, UK 2002
- The Ram Krishna Jaidayal Harmony Award, India 2003
- Two Nepal Government Awards:
  - Suprabal Gorkha Dakshin Bahu Third 1994
  - Suprabal Gorkha Dakshin Bahu Trishakti Patta 2004

== See also ==
- Dilli Bahadur Chaudhary cabinet
- Kamal Bahadur Shah
- Surendra Raj Pandey

Political offices
Preceded by Leela Giri	Chief Minister of Lumbini Province; 2023-	Incumbent
