= Arghakhanchi 1 =

Parliamentary constituency in Nepal

- Parliamentary constituency
- Arghakhanchi 1 in Lumbini Province
- Province: Lumbini Province
- District: Arghakhanchi District

Current constituency
- Created: 1991
- Party: Nepal Communist Party
- Member of Parliament: Hari Prasad Bhusal (RSP)

Arghakhanchi 1 is the parliamentary constituency of Arghakhanchi District in Nepal. This constituency came into existence on the Constituency Delimitation Commission (CDC) report submitted on 31 August 2017.

== Incorporated areas ==
Arghakhanchi 1 incorporates the entirety of Arghakhanchi District.

== Assembly segments ==
It encompasses the following Lumbini Provincial Assembly segment

- Arghakhanchi 1(A)
- Arghakhanchi 1(B)

== Members of Parliament ==
=== Parliament/Constituent Assembly ===
Election	Member	Party
1991	Rewati Prasad Bhusal	Nepali Congress
1999	Dilaram Acharya	Rastriya Janamorcha
2008	Top Bahadur Rayamajhi	CPN (Maoist)
January 2009	Top Bahadur Rayamajhi	UCPN (Maoist)
May 2016	Top Bahadur Rayamajhi	CPN (Maoist Centre)
May 2018	Top Bahadur Rayamajhi	Nepal Communist Party
2022	Top Bahadur Rayamajhi	CPN (UML)
2026	Hari Prasad Bhusal	Rastriya Swatantra Party

=== Provincial Assembly ===
==== 1(A) ====
Election	Member	Party
2017	Chet Narayan Acharya	CPN (Unified Marxist-Leninist)
May 2018	Chet Narayan Acharya	Nepal Communist Party

==== 1(B) ====
Election	Member	Party
2017	Ramji Prasad Ghimire	CPN (Unified Marxist-Leninist)
May 2018	Ramji Prasad Ghimire	Nepal Communist Party

== Election results ==
=== Election in the 2020s ===
==== 2026 general election ====
Candidate	Party	Votes	%
Hari Prasad Bhusal	Rastriya Swatantra Party	35,023	42.04
Pitambar Bhusal	CPN (UML)	22,649	27.19
Bishnu Prasad Khanal	Nepali Congress	18,983	22.79
Ram Bahadur Chauhan	Nepali Communist Party	3,847	4.62
Pashupati Nath Dhakal	Rastriya Janamorcha	1,809	2.17
Others		995	1.19
Total		83,306	100.00
Majority		12,374	
Rastriya Swatantra Party gain			

==== 2022 general election ====
Candidate	Party	Votes	%
Top Bahadur Rayamajhi	CPN (UML)	42,675	48.60
Pushpa Bhusal Gautam	Nepali Congress	40,945	46.63
Hari Prasad Bhusal	Rastriya Swatantra Party	3,200	3.64
Others		989	1.13
Total		87,809	100.00
Majority		1,730	
CPN (UML) gain			

=== Election in the 2010s ===
==== 2017 legislative elections ====
Party	Candidate	Votes
CPN (Maoist Centre)	Top Bahadur Rayamajhi	50,837
Nepali Congress	Dr. Ram Bahadur B.C.	32,544
Others		1,511
Result	Maoist Centre hold	
Source: Election Commission

==== 2017 Nepalese provincial elections ====
===== 1(A) =====
Party	Candidate	Votes
CPN (Unified Marxist–Leninist)	Chet Narayan Acharya	24,751
Nepali Congress	Bishnu Prasad Khanal	14,137
Others		1,476
Invalid votes		1,455
Result	CPN (UML) gain	
Source: Election Commission

===== 1(B) =====
Party	Candidate	Votes
CPN (Unified Marxist–Leninist)	Ramji Prasad Ghimire	26,159
Nepali Congress	Himmat Bahadur Tandel (Chhetri)	17,233
Others		1,470
Invalid votes		1,790
Result	CPN (UML) gain	
Source: Election Commission

==== 2013 Constituent Assembly election ====
Party	Candidate	Votes
UCPN (Maoist)	Top Bahadur Rayamajhi	12,286
Nepali Congress	Dr. Ram Bahadur B.C.	11,234
CPN (Unified Marxist–Leninist)	Narendra Kumar Chhetri	10,240
Rastriya Janamorcha	Santa Bahadur Nepali	3,295
Others		468
Result	Maoist hold	
Source: NepalNews

=== Election in the 2000s ===
==== 2008 Constituent Assembly election ====
Party	Candidate	Votes
CPN (Maoist)	Top Bahadur Rayamajhi	19,584
Nepali Congress	Man Bahadur Bishwakarma	10,591
CPN (Unified Marxist–Leninist)	Chet Narayan Acharya	9,461
Rastriya Janamorcha	Dilaram Acharya	7,575
Others		1,509
Invalid votes		1,879
Result	Maoist gain	
Source: Election Commission

=== Election in the 1990s ===
==== 1999 legislative elections ====
Party	Candidate	Votes
Rastriya Janamorcha	Dilaram Acharya	23,452
Nepali Congress	Dr. Ram Bahadur B.C.	20,340
Others		1,312
Invalid votes		950
Result	Janamorcha gain	
Source: Election Commission

==== 1994 legislative elections ====
Party	Candidate	Votes
Nepali Congress	Rewati Prasad Bhusal	16,752
CPN (Unified Marxist–Leninist)	Guna Nidhi Bhusal	15,331
Independent	Dilaram Acharya	7,756
Rastriya Prajatantra Party	Pabitra Paudel	511
Result	Congress hold	
Source: Election Commission

==== 1991 legislative elections ====
Party	Candidate	Votes
Nepali Congress	Rewati Prasad Bhusal	16,069
CPN (Unified Marxist–Leninist)		13,367
Result	Congress gain	

== See also ==
- List of parliamentary constituencies of Nepal
