= Birendra Kumar Kanodia =

Nepali politician

Honourable Birendra Kumar Kanodia
- बिरेन्द्र कुमार कनोडिया

Province Assembly Member of Lumbini Province
- Incumbent
- Assumed office 2017
- Preceded by: Constituency Created
- Constituency: Kapilvastu 3(B)

Assistant Minister for Water Resources
- In office 2001–2002
- Monarch: Gyanendra of Nepal
- Prime Minister: Sher Bahadur Deuba

Member of House of Representatives
- In office 1999–2002
- Constituency: Kapilvastu 3

Personal details
- Born: Kapilvastu, Lumbini Province, Nepal
- Party: Nepali Congress

Birendra Kumar Kanodia is a Nepalese politician and member of the Lumbini Provincial Assembly. He was elected as parliamentary party leader. He is the current leader of the opposition of Lumbini Province.

== Political career ==
He was elected to the Pratinidhi Sabha in the 1999 election on behalf of the Nepali Congress. In 2001 he was appointed as Assistant Minister for Water Resources in Sher Bahadur Deuba's expanded cabinet. Recently he was elected in a provincial election as a MLA from Kapilvastu constituency 3 sub-constituency 2.

== Electoral history ==
=== 2017 Nepalese provincial elections ===
Kapilvastu 3 (B)
Party	Candidate	Votes
Nepali Congress	Birendra Kumar Kanudiya	6,679
CPN (Maoist Centre)	Javed Alam Khan	6,307
Independent	Janaki Prasad Yadav	5,157
Federal Socialist Forum, Nepal	Shailesh Pratap Shah	3,317
Rastriya Janata Party Nepal	Ram Prakash Kurmi	3,172
Bahujan Shakti Party	Gauri Shankar Harijan	1,970
Others		1,727
Invalid votes		2,637
Result	Congress gain	
Source: Election Commission

=== 1999 legislative elections ===
Kapilvastu 3
Party	Candidate	Votes
Nepali Congress	Birendra Kumar Kanudiya	12,261
Independent	Surendra Raj Acharya	8,759
Rastriya Prajatantra Party (Chand)	Hari Narayan Rajauriya	7,927
Rastriya Prajatantra Party	Akbal Ahmed Sah	6,418
CPN (Unified Marxist–Leninist)	Bal Ram Adhikari	5,663
Nepal Sadbhavana Party	Amrita Devi Agrahari	2,891
Others		1,342
Invalid votes		1,384
Result	Congress hold	
Source: Election Commission
