= Santosh Kumar Pandeya =

Nepalese politician

Honourable Santosh Kumar Pandeya
- सन्तोष कुमार पाण्डेय

Member of Lumbini Provincial Assembly
- Incumbent
- Assumed office 2017
- Constituency: Rupandehi 3(A)

Personal details
- Party: Loktantrik Samajwadi Party, Nepal

Santosh Kumar Pandeya (Nepali: सन्तोष कुमार पाण्डेय) is a Nepalese politician belonging to the Loktantrik Samajwadi Party, Nepal. He is also a member of Lumbini Provincial Assembly for Rupandehi 3(A).

Pandeya who is parliamentary party leader of the party in provincial assembly has also served briefly as minister for Physical Infrastructure Development of Lumbini Province.
