= Dip Kumar Upadhaya =

Nepali politician

Dip Kumar Upadhaya (Nepali: दीप कुमार उपाध्याय) is a Nepalese Politician of Nepali Congress, and former Minister for Culture, Tourism, and Civil Aviation. He is former ambassador of Nepal for India. He resigned from the post and returned to compete in election of House of Representative in 2074.

In the 2008 Constituent Assembly election he was elected from the Kapilvastu-1 constituency, winning 12997 votes.
