= Rolpa 1 =

Parliamentary constituency in Nepal

- Parliamentary constituency
- Rolpa 1 in Lumbini Province
- Province: Lumbini Province
- District: Rolpa District

Current constituency
- Created: 1991
- Party: Nepali Communist Party
- Member of Parliament: Barsaman Pun

Rolpa 1 is the parliamentary constituency of Rolpa District in Nepal. This constituency came into existence on the Constituency Delimitation Commission (CDC) report submitted on 31 August 2017.

== Incorporated areas ==
Rolpa 1 incorporates the entirety of Rolpa District.

== Assembly segments ==
It encompasses the following Lumbini Provincial Assembly segment

- Rolpa 1(A)
- Rolpa 1(B)

== Members of Parliament ==
=== Parliament/Constituent Assembly ===
Election	Member	Party
1991	Barman Budha	Samyukta Janamorcha Nepal
1994	Bala Ram Gharti Magar	Rastriya Prajatantra Party
1999	Lekh Nath Acharya	Nepali Congress
2008	Jayapuri Gharti	CPN (Maoist)
January 2009	Jayapuri Gharti	UCPN (Maoist)
2013	Krishna Bahadur Mahara	UCPN (Maoist)
May 2016	Krishna Bahadur Mahara	CPN (Maoist Centre)
2017	Barsaman Pun	CPN (Maoist Centre)
May 2018	Barsaman Pun	Nepal Communist Party
March 2021	Barsaman Pun	CPN (Maoist Centre)
2026	Barsaman Pun	Nepali Communist Party

=== Provincial Assembly ===
==== 1(A) ====
Election	Member	Party
2017	Kul Prasad K.C.	CPN (Maoist Centre)
May 2018	Kul Prasad K.C.	Nepal Communist Party

==== 1(B) ====
Election	Member	Party
2017	Dipendra Kumar Pun Magar	CPN (Maoist Centre)
May 2018	Dipendra Kumar Pun Magar	Nepal Communist Party

== Election results ==
=== Election in the 2020s ===
==== 2022 general election ====
Candidate	Party	Votes	%
Barsaman Pun	CPN (Maoist Centre)	41,714	67.60
Purna Budha Magar	CPN (UML)	16,485	26.71
Lila Rawal	Rastriya Prajatantra Party	2,556	4.14
Others		955	1.55
Total		61,710	100.00
Majority		25,229	
CPN (Maoist Centre) hold			

=== Election in the 2010s ===
==== 2017 legislative elections ====
Party	Candidate	Votes
CPN (Maoist Centre)	Barsaman Pun	42,084
Nepali Congress	Amar Singh Pun	20,337
Unified Rastriya Prajatantra Party (Nationalist)	Ram Bahadur Wali Chhettri	1,191
Others		1,684
Invalid votes		5,373
Result	Maoist Centre hold	
Source: Election Commission

==== 2017 Nepalese provincial elections ====
===== 1(A) =====
Party	Candidate	Votes
CPN (Maoist Centre)	Kul Prasad K.C.	18,512
Nepali Congress	Sher Bahadur Mahara	10,401
Others		2,135
Invalid votes		2,888
Result	Maoist Centre gain	
Source: Election Commission

===== 1(B) =====
Party	Candidate	Votes
CPN (Maoist Centre)	Dipendra Kumar Pun Magar	24,490
Nepali Congress	Khagendra Prakash Hamal	9,939
Others		908
Invalid votes		1,892
Result	Maoist Centre gain	
Source: Election Commission

==== 2013 Constituent Assembly election ====
Party	Candidate	Votes
UCPN (Maoist)	Krishna Bahadur Mahara	11,407
Nepali Congress	Lekh Nath Acharya	8,409
Rastriya Prajatantra Party	Balaram Gharti Magar	3,150
CPN (Unified Marxist–Leninist)	Hit Bahadur Roka Magar	1,478
CPN (Marxist–Leninist)	Keshav Raj Khadka	1,244
Others		1,087
Result	Maoist hold	
Source: NepalNews

=== Election in the 2000s ===
==== 2008 Constituent Assembly election ====
Party	Candidate	Votes
CPN (Maoist)	Jayapuri Gharti	26,505
Nepali Congress	Madhav Prasad Acharya	4,946
Rastriya Prajatantra Party	Ammar Bahadur Thapa	2,506
CPN (Unified Marxist–Leninist)	Prithvi Prasad Roka	2,170
Others		2,314
Invalid votes		1,916
Result	Maoist gain	
Source: Election Commission

=== Election in the 1990s ===
==== 1999 legislative elections ====
Party	Candidate	Votes
Nepali Congress	Lekh Nath Acharya	6,695
Rastriya Prajatantra Party	Bhup Narayan Gharti Magar	5,225
Independent	Reg Bahadur Subedi	2,369
CPN (Unified Marxist–Leninist)	Purna Bahadur Oli	1,797
Others		1,249
Invalid votes		922
Result	Congress gain	
Source: Election Commission

==== 1994 legislative elections ====
Party	Candidate	Votes
Rastriya Prajatantra Party	Balaram Gharti Magar	9,523
Nepali Congress	Amrit Bahadur Gharti	8,328
CPN (Unified Marxist–Leninist)	Tika Ram Khadka	1,739
Independent	Raj Kumar Kakshapati	
Result	RPP gain	
Source: Election Commission

==== 1991 legislative elections ====
Party	Candidate	Votes
Samyukta Janamorcha Nepal	Barman Budha	9,656
Rastriya Prajatantra Party (Thapa)	Balaram Gharti Magar	7,771
Result	SMJN gain	

== See also ==
- List of parliamentary constituencies of Nepal
