= Amik Sherchan =

Nepali politician

Honourable Amik Sherchan
- अमिक शेरचन

3rd Governor of Lumbini Province
- In office 27 July 2021 – 31 July 2024
- President: Bidhya Devi Bhandari
- Prime Minister: Sher Bahadur Deuba; Pushpa Kamal Dahal; Khadga Prasad Sharma Oli
- Chief Minister: Shankar Pokharel; Kul Prasad KC; Leela Giri; Dilli Bahadur Chaudhary; Jokh Bahadur Mahara; Chet Narayan Acharya
- Preceded by: Dharmanath Yadav
- Succeeded by: Krishna Bahadur Gharti Magar

2nd Governor of Gandaki Province
- In office 5 November 2019 – 3 May 2021
- President: Bidhya Devi Bhandari
- Prime Minister: Khadga Prasad Sharma Oli
- Chief Minister: Prithvi Subba Gurung
- Preceded by: Baburam Kunwar
- Succeeded by: Sita Kumari Poudel

Deputy Prime Minister of Nepal
- In office 11 June 2006 – April 2007 Serving with Khadga Prasad Sharma Oli
- Monarch: King Gyanendra
- Prime Minister: Girija Prasad Koirala
- Preceded by: Tulsi Giri (Note: As Vice Chairman of the Council of Ministers); Kirti Nidhi Bista
- Succeeded by: Ram Chandra Poudel

Minister of Health and Population of Nepal
- In office 11 June 2006 – April 2007
- Monarch: King Gyanendra
- Prime Minister: Girija Prasad Koirala
- Preceded by: Kirti Nidhi Bista (Note: As Vice Chairman and Minister of Health and Population)
- Succeeded by: Giriraj Mani Pokharel

Member of the Parliament, Pratinidhi Sabha
- In office 1991–1999
- Preceded by: Constituency established
- Succeeded by: Dr. Gangadhar Lamsal
- Constituency: Chitwan 3

Member of the Constituent Assembly / Legislature Parliament
- In office 28 May 2008 – 28 May 2012
- Preceded by: Constituency established
- Succeeded by: Bikram Pandey
- Constituency: Chitwan 5

Personal details
- Born: 1944 Okharbot, Myagdi, Nepal
- Parent(s): Badi Bahadur Sherchan (father); Umadevi Sherchan (mother)
- Education: I.A.

Amik Sherchan (born 1944) is a Nepalese politician and former Governor of Lumbini Province of Nepal. He is former chairman of Janamorcha Nepal. He served as the Deputy Prime Minister and Minister of Health and Population of Nepal in the interim government under Girija Prasad Koirala cabinet. He also served as the 2nd Governor of Gandaki Province of Nepal. He is active as a politician and prominent leader since 1967. He was elected as a member of the Pratinidhi Sabha (1991 - 1994) and Member of 1st Constituent Assembly (2008 - 2012) from Chitwan.

== Personal life ==
Sherchan was born in Okharbotkhani, Myagdi District, to Badi Bahadur Sherchan and Umadevi Sherchan. He completed his undergraduate degree in political science.

== See also ==
- Shashi Sherchan

== Notes ==
Political offices
Preceded by Baburam Kunwar	Governor of Gandaki Province; 5 November 2019 – present	Incumbent
