= Indrajit Tharu =

Nepalese politician

Indrajit Tharu (Nepali: इन्द्रजीत थारु) is a Nepalese politician, belonging to the Communist Party of Nepal (Maoist). In January 2007 he was nominated to the interim legislature of Nepal on behalf of the CPN (Maoist). In April 2008, he won the Dang-1 seat in the Constituent Assembly election, defeating veteran Nepali Congress politician Khum Bahadur Khadka. Tharu received 18,903 votes in this election.
