= Shankar Pokharel =

Nepali politician

Shankar Pokhrel
- शंकर पोख्रेल

Chief Minister of Lumbini Province
- In office 15 February 2018 – 11 August 2021
- Governor: Uma Kant Jha; Dharmanath Yadav; Amik Sherchan
- Succeeded by: Kul Prasad KC

Minister of Information and Communications
- In office 25 May 2009 – 6 February 2011
- President: Ram Baran Yadav
- Prime Minister: Madhav Kumar Nepal

Member of Lumbini Provincial Assembly
- Incumbent
- Assumed office 2017
- Constituency: Dang Provincial Assembly 2(A)

Personal details
- Born: 27 February 1963 (age 63) Tulsipur, Dang
- Party: Communist Party of Nepal (CPN)- Unified Marxist Leninist (UML)
- Spouse: Sujita Shakya
- Parents: Keshav Raj Sharma (father); Tilka Devi (mother)

Shankar Pokhrel (Nepali: शंकर पोखरेल) (born 1964) is the former Chief Minister of Lumbini Province. He was elected as the central secretary of Communist Party of Nepal (Unified Marxist–Leninist) from 1998 to 2008.
