= Lumbini provincial assembly =

Unicameral body, 60 MPs, Dang capital

Lumbini Provincial Assembly लुम्बिनी प्रदेश सभा
- 2nd Lumbini Provincial Assembly

Type
- Type: Unicameral legislature of Lumbini Province

History
- Founded: 2018

Leadership
- Speaker: Tularam Gharti Magar, NCP since 18 January 2023
- Deputy Speaker: Menuka Khand K.C., RPP since 18 January 2023
- Leader of the House: Chet Narayan Acharya, CPN (UML) since 23 July 2024
- Leader of Opposition: Dilli Bahadur Chaudhary, NC since 28 July 2026

Structure
- Political groups: Government (50): CPN (UML): 29; NCP: 16; LSPN: 3; PSP: 2; Confidence & Supply (2): PSP-N: 1; Janamorcha: 1; Opposition (35): Congress: 27; RPP: 4; Janamat: 3; Independent: 1
- Length of term: 5 years

Elections
- Voting system: Parallel voting: 52 seats – FPtP; 35 seats – PR
- First election: 2017
- Last election: 20 November 2022
- Next election: 2027

Meeting place
- Chamber of Commerce Meeting Hall, Bhalubang, Dang District

Website
- pradeshsabha.p5.gov.np

Constitution
- Constitution of Nepal

The Provincial Assembly of Lumbini Province also known as the Lumbini Pradesh Sabha (Nepali: लुम्बिनी प्रदेश सभा) is a unicameral governing and law making body of Lumbini Province, one of the 7 provinces in Nepal, and is situated at Dang, the interim province capital of Lumbini Province, with 60 Members of the Provincial Assembly (MPA).

The First Provincial Assembly was constituted in 2017, after the 2017 provincial elections. The current assembly was elected in November 2022.

== List of assemblies ==
Election Year	Assembly	Start of term	End of term	Speaker	Chief Minister	Party
2017	1st Assembly	4 February 2018	September 2022	Purna Bahadur Gharti	Shankar Pokharel (Cabinet)	CPN (UML)
2017	1st Assembly	4 February 2018	September 2022	Purna Bahadur Gharti	Kul Prasad KC (Cabinet)	CPN (Maoist Centre)
2022	2nd Assembly	2 January 2023	Incumbent	Tularam Gharti Magar	Leela Giri (Cabinet)	CPN (UML)
2022	2nd Assembly	2 January 2023	Incumbent	Tularam Gharti Magar	Dilli Bahadur Chaudhary (Cabinet)	Nepali Congress
2022	2nd Assembly	2 January 2023	Incumbent	Tularam Gharti Magar	Jokh Bahdur Mahara (Cabinet)	CPN (Maoist Centre)
2022	2nd Assembly	2 January 2023	Incumbent	Tularam Gharti Magar	Chet Narayan Acharya (Cabinet)	CPN (UML)

== Current composition ==
Party	Parliamentary party leader	Seats
CPN (UML)	Chet Narayan Acharya	29
Nepali Congress	Dilli Bahadur Chaudhary	27
Nepali Communist Party	Jokh Bahadur Mahara	12
Nagrik Unmukti Party	Dharma Bahadur Chaudhary	4
Rastriya Prajatantra Party	Ashish Kumar Chaudhary	4
Loktantrik Samajwadi Party	Santosh Kumar Pandey	3
Janamat Party	Chandrakesh Gupta	3
People's Socialist Party	Bhandari Lal Ahir	3
Rastriya Janamorcha	Tara Thapa	1
Independent		2
Total		87

== See also ==
- Lumbini Province
- Provincial assemblies of Nepal
