= Dhanauri =

Village Development Committee in Lumbini Province, Nepal

Dhanauri धनौरी
- Village Development Committee
- Location in Nepal
- Coordinates: 28.13°N 82.15°E
- Country: Nepal
- Province: Lumbini Province
- District: Dang Deokhuri District

Population (1991)
  - Total: 12,403
- Time zone: UTC+5:45 (Nepal Time)

Dhanauri is a town and Village Development Committee in Dang Deokhuri District in Lumbini Province of south-western Nepal. At the time of the 1991 Nepal census it had a population of 12,403 persons living in 1905 individual households.
