= Syuja =

Syuja स्युजा
- Village Development Committee
- Location in Nepal
- Coordinates: 28.06°N 82.61°E
- Country: Nepal
- Province: Lumbini Province
- District: Dang Deokhuri District

Population (1991)
  - Total: 4,137
- Time zone: UTC+5:45 (Nepal Time)

Syuja is a town and Village Development Committee in Dang Deokhuri District in Lumbini Province of south-western Nepal. At the time of the 1991 Nepal census it had a population of 4,137 persons living in 781 individual households.
