= Maladera raptiensis =

Scientific classification
- Kingdom: Animalia
- Phylum: Arthropoda
- Class: Insecta
- Order: Coleoptera
- Suborder: Polyphaga
- Infraorder: Scarabaeiformia
- Family: Scarabaeidae
- Genus: Maladera
- Species: M. raptiensis

Binomial name
- Maladera raptiensis Ahrens, 2004

Species of beetle

Maladera raptiensis is a species of beetle of the family Scarabaeidae. It is found in India (Uttarakhand), Nepal and Myanmar.

== Description ==
Adults reach a length of about 5.7–7.1 mm. The head and pronotum sometimes have a faint greenish shine. The upper surface is dull matte and glabrous, except for a few setae on the head and the lateral cilia of the pronotum and elytra.

== Etymology ==
The species name is derived from its type locality, Monahari Khola in the Rapti valley.
