= Dharna, Nepal =

Dharna, Nepal धार्ना
- Village Development Committee
- Location in Nepal
- Coordinates: 27.97°N 82.40°E
- Country: Nepal
- Province: Lumbini Province
- District: Dang Deokhuri District

Population (2001)
  - Total: 6,396
- Time zone: UTC+5:45 (Nepal Time)

Dharna is a town and Village Development Committee in Dang Deokhuri District in Lumbini Province of south-western Nepal. At the time of the 2001 Nepal census it had a population of 6,396 persons living in 961 individual households.
