= Rapti =

Rapti may refer to:

- Rapti, Dang, a rural municipality in Dang district, Province no.5, Nepal
- Rapti Municipality, a municipality in Narayani zone of Nepal
- Rapti Zone, in Nepal, a first order administrative district west of Kathmandu
- West Rapti River, a river rising in Rapti Zone
- East Rapti River, a small river draining the Chitwan valley in Nepal
