= Hapur, Nepal =

Hapur, Nepal हापुरे
- Village Development Committee
- Location in Nepal
- Coordinates: 28.11°N 82.44°E
- Country: Nepal
- Province: Lumbini Province
- District: Dang Deokhuri District

Population (1991)
  - Total: 10,424
- Time zone: UTC+5:45 (Nepal Time)

Hapur is a town and Village Development Committee in Dang Deokhuri District in Lumbini Province of south-western Nepal. At the time of the 1991 Nepal census it had a population of 10,424 persons living in 1788 individual households.
