= Loharpani =

Loharpani लोहारपानी
- Village Development Committee
- Location in Nepal
- Coordinates: 28.00°N 82.69°E
- Country: Nepal
- Province: Lumbini Province
- District: Dang Deokhuri District

Population (1991)
  - Total: 4,789
- Time zone: UTC+5:45 (Nepal Time)

Loharpani is a town and village development dommittee in Dang Deokhuri District in Lumbini Province of south-western Nepal. At the time of the 1991 Nepal census it had a population of 4,789 persons living in 811 individual households.
