= Diruwa =

Duruwa दिरुवा
- Village Development Committee
- Country: Nepal
- Province: Lumbini Province
- District: Dang Deokhuri District

Population (1991)
  - Total: 9,721
- Time zone: UTC+5:45 (Nepal Time)

Diruwa is a town and Village Development Committee in Dang Deokhuri District in Lumbini Province of south-western Nepal. At the time of the 1991 Nepal census it had a population of 9,721 persons living in 1408 individual households.
