= Lalmitiya =

Coordinates: 27°53′N 82°47′E

Lalmatiya (alt. Lalmitiya) लालमाटिया
- Village Development Committee
- Interactive map of Lalmatiya (alt. Lalmitiya)
- Country: Nepal
- Province: Lumbini Province
- District: Dang District

Population (1991)
  - Total: 12,048
- Time zone: UTC+5:45 (Nepal Time)

Lalmatiya is a town and Village Development Committee in Dang District in Lumbini Province of south-western Nepal. At the time of the 1991 Nepal census it had a population of 12,048 persons living in 1900 individual households.

It includes Bhalubang, a bazaar situated at the Terai/Hill interface and now a junction on the east-west Mahendra Highway where branch roads served by scheduled buses go to Pyuthan and Rolpa districts.
