= Saudiyar =

Saudiyar सौडियार
- Village Development Committee
- Location in Nepal
- Coordinates: 28.02°N 82.42°E
- Country: Nepal
- Province: Lumbini Province
- District: Dang District

Population (1991)
  - Total: 8,052
- Time zone: UTC+5:45 (Nepal Time)

Saudiyar is a town and Village Development Committee in Dang District in Lumbini Province of south-western Nepal. At the time of the 1991 Nepal census it had a population of 8,052 persons living in 1067 individual households.

According to the 2011 census of Nepal, the population of the Saudiyar Village Development Committee is 12101 of which male are 5547 and female are 6554. The total population lives in 2453 households. The VDC is predominantly populated by the Tharu ethnic groups followed by Chhetri, Brahmin, Magar and other dalit castes.
