= Panchakule =

Panchakule पञ्चकुले
- Village Development Committee
- Location in Nepal
- Coordinates: 28.13°N 82.07°E
- Country: Nepal
- Province: Lumbini Province
- District: Dang Deokhuri District

Population (1991)
  - Total: 6,270
- Time zone: UTC+5:45 (Nepal Time)

Panchakule is a town and Village Development Committee in Dang Deokhuri District in Lumbini Province of south-western Nepal. At the time of the 1991 Nepal census it had a population of 6,270 persons living in 1019 individual households.
