= Sisahaniya =

Sisahaniya may refer to:

- Sisahaniya, Bara District, Nepal
- Sisahaniya, Dang District, Nepal
