= Kabhre =

Coordinates: 27°59′N 82°37′E

Kavre काभ्रे
- Village Development Committee
- Interactive map of Kavre
- Country: Nepal
- Province: Lumbini Province
- District: Dang Deokhuri District

Population (1991)
  - Total: 6,033
- Time zone: UTC+5:45 (Nepal Time)

Kavre is a town and village development committee in Dang Deokhuri District in Lumbini Province of south-western Nepal. At the time of the 1991 Nepal census it had a population of 6,033 persons residing in 1142 individual households.
