= Buddhiram Bhandari =

Nepali politician

- बुद्धिराम भण्डारी
- Incumbent
- Assumed office 2013
- Constituency: Dang-4

Personal details
- Party: Nepali Congress

Buddhiram Bhandari (Nepali: बुद्धिराम भण्डारी) is a member of 2nd Nepalese Constituent Assembly. He won Dang–4 seat in 2013 Nepalese Constituent Assembly election from Nepali Congress.
