= Sisahaniya, Dang District =

Sisahaniya, Rapti सिसहनिया
- Village Development Committee
- Location in Nepal
- Coordinates: 27.87°N 82.66°E
- Country: Nepal
- Province: Lumbini Province
- District: Dang Deokhuri District

Population (1991)
  - Total: 11,972
- Time zone: UTC+5:45 (Nepal Time)

Sisahaniya is a town and Village Development Committee in Dang Deokhuri District in Lumbini Province of south-western Nepal. At the time of the 1991 Nepal census it had a population of 11,972 persons living in 1530 individual households.
