= Amar Giri =

Nepalese poet

Amar Giri (अमर गिरी)
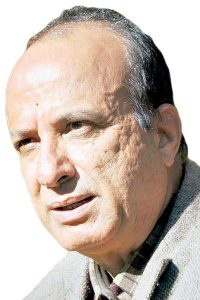
- Born: September 11, 1960 (age 65); Nimuria, Dang, Nepal
- Occupations: Writer, poet
- Years active: 1974
- Parents: Basudev Giri (father); Lilawati Giri (mother)

Amar Giri (Nepali: अमर गिरी) is a Nepalese poet.

== Biography ==
As the first son of mother Lilavati Giri and father Vasudev Giri, he was born on 11 September 1960 in Nimuria 2, Ghorahi Sub-Metropolitan City, and currently resides in Ratanpur-15, Ghorahi Sub-Metropolitan City, Dang. Giri's childhood was spent in that rural environment.

His first poem was "Being Like Ho Chi Minh", which he wrote when he was in class 7. His first published poem was "Aama" (1974), which was published in Sandesh, a newspaper in Banaras. His first published book was Gham Chekne Pahad (Kavitasangraha, 1998).

He has served as a member of the academic council of Nepal Pragya Pratishthan, head of the poetry department, executive chairman of the film development board and president of the Progressive Writers Association. He is currently a member of the Language Commission.

== Published works ==
- Gham Chekene Pahad (Anthology of Poems, 1998)
- Yet We Live (Anthology, 2004)
- Sad Time (Anthology, 2007)
- Between Words (Anthology, 2014)
- Time Dialogue (Anthology of Poems, 2016)
- Time, Society and Culture (Works on Literary and Cultural Thought, 2010)
- Ideological Perspective of Contemporary Nepali Poetry (Criticism, 2016)
- Globalization and Literature (Review, 2017)
- Poetry Discussion (2015, 2016, 2017, edit)
- Literature Discussion (Criticism, 2018)
- Class Conflict in Poetry (Criticism, 2018)
- Pragya Contemporary Nepali Poetry Discussion (Co-edited)
- Poems of the Nepali Diaspora (co-edited)
- Craft of Contemporary Nepali Poetry (Co-edited)
