= Banglachuli Rural Municipality =

Banglachuli Rural Municipality वंगलाचुली गाउँपालिका
- Gaunpalika
- Location in Nepal
- Coordinates: 28.008819°N 82.628145°E
- Country: Nepal
- Province: Lumbini Province
- District: Dang District

Area
  - Total: 245 km^{2} (95 sq mi)

Population (2011)
  - Total: 24,245
  - Density: 99.0/km^{2} (256/sq mi)
- Time zone: UTC+5:45 (Nepal Time)
- Website: http://bangalachulimun.gov.np

Banglachuli Rural Municipality (Nepali: वंगलाचुली गाउँपालिका) is a Gaunpalika in Dang District in Lumbini Province of Nepal. On 12 March 2017, the government of Nepal implemented a new local administrative structure, replacing VDCs (Village Development Committees) with municipal and Village Councils. Banglachuli is one of these 753 local units.

== Demographics ==
At the time of the 2011 Nepal census, Banglachuli Rural Municipality had a population of 24,245. Of these, 97.0% spoke Nepali, 2.8% Kham and 0.1% Magar.

In terms of ethnicity/caste, 42.9% were Magar, 29.3% Chhetri, 10.6% Kami, 5.2% Sarki, 4.9% Hill Brahmin, 3.1% Damai/Dholi, 1.4% other Dalit, 1.3% Sanyasi/Dasnami, 0.9% Thakuri, 0.1% Sunuwar and 0.3% others.

In terms of religion, 95.1% were Hindu, 4.0% Buddhist and 0.8% Christian.

In terms of literacy, 59.0% could read and write, 2.8% could only read and 38.1% could neither read nor write.
