= Kulpani Mandir =

Chennai Ambattur

- ॐ कुलपानी मन्दिर
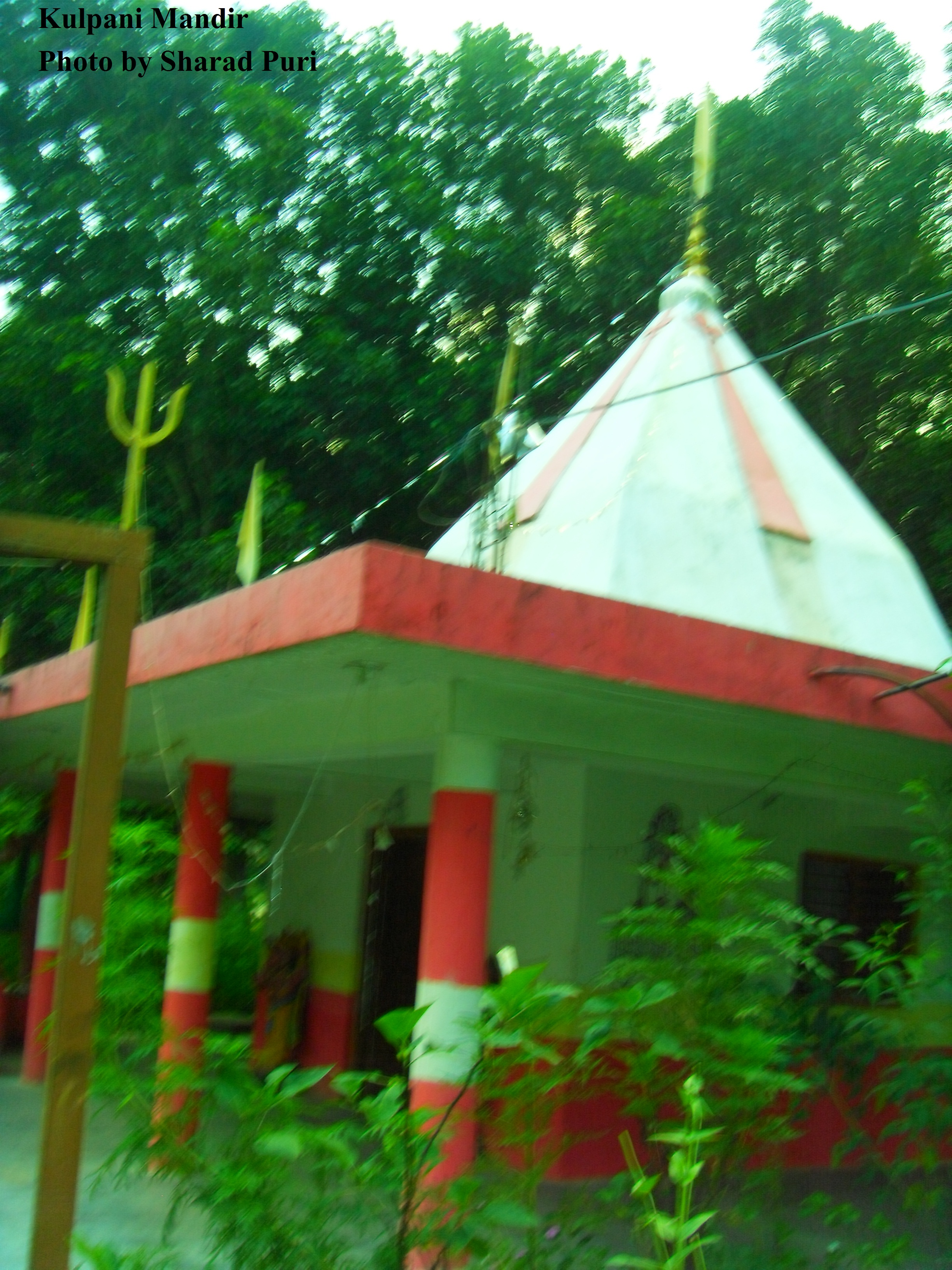

- Location within Nepal

Religion
- Affiliation: Hinduism
- District: Dang
- Province: Lumbini Province

Location
- Location: Gadhawa Rural Municipality ward no.1
- Country: Nepal
- Interactive map of Kulpani Mandir
- Coordinates: 27.807071°N 82.709862°E

Architecture
- Type: Pagoda

Kulpani Mandir॥ॐ॥कुलपानी मन्दिर is a Shiva temple located in Gadhawa Rural Municipality ward no. 1, Badahara Dang Deukhuri District Nepal.

== Kulpani park ==
Kulpani park; a recreational area within Kulpani temple territory, is being developing as an eco-tourism area with the help of local government and Kulpani community forest consumer committee; a committee of local people for sustainable forest management that ensures demand of wood for local people and also works for poverty elimination, personal development and ability enhancement.

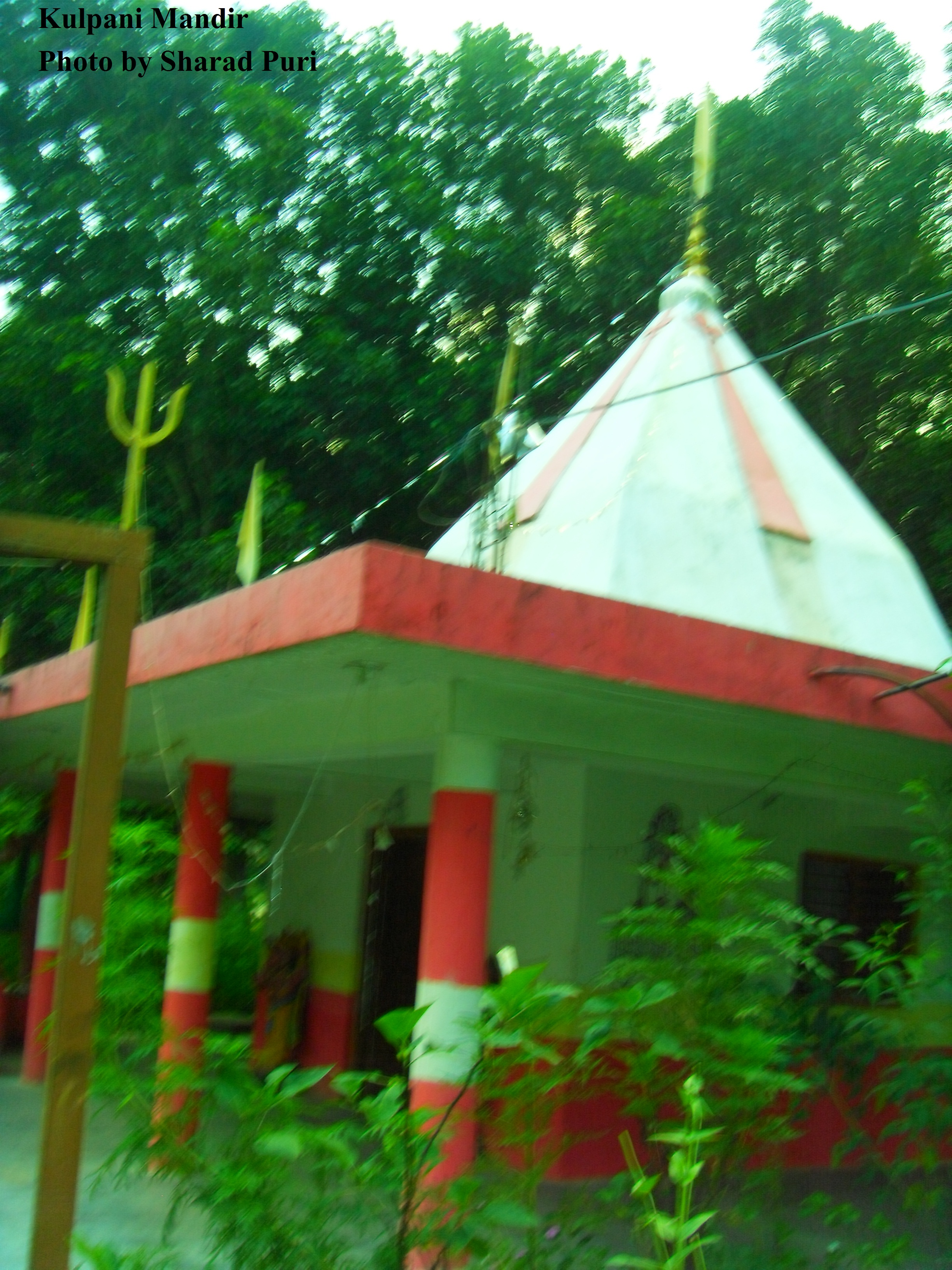
Kulpani Mandir

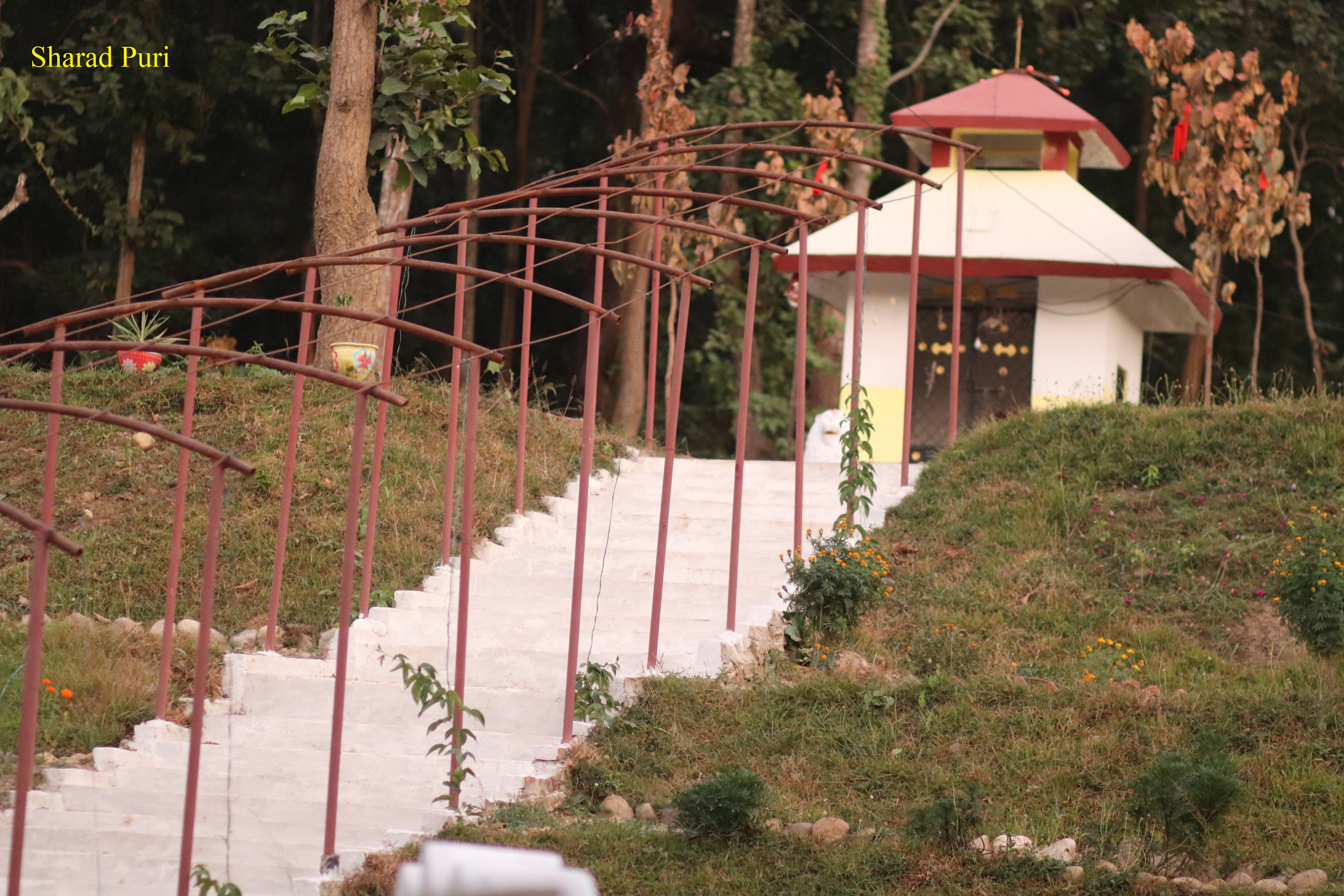
New Temple in Kulpani Park

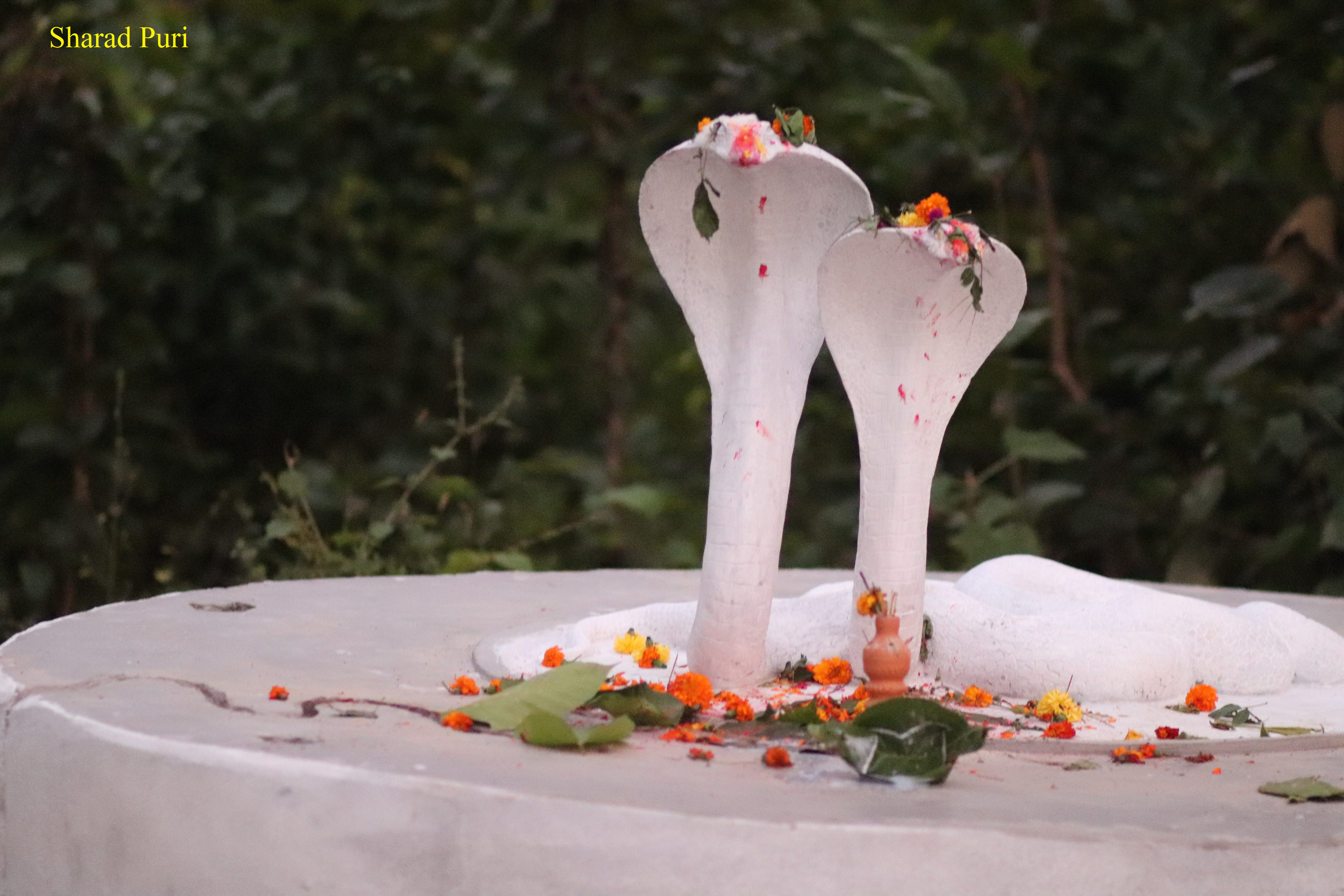
Sculpture of King Cobra

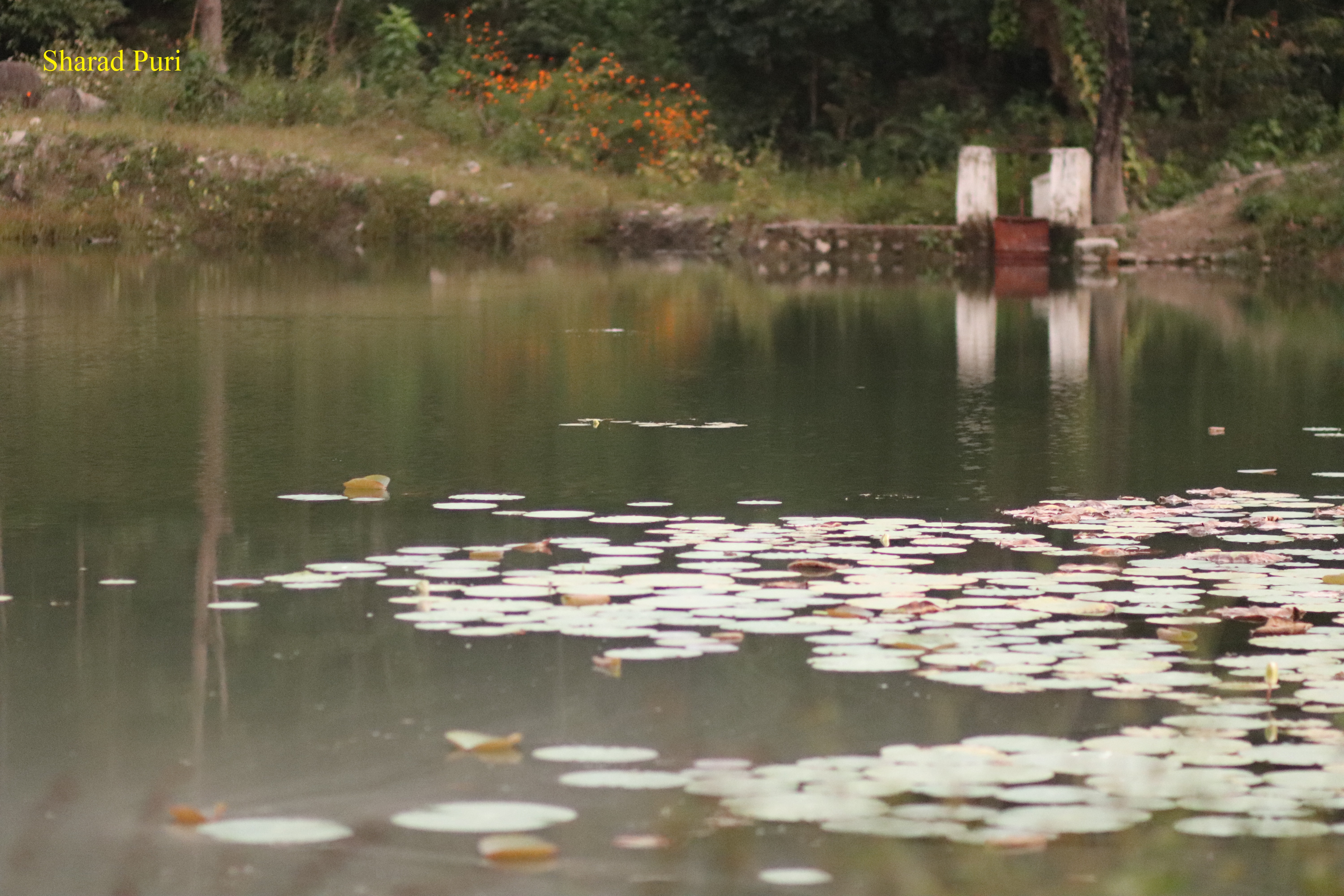
Inlet of Kulpani Pond

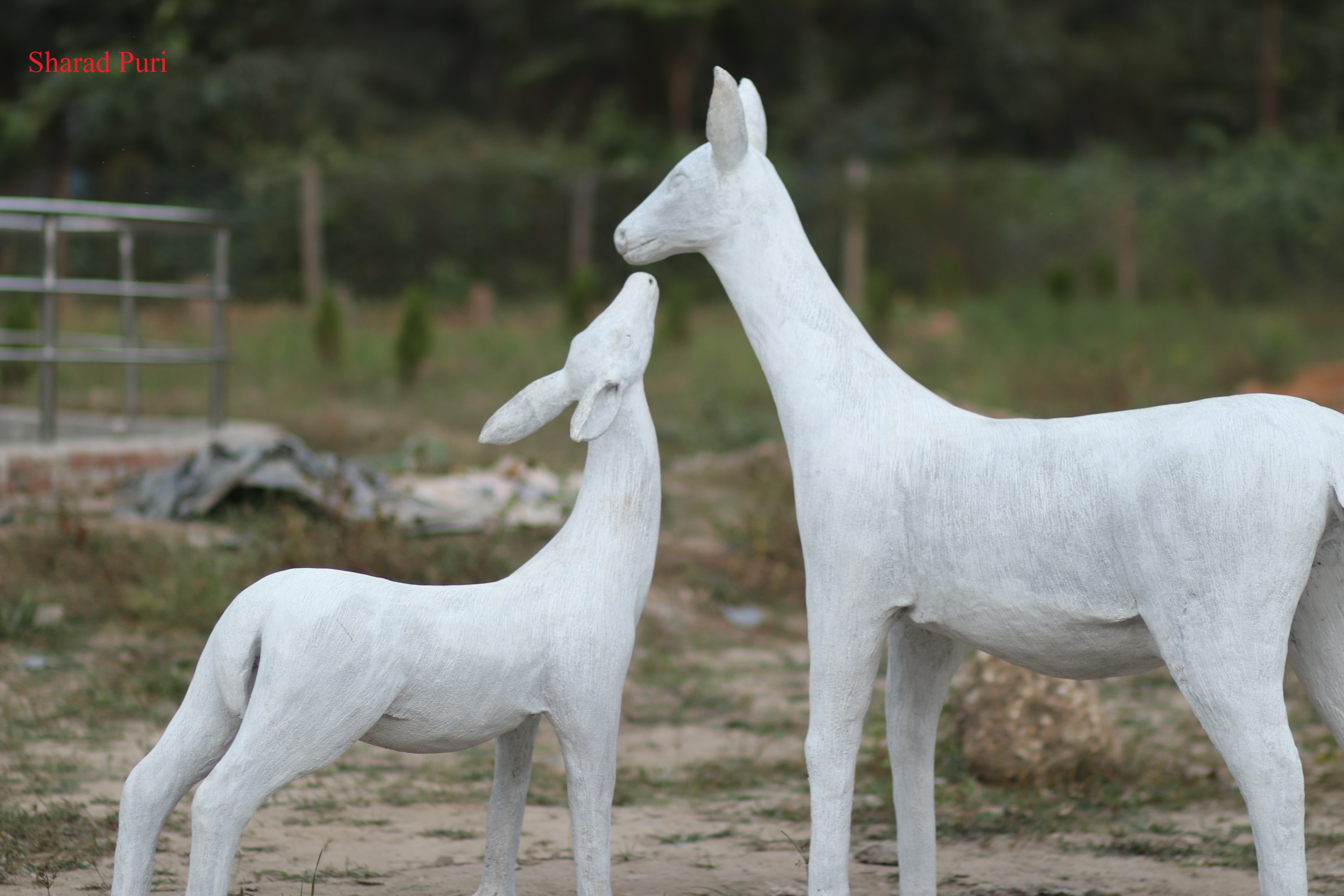
Deer love sculpture

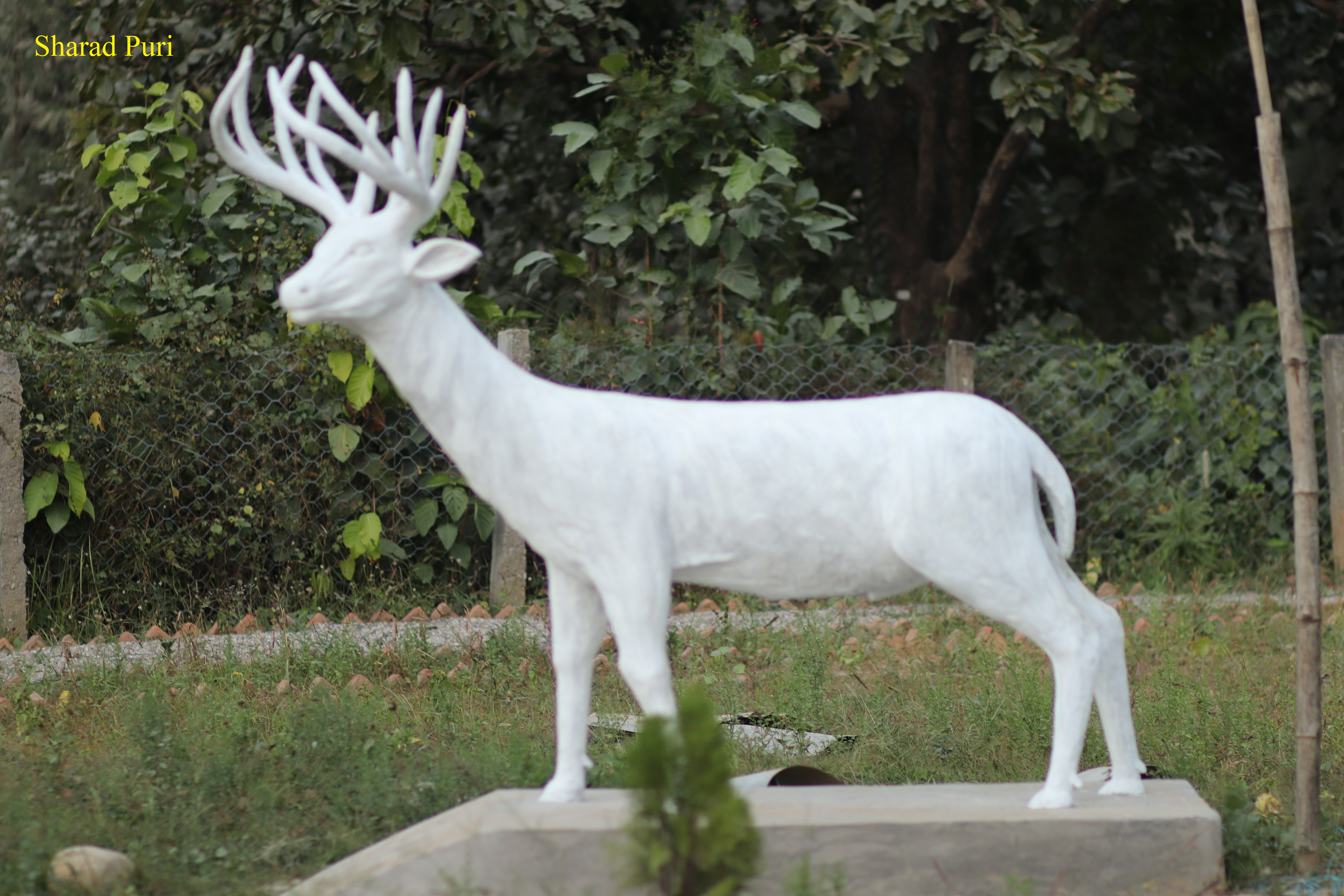
Swamp Deer sculpture
