= Saya Bhandari =

Actor and Model

- साया भण्डारी
- Born: Dang, Nepal
- Education: Batchelor's Degree- TU
- Years active: present
- Known for: Actress / Model

Saya Bhandari (Nepali : साया भण्डारी ) is a Nepali model and actress, known for her significant contributions to Nepali music videos. She was born in Dang, Nepal.

Saya Bhandari has appeared in approximately 500 music videos. Some of her popular music videos include "Sun Sabaile Sun," "Hera Oi Daiba Hera," and "Pirati Nalam Maya". She received the Best Folk Duet Music Video Model award at the 3rd Nepal Music and Fashion Awards in 2079 BS (2022 AD) for her performance in the music video "Chari Banaima," winning her fifth award in this field.

== Awards ==
SN	Award Title	Award Category	Notable Work	Result	ref
1	Nepal music and fashion award 2079 BS	Best model (Folk and duet )	Chari Banaima	won	
2	National Folk & Duet Award 2078 BS	Best Music Video model Act (Folk and duet song)	Pirati Nalam Maya		
3	4th National Sadhana Music Award 2076	Best model female (Folk and duet song)	"Ke yasto huna lekheko"	won	
4	Epik Music Award 2075	Best Music Video Model Female	Suna Sabaile Suna	won	
5	2nd National Brand Music Awards-2079	Best Folk & Duet female model (Acting)			
6	Sagarmatha Music Award 2076	Best New Model - Female	K yesto Huna Lekheko	won	

== Music videos ==
SN	Name	Cast	ref
1	Ke Yesto Huna Lekheko		
2	Pirati Nalam Maya Mann Polchha		
3	Mayama Kina bhayo		
4	Chari Banai ma		
5	Daila Mathi Photo		
