= Amar Oli =

Nepalese film director

- Born: August 20, 1980; Dang, Nepal
- Occupations: Film director Producer
- Years active: 2003–present
- Spouse: Ambika Adhikari
- Parents: Bhim Bahadur Oli (father); Challi Kumari Oli (mother)

Amar Oli (born 20 August 1980 at Dang district, Nepal) is a film director working primarily in the Nepali film industry for more than a decade. He began his career as an assistant director and actor. Later, he focused on other aspects of film making such as production, cinematography and directing. He has produced and directed several Nepali movies such as Aarop, Chot and Dhartiputra, documentaries, and music videos.

== Early life ==
Oli was passionate about movies since his childhood. In 2005, he got an opportunity to work on a Nepali film as an assistant director.

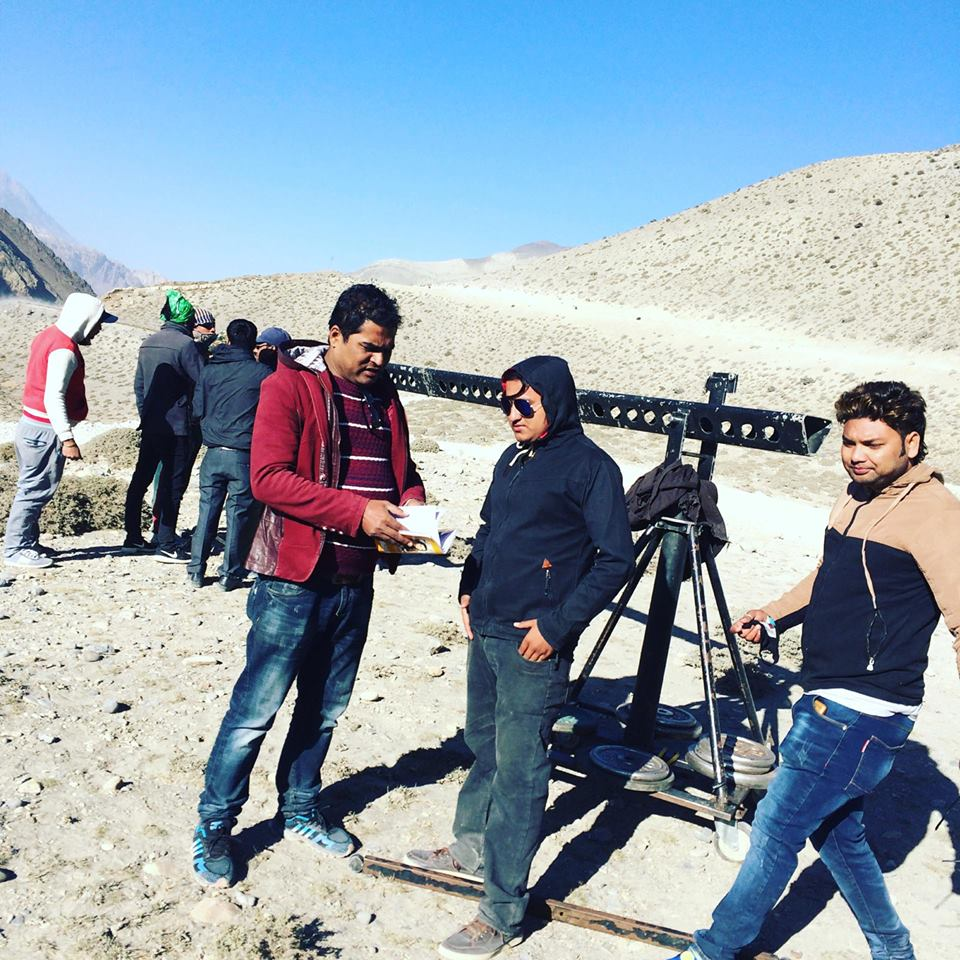
Shooting a film

== Filmography ==
Movie	Year	Role
Dhartiputra	2013	Director
Way to Injury	2015	Director
Aarop	2016	Director
Chot	2017	Director
Break Up	2018	Director
