= Bhupendra Budhathoki =

Nepali songwriter and policeman (born 1994)

Bhopendra Kumar Budhathoki भोपेन्द्र कुमार बुढाथोकी
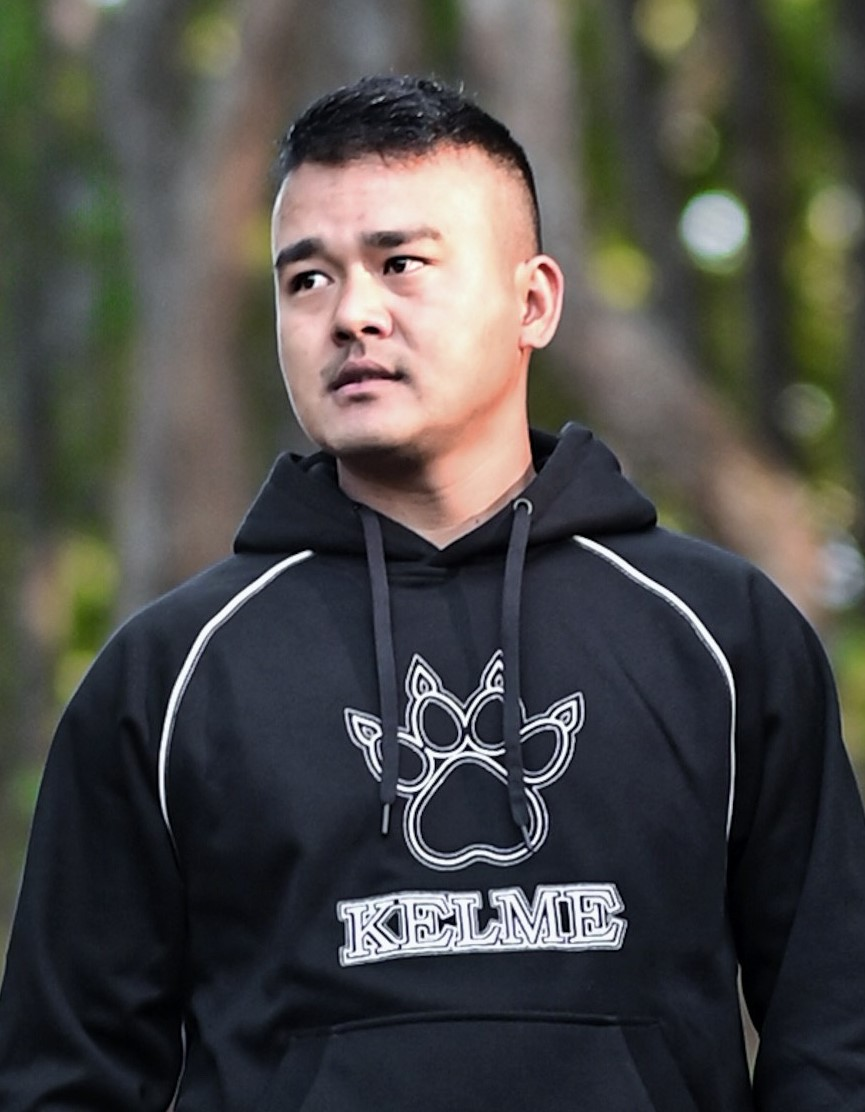

Background information
- Born: September 7, 1994 (age 32); Dang District, Nepal
- Origin: Nepal
- Occupations: Songwriter, police officer
- Years active: 2018—present

Bhopendra Kumar Budhathoki (Nepali: भोपेन्द्र कुमार बुढाथोकी; born 7 September 1994) is also known as Bhupendra Budhathoki is a Nepalese songwriter, and an officer of Nepal Police from Dang district who currently holds the rank of inspector.

== Biography ==
Budhathoki is a Nepali songwriter, model, and officer of the Nepal Police. Along with his police duties, he also dedicates some of his spare time to writing songs and poems "Phool Bhanu Jindagilai", "Dhoka Mathi Dhoka", "Pradeshi ko Dashain Tihar", "Aba Khusi", "Dada Pari Mero Maya" and "Mutu Tutda", are among his well-known songs.

Budhathoki made his debut through his song "Hami Nepal Prahari" sung by Rajesh Payal Rai in 2018 and has since pursued his musical career alongside his work as a police inspector. He has received national recognition for his music lyrics and has been awarded more than two music awards throughout his career.

== Songs ==
SN	Songs name	Singer	Release date
1	Phool Bhanu Jindagilai	Purnima Lama	2018
2	Nachne Ho Gauney Ho	Jhakkad Thapa	2019
3	Pubg Song	Gobinda Chemjong Limbu	2019
4	Aaba Khusi	Purnima Lama	2020
5	Dada Pari Mero Maya	Purnima Lama	2020
6	Lahure ko Katha	Akash BK	2020
7	Pradeshi Ko Dashain Tihar	Bhupu Pandey	2020
9	Dhoka Mathi Dhoka	Pramod Kharel	2021
10	Mutu Tutda	Pramod Kharel	2022
11	Hami Nepal Prahari	Rajesh Payal Rai	2018
12	Pardeshi Hunai Man Chhaina	Shanti Shree Pariyar & Khem Century	

== Awards and nomination ==
Budhathoki has been awarded with the second "National Brand Music Award" for his outstanding contribution to music. He received the Best Lyricist Award for a Modern Song at the ceremony.

SN	Award	Award title	Result
1	7th National Rapti Music Award	New Young Songwriter	Won
2	2nd National Brand Music Award	Best Modern Song New Lyricist	Won
3	8th National Rapti Music Award	Best Lyricist Modern Song	Nominated
4	2nd Star Music Video Award 2023	Best Lyricist	Nominated
5	4th Annual National OSNEPAL Music Award - 2023	Best Modern Lyricist	Won
6	Sagarmatha Music Award - 2023	Best Pop Adhunik Lyricist of the year (Male Jury)	Won
7	12th Music Khabar Music Award	Jury Award Lyricist Modern Song winner	Won
8	5th Epic Nepal Music Award 2025	Best modern song	Won
9	16th Bindabasini Music Award	Best Lyrics	Won
