= Pravan Bhusal =

Nepalese actor

- प्रवण भुसाल
- Born: September 7, 1983 (age 42); Dang Nepal
- Citizenship: Neplease
- Occupation: Actor
- Years active: 2004-Present

Pravan Bhusal (Nepali: प्रवण भुसाल; born September 7, 1983 AD, in Dang, Nepal), is a Nepali actor, recognized for his contributions to the Nepali film industry. He has primarily appeared in films within the comedy and drama genres.

== About ==
Bhusal began his acting career in 2004 AD. Among his notable works is the film Ghanachakkar, released in 2022, where he shared the screen with actors like Saugat Malla and Salon Basnet. Bhusal has been awarded from different awards, including Quality Entertainment Awards.

== Awards ==
SN	Award Title	Award Category	Noatable Work	Result	Ref
1	Quality Entertainment Awards 2018	Best Actor in Nepal Role	Mandira - Movie	Won	
2	5th PIM Nepal Film Festival -2021	Best Actor (Short Film)	The Daughter	Won	
3	Nepal Rural Film Festival -2023	Best Actor (Short Film)	Paribartan	Won	

== Movies and music videos ==
SN	Title	Type	Release date	Credit	Ref
1	Lukamari	Nepali Movie	2016	Actor	
2	AK-47	Nepali Movie		Actor	
3	Mandira	Nepali Movie		Actor	
4	Ghanachakkar	Nepali Movie		Actor	
5	Jiskera Maskera	Music Video	2023	Model	
6	Yo Teej Ma Nachne Ho	Music Video	2020	Model	
7	Sawanko Bhel Jasto	Music Video	2022	Model	
8	The Story of Gang	Nepali Movie	2010	Actor	
9	Chitthi	Nepali Movie		Actor	
