= Nitin Chand =

Film Director From Nepal

- नितिन चन्द
- Born: March 12, 1987 (age 39); Dang Nepal
- Years active: 2006- present
- Known for: Director / DoP

Nitin Chand (Nepali:नितिन चन्द) also known as Nitin Kumar Chand, is a film and music video director and producer from Nepal, born on March 12, 1987. He has been active in the industry since 2006 and is particularly recognized for his work in music videos and television commercials.

== Biography ==
Director Nitin Chand, born in Dang, Nepal, started his career in 2006. In addition to directing, he has made significant contributions as an editor and cinematographer, collaborating with T-Series from 2007 to 2009. With over a decade of active work, Chand has successfully created more than 150 music videos and commercials, showcasing his expertise in the industry. "Oye Jhuma", "I Love You", and "Simsime Pani " are some popular music videos in his career. He is also credited with playing a significant role in advancing the careers of actors such as Paul Shah, Aanchal Sharma and Swastima Khadka. His recently released Music Video is "Eh Desh". "Eh Desh" is a Nepali musical film, Music created by Suman Rai, and directed by Nitin Chand, released in 2026. The film is dedicated to the families affected by the floods that occurred in Rasuwa and Nuwakot on Bhadra 10, 2083 BS.

== Filmography ==
=== Movie ===
| SN | Movie name | Release date | ref |
|---|---|---|---|
| 1 | Johnny Gentleman | 2018 AD | |
| 2 | Eh Desh (Musical Film) | 2026 AD | |

=== Music videos ===
| SN | Music video name | Cast | Credit | Ref |
|---|---|---|---|---|
| 1 | Purnimako Chandramalai | | | |
| 2 | Oye Jhuma" (by Pramod Kharel) | | | |
| 3 | I Love You | | | |
| 4 | pyakuli | | Director | |
| 5 | Kina Chhin Chhin | | Director | |
| 6 | Chha Ki Chhaina | | | |

== Awards and nominations ==
| SN | Award title | Award category | Notable work | Result | Ref |
|---|---|---|---|---|---|
| 1 | CAN International Award 2024 | | | | |
| 2 | Glam Biz Award - 2022 | Best Music Video | Teri Meri Dastaan | won | |
| 3 | Nepal Music and Fashion Awards | Best Cinematographer | Maya Baiguni | won | |
