= Rapti Rural Municipality =

Gaunpalika in Lumbini Province, Nepal

Rapti Rural Municipality राप्ती गाउँपालिका
- Gaunpalika
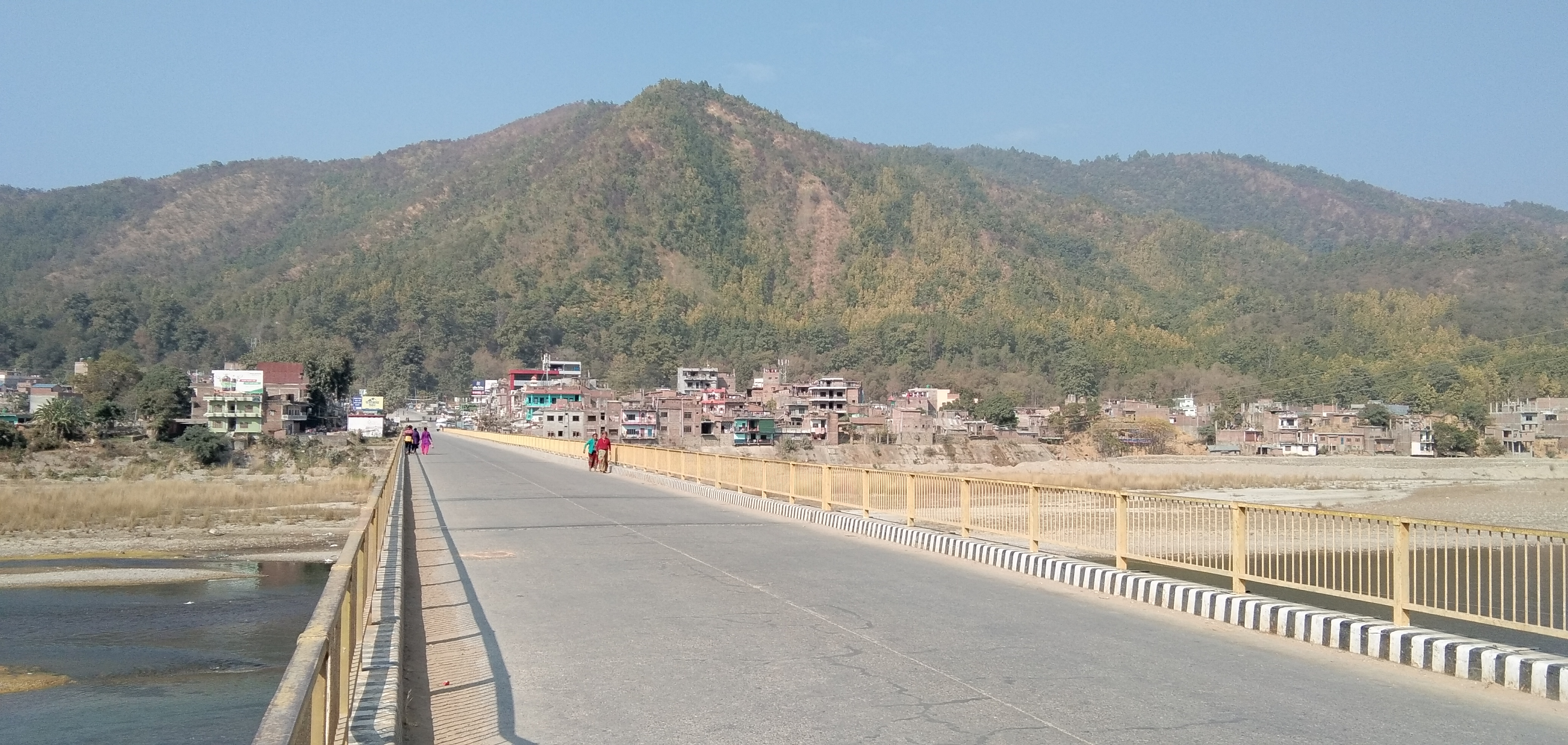
- Bhalubang bridge

- Location in Nepal
- Coordinates: 27.843006°N 82.715408°E
- Country: Nepal
- Province: Lumbini Province
- District: Dang District

Population
  - Total: 40,764
- Time zone: UTC+5:45 (Nepal Time)
- Website: http://raptimundang.gov.np/

Rapti Rural Municipality (Nepali : राप्ती गाउँपालिका) is a gaunpalika in Dang District in Lumbini Province of Nepal. On 12 March 2017, the government of Nepal implemented a new local administrative structure, with the implementation of the new local administrative structure, VDCs have been replaced with municipal and Village Councils. Rapti is one of these 753 local units.

== Demographics ==
At the time of the 2011 Nepal census, Rapti Rural Municipality had a population of 40,949. Of these, 50.0% spoke Tharu, 45.7% Nepali, 1.4% Magar, 0.7% Kham, 0.7% Urdu, 0.6% Hindi, 0.4% Gurung, 0.1% Bhojpuri, 0.1% Maithili, 0.1% Newar and 0.1% other languages as their first language.

In terms of ethnicity/caste, 50.4% were Tharu, 13.4% Magar, 9.6% Hill Brahmin, 9.6% Chhetri, 4.0% Kumal, 2.3% Kami, 2.1% Sanyasi/Dasnami, 1.8% Damai/Dholi, 1.5% Musalman, 1.5% Thakuri, 0.8% Gurung, 0.8% Sarki, 0.6% Halwai, 0.5% Newar, 0.3% Badi, 0.2% other Terai, 0.1% Tamang and 0.2% others.

In terms of religion, 95.4% were Hindu, 1.5% Muslim, 1.4% Christian, 1.2% Buddhist, 0.3% Prakriti and 0.1% others.

In terms of literacy, 66.4% could read and write, 2.9% could only read and 30.5% could neither read nor write.
