= Dang District, Nepal =

District in Lumbini Province, FDR Nepal

Dang District दाङ जिल्ला
- District
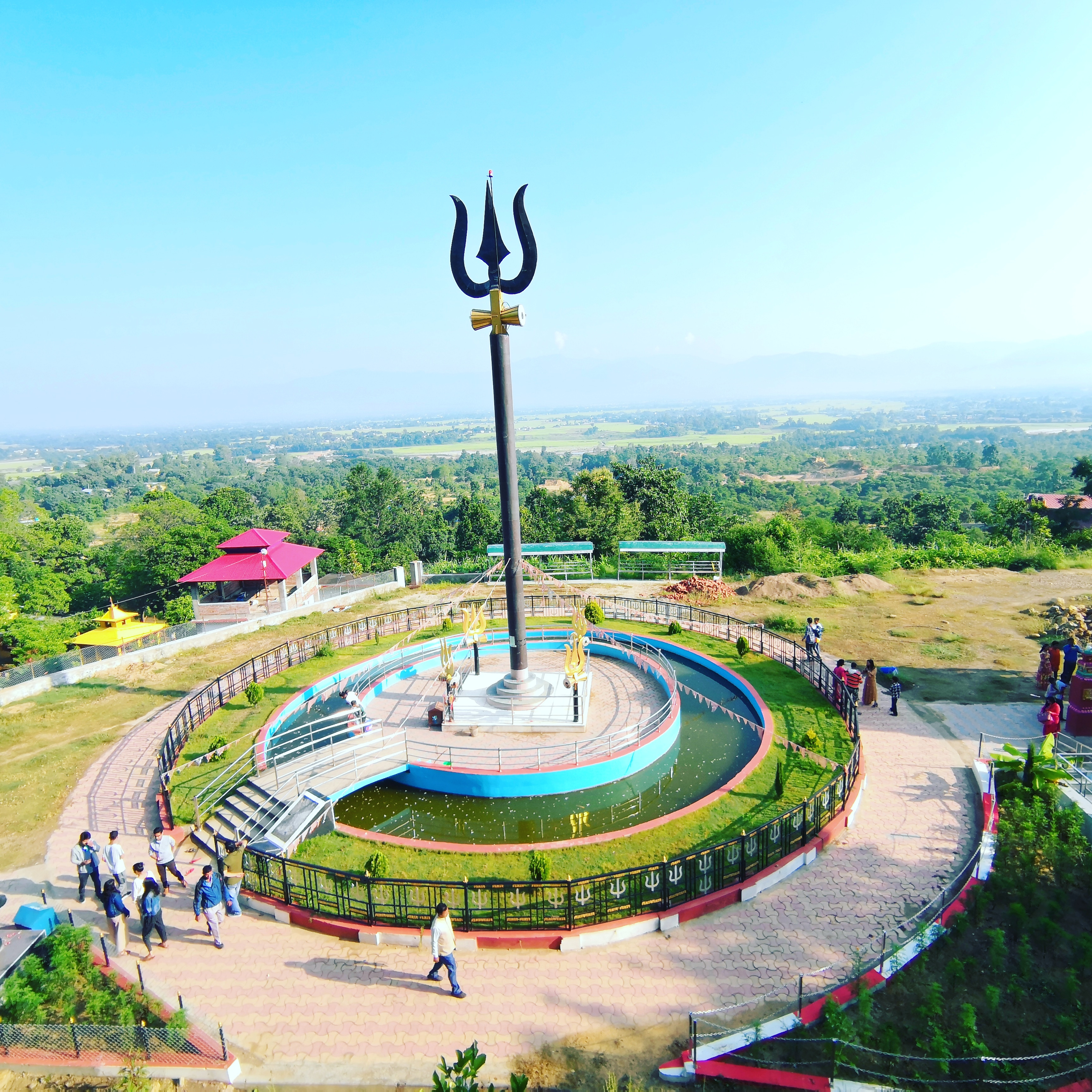
- World's largest Trishula (trident of Shiva) at Pandaveshwar Temple in Dang District

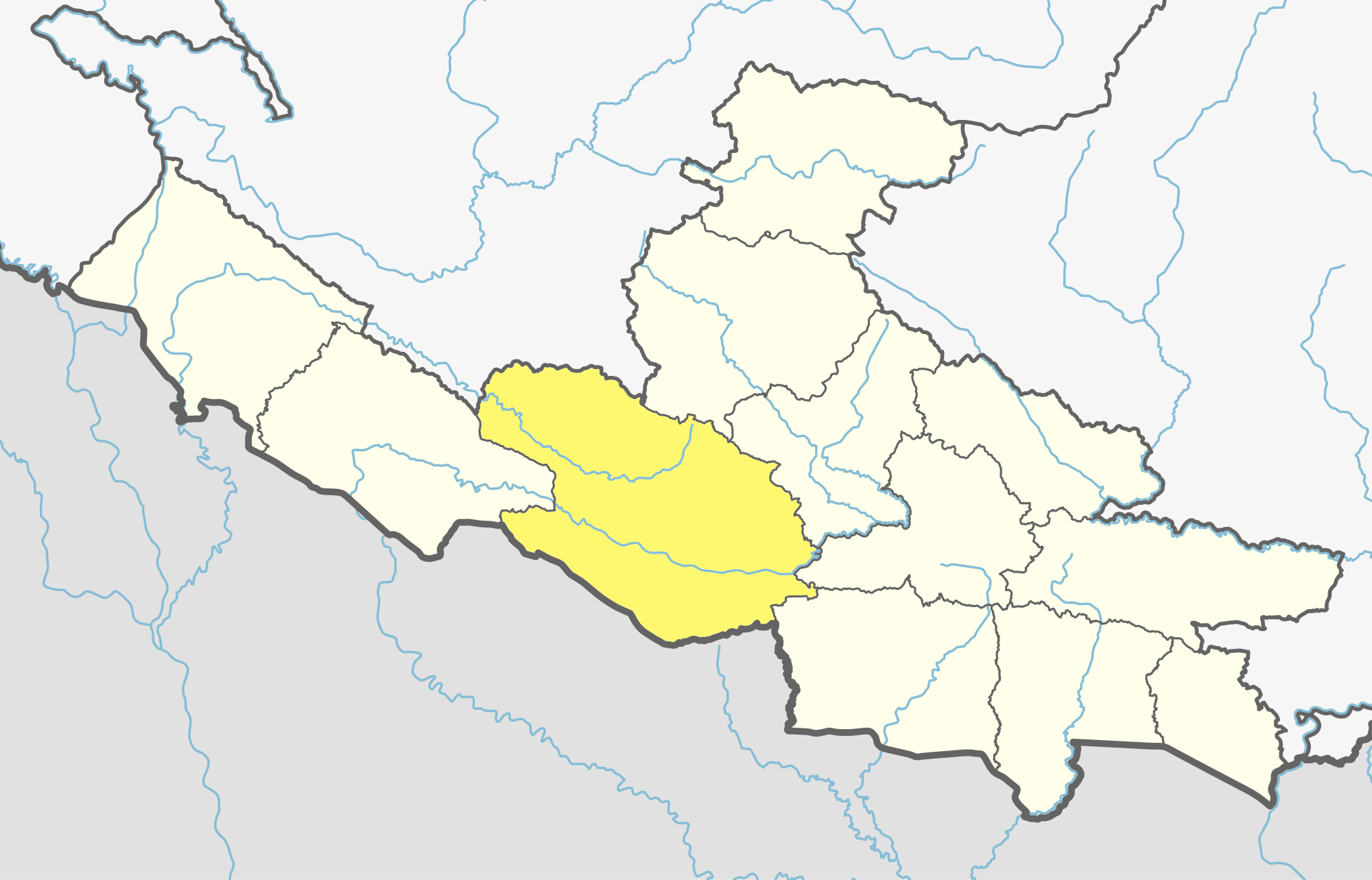
- Location of Dang (dark yellow) in Lumbini Province
- Country: Nepal
- Province: Lumbini Province
- Established: 17 May 1951
- Admin HQ.: Ghorahi

Government
  - Type: Coordination committee
  - Body: DCC, Dāng Deukhuri

Area
  - Total: 2,955 km^{2} (1,141 sq mi)

Population (2021)
  - Total: 674,993
  - Density: 228.4/km^{2} (591.6/sq mi)
- Time zone: UTC+05:45 (NPT)
- Literacy rate: 81.4%
- Main languages: Nepali, Tharu

Dang District (Nepali: दाङ जिल्ला, [d̪äŋ]) is a district of Lumbini Province located in the Inner Terai Rapti Zone of midwestern Nepal. Dang Valley is the first largest valley in Asia and the second largest in the world. It is surrounded by the Sivalik Hills and the Mahabharata Range. Ghorahi is the capital of the Dang district and Deukhuri of the Dang district is capital of the Lumbini province. The district headquarter Ghorahi is the seventh largest city and also the Lumbini province headquarters the largest sub-metropolitan city of Nepal. Tulsipur sub-metropolitan city, the second largest city of Dang, is a major transportation hub with extensive road and air networks. The district covers an area of 2,955 km^{2} and has a population of 674,993 (2021 census).

Dang district has been archaeologically studied extensively since the 20th century due to the discoveries of ancient fossils of apes and early humans. The district is considered the center of Sanskrit language in Nepal and is home to Nepal's second oldest university, Nepal Sanskrit University, which is the only Sanskrit university of the country, as well as Rapti Academy of Health Sciences (RAHS), the state-owned medical college of Lumbini Province with the Prime Minister of Nepal as the Chancellor. Historically, the valley of Dang was a prominent pilgrim place of the Nath Hindu monastic movement, and hence was also famous as 'the land of the Gorakhnath yogis'. The district has numerous temples and gumbas with puranic legendary connections to Mahābhārata, Shaivism, Shaktism and Gorakhnath, making it one of the richest cultural sites of the country.

== History and prehistory ==
=== Prehistory ===
Archeologists consider the Churiya range very ancient with the existence of Sivapithecus (syn:Ramapithecus), a link between man and ape. The pre-historic study of Dang valley has been carried out by Tribhuvan University since 1966, including the geological study of the Valley by Robert M. West from the American Museum of Natural History and the Department of Mines of then His Majesty's Government of Nepal from 1976, as well as the Paleolithic study of Dang by University of Erlangen-Nuremberg (Fredrich-Alexander-Universität) of Germany in 1984, among others. According to these concurrent researches, Dang valley was a lake approximately 2.5 to 1 million years ago.

During 1984–1986, German researcher Gudrun Corvinus studied the miocene-pliocene stratigraphy and geology of Dang valley researching on the pleistocene holocene period of ancient human settlements. She studied the exposed section of the road being constructed between Koilabas and the Dang Valley running through Deukhuri. Hand axes and other artifacts dated to early Paleolithic (1.8 million to 100,000 years ago) have been found in alluvial deposits along the Babai River in Dang Valley. Archeologists classify these as Acheulean, i.e. 'second-generation' toolmaking that succeeds the very oldest Olduwan.

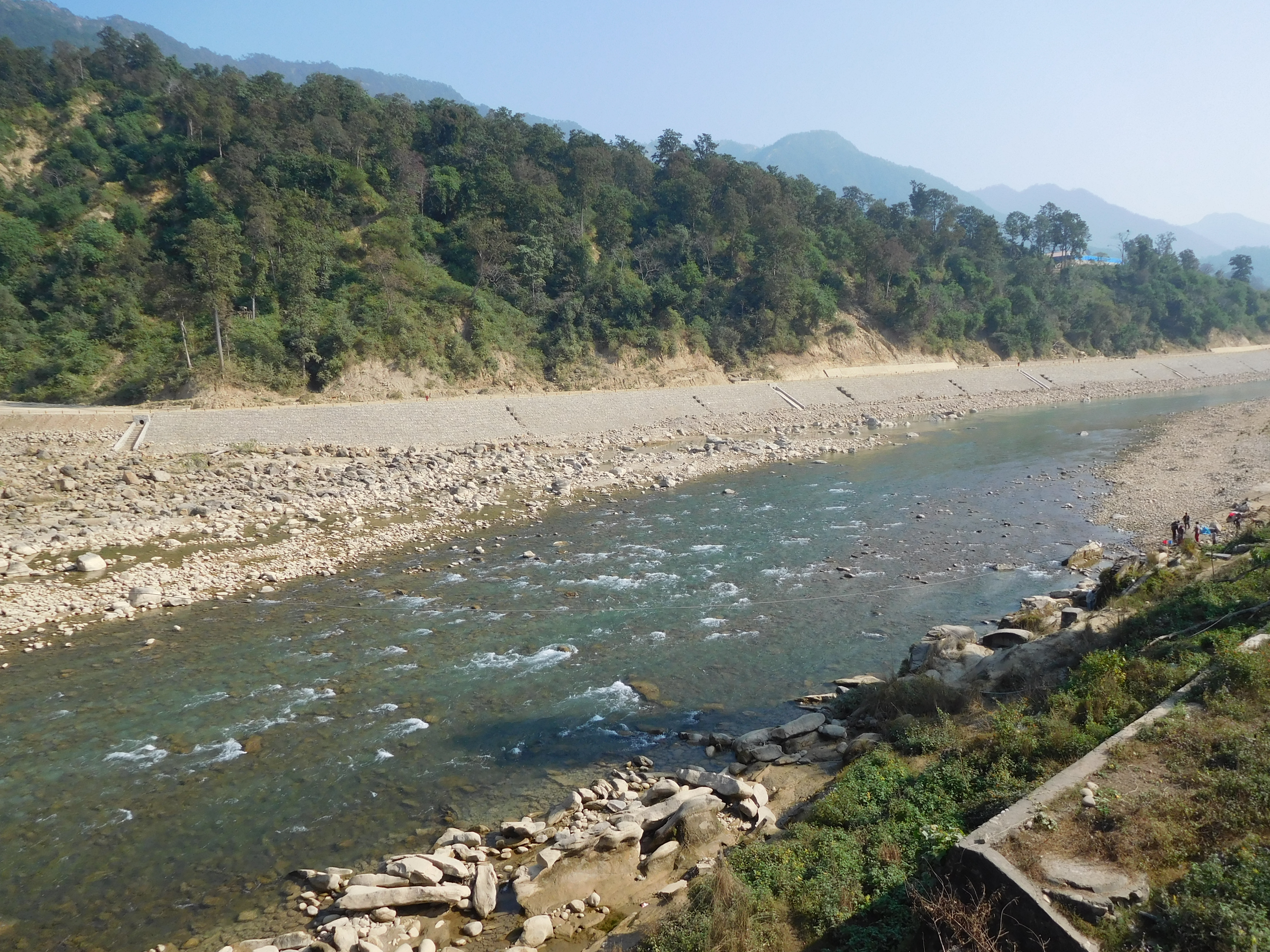
Paleolithic artifacts (1.8 million to 100,000 years ago) site of Babai River in Dang Valley

There are more numerous less ancient archeological sites dating to the Upper Paleolithic/Late Pleistocene (about 50,000 to 10,000 years ago). These are also along the Babai, as well as in Deukhuri Valley (Rapti River) adjacent and south of Dang Valley. Archeologists classify these as Acheulean, i.e. 'second-generation' toolmaking that succeeds the very oldest Olduwan.

=== Tharus ===
Since ancient times, Dang valley is considered to have been inhabited by the indigenous Tharu people, albeit the exact timing of origin is still a matter of archeological research Researchers consider that the valley was a growing center of Tharu civilisation. In the current times, Tharu people comprise one of the prominent indigenous ethnic communities of Nepal, and the Tharus inhabiting Dang valley are called Dangaura Tharus who have been able to retain their rich and unique traditions.

=== Medieval and Modern History ===
With a long history of over 1300 years, the valley is recognised to have been a focal pilgrimage and shelter place for the disciples of Nath sect, the followers of Hindu yogi and mahasiddha Gorakhnath and his guru Matsyendranath. The Goraksha or Ratnanath temple in the district is believed to have been built by king-turned-disciple Ratnanath, whose original name was King Ratnaparikshak and was given initiation by Gorakhnath himself in the nearby forest.

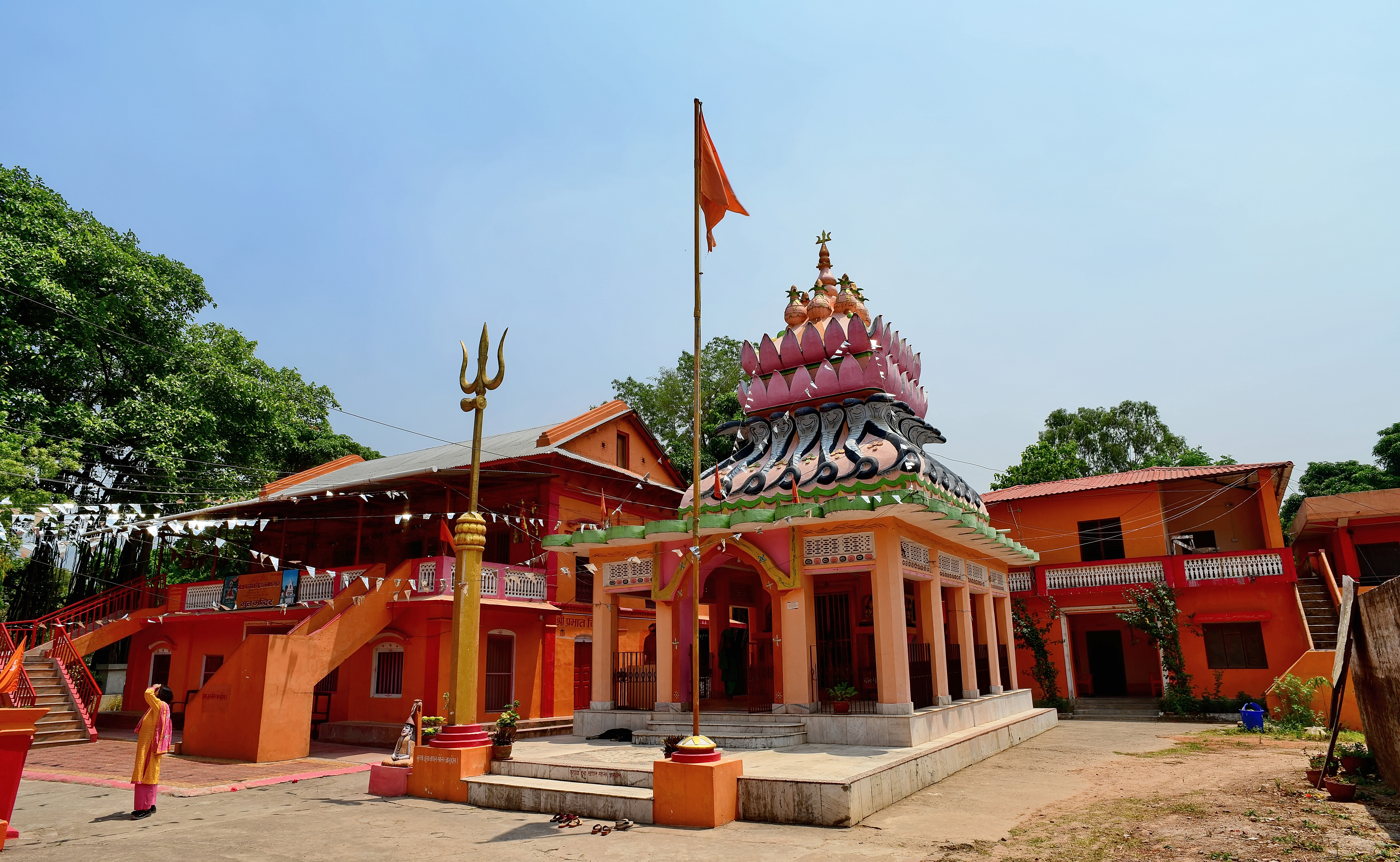
The valley remained a pilgrim place for disciples of mahasiddha Gorakhnath for over 1300 years in the Indian sub-continent

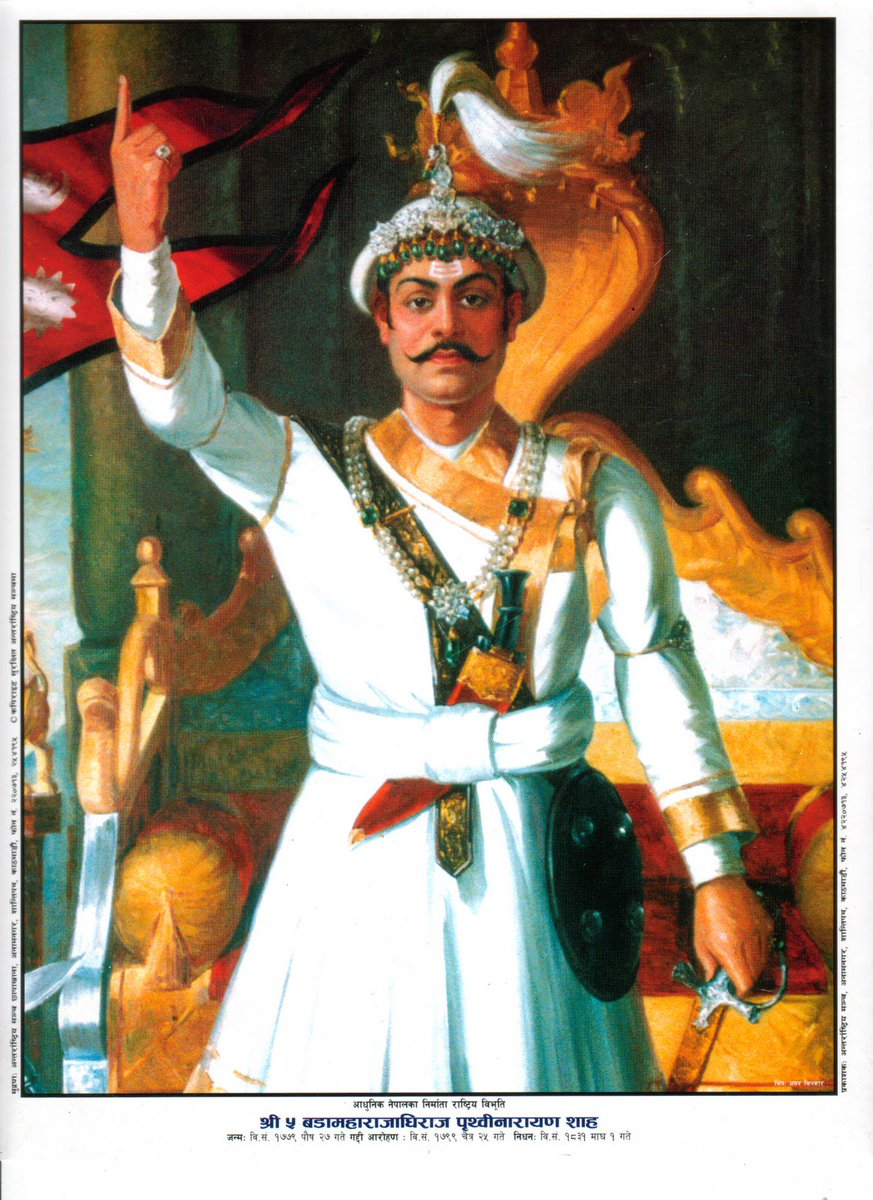
Dang was annexed in 1760 AD by King Prithvi Narayan Shah

Evidence show that when the Khasa Kingdom was in existence in western Nepal, Dang was virtually under their political domination. One of the document of Punya Malla mentions that the valley was awarded to Jayakar Pundit as a virta in 1336 AD. From 1350 AD onwards, Meghraj Singh Chauhan of Chauhan dynasty is recorded to have been the king of the region as per the records in the Yogi Ratna Nath's Chaughera monastery of Dang valley, the third-in-line of Yogi Gorakhnath. The temple held a strong spiritual importance over the rulers of the valley, even after the change of power to new dynasties as such the internal activities of the temple were almost entirely unaffected for hundreds of years. Nevills Gazetteer of Bahreich (1922:124) mentions that in 1485 AD, Dangdun was in the possession of Udat Singh. Evidence shows that the last independent king Nawal Singh Chauhan ruled from Chaughera of Dang until 1760 AD as the House of Tulsipur which ruled one of the largest Taluqs of Oudh, India, which then included the Dang and Deukhuri Valleys.The town shares its name with another Tulsipur in Dang Deukhuri District, Nepal (c.65k North); the two towns are linked historically by having the same ruler.

In 1760 AD, Gorkhali King Prithvi Narayan Shah annexed the valley into the expanding Gorkha Kingdom. Three years later, Dang (except Tulsipur lands south of the Siwalik Hills) was given as a dowry to the King of Salyan in 1763 AD for the marriage of King Prithvi Narayan Shah's daughter. Around 1808 AD, Dang valley was finally annexed into the Kingdom of Nepal when Salyan state merged with the Unified Nepal of Shah kings.

Since Dang was somewhat higher, hotter, better-drained and therefore less malarial than most Inner Terai valleys in Nepal, it was settled to some extent by Shah and Rana courtiers and other Nepalese. Deukhuri was more of a Tharu enclave until DDT was introduced to control the disease-bearing Anopheles mosquito in the 1950s. Before the construction of Rapti Bridge, Koilabas of Dang Valley was a major trading post with India which was slowly abandoned later. Koilabas has remnants of Persian Mughal Empire- style architecture visible in its ruins even now. Long time ago, Dang used to be the capital of Rapti Zone.

== Administration ==
The district consists of two sub-metropolitan cities and eight municipalities, out of which one is an urban municipality and seven are rural municipalities. The administrative regions are as follows:

- Ghorahi Sub-Metropolitan City
- Tulsipur Sub-Metropolitan City
- Lamahi Municipality
- Gadhawa Rural Municipality
- Rajpur Rural Municipality
- Shantinagar Rural Municipality
- Rapti Rural Municipality
- Banglachuli Rural Municipality
- Dangisharan Rural Municipality
- Babai Rural Municipality

== Geography and Climate ==
This district consists of the larger easterly and upstream portions of the parallel Inner Terai valleys of Dang and Deukhuri, plus enclosing ranges of hills and mountains. Downstream, both valleys cross into Banke District.

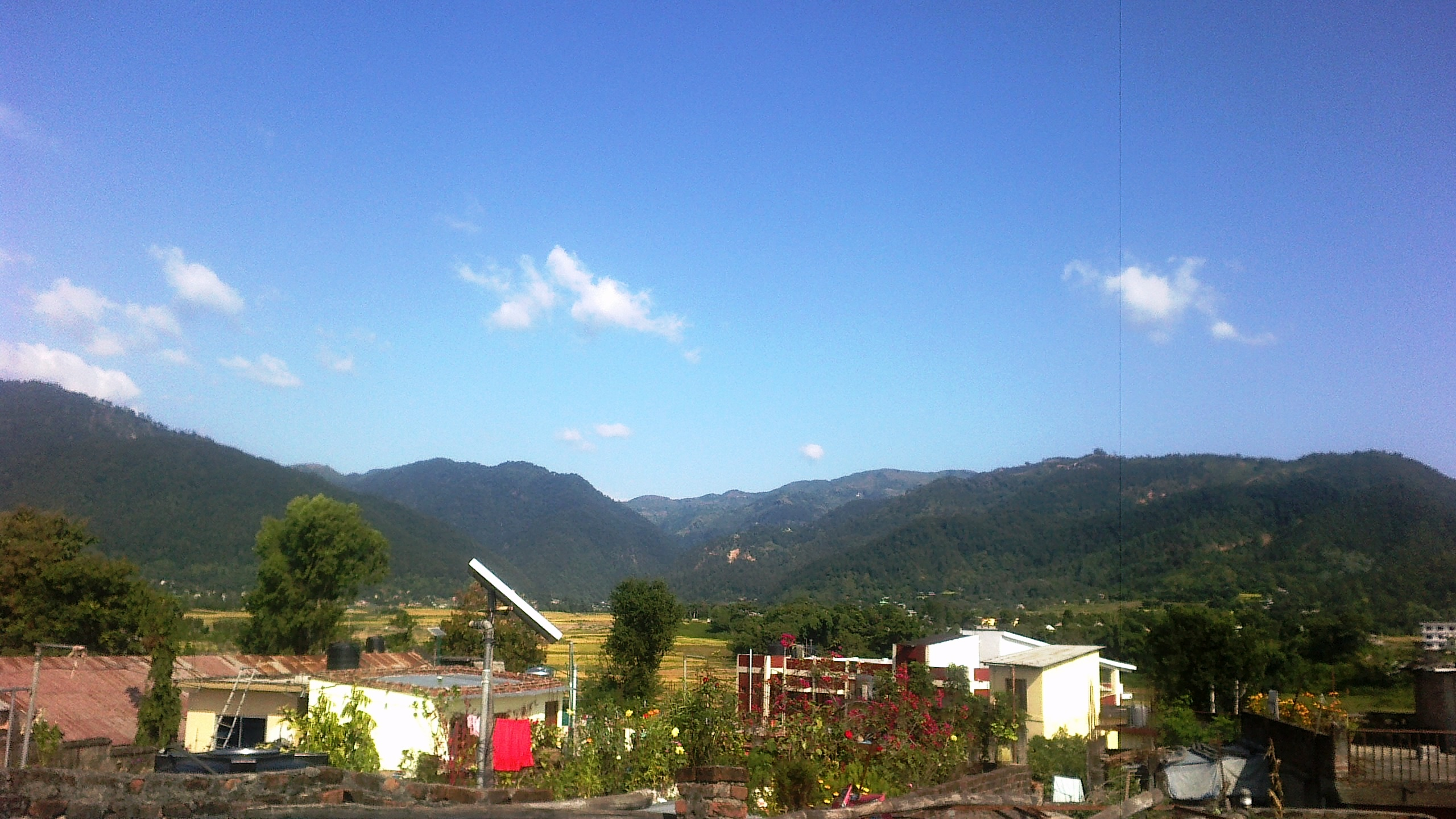
Surrounding hills of Ghorahi, Dang Valley

To the south, the district borders Uttar Pradesh, a state in India, Nepal's neighboring country—specifically the Balarampur and Shravasti districts of Awadh. Because the international border follows the southern edge of the outermost Siwalik foothills called the Dudhwa Range, there is no Outer Terai extending onto the main Ganges Plain inside this district. The permeable geology of the Siwaliks does not support moisture retention or soil development, so they are covered with unproductive scrub forest.

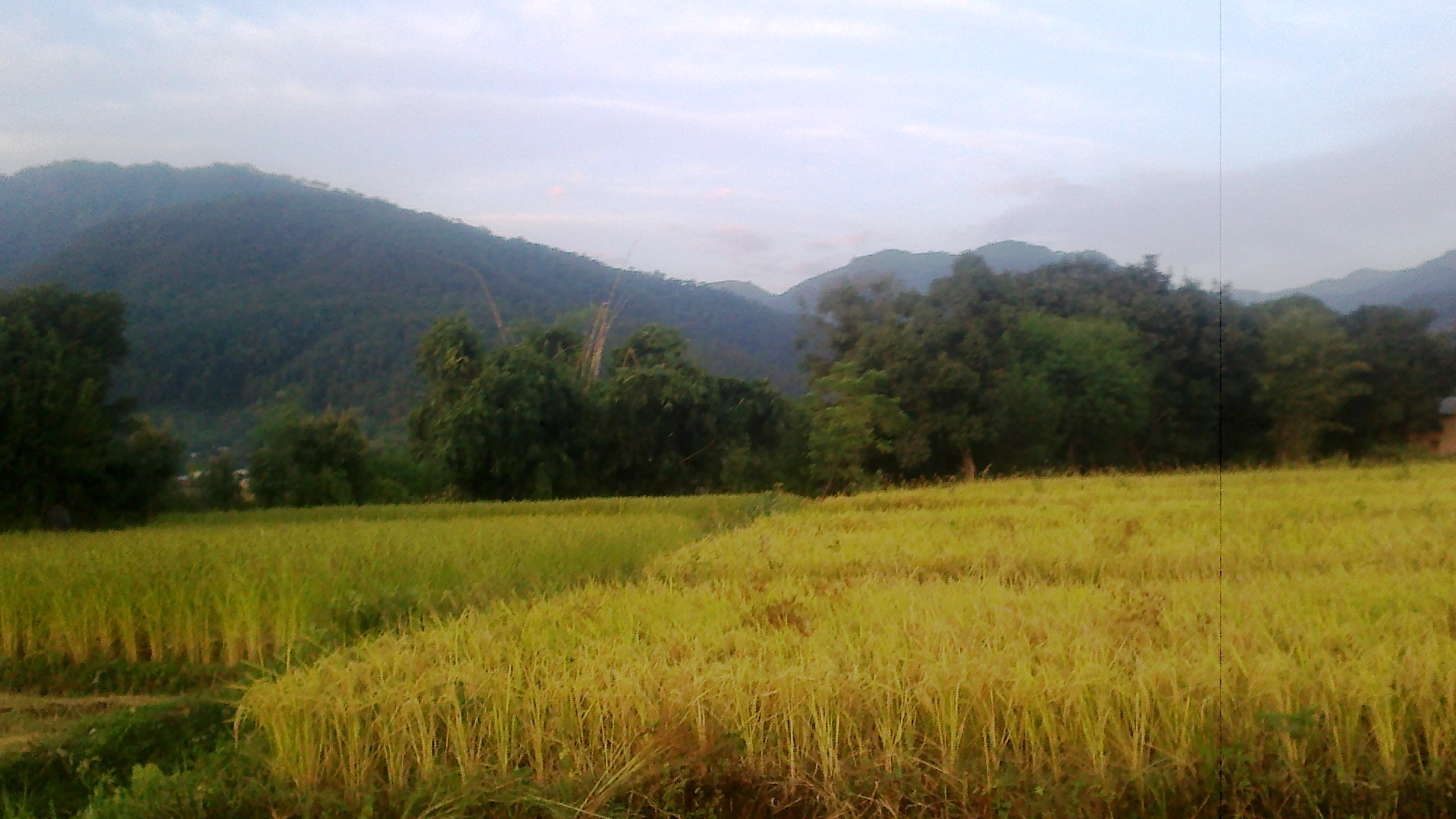
Rice fields in Dang district

The Dudhwas rise steeply to a crest at about 700 meters, then slope more gradually into the Deukhuri Valley, down to 250 meters elevation at the Rapti River. The Dudhwas extend more than 100 km, causing the Rapti to detour west around them before turning southeast down the main trend of the plains into India. Deukhuri's climate is nearly tropical and it is well watered by the river, as well as possessing abundant groundwater. North of Deukhuri Valley, the Dang Range rises as high as 1,000 meters with passes at about 700 meters. The Dang Valley lies north of these hills, drained by the Babai River tributary to the Ghaghara (Karnali). Valley elevations range from 600 meters along the Babai with alluvial slopes gradually rising northward to 700 meters along the base of the Mahabharat Range. The district then extends upslope to the crest of the Mahabharats at 1,500 to 1,700 meters elevation. The bordering districts to the north are Pyuthan, Rolpa, and Salyan. The Rapti River of Western Nepal traverses through most of the lower Dang valley. It flows beneath the Churia range first on the northern side of the hills and then leaves the hills on the southern side. Nepal's second-longest bridge over Rapti river in Dang district connects Sisahaniya of Rapti Rural Municipality with Mahadeva of Gadawa Rural Municipality in the district.

Climate zone	Elevation Range	% of Area
Lower Tropical	below 300 meters (1,000 ft)	18.1%
Upper Tropical	300 to 1,000 meters 1,000 to 3,300 ft.	69.9%
Subtropical	1,000 to 2,000 meters 3,300 to 6,600 ft.	12.0%

Climate data for Dang, (elevation 663 m (2,175 ft), 1991−2020 normals)
Month	Jan	Feb	Mar	Apr	May	Jun	Jul	Aug	Sep	Oct	Nov	Dec	Year
Mean daily maximum °C (°F)	20.7 (69.3)	23.6 (74.5)	28.7 (83.7)	33.2 (91.8)	33.9 (93.0)	32.7 (90.9)	30.4 (86.7)	30.5 (86.9)	30.2 (86.4)	29.1 (84.4)	25.8 (78.4)	22.3 (72.1)	28.4 (83.1)
Daily mean °C (°F)	13.3 (55.9)	16.2 (61.2)	21.0 (69.8)	25.6 (78.1)	27.5 (81.5)	27.8 (82.0)	26.8 (80.2)	26.7 (80.1)	25.8 (78.4)	22.7 (72.9)	18.4 (65.1)	14.6 (58.3)	22.2 (72.0)
Mean daily minimum °C (°F)	5.8 (42.4)	8.8 (47.8)	13.2 (55.8)	17.9 (64.2)	21.1 (70.0)	22.8 (73.0)	23.1 (73.6)	22.8 (73.0)	21.4 (70.5)	16.3 (61.3)	11.0 (51.8)	6.9 (44.4)	15.9 (60.6)
Average precipitation mm (inches)	21.6 (0.85)	24.0 (0.94)	20.3 (0.80)	30.0 (1.18)	90.6 (3.57)	249.9 (9.84)	420.9 (16.57)	427.6 (16.83)	233.9 (9.21)	48.4 (1.91)	6.6 (0.26)	6.7 (0.26)	1,580.5 (62.22)
Average precipitation days (≥ 0.1 mm)	2.2	2.4	2.2	2.8	7.2	13.8	21.6	20.7	14.8	3.6	0.3	0.5	92.2
Source: NOAA

== Demographics ==
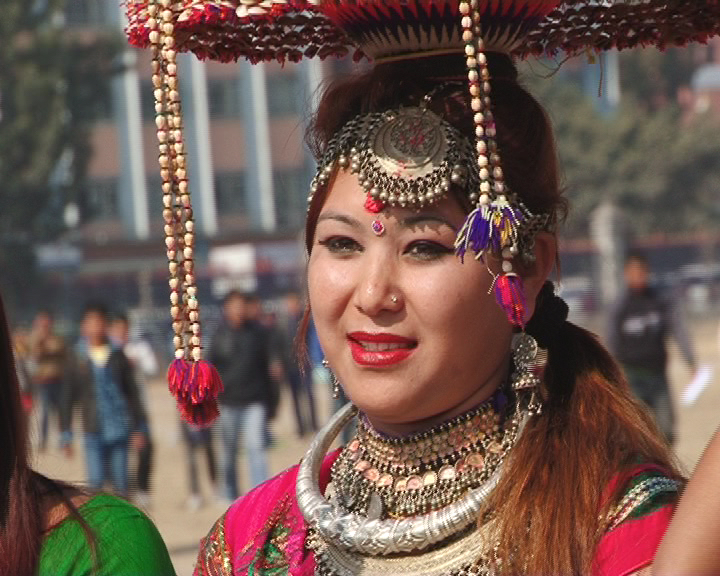
Tharu woman in traditional attire

The dry and agriculturally unproductive Dudhwa range creates a buffer zone between the divergent cultures of the plains of Uttar Pradesh and the Inner Terai. Deukhuri was severely malarial before the late 1950s when DDT came into use to suppress mosquitos so that Tharu people who had evolved resistance managed to live in isolation from other cultures of the plains to the south and the hills to the north. Although road development further reduced Deukhuri's isolation by the 1980s, the valley retains some of its Garden of Eden charm with its lazy river, thick jungle alternating with rice paddies, surrounding hills in the middle distance and unique peoples.

Dang Valley is higher, less tropical, drier and less malarial than Deukhuri. Despite poorer soil and more seasonal streamflow, its healthier climate made it more attractive to settlers from outside even before the introduction of DDT. Since the early 1990s activist groups have been attempting to eradicate the practice of child indentured servitude among the Tharu, many of whom sold young daughters to wealthy families in urban areas. This region has a plurality of people of the Tharu ethnicity. The steep, virtually uninhabited southern slopes of the Mahabharat Range are another cultural buffer zone between traditional Tharu lands and the culturally distinct Middle Hills where Nepali is the dominant language, the homeland of dangi Chhetris. The Kumal (potter) ethnic group is also semi-indigenous.

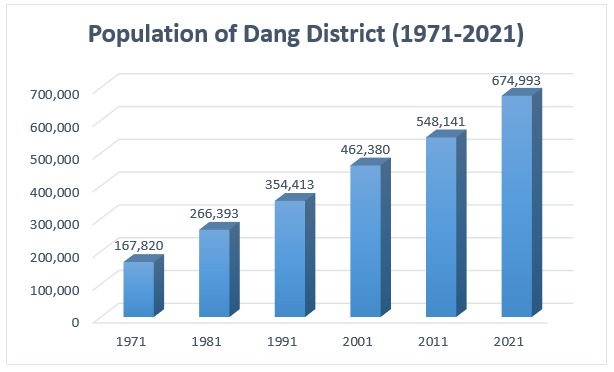
Population of Dang every ten years: 1971-2021

At the time of the 2021 Nepal census, Dang District had a population of 674,993. 8.17% of the population is under 5 years of age. It has a literacy rate of 81.40% and a sex ratio of 1106 females per 1000 males. 439,335 (65.09%) lived in municipalities.

Ethnic groups/castes in Dang district (2021)
1. Chhetri (26.6%)
2. Tharu (26.4%)
3. Magar (14.5%)
4. Bahun (9.46%)
5. Kami (6.84%)
6. Damai (2.85%)
7. Dasnami (1.89%)
8. Sarki (1.76%)
9. Kumal (1.50%)
10. Yadav (1.48%)
11. Thakuri (1.37%)
12. Muslim (0.96%)
13. Other Madheshi non-Dalit (1.49%)
14. Other Hill Janjati (1.22%)
15. Others (1.57%)

Chettri people are the largest ethnicity, making up 26.65% of the population. The second largest group, Tharus make up 26.43% of the population. Hill Janjatis, mostly Magar and Kumal, are 17% of the population.

Religion in Dang District (2021)
Religion	Percent
Hinduism	95.34%
Christianity	1.77%
Islam	1.06%
Prakriti	0.93%
Buddhism	0.88%
Other or not stated	0.03%

=== Languages ===
Languages of Dang District (2021)
1. Nepali (67.2%)
2. Tharu (25.9%)
3. Magar Dhut (2.14%)
4. Awadhi (2.08%)
5. Magar Kham (1.13%)
6. Others (1.62%)

At the time of the 2021 census, 67.17% of the population spoke Nepali, 25.86% Tharu, 2.14% Magar Dhut, 2.08% Awadhi and 1.13% Magar Kham as their first language. In 2011, 66.7% of the population spoke Nepali as their first language.

== Education ==
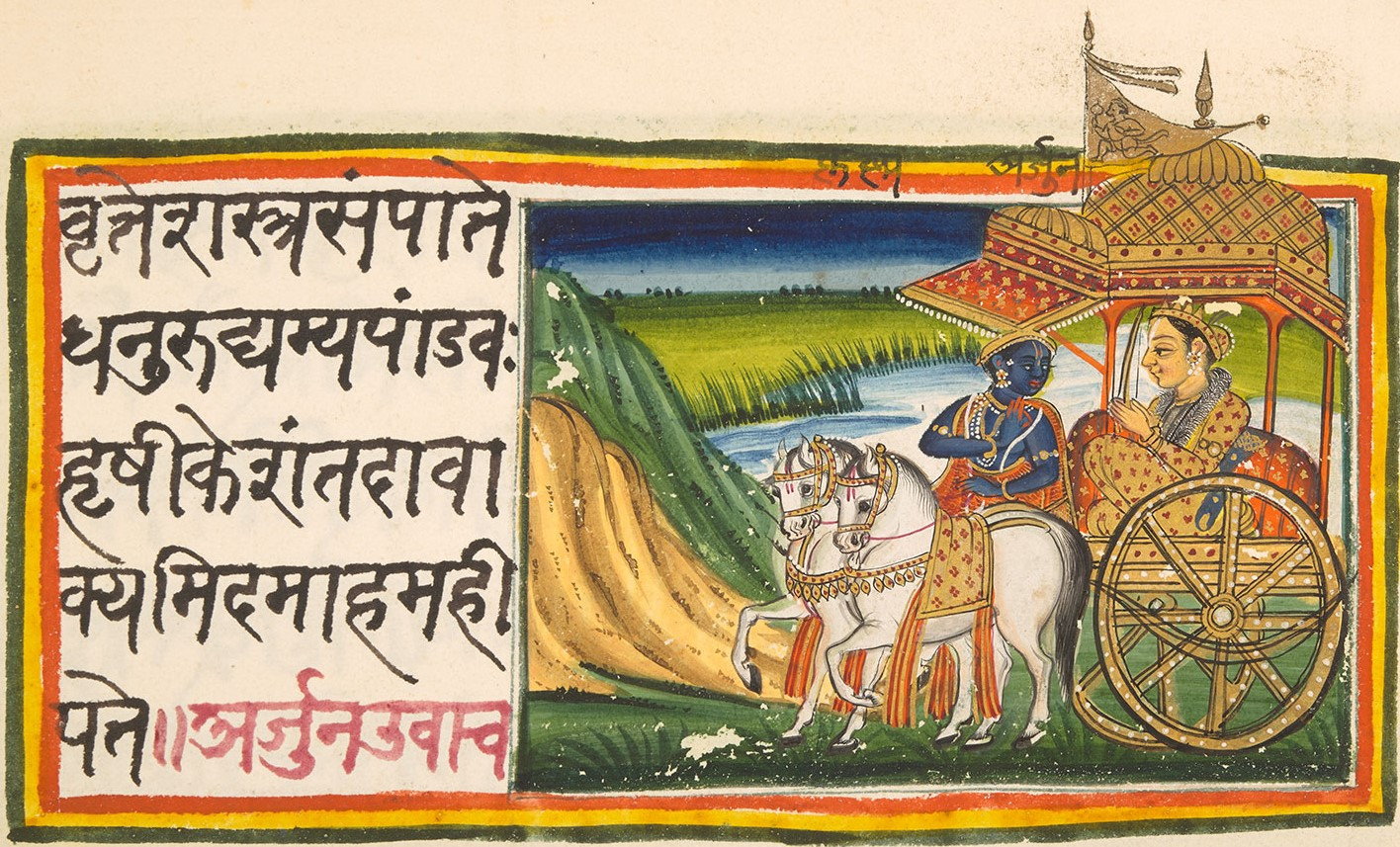
Dang district is considered the center of Sanskrit language education in Nepal

The district, with literacy rate of 81.4%, has become an emerging educational hub of Nepal in recent years and has growing number of schools, child development centers, resource centers and campuses. New initiatives taken by the rural municipalities and sub-metropolitan cities of the district have aimed at improving the quality of the education - most notably - making of the English language medium compulsory. Ghorahi Sub-Metropolitan City has also initiated to make the pre-primary level fully English medium.

Educational Institutes in Dang District
Medium of Education	Unit (Numbers)
Schools	602 (public:424 and private:178)
Child Development Centers	703 (public:117 and private:586)
Campus	31
University	1
Gurkul schools	3
Resource centers	15

Nepal Sanskrit University (formerly Mahendra Sanskrit University)

Nepal Sanskrit University in Dang is Nepal's second-oldest University

Nepal Sanskrit University act was enacted by King Birendra in the advice and consent of Rastriya Panchayat in 1986 "to manage Sanskrit education in Nepal up to the highest mark and to study, research, protect and promote the special achievements received from Sanskrit education in various sectors as per the demand of time and to develop Nepal as a centre of knowledge and inspiration in Sanskrit education upon abiding by the traditional dharma, moral values, propriety and good behavior". As per this, Mahendra Sanskrit University (later renamed Nepal Sanskrit University) was established in Dang which at the time of its commencement was the second university of the country after Tribhuvan University.

Currently, the university offers Intermediate (Uttar Madhyama), Bachelor (Shastri), Bachelor of Education, Masters (Acharya) and Doctoral courses in classical and modern subjects. It offers intermediate in Ayurveda, Bachelors Of Ayurvedic Medicine And Surgery [BAMS] and condensed courses for Ayurvedacharya, as well as yoga training.

Rapti Academy of Health Sciences (RAHS)

Legislature-Parliament unanimously endorsed the ‘Rapti Health Science Academy Bill, 2074’ on 10 October 2017 as per the government's decision to open one state-owned medical college in each province of Nepal. Currently, Rapti Academy of Health Sciences (RAHS) serves as the only state-owned medical college of Lumbini Province with the Prime Minister of Nepal as the Chancellor. In addition to normal medical procedures, the state hold entity is providing Intensive Care Units (ICU), Neonatal Intensive Care Units (NICU) as well as Pediatric Intensive Care Units (PICU).

== Tourism ==
Due to the influence of Hinduism, the valley has numerous temples with legendary connections to Mahābhārata, Shaivism, Shaktism & Gorakhnath making it one of the prominent cultural sites of the country. The district's pilgrimage sites receive increasing number of visitors, both domestic and international, particularly from India. The district's Tharu Cultural Museum is a tourist attraction, and is a national showcase of Tharu art, culture and traditions.

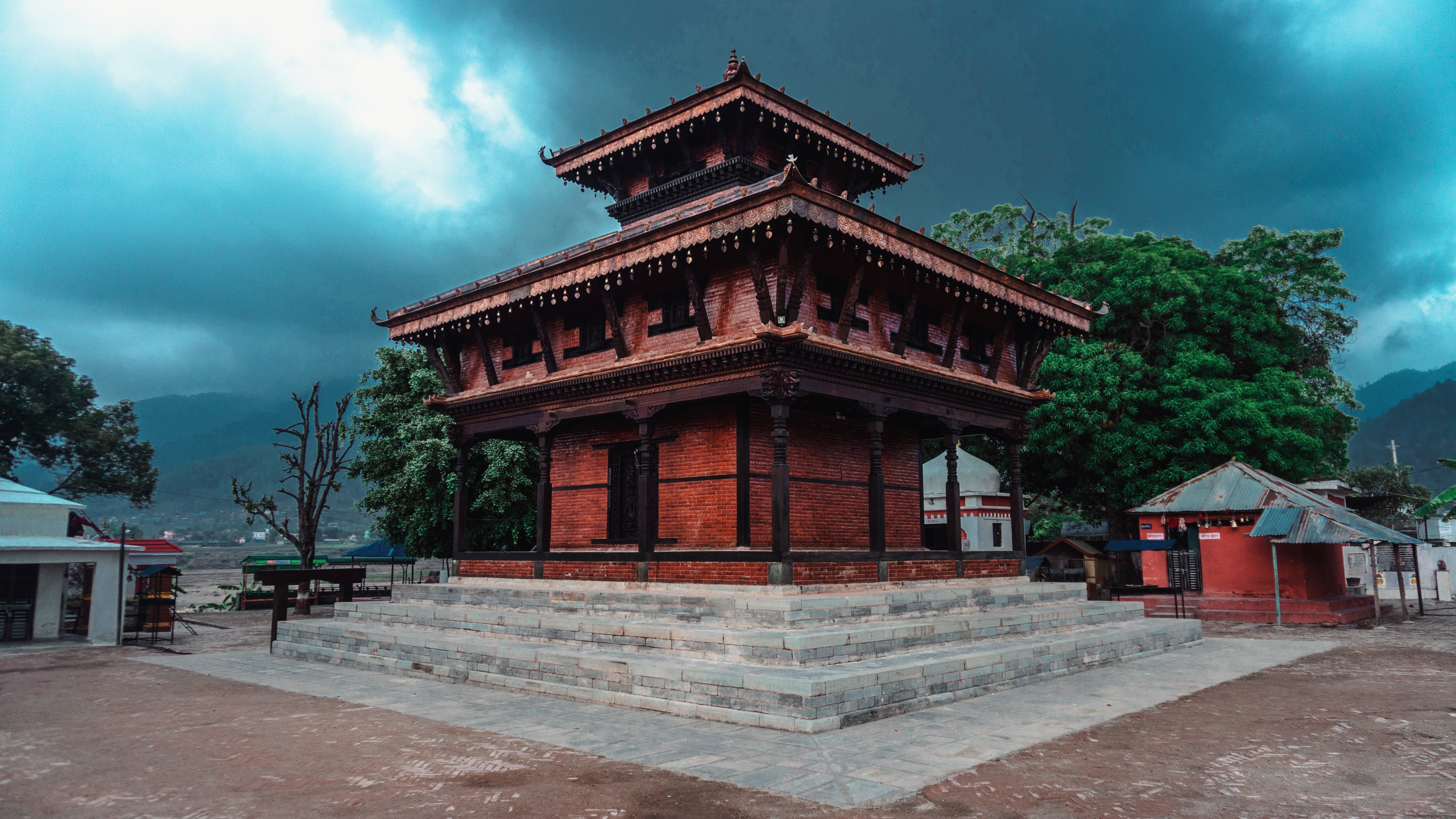
Ambikeshwari Temple is a Shakta pitha in Dang district

Major heritage sites in Dang Deukhuri District include:

=== Cultural Sites ===
Ambikeshwari Temple is one of the spiritually important Hindu temple located in Dang district. The temple also known as ‘Maiko Than’ (Mother's Place) and is situated to the north of Ghorahi 3.5 kilometers away on bank of Katuwa Khola. The temple is also a Shakta pitha, supposed to have emerged due to the falling of right ear of Satidevi according to the Swasthani Purana of Hinduism. This temple is the most popular Shakta pitha of Dang valley.

Ratnanath (Gorakhnath) Mandir, Chaughera is in Chaughera of Ghorahi sub-metropolitan city. It is one of the major tourist and spiritual place of the Dang District. The temple is the namesake of Yogi Ratna Nath, third-in-line of Yogi Gorakhnath. The temple held a strong spiritual importance over the rulers of the valley since older times, even after the change of power to new dynasties as such the internal activities of the temple were almost entirely unaffected for hundreds of years.

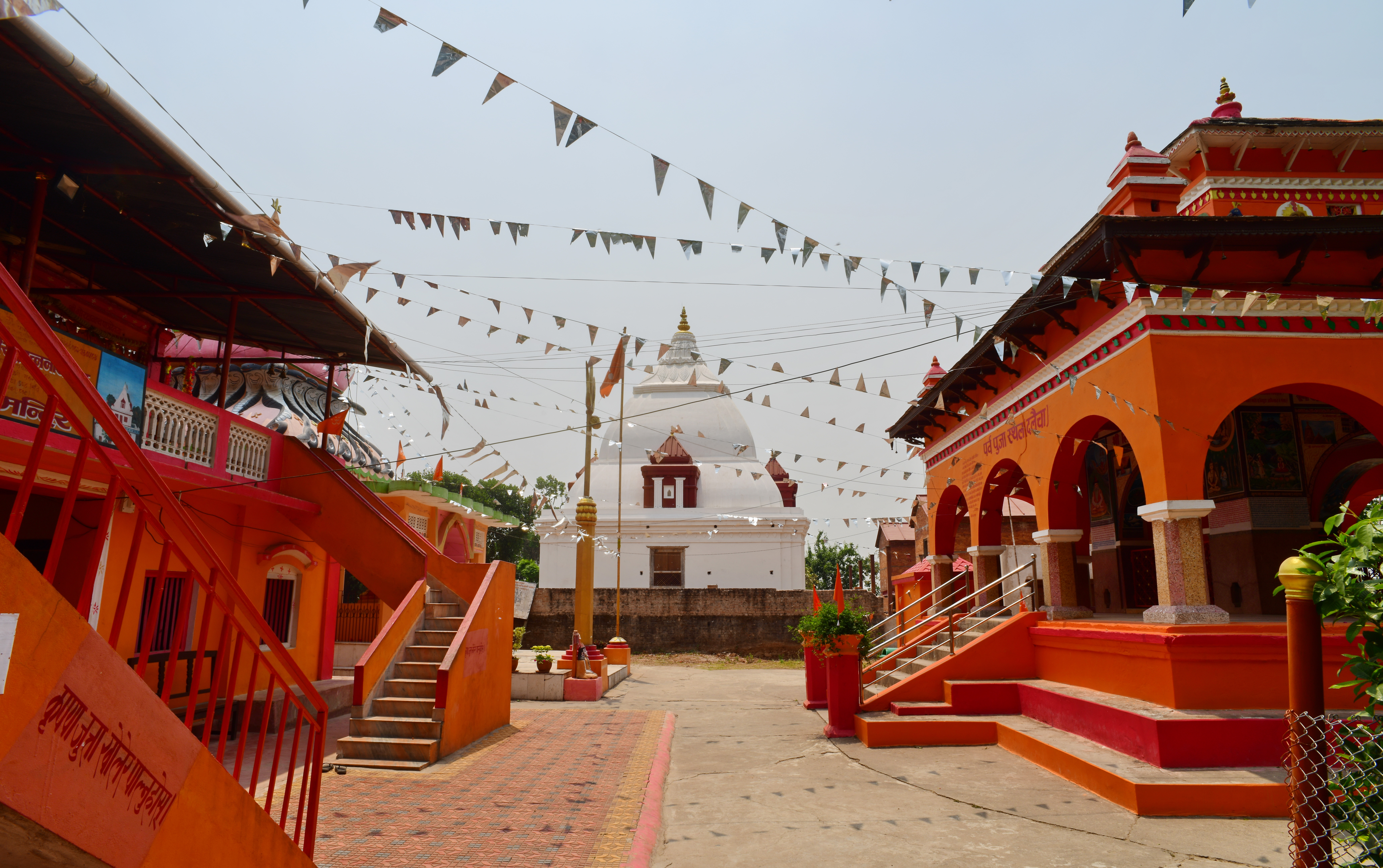
Ratnanath (Gorakhnath Temple) in Chaughera

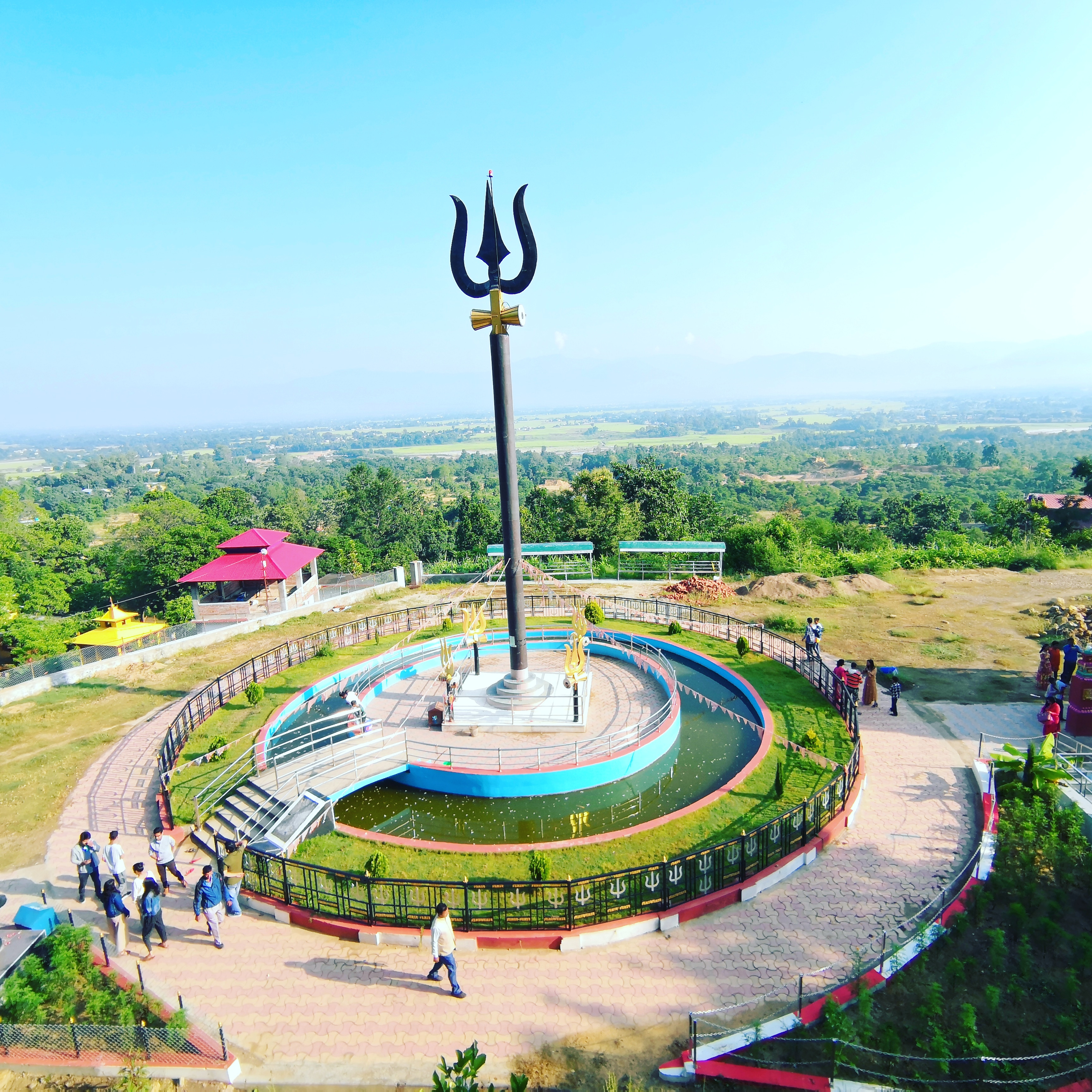
World's largest trident (Trishul) believed to be where five Pandavas brother prayed to Shiva in Dang

The legend of the origin of the monastery is tied to the rulers of the valley, as the narration tells us of a king who went hunting in the jungle where he saw a beautiful deer and shot an arrow. The wounded deer went deep into the forest, and the king followed it. Then suddenly, in the middle of the forest, he met a radiant ascetic, seated in a deep state of meditation with arrow in front of him. The king understood his mistake and apologized. The Siddha forgave him and granted him a boon through yogic power to reign over the Dang Valley. The yogi was Ratannath, the disciple of Yogi Gorakhnath and he took the arrow and gave it to the king, saying "as long as you keep the arrow, you will keep your kingdom firm." The king then started to worship Ratannath, and since then the king's lineage continued the worship and kept the arrow for six months. The other six months the Yogis worshipped the arrow and the king had to give them half of the revenue that he got from his kingdom" (summarized from Narharinath 2022: 516)

Dharapani Temple is situated in the Dharna municipality-01 of the district at the base of chure range, south of Babai river about 9 kilometer drive from the center of Ghorahi. The temple is believed to have been in the ancient site where the five Pandavas brother sat and chanted prayers to Shiva during their journey to Uttarapantha (Himalayas).

The temple has the world's largest Trishula and is one of the major tourist destination of the valley. In recent years, the temple has become an important visiting site for Hindu devotees as well as for prominent personalities such as the President of Nepal, police chiefs, chief justices and ministers.

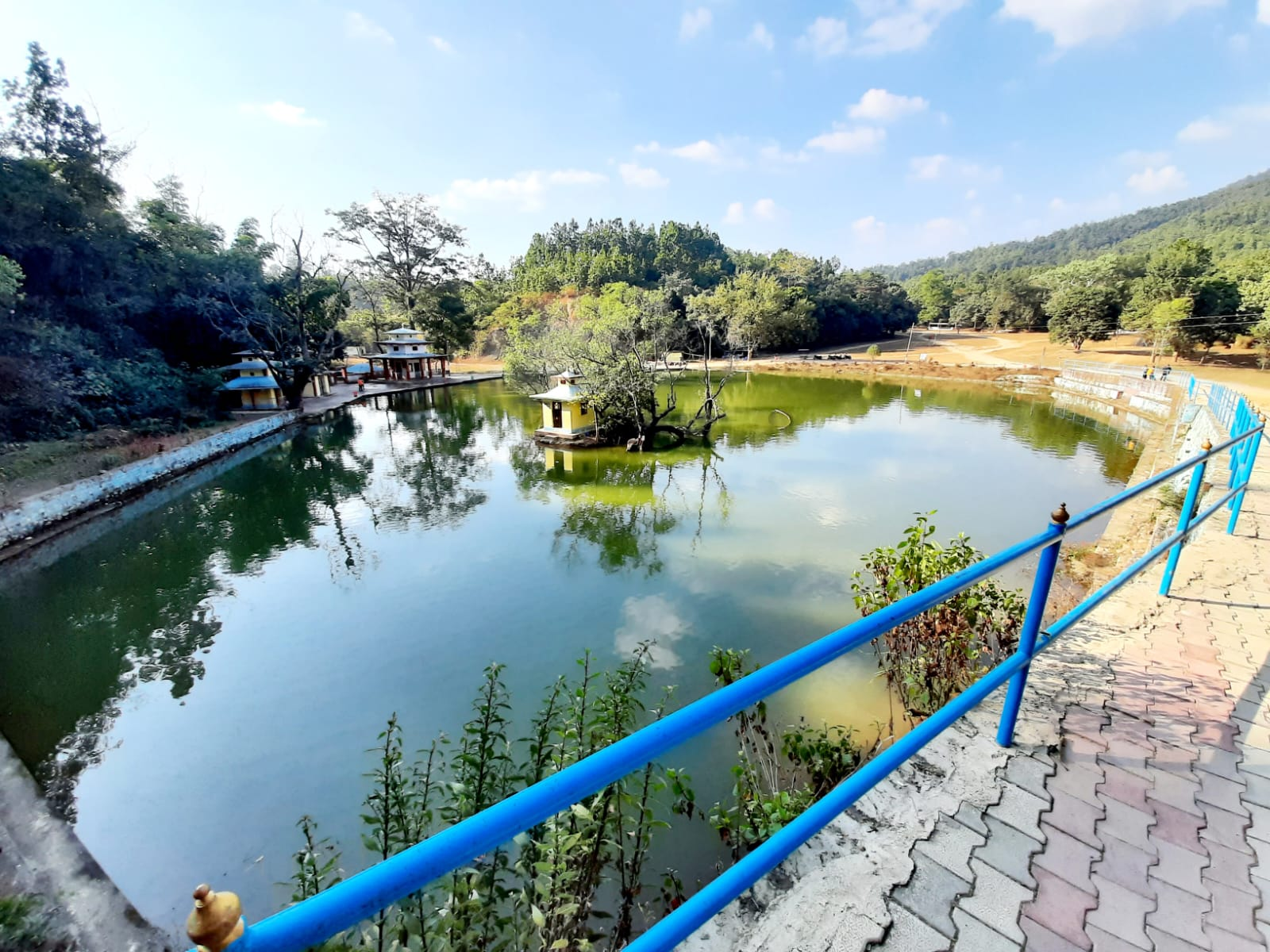
Barhakune Daha in Dang district

Barhakune Daha (Baraha Chhetra), also known as Baraha Chhetra, is situated 3 km North from Ghorahi sub-metropolitan city. The region is dedicated to the Hindu God Vishnu and is widely worshipped during Makar Sankranti festival. The name comes from a pond around the temple which has twelve "bara" (in Nepali) corners.

Chameri cave is situated at the slopes of the Mahabharat range and is also known locally as "Siddha" cave thought to have been used by saints for penance in the valley. There has also been archeological interest in the cave due to the possibility of it being used by pre-historic humans. The cave is 4 storey tall with a spacious ground hall which can accommodate almost a thousand people in its space. Chameri cave holds archeological importance and various preliminary observations are being carried out or further research.

=== Other Prominent Sites ===
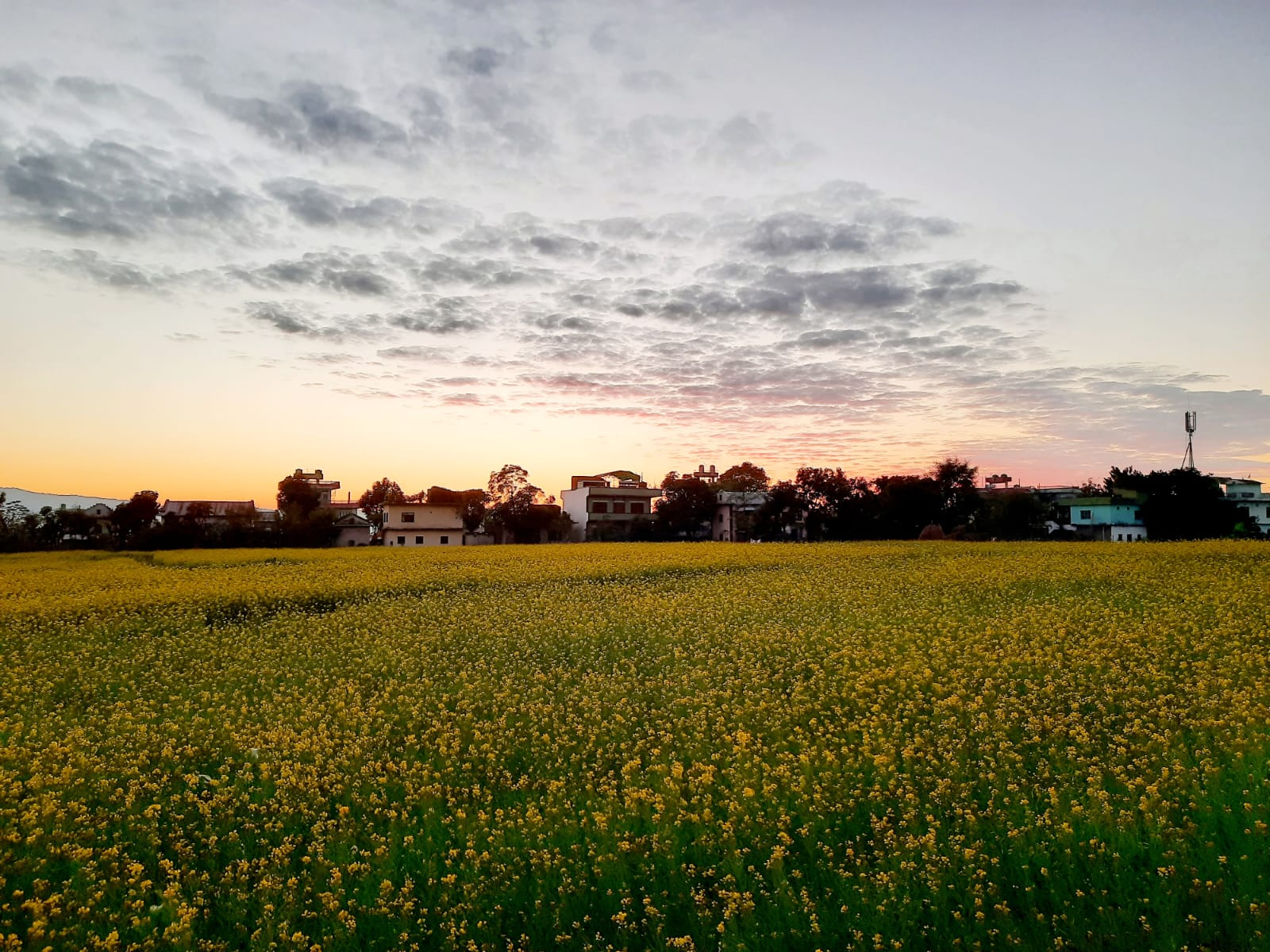
Sunset view of the plains

Jakhera Lake meaning "rain-water collection" is a lake located at Lamai Municipality-5 of Dang, about 35 kilometers far from Ghorahi and two temples dedicated to Ganesh and Siddeswor Mahadev around the lake. The lake is a major tourist attraction in the district and also provides spot for picnic and sight-seeing.

The lake lies in the base of Chure hills and is 6 feet deep with a span of 12 hectares.

Further prominent sites of the valley include:

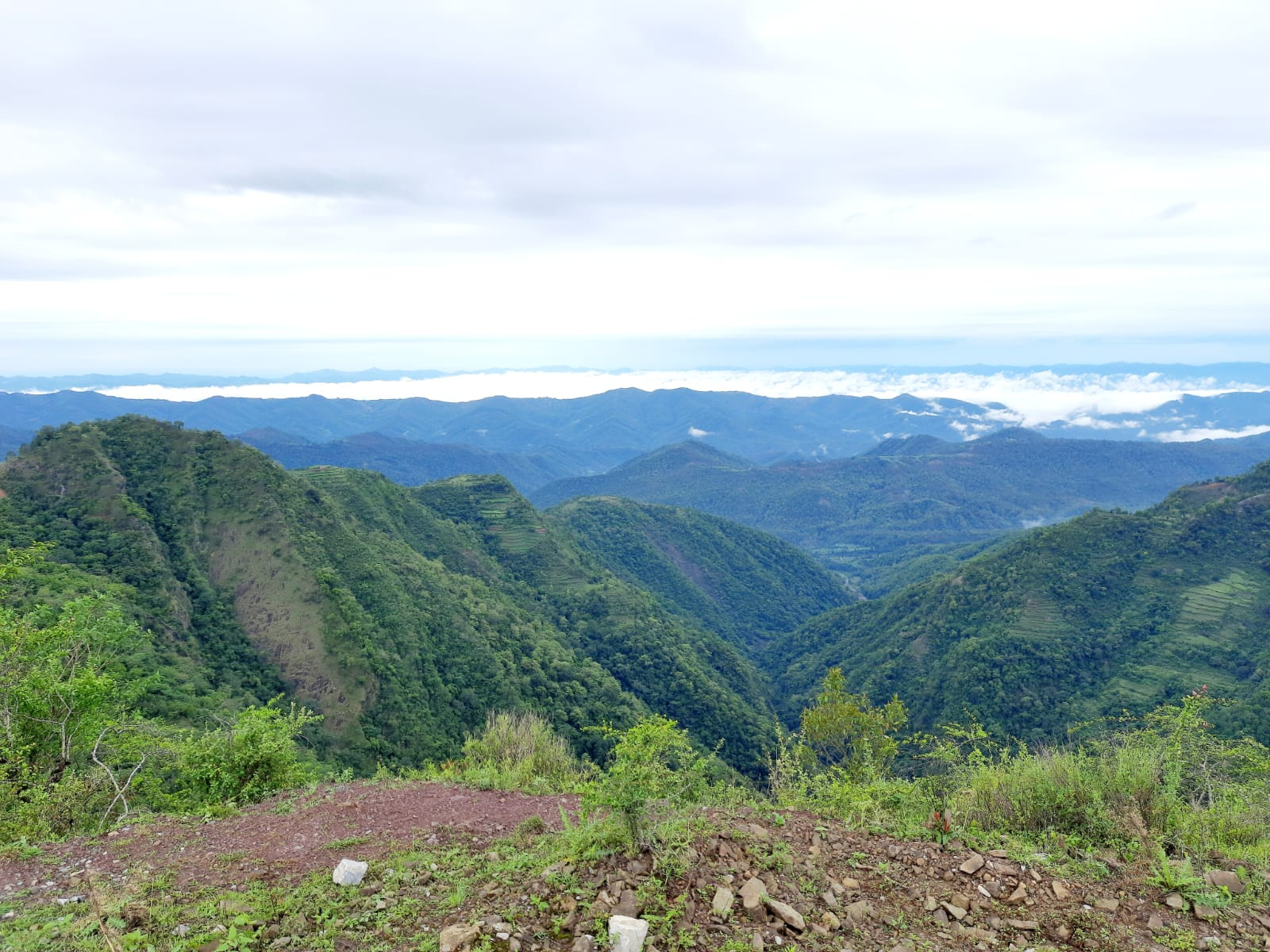
Hills of Dang and Deukhuri valleys

- Sawarikot
- Ghordaura
- Chhilli kot, Chhilli Kot Gupha, Chameri Gupha
- Devikot
- Hanuman Temple
- Kalimai Temple, Kalika Temple
- Kulpani Mandir
- Malika Temple, Mulkot Cave
- Ram Janaki Temple
- Sirasthan, Srigaun Temple, Sukaura Mound
- Bagar Baba mandir, Rihar
- Taptakunda Shivalaya, Mamisauri mandir, Rihar
- Shiva Mandir, Dhankhola
- Shiva Cave, Dhankhola
- Mata Malmala Devi, Malmala, Gadawa-1
- Tuhi valley
- Suikot Temple
- Devisthan Mandir [Pawannagar, Bhamake]
- Kalika mandir
- Jakhera Tal Temple

== Transportation ==
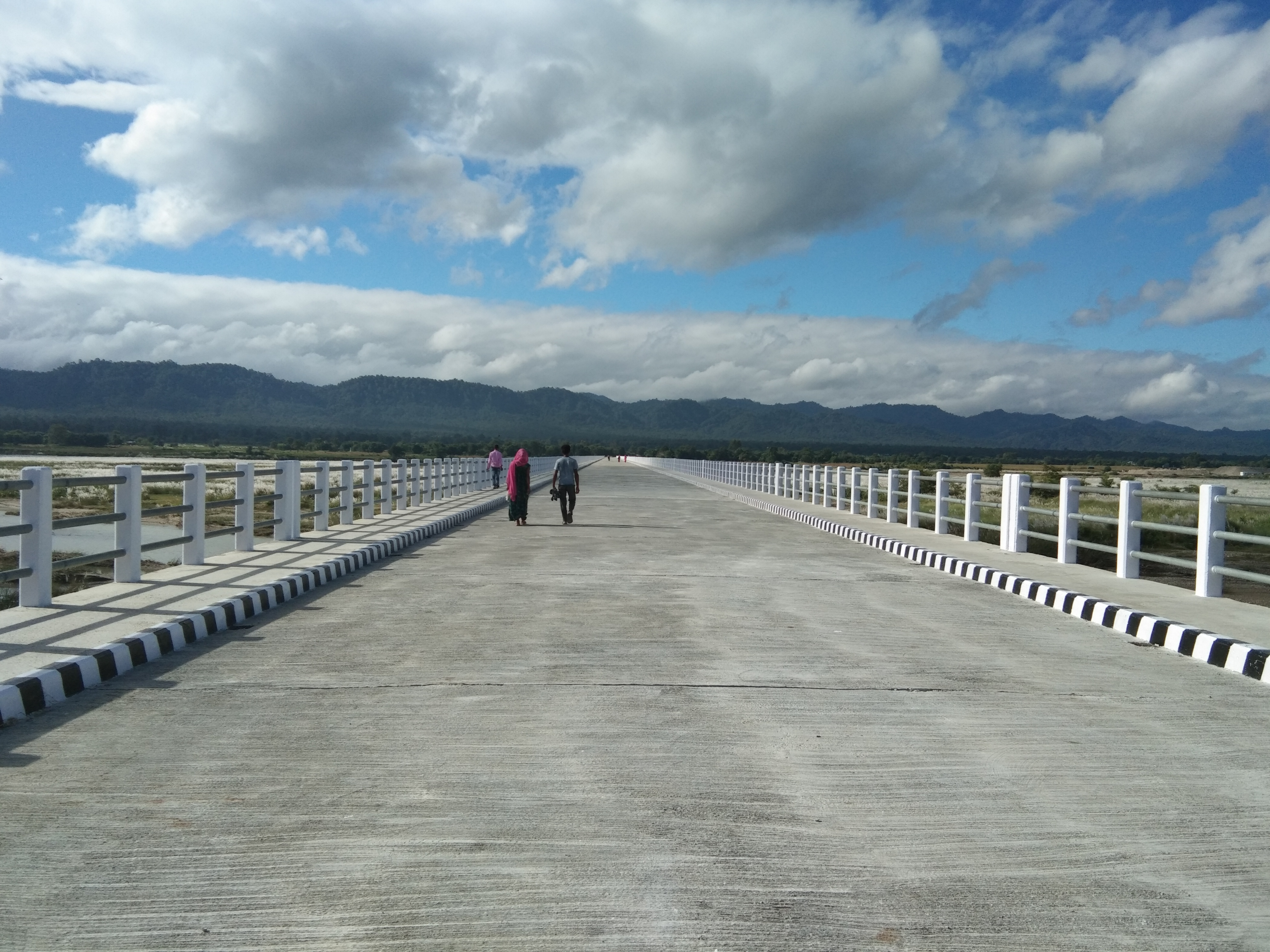
Nepal's second longest bridge, Rapti bridge, in Dang district

East West Highway —the main east–west highway across Nepal— follows Deukhuri Valley, passing Kalakate and Bhalubang bazar at the upper end and Lamahi downstream. From Bhalubang, branch roads lead up the Rapti River into Pyuthan and Rolpa Districts. From Lamahi there are roads north across the Dang Range to Ghorahi, and south over the Dudhwas to Koilabas, which used to be an international trade centre earlier. The East West highway which passes through the Lamahi joints the Banke district leading Kohalpur. Roads from Ghorahi lead to Rolpa district and the Swargadwari pilgrimage site. From Tulsipur a motorable road goes north into Salyan District. Nepal's second-longest bridge over Rapti river in Dang district connects Sisahaniya of Rapti Rural Municipality with Mahadeva of Gadawa Rural Municipality in the district.

At Tarigaun, Dang Airport (IATA: DNP, ICAO: VNDG) has daily scheduled connection to Kathmandu in Nepal.

Airlines	Destinations	Refs.
Nepal Airlines	Kathmandu	

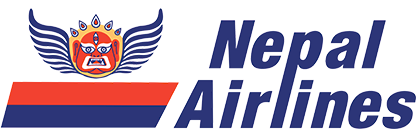
Nepal Airlines serves Dang district with daily operation

== Dang International Cricket Stadium ==
Dang International Cricket Stadium (Nepali: दाङ अन्तर्राष्ट्रिय क्रीकेट मैदान), also known as Ghorahi Int'l Cricket Ground, is a proposed International Cricket Stadium. It is located in Dang Valley, Ghorahi, Dang. This stadium will be one of the biggest cricket stadiums in Nepal. The capacity of the stadium will be over 30,000 spectators. It is the home ground of Lumbini Lions in Nepal Premier League. Additionally, the stadium is also the home ground of Lumbini Province cricket team and Lumbini Province women's cricket team.

Ghorahi Cricket Ground has been hosting under-16 and under-19 provincial-level tournaments. It has also hosted the Dang Cricket League twice and the Sagarmatha T20 League one time. The Ghorahi Cricket Stadium in Ghorahi Sub-Metropolitan City does not have as much infrastructure as the stadium in Lamahi, but Ghorahi has a good ground capable of hosting big national tournaments.

== Notable People from Dang ==
- Sunil Thapa, late legendary Nepalese and Bollywood actor
- Paul Shah, Nepalese film actor
- Niti Shah, Nepalese film actress and former Miss Nepal International
- Komal Oli, prominent Nepalese singer and newscaster
- Arun Chhetri, Nepalese actor
- Amar Oli, Nepalese movie director
- Saya Bhandari, Nepalese actress
- Bhumika Giri, Nepalese singer
- Ankit Babu Adhikari, Nepalese singer
- Santosh Shrestha, Nepalese music director and singer
- Pravan Bhusal, Nepalese actor
- Nitin Chand, Nepalese movie director
- Akash Budha Magar, national footballer of Nepal national team
- Hira Chandra KC, Nepalese politician and former Minister of Health and Population
- Shankar Pokhrel, Nepalese politician, General Secretary of CPN-UML, former Minister of Information and Communications of Nepal and Chief Minister of Lumbini Province
- Bipin Acharya, Nepalese politician and General Secretary of Rastriya Swatantra Party
- Khum Bahadur Khadka, Nepalese politician and late Minister of the Home Affairs of Nepal
- Metmani Chaudhary, Nepalese politician and former Minister of Urban Development
- Dilli Bahadur Chaudhary, Nepalese politician and former Chief Minister of Lumbini Province
- Rekha Sharma, Nepalese politician and former Minister of Communication and ICT of Nepal
- Parshu Narayan Chaudhary, late Minister of Education of Nepal
- Deepak Giri, Nepalese politician and former Minister of Irrigation of Nepal
- Krishna Bahadur Mahara, former Minister of Home Affairs (Nepal) and Minister of Information and Communications
- Shanta Chaudhary, social reformer and member of Constituent Assembly of Nepal
- Damodar Chaudhary, Nepalese politician and former member of Constituent Assembly of Nepal
- Raju Khanal, Nepalese politician and former member of Constituent Assembly of Nepal
- Shiv Raj Gautam, Nepalese politician and former member of Constituent Assembly of Nepal
- Krishna Kishor Ghimire, Nepalese politician and former Member of Parliament of Nepal
- Sushila Chaudhary, Nepalese politician and former member of Nepalese Constituent Assembly
- Kamal Subedi, Nepalese politician and former Member of Parliament
- Indrajit Tharu, Nepalese politician and former member of Constituent Assembly
- Prakash Aryal, 26th Inspector General of Nepal Police
- Bhupendra Budhathoki, Nepalese songwriter
- Amar Giri, Nepalese poet
- Gyani Maiya Sen-Kusunda, prominent late Kusunda community elder
- Kamala Sen-Khatri, Nepalese language activist
- Buddhiram Bhandari, Nepalese politician

== Maps ==
- Ministry of Federal Affairs and Local Development has downloadable district maps based on a detailed and comprehensive GIS database:
1. VDC boundaries
2. Land use
3. Rivers, streams, ponds
4. Motor roads and foot trails
- Besides the United Nations/Nepal map of districts and VDCs shown above, their Map Centre has a downloadable PDF version adding municipalities, roads and water detail.
- From 1992 to 2002 a definitive series of large scale topographic maps were surveyed and published through a joint project by Government of Nepal Survey Department and Finland's Ministry for Foreign Affairs contracting through the FinnMap consulting firm. Japan International Cooperation Agency substituted for FinnMap mainly in Lumbini Zone with one sheet showing the easternmost part of Dang-Deukhuri.

Topographic sheets at 1:25,000 scale covering 7.5 minutes latitude and longitude map the Terai and Middle Mountains including all of this district. JPG scans can be downloaded here: These sheets cover Dang Deukhuri District:

1. 2782 1B Amiliya (2005)
2. 2782 1D Sunpathari Naka (1997)
3. 2782 2A Rihar (1998)
4. 2782 2B Satbariya (1998)
5. 2782 2C, 6A Jangrahawa Mahatiniya (1998)
6. 2782 2D Bela (1998)
7. 2782 3A Atthaise (1998)
8. 2782 3B Hasipur (1998)
9. 2782 3C Lamahi (2005)
10. 2782 3D Lalmatiya (2005)
11. 2782 4A Bangesal (1997)
12. 2782 4C Bhaluban (1997)
13. 2782 6B Siriya Naka (1998)
14. 2782 7A Koilabas (2005)
15. 2782 7B Jawabairath (1999)
16. 2882 9D Shitalpati (1998)
17. 2882 13A Hamsapur (1998)
18. 2882 13B Panchakule (1998)
19. 2882 13C Bairiya Kusum (2005)
20. 2882 13D Hekuli (1998)
21. 2882 14A Tulsipur (1999)
22. 2882 14B Dubrin (1999)
23. 2882 14C Bijauri (1999)
24. 2882 14D Ghorahi (1998)
25. 2882 15A Holeri (1999)
26. 2882 15C Bach Pokhara (1998)
27. 2882 15D Swargadwari (1999)
28. (JICA) 097-11 Shiwagadhi (1993)

== See also ==
- Dang Cricket League
