= 2nd Lumbini Provincial Assembly =

←	1st Assembly

Overview
- Legislative body: Lumbini Provincial Assembly
- Jurisdiction: Lumbini Province, Nepal
- Meeting place: Chamber of Commerce Meeting Hall, Bhalubang, Dang District
- Term: 2 January 2023 –
- Election: 2022 provincial elections
- Government: Giri cabinet, 2023

Provincial Assembly
- Members: 87
- Speaker: Tularam Gharti Magar, CPN (MC)
- Deputy Speaker: Menuka Khand K.C., RPP
- Chief Minister: Chet Narayan Acharya, CPN (UML)
- Leader of the Opposition: Jokh Bahadur Mahara, CPN (MC)
- Party control: Government (64): CPN (UML): 29; Congress: 27; Janamat: 3; PSP: 2; LSPN: 2; PSP-N: 1; Opposition (19): NCP: 13; RPP: 4; RJM: 1; Independent: 1; Vacant (4)

The second Lumbini Provincial Assembly was elected by the 2022 provincial elections on 20 November 2022. 87 members were elected to the assembly, 52 of whom were elected through direct elections and 35 of whom were elected through the party list proportional representation system. The first session of the assembly commenced from 2 January 2023.

== Leaders ==
=== Officers ===
- Speaker of the Lumbini Provincial Assembly: Hon. Tularam Gharti Magar, (CPN (Maoist Centre))
- Deputy Speaker of the Lumbini Provincial Assembly: Hon. Menuka Khand K.C., (Rastriya Prajatantra Party)
- Leader of the House in the Lumbini Provincial Assembly (Chief Minister):
  - Hon. Leela Giri, (CPN (UML)) (until 27 April 2023)
  - Hon. Dilli Bahadur Chaudhary, (Nepali Congress) (until 4 April 2024)
  - Hon. Jokh Bahadur Mahara, (CPN (Maoist Centre)) (until 23 July 2024)
  - Hon. Chet Narayan Acharya, (CPN (UML)) (from 24 July 2024)
- Leader of the Opposition in the Lumbini Provincial Assembly:
  - Hon. Dilli Bahadur Chaudhary, (Nepali Congress) (until 12 January 2023 – 27 April 2023; 5 April 2024 – 23 July 2024)
  - Hon. Leela Giri, (CPN (UML)) (until 4 April 2024)
  - Hon. Jokh Bahadur Mahara, (CPN (Maoist Centre)) (from 24 July 2024)

=== Parliamentary party ===
- Parliamentary party leader of CPN (UML): Hon. Leela Giri
  - Deputy parliamentary party leader of CPN (UML): Hon. Chet Narayan Acharya
- Parliamentary party leader of Nepali Congress: Hon. Dilli Bahadur Chaudhary
- Parliamentary party leader of CPN (Maoist Centre): Hon. Jokh Bahadur Mahara
- Parliamentary party leader of Rastriya Prajatantra Party: Hon. Ashish Kumar Chaudhary
- Parliamentary party leader of Nagrik Unmukti Party: Hon. Dharma Bahadur Chaudhary
- Parliamentary party leader of Loktantrik Samajwadi Party: Hon. Santosh Kumar Pandey

=== Whips ===
- Chief Whip of Nagrik Unmukti Party: Hon. Raj Kumar Chaudhary
  - Whip of Nagrik Unmukti Party: Hon. Naramaya Dhakal

== Composition ==

Party	Seats					
Party	After election			At present		
Party	FPTP	PR	Total	FPTP	PR	Total
CPN (UML)	18	11	29	18	11	29
Congress	17	10	27	17	10	27
NCP	—	—	—	6	7	13
RPP	2	2	4	2	2	4
Janamat	1	2	3	1	2	3
Loktantrik Samajwadi	2	1	3	1	1	2
PSP	—	—	—	2	—	2
PSP-Nepal	2	1	3	0	1	1
Janamorcha	0	1	1	0	1	1
Independent	3	—	3	1	—	1
Vacant	—	—	—	4	—	4
Former Parties
Unified Socialist	0	1	1	0	1	1
Maoist Centre	5	4	9	7	4	11
Nagarik Unmukti Party	2	2	4	1	2	3
Total	52	35	87	52	35	87

== Members ==
CPN (UML) (29)
Constituency/PR group	Member	Portfolio & Responsibilities
Rupandehi 2 (A)	Lila Giri	Chief Minister; Parliamentary party leader; Leader of the Opposition
Arghakhanchi 1 (A)	Chet Narayan Acharya	Deputy parliamentary party leader; Cabinet minister; Parliamentary party leader; Chief Minister
Gulmi 1 (A)	Chindramani Pandey	
Gulmi 2 (A)	Dilliraj Bhusal	
Gulmi 2 (B)	Dinesh Panthi	
Palpa 1 (A)	Raju Prasad Shrestha	
Palpa 1 (B)	Khem Bahadur Saru	
Arghakhanchi 1 (B)	Ramji Prasad Ghimire	
Rupandehi 2 (B)	Bhoj Prasad Shrestha	
Rupandehi 3 (B)	Tulsi Prasad Chaudhary	
Rupandehi 5 (A)	Bhumeshwar Dhakal	
Kapilvastu 1 (A)	Binu Prasad Panthi	
Kapilvastu 1 (B)	Madhusudan Sharan Kurmi	
Kapilvastu 2 (A)	Nawaraj Lamichhane	
Kapilvastu 3 (A)	Arjun Kumar K.C.	
Pyuthan 1 (A)	Tulsi Ram Sharma	
Banke 1 (B)	Durga Prasad Chaudhary	
Banke 3 (A)	Ratna Bahadur Khatri	
Khas Arya	Girdharilal Neupane	
Khas Arya	Janak Neupane	
Khas Arya	Basanti Neupane	
Indigenous peoples	Yamuna Roka Tamang	
Indigenous peoples	Rewati Gurung	
Tharu	Sita Sharma	
Tharu	Bhagwati Kumari Tharuni	
Dalit	Indra Kumari Gahatraj	
Dalit	Rekha Kumar Sharma	
Madheshi, Lodh	Santhi Lodh	
Muslim	Sayara Bano	
Former Members
Indigenous peoples	Sarita Pun	

Nepali Congress (27)
Constituency/PR group	Member	Portfolio & Responsibilities
Dang 3 (A)	Dilli Bahadur Chaudhary	Leader of the Opposition; Parliamentary party leader
Gulmi 1 (B)	Dhanendra Karki	
Palpa 2 (A)	Bir Bahadur Rana	
Rupandehi 1 (B)	Abdul Razak Gaddi	
Rupandehi 4 (B)	Basiuddin Khan	
Kapilvastu 2 (B)	Sudhakar Panday	
Eastern Rukum 1 (B)	Dhan Bahadur K.C.	
Pyuthan 1 (B)	Saroj Thapa	
Dang 1 (B)	Anurag Khadka	
Dang 2 (A)	Raju Khanal	
Dang 2 (B)	Prachanda Bikram Neupane	
Banke 3 (B)	Badshah Kurmi	
Bardiya 1 (A)	Bhubaneshwar Chaudhary	
Bardiya 2 (A)	Janmaya Timilsina	
Parasi 1 (A)	Biswo Prem Pathak	
Parasi 1 (B)	Devkaran Prasad Kalwar	
Parasi 2 (B)	Baijanath Kalwar	
Khas Arya	Jamuna Dhakal	
Khas Arya	Nima Giri	
Khas Arya	Malati Sodari	
Indigenous peoples	Dhanlaxmi Shrestha	
Indigenous peoples	Maya Pun	
Tharu	Devi Prasad Chaudhary	
Tharu	Sanju Kumari Caudhary	
Dalit	Loki Kumar Bishwakarma	
Madheshi, Badi	Shushila Badi	
Muslim	Mina Kumari Bohara	

Nepali Communist Party (13)
Constituency/PR group	Member	Portfolio & Responsibilities
Palpa 2 (B)	Tularam Gharti Magar (Note: Elected from Maoist Centre)	Speaker of the Assembly
Rolpa 1 (A)	Jokh Bahadur Mahara	Parliamentary party leader; Leader of the Opposition
Eastern Rukum 1 (A)	Surul Pun	Elected as Independent
Dang 1 (A)	Indrajit Tharu	
Rolpa 1 (B)	Dipendra Kumar Pun	Elected as Independent
Khas Arya	Mina Budhamagar	
Indigenous peoples	Dil Kumari Budha	
Tharu	Krishna Kushma Tharu	
Dalit	Yam Bahadur Nepali Sarki	
Khas Arya	Bhagwati Adhikari (Note: Elected from Unified Socialist)	
Bardiya 1 (B)	Raj Kumar Chaudhary (Note: Elected from Nagarik Unmukti)	
Khas Arya	Narmaya Dhakal	
Indigenous peoples	Nirmala Devi Tharu	
Former Members
Dang 3 (B)	Dhan Bahadur Maski	
Banke 1 (A)	Krishna K.C.	

Rastriya Prajatantra Party (4)
Constituency/PR group	Member	Portfolio & Responsibilities
Khas Arya	Menuka Khand K.C.	Deputy Speaker of the assembly
Rupandehi 1 (A)	Aashish Kumar Chaudhary	Parliamentary party leader
Kapilvastu 3 (B)	Janaki Prasad Yadav	
Indigenous peoples	Mina Kimari Shrestha	

Janamat Party (3)
Constituency/PR group	Member	Portfolio & Responsibilities
Rupandehi 5 (B)	Chandrakesh Gupta	
Khas Arya	Suman Sharma Rayamajhi	
Indigenous peoples	Neelam Paswan	
Former Members
Indigenous peoples	Gita Gurung	

Loktantrik Samajwadi Party (3)
Constituency/PR group	Member	Portfolio & Responsibilities
Rupandehi 3 (A)	Santosh Kumar Panday	Parliamentary party leader
Khas Arya	Hema Belbase	
Former Members
Rupandehi 4 (A)	Kanhaiya Baniya	

People's Socialist Party (2)
Constituency/PR group	Member	Portfolio & Responsibilities
Banke 2 (A)	Bhandari Lal Ahir	
Banke 2 (B)	Aadesh Kumar Agrawal	

People's Socialist Party, Nepal (1)
Constituency/PR group	Member	Portfolio & Responsibilities
Khas Arya	Ambika Kafle	

Rastriya Janamorcha (1)
Constituency/PR group	Member	Portfolio & Responsibilities
Khas Arya	Tara Thapa	

Independent (1)
Constituency/PR group	Member	Portfolio & Responsibilities
Parasi 2 (A)	Khadga Basnet	

Nagrik Unmukti Party (0)
Constituency/PR group	Member	Portfolio & Responsibilities
Former Members
Bardiya 2 (B)	Dharma Bahadur Chaudhary	Parliamentary party leader

=== Changes ===
Constituency/PR group	MPA	Party	Date seat vacated	Cause of vacation	New MPA	Party
Indigenous peoples	Gita Gurung	Janamat	28 May 2025	Dismissed	Neelam Paswan	Janamat
Indigenous peoples	Sarita Pun	CPN (UML)	31 August 2025	Death	Rewati Gurung	CPN (UML)
Rupandehi 4 (A)	Kanhaiya Baniya	Loktantrik Samajwadi	19 January 2026	Resigned to contest general election		
Bardiya 2 (B)	Dharma Bahadur Chaudhary	Nagarik Unmukti Party	19 January 2026	Resigned to contest general election		
Dang 3 (B)	Dhan Bahadur Maski	NCP	19 January 2026	Resigned to contest general election		
Banke 1 (A)	Krishna K.C.	NCP	19 January 2026	Resigned to contest general election		

=== Defections ===
Constituency/PR group	Member	From	To	Date
Rolpa 1 (B)	Dipendra Kumar Pun	Independent	Maoist Centre	4 January 2023
Eastern Rukum 1 (A)	Surul Pun	Independent	Maoist Centre	22 March 2023
Banke 2 (A)	Bhandari Lal Ahir	PSP-Nepal	PSP	12 May 2024
Banke 2 (B)	Aadesh Kumar Agrawal	PSP-Nepal	PSP	12 May 2024
