= Rupandehi 3 =

Parliamentary constituency in Lumbini Province, Nepal

- Parliamentary constituency
- Rupandehi 3 in Lumbini Province
- Province: Lumbini Province
- District: Rupandehi District
- Electorate: 140,035
- Major settlements: Siddharthanagar (Bhairahawa); Butwal (partial); Tilottama (Manigram–Shankarnagar)

Current constituency
- Created: 1991
- Party: Rastriya Swatantra Party
- Member of Parliament: Lekhjung Thapa
- Member of the Provincial Assembly 3(A): Santosh Kumar Pandey, Loktantrik Samajwadi
- Member of the Provincial Assembly 3(B): Tulasi Prasad Chaudhary, CPN (UML)

Rupandehi 3 is one of three parliamentary constituencies of the Rupandehi District in Nepal. This constituency came into existence from the Constituency Delimitation Commission(CDC) report submitted on 31 August 2017.

== Incorporated areas ==
Rupandehi 3 incorporates Sudhdhodhan Rural Municipality, Sidhhartanagar Municipality, wards 1 to 3, 6 and 7 of Siyari Rural Municipality, ward 2 of Omasatiya Rural Municipality, wards 7 and 8 of Mayadevi Rural Municipality, wards 13 and 14 of Tilottama Municipality and wards 14 to 19 of Butwal Sub-metropolitan City.

== Assembly segments ==
It encompasses the following Lumbini Provincial Assembly segments.

- Rupandehi 3(A)
- Rupandehi 3(B)

== Members of Parliament ==
=== Parliament/Constituent Assembly ===
Election	Member	Party
1991	Bal Krishna Khand	Nepali Congress
1994	Mod Nath Prasrit	CPN (Unified Marxist–Leninist)
1999	Surya Prasad Pradhan	Nepali Congress
2008	Bal Krishna Khand	Nepali Congress
2017	Ghanashyam Bhusal	CPN (Unified Marxist–Leninist)
May 2018	Ghanashyam Bhusal	Nepal Communist Party
March 2021	Ghanashyam Bhusal	CPN (Unified Marxist–Leninist)
2022	Deepak Bohara	Rastriya Prajatantra Party
2026	Dr. Lekhjung Thapa	Rastriya Swatantra Party

=== Provincial Assembly ===
==== 3(A) ====
Election	Member	Party
2017	Santosh Kumar Pandeya	Federal Socialist Forum, Nepal
May 2019	Santosh Kumar Pandeya	Samajbadi Party, Nepal
April 2020	Santosh Kumar Pandeya	People's Socialist Party, Nepal
2022	Santosh Kumar Pandeya	Loktantrik Samajwadi Party, Nepal

==== 3(B) ====
Election	Member	Party
2017	Tulsi Prasad Chaudhary	CPN (Unified Marxist-Leninist)
May 2018	Tulsi Prasad Chaudhary	Nepal Communist Party
2022	Tulsi Prasad Chaudhary	Communist Party of Nepal (Unified Marxist–Leninist)

== Election results ==
=== Election in the 2020s ===
==== 2026 general election ====
Candidate	Party	Votes	%
Dr. Lekh Jung Thapa	Rastriya Swatantra Party	58,814	65.78
Sushil Gurung	Nepali Congress	8,435	9.43
Basudev Ghimire	Communist Party of Nepal (Unified Marxist–Leninist)	8,275	9.26
Gaurab Bohara	Rastriya Prajatantra Party	7,789	8.71
Faiz Ahmad Kha	Nepali Communist Party	2,594	2.90
Nanda Kumari Thapa	Nagrik Unmukti Party	750	0.84
Jit Bahadur Gupta	Independent	601	0.67
Bishal Gupta	Janamat Party	429	0.48
Mojib Ali Musalman	Rastriya Janamukti Party	417	0.47
Saroj Singh Chaudhary	Ujyaalo Nepal Party	206	0.23
Others		1,095	1.22
Total		89,405	100.00
Registered voters/turnout		140,035	–
Majority		50,379	
Rastriya Swatantra Party gain			

==== 2022 general election ====
Candidate	Party	Votes	%
Deepak Bohara	Rastriya Prajatantra Party	36,717	41.62
Bal Krishna Khand	Nepali Congress	34,036	38.58
Jeet Bahadur Gupta Teli	Rastriya Swatantra Party	5,796	6.57
Tulsi Prasad Tharu	Nagrik Unmukti Party	4,751	5.39
Pramod Kumar Raut	Janamat Party	3,317	3.76
Prakhyat Banjade	Hamro Nepali Party	1,384	1.57
Keshav Bikram Khadka	Independent	1,056	1.20
Others		1,155	1.31
Total		88,212	100.00
Majority		2,681	
Rastriya Prajatantra Party			

=== Election in the 2010s ===
==== 2017 legislative elections ====
Party	Candidate	Votes
CPN (Unified Marxist–Leninist)	Ghanshyam Bhusal	32,866
Rastriya Prajatantra Party (Democratic)	Deepak Bohora	27,422
Federal Socialist Forum, Nepal	Mahendra Yadav	12,536
Rastriya Janamukti Party	Surya Kumar Saru Magar	2,409
Unified Rastriya Prajatantra Party (Nationalist)	Kamal Prasad Sharma Upadhyaya	1,856
Others		2,894
Invalid votes		4,063
Result	CPN (UML) gain	
Source: Election Commission

==== 2017 Nepalese provincial elections ====
===== 3(A) =====
Party	Candidate	Votes
Federal Socialist Forum, Nepal	Santosh Kumar Pandey	11,477
Nepali Congress	Devi Prasad Chaudhary	10,328
CPN (Maoist Centre)	Bishwas Baral	9,837
Independent	Om Kumar Shrestha	2,394
Rastriya Janamukti Party	Rekha Prasad Chaudhary	1,795
Bibeksheel Sajha Party	Amit Kumar Gupta	1,133
Others		1,850
Invalid votes		1,851
Result	CPN (UML) gain	
Source: Election Commission

===== 3(B) =====
Party	Candidate	Votes
CPN (Unified Marxist–Leninist)	Tulsi Prasad Chaudhary	18,615
Nepali Congress	Hari Dhoj Malla	16,793
Federal Socialist Forum, Nepal	Ashook Kumar Verma	3,577
Rastriya Janamukti Party	Chiktra Prasad Gurung	1,058
Others		1,754
Invalid votes		1,700
Result	CPN (UML) gain	
Source: Election Commission

==== 2013 Constituent Assembly election ====
Party	Candidate	Votes
Nepali Congress	Bal Krishna Khand	18,481
CPN (Unified Marxist–Leninist)	Ghanshyam Bhusal	18,395
Rastriya Janamukti Party	Jham Bahadur Gurung	4,620
UCPN (Maoist)	Bharat Aryal	3,897
Madheshi Janaadhikar Forum, Nepal (Democratic)	Sant Prasad Chaudhary	1,891
Madheshi Janaadhikar Forum, Nepal	Ram Avatar Yadav	1,063
Others		2,225
Result	Congress hold	
Source: NepalNews

=== Election in the 2000s ===
==== 2008 Constituent Assembly election ====
Party	Candidate	Votes
Nepali Congress	Bal Krishna Khand	16,790
CPN (Unified Marxist–Leninist)	Lila Giri	15,458
CPN (Maoist)	Tej Kumari Paudel	11,554
Terai Madhesh Loktantrik Party	Shiva Kumar Tharu Chaudhary	1,645
Independent	Yam Bahadur Pun	1,336
Others		5,017
Invalid votes		2,035
Result	Congress hold	
Source: Election Commission

=== Election in the 1990s ===
==== 1999 legislative elections ====
Party	Candidate	Votes
Nepali Congress	Surya Prasad Pradhan	23,697
CPN (Unified Marxist–Leninist)	Bishnu Prasad Paudel	23,033
Rastriya Janamukti Party	Jasmaya Gurung	2,289
Nepal Sadbhawana Party	Ram Kewal Yadav	2,120
CPN (Marxist–Leninist)	Manbir Garbuja Magar	1,728
Others		2,015
Invalid votes		1,268
Result	Congress gain	
Source: Election Commission

==== 1994 legislative elections ====
Party	Candidate	Votes
CPN (Unified Marxist–Leninist)	Mod Nath Prasrit	19,675
Nepali Congress	Bal Krishna Khand	15,349
Rastriya Prajatantra Party	Pradip Udaya	5,462
Nepal Sadbhavana Party	Ram Kewal Yadav	2,960
Rastriya Janamukti Party	Malabar Singh Thapa	1,815
Others		689
Result	CPN (UML) gain	
Source: Election Commission

==== 1991 legislative elections ====
Party	Candidate	Votes
Nepali Congress	Bal Krishna Khand	16,778
CPN (Unified Marxist–Leninist)	Keshar Mani Pokharel	14,640
Result	Congress gain	

== See also ==
- List of parliamentary constituencies of Nepal
