= Bal Krishna Khand =

Nepali politician

- बालकृष्ण खाँण
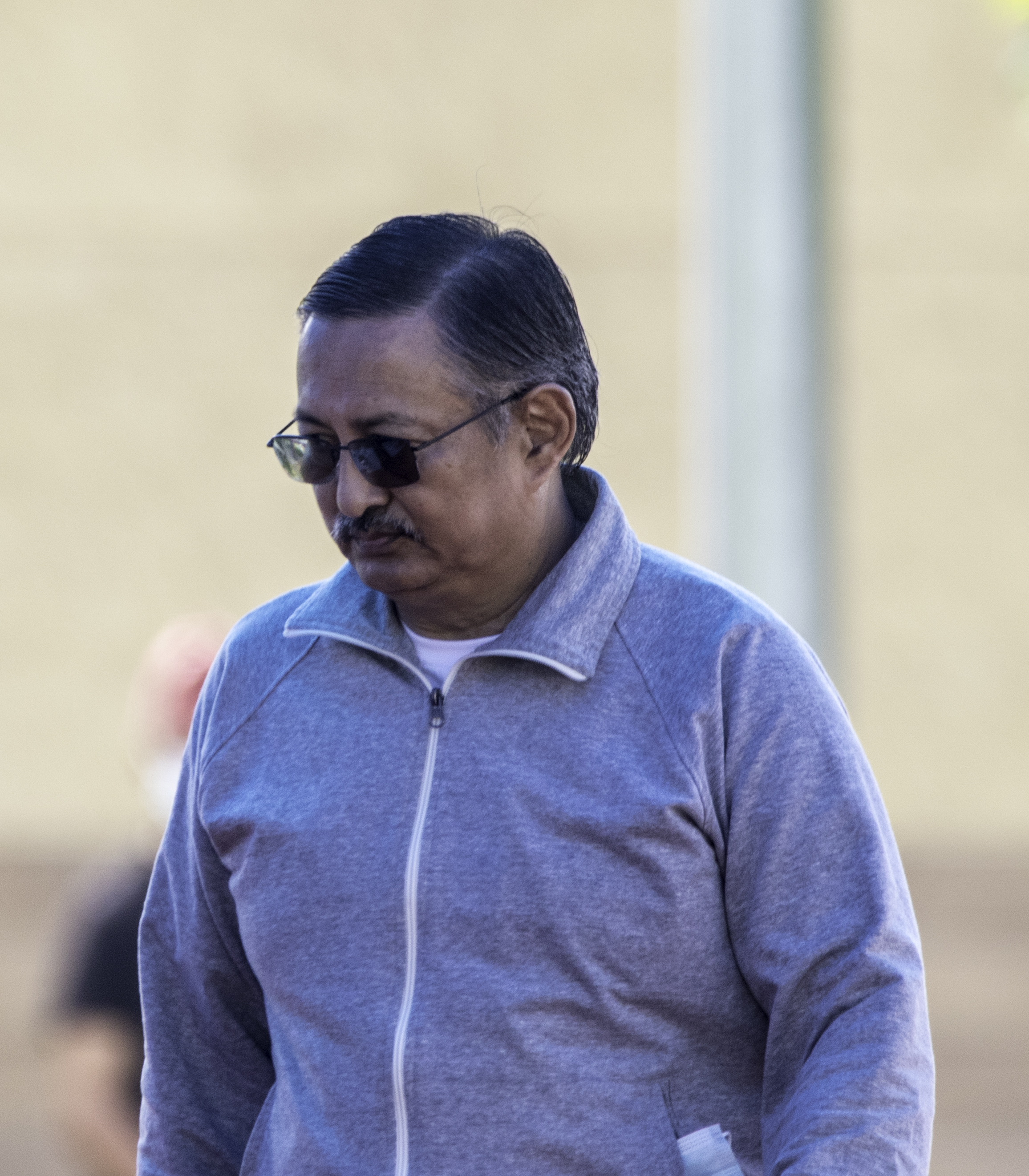

Minister of Home Affairs of Nepal
- In office 12 July 2021 – 26 December 2022
- President: Bidhya Devi Bhandari
- Prime Minister: Sher Bahadur Deuba
- Preceded by: Bishnu Prasad Paudel

Defence Minister of Nepal
- In office 26 August 2016 – 31 May 2017
- President: Bidhya Devi Bhandari
- Prime Minister: Puspha Kamal Dahal
- Preceded by: Bhim Bahadur Rawal
- Succeeded by: Bhimsen Das Pradhan

Minister of Irrigation of Nepal
- In office 25 May 2009 – 6 February 2011
- President: Ram Baran Yadav
- Prime Minister: Madhav Kumar Nepal

Member of the House of Representatives
- In office 4 March 2018 – 18 September 2022
- PR group: Khas Arya
- Constituency: Nepali Congress PR list

Member of the Legislature Parliament
- In office 21 January 2014 – 14 October 2017
- Preceded by: himself
- Succeeded by: Ghanashyam Bhusal
- Constituency: Rupandehi

Member of the Constituent Assembly of Nepal
- In office 28 May 2008 – 28 May 2012
- Preceded by: Surya Prasad Pradhan
- Succeeded by: himself
- Constituency: Rupandehi

Member of House of Representatives
- In office May 1991 – August 1994
- Preceded by: Constituency established
- Succeeded by: Modanath Prasrit
- Constituency: Rupandehi

Personal details
- Born: June 1960 (age 66) Syangja, Nepal
- Party: Nepali Congress (before 2002; 2007–present)
- Other political affiliations: Nepali Congress (Democratic) (2002–2007)
- Spouse: Manju Khand
- Parent: Noindra Khand (father) Topkumari Khand (mother)

Bal Krishna Khand (Nepali: बालकृष्ण खाँण) is a Nepalese politician, former Home Minister of Nepal and a convicted criminal in the Bhutanese refugees scam. Khand is a central working committee member of the Nepali Congress party. Khand also served as the Defense Minister of Nepal under the Second Dahal cabinet.

== Political life ==
Khand was the president of the NC youth wing, Nepal Tarun Dal. When the party was divided in 2003, Khand joined the Nepali Congress (Democratic). Khand was included in the Central Working Committee of the new party. NC(D) later merged back with NC, though. After the royal coup d'état, Khand was arrested and jailed. In the 2008 Constituent Assembly election and 2013 Constituent Assembly election he was elected from the Rupandehi-3 constituency. In the 2017, NC-RPP formed an alliance when Khand had to leave his constituency to Ex-Forest Minister Deepak Bohara from Rastriya Prajatantra Party. So, he was elected from the proportional of Nepali Congress.

Born in Syangja in 2017 BS, Khand has been active in politics since 2033 BS. Leading the Nepal Students Union and Nepal Tarun Dal, Khand, who is active in party politics, has previously taken charge of the Ministry of Irrigation and Defense. Khand has been the chief whip of the Nepali Congress, is now holding portfolio Home Minister.

His house in Tilottama, Rupandehi was burned down by a mob of protesters during the 2025 Nepalese Gen Z protests.

He is married to Manju Khand.

== Bhutanese Refugees Scam ==
On May 13, 2023, Khand was arrested by the Kathmandu Police Circle at his residence in Mainjubahal for his alleged involvement in the Bhutanese refugees scam.

On 14 July 2026, Khand was sentenced to 2 year imprisonment by Kathmandu District court after finding him guilty on the case. He was found guilty on the charge as an accomplice to fraud, organised crime and offences against the state.

== Electoral history ==
=== 2022 general election ===
Candidate	Party	Votes	%
Deepak Bohara	Rastriya Prajatantra Party	36,717	41.62
Bal Krishna Khand	Nepali Congress	34,036	38.58
Jeet Bahadur Gupta Teli	Rastriya Swatantra Party	5,796	6.57
Tulsi Prasad Tharu	Nagrik Unmukti Party	4,751	5.39
Pramod Kumar Raut	Janamat Party	3,317	3.76
Prakhyat Banjade	Hamro Nepali Party	1,384	1.57
Keshav Bikram Khadka	Independent	1,056	1.20
Others		1,155	1.31
Total		88,212	100.00
Majority		2,681	
Rastriya Prajatantra Party			

=== 2013 Constituent Assembly election ===
Rupandehi-3
Party	Candidate	Votes
Nepali Congress	Bal Krishna Khand	18,481
CPN (Unified Marxist–Leninist)	Ghanshyam Bhusal	18,395
Rastriya Janamukti Party	Jham Bahadur Gurung	4,620
UCPN (Maoist)	Bharat Aryal	3,897
Madheshi Janaadhikar Forum, Nepal (Democratic)	Sant Prasad Chaudhary	1,891
Madheshi Janaadhikar Forum, Nepal	Ram Avatar Yadav	1,063
Others		2,225
Result	Congress hold	
Source: NepalNews

=== 2008 Constituent Assembly election ===
Rupandehi-3
Party	Candidate	Votes
Nepali Congress	Bal Krishna Khand	16,790
CPN (Unified Marxist–Leninist)	Lila Giri	15,458
CPN (Maoist)	Tej Kumari Paudel	11,554
Terai Madhesh Loktantrik Party	Shiva Kumar Tharu Chaudhary	1,645
Independent	Yam Bahadur Pun	1,336
Others		5,017
Invalid votes		2,035
Result	Congress hold	
Source: Election Commission

=== 1994 legislative elections ===
Party	Candidate	Votes
CPN (UML)	Mod Nath Prasrit	19,675
Nepali Congress	Bal Krishna Khand	15,349
Rastriya Prajatantra Party	Pradip Udaya	5,462
Nepal Sadbhavana Party	Ram Kewal Yadav	2,960
Rastriya Janamukti Party	Malabar Singh Thapa	1,815
Others		689
Result	CPN (UML) gain	
Source: Election Commission

=== 1991 legislative elections ===
Party	Candidate	Votes
Nepali Congress	Bal Krishna Khand	16,778
CPN (UML)	Keshar Mani Pokharel	14,640
Result	Congress gain	
