= Dang 3 =

Parliamentary constituency in Nepal

- Parliamentary constituency
- Dang 3 in Lumbini Province
- Province: Lumbini Province
- District: Dang District
- Electorate: 150,720
- Major settlements: Tulsipur; Babai; Dangisharan; Shantinagar

Current constituency
- Created: 1991
- Seats: 1
- Party: Rastriya Swatantra Party
- Member of Parliament: Kamal Subedi
- Local Levels: Tulsipur Sub-Metropolitan City (wards 1–15); Babai Rural Municipality; Dangisharan Rural Municipality; Shantinagar Rural Municipality
- Lumbini MPA 3(A): Dilli Bahadur Chaudhary, Congress
- Lumbini MPA 3(B): Dhan Bahadur Maski, Maoist Centre
- Lumbini Provincial Assembly Seats: 2

Dang 3 one of three parliamentary constituencies of Dang District in Nepal. This constituency came into existence on the Constituency Delimitation Commission (CDC) report submitted on 31 August 2017.

== Incorporated areas ==
Dang 3 incorporates Babai Rural Municipality, Shantinagar Rural Municipality, Dangisharan Rural Municipality, and wards 1–15 of Tulsipur Sub-metropolitan City.

== Assembly segments ==
It encompasses the following Lumbini Provincial Assembly segment

- Dang 3(A)
- Dang 3(B)

== Members of Parliament ==
=== Parliament/Constituent Assembly ===
| Election | Member | Party |
|---|---|---|
| 1991 | Khum Bahadur Khadka | Nepali Congress |
| 1994 | Shankar Pokharel | CPN (Unified Marxist- Leninist) |
| 1999 | Krishna Kishor Ghimire | Nepali Congress |
| 2008 | Krishna Bahadur Mahara | CPN (Maoist) |
| January 2009 | Krishna Bahadur Mahara | UCPN (Maoist) |
| 2013 | Raju Khanal | Nepali Congress |
| 2017 | Hira Chandra K.C. | CPN (Unified Marxist–Leninist) |
| May 2018 | Hira Chandra K.C. | Nepal Communist Party |
| March 2021 | Hira Chandra K.C. | CPN (Unified Marxist–Leninist) |
| August 2021 | Hira Chandra K.C. | CPN (Unified Socialist) |
| 2022 | Deepak Giri | Nepali Congress |
| 2026 | Kamal Subedi | Rastriya Swatantra Party |

=== Provincial Assembly ===
==== 3(A) ====
| Election | Member | Party |
|---|---|---|
| 2017 | Dilli Bahadur Chaudhary | Nepali Congress |
| 2022 | Dilli Bahadur Chaudhary | Nepali Congress |

==== 3(B) ====
| Election | Member | Party |
|---|---|---|
| 2017 | Uttar Kumar Oli | CPN (Unified Marxist-Leninist) |
| May 2018 | Uttar Kumar Oli | Nepal Communist Party |
| 2019 by-election | Bimala Kumari Khatri | Nepal Communist Party |
| 2022 | Dhan Bahadur Maski | CPN (Maoist Centre) |

== Election results ==
=== Election in the 2020s ===
==== 2026 general election ====
| Candidate | Party | Votes | % |
|---|---|---|---|
| Kamal Subedi | Rastriya Swatantra Party | 44,248 | 52.15 |
| Deepak Giri | Nepali Congress | 16,453 | 19.39 |
| Ghanshyam Pandey | CPN (UML) | 12,195 | 14.37 |
| Dhan Bahadur Maski | Nepali Communist Party | 9,328 | 10.99 |
| Damodar Bhandari | Rastriya Prajatantra Party | 1,057 | 1.25 |
| Others | | 1,560 | 1.84 |
| Total | | 84,841 | 100.00 |
| Majority | | 27,795 | |
| Rastriya Swatantra Party gain from Nepali Congress | | | |

==== 2022 general election ====
| Candidate | Party | Votes | % |
|---|---|---|---|
| Deepak Giri | Nepali Congress | 36,911 | 43.37 |
| Komal Oli | CPN (UML) | 29,092 | 34.18 |
| Kamal Subedi | Rastriya Swatantra Party | 15,326 | 18.01 |
| Oj Bahadur Khadka | Rastriya Prajatantra Party | 1,536 | 1.80 |
| Others | | 2,247 | 2.64 |
| Total | | 85,112 | 100.00 |
| Majority | | 7,819 | |
| Nepali Congress gain | | | |

=== Election in the 2010s ===
==== 2019 by-elections ====
===== 3(B) =====
| Party | Candidate | Votes |
|---|---|---|
| Nepal Communist Party | Bimala Kumari Khatri | 24,286 |
| Nepali Congress | Keshav Raj Acharya | 19,182 |
| Others | | 1,036 |
| Invalid votes | | 797 |
| Result | NCP hold | |
Source: Election Commission

==== 2017 legislative elections ====
| Party | Candidate | Votes |
|---|---|---|
| CPN (Unified Marxist–Leninist) | Hira Chandra K.C. | 40,287 |
| Nepali Congress | Deepak Giri | 33,730 |
| CPN (Marxist–Leninist) | Him Lal Chaudhary | 1,409 |
| Others | | 1,080 |
| Invalid votes | | 4,428 |
| Result | CPN (UML) gain | |
Source: Election Commission

==== 2017 Nepalese provincial elections ====
===== 3(A) =====
| Party | Candidate | Votes |
|---|---|---|
| Nepali Congress | Dilli Bahadur Chaudhary | 17,036 |
| CPN (Maoist Centre) | Jag Prasad Sharma | 14,700 |
| Others | | 2,746 |
| Invalid votes | | 1,704 |
| Result | Congress gain | |
Source: Election Commission

===== 3(B) =====
| Party | Candidate | Votes |
|---|---|---|
| CPN (Unified Marxist–Leninist) | Uttar Kumar Wali | 23,970 |
| Nepali Congress | Budhhi Ram Bhandari | 17,535 |
| Others | | 1,144 |
| Invalid votes | | 2,002 |
| Result | CPN (UML) gain | |
Source: Election Commission

==== 2013 Constituent Assembly election ====
| Party | Candidate | Votes |
|---|---|---|
| Nepali Congress | Raju Khanal | 15,048 |
| CPN (Unified Marxist–Leninist) | Laxman Acharya | 7,942 |
| UCPN (Maoist) | Nirmal Acharya | 7,408 |
| Others | | 4,048 |
| Result | Congress gain | |
Source: NepalNews

=== Election in the 2000s ===
==== 2008 Constituent Assembly election ====
| Party | Candidate | Votes |
|---|---|---|
| CPN (Maoist) | Krishna Bahadur Mahara | 20,784 |
| Nepali Congress | Anita Devkota | 10,812 |
| CPN (Unified Marxist–Leninist) | Chhabi Lal Oli | 4,879 |
| CPN (Marxist–Leninist) | Mangal Prasad Chaudhary | 3,337 |
| Rastriya Prajatantra Party | Dinesh Bahadur Neupane | 1,157 |
| Others | | 1,334 |
| Invalid votes | | 2,113 |
| Result | Maoist gain | |
Source: Election Commission

=== Election in the 1990s ===
==== 1999 legislative elections ====
| Party | Candidate | Votes |
|---|---|---|
| Nepali Congress | Krishna Kishor Ghimire | 19,072 |
| CPN (Unified Marxist–Leninist) | Shankar Pokharel | 11,647 |
| CPN (Marxist–Leninist) | Giri Raj K.C. | 8,085 |
| Rastriya Prajatantra Party | Shovakar Thapa | 1,121 |
| Others | | 662 |
| Invalid votes | | 196 |
| Result | Congress gain | |
Source: Election Commission

==== 1994 legislative elections ====
| Party | Candidate | Votes |
|---|---|---|
| CPN (Unified Marxist–Leninist) | Shankar Pokharel | 19,366 |
| Nepali Congress | Deepak Giri | 16,351 |
| Rastriya Prajatantra Party | Goma Giri | 1,481 |
| Others | | 414 |
| Result | CPN (UML) gain | |
Source: Election Commission

==== 1991 legislative elections ====
| Party | Candidate | Votes |
|---|---|---|
| Nepali Congress | Khum Bahadur Khadka | 24,105 |
| CPN (Unified Marxist–Leninist) | | 14,594 |
| Result | Congress gain | |

== See also ==
- List of parliamentary constituencies of Nepal
