= Ghanashyam Bhusal =

Nepalese Politician

Honourable Ghanashyam Bhusal
- घनश्याम भूसाल

General Secretary of CPN (Unified Socialist)
- In office 19 March 2023 – 4 November 2025
- Preceded by: Beduram Bhusal
- Succeeded by: position abolished

Minister of Agriculture and Livestock Development
- In office 21 November 2019 – 20 December 2020
- President: Bidhya Devi Bhandari
- Prime Minister: KP Oli
- Preceded by: Chakrapani Khanal
- Succeeded by: Mahendra Rai Yadav

Member of Parliament, Pratinidhi Sabha
- In office 4 March 2018 – 18 September 2022
- Preceded by: Bal Krishna Khand
- Constituency: Rupandehi 3
- In office 1997 – May 1999
- Preceded by: Dhanpati Upadhyaya
- Succeeded by: Ram Krishna Tamrakar
- Constituency: Rupandehi 2

Personal details
- Born: 11 September 1961 (age 65) Pidikhola, Nepal
- Party: CPN (United)
- Other political affiliations: CPN (Unified Socialist) (2023-present); CPN (ML) (1998–2002); CPN (UML) (2002–2022); Independent (2022-2023)

Ghanashyam Bhusal (Nepali: घनश्याम भूसाल; born 11 September 1961) is a Nepalese politician who serves as coordinator of Unified Socialist Reorganization Campaign. He also served the Member of House of Representatives (Nepal) from Rupandehi 3 constituency of Lumbini province. Bhusal was the general secretary of CPN (Unified Socialist) till it merged with other political parties to form Nepali Communist Party.

He is the former Minister at Ministry of Agricultural and Livestock Development (Nepal). Bhusal has also served as a minister of Office of the Prime minister and council of ministers under former minister Jhala Nath Khanal.

== Early life and start of political career ==
Ghanashyam Bhusal was born as third child to Jhabisara Bhusal and Jagganath Bhusal on 11 September 1961, in Pidikhola, Syangja District. His family later shifted to Rupandehi district where he started his political life as a student leader. He was General-Secretary of All Nepal National Free Students Union ANNFSU, the student wing of the Nepal Communist Party.

== Electoral history ==
=== 2022 general election ===
Rupandehi 1

Candidate	Party	Votes	%
Chhabilal Bishwakarma	CPN (UML)	24,882	27.58
Ghanashyam Bhusal	Independent	21,318	23.63
Naresh Bahadur Pachhai Chhetri	Rastriya Swatantra Party	14,145	15.68
Dhaniram Chaudhary	Nagrik Unmukti Party	13,962	15.47
Kailash Gurung	Janamat Party	5,169	5.73
Tikaram Jaisi Chapagain	Independent	3,489	3.87
Matrika Prasad Yadav	Independent	1,713	1.90
Dal Bahadur Thapa	Rastriya Janamukti Party	1,397	1.55
Bishal Baskota	Hamro Nepali Party	1,097	1.22
Shiva Bahadur Gurung	Mongol National Organisation	1,072	1.19
Others		1,983	2.20
Total		90,227	100.00
Majority		3,564	
CPN (UML) hold			

=== 2017 legislative elections ===
Rupandehi 3
Party	Candidate	Votes
CPN (Unified Marxist–Leninist)	Ghanshyam Bhusal	32,866
Rastriya Prajatantra Party (Democratic)	Deepak Bohora	27,422
Federal Socialist Forum, Nepal	Mahendra Yadav	12,536
Rastriya Janamukti Party	Surya Kumar Saru Magar	2,409
Unified Rastriya Prajatantra Party (Nationalist)	Kamal Prasad Sharma Upadhyaya	1,856
Others		2,894
Invalid votes		4,063
Result	CPN (UML) gain	
Source: Election Commission

=== 1997 by election ===
Rupandehi 2
Party	Candidate
CPN (Unified Marxist–Leninist)	Ghanshyam Bhusal
Others	
Result	CPN (UML) gain
Source: Election Commission

== See also ==
- CPN (United)
