= Menuka Khand K.C. =

Nepalese politician

Honourable Menuka Khand K.C.
- मेनुका खांण के. सी.

Deputy Speaker of the Lumbini Provincial Assembly
- Incumbent
- Assumed office 18 January 2023
- Governor: Amik Sherchan
- Chief Minister: Chet Narayan Acharya
- Speaker: Tularam Gharti Magar
- Preceded by: Krishni Tharu

Member of the Lumbini Provincial Assembly
- Incumbent
- Assumed office 1 January 2023

Personal details
- Born: 17 June 1979 (age 46) Chappani, Palpa District, Lumbini Province, Nepal
- Party: Rastriya Prajatantra Party

Menuka Khand K.C. (Nepali: मेनुका खांण के.सी.) is a Nepalese politician and currently serving as the Deputy Speaker of the Lumbini Provincial Assembly since 18 January 2023. She is currently serving as a member of the 2nd Lumbini Provincial Assembly. In the 2022 Nepalese provincial election she was elected as a proportional representative from the Khas people category.
