= Deepak Giri =

Nepali politician

Honourable Deepak Giri MP
- दीपक गिरी

Minister of Irrigation
- In office 26 August 2016 – 31 May 2017
- President: Bidhya Devi Bhandari
- Prime Minister: Puspha Kamal Dahal

Member of Parliament, Pratinidhi Sabha
- In office 22 December 2022 – 12 September 2025
- Preceded by: Hira Chandra KC
- Succeeded by: Kamal Subedi
- Constituency: Dang 3

Member of the 2nd Nepalese Constituent Assembly
- Incumbent
- Assumed office 21 January 2014
- Preceded by: Sushma Sharma Ghimire
- Succeeded by: Constituency abolished
- Constituency: Dang 5

Personal details
- Born: 2 April 1962 (age 64) Dang District, Nepal
- Party: Nepali Congress

Deepak Giri (Nepali: दीपक गिरी) is a member of 2nd Nepalese Constituent Assembly. He won Dang–5 seat in 2013 Nepalese Constituent Assembly election from Nepali Congress. He became the irrigation minister of Prachanda Cabinet.

In the 2022 Nepalese general election, he was elected as the member of the 2nd Federal Parliament of Nepal.
