= Anup Kumar Upadhyay =

Nepalese social activist and politician

- अनुप कुमार उपाध्याय

Chairman of Ujyaalo Nepal Party
- Incumbent
- Assumed office November 2025
- Preceded by: Position established

Personal details
- Born: Kailali, Nepal
- Party: Ujyaalo Nepal Party
- Occupation: Engineer, Bureaucrat, Politician

Anup Kumar Upadhyay (Nepali: अनुप कुमार उपाध्याय) is a Nepalese bureaucrat turned politician and chairman of the alternative political force, Ujyaalo Nepal Party. Formerly the energy secretary and vice chairman of planning commission of Sudurpashchim Province, Upadhyay was selected as chairman of party formed jointly with Kul Man Ghising. He has also served as the chairman of Nepal Electricity Regulatory Commission.

== See also ==
- Ujyaalo Nepal Party
