= Rupandehi 1 =

Parliamentary constituency in Lumbini Province, Nepal

- Parliamentary constituency
- Rupandehi 1 in Lumbini Province
- Province: Lumbini Province
- District: Rupandehi District

Current constituency
- Created: 1991
- Party: Rastriya Swatantra Party
- Member of Parliament: Sunil Lamsal

Rupandehi 1 one of three parliamentary constituencies of Rupandehi District in Nepal. This constituency came into existence on the Constituency Delimitation Commission (CDC) report submitted on 31 August 2017.

== Incorporated areas ==
Rupandehi 1 incorporates Devdaha Municipality, Rohini Rural Municipality, wards 1 and 3–5 of Omsatiya Rural Municipality and wards 7–12 and 15–16 of Tilottama Municipality.

== Assembly segments ==
It encompasses the following Lumbini Provincial Assembly segment

- Rupandehi 1(A)
- Rupandehi 1(B)

== Members of Parliament ==
=== Parliament/Constituent Assembly ===
Election	Member	Party
1991	Duryodhan Singh	Nepali Congress
2008	Ghan Shyam Yadav Ahir	CPN (Maoist)
January 2009	Ghan Shyam Yadav Ahir	UCPN (Maoist)
2013	Abdul Razak Gaddi	Nepali Congress
2017	Chhabi Lal Bishwakarma	CPN (Unified Marxist–Leninist)
May 2018	Chhabi Lal Bishwakarma	Nepal Communist Party
March 2021	Chhabi Lal Bishwakarma	CPN (Unified Marxist–Leninist)
2026	Sunil Lamsal	Rastriya Swatantra Party

=== Provincial Assembly ===
==== 1(A) ====
Election	Member	Party
2017	Krishna Prasad Neupane	CPN (Unified Marxist-Leninist)
May 2018	Krishna Prasad Neupane	Nepal Communist Party

==== 1(B) ====
Election	Member	Party
2017	Dadhiram Neupane	CPN (Maoist Centre)
May 2018	Dadhiram Neupane	Nepal Communist Party

== Election results ==
=== Election in the 2020s ===
==== 2022 general election ====
Candidate	Party	Votes	%
Chhabilal Bishwakarma	CPN (UML)	24,882	27.58
Ghanashyam Bhusal	Independent	21,318	23.63
Naresh Bahadur Pachhai Chhetri	Rastriya Swatantra Party	14,145	15.68
Dhaniram Chaudhary	Nagrik Unmukti Party	13,962	15.47
Kailash Gurung	Janamat Party	5,169	5.73
Tikaram Jaisi Chapagain	Independent	3,489	3.87
Matrika Prasad Yadav	Independent	1,713	1.90
Dal Bahadur Thapa	Rastriya Janamukti Party	1,397	1.55
Bishal Baskota	Hamro Nepali Party	1,097	1.22
Shiva Bahadur Gurung	Mongol National Organisation	1,072	1.19
Others		1,983	2.20
Total		90,227	100.00
Majority		3,564	
CPN (UML) hold			

=== Election in the 2010s ===
==== 2017 legislative elections ====
Party	Candidate	Votes
CPN (Unified Marxist–Leninist)	Chhabi Lal Bishwakarma	34,752
Nepali Congress	Abdul Razak Gaddi	26,885
Federal Socialist Forum, Nepal	Bidya Prasad Yadav	12,764
Rastriya Janamukti Party	Jham Bahadur Gurung	3,548
Rastriya Janata Party Nepal	Chandrabhan Tiwari	2,374
Others		2,351
Invalid votes		4,241
Result	CPN (UML) gain	
Source: Election Commission

==== 2017 Nepalese provincial elections ====
===== 1(A) =====
Party	Candidate	Votes
CPN (Unified Marxist–Leninist)	Krishna Prasad Neupane	19,520
Rastriya Prajatantra Party (Democratic)	Tahir Ali Bhat	13,141
Federal Socialist Forum, Nepal	Nawanit Kumar Mishra	4,652
Rastriya Janata Party Nepal	Bijay Bahadur Singh	1,936
Naya Shakti Party, Nepal	Devendra Nath Pandey	1,419
Others		1,861
Invalid votes		1,462
Result	CPN (UML) gain	
Source: Election Commission

===== 1(B) =====
Party	Candidate	Votes
CPN (Maoist Centre)	Dadhiram Neupane	13,094
Nepali Congress	Hari Neupane	11,108
Federal Socialist Forum, Nepal	Manjit Kumar Yadav	7,233
Rastriya Janamukti Party	Aash Bahadur Gurung	3,068
Rastriya Janata Party Nepal	Mahendra Gupta	2,670
Independent	Krishna Prasad Paudel	1,703
Others		2,125
Invalid votes		1,632
Result	Maoist Centre gain	
Source: Election Commission

==== 2013 Constituent Assembly election ====
Party	Candidate	Votes
Nepali Congress	Abdul Razak Gaddi	14,400
CPN (Unified Marxist–Leninist)	Chhabi Lal Bishwakarma	14,196
UCPN (Maoist)	Devendra Nath Panday	7,444
Rastriya Prajatantra Party	Sita Ram Chhetri	1,555
Rastriya Janamukti Party	Dal Bahadur Thapa	1,310
Madheshi Janaadhikar Forum, Nepal	Bidaya Prasad Yadav	1,102
Dalit Janajati Party	Shiva Kumar Dhobi Dhawal	1,067
Others		3,426
Result	Congress gain	
Source: NepalNews

=== Election in the 2000s ===
==== 2008 Constituent Assembly election ====
Party	Candidate	Votes
CPN (Maoist)	Ghan Shyam Yadav Ahir	12,624
Nepali Congress	Abdul Razak Gaddi	11,003
CPN (Unified Marxist–Leninist)	Babu Ram Chaudhary	10,630
Rastriya Prajatantra Party	Deepak Bohara	7,536
Madheshi Janaadhikar Forum, Nepal	Sanotsh Kumar Panday	2,064
CPN (Marxist–Leninist)	Madhu K.C. G.C.	1,632
Others		3,089
Invalid votes		2,744
Result	Maoist gain	
Source: Election Commission

=== Election in the 1990s ===
==== 1999 legislative elections ====
Party	Candidate	Votes
Nepali Congress	Duryodhan Singh	13,092
Rastriya Prajatantra Party (Chand)	Deepak Bohara	12,771
CPN (Unified Marxist–Leninist)	Ghan Shyam Yadav Ahir	11,439
Rastriya Janamukti Party	Laxman Rana	1,840
CPN (Marxist–Leninist)	Baburam Chaudhary	1,353
Rastriya Prajatantra Party	Dil Bahadur Basnet	1,074
Others		2,676
Invalid votes		688
Result	Congress hold	
Source: Election Commission

==== 1994 legislative elections ====
Party	Candidate	Votes
Nepali Congress	Duryodhan Singh	12,819
CPN (Unified Marxist–Leninist)	Gham Shyam Bhusal	11,243
Rastriya Prajatantra Party	Deepak Bohara	9,149
Nepal Sadbhavana Party	Satya Jeevan Prasad	1,303
Others		1,559
Result	Congress hold	
Source: Election Commission

==== 1991 legislative elections ====
Party	Candidate	Votes
Nepali Congress	Duryodhan Singh	9,925
CPN (Unified Marxist–Leninist)		9,418
Result	Congress gain	

== See also ==
- List of parliamentary constituencies of Nepal
