= Babai Rural Municipality =

Gaunpalika in Lumbini Province, Nepal

Babai Rural Municipality बबई गाउँपालिका
- Gaunpalika
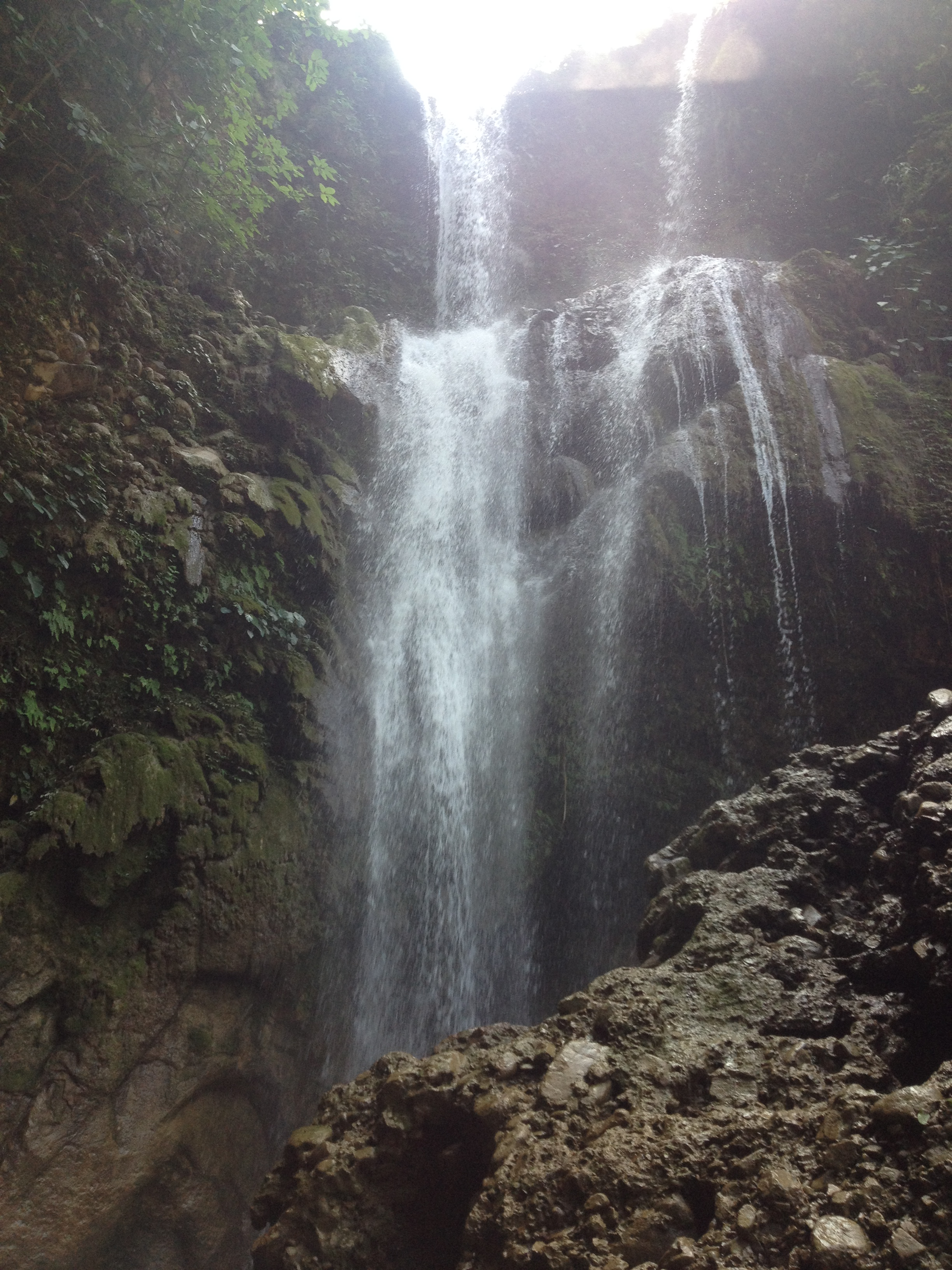
- Purandhara waterfall

- Location in Nepal
- Coordinates: 28.351851°N 81.718791°E
- Country: Nepal
- Province: Lumbini Province
- District: Dang District
- Established: 2073-11-23 B.S.

Area
  - Total: 257.48 km^{2} (99.41 sq mi)
- Elevation: 520 m (1,710 ft)

Population
  - Total: 27,469
  - Density: 106.68/km^{2} (276.31/sq mi)
- Time zone: UTC+5:45 (Nepal Time)
- Website: http://babaimun.gov.np/

Babai Rural Municipality (Nepali :बबई गाउँपालिका) is a Gaunpalika in Dang District in Lumbini Province of Nepal. On 12 March 2017, the government of Nepal implemented a new local administrative structure, with the implementation of the new local administrative structure, VDCs have been replaced with municipal and Village Councils. Babai is one of these 753 local units. Babai Rural Municipality has area of 257.48 km^{2}. Babai RM is surrounded by Shantinagar Rural Municipality and Dangisharan Rural Municipality in the east, Banke district in the west, Salyan district in the north and in south there is Dangisharan Rural Municipality and Banke district.

== Demographics ==
At the time of the 2011 Nepal census, Babai Rural Municipality had a population of 27,469. Of these, 94.2% spoke Nepali, 3.4% Tharu, 2.2% Magar and 0.1% other languages as their first language.

In terms of ethnicity/caste, 49.5% were Chhetri, 18.9% Magar, 12.4% Kami, 4.1% Tharu, 3.9% Hill Brahmin, 2.6% Damai/Dholi, 2.6% Sanyasi/Dasnami, 1.8% Sarki, 1.4% Kumal, 0.7% Thakuri, 0.5% Bote, 0.4% Gaine, 0.3% Badi, 0.3% Majhi, 0.1% Gharti/Bhujel, 0.1% Gurung, 0.1% Musalman, 0.1% Newar, 0.1% other Terai and 0.1% others.

In terms of religion, 96.3% were Hindu, 2.5% Christian, 1.1% Buddhist and 0.1% Muslim.

In terms of literacy, 64.6% could read and write, 1.9% could only read and 33.4% could neither read nor write.
