= Hamro Party Nepal =

Political party in Nepal

Hamro Party Nepal हाम्रो पार्टी नेपाल
- President: Khagendra Sunar
- Founded: 2025
- Merged into: Rastriya Swatantra Party
- Headquarters: Kathmandu
- Political position: Centre-left
- Colours

Website
- Official facebook Page

The Hamro Party Nepal (Nepali: हाम्रो पार्टी नेपाल, lit. 'Our Party Nepal') was a political party in Nepal led by Khagendra Sunar, a social activist. The party later got merged into Rastriya Swatantra Party to from a strong alternative force.

== Leadership ==
=== Chairman ===
- Khagendra Sunar (since 2025)

== See also ==
- Ujyaalo Nepal Party
