= Sunil Lamsal =

Nepalese Minister of Infrastructure Development since 2026

- सुनिल लम्साल

Minister of Infrastructure Development
- Incumbent
- Assumed office 14 May 2026
- President: Ram Chandra Paudel
- Prime Minister: Balendra Shah
- Preceded by: Position established
Other ministerial positions
Minister of Physical Infrastructure and Transport
In office 27 March 2026 – 14 May 2026
President	Ram Chandra Paudel
Prime Minister	Balendra Shah
Preceded by	Madhav Chaulagain
Succeeded by	Ministry dissolved (succeeded by Ministry of Infrastructure Development)
Minister of Urban Development
In office 27 March 2026 – 14 May 2026
President	Ram Chandra Paudel
Prime Minister	Balendra Shah
Preceded by	Kumar Ingnam
Succeeded by	Ministry dissolved (succeeded by Ministry of Infrastructure Development)

Member of Parliament, Pratinidhi Sabha
- Incumbent
- Assumed office 26 March 2026
- Preceded by: Chhabilal Bishwakarma
- Constituency: Rupandehi 1

Personal details
- Born: 4 October 1990 (age 36) Syangja District, Nepal
- Party: Rastriya Swatantra (since 2026)
- Education: Lumbini Engineering College; Nitte Meenakshi Institute of Technology

Er. Sunil Lamsal (Note: Nepali: सुनील लम्साल, romanized: Sunīl Lāmsāl, Nepali pronunciation: [suːnil lɑːmsɑːl]) (born 4 October 1990) is a Nepalese politician and structural engineer, who has served as the Minister of Infrastructure Development since 2026. He is a member of parliament, having been elected from Rupandehi-1 constituency as a candidate of Rastriya Swatantra Party in the 2026 general election.

== Early life and education ==
He was born in Kaligandaki Rural Municipality, Syangja District, Nepal, as a son of Bodhraj Lamsal and Jamuna Lamsal. His family relocated to Tilottama Municipality, Rupandehi, in 1995 (2052 BS), where he completed his school education. During his early years, he developed a strong interest in mathematics and science.

Lamsal earned a Bachelor's degree in Civil Engineering from Lumbini Engineering College. He later obtained a Master's degree in Structural Engineering from NITTE, Bengaluru, India. He is currently pursuing a Ph.D. in Solid Waste Management at Kathmandu University.

== Political career ==
Lamsal began his political journey during his student years through the All Nepal National Free Students Union (ANNFSU), affiliated with CPN-UML, where he was elected campus president. He later joined the Rastriya Swatantra Party.

He was elected as a Member of the House of Representatives from Rupandehi-1 in the 2026 general election, winning with 54,845 votes, a margin of over 42,000 votes against his nearest rival. His campaign emphasized technical competence, managerial vision, and development-focused governance.

== Professional background ==
Before entering full-time politics, Lamsal worked as an infrastructure and environment expert at the Kathmandu Metropolitan City under Mayor Balen Shah. In this role, he focused on waste management, urban planning, and traffic solutions.

Lamsal has contributed to several national infrastructure projects in Nepal. These include the reconstruction of Gautam Buddha International Airport in Bhairahawa, the development of Pokhara International Airport, and works related to Singha Durbar. He has also been involved in the construction of model schools across 35 districts and hospitals in 12 districts.

== Ministerial appointment and tenure (2026–present) ==
Lamsal assumed office as Minister of Physical Infrastructure and Transport and Minister of Urban Development on 27 March 2026 in the government led by Prime Minister Balendra Shah. The Ministry was then merged to form Ministry of Infrastructure Development on 13 May 2026.

=== Controversies and criticisms as minister ===
- Threatening to contractors: On 15 June, during inspection of work at Nagdhunga–Mugling road project Sunil Lamsal threatened the project contractors to break their legs if the work remains incomplete, which later went viral on social media. The aggressive remarks were highly criticized in social media by citizens and also by opposition political leaders regarding the tone of the seating minister. Similar incident followed on 20 June, where he threatened contractors saying "make contractors who don't complete work on time do their jobs, even if it means imprisoning them, blocking their paths, or beating them up". Many people criticized saying "even if the intent may not be bad, person in such highly valued post should not threaten public to create fear."
- Sending personal secretary to UN event: On 15 July, Sunil Lamsal ordered his Chief Personal Secretary, Bibek Bastola, to send his Advisor, Santosh Pandey, to the United Nations Habitat (UN Habitat) instead of the ministry secretary. The decision triggered strong controversy and was highly criticized by ministry's officials, bureaucrats and former bureaucrats, who questioned the purpose and propriety of sending a personal advisor in place of the ministry secretary. They said, "The purpose of such visits is not sightseeing, participants are expected to learn and bring back knowledge that can be applied in Nepal". The visit was also seen as lack of co-ordination happening in ministry which further showed the widened gap between the minister's secretariat and ministry staff.
