= Hira Chandra KC =

Nepali politician

Hira Chandra K.C.
- हिरा चन्द्र के.सी.

State Minister of Health and Population
- Incumbent
- Assumed office 27 June 2022
- Prime Minister: Sher Bahadur Deuba
- Preceded by: Bhawani Prasad Khapung

Member of Parliament, Pratinidhi Sabha
- Incumbent
- Assumed office 4 March 2018
- Preceded by: Raju Khanal
- Constituency: Dang 3

Personal details
- Born: 21 December 1975 (age 50)
- Party: CPN (Unified Socialist)
- Other political affiliations: CPN (UML)

Hira Chandra KC (Nepali: हिराचन्द्र केसी) (born 21 December 1975) is a Nepali politician, who is currently the State Minister of Health and Population in the ruling coalition led by Prime Minister and Nepali Congress President Sher Bahadur Deuba.

He is a member of the newly formed CPN (Unified Socialist). KC was elected as a Member of Parliament (MP) in the House of Representatives from Dang 3 (constituency) in the 2017 General Election. He was elected representing CPN UML of the left alliance, defeating his closest rival Dipak Giri of Nepali Congress. He secured 40,287 votes to Giri's 33,730.
