= Sulabh Kharel =

Nepalese politician

- सुलभ खरेल

Member of the House of Representatives
- Incumbent
- Assumed office 27 March 2026
- Preceded by: Bishnu Prasad Paudel
- Constituency: Rupandehi 2

Personal details
- Citizenship: Nepalese
- Party: Rastriya Swatantra Party
- Profession: Politician

Sulabh Kharel (Note: Nepali: सुलभ खरेल) is a Nepalese politician serving as a member of parliament from the Rastriya Swatantra Party. He is the member of the 3rd Federal Parliament of Nepal elected from Rupandehi 2 constituency in 2026 Nepalese General Election securing 56,550 votes and defeating Bishnu Poudel, the vice chairman of CPN UML.
