= Minister of Infrastructure Development (Nepal) =

Head of the Ministry of Infrastructure Development of Government of Nepal

- पूर्वाधार विकास मन्त्री
- Emblem of Nepal

- Flag of Nepal
- Incumbent; Sunil Lamsal since 13 May 2026
- Ministry of Infrastructure Development
- Style: Honourable
- Member of: Council of Ministers
- Reports to: Prime Minister, Parliament
- Seat: Singha Durbar, Nepal
- Nominator: Prime Minister
- Appointer: President
- Term length: No fixed term
- Precursor: Minister of Physical Infrastructure and Transport
- Formation: 13 May 2026
- First holder: Sunil Lamsal
- Deputy: Minister of State for Infrastructure Development

The Minister of Infrastructure Development (Nepali: पूर्वाधार विकास मन्त्री) is the head of the Ministry of Infrastructure Development of the Government of Nepal. The ministry was formed on 13 May 2026 by merging the former Ministry of Physical Infrastructure and Transport with selected functions of urban development and water infrastructure.

The minister is responsible for national transportation infrastructure, road networks, bridges, public transport, urban development, water supply infrastructure, and overall physical infrastructure planning and development.

Sunil Lamsal of the Rastriya Swatantra Party is the inaugural and current Minister of Infrastructure Development, having assumed office on 13 May 2026 following the administrative restructuring under Prime Minister Balendra Shah.

== List of ministers ==
#	Name	Took office	Left office	Time in office	Prime Minister	Minister's party	
Minister of Physical Infrastructure and Transport
1	Bijay Kumar Gachhadar	12 October 2015	4 August 2016	297		KP Sharma Oli	NLF
2	Ramesh Lekhak	4 August 2016	31 May 2017	300		Pushpa Kamal Dahal	Nepali Congress
3	Bir Bahadur Balayar	25 July 2017	15 February 2018	205		Sher Bahadur Deuba	Nepali Congress
4	Raghubir Mahaseth	16 March 2018	20 November 2019	614		KP Sharma Oli	CPN (UML)
4	Raghubir Mahaseth	16 March 2018	20 November 2019	614		KP Sharma Oli	NCP
5	Basanta Kumar Nemwang	21 November 2019	12 July 2021	599		KP Sharma Oli	NCP
5	Basanta Kumar Nemwang	21 November 2019	12 July 2021	599		KP Sharma Oli	CPN (UML)
6	Renu Kumari Yadav	8 October 2021	4 July 2022	269		Sher Bahadur Deuba	PSP–Nepal
7	Mohammad Ishtiyaq Rayi	4 August 2022	14 October 2022	71		Sher Bahadur Deuba	PSP–Nepal
–	Sher Bahadur Deuba	14 October 2022	26 December 2022	73		Sher Bahadur Deuba	Nepali Congress
8	Narayan Kaji Shrestha	26 December 2022	31 March 2023	95		Pushpa Kamal Dahal	CPN (MC)
9	Prakash Jwala	31 March 2023	4 March 2024	339		Pushpa Kamal Dahal	CPN (US)
–	Pushpa Kamal Dahal	4 March 2024	6 March 2024	2		Pushpa Kamal Dahal	CPN (MC)
10	Raghubir Mahaseth	6 March 2024	3 July 2024	119		Pushpa Kamal Dahal	CPN (UML)
–	Pushpa Kamal Dahal	4 July 2024	15 July 2024	11		Pushpa Kamal Dahal	CPN (MC)
11	Devendra Dahal	15 July 2024	9 September 2025	421		KP Sharma Oli	CPN (UML)
–	Sushila Karki	12 September 2025	15 September 2025	3		Sushila Karki	Independent
12	Kulman Ghising	15 September 2025	7 January 2026	114		Sushila Karki	Independent
13	Madhav Prasad Chaulagain	7 January 2026	27 March 2026	79		Sushila Karki	Independent
14	Sunil Lamsal	27 March 2026	13 May 2026	47		Balendra Shah	RSP
Minister of Infrastructure Development
(14)	Sunil Lamsal	13 May 2026	Incumbent	118		Balendra Shah	RSP
