= Purandhara waterfall =

Waterfall in Nepal

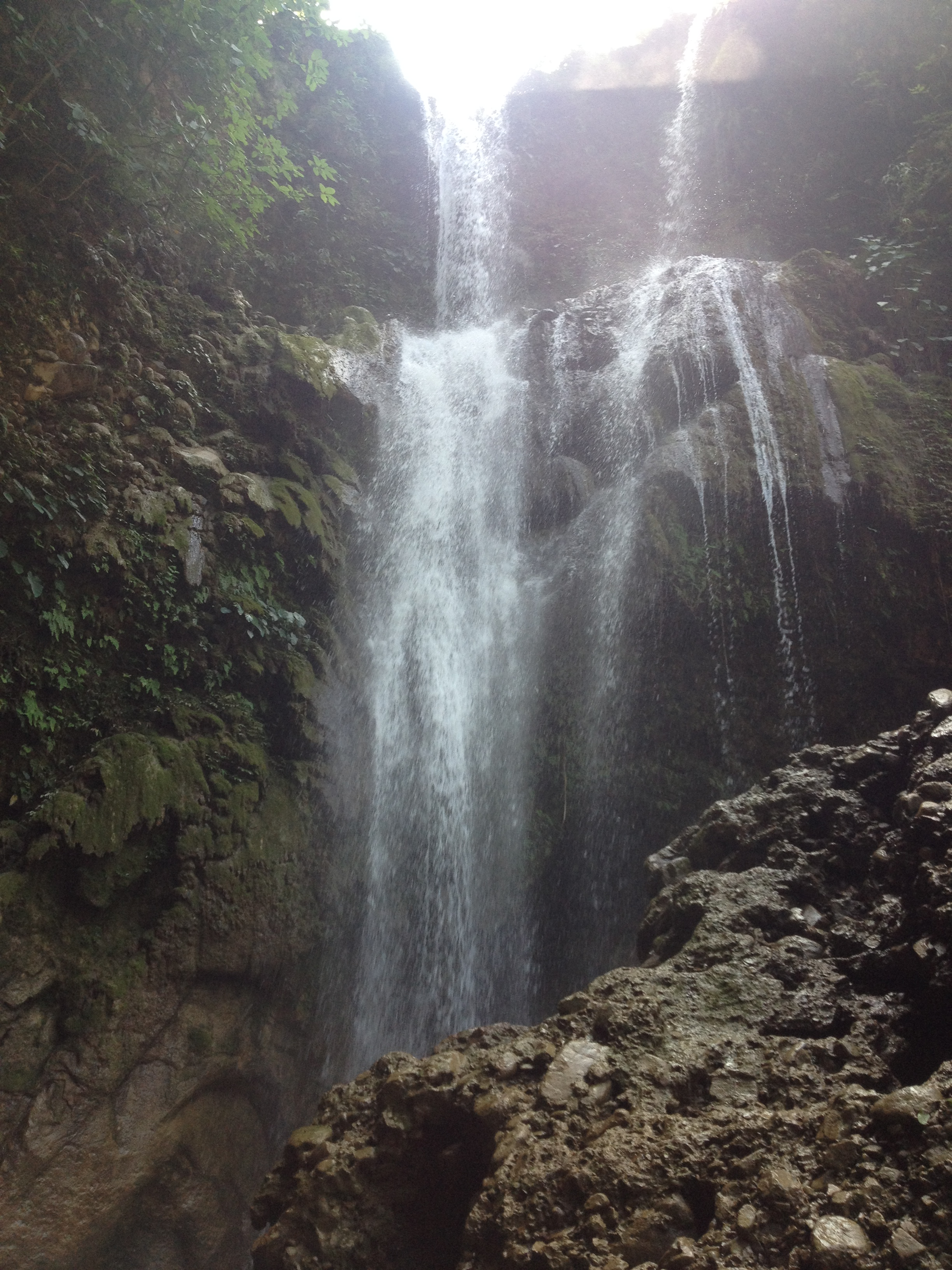

- Location within Nepal
- Location: dang district, Nepal
- Coordinates: 28°11′49″N 82°01′08″E
- Total height: 45 m (148 ft)
- Watercourse: Babai River

Purandhara waterfall (Nepali:पुरन्धारा झरना) is located in Babai Rural Municipality of Dang district near to Surkhet about 8 km west south of Hapure. The waterfall has a height of 45 m and its water is drained to the Babai River. According to the legend, there is a Jata of Shiva from which the water is flowing out.

Although the waterfall is one of the main touristic attraction of Dang district, insufficient conservation works is reported.

== See also ==
- List of waterfalls
- List of waterfalls of Nepal
