= Lekhjung Thapa =

Nepalese politician and neurologist

- लेखजंग थापा

Member of Parliament, Pratinidhi Sabha
- Incumbent
- Assumed office 26 March 2026
- Preceded by: Deepak Bohara
- Constituency: Rupandehi 3

Personal details
- Citizenship: Nepalese
- Party: Rastriya Swatantra Party
- Education: MD (Internal medicine); DM (neurology)
- Profession: Politician; Neurologist

Dr. Lekhjung Thapa (Note: Nepali: लेखजंग थापा) is a Nepalese politician and senior neurologist serving as a member of parliament from the Rastriya Swatantra Party. He is the member of the 7th Pratinidhi Sabha elected from Rupandehi 3 constituency in 2026 Nepalese General Election securing 58,814 votes and defeating Sushil Gurung of the Nepali Congress. He holds MD in internal medicine and DM in neurology. He serves as Senior Consultant Neurologist at the National Neuro Centre in Kathmandu and CEO of the Nepal Stroke Association, and the founder of Neuro and Allied Clinics in Bhairahawa.
