= Manju Khand =

Nepalese politician

Honourable Manju Khand
- मञ्जु खाँण

Member of Parliament, Pratinidhi Sabha
- Incumbent
- Assumed office 24 December 2022
- Constituency: Party List (Nepali Congress)

Personal details
- Party: Nepali Congress
- Spouse(s): Tej Bahadur Karki; Bal Krishna Khand

Manju Khand is a Nepalese politician, belonging to the Nepali Congress Party. She is currently serving as a member of the 2nd Federal Parliament of Nepal. In the 2022 Nepalese general election she was elected as a proportional representative from the Khas people category. She is second wife of politician Bal Krishna Khand.
