= Kamal Subedi =

Nepalese politician

- कमल सुवेदी
- Subedi at COP31 (2026)

Member of Parliament, Pratinidhi Sabha
- Incumbent
- Assumed office 26 March 2026
- Preceded by: Deepak Giri
- Constituency: Dang 3

Personal details
- Citizenship: Nepalese
- Party: Rastriya Swatantra Party
- Education: Political Science (MA)
- Alma mater: Tribhuvan University
- Profession: Politician; Associate professor

Kamal Subedi (Note: Nepali: कमल सुवेदी) is a Nepalese politician serving as a member of parliament from the Rastriya Swatantra Party. He is the member of the 7th Pratinidhi Sabha elected from Dang 3 constituency in 2026 Nepalese General Election securing 44,248 votes and defeating Deepak Giri of the Nepali Congress. He is the founding central president of National Federation of Youth NGO Nepal (NFYN). He served as associate professor at M. M. Campus Nepalgunj from 1995 till his retirement in 2021. He holds Master's degree in political science from Tribhuvan University.
