= Devendra Dahal =

Nepali politician

- देवेन्द्र दाहाल

Minister of Physical Infrastructure and Transport of Nepal
- In office 15 July 2024 – 9 September 2025
- President: Ram Chandra Poudel
- Prime Minister: Khadga Prasad Sharma Oli
- Preceded by: Raghubir Mahaseth
- Succeeded by: Kul Man Ghising

Member of the Parliament, National Assembly
- In office 4 March 2020 – 4 March 2026
- Preceded by: Haricharan Shiwakoti
- Succeeded by: Sunil Bahadur Thapa
- Constituency: Koshi Province

Personal details
- Born: 1 September 1958 (age 68) Kingdom of Nepal
- Party: Communist Party of Nepal (Unified Marxist-Leninist)
- Other political affiliations: Nepal Communist Party
- Spouse: Dila Maya Karki (Dahal)
- Children: 2
- Parents: Amar Bahadur Dahal (father); Mandara Deva Dahal (mother)

Devendra Dahal is a Nepalese politician, belonging to the CPN (Unified Marxist-Leninist) and former Minister of Physical Infrastructure and Transport of Nepal from 15 July 2024 to 9 September 2025. He also served as a Member of the Parliament from 4 March 2020 to 4 March 2026 in the National Assembly, the upper house of Nepal's Parliament, representing Koshi Province, he was elected in the 2020 Nepalese National Assembly election.

Dahal has been elected as the parliamentary party leader of the CPN (UML) in the Rastriya Sabha.
