= Rupandehi 2 =

Parliamentary constituency in Lumbini Province, Nepal

- Parliamentary constituency
- Rupandehi 2 in Lumbini Province
- Province: Lumbini Province
- District: Rupandehi District

Current constituency
- Created: 1991
- Party: Rastriya Swatantra Party
- Member of Parliament: Sulabh Kharel

Rupandehi 2 is one of three parliamentary constituencies of Rupandehi District in Nepal. This constituency came into existence on the Constituency Delimitation Commission (CDC) report submitted on 31 August 2017.

== Incorporated areas ==
Rupandehi 2 incorporates wards 1–4 of Sainamaina Municipality, wards 1–6 of Tilottama Municipality and wards 1–13 of Butwal Sub-metropolitan City.

== Assembly segments ==
It encompasses the following Lumbini Provincial Assembly segment

- Rupandehi 2(A)
- Rupandehi 2(B)

== Members of Parliament ==
=== Parliament/Constituent Assembly ===
| Election | Member | Party |
|---|---|---|
| 1991 | Ram Krishna Tamrakar | Nepali Congress |
| 1994 | Dhanpati Upadhyaya | CPN (Unified Marxist–Leninist) |
| 1997 by-election | Ghanashyam Bhusal | CPN (Unified Marxist–Leninist) |
| March 1998 | Ghanashyam Bhusal | CPN (Marxist–Leninist) |
| 1999 | Ram Krishna Tamrakar | Nepali Congress |
| 2008 | Om Prakash Yadav | Madheshi Janaadhikar Forum, Nepal |
| May 2011 | Om Prakash Yadav | Madheshi Janaahikar Forum (Republican) |
| 2013 | Deepak Bohara | Rastriya Prajatantra Party |
| August 2017 | Deepak Bohara | Rastriya Prajatantra Party (Democratic) |
| 2017 | Bishnu Prasad Paudel | CPN (Unified Marxist–Leninist) |
| May 2018 | Bishnu Prasad Paudel | Nepal Communist Party |
| 2022 | Bishnu Prasad Paudel | CPN (Unified Marxist–Leninist) |
| 2026 | Sulabh Kharel | Rastriya Swatantra Party |

=== Provincial Assembly ===
==== 2(A) ====
| Election | Member | Party |
|---|---|---|
| 2017 | Lila Giri | CPN (Unified Marxist-Leninist) |
| May 2018 | Lila Giri | Nepal Communist Party |

==== 2(B) ====
| Election | Member | Party |
|---|---|---|
| 2017 | Bhoj Prasad Shrestha | CPN (Unified Marxist-Leninist) |
| May 2018 | Bhoj Prasad Shrestha | Nepal Communist Party |

== Election results ==
=== Election in the 2020s ===
==== 2026 general election ====
| Candidate | Party | Votes | % |
|---|---|---|---|
| Sulabh Kharel | Rastriya Swatantra Party | 56,550 | 67.31 |
| Bishnu Prasad Paudel | CPN (UML) | 12,861 | 15.31 |
| Chunna Parsad Sharma | Nepali Congress | 9,392 | 11.18 |
| Shuvam Pandey | Nepali Communist Party | 1,409 | 1.68 |
| Bhim Bahadur Gautam | Shram Sanskriti Party | 1,336 | 1.59 |
| Others | | 2,465 | 2.93 |
| Total | | 84,013 | 100.00 |
| Majority | | 43,689 | |
| Rastriya Swatantra Party gain | | | |

==== 2022 general election ====
| Candidate | Party | Votes | % |
|---|---|---|---|
| Bishnu Prasad Paudel | CPN (UML) | 27,165 | 35.05 |
| Ganesh Paudel | Rastriya Swatantra Party | 25,795 | 33.28 |
| Keshav Bahadur Thapa Magar | Rastriya Janamukti Party | 22,027 | 28.42 |
| Roop Singh Thapa | Independent | 1,029 | 1.33 |
| Others | | 1,492 | 1.92 |
| Total | | 77,508 | 100.00 |
| Majority | | 1,370 | |
| CPN (UML) hold | | | |

=== Election in the 2017s ===
==== 2017 legislative elections ====
| Party | Candidate | Votes |
|---|---|---|
| CPN (Unified Marxist–Leninist) | Bishnu Prasad Paudel | 44,009 |
| Nepali Congress | Yuvraj Giri | 21,946 |
| Rastriya Janamukti Party | Ruk Bahadur Pun | 3,568 |
| Bibeksheel Sajha Party | Hari Krishna Adhikari | 1,323 |
| Others | | 1,628 |
| Invalid votes | | 1,819 |
| Result | CPN (UML) gain | |
Source: Election Commission

==== 2017 Nepalese provincial elections ====
===== 2(A) =====
| Party | Candidate | Votes |
|---|---|---|
| CPN (Unified Marxist–Leninist) | Lila Giri | 21,734 |
| Nepali Congress | Kaji Man Shrestha | 9,778 |
| Rastriya Janamukti Party | Chhatra Bahadur Darlami | 2,444 |
| Others | | 1,655 |
| Invalid votes | | 675 |
| Result | CPN (UML) gain | |
Source: Election Commission

===== 2(B) =====
| Party | Candidate | Votes |
|---|---|---|
| CPN (Unified Marxist–Leninist) | Bhoj Prasad Shrestha | 21,137 |
| Nepali Congress | Mahesh Man Singh | 12,568 |
| Rastriya Janamukti Party | Durga Bahadur Gharti Thapa Magar | 1,367 |
| Others | | 1,973 |
| Invalid votes | | 898 |
| Result | CPN (UML) gain | |
Source: Election Commission

==== 2013 Constituent Assembly election ====
| Party | Candidate | Votes |
|---|---|---|
| Rastriya Prajatantra Party | Deepak Bohora | 8,152 |
| Nepali Congress | Ram Krishna Tamrakar | 6,210 |
| Independent | Santosh Kumar Pandey | 5,608 |
| Madheshi Janaadhikar Forum, Nepal (Democratic) | Devi Prasad Chaudhary | 5,526 |
| CPN (Unified Marxist–Leninist) | Bharat Kumar Pokharel | 5,516 |
| UCPN (Maoist) | Binod Kumar Upadhyaya | 3,223 |
| Rastriya Janamukti Party | Surya KUmar Saru Magar | 2,595 |
| Terai Madhesh Loktantrik Party | Raytan Kumar Teli Gupta | 1,027 |
| Madheshi Janaadhikar Forum, Nepal | Ratna Kumar Teli | 1,023 |
| Others | | 3,856 |
| Result | RPP gain | |
Source: NepalNews

=== Election in the 2000s ===
==== 2008 Constituent Assembly election ====
| Party | Candidate | Votes |
|---|---|---|
| Madheshi Janaadhikar Forum, Nepal | Om Prakash Yadav | 10,612 |
| CPN (Unified Marxist–Leninist) | Devi Prasad Chaudhary | 9,829 |
| CPN (Maoist) | Binod Kumar Upadhyaya | 9,115 |
| Nepali Congress | Ram Krishna Tamrakar | 8,616 |
| Rastriya Janamukti Party | Yam Bahadur Thapa | 1,577 |
| Terai Madhesh Loktantrik Party | Raytan Kumar Teli Gupta | 1,317 |
| Independent | Ramu Yadav Ahir | 1,316 |
| Others | | 2,725 |
| Invalid votes | | 2,135 |
| Result | MJFN gain | |
Source: Election Commission

=== Election in the 1990s ===
==== 1999 legislative elections ====
| Party | Candidate | Votes |
|---|---|---|
| Nepali Congress | Ram Krishna Tamrakar | 14,441 |
| CPN (Unified Marxist–Leninist) | Lok Bahadur Budha Rana | 12,923 |
| Nepal Sadbhawana Party | Devi Prasad Chaudhary | 12,454 |
| Rastriya Janamukti Party | Hem Raj Thapa | 2,708 |
| Rastriya Prajatantra Party | Niranjan Kumar Thapa | 2,687 |
| CPN (Marxist–Leninist) | Ghanshyam Bhusal | 1,172 |
| Others | | 1,803 |
| Invalid votes | | 764 |
| Result | Congress gain | |
Source: Election Commission

===== 1997 by-elections =====
| Party | Candidate |
|---|---|
| CPN (Unified Marxist–Leninist) | Ghanshyam Bhusal |
| Others | |
| Result | CPN (UML) gain |
Source: Election Commission

==== 1994 legislative elections ====
| Party | Candidate | Votes |
|---|---|---|
| CPN (Unified Marxist–Leninist) | Dhanpati Upadhyaya | 13,571 |
| Nepali Congress | Ram Krishna Tamrakar | 10,850 |
| Rastriya Prajatantra Party | Chabbi Lal Bhusal | 6,873 |
| Nepal Sadbhavana Party | Satya Prasad Chaudhary | 5,578 |
| Rastriya Janamukti Party | Shri Prasad Gurung | 2,542 |
| Others | | 909 |
| Result | CPN (UML) gain | |
Source: Election Commission

==== 1991 legislative elections ====
| Party | Candidate | Votes |
|---|---|---|
| Nepali Congress | Ram Krishna Tamrakar | 11,689 |
| CPN (Unified Marxist–Leninist) | | 9,725 |
| Result | Congress gain | |

== See also ==
- List of parliamentary constituencies of Nepal
