= Kaligandaki =

Kaligandaki may refer to:

- Gandaki River, known as Kali Gandaki at its source
- Kaligandaki, Syangja, a rural municipality in Syangja district of Nepal
- Kaligandaki, Gulmi, a rural municipality in Gulmi district of Nepal
- Kaligandaki (TV series)
