= Suman Sharma Rayamajhi =

Nepalese politician

Honourable Suman Sharma Rayamajhi

Member of Lumbini Provincial Assembly
- Incumbent
- Assumed office 2022
- Constituency: Party list

Personal details
- Party: Janamat Party

Suman Sharma Rayamajhi is a Nepalese politician belonging to the Janamat Party. She is currently serving as a member of the Lumbini Provincial Assembly. In the 2022 Nepalese provincial election she was elected as a proportional representative from the Khas Arya category.
