= Hema Belbase =

Nepalese politician

Honourable Hema Belbase
- हेमा बेल्बासे

Member of Lumbini Provincial Assembly
- Incumbent
- Assumed office 2022
- Constituency: Party list

Personal details
- Party: Loktantrik Samajwadi Party, Nepal

Hema Belbase (Nepali: हेमा बेल्बासे) is a Nepalese politician belonging to the Loktantrik Samajwadi Party, Nepal. He is also a member of Lumbini Provincial Assembly for party list of the party.

Belbase is also the chief whip of the party in provincial assembly.
