= Kul Man Ghising =

Nepali politician and technocrat

Kulman Ghising
- कुलमान घिसिङ
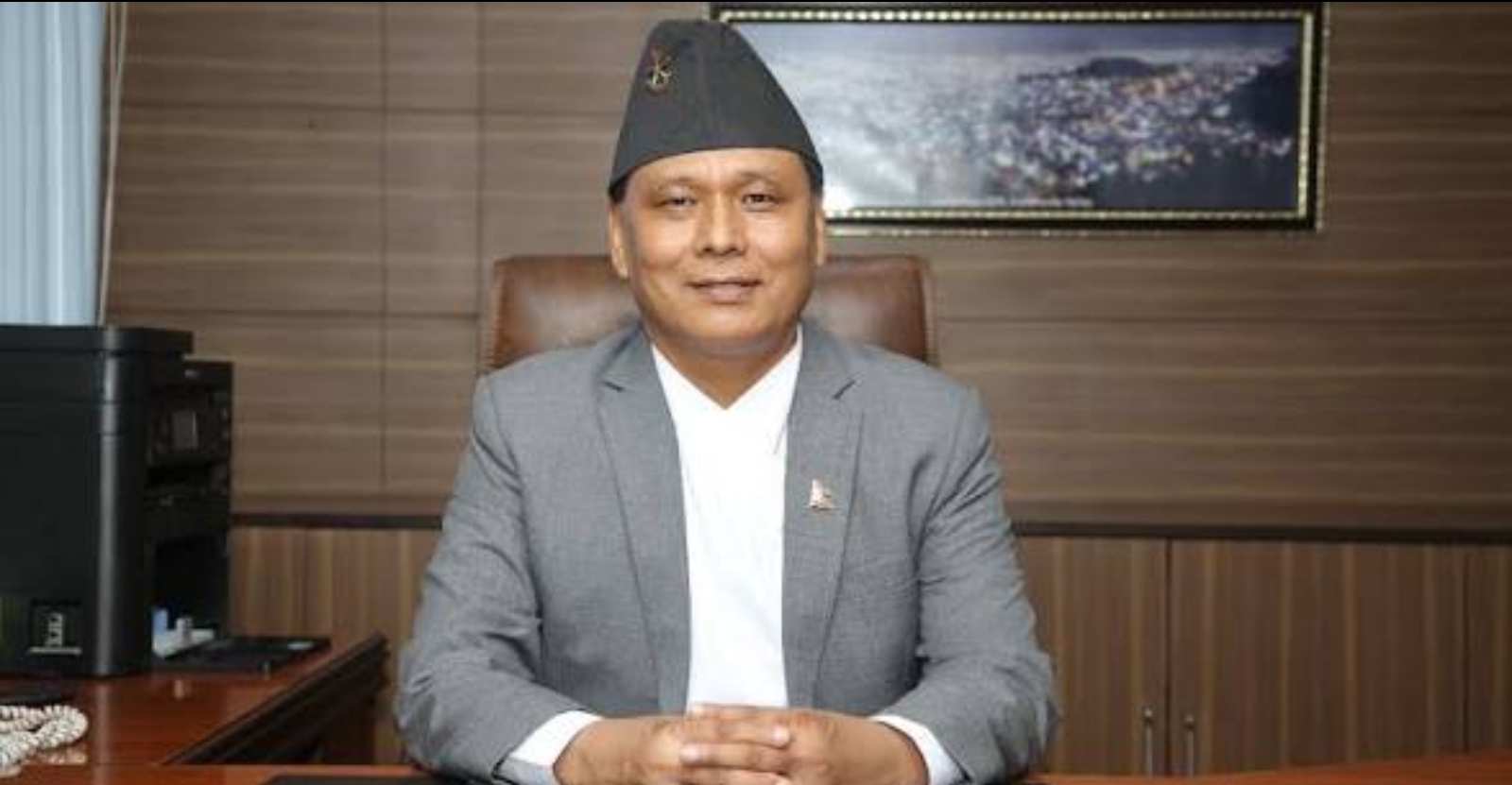

President of Ujyaalo Nepal Party
- Incumbent
- Assumed office 10 January 2026

Minister of Energy, Water Resources and Irrigation of Nepal
- In office 15 September 2025 – 7 January 2026
- President: Ram Chandra Poudel
- Prime Minister: Sushila Karki
- Preceded by: Deepak Khadka
- Succeeded by: Anil Kumar Sinha

Minister of Physical Infrastructure and Transport of Nepal
- In office 15 September 2025 – 7 January 2026
- President: Ram Chandra Poudel
- Prime Minister: Sushila Karki
- Preceded by: Devendra Dahal
- Succeeded by: Madhav Chaulagain

Minister of Urban Development of Nepal
- In office 15 September 2025 – 7 January 2026
- President: Ram Chandra Poudel
- Prime Minister: Sushila Karki
- Preceded by: Prakash Man Singh
- Succeeded by: Kumar Ingnam

Managing Director of Nepal Electricity Authority
- In office 11 August 2021 – 25 March 2025
- President: Bidya Devi Bhandari; Ram Chandra Poudel
- Prime Minister: Sher Bahadur Deuba; Pushpa Kamal Dahal
- Preceded by: Hitendra Dev Shakya
- Succeeded by: Hitendra Dev Shakya
- In office 14 September 2016 – 16 September 2020
- President: Bidhya Devi Bhandari
- Prime Minister: KP Sharma Oli
- Preceded by: Mukesh Raj Kafle
- Succeeded by: Lekhnath Koirala (acting)

Personal details
- Born: Kulman Ghising; November 25, 1970 (age 55) Bethan, Ramechhap, Nepal
- Party: Ujyaalo Nepal Party
- Spouse: Deepa Tamang
- Parent: Kripa Singh Ghising (father)
- Education: National Institute of Technology (BE); Tribhuvan University (ME); Pokhara University (MBA)
- Profession: Politician; Electrical engineer
- Known for: Ending load-shedding in Nepal

Kulman Ghising (Nepali: कुलमान घिसिङ, pronounced [ˈkulman ˈɡʱisiŋ]) is a Nepalese engineer, technocrat, politician, and chairman of Ujyaalo Nepal Party. Ghising served as minister of Energy, Water Resources and Irrigation along with Urban Development and Physical Infrastructure and Transport in interim cabinet formed after 2025 Nepalese Gen Z protests.

He has served as managing director of Nepal Electricity Authority for a decade, during his tenure the country's long-standing load-shedding (power outage) crisis ended.

Kulman Ghising, also served as the Nepal's Energy Minister and Chairperson of MCA-Nepal, the body implementing the Millennium Challenge Corporation (MCC) Compact. The MCC provides a U.S. grant for power and road projects. Ghising oversees project execution and board decisions. While the compact is promoted as supporting infrastructure growth, it has also faced debate in Nepal regarding sovereignty and foreign influence. He has served as managing director of Nepal Electricity Authority. He was MD of Nepal Electricity Authority during the tenure of Janardan Sharma when the country's long-standing load-shedding (power outage) ended.

== Early life and education ==
Ghising was born to a Tamang family in Bethan village of Ramechhap District in eastern Nepal, and went to Dahoo Secondary School as a child. He moved to Kathmandu and went to Balsewa Secondary School in Jhochhe, starting in the seventh grade. He graduated high school from Amar Adarsh Secondary School and went to Amrit Science College for the Intermediate degree. He received free scholarship from Regional Institute of Technology in Jamshedpur, India, to become an electrical engineer. He completed his post-graduate studies from Pulchowk Campus. Ghising then completed MBA from Pokhara University.

== Nepal Electricity Authority ==
Ghising started his job in NEA in 1994. He was appointed the managing director of NEA on 14 September 2016 by a cabinet decision having been recommended by Ram Sharan Mahat of Nepali Congress. He had been associated with NEA for over two decades prior to the appointment. At the time of the appointment, he was serving as the project chief of Rahughat Hydroelectricity Project, having been managing director of the Chilime Hydropower Company before that. Experienced in power trade and distribution, he said eliminating load shedding would be one of his main focus, in an interview following his appointment.

Scheduled daily power-cuts called load-shedding, extending up to 18 hours in the dry winter months, had been a persistent problem in Nepal for decades. When Ghising was appointed to lead the NEA, he emphasized better management and more equitable power distribution. By ending the policy of providing 24 hours uninterrupted power supply to a few large industries at the expense of the general public, he immediately eliminated power cuts in the major cities, and reduced power cuts to other parts of the country to around two hours every other day. He overhauled the hydropower generation system storing water during low demand hours, and bringing online power plants that had been inoperative due to poor maintenance. He launched a public awareness campaign to discourage the use of high-power domestic equipment during peak hours. Load-shedding was eliminated across the country, for both residential and industrial sectors by May 2018.

On August 11, 2021, Kulman Ghising was reappointed for his second term. However, he was removed from his position on March 24, 2025, despite his tenure being scheduled to end on August 9, 2025. The government decision to remove him caused widespread criticism and protests.

Kul Man Ghising's dismissal as managing director of the Nepal Electricity Authority on March 24, 2025, sparked protests across Nepal. Supporters criticized the government's decision, viewing it as unjust given his success in eliminating load-shedding. The protests revealed divisions within the ruling coalition, with even Nepali Congress leaders opposing the move, raising concerns about potential unrest.

== Early political career ==
Although Ghising was long considered a career technocrat, his entry into politics was preceded by years of immense public popularity stemming from his leadership at the Nepal Electricity Authority (NEA). Speculation regarding his formal entry into politics began as early as the 2022 general elections, where he was heavily courted by the CPN (Maoist Centre), though he initially maintained his neutral status as a public official.

Following the 2025 youth-led "Gen Z protests" that led to the resignation of the K. P. Sharma Oli administration, Ghising was inducted into the interim cabinet of Nepal's first female prime minister, Sushila Karki. Sworn in on September 15, 2025, Ghising was appointed Minister for Energy, Water Resources and Irrigation. Due to his reputation for administrative efficiency, he was also given the portfolios for the Ministry of Physical Infrastructure and Transport and the Ministry of Urban Development.

On January 7, 2026, Ghising resigned from his ministerial posts to transition into full-time party leadership ahead of the March 2026 general elections. Shortly after his resignation, he assumed the chairmanship of the "Ujyaalo Nepal Party" (Light of Nepal Party). Following a brief, 12-day unification attempt with the Rastriya Swatantra Party (RSP) that collapsed in January 2026 over ideological differences, Ghising announced he would contest the election independently for the seat of Kathmandu Constituency No. 3.

== See also ==
- Ujyaalo Nepal Party
- Harka Sampang
- Mahabir Pun
