= Chhabilal Bishwakarma =

Nepali politician

- छविलाल विश्वकर्मा

Member of Parliament, Pratinidhi Sabha
- In office 4 March 2018 – 12 September 2025
- Preceded by: Dip Kumar Upadhaya
- Succeeded by: Sunil Lamsal
- Constituency: Rupandehi 1

Personal details
- Born: 8 December 1962 (age 63)
- Party: CPN (UML)

Chhabilal Bishwakarma is a Nepali politician and was a member of the House of Representatives of the federal parliament of Nepal. He was elected under the first-past-the-post system from the Rupandehi-1 constituency, as a member of the CPN UML and a joint candidate of the left alliance.

In April 2007, he became one of the first two Nepali Dalits to become full ministers in the Nepali government. He was a member of CPN UML at the time.

Following the formation of Nepal Communist Party (NCP), he was elected to the Standing Committee of the party.
