= Gita Gurung =

Nepalese politician

Honourable Gita Gurung

Member of Lumbini Provincial Assembly
- Incumbent
- Assumed office 2022
- Constituency: Party list

Personal details
- Party: Janamat Party

Gita Gurung is a Nepalese politician belonging to the Janamat Party. She is currently serving as a member of the Lumbini Provincial Assembly. In the 2022 Nepalese provincial election she was elected as a proportional representative from the Indigenous category.
