= Bhagwati Adhikari =

Nepalese politician

Honourable Bhagwati Adhikari
- भगवती अधिकारी

Lumbini Provincial Assembly member
- Incumbent
- Assumed office 2022
- Preceded by: N/A
- Constituency: Party list

Personal details
- Party: CPN (Unified Socialist)
- Occupation: Politician

Bhagwati Adhikari (Nepali: भगवती अधिकारी) is a Nepalese politician and a member of Provincial Assembly of Lumbini Province from CPN (Unified Socialist). She was elected via 2022 Nepalese provincial elections from CPN (Unified Socialist) party list.
