= Naramaya Dhakal =

Nepali politician

- नरमाया ढकाल

Member of Lumbini Provincial Assembly
- Incumbent
- Assumed office 2022
- Constituency: Party list

Member of Parliament, Pratinidhi Sabha for Rastriya Janata Party list
- In office 2017–2022
- Constituency: Party list

Personal details
- Born: 20 January 1982 (age 44)
- Party: Nagrik Unmukti Party
- Other party: RJPN
- Nickname: Pragya

Nar Maya Dhakal is a Nepali politician and a member of Lumbini Provincial Assembly. Dhakal is former member of the House of Representatives of the federal parliament of Nepal. She was elected from Rastriya Janata Party Nepal under the proportional representation system.
