= Dangisharan Rural Municipality =

Dangisharan Rural Municipality दंगीशरण गाउँपालिका
- Gaunpalika
- Location in Nepal
- Coordinates: 28.096488°N 82.205211°E
- Country: Nepal
- Province: Lumbini Province
- District: Dang District

Area
  - Total: 110.71 km^{2} (42.75 sq mi)

Population
  - Total: 21,484
  - Density: 194.06/km^{2} (502.60/sq mi)
- Time zone: UTC+5:45 (Nepal Time)
- Website: http://dangisharanmun.gov.np/

Dangisharan Rural Municipality (Nepali : दंगीशरण गाउँपालिका) is a Gaunpalika in Dang District in Lumbini Province of Nepal. On 12 March 2017, the government of Nepal implemented a new local administrative structure, with the implementation of the new local administrative structure, VDCs have been replaced with municipal and Village Councils. Dangisharan is one of these 753 local units.

== Demographics ==
At the time of the 2011 Nepal census, Dangisharan Rural Municipality had a population of 21,484. Of these, 57.6% spoke Nepali, 42.1% Tharu, 0.1% Magar, 0.1% Tamang and 0.2% other languages as their first language.

In terms of ethnicity/caste, 45.6% were Tharu, 29.5% Chhetri, 4.9% Hill Brahmin, 4.7% Kami, 4.2% Magar, 3.9% Sanyasi/Dasnami, 3.0% Damai/Dholi, 1.9% Sarki, 0.8% Thakuri, 0.7% Badi, 0.2% Kumal, 0.2% Newar, 0.1% Tamang and 0.2% others.

In terms of religion, 99.3% were Hindu, 0.5% Christian, 0.1% Buddhist and 0.1% others.

In terms of literacy, 69.1% could read and write, 1.9% could only read and 28.9% could neither read nor write.
