= Deepak Bohara =

Nepalese politician (1951–2025)

- दिपक बोहरा

Member of Parliament, Pratinidhi Sabha
- In office 22 December 2022 – 1 April 2025
- Preceded by: Ghanashyam Bhusal
- Succeeded by: Lekhjung Thapa
- Constituency: Rupandehi 3

Member of 2nd Nepalese Constituent Assembly
- In office 21 January 2014 – 14 October 2017
- Preceded by: Om Prakash Yadav Gulzari
- Succeeded by: Bishnu Prasad Paudel
- Constituency: Rupandehi 2

Member of Rastriya Panchayat
- In office 1986–1990 Serving with Niranjan Thapa
- Constituency: Rupandehi

Personal details
- Born: 31 March 1951 Rupandehi, Nepal
- Died: 1 April 2025 (aged 74) Kathmandu, Nepal
- Party: RPP
- Other political affiliations: RPP (D)

Deepak Bohara (Nepali: दिपक बोहरा; 31 March 1951 – 1 April 2025) was a Nepalese politician and member of the Rastriya Prajatantra Party. He was elected in 2022 from Rupandehi 3 to the House of Representatives.

== Political career ==
Bohora was active in Nepalese politics for four decades as a member of the Rastriya Prajatantra Party. In 1979, he was elected as a member of the National Panchayat from Rupandehi. He was appointed Assistant Tourism Minister in 1982, and was promoted to State Minister for Tourism in 1984. He was also victorious in the 1985 National Panchayat elections. In 2013, he was elected as a member of the Constituent Assembly from Rupandehi Constituency No. 2.

=== 2013 election ===
In the 2008 Constituent Assembly election, Bohora was defeated in Rupandehi-1 by Ghan Shyam Yadav Ahir of the Maoist Center. However, in the 2013 Constituent Assembly election, he won from Constituency No. 2, defeating Ram Krishna Tamrakar of the Nepali Congress.

=== 2017 election ===
In the 2017 House of Representatives election, Bohora was defeated by Ghanashyam Bhusal of the CPN-UML. Bhusal had the support of the Maoist Center, while Bohora was backed by the Nepali Congress. In this election, Bohora secured 27,422 votes, challenging the strong left alliance candidate Bhusal, who won with 32,000 votes.

=== 2022 election ===
Despite having been diagnosed with throat cancer, he successfully contested the election. His condition rendered him unable to speak, he was able to communicate through fellow RPP lawmakers in Parliament.

== Corruption scandal ==
Bohora was implicated in corruption involving the land procurement by the state-owned Nepal Oil Corporation. A parliamentary inquiry into the land deal concluded that as Minister of Supplies, Bohora had embezzled over Rs 1.5 billion from landowners in Jhapa, Sarlahi, Chitwan and Bhairahawa, who had received less than Rs 500 million in total for their land although the NOC had disbursed Rs 2 billion.

== Death ==
Bohara died in Kathmandu on 1 April 2025, a day after his 74th birthday. He had been experiencing health issues since contracting COVID-19 in 2020. Though he recovered, the virus left him with serious throat issues that progressively worsened. He was later diagnosed with throat cancer. Bohara is survived by his two wives, Manju and Unnati Shila, and his two sons, Gaurav and Prajwal. He also had a daughter, who died in 2024.
