= Surya Prasad Pradhan =

Nepali politician

8th Mayor of Butwal
- In office 1992–1996
- Preceded by: Brijman Shrestha
- Succeeded by: Bhoj Prasad Shrestha

Personal details
- Party: Nepali Congress

Surya Prasad Pradhan is a Nepalese politician. He was elected to the Pratinidhi Sabha in the 1999 election on behalf of the Nepali Congress. Pradhan is the NC candidate in the Rupandehi-4 constituency for the 2008 Constituent Assembly election.
