= Ujyaalo Nepal Party =

Centre-left political party in Nepal

Ujyalo Nepal Party उज्यालो नेपाल पार्टी
- Abbreviation: UNP
- Leader: Anup Kumar Upadhyaya
- President: Kul Man Ghising
- General Secretary: Dharma Bahadur Chaudhary
- Spokesperson: Shreeram Gurung
- Vice-President: Dr. Mahendra Lawati
- Secretary: Rameshwor Shrestha; Sumi Moktan; Jitram Lama; Kedar Khadka
- Treasurer: Bhagwati Kakshapati
- Founder: Kul Man Ghising, Anup Kumar Upadhyaya
- Founded: 21 November 2025; 11 months ago
- Legalised: 25 November 2025
- Headquarters: Tripureshwor, Kathmandu
- Youth wing: Ujyaalo Nepal Youth Front
- Ideology: Democratic socialism
- Political position: Centre-left
- Colours: Irish Green and Amber
- Slogan: "Bright Nepal for a bright future" "उज्यालो भविष्यका लागि, उज्यालो नेपाल"
- Seats in Pratinidhi Sabha: 0 / 275
- Seats in Rastriya Sabha: 0 / 59
- Mayors/Chairs: 0 / 753

Election symbol
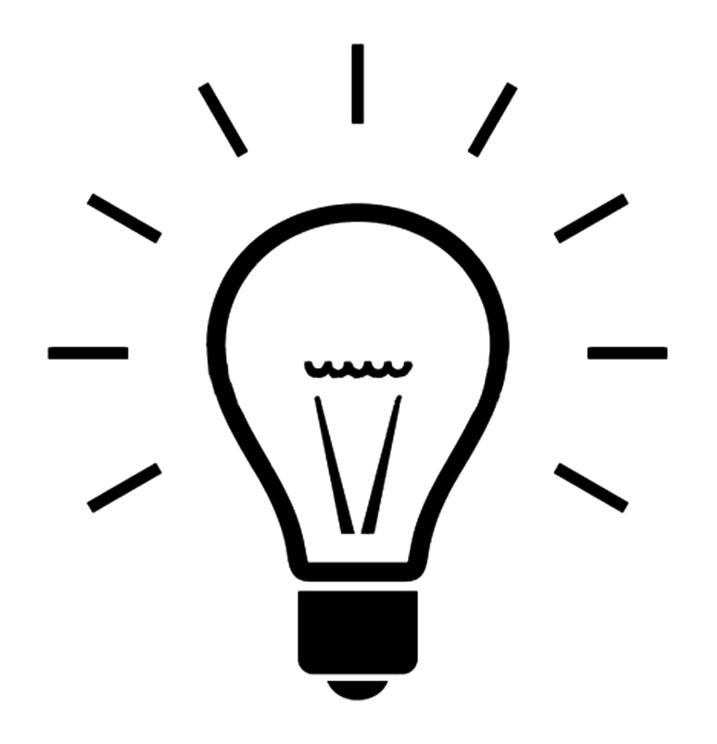
- skin-invert Nepali: बलिरहेको बिजुलीको चिम, lit. 'A burning electric bulb'

Party flag

Website
- www.unp.org.np

The Ujyaalo Nepal Party (UNP; Nepali: उज्यालो नेपाल पार्टी, lit. 'Bright Nepal Party' [ud͡zjɑːlo neˈpal paʈi]) is a political party in Nepal. Established in November 2025 following the Nepalese Gen Z protests, the party is chaired by former Nepal Electricity Authority managing director and former minister of Energy, Water Resources and Irrigation Kul Man Ghising. The party advocates governance reform, economic development and anti-corruption measures.

== History ==
=== Formation ===
The party was formed in the aftermath of 2025 Nepalese Gen Z protests. Led initially by former energy secretary Anup Kumar Upadhyay was joined upon by numerous doctors, professors and engineers throughout the nation. Ghising later resigned on 7 January 2026, as minister to join the party. The party announced merger with Rastriya Swatantra Party which failed within 12 days. The latter removed candidates of UNP from proportional list after which it added its proportional candidates to Rastriya Pariwartan Party proportional list. The party nominated Kul Man Ghising as its chairman. After circumstances, party stood its candidates in 120 constituencies for FPTP election with Kul Man Ghising himself as candidate from Kathmandu 3 (constituency).

== Election results ==
The party contested and fielded 120 candidates for the First Past the Post seats in the 2026 general election. The party uses bulb as its election symbol for FPtP.

For the 2026 general election, the party initially merged its proportional representation (PR) list with the Rastriya Swatantra Party, but the alliance dissolved following a dispute over candidate placement.

The Ujyaalo Nepal Party subsequently partnered with the Rastriya Pariwartan Party on January 12, 2026, contesting the PR category under the latter's name and flute election symbol.

Election	Leader	Constituency votes			Party list votes			Seats	±	Sitting side
Election	Leader	No.	%	±	No.	%	±	Seats	±	Sitting side
2026 (debut)	Kul Man Ghising	115,975	1.10	New entry	172,489^	1.59	New entry	0 / 275	New entry	Steady

- ^ The Ujyaalo Nepal Party partnered with the Rastriya Pariwartan Party on January 12, 2026, contesting the PR category under the latter's name and flute election symbol.

== Leadership ==
=== Party President ===
No.	Party President	Portrait	Term of office	
1	Anup Kumar Upadhyay		21 November 2025	10 January 2026
2	Kul Man Ghising		10 January 2026	Incumbent

== See also ==
- List of political parties in Nepal
- Shram Sanskriti Party
