= Shantinagar Rural Municipality =

Shantinagar शान्तिनगर
- Rural municipality
- Location in Nepal
- Coordinates: 28.19°N 82.23°E
- Country: Nepal
- Province: Lumbini Province
- District: Dang District

Population (1991)
  - Total: 8,854
- Time zone: UTC+5:45 (Nepal Time)
- Website: https://shantinagarmun.gov.np/

Shantinagar is a town and a Rural municipality in Dang District in Lumbini Province of south-western Nepal. At the time of the 1991 Nepal census it had a population of 8,854.

== Demographics ==
At the time of the 2011 Nepal census Shantinagar Rural Municipality had a population of 25,203. Of these, 81.0% spoke Nepali, 16.9% Tharu, 2.0% Magar, 0.1% Chantyal and 0.1% other languages as their first language.

In terms of ethnicity/caste, 43.3% were Chhetri, 17.6% Tharu, 13.4% Magar, 10.0% Kami, 7.2% Hill Brahmin, 2.1% Damai/Dholi, 1.5% Sanyasi/Dasnami, 1.5% Thakuri, 0.8% Musalman, 0.8% Sarki, 0.6% other Dalit, 0.3% Newar, 0.2% Badi, 0.1% Chhantyal, 0.1% Gaine, 0.1% Kumal, 0.1% other Terai and 0.2% others.

In terms of religion, 96.8% were Hindu, 1.4% Buddhist, 1.0% Christian, 0.8% Muslim and 0.1% others.

In terms of literacy, 66.6% could read and write, 1.9% could only read and 31.5% could neither read nor write.
