= Modanath Prasrit =

Nepali author and politician (born 1942)

- मोदनाथ प्रश्रित
- Born: Modanath Paudel; 20 June 1942 (age 84); Harrabote, Khidim, Arghakhanchi, Kingdom of Nepal
- Education: Master's Degree (Nepali), Acharya (Ayurveda)
- Occupations: writer, poet, politician, political activist, social commentator, cultural commentator, Ayurvedic Practitioner
- Parents: Ghanashyam Paudel (father); Balikadevi (mother)
- Awards: Madan Puraskar, 2023 B.S. Ujjwal Kirtimaya Rashtradeep (second class)
- Writing career
- Other name: Prasrit
- Notable works: Maanav (Long Poem); Aamaka Aansu (Collection of poems); Devasur Sangram (Epic); Golagharko Sandesh (Long poem)

Member of Parliament
- In office 1994–1999
- Constituency: Rupandehi Area 3

Minister of Education
- In office 2054 BS – 2055 BS
- Monarch: Birendra
- Prime Minister: Man Mohan Adhikari

Personal details
- Party: Nepal Communist Party
- Other political affiliations: CPN-UML (until 2018); Nepali Congress(until 2019 BS)

Modanath Prasrit, also Modnath Prasrit (Nepali: मोदनाथ प्रश्रित; born 20 June 1942) is a Nepali writer, politician and political activist. A long time member of the Nepali communist movement, he became the Minister of Education in 2054 BS (A.D. none). His writings reflect his communist ideology. His book Devasur Sangram (Translation: War between Gods and Demons) is particularly noted for its challenge to Hindu orthodoxy.

== Biography ==
Prasrit was born Modanath Paudel on 20 June 1942, in Khidim, Arghakhanchi, to Ghanashyam Paudel and Balikadevi. He has Master's degree in Nepali language and a title of 'Acharya' in Ayurvedic Medicine. He was awarded the Madan Puraskar for Nepali literature in 2023 B.S. (1966–67 A.D.) for the epic Maanav. He has continued to publish a prolific list of works in literature and socio-political commentary since then. Prasrit was an important intellectual figure in the Nepali struggle for Democracy during the Panchayat rule.

== Political views ==
Modanath Prasrit is generally considered a "progressive" writer, although some within the movement claim he has joined the "reactionary" camp in recent years. He has surprised many with his stance for reinstating Nepal as a Hindu nation, reverting secularism, while also opining that there was no justification for a Hindu state in the first place. He has also shown a soft spot for traditional Hindu poets like Bhanubhakta Acharya

== List of works ==
He has published a total of 2 epic poems, 2 long poems and 235 poems and songs in total. In addition, he regularly contributes his social, cultural and political commentary on newspapers, magazines, talk shows and conferences.

Type	Year (BS)	Title
Collection of poems	2019	Aamaka Aansu
Long poem	2020	Buba khai?
Long poem	2023	Maanav
Epic	2030	Devasur Sangram
Long poem	2039	Golagharko Sandesh
Collection of poems	2039	Sahidko Ragat
Collection of songs	2049	Jaba chalchha huri
Collection of songs and poems	2058	Sankalit Rachana

== Awards ==
In 2014, he was awarded the Ujjwal Kirtimaya Rashtradeep (second class), a national honour, by a cabinet decision, for his contributions to society.
