= Raju Khanal =

Nepali politician

Personal details
- Party: Nepali Congress

Raju Khanal (Nepali: राजु खनाल) is a member of the 2nd Nepalese Constituent Assembly. He won Dang–3 seat in the 2013 Nepalese Constituent Assembly election from the Nepali Congress. His son, Gaurav Khanal, studies in Sydney.
