= Rastriya Janamukti Party =

National People's Liberation Party राष्ट्रिय जनमुक्ति पार्टी
- President: K.P Palungwa Limbu
- General Secretary: Top Aslami Magar, Padam Bahadur Limbu, Ram Bahadur Pariyar
- Executive President: Keshav Suryavanshi
- Founder: Malabar Singh Thapa; Gore Bahadur Khapangi
- Founded: May 4, 1990 Nepal Rastriya Janamukti Morcha; January 20, 1992 Rastriya Janamukti Party
- Headquarters: Maharajgunj, Kathmandu
- Student wing: Nepal Bidhyarthi Morcha
- Youth wing: Janamukti Youth Federation
- Women's wing: Rastriya Mahila Morcha
- Ex-army wing: Rastriya Purba Sainik Sangh
- Cultural wing: Bahujatiya Sanskritik Morcha
- Ideology: Federalism; Welfare capitalism Secularism; Liberalism
- Political position: Centre-left

Election symbol
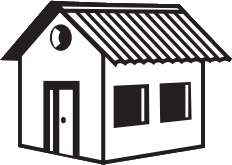

Party flag
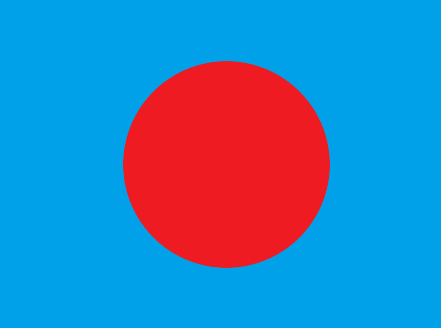

Website
- www.janamukti.org

Rastriya Janamukti Party (Nepali: राष्ट्रिय जनमुक्ति पार्टी; translation: National People's Liberation Party) is a political party in Nepal. The party was founded on 6 May 1990 as Nepal Rastriya Janamukti Morcha. After unification with Rastriya Jana Party on 20 January 1992, the unified party adopted the name, Rastriya Janamukti Party.

== History ==
=== Foundation (1990-1992) ===
The Nepal Rastriya Janamukti Morcha Party was founded in Kathmandu on 6 May 1990. The party contested the 1991 general elections with a man as their electoral symbol. The party merged with Rastriya Jana Party on 20 January 1992 and renamed itself, Rastriya Janamukti Party also adopting a house as its electoral symbol.

=== First General Convention (1996-1999) ===
The party's first General Convention was held in Kathmandu from 10 June to 12 June 1996. The general convention elected Malbar Singh Thapa as the party's first president and Gore Bahadur Khapangi as the party's first general secretary.

In the 1999 parliamentary election, the Rastriya Janamukti Party fielded 130 candidates and got 92,567 votes but none of their candidates were elected. During the party's second General Convention in Butwal, Malbar Singh Thapa and Gore Bahadur Khapangi were reelected to their posts.

=== Constituent Assembly (2006-2015) ===
The party held its third General Convention in Lalitpur from 3 March to 5 March 2006. Malbar Singh Thapa was reelected as the party's president and Bayan Singh Rai was elected as the general secretary. The party contested the 2008 Constituent Assembly election and won 2 seats through proportional representation.

The party then held its fourth General Convention in Kawasoti and Malbar Singh Thapa was reelected party president and Keshav Suryavanshi was elected general secretary. In the 2013 Constituent Assembly election, the party again won 2 seats through proportional representation.

The two members in the Constituent Assembly, Shiva Lal Thapa and Sima Kumari BK, quit the party on 2 March 2015 and announced the formation of Rastriya Janamukti Party (Loktantrik).

=== Federal Nepal (2016-present) ===
In the party's fifth General Convention in Lalitpur, Khadga Prasad Palungwa Limbu was elected president and Keshav Suryavanshi was elected general secretary. The party contested the 2017 local elections and won 22 seats in local level. The party also contested the 2017 legislative and provincial elections but did not win any seats. President Limbu in Ilam-2 and General Secretary Suryavanshi in Rupandhye-2 both failed to get elected . In 2022 local elections party won only 7 seats. Party clean swiped Mangsebong ward no.5 of Ilam .

== Electoral performance ==
=== Nepalese legislative elections ===
Election	Leader	Votes			Seats		Position	Resulting government
Election	Leader	#	%	+/-	#	+/-	Position	Resulting government
1991	Malabar Singh Thapa	34,509	0.47		0 / 205		9th	Extra parliamentary
1994	Malabar Singh Thapa	79,996	1.05	▲0.58	0 / 205	Steady	▲6th	Extra parliamentary
1999	Malabar Singh Thapa	92,567	1.07	▲0.02	0 / 205	Steady	▼10th	Extra parliamentary
2008	Malabar Singh Thapa	53,910	0.50	▼0.57	2 / 575	▲2	▼17th	Opposition
2013	Malabar Singh Thapa	63,834	0.67	▲0.17	2 / 575	Steady	▲16th	Opposition
2017	Khadga Prasad Palungwa	33,091	0.35	▼0.32	0 / 275	▼2	▲14th	Extra parliamentary
2022	Keshav Suryavanshi	34,012	0.32	▼0.03	0 / 275	Steady	▼17th	Extra parliamentary

== Sister organizations ==
The sister organizations of the Party are called Jana Sangathan (People's Organization). According to the RJP central office, the following are the current sister organizations:

- Janamukti Youth Federation
- Rastriya Mahila Morcha
- Rastriya Dalit Morcha
- Rastriya Purva Sainik Sangathan
- Nepal Aadibasi Mahasangh
- Nepal Bidhyarthi Morcha
- Rastriya Muslim Parisad
- Bahujatiya Sanskritik Morcha
- Rastriya Bhumihin-Sukumbasi Adhikar Manch
- Rastriya Tharu Manch Nepal
- Khas arya Rastriya Manch Nepal

In addition, teachers, intellectuals, athletes, transport entrepreneurs, and communication/media-related organizations are parties which are closely aligned with Janamukti Thought.

== Leadership ==
=== List of presidents (1992–present) ===
#	Presidents	Portrait	Term start	Term end	Notes
1	Malabar Singh Thapa		20 January 1992	10 June 2016	Founder, elected by the First General Convention
2	Khadga Prasad Palungwa Limbu		12 June 2016	Incumbent	Elected by the Fifth General Convention.
3	Keshav Suryavanshi (Executive President)		13 September 2021	Incumbent	Elected by the Sixth General Convention.

=== List of general secretaries (1992–present) ===
#	General Secretary	Portrait	Term start	Term end	Notes
1	Gore Bahadur Khapangi		20 January 1992	2 March 2006	Founder, elected by the First General Convention.
2	Bayan Singh Rai		5 March 2006	8 March 2011	Elected by the Third General Convention.
3	Keshav Suryavanshi		13 March 2011	13 September 2021	Elected by the Fourth and Fifth General Convention.
4	Top Aslami Magar		13 September 2021	Incumbent	Elected by the Sixth General Convention.
4	Ram Bahadur Pariyar		13 September 2021	Incumbent	Elected by the Sixth General Convention.
4	Padam Bahadur Limbu		13 September 2021	Incumbent	Elected by the Sixth General Convention.
