= Sisautiya =

Sisautiya Sisautiya Madhopur
- Village development committee
- Location in Nepal
- Coordinates: 26°53′0″N 85°28′0″E
- Country: Nepal
- Province: Madhesh Province
- District: Sarlahi District

Population (2011)
  - Total: 13,729
- Time zone: UTC+5:45 (Nepal Time)
- Postal code: 45800
- Area code: 046

Sisautiya सिसौटिया (or sometimes Sisotiya) is a small and most populated village in the southernmost part of Nepal commonly known as Madhesh or Terai. Sisautiya is 9 km north of the Indian border, 18 km south from Brahathawa municipality 9 km west from district headquarters Malangawa. It is located at 26°52'0N 85°34'0E with an altitude of 79 metres(262 feet) There is a customs checkpoint at the border crossing. It is part of the Sarlahi district and Province No. 2. It forms the main part of the Sisautiya village development committee. At the time of the 2011 Nepal census it had a population of 13,729 people living in 2259 individual households.

== Demographics ==
At the time of the 2011 Nepal census it had a population of 13,729 people residing in 2,259 individual households. People here lives are Madhesi (Mandal, Jha, Yadav, Patel, Raut, Thakur, Shah, Chaudhary, Ram, Baitha, and Mahato) and few Phadi.

== Geographical ==
It is situated in the Terai Region of Sarlahi district and Zone Janakpur. It is situated 35 km south from Mahendra Highway Nayaroad. There are 4 parliamentary constituenciesparliamentary constituencies and 8 sub- in Sarlahi. Sisautiya is in area 4(A).

== Borders ==
- North – Belhi
- North - Dhangadha
- South – Godeta
- South– Bagdaha and Ramban
- East - Sundarpur and Laxmipur
- West – Dhanakaul Purba
- West – Sikhauna

== Education ==
There are various institutions in order to provide quality education.

- Shree Narayan Hari Secondary School Sisautiya-10
- Shree Janta Primary School, Sisautiya-09,Madhopur
- Shree V.K.J Primary School, Sisautiya-01
- Bright Future English Boarding School, Sisautiya-05

== Media ==
The major daily newspapers are:

- Madhesh Post
- Loktantrik
- Sarlahi Times

== 2015 Earthquake Nepal ==
Sisautiya shook during an earthquake on 12 May 2015. However, the VDC did suffer few damage.

== Transport ==
- Road: Sisautiya is roughly 198 km by road from Kathmandu. It is also well connected to other parts of the district by Bus Services.
