= Brahmapuri, Sarlahi =

Rural Municipality in Sarlahi district, Nepal

Brahmapuri Rural Municipality ब्रह्मपुरी गाउँपालिका
- Rural Municipality
- Location in province Brahmapuri Rural Municipality (Nepal)
- Coordinates: 26.89°N 85.57°E
- Country: Nepal
- Province: Madhesh Province
- District: Sarlahi District
- Established: 2016 A.D. (2073 B.S.)

Government
  - Type: Village council
  - Chairperson: Ram Padarath Sah Teli

Area
  - Total: 40.56 km^{2} (15.66 sq mi)

Population (2011)
  - Total: 36,169
  - Density: 891.7/km^{2} (2,310/sq mi)
  - Religions: Hindu Muslim

Languages
  - Local: Bajjika, Nepali
- Time zone: UTC+5:45 (NPT)
- Postal Code: 45800
- Area code: 046
- Website: https://brahmapurimun.gov.np/

Brahmapuri (Nepali: ब्रह्मपुरी) is a rural municipality in Sarlahi District, a part of Madhesh Province in the eastern Terai region of Nepal. It was formed in 2016, occupying current 7 sections (wards) from former VDCs: Brahmapuri, Bhelhi, Tribhuwananagar and Nokailwa. It occupies an area of 40.56 km^{2} with a total population of 39,169. It is bounded by Parsa rural municipality and Haripurwa municipality in the east, Chandranagar rural municipality and Ishworpur municipality in the north, Malangwa and Kabilasi municipalities in the west, and Sitamarhi district of the Indian state of Bihar in the south. There are a total of 7 wards in this rural municipality. The main occupation is agriculture and farming.
