= List of monuments in Sarlahi, Nepal =

This is a list of monuments in Sarlahi District, Nepal as officially recognized by and available through the website of the Department of Archaeology, Nepal.

Sarlahi is a district of Province No. 2 bordered to the west with Bagmati River. The Ancient Monument Protection Act of Nepal 1956 has defined monuments as structure older than 100 years and having historical, cultural importance. According to Nepal Census 2011 about 85.56% people follow Hindu religion in this district. So as the population the monumental sites of this district is dominated by Hindu temples and shrines. Among all the monuments Murtiya is a ruin of unidentified temple.

== List of monuments ==
ID	Name	Type	Location	District	Coordinates	Image
NP-SAR-01	Jalakeshwor Mahadev		Pattharkot	Sarlahi	27°04′17″N 85°39′11″E	Upload Photo Upload Photo
NP-SAR-02	Sarlahi Devi Temple		Hempur	Sarlahi	26°57′09″N 85°30′48″E	Upload Photo Upload Photo
NP-SAR-03	Tarkeshwor Mahadev Temple		Malangawa	Sarlahi	26°51′18″N 85°33′32″E	Upload Photo Upload Photo
NP-SAR-04	Jungamukteswar Temple		haripur-4, Haraiya	Sarlahi		Upload Photo Upload Photo
NP-SAR-05	Sant Malang Baba Temple		Malangwa	Sarlahi		Upload Photo Upload Photo
NP-SAR-06	Murtiya Archeological Site		Murtiya -3	Sarlahi	27°01′40″N 85°28′56″E	Upload Photo Upload Photo

== See also ==
- List of monuments in Province No. 2
- List of monuments in Nepal
