= Pipariya, Sarlahi =

Pipariya पिपरिया
- Village development committee
- Location in Nepal
- Coordinates: 26°58′44″N 85°31′50″E
- Country: Nepal
- Zone: Janakpur Zone
- District: Sarlahi District

Population (2011)
  - Total: 6,991
  - Density: 389/km^{2} (1,010/sq mi)
- Census

Languages
  - Official: Maithili, Nepali
- Time zone: UTC+5:45 (Nepal Time)
- Area code: 046
- Vehicle registration: JA-1-P

Pipariya is a village development committee in Sarlahi District in the Janakpur Zone of south-eastern Nepal. At present it's part of Kabilasi Municipality. It includes 2 wards of Kabilasi i.e. 1&2. According to the CBS 2011 it is carrying 1,218 households and total population 6,991 including 3,581 males and 3,410 females.

== Demographics ==
At the time of the 2011 Nepal census it had a population of 6,911 people residing in 1,218 individual households including 3,581 males and 3,410 females.

== Geographical ==
It is located in the Terai Region of Sarlahi District and Janakpur Zone. It is a VDC of Sarlahi District. It is situated 12 km south from Mahendra Highway, Nawalpur. It has fertile land for cultivation, chief crops grown here are sugarcane, paddy, wheat, pulses, etc. It has good irrigation facilities but can be made even better. Lakhandei River surrounds it from west and a stream called Dhangra from east. There is jungle just beside Lakhandei River. The jungle is now Community Forest. There are 6 parliamentary constituency in Sarlahi District. Pipariya falls under area 2.

== Border ==
- North – Pidari VDC 1 km
- South – Rahaniya, Sarlahi 2 km
- East - Gair, Kabilasi VDC 4 km
- East – Haraiya, Farahadawa VDC, 3 km
- West – Gangapur & Tikuliya Separated by Lakhandei River.

== Education ==
There are Government and Private institutions in order to provide quality education.

- Shree Bal Govind Janta Uchha Madhyamik Vidyalaya.

It was established in 2017 B.S.

- Sunrise English Boarding School
- K.D.S
- Madarsha
- Pancharatna English Boarding school

== HealthCare ==
- Pipariya Sub-health Post
