= Bishnu Rural Municipality =

Bishnu विष्णु
- Rural Municipality
- Location in Nepal
- Coordinates: 26.82°N 85.37°E
- Country: Nepal
- Development Region: Central
- District: Sarlahi District
- Province: Province No. 2
- Established: 2016 A.D. (2073 B.S.)

Government
  - Mayor: Mr. Jawahar Lal Yadav Nepali Congress
  - Deputy Mayor: Usha Devi Nepali Congress

Area
  - Total: 28.08 km^{2} (10.84 sq mi)

Population (2011)
  - Total: 24,748
  - Density: 881.3/km^{2} (2,283/sq mi)
  - Religions: Hindu Muslim Christian

Languages
  - Local: Maithili, Tharu, Nepali
- Time zone: UTC+5:45 (NST)
- Postal Code: 45800
- Area code: 046
- Website: http://www.bishnumun.gov.np/

Bishnu (Nepali: विष्णु) is a rural municipality in Sarlahi District, a part of Province No. 2 in Nepal. It was formed in 2016 occupying current 8 sections (wards) from previous 4 former VDCs including Simara, Bara Udhoran, Madhubangoth and Batraul. It occupies an area of 28.09 km^{2} with a total population of 24,748.
