= Aashiq Ali Mikrani =

- Born: Malangawa of Sarlahi District
- Died: 4 February 2007; Malangawa of Sarlahi District
- Movement: Madhesh movement

Aashiq Ali Mikrani (Nepali: आशिक अलि मिकरानी) was one of the thirty Madheshi martyrs of the Terai/Madhes movement of 2007 and 2008. He was killed during the Madhesh movement in 2007, along with 26 others; 6 more were killed in the second Madhesh movement agitation of 2008.

The government of Nepal declared those killed during the agitations as martyrs, as per the agreement with the United Democratic Madhesi Front on 10 March 2008.

== Early life ==
Mikrani was born in Malangawa Municipality-4 of Sarlahi District to Abdul Wahab Mikrani and Roshan Ara Mikrani and was 16 at the time of his martyrdom.

== Martyr day ==
On 4 February 2007, during the first Madheshi agitation, he was representing the activists of Madhesi People's Rights Forum. A police action against the agitating activists in Malangawa of Sarlahi district took his life. The police resorted to firing after he staged demonstration, defying the curfew with Ram Narayan Shah of Salempur Village Development Committee (VDC).
