= Balara, Nepal =

Balara बलरा
- Municipality
- Location in Nepal
- Coordinates: 26.77°N 85.35°E
- Country: Nepal
- Development Region: Central
- Zone: Janakpur
- District: Sarlahi District
- Province: Madhesh Province
- Established: 2016 A.D. (2073 B.S.)

Government
  - Mayor: Rama Shankar Prasad Kushwaha
  - Deputy Mayor: Kosila Devi

Area
  - Total: 48.55 km^{2} (18.75 sq mi)

Population (2022)
  - Total: 47,602
  - Density: 980.5/km^{2} (2,539/sq mi)
  - Religions: Hindu

Languages
  - Local: Maithili, Hindi, NepaliBhojpuriBajika
- Time zone: UTC+5:45 (NST)
- Postal Code: 45800
- Area code: 046
- Website: www.balramun.gov.np

Balara (Maithili/Nepali: बलरा) is a municipality in Sarlahi District, a part of Madhesh Province in Nepal. It was formed in 2016 occupying current 12 sections (wards) from previous 9 former VDCs. It occupies an area of 48.55 km^{2} with a total population of 45,194. Notable people:- Dr Amresh Kumar Singh Abhay Singh Shrichan Yadav Ram Babu Das Kameshwar Sinha Nagendra Jha Kedar Nandan Chaudhary Ramashankar Kushwaha Sitaram singh Kameshwar singh

== Geography ==
Balara Municipality is composed of Balaramal (Got Balara), Bhansar Tol, Lakshmipur, Okas, Jabdi, Jamuniya, Narharganj, Arnaha, Hatiyaul, Sedhwa, Sijuwa, Mirjapur, Sudama, Chatauna, Achalgadh, Baluwabhar, Gadahiya, Dumariya, Maath Tola and Kharaiya Tola.

Balara is located about 25 kilometers south-west of Malangwa. Balara is currently the fifth largest city in Sarlahi District (after Malangawa, Barhathwa, Hariwon and Lalbandi.

The Balara village merged with the Balara Municipality on April 9, 2017.

== Demography ==
At the time of the 2009 Nepal census it had a population of 52,995 people living in 8,153 households.

Maithili is the most spoken language in the Balara Municipality, with Hindi, Nepali and English understood by the city's educated residents.

== Temples ==
Sitala Mai Temple, Bajrangbali Temple (Hanuman Asthan) Ma Durga Mandir, Malika Baba Asthan Laxmipur, Gadhi Mai Mandir, Sunar Mai Mandir, Maharani Asthan are Hindu temples there.

== Festivals ==
Major religious celebrations include the Hindu festivals Chaurchan, Deepawali and Vijayadashami, followed by Chhat pooja, celebrated six days after Deepawali . Holi, Deepawali and Chhat pooja are celebrated in a carnival-like atmosphere.
