= Atrouli =

Atrauli अत्रौली
- Location in Nepal
- Coordinates: 27°6′0″N 85°36′0″E
- Country: Nepal
- Zone: Janakpur Zone
- District: Sarlahi District

Government

Population (2001)
  - Total: 6,291
- Time zone: UTC+5:45 (Nepal Time)

Atrauli is a town and market center in Hariyon Municipality in Sarlahi District in the Janakpur Zone of south-eastern Nepal. The formerly village development committee was transformed into municipality merging the existing village development committees i.e. Atrouli, Sasapur, Dhaurkauli and Hariyon on May 18, 2014. At the time of the 1991 Nepal census it had a population of 4,888 people living in 894 individual households.

== Localities ==
- Sakhuwani
