= Musauli =

Musaili मुसैली
- Village
- Location in Nepal
- Coordinates: 26°51′27″N 85°32′16″E
- Country: Nepal
- Zone: Janakpur Zone
- District: Sarlahi District
- Rural Municipality: Kaudena Rural Municipality

Population (2011)
  - Total: 5,190
- Time zone: UTC+5:45 (Nepal Time)

Musauli or Musaili (Nepali: मुसैली, Maithili: मुसैली) is a village and former village development committee (VDC) in Sarlahi District in the Janakpur Zone of south-eastern Nepal. It is about 2 kilometres (1.2 mi) west of the district town of Malangwa and about 2 kilometres (1.2 mi) north of the border with India. At the time of the 1991 Nepal census the former VDC had a population of 4,195 individuals, and in 2011, 5190 people were reported.

== Landmarks ==
The village contains the Musauli Masjid and Baudhi Mai mosques and Shree Baudhi Devi secondary school.

== Economy ==
There is a meat factory and distillery to the west of the village, along the road to Kaudena. The provincial government has allocated 80 million rupees to maintain the pond, given that it is a tourist attraction.
