= Aurahi =

Aurahi may refer to several places in Nepal:

== Rural/arban municipality ==
- Aurahi Rural Municipality, Dhanusa, a rural municipality in Province No. 2 of Nepal
- Aurahi Rural Municipality, Siraha, a rural municipality in Province No. 2 of Nepal
- Aurahi, Mahottari, an urban municipality in Province No. 2 of Nepal

== Former Village development committee ==
- Aurahi, Saptari, a village in Saptari District
- Aurahi, Sarlahi, a village in Sarlahi District
