= Jabdi =

Jabdi may refer to:

- Jabdi, Dhawalagiri, Nepal
- Jabdi, Janakpur, Nepal
