= Khoriya =

Khoriya may refer to:

- Khoriya, Janakpur
- Khoriya, Sagarmatha
