= Parwanipur, Sarlahi =

Parwanipur परवानिपुर
- Village development committee
- Location in Nepal
- Coordinates: 27°7′0″N 85°44′30″E
- Country: Nepal
- Zone: Janakpur Zone
- District: Sarlahi District

Population (1991)
  - Total: 6,162
- Time zone: UTC+5:45 (Nepal Time)

Parwanipur is a village development committee in Sarlahi District in the Janakpur Zone of south-eastern Nepal. It is 5 km up from Mahendra Highway At the time of the 1991 Nepal census it had a population of 6162 people living in 1122 individual households.
