= Dhana Palbhawari =

Dhana Palbhawari धाना पलभावरी
- Village development committee
- Country: Nepal
- Zone: Janakpur Zone
- District: Sarlahi District

Population (1991)
  - Total: 2,338
- Time zone: UTC+5:45 (Nepal Time)

Dhana Palbhawari is a village development committee in Sarlahi District in the Janakpur Zone of south-eastern Nepal. At the time of the 1991 Nepal census it had a population of 2338 people living in 473 individual households.
