= Dhangada =

Dhangadha धन्गढा्
- Village Council
- Dhangadha
- Location in Nepal
- Coordinates: 26°54′30″N 85°28′30″E
- Province: Janakpur Zone
- District: Sarlahi District

Population (1991)
  - Total: 3,446
- Time zone: UTC+5:45 (Nepal Time)

Dhangadha is a village in the Sarlahi District in the Janakpur Zone of Nepal. As of the 1991 Nepal census, it had a population of 3,446 people living in 880 individual households.
