= Arnaha =

Arnaha may refer to:

- Arnaha, Janakpur, Nepal
- Arnaha, Sagarmatha, Nepal
