= Masaili =

Masaili मसैली
- Village development committee
- Location in Nepal
- Coordinates: 26°52′0″N 85°24′0″E
- Country: Nepal
- Zone: Janakpur Zone
- District: Sarlahi District

Population (1991)
  - Total: 3,072
- Time zone: UTC+5:45 (Nepal Time)

Masaili is a village development committee in Sarlahi District in the Janakpur Zone of southeastern Nepal. At the time of the 1991 Nepal census it had a population of 3,072 people living in 528 individual households.
