= Hathiyol =

Balara-Hathiyol बलरा-हाथियोल
- Balara Municipalcity
- Location in Nepal
- Coordinates: 26°51′0″N 85°21′0″E
- Country: Nepal
- Federal State: Province No.2
- District: Sarlahi District

Population (1991)
  - Total: 5,192
- Time zone: UTC+5:45 (Nepal Time)

Hathiyol is ward No.1&2 of Balara Municipality in Sarlahi District in the Janakpur Zone of south-eastern Nepal. At the time of the 1991 Nepal census it had a population of 5,192 people living in 917 individual households.
