= Rajghat =

Rajghat may refer to:

- Raj Ghat and associated memorials - memorial to Mahatma Gandhi in Delhi
- Rajghat, Gorakhpur (U.P.), where Ram Prasad Bismil was cremated in 1927
- Rajghat Dam
- Rajghat, Kanchanpur, Nepal
- Rajghat, Janakpur, Nepal
- Rajghat, Kosi, Nepal
- For the 1805 Anglo-Maratha treaty signed at Rajghat see Yashwantrao Holkar
