= Jamuniya =

Jamuniya may refer to:

- Jamuniya, Janakpur, Nepal
- Jamuniya, Lumbini, Nepal
