= Narayan Khola =

Narayan Khola नारायण खोला
- neighbourhood
- Nickname: तमांग हरूको बस्ती
- Location in Nepal
- Coordinates: 27°9′0″N 85°42′0″E
- Country: Nepal
- Province: Madhesh Province
- District: Sarlahi district
- Municipality: Lalbandi municipality

Population (1991)
  - Total: 3,309
- Time zone: UTC+5:45 (Nepal Time)

Narayan Khola (Nepali: नारायण खोला) is a neighborhood in Lalbandi municipality in Sarlahi district in Madhesh Province of south-eastern Nepal. It was previously a village development committee in Sarlahi in the Janakpur Zone. At the time of the 1991 Nepal census it had a population of 3,309 in 561 individual households.
