= Sasapur =

Sasapur सासपुर
- Village development committee
- Location in Nepal
- Coordinates: 27°6′0″N 85°36′0″E
- Country: Nepal
- Zone: Janakpur Zone
- District: Sarlahi District

Population (1991)
  - Total: 4,563
- Time zone: UTC+5:45 (Nepal Time)

Sasapur is a town and market center in Hariyon Municipality in Sarlahi District in the Janakpur Zone of south-eastern Nepal. The formerly village development committee was transformed into municipality merging the existing village development committees i.e. Atrouli, Sasapur, Dhaurkauli and Hariyon on May 18, 2014. At the time of the 1991 Nepal census it had a population of 4563 people living in 838 individual households.
