= Shankarpur (disambiguation) =

Shankarpur is a beach village in West Bengal, India.

Shankarpur may also refer to:

- Shankarpur (community development block), an administrative division of Madhepura district, Bihar, India
- Shankarpur, Mainpuri, a village in Karhal, Uttar Pradesh, India
- Shankarpur, Sarlahi, a village development committee in Janakpur Zone, Nepal
