= Netraganj =

Netraganj नेत्रगञ्ज
- Village development committee
- Location in Nepal
- Coordinates: 27°3′30″N 85°35′30″E
- Country: Nepal
- Municipality: Lalbandi
- District: Sarlahi District
- Zone: Janakpur Zone Until 2015
- Provinces: Madhesh Province

Population (2021)
  - Total: 11,818
- Time zone: UTC+5:45 (Nepal Time)

Netraganj (Nawalpur) is Now Lalbandi Municipality Ward 1 & 2 a (village development committee Until 2015 ) in Sarlahi District in the Madhesh Province of Central Development Region of Nepal. At the time of the 2021 Nepal census it had a population of 11,818 people living in 2,091 individual households.
