= Gadahiyabairi =

Gadahiya-Balara गड़हिया-बलरा
- Balara Municipality (Nepal)
- Nickname: Balara-Gadahiyya(बलरा-गडहिया)
- Location in Nepal
- Coordinates: 26°48′30″N 85°24′30″E
- Country: Nepal
- District: Sarlahi District

Population (1991)
  - Total: 3,964
- Time zone: UTC+5:45 (Nepal Time)

Gadahiya-Balara is Ward No.8 Of Balara Municipality in Sarlahi District in the Province No.2 of south-eastern Nepal.

At the time of the 1991 Nepal census it had a population of 3,964 people living in 747 individual households. In the census of 2002 the largest group were Maithili language speakers, 5,168 out of 5,232 inhabitants. By the time of the 2011 census the population had grown to 6,663 inhabitants.
