= Sakhuwani =

Sakhuwani सखुवनी
- village
- Location in Nepal
- Coordinates: 27°7′N 85°35′E
- Country: Nepal
- Regions of Nepal: Central Development Region, Nepal
- zones of Nepal: Janakpur Zone
- District of Nepal: Sarlahi District
- Time zone: UTC+5:45 (NPT)

Sakhuwani is a village in the Atrouli VDC of Sarlahi District in the Janakpur Zone of Nepal.
