= Hariwan =

Harion Municipality हरिवन नगरपालिका
- Municipality
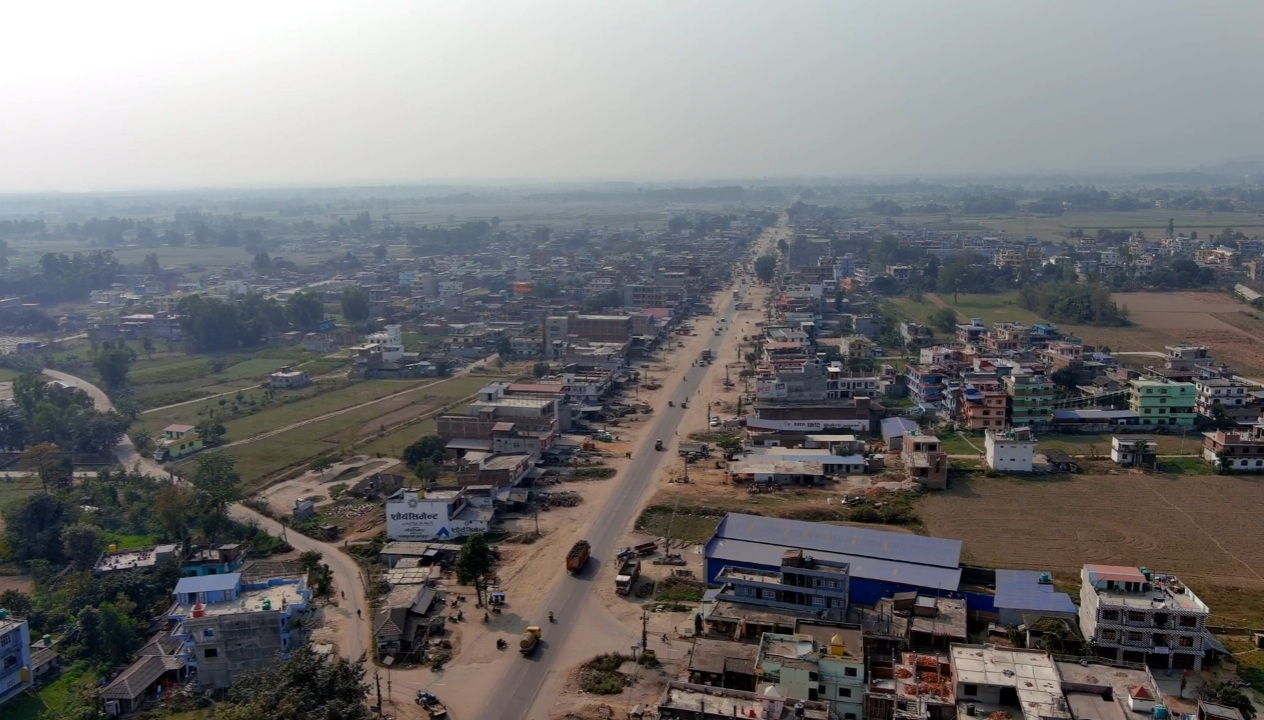
- हरिवन

- Location in Nepal
- Coordinates: 27°6′0″N 85°33′0″E
- Country: Nepal
- Zone: Janakpur Zone
- District: Sarlahi District

Government
  - Mayor: Kamal Budathoki
  - Deputy Mayor: Harimaya Ghalan

Area
  - Total: 86.12 km^{2} (33.25 sq mi)

Population (2021)
  - Total: 49,988
  - Density: 748/km^{2} (1,940/sq mi)
- Time zone: UTC+5:45 (NST)
- Postal code: 45804
- Area code: 046
- Website: harionmun.gov.np/en

Harion ( also spelled Hariwan or Hariyon) (Nepali: हरिवन) is a town and municipality in Nepal, located in Sarlahi District. The municipality is surrounded by Lalbandi municipality in the East and Bagmati municipality in the West, Hariharpurgadhi municipality of Sindhuli District, Bagmati Province falls in the North and Haripur in the South. It has been divided into 11 wards with an administration center in Harion Bazar.

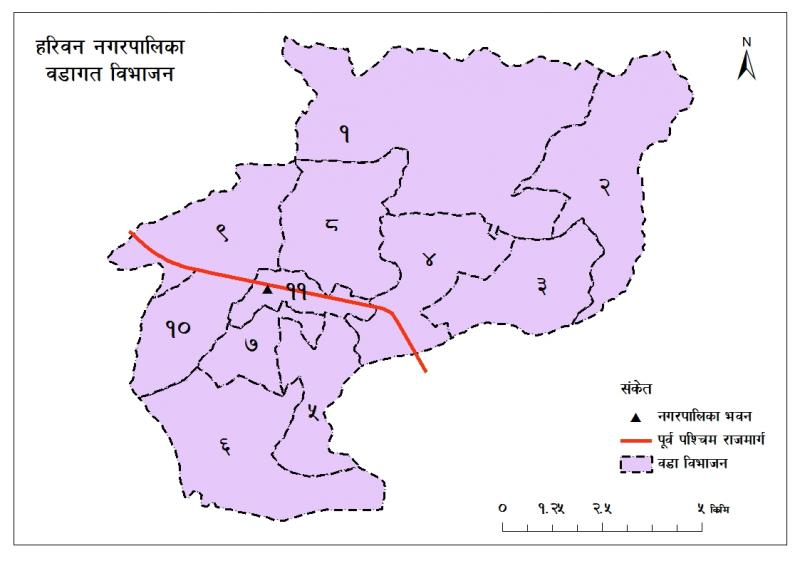
Harion Municipality

== Geography ==
Harion Municipality is broadly divided into Chure range, Bhabar and Outer Terai. The municipality is situated in subtropical monsoon climatic region so, subtropical vegetation preveals in the region. Sal Forest is dominant forest. Other trees found in the municipality are khayer, Sissou, Karma, Kumni, Harro, Barro, Sindure, Tantari, Sanisal, Simal, Bhurkul, Dabdabe, etc. The faunal species found in the region are tiger, leopard, bear, elephant, wild buffalo, wild boar, deer, chital, etc. Peacock, Hornbill, kalij, Luiche, etc. are the birds found in the region. Deforestation, population increment are major cause for destruction of habitat of wildlife. Lakhandehi River flows through this municipality.

=== Climate ===
Harion region has subtropical monsoon type of climate. With the reference to Climatic station of Janakpur, the average maximum temperature of the municipality is 31 C with record of 42 C the highest temperature while the average minimum temperature of 20 C with record of 4 C. About 80% of rainfall occurs in monsoon season (July–September) with average rainfall of 1699.6 mm.

== Education ==
The literacy rate of the municipality is 59.77% with male literacy rate of 67.91% and female literacy 52.13%. The municipality has become an educational centre of Sarlahi district. The Schools and college in the city are :

- Chaturbhujeshwar Janata Multiple Campus, Sukhepokhari.
- Chaturbhujeshwar Janata Higher Secondary School, Sukhepokhari.
- Mahadev Janata HSS, Harion.
- Sunrise HSS Boarding School, Harion.
- Mankamana Higher Secondary School, Harion.
- Gyan Jyoti Awasiya Vidhyalaya Harion.
- Dawning future Secondary School.
- Firefly Academy, Harion - 4, Tinghare.
- D.A.V Sushil Kedia Vishwa Bharati Secondary Boarding School.
- Shisu Pragya Sadan.
- Sarlahhi Ambition Academy.
- Orchid International Boarding School, Harion.
- Shree Ram Autar Janta Secondary School, [Atrouli|Atrauli].
- Shree Janta Lower secondary School, [Bramhasthan] Atrauli

== Drinking water ==
Most households use tube well/hand pump for drinking water with percent of 68.50 while 16.92% people use drinking water from uncovered well/kuwa. Only 6.88 percentage of people use tap/piped water. Some people use drinking water from river/stream as well. Sprout water, covered well/kuwa, etc. are the other source of drinking water.

== Use of energy ==
People of Harion Municipality mainly depend upon traditional fuel type for cooking. According to census 2011 AD, about 80.31% of people in Harion Municipality use firewood as cooking fuel. About 10.04% of people depend on LP gas for cooking. Biogas use is in third position for using cooking fuel which hold 6.52% household. Other cooking fuel are kerosene, electricity, santhi/Guitha and the others.

People of Harion mainly depend on electricity, kerosene lamps, biogas, solar energy for lighting purpose. About 86.06% of them use electricity for lighting while 12% of them use kerosene lamps for lighting purpose. Use of alternative energy such as biogas and solar is less than one percentage.

== Sanitation ==
Almost half of total household has a toilet while another half percentage of people are involved in open defecation. According to population and housing census 2011, about 31.74% of household has flush toilet and 17.92% of ordinary toilet. About 49.24% of household do not have toilet in the house. In 2019, current situation whole municipality is declared as open defecation free.

== Industries ==
Hariwan is one of the main business centers of the District. InduShankar Chini Udhog (Sugar Mill) Ltd. and Brijlal Chamal Udhog (Rice Mill) Ltd are two major industries that are situated in municipality.

Harion municipality is widely known for Indushankhar Chini Udyog(Mega Suger factory), which is one of the biggest industries in Nepal. Formed in the year 1984, it is the oldest and first privately owned sugar mill of Nepal which is considered as the backbone of Harion economy. The company has been providing employment for thousands of people all over the nation for over three decades. The plant produces high quality sugar and its by-product with a production capacity of 36,650 MT. Harion Industries and Commerce Organisation is also active in the municipality.

== Media ==
There is one FM radio stations in Hariwan Municipality i.e. Radio Sarlahi 105.6 MHz. Radio Sarlahi is a community radio station.

== Services ==
Harion has a permanent market area which houses shops for garment, hardware, cosmetics, department stores, DVD rentals, travel agencies, grocery store, hospital, cooperative finance companies, a couple of major banks and their ATMs. Harion has one of the most famous eye hospital. One can also use internet facilities in the market area. There is a biweekly market that is set up every Wednesday and Saturday. This are the days when most people from the surrounding areas come for the weekly shopping of groceries. With each passing day the number of shops in the market are growing along with the quality and variety of products that they offer. The forest services are provided by Harion Range post Office which works under Ilaka Forest Office, Murtiya. Health Cooperative and Communication Cooperative are two special type of cooperatives working in the VDC.

== Temples ==
There are a couple of popular temples around the region:

1. Ganesh Temple, Harion - 4, Ganesh Chowk.

2. Rajdevi Temple at Harion - 4, Tinghare.

3. Durga Temple at Nocha

4. Chaturbhujeshwar Mahadev Temple at Sukhepokhari

5. Krishna Temple at Harion Chowk

6. Mahadev Temple at Purano Bazzar

7. Shree Ram Janaki Temple in Luitel Tol..

Youth Club

- Star Youth Club Hariwan-11, Sarlahi
- Khalifa Youth club Hariwan-11, Sarlahi

== Transport ==
The most important National Highway in Nepal passes through Harion, the EastWest Highway. Due to this most long route buses plying to major hubs in the country like Kathmandu, Pokhara, Birgunj, Biratnagar, Nepalgunj pass through Harion and so one can easily catch a bus to all the major parts of the country from Harion. For local transportation, tempos and Tata ace are popularly used. Nearest airport is the Simara Airport which is approximately 60 km. One can get flights to major destination in Nepal from this airport.

== See also ==
- Lalbandi
- Ishwarpur
- Bardibas
