= Raniganj, Nepal =

Village Development Committee in Janakpur Zone, Nepal

Ranigunj रानीगञ्ज
- Village Development Committee
- Location in Nepal
- Coordinates: 27°2′30″N 85°39′0″E
- Country: Nepal
- Zone: Janakpur Zone
- District: Sarlahi District

Population (1991)
  - Total: 4,192
- Time zone: UTC+5:45 (Nepal Time)

Ranigunj is a village development committee in Sarlahi District in the Janakpur Zone of south-eastern Nepal. At the time of the 1991 Nepal census it had a population of 4,192 people living in 767 individual households.

RANIGUNJ is one of the 99 Villages Development Committee in Sarlahi District in the Janakpur Zone of south-eastern Nepal. It has a population of 6,150 people living in 1,026 individual households. Area of the Village Development Committee is 4 km* 2.5 km square kilometers and density of the Village is 348.0. This village lies between two river, Phuljor and Kalinjor.

Total population of the village has 6,150, of which 3,383 are male and 2,767 are female. Ratio of the VDC is 80% farmers, 10% business men, 5% job holder, and rest of the population is other. This located at 38 km North from Malangwa, the district headquarter of Sarlahi.

RANIGUNJ has 5 villages i.e. Danda Tol, Bhattarai Tol, Pratap Tol, Sahevagunj and Tikuliya. RANIGUNJ is nearly 0.1 km from Danda Tol and 0.5 km from Bhattarai tole, 1 km from Pratap Tol, 1 km from Shahevagunj and 3 km from Tikuliya. This village is well known for wheat, sugarcane, tomato, and paddy crop. Ranigunj does not have proper irrigation. Farmers are more depend on rain water for cultivation. It has only one deepboring for irrigation.

Neighboring Villages East –Ishworpur VDC, 3 km West – Lalbandi VDC and Jabdi VDC, 3 km North – Parwanipur VDC, 4 km South –Ishworpur VDC and Jabdi VDC 3 km

School Ranigunj VDC has 4 Government school, one community school, and 3 private school. Among them one is higher secondary, one is high school and rest is primary school.
