= Gamhariya, Sarlahi =

Gamhariya गम्हरिया
- Village Development Committee
- Nickname: Gamhariya Gardaul
- Location in Nepal
- Coordinates: 26°53′0″N 85°34′30″E
- Country: Nepal
- Province: 2
- Capital: Janakpurdham
- District: Sarlahi
- Municipality: Malangwa Municipality

Population (2011)
  - Total: 8,000
- Time zone: UTC+5:45 (Nepal Time)

Gamhariya (formerly known as Gamhariya Gardaul) is a Village Development Committee in Sarlahi District in the Janakpur Zone of south-eastern Nepal. At the time of the 2011 Nepal census it had a population of 8,000 people residing in 674 individual households. It has two sub villages small Palsi which is hardly 1 km east of the village and other is called Ganesiya which is located at south of the village which is also 1 km. North Ganesiya is associate with Gamhariya identified by ward no 6 and south part is located in Musaili VDC.

Total population of the village has 8,000 as per 2011 census where male 4,400 and female 3,600. Ratio of the VDC is 60% farmers, 20% business men and rest of the population is professional. Yearly GDP of VDC is 12% and this is one of the developed and successful VDC of Sarlahi compare to other VDCs which is located at 2 km from headquarters Malangwa, Sarlahi.

Neighboring Villages Gamhariya is neighbourhood of Malangwa Municipality which is hardly 2 km far in south. In north Salempur village development committee distance 2.5 km. Similarly in north-east Brahampuri distance 3 km and south-east Bhelhi is located with same distance. Aurahi and Sagardina have same distance 2.5 km located in west and north-west accordingly. At last Motipur is South-west which 3 km from Gamhariya.

== Temples ==
- Thakurji Temple
- Braham Maharaj Temple
- Maharani Mai Temple
- Chameli Mai Temple
- Karik Maharaj Temple
- Malangwa Baba Temple

== Malangwa - 11, Ward Chairman & Members ==
- Swambhu Yadav, Ward Chairman
- Ram Vishwas Ray, Ward Member
- Ahmed Reza Ansari, Ward Member
- Satya Devi Yadav, Female Member
- Samundri Devi, Dalit Female Member

== Malangwa - 12, Ward Chairman & Members ==
- Ramdaresh Ray, Ward Chairman
- Nawal Kishore Ray, Male member
- Jagarnath Sah Teli, Male member
- Sunayena Kumari Devi, Female member
- Member4, Dalit Female member

== Education System ==
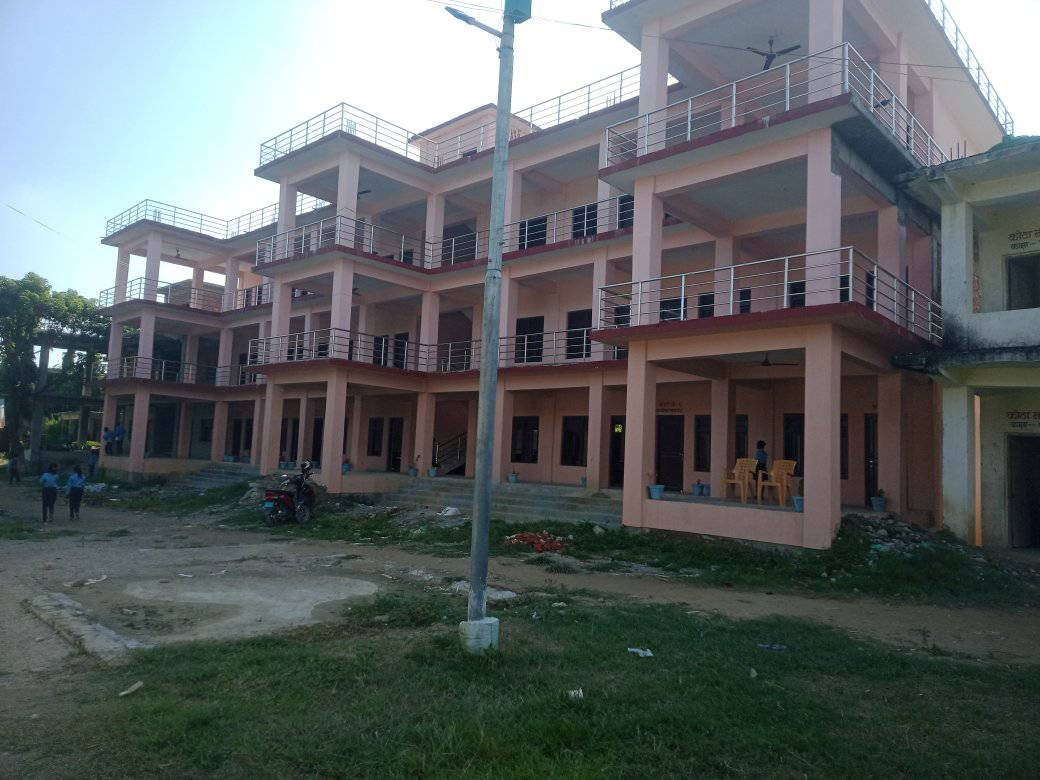
Edu Photo : Shri Mati Laxmi Devi

- Shree Mati Laxmi Devi Janta Secondary High School, Gamhariya-1
- Shree Dinesh Sahid School
- Samudayik School
- Primary School
- Ant Boarding School
- Model Boarding School
- Children's kingdom Academy, Malangwa-12

== Road ==
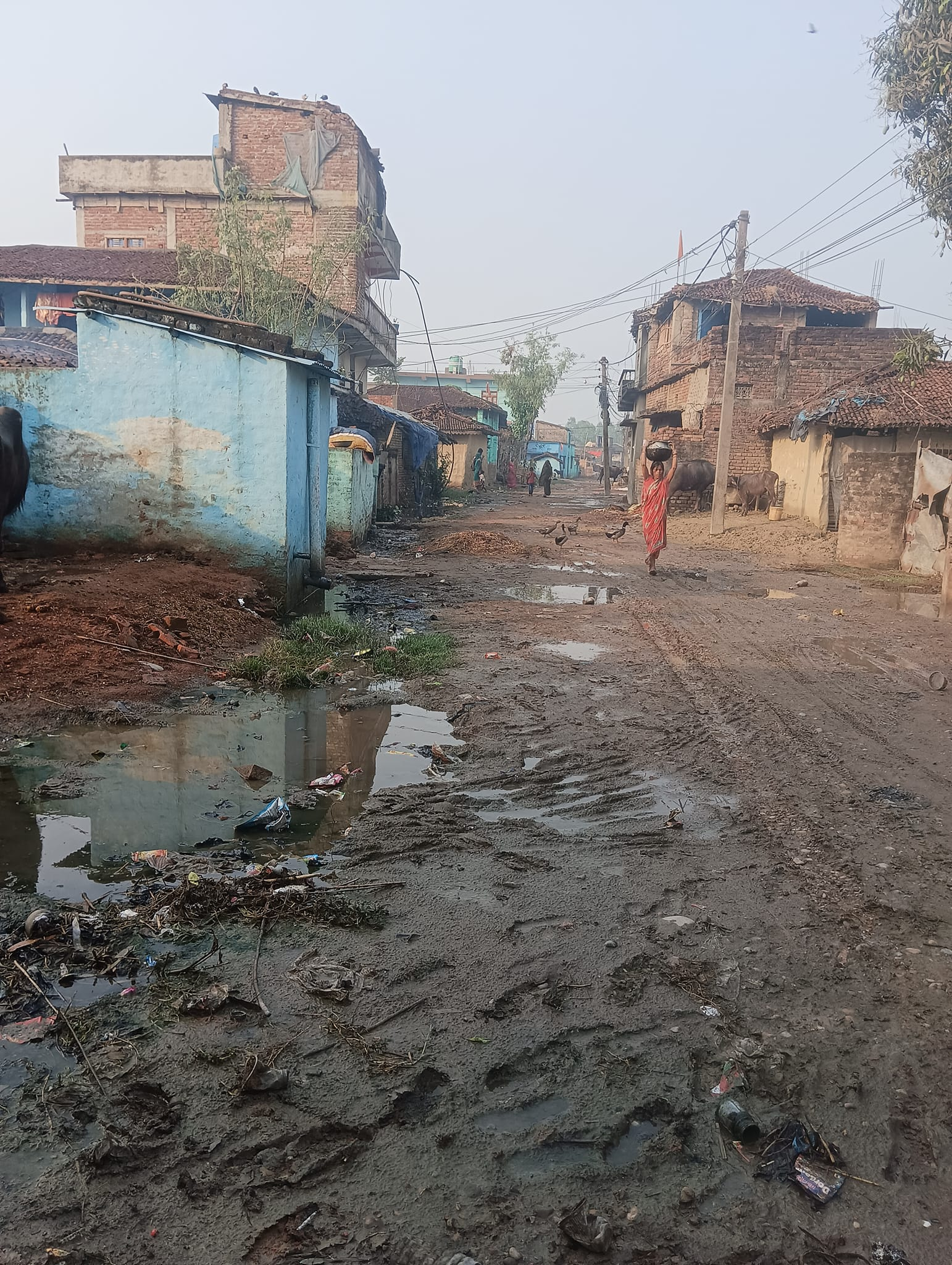
Photo : Gamhariya, (Malangwa - 12)

== Agriculture ==
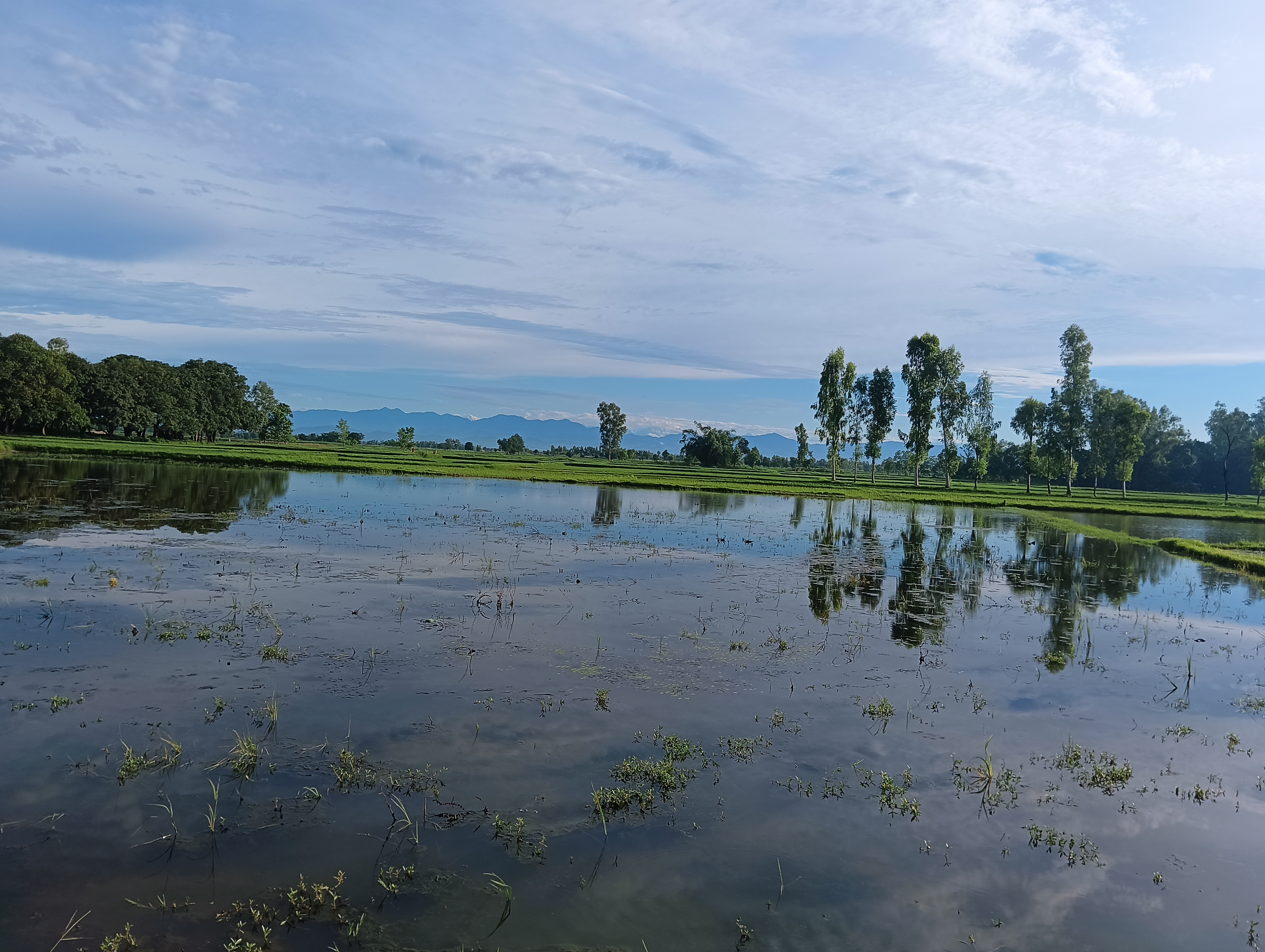
Photo : Gamhariya-9 (Malangwa - 12)

== Hospice ==
There are multiple Hospice in Gamhariya (Malangwa ward no 11 & 12).

== Local Market ==
- The local market is held twice a week, on Saturday and Wednesday.

== History ==
- Late. Basdev Ray
- Late. Deva Ray
- Late. Devsharan Ray
- Late. Hari Thakur
- Late. Jaleshwar Thakur
- Late. Jugal Ray
- Late. Laxmi Mahato
- Late. Pradip Singh
- Late. Radhe Ray
- Late. Ram Adhin Ray
- Late. Ram Bali Singh
- Late. Saryug Mahato
- Late. Sikari Ray
