= Kalinjor =

Kalinjor कालिन्जोर
- Village development committee
- Location in Nepal
- Coordinates: 27°3′0″N 85°46′0″E
- Country: Nepal
- Zone: Janakpur Zone
- District: Sarlahi District

Population (1991)
  - Total: 3,871
- Time zone: UTC+5:45 (Nepal Time)

Kalinjor is a village development committee in Sarlahi District in the Janakpur Zone of south-eastern Nepal. At the time of the 1991 Nepal census, it had a population of 3,871 people living in 666 individual households.
