= Khaiharwa =

Khairwa खैर्वा
- Village development committee
- Location in Nepal
- Coordinates: 26°48′53″N 85°22′04″E
- Country: Nepal
- Zone: Janakpur Zone
- District: Sarlahi District

Population (1991)
  - Total: 7,216
- Time zone: UTC+5:45 (Nepal Time)

Khairwa is a village development committee in Sarlahi District in the Janakpur Zone of south-eastern Nepal. At the time of the 1991 Nepal census it had a population of 7,216 people living in 1,301 individual households.
