= Sudama, Nepal =

Ward Area in Province No.2, Nepal

Sudama सुदामा
- Ward Area
- Location in Nepal
- Coordinates: 26°48′0″N 85°22′0″E
- Country: Nepal
- Balara Municipality: Province No.2
- District: Sarlahi District

Population (1991)
  - Total: 3,634
- Time zone: UTC+5:45 (Nepal Time)

'Sudama 'is the ward number ten of the Balara municipality in Sarlahi District in the province two of south-eastern Nepal. West Achalgardh East Dhurwa North Khairwar South Chhatauna. The 2001 census, it has a population of 3,634 people, of which 3619 are Hindus and 15 are Muslims.
