= Madhubani, Nepal =

Village development committee in Janakpur Zone, Nepal

Madhubani मधुबनी
- Village development committee
- Interactive map of Madhubani
- Coordinates: 26°47′0″N 85°24′0″E
- Country: Nepal
- Province: Madhesh Province
- District: Sarlahi District

Population (1991)
  - Total: 2,584
- Time zone: UTC+5:45 (Nepal Time)

Madhubani is a rural municipality in Sarlahi District in the Madhesh Province of south-eastern Nepal. At the time of the 1991 Nepal census it had a population of 2584 people living in 469 individual households.
