= Mohanpur, Sarlahi =

Mohanpur मोहनपुर
- Village Development Committee
- Location in Nepal
- Coordinates: 26°55′0″N 85°36′0″E
- Country: Nepal
- Zone: Janakpur Zone
- District: Sarlahi District

Population (1991)
  - Total: 3,572
- Time zone: UTC+5:45 (Nepal Time)

Mohanpur is a Village Development Committee in Sarlahi District in the Janakpur Zone of south-eastern Nepal. At the time of the 1991 Nepal census it had a population of 3,572 people residing in 607 individual households.
