= Achalgadh =

Place in Nepal

Achalgadh-Balara, Nepal अचलगढ-बलरा,नेपाल
- Ward
- Nickname: Balara-Achalgadh(बलरा-अचलगढ)
- Location in Nepal
- Coordinates: 26°47′0″N 85°22′30″E
- Country: Nepal
- Municipality: Balara
- District: Sarlahi District

Population (1991)
  - Total: 2,497
- Time zone: UTC+5:45 (Nepal Time)

Achalgadh is Ward No.9 of Balara Municipality in Sarlahi District in the Province No.2 of south-eastern Nepal. At the time of the 1991 Nepal census it had a population of 2,497 people living in 467 individual households.
