= Jabdi, Sarlahi =

Jabdi जब्दी
- Location in Nepal
- Coordinates: 27°2′0″N 85°37′0″E
- Country: Nepal
- Zone: Janakpur Zone
- District: Sarlahi District

Population (1991)
  - Total: 6,507
- Time zone: UTC+5:45 (Nepal Time)

Jabdi is a town in Lalbandi Municipality in Sarlahi District in the Janakpur Zone of south-eastern Nepal. At the time of the 1991 Nepal census it had a population of 6,507 people living in 1,135 individual households.
