= Narayanpur, Sarlahi =

Narayanpur नारायणपुर
- Village development committee
- Location in Nepal
- Coordinates: 26°51′30″N 85°30′30″E
- Country: Nepal
- Zone: Janakpur Zone
- District: Sarlahi District

Government
  - V.D.C. Leader: Sagar Raj Sah

Population (1991)
  - Total: 2,198
- Time zone: UTC+5:45 (Nepal Time)
- Postal code: 45803
- Area code: 046

Narayanpur is a village development committee in Sarlahi District in the Janakpur Zone of south-eastern Nepal. At the time of the 1991 Nepal census it had a population of 2,198 people living in 427 individual households.
