= Lalbandi =

Lalbandi Municipality लालबन्दी नगरपालिका
- Municipality
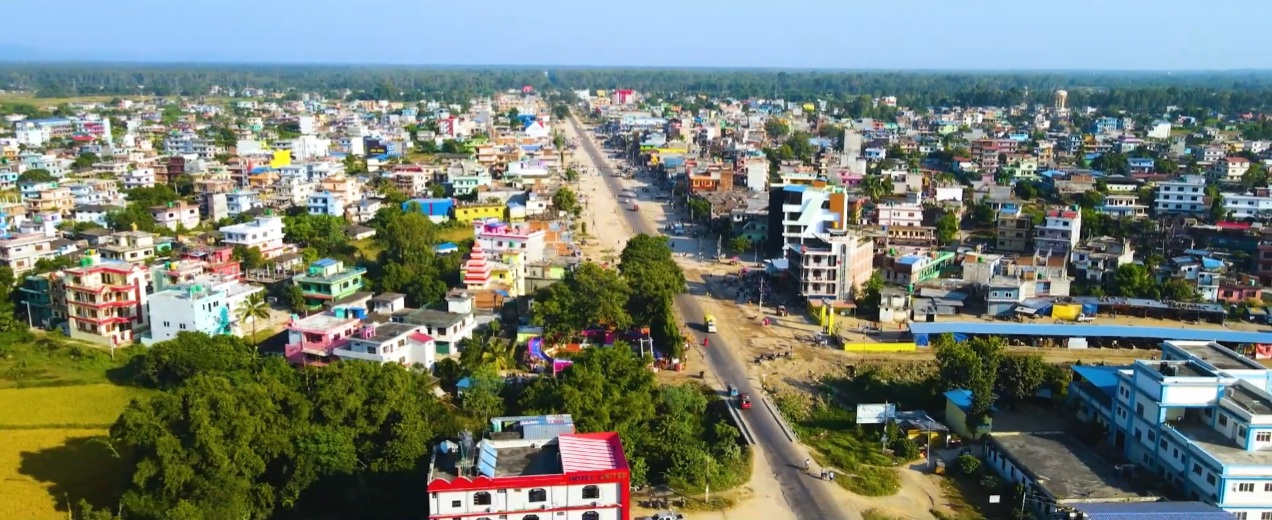
- Nickname: लालबन्दी
- Location in Nepal
- Coordinates: 27°4′14″N 85°39′12″E
- Country: Nepal
- Province: Madhesh Province
- District: Sarlahi
- Zone: Janakpur (until 2015)
- Development Region: Central Development Region (until 2015)
- Established: 18th May, 2014
- Incorporated (VDC): Netragunj, Lalbandi, Narayankhola, Parwanipur & Ranigunj

Government
  - Mayor: Basudev Adhikari (Congress)
  - Deputy Mayor: Kalpana Maya Pakhrin (Congress)

Area
  - Total: 238.50 km^{2} (92.09 sq mi)

Population (2021)
  - Total: 66,419
  - Density: 278.49/km^{2} (721.28/sq mi)
- Time zone: UTC+05:45 (NPT)
- Postal code: 45801
- Area code: 046
- Website: lalbandimun.gov.np

Lalbandi (Nepali: लालबन्दी) is a municipality in the Sarlahi district of Madhesh Province, Nepal. It is the largest municipality in Madhesh Province, with its administrative office located in Ward No. 6.

Lalbandi Bazar, situated along the East-West Highway, (also known as the Mahendra Highway), is a significant trading hub within the municipality. Lalbandi shares its borders with Ishwarpur Municipality to the east and south, Haripur Municipality to the west and south, Sindhuli district to the north, and Hariwan to the west. It serves as the primary trading center for the district.

Due to increasing urbanization and growing business activities, this municipality is emerging as a center of attraction in the district and is developing into the largest municipality in the region.

The municipality is collectively striving for prosperity and development under its original slogan: "Clean, beautiful and prosperous city, Pride of Sarlahi District." It is committed to the economic and social upliftment of women, indigenous nationalities, Dalits, and individuals with disabilities within its jurisdiction.

The area is known for tomato production in Nepal. Tomatoes, along with other green vegetables, are important cash crops, along with paddy, wheat, maize and other crops. It is a developing municipality in the Mid Terai region of Nepal. Bhudeo Khadya Udhyog (Hulas Foods), a subsidiary of Hulas Group, is located here and is one of the larger rice, pulse, and flour manufacturing and packaging industries in Nepal.

== Geography ==
Lalbandi Municipality is broadly divided into the Chure range, Bhabar, and Outer Terai. The municipality is located in a subtropical monsoon climate, resulting in subtropical vegetation in the region. The dominant forest type is Sal Forest (Shorea robusta). Other tree species found in the municipality include Khayer, Sissou (Dalbergia sissoo), Karma, Kumni, Harro, Barro, Sindure, Tantari, Sanisal, Simal (Bombax ceiba), Bhurkul, and Dabdabe.

The fauna of the region includes species such as tigers, leopards, bears, elephants, wild buffalo (Bubalus arnee), wild boars, deers, and chital. Bird species found in the area include peacocks, hornbills, kalij, and Luiche, among others. Deforestation and population growth are major factors contributing to the destruction of wildlife habitats. The Lakhandehi River flows through the municipality.

== Climate ==
The Harion region has a subtropical monsoon climate. According to the Climatic Station of Janakpur, the average maximum temperature in the municipality is 31 °C, with a recorded highest temperature of 42 °C. The average minimum temperature is 20 °C, with a recorded lowest temperature of 4 °C. Approximately 80% of the region's rainfall occurs during the monsoon season (July–September), with an average annual rainfall of 1,699.6 mm.

== Education ==
The municipality is home to Janajyoti Multiple Campus, a community school offering education up to the postgraduate level, as well as a 3-year Diploma in Computer Science through the CTEVT. Additionally, Janjyoti Technical School provides an 18-month sub-overseas course. There are a total of 40 community schools in the municipality.

== Source of Drinking water ==
Most households use tube wells or hand pumps for drinking water, while people in the northern part of the municipality rely on uncovered wells (kuwa). In some areas, residents use tap or piped water, and some also drink water from rivers or streams. Other sources of drinking water include sprout water and covered wells (kuwa). The municipality has been making significant progress in ensuring a reliable supply of potable water to its residents.

== Use of Energy ==
The people of Lalbandi Municipality primarily depend on traditional fuel types for cooking, with a small percentage using LP gas. Biogas is also used as a cooking fuel. Other cooking fuels include kerosene, electricity, santhi/Guitha, and others. For lighting, the residents mainly rely on electricity, kerosene, biogas, and solar energy.

== Industries/Agriculture ==
Lalbandi supplies the entire country's demand for tomatoes. The largest Tropical Horticulture Center in Nepal, also known as the Tropical Horticulture Center, is located in Lalbandi Municipality. The center is renowned for the production of mangoes, litchis, scientifically cultivated tomatoes, and a wide variety of flower species.

The area is known for tomato production in Nepal. Tomatoes, along with other green vegetables, are the main cash crops, alongside paddy, wheat, maize, and other crops. It is one of the fastest-developing municipalities in the Mid Terai region of Nepal. Bhudeo Khadya Udhyog (Hulas Foods), a subsidiary of Hulas Group, is located here and is one of the largest rice, pulse, and flour manufacturing and packaging industries in Nepal.

== Service ==
Lalbandi has a permanent market area with shops selling garments, hardware, cosmetics, groceries, DVDs, and other items. The market also includes travel agencies, a hospital, cooperative finance companies, and a few major banks with ATMs. Internet facilities are available in the market. A biweekly market is held every Monday and Thursday, when many people from surrounding areas come for their grocery shopping. The number of shops and the variety of products available in the market continue to grow.

== Media ==
There are two FM radio stations in Lalbandi Municipality: Radio Ekata 92.4 MHz and Dhukdhuki FM 95.2 MHz. Radio Ekata is a community radio station, while Dhukdhuki FM is a private radio station. Some of the local news portals include Ujyaalo Abhiyan and Chiyocharcho Khabar.

== Health ==
In terms of healthcare, Lalbandi Municipality has a 15-bed government hospital, a 100-bed community cooperative hospital, and a community eye treatment center under construction. Various associations also operate healthcare services in the municipality. The Primary Health Center has been upgraded to Lalbandi City Hospital.

== Transportation ==
The East-West Highway, the most important national highway in Nepal, passes through Lalbandi. As a result, most long-route buses traveling to major destinations such as Kathmandu, Pokhara, Birgunj, Biratnagar, and Nepalgunj pass through Lalbandi, making it easy to catch a bus to various parts of the country. Bardibas, where the BP Highway begins, is located 26 km east of Lalbandi. For local transportation, tuk-tuks, safari vehicles, tempos, and Tata Ace vehicles are commonly used. The nearest airport is Simara Airport, approximately 70 km away, offering flights to major destinations within Nepal.

== See also ==
- Hariwan
- Bardibas
