= Belwajabdi =

Village development committee in Janakpur Zone, Nepal

Bhatauliya भटौलिया
- Village development committee
- Nickname: Bhatauliya- sarlahi
- Location in Nepal
- Country: Nepal
- Zone: Janakpur Zone
- District: Sarlahi District

Population (1991)
  - Total: 6,500
- Time zone: UTC+5:45 (Nepal Time)

Bhatauliya is a village development committee in Sarlahi District in the Janakpur Zone of south-eastern Nepal. At the time of the 1991 Nepal census it had a population of 3,350 people living in 655 individual households.
