= Tribhuwannagar, Sarlahi =

Tribhuwannagar त्रिभुवननगर
- Village development committee
- Location in Nepal
- Coordinates: 26°51′30″N 85°36′15″E
- Country: Nepal
- Zone: Janakpur Zone
- District: Sarlahi District

Population (1991)
  - Total: 2,515
- Time zone: UTC+5:45 (Nepal Time)

Tribhuwannagar is a village development committee in Sarlahi District in the Janakpur Zone of south-eastern Nepal. At the time of the 1991 Nepal census it had a population of 2,515 people living in 391 individual households.

It is located on the eastern outskirts of Malangawa.
