= Sisaut =

Sisaut सिसौट Raj Guru Sisout
- Rural Municipalities
- Location in Nepal
- Coordinates: 26°50′0″N 85°23′30″E
- Country: Nepal
- Province: Madhesh Province
- District: Sarlahi District

Government
  - Rural municiaplity's Chairman: Raja Babu Yadav

Population (2011)
  - Total: 7,967
- Time zone: UTCGMT +5:45 (Nepal Time)

Sisaut is a Rural Municipalities in Sarlahi District in the Madhesh Province of south-eastern Nepal. At the time of the 2011 Nepal census, it had a population of 7,967 people living in 1,283 individual households. It is about 34km away from Mahendra Highway. It lies 208 km (130 mi) south east of the capital Kathmandu. Durga-puja during the Dashain festival is very famous here, many devotees from various villages come to here in the evening.[Sandhya Aarti]. It lies around 18 kilometers west of the district headquarters Malangwa. People form here are kind hearted and self-motivated (no evidence provided). It has a high literate rate as compare to other districts of Madhesh Province (no evidence provided). The number of civil service workers is high. Foreign employment is now a big source of household. Most people work in India.

Developmental works are being done by the representatives of here like MP, Mayor and Wada Chairman. The Present MP of this region[Sarlahi Area no.4] is Dr. Amresh Kumar Singh. The Present Mayor of this Region[Ramnagar rural municipality] is Raja Babu Yadav.[Youngest Mayor of Nepal]. 

Religious sites include: Mahadev Temple, Ram Janki Temple, Mahavir Temple, Baudhi Mata Temple, and the Baraham Baba Temple.

The bridge located on Manushmara river (sisaut) with about 100 meter length & one swing bridge {Jhulunge पुल}

A big Haat Bazaar takes place on Sundays and Thursdays.

Most people are employed in farming. There are also Businessman, government job holders, and Pandits.

There are two governmental and 3-4 private boarding schools.

Bhojpuri, Bajika, Maithili, Nepali and Hindi are the languages spoken in the village
