= Basantapur, Sarlahi =

Basantapur बसन्तपुर
- Former Village Development Committee
- Location in Nepal
- Coordinates: 26°56′0″N 85°42′0″E
- Country: Nepal
- Province: Madhesh Province
- District: Sarlahi District
- Part of: Haripurwa Municipality

Population (2022)
  - Total: 14,283
- Time zone: UTC+5:45 (Nepal Time)
- Postal code: 45800
- Area code: .06

Basantapur (Nepali: बसन्तपुर) is a village in Haripurwa Municipality of Sarlahi District in Madhesh Province, Nepal. It is bordered by Fulkaha on the east, Sokanaha on the west, Shrinagar on the north and Haripurwa on the south. Which has a total area of 436/km. And which has a total population of about 14283. And there are several neighborhoods including Bagiyaba, Toka, Mirchaya, Baharwa, and Harsaha Local languages include Bajika, Maithili, Nepali and Urdu .The occupation of the people there is farming.
