= Pattharkot =

Pattharkot पत्थरकोट
- Location in Nepal
- Coordinates: 27°6′0″N 85°39′0″E
- Country: Nepal
- Zone: Janakpur Zone
- District: Sarlahi District

Population (1991)
  - Total: 4,825
- Time zone: UTC+5:45 (Nepal Time)

Pattharkot is a town in Lalbandi Municipality in Sarlahi District in the Janakpur Zone of south-eastern Nepal. At the time of the 1991 Nepal census it had a population of 4,825 people living in 825 individual households.
