= Haripurwa =

Haripurwa Municipality हरिपुर्वा नगरपालिका
- Municipality
- Location in Nepal
- Coordinates: 26°53′57″N 85°40′53″E
- Country: Nepal
- Province: Madhesh Province
- District: Sarlahi District

Government
  - Type: Local Government
  - Mayor: Binod Sah

Area
  - Total: 30.5 km^{2} (11.8 sq mi)

Population (2021/2078 BS.)
  - Total: 38,714
  - Density: 1,270/km^{2} (3,290/sq mi)
- Time zone: UTC+5:45 (Nepal Time)
- Postal code: 45803
- Area code: 046
- Website: http://www.haripurwamun.gov.np

Haripurwa is a municipality in Sarlahi District in the Madhesh Province of south-eastern Nepal. At the time of the 2021 Nepal census it had a population of 38,714 people living in 7,140 individual households. It was created by merging former Village development committees (VDCs) such as Basantapur, Haripurba, Dhankaul, Dumariya, Mirchaiya and Bagewa.
