= Harakthawa =

Harakthawa हराकठवा
- Village development committee
- Location in Nepal
- Coordinates: 26°54′0″N 85°24′0″E
- Country: Nepal
- Zone: Janakpur Zone
- District: Sarlahi District

Population (1991)
  - Total: 3,579
- Time zone: UTC+5:45 (Nepal Time)

Harakthawa is a village development committee in Sarlahi District in the Janakpur Zone of south-eastern Nepal. At the time of the 1991 Nepal census it had a population of 3,579 people living in 642 individual households.
