= Simara, Sarlahi =

Simara
- Village development committee
- Location in Nepal
- Coordinates: 26°50′0″N 85°30′30″E
- Country: Nepal
- Zone: Janakpur Zone
- District: Sarlahi District

Area
  - Total: 10.8 km^{2} (4.2 sq mi)

Population (2011)
  - Total: 8,925
  - Density: 826/km^{2} (2,140/sq mi)
- Time zone: UTC+5:45 (Nepal Time)

Simara (Nepali: सिमरा) was a village development committee in Sarlahi District in the Janakpur Zone of south-eastern Nepal. It constitutes 4 villages including Simara, Simara tola, Phenhara and Pakadi.

== Population ==
The total population of the Simara VDC in Sarlahi district is 5,971 and total individual household is 1,051 but according to National Population and Housing Census 2011, total individual household is 1,365, the total population of simara VDC of sarlahi district is 8,925, where total male population is 4,694 and total female population is 4,231.

== Neighboring Villages ==
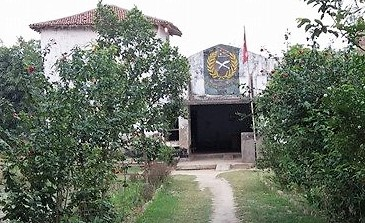
Police post simara

1. East - Bhadsar vdc
2. West - Madhubangoth vdc
3. North - Sakraul vdc
4. South - Mudaha dih village of Sitamarhi district of Bihar India.

== River ==
The Lakhandei river passes from the east side of this VDC into India.

== Institution ==
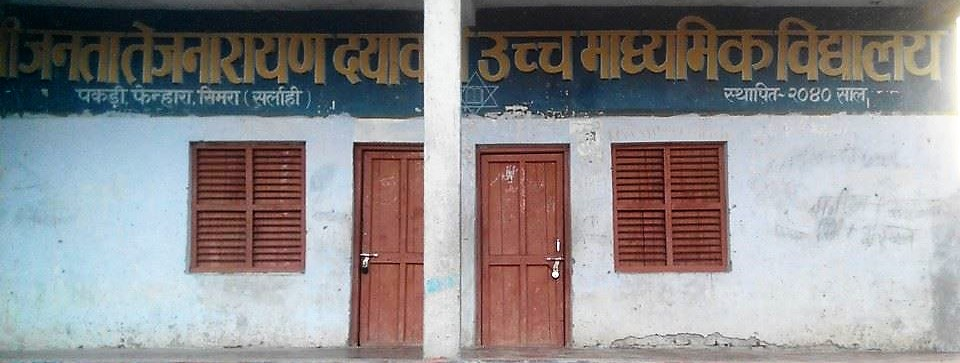
Shree JTD MA VI PAKADI

Pakadi village of Simara VDC has one higher secondary school affiliated to Higher Secondary Education Board named Shree Janata Tejnarayan Dayawati Higher Secondary School.
