= Jingadawa =

Jingadawa जिंगडवा
- Village development committee
- Location in Nepal
- Coordinates: 26°53′0″N 85°39′30″E
- Country: Nepal
- Zone: Janakpur Zone
- District: Sarlahi District

Population (1991)
  - Total: 2,769
- Time zone: UTC+5:45 (Nepal Time)

Jingadawa is a village development committee in Sarlahi District in the Janakpur Zone of south-eastern Nepal. At the time of the 1991 Nepal census it had a population of 2,769 people living in 480 individual households.
