= Sangrampur, Sarlahi =

Sangrampur, Sarlahi संग्रामपुर chhaughat Sangrampur
- Village Development Committee
- Location in Nepal
- Coordinates: 26°51′30″N 85°40′0″E
- Country: Nepal
- Zone: Janakpur Zone
- District: Sarlahi District

Government
  - Type: local
  - wardchairperson: Rakesh Ram

Population (2011)
  - Total: 15,302
- Time zone: UTC+5:45 (Nepal Time)

Sangrampur is a Village Development Committee in Sarlahi District in the Janakpur Zone of south-eastern Nepal. Now, It is a part of Parsa Rural Municipality. It is the 2nd ward of this Rural Municipality. At the time of the 1991 Nepal census it had a population of 4,491 people residing in 769 individual households.

It has a Public School named as Shree Nepal Rashtriya Baiju Janta Secondary School located in the middle of the village and chowk.
