= Kisanpur =

Village development committee in Janakpur Zone, Nepal

Kisanpur किसनपुर
- Village development committee
- Location in Nepal
- Coordinates: 26°56′0″N 85°35′0″E
- Country: Nepal
- Zone: Janakpur Zone
- District: Sarlahi District

Population (1991)
  - Total: 3,200
- Time zone: UTC+5:45 (Nepal Time)

Kisanpur is a village development committee in Sarlahi District in the Janakpur Zone of south-eastern Nepal. At the time of the 1991 Nepal census it had a population of 3,200 people living in 596 individual households.
