= Karmaihiya =

Karmaihiya कर्महिया
- Village development committee
- Location in Nepal
- Coordinates: 27°6′0″N 85°29′0″E
- Country: Nepal
- Zone: Janakpur Zone
- District: Sarlahi District

Population (1991)
  - Total: 5,552
- Time zone: UTC+5:45 (Nepal Time)

Karmaihiya is a village development committee in Sarlahi District in the Janakpur Zone of south-eastern Nepal. At the time of the 1991 Nepal census it had a population of 5,552 people living in 1,040 individual households.

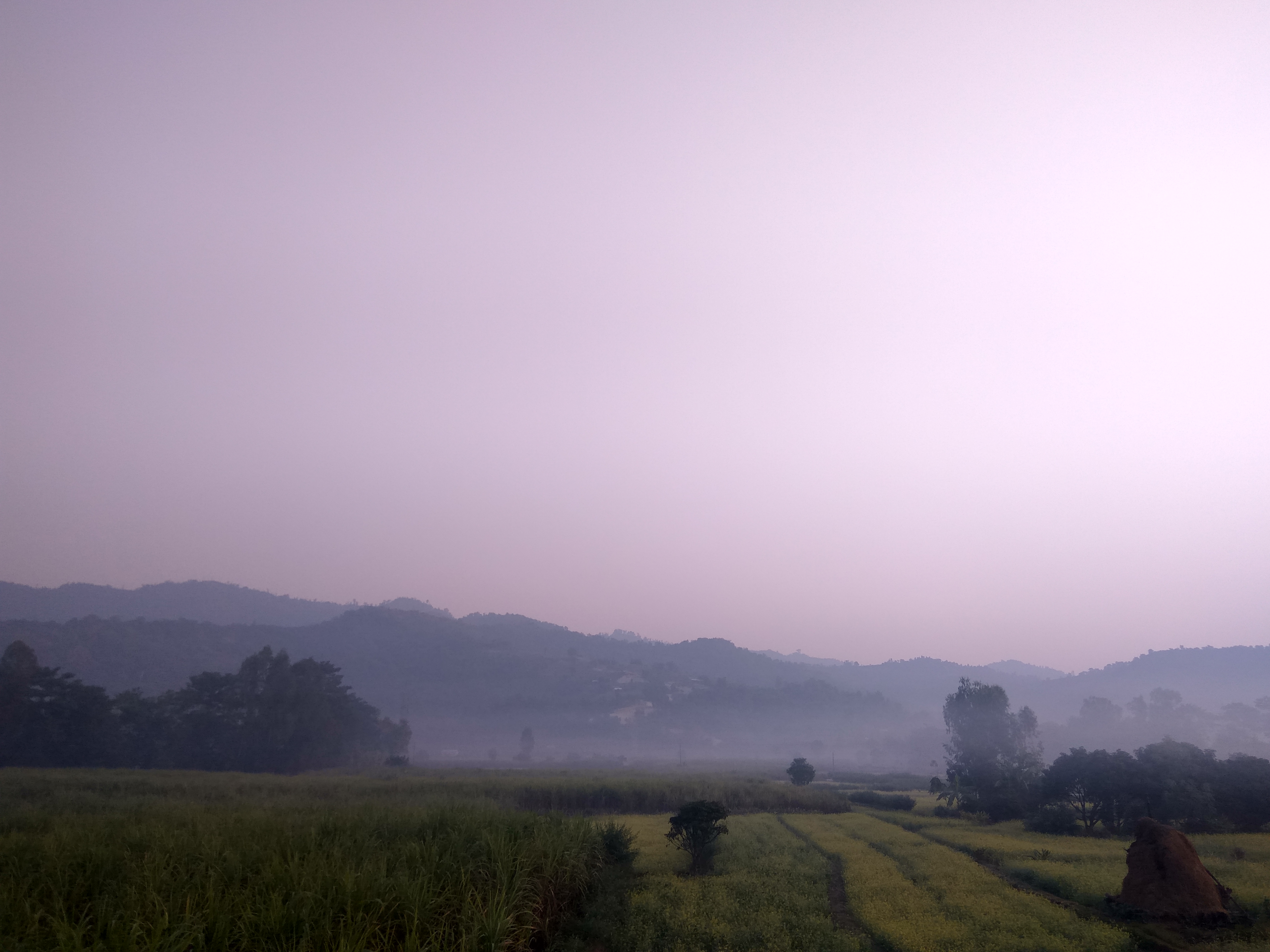
Winter morning in Karmaihiya
