= Bhagawatipur, Sarlahi =

Bhagawatipur भगवतीपुर
- Village development committee
- Location in Nepal
- Coordinates: 26°47′30″N 85°27′0″E
- Country: Nepal
- Zone: Janakpur Zone
- District: Sarlahi District

Population (1991)
  - Total: 2,702
- Time zone: UTC+5:45 (Nepal Time)

Bhagawatipur is a village development committee in Sarlahi District in the Janakpur Zone of south-eastern Nepal. At the time of the 1991 Nepal census it had a population of 2,702 people living in 553 individual households.
