= Bahadurpur, Sarlahi =

Bahadurpur बहादुरपुर
- Village Development Committee
- Location in Nepal
- Coordinates: 26°47′0″N 85°24′30″E
- Country: Nepal
- Zone: Janakpur Zone
- District: Sarlahi District

Population (1991)
  - Total: 1,129
- Time zone: UTC+5:45 (Nepal Time)

Bahadurpur is a Village Development Committee in Sarlahi District in the Janakpur Zone of south-eastern Nepal. At the time of the 1991 Nepal census it had a population of 1,129 people residing in 202 individual households.
