= Belhi, Sarlahi =

Village development committee in Sarlahi district, Nepal

Bhelhi भेलही
- Village development committee
- Bhelhi
- Location in Nepal
- Coordinates: 26°54′0″N 85°29′30″E
- Country: Nepal
- Province: Madhesh Province
- Zone: Janakpur Zone
- District: Sarlahi District

Government
  - Ward chairperson: Gautam Kumar Yadav

Population (1991)
  - Total: 2,484
- Time zone: UTC+5:45 (Nepal Time)

Bhelhi (Devanagari: भेलही), currently a part (ward 3) of Brahmapuri Rural Municipality, was a village development committee in Sarlahi District in the Janakpur Zone of south-eastern Nepal. At the time of the 1991 Nepal census it had a population of 2,484 people living in 437 individual households. It is separated from Malangwa, the headquarter of Sarlahi, by the Jhim river and is close to the India border.
