= Salempur, Nepal =

Salempur सलेमपुर
- Village development committee
- Location in Nepal
- Coordinates: 26°53′30″N 85°34′0″E
- Country: Nepal
- Zone: Janakpur Zone
- District: Sarlahi District

Population (1991)
  - Total: 5,252
- Time zone: UTC+5:45 (Nepal Time)

Salempur is a village development committee in Sarlahi District of Province No.2 in the Janakpur Zone of south-eastern Nepal. At the time of the 1991 Nepal census, it had a population of 5,252 people living in 876 individual households..There have more than 110 Houses of Muslim communities.Two Madarsa, First Madrasa Azhari in Ward No. 09 and second Madarsa Ghausia Madinatul Ilm in ward no 10.

== Notable People ==
Noor Muhammad Ansari Neta Bigu Mansuri Alimuddin Ansari Soman Mistiri
