= Jamuniya, Sarlahi =

Jamuniya जमुनिया
- Village development committee
- Location in Nepal
- Coordinates: 26°55′0″N 85°31′0″E
- Country: Nepal
- Zone: Janakpur Zone
- District: Sarlahi District

Population (1991)
  - Total: 5,399
- Time zone: UTC+5:45 (Nepal Time)

Jamuniya is a village development committee in Sarlahi District in the Janakpur Zone of south-eastern Nepal. At the time of the 1991 Nepal census it had a population of 5,399 people living in 914 individual households.

Though there is no any documented evidence, but as per the villagers, the village was settled around 18th century by group of Gwalas (Yadav) migrated from Bansghatgonra ( a village, whchich has become a part of today's Patna). The group was led by Chhitnu Ray Yadav, who became the first landlord of the village. The village was settled by clearing the Jungle area predominant with the trees of Jamun, hence named Jamuniya.

The last Landlord of Jamuniya was Nandipat Ray. Late Mr. Ramdhyaan Ray (ex-minister of state HMG-Nepal) is the most famous personality in Sarlahi District. Though the majority of the population in the VDC is poor and farmers like in other villages of Nepal, it has also produced some eminent personalities like:

- Late Mr. Sanjay Yadav ( Martyr- Madheshi Pepoples' Movement)
- Prof.Dr. Ramswarth Ray (ex-campus chief RRM Campus Janakpur)
- Prof. Krishna Deo Yadav (ex-campus chief Sarlahi Campus Malangwa) * Mr Tarun Yadav (social worker),Mr Sahil ranjan yadav(social worker), social actievist and political analyser)
- Honourable Khobhari Ray (minister of state Nepal)
- Mr. Ajay kumar sah(Social worker) *Ram Deo Ray (ex Mukhiya & social worker)

Gadhi Mai Temple, Deval Baba Temple and Madanpur Math are some important landmark of Sarlahi district, which are located in Jamuniya VDC.
