= Jabdi, Baglung =

Jabdi जब्दी
- Village Development Committee
- Country: Nepal
- Zone: Dhawalagiri Zone
- District: Baglung District

Population (1991)
  - Total: 4,565
  - Religions: Hindu
- Time zone: UTC+5:45 (Nepal Time)

Jabdi is a Village Development Committee in Baglung District in the Dhawalagiri Zone of central Nepal. At the time of the 1991 Nepal census it had a population of 4,565 and had 938 houses in the town.
