= Pidari, Nepal =

Village development committee in Janakpur Zone, Nepal

Pidari पिडारी
- Village development committee
- Location in Nepal
- Coordinates: 27°0′0″N 85°33′0″E
- Country: Nepal
- Zone: Janakpur Zone
- District: Sarlahi District

Population (1991)
  - Total: 1,337
- Time zone: UTC+5:45 (Nepal Time)

Pidari is a village development committee in Sarlahi District in the Janakpur Zone of south-eastern Nepal. At the time of the 1991 Nepal census it had a population of 3,106 people living in 545 individual households.
