= Murtiya =

Murtiya मुर्तिया
- Village development committee
- Location in Nepal
- Coordinates: 27°0′0″N 85°29′0″E
- Country: Nepal
- Zone: Janakpur Zone
- District: Sarlahi District

Population (1991)
  - Total: 6,485
- Time zone: UTC+5:45 (Nepal Time)

Murtiya is a village development committee in Sarlahi District in the Madhesh Province of south-eastern Nepal. At the time of the 1991 Nepal census it had a population of 6,485 people living in 1,120 individual households.

== Famous for ==
Murtiya is a Historical place due to the Mukteshwor Temple and also known as a Sport City. Important Place:  Mukteshwor Temple  Mukteshwor Pokhari  Bihani Ban, Picnic Sport  Malhaniya Pokhari  Foot Ball Ground  Covered Hall

Famous Person:  Ram Bahadur Khadka (Politician)  Yugesh Baral (Semantic SEO Expert)  Rabi Guragain (Businessman)
