= Rajghat, Sarlahi =

Rajghat राजघाट
- Village Development Committee
- Location in Nepal
- Coordinates: 27°3′0″N 85°26′0″E
- Country: Nepal
- Zone: Janakpur Zone
- District: Sarlahi District

Population (1991)
  - Total: 7,663
- Time zone: UTC+5:45 (Nepal Time)

Rajghat is a Village Development Committee in Sarlahi District in the Janakpur Zone of south-eastern Nepal. At the time of the 1991 Nepal census it had a population of 7,663 people residing in 1,300 individual households.
