= Chandranagar Rural Municipality =

Chandranagar चन्द्रनगर
- Rural Municipality
- Location in Nepal
- Coordinates: 26.92°N 85.58°E
- Country: Nepal
- Development Region: Central
- District: Sarlahi District
- Province: Province No. 2
- Established: 2016 A.D. (2073 B.S.)

Area
  - Total: 47.50 km^{2} (18.34 sq mi)

Population (2011)
  - Total: 35,005
  - Density: 736.9/km^{2} (1,909/sq mi)
  - Religions: Hindu Muslim Christian

Languages
  - Local: Maithili, Tharu, Nepali
- Time zone: UTC+5:45 (NST)
- Postal Code: 45800
- Area code: 046
- Website: http://www.chandranagarmun.gov.np/

Chandranagar (Nepali: चन्द्रनगर ) is a rural municipality in Sarlahi District, a part of Province No. 2 in Nepal. It was formed in 2016 occupying current 7 sections (wards) from previous 7 former VDCs. It occupies an area of 47.50 km^{2} with a total population of 35,005.
