= Arnaha, Sarlahi =

Balara-Arnaha बलरा-अर्नाहा
- Municipality
- Location in Nepal
- Coordinates: 26°46′0″N 85°23′0″E
- Country: Nepal
- State: Province No.2
- District: Sarlahi District

Population (1991)
  - Total: 2,618
- Time zone: UTC+5:45 (Nepal Time)

Balara-Arnaha (Nepali: बलरा-अर्नाहा) is Ward No.5 of balara municipality in Sarlahi District in the Province no.2 of south-eastern Nepal. At the time of the 1991 Nepal census it had a population of 2,618 people residing in 447 individual households.
