= Naukailawa =

Nokailwa नोकैल्वा
- Village development committee
- Location in Nepal
- Coordinates: 26.91°N 85.64°E
- Country: Nepal
- Zone: Janakpur Zone
- District: Sarlahi District

Government

Population (1991)
  - Total: 8,358
- Time zone: UTC+5:45 (Nepal Time)

Nokailwa is a village development committee in Sarlahi District in the Janakpur Zone of south-eastern Nepal. At the time of the 1991 Nepal census it had a population of 8,358 people living in 1,452 individual households.
