= Lakshmipur Su. =

Lakshmipur Sukhchaina लक्ष्मीपु र सु.
- Village development committee
- Location in Nepal
- Coordinates: 26°52′30″N 85°29′30″E
- Country: Nepal
- Zone: Janakpur Zone
- District: Sarlahi District

Population (2011)
  - Total: 5,760
- Time zone: UTC+5:45 (Nepal Time)

Lakshmipur Sukhchaina . is a village development committee in Sarlahi District in the Janakpur Zone of south-eastern Nepal. At the time of the 1991 Nepal census it had a population of 4,806. Now according to the census of Nepal 2011 it has the population of 5,760 spread over 888 households.
