= Godaita =

Godaita गोडैटा(गोडै़ता)
- Municipality
- Godaita Municipality
- Nickname: Godaita bazzar( गोडैता बजार)
- Location in Nepal
- Coordinates: 26.85°N 85.44°E
- Country: Nepal
- Development Region: Central
- Zone: Janakpur
- District: Sarlahi District
- Province: Madhesh pradesh
- Established: 2016 A.D. (2073 B.S.)

Government
  - Mayor: Devendra Kumar
  - Deputy Mayor: Anjana Kushwaha

Area
  - Total: 48.62 km^{2} (18.77 sq mi)

Population (2011)
  - Total: 42,315
  - Density: 870.3/km^{2} (2,254/sq mi)
  - Religions: Hindu Muslim Christian

Languages
  - Local: Bajjika, Maithili, Nepali
- Time zone: UTC+5:45 (NST)
- Postal Code: 45800
- Area code: 046
- Website: www.godaitamun.gov.np

Godaita (Nepali: गोडैटा) is a municipality in Sarlahi District, a part of Province No. 2 in Nepal. It was formed in 2016 occupying current 12 sections (wards) from previous 12 former VDCs. It occupies an area of 48.62 km^{2} with a total population of 42,315.

The previous Village Development councils (V. D. C.) which are included to form this municipality are Godaita, Sisautiya, Bahadurpur, Belwa Jabdi, Bhagwatipur, Rohuwa, Ramban, and Bagdah. Amongst them Godaita is central point of this municipality. The office of municipal council is located in Godaita. Godaita market( गोड़ैता बजार) is one of the marketing hubs in the Sarlahi district from ancient times.

Devendra Kumar, Anjana Kushwaha, Upendra Kushwaha, Krishna Kumar Kushwaha, Anita Devi, etc. are local popular persons at Godaita Municipality.
