= Parsa Rural Municipality =

Rural Municipality in Sarlahi district, Nepal

Parsa Rural Municipality पर्सा गाउँपालिका
- Rural Municipality
- Location in Nepal
- Coordinates: 26.88°N 85.61°E
- Country: Nepal
- Province: Madhesh Province
- District: Sarlahi District
- Established: 2016 A.D. (2073 B.S.)

Area
  - Total: 23.12 km^{2} (8.93 sq mi)

Population (2011)
  - Total: 21,650
  - Density: 936.4/km^{2} (2,425/sq mi)
  - Religions: Hindu Muslim

Languages
  - Local: Bajjika, Maithili, Nepali
- Time zone: UTC+5:45 (NST)
- Postal Code: 45800
- Area code: 046
- Website: http://www.parsamun.gov.np/

Parsa (Nepali: पर्सा) is a rural municipality in Sarlahi District, a part of Madhesh Province in Nepal. It is situated 10 km East from Malangwa which is headquarter of Sarlahi district. It was formed in 2016 occupying current 6 sections (wards) from previous 6 former VDCs. It occupies an area of 23.12 km^{2} with a total population of 21,650. The major language spoken in the rural municipality are Maithili and Bajjika.

== Schools ==
In Parsa municipality, there are five government schools. Among them two are secondary schools:
1. Shree Public Secondary School is in the northern part of the village. This school is up to 12th grade. Students from nearby villages also attend this school.

2. Shree Nepal Rastriya Baiju Janata Secondary School is in ward no.2 in Sangrampur village. This is the first school in the rural municipality which started 11&12 classes.

== Markets ==
There are two main market places. One in Sangrampur and other in Parsa village. In Sangrampur market sets on Monday and Friday while in Parsa it sets on Sunday and Thursday. There are many shops in both the markets which sets for vegetables and goods selling every week. These markets are near the Indian border so many Indian residents also come to trade goods in these markets. Some other small markets are in Jingadwa, Narayanpur, and Parsa villages.

== Boundaries ==
- East — Hardi Khola, Sonama Rural Municipality, Mahottari
- South — Sitamarhi, Bihar, India
- West — Brahmapuri Rural Municipality
- North — Haripurwa Municipality and Brahmapuri Rural Municipality
