= Ranban =

Village development committee in Janakpur Zone, Nepal

Godaita Nagarpalika-05 Ramban गोडैता नगरपालिका-०५ रामबन
- Village development committee
- Location in Nepal
- Coordinates: 26°51′30″N 85°26′0″E
- Country: Nepal
- Zone: Janakpur Zone
- District: Sarlahi District

Population (1991)
  - Total: 3,320
- Time zone: UTC+5:45 (Nepal Time)

Ramban was a village development committee in Sarlahi District in the Janakpur Zone of south-eastern Nepal. Now After federalism it became one ward of Godaita Nagatpalika. At the time of the 1991 Nepal census it had a population of 3,320 people living in 653 individual households.
