= Kaudena Rural Municipality =

Kaudena कौडेना
- Rural Municipality
- Location in Nepal
- Coordinates: 26.86°N 85.49°E
- Country: Nepal
- Development Region: Central
- District: Sarlahi District
- Province: Province No. 2
- Established: 2016 A.D. (2073 B.S.)

Area
  - Total: 25.33 km^{2} (9.78 sq mi)

Population (2011)
  - Total: 36,881
  - Density: 1,456/km^{2} (3,771/sq mi)
  - Religions: Hindu Muslim

Languages
  - Local: Bajjika, Maithili, Nepali
- Time zone: UTC+5:45 (NST)
- Postal Code: 45800
- Area code: 046
- Website: http://www.kaudenamun.gov.np/

Kaudena (Nepali: कौडेना) is a rural municipality in Sarlah i District, a part of Province No. 2 in Nepal. It was formed in 2016 occupying current 7 sections (wards) from previous 7 former VDCs. It occupies an area of 25.33 km^{2} with a total population of 36,881. The postal code of Kaudena is 45809. It is rich in Cultural diversity. All the groups, cast live peacefully here. There is the proper facility of School, Hospital, Health center, Clinic.There are two major boarding school here and one is government school. At here you will find a very good market facility for the farmers. The market for the farmers is opened on Monday and Thursday to sell their vegetables. There is a Police custody for the culprits which is located just by the side of Village market. Overall the road development is good. There are many shops for clothes, dairy, kirana, electrical.
