= Bhadsar =

Bhadsar भडसार
- Village development committee
- Location in Nepal
- Coordinates: 26°48′0″N 85°31′0″E
- Country: Nepal
- Zone: Janakpur Zone
- District: Sarlahi District

Population (1991)
  - Total: 2,950
- Time zone: UTC+5:45 (Nepal Time)

Bhadsar is a village development committee in Sarlahi District in the Janakpur Zone of south-eastern Nepal. At the time of the 1991 Nepal census it had a population of 2,950 people living in 499 individual households.

== History ==
This is an old village about 250 years old at a times of 19 century . There is an old temple of shiv as now (called Bangla) and also a kabristan (cemetery), the place of Muslim funerals.

== Notable people From Bhadsar ==
- Salma Khatoon Mikrani
