= Khoriya, Solukhumbu =

Khoriya खोरिया
- Village
- Country: Nepal
- Province: Province No. 1
- District: Solukhumbu District
- Time zone: UTC+5:45 (Nepal Time)

Khoriya (खोरिया) is a village in the Solukhumbu District of Nepal. It lies to the northeast of Kathmandu, in between Jiri and Lukla. It is a home of the Sherpa people. There is a primary school, a health post and two Gompa (monasteries) in the center of the village: Samten Chholing Gompa (Rato gompa) and Seto Gompa. Both monasteries are Nyingma Sect of Himalayan Buddhism. The village is near Salleri (सल्लेरी), which is the headquarters of the Solukhumbu district in the Sagarmatha Zone of eastern Nepal.

== Transportation ==
The most common ways to reach the Khoriya village from Kathmandu are by (a) Taking a jeep or bike directly from Kathmandu, which takes approximately 8 to 9 hours.(b) flying to Phaplu and then taking a taxi or bike for half an hour, (c) taking a bus to Jiri and 2 to 3 day walk. (d) flying to Lukla and a 2 to 3-day walk.
