= Haripur, Sarlahi =

Haripur हरिपुर हरपुर
- Municipality
- Location in Nepal
- Coordinates: 26.97°N 85.26°E
- Country: Nepal
- Development Region: Central Development region
- Zone: Janakpur zone
- District: Sarlahi District
- Province: Province No. 2
- Established: 2016 A.D. (2073 B.S.)

Government
  - Mayor: Gopal Panjiyar (NC)
  - Deputy Mayor: Nikam Raya Yadav (NC)

Area
  - Total: 66.86 km^{2} (25.81 sq mi)

Population (2011)
  - Total: 47,187
  - Density: 705.8/km^{2} (1,828/sq mi)
  - Religions: Hindu Muslim Christian

Languages
  - Local: Maithili, Tharu, Nepali
- Time zone: UTC+5:45 (NST)
- Postal Code: 45800
- Area code: 046
- Website: http://www.haripurmun.gov.np/

Haripur (Nepali: हरिपुर) is municipality in Sarlahi District, a part of Province No. 2 in Nepal. It was formed in 2017 occupying current 9 sections (wards) from previous 9 former VDCs. It occupies an area of 66.86 km^{2} with a total population of 47,187.
