= Dumariya =

Place in haripurwa Municipality, Nepal

Dumariya-(Balara Municipality, Nepal) डुमरिया(बलरा नगरपालिका,नेपाल)
- Nickname: Balara-Dumariya(बलरा-डुमरिया)
- Location in Nepal
- Coordinates: 26°48′0″N 85°23′0″E
- Country: Nepal
- Municipality: Balara Municipality
- District: Sarlahi District

Population (1991)
  - Total: 3,026
- Time zone: UTC+5:45 (Nepal Time)

Dumariya is a Ward No.7 of Balara Municipality in Sarlahi District in the Madhesh Province, of south-eastern Nepal. At the time of the 1991 Nepal census it had a population of 3,026 people living in 582 individual households.
