= Kabilasi, Sarlahi =

Kabilasi कबिलासी
- Municipality
- Location in Nepal
- Coordinates: 26°56′30″N 85°33′0″E
- Country: Nepal
- Zone: Janakpur Zone
- District: Sarlahi District

Population (1991)
  - Total: 7,050
- Time zone: UTC+5:45 (Nepal Time)
- Website: http://kawilasimun.gov.np/

Kabilasi is a municipality in Sarlahi District in the Janakpur Zone of south-eastern Nepal. At the time of the 1991 Nepal census it had a population of 7,050 people residing in 1,362 individual households.
