= Market area =

A market area is a geographic zone where a supply or demand is offered; e.g. for a retail store, the area of its customers, and for a factory, its distribution area. The market area of a media market is an area served by the same broadcast stations and other media outlets.

== See also ==
- GIS
- Market (economics)
