= Malangwa =

Headquarter and municipality of Sarlahi district, Nepal

Malangwa मलंगवा
- Municipality
- Nickname: Oldest Municipality of Sarlahi District.
- Location in Nepal
- Country: Nepal
- Province: Madesh
- District: Sarlahi
- Named for: Malang Baba

Government
  - Type: Mayor–council government
  - Mayor: Nagendra Prasad Yadav (Nepali Congress)
  - Deputy mayor: Sakuntala Devi Sah (Nepali Congress)

Area
  - Total: 30.44 km^{2} (11.75 sq mi)
- Elevation: 79 m (259 ft)

Population (2011)
  - Total: 46,516
  - Density: 1,528/km^{2} (3,958/sq mi)
- Demonym: Malangwans Nepali
- Time zone: UTC+05:45 (NST)
- Postal code: 45800
- Area code: 046
- Vehicle registration: JA-1-P
- Languages: Maithili Bajjika
- Website: malangwamun.gov.np

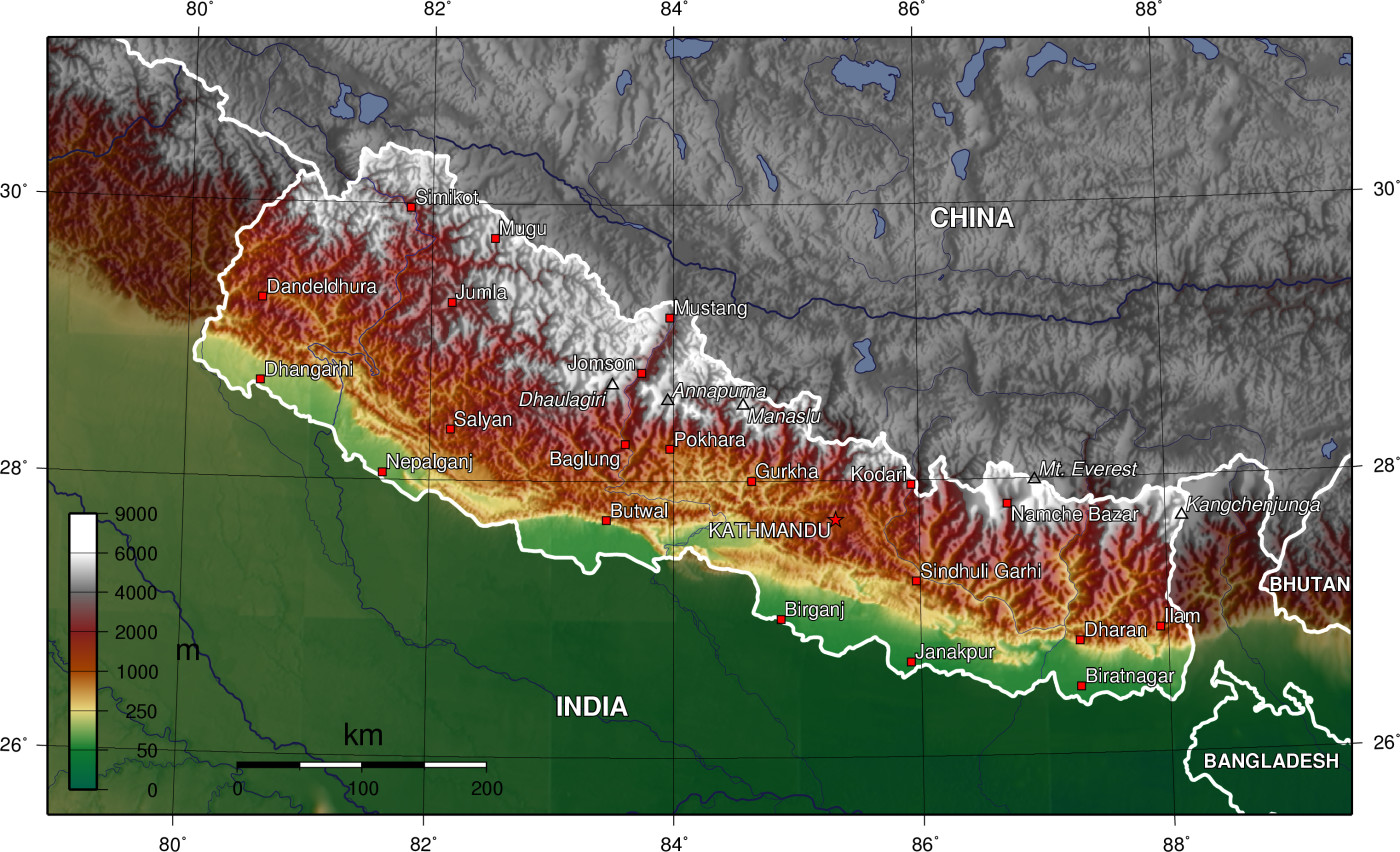
Topographical map of Nepal. The green and yellow zones contain the Inner Terai Valleys.

Malangwa (Devanagari: मलंगवा) is a town, a municipality, and the headquarter of Sarlahi District in Madhesh Province of Nepal. The district's oldest municipality is in Parliamentary Constituency 2. From the Mahendra Highway 25 kilometres (16 mi) south of Nawalpur, a small highway-side town. Situated at an altitude of 79 meters (259 ft) above sea level, Malangwa is near the Indian border at Sonbarsa. There is a customs checkpoint at the border crossing.

== Etymology ==
Its name is derived from Malang Baba, a saint who is worshipped by both Hindus and Muslims. An annual fair is held in his honour during the month of Chaitra Malangbaba puja, at which people offer chadar and pray for their well-being.

== Demographics ==
According to the municipality (CBS:2012), Malangwa had a population of 46,516 people in about 8,020 households. Most had Madhesi( Yadav, Kushwaha, Mahato, Kayastha, Kalwar, sahuji/sah, koeri and Brahman), Newari and Marwadi backgrounds.

Even though the official language spoken at offices and schools is Nepali, most of the native people of Malangwa speak Bajjika as their mother tongue.

== Climate ==
Climate zone	Elevation	% of area
Lower tropical	below 300 metres (980 ft)	94.4%
Upper tropical	300 to 1,000 metres (3,300 ft)	5.6%

Malangwa has a humid tropical climate, with a mean annual rainfall of 2,214 mm (87.2 in) between 1995 and 2006. More than 80 percent of the total annual rainfall occurs during the monsoon season, from June to September. Average temperatures range from 8.08 °C (46.54 °F) in January to 34 °C (93 °F) in June.

In the past, the inner and outer Terai were a formidable barrier between Nepal and potential invaders from India. The Terai's marshes and forests were infested with anopheline mosquitos, which carried virulent strains of malaria, especially during the hot spring and rainy summer monsoon.

There are several climatic differences in climate among the eastern edge of the Terai (Biratnagar), the western edge (Nepaljung) and Malangwa, although all are on the same plain. The climate is more continental inland (away from Bay of Bengal monsoon sources), with a greater difference between summer and winter. In the far western Terai (five degrees of latitude further north), the coldest months average 4 °C (39 °F) cooler. Total rainfall diminishes from east to west. The monsoon arrives later, is less intense and ends sooner. However, winters are wetter in the west.

Climate data for Malangwa (Manusmara) (1991–2020 normals)
Month	Jan	Feb	Mar	Apr	May	Jun	Jul	Aug	Sep	Oct	Nov	Dec	Year
Mean daily maximum °C (°F)	21.5 (70.7)	25.8 (78.4)	31.0 (87.8)	35.2 (95.4)	35.6 (96.1)	35.1 (95.2)	33.5 (92.3)	33.5 (92.3)	33.1 (91.6)	32.1 (89.8)	29.2 (84.6)	24.2 (75.6)	30.8 (87.5)
Daily mean °C (°F)	15.0 (59.0)	18.4 (65.1)	23.0 (73.4)	27.7 (81.9)	29.6 (85.3)	30.4 (86.7)	29.9 (85.8)	29.8 (85.6)	29.2 (84.6)	26.8 (80.2)	22.1 (71.8)	17.2 (63.0)	24.9 (76.9)
Mean daily minimum °C (°F)	8.5 (47.3)	10.9 (51.6)	15.0 (59.0)	20.1 (68.2)	23.6 (74.5)	25.7 (78.3)	26.2 (79.2)	26.1 (79.0)	25.3 (77.5)	21.5 (70.7)	15.0 (59.0)	10.2 (50.4)	19.0 (66.2)
Average precipitation mm (inches)	9.3 (0.37)	12.0 (0.47)	10.1 (0.40)	44.7 (1.76)	88.8 (3.50)	189.0 (7.44)	440.8 (17.35)	356.4 (14.03)	188.4 (7.42)	75.2 (2.96)	4.9 (0.19)	7.5 (0.30)	1,427 (56.18)
Source 1: Department of Hydrology and Meteorology
Source 2: JICA (precipitation)

== Location ==
Malangwa is bordered on the north by kabilasi Municipality; on the south and southeast by Sonbarsha, Sitamarhi district, Bihar, India; on the east by Brahampuri Rural Municipality on the west by Motipur.

Malangwa shares a border crossing with India. No documents are required to cross the border, but many edible and electronic products are restricted. A customs office tracks vehicles entering Malangwa with an Indian vehicle registration number, and taxes are imposed on heavy items entering Nepal.

== Media and Telecommunications ==
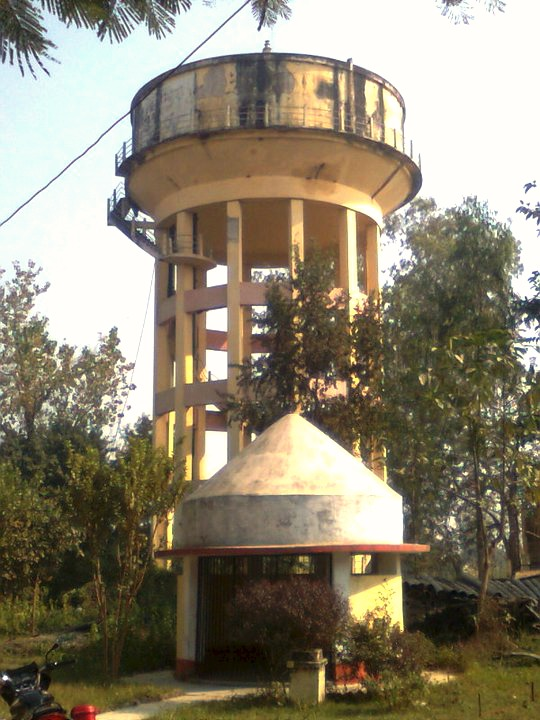
Malangwa water supply

To promote local culture, Malangwa has four FM community radio stations: Radio Madhesh (89.3 MHz), Radio Malangwa (93.6) and Swarnim FM (96.3). Major daily newspapers are the Madhesh Post, Loktantra Dainik, Terai Patrika and the Sarlahi Times. Online News Portal Press4K, Mero Malangwa.

Nepal Telecom has 4G network coverage with better speed, and Ncell has 4G network coverage with available cellular networks. ADSL, Nepal Telecom, NCELL and private internet service are Internet service providers in the town. The town also has FTTH connections from Nepal Telecom, Worldlink, Subisu, Dish Home and a few others.

== Non Governmental Organizations (NGOs) ==
Malangwa, the headquarter of Sarlahi District in Madhesh Province, Nepal is home to several non-govrnmental organizations (NGOs) like Laxmi Blood Connects, We Care We Can, JCI Malangwa, RRPK, WCWS and few others are dedicated to various social and developmental causes.

== Cinemas ==
Malangwa has one movie theatre named Pushpa Talkies, which attracts cross-border audiences. The theaters show Nepali, Bollywood, South indian hindi dubbed and Bhojpuri-language Movies.

== Attacks ==
Two attacks have occurred in Malangwa, the first at the end of the Nepalese Civil War. The town was attacked by Maoists on April 5, 2006, at 8:00 pm. The insurgents fired at soldiers guarding government offices and security posts and attacked a jail, freeing more than 100 inmates (including some of their comrades) before fleeing. The Russian-built, night-vision-equipped MI-17 helicopter with the call sign RAN-37 took off from Kathmandu at 10 pm to counter the attack. Eyewitnesses reported that the helicopter hovered for an hour, returned after refuelling in Simra and exploded in mid-air at about 1:30 am; eight of the 10 soldiers aboard were killed. Five police personnel, four Maoists and two civilians were reported killed in clashes. Security personnel, including Chief District Officer Bhojraj Adhikari, were abducted and later released. A high alert was sounded along the 800-kilometre (500 mi) Indo-Nepal border immediately after the incident. Across the border in India, a joint Sashastra Seema Bal and CRPF team maintained surveillance on the border to thwart any further attacks.

On September 13, 2013, 10 people were injured (three critically) when a bomb exploded in a district office at about 11:45 am. Office records were destroyed in the ensuing fire.

== Earthquakes ==
Although Malangwa experienced severe tremors from the April 2015 Nepal earthquake, it had no significant damage. However, the town was destroyed by the 1934 Nepal–Bihar earthquake.

== Sports ==
The most popular sports in Malangwa are cricket and football. For sports, Two playgrounds are used mostly for sports: Covered Hall & DDC Field.

== Transport ==
Malangwa, 204.1 kilometres (126.8 mi) by road from Kathmandu, is connected to other parts of the country by bus. Bus service runs to Kathmandu, Birgunj, Janakpurdham, Pokhara, Biratnagar, Dharan, Gaur, and Bharatpur, and the town has one of Nepal's largest bus stations. The Malangwa-Nawalpur Highway (MG Highway) joins the East-West Highway at Nawalpur, connecting Malangwa to all major Nepalese cities.

The nearest domestic airport, Janakpur Airport, is in Dhanusha District; Nijgadh International Airport is under construction in Nijgadh. International passengers use Kathmandu's Tribhuvan International Airport for international flight.

All major cities of India may be reached on Indian Railways, and the government of India has built a four-lane highway from Sonbarsha to Patna. The Sitamarhi Junction railway station is about 36 kilometres (22 mi) from Malangwa, and tanga and rickshaw service is available to go across the border.

Cycles, rickshaws and taxis serve the city center, and auto rickshaws are available for longer distances. Electric rickshaws are popular.

== Tourism ==
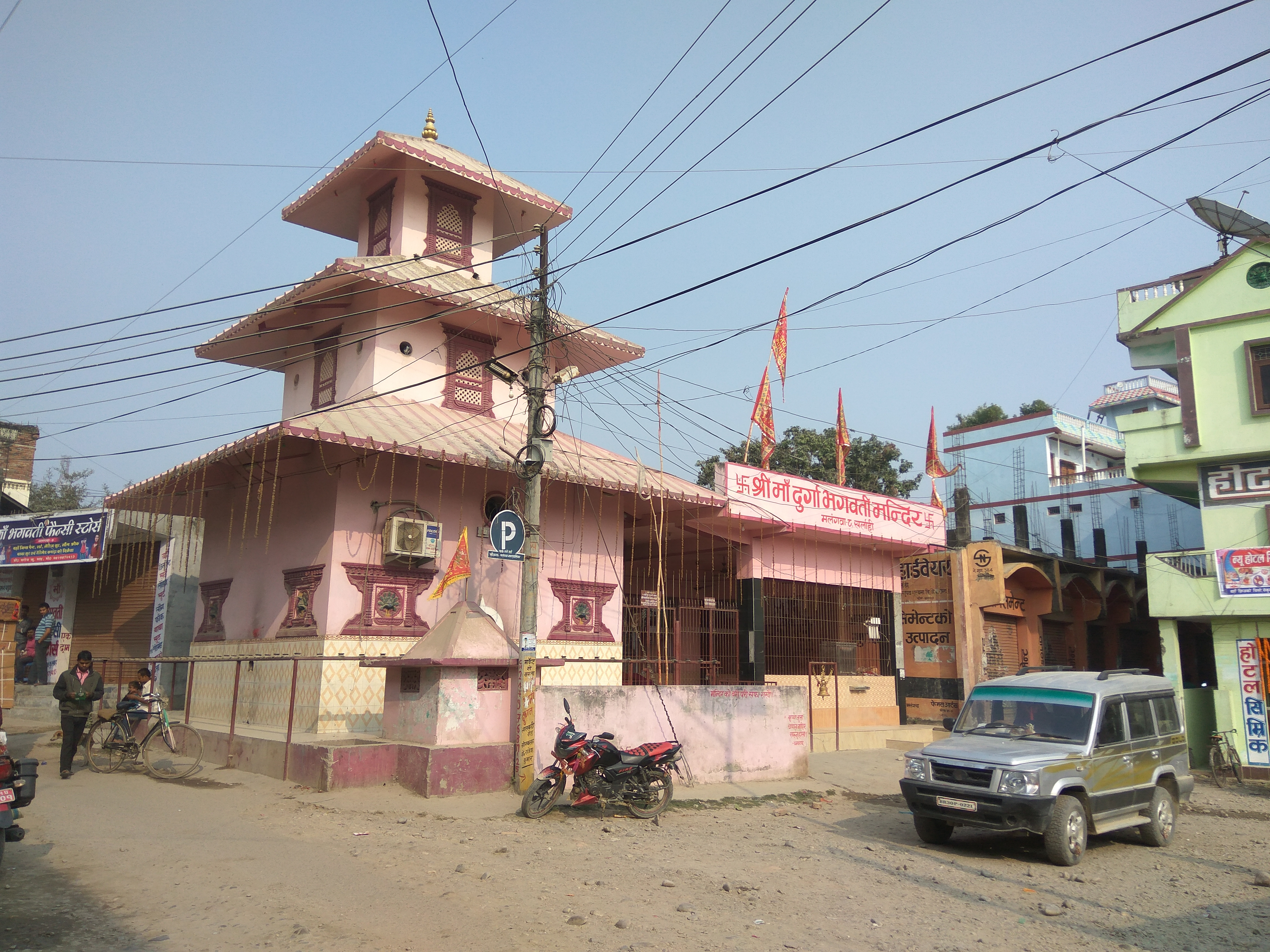
Durga Devi temple

A number of tourists access the border connection with India and visit temples in Malangwa like Malangbaba, Durga Devi Temple, Rajdevi Temple, etc.

== Notable residents ==
- Bishwonath Upadhyaya
- Rajendra Mahato
- Aashiq Ali Mikrani
- Gulsan Jha
- Gautam gamvir jha
