= Lakhandei River =

River in southern Nepal and India

Lakhandei

Location
- Country: India, Nepal

Physical characteristics
- Source
  - location: Sivalik Hills, Nepal
- Mouth
  - location: Bagmati River at Katra Muzaffarpur district

The Lakhandei River is a river in southern Nepal and in the state of Bihar in India. It is a main tributary of the Bagmati River.

In Nepal, the river basin lies in the Sarlahi District, and the river originates in the Sivalik Hills. The river enters India in the Sitamarhi district of Bihar, and flows through the town of Sitamarhi. It floods heavily in Sitamarhi. It then enters the Muzaffarpur district, and joins the Bagmati at Katra (within the Muzaffarpur district). Before joining the Bagmati, the Lakhandei splits into two parts, one joins the Bagmati and the other remains open and is known as Kali Khadai near Khangura village.

The Lankhandei is known for flooding.

== See also ==
- List of rivers in India
