= Sarlahi District =

District in Madhesh Province and eastern Terai region of Nepal

Coordinates: 26.855712°N 85.562360°E

Sarlahi District सर्लाही जिल्ला
- District
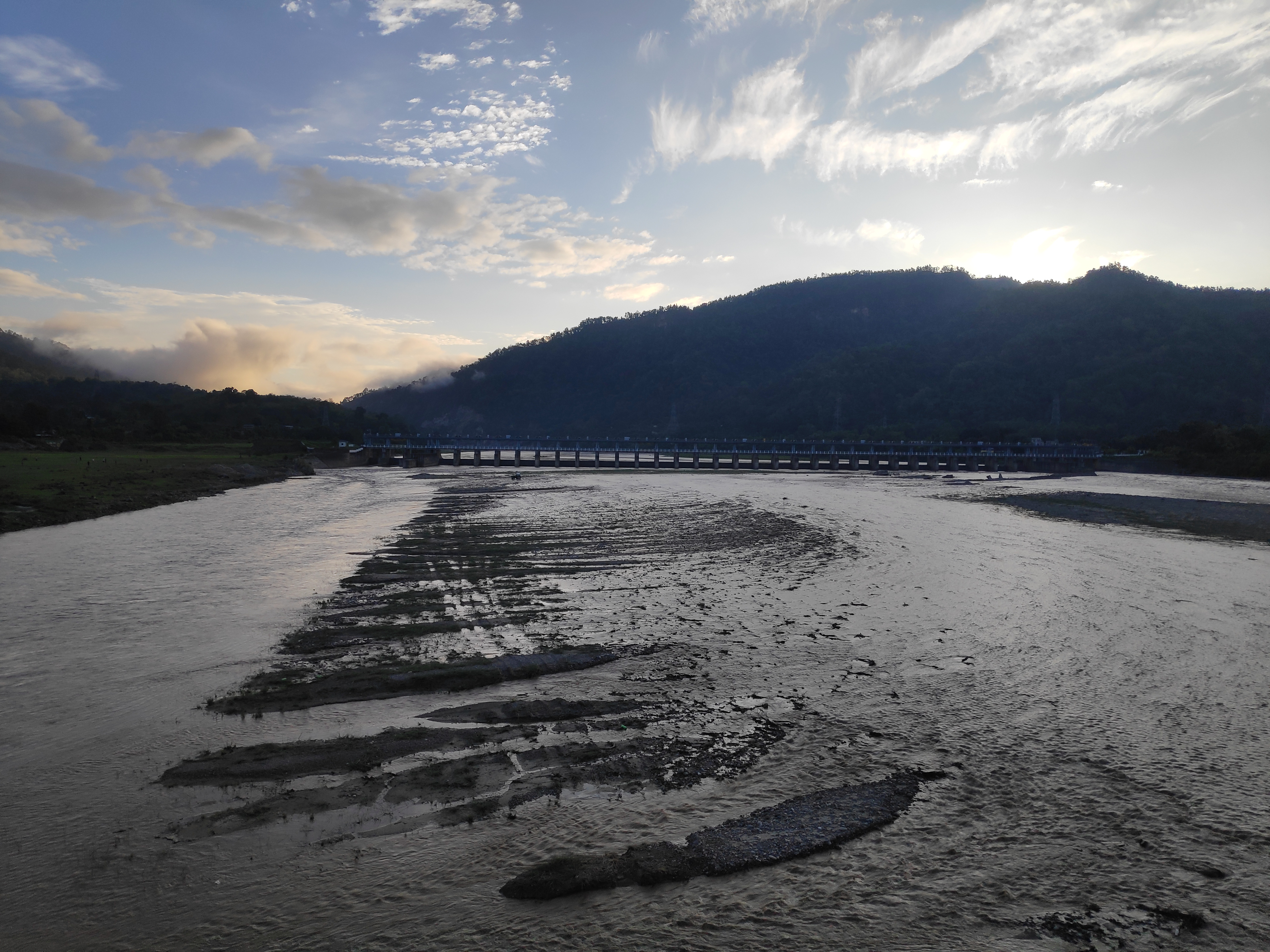
- Bagmati River at Sarlahi

- Sarlahi District (dark yellow) in Madhesh Province
- Country: Nepal
- Region: Mithila
- Province: Madhesh
- Admin HQ.: Malangwa

Government
  - Type: Coordination committee
  - Body: DCC, Sarlahi

Area
  - Total: 1,259 km^{2} (486 sq mi)

Population (2021)
  - Total: 862,470
  - Density: 685.0/km^{2} (1,774/sq mi)
- Time zone: UTC+05:45 (NPT)
- Telephone Code: 046
- Main Language(s): Bajjika, Maithili and Nepali
- Website: www.ddcsarlahi.gov.np

Sarlahi (Maithili: सर्लाही) is one of the seventy-seven districts of Nepal. Being one of eight districts of Madhesh Province, it is an Outer Terai district, which borders Rautahat district to the west, Mahottari district to the east, Sindhuli district to the north, and the Indian state of Bihar to the south. The district, with Malangwa as its headquarter, covers an area of 1,259 km^{2} (486 sq mi) and has a population of 862,470 in 2021.

== Temples and other historic sites ==
- The famous temple, Chameli Mai lies in Salempur of Sarlahi District where number of devotees from Country and a part of India come to seek blessing .
- The historical Nunthar Pahad is located in a strategic place bordering four districts: Makawanpur, Sarlahi, Rautahat and Sindhuli.
- The Mukteshwar Nath temple is located in Murtiya village.
- The Nadiman lake, an important Puranic place, is located nearby Malangawa which is believed to be the yaksha pool (kunda), the mystic lake owned by the yaksha himself. The Pattharkot temple is also the best known religious place there.
- Balara Municipality is home to the Sitlamai Temple, Bajrangbali Temple, Durga Temple, Gadhimai Temple, and Laxmipur Pokhari.
- The Sagaranatha temple in Iswarpur, the Gopalkuti Mahadev temple in Karmaiya, among many others, are equally significant places in Sarlahi.
- The most emerging city and the main trading site of the Sarlahi district is Lalbandi and is also known as the education hub of the district. It is located in Lalbandi municipality which is the largest municipality of the district too. Lalbandi is well known for tomato production, with tomatoes being one of the municipality's major cash crops.

== Geography and climate ==
Climate Zone	Elevation Range	% of Area
Lower Tropical	below 300 meters (1,000 ft)	88.3%
Upper Tropical	300 to 1,000 meters 1,000 to 3,300 ft.	11.7%

== Geographical division ==
According to geographical texture, Sarlahi district is divided into three parts.

- Chure Hills of North
- Bhabar region of middle
- Terai region of south

=== Chure mountain ===
On the north side of the district from east to west is the mountain range known as the Sivalik Hills. They have an average height of 900 metres (3,000 ft), reaching 1,350 metres (4,430 ft) in places. This range separates the Terai from the inner Terai and harbours the fossilised remains of many mammals no longer typical of Eurasia.

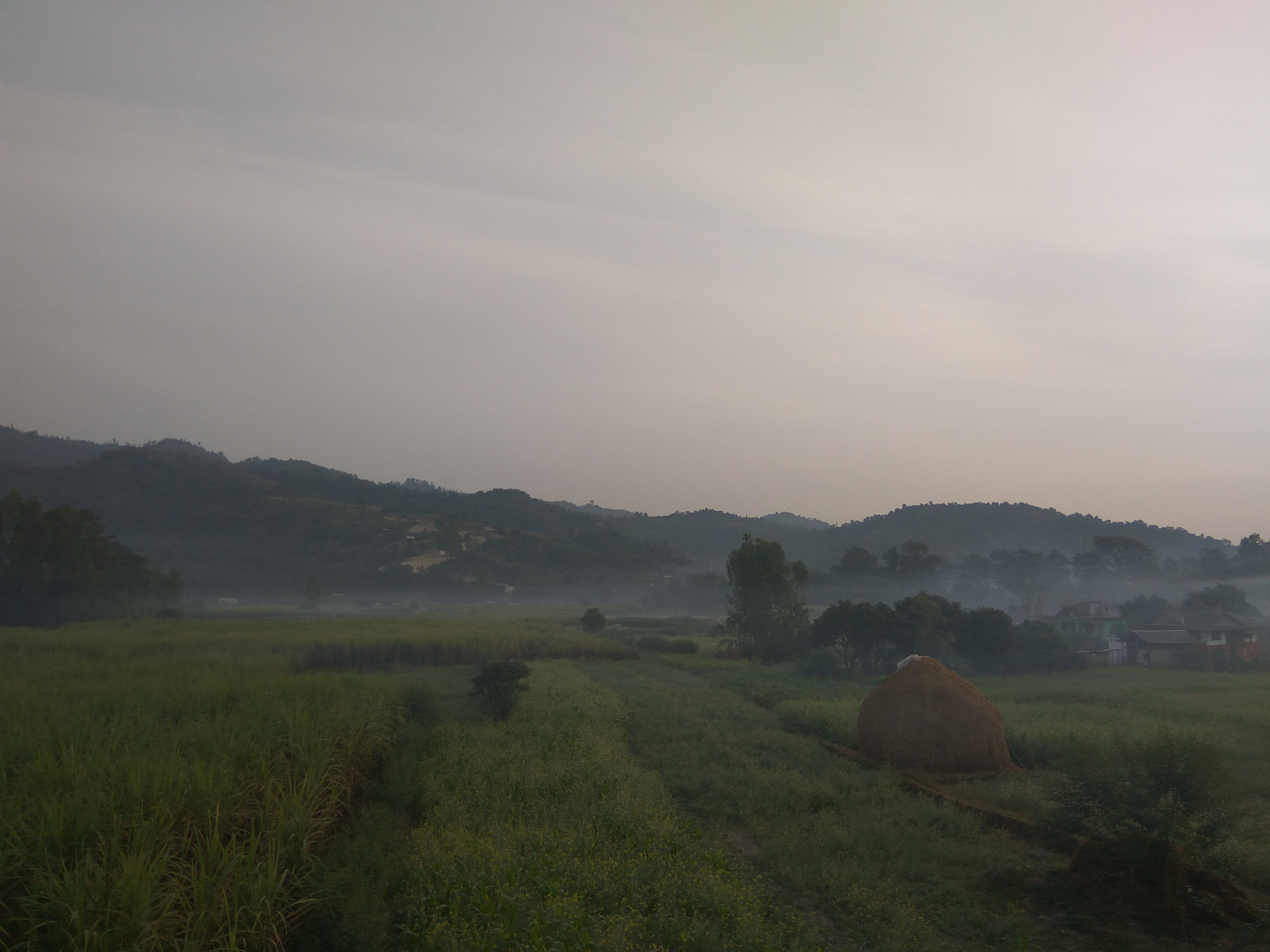
Chure mountain

=== Bhabar region ===
This region is between Chure range and the Outer Terai region. In the local language, it is also known as Charkose Jhadi. The height of the region is from 150 to 300 metres (490 to 980 ft). The Mahendra Highway touches this area, so settlement is increasing. In the region, the water source level is always very low; even the following water disappears because of sandiness. It is very difficult to obtain water by digging. Irrigation is problematic in the area.

=== Terai region ===
The Terai region, plains, forms the southernmost part of Nepal and goes to India's Bihar. Since ancient times, the region has had large public density and is a good place for farming, so it is called Treasurer of grain.

== Rivers ==
There are four major rivers in this district that flow into India: the Bagmati and Manushmara river "(sisaut)" the Hardi (Banke), the Lakhandei and the Jhim. However, there are around a dozen other small rivulets that originate from the Chure hills and flow down the plain. They are actually the tributaries of the three major river systems of the district. These small rivulets are the Hariwan khola, the Dhungre khola, the Soti khola, the Sotraha khola, the Chapini khola, the Pathlaiya khola, he Kalinjor khola, the Phooljor khola and the Banke Khola. The Banke Khola is the eastern demarcation of the district separating it from Mahottari district, whereas the Bagmati river flows between Sarlahi and Rautahat districts.

- Bagmati river system: it is the largest river, flowing in the western side of district separating Rautahat district from Sarlahi.
- Lakhandei river system: this river is the largest river inside the district; it is about 25 kilometers long. It originates from the Chure Mountain range, the lowest foothills of the Great Himalayan ranges. It flows into India by touching Simara village development committee (VDC) of this district.
- Jhim river system: originating from the northeast side of the Chure mountains of this district into the Phuljor and Kalinjor rivers, it joins at the Vairawpur village of Jabdi VDC, then it becomes Jhim river. It is 29 km (18 mi) long and by flowing into districts passes into India, and in India this river is known as Adhwara river. Adhwara river was the east border of Makwanpur region.

Banke (Hardi Nadi) river. Banke river was the east border of Sarlhi district. There are also many rivers in this district including the Adhwara River of the east which empties into the Jhim River, Manushmara river (which is formed by mixing Harion, Sotara and Pathlaiya rivers), and in middle of the district Dhangra and Bhumi rivers.

- Bhatauliya river system: this river is the medium river inside the district; it is about 10 kilometers long. It originates from the Soram range. It flows into India by touching Bhatauliya VDC of this district.

== Demographics ==
Historical population
Census year	Pop.	±% p.a.
1981	398,766	—
1991	492,798	+2.14%
2001	635,701	+2.58%
2011	769,729	+1.93%
2021	862,470	+1.14%
Source: Citypopulation

At the time of the 2021 Nepal census, Sarlahi District had a population of 862,470. 10.09% of the population is under 5 years of age. It has a literacy rate of 60.31% and a sex ratio of 982 females per 1000 males. 595,893 (69.09%) lived in municipalities.

Ethnic groups/castes in Sarlahi district (2021)
1. Yadav (16.1%)
2. Muslim (8.53%)
3. Kushwaha (8.26%)
4. Teli (5.64%)
5. Tamang (5.12%)
6. Paswan (3.90%)
7. Chamar (3.76%)
8. Chhetri (3.33%)
9. Mallaah (3.01%)
10. Tharu (2.81%)
11. Kurmi (2.35%)
12. Bahun (2.33%)
13. Kalwar (2.21%)
14. Other Madheshi non-Dalit (19.7%)
15. Other Madheshi Dalit (5.13%)
16. Other Hill Janjati (4.72%)
17. Khas Dalit (1.38%)
18. Others (1.78%)

Ethnicity/caste: Madheshis are the largest group. Yadavs and Muslims are the largest two communities. Khas and Hill Janjati communities make up a large fraction of the population.

Religions in Sarlahi district (2021)
Religion	Percent
Hinduism	85.69%
Islam	8.89%
Buddhism	4.99%
Other or not stated†	0.43%
Distribution of religions †Includes Christianity, Kirats, Jainism (<0.001%).

Religion: 85.6% were Hindu, 7.9% Muslim, 5.7% Buddhist, 0.3% Prakriti, 0.2% Christian and 0.3% others.

Languages of Sarlahi district (2021)
1. Bajjika (50.0%)
2. Maithili (25.7%)
3. Nepali (8.55%)
4. Tamang (4.28%)
5. Urdu (2.92%)
6. Magahi (2.53%)
7. Tharu (2.53%)
8. Magar (1.42%)
9. Others (2.09%)

Bajjika is the largest language. Maithili is the second-largest language. Nepali is spoken by 8% of the population. Urdu and Tharu are spoken by a small minority.

== Media ==
From Sarlahi district, newspapers and FM radio stations are as follows:

Newspapers: Loktantra Dainik, Paricharcha, Madhesh Post Daily, Suchna Saugat Weekly, Sarlahi Awaz Weekly, and Sarlahi Times Weekly.

Name	Frequency Range	Location	Status→←≥
Samudayak Radio Sarlahi	105.7 MHz	Hariyon	Broadcast
Swarnim FM	96.3 MHz	Malangwa	Broadcast
Radio Madhesh	89.3 MHz	Malangwa	Broadcast
Radio Ekta	92.4 MHz	Lalbandi	Broadcast
Radio Dhukdhuki	95.6 MHz	Lalbandi	Broadcast
Radio Mukteshower	100.4 MHz	Barahatwa	Broadcast
Radio Barahathawa	101.1 MHz	Barahathawa	Broadcast

== Sarlahi constituencies ==
There are a total of four electoral consttituncies for House of Representatives and eight for Provincial assembly which are as below.

- Sarlahi 1
- Sarlahi 2
- Sarlahi 3
- Sarlahi 4

== Administration ==
The district consists of twenty municipalities, out of which eleven are urban municipalities and nine are rural municipalities. These are as follows:

- Bagmati Municipality
- Balara Municipality
- Barahathwa Municipality
- Godaita Municipality
- Harion Municipality
- Haripur Municipality
- Haripurwa Municipality
- Ishworpur Municipality
- Kabilasi Municipality
- Lalbandi Municipality
- Malangwa Municipality
- Basbariya Rural Municipality
- Bishnu Rural Municipality
- Brahampuri Rural Municipality
- Chakraghatta Rural Municipality
- Chandranagar Rural Municipality
- Dhankaul Rural Municipality
- Kaudena Rural Municipality
- Parsa Rural Municipality
- Ramnagar Rural Municipality

=== Former Village Development Committees (VDCs) ===
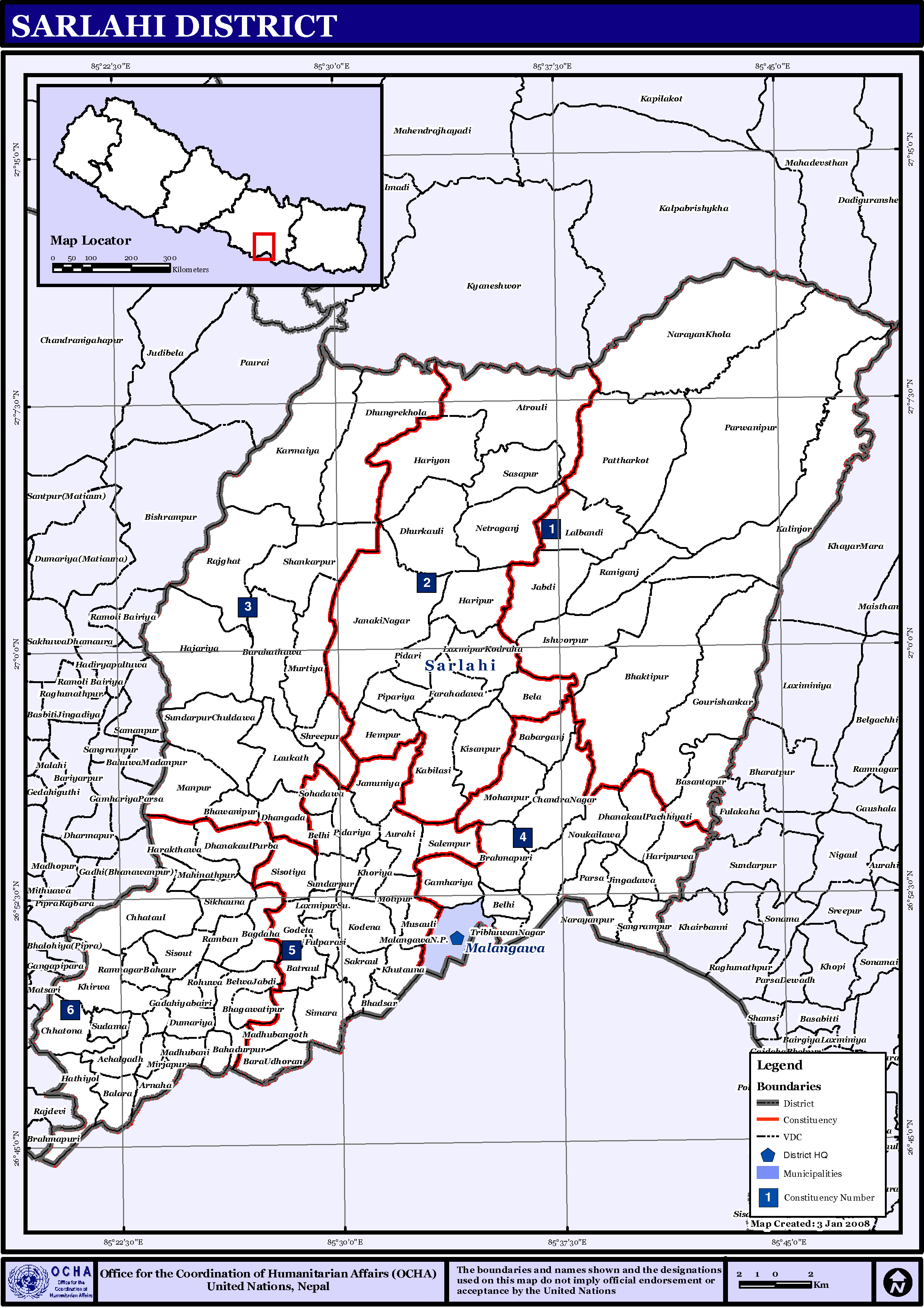
Map of the VDCs in Sarlahi District

- Achalgadh
- Arnaha
- Atrauli
- Aurahi
- Babarganj
- Bagdaha
- Bahadurpur
- Balara
- Bara Udhoran
- Barahathawa
- Basantapur
- Batraul
- Bela
- Belhi
- Bhelhi
- Belwajabdi
- Bhadsar
- Bhagawatipur
- Bhaktipur
- Bhawanipur
- Brahmapuri
- Chandranagar
- Chhotaul
- Chhatauna
- Dhankaul Pachhawari
- Dhanakaul Purba
- Dhangadha
- Dhungrekhola
- Dhurkauli
- Dumariya
- Gadahiya
- Gamhariya
- Godaita
- Gaurishankar
- Hajariya
- Harakthawa
- Haripur
- Haripurwa
- Hariwan
- Hathiaul
- Hempur
- Ishworpur
- Jabdi
- Jamuniya
- Janaki Nagar
- Jingadawa
- Kabilasi
- Kalinjor
- Karmaihiya
- Khairwa
- Khoriya
- Khutauna
- Kisanpur
- Kaudena
- Lalbandi
- Laukath
- Laxmipur Kodraha
- Laxmipur Su.
- Madhubangoth
- Madhubani
- Mahinathpur
- Malangwa Municipality
- Manpur
- Mirjapur
- Mohanpur
- Motipur
- Murtiya
- Musauli
- Narayan Khola
- Narayanpur
- Netraganj
- Naukailawa
- Parsa
- Parwanipur
- Pattharkot
- Pharahadawa
- Phulparasi
- Pidari
- Pidariya
- Pipariya
- Rajghat
- Ramnagar Bahuarwa
- Ranban
- Raniganj
- Rohuwa
- Sakraul
- Salempur
- Sangrampur
- Shankarpur
- Sasapur
- Shreeur
- Sekhauna
- Simara
- Sisautiya
- Sisaut
- Sohadawa
- Sudama
- Sundarpur
- Sundarpur Choharwa
- Tribhuwannagar

== Notable people ==
- Sambhu Lal Shrestha, Nepali Congress leader and former Minister for Agriculture of Nepal
- Jangi Lal Ray, Nepali Congress leader and former member of Constituent Assembly
- Rajendra Mahato, Sadbhawana party politician and former minister who left district for election purpose after unsuccessful attempts in general elections
- Mahendra Raya Yadav, member of House of Representatives and Minister for Agriculture of Nepal
- Pramod Sah, member of House of Representatives
- Birendra Prasad Singh, Nepali Congress leader, member of Provincial Assembly and Minister in Government of Madhesh Province.
- Nikhil Upreti, a well known Nepali actor and Producer. He has worked in numbers of Nepali Movies like Pijada, Dhadkan, Hami Tin Bhai, Bhairab and so on.
- Gulsan Jha, A national cricketer who has played so many games for Nepal and is currently playing for Nepal.

== See also ==
- Zones of Nepal
- "Districts of Nepal". Statoids.
