= Elections in Nepal =

There are three types of elections in Nepal: elections to the federal parliament, elections to the provincial assemblies and elections to the local government. Within each of these categories, there may be by-elections as well as general elections. Currently three electoral systems are used: parallel voting for the House of Representatives and provincial assemblies, single transferable vote for the National Assembly, and first-past-the-post for local elections.

== Latest elections ==
Full entry 2026 Nepalese general election

Party	Proportional			Constituency			Total seats	+/–
Party	Votes	%	Seats	Votes	%	Seats	Total seats	+/–
Rastriya Swatantra Party	5,183,493	47.84	57	4,650,697	44.17	125	182	+162
Nepali Congress	1,759,172	16.24	20	2,008,639	19.08	18	38	–51
CPN (Unified Marxist–Leninist)	1,455,885	13.44	16	1,623,159	15.42	9	25	–53
Nepali Communist Party	811,577	7.49	9	976,016	9.27	8	17	–28
Shram Sanskriti Party	385,902	3.56	4	303,902	2.89	3	7	New
Rastriya Prajatantra Party	330,684	3.05	4	207,270	1.97	1	5	–9
People's Socialist Party, Nepal	182,285	1.68	0	193,303	1.84	0	0	–12
Rastriya Pariwartan Party	172,489	1.59	0	10,006	0.10	0	0	New
Janamat Party	79,435	0.73	0	63,764	0.61	0	0	–6
RMP-N – PSP – NUP-N	62,069	0.57	0	50,049	0.48	0	0	New
Nepal Workers Peasants Party	42,299	0.39	0	41,018	0.39	0	0	–1
Rashtra Nirman Dal Nepal	39,577	0.37	0	5,030	0.05	0	0	New
Rastriya Janamorcha	29,456	0.27	0	24,793	0.24	0	0	–1
NFSN – Bahujan Ekta Party Nepal – Nepal Janajagriti Party	29,436	0.27	0	10,160	0.10	0	0	–
Nepal Janata Samrakshyan Party	28,424	0.26	0	588	0.01	0	0	–
Pragatisheel Loktantrik Party	24,676	0.23	0	24,939	0.24	0	0	New
Communist Party of Nepal (Maoist)	23,867	0.22	0	32,099	0.30	0	0	–
Mongol National Organisation	20,829	0.19	0	17,898	0.17	0	0	–
Aam Janata Party – Janadesh Party	19,832	0.18	0	19,918	0.19	0	0	New
Sarwabhuam Nagarik Party	14,886	0.14	0	1,716	0.02	0	0	–
Rastriya Mukti Andolan, Nepal	10,725	0.10	0	569	0.01	0	0	–
Samyukta Nagarik Party	9,142	0.08	0	1,866	0.02	0	0	–
Swabhiman Party	8,144	0.08	0	11,404	0.11	0	0	–
Rastriya Janamukti Party	7,208	0.07	0	3,599	0.03	0	0	–
Nepal Janata Party	7,164	0.07	0	2,537	0.02	0	0	–
Rastriya Ekta Dal	7,071	0.07	0	1,455	0.01	0	0	–
Communist Party of Nepal (Marxist–Leninist)	6,172	0.06	0			0	0	–
Rastriya Gaurav Party	5,250	0.05	0			0	0	–
National Republic Nepal	5,160	0.05	0	4,862	0.05	0	0	New
Gatisheel Loktantrik Party	5,101	0.05	0	229	0.00	0	–	–
Nepalka Lagi Nepali Party	5,019	0.05	0	2,881	0.03	0	0	–
Communist Party of Nepal Marxist (Pushpalal)	4,835	0.04	0	408	0.00	0	0	–
Sanghiya Loktantrik Rastriya Manch	4,678	0.04	0	2,129	0.02	0	0	–
Communist Party of Nepal (United)	4,515	0.04	0	1,680	0.02	0	0	–
Rastriya Urjasheel Party, Nepal	4,319	0.04	0	4,304	0.04	0	0	–
Samabeshi Samajbadi Party Nepal	4,288	0.04	0	393	0.00	0	0	–
Nepal Loktantrik Party	4,123	0.04	0	320	0.00	0	0	–
Nepal Matribhumi Party	3,228	0.03	0	23	0.00	0	0	–
Jaya Matribhumi Party	2,948	0.03	0	707	0.01	0	0	–
Rastriya Janata Party Nepal	2,936	0.03	0	13	0.00	0	0	–
Bahujan Shakti Party	2,775	0.03	0	354	0.00	0	0	–
Prajatantrik Party Nepal	2,245	0.02	0	37	0.00	0	0	–
Nepal Janmukti Party	2,172	0.02	0	835	0.01	0	0	–
Jana Adhikar Party	2,117	0.02	0	544	0.01	0	0	–
Nepal Sadbhawana Party	2,018	0.02	0	109	0.00	0	0	–
People First Party	1,800	0.02	0	369	0.00	0	0	–
Nepali Congress (B.P.)	1,789	0.02	0			0	0	–
Nagarik Shakti, Nepal	1,733	0.02	0			0	0	–
Nepali Janashramdan Sanskriti Party	1,639	0.02	0	172	0.00	0	0	–
Nepali Janata Dal	1,455	0.01	0	256	0.00	0	0	–
Samabeshi Samajbadi Party	1,397	0.01	0	234	0.00	0	0	–
Janata Loktantrik Party, Nepal	1,303	0.01	0	77	0.00	0	0	–
Sachet Nepali Party – Nagarik Sarvochhata Party Nepal	1,132	0.01	0	120	0.00	0	0	–
Janapriya Loktantrik Party	955	0.01	0			0	0	–
Miteri Party Nepal	772	0.01	0	383	0.00	0	0	–
Unnat Loktantra Party	730	0.01	0			0	0	–
Trimul Nepal	694	0.01	0	16	0.00	0	0	–
Ujyaalo Nepal Party			0	115,975	1.10	0	0	New
Rastriya Janamat Party			0	953	0.01	0	0	–
Nepal Manabtabadi Party			0	949	0.01	0	0	–
Rastriya Sajha Party			0	191	0.00	0	0	–
Nepal Janasewa Party			0	159	0.00	0	0	–
United Nepal Democratic Party			0	32	0.00	0	0	–
Itihasik Janata Party			0	18	0.00	0	0	–
Communist Party of Nepal (Marxist)			0	16	0.00	0	0	–
Rastriya Nagarik Party			0	12	0.00	0	0	–
Gandhibadi Party Nepal			0	4	0.00	0	0	–
Independents			0	102,996	0.98	1	1	–2
Total	10,835,025	100.00	110	10,529,154	100.00	165	275	–
Valid votes	10,835,025	96.05		10,559,017	94.55			
Invalid/blank votes	445,592	3.95		609,015	5.45			
Total votes	11,280,617	100.00		11,168,032	100.00			
Registered voters/turnout	18,903,689	59.67		18,903,689	59.08			
Source: Election Commission of Nepal: PR, FPTP

== Results in history ==
Party	Proportional			Constituency			Seats	
Party	Votes	%	Seats	Votes	%	Seats	Nominated	Total
Communist Party of Nepal (Maoist)	3,144,204	29.28	100	3,145,519	30.52	120	9	229
Nepali Congress	2,269,883	21.14	73	2,348,890	22.79	37	5	115
Communist Party of Nepal (Unified Marxist-Leninist)	2,183,370	20.33	70	2,229,064	21.63	33	5	108
Madheshi Jana Adhikar Forum, Nepal	678,327	6.32	22	634,154	6.15	30	2	54
Terai Madhesh Loktantrik Party	338,930	3.16	11	345,587	3.35	9	1	21
Rastriya Prajatantra Party	263,431	2.45	8	310,214	3.01	0	0	8
Communist Party of Nepal (Marxist–Leninist)	243,545	2.27	8	168,196	1.63	0	1	9
Sadbhavana Party	167,517	1.56	5	174,086	1.69	4	0	9
Janamorcha Nepal	164,381	1.53	5	136,846	1.33	2	1	8
Communist Party of Nepal (United)	154,968	1.44	5	39,100	0.38	0	0	5
Rastriya Prajatantra Party Nepal	110,519	1.03	4	76,684	0.74	0	0	4
Rastriya Janamorcha	106,224	0.99	3	93,578	0.91	1	0	4
Rastriya Janshakti Party	102,147	0.95	3	79,925	0.78	0	0	3
Nepal Workers Peasants Party	74,089	0.69	2	65,908	0.64	2	1	5
Sanghiya Loktantrik Rastriya Manch	71,958	0.67	2	36,060	0.35	0	0	2
Nepal Sadbhavana Party (Anandidevi)	55,671	0.52	2	45,254	0.44	0	1	3
Rastriya Janamukti Party	53,910	0.50	2	38,568	0.37	0	0	2
Nepali Janata Dal	48,990	0.46	2	17,162	0.17	0	0	2
Communist Party of Nepal (Unified)	48,600	0.45	2	51,928	0.50	0	0	2
Dalit Janajati Party	40,348	0.38	1	31,444	0.31	0	0	1
Nepa Rastriya Party	37,757	0.35	1	11,352	0.11	0	0	1
Samajbadi Prajatantrik Janata Party	35,752	0.33	1	13,246	0.13	0	0	1
Chure Bhawar Rastriya Ekta Party Nepal	28,575	0.27	1	18,908	0.18	0	0	1
Nepal Loktantrik Samajbadi Dal	25,022	0.23	1	10,432	0.10	0	0	1
Nepal Pariwar Dal	23,512	0.22	1				0	1
Communist Party of Nepal (Marxist)	21,234	0.20	0	1,759	0.02	0	0	0
Tamsaling Nepal Rastriya Dal	20,657	0.19	0	5,468	0.05	0	0	0
Rastriya Janata Dal	19,305	0.18	0	5,556	0.05	0	0	0
Communist Party of Nepal (United Marxist)	18,717	0.17	0	10,076	0.10	0	0	0
Lok Kalyankari Janta Party Nepal	18,123	0.17	0	6,700	0.07	0	0	0
Nepal Janabhavana Party	13,173	0.12	0	104	0.00	0	0	0
Rastriya Janata Dal Nepal	12,678	0.12	0	4,497	0.04	0	0	0
Nepal Janata Party	12,531	0.12	0	5,635	0.05	0	0	0
Mongol National Organisation	11,578	0.11	0	6,349	0.06	0	0	0
Nepal Shanti Kshetra Parishad	10,565	0.10	0	45	0.00	0	0	0
Shanti Party Nepal	10,511	0.10	0	970	0.01	0	0	0
Rastriya Bikas Party	9,329	0.09	0	2,612	0.03	0	0	0
Nepal Sukumbasi Party (Loktantrik)	8,322	0.08	0	1,459	0.01	0	0	0
Nepal Rastriya Bikas Party	8,026	0.07	0	1,603	0.02	0	0	0
Nepal Dalit Shramik Morcha	7,107	0.07	0	93	0.00	0	0	0
Samajbadi Party Nepal	6,564	0.06	0	1,197	0.01	0	0	0
Muskan Sena Nepal Party	6,292	0.06	0	2,490	0.02	0	0	0
Nepali Congress (Rastrabadi)	5,721	0.05	0				0	0
Nepal Samyabadi Dal	5,478	0.05	0	60	0.00	0	0	0
Nawa Janabadi Morcha	5,193	0.05	0	992	0.01	0	0	0
Hindu Prajatantrik Party	4,902	0.05	0	265	0.00	0	0	0
Nepal Samata Party	4,697	0.04	0	459	0.00	0	0	0
Rastrabadi Yuba Morcha	4,772	0.04	0	496	0.00	0	0	0
League Nepal Shanti Ekta Party	4,443	0.04	0	316	0.00	0	0	0
Rastrabadi Ekta Party	4,150	0.04	0	43	0.00	0	0	0
Sa-Shakti Nepal	3,752	0.03	0	532	0.01	0	0	0
Janamukti Party Nepal	3,396	0.03	0	281	0.00	0	0	0
Nepal Rastriya Loktantrik Dal	3,216	0.03	0	57	0.00	0	0	0
Nawa Nepal Prajatantrik Dal	3,016	0.03	0	34	0.00	0	0	0
Liberal Samajbadi Party				152	0.00	0	0	0
Nepal Rastriya Janakalayan Party				96	0.00	0	0	0
Independents				123,619	1.20	2	0	2
Total	10,739,078	100.00	335	10,306,120	100.00	240	26	601
Valid votes	10,739,078	96.34		10,306,120	94.85			
Invalid/blank votes	407,462	3.66		560,011	5.15			
Total votes	11,146,540	100.00		10,866,131	100.00			
Registered voters/turnout	17,611,832	63.29		17,611,832	61.70			

== History ==
=== Rana regime ===
In 1947, the government of prime minister Padma Shumsher formed a Constitution Reform Committee under the leadership of General Bahadur Shamsher to reform the administration in the country. The Nepal Government Constitutional Law, 1948 envisioned a bicameral legislature with the lower house called Rastra Sabha to have 42 elected members in addition to 28 members nominated by the prime minister. A provision was also included for an elected Village Panchayat with 5 to 15 members, an elected Municipal Panchayat with 10 to 50 members and an elected District Panchayat with 15 to 20 members. The elections for the bodies would be held on the basis of non-partisan democracy and all adults would have the right to franchise. The law was promulgated but never came into effect.

=== Transition era ===
The Interim Administration Act of Nepal, 1952 promulgated by King Tribhuvan after the end of the Rana regime made provisions an Election Commission for the first time. The act also gave everyone in the country over the age of 21 a right to adult franchise. The Constitution of the Kingdom of Nepal 1959, prepared under the advice of Sir Ivor Jennings created 109 constituencies in the country and reiterated the right to adult franchise for everyone over the age of 21.

=== Constitutional monarchy era ===
The constitution of 1990 had a provision for a bicameral parliament consisting of the House of Representatives (lower house) and the National Assembly (upper house). The country was divided into 205 constituencies which would elected members to the House of Representatives for a term of five years. The National Assembly had 60 members, 35 of whom would be elected by the electoral college of the House of Representatives, 3 each from the five development regions of Nepal, 15 in total, which would be elected by an electoral college of village, municipalities and districts and 10 members appointed by the monarch. The right to franchise was also extended to everyone over the age of 18.

=== Post Civil War ===
The Interim Constitution of Nepal, 2007, promulgated after 2006 revolution had provisions for a constituent assembly that would draft a new constitution for the newly formed republic. The country was divided into 240 constituencies which would elect members to the Constituent Assembly of Nepal. In addition to this 335 seats to the assembly were to be filled using a proportional representation system and a further 26 members would be appointed. The party list for the proportional voting had reservations for women, Dalits, Indigenous peoples, Madheshis and people from backward areas. Women would also have to make up one-third of the seats in the assembly.

=== Federal Democratic Republic of Nepal ===
The Constitution of Nepal, 2015 that was drafted by the 2nd Nepalese Constituent Assembly has provisions for a bicameral legislature. The House of Representatives and the National Assembly would be the lower chamber and the upper chamber of the new Federal Parliament of Nepal, respectively. The country was divided into 165 constituencies which would elect members to the House of Representatives through first-past-the-post voting and a further 110 members would be elected through the party list proportional representation system. The provincial assemblies were also created for each of the seven provinces of Nepal. The assemblies would be unicameral and would elect 330 members through first-past-the-post voting and 220 members would be elected through the party list proportional representation system. The National Assembly would elect 56 members through an electoral college consisting of members of the lower house, provincial assemblies and the heads and deputy heads of each of the 753 local units in the country.

== Election Commission ==
The Election Commission of Nepal is formed of five Election Commissioners, one of whom is Chief Election Commissioner and acts as the chairperson. They serve one term of six years and are appointed by the President on the recommendation of the Constitutional Council. The Chief Election Commissioners and other Election Commissioners must hold a bachelor's degree, must not belong to a political party immediately before their appointment, must have attained the age of forty-five and must possess high moral character.

The Election Commission conducts, supervises, directs and controls the elections for the President, Vice-president, Federal Parliament, State Legislature and local bodies. It prepares a voters' list for the purpose of the election and holds referendums on subjects of national importance as per the Constitution and Federal law.

== Legislative elections ==
Following the dissolution of parliament all the Members of Parliament forming the House of Representatives of the Federal Parliament of Nepal are elected. The term for the House of Representatives is five years, except when dissolved earlier. When the House of Representatives is dissolved the power of Federal Parliament is carried out by the National Assembly.

Candidates for each constituency seat are nominated by a political party or stand as independents. Each constituency elects one MP under the first past the post system of election. As well, since Nepal uses a parallel voting system, voters cast another ballot to try to elect MPs through the party-list proportional representation. The current constitution specifies that 165 MPs are elected from the first past the post system and 110 MPs are elected through the party-list proportional representation system. Women should account for one third of total members elected from each party and if at least a third are not elected in the district seats, the party shall have to elect enough women to make up a third of its total number of elected members, through the party-list proportional representation portion of the election.

A party with an overall majority (more seats than all other parties combined) following an election forms the government. If no party has an outright majority by itself, parties can seek to form a coalition that is made up of a majority of members in the chamber and can pass laws.

Year	Date	Elected members	Nominated members	Constituencies
1959 general election	18 February 1959	109	0	109
1971 general election	1971	109	16	109
1981 general election	9 May 1981	112	28	112
1986 general election	12 May 1986	112	28	112
1991 general election	12 May 1991	205	0	205
1994 general election	15 November 1994	205	0	205
1999 general election	3 & 17 May 1999	205	0	205
2008 Constituent Assembly election	10 April 2008	575	26	240
2013 Constituent Assembly election	19 November 2013	575	26	240
2017 general election	26 November and 7 December 2017	275	0	165
2022 general election	20 November 2022	275	0	165
2026 general election	5 March 2026	275	0	165

=== By-elections ===
- 1959 by-elections,
  - Constituency 52 (Bara Mid-East)
  - Constituency 70 (Thalara Doti North)
  - Constituency 91 (Gulmi South-West)
- 1992 by-elections, 9 February 1992
  - Sunsari 2
  - Kathmandu 5
- 1994 by-elections, 7 February 1994
  - Jhapa 1
  - Kathmandu 1
- 1997 by-elections, 24 January 1997
  - Sunsari 5
  - Kathmandu 1
  - Rautahat 2
  - Rupandehi 2
  - Baitadi 1
- 1999 by-elections, 9 December 1999
  - Jhapa 6
  - Morang 1
  - Rautahat 4
- 2009 by-elections, 10 April 2009
  - Morang 5
  - Morang 7
  - Dhanusha 5
  - Kaski 1
  - Rolpa 2
  - Kanchanpur 4
- 2014 by-elections, 22 June 2014
  - Kathmandu 2
  - Chitwan 4
  - Bardiya 1
  - Kailali 6
- Baglung 1, 11 April 2015
- Kaski 2, 30 November 2019
- 2023 by-elections, 23 April 2023
  - Bara 2
  - Chitwan 2
  - Tanahun 1
- Ilam 2, 27 April 2024

== National Assembly elections ==
According to Article 86 of the Constitution of Nepal 2015, the members of the National Assembly are elected every six years through an electoral college. In addition to this, one-third of the members are retired every two years for six years by drawing a lottery.

The electoral college consists of members of the provincial assembly and Chairperson/Mayor and Vice Chairperson/Deputy Mayor of the local bodies within the state. Each provincial assembly members vote has a weight of forty eight whereas each Chairperson/Mayor/Vice Chairperson/Deputy Mayor vote has a weight of eighteen. The electoral college elects 56 members to the National Assembly and three members, including one woman, are nominated by the president on the recommendation of the Government of Nepal.

Year	Date	Elected members	Nominated members
1959 Maha Sabha election	10 July 1959	18	18
1991 National Assembly election	26 June 1991	50	10
1993 National Assembly election	27 June 1993	17	3
1995 National Assembly election	13 November 1995	16	4
1997 National Assembly election	27 June 1997	17	3
1999 National Assembly election	10 July 1999	17	3
2001 National Assembly election	27 June 2001	16	3
2018 National Assembly election	7 February 2018	56	3
2020 National Assembly election	23 January 2020	18	1
2022 National Assembly election	26 January 2022	19	1
2024 National Assembly election	25 January 2024	18	1
2026 National Assembly election	25 January 2026	18	1

== Provincial assembly elections ==
Following the dissolution of the provincial assembly all the members forming the Provincial Assembly are elected. The term for the Provincial Assembly is five years, except when dissolved earlier.

Candidates for each constituency are chosen by the political parties or stand as independents. Each constituency elects one member under the first past the post system of election. Since Nepal uses a parallel voting system, voters cast another ballot to elect members through the party-list proportional representation. The current constitution specifies that sixty percent of the members should be elected from the first past the post system and forty percent through the party-list proportional representation system. Women should account for one third of total members elected from each party and if one-third percentage are not elected, the party that fails to ensure so shall have to elect one-third of total number as women through the party-list proportional representation.

A party with an overall majority (more seats than all other parties combined) following an election forms the government. If a party has no outright majority, parties can seek to form coalitions.

The first provincial assembly elections in Nepal were held on 26 November and 7 December 2017.

Year	Date	Elected members	Nominated members	Constituencies
2017 provincial elections	26 November and 7 December 2017	550	0	330
2022 provincial elections	20 November 2022	550	0	330

=== By-election ===
- 2019 by-elections, 30 November 2019
  - Bhaktapur 1 (A), Bagmati
  - Baglung 2 (B), Gandaki
  - Dang 3 (B), Lumbini
- Bajhang 1 (A), Sudurpashchim, 27 April 2024

== Local elections ==
Elections are held for the municipal executive and municipal assemblies in municipalities and for the village executive and village assemblies in rural municipalities. The local executive consists of the elected mayor (or chair in rural municipalities), the deputy mayor (or the deputy chair in rural municipalities) and ward chairs of every ward in the local unit elected through first-past-the-post voting and, five female members (four in rural municipalities) and three members of the Dalit or minority community (two in rural municipalities) elected by the local assembly through single non-transferable vote. The assembly consists of the mayor (chair in the case of village assemblies), the deputy mayor (deputy chair in village assemblies), ward chais and four members from each ward of the municipality or rural municipality. Two ward members must be female, one of whom must belong to the dalit community or a minority group. All elections to the village assembly are held on the basis of first past the post system.

Year	Date
1983 local panchayat elections	
1987 local panchayat elections	
1992 local elections	28 and 31 May 1992
1997 local elections	17 and 26 May 1997
2006 municipal elections	8 February 2006
2017 local elections	14 May, 28 June and 18 September 2017
2022 local elections	13 May 2022

== Referendums ==
There has been one referendum held in Nepal, The 1980 governmental system referendum of 2 May 1980.

== See also ==
- Censorship in Nepal
- Electoral calendar
- Electoral system
- Electoral roll
- Election commission
