= List of political parties in Nepal =

Nepal has a multi-party democracy, and the Election Commission of Nepal grants recognition to national-level and Province-level political parties based on objective criteria. A recognised political party enjoys privileges. The ECN periodically reviews the recognized party status. Only registered parties will be eligible to participate in the proportional electoral system.

== History ==
Nepal's political party system evolved from clandestine movements against autocratic rule, such as the Nepal Praja Parishad (1936), to the establishment of Nepali Congress in 1947. The 1990 Jana Andolan restored multiparty democracy, and the 2006 movement led to the abolition of the monarchy, establishing a federal democratic republic. Communist parties, including the Maoist insurgents, have played a significant role in shaping modern Nepalese politics.

=== Legal framework ===
Political parties in Nepal are registered under the Political Parties Act, 2058 (2002) and the Political Party Registration Rules, 2063 (2007). Registration requires submission of statutes, manifesto, flag, election symbol, and signatures from at least 10,000 voters. Parties must hold internal elections, ensure inclusivity, and comply with democratic principles to maintain registration.

=== Current landscape ===
As of 2025, the Election Commission has registered 137 parties, reflecting a highly fragmented political system. Governance is dominated by a few major parties, but smaller and regional parties influence coalition-building and local governance. Ideologically, Nepalese parties range from far-left Marxist-Leninist and Maoist groups to centrist social democrats and right-wing monarchist factions, with frequent mergers and splits shaping the political dynamics.

Nepal’s multi-party system continues to evolve, balancing national representation with regional and ethnic interests, making it a complex but vibrant democratic landscape.

== National parties ==
A party registered with the Election Commission of Nepal is recognised as a national party only if it fulfils the two conditions listed below:

- The party needs to win at least one FPTP seat in House of Representatives.
- The party gets at least 3% of the total valid proportional representation (PR) votes in House of Representatives.

There are currently six national parties in Nepal.

Party	Abbr.	Founded	Political position	Ideology	Leader	Federal Parliament		Provincial Assemblies							Local government	
Party	Abbr.	Founded	Political position	Ideology	Leader	Pratinidhi Sabha	Rastriya Sabha	Koshi	Madhesh	Bagmati	Gandaki	Lumbini	Karnali	Sudurpashchim	Heads	Councillors
Rastriya Swatantra Party (National Independent Party) राष्ट्रिय स्वतन्त्र पार्टी	RSP	2022	Centre	Economic liberalism Progressivism; Constitutional socialism	Rabi Lamichhane	182 / 275	—N/a	—N/a	—N/a	—N/a	—N/a	—N/a	—N/a	—N/a	1 / 753	12 / 35,097
Nepali Congress नेपाली काँग्रेस	Congress	1950	Centre to centre-left	Social democracy Democratic socialism	Gagan Thapa	38 / 275	24 / 59	29 / 93	22 / 107	37 / 110	27 / 60	27 / 87	15 / 40	18 / 53	331 / 753	13,773 / 35,097
Communist Party of Nepal (Unified Marxist–Leninist) नेपाल कम्युनिष्ट पार्टी (एमाले)	CPN-UML	1991	Centre-left to left-wing	Communism; Marxism–Leninism; People's Multiparty; Democracy	K. P. Sharma Oli	25 / 275	11 / 59	40 / 93	23 / 107	27 / 110	22 / 60	33 / 87	10 / 40	10 / 53	205 / 753	11,929 / 35,097
Nepali Communist Party नेपाली कम्युनिष्ट पार्टी	NCP	2025	Left-wing	Communism; Marxism–Leninism	Pushpa Kamal Dahal	17 / 275	17 / 59	17 / 93	17 / 107	28 / 110	8 / 60	10 / 87	14 / 40	30 / 53	150 / 753	6,131 / 35,097
Shram Sanskriti Party (Labor Culture Party) श्रम संस्कृति पार्टी	SSP	2025		Agrarianism; Grassroots democracy	Harka Sampang	7 / 275	—N/a	—N/a	—N/a	—N/a	—N/a	—N/a	—N/a	—N/a	—N/a	—N/a
Rastriya Prajatantra Party (National Democratic Party) राष्ट्रिय प्रजातन्त्र पार्टी	RPP	1990	Centre-right to right-wing	Constitutional monarchism Economic liberalism Hindutva	Rajendra Prasad Lingden	5 / 275	—N/a	5 / 93	1 / 107	13 / 110	2 / 60	4 / 87	1 / 40	1 / 53	4 / 753	305 / 35,097

== Other parties currently represented in the Federal parliament ==
A political party securing less than 3% of the PR votes will have to send its directly elected or FPTP candidates to the parliament as independent lawmakers. In other words, candidates from any political party failing to meet the criteria to become a national party will be ineligible to be represented in parliament as a party.

There are currently two such political parties which failed to achieve national status yet are represented in Nepal's Parliament.

Party	Founded	Political position	Ideology	Leader	Federal Parliament		Provincial Assemblies		Local government	
Party	Founded	Political position	Ideology	Leader	Pratinidhi Sabha	Rastriya Sabha	Madhesh	Lumbini	Heads	Councillors
People's Socialist Party, Nepal जनता समाजवादी पार्टी, नेपाल	2020	Centre-left to left-wing	Democratic socialism Minority rights	Upendra Yadav	—N/a	3 / 59	28 / 107	4 / 87	43 / 753	1,885 / 35,097
Rastriya Janamorcha (National People's Front) राष्ट्रिय जनमोर्चा	2006	Far-left	Communism; Marxism–Leninism; Anti-federalism	Chitra Bahadur K.C.	—N/a	1 / 59	—N/a	1 / 87	4 / 753	159 / 35,097

== Parties currently represented only in provincial assemblies ==
Party	Founded	Political position	Leader	Provincial Assemblies		Local government		
Party	Founded	Political position	Leader	Provincial Assemblies		Head	Councillors	Local councils
Janamat Party (Public Opinion Party) जनमत पार्टी	2019	Centre-left	CK Raut	Madhesh	13 / 107	—N/a	96 / 35,097	2 / 753
Janamat Party (Public Opinion Party) जनमत पार्टी	2019	Centre-left	CK Raut	Lumbini	3 / 87	—N/a	96 / 35,097	2 / 753
People's Socialist Party जनता समाजवादी पार्टी	2024	Centre-left to left-wing	Ashok Rai	Madhesh	1 / 93	—N/a	248 / 35,097	5 / 753
People's Socialist Party जनता समाजवादी पार्टी	2024	Centre-left to left-wing	Ashok Rai	Lumbini	2 / 87	—N/a	248 / 35,097	5 / 753
Nepal Majdoor Kisan Party (Nepal Workers Peasants Party) नेपाल मजदुर किसान पार्टी	1975	Far-left	Narayan Man Bijukchhe	Bagmati	3 / 110	—N/a	85 / 35,097	1 / 753
Desh Bikash Party (Country Development Party) देश विकास पार्टी	2022	Big tent	Ananta Raj Ghimire	Bagmati	2 / 110	—N/a	—N/a	—N/a
Nepal Federal Socialist Party नेपाल संघीय समाजवादी पार्टी	2016	Centre-left	Mohammad Rizwan Ansari	Madhesh	1 / 107	—N/a	—N/a	—N/a
Pragatisheel Loktantrik Party (Progressive Democratic Party) प्रगतिशील लोकतान्त्रिक पार्टी	2025	Left wing	Baburam Bhattarai	Gandaki	1 / 60	—N/a	—N/a	—N/a

== Parties represented only in local government ==
Party	Political position	Leader	Local government		
Party	Political position	Leader	Head	Councillors	Local councils
Aam Janata Party (Common People's Party) आम जनता पार्टी	Far-left	Prabhu Sah	1 / 753	—N/a	—N/a
Nepal Janata Party (Nepal People's Party) नेपाल जनता पार्टी	Right-wing	Tribhuvan Nath Pathak	—N/a	10 / 35,097	Kamala; Kotahimai
Sanghiya Loktantrik Rastriya Manch (Federal Democratic National Front) संघीय लोकतान्त्रिक राष्ट्रिय मञ्च	Centre-left	Kumar Lingden	—N/a	9 / 35,097	Chulachuli; Kankai; Pathibhara Yanwarak; Sidingba
Nepali Congress (B.P.) नेपाली कांग्रेस (बि.पी.)	Centre-left	Sushil Man Sherchan	—N/a	7 / 35,097	Amargadhi; Ganyapadhura
Nepal Loktantrik Party (Nepal Democratic Party) नेपाल लोकतान्त्रिक पार्टी	Centre-left	Bhanuram Dagaura Tharu	—N/a	7 / 35,097	Kalaiya; Lamkichuha
Rastriya Janamukti Party (National People's Liberation Party) राष्ट्रिय जनमुक्ति पार्टी	Centre-left	Khadak Prasad Palungwa	—N/a	7 / 35,097	Butwal; Kaligandaki; Mangsebung
Bahujan Shakti Party (Bahujan Power Party) बहुजन शक्ति पार्टी	Centre-left	Biswendra Paswan	—N/a	6 / 35,097	Krishnanagar; Lakshminiya
Bahujan Ekata Party Nepal (Bahujan Unity Party Nepal) बहुजन एकता पार्टी नेपाल	Left-wing	Harinandan Kumar Ranjan	—N/a	5 / 35,097	Barahathawa
Nepal Sushashan Party (Nepal Good Governance Party) नेपाल सुशासन पार्टी		Ramesh Kharel	—N/a	4 / 35,097	Pokhariya
Nepal Sadbhawana Party (Nepal Goodwill Party) नेपाल सद्भावना पार्टी		Anil Kumar Jha	—N/a	1 / 35,097	Chhinnamasta

== Other parties ==
Party	Political position	Founded	Leader			
Party			Pragatisheel Loktantrik Party (Progressive Democratic Party) प्रगतिशील लोकतान्त्रिक पार्टी	Left-wing	2025	Baburam Bhattarai
Ujyaalo Nepal Party	Centre-left	2025	Kulman Ghising			
Rastriya Pariwartan Party		2025	Rajesh Portel			
Janadesh Party		2025	Raman Kumar Karna			
Nagrik Unmukti Party, Nepal		2025	Resham Lal Chaudhary			
Rastriya Mukti Party Nepal		2025	Rajendra Mahato			
CPN (Maoist)		2014	Netra Bikram Chand			
Mongol National Organisation		1989	Gopal Gurung			
Nepal Pariwar Dal	Centre-right		Ek Nath Dhakal			
Communist Party of Nepal (Marxist–Leninist)	Left-wing		Chandra Prakash Mainali			
Shree Mahendra Dal(Shreemad), Nepal			Sushil K. Bisht			
Khambuwan Rashtriya Morcha, Nepal			Ram Kumar Rai			
Bouddhik Prajatantrik Parishad			Laxman Rajbanshi			
Jana Jagaran Party Nepal			Lokmani Dhakal			
Samajvadi Janata Party	Centre-left		Prem Bahadur Singh			
Sanghiya Loktantrik Rastriya Manch (Tharuhat)			Rukmini Chaudhary			
Madhesh Terai Forum			Amar Yadav			
Nepal Communist Party (Marxist)	Far-left		Prakash Adhikari			
Communist Party of Nepal	Far-left		Rishi Ram Kattel			
Communist Party of Nepal	Madhesi Janaadhikar Forum Madhesh		Bhagya Nath Gupta			
Communist Party of Nepal (Marxist–Leninist-Socialist)	Far-left		Bishnu Raj Aryal			
Shiva Sena Nepal	Right-wing to far-right		Arun Subedi			
Nepal Sukumbasi Party (Loktantrik)			Hukum Bahadur Lama			
Bahujan Samaj Party Nepal	Centre-left		Ganga Prasad Mahara			
Deshbhakta Paryabaraniya Samajik Morcha	Centre		Surendra Prasad Dhakal			
Rastrabadi Ekta Party			Uma Shrestha			
Tamangsaling Loktantrik Party						
Lok Dal			Kaushal Kumar Singh			
Deshbhakta Samaj						
Janashakti Nepal			Ram Kumar Ojha			
Miteri Party Nepal						
Rastriya Shiva Sena Party	Right-wing		Bikram Bahadur Bam			
Akhanda Sudurpashchim Party Nepal			Khagendra Awasthi			
Nepal Prajatantrik Pragatisheel Party						
Pichhadabarga Nishad Dalit Janajati Party						
Janasamajvadi Party, Nepal	Centre-left					
Churebhawar Loktantrik Party			Bhumiraj Niraula			
Rastriya Churebhavar Party			Shiva Prasad Tamang			
Chure Bhawar Rastriya Party			Keshav Prasad Mainali			
Chure Bhawar Rastriya Ekta Party Nepal			Badri Neupane			
Rastriya Janata Dal Nepal			Bharat Prasad Mahato			
Lok Kalyankari Janata Party, Nepal						
Nepal Samajbadi Party (Lohiyabadi)	Centre-left					
Gandhivadi Party Nepal						
Rastravadi Party						
Nepal Purvarastrasevak Loktantrik Party						
Nepal Janaloktantrik Party						
Nepal People's Party						
Rastriya Jana Ekta Party						
Hamro Party						
Nepal Dalit Party						
Hamro Party Nepal						
Yuva Nepal Party						
Nepal Loktantrik Janata Congress Party						
Nepal Samajwadi Janata Dal	Left-wing					
Nepal Bahudal Party			Ambika Rana			
Prajatantrik Shakti Party	Centre-right		Ganesh Bahadur Shrestha			
Nepali Jantantra Party						
People's Progressive Party	Centre-left		Jukti Jung Lamichhane			
Unnat Loktantra Party	N/A		Swagat Nepal			

== Defunct parties ==
This is a list of defunct political parties of Nepal that have had some representation in the legislature.

Party	Founded	Defunct
Nepal Rashtrabadi Gorkha Parishad	1951	Unknown
Communist Party of Nepal	1949	1962
Nepal Praja Parishad	1951	1961
Samyukta Prajatantra Party	1955	Unknown
Communist Party of Nepal (Democratic)	1979	1991
Samyukta Janamorcha Nepal	1991	2002
Communist Party of Nepal (United)	1991	2005
Communist Party of Nepal (Maoist Centre)	1994	2025
Rastriya Prajatantra Party (Chand)	1997	1998
Communist Party of Nepal (Marxist–Leninist)	1998	2002
Nepali Congress (Democratic)	2002	2007
Janamorcha Nepal	2002	2009
Nepal Sadbhavana Party (Anandidevi)	2003	2015
Communist Party of Nepal (Unified)	2007	2013
Rastriya Janashakti Party	2007	2013
Madheshi Jana Adhikar Forum, Nepal	2007	2015
Sadbhavana Party	2007	2017
Terai Madhesh Loktantrik Party	2007	2017
Madheshi Jana Adhikar Forum, Nepal (Loktantrik)	2009	2017
Communist Party of Nepal Marxist−Leninist (Samajbadi)	2010	2013
Terai Madhesh Loktantrik Party Nepal	2010	2013
Madheshi Jana Adhikar Forum (Republican)	2011	2017
Federal Socialist Party, Nepal	2012	2015
Rastriya Madhesh Samajbadi Party	2013	2017
Terai Madhesh Sadbhavana Party	2013	2017
Federal Socialist Forum, Nepal	2015	2019
Naya Shakti Party, Nepal	2016	2019
Rastriya Janata Party Nepal	2016	2019
Nepal Loktantrik Forum	2017	2017
Bibeksheel Sajha Party	2017	2025
Rastriya Janata Party Nepal	2017	2020
Rastriya Prajatantra Party (Democratic)	2017	2020
Nepal Communist Party	2018	2021
Samajbadi Party, Nepal	2019	2020
Rastriya Sadbhavana Party	Unknown	2013
Akhanda Nepal Party	Unknown	2017
Sanghiya Sadbhavana Party	Unknown	2017
Samajbadi Janata Party	Unknown	Unknown
Loktantrik Samajwadi Party, Nepal	2021	2025

== See also ==
- Politics of Nepal
- List of communist parties in Nepal
- List of regional and ethnicity based parties in Nepal
