= List of regional and ethnicity based parties in Nepal =

A number of political parties in Nepal strive to provide ethnic group(s) with better living conditions within the country, counter discrimination, or some sort of autonomy for various regions or ethnic groups. The following is a list of those parties with this explicitly stated goal.

== Ethnicity ==
=== All minority ethnicity ===
- Loktantrik Samajwadi Party, Nepal
- People's Socialist Party, Nepal

=== Madhesi ===
- Madhesi Janadhikar Forum Madhesh
- Terai Madhesh Loktantrik Party
- Janamat Party
- Nepali Janata Dal

=== Tharu ===
- Nagrik Unmukti Party
- Tharuhat Tarai Party Nepal

=== Dalits ===
- Bahujan Samaj Party Nepal
- Bahujan Shakti Party, Nepal
- Dalit Janajati Party
- Nepal Dalit Shramik Morcha

=== Janajati ===
- Dalit Janajati Party
- Shram Sanskriti Party
- Federal Limbuwan State Council
- Federal Socialist Party, Nepal
- Khambuwan Rashtriya Morcha Nepal
- Mongol National Organisation
- Nepa Rastriya Party
- Prajatantrik Janamukti Party
- Rastriya Janamukti Party
- Sanghiya Loktantrik Rastriya Manch
- Tamsaling Nepal Rastriya Dal

== Geographical area ==
- Chure Bhawar Rastriya Ekta Party Nepal – Churia Hills

== Landless and squatters ==
- Nepal Sukumbasi Party (Loktantrik)

== Religion ==
=== Hinduism ===
- Rastriya Prajatantra Party
- Hindu Prajatantrik Party
- Nepal Janata Party
- Shanti Party Nepal
- Shiva Sena Nepal

=== Christian ===
- Nepal Pariwar Dal

== See also ==
- List of political parties in Nepal
