= Ananda Prasad Dhungana =

Nepali politician

Honourable Ananda Prasad Dhungana
- आनन्द प्रसाद ढुँगाना
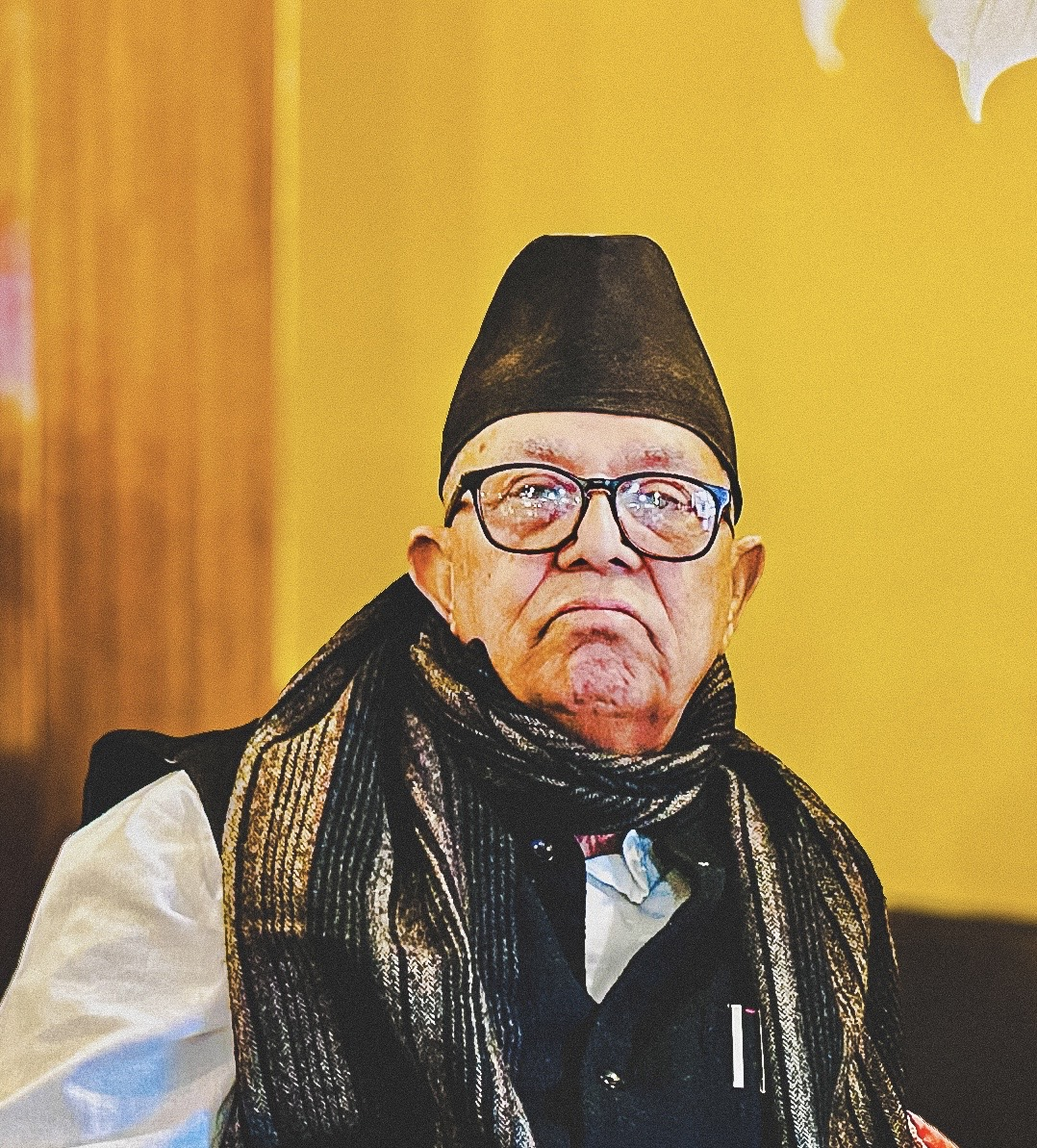

Member of the National Assembly of Nepal
- Incumbent
- Assumed office 4 March 2024
- President: Ram Chandra Poudel
- Category: Open
- Class: III
- Preceded by: Jitendra Dev
- Constituency: Madhesh Province

Member of the Legislature Parliament
- In office 21 January 2014 – 14 October 2017
- PR group: Khas Arya (Open)
- Constituency: Nepali Congress PR list

Minister for Forests and Soil Conservation
- In office 26 August 1998 – 23 December 1998
- Prime Minister: Girija Prasad Koirala
- Preceded by: Siddha Raj Ojha
- Succeeded by: Mahantha Thakur

Minister for Tourism and Civil Aviation
- In office 21 April 1998 – 26 August 1998
- Prime Minister: Girija Prasad Koirala
- Preceded by: Salim Miya Ansari
- Succeeded by: Yam Lal Kandel

Minister for Supplies
- In office 5 May 1998 – 26 August 1998
- Prime Minister: Girija Prasad Koirala
- Preceded by: Khum Bahadur Khadka
- Succeeded by: Khum Bahadur Khadka

Member of Parliament, Pratinidhi Sabha
- In office 15 January 2007 – 18 January 2008
- Prime Minister: Girija Prasad Koirala
- Constituency: Dhanusha 3
- In office 31 May 1999 – 21 May 2002
- Prime Minister: Krishna Prasad Bhattarai, Girija Prasad Koirala, Sher Bahadur Deuba
- Preceded by: himself
- Succeeded by: Satrudhan Mahato (as Member of the Constituent Assembly)
- Constituency: Dhanusha 3

Member of House of Representatives
- In office 14 December 1994 – 15 January 1999
- Prime Minister: Girija Prasad Koirala
- Preceded by: himself
- Succeeded by: himself
- Constituency: Dhanusha 3
- In office 20 June 1991 – 11 July 1994
- Prime Minister: Girija Prasad Koirala
- Preceded by: Constituency established
- Succeeded by: himself
- Constituency: Dhanusha 3

Personal details
- Born: 28 October 1950 (age 75) Dhanushadham, Dhanusa, Nepal
- Party: Nepali Congress
- Spouse: Padhma Dhungana
- Parents: Thakur Prasad Dhungana (father); Suwarnalata Devi Dhungana (mother)
- Education: Tribhuvan University

Anand Prasad Dhungana (Nepali: आनन्द प्रसाद ढुँगाना) is a Nepali politician affiliated with the Nepali Congress. He is a member of the National Assembly of Nepal representing Madhesh Province and a former member of the House of Representatives. Dhungana previously served as a member of the 2nd Constituent Assembly and as a central committee member of the Nepali Congress. He has held several ministerial portfolios, including Minister for Tourism and Civil Aviation, Minister for Supplies, and Minister for Forests and Soil Conservation in the Second Girija Prasad Koirala cabinet in 1998.

== Electoral history ==
Dhungana remained victorious in the 1990, 1994, and 1999 elections. He defeated two former deputy PMs, Raghubir Mahasheth and Ishwor Pokhrel in 1990 and 1999, respectively. In 2017, he was defeated as Deepak Karki of the Nepali Congress joined FSF-N and ran as a candidate.

=== 2017 legislative elections ===
Party	Candidate	Votes
CPN (Maoist Centre)	Matrika Prasad Yadav	26,418
Federal Socialist Forum, Nepal	Deepak Karki	17,296
Nepali Congress	Ananda Prasad Dhungana	15,679
Independent	Manoj Malla Thakuri	3,492
Others		1,812
Invalid votes		4,471
Result	Maoist Centre gain	
Source: Election Commission

==== 2008 Constituent Assembly election - Dhanusha - 7(abolished 2017) ====
Candidate	Party	Votes	%
Satrudhan Mahato	Communist Party of Nepal (UML)	11,620	30.06
Ananda Prasad Dhungana	Nepali Congress	7,469	19.32
Jageshwor Mahato Koiree	Communist Party of Nepal (Maoists)	4,402	11.39
Megh Bahadur Thapa	Chure Bhawar Rastriya Ekta Party Nepal	3,384	8.75
Rajendra Prasad Singh	Sadbhavana Party	3,267	8.45
Ram Kumar Mahato	Janamorcha Nepal	2,218	5.74
Chandeshwor Mahato	Madheshi Jana Adhikar Forum, Nepal	1,306	3.38
Hem Bahadur Malla	Rastriya Prajatantra Party Nepal	1,126	2.91
Tek Bahadur Lama	Tarai Madhes Loktantrik Party	829	2.14
Mahendra Yadav	Communist Party of Nepal (United)	580	1.50
Prem Bahadur Bishwokarma	Dalit Janajati Party	557	1.44
Hima Timilsena	Nepali Janata Dal	487	1.26
Kapaleshwor Mahato	Lok Kalyankari Janata Party Nepal	323	0.84
Ramdayal Raut	Communist Party of Nepal (United Marxist)	202	0.52
Jogendra Mahato	Independent	165	0.43
Manoj Kumar Mahato	Nepal Sadbhavana Party (Anandidevi)	155	0.40
Jagatnath Tamang	Independent	147	0.38
Bhola Mahato Koiree	Rastriya Janshakti Party	138	0.36
Prem Bahadur Pakhrin	Independent	76	0.20
Devraj Upadhyaya Ghimire	Rastriya Bikas Party	68	0.18
Arjun Lama	Nepal Samata Party	62	0.16
Devnarayan Mahato Koiree	Independent	38	0.10
Manoj Kumar Mahato	Independent	21	0.05
Ramparikshan Mahato	Independent	18	0.05
Total		38,658	100.00
Majority		4,151	
CPN (UML) gain			

=== Election in the 1990s ===
==== 1999 legislative elections ====
Party	Candidate	Votes
Nepali Congress	Ananda Prasad Dhungana	15,026
Rastriya Prajatantra Party (Chand)	Hem Bahadur Malla	13,736
CPN (Unified Marxist–Leninist)	Anand Yadav	10,256
CPN (Marxist–Leninist)	Raghubir Mahaseth	9,974
Others		3,272
Invalid Votes		1,301
Result	Congress hold	
Source: Election Commission

==== 1994 legislative elections ====
Party	Candidate	Votes
Nepali Congress	Ananda Prasad Dhungana	17,429
CPN (Unified Marxist–Leninist)	Bhola Prasad Shah	15,133
Rastriya Prajatantra Party	Hem Bahadur Malla	12,937
Samyukta Jana Morcha Nepal	Dinesh Bharati	1,008
Others		1,886
Result	Congress hold	
Source: Election Commission

==== 1991 legislative elections ====
Party	Candidate	Votes
Nepali Congress	Ananda Prasad Dhungana	20,877
CPN (Unified Marxist–Leninist)	Ishwar Pokhrel	14,311
Result	Congress gain	

== See also ==
- Bimalendra Nidhi
- 2022 Janakpur municipal election
- Ram Krishna Yadav
- Mahendra Yadav
