= Rashtrabadi Milan Kendra Nepal Dal =

Rashtrabadi Milan Kendra Nepal Dal राष्ट्रवादी मिलन केन्द्र नेपाल दल
- President: Ganesh Bahadur Pande

Election symbol

Rashtrabadi Milan Kendra Nepal Dal is a political party in Nepal. The party is registered with the Election Commission of Nepal ahead of the 2008 Constituent Assembly Election.
