= Prasain =

Prasain or Prasai (Nepali: प्रसाईं) is a surname belonging to the Khas people of both the Brahmin and Chhetri caste from Nepal.

Notable people with the surname Prasain include:

- Deepika Prasain, Nepalese movie and theater actress
- Ganga Prasad Prasain, Indian politician
- Bishnu Prasad Prasain, Nepali politician
- Khanuparude (Rambabu Prasai), Nepali politician
- Nanda Kumar Prasai, Nepali politician
- Durga Prasai , Nepali businessman
