= Nepal Janasangh Party =

Nepal Janasangh Party नेपाल जनसंघ पार्टी
- President: Padam Bahadur Sapkota

Election symbol

Nepal Janasangh Party is a royalist political party in Nepal. The party is registered with the Election Commission of Nepal ahead of the 2008 Constituent Assembly election.
