= Nepal Jagriti Dal =

Nepal Jagriti Dal नेपाल जागृति दल
- President: Sommaya Tamang

Election symbol

Nepal Jagriti Dal is a political party in Nepal. The party is registered with the Election Commission of Nepal ahead of the 2008 Constituent Assembly election.
