= Loktantrik Janata Party, Nepal =

Loktantrik Janata Party, Nepal लोकतान्त्रिक जनता पार्टी, नेपाल
- President: Dr. Yogendra Thakur

Election symbol

Loktantrik Janata Party, Nepal is a political party in Nepal. The party is registered with the Election Commission of Nepal ahead of the 2008 Constituent Assembly election.
