= Prajatantrik Shanti Party =

Prajatantrik Shanti Party प्रजातान्त्रिक शान्ति पार्टी
- President: Hemraj Adhikari

Election symbol

Prajatantrik Shanti Party is a political party in Nepal. The party was registered with the Election Commission of Nepal ahead of the 2008 Constituent Assembly election.
