= Prajatantrik Shakti Party =

Prajatantrik Shakti Party प्रजातान्त्रिक शक्ति पार्टी
- President: Ganesh Bahadur Shrestha
- Ideology: Constitutionalism; Monarchism

Election symbol

Prajatantrik Shakti Party is a political party in Nepal. The party is registered with the Election Commission of Nepal ahead of the 2008 Constituent Assembly election. The party supports a constitutional monarchy.
