= Samajbadi Party, Nepal =

Samajbadi Party, Nepal (transl. Socialist Party, Nepal) may refer to:

- Samajbadi Party Nepal, estb. 2008 by Salim Miya Ansari
- Samajbadi Party, Nepal (2019), from the merger of 'Federal Socialist Forum' of Upendra Yadav, and the 'Naya Shakti Party' of Baburam Bhattarai
- Samajbadi Janata Party or Samajbadi Prajatantrik Janata Party Nepal, defunct
- Communist Party of Nepal (Unified Socialist), splinter party of Communist Party of Nepal (Unified Marxist–Leninist) commonly referred to as Unified Socialist, Socialist Party or Samajbadi Party
- Nepal Socialist Party, led by Baburam Bhattarai

== See also ==
- Nepal Socialist Party (disambiguation)
