= Nepal Prajatantrik Yuba Party =

Nepal Prajatantrik Yuba Party नेपाल प्रजातान्त्रिक युवा पार्टी
- President: Lakshman Paudel

Election symbol

Nepal Prajatantrik Yuba Party is a political party in Nepal. The party is registered with the Election Commission of Nepal ahead of the 2008 Constituent Assembly election.
