= Rastriya Jana Prajatantrik Party =

Rastriya Jana Prajatantrik Party राष्ट्रिय जन प्रजातान्त्रिक पार्टी
- President: Kameshwarsingh Subedi

Election symbol

Rastriya Jana Prajatantrik Party is a political party in Nepal. The party is registered with the Election Commission of Nepal ahead of the 2008 Constituent Assembly election.
