= NJD =

NJD or njd may refer to:

- New Jersey Devils, a professional ice hockey team based in Newark, New Jersey
- njd, the ISO 639-3 code for Ndonde Hamba language
- Nepali Janata Dal, a political party in Nepal
