= Samyukta Samabeshi Morcha =

Samyukta Samabeshi Morcha (Nepali: संयुक्त समावेशी मोर्चा) is a coalition of political parties formed ahead of the 2008 Constituent Assembly election in Nepal. The coalition comprises the Rastriya Janshakti Party, Nepali Rastriya Janabhavana Party, Rastriya Janamukti Party and Rastriya Jana Ekta Party.

The front has presented a 13-point platform. RJP chair and former prime minister Surya Bahadur Thapa is the convenor of the front. RJP vice-chairman Prakash Chandra Lohani initially claimed that the Dalit Janajati Party was one of the constituents of the front, but the DJP has denied membership in the alliance.
