= Hariyali Nepal Party =

Hariyali Nepal Party हरियाली नेपाल पार्टी
- President: Kuber Sharma
- Founded: 1996
- Ideology: Green politics
- Regional affiliation: Asia Pacific Greens Federation (Associate)
- International affiliation: Global Greens (Associate)

Election symbol

Website
- nepalgreenparty.com

Hariyali Nepal Party (Green Nepal Party) is a political party in Nepal. The party is registered with the Election Commission of Nepal ahead of the 2008 Constituent Assembly election. It was established in 1997 and is a member of the Global Greens and the Asia-Pacific Green Network.

Kuber Sharma, the party's founding president, briefly held the post of Nepal's Minister for Culture and Civil Aviation in November 2004. Another notable founding member is Maita Lal Gurung.

== History ==
The party was, according to its chairman Sharma, founded by persons previously associated with various political ideals.

The party got 6638 votes in the 1999 legislative election, but no seat.

The chairman of the party, Kuber Sharma, was named Culture, Tourism and Civil Aviation minister by King Gyanendra in 2002.
