= Prem Bahadur Singh =

Nepali politician

- प्रेम बहादुर सिंह
- Incumbent
- Assumed office 1999
- Constituency: Kalikot-1

Personal details
- Party: CPN (UML)
- Other political affiliations: Samajbadi Janata Party
- Website: https://prembahadursingh.com.np/

Prem Bahadur Singh (Nepali: प्रेम बहादुर सिंह) is a Nepalese politician. He is the chairman of the Samajbadi Prajatantrik Janata Party, Nepal. He was previously a political leader of the Communist Party of Nepal (Unified Marxist-Leninist).

Singh won the Kalikot-1 seat in the 1999 parliamentary election as a CPN(UML) candidate. Singh got 10813 votes, defeating the Nepali Congress candidate Netra Bahadur Shahi. After the 2008 Constituent Assembly election, in which SPJPN won one Proportional Representation seat, Singh was selected to represent the party in the 1st Nepalese Constituent Assembly.

On July 3, 2009, Singh was appointed Minister for Law and Justice.

He was Minister for Water Supply and Sanitation until he resigned from his post in July 2016. He was sworn in for the same post in January 2017, again. He was the only member of his party in the parliament.
