= Nepali Rastriya Janabhavana Party =

Nepali Rastriya Janabhavana Party नेपाली राष्ट्रिय जनभावना पार्टी
- President: Bhim Bahadur Tamang

Election symbol

Nepali Rastriya Janabhavana Party is a political party in Nepal. The party is registered with the Election Commission of Nepal ahead of the 2008 Constituent Assembly election.

The party forms part of the Samyukta Samabeshi Morcha.
