= Nepal Bahudal Party =

Nepal Bahudal Party नेपाल बहुदल पार्टी
- President: Ambika Rana

Election symbol

Nepal Bahudal Party is a political party in Nepal. The party is registered with the Election Commission of Nepal ahead of the 2008 Constituent Assembly election.
