= Nepali Jantantra Party =

Nepali Jantantra Party नेपाली जनतन्त्र पार्टी
- President: Shyam Prasad Lama

Election symbol

Nepali Jantantra Party is a political party in Nepal. The party is registered with the Election Commission of Nepal ahead of the 2008 Constituent Assembly election.
