= NJP =

NJP may refer to:

- National Justice Party (United States), a former antisemitic white supremacist political organization in the United States
- New Jalpaiguri railway station, India, station code
- New Journal of Physics, scientific journal
- non-judicial punishment, US armed forces
- Nepal Janata Party, a political party in Nepal
