= Laxmilal Chaudhary =

Nepali politician

Personal details
- Party: Nepal Loktantrik Samajbadi Dal

Laxmilal Chaudhary is a Nepalese politician, belonging to the Nepal Loktantrik Samajbadi Dal. After the 2008 Constituent Assembly election, in which NLSD won one Proportional Representation seat, Chaudhary was selected to represent the party in the 1st Nepalese Constituent Assembly. Chaudhary stood as a representative for the Saptari District.
