= Nepal Shanti Kshetra Parishad =

Nepal Shanti Kshetra Parishad नेपाल शान्ति क्षेत्र परिषद्
- President: Shushma Badal Sharma

Election symbol

Nepal Shanti Kshetra Parishad is a political party in Nepal. The party was registered with the Election Commission of Nepal ahead of the 2008 Constituent Assembly election.
