= Janamukti Party Nepal =

Janamukti Party Nepal जनमुक्ति पार्टी नेपाल
- President: Atalman Rai
- Secretary-General: Bishwa RTS Kirant

Election symbol

Janamukti Party Nepal is a political party in Nepal. The party is registered with the Election Commission of Nepal ahead of the 2008 Constituent Assembly election.

In the 1999 parliamentary election, Janamukti Party Nepal fielded 26 candidates. They got 9528 votes, but no-one was elected.
