= Nawa Janabadi Morcha =

Nawa Janabadi Morcha नव जनवादी मोर्चा

Election symbol

Nawa Janabadi Morcha (New Democratic Front) is a political party in Nepal. The party is registered with the Election Commission of Nepal ahead of the 2008 Constituent Assembly election.

Nawa Janabadi Morcha demands autonomy for Madhes and a federal set-up.
