= Liberal Samajbadi Party =

Liberal Samajbadi Party लिवरल समाजवादी पार्टी
- President: Dr. Topendra Nath Yogi.
- Founded: 2008
- Ideology: Liberal Socialism

Election symbol

Liberal Samajbadi Party is a political party in Nepal. The party was registered with the Election Commission of Nepal ahead of the 2008 Constituent Assembly election. Its registration was cancelled in 2016.
