= Muskan Sena Nepal Party =

Muskan Sena Nepal Party मुस्कान सेना नेपाल पार्टी
- President: Muskan Paudel

Election symbol

Muskan Sena Nepal Party is a political party in Nepal. The party is registered with the Election Commission of Nepal ahead of the 2008 Constituent Assembly election.
