= League Nepal Shanti Ekta Party =

League Nepal Shanti Ekta Party लिग नेपाल शान्ति एकता पार्टी
- President: Dhanendra Bahadur Basnet

Election symbol

League Nepal Shanti Ekta Party is a political party in Nepal. The party is registered with the Election Commission of Nepal ahead of the 2008 Constituent Assembly election.
