= Nepal Samajbadi Party (Lohiyabadi) =

Nepal Samajbadi Party (Lohiyabadi) नेपाल समाजवादी पार्टी (लोहियावादी)
- President: Bimal Prasad Argariya Yadav
- Headquarters: Birgunj, Parsa District
- Ideology: Socialism
- Colors: Red, Green

Nepal Samajbadi Party (Lohiyabadi) (Nepali: नेपाल समाजवादी पार्टी (लोहियावादी), 'Nepal Socialist Party (Lohiaist)') is a political party in Nepal. As of 2013, the president of the party was Bimal Prasad Argadiya Yadav. The party registered itself with the Election Commission of Nepal ahead of the 2013 Constituent Assembly election, with the support of 10,000 voters. It presented 8 candidates in FPTP constituencies, 3 from Dhanusa district, 3 from Parsa district, 1 from Bara district and 1 from Mahottari district. For the Proportional Representation vote the party submitted a list of 36 candidates, headed by Bimal Prasad Argariya Yadav. The election symbol of the party is a chair.
