= Shanti Party Nepal =

Shanti Party Nepal शान्ति पार्टी नेपाल
- President: Jhanak Prasad Dhungana

Election symbol

Shanti Party Nepal (Peace Party Nepal) is a political party in Nepal. The party contested the 1999 parliamentary election. The party is registered with the Election Commission of Nepal ahead of the 2008 Constituent Assembly election. The party wants to proclaim Nepal as a Hindu state.
