= Nepal Loktantrik Samajbadi Dal =

Nepal Loktantrik Samajbadi Dal नेपाल लोकतान्त्रिक समाजवादी दल
- Leader: Upendra Gachchhadar

Election symbol

Nepal Loktantrik Samajbadi Dal is a political party in Nepal. In the 2008 Constituent Assembly election, the party won 1 seat through the Proportional Representation vote. The party nominated Laxmilal Chaudhary as its representative in the Assembly. The party opposes the demand of the Madhesi political parties for 'One Madhesh, One Pradesh'.
