= Rastrabadi Yuba Morcha =

Rashtrabadi Yuba Morcha राष्ट्रवादी युवा मोर्चा
- President: Shyam Kumar Thapa

Election symbol

Rashtrabadi Yuba Morcha is a political party in Nepal. The party is registered with the Election Commission of Nepal ahead of the 2008 Constituent Assembly election.

== See also ==
political party
Nepal
Election Commission of Nepal
