= Rastriya Janata Dal =

Rastriya Janata Dal राष्ट्रिय जनता दल
- President: Yunus Ansari

Election symbol

Rastriya Janata Dal is a political party in Nepal. The party is registered with the Election Commission of Nepal ahead of the 2008 Constituent Assembly election.
