= Rastriya Jana Ekta Party =

Rastriya Jana Ekta Party राष्ट्रिय जन एकता पार्टी
- President: Manmohan Shamsher Rana

Election symbol

Rastriya Jana Ekta Party is a political party in Nepal. The party is registered with the Election Commission of Nepal ahead of the 2008 Constituent Assembly election.
