= 1999 Nepalese general election =

- 3 and 17 May 1999

All 205 seats in the House of Representatives 103 seats needed for a majority
- Turnout: 65.79%
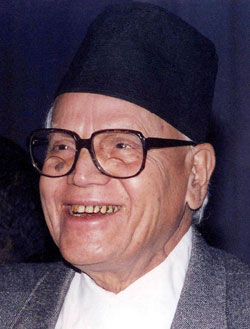

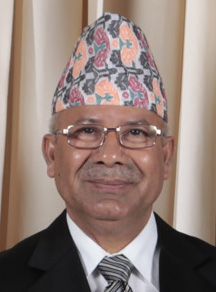

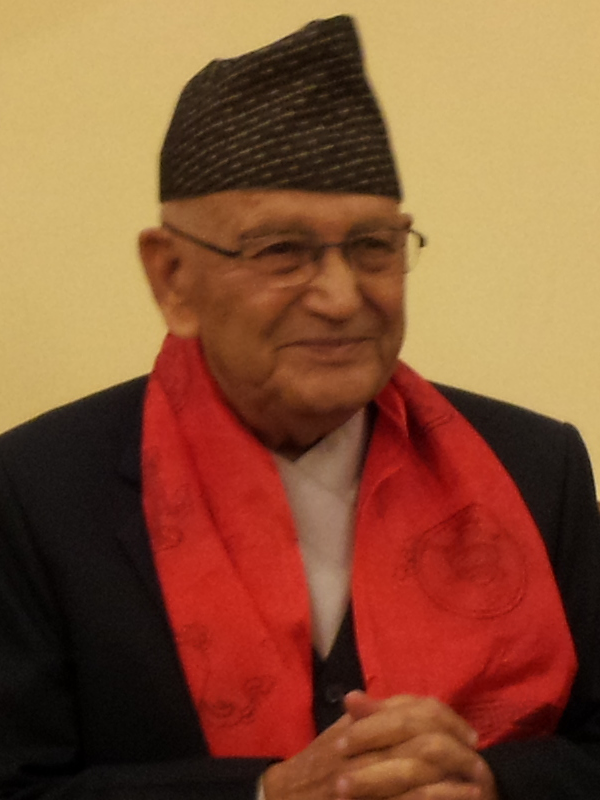
	First party	Second party	Third party
Leader	Krishna Prasad Bhattarai	Madhav Kumar Nepal	Surya Bahadur Thapa
Party	Congress	CPN (UML)	RPP
Last election	83	88	20
Seats won	111	71	11
Seat change	▲28	▼17	▼9
Popular vote	3,214,786	2,734,568	902,328
Percentage	37.17%	31.61%	10.43%
Swing	▲3.70pp	▼0.25pp	▼8.08pp
- Results by constituency
Prime Minister before election
Girija Prasad Koirala
Congress
Prime Minister after election
Krishna Prasad Bhattarai
Congress

General elections were held in Nepal on 3 and 17 May 1999 to elect the House of Representatives. The Nepali Congress emerged as the largest party, gaining 28 seats, while the Communist Party of Nepal (Unified Marxist-Leninist) (CPN–UML) lost 17.

== Background ==
The previous elections to the House of Representatives in 1994 had seen the CPN–UML emerge victorious and the first-ever popularly elected communist government formed. Yet by 1999, infighting, such as the departure of the Bam Dev Gautam and C.P. Mainali led splinter group, had got in the way of policy decisions and put certain people off voting for the party.

== Results ==
Party	Votes	%	Seats
Nepali Congress	3,214,786	37.17	111
Communist Party of Nepal (Unified Marxist–Leninist)	2,734,568	31.61	71
Rastriya Prajatantra Party	902,328	10.43	11
Communist Party of Nepal (Marxist–Leninist)	567,760	6.56	0
Rastriya Prajatantra Party (Chand)	295,812	3.42	0
Nepal Sadbhavana Party	278,435	3.22	5
Rastriya Janamorcha	121,426	1.40	5
Rastriya Janamukti Party	94,860	1.10	0
United People's Front of Nepal	74,669	0.86	1
Nepal Workers Peasants Party	48,685	0.56	1
Nepali Janata Dal	11,748	0.14	0
Janamukti Party Nepal	9,616	0.11	0
Communist Party of Nepal (Marxist)	8,101	0.09	0
Nepal Dalit Shramik Morcha	6,852	0.08	0
Hariyali Nepal Party	6,420	0.07	0
Communist Party of Nepal (United)	5,111	0.06	0
Nepali Janta Party Rastriya Sambriddhibad	4,927	0.06	0
Rastriya Janata Parishad	3,799	0.04	0
Jana Congress	1,992	0.02	0
Shivsena Nepal	1,756	0.02	0
Nepal Socialist Party	950	0.01	0
Bahujan Samaj Party of Nepal	835	0.01	0
Nepal Praja Parishad	817	0.01	0
Samyukta Prajatantra Party Nepal	297	0.00	0
Nepal Samyabadi Party (MLM)	190	0.00	0
Save the Nation Movement	170	0.00	0
Pragati Upayogoto, Nepal	155	0.00	0
Nepal Janabhavana Party	120	0.00	0
Rastrabadi Janata Party	105	0.00	0
Social Democratic Party	97	0.00	0
Samajbadi Garib Party	86	0.00	0
Nepal Janahit Party	68	0.00	0
Nepal Suraksha Party	56	0.00	0
Nepal Rastrabadi Dal	55	0.00	0
Mechi-Mahakali Jana Samanwaya Dal	35	0.00	0
Prajatantric Nepali Janata Party	18	0.00	0
Prajatantra Sagarmatha Dal	11	0.00	0
Liberal Democratic Party	10	0.00	0
Nepal Rastriya Aketa Party	8	0.00	0
Independents	251,930	2.91	0
Total	8,649,664	100.00	205
Valid votes	8,649,664	97.25	
Invalid/blank votes	244,902	2.75	
Total votes	8,894,566	100.00	
Registered voters/turnout	13,518,839	65.79	
Source: Nepal Research

=== Distribution of seats ===
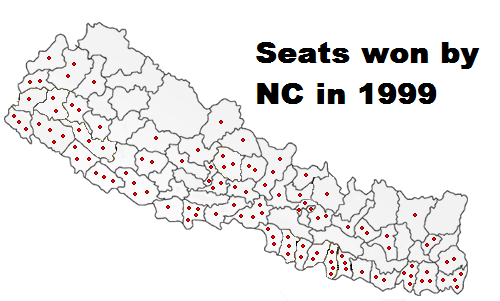
Seats won by Nepali Congress

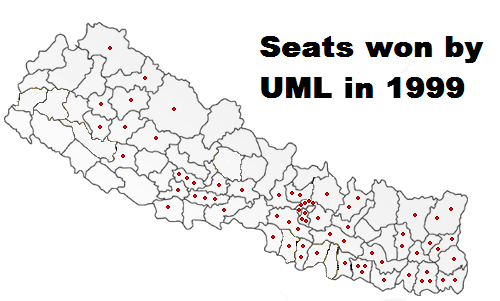
Seats won by CPN(UML)

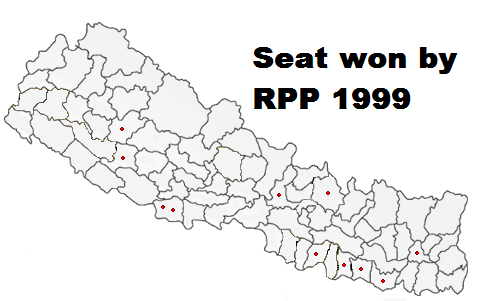
Seats won by Rashtriya Prajatantra Party

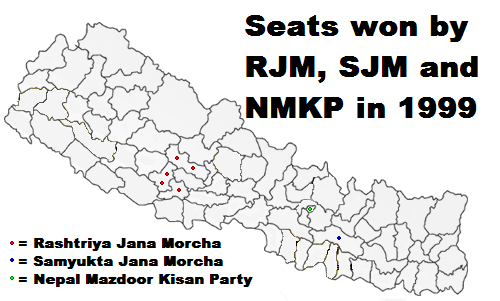
Seats won by Rashtriya Jana Morcha, Samyukta Janamorcha Nepal and Nepal Workers Peasants Party

== Aftermath ==
Following the elections, the various parties found it difficult to cooperate and finalise a policy of the Maoist rebels, culminating in the 2002 dissolution of the parliament by King Gyanendra.

Following the 2006 Loktantra Andolan, in which all of the parties successful in 1999, except the royalist Rashtriya Prajatantra Party participated in the Seven Party Alliance, the House was reinstated in 2006.

== See also ==
- 4th House of Representatives (Nepal)
