= Nepal Socialist Party (disambiguation) =

Nepal Socialist Party may refer to:

- Nepal Socialist Party
- Nepali Congress
- Communist Party of Nepal (Unified Socialist)
- People's Socialist Party, Nepal (2020)
- Democratic Socialist Party (Nepal)

== See also ==
- Samajbadi Party, Nepal (disambiguation)
