= Nepali Congress (Rastrabadi) =

Nepali Congress (Rastrabadi) नेपाली काँग्रेस (राष्ट्रवादी)
- President: Khanuparude (Rambabu Prasai)
- Founded: 2005

Election symbol

Nepali Congress (Rastrabadi) is a political party in Nepal. The party was founded in 2005 by Dura Pokharal (president) and Prakash Koirala. The party is registered with the Election Commission of Nepal ahead of the 2008 Constituent Assembly election.
