= Sa-Shakti Nepal =

Sa-Shakti Nepal स-शक्ति नेपाल
- President: Padmini Pradhananga

Election symbol

Sa-Shakti Nepal is a political party in Nepal. The party is registered with the Election Commission of Nepal ahead of the 2008 Constituent Assembly election. The party works for introducing a 50 percent representation for women quota, formation of cooperatives in villages and employment for women. Chair of the party is Padmini Pradhananga and Sarala Lama is the vice chair of the party.
