= Nepal Samyabadi Dal =

Nepal Samyabadi Dal नेपाल साम्यवादी दल
- President: Ravindra Kumar Basnet

Election symbol

Nepal Samyabadi Dal is a political party in Nepal. The party is registered with the Election Commission of Nepal ahead of the 2008 Constituent Assembly election.
