= Nepal Rastriya Loktantrik Dal =

Nepal Rastriya Loktantrik Dal नेपाल राष्ट्रिय लोकतान्त्रिक दल
- President: Amar K.C.

Election symbol

Nepal Rastriya Loktantrik Dal is a political party in Nepal. The party is registered with the Election Commission of Nepal ahead of the 2008 Constituent Assembly election.
