= Ganga Prasad Prasain =

Indian academic administrator

- Born: 1960 (age 65–66); India
- Citizenship: Indian
- Occupations: Academician, Administrator & Vice-Chancellor
- Years active: 1990 – 2025

Academic background
- Education: Banaras Hindu University

Academic work
- Discipline: Entrepreneurship, Human Resource Management, Marketing & Tourism
- Institutions: Manipur University, Tripura University

Ganga Prasad Prasain (born 1960) is an Indian Academician & Administrator, former Vice-Chancellor of Tripura University from 2020 till 2025. He is the former dean of Manipur University where he served from 1990 till 2020.
