= Tamsaling Nepal Rastriya Dal =

Tamsaling Nepal Rastriya Dal ताम्सालीङ नेपाल राष्ट्रिय दल
- Secretary-General: Parshuram Tamang
- Founded: 2008
- Ideology: Regionalism; Autonomy

Election symbol

Tamsaling Nepal Rastriya Dal is a political party in Nepal affiliated with preserving the Tamang people's ancestral lands. The party was officially founded on February 4, 2008 but had been registered with the Election Commission of Nepal in October 2007, ahead of the 2008 Constituent Assembly election. The founders of the party come from Nepal Tamang Ghedung and other Janajati groups. The party works for a democratic republic, ethnic and regional autonomy and an election system based upon proportional representation.

Founder General Secretary: Tek Bahadur Tamang

Founder Chairman: Parsuram Tamang
