= Nepa Rastriya Party =

Nepa Rastriya Party नेपाः राष्ट्रिय पार्टी
- President: Subarna Kesari Chitrakar (acting)

Election symbol

Nepa Rastriya Party is a political party in Nepal. The party was registered with the Election Commission of Nepal ahead of the 2008 Constituent Assembly election. The party was formed in order to preserve the identity and culture of the Newar community.

In the Constituent Assembly election, the NRP won one seat through the proportional representation vote. The party selected Buddha Ratna Manandhar as its representative in the Assembly.

In July 2008, NRP was one of three minor parties which opposed an amendment of the interim constitution, enabling the formation of a government by simple majority in the Constituent Assembly. NRP called for support to the Maoist-nominated candidate Ram Raja Prasad Singh in the 2008 presidential vote.
