= Sanghiya Loktantrik Rastriya Manch =

Federal Democratic National Front संघीय लोकतान्त्रिक राष्ट्रिय मञ्च
- President: Kumar Lingden
- General Secretary: Sharmila Bagchand
- Founded: 2007
- Student wing: Federal Students Union
- Women's wing: Federal Women's Forum
- Ideology: Ethnic federalism Communalism; Socialism
- Seats in Provincial Assemblies: 1 / 93 (Province No. 1)

Election symbol
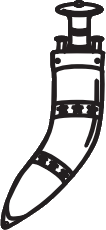

Website
- www.federalnepal.com

The Sanghiya Loktantrik Rastriya Manch (Nepali: संघीय लोकतान्त्रिक राष्ट्रिय मञ्च, lit. 'Federal Democratic National Front') is a political party in Nepal. The party is registered with the Election Commission of Nepal ahead of the 2008 Constituent Assembly election. The party was formed through the coming together of 12 different janajati organisations.

The party agitates for the formation of a Limbuwan autonomous region in North-Eastern Nepal. The Sangiya Limbuwan Rajyaparishad is connected to the party. It is the umbrella organization of Federal Limbuwan State Council, Khumbuwan State, Tamagsaling Autonomous State Council, and United Tharu National Front including 13 other ethnic fronts.

The party is a continuent of the Federal Republic National Front.

== History ==
In the 2017 local elections, the party won seven seats in local governments. The party contested the 2017 legislative and provincial elections. The party did not win any seats in the House of Representatives, but the party won one seat to the Provincial Assembly of Province No. 1 through proportional representation.

== Electoral performance ==
=== Legislative elections ===
Election	Leader	Votes		Seats		Position	Resulting government
Election	Leader	#	%	#	+/-	Position	Resulting government
2008	Kamal Chharahang	71,958	0.67	2 / 575		15th	In opposition
2017	Kumar Lingden	21,610	0.23	0 / 275	▼2	▼17th	Extra-parliamentary
2022	Kumar Lingden	17,805	0.17	0 / 275	Steady	▼20th	Extra-parliamentary

=== Provincial elections ===
==== Province 1 ====
Election	Votes		Seats		Position	Resulting government
Election	#	%	#	+/-	Position	Resulting government
2017	26,123	1.50	1 / 93		6th	In opposition
2017	26,123	1.50	1 / 93		6th	Coalition
2022	26,531	1.40	0 / 93	▼1	▼7th	Extra-parliamentary

== See also ==
- Limbu people
- Limbuwan
