= Federal Limbuwan State Council =

- Official flag of Federal Limbuwan State Council

Federal Limbuwan State Council (FLSC) is an active federal supported political party of eastern Nepal led by Kumar Lingden, advocating an ethnic autonomous region for the Limbu people. It is a merger of 5 former political parties: among them Sanghiya Limbuwan State Council, Limbuwan Mukti Morcha (Limbuwan Liberation Front), Sanghiya Democratic Party all representing Mongoloid Kiranti tribes, having come together in August 2014. The region of their activity mostly centers on Madhesi and Terai districts of the Eastern Development Region, Nepal, which they consider their homeland and they consider Kathmandu reneging on a treaty for autonomy dating back to antiquity as they are the indigenous inhabitants, as their land was invaded by Prithvi Narayan Shah in the 1700s.

FLSC has been actively enforcing strikes and bandh since before promulgation of the new Nepali constitution in 2015. FLSC demands are in direct opposition to protesting 4 Madhesi parties who demand a state that incorporates FLSC territory, as well as in direct opposition to Kathmandu. FLSC however, like Madhesi parties, accuses Kathmandu police forces of unnecessary and excessive force.

== See also ==
- List of regional and ethnicity based parties in Nepal
- Limbuwan
