= Hindu Prajatantrik Party =

Hindu Prajatantrik Party हिन्दु प्रजातान्त्रिक पार्टी
- President: Bishnu Kumar Prasai
- Ideology: Right-wing populism Conservatism; Hindu nationalism

Election symbol

Hindu Prajatantrik Party is the Hindu nationalist political party in Nepal. The goal of this party is to establish Nepal as a Hindu republic.

The party registered with the Election Commission of Nepal ahead of the 2008 Constituent Assembly election. and filed a list of candidates for the proportional representation vote. The party also fielded one candidate for the First Past the Post system, Govind Bahadur B.K. in the Chitwan-1 constituency.
