= Nawa Nepal Prajatantrik Dal =

Nawa Nepal Prajatantrik Dal नव नेपाल प्रजातान्त्रिक दल
- Leader: Kuber Bahadur Raut

Election symbol

Nawa Nepal Prajatantrik Dal ('New Nepal Democratic Party') is a political party in Nepal. The party got 3016 votes in the Proportional Representation vote in the 2008 Constituent Assembly election, being the least voted party in the election. The party had two candidates in the First Past the Post vote, Santosh Raut (37 years) in Kathmandu-1 and Santosh Bahadur Shahi (33 years) in Lalitpur-3. Raut got 20 votes and Shahi 14 votes.
