= Shivsena Nepal =

Shivsena Nepal शिवसेना नेपाल
- President: Anil Baba Basnet
- Founded: 1990
- Headquarters: Lainchaur Kathmandu, Nepal
- Ideology: Hindu nationalism Constitutional monarchism Hindutva
- Political position: Right-wing to far-right

Election symbol

Shivsena Nepal (Nepali: शिवसेना नेपाल; translation: Shiva's Army of Nepal) is a political party in Nepal. It was founded in 1990 by Arun Subedi, in response to the growing demands for secularism following the Jana Andolan movement.

Unlike the Nepal Shivsena, Shivsena Nepal mainly identifies as a religious organisation. While Nepal Shivsena has ties to the Indian Shiv Sena, Shivsena Nepal denies such affiliations.

The party was registered with the Election Commission of Nepal ahead of the 2008 Constituent Assembly election.

When the Taliban began destroying ancient Buddhist artefacts, both Nepal Shiv Sena and Shivsena Nepal strongly condemned the attacks.

== Organization ==
The party claims to have an organization in 36 out of 77 districts of Nepal, with its main base, according to Subedi, being in the Terai region.

== Advocacy for Monarchy ==
After the abolition of the monarchy on 28 May 2008 by the 1st Constituent Assembly election, Shivsena Nepal has consistently advocated for Monarchism.

The party strongly criticises the current constitution of Nepal. Shivsena Nepal's president, Anil Baba, along with its members, continues to call for the restoration of Constitutional Monarchism.

On occasions such as Ashoj 3rd, Shivsena Nepal and its sister organisations in districts like Rupandehi and Sunsari organise rallies in opposition to Nepal's current constitution. The party favours reinstating the 1990 Constitution of Nepal.

Despite their political stance, the party has remained loyal to the former king, Gyanendra.

== Sister Organizations ==
- Shivsena Nepal Rupandehi
- Shivsena Nepal Sunsari
- Shivsena Nepal Achham
- Shivsena Nepal Purbanchal
- Shivsena Nepal Rautahat
