= Rastriya Janata Dal Nepal =

Rastriya Janata Dal Nepal राष्ट्रिय जनता दल नेपाल
- President: Bharat Prasad Mahato

Election symbol

Rastriya Janata Dal Nepal is a political party in Nepal. The party is registered with the Election Commission of Nepal ahead of the 2008 Constituent Assembly election.
