= Rastriya Bikas Party =

Rastriya Bikas Party राष्ट्रिय विकास पार्टी
- President: Dr. Asarphi Shah

Election symbol

Rastriya Bikas Party is a political party in Nepal, formed by elements of the erstwhile panchayat system. The party chair, Dr. Asarphi Shah, was appointed assistant minister for local development, in 2002. The party took part in the 2006 municipal polls. The party is registered with the Election Commission of Nepal ahead of the 2008 Constituent Assembly election.
