= Nepal Dalit Shramik Morcha =

Nepal Dalit Shramik Morcha नेपाल दलित श्रमिक मोर्चा
- Secretary-General: Ravindra Bahadur Sunar

Election symbol

Nepal Dalit Shramik Morcha is a political party in Nepal, founded by Ruplal Bishvakarma. The party took part in the 1999 election, campaigning for rights for lower caste people. The party got 6852 votes.

The party is registered with the Election Commission of Nepal ahead of the 2008 Constituent Assembly election.

Ahead of the Constituent Assembly polls, the party presented a closed proportional representation list with 46 candidates, headed by Roma Bishwakarma. The party presented 1 candidate for the First Past the Post seats, Prem Singh Bishwakarma in the Kailali-6 constituency.
