= Nepal Samata Party =

Political party based in Nepal

Nepal Samata Party नेपाल समता पार्टी
- President: Pasang Goparma Sharma
- Secretary-General: Moti Prasad Rana Magar

Election symbol

Nepal Samata Party is a political party in Nepal. The party is registered with the Election Commission of Nepal ahead of the 2008 Constituent Assembly election. It was led by Narayan Singh Pun, but after Pun's death the chairmanship has been taken over by Pasang Goparma Sharma. Moti Prasad Rana Magar is the general secretary of the party.

== Also see ==
- Samata Party led by Uday Mandal its President.
