= Nepal Janabhavana Party =

Nepal Janabhavana Party नेपाल जनभावना पार्टी
- President: Surya Bahadur Khadka 'Bikharchi'

Election symbol

Nepal Janabhavana Party is a political party in Nepal. The party is registered with the Election Commission of Nepal ahead of the 2008 Constituent Assembly election.

The main goals of the party are equal opportunities, pensions for farmers and making Nepal into a democratic republic.
