= Nepal Rastriya Janakalayan Party =

Nepal Rastriya Janakalayan Party नेपाल राष्ट्रिय जनकल्याण पार्टी
- President: Khushilal Yadav

Election symbol

Nepal Rastriya Janakalayan Party ('Nepal National People's Welfare Party') is a political party in Nepal. The party contested three First Past the Post constituencies in 2008 Constituent Assembly election. Ram Sharan Paswan, 62 years old, contested the Saptari-2 seat and got 30 votes. Khusilal Yadav, 62 years old, contested the Saptari-3 (28 votes) and Saptari-4 (38 votes) constituencies. The party did not contest the Proportional Representation vote.
