= Samajbadi Party Nepal =

Samajbadi Party Nepal समाजवादी पार्टी नेपाल
- President: Salim Miya Ansari

Election symbol

Samajbadi Party Nepal (translation: Socialist Party) is a political party in Nepal, led by Salim Miya Ansari. The party is registered with the Election Commission of Nepal ahead of the 2008 Constituent Assembly election.

Ansari became a minister in 2005, appointed by King Gyanendra. The party won one mayoral post in the 2006 municipal elections. Mohammad Manjur Alam Ansari of the Samajbadi Party Nepal was elected deputy mayor of Kailaya in the same elections.
