= Takashi Miyahara =

Japanese-born Nepalese tourism entrepreneur and politician (1934–2019)

Takashi Miyahara (宮原 巍, Miyahara Takashi; 1934 – November 24, 2019) was a Japanese-born Nepalese tourism entrepreneur and politician. Miyahara was born in Nagano, Japan, and obtained a bachelor's degree in Chemical and Mechanical Engineering from Nihon University, Tokyo. When he moved to Nepal, he began working for the Department of Cottage Industry of Nepal.

Miyahara was the chairman of the boards of Himalaya Hotel in Kathmandu and Trans Himalaya Treks. Miyahara founded Trans Himalaya Tours in 1968 and a Japanese sister company, Himalaya Kanko Kitatsu, in 1969. The following year, he founded Trans Himalayan Trekking. In 2006, Miyahara founded the Nepal Rastriya Bikas Party. He became a citizen of Nepal in order to be able to work politically. At the 2008 election of the Nepalese Constituent Assembly, none of the candidates won the seat.

He died on November 24, 2019, in Nepal. Miyahara lived over 40 years in Nepal.
