= Rastrabadi Ekta Party =

Rashtrabadi Ekta Party राष्ट्रवादी एकता पार्टी
- President: Uma Shrestha 'Hima'

Election symbol

Rashtrabadi Ekta Party is a political party in Nepal. The party is registered with the Election Commission of Nepal ahead of the 2008 Constituent Assembly election.
