= Salim Miya Ansari =

Nepalese politician

Personal details
- Party: Samajbadi Party Nepal

Salim Miya Ansari is a Nepalese politician. In the 1994 election he was elected to the Pratinidhi Sabha as the candidate of the Communist Party of Nepal (Unified Marxist-Leninist) from the Bara-4 constituency. Ansari won with 20148 votes against 16145 votes for Pharmulaha Mansur of the Nepali Congress. Ansari served as Minister of Forest and Soil Conservation in the CPN(UML) government formed in 1994. When the CPN(UML) was divided in 1998, Ansari joined the Communist Party of Nepal (ML), and later became Minister of Tourism in the coalition government. When CPN(ML) and CPN(UML) reunited, Ansari again became a CPN(UML) leader.

In December 2002, Ansari left CPN(UML). He was then a Central Committee member of the party. He subsequently formed the Samajbadi Party Nepal.

In July 2005 Ansari was appointed Minister of Forest and Soil Conservation by King Gyanendra.

On January 30, 2007, Ansari was arrested following riots in the Terai. He was released on February 18, 2007.
