= Lok Kalyankari Janta Party Nepal =

Lok Kalayankari Janata Party Nepal लोक कल्याणकारी जनता पार्टी नेपाल
- Leader: Kishori Mahato

Election symbol

Lok Kalayankari Janata Party Nepal is a political party in Nepal. The party was registered with the Election Commission of Nepal ahead of the 2008 Constituent Assembly election.
