= 2024 Nepalese National Assembly election =

- 25 January 2024

19 seats to the National Assembly
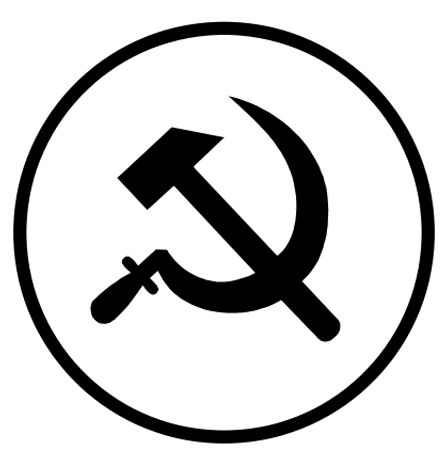

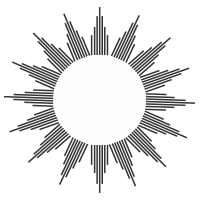

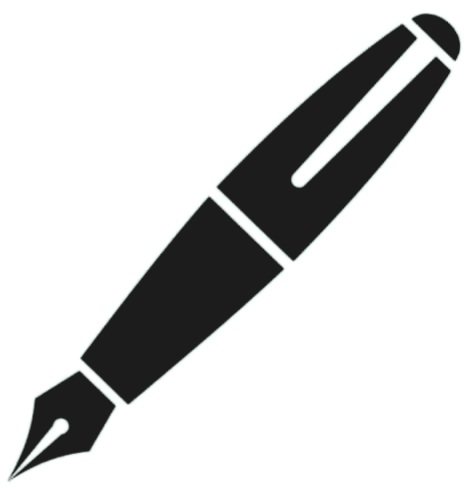

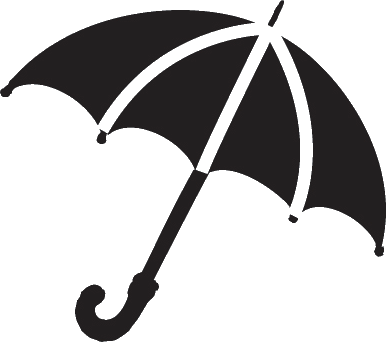

	First party	Second party	Third party
Party	Maoist Centre	Congress	Unified Marxist–Leninist
Seats before	15	10	17
Seats after	17	16	10
Seat change	▲2	▲6	▼7
	Fourth party	Fifth party	Sixth party
Party	Unified Socialist	PSP-Nepal	Independent
Seats before	8	3	1
Seats after	8	3	0
Seat change	Steady	Steady	▼1
Chairperson of the National Assembly before election
Ganesh Prasad Timilsina
CPN (UML)
Elected Chairperson of the National Assembly
Narayan Prasad Dahal
Maoist Centre

National Assembly elections were held in Nepal on 25 January 2024 in order to elect 19 of the 20 retiring Class III members of the National Assembly, the upper house of the Federal Parliament of Nepal. Members of the National Assembly are elected through indirect ballot and serve six year terms with one third of the members retiring after every two years.

== Electoral system ==
Eight members of the National Assembly are elected from each of the seven provinces of Nepal and 3 members are appointed by the President for a total of 59 members. Composition of members from each province have to include three women, a Dalit, and a disabled person or member of a minority. The three remaining are categorized as open/other candidates. All members elected from this election must be from the same category as the retiring members.

Members were elected by Instant-runoff voting by an electoral college composed of members of the respective provincial assembly and Chairperson/Mayor and Vice Chairperson/Deputy Mayor of the local levels within the province. Each provincial assembly member vote has a weight of forty eight whereas each Chairperson/Mayor/Vice Chairperson/Deputy Mayor vote have a weight of eighteen. This electoral college will elect 19 members while 1 member, whose term will also end concurrently, will be nominated by the President on the recommendation of the Government of Nepal.

=== Qualification for members ===
According to Article 87 of the Constitution, a person who meets the following criteria is qualified to become a member of the National Assembly:

- citizen of Nepal,
- completed the age of thirty five years,
- not having been convicted of a criminal offense involving moral turpitude,
- not being disqualified by any Federal law, and
- not holding any office of profit.

== Alliance ==
=== Nepali Congress+ ===
No.	Party	Flag	Symbol	Leader	Photo	Seats Contested	Reference
1.	Nepali Congress			Sher Bahadur Deuba		10	
2.	Communist Party of Nepal (Maoist Centre)			Pushpa Kamal Dahal		6	
3.	Communist Party of Nepal (Unified Socialist)			Madhav Kumar Nepal		2	
4.	People's Socialist Party, Nepal			Upendra Yadav		1	

=== Communist Party of Nepal (Unified Marxist–Leninist) ===
No.	Party	Flag	Symbol	Leader	Photo	Seats Contested	Reference
1.	Communist Party of Nepal (Unified Marxist–Leninist)			KP Sharma Oli		18	

== Results ==
Results
Parties	Seats				
Parties	Total before	Up	Won	Total after	+/-
Maoist Centre	15	3	5	17	▲2
Congress	10	4	10	16	▲6
CPN (UML)	17	8	1	10	▼7
Unified Socialist	8	2	2	8	0
PSP-Nepal	3	1	1	3	0
Loktantrik Samajwadi	1	0	0	1	0
Janamorcha	1	0	0	1	0
Independent	1	1	0	0	▼1
Nominated members (Note: Before the elections there was one nominated member from CPN (UML), one from CPN (MC), and one independent. The seat held by CPN (UML) was up for nomination. The coalition agreed on a candidacy of Durga Paudel from Rastriya Janamorcha for President's nomination.)	3	1	1	3	0
Total	59	20	20	59	0
source=Xinhua
