= Nepal Rastriya Bikas Party =

Nepal Rastriya Bikas Party नेपाल राष्ट्रिय विकास पार्टी
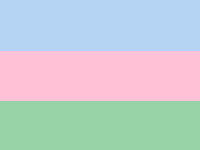
- Leader: Takashi Miyahara
- Founded: 2006
- Headquarters: Lalitpur, Nepal

Election symbol

Website
- nndposix.com

Nepal Rastriya Bikas Party (Nepali: नेपाल राष्ट्रिय विकास पार्टी; translation: Nepal National Development Party) was a political party in Nepal, led by Takashi Miyahara.
