= Khanuparude =

Nepali politician

Khanuparude (Rambabu Prasai)

Personal details
- Party: Nepali Congress (Rastrabadi)

Rambabu Prasai, a.k.a. Khanuparude, is a Nepalese politician. He's the president of the Nepali Congress (Rastrabadi), a splinter group of the Nepali Congress. Khanuparude had been the treasurer of the Nepali Congress and its candidate in the Jhapa-2 constituency in the 1994 election.
