= Nepal Sukumbasi Party (Loktantrik) =

Nepal Sukumbasi Party (Loktantrik) नेपाल सुकुम्वासी पार्टी (लोकतान्त्रिक)
- Leader: Hukum Bahadur Lama
- Headquarters: Kathmandu, Nepal

Election symbol

Nepal Sukumbasi Party (Loktantrik) is a political party in Nepal. The party seeks to represent squatters.

In the 2008 Constituent Assembly election, the party presented 11 candidates in the First Past the Post system and a list of 58 names for the Proportional Representation vote. The party got 1459 votes (0.01%) in the FPTP system and 8322 votes (0.08%) in the PR system.
