= Nepal Janata Party =

Political party in Nepal

Nepal People's Party नेपाल जनता पार्टी
- President: Tribhuwan Nath Pathak
- National Vice president: OM JAISWAL
- General secretary: Sunil Sah Kalwar
- Founded: 2008
- Headquarters: Kathmandu, Nepal
- Ideology: Hindutva; Hindu nationalism
- Political position: Right-wing to far-right
- International affiliation: BJP

Election symbol

Website
- www.njp.org.np

The Nepal Janata Party (Nepali: नेपाल जनता पार्टी, transl. Nepal People's Party) is a political party in Nepal. The party registered with the Election Commission of Nepal ahead of the 2008 Constituent Assembly election. The party is closely associated with the Sangh Parivar. Currently, the election symbol of the party is sacred lotus, and the party is focused in creating a Hindu Rashtra in Nepal. The general secretary of the party is Sunil sah kalwar.
