= Samajbadi Janata Party =

Nepalese political party

Samajbadi Janata Party, Nepal समाजवादी जनता पार्टी, नेपाल
- Chairman: Prem Bahadur Singh
- Split from: CPN (UML)
- Merged into: CPN (UML)
- Ideology: Communism

Election symbol

Samajbadi Prajatantrik Janata Party Nepal (Nepali: समाजवादी प्रजातान्त्रिक जनता पार्टी, नेपाल) was a political party in Nepal.

The party was founded by former CPN(UML) MP Prem Bahadur Singh, after he was expelled from the party for supporting monarchy.

== History ==
=== Formation ===
The party has been registered with the Election Commission, with the moon as its election symbol.

Ahead of the 2008 Constituent Assembly election, the party presented a closed proportional representation list with 175 candidates, headed by Prem Bahadur Singh. The party presented 50 candidates for the First Past the Post seats. The party won 1 seat through the Proportional Representation vote. The party nominated Prem Bahadur Singh as its representative.

== Alliance ==
On 19 January 2017, the party for the first time joined the government, for which chairman Prem Bahadur Singh joined the Second Dahal coalition government as the Minister for Water Supply and Sanitation.
