= Bahujan Samaj Party of Nepal =

Bahujan Samaj Party of Nepal बहुजन समाज पार्टी नेपाल
- President: Madan Bahadur Pradhan
- Inspiration: Bahujan Samaj Party of India

Election symbol
- Giraffe

Bahujan Samaj Party, Nepal (Majority Society Party, Nepal) is a Nepalese political party. It is inspired by the Kanshi Ram's Bahujan Samaj Party of India and led by Madan Bahadur Pradhan. In the 1999 general elections it had 3 candidates. The party got 0.01% of the votes nationwide. Right now its national president is Ganga Prasad Mahara.

== See also ==
- Bahujan Samaj
