= Nepali Janata Dal =

Nepali People's Party नेपाली जनता दल
- President: Haricharan Shah
- Headquarters: Anamnagar
- Ideology: Progressivism; Nationalism; Socialism

Election symbol
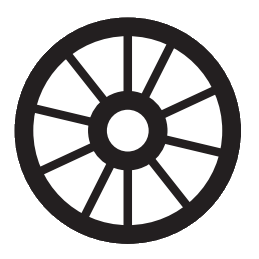

The Nepali Janata Dal (NJD; Nepali: नेपाली जनता दल, lit. 'Nepali People's Party') is a political party in Nepal. The party was established in 1995 as the United People's Party. The party identifies itself as progressive, nationalist and socialist.

Hari Charan Shah is the party chairman, Rajan Gautam and Chandeshwar Chaudhary the vice-Chairman, Shankar Singh Thakuri the General secretary. In total, the Central Committee of the party has 151 members.

In the 2008 Constituent Assembly election, the NJD won two seats through the proportional representation vote. It got 48990 PR votes (0.46%). The party selected Vishwanath Prasad Agrawal and Gayatri Shah as its representatives in the assembly. Gayatri Shah was the nominated parliamentary leader of the party.

== Merged Political Parties ==
  - Jan Yug Party -Nav Raj Subedi

== CA Members ==
2008:

- Hon. Gayatri Shah
- Hon. Vishwanath Pr. Agrawal

2013:

- Hon. Haricharan Shah

== Women organisation ==
- Chairman - Shova Sangraula(9851217587-Bhaktapur)

== Mission 2084 ==
- 1-1 MPA from every Province
- 3% threshold complete
- 1-1 MP from every Province
- Target 1 lakh votes from every province

== Province Head Leaders ==
- Koshi Pradesh:- Rajkumar Jaiswal(9805302063)
- Madhesh Province:- Satyanarayan Pr. Kushwaha(9801062470)
- Bagmati Pradesh:-Nishchal Joci(9851012767)
- Gandaki Pradesh:-Muktinath Subedi(9856028991)
- Lumbini Pradesh:-Rabi B. C.(9848153160)
- Karnali Pradesh :- Bal Bahadur Giri(9847889160)
- Sudurpaschim Pradesh:- Uttam Bahadur Chand(9861492467)

== 2022 General Election ==
Nepali Janta Dal has got 10,137 votes in 2022 general election.

== National team ==
- Chairman - Hon. Haricharan Sah
- V. Chairman - Chandeshwar Chaudhary(9702440386)
- V. Chairman - Rajan Gautam(9842582435)
- General Secretary -Shankar Singh Thakuri(9841330188)
- V. General Secretary - Nishchal Joshi(9851012767)
- Secretary - Shyam Bhandari(9841535889)
- Treasurer - Rabinkaji Palanchaukai

== Electoral performance ==
=== Nepalese Legislative Elections ===
Election	Leader	Votes		Seats		Position	Resulting government
Election	Leader	#	%	#	+/-	Position	Resulting government
2008	Hari Charan Shah	48,990	0.46	2 / 575		18th	CPN (Maoist)–CPN (UML)–MJFN
2013	Hari Charan Shah	33,203	0.35	1 / 575	▼1	▼23rd	Congress–CPN (UML)–RPP
2017	Hari Charan Shah	22,049	0.23	0 / 275	▼1	▲16th	CPN (UML)–CPN (Maoist Centre)

== New C. C. Members ==
- Ishwari Khadka, Dolkha
- Shova Sangraula, Jhapa
- Khagendra Shivakoti, Dolkha
