= 2008 Nepalese Constituent Assembly election =

- 10 April 2008

575 of the 601 seats in the Constituent Assembly 301 seats needed for a majority
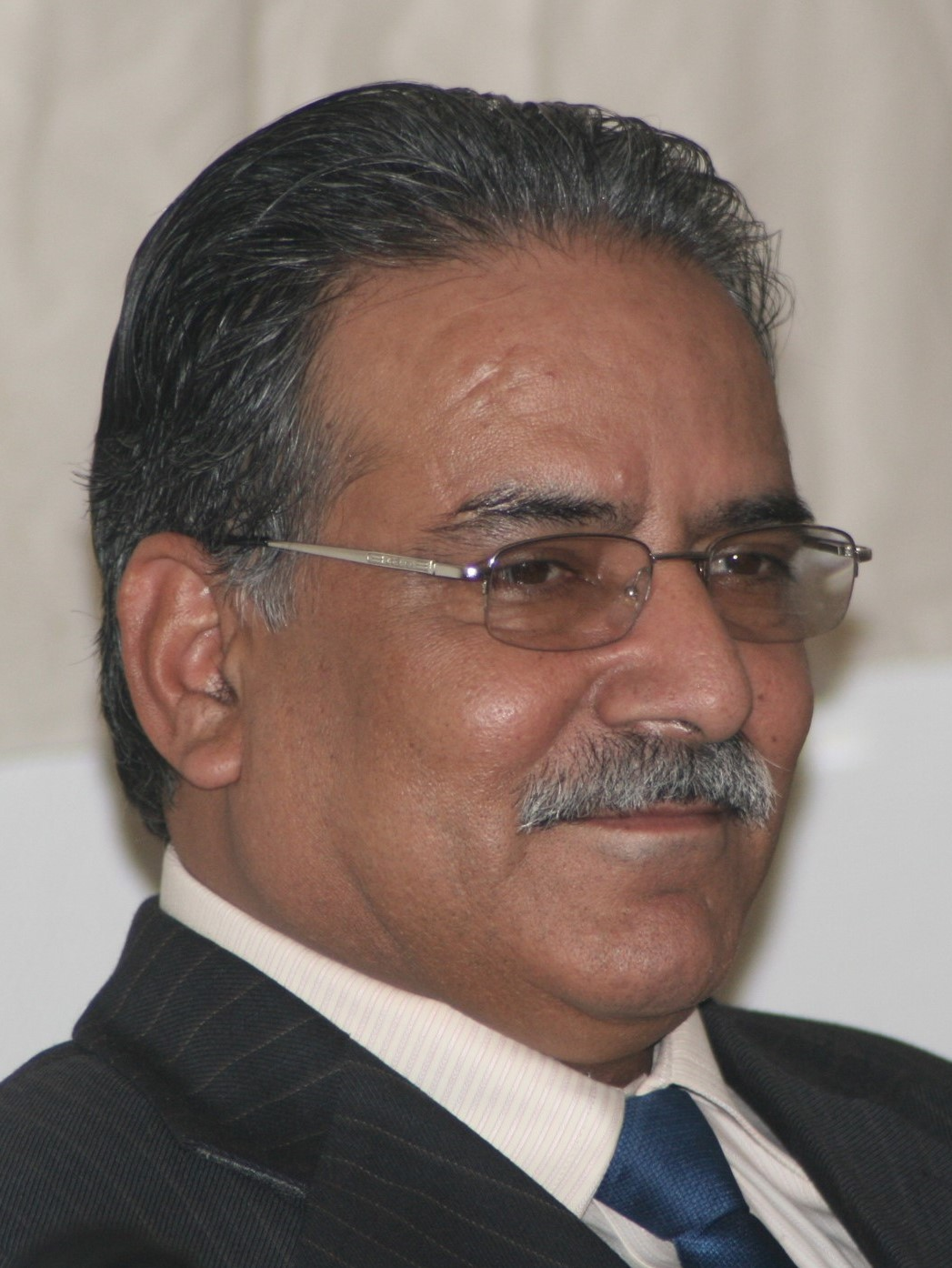

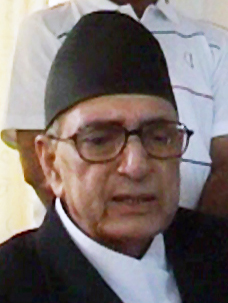

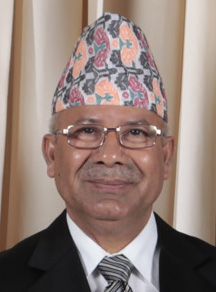

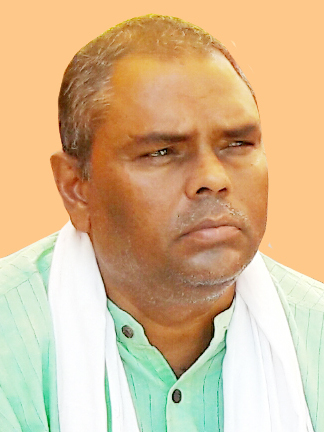

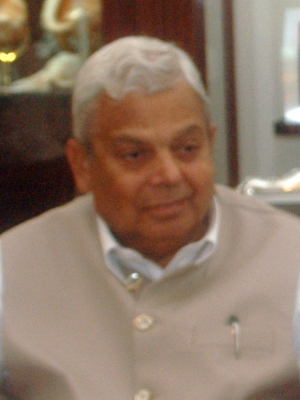
	First party	Second party	Third party
Leader	Pushpa Kamal Dahal	Girija Prasad Koirala	Madhav Kumar Nepal
Party	CPN (Maoist)	Congress	CPN (UML)
Seats won	220	110	103
Popular vote	3,144,204	2,269,883	2,183,370
Percentage	29.28%	21.14%	20.33%
	Fourth party	Fifth party
Leader	Upendra Yadav	Mahantha Thakur
Party	MJF-N	TMLP
Seats won	52	20
Popular vote	678,327	338,930
Percentage	6.32%	3.16%
Prime Minister before election
Girija Prasad Koirala
Congress
Prime Minister after election
Pushpa Kamal Dahal
CPN (Maoist)

Constituent Assembly elections were held in Nepal on 10 April 2008, having been postponed from earlier dates of 7 June 2007 and 22 November 2007. The Constituent Assembly was planned to draft a new constitution and therefore decide, amongst other things, on the issue of federalism. The number of eligible voters was around 17.5 million. The Constituent Assembly was originally set to have a term of two years.

The Communist Party of Nepal (Maoist) (CPN (M)), placed first in the election with 220 out of 575 elected seats, and became the largest party in the Constituent Assembly. It was followed by the Nepali Congress with 110 seats and the Communist Party of Nepal (Unified Marxist–Leninist) with 103 seats. After months of power-sharing discussions and deliberations, CPN (M) Chairman Prachanda was elected as Prime Minister in August 2008. Due to its failure in drafting a new constitution, the CA was dissolved on 28 May 2012 after its original and extended total tenure of four years.

== Background ==
The Election Constituency Delimitation Commission recommended these numbers and distribution of seats:

- 335 members would be elected through a proportionate electoral system.
- 240 members through election in constituencies.
- 26 members on recommendation by the Council of Ministers.

The first delay for holding the assembly occurred due to the lack of preparation on behalf of the Election Commission as well as the seven parties that were at the helm of the government. The second delay, on 5 October 2007, occurred because the Maoists demanded that a republic be declared before the election and that a fully proportional system be used in the election instead of a mixed system. A compromise was agreed to on 4 November: the election would use a fully proportional system, but the republic would only be declared immediately after the Constituent Assembly election.

On 4 November, most parties in the interim parliament voted in favour of a Maoist proposal calling for a fully proportional election system. However, an absolute majority could not be achieved because the then largest party in the parliament, Nepali Congress, vehemently opposed the idea. Later, the problem was resolved when all of the parties agreed to an election where 60% of the elected seats would be allocated by the proportional system, and the remaining 40% by the direct system of election.

On 15 December, the government considered an amendment to the constitution. This amendment moved the deadline for Constituent Assembly elections from 15 December 2007 to 12 April 2008, and changed the membership of the Constituent Assembly: the seats for the proportional representation system were increased to 335 and the members nominated by the prime minister were increased to 26 from 17. As specified in the Election to Members of the Constituent Assembly Act (2007), party list representation will be calculated using a result divisor method, the Sainte-Laguë method.

The seats for first-past-the-post elections remained at 240, making the total number 601 seats instead of the earlier 497. The word "republic" was also included, but will have to be confirmed by the Constituent Assembly. The agreement was officially adopted on 23 December 2007 by the government and the Maoists stated they would rejoin the government shortly. The interim parliament approved the deal on 28 December, with 270 in favor and three opposed.

The Election Commission gave the parties which wished to register for the polls a new deadline of 14 January 2008; parties which had previously registered did not have to re-register. On 11 January, the Cabinet decided to hold the election on 10 April.

Ahead of the election, the Rastriya Prajatantra Party Nepal party sought to form a front of royalist parties. Another monarchist alliance, Samyukta Samabeshi Morcha, was also formed before the election.

An estimated 60% of the 17.6 million voters cast ballots, many of them lining up before dawn outside the 20,000 polling stations. The election of the 601-seat Constituent Assembly to write a new constitution was touted as the cornerstone of a 2006 peace deal struck with the Maoists-rebels, ending the Nepali Civil War in 2006 that forced Nepal's king Gyanendra to cede power, which he had seized in the year 2005. The election held great symbolic value for many in the impoverished Himalayan nation, where 60% of the 27 million people are under age 35 and many voted for the first time.

The Maoists left the interim government on 18 September 2007, citing the non-fulfillment of their demands (which included declaration of a republic before the elections). They stated they would launch street protests in favour of a republic and to ensure the elections will be held, but would also keep to the ceasefire. The Prime Minister stated that declaring a republic through the interim parliament would lack legitimacy. According to some analysts, the Maoists were worried that they lack support and were trying to avoid suffering an embarrassing election defeat at the polls.

On 26 September 2007, the Nepali Congress abandoned its tacit support for a constitutional monarchy and called on the Constituent Assembly to call for the monarch's abdication. The nomination deadline was extended on 30 September 2007 upon the request of the Seven Party Alliance.

The United Nations Security Council on 26 October 2007 called for the election to be held before the end of 2007.

An agreement with the United Democratic Madhesi Front was reached on 28 February 2008, thus ending their general strike. The agreement also included a provision increasing the proportion of seats reserved for the Madhesi minority from 20% to 30%. Furthermore, the parties were allowed to file for the election with an additional deadline set; the constituent parties of the United Madhesi Democratic Front (Madhesi Jana Adhikar Forum, Terai Madhesh Loktantrik Party, Sadbhavana Party) did so, as well as some others (including the Anandisingh Devi-led NSP(A), Nepal Samyabadi Dal, Rastriya Janashakti Party – who had stated they would boycott the election unless the Madhesi issue was resolved –, Nawa Janabadi Morcha, Nepali Rastriya Janabhavana Party, Rastriya Bikas Party and Rastrabadi Yuba Morcha).

== Election ==
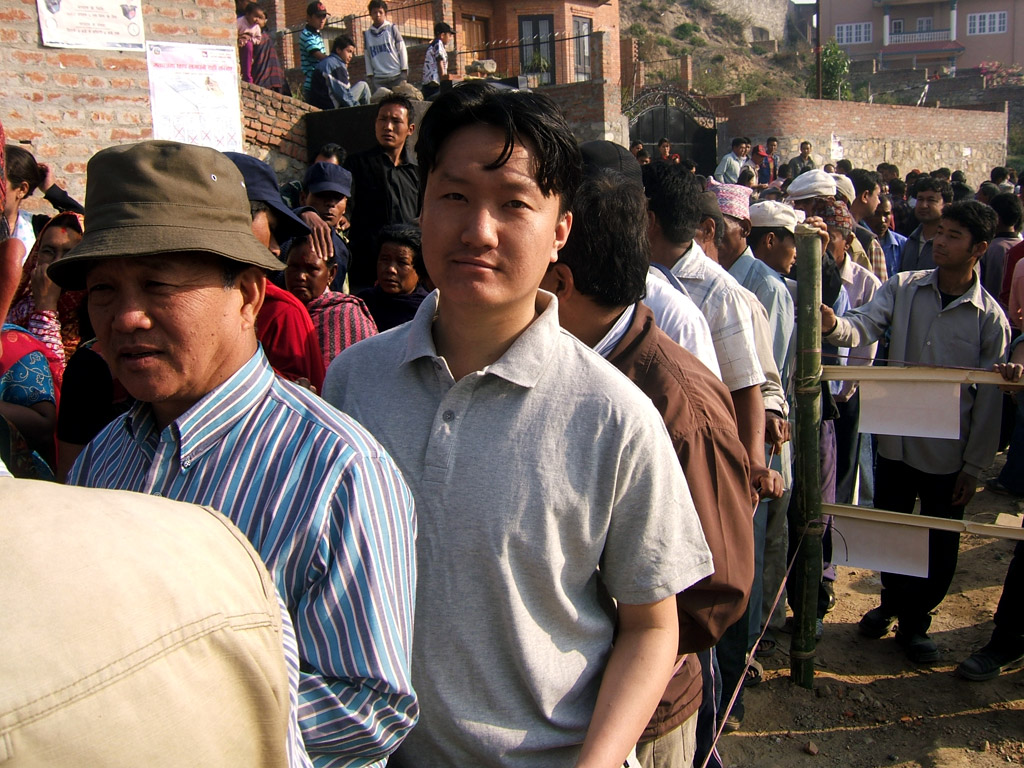
Voters lining up at the polling station

Shortly before the election, Rishi Prasad Sharma, a CPN (UML) candidate in Jahare Bazar town in Surket district, was killed, and the election there was delayed; another person was shot and killed by police during protests regarding Sharma's death. A Congress party rally on 7 April was attacked with a bomb; a bomb also went off near the UN mission in Kathmandu. On 8 April, police killed six Maoists who were engaged in clashes with Congress supporters in Dang district. Prachanda met with Koirala and emphasized the need to "show restraint and have a fair and free election". Gyanendra called "upon all adult citizens to exercise their democratic right in a free and fair environment".

About 135,000 police troops were deployed to provide security for the election, and there were about 20,000 polling stations. Travel and the sale of alcohol were banned while the election was held. On election day, Maoists reportedly tried to seize a polling station in Galkot and then set fire to it; 15 attackers were said to have been arrested. The Maoist leadership said that it was investigating this and that it was not trying to interfere with the election or disrupt it. In Chitwan district, "scuffles among party representatives" led to the suspension of voting at three polling stations. In Janukpur, a candidate was fired upon but was not injured; in Sarlahi district, an independent candidate was shot and killed. An activist was killed in clashes in Sunsari district. Despite such incidents, the election was deemed generally peaceful although held in a 'general atmosphere of fear and intimidation.'

Although voting was called off at 33 polling stations, the overall national voter turnout stood approximately at 60%. In many places, there was applause at the beginning and ending of voting.

On 12 April 2008, it was reported that the CPN (M) had won in three of the five constituencies where vote-counting had been completed. The Nepali Congress and the CPN (UML) each won one constituency. Early results also appeared favorable to the CPN (M) in 55 other constituencies where counting was continuing. A complete count in all 240 constituencies was expected to take several weeks.

Results from later on the same date showed that CPN (M) has won five of the seven declared seats, and was leading in 56 of the other 102 currently being counted; it was noted that the CPN (M) were more successful than analysts expected, as they were believed to be likely to come only in third place.

Polls were ordered to be repeated in at least 60 polling stations across 16 constituencies and 10 districts, though that number is likely to increase. The numbers were announced to have increased to 98 polling stations, 21 constituencies, 12 districts on 14 April 2008.

With the CPN (M) appearing to have won the election, Prachanda pledged that the party would work together with other parties in crafting the new constitution, and he assured the international community, particularly India and China, that the party wanted good relations and cooperation. He also said that the party had expressed its commitment to multi-party democracy through the election and that it would be faithful to its mandate from the people "to consolidate lasting peace".

Gyanendra expressed satisfaction at "the enthusiastic participation of the Nepali people" in the election.

Results from 17 April 2008 showed CPN (M) winning 116 seats, CPN (UML) 31 seats and the Nepali Congress 32 seats of the 218 seats declared so far.

As of 17 April, 26 women had seats in the new assembly, 22 from the CPN (M), one from the Nepali Congress, two from the Madhesi Jana Adhikar Forum, Nepal and one from Terai Madhesh Loktantrik Party.

Pro-monarchy politician Rudra Bahadur from the Rastriya Prajatantra Party, who had failed to be elected in his constituency, was found murdered on 18 April 2008 in his home. Around the same time, Prachanda stated that he would "take the initiative to talk to the king in person" in hopes of convincing him to abdicate; he said that, after leaving the throne, Gyanendra could still live in Nepal and remain involved in business.

The CPN (M) won a plurality of seats in the election: 220 out of 575 (the remaining 26 members are to be chosen by the government formed after the election), with 120 seats through first-past-the-post constituencies and 100 through proportional representation. The party has said that, because it won more seats than any other party, it is entitled to lead the government.

Communist Party of Nepal (United) list MP Sunil Babu Pant is the first openly gay MP elected in Nepal.

== Opening of the Constituent Assembly, declaration of the Republic ==
The official and final list of members elected under the PR system was released on 8 May 2008; this meant the first meeting of the CA (which has to be held within 21 days of the publication of the final result) would be held before the end of May 2008. On 12 May 2008, it was announced that the first session of the CA would be held on 28 May 2008. The members of the CA were sworn in on 27 May 2008.

At the first session of the Constituent Assembly on 28 May, it voted to declare Nepal a federal democratic republic, thereby abolishing the monarchy. Five hundred and sixty-four members of the Constituent Assembly voted on this motion, with 560 in favor and four opposed. Of all the parties represented in the Constituent Assembly, only the Rastriya Prajatantra Party Nepal (RPP-Nepal) opposed the motion. Koirala said that Nepal was entering a new era and that "the nation's dream has come true", while celebrations took place in Kathmandu; 29 and 30 May were declared to be public holidays by the government. The Constituent Assembly also decided that Gyanendra should leave the Narayanhity Palace within 15 days.

Earlier on 28 May, the major parties agreed on the creation of the position of president, while the prime minister was to hold executive powers; however, they reached no agreement on exactly what powers the President should have or who should become president, and these deliberations led to a delay in the opening of the constituent assembly.

On 29 May, the royal standard was removed from Narayanhity Palace and replaced with the national flag. Gyanendra reportedly said on 2 June that he accepted the Constituent Assembly's decision.

== Power-sharing discussions ==
Thirteen parties, including the CPN (M), the NC, and the CPN (UML), met at the Ministry of Peace and Reconstruction on 1 June; no agreement was reached regarding power arrangements. The CPN (M) pressed its demand for both the positions of President and Prime Minister, but the NC and CPN (UML) were unwilling to accept this. The NC wanted these positions to be chosen through a simple majority vote in the Constituent Assembly.

Addressing a rally in Gorkha district on 1 June, Prachanda gave Koirala an ultimatum to present his resignation to the Constituent Assembly within two or three days, warning that if he failed to do so, the Maoist members of the government would resign and the party would lead street protests.

After Gyanendra requested that the government make arrangements for his residence on 1 June, the government decided on 4 June to give another palace, the Nagarjuna Palace, to Gyanendra. Also on 4 June, Prachanda and Koirala met; at this meeting Prachanda demanded that the government step aside by 5 June and again threatened street protests On the same day, the three main parties held a meeting at which they again failed to reach an agreement, but the parties agreed on the need for a few more days and the CPN (M) postponed its deadline for the government to step aside to allow for this period.

On 5 June, the CPN (M) softened its position, deciding at a meeting of its Central Secretariat that it would not press its claim to the presidency and that it would instead favor having a member of civil society become president. The party expressed continued opposition to a proposal that would allow the Prime Minister to be dismissed by a simple majority vote of the Constituent Assembly.< Despite the Maoist desire to have a neutral figure as president, the Nepali Congress proposed Koirala for the position.

The Constituent Assembly held its second sitting on 5 June; due to the three major parties' deadlock, this sitting was very brief, lasting less than a half-hour, and took no major decisions.

On 11 June, Gyanendra gave a brief press conference at Narayanhiti, stating his acceptance of the republic and promising cooperation. He also said that he intended to stay in Nepal, asserted that he held no property outside of Nepal, and expressed his hope that he would be allowed to keep his property. He left Narayanhiti on the same evening and went to his new residence at Nagarjuna.

Shortly after another meeting between Prachanda and Koirala, the CPN (M) ministers announced their resignations and sent a joint resignation letter to Prachanda on 12 June. According to the CPN (M) Minister for Local Development, Dev Gurung, the purpose of the resignations was to "accelerate the process of formation of a new government and bring an end to the current transitional period". However, some considered the resignations to be a means of increasing pressure on Koirala. The resignations were not immediately submitted to Koirala by the CPN (M), and therefore were not made effective. Gurung said that he expected a coalition government to be formed by 18 June.

Also on 12 June, CPN (UML) General Secretary Jhal Nath Khanal asserted that a member of his party should become president. On 14 June he blamed the CPN (M) for the deadlock. At a meeting with Communist Party of Nepal (Marxist-Leninist) General Secretary C. P. Mainali on 14 June, Koirala stressed the importance of power-sharing according to the popular mandate and consensus. Mainali expressed the view that the Maoists should be allowed to lead the government, while the post of President should go to someone from the Nepali Congress and the post of Chairman of the Constituent Assembly should go to someone from the CPN (UML). Meanwhile, Prachanda rejected the possibility of Koirala becoming president, saying that this would be a "dishonour to the people's mandate"; he also expressed concern that having Koirala as president could cause the development of a separate power center from the government, in addition to noting Koirala's advanced age and health problems. Prachanda said that the President should come from a smaller party rather than from the Nepali Congress or the CPN (UML).

Koirala said on 15 June that he would not "run around pleading" for the presidency. Prachanda, meanwhile, said that he expected the new government to be formed imminently, calling on other parties to support this and warning that anyone contravening the people's mandate would have a "heavy price" to pay. Another meeting of the three main parties on 16 June ended in continued disagreement on the key issues, and the CPN (M) said that it would submit the resignations of its ministers to Koirala if the next meeting on 17 June did not produce an agreement.

CPN (UML) General Secretary Khanal said on 17 June that it was important for the left-wing parties to work together. While saying that the CPN (UML) and the CPN (M) would cooperate in the future, he noted that it would be necessary for the parties to improve their difficult relationship. The CPN (M) Central Secretariat met on the same day and approved the decision to hold firm on the key issues and for its ministers to resign if an agreement was not reached later in the day. The party chose to support Ramraja Prasad Singh for the presidency. Upendra Yadav, the Coordinator of the Madhesi Janadhikar Forum, also said on 17 June that his party would not participate in the government and would instead be an opposition party, and he stressed the importance of cooperation among the Madhesi parties. Although he criticized the three main parties for focusing on their power struggle, he endorsed the Maoist claim to lead the government, while asserting that some of the key portfolios should be given to other parties.

The Constituent Assembly went into indefinite recess on 18 June. The three main parties continued their discussions on that day, but did not reach an agreement. However, CPN (M) spokesman Krishna Bahadur Mahara said that they were getting closer to an agreement, and he said that the party had postponed its deadline to 19 June.

On 19 June, the three main parties reached an agreement providing for a constitutional amendment that would enable a government to be formed or dismissed by a simple majority vote of the Constituent Assembly, rather than the previously required two-thirds majority vote. An agreement was also concluded on the issue of integrating Maoist fighters into the national army. However, the parties did not yet agree on a way to resolve the question of power-sharing. Later that day, the Seven-Party Alliance held a meeting at which Koirala said that he was prepared to resign at any time.

The CPN (M) and the CPN (UML) leadership met early on 20 June, and afterwards Khanal said that the CPN (M) had "responded positively" to the CPN (UML)'s proposal to have someone from the CPN (UML) as president. A leading member of the CPN (UML) said that the two parties had agreed on the candidacy of Madhav Kumar Nepal, the former General Secretary of the CPN (UML). However, a leading member of the CPN (M) disputed this, saying that the two parties were closer to an agreement but that their party had not agreed to support a CPN (UML) candidate; he said that both Nepal and Sahana Pradhan (whose name was proposed by the CPN (M)) had been discussed as candidates.

The Nepal Federation of Indigenous Nationalities (NFIN) met with Koirala on 20 June, seeking a recommendation that indigenous peoples not already represented in the Constituent Assembly be included in it through the 26 nominated seats. Koirala, who was supportive of the NFIN's request, also sharply criticized his rivals on this occasion, saying that they were practicing petty politics and were not respecting the people's mandate to work on a consensus basis. The Maoist ministers submitted their joint resignation at a meeting of the seven parties on 20 June.

Sher Bahadur Deuba of the Nepali Congress said on 24 June that the CPN (M) was responsible for the deadlock and claimed that it was working to divide the Seven-Party Alliance. He also said that Koirala would resign after the election of a President and that the CPN (M) had no authority to demand his resignation before then. Also on 24 June, the seven parties agreed on the introduction of a constitutional amendment providing for the election of a President and the formation of a government through simple majority votes. There was, however, disagreement over the Nepali Congress proposal to include a member of the opposition on the National Security Council; the CPN (M) and the CPN (UML) described this as undemocratic. There was also a proposal to include members of each of the seven parties on the National Security Council. Despite the failure to agree about the opposition's inclusion on the National Security Council, it was agreed to give the opposition a place on the Constitutional Council. The parties also reached agreement on a number of issues related to peace, disarmament and reintegration. A decision was also reached with to divide the 26 nominated seats in the Constituent Assembly between nine parties: the CPN (M) was to receive nine of these seats, while the Nepali Congress and the CPN (UML) would each receive five, the Madhesi Janadhikar Forum would receive two, and the Sadbhavana Party, the Nepal Workers and Peasants Party, Janamorcha Nepal, and the Communist Party of Nepal-Marxist Leninist would each receive one nominated seat.

== Resignation of Koirala, Madhesi demands ==
The Council of Ministers approved the constitutional amendment late on 25 June. At a meeting of the Constituent Assembly on 26 June, Koirala announced his resignation, although it will not be finalized until after the election of a President, to whom the resignation must be submitted. Although it was expected that the constitutional amendment would be approved at the same meeting, it was not introduced after Madhesi members of the Constituent Assembly demanded that the amendment be expanded to incorporate a March 2008 agreement between the Madhesis and the government that provided for Madhesi autonomy, among other things. As a result of this, the Constituent Assembly meeting was suspended until 28 June. After meeting with Koirala on 27 June, Hridayesh Tripathy of the Terai Madhesh Loktantrik Party (TMLP) said that Koirala was in favor of incorporating the Madhesi agreement into the amendment and that he asked the Madhesis not to disrupt the Constituent Assembly again.

On 28 June, the seven parties met to discuss the Madhesi demands; although no decision was reached, all of the parties opposed the Madhesi demand for a single province. The Constituent Assembly met later that day and was again disrupted by representatives of the Madhesi parties, forcing the cancellation of the meeting after only a few minutes. The next Constituent Assembly meeting on 29 June was also disrupted by the Madhesis and was cancelled. Jaya Prakash Gupta, a leading figure in the Madhesi Janadhikar Forum (MJF), also warned on 29 June that the Madhesi parties would "not only obstruct the Constituent Assembly but also paralyse the entire nation to force [the seven parties] to meet our demands." Prachanda, in an interview on 30 June, expressed frustration with the Madhesi parties' disruption, which occurred just after Koirala's resignation, when it appeared the road to forming a new government was clear. He said that he favored Madhesi autonomy, but opposed their demand for all of Terai to become one Madhesi province. Khanal, the CPN (UML) General Secretary, flatly rejected the demand for a single Madhesi province, condemning it as "a game to disintegrate the nation". He said that the demand ignored the wishes of other ethnic groups in the Terai.

The Constituent Assembly met on 30 June but was again disrupted by the Madhesis and the meeting was cancelled. The three main parties reached an agreement with the three Madhesi parties, the MJF, the TMLP, and the Nepal Sadbhavana Party, on 1 July, providing for a supplementary amendment bill that would meet the Madhesi demands. Another meeting of the Constituent Assembly was disrupted by the Madhesis and aborted on 2 July, while the CPN (M), Nepali Congress, and CPN (UML) met to decide the draft text of the supplementary amendment bill.

The CPN (M) and MJF met on 3 July, and the CPN (M) agreed to include a reference to Madhesi autonomy in the bill, while also saying that it wanted the bill to mention other indigenous groups' desire for autonomy. Thirteen small parties in the Constituent Assembly said on 3 July that they were completely opposed to the Madhesi demand for a single autonomous province, and they criticized the larger parties for the political deadlock that prevented discussion of the issues from taking place in the Constituent Assembly.

Sessions of the Constituent Assembly were attempted on 3 and 4 July, but both were immediately disrupted by the Madhesi members and were aborted. On the latter occasion, Kul Bahadur Gurung, who chaired the session, urged the Madhesi members to respect the right of other members to be heard, but they ignored him. On 4 July, the CPN (M), Nepali Congress, and CPN (UML) agreed on a draft supplementary amendment bill intended to satisfy the Madhesi demands. The draft requires the State Restructuring Commission to consider the March 2008 agreement between the government and the Madhesis when drawing up Nepal's federal structure. A meeting of the Seven Party Alliance followed the three-party agreement, and at this meeting, the People's Front Nepal, United Left Front, and Nepal Workers and Peasants Party objected to the draft, saying that it would endanger national unity. The cabinet approved the bill late on 4 July; at the same time, it decided to nominate the 26 remaining members of the Constituent Assembly, dividing the seats between nine parties in accordance with the parties' earlier agreement and the lists of names they presented.

The Madhesi parties quickly deemed the supplementary amendment bill to be an unacceptable "betrayal". Khanal, the CPN (UML) General Secretary, said that the bill should satisfy the Madhesi demands, and he warned that opposition to the bill would not be in Madhesi interests or in the interests of any of the peoples of Terai. He called on the Madhesi members to make proposals and engage in discussion in the Constituent Assembly instead of disrupting it.

On 6 July, at a meeting between the three main parties and the Madhesi parties, the former agreed to formulate a new bill to replace the one agreed upon two days prior, while the latter agreed to stop disrupting the Constituent Assembly. Twenty-three of the 26 nominated members of the Constituent Assembly were sworn in on 7 July; the remaining three were unable to attend the swearing in ceremony. On 8 July, the Seven Party Alliance, with the exception of the Nepal Workers and Peasants Party, agreed on the content of a new draft bill, according to which federal structures would be created in line with the wishes of the Madhesis and other ethnic groups.

The Constituent Assembly was able to meet and function on 9 July, for the first time since the Madhesis began pressing their demands on 26 June. Although they did not disrupt the Constituent Assembly on this occasion, the three Madhesi parties furiously condemned the proposed bill and vowed that their struggle would continue. During the Constituent Assembly meeting, they submitted a protest notice, and when this was rejected, they chose to boycott the Constituent Assembly's proceedings. Narendra Bikram Nemwang, the Minister for Law, Justice and Parliamentary Affairs, tabled the bill regardless.

Koirala said on 11 July that forming a government was the responsibility of the CPN (M). However, the CPN (M) criticized the Nepali Congress on 12 July for "obstructing the process [of forming a government] for the past three months". To protest the amendment bill, the Madhesi parties boycotted the Constituent Assembly meeting held on 13 July, at which the amendment bill was considered. The bill was passed on the same day; 442 members of the Constituent Assembly voted for the amendment and seven voted against it. It thus became the interim constitution's Fifth Amendment. The amendment allows for the formation of a government based on a Constituent Assembly majority; it also allows the President, vice-president, Chairman of the Constituent Assembly, and the Deputy Chairman of the Constituent Assembly to be elected by majority vote if there is no consensus. In addition, the amendment provides for the Leader of the Opposition to become a member of the Constitutional Council; however, the Constituent Assembly rejected a proposal from the cabinet that the Leader of the Opposition be included on the National Defense Council.

== Presidential and vice-presidential elections ==
In a meeting with the Nepali Congress on 14 July, the CPN (M) urged it to participate in the new government. A Nepali Congress leader replied that the party had still not decided whether to participate. On 15 July the date of the presidential election was set for 19 July, while the CPN (UML) and CPN (M) failed to reach an agreement on a presidential candidate; despite the CPN (M)'s agreement to support a CPN (UML) candidate for president, it balked at the CPN (UML)'s choice of Madhav Kumar Nepal, saying that the President should be from the Terai, female, or a Janajati. In a meeting with the CPN (M) on the same day, the Nepali Congress proposed Koirala's presidential candidacy, but the CPN (M) again said that it would not support his candidacy. The CPN (M) proposed the candidacy of Ram Raja Prasad Singh on 17 July, upsetting the cooperation between the CPN (M) and CPN (UML).

The Nepali Congress, CPN (UML), and the MJF agreed on the morning of 19 July to back one another's candidates for the positions of President, vice-president, and Chairman of the Constituent Assembly, with each of the parties receiving one of the three posts. The Nepali Congress put forward Ram Baran Yadav for the presidency, while the MJF put forward Parmanand Jha for the vice-presidency; a CPN (UML) candidate was to become Chairman of the Constituent Assembly. The MJF refused to back Singh, the CPN (M) candidate for the presidency, because the CPN (M) was unwilling to support the MJF candidate for the vice-presidency. In the presidential vote held later on 19 July, neither Singh nor Yadav received the necessary 298 votes, with Singh receiving 270 and Yadav receiving 283. As a result, a second round was scheduled for 21 July. In the vice-presidential vote, also held on 19 July, MJF candidate Jha was elected with 305 votes, while CPN (M) candidate Shanta Shrestha received 243 votes.

The Nepali Congress said on 20 July that the newly formed three-party alliance was not intended to form a government.

In the second round presidential vote held in the Constituent Assembly on 21 July, Ram Baran Yadav—supported by the Nepali Congress, CPN (UML), and MJF—was elected as the first President of Nepal, receiving 308 out of 590 votes and defeating CPN (M) candidate Ram Raja Prasad Singh, who received 282 votes. Earlier, during the vice-presidential election and the first round of the presidential election, the CPN (M) had threatened to refuse to form a government if their choice for the presidency did not succeed as they feared that certain electoral pledges such as land reform would not able to pass. Yadav was sworn in on 23 July 2008, and accepted Koirala submitted his resignation to Yadav later on the same day.

== Beginning of the CA's work ==
The newly formed alliance agreed to support CPN(UML) member Subash Chandra Nemwang as Chairman of the Constituent Assembly, and he was elected to that post without opposition on 23 July 2008. Subsequently, the CPN (M) announced they would still be willing to form the government, provided the other parties would guarantee three points:

1. that the Maoists would have at least two years of work without being voted out of government,
2. that the alliance of NC-CPN(UML)-MJF was dissolved, and
3. that the Maoists would be allowed to get a "minimum program" voted through. The CPN (M) presented its proposal for a common minimum program to the other parties represented in the Constituent Assembly at a meeting on 2 August 2008. The other parties did not respond immediately, saying that they would need time to study the proposed program.

In the subsequent vote for Prime Minister, held in the Constituent Assembly on 15 August 2008, Prachanda was the CPN (M) candidate and was backed by the CPN (M)'s alliance partners, the CPN (UML) and the MPRF. A total of 20 parties supported Prachanda. The Nepali Congress presented Sher Bahadur Deuba as its candidate, but Prachanda won the vote overwhelmingly, receiving 464 votes against 113 votes for Deuba. Five hundred and seventy-seven members of the Constituent Assembly took part in the vote. Yadav congratulated Prachanda and invited him to be sworn in on 18 August. The three alliance partners held discussions regarding the composition of the new cabinet and agreed that it should include 24 portfolios. The parties had already agreed that the CPN (M) would hold nine portfolios, the CPN (UML) would hold six, and the MPRF would hold four.

Prachanda was sworn in by Yadav at the president's office on 18 August. In swearing the oath of office, he altered it slightly, taking the oath "in the name of the people" rather than "in the name of God". Among the politicians and dignitaries present were vice-president Jha, Constituent Assembly Chairman Subas Nemwang, and Deuba; Koirala was not present. The Indian and US ambassadors congratulated Prachanda on this occasion.

Eight members of the cabinet—four from the CPN (M) and four from the MJF—were sworn in on 22 August. The CPN (UML) ministers were not sworn in on this occasion; they refused to take the oath due to an unfulfilled demand that the party receive the second-ranking position in the cabinet.

== Parties ==
The following parties presented candidates ahead of the election.

Party name	No. of candidates for FPTP system	No. of candidates for PR system	Top candidate
Chure Bhawar Rastriya Ekta Party Nepal	11	43	Keshav Prasad Mainali
Communist Party of Nepal (Maoist)	240	335	Lila Devi Mehta
Communist Party of Nepal (Marxist)	4	38	Durga Prasad Gyawali
Communist Party of Nepal (Marxist-Leninist)	113	138	C.P. Mainali
Communist Party of Nepal (Unified Marxist-Leninist)	240	335	Amrit Bohara
Communist Party of Nepal (Unified)	136	335	Bishnu Bahadur Tamang
Communist Party of Nepal (United Marxist)	48	100	Hemanta Bahadur B.C.
Communist Party of Nepal (United)	55	67	Chandra Dev Joshi
Dalit Janajati Party	50	74	Biswendra Paswan
Hindu Prajatantrik Party	4	64	Bisnhu Kumar Prasai
Janamorcha Nepal	203	335	Ritakumari Sunar
Janamukti Party Nepal	3	79	Lakshmi Devi Tuladhar
Liberal Samajbadi Party	3		
League Nepal Shanti Ekta Party	10	63	Sharan Bahadur Bhandari
Lok Kalayankari Janata Party Nepal	34	100	Kishori Mehta
Madhesi Jana Adhikar Forum, Nepal	103	100	Upendra Yadav
Mongol National Organisation	17	46	Krishna Bahadur Tamang
Muskan Sena Nepal Party	34	46	Pradip Giri
Nawa Janabadi Morcha	15	38	Shankarlal Shrestha
Nawa Nepal Prajatantrik Dal	2	36	Anoop Kumar Pahari
Nepa Rastriya Party	6	73	Buddharatna Manandhar
Nepal Dalit Shramik Morcha	1	46	Roma Bishwakarma
Nepal Janabhavana Party	2	49	Ram Kishun Pasi
Nepal Janata Party	25	58	Khemnath Acharya
Nepal Loktantrik Samajbadi Dal	11	84	Tara Chandra Chauduri
Nepal Rastriya Bikas Party	13	42	Takashi Miyahara
Nepal Rastriya Janakalayan Party	3		
Nepal Rastriya Loktantrik Dal	2	36	Binod Kumar Kshetri
Nepal Sadhabhavana Party (Anandidevi)	104	76	Rakesh Kumar Gupta
Nepal Samata Party	14	35	Sakila Ranjitkar
Nepal Samyabadi Dal	1	42	Mukunda Khanal
Nepal Shanti Kshetra Parishad	3	40	Tilakbahadur Negi
Nepal Sukumbasi Party (Loktantrik)	11	58	Manju Kumari Suyal
Nepal Workers Peasants Party	98	86	Narayan Man Bijukchhe
Nepali Congress	240	335	G.P. Koirala
Nepali Congress (Rastrabadi)	0	50	Khanuparude
Nepali Janata Dal	40	99	Hari Charan Shah
Rashtrabadi Ekta Party	2	50	Chandra Maya Maharjan
Rashtrabadi Yuba Morcha	5	59	Shyam Kumar Thapa
Rastriya Bikas Party	21	38	Asarfi Shah
Rastriya Janamorcha	122	335	Santbahadur Nepali
Rastriya Janamukti Party	84	100	Urmila Kumari Nepali
Rastriya Janata Dal	8	39	Bhogendra Nath Shah Kanu
Rastriya Janata Dal Nepal	17	81	Bharat Prasad Mehta
Rastriya Janshakti Party	198	304	Shakuntala Devi
Rastriya Prajatantra Party	233	335	Lokendra Bahadur Chand
Rastriya Prajatantra Party Nepal	204	266	Bhojraj Ghimire
Sadbhavana Party	87	100	Bishwanath Singh Rajbanshi
Samajbadi Party Nepal	5	41	Mumtaz Alam
Samajbadi Prajatantrik Janata Party, Nepal	50	175	Prem Bahadur Singh
Sanghiya Loktantrik Rastriya Manch	45	100	Dev Kumar Buddhist
Sa-Shakti Nepal			
Shanti Party Nepal	12	69	Tej Prasad Upadhaya
Tamsalin Nepal Rastriya Dal	22	54	Parshuram Tamang
Terai Madhesh Loktantrik Party	94	100	Mahendra Prasad Yadav
Independents	816		

Notably, the Nepali Congress and Nepali Congress (Democratic) merged prior to the elections on 25 September 2007.

The Communist Party of Nepal (Marxist-Leninist-Maoist Centre), which had registered itself ahead of the elections and which held 1 MP, has merged into the Communist Party of Nepal (Maoist).

On the day before the filing deadline, the Rastriya Janashakti Party announced it would boycott the election, citing the fact that the government "ignored the worsening situation in the Terai plans". The Green Nepal Party had earlier also announced a boycott, demanding that a neutral caretaker government supervise the polls.

Of the 74 registered political parties, 38 submitted closed candidate lists for the proportional representation by the deadline of 20 February 2008. The deadline for filing for the FPTP seats is 25 February 2008.

== Results ==
Party	Proportional			Constituency			Seats	
Party	Votes	%	Seats	Votes	%	Seats	Nominated	Total
Communist Party of Nepal (Maoist)	3,144,204	29.28	100	3,145,519	30.52	120	9	229
Nepali Congress	2,269,883	21.14	73	2,348,890	22.79	37	5	115
Communist Party of Nepal (Unified Marxist-Leninist)	2,183,370	20.33	70	2,229,064	21.63	33	5	108
Madheshi Jana Adhikar Forum, Nepal	678,327	6.32	22	634,154	6.15	30	2	54
Terai Madhesh Loktantrik Party	338,930	3.16	11	345,587	3.35	9	1	21
Rastriya Prajatantra Party	263,431	2.45	8	310,214	3.01	0	0	8
Communist Party of Nepal (Marxist–Leninist)	243,545	2.27	8	168,196	1.63	0	1	9
Sadbhavana Party	167,517	1.56	5	174,086	1.69	4	0	9
Janamorcha Nepal	164,381	1.53	5	136,846	1.33	2	1	8
Communist Party of Nepal (United)	154,968	1.44	5	39,100	0.38	0	0	5
Rastriya Prajatantra Party Nepal	110,519	1.03	4	76,684	0.74	0	0	4
Rastriya Janamorcha	106,224	0.99	3	93,578	0.91	1	0	4
Rastriya Janshakti Party	102,147	0.95	3	79,925	0.78	0	0	3
Nepal Workers Peasants Party	74,089	0.69	2	65,908	0.64	2	1	5
Sanghiya Loktantrik Rastriya Manch	71,958	0.67	2	36,060	0.35	0	0	2
Nepal Sadbhavana Party (Anandidevi)	55,671	0.52	2	45,254	0.44	0	1	3
Rastriya Janamukti Party	53,910	0.50	2	38,568	0.37	0	0	2
Nepali Janata Dal	48,990	0.46	2	17,162	0.17	0	0	2
Communist Party of Nepal (Unified)	48,600	0.45	2	51,928	0.50	0	0	2
Dalit Janajati Party	40,348	0.38	1	31,444	0.31	0	0	1
Nepa Rastriya Party	37,757	0.35	1	11,352	0.11	0	0	1
Samajbadi Prajatantrik Janata Party	35,752	0.33	1	13,246	0.13	0	0	1
Chure Bhawar Rastriya Ekta Party Nepal	28,575	0.27	1	18,908	0.18	0	0	1
Nepal Loktantrik Samajbadi Dal	25,022	0.23	1	10,432	0.10	0	0	1
Nepal Pariwar Dal	23,512	0.22	1				0	1
Communist Party of Nepal (Marxist)	21,234	0.20	0	1,759	0.02	0	0	0
Tamsaling Nepal Rastriya Dal	20,657	0.19	0	5,468	0.05	0	0	0
Rastriya Janata Dal	19,305	0.18	0	5,556	0.05	0	0	0
Communist Party of Nepal (United Marxist)	18,717	0.17	0	10,076	0.10	0	0	0
Lok Kalyankari Janta Party Nepal	18,123	0.17	0	6,700	0.07	0	0	0
Nepal Janabhavana Party	13,173	0.12	0	104	0.00	0	0	0
Rastriya Janata Dal Nepal	12,678	0.12	0	4,497	0.04	0	0	0
Nepal Janata Party	12,531	0.12	0	5,635	0.05	0	0	0
Mongol National Organisation	11,578	0.11	0	6,349	0.06	0	0	0
Nepal Shanti Kshetra Parishad	10,565	0.10	0	45	0.00	0	0	0
Shanti Party Nepal	10,511	0.10	0	970	0.01	0	0	0
Rastriya Bikas Party	9,329	0.09	0	2,612	0.03	0	0	0
Nepal Sukumbasi Party (Loktantrik)	8,322	0.08	0	1,459	0.01	0	0	0
Nepal Rastriya Bikas Party	8,026	0.07	0	1,603	0.02	0	0	0
Nepal Dalit Shramik Morcha	7,107	0.07	0	93	0.00	0	0	0
Samajbadi Party Nepal	6,564	0.06	0	1,197	0.01	0	0	0
Muskan Sena Nepal Party	6,292	0.06	0	2,490	0.02	0	0	0
Nepali Congress (Rastrabadi)	5,721	0.05	0				0	0
Nepal Samyabadi Dal	5,478	0.05	0	60	0.00	0	0	0
Nawa Janabadi Morcha	5,193	0.05	0	992	0.01	0	0	0
Hindu Prajatantrik Party	4,902	0.05	0	265	0.00	0	0	0
Nepal Samata Party	4,697	0.04	0	459	0.00	0	0	0
Rastrabadi Yuba Morcha	4,772	0.04	0	496	0.00	0	0	0
League Nepal Shanti Ekta Party	4,443	0.04	0	316	0.00	0	0	0
Rastrabadi Ekta Party	4,150	0.04	0	43	0.00	0	0	0
Sa-Shakti Nepal	3,752	0.03	0	532	0.01	0	0	0
Janamukti Party Nepal	3,396	0.03	0	281	0.00	0	0	0
Nepal Rastriya Loktantrik Dal	3,216	0.03	0	57	0.00	0	0	0
Nawa Nepal Prajatantrik Dal	3,016	0.03	0	34	0.00	0	0	0
Liberal Samajbadi Party				152	0.00	0	0	0
Nepal Rastriya Janakalayan Party				96	0.00	0	0	0
Independents				123,619	1.20	2	0	2
Total	10,739,078	100.00	335	10,306,120	100.00	240	26	601
Valid votes	10,739,078	96.34		10,306,120	94.85			
Invalid/blank votes	407,462	3.66		560,011	5.15			
Total votes	11,146,540	100.00		10,866,131	100.00			
Registered voters/turnout	17,611,832	63.29		17,611,832	61.70			
Source: Election Commission Nepal News, Kantipur Online, Kantipur Online, Psephos

== See also ==
- List of members elected in the 2008 Nepalese Constituent Assembly election
