= Election Commission (Nepal) =

Election regulatory body of Nepal

Election Commission of Nepal
- निर्वाचन आयोग नेपाल

Agency overview
- Formed: 12 November 1951; 74 years ago
- Jurisdiction: Nepal
- Headquarters: Kantipath, Kathmandu, Nepal
- Agency executives: Man Bahadur Karki, Chief Election Commissioner of Nepal; Hon. Sagun Shumsher J.B. Rana, Election Commissioner
- Website: https://election.gov.np/en

The Election Commission, Nepal (Nepali: निर्वाचन आयोग, नेपाल; Nirvācana āyōg, Nēpāl) is a constitutional body responsible for conducting and monitoring elections, as well as registering parties and candidates and reporting election outcomes, in Nepal. It was born out of the 1950 revolution in Nepal, and was established in law in 1951, although it has been changed somewhat by law over time. It has six election commissioners including one chief election commissioner who serve for six-year terms, as established by the Constitution of Nepal. During the Constituent Assembly elections in 2008, it was criticized for not fully upholding its duties, but was acknowledged to have managed the elections well nonetheless.

The first election commissioner was Subarna Shamsher Rana in 1951.

== History ==
The year 1950 was important in the history of Nepal: in that year, the Rana dynasty, which had controlled the government for exactly 104 years, was overthrown. The coup d'état marked Nepal's first attempt at democracy; one of the primary goals of the revolution was to eventually establish the Nepalese Constituent Assembly. The democratic experiment was short-lived; in less than ten years, King Mahendra dissolved the government in favor of the Panchayat system. However, another major accomplishment was the establishment of the National Election Commission in 1951.

The commission was declared by law to be independent of the government in 1966. This has been confirmed by Nepal's interim constitution in 2007.

== Composition ==
It has five members, consisting of the Chief Election Commissioner and four others. The members serve for 6 years. In order to enforce its election guidelines, the commission employs a group of around 240,000 officials, mostly civil servants, to monitor elections.

When the commission was established, the members were chosen by the King. In 1989, King Birendra's constitution declared that the Chief Election Commissioner would still be appointed by the king, but the others would not. The interim constitution further amended the body's composition in 2006: all five members were made under appointment of the Prime Minister. The new constitution of Nepal has made the provision of appointment of chief election commission and other members by the president on the recommendation of constitutional members

== Criticism ==
The commission came under some criticism during the Constituent Assembly elections for failing to enforce the code of conduct during elections. It also failed to fully educate voters about the election. However, it was acknowledged to have helped the elections run smoothly overall. The commissions role was highly criticized in 2021 is being criticized for no decision in Nepal Communist Party and People's Socialist Party, Nepal dispute. However, Supreme Court took decision to re-establish Maoist-Centre and UML, commission gave no decision though signature of majority central committee members were submitted time and again by a faction. Same is the case for PSP-N.

== See also ==
- Chief Election Commissioner of Nepal
