= 2021 split in the People's Socialist Party, Nepal =

- Date: May to July 2021
- Location: Nepal
- Type: Party and parliamentary political dispute
- Cause: Ideological differences amongst leadership
- Participants: People's Socialist Party, Nepal (PSP-N)
- Outcome: Split in PSP-N: Changes in central government, Province No. 2 and Lumbini Province; Upendra Yadav faction gains party authority; Mahantha Thakur faction forms new party Loktantrik Samajwadi Party, Nepal; Resham Lal Chaudhary forms new party People's Freedom Party

The 2021 split in the People's Socialist Party, Nepal (PSP-N) was a factional dispute amongst the leadership over party control beginning in May and culminating in July, with the faction led by former Deputy Prime Minister Upendra Yadav succeeding over the faction of former First Chairman Mahantha Thakur. The dispute was settled as a result of a decision of the Election Commission, which handed control to Yadav's faction, forcing the departure of the Thakur faction from the PSP-N and requiring the formation of a new party.

== Background ==
With 34 among 275 seats in the lower house House of Representatives and 3 among 59 seats in the upper house National Assembly, the party was born as the third-largest political party in the Federal Parliament after the Nepal Communist Party and the Nepali Congress and it was one of four national party of the country prior to split.

After the dissolution of parliament, a faction led by Upendra Yadav stood in support of Sher Bahadur Deuba of Nepali Congress while faction led by Mahantha Thakur stood in support of the then minority Prime minister of Nepal KP Oli from UML. The decision of dissolution of parliament was being challenged in the Supreme Court of Nepal. Meanwhile, Yadav led faction on 1 June 2021 expelled Mahantha Thakur, Rajendra Mahato, Laxman Lal Karna and Sharvendra Nath Shukla from even member of the party for going against party decision by a majority(31 of 51) of executive committee as per the constitution of the party. On the other hand, Mahantha Thakur who claimed to be number one president of party expelled Upendra Yadav with no majority in any committee recognized by Election Commission of Nepal.

This had brought instability in government of province no. 2 where Yadav led faction got support of legislators from Nepali Congress, CPN(Maoist-Centre), UML(Madhav faction) and few legislators from RJP-N which existed before party merger when the other faction within party opposed the government being led by Yadav faction. Hence, a group of ministers including Sonal were expelled as a result. Previously, similar was seen in Lumbini Province. To earlier, FSF-N and RJP-N had formed alliance in provincial and parliamentary election of 2017 as a pro-madhesh alliance alleging Nepali Congress, CPN-UML and other national parties of not respecting to votes of the region for years. This alliance got majority (54/107) in provincial election leading to formation of government led by Mohammad Lal Babu Raut Gaddi. 11 ministers from this party from Mahantha Thakur faction joined Second Oli cabinet including Rajkishor Yadav in second lot. Though Yadav was included in the second lot he was removed from the post of minister in just 9 days following Supreme Court decision. After these circumstances, he is not joining any meeting of Mahantha Thakur faction due to dissatisfactions.

After months long dispute, Election Commission of Nepal called both the factions for discussion to find if there was any possibility of staying together on 6 July 2021 but no such possibility was seen. Both the factions decided to part ways in the form agreement as per the law. ECI, Nepal asked both the factions to apply for registration of new party.

Lastly, both the factions decided to split with common interest than fighting under common roof. The new parties may be formed on the base of these factions. Leaders including Bimal Shrivasatav, Umashankar Argariya from Ex Samajbadi Party, Nepal sided President Mahantha Thakur from Ex RJP-N. They played role in choosing Rajendra Mahato as Parliamentary party leader and joined Oli led government. Similarly, presidium members of Ex RJP-N Mahendra Raya Yadav and Rajkishor Yadav sided President Upendra Yadav from Ex SP-N.

== Signature session by Election Commission ==
On 26 July 2021, Election Commission took signatures of all 51 central executive committee members to clear their stand. Here came a huge setback to Mahantha-Rajendra faction when Manish Suman and Rajkishor Yadav joined Upendra Yadav faction of the party at last moment who were previously from Mahantha Thakur faction. Almost all the leaders from Sadbhawana Party background including Mrigendra Singh Yadav, Nawal Kishor Sah Sudi and Manish Suman joined Upendra Yadav faction who held Sadbhawana background. Exception were only Anil Jha and Rajendra Mahato. As a result, Rajendra Mahato became alone. Still almost all from Democratic or Terai Madhesh Loktantrik Party remained in Mahantha Thakur faction. This faction had Dr. Surendra Jha and Dr. Keshav Jha as two important youth pillars. Very unexpected, 34 of total 51 executive committee members sided in Upendra Yadav faction which meant this faction was leading the real party. Only 16 of them sided Mahantha Thakur.

Still, the core leader of far-west in the party, Resham Chaudhary also reached EC from Jail who is in for Tikapur violence case. He did not side anyone and remained neutral.

== Mahantha Thakur Faction ==
This faction contained mainly people from democratic background. Mahatha Thakur and Sarat Singh Bhandari hold Nepali Congress background. Similarly, Anil Jha and Rajendra Mahato hold Sadbhawana background which was also a Terai-based democratic party in the 1990s. None here holds communist background.

Major leaders: Mahantha Thakur, Anil Jha, Sarat Singh Bhandari, Rajendra Mahato, Laxman Lal Karna, Umakanta Jha, Jitendra Prasad Sonal, Umashankar Argariya Yadav, Bimal Prasad Shrivastava, Chanda Chaudhary, Brikhesh Chandra Lal, Sharvendra Nath Shukla, Chandra Kant Chaudhary, Dr. Surendra Jha, Dr. Keshav Jha.

== Upendra Yadav Faction ==
This faction neither is purely a democratic background nor communist background. It appears to be a big tent faction. Upendra Yadav, Ashok Rai and Rajendra Prasad Shrestha hold CPN(UML) background while Baburam Bhattarai holds CPN(Maoist) background. So, people from communist background hold clear majority here. Still, some from democratic background or Sadbhawana are also present here including Mrigendra Singh Yadav, Raj Kishor Yadav, Manish Suman and Nawal Kishor Sah Sudi.

Major leaders: Upendra Yadav, Baburam Bhattarai, Raj Kishor Yadav, Mrigendra Singh Yadav, Rajendra Prasad Shrestha, Ashok Rai, Mahendra Raya Yadav, Manish Suman.

== Second split ==
In December, central working committee member Mangal Prasad Gupta joined CPN (UML). Followed by this, Resham Lal Chaudhary split the party to form Nagrik Unmukti Party.

== Result of Election Commission and aftermath ==
Upendra Yadav's faction got the authority of the party. Previously, This party had following strength in assemblies. Now, Mahantha Thakur led faction has to register a new party. The other faction was in talk with advocates to form a new party or next move while it formed the Loktantrik Samajbadi Party on 18 August 2021. Later, Reaham Lal Chaudhary broke to form Nagrik Unmukti Party.

=== Changes in legislatures ===
Party	Parliament	Seats	Faction	Seats
Nepal Communist Party	National Assembly	3 / 59	PSP-N	2 / 59
Nepal Communist Party	National Assembly	3 / 59	LSP-N	1 / 59
Nepal Communist Party	National Assembly	3 / 59	Nagrik Unmukti Party	0 / 59
Nepal Communist Party	House of Representatives	34 / 275	PSP-N	20 / 275
Nepal Communist Party	House of Representatives	34 / 275	LSP-N	13 / 275
Nepal Communist Party	House of Representatives	34 / 275	Nagrik Unmukti Party	1 / 275
Nepal Communist Party	Provincial Assembly	69 / 550	PSP-N	48 / 550
Nepal Communist Party	Provincial Assembly	69 / 550	LSP-N	16 / 550
Nepal Communist Party	Provincial Assembly	69 / 550	Nagrik Unmukti Party	2 / 550

== See also ==
- 2021-2022 split in Nepalese Communist Parties
- 2024 split in the People's Socialist Party, Nepal
- Nepali Congress, Madhesh Province
