= Renu Kumari Yadav =

Indian born Nepali politician

- रेनु कुमारी यादव

Joint chairman of People's Socialist Party
- Incumbent
- Assumed office 5 May 2024
- Preceded by: position established

Minister for Physical Infrastructure and Transportation
- In office 8 October 2021 – 4 July 2022
- President: Bidhya Devi Bhandari
- Prime Minister: Sher Bahadur Deuba
- Preceded by: Basanta Kumar Nembwang
- Succeeded by: Mohammad Estiyak Rai

Minister for Education
- In office 2008–2009
- President: Ram Baran Yadav
- Prime Minister: Pushpa Kamal Dahal

Minister for Women, Children and Social Affairs
- In office 2003–2004
- Monarch: Birendra of Nepal
- Prime Minister: Surya Bahadur Thapa

Member of Parliament, Pratinidhi Sabha
- In office 4 March 2018 – 2023
- In office May 1999 – May 2002
- Preceded by: Anis Ansari
- Succeeded by: Mahesh Prasad Yadav
- Constituency: Saptari 3

Member of Constituent Assembly
- In office 28 May 2008 – 28 May 2012
- Preceded by: Jagadish Prasad Sah
- Succeeded by: Tara Kanta Chaudhary
- Constituency: Saptari 4

Personal details
- Born: January 16, 1959 (age 67) Forbesganj, Bihar, India
- Party: People's Socialist Party
- Other party: Nepali Congress; Rastriya Prajatantra Party; Rastriya Janashakti Party; Madhesi Jana Adhikar Forum, Nepal; Federal Socialist Forum, Nepal; Samajbadi Party, Nepal; People's Socialist Party, Nepal

Renu Kumari Yadav (Nepali: रेणु कुमारी यादव) (born 16 January 1959) is a Nepali politician and member of House of Representatives on proportional representation.

She most recently served as the Minister for Physical Infrastructure and Transportation of Nepal in the ruling coalition government led by Prime Minister and Nepali Congress President Sher Bahadur Deuba. Recently, Yadav resigned from the People's Socialist Party, Nepal.

== Personal life ==
Yadav was born on June 19, 1963, in Forbesganj, India to Rameshwor Prasad and Chintamani Devi Yadav. She belongs to the Ahir community.

== Political life ==
Yadav was elected as a Rastriya Prajatantra Party (RPP) candidate to the Pratinidhi Sabha in the 1999 election from the Saptari 3 constituency. In 2002 she was elected to the central committee of the RPP.

In June 2003, she was named Minister for Women, Children and Social Affairs in the Surya Bahadur Thapa-led cabinet appointed by King Gyanendra. When the RPP was divided and Thapa broke away and formed the Rastriya Janshakti Party, Yadav joined the new RJP.

In February 2008 she resigned from the parliament and left RJP, in support of the Madhesi agitation.

In April 2008, she won the Saptari 4 seat in the Constituent Assembly election as a Madhesi Janadhikar Forum candidate. In late May 2008, she was included in the central committee of MJF. She was subsequently appointed as Minister of Education and sworn in on August 22, 2008.

== Controversies ==
- Leading party split: As per trusted sources and national media's, Yadav wanted to split the with seven other MPs which included Bimal Prasad Shrivastav, Surendra Kumar Yadav, Mohammad Estiyak Rai, Pradeep Yadav, Umashankar Argariya, Kalu Devi Bishwakarma and Renuka Gurung. Though the plan went unsuccess do to last moment merger of Samajbadi Party, Nepal and Rastriya Janata Party Nepal to form People's Socialist Party, Nepal it was highly covered by national medias.
- Gaur incident: Minister Yadav was shown black flag in Gaur, Rautahat on 20 January 2021 by farmers and party cadets of Janamat party led by CK Raut. After this incident, she said not to make a challenge else Raut and fellow farmers would be killed and that the incident of Gaur Rice mill would repeat when her party workers with Upendra Yadav present killed 28 Maoist workers led by Prabhu Sah trying to organize program on same field of rice mill.

== Electoral history ==
=== 2013 Constituent Assembly election ===
Saptari 4
Party	Candidate	Votes
CPN (Unified Marxist–Leninist)	Tara Kanta Chaudhary	8,217
Nepali Congress	Dinesh Kumar Yadav	6,985
Madheshi Janaadhikar Forum, Nepal (Democratic)	Satya Narayan Yadav	4,384
Sadbhavana Party	Jismul Khan	4,141
Madhesi Jana Adhikar Forum, Nepal	Renu Kumari Yadav	3,007
Independent	Surya Narayan Mandal	1,533
Rastriya Madhesh Samajbadi Party	Gajendra Kumar Mandal	1,515
Terai Madhesh Loktantrik Party	Puspa Thakur	1,005
Others		5,996
Result	CPN (UML) gain	
Source: NepalNews

=== 2008 Constituent Assembly election ===
Saptari 4
Party	Candidate	Votes
Madhesi Jana Adhikar Forum, Nepal	Renu Kumari Yadav	12,681
Nepal Sadbhavana Party (Anandidevi)	Jismul Khan	7,590
Nepali Congress	Dinesh Kumar Yadav	6,070
Sadbhavana Party	Satya Narayan Yadav	5,344
CPN (Unified Marxist–Leninist)	Jagadish Prasad Sah	5,254
CPN (Maoist)	Chhedi Safi	2,899
Terai Madhesh Loktantrik Party	Surendra Narayan Mandal	2,536
Dalit Janajati Party	Jagajiwan Ram	1,966
Others		4,678
Invalid votes		2,974
Result	MJFN gain	
Source: Election Commission

=== 1999 legislative elections ===
Saptari 3
Party	Candidate	Votes
Rastriya Prajatantra Party	Renu Kumari Yadav	17,231
CPN (Unified Marxist–Leninist)	Suman Raj Pyakurel	10,910
Nepali Congress	Anis Ansari	10,803
Nepal Sadbhawana Party	Surya Narayan Mandal	10,126
Others		2,699
Invalid Votes		1,914
Result	RPP gain	
Source: Election Commission

=== 1994 legislative elections ===
Saptari 3
Party	Candidate	Votes
Nepal Sadbhawana Party	Anis Ansari	12,743
Independent	Surya Narayan Mandal	8,921
Rastriya Prajatantra Party	Renu Kumari Yadav	6,411
Nepali Congress	Dev Narayan Yadav	5,431
CPN (Unified Marxist–Leninist)	Jaya Krishna Goit	5,367
Independent	Shiva Prasad Pokharel	2,590
Others		999
Result	NSP gain	
Source: Election Commission

== See also ==
- People's Socialist Party
