= United Democratic Madhesi Front =

United Democratic Madhesi Front संयुक्त लोकतान्त्रिक मधेसी मोर्चा
- Abbreviation: UDMF
- Leader: Mahantha Thakur
- Founder: TMLP; MJFN; Sadbhavana
- Ideology: Madhesi rights Federalism
- Political position: Centre-left

United Democratic Madhesi Front (Nepali: संयुक्त लोकतान्त्रिक मधेसी मोर्चा, transliteration: Samyukta Loktantrik Madhesi Morcha) was a political alliance of Madhesh-based political parties in Nepal created for the Madhes Movement. It was formed in 2008 by Madhesi Jana Adhikar Forum, Nepal, Nepal Sadbhavana Party and Terai Madhes Loktantrik Party.

== History ==
=== Madhesh Movement II (2007–08) ===
On 17 December 2007, Madhesi Jana Adhikar Forum, Nepal led by Upendra Yadav and Nepal Sadbhvana Party led by Rajendra Mahato announced a protest programme with a nine-point demand. The two parties announced three-week long joint agitation in the Terai region starting from 26 December. The two-party alliance was initially known as the United Madhesi Front and called for the government to implement the 22-point demand that had been signed with MJFN in the first Madhesh movement.

On 9 February 2008, the Terai Madhesh Loktantrik Party joined the United Madhesi Front and the United Democratic Madhesi Front was formed. The front wanted the government to declare an autonomous Madhesh province in the Terai region of Nepal. The front also wanted the Election Commission Act be amended to increase inclusiveness of Madhesis, Janajatis and Dalits in state organs including the Nepal Army.

On February 28, 2008, UDMF signed an 8-point deal with the government of Nepal, ending a 16-day general strike in the Tarai areas. The government and the front agreed to establish a federal democratic republic, declare an autonomous Madhesh, ensure proportional representation for marginalised communities in Nepal Army, declare the people killed in the agitation as martyrs and provide free medical treatment to the injured. Through signing the deal, the UDMF agreed to participate in the Constituent Assembly election. In June 2008, the three parties agreed to revive the front, following the holding of the election.

=== Madhesh Movement III (2015–16) ===
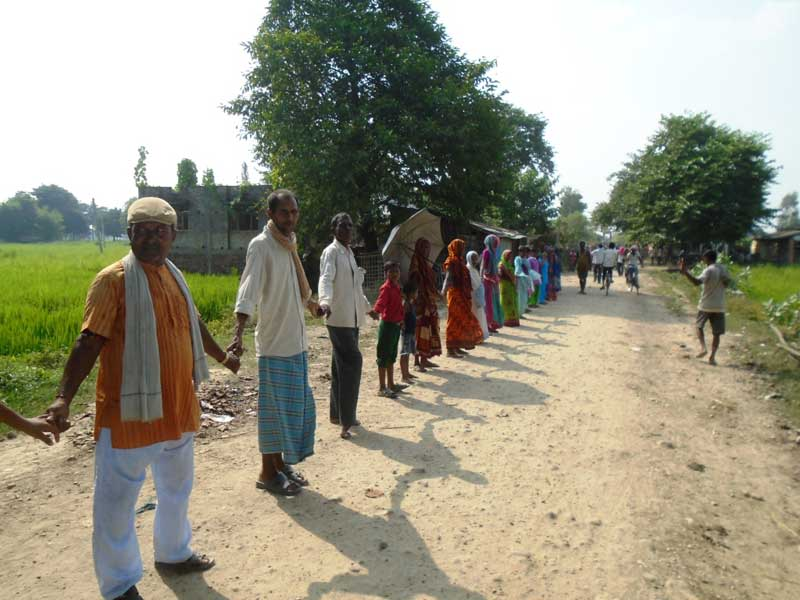
Supporters of the front protesting against the constitution by forming a human chain

The UDMF was reformed by Madhesi Janaadhikar Forum, Nepal, Madhesi Janaadhikar Forum (Republican), Madhesi Janaadhikar Forum, Nepal (Democratic), Nepal Sadbhawna Party, Rastriya Madhesh Samajbadi Party, Sadbhawana Party, Terai Madhesh Loktantrik Party and Terai Madhesh Sadbhavana Party. The alliance was formed against the proposed province demarcation by the major political parties. The alliance said that the proposed demarcation violated the previous agreements that had been signed between them during the first and second Madhesh movement that ensured a single Madhesh province.

Forum Democratic was expelled from the alliance on 15 June 2015 after the party signed an agreement with the government. The Madhesi Janaadhikar Forum, Nepal later merged with Federal Socialist Party, Nepal and Khas Samabeshi Party to form Federal Socialist Forum, Nepal but stayed on as a member of the front. The prolonged agitation in the Terai region that borders India also led to the 2015 Nepal blockade, the UDMF offered to lift the blockade only after their demands for constitution amendment was made.

=== Elections (2017) ===
In early 2017, the alliance also protested the Local Level Restructuring Commission Report and the Constituency Delimitation Commission report accusing them of bias. The alliance also announced a boycott of the 2017 local, general and provincial elections until their demands for constitutional amendment was met. FSFN however contested the local elections though still demanded constitution amendment be made before the second phase of local elections. Six of the seven constituents of the alliance, barring Federal Socialist Forum, Nepal, later merged to form the Rastriya Janata Party Nepal on 21 April 2017. The constituents of RJPN which had boycotted the first two phases of the local election later participated in the third phase of local elections.

== Electoral performance ==
The parties did not have an electoral alliance for the 2008 and 2013 Constituent Assembly elections but the Federal Socialist Forum, Nepal and Rastriya Janata Party Nepal had an electoral alliance for the 2017 general and provincial elections.

=== Legislative elections ===
Election	Votes			Seats		Resulting government
Election	#	%	+/-	#	+/-	Resulting government
2008	1,184,774	11.04	—	81 / 575	—	Maoist–UML–MJFN–Sadbhavana–JMN–CPN (United)
2013	1,005,168	10.62	▼0.42	49 / 575	▼32	Congress–UML
2017	942,455	9.88	▼0.74	33 / 275	▼16	UML–Maoist

=== Provincial elections ===
Province	Election	Votes		Seats	Resulting government
Province	Election	#	%	#	Resulting government
Province No. 1	2017	127,818	7.36	4 / 93	UML–Maoist
Province No. 2	2017	602,596	39.2	54 / 107	FSFN–RJPN
Province No. 5	2017	132,677	8.23	6 / 87	UML–Maoist

== See also ==
- Madhes Movement
- Madheshi people
- People's Socialist Party, Nepal
