= Madhav Kumar Nepal cabinet =

Government of Nepal from 2009 to 2011

- Cabinet of Nepal
- May 2009–February 2011
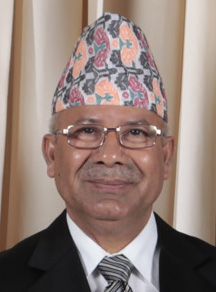
- Date formed: 23 May 2009
- Date dissolved: 6 February 2011

People and organisations
- President: Ram Baran Yadav
- Prime Minister: Madhav Kumar Nepal
- Deputy Prime Minister: Bijay Kumar Gachhadar
- Total no. of members: 44 appointments
- Member party: CPN (UML); Congress; MFJN (Loktantrik); TMLP; TMLP Nepal; Sadbhavana; RPP; CPN (United); Janashakti; Samajbadi Janata
- Status in legislature: Minority (coalition)
- Opposition party: UCPN (Maoist)
- Opposition leader: Pushpa Kamal Dahal

History
- Election: 2008
- Legislature term: 2008–2012
- Predecessor: First Dahal cabinet
- Successor: Khanal cabinet

The Madhav Kumar Nepal cabinet was formed on 23 May 2009 after Madhav Kumar Nepal of the CPN (UML) was appointed as prime minister. His candidacy was supported by twenty of twenty five parties in the 1st Constituent Assembly. He took office with a three-member cabinet on 25 May 2009. Eight ministers were added from Nepali Congress and MJFN (Loktantrik) on 4 June.

The cabinet was expanded four more times on 11 June, 24 June, 3 September and 11 September.

== Election of the Prime Minister ==
Absolute majority (301/601) required
Constituent Assembly
Candidate's Name	Party	Votes
Madhav Kumar Nepal	CPN (UML)	Unopposed

== Cabinet ==
Portfolio	Minister	Party	Took office	Left office
Prime Minister of Nepal	Madhav Kumar Nepal	CPN (UML)	25 May 2009	6 February 2011
Deputy Prime Minister of Nepal Minister for Physical Planning and Works	Bijay Kumar Gachhadar	MFJN (Loktantrik)	4 June 2009	6 February 2011
Minister for Women, Children and Senior Citizens	Bijay Kumar Gachhadar	MFJN (Loktantrik)	24 June 2009	3 September 2009
Minister for Defence	Bidya Devi Bhandari	CPN (UML)	25 May 2009	6 February 2011
Minister for Foreign Affairs	Sujata Koirala	Congress	4 June 2009	6 February 2011
Minister for Tourism and Civil Aviation	Sharat Singh Bhandari	MFJN (Loktantrik)	24 June 2009	6 February 2011
Minister for Home Affairs	Bhim Bahadur Rawal	CPN (UML)	17 June 2009	6 February 2011
Minister for Finance	Surendra Pandey	CPN (UML)	25 May 2009	6 February 2011
Minister for Energy	Prakash Sharan Mahat	Congress	17 June 2009 (Note: Appointed on 4 June 2009 without any portfolio)	6 February 2011
Minister for Irrigation	Bal Krishna Khand	Congress	17 June 2009	6 February 2011
Minister for Information and Communications	Shankar Pokharel	CPN (UML)	17 June 2009	6 February 2011
Minister for Constituent Assembly, Federal Affairs, Parliamentary System and Culture	Minendra Rijal	Congress	17 June 2009	6 February 2011
Minister for Peace and Reconstruction	Rakam Chemjong	CPN (UML)	17 June 2009	6 February 2011
Minister for Commerce and Supply	Rajendra Mahato	Sadbhavana	4 July 2009	6 February 2011
Minister for Local Development	Purna Kumar Serma Limbu	Congress	17 June 2009	6 February 2011
Minister for Health and Population	Umakant Chaudhary	Congress	17 June 2009	6 February 2011
Minister for Labour and Transportation Management	Mohammad Aftab Alam	Congress	17 June 2009	6 February 2011
Minister for General Administration	Prabhakar Pradhananga	CPN (UML)	17 June 2009	6 February 2011
Minister for Land Reform and Management	Damber Shrestha	CPN (UML)	4 June 2009 17 June 2009	6 February 2011
Minister for Education	Ram Chandra Kushwaha	TMLP	24 June 2009	6 February 2011
Minister for Forests and Soil Conservation	Deepak Bohara	RPP	24 June 2009	6 February 2011
Minister for Industry	Mahindra Ray Yadav	TMLP Nepal	24 June 2009	6 February 2011
Minister for Agriculture and Cooperatives	Mrigendra Kumar Singh Yadav	MFJN (Loktantrik)	24 June 2009	6 February 2011
Minister for Youth and Sports	Ganesh Tiwari Nepali	TMLP	24 June 2009	6 February 2011
Minister for Environment	Thakur Sharma	CPN (United)	29 July 2009	6 February 2011
Minister without portfolio	Laxman Lal Karna	Sadbhavana	3 September 2009	6 February 2011
Minister for Women, Children and Senior Citizens	Sarbadev Ojha	MFJN (Loktantrik)	3 September 2009	6 February 2011
Minister for Law and Justice	Prem Bahadur Singh	Samajbadi Janata	4 July 2009	6 February 2011
Ministers of State
Minister of State for Local Development	Ganesh Bahadur Khadka	Congress	17 June 2009	6 February 2011
Minister of State for Peace and Reconstruction	Dilli Bahadur Mahat	CPN (UML)	17 June 2009	6 February 2011
Minister of State for General Administration	Jit Bahadur Darji Gautam	CPN (UML)	17 June 2009	6 February 2011
Minister of State for Energy	Chandra Singh Bhattarai	Congress	17 June 2009	6 February 2011
Minister of State for Home Affairs	Mohammad Rizwan Ansari	CPN (UML)	17 June 2009	6 February 2011
Minister of State for Health and Population	Khadga Bahadur Basyal Sarki	Congress	17 June 2009	6 February 2011
Minister of State for Industry	Dan Bahadur Kurmi	TMLP Nepal	24 June 2009	6 February 2011
Minister of State for Land Reform and Management	Man Bahadur Shahi	Congress	24 June 2009	6 February 2011
Minister of State for Science and Technology	Indra Prasad Dhungel	Janashakti	3 September 2009	6 February 2011
Minister of State for Physical Planning and Works	Sanjay Kumar Sah	MFJN (Loktantrik)	3 September 2009	6 February 2011
Minister of State for Women, Children and Senior Citizens	Ram Bachhan Ahir	MFJN (Loktantrik)	3 September 2009	6 February 2011
Minister of State for Agriculture and Cooperatives	Karima Begam	MFJN (Loktantrik)	3 September 2009	6 February 2011
Minister of State for Tourism and Civil Aviation	Shatrughan Singh Koiri	MFJN (Loktantrik)	3 September 2009	6 February 2011
Minister of State for Commerce and Supplies	Saroj Kumar Yadav	Sadbhavana	3 September 2009	6 February 2011
Minister of State for Education	Govinda Chaudhary	TMLP Nepal	11 September 2009	6 February 2011
Assistant Ministers
Assistant Minister for Physical Planning and Works	Kalawati Devi Dusadh	MFJN (Loktantrik)	3 September 2009	6 February 2011
Assistant Minister for Youth and Sports	Chanda Chaudhary	TMLP	11 September 2009	6 February 2011
