= Madhesi Janadhikar Forum =

Madhesi Janadhikar Forum (or Madhesi Jana Adhikar Forum; transl. Madhesi People's Rights Forum) may refer to several political parties in Nepal:

- Madheshi Jana Adhikar Forum, Nepal
- Madheshi Jana Adhikar Forum, Nepal (Loktantrik)
- Madhesi Janadhikar Forum Madhesh
- Madheshi Jana Adhikar Forum, Nepal (Republican)
