= Upendra Yadav =

Nepali politician (born 1961)

Honourable Upendra Yadav
- उपेन्द्र यादव
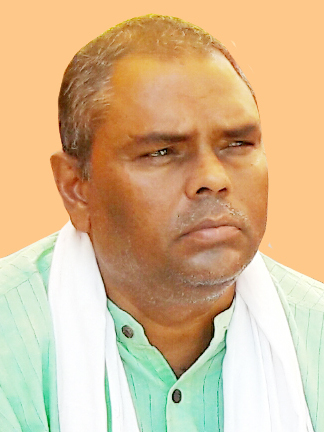
- Yadav in 2017

Deputy Prime Minister of Nepal
- In office 10 March 2024 – 13 May 2024 Serving with Narayan Kaji Shrestha and Rabi Lamichhane
- President: Ram Chandra Paudel
- Prime Minister: Pushpa Kamal Dahal
- Preceded by: Purna Bahadur Khadka
- In office 1 June 2018 – 24 December 2019 Serving with Ishwar Pokhrel
- President: Bidya Devi Bhandari
- Prime Minister: K. P. Sharma Oli
- Preceded by: Bimalendra Nidhi
- Succeeded by: Bishnu Prasad Paudel; Raghubir Mahaseth

Minister of Health and Population
- In office 10 March 2024 – 13 May 2024
- President: Ram Chandra Poudel
- Prime Minister: Pushpa Kamal Dahal
- Preceded by: Mohan Bahadur Basnet
- Succeeded by: Pradeep Yadav
- In office 1 June 2018 – 20 November 2019
- President: Bidya Devi Bhandari
- Prime Minister: K. P. Sharma Oli
- Preceded by: K. P. Sharma Oli as Prime Minister
- Succeeded by: Bhanu Bhakta Dhakal

Minister of Foreign Affairs
- In office 4 May 2011 – 29 August 2011
- President: Ram Baran Yadav
- Prime Minister: Jhala Nath Khanal
- Preceded by: Bishnu Prasad Paudel
- Succeeded by: Narayan Kaji Shrestha
- In office 18 August 2008 – 25 May 2009
- President: Ram Baran Yadav
- Prime Minister: Pushpa Kamal Dahal
- Preceded by: Sahana Pradhan
- Succeeded by: Sujata Koirala

Minister of Law, Justice and Parliamentary Affairs
- In office 21 November 2019 – 24 December 2019
- President: Bidya Devi Bhandari
- Prime Minister: K. P. Sharma Oli
- Preceded by: Bhanu Bhakta Dhakal
- Succeeded by: Shiva Maya Tumbahamphe

President of People's Socialist Party
- In office 2020–2023
- Preceded by: Office created
- Succeeded by: Raj Kishor Yadav

Member of the House of Representatives
- In office 2 May 2023 – 12 September 2025
- Preceded by: Ram Sahaya Yadav
- Succeeded by: Chandan Kumar Singh
- Constituency: Bara 2
- In office 4 March 2018 – 18 September 2022
- Preceded by: Ashok Kumar Mandal
- Succeeded by: Chandra Kant Raut
- Constituency: Saptari 2

Member of the Constituent Assembly / Legislature Parliament
- In office 28 May 2008 – 14 October 2017
- Preceded by: Girija Prasad Koirala
- Succeeded by: Consuituency abolished
- Constituency: Sunsari 5

Personal details
- Born: Upendra Yadav; 8 January 1961 (age 65) Bhagawatpur, Saptari, Nepal
- Party: PSP-N (2020–present)
- Other political affiliations: CPN (UML) (1991–1999); CPN (Maoist) (1999–2005); MJF-N (2006–2015); FSF-N (2015–2019); Samajbadi (2019–2020)
- Spouse: Parbati Yadav
- Children: Amrendra Yadav and 1 daughter
- Parents: Dhani Lal Yadav (father); Phudani Devi Yadav (mother)

Upendra Yadav (Nepali: उपेन्द्र यादव; born 12 November 1960) is a Nepalese politician who has twice served as Deputy Prime Minister of Nepal and also as the chairman of the People's Socialist Party, Nepal from 2020 until 2023.

He was previously a Minister of Health and Population. He also served as the Minister of Foreign Affairs in the Dahal cabinet from 2008 to 2009 and in the Khanal cabinet in 2011. Yadav lost an election in 2022, being defeated by Janamat Party chair CK Raut in Saptari 2 with a margin of 18,000 votes.

== Early life and education ==
Yadav was born in Bhagwatpur, Saptari to Dhanilal Yadav and Phudani Devi Yadav on 12 November 1960. He grew up in Madhuwan and completed his SLC examinations there in 1975. He completed his bachelor's degree in mathematics from Hattisar College in Dharan and his master's degree in law at Mahendra Morang Adarsh Multiple Campus in Biratnagar.

== Political career ==
Yadav was involved in protests against the panchayat system as far back as 1975. He was involved in the 1979 student protests and was arrested in Biratnagar and was imprisoned for fourth months. He was also arrested in 1985 at Kathmandu and imprisoned for a year for participating in a Satyagraha organized by Nepali Congress. Yadav joined the CPN (Unified Marxist–Leninist) in 1991 and contested for the House of Representatives from Sunsari 4 in the same year. He gained 8,672 votes but finished a distant second. He served as the district leader of Sunsari and Morang district during his time in the party. He resigned from the party in 1997.

=== Madheshi Jana Adhikar Forum: 1997–2015 ===
He founded the Madheshi Jana Adhikar Forum in the mid-1990s along with Nepali Congress leader Jay Prakash Gupta as a non-governmental organization that advocated for Madheshi rights. After leaving CPN (UML) Yadav had become an alternate central committee member of CPN (Maoist). In February 2004 Yadav was arrested in New Delhi along with Maoist party members Matrika Yadav and Mohan Baidya. He was released after two months while the others were handed over to Nepalese authorities in 2006.

==== Madhesh movement ====
He was again arrested on 16 January 2007 in Kathmandu along with MP Amaresh Kumar Singh and a dozen others after they burned copies of the Interim Constitution of Nepal, 2007 after it did not address the issue of federalism and greater political representation from the Terai in the parliament and the constituent assembly. Following mass protests and indefinite strikes in the Terai region organized by his party, the government agreed to amend the interim constitution and on 12 April 2007, Nepal turned into a federal republic.

==== Constituent Assembly ====
He registered the organization as a political party on 26 April 2007 to contest the constituent assembly elections. He was elected to the 1st Nepalese Constituent Assembly from Sunsari 5 at the 2008 elections. He served as the Minister of Foreign Affairs in a coalition government with the CPN (Maoist) from August 2008 to May 2009 and again in a coalition government with CPN (Unified Marxist–Leninist) in 2011. After Bijay Kumar Gachhadar split away from the party to form Madheshi Jana Adhikar Forum (Loktantrik), Yadav served as the parliamentary party leader of the MJF. He was also a member of the State Affairs Committee of the Constituent Assembly. He retained his seat in the 2nd Nepalese Constituent Assembly from Sunsari 5 at the 2013 elections. He served as the parliamentary party leader of MJF and also served as a member of the Constitutional-Political Dialogue and Consensus Committee.

=== National politics: since 2015 ===
On 15 June 2015, his party merged with Federal Socialist Party and Khas Samabesi Party to form the Federal Socialist Forum. He served as co-chairman of the new party along with Rajendra Prasad Shrestha. He contested the 2017 elections to the House of Representatives from Saptari 2 and was elected. He was a member of the Education and Health Committee of the House of Representatives. He served as the Deputy Prime Minister in a coalition government with the Nepal Communist Party from June 2018 to December 2019. His party merged with the Rastriya Janata Party Nepal in 2020 to form the People's Socialist Party. He served as co-chairman of the party with Mahantha Thakur until Thakur split off to form the Loktantrik Samajwadi Party, Nepal. Yadav contested the 2022 elections to the House of Representatives from Saptari 2 again but lost to Janamat Party chairman CK Raut by a margin of over 18,000 votes.

== Criticism ==
Yadav has been accused of being linked to Hindu extremist groups and in December 2006 publicly supported the notion of Nepal as a Hindu nation at a program of right-wing Hindu groups in Gorakhpur, India. A month after the incident, he was leading the protests in support of turning Nepal into a secular federal republic.

He has also been accused of focusing on Yadavs instead of the greater Madheshi community. He was criticized by some for supporting Nepali Congress candidate Ram Baran Yadav instead of CPN (Maoist) candidate Ram Raja Prasad Singh.

Yadav had been criticized for the Gaur incident where dozens of CPN (Maoist) cadres were left dead following violent clashes with cadres of Madheshi Jana Adhikar Forum. Yadav was supposed to address a mass meeting of MJFN supporters in Gaur, Rautahat, the Madhesh Mukti Morcha of CPN (Maoist) were also holding their rally at the same venue. MJF and Maoist supporters were engaged in clashes during the Madhesh movement and the Gaur incident was seen as retaliation for these clashes.

Once a major activist for Madheshi people, Yadav has been criticized for forgetting Madhesh-centric issues as he became more active in national politics.

== Personal life ==
Yadav is married to Parbati Yadav with whom he has two children, a son and a daughter. His son, Amarendra Yadav, contested the 2022 local elections for the deputy mayor of Biratnagar but lost.

== Electoral history ==
Year	Office	Electorate	Party	Main opponent	Votes for Yadav		Result	Notes
Year	Office	Electorate	Party	Main opponent	Total	P.	Result	Notes
1991	Representative	Sunsari 4	CPN (UML)	Khalil Miya	8,672	2nd	Lost	
2008	Constituent	Sunsari 5	MJF-N	Mohammad Mahfuz Ansari	23,939	1st	Won	
2008	Constituent	Morang 5	MJF-N	Amrit Kumar Aryal	27,508	1st	Won	Vacated
2013	Constituent	Sunsari 5	MJF-N	Gafar Ansari Miya	7,264	1st	Won	
2013	Constituent	Morang 5	MJF-N	Amrit Kumar Aryal	12,566	2nd	Lost	
2017	Representative	Saptari 2	Forum Nepal	Umesh Kumar Yadav	21,620	1st	Won	
2022	Representative	Saptari 2	PSP-Nepal	Chandra Kant Raut	16,979	2nd	Lost	
2023	Representative	Bara 2	PSP-Nepal	Shivachandra Prasad Kushwaha	28,415	1st	Won	

== See also ==
- Madheshi Jana Adhikar Forum, Nepal
- Madhes Movement
