= Jay Prakash Gupta =

Nepalese politician

- जय प्रकाश गुप्ता

Minister of Information and Communication
- In office 4 September 2011 – 21 February 2012
- President: Ram Baran Yadav
- Prime Minister: Babu Ram Bhattarai

Ministry of Agriculture and Cooperative
- In office 18 August 2008 – 25 May 2009
- President: Ram Baran Yadav
- Prime Minister: Puspa Kamal Dahal

Personal details
- Born: Saptari, Nepal
- Party: Terai Madhesh Rastriya Abhiyan (Ta.Ma.Ra)
- Other political affiliations: Madheshi Janadhikar Forum (Republican) (till 2012); Madheshi Janaadhikar Forum, Nepal (2008–2009); Nepali Congress (?–2008)

Jay Prakash Gupta (Nepali: जय प्रकाश गुप्ता), also referred to as Jay Prakash Anand or popularly JP Gupta, is a Nepalese politician and former member of the Madhesi Jana Adhikar Forum, Nepal(Republican) party. He was born in Saptari District, Nepal. Before joining the forum, he was a member of Nepali Congress. His political career was progressing well within the party, but he left the party during the Madhesh movement. He is presently running the Terai Madhesh Rastriya Abhiyan.

== Political career ==
Gupta, once an influential leader in the Nepali Congress left the party, claiming it was not seriously listening to the voice and demand of Madhesh during the Madhesh Movement. He was not alone to do so. Influential leaders including Mahantha Thakur, Bijay Kumar Gachhadar and Sarad Singh Bhandari had also left the party with similar concerns. After this, he joined Madheshi Janadhikar Forum. Due to a difference in political vision, the party was divided and hence Gupta joined Madheshi Janadhikar Forum (Republican).

Gupta had won the 1994 and 1999 elections from Saptari-1 on a Nepali Congress ticket and was once an influential leader of the party in the region. In 2008, he won the First Constituent Assembly Election and became a CA member. Following this, he became Minister for Agriculture and Cooperatives in the first Dahal Cabinet as a part of the agreement between the forum and the CPN(Maoist).

He had previously been sworn in five times as a Minister between 2004 and 2009: once as a state minister and four times as a cabinet minister, including as the Minister for Communication and Information. While he was in the Baburam Bhattarai cabinet, he was convicted in a case of abuse of authority and was sentenced to 18 months in jail. This is the only case in Nepal when a sitting minister was jailed. At various point in time, he claimed it was part of a conspiracy by individuals unhappy with his actions and jealous of his achievements to destroy his political career. After serving about 13 months in prison, he was released on 21 February 2012.

Currently, he appears to be away from active politics but remains committed to his own political mission, frequently visiting villages to learn about people's experiences and problems. He is presently running Terai Madhesh Rastriya Abhiyan. He is not seen much in public these days, especially after 2015. He was expected to contest elections from his own party in 2017, but he did not, and the reasons for his silence remain controversial.

== Published books ==
"अख्तियारको थुना"(English-Akhtiyako thuna) by Jay Prakash Gupta.

== Electoral history ==
Except the 1991 election, Gupta remained victorious in every election he gave candidacy. Still he couldn't contest 2013 elections as he was in jail. He didn't contest the 2017 election, in spite of some expectations to the contrary.

=== Election in 2000s ===
==== 2008 Constituent Assembly election ====
Saptari-2
Party	Candidate	Votes
Madhesi Jana Adhikar Forum, Nepal	Jay Prakash Prasad Gupta	8,515
Terai Madhesh Loktantrik Party	Bijay Kumar Yadav	5,765
Sadbhavana Party	Madhuri Mandal	5,384
CPN (Maoist)	Ashok Kumar Mandal	4,119
Nepali Congress	Dev Narayan Mandal	3,789
CPN (Unified Marxist–Leninist)	Jag Dev Yadav	2,922
Dalit Janajati Party	Raj Kishor Khang	1,821
Rastriya Janata Dal Nepal	Dev Narayan Mukhiya	1,660
Nepal Sadbhavana Party (Anandidevi)	Bikas Kumar Tiwari	1,036
Others		3,629
Invalid votes		3,963
Result	MJFN gain	
Source: Election Commission

=== Election in the 1990s ===
==== 1999 legislative elections ====
Saptari-1
Party	Candidate	Votes
Nepali Congress	Jay Prakash Anand	15,083
CPN (Unified Marxist–Leninist)	Hira Lal Chaudhary	13,853
Nepal Sadbhawana Party	Mamata Jha	7,178
CPN (Marxist–Leninist)	Jagadish Prasad Yadav	5,820
Independent	Shrawan Kumar Bista	3,793
Rastriya Prajatantra Party	Guru Sharan Rohita	2,476
Others		1,385
Invalid Votes		1,899
Result	Congress hold	
Source: Election Commission

==== 1994 legislative elections ====
Saptari-1
Party	Candidate	Votes
Nepali Congress	Jay Prakash Anand	18,006
CPN (Unified Marxist–Leninist)	Hira Lal Chaudhary	13,885
Rastriya Prajatantra Party	Devendra Jha	6,200
Nepal Sadbhawana Party	Muralidhar Yadav	3,204
Others		1,687
Result	Congress gain	
Source: Election Commission

==== 1991 legislative elections ====
Saptari-1
Party	Candidate	Votes
CPN (Unified Marxist–Leninist)	Hira Lal Chaudhary	13,973
Nepali Congress	Jay Prakash Anand	12,050
Result	CPN (UML) gain	
