= Mahindra Ray Yadav =

Nepali politician

Mahendra Ray Yadav
- महिन्द्र राय यादव
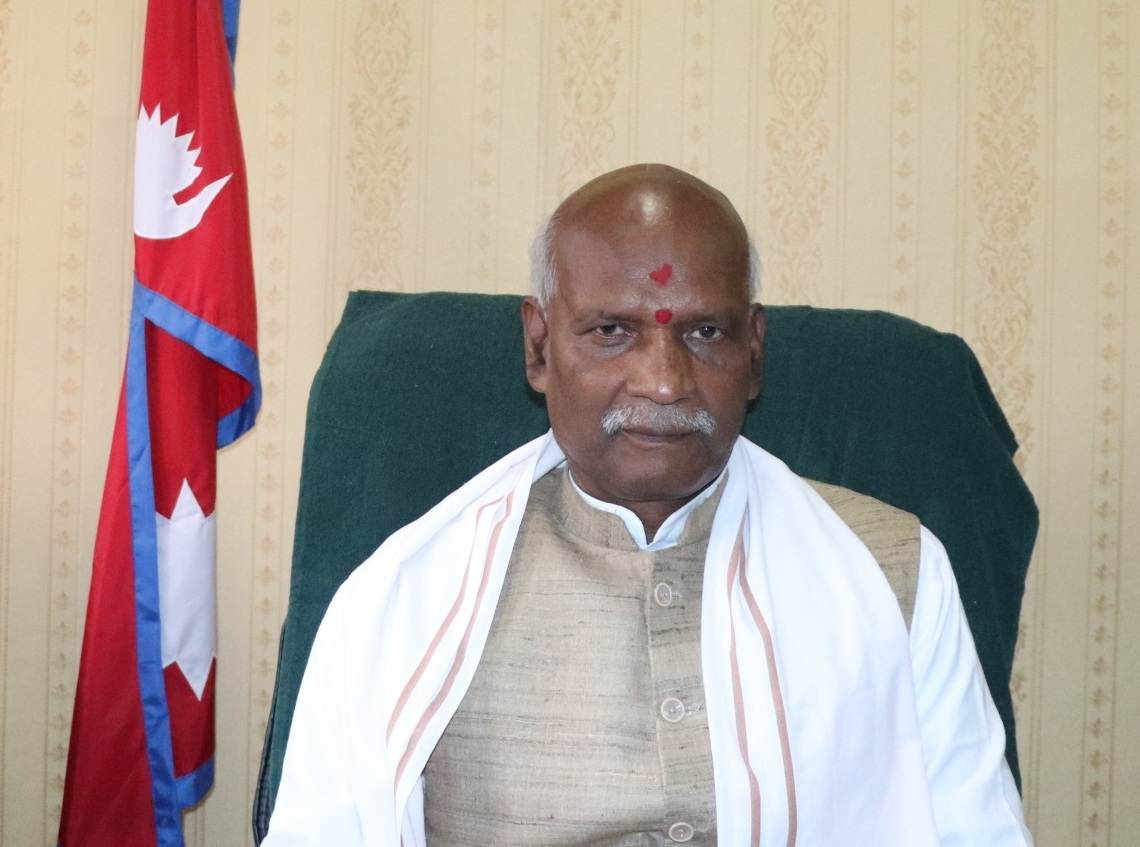
- Mahindra Ray Yadav in 2021

Minister for Women, Children and Senior Citizen
- In office 31 March 2023 – 7 May 2023
- President: Ram Chandra Paudel
- Prime Minister: Pushpa Kamal Dahal
- Vice President: Ram Sahaya Yadav
- Preceded by: Pushpa Kamal Dahal

President of Nepal Socialist Party
- Incumbent
- Assumed office 30 July 2022 Serving with Baburam Bhattarai
- Preceded by: Position established

Minister for Agriculture and Livestock Development
- In office 8 October 2021 – 4 July 2022
- President: Bidya Devi Bhandari
- Prime Minister: Sher Bahadur Deuba

Member of the House of Representatives
- In office 4 March 2018 – 12 September 2025
- Preceded by: Ram Chandra Chaudhary
- Succeeded by: Rabin Mahato
- Constituency: Sarlahi 2
- In office October 1994 – May 2002
- Preceded by: Bramha Narayan Chaudhary
- Constituency: Sarlahi 1

Member of Constituent Assembly
- In office 21 January 2012 – 14 October 2017
- Preceded by: Rajendra Mahato
- Succeeded by: Amresh Kumar Singh
- Constituency: Sarlahi 4
- In office 28 May 2008 – 28 May 2012
- Constituency: Party list

Personal details
- Born: 24 June 1954 (age 71) Basantapur, Haripurwa Municipality, Sarlahi
- Party: Nepal Socialist Party
- Other political affiliations: CPN (Manandhar); CPN (UML); TMLP; TMSP; Rastriya Janata Party

Mahendra Ray Yadav is a Nepali politician, former minister and a member of the House of Representatives of the federal parliament of Nepal. He is the current central committee chairman of Nepal Socialist Party.

He was elected under the first-past-the-post system from Sarlahi-2 constituency, representing Rastriya Janata Party Nepal. In the 2013 Nepalese Constituent Assembly election, he defeated his nearest rival, Rajendra Mahato of Sadbhawana Party, acquiring 11,534 votes to the latter's 8,790.

== Political life ==
As of March 2017, he was leading Tarai Madhes Sadbhawana Party in the legislature parliament as party chairman. Following the formation of Rastriya Janata Party Nepal, he was one of the six members of the party presidium. He became the coordinator of the chairman council on 20 January 2019, taking over from Rajendra Mahato.

== Electoral history ==
=== 2017 legislative elections ===
Sarlahi 2
Party	Candidate	Votes
Rastriya Janata Party Nepal	Mahendra Raya Yadav	29,191
Nepali Congress	Jangi Lal Raya	18,976
CPN (Maoist Centre)	Dinesh Raya	8,037
Naya Shakti Party, Nepal	Pushpa Ranjitkar	1,449
Others		1,617
Invalid votes		4,399
Result	RJPN gain	
Source: Election Commission

=== 2013 Constituent Assembly election ===
Sarlahi 4
Party	Candidate	Votes
Terai Madhesh Sadbhavna Party	Mahendra Raya Yadav	11,534
Sadbhavana Party	Rajendra Mahato	8,790
CPN (Unified Marxist–Leninist)	Ram Narayan Sah	8,348
Madheshi Janaadhikar Forum, Nepal	Ram Chandra Raya Yadav	5,020
Nepali Congress	Laxman Raya	2,605
Rastriya Madhesh Samajbadi Party	Dinesh Raya	1,714
UCPN (Maoist)	Ram Kishun Ray	1,601
Others		2,729
Result	TMSP gain	
Source: NepalNews

=== 1999 legislative elections ===
Sarlahi 1
Party	Candidate	Votes
CPN (Unified Marxist–Leninist)	Mahendra Raya Yadav	23,444
Nepali Congress	Ramasis Sah Teli	19,126
Samyukta Janamorcha Nepal	Pralhad Kumar Budhathoki	1,746
Nepal Sadbhawana Party	Asarfi Chaudhary	1,653
CPN (Marxist–Leninist)	Indra Bahadur Khadka	1,450
Rastriya Prajatantra Party	Tulsi Raj Ghimire	1,065
Others		1,856
Invalid Votes		1,795
Result	CPN (UML) hold	
Source: Election Commission

=== 1994 legislative elections ===
Sarlahi 1
Party	Candidate	Votes
CPN (Unified Marxist–Leninist)	Mahendra Raya Yadav	23,758
Nepali Congress	Bramha Narayan Chaudhary	13,553
Rastriya Prajatantra Party	Ammar Bahadur Thapa	3,393
Nepal Sadbhawana Party	Anup Raya Yadav	1,875
Others		421
Result	CPN (UML) gain	
Source: Election Commission

== See also ==
- Nepal Socialist Party
