= Madhesi Youth Forum =

Madhesi Youth Forum is the youth wing of the Madhesi Janadhikar Forum in Nepal. As of April 2007, Jitedra Sen was the president of MYF.
