= Federal Alliance (Nepal) =

The Federal Coalition (Nepali: संघीय गठबन्धन) is a coalition of twenty eight major regional based Nepalese political parties that are demanding the identity based autonomy states in Nepal and the equal representation in Nepalese parliament. Nepalese communities mainly Madhesi, Rai people, Limbu, Magar, Tamang, Gurung, Tharu people and many Janjati Adivasi(indigenous peoples) are fighting every day for rights and autonomy but they are historically underrepresented by ruling elites Bahun (Hill Brahmins) and Chhetris till date.
