= Madhesi Janadhikar Forum Madhesh =

Madhesi Janadhikar Forum Madhesh मधेशी जनअधिकार फोरम मधेश
- Leader: Bhagyanath Gupta
- Founded: 2007
- Preceded by: Madheshi Janadhikar Forum (Nepal)
- Succeeded by: Tarai-Madhesh Loktantrik Party

Election symbol

Madhesi Janadhikar Forum Madhesh is a political party in Nepal, and a splinter group of the main Madhesi Janadhikar Forum. The split occurred in September 2007, as the MJF vice chairmen Bhagyanath Gupta and Kishor Kumar Bishwash and Ram Kumar Sharma and Jitendra Sonal were expelled from MJF. Gupta became chairman, Sharma general secretary, Bishwash and Sonal vice chairmen of the new party. However, Sonal and Sharma were expelled from the party in December 2007.

The party was one of the last parties to be registered with the Election Commission of Nepal ahead of the 2008 Constituent Assembly election. The party is a member of the Federal Republic National Front, but has reportedly rejected the deal between FRNF and the Government of Nepal signed on March 1, 2008.
