= Rastriya Janata Party Nepal =

Rastriya Janata Party Nepal राष्ट्रिय जनता पार्टी नेपाल
- Abbreviation: RJPN
- Chairperson: Anil Kumar Jha (Rotation basis)
- General Secretary: Rajeev Jha; Jitendra Prasad Sonal; Jangi Lal Ray
- Presidium members: Mahantha Thakur; Mahendra Raya Yadav; Sharat Singh Bhandari; Raj Kishor Yadav; Rajendra Mahato
- Deputy-chairperson: Laxman Lal Karna; Raj Kumar Thapa
- Founded: 20 April 2017
- Dissolved: 22 April 2020
- Merger of: TMLP (2007); Sadbhavana; RMSP; TMSP; MJF (R); NSP
- Merged into: PSP-N
- Succeeded by: People's Progressive Party; Terai Madhesh Loktantrik Party; Nagrik Unmukti Party; Loktantrik Samajwadi Party, Nepal
- Ideology: Regionalism; Social democracy Madhesi rights Janajati rights Secularism
- Political position: Centre-left

Election symbol
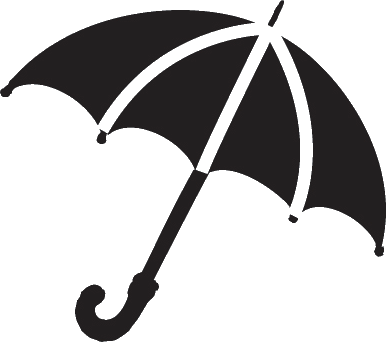

Party flag
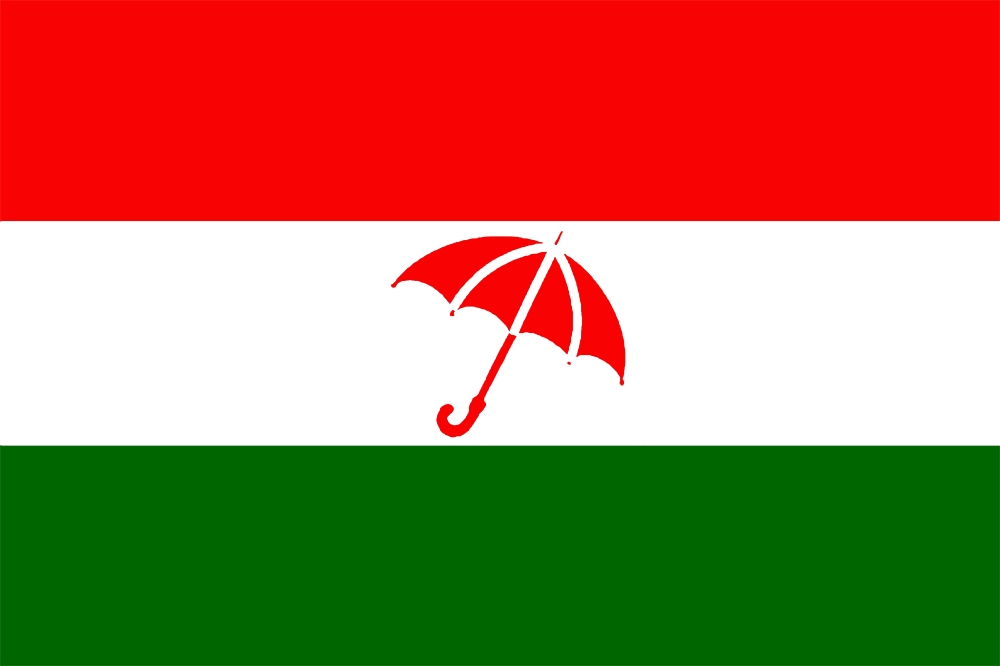

The Rastriya Janata Party, Nepal, abbr. RJPN (Nepali: राष्ट्रिय जनता पार्टी, नेपाल, translation: National People's Party, Nepal) was the fourth-largest political party in Nepal after the Nepali Congress, the Nepal Communist Party and the Samajbadi Party, Nepal. It was formed on 21 April 2017 after the merger of Tarai Madhes Loktantrik Party, led by the Mahantha Thakur, Terai Madhes Sadbhawana Party, led by the Mahendra Raya Yadav, Sadbhavana Party, led by the Rajendra Mahato, Nepal Sadbhawana Party, led by the Anil Kumar Jha, Madhesi Jana Adhikar Forum (Republican), led by Rajkishor Yadav and Rastriya Madhesh Samajwadi Party, led by Sharat Singh Bhandari. The party was founded with the ideology of democratic system.

On 22 April 2020, the party merged with Samajbadi Party, Nepal to form Janata Samajbadi Party, Nepal.

== History ==
On 14 April 2017, six of the seven constituents of the United Democratic Madhesi Front agreed in principle to merge in a bid to form a strong force representing the Terai region. The party was formed on 21 April, as the Rastriya Janata Party and Mahanta Thakur was announced as its chairperson. The party on 26 April, changed its name to Rastriya Janata Party Nepal (RJPN) after it clashed with another party bearing the name Rastriya Janata Party, which later merged with Nepal Loktantrik Forum, registered with the Election Commission. The party registered with the Election Commission on 7 July 2017.

=== Elections, 2017–2020 ===
The party had initially decided to not participate in the third phase of the local elections but changed their decision later. The election of 1,112 candidates of the party handed it the second highest number of candidates elected in Province No. 2. The party won 25 mayoral posts, including a win in Janakpur.

Ahead of the legislative and provincial elections, the RJPN formed an alliance with the Upendra Yadav-led Federal Socialist Forum, Nepal. The party won 17 seats in the House of Representatives and finished with the fourth highest vote count in proportional representation. The party won in key areas of their home province, Province No. 2, winning 13 mayoral seats out of 67 municipalities in the province, which is nearly 19%, making it the 3rd largest party at the local level in the province.

The party won 25 seats in the provincial assembly for Province No. 2, 1 seat in Lumbini Province and 2 seats in Sudurpashchim. Following the election, RJPN and Federal Socialist Forum announced that they would form a coalition government in Province No. 2, with FSFN getting the post of Chief Minister and RJPN getting the post of Speaker.

The party won 2 seats in the National Assembly elections, both candidates were elected unopposed from Province No. 2. On 20 April 2018, disgruntled leaders led by Ashok Kumar Yadav broke away from the party and formed Rastriya Janata Party (Democratic).

The party merged with Samajbadi Party, Nepal on 22 April 2020.

== Breakaway factions ==
=== List of breakaway parties ===
Party	Leader	Region	Status
Loktantrik Samajwadi Party	Mahantha Thakur	Madhesh and Lumbini province	Active
Terai Madhesh Loktantrik Party	Brikhesh Chandra Lal	Madhesh province	Active
Janata Paragatisheel Party	Hridayesh Tripathi	Lumbini province	Active
Nagrik Unmukti Party	Resham Lal Chaudhary	Tharuhath region	Active

== Electoral performance ==
Election	Leader	Votes		Seats	Position	Resulting government
Election	Leader	#	%	Seats	Position	Resulting government
2017	Mahantha Thakur	472,254	4.95	17 / 275	4th	CPN (UML)-CPN (Maoist Centre)

== Presence in various provinces ==
Province	Year of election	Votes		Seats	Position	Resulting government
Province	Year of election	#	%	Seats	Position	Resulting government
Madhesh Province	2017	318,524	20.72	25 / 107	2nd	FSFN–RJPN
Lumbini Province	2017	54,110	3.36	1 / 87	5th	CPN (UML)–CPN (MC)
Sudurpashchim	2017	36,902	4.66	2 / 53	4th	CPN (UML)–CPN (MC)

== Leadership ==
=== Presidium ===
The Rastriya Janata Party Nepal was led by a six member presidium who would share the chairmanship of the party on a rotational basis.

- Mahantha Thakur
- Mahendra Raya Yadav
- Rajendra Mahato
- Anil Kumar Jha
- Raj Kishor Yadav
- Sharat Singh Bhandari

=== General Secretary ===
- Rajeev Jha
- Jitendra Prasad Sonal
- Jangi Lal Raya
- Jitendra Singh Yadav
- Keshav Kumar Jha
- Manish Kumar Suman

=== Senior leader ===
- Hridayesh Tripathi

=== Vice president ===
- Brikhesh Chandra Lal
- Laxman Lal Karna

== See also ==
- Loktantrik Samajwadi Party, Nepal
- Nepal Sadbhawana Party
- People's Progressive Party
- Rastriya Mukti Party Nepal
- Terai Madhesh Loktantrik Party (2021)
