= Bhagwatpur =

Bhagwatpur is a village in Saran district in the Indian state of Bihar. Its population is 3,920.
