= Laxman Lal Karna =

Nepali politician

- लक्ष्मणलाल कर्ण

Minister of Land Management, Cooperatives and Poverty Alleviation
- In office 4 June 2021 – 22 June 2021
- President: Bidya Devi Bhandari
- Prime Minister: KP Sharma Oli

Member of Parliament, Pratinidhi Sabha
- In office 4 March 2018 – 18 September 2022
- Preceded by: Surendra Prasad Chaudhary
- Succeeded by: Ramesh Rijal
- Constituency: Parsa 4

Member of 1st and 2nd Nepalese Constituent Assembly for Sadbhavana Party list
- In office 28 May 2008 – 14 October 2017

Personal details
- Born: March 28, 1947 (age 79)
- Party: Loktantrik Samajwadi
- Other political affiliations: Nepal Sadbhawana Party; Sadbhavana Party; Rastriya Janata Party; People's Socialist Party

Laxman Lal Karna is a Nepali politician and was Minister of Land Management, Cooperatives and Poverty Alleviation since 4 June 2021 but was removed from the post by Supreme Court on 22 June 2021 making the tenure of just 18 days and shortest till date. He was also a member of the House of Representatives of the federal parliament of Nepal. He was elected under the first-past-the-post system from Parsa-4 constituency, representing Rastriya Janata Party Nepal. He defeated his nearest rival Ramesh Rijal of Nepali Congress by acquiring 20,738 votes to Rijal's 14,702.

== See also ==
- People's Progressive Party
