= Samajbadi Party, Nepal (2019) =

Samajbadi Party, Nepal समाजवादी पार्टी, नेपाल
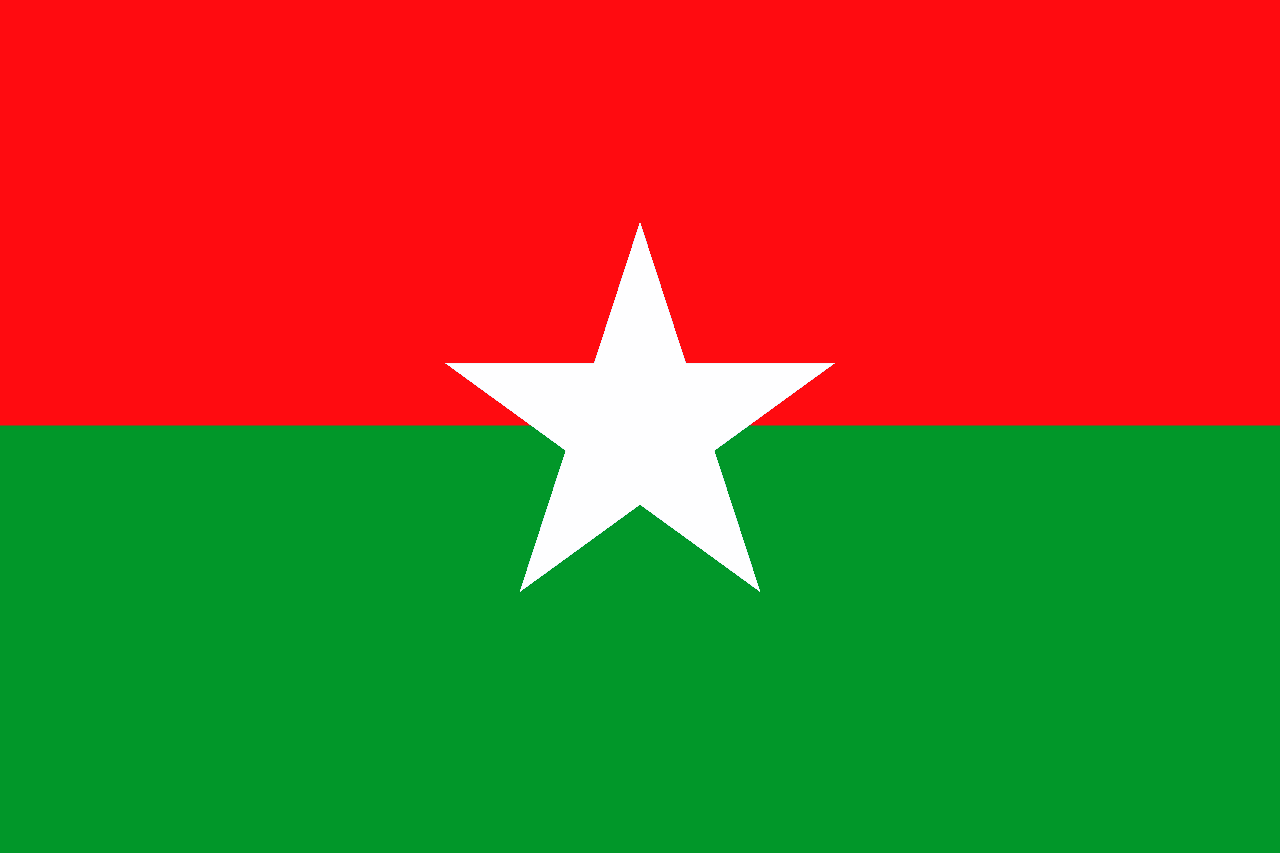
- Abbreviation: SPN
- Chairperson: Upendra Yadav (Central committee); Baburam Bhattarai (Federal committee)
- Founded: 6 May 2019 (6 years ago)
- Dissolved: April 23, 2020; 5 years ago
- Merger of: FSF-N; Naya Shakti
- Merged into: PSP-N
- Succeeded by: PSP-N; NSP
- Headquarters: Kathmandu
- Ideology: Democratic socialism Ethnic federalism
- Political position: Left-wing

Election symbol
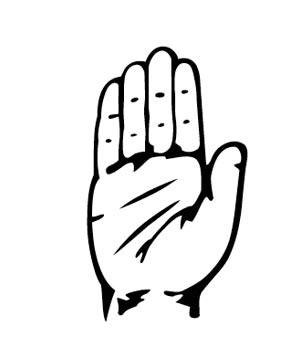

Website
- socialistnepal.org

The Samajbadi Party, Nepal, abbr. SPN (Nepali: समाजवादी पार्टी, नेपाल, lit. 'Socialist Party, Nepal') was the third-largest political party in Nepal after the Nepali Congress and the Nepal Communist Party. It was formed on 6 May 2019 by the merger of the Federal Socialist Forum, Nepal, led by Deputy Prime Minister Upendra Yadav, and the Naya Shakti Party, Nepal, led by former Prime Minister Baburam Bhattarai. The party was founded with the ideology of democratic socialism and ethnic federalism. It uses the flag and election symbol of the Federal Socialist Forum, Nepal.

On 23 April 2020, the party merged with Rastriya Janata Party Nepal to form Janata Samajwadi Party, Nepal.

== Leadership ==
- Chairman of Federal Council: Baburam Bhattarai

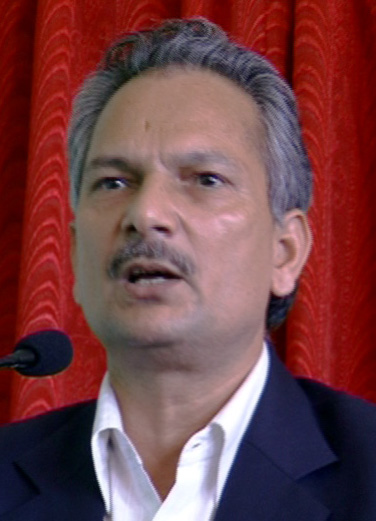
Baburam Bhattarai, chairman of the party

- Chairman of Central Committee: Upendra Yadav

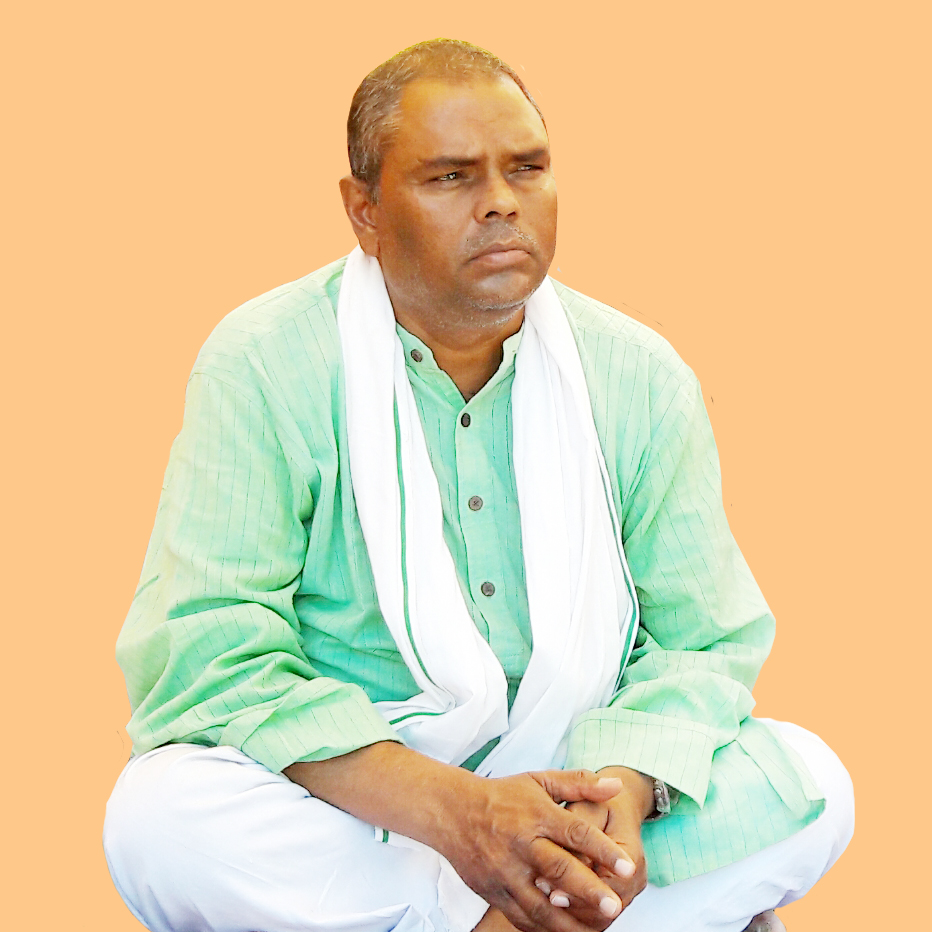
Upendra Yadav, chairman of the party

- Senior Leader: Ashok Rai

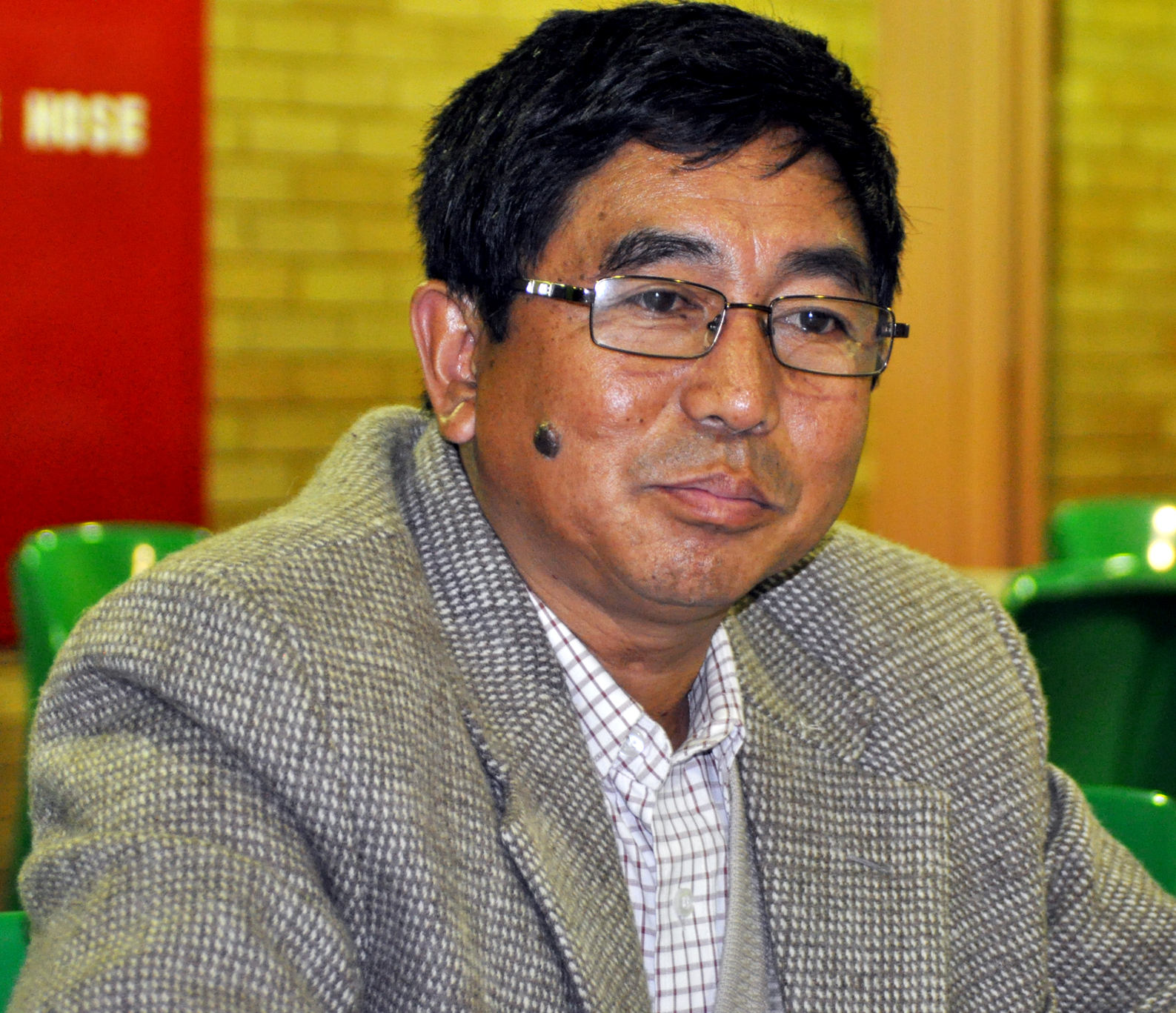
Ashok Rai at farewell program in Australia

- Co-Chairman: Rajendra Prasad Shrestha
- Vice-Chairmen (8): Navaraj Subedi, Parshuram Khapung, Yuvaraj Karki, Rakam Chemjong, Renu Kumari Yadav, Lal Babu Raut, Hisila Yami, and Hem Raj Rai.
- General secretaries (3): Ganga Narayan Shrestha, Rana Dhwaj Kandangba, and Ram Sahay Prasad Yadav
- Deputy General secretaries (3): Dambar Khatiwada, Dan Bahadur Bishwokarma, and Prakash Adhikari
- Secretaries (6): Mohammad Istiyak Rai, Durga Sob, Parshuram Basnet, and Prashant Singh. Two vacant.
- Treasurer: Bijay Kumar Yadav

== Presence in the Federal Parliament ==
Election	Leader	Seats	Position
2017	Upendra Yadav	17 / 275	3rd

== Presence in various provinces ==
Before the merger Federal Socialist Forum, Nepal was represented in the provincial assemblies in Province No. 1, Province No. 2 and Lumbini Province, whereas Naya Shakti Party, Nepal was represented in Bagmati Province and Gandaki Province. This list is a combination of both parties.

Province	Seats	Year of election
Province No. 1	3 / 93	2017
Province No. 2	29 / 107	2017
Bagmati Province	1 / 110	2017
Gandaki Province	2 / 60	2017
Lumbini Province	5 / 87	2017

== See also ==
- List of political parties in Nepal
- People's Socialist Party (Nepal)
- Federal Socialist Forum, Nepal
- Naya Shakti Party, Nepal
