= Madhesh movement =

Madhesi people's revolt against oppression, injustice and discrimination

Madhesh Movement (Nepali: मधेस आन्दोलन) was a political movement launched by various political parties, especially those based in Madhes, for equal rights, dignity and identity of Madhesis Tharus, Muslims and Janjati groups in Nepal. In nearly a decade, Nepal witnessed three Madhesh Movements - the first Madhesh Movement erupted in 2007, the second Madhesh Movement in 2008 and the third Madhesh Movement in 2015. Ramesh Mahato was Madhesi martyr in 2007 at Lahan.

== History and status ==
The discussions around the 1990 constitution became crucial in encouraging the Madhes movement that aimed to abandon cultural and lingual superiority of the high castes.

=== Madhes Movement I ===
The first Madhes Movement broke out in the southern plains of Nepal in 2007. About the origin of the first Madhes Movement, Journalist Amarendra Yadav writes in The Rising Nepal, "When the then seven-party alliance of the mainstream political parties and the CPN-Maoist jointly announced the Interim Constitution in 2007, it totally ignored the concept of federalism, the most desired political agenda of Madhesis and other marginalised communities. A day after the promulgation of the interim statute, a group of Madhesi activists under the Upendra Yadav-led Madhesi Janaadhikar Forum-Nepal (then a socio-intellectual NGO) burnt copies of the interim constitution at Maitighar Mandala, Kathmandu." This triggered the Madhes Movement I.

The first Madhes movement erupted in 2007 after the seven-party alliance of political parties and CPN- Maoist pronounced the interim constitution of Nepal. The constitution deliberately ignored the demands of Madhesis and other marginalized communities of federalism and equal representation of these ethnic communities. The mass movement brought ethnonationalism as a crucial issue in national discourse of restructuring the state. The first Madhes movement was successful in bringing constitutional identity, representation and political power to a certain limit. Thus, the Madhes movement was a consequence of all such grievances of the ethnic groups against the state of Nepal.

=== Madhes Movement II ===
The second Madhes Movement took place in 2008, jointly launched by Madhesi Janaadhikar Forum-Nepal, the Terai Madhes Loktantrik Party and the Sadbhawana Party led by Rajendra Mahato. The three political goals of this movement launched jointly by Madhesi parties included: federalism, proportional representation, and population-based election constituency, which were later ensured in the 2008 Interim Constitution of Nepal. Violent protests led to the inclusion of federalism in the constitution later.

=== Madhes Movement III ===
Despite the movement for social change, Madhesis still faced unfair treatment and denial of equal rights. Although the interim constitution of 2008 ensured the demands of Madhesis to be considered, the 2015 Constitution of Nepal failed to address any of those issues. The Nepali Times wrote that, "the mainstream parties wanted to pass the new constitution without determining the number and boundaries of provinces. As a result, protests broke throughout the southern plains, and more than 50 people were killed in violent clashes." The third Madhes Movement was induced by the unfair formation of seven federal provinces under the new Constitution. It was considered discriminatory because only eight districts in Terai were given the status of a state while the remaining fourteen districts were from the Hilly region.

However, the Constitution of Nepal 2015 backtracked from those issues that were already ensured by the Interim Constitution of Nepal 2008. Supreme Court of Nepal Advocate Dipendra Jha wrote in The Kathmandu Post that "many other aspects of the new constitution are more regressive than the Interim Constitution of Nepal 2007. Out of all its deficiencies, the most notable one concerns the issue proportional representation or inclusion in all organs of the state." This triggered the third Madhes Movement by Madhesis in Nepal. Although the first amendment to the constitution was done, resistance over the document by Madhesi and Tharus in Nepal still continues.

After the second amendment, the constitution of Nepal attempted to satisfy one of the key demands of the protesters - participation and proportional inclusion. The Madhesi parties did not accept this amendment because this change again was ambiguous and did not specify rights in particular to the Madhesis. The constitution states that 45% of all jobs in state organs and public employment are reserved to 17 groups: "socially backward women, Dalits, Adivasis, Janjatis, Khas Aryas, Tharus, minority groups, persons with disability, marginalized groups, Muslims, backward classes, gender and secularly minority groups, youths, peasants, laborers, the oppressed, and citizens of backward regions". The issue with this amendment was the general division of "youths", historically marginalized groups such as Madhesis or the "Khas Arya", and the hilly upper caste community who are already dominant in politics, being placed in the same category.

== Reasons ==
=== Constitution of Nepal ===
The current constitution is the seventh constitution written in the history of Nepal, after its promulgation in 2015. It is guided by the 2007 Interim Constitution and the Peace Agreement of 2006. It has numerous provisions for economic, social, and political development such as supporting clauses for free market and international trade. A majority of the political parties, citizens and other interest groups have supported the constitution.

=== Citizenship ===
The new constitution is gender discriminatory as it denies single woman to pass on citizenship to their children. According to The Kathmandu Post, clauses in the constitution draft say that both parents have to be Nepali to acquire citizenship. Likewise, a Nepali woman married to a foreigner may not acquire citizenship, but if the father is Nepali, the child is given citizenship regardless. Madhesi communities, who often have marital ties with Indians across the border, are disproportionality affected because they are ethnically and socially connected with the northern Indians.

=== Representation of minority groups ===
Madhesi parties demanded proportional representation in state organs and guarantees for constituencies to be based on population because 20 out of 75 districts in the Terai region house 50% of the population. The provision of 165 members in the parliament was considered problematic because the Hilly and Mountain region were allotted 100 seats when their share of the total population was less than 50% while the Terai region that made up more than 50% of the total population was allotted only 65 seats.

== Timeline of major events ==
=== 1959-2006 ===
- 1959: First elected prime minister B. P. Koirala made Hindi part of the educational curriculum in Madhes.
- 1960: King Mahendra introduced a system of absolute monarchy based on partyless Panchayat System and bans political parties.
- 1979: Student protest which forced the monarchy to hold a referendum for a possible multi party system in the country.
- 1990: People's Movement I restored the multi-party democracy to end the king's autocratic regime.
- November 2006: Government signs the Comprehensive Peace Accord (CPA) with the Maoists, ending the 10-year long civil war.

=== 2007-2017 ===
- 15 January 2007: The parliament passes the Interim Constitution.
- January 2008: Series of bomb blasts in various parts of Terai region where activists are demanding for regional autonomy.
- February 2008: Second Madhes Movement led by an alliance of Madhesi parties, the United Democratic Madhesi Front (UDMF), demanding for a greater degree of proportional representation.
- July 2008: Ram Baran Yadav and Paramananda Jha, both Madhesi, elected as president and vice-president respectively.
- May 2010: The Constituent Assembly is allowed to extend the draft of the constitution of Nepal. It is exempted to extend only up to four times at the most.
- May-November 2011: Supreme Court announces the tenure of Constituent Assembly to be extended twice by three months. The Constitution Assembly extends one last time for six months in November.
- February 2012: State Restructuring Committee and minority groups submit two separate reports.
- May 2012: With no agreement, the Constituent Assembly is dissolved.
- November 2013: Second Constituent Assembly elected to draft the constitution.
- April 2015: A massive 7.8 earthquake hits Nepal reaching a death toll of 9000.
- June 2015: Followed by the massive earthquake and pressure to formulate the constitution of Nepal, three parties sign a 16-point agreement on contentious issues, including federalism, and agree to fast-track the constitution-drafting process. The first draft of constitution is presented to the Constituent Assembly.
- August 2015: Madhesi protest against the constitution draft and boycott it when it was presented.
- September 2015: Promulgation of the constitution of Nepal, defining it as a secular country.
- September 2015: Imposition of an informal economic blockade and violent protests intensify in Terai region.
- October 2015: Nepal Sadbhavana party criticizes Nepali media for blaming India for the blockade
- November 2015: More than 25 protestors and 6 policemen injured during the petrol bomb and stone attacks in Birgunj.
- January 2016: Constitution of Nepal is amended to address some of the issues of the Madhesis.
- February 2016: Government lifts fuel rationing after a six-month long blockade imposed by Madhesis and partially backed by India.
- May 2017: In three of the seven provinces of Nepal, first phase of local level elections were conducted after being held for the last time in 1997, before the Maoist insurgency.
- August 2017: Rejection of the second amendment constitution bill after failing to garner two-thirds of the votes of the parliament. Despite this failure, it opened doors for Madhesi parties to take part in elections.
- November 2017: First local elections held in twenty years to elect a new parliament and form new provincial councils.

== See also ==
- List of active separatist movements in Asia
