= Madheshi Jana Adhikar Forum, Nepal =

Madheshi Jana Adhikar Forum, Nepal मधेसी जनअधिकार फोरम, नेपाल
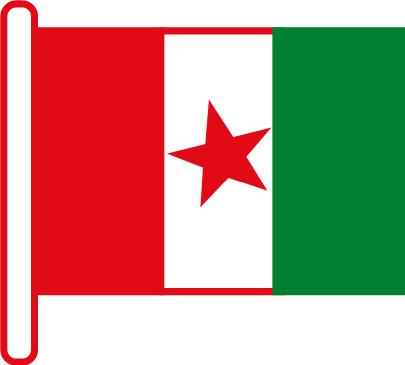
- Abbreviation: MJF/MJFN
- President: Upendra Yadav
- Vice-president: Jay Prakash Gupta
- Senior leader: Bijay Kumar Gachhadar
- Founded: 2006
- Legalised: 26 April 2007
- Dissolved: 16 June 2015
- Succeeded by: Federal Socialist Forum, Nepal
- Headquarters: Kathmandu, Nepal
- Youth wing: Madhesi Youth Forum
- Ideology: Social democracy
- Political position: Centre-left

Party flag

Website
- mprfn.org

The Madhesi Jana Adhikar Forum, Nepal (MJFN), or the Madhesi People's Rights Forum, Nepal, was a political party in Nepal. It was initially not a political party as such but a political advocacy movement demanding ethnic self-determination rights with the formation of a Madhes autonomous region for Teraibasi people, an election system based on proportional representation, and the setting-up of a federal republic in Nepal. The MJFN includes former leaders of other political parties like the Nepali Congress and CPN (UML).

The party was registered with the Election Commission of Nepal ahead of the 2008 Constituent Assembly election. On 16 June 2015, the party merged with Federal Socialist Party and Khas Samabeshi Party to form the Federal Socialist Forum, Nepal.

== History ==
The Madheshi Jana Adhikar Forum was founded in the mid-1990s as a cross-party non-governmental organization that advocated for Madheshi rights by former CPN (Unified Marxist–Leninist) leader Upendra Yadav and Nepali Congress leader Jay Prakash Gupta.

=== Madhesh Movement I ===
On January 16, 2007, the Madhesi Jana Adhikar Forum, Nepal called a general strike in the Terai region of Nepal. The strike was called to demand amendments to the Interim Constitution to include federalism and a new delimitation of constituencies. During a protest in Kathmandu, 14 members of the party including chairman Upendra Yadav and member of the Interim Parliament, Amresh Kumar Singh were arrested after they had burnt copies of the Interim Constitution which they said had failed to address the demands of the Madhesi people. MJFN announced an indefinite vehicular strike in Janakpur against the arrest of Upendra Yadav and other activists of the organisation. During the enforcement of the strike in Lahan in Siraha District, clashes erupted between CPN (Maoist) and MJFN members after the Maoists opened fire when MJFN activists stopped a vehicle belonging to the Maoists. A 16-year-old boy from the MJFN side was killed in the incident. In the ensuing days deadly clashes and demonstrations in Siraha District and around the Terai region left several dead and many more injured.

The ancestral house of CPN (Unified Marxist–Leninist) general secretary Madhav Kumar Nepal in Gaur in Rautahat District was also vandalised by MJFN activists and Nepal Sadbhawana Party leader Badri Mandal. The protests continued despite curfews imposed by the local administration and several protesters were injured after clashes with the police. Many government offices in the Terai were padlocked and signs saying Nepal Government were changed to Madhesh Government. On February 6, 2007, MJFN cadres abducted CPN (Maoist) leader and member of the Interim Parliament, Chinak Kurmi and other Maoist cadres in Bhairahwa. They were released after five hours after Kurmi apologised for harassing MJFN activists.

On 7 February 2007, a government committee to initiate talks with agitating parties in the Terai led by Mahantha Thakur invited MJFN for formal talks. The MJFN suspended its strikes for a ten-day period to enter talks with the government. MJFN also laid down three preconditions for talks to start; a probe into the incident in Lahan with the Maoists, the formation of a high-level committee to investigate the atrocities against the Madhesi people during the agitation and the removal of Minister of Home Affairs Krishna Prasad Sitaula. On 19 February 2007, MJFN called for fresh protests and general strikes in coordination with Nepal Federation of Indigenous Nationalities after accusing the government of failing to create a conducive environment for talks. Two days later the Thakur Committee sent a second formal invitation for talks with the MJFN and NEFIN but the MJFN refused after their demands for the formation of a committee and the removal of Sitaula were not met.

=== Gaur incident ===
Incidents between MJFN and the Eight Party Aliiance continued through February and March with clashes reported in Rupandehi District, Banke District and Parsa District. A 14 year-old schoolboy caught in the clashes was also killed in Puraina in Banke District. The protest was halted for three days from 4 March 2007 to celebrate the Holi festival but was resumed after the end of festivities. On 12 March 2007, MJFN announced the suspension of its indefinite strike but still continued the lock-out of customs office and government offices.

On 21 March 2007, clashes erupted in Gaur in Rautahat District between the MJFN and the Madhesi Mukti Morcha of the CPN (Maoist). Both groups had scheduled their mass meeting in the same venue, the Rice Mill Grounds. Upendra Yadav was going to address the rally for MJFN and lawmaker Prabhu Shah was going to address the Madhesi Mukti Morcha rally. When the rallies organised by both groups in the city converged in the Rice Mill Grounds violent clashes erupted between both sides including reports of bullets of fired. Later twelve bodies were discovered in the place were the clashes had occurred and 15 more bodies were found in Hajmaniya and Mudwalawa about 5 km away from Gaur. Instances of rape, extreme torture and burning were reported during the incident. Blood was also spilled in a nearby temple and the killings in Hajmaniya and Mudwalawa was said to have occurred because of stoning and beatings.

In response to the incident, CPN (Maoist) chairman Pushpa Kamal Dahal compared MJFN to the Contras of Nicaragua and claimed that MJFN was used by imperialists, Hindu extremists and royal reactionaries to derail the peace process in Nepal and called for a ban on MJFN. An MJFN spokesperson, Sitanandan Raya, claimed that the Maoists had been the attackers in Gaur, and that MJF had only retaliated. On 11 April 2007, MJFN formed a three-member panel to look into the Gaur killings, consisting of former Supreme Court Justice Balram Singh Kunwar, Surendra Mishra and Lal Babu Yadav. The findings of the panel stated that MJFN had been attacked by MMM, and that violence had been committed by other Madhesi outfits. Incidents between the MJFN and the Maoists still occurred after the Gaur incident in Rupandehi District and Sunsari District.

=== Settlement ===
On April 26, 2007, MJFN registered itself as a political party with the Election Commission of Nepal while still carrying out strikes in the Terai region. A government talk team led by Ram Chandra Paudel was formed to hold formal talks with the MJFN and informal talks between Paudel and Upendra Yadav was held on 9 May 2007. Formal talks between the two sides however could not be held after MJFN's calls for formation of a judicial commission and withdrawals of all charges against MJFN cadres were not met. The two sides finally began formal talks in Janakpur on 1 June 2007. MJF presented a list of 26 demands including the restructuring of state, formation of a commission to implement state restructuring, inclusion of Madhesi people in all organs of state, federal system of governance, proportional representation, withdrawal of charges against all leaders of MJFN and compensation to those injured during the Madhes agitation. During the first session of talks, agreement was reached on half of the demands presented by the MJFN. The government accepted demands for forming a State Reconstruction Commission, giving martyr status for the people who had died during the agitations and compensation to their families. Clashes between the Maoists and MJFN continued in between talks with the government. Party chairman Upendra Yadav also called for a ban on the Young Communist League, the youth organisation of CPN (Maoist). Kishore Kumar Bishwas of the MJFN talk team said that MJFN would not let the constituent assembly elections be held unless their demands were met. MJFN also formed Madhesi Youth Forum as a result of clashes with YCL.

A second round of talks were on 25 July 2007 in Dhulikhel but the talks ended inconclusively after the government request a two-day break for more homework. When the two sides met two days later in Godawari there was no real progress in meeting any of the MJFN demands and Upendra Yadav had also floated the idea of dissolving the Interim Parliament. A fourth round of talks on 5 August 2007 which included Dev Gurung from the CPN (Maoist), Prakash Sharan Mahat from Nepali Congress (Democratic) and Jhala Nath Khanal from CPN (UML) also concluded inconclusively after both sides could not find common ground. MJFN also opposed the inclusion of a member of the Maoists in the government talk team. Upendra Yadav met prime minister Girija Prasad Koirala on 19 August 2007 and expressed that Koirala was positive towards the MJFN demands. Another round of talks between the government and MJFN was held on 20 August 2007 but MJFN exited the talks after accusing the government side of not seriously considering their demands. After a central committee meeting of the party, MJFN warned the government of new agitations until their demands were met by 31 August 2007. On 30 August 2007, the government reached a 22-point deal with MJFN which included provisions for a mixed electoral system in the upcoming constituent assembly elections, martyr status to those killed during the agitation and proportional representation for marginalised groups.

=== Madhesh Movement II ===
On 6 September 2007, MJFN formed a Central Election Board headed by Sitanandan Raya to lead the election campaign of the party. The party also expelled some members for rejecting the 22-point agreement signed with the government. The expelled party members, vice-chairman Bhagyanath Gupta, Kishore Kumar Bishwas, Ram Kumar Sharma and Jitendra Prasad Sonal had tried to dump party chairman Upendra Yadav but failed after not having enough support in the central committee. The dissidents later formed their own party, Madhesi Janaadhikar Forum Madhesh.

On October 6, 2007, MJFN stated that the government had failed to fulfill its part of the 22-point agreement and was failing to safeguard communal harmony. The party also called for the formation of an all-party government to hold the elections. The party announced the initiation of a new wave of protests after the elections set for November were postponed and the government had failed to honor their agreement.

On 19 January 2008, MJF and the Rajendra Mahato-led Nepal Sadbhavana Party formed the United Madhesi Front, with a 9-point programme. The front reinforced demands for the creation of a Madhes autonomous state and announced the start of their agitation on 23 January. The protests shut down several districts in the Terai and there were clashes between the UMF and the police The Terai Madhesh Loktantrik Party also joined the agitation and the three parties formed the United Democratic Mahdesi Front. The UDMF put forth six demands, including formation of a Madhesi autonomous state, right to self-determination, proportional representation of Madhesis, Janajatis and Dalits and recruitments of Madhesis in civil services including the Nepal Army.

The UDMF protests called for a general strike in the Terai districts and clashes with the police. On February 28, 2008 UDMF signed an 8-point deal with the government of Nepal, ending a 16-day general strike in the Tarai areas. The government and the front agreed to establish a federal democratic republic, declare an autonomous Madhesh, ensure proportional representation for marginalised communities in Nepal Army, declare the people killed in the agitation as martyrs and provide free medical treatment to the injured. The agreement also made a special provision so that the constituents of the UDMF could file candidacy for the constituency assembly elections even after the deadline had passed.

=== 1st Constituent Assembly ===
On March 3, 2008, MJFN submitted a list of 101 candidates for the proportional representation election. The party also nominated 105 candidates for the First Past the Post seats. The party did however fail to meet the requirement of nominating 33% women as only three MJFN candidates in the first past the post election were women. On March 16, 2008, MJF released its election manifesto. The manifesto proposed making Nepal a federal, secular republic with a directly-elected executive president. The parliament would have two chambers, the upper chamber would be an 'Assembly of Ethnicities'. According to the manifesto, regions of Nepal should have the right to self-determination and the formation of a single Madhesh province. The manifesto also demanded increased recruitment of Madhesi youths into the army.

In the Constituent Assembly elections, the party won 52 seats to the 1st Constituent Assembly becoming the fourth largest party. An additional two members were nominated from the party taking their total strength in the constituent assembly to 54 seats. The party joined the coalition government of CPN (Maoist) along with CPN (UML), Sadbhavana Party and CPN (United). The party got four ministerial berths in the coalition government with Upendra Yadav becoming Minister of Foreign Affairs, Bijay Kumar Gachhadar becoming Minister for Physical Planning and Works, Jay Prakash Gupta becoming Minister for Agriculture and Cooperatives and Renu Kumari Yadav becoming Minister of Education. Bijay Kumar Gachhadar was also elected as the parliamentary party leader of the party in the Constituent Assembly.

On 5 June 2009, Upendra Yadav expelled Bijay Kumar Gachhadar and six other members after his agreement to join the new CPN (UML)-led government. The party also announced that it was withdrawing support for the CPN (UML) government. Gachhadar claimed the majority support of the parliamentary party and the central committee and challenged Yadav's decision. Later on 29 July 2009, Gachhadar split from the party taking 26 members of the Constituent Assembly and formed the Madhesi Janaadhikar Forum, Nepal (Democratic).

In March 2011, the party decided to support a new coalition government of CPN (UML) and CPN (Maoist) under Jhala Nath Khanal, and on May of that year Upendra Yadav was inducted as Deputy Prime Minister and Minister of Home affairs in the cabinet. The party faced another split on 24 May 2011 after Jay Prakash Prasad Gupta broke away from the party with 13 members of the Constituent Assembly to form Madhesi Janaadhikar Forum (Republican) after criticizing party chairman Upendra Yadav of supporting the Maoists. The split left MJFN with 11 seats in the Constituent Assembly.

=== 2nd Constituent Assembly ===
In the 2013 Constituent Assembly elections, the party won 10 seats to the 2nd Constituent Assembly. On 16 June 2015, the party merged with Federal Socialist Party, Nepal and Khas Samabeshi Party to form the Federal Socialist Forum, Nepal.

== Criticism ==
In a report, the INSEC, which had participated in the previous probe on the Gaur killings, accused the MJF of 33 killings and 7 adductions in the November 2006–November 2007 period. Reporters Without Borders stated in a report dated June 2007 that MJF was "the most aggressive group towards journalists."

== Electoral performance ==
| Election | Leader | Votes | | Seats | | Position | Resulting government |
| Election | Leader | No. | % | No. | +/– | Position | Resulting government |
|---|---|---|---|---|---|---|---|
| 2008 | Upendra Yadav | 678,327 | 6.32 | 52 / 575 | | 4th | CPN (Maoist)–CPN (UML)–MJFN |
| 2013 | Upendra Yadav | 214,319 | 2.26 | 10 / 575 | ▼44 | ▼7th | Nepali Congress–CPN (UML)–RPP |

== See also ==
- Madhes Movement
- Federal Socialist Forum, Nepal
- Samajbadi Party, Nepal (2019)
- People's Socialist Party (Nepal)
