= Terai Madhesh Loktantrik Party (2007) =

Social democratic political party in Nepal

Terai Madhesh Democratic Party तराई मधेश लोकतान्त्रिक पार्टी
- President: Mahantha Thakur
- Founded: 27 December 2007
- Dissolved: 21 April 2017
- Merged into: Rastriya Janata Party Nepal
- Headquarters: Anamnagar, Kathmandu
- Ideology: Social democracy Madeshi rights
- Political position: Centre-left

Party flag

The Terai Madhesh Loktantrik Party (Nepali: तराई-मधेश लोकतान्त्रिक पार्टी) was a political party in Nepal. The party drew it support from the Terai region of Nepal. The foundation of the party was announced on December 27, 2007. The party was founded with a popular slogan "Mare to Mukti, jiye to Madhesh" meaning if I will live, I will fight for Madhesh and if I will get salvation.

== History ==
Mahantha Thakur and Hridayesh Tripathi resigned as ministers from the cabinet of Girija Prasad Koirala in support of the Madhesh movement after the Seven Party Alliance reached a 23-point agreement with the CPN (Maoist) on 27 December 2007 in order to hold the Constituent Assembly election in April 2008. Thakur had been the treasurer of Nepali Congress and Tripathi was a member of Nepal Sadbhawana Party (Anandidevi). The two along with other Madheshi leaders from the Nepali Congress and CPN (UML) formed the Terai Madhesh Loktantrik Party on 29 December 2007 with Mahantha Thakur as the founding president. Ram Chandra Yadav and Mahindra Ray Yadav who had resigned from the interim legislature were also member of the party.

The party formed the United Madheshi Democratic Front along with Madheshi Jana Adhikar Forum, Nepal and Sadbhavana Party on 9 February 2008 to strengthen the Madhesh movement and called for the formation of a single autonomous Madhesh state stretching the Terai. The front signed an eight-point agreement with the government to end the indefinite strike in the Terai on 28 February 2008.

=== Constituent Assembly ===
The party won 21 seats to the 1st Nepalese Constituent Assembly at the 2008 election and became the fifth largest party. The party joined the Madhav Kumar Nepal government in May 2009 with three cabinet ministers, two ministers of state and one assistant minister. On 31 December 2010, the party suffered a vertical split when 9 lawmakers led by Senior General Secretary and Minister of Industry Mahendra Raya Yadav separated and created new party named Terai Madhes Loktantrik Party Nepal. The nine lawmakers were Ramani Raya, Govinda Chaudhary, Dan Bahadur Chaudhary, Chandan Shah, Salauddin Musalman, Sabitri Devi Yadav, Arbinda Sah and Urmila Mahato.

The party joined the Baburam Bhattarai government in September 2011 with two ministers and two ministers of state. The ministers from the party resigned on 4 May 2012 to make way for a national unity government. Party co-chair Hridayesh Tripathi was appointed as a cabinet minister the next day.

The party won 11 seats to the 2nd Nepalese Constituent Assembly at the 2013 election. On 21 April 2017 the party merged with Sadbhavana Party, Nepal Sadbhawana Party, Terai Madhes Sadbhawana Party, Madhesi Janaadhikar Forum (Republican) and Rastriya Madhesh Samajwadi Party to form Rastriya Janata Party Nepal.

== Ideology ==
The party was created to fight for the right to self-determination of Madheshi people in the Terai region of Nepal. The party split on ideological lines with Mahendra Raya Yadav forming the Terai Madhesh Loktantrik Party Nepal. Party chairman Thakur was a social democrat whereas Yadav was a leftist.

== Organization ==
The party leadership was dominated by the land-owning caste of the region and had limited appeal with the middle and lower castes. After Mahindra Raya Yadav broke away to form the Terai Madhesh Loktantrik Party Nepal most of the party's middle and lower caste members also joined Yadav.

== Portfolios and Central Committee ==
On December 31, 2007, a Central Working Committee of the party was formed, chaired by Mahantha Thakur. Other members are Hridayesh Tripathi, Brikhesh Chandra Lal, Brijesh Kumar Gupta, Mahendra Prasad Yadav, Ram Chandra Raya, Sarbendra Nath Shukla, Anish Ansari, Ram Chandra Kushwaha, Srikrishna Yadav, Govinda Prasad Chaudhary, Ram Kumar Chaudhary, Ram Kumar Sharma, Jitendra Sonal, Bishwanath Saha, Satyawati Kurmi, Kritaram Kumhal, Dilip Singh and Sheikh Chandtara. In 2073, this party conducted its first general convention in Nawalparasi. Presidents of two big democratic parties including Sher Bahadur Deuba from Nepali Congress, Pashupati Shumsher JBR from Rastriya Prajatantra Party were present here.

Chairman-Mahantha Thakur

Co-chairman-Hridayesh Tripathi

General Secretary-Brijesh Kumar Gupta, Jitendra Sonal, Jangi Lal Raya

== Election results ==
Election	Leader	Votes	%	Seats	+/–	Position	Status
2008	Mahantha Thakur	338,930	3.16	21 / 575		5th	CPN (Maoist)–CPN (UML)–MJFN
2013	Mahantha Thakur	181,140	1.91	11 / 575	▼10	▼8th	Congress–CPN (UML)–RPP

== See also ==
- Nepali Congress
- Nepal Loktantrik Forum
- Terai–Madhesh Loktantrik Party
- People's Progressive Party
