= Federal Socialist Party =

Federal Socialist Party, Nepal संघिय समाजवादी पार्टी
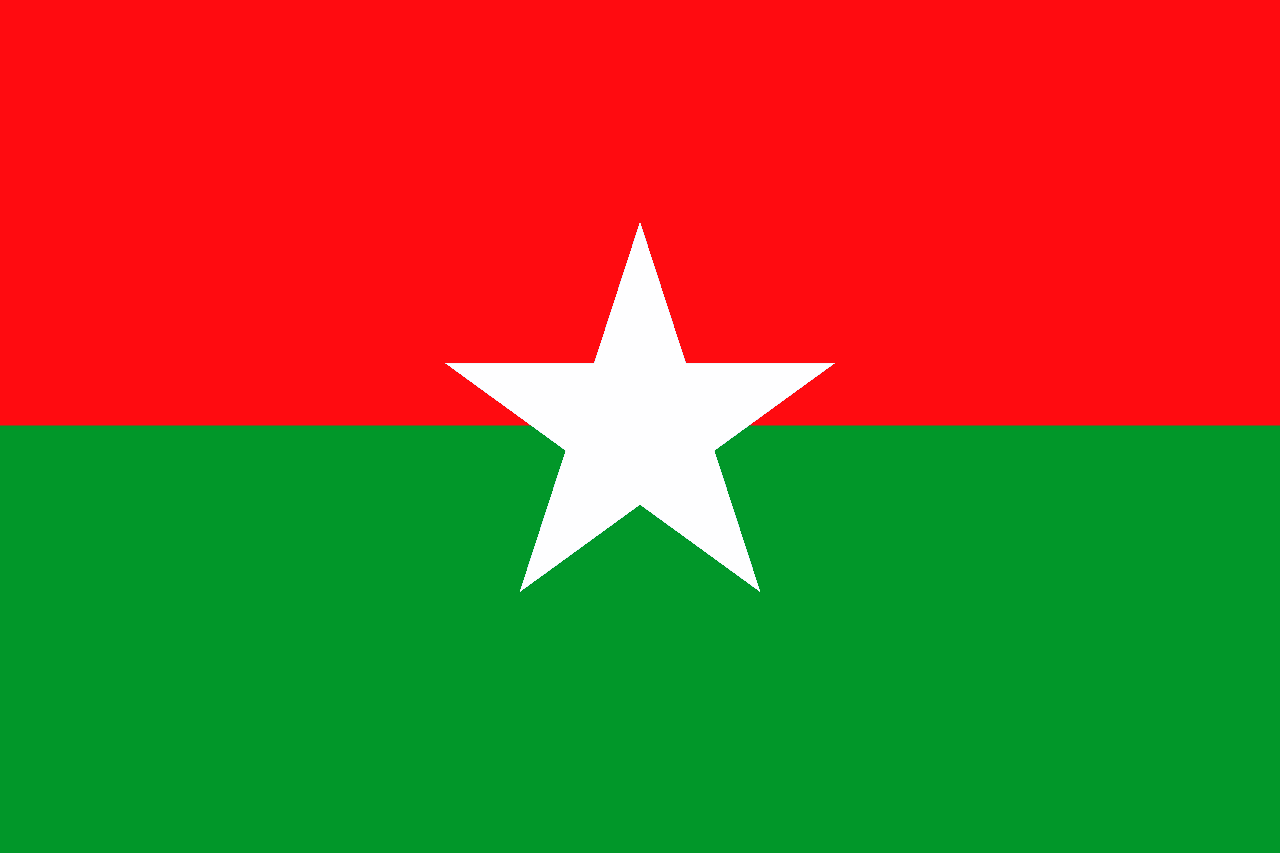
- Leader: Ashok Rai
- Founded: 2012
- Split from: CPN (UML)
- Succeeded by: Federal Socialist Forum, Nepal
- Headquarters: Kathmandu, Nepal
- Youth wing: Federal Youth Federation
- Ideology: Identity based federalism

Federal Socialist Party (Nepali: संघिय समाजवादी पार्टी) was a political party of Nepal led by Ashok Rai formed in 2012.

== History ==
Ashok Rai, who was the vice-chair of CPN (UML) and Rajendra Prasad Shrestha, a central committee member of the party, broke away from the CPN (UML) to form the Federal Socialist Party in November 2012. They accused the CPN (UML) leadership of not listening to the aspirations of Janajati leaders within the party and organized a new party to contest the 2013 Constituent Assembly election. The party failed to get any constituency seats but won five proportional seats to the 2nd Constituent Assembly. The party merged with Madhesi Jana Adhikar Forum, Nepal and Khas Samabesi Party in June 2015 to form the Federal Socialist Forum, Nepal.

== Electoral performance ==
Election	Leader	Votes		Seats	Position	Resulting government
2013	Ashok Kumar Rai	121,274	1.28	5 / 575	11th	Congress-CPN (UML)-RPP
