= Terai Madhes Sadbhavana Party =

Terai Madhesh Sadbhavana Party Nepal तराई मधेश सद्भावना पार्टी नेपाल
- Leader: Mahendra Raya Yadav
- Founded: 2013
- Dissolved: 21 April 2017
- Merger of: Terai Madhesh Loktantrik Party Nepal; Rastriya Sadbhvana Party
- Succeeded by: Rastriya Janata Party Nepal

The Terai Madhesh Sadbhavana Party Nepal (Nepali: तराई मधेश सद्भावना पार्टी) was a political party in Nepal from 2013 to 2017. It was led by Mahendra Raya Yadav. It was formed through the merger of Terai Madhesh Loktantrik Party Nepal, a splinter group of Terai Madhesh Loktantrik Party and Rastriya Sadbhavana Party, a splinter group of Sadbhavana Party.

The Terai Madhes Sadbhavana Party won 3 seats in the 2013 Nepalese Constituent Assembly election.

On 21 April 2017 the party merged with Tarai Madhes Loktantrik Party, Nepal Sadbhawana Party, Sadbhavana Party, Madhesi Janaadhikar Forum (Republican) and Rastriya Madhesh Samajwadi Party to form Rastriya Janata Party Nepal.

== Electoral performance ==
| Election | Leader | Votes | | Seats | Position | Resulting government |
| Election | Leader | # | % | # | Position | Resulting government |
|---|---|---|---|---|---|---|
| 2013 | Mahendra Raya Yadav | 62,746 | 0.66 | 3 / 575 | 17th | Congress–CPN (UML)–RPP |
