= Federal Socialist Forum, Nepal =

Federal Socialist Forum, Nepal संघीय समाजवादी फोरम, नेपाल
- Abbreviation: FSFN
- Chairperson: Upendra Yadav; Rajendra Prasad Shrestha
- General Secretary: Ram Sahay Yadav
- Founded: 15 June 2015 (11 years ago)
- Dissolved: 6 May 2019
- Merger of: Madheshi Jana Adhikar Forum, Nepal; Federal Socialist Party Nepal; Khas Samabeshi Party
- Succeeded by: Samajbadi Party, Nepal
- Headquarters: Tinkune, Kathmandu, Nepal
- Youth wing: Federal Youth Union
- Student Wing: Socialist Student's Forum
- Women's Wing: Federal Socialist Women's Forum
- Teacher's Wing: Federal Nepal Teachers' Union
- Ideology: Democratic socialism Secularism; Progressivism; Ethnic federalism
- Political position: Centre-left to left-wing

Election symbol

Party flag
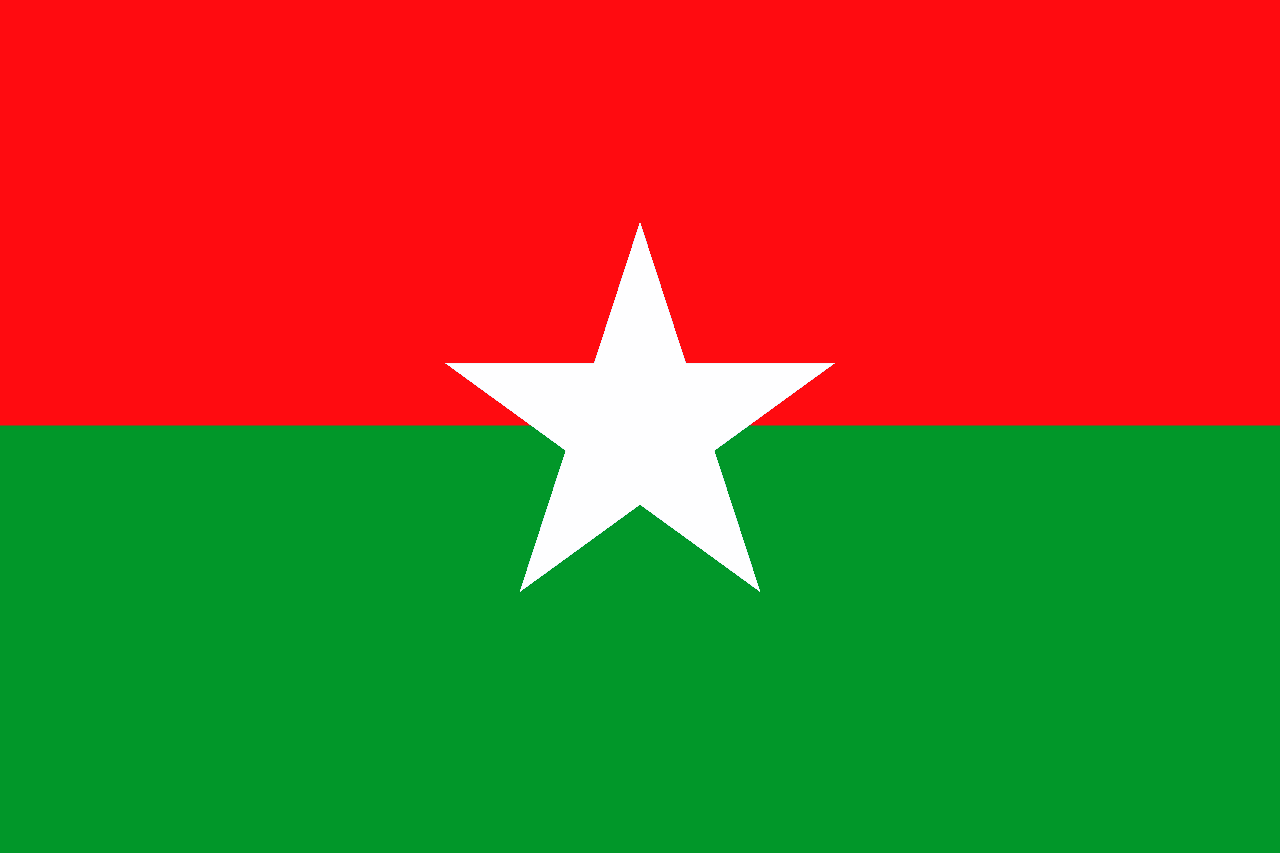

Website
- federalsocialist.org

The Federal Socialist Forum, Nepal (Nepali: संघीय समाजवादी फोरम, नेपाल; abbreviated FSFN) was a democratic socialist political party in Nepal. The party came into being on 15 June 2015 with the merger of the Madhesi Jana Adhikar Forum, Nepal, the Federal Socialist Party Nepal and the Khas Samabeshi Party. On 6 May 2019, the party merged with Naya Shakti Party, Nepal to form Samajbadi Party, Nepal.

== History ==
=== Foundation ===
On 14 June 2015 the Madhesi Jana Adhikar Forum, Nepal, the Federal Socialist Party Nepal and the Khas Samabeshi Party announced that they were to merge on 15 June 2015 to intensify their efforts to revive the fast “fading” Madhesi and Janajati movement in the country. The party was formed with Upendra Yadav and Rajendra Shrestha as co-chairs and Ashok Rai as the parliamentary party leader. The new party had a total strength of 15 in the 2nd Nepalese Constituent Assembly following the merger (10 from MJF-N and 5 from FSPN).

On 19 June 2017, Sarita Giri-led Nepal Sadbhawana Party decided to merge with the party.

=== Local elections ===
On 27 February, the party announced that it would be participating in the first phase of the local elections to be held on May 14, going back on their previous decision to not participate until the constitution was amended. They also announced an alliance with Naya Shakti Party, Nepal led by former Prime Minister Baburam Bhattarai, announcing that they would field common candidates and share the same electoral symbol in the upcoming elections. Following this decision party co-chair Upendra Yadav was removed as head of the Federal Alliance and the party was removed from the alliance. The party did not win any seats in the first of the local elections. In the second phase of the election however, 382 candidates from the party were elected, including 8 in mayoral posts.

The party broke its alliance with Naya Shakti before the third phase of the elections after failing to merge the two parties. 1,057 candidates from the party were elected, the party won in 26 mayoral posts including a win in Birgunj.

=== Legislative and provincial elections ===
The party announced an alliance with Rastriya Janata Party, Nepal before the elections. The party won 16 seats to the House of Representatives and finished with the fifth highest vote count in proportional representation. The party was one of five parties to be declared "national parties".

In the provincial assembly elections, the party won 3 seats in Province No. 1, 29 seats in Province No. 2 and 5 seats in Lumbini Province. Following the election, FSFN and Rastriya Janata Party announced that they would form a coalition government in Province No. 2, with FSFN getting the post of Chief Minister and RJPN getting the post of Speaker. Mohammad Lalbabu Raut who was parliamentary party leader in the provincial assembly was appointed as the Chief Minister of Province No. 2.

== Ideology ==
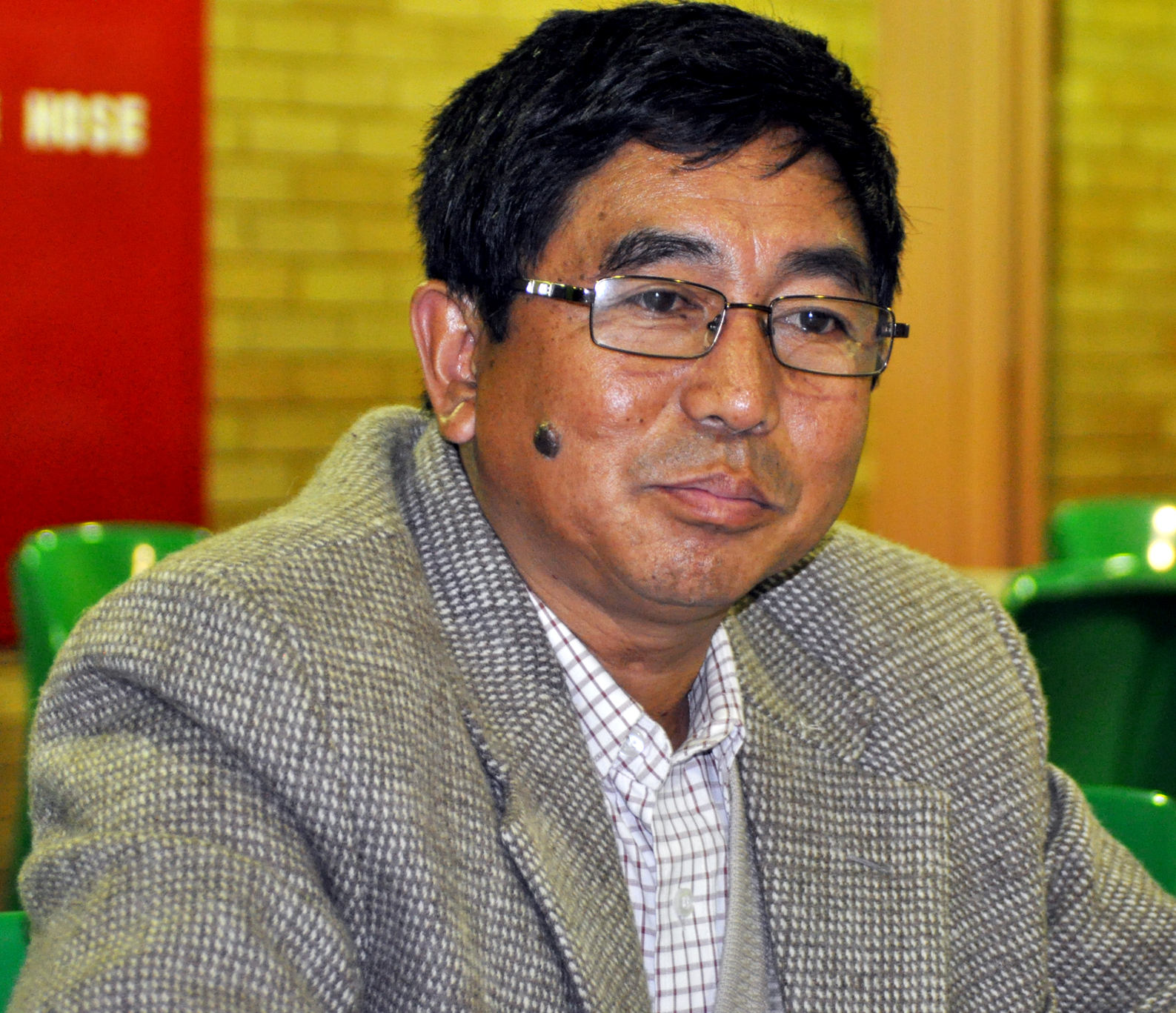
Ashok Rai, the senior leader of the party.

The party in its manifesto has expressed support for identity-based federalism and socialism. The party has stated that it would also end discrimination and suffering based on ethnicity, language, gender and regional status. The manifesto also reads that the party was formed in view of the need for an alternate national force to implement the progressive agendas including rights of ethnic groups, identity, federalism, republic, secularism, inclusive democracy, autonomy, good governance, proportional system, and social justice and security.

== Electoral performance ==
Election	Leader	Votes		Seats	Position	Resulting government
2017	Upendra Yadav	470,201	4.93	16 / 275	5th	CPN (UML)-CPN (Maoist Centre)

== Presence in various provinces ==
Province	Seats	Year of election
Province No. 1	3 / 93	2017
Province No. 2	29 / 107	2017
Lumbini Province	5 / 87	2017

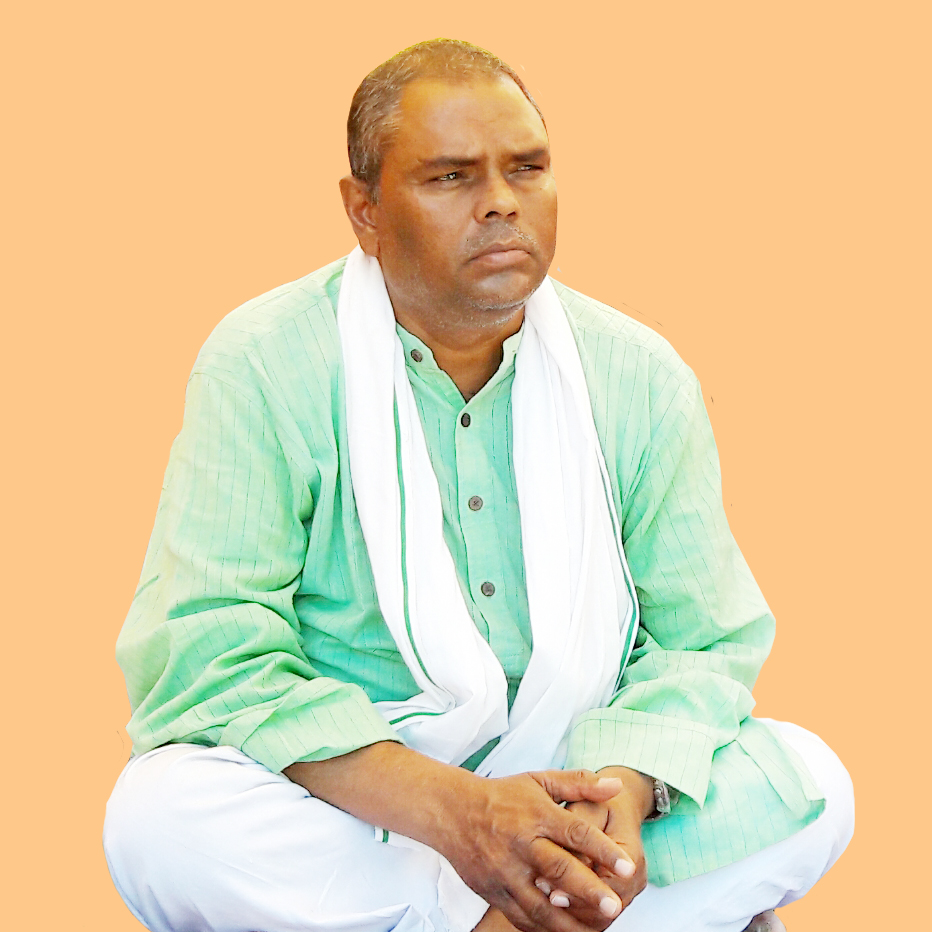
Upendra Yadav, chairman of the party

== Leadership ==
=== Chairmen of Federal Socialist Forum, Nepal ===
- Upendra Yadav (2015-2019)

== List of chief ministers ==
=== Province No. 2 ===
Name	Portrait	Terms in office
Mohammad Lalbabu Raut		2018–present

== See also ==
- List of political parties in Nepal
- People's Socialist Party (Nepal)
- Nepal Sadbhawana Party
- Samajbadi Party, Nepal
