= Rajendra Prasad Shrestha =

Nepali politician

- राजेन्द्र प्रसाद श्रेष्ठ

Minister of Federal Affairs and General Administration
- In office 8 October 2021 – 14 October 2022
- President: Bidya Devi Bhandari
- Prime Minister: Sher Bahadur Deuba
- Preceded by: Ganesh Singh Thagunna
- Succeeded by: Aman Lal Modi

Member of Parliament, Pratinidhi Sabha for Federal Socialist Forum party list
- In office 4 March 2018 – 2022

Member of Parliament, Pratinidhi Sabha
- In office October 1994 – May 1999
- Preceded by: Krishna Gopal Shrestha
- Succeeded by: Mangal Siddhi Manandhar
- Constituency: Kathmandu 5

Personal details
- Born: 30 March 1960 (age 66)
- Party: People's Socialist Party
- Other political affiliations: CPN (Fourth Convention); CPN (ML); CPN (UML); Federal Socialist Party; Federal Socialist Forum

Rajendra Prasad Shrestha is a Nepalese politician, belonging to the People's Socialist Party(PSP), and former Minister of The Housing and Physical Planning in a coalition government led by Prime Minister Girija Prasad Koirala and Federal Affairs and General Administration in a coalition led by Sher Bahadur Deuwa. He was elected to the House of Representatives from Kathmandu 5 in the 1994 general election, representing the Communist Party of Nepal (Unified Marxist–Leninist) and in the First Federal Parliament as a member of House of Representatives from Proportional Representation in 2017.

He is the Federal Council Chairperson of the People's Socialist Party (PSP). and a scholar who propounded the concept of Federal Socialism in 2012 with the slogan "Federalism for the emancipation of oppressed nationalities and socialism for the emancipation of working class".

This political ideology was the basis for the unification of the political forces that set up the People's Socialist Party, Nepal. The guiding principle of the PSPN is Enhanced Federal Socialism.

== See also ==
- People's Socialist Party
