= Madheshi people =

Indo-Aryan Nepalese ethnic group in Terai-Madhesh

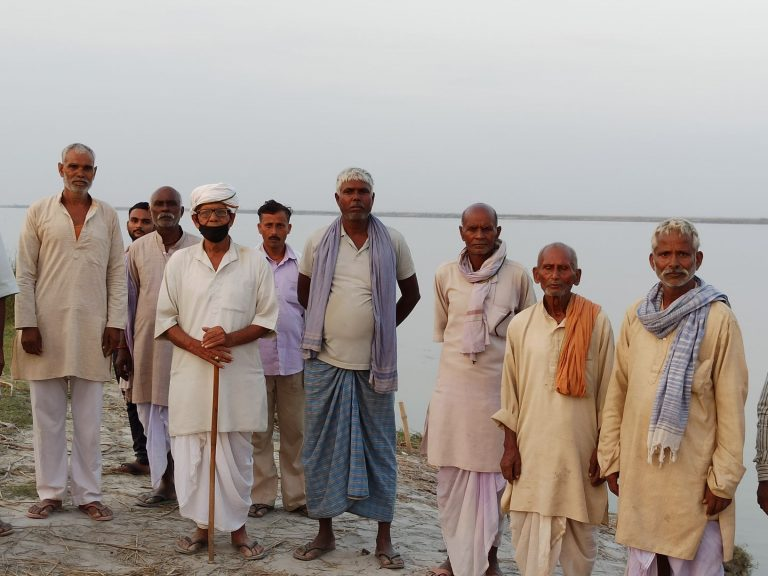

Total population
- 13,318,705

Regions with significant populations
- Predominantly southeastern Nepal

Languages
- Maithili · Bhojpuri · Bajjika · Urdu · Awadhi · Kewat

Religion
- Hinduism · Islam · Christianity

Madheshi people (Nepali: मधेशी) is a term used for several ethnic groups in Nepal living in the Terai region of Nepal. It has also been used as a political pejorative term by the Pahari people of Nepal to refer to Nepalis with a non-Nepali language as their mother tongue, regardless of their place of birth or residence. The term Madheshi became a widely recognised name for Nepali citizens with an Indian cultural background only after 1990.

Madheshi people comprise various cultural groups such as Hindu caste groups, Muslims, Marwaris, Brahmin and Dalit people, ethnic groups like Maithils, Bhojpuri, Awadhi and Bajjika speaking people and indigenous people of the Terai. Many of these groups share cultural traditions, educational and family ties with people living south of the international border in the Indian states of Bihar, Uttar Pradesh and West Bengal. Tharu people and Pahari people living in the Terai do not consider themselves as Madheshi.

== Etymology ==
The word madhesh is thought to be derived from the Sanskrit madhya desh (मध्य देश), literally the middle country, which refers to "the central region, the country lying between the Himalaya and the Vindhya Range". However, in the context of Nepal, Madhesh refers to the Madhesh Province in the Nepal Terai located south of the Siwalik Hills.

== History ==
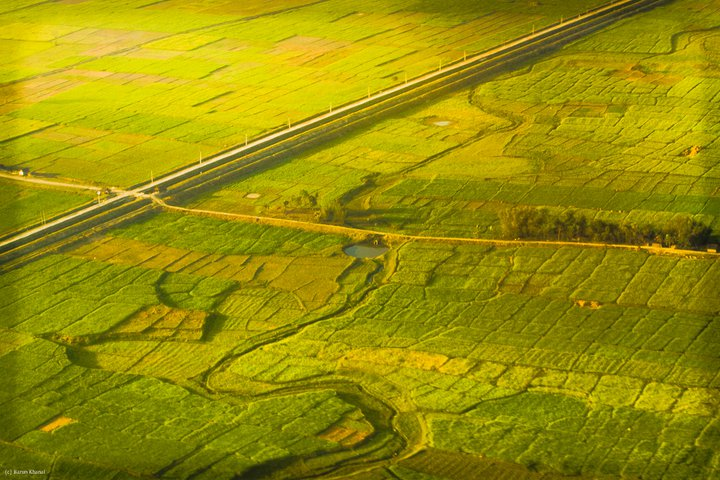
An agricultural field in Terai

Since the late 18th century, the Shah rulers of Nepal promoted conversion of forests in the Terai to agricultural land and encouraged people from northern India to settle in this region through a series of subsidies granted to new settlers. In the 1770s to 1780s, famine-stricken Bihari farmers migrated to the Nepal Terai following a severe flood of the Koshi River and subsequent drought. To promote the economic development of the Nepal Terai, people from the hills were invited to settle, but only a few moved to the Terai. Between the 1860s and 1951, people from India immigrated and settled in the region. Immigration of Indian farmers and labourers was particularly high during the rule of the Rana dynasty between 1846 and 1950. They settled foremost in the Terai together with already present native Terai peoples like Tharus, Rajbanshis and Dhimals. This increased immigration facilitated the expansion of cultivated land, which provided revenue for the state in the form of taxes by farmers, duties for felling and export of timber, and fees for the grazing of cattle on pastures during dry seasons. In the mid 19th century, Muslim people from the Awadh region were invited to settle in the far-western Nepal Terai, where they received large forested areas for conversion to agriculture. People of at least 21 Indian ethnic groups immigrated between 1933 and 1966.

In 1952, a Nepal Citizenship Act was passed that entitled all those immigrants to obtain Nepali citizenship who had stayed in the Madhesh for at least five years or married to native Madhesis. The Citizenship Act of 1963 entitled immigrants to receive Nepali citizenship if they were able to read and write Nepali and engaged in business. In 1981, the Indian Ministry of Foreign Affairs estimated that about 3.2 million people of Indian origin lived in Nepal, of which about 2.4 million had received Nepali citizenship. In 2006, the Nepal Citizenship Act was amended to the effect that people born before 1990 and residing permanently in the country obtained the right to Nepali citizenship. About 2.3 million people received citizenship certificates. The Constitution of Nepal 2015 contains provisions for a Nepali citizenship by naturalisation, which can be acquired by:

- foreign women who are married to a Nepali man.
- children of a Nepali woman and a foreign man.

=== Demographics of the Nepal Terai ===
With 33,998.8 km^{2} (13,127.0 sq mi), the Nepal Terai constitutes 23.1% of Nepal's land area. As of 2001, about 48.5% of Nepal's population lived in the Terai, which had a population density of 330.78/km^{2} (856.7/sq mi), the highest in the country. As of June 2011, the Nepal Terai's human population totaled 13,318,705 people comprising more than 120 different ethnic groups and castes.

The Madheshi people constituted 32% of Nepal's population by the 1991 census. Of these, 16% belonged to various Hindu castes, 9% belonged to other ethnic groups, including 6.5% Tharu people.

== Culture ==
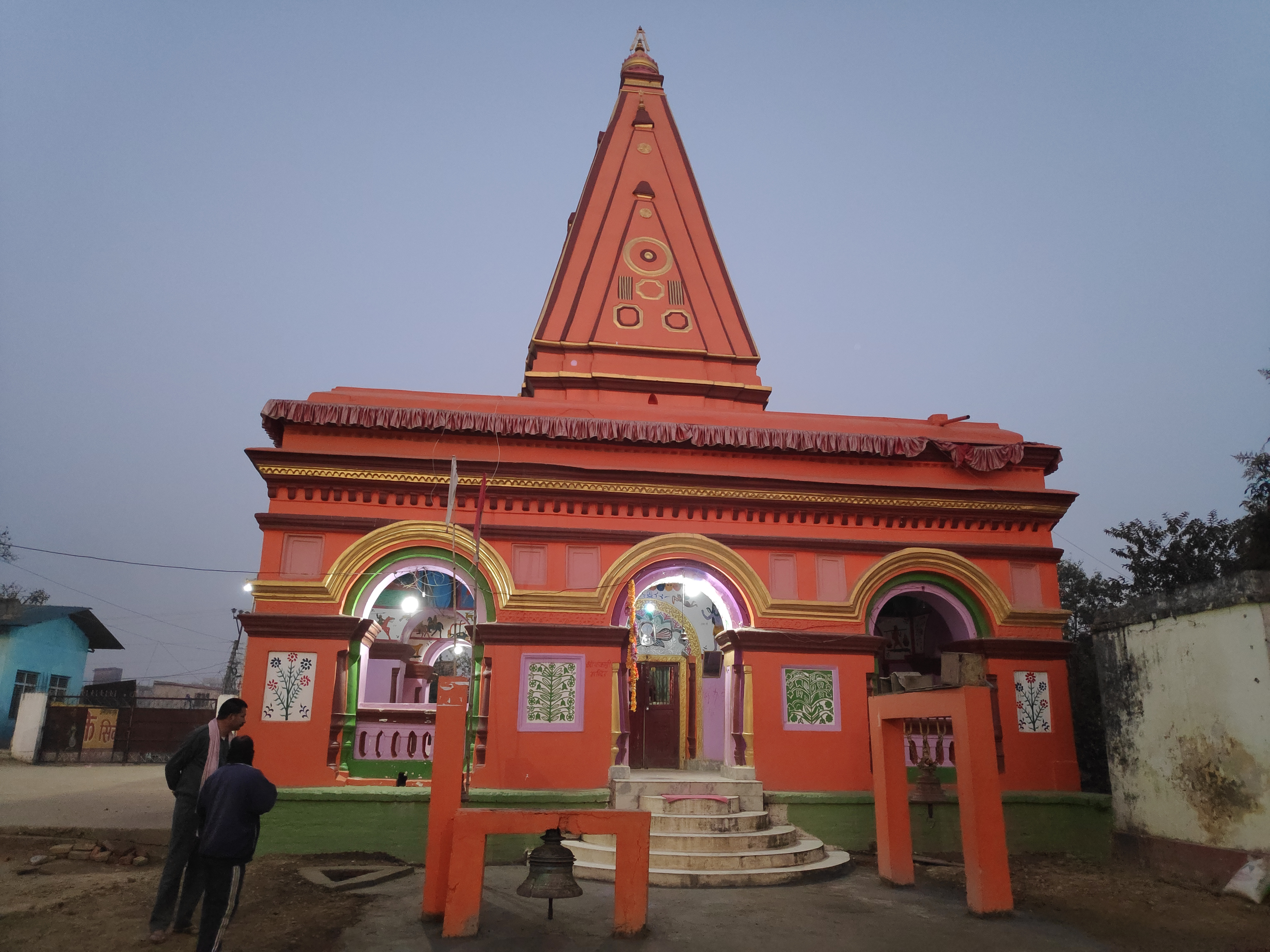
A temple in Simraungadh

The culture of Madeshi people is complex and diverse. The Muslim and indigenous peoples speak their own languages and have distinct cultural traditions that differ from the Hindu caste groups. Latter comprise at least 43 distinct groups. Caste groups include Bania, Brahman, Dhobi, Kalawar, Kewat, Kshatriya, Kumhar, Kurmi, Kushwaha and Teli.

Muslim people in the Terai constitute about 96% of all Muslims in the country. Their cultural traditions are interlinked with those of Muslim people in northern India; popular destinations for their ziyarat pilgrimage are the shrines of Ajmer Sharif Dargah and Ghazi Saiyyad Salar Masud in Rajasthan and Uttar Pradesh, respectively. They are influenced by the hierarchy of the Hindu caste system, with the difference that it is not based on the principle of pollution and purity, but on occupation.

Both Muslim and Hindu Madheshi parents place more emphasis on the education of boys than of girls. Despite an increase of schools and primary education being compulsory and free of cost, more boys than girls are enrolled. Girls are expected to look after younger siblings and do household chores. Many rural Madheshi girls are married at an age of 14 to 16 years.

=== Languages ===
Madheshi people speak Maithili, Bhojpuri, Bajjika, Urdu and Awadhi languages. The National Population and Housing Census of 2011 knows of 123 languages spoken in all of Nepal and lists:

- 3,092,530 Maithili speaking people (11.7% of Nepal's total population), of which 3,004,245 lived in the Terai;
- 1,584,958 Bhojpuri speaking people (5.98%), of which 1,542,333 lived in the Terai;
- 793,418 Bajjika speaking people (2.99%), including 791,737 in the Terai;
- 691,546 Urdu-speaking people (2.61%), including 671,851 in the Terai.

Muslim Madheshis speak Urdu primarily, but also Awadhi, Bhojpuri, Bajjika and Maithili, depending on whether they live in the western, central or eastern Terai.

=== Religions ===
The following religions are practised in the Terai according to the National Population and Housing Census of 2011:

- Hinduism with 11,308,620 followers
- Islam with 1,105,533 followers
- Buddhism with 472,469 followers
- Kirat with 190,458 followers
- Christianity with 137,723 followers
- Prakriti with 63,747 followers
- Jainism with 2,169 followers
- Bon with 1,379 followers, less than 900 followers of the Baháʼí Faith and less than 500 Sikhs.

The religious practices of the majority of Madheshi people are a mixture of orthodox Hinduism and animism.

Muslim Madheshis practise the traditional nikah marriage, which is recognised by law. The largest and oldest madrasa is located in Krishnanagar. Mawlawis teaching Quran and Hadith at madrasas in the Terai are either from India, or were trained in India and Saudi Arabia. Many Muslim Madheshis practise endogamy.

=== Cuisine ===
In 1989, a study on food consumption patterns was conducted with 108 people in a village in Chitwan district. Results of this study showed that the people consumed seven food items on average. Rice constituted almost half of their daily food intake, supplemented by vegetables, potatoes, milk and dairy products. Less frequently they consumed meat, fish, eggs and fruit. About 13.7% of the total food intake of men was alcohol, whereas females consumed far less alcohol. Fruit commonly grown in the Terai include mango, lychee, papaya, guava, banana and jackfruit.

== Politics ==
Since the late 1940s, the term 'Madhes' was used by politicians in the Nepal Terai to differentiate between the interests of the people of the Terai and of the hills. At the time, Indian and Madheshi people needed a passport to travel to Kathmandu, a requirement in place until 1958. In the 1950s, the regional political party Nepal Terai Congress advocated more autonomy for the Terai, recognition of Hindi as a national language and increasing employment opportunities for Madheshi people. During 1961 to 1990, the Panchayat government enforced a policy of assimilating diverse cultural groups into a pan-Nepali identity. Legal directives made it an offense to address inequality and discrimination of ethnic groups. The complexities of ethnopolitical conflicts between immigrants, caste groups and indigenous groups living in the Terai were not addressed.

After the Panchayat regime was abolished following the People's Movement in spring 1990, disadvantaged groups demanded a more equitable share of political resources such as admittance to civil service. Madheshi people are disadvantaged in regards to access to education; literacy rate among Madheshi people is lower than among other groups in Nepal, and lowest among Madheshi Dalits. They are also disappointed to have been excluded from participation in bureaucracy, Nepal Army and political parties in Nepal. Madheshi identity is largely based on the experience of being discriminated by the country's ruling elites.

The Nepal Sadbhawana Party is the oldest Madheshi party, which started lobbying for socio-cultural, linguistic and political rights of Madheshi people in the 1990s. The discussions on rights and demands of Madheshi people increased after the end of the Nepalese Civil War, in particular among Madheshi intellectuals and political elites. The political parties Janatantrik Terai Mukti Morcha and Madhesi Jana Adhikar Forum, Nepal advocated the idea of an autonomous Madhes province stretching all over the Terai and organised violent demonstrations in 2007 to enforce their demands. The United Democratic Madhesi Front formed by Madheshi organizations pressured the government to accept this concept of autonomy under the motto "One Madhes One Pradesh". Several ethnic and religious groups in the Terai opposed and resisted this policy under the leadership of Madheshi parties, foremost Tharu and Muslim people.

The Tharu people were initially comfortable with the Madheshi identity in the eastern part of the Terai as of 2007, but in the central part, they claim a distinct Tharu identity. In 2009, they disassociated themselves from being identified as Madheshi and demanded their own province.

Armed groups like Terai Army, Madhesi National Liberation Front, Terai Cobras and Madhesh Mukti Tigers pursued this aim of autonomy using violent means. Some members of these organisations were responsible for acts of terrorism including bombings and murders. The Alliance for Independent Madhesh also demands independence of the Terai.

In 2013, more than 24 Madheshi political parties were registered for the Constituent Assembly of Nepal election. Madheshi parties gained 50 of 575 seats in the Constituent Assembly.

=== Indian influence ===
After the 2008 Nepalese Constituent Assembly election, Indian politicians kept on trying to secure strategic interests in the Nepal Terai, such as over hydropower energy, development projects, business and trade. It has been alleged that by supporting the 2015 Nepal blockade, India tried to dominate Nepal's internal politics and foment the conflict in the Nepal Terai.

== See also ==
- Demographics of Nepal
- Great Bengal famine of 1770

== Bibliography ==
- Miklian, J. (2009). Nepal's Terai: Constructing an Ethnic Conflict. South Asia Briefing Paper #1 (PDF). Oslo: International Peace Research Institute. ISBN 978-82-7288-309-5.
- Hachhethu, K. (2007). "Madheshi nationalism and restructuring the Nepali state". International Seminar on Constitutionalism and Diversity in Nepal. Tribhuvan University, Kathmandu: Centre for Nepal and Asian Studies. pp. 1–12.
- Kabir, H. (2013). Education, Nationalism, and Conflict in Plural Society in Nepal: Terai Region in the Post-Maoist Context. Discussion Paper Series. Vol. 19. Hiroshima: Hiroshima University Partnership Project for Peace Building and Capacity Development.
- Kabir, H. (2012). The rise of new regional political force in Madhes and its consequence in post-conflict Nepal. Discussion Paper Series. Vol. 15. Hiroshima: Hiroshima University Partnership Project for Peace Building and Capacity Development.
