= Sadbhavana Party =

Sadbhavana Party सद्भावना पार्टी
- President: Rajendra Mahato
- General Secretary: Manish Kumar Suman
- Spokesperson: Santosh Kumar Mehta
- Founded: 2007
- Dissolved: 21 April 2017
- Succeeded by: Rastriya Janata Party Nepal
- Headquarters: Lakhechaur Marg, New Baneshwor, Kathmandu
- Student wing: Student Front
- Youth wing: Sadhbhawana Youth Front
- Labour wing: Madheshi Trade Union Federation
- Ideology: Federalism; Participatory democracy Patriotism
- Political position: Centre-left
- International affiliation: Socialist International, Progressive Alliance

Election symbol

Sadbhavana Party is a political party in Nepal. The party emerged from a major split in the Nepal Sadbhavana Party (Anandidevi) in the summer of 2007. Laxman Lal Karna was the joint chair of the party.

== History ==
Initially the party used the name "Nepal Sadbhavana Party (Anandidevi)", but the party was not recognised by the Election Commission of Nepal by that name. Rajendra Mahato, Minister for Industry and Commerce, resigned from the government in protest. The party was later registered with the Election Commission of Nepal ahead of the 2008 Constituent Assembly election as Sadbhavana Party.

The party was a founding member of the United Democratic Madhesi Front along with Madheshi Janaadhikar Forum, Nepal and Terai Madhesh Democratic Party. The front was a key part of the second Madhes movement and demanded that the Interim Constitution should include federalism, proportional representation and population-based constituency demarcation.

=== Constituent Assembly and dissolution ===
In the elections the party gained nine seats to the 1st Constituent Assembly. Sadbhavana Party joined the government led by CPN (Maoist) with party president Rajendra Mahato joining the cabinet as Minister for Commerce and Supplies. In August 2011, Anil Kumar Jha split the party with five CA members and formed Sanghiya Sadbhavana Party. Later Ram Naresh Rae split the party with two CA members and formed Rastriya Sadbhavana Party.

In the 2013 Constituent Assembly election, the party won six seats to the 2nd Constituent Assembly. The party reformed the United Democratic Madhesi Front with other Madhes-based parties in 2015 against the proposed constitution blaming the major political parties of not implementing agreements between them in the past. The protests continued after the constitution was passed by the house resulting in a prolonged agitation in Madhes.

On 21 April 2017 the party merged with Tarai Madhes Loktantrik Party, Nepal Sadbhawana Party, Terai Madhes Sadbhawana Party, Madhesi Janaadhikar Forum (Republican) and Rastriya Madhesh Samajwadi Party to form Rastriya Janata Party Nepal.

== Electoral performance ==
Election	Leader	Votes		Seats		Position	Resulting government
Election	Leader	#	%	#	+/-	Position	Resulting government
2008	Rajendra Mahato and Laxman Lal Karna	167,517	1.56	9 / 575		8th	Maoist–CPN (UML)–MJFN–Sadbhavana
2013	Rajendra Mahato and Laxman Lal Karna	133,271	1.41	6 / 575	▼3	▼9th	Congress–CPN (UML)–RPP

== See also ==
- People's Progressive Party
