= Sarlahi 3 =

Parliamentary constituency in Nepal

- Parliamentary constituency
- Sarlahi 3 in Madhesh Province
- Province: Madhesh Province
- District: Sarlahi District
- Electorate: 134,412
- Major settlements: Haripurwa; Kabilasi

Current constituency
- Created: 1991
- Party: Rastriya Swatantra Party
- Member of Parliament: Narendra Sah Kalwar
- Local levels: Hariwan Municipality; Bagmati Municipality; Chakraghatta Rural Municipality; Haripur Municipality (ward 1); Barahathawa Municipality (wards 5–12 and 16–18); Kabilasi Municipality (wards 3–6); Basbariya Rural Municipality (wards 4–6)

Sarlahi 3 is one of four parliamentary constituencies of Sarlahi District in Nepal. This constituency came into existence on the Constituency Delimitation Commission (CDC) report submitted on 31 August 2017.

== Incorporated areas ==
Sarlahi 3 incorporates Hariwan Municipality, Bagmati Municipality, Chakraghatta Rural Municipality, ward 1 of Haripur Municipality, wards 5–12 and 16–18 of Barahathawa Municipality, wards 3–6 of Kabilasi Municipality and wards 4–6 of Basbariya Rural Municipality.

== Assembly segments ==
It encompasses the following Madhesh Provincial Assembly segment

- Sarlahi 3(A)
- Sarlahi 3(B)

== Members of Parliament ==
=== Parliament/Constituent Assembly ===
Election	Member	Party
1991	Ram Hari Joshi	Nepali Congress
1999	Ram Chandra Raya	Rastriya Prajatantra Party
2008	Sumitra Devi Raya Yadav	Terai Madhesh Loktantrik Party
December 2010	Sumitra Devi Raya Yadav	Terai Madhesh Loktantrik Party Nepal
2013	Hari Prasad Upreti	CPN (Unified Marxist–Leninist)
2017	Rameshwar Raya Yadav	CPN (Maoist Centre)
May 2018	Rameshwar Raya Yadav	Nepal Communist Party
2026	Narendra Sah Kalwar	Rastriya Swatantra Party

=== Provincial Assembly ===
==== 3(A) ====
Election	Member	Party
2017	Dilli Prasad Upreti	CPN (Unified Marxist–Leninist)
May 2018	Dilli Prasad Upreti	Nepal Communist Party
March 2021	Dilli Prasad Upreti	CPN (Unified Marxist–Leninist)
August 2021	Dilli Prasad Upreti	CPN (Unified Socialist)

==== 3(B) ====
Election	Member	Party
2017	Sanjay Kumar Yadav	Federal Socialist Forum, Nepal
May 2019	Sanjay Kumar Yadav	Samajbadi Party, Nepal
April 2020	Sanjay Kumar Yadav	People's Socialist Party, Nepal

== Election results ==
=== Election in the 2020s ===
==== 2026 general election ====
Candidate	Party	Votes	%
Narendra Sah Kalwar	Rastriya Swatantra Party	46,890	60.24
Narayan Kaji Shrestha	Nepali Communist Party	13,338	17.14
Binod Kumar Khanal	Nepali Congress	6,624	8.51
Hari Prasad Upreti	CPN (UML)	5,776	7.42
Tribhuwan Kumar Singh	Ujyaalo Nepal Party	2,622	3.37
Jay Prakash Raya	Janata Samajbadi Party, Nepal	766	0.98
Dholram Barkoti	Rastriya Prajatantra Party	478	0.61
Bir Bahadur Rumba	Mongol National Organisation	267	0.34
Sunil Prasad Gupta	Janamat Party	260	0.33
Krishna Nandan Raya	Independent	154	0.20
Shivadayal Mahara	Bahujan Samaj Party of Nepal	151	0.19
Sabiul Shesh	Pragatisheel Loktantrik Party	144	0.18
Others		368	0.47
Total		77,838	100.00
Valid votes		77,838	94.82
Invalid/blank votes		4,248	5.18
Total votes		82,086	100.00
Registered voters/turnout		134,412	61.07
Majority		33,552	
Rastriya Swatantra Party gain			

==== 2022 general electionn ====
Candidate	Party	Votes	%
Hari Prasad Upreti	CPN (UML)	32,938	42.67
Narendra Sah Kalwar	CPN (Maoist Centre)	32,168	41.67
Tribhuwan Kumar Singh	Janamat Party	5,519	7.15
Pancha Bahadur Singtan	Rastriya Swatantra Party	3,566	4.62
Raj Kumar Paswan	Bahujan Ekata Party Nepal	1,115	1.44
Others		1,893	2.45
Total		77,199	100.00
Majority		770	
CPN (UML) gain			

=== Election in the 2010s ===
==== 2017 legislative elections ====
Party	Candidate	Votes
CPN (Maoist Centre)	Rameshwar Raya Yadav	22,367
Nepali Congress	Haresh Prasad Mahato	14,929
Independent	Narendra Sah Kalwar	12,086
Federal Socialist Forum, Nepal	Ashok Kumar Singh	10,834
Patriotic People's Republican Front Nepal	Bidur Prasad Kharel	1,036
Others		2,455
Invalid votes		3,623
Result	Maoist Centre gain	
Source: Election Commission

==== 2017 Nepalese provincial elections ====
===== 3(A) =====
Party	Candidate	Votes
CPN (Unified Marxist-Leninist)	Dilli Prasad Upreti	20,246
Nepali Congress	Kapil Muni Mailali	20237
Rastriya Janata Party Nepal	Kusum Kumar Mahato	507
Others		1,323
Invalid votes		1,508
Result	CPN (UML) gain	
Source: Election Commission

===== 3(B) =====
Party	Candidate	Votes
Federal Socialist Forum, Nepal	Sanjay Kumar Yadav	11,368
Nepali Congress	Krishna Dev Yadav	9,297
CPN (Maoist Centre)	Ram Babu Prasad Singh	5,979
Independent	Nawal Kishor Raya Yadav	1,991
Others		1,498
Invalid votes		1,298
Result	FSFN gain	
Source: Election Commission

==== 2013 Constituent Assembly election ====
Party	Candidate	Votes
CPN (Unified Marxist–Leninist)	Hari Prasad Upreti	12,808
UCPN (Maoist)	Bharat Kumar Thapa	9,101
Madheshi Janaadhikar Forum, Nepal	Ashok Kumar Singh	5,059
Nepali Congress	Mina Pandey	4,288
Terai Madhesh Loktantrik Party	Rambabu Raya Yadav	3,502
Terai Madhesh Sadbhavna Party	Kiran Kumari Raya Yadav	2,095
Sadbhavana Party	Baliram Chaudhary	1,252
Madheshi Janaadhikar Forum, Nepal (Democratic)	Rambali Raya	1,233
Others		3,265
Result	CPN (UML) gain	
Source: NepalNews

=== Election in the 2000s ===
==== 2008 Constituent Assembly election ====
Party	Candidate	Votes
Terai Madhesh Loktantrik Party	Sumitra Devi Raya Yadav	11,868
CPN (Unified Marxist–Leninist)	Hari Prasad Upreti	10,587
CPN (Maoist)	Kedar Bahadur Khatri	7,015
Nepali Congress	Hares Prasad Mahato	5,043
Sadbhavana Party	Vaidya Nath Mahato Koiri	5,039
Dalit Janajati Party	Raja Ram Paswan	2,829
Janamorcha Nepal	Achyutam Prasad Kafle	2,672
Chure Bhawar Rastriya Ekta Party Nepal	Aita Singh Dimdum	1,933
CPN (Unified)	Chitra Bahadur Ale Magar	1,018
Others		4,292
Invalid votes		4,414
Result	TMLP gain	
Source: Election Commission

=== Election in the 1990s ===
==== 1999 legislative elections ====
Party	Candidate	Votes
Rastriya Prajatantra Party	Ram Chandra Raya	14,321
Nepali Congress	Ram Hari Joshi	11,967
Nepal Sadbhawana Party	Ram Bishwas Raya	8,713
CPN (Unified Marxist–Leninist)	Mohammad Rizwan Ansari	8,325
CPN (Marxist–Leninist)	Ram Chandra Prasad Chaudhary	1,739
Others		1,606
Invalid Votes		1,368
Result	RPP gain	
Source: Election Commission

==== 1994 legislative elections ====
Party	Candidate	Votes
Nepali Congress	Ram Hari Joshi	11,286
Nepal Sadbhawana Party	Ram Bishwas Raya	8,727
Rastriya Prajatantra Party	Ram Chandra Raya	7,477
CPN (Unified Marxist–Leninist)	Mohammad Rizwan Ansari	5,755
Independent	Ratna Ranjitkar	4,842
Independent	K. Dev Yadav	2,307
Independent	Jangi Lal Raya	2,056
Others		174
Result	Congress hold	
Source: Election Commission

==== 1991 legislative elections ====
Party	Candidate	Votes
Nepali Congress	Ram Hari Joshi	11,741
Nepal Sadbhawana Party	Ram Bishwas Raya	9,223
Result	Congress gain	

== See also ==
- List of parliamentary constituencies of Nepal
- Sarlahi 1 (constituency)
- Sarlahi 2 (constituency)
- Sarlahi 4 (constituency)
