= Sarlahi 4 =

Parliamentary constituency in Madhesh Province, Nepal

Salahi 4
- Parliamentary constituency
- Sarlahi 4 in Madhesh Province
- Province: Madhesh
- District: Sarlahi District
- Electorate: 121,120
- Major settlements: Godaita; Balara; Barahathawa

Current constituency
- Created: 1991
- Party: Rastriya Swatantra Party
- Member of Parliament: Amresh Kumar Singh
- Local levels: Godaita municipality; Dhankaul Rural Municipality; Ramnagar Rural Municipality; Balara Municipality; Barahathawa Municipality (wards 1–4 and 13–15); Bishnu Rural Municipality (wards 1–4); Basbariya Rural Municipality (wards 1–3)

Sarlahi 4 is one of four parliamentary constituencies of Sarlahi District in Nepal. This constituency came into existence on the Constituency Delimitation Commission (CDC) report submitted on 31 August 2017.

== Incorporated areas ==
Salahi 4 incorporates Godaita municipality, Dhankaul Rural Municipality, Ramnagar Rural Municipality, Balara Municipality, wards 1–4 and 13–15 of Barahathawa Municipality, wards 1–4 of Bishnu Rural Municipality and wards 1–3 of Basbariya Rural Municipality.

== Assembly segments ==
It encompasses the following Province No. 2 Provincial Assembly segment

- Salahi 4(A)
- Salahi 4(B)

== Members of Parliament ==
=== Parliament/Constituent Assembly ===
Election	Member	Party
1991	Vaidya Nath Mahato	CPN (Democratic)
1991	Vaidya Nath Mahato	CPN (United)
1994	Khobhari Raya Yadav	Rastriya Prajatantra Party
1999	Nagendra Kumar Raya	Nepali Congress
2008	Rajendra Mahato	Sadbhavana Party
2013	Mahindra Ray Yadav	Terai Madhesh Sadbhavna Party
April 2017	Mahindra Ray Yadav	Rastriya Janata Party Nepal
2017	Amresh Kumar Singh	Nepali Congress
2022	Amresh Kumar Singh	Independent
2026	Amresh Kumar Singh	Rastriya Swatantra Party

=== Provincial Assembly ===
==== 4(A) ====
Election	Member	Party
2022	Birendra Prasad Singh	Nepali Congress

==== 4(B) ====
Election	Member	Party
2022	Farik Mahato	CPN (Maoist Centre)

== Election results ==
=== Election in the 2020s ===
==== 2026 general election ====
Candidate	Party	Votes	%
Amresh Kumar Singh	Rastriya Swatantra Party	35,688	48.65
Gagan Kumar Thapa	Nepali Congress	22,831	31.13
Amnish Kumar Yadav	CPN (UML)	9,343	12.74
Rakesh Kumar Mishra	Janamat Party	1,572	2.14
Rajnish Raya	Nepali Communist Party	1,401	1.91
Pitambar Singh Kushwaha	Ujyaalo Nepal Party	455	0.62
Harinandan Kumar Ranjan	Bahujan Samaj Party of Nepal	452	0.62
Sachitra Sahni	Independent	410	0.56
Ramcharitra Sahni	Pragatisheel Loktantrik Party	299	0.41
Rameshwor Rae Tadav	Janata Samajbadi Party, Nepal	184	0.25
Gyanendra Prasad Kushwaha	Independent	113	0.15
Others		602	0.82
Total		73,350	100.00
Valid votes		73,350	94.12
Invalid/blank votes		4,581	5.88
Total votes		77,931	100.00
Registered voters/turnout		121,120	64.34
Majority		12,857	
Rastriya Swatantra Party gain			

Total Voters: 1,21,120 · Votes Cast: 77,931 (64.34%) · Valid Votes: 73,350 (94.12%) · Invalid Votes: 4,581 (5.88%)

==== 2022 general election ====
Candidate	Party	Votes	%
Amresh Kumar Singh	Independent	20,017	28.89
Nagendra Kumar	Nepali Congress	18,253	26.35
Madhumala Kumari Yadav	Independent	14,622	21.10
Rakesh Kumar Mishra	People's Socialist Party, Nepal	5,813	8.39
Raja Ram Paswan	Bahujan Ekata Party Nepal	5,158	7.44
Ram Babu Rae	Janamat Party	3,429	4.95
Others		1,991	2.87
Total		69,283	100.00
Majority		1,764	
Independent gain			

2022 Nepalese provincial elections

===== 4(A) =====
Party	Candidate	Votes
Nepali Congress	Birendra Prasad Singh	15,693
CPN (UML)	Rambabu Rae	14,616
Janamat Party	Subalal Ram	1,185
Nepal Janata Party	Mahendra Sahani	456
Invalid votes		
Result	Congress hold	
Source: Election Commission

===== 4(B) =====
Party	Candidate	Votes
CPN (Maoist Centre)	Farik Mahato	8,033
Independent	Anita Devi	7,676
Independent	Shree Chan Raye	2,483
Janamat Party	Sanjaya Kumar Singh	2,182
Bahujan Ekata Party Nepal	Krishna Kumar Kushwaha	1,560
Others		
Invalid votes		
Result	CPN (Maoist Centre) gain	
Source: Election Commission

=== Election in the 2010s ===
==== 2017 legislative elections ====
Party	Candidate	Votes
Nepali Congress	Amresh Kumar Singh	29,675
Rastriya Janata Party Nepal	Rakesh Kumar Mishra	28,136
Others		1,501
Invalid votes		6,128
Result	Congress gain	
Source: Election Commission

==== 2017 Nepalese provincial elections ====
===== 4(A) =====
Party	Candidate	Votes
Nepali Congress	Birendra Prasad Singh	14,242
CPN (Maoist Centre)	Farik Mahato	10,753
Rastriya Janata Party Nepal	Rambabu Raya	6,479
Others		628
Invalid votes		1,479
Result	Congress gain	
Source: Election Commission

===== 4(B) =====
Party	Candidate	Votes
Nepali Congress	Upendra Prasad Kushwaha	11,504
Rastriya Janata Party Nepal	Kedar Nandan Chaudhary	10,756
CPN (Maoist Centre)	Rash Narayan Yadav	4,378
Independent	Googali Raut	2,555
Others		899
Invalid votes		2,059
Result	Congress gain	
Source: Election Commission

==== 2013 Constituent Assembly election ====
Party	Candidate	Votes
Terai Madhesh Sadbhavna Party	Mahendra Raya Yadav	11,534
Sadbhavana Party	Rajendra Mahato	8,790
CPN (Unified Marxist–Leninist)	Ram Narayan Sah	8,348
Madheshi Janaadhikar Forum, Nepal	Ram Chandra Raya Yadav	5,020
Nepali Congress	Laxman Raya	2,605
Rastriya Madhesh Samajbadi Party	Dinesh Raya	1,714
UCPN (Maoist)	Ram Kishun Ray	1,601
Others		2,729
Result	TMSP gain	
Source: NepalNews

=== Election in the 2000s ===
==== 2008 Constituent Assembly election ====
Party	Candidate	Votes
Sadbhavana Party	Rajendra Mahato	17,073
Terai Madhesh Loktantrik Party	Ram Chandra Raya Yadav	8,752
Madheshi Janaadhikar Forum, Nepal	Rameshwar Raya	6,939
CPN (Unified Marxist–Leninist)	Raj Narayan Sah	4,615
Nepali Congress	Laxman Raya	4,207
Rastriya Janashakti Party	Ram Padartha Shah	3,177
Others		4,684
Invalid votes		2,918
Result	Sadbhavana gain	
Source: Election Commission

=== Election in the 1990s ===
==== 1999 legislative elections ====
Party	Candidate	Votes
Nepali Congress	Nagendra Kumar Raya	14,587
Nepal Sadbhawana Party	Rameshwar Raya	10,322
CPN (Unified Marxist–Leninist)	Som Bahadur Lama	9,181
Rastriya Prajatantra Party (Chand)	Khobhari Raya Yadav	8,903
CPN (Marxist–Leninist)	Vaidya Nath Mahato	4,526
Rastriya Prajatantra Party	Mukesh Prasad Sah Kalvar	3,987
Others		1,777
Invalid Votes		1,577
Result	RPP gain	
Source: Election Commission

==== 1994 legislative elections ====
Party	Candidate	Votes
Rastriya Prajatantra Party	Khobhari Raya Yadav	13,751
Nepali Congress	Nagendra Kumar Raya	12,361
Nepal Sadbhawana Party	Bishwa Nath Shaha	7,636
CPN (Unified Marxist–Leninist)	Kamala Devi Mahato	5,952
Samyukta Janamorcha Nepal	Vaidya Nath Mahato	5,283
Others		1,356
Result	RPP gain	
Source: Election Commission

==== 1991 legislative elections ====
Party	Candidate	Votes
CPN (Democratic)	Vaidya Nath Mahato	9,775
Rastriya Prajatantra Party (Chand)	Khobhari Raya Yadav	9,176
Result	CPN (D) gain	

== See also ==
- List of parliamentary constituencies of Nepal
- Sarlahi 1 (constituency)
- Sarlahi 2 (constituency)
- Sarlahi 3 (constituency)
