= Nepal Sadbhavana Party (Anandidevi) (2008) =

Nepal Sadbhavana Party (Anandidevi) नेपाल सद्भावना पार्टी (आनन्दीदेवी)
- Leader: Khushi Lal Mandal
- Founded: 2008

Nepal Sadbhavana Party (Anandidevi) is a political party in Nepal. The party is founded in 2008 and emerged from a split in the Nepal Sadbhavana Party (Anandidevi) as the grouping around Khushi Lal Mandal and Sarita Giri moved to expel the general secretary of the NSP(A) and Minister for Industry, Commerce and Supply Shyam Sundar Gupta from the party. Since Gupta was not sacked from the government cabinet, Singh vowed to pull NSP(A) out of the Seven Party Alliance. Effectively, there were two separate NSP(A)s in existence. The group that retained the registration at the Election Commission of Nepal is the group led by Gupta, and the Nepal Sadbhavana Party (Anandidevi) led by Mandal is currently unregistered.

After the Election Commission of Nepal had denied the Mandal-led NSP(A) to file a candidate list for the proportional system vote in the Constituent Assembly election (since Gupta's NSP(A) retained the party election symbol), the party decided not to field any candidates in the First-Past-the-Post seats either.

In 2015, the Nepal Sadbhawana Party (led by Sarita Giri) and the Sanghiya Sadbhawna Party (led by Anil Kumar Jha) merged to form a single party, the Nepal Sadbhawana Party (NSP). With this change, Anil Kumar Jha became chair of the integrated party (NSP), Sarita Giri became the vice chairperson, and Rajeev Jha became the general secretary.
