= Nepal Sadbhavana Party (Anandidevi) =

Nepal Sadbhavana Party (Anandidevi) नेपाल सद्भावना पार्टी (आनन्दीदेवी)
- President: Shyam Sundar Gupta
- Founded: 2003

Election symbol

Nepal Sadbhavana Party (Anandidevi) is a political party in Nepal. The party was formed in March 2003 by Anandidevi Singh in March 2003, after the Nepal Sadbhavana Party chairman Badri Prasad Mandal had joined the government installed by King Gyanendra. After the NSP(A) was founded, a Central Working Committee consisting of Durba Prasad Rajbanshi, Kushi Lal Mandal, Gauri Prasad Singh, Bhogendra Thakur, Madhav Prasad Yadav, Dev Narayan Yadav, Renu Yadav, Bishwonath Shah, Ramnarayan Raya, Kritram Pandit, Jaya Narayan Chaurasiya, Govinda Chaudhary, Govinda Tharu, Kasim Ali Siddique and Anil Kumar Jha was elected.

In June 2007, NSP merged into NSP(A). Anandidevi Singh retained the chairmanship of the unified party, whilst Laxman Lal Karna (NSP chairman) became vice chairman of NSP(A). However, just three months later the party suffered a major split, as Minister for Industry, Commerce and Supply Rajendra Mahato and Laxman Lal Karna formed their own 'NSP(A)' (later renamed 'Sadbhavana Party').

In February 2008, the party suffered another split, as the grouping around Singh move to expel the general secretary of the party and Minister for Industry, Commerce and Supply Shyam Sundar Gupta from the party. Since Gupta was sacked from the government cabinet, Khushi Lal Mandal vowed to pull NSP(A) out of the Seven Party Alliance. Effectively, there were two separate NSP(A)s in existence. The group that retained the registration at the Election Commission of Nepal is the group led by Gupta, and the group led by Khushi Lal Mandal is currently unregistered.

The party, under leadership of Gupta, launched 104 candidates in the First Past the Post constituencies in the 2008 Constituent Assembly election, but didn't win a single seat. The party did however win 2 seats through the Proportional Representation vote.

In August 2008, Singh was removed as chair of the party, and Gupta became Acting Chairman of the party instead.

In 2015 The Nepal Sadbhawana Party led by Sarita Giri and Anil Kumar Jha led Sanghiya Sadbhawna Party have merged to form a single party, Nepal Sadbhawana Party (NSP). Anil Kumar Jha will chair the integrated party (NSP) while Sarita Giri will be its vice chairperson and Rajeev Jha as a General Secretary.

== See also ==
- Nepal Dalit Utthan Manch
