= Narendra Sah Kalwar =

Nepalese politician

Honourable Narendra Sah Kalwar
- नरेन्द्र साह कलवार

Member of the House of Representatives
- Incumbent
- Assumed office 26 March 2026
- Preceded by: Hari Prasad Upreti
- Constituency: Sarlahi 3

Member of the Constituent Assembly
- In office 21 January 2014 – 14 October 2017
- Constituency: PR list

Personal details
- Born: 9 September 1972 (age 53) Barahathwa, Sarlahi District, Madhesh Province
- Citizenship: Nepalese
- Party: Rastriya Swatantra Party
- Other political affiliations: Terai Madhes Sadbhavana Party (2013-2017); CPN (Maoist Centre) (2022-2025)
- Spouse: Deepa Laxmi Sah
- Parents: Anant Sah Kalwar (father); Durga Devi Sah (mother)
- Occupation: Politician

Narendra Sah Kalwar (Nepali: नरेन्द्र साह कलवार; born 9 September 1972) is a Nepalese politician, businessman, former constituent assembly member and currently a member of Pratinidhi Sabha from Rastriya Swatantra Party.

His political journey started with the Terai Madhes Sadbhavana Party, which in turn helped him to enter the 2nd Nepalese Constituent Assembly as a PR candidate. Later, he contested in 2017 general election as an independent candidate and 2022 general election from CPN (Maoist Centre), but lost in both elections from the same constituency.

In 2026, he moved to Rastriya Swatantra Party and contested the 2026 general election from Sarlahi 2. In the 2026 general election, he won by securing 46,890 votes, defeating Narayan Kaji Shrestha, former deputy prime minister from Nepali Communist Party, and Hari Prasad Upreti, seating MP and former minister from CPN (Unified Marxist–Leninist).

== Early life and study ==
Mahato was born in Barahathwa, Sarlahi District on 9 September 1972.He has completed his high school degree.

== Electoral performance ==
Election	Year	Constituency	Contested for	Political party	Result	Votes	% of votes
Nepal general election	2017	Sarlahi 3	Pratinidhi Sabha member	Independent politician	Lost	12,086	18.97%
Nepal general election	2022	Sarlahi 3	Pratinidhi Sabha member	CPN (Maoist Centre)	Lost	32,168	41.67%
Nepal general election	2026	Sarlahi 3	Pratinidhi Sabha member	Rastriya Swatantra Party	Won	46,890	60.24%

=== 2026 general election ===
Candidate	Party	Votes	%
Narendra Sah Kalwar	Rastriya Swatantra Party	46,890	60.24
Narayan Kaji Shrestha	Nepali Communist Party	13,338	17.14
Binod Kumar Khanal	Nepali Congress	6,624	8.51
Hari Prasad Upreti	CPN (UML)	5,776	7.42
Tribhuwan Kumar Singh	Ujyaalo Nepal Party	2,622	3.37
Jay Prakash Raya	Janata Samajbadi Party, Nepal	766	0.98
Dholram Barkoti	Rastriya Prajatantra Party	478	0.61
Bir Bahadur Rumba	Mongol National Organisation	267	0.34
Sunil Prasad Gupta	Janamat Party	260	0.33
Krishna Nandan Raya	Independent	154	0.20
Shivadayal Mahara	Bahujan Samaj Party of Nepal	151	0.19
Sabiul Shesh	Pragatisheel Loktantrik Party	144	0.18
Others		368	0.47
Total		77,838	100.00
Valid votes		77,838	94.82
Invalid/blank votes		4,248	5.18
Total votes		82,086	100.00
Registered voters/turnout		134,412	61.07
Majority		33,552	
Rastriya Swatantra Party gain			
