= Rabin Mahato =

Nepalese politician

Honourable Rabin Mahato
- रबिन महतो

Member of the Pratinidhi Sabha
- Incumbent
- Assumed office 26 March 2026
- Preceded by: Mahindra Ray Yadav
- Constituency: Sarlahi 2

Personal details
- Born: 3 February 1988 (age 38) Salempur, Kabilasi Municipality – 10, Sarlahi, Madhesh Province
- Party: Rastriya Swatantra Party
- Parents: Ram Pukar Mahato Sudi (father); Lalita Sudi (mother)
- Occupation: Politician

Rabin Mahato (Note: Nepali: रबिन महतो; Maithili: 𑒩𑒥𑒱𑒢 𑒧𑒯𑒞𑒼 (Tirhuta), 𑂩𑂥𑂱𑂢 𑂧𑂯𑂞𑂷 (Kaithi), रबिन महतो (Devanagari)) (born 3 February 1988) is a Nepalese politician, and currently a member of Pratinidhi Sabha from Rastriya Swatantra Party. He joined active politics from the Rastriya Swatantra Party in 2026 and secured a party ticket to contest 2026 general election from Sarlahi 2.

In the 2026 general election, he won from Sarlahi 2 with 42,512 votes, defeating Mahindra Ray Yadav, seating MP and former minister from Nepali Communist Party, and Rajendra Mahato, former minister from Rastriya Mukti Party Nepal.

== Early life and study ==
Mahato was born in Kabilasi, Sarlahi District on 3 February 1988.He has completed his high school degree.

== Electoral performance ==
Election	Year	Constituency	Contested for	Political party	Result	Votes	% of votes	Ref.
Nepal general election	2026	Sarlahi 2	Pratinidhi Sabha member	Rastriya Swatantra Party	Won	42,512	58.73%	
