= Hajariya =

Hajariya हजरिया
- Village development committee
- Location in Nepal
- Coordinates: 27°0′0″N 85°24′30″E
- Country: Nepal
- Zone: Janakpur Zone
- District: Sarlahi District

Population (1991)
  - Total: 9,919
- Time zone: UTC+5:45 (Nepal Time)

Hajariya is a village development committee (VDC) in Sarlahi District in the Janakpur Zone of south-eastern Nepal. Now it is included to barahathwa municipality. At the time of the 2011 Nepal census it had a population of 16,336 people living in 2814 individual households.

Hajariya is bounded by Barahathwa on the east, Sundarpur Choharwa on the south, Rautahat district on the west and Rajghat on the north.

== Economy ==
This VDC produces maize, potato, sugarcane, tomato and seasonable vegetables.

== Education ==
Shree Saraswati Uchha Madhyamik Vidhyalaya is the higher secondary school of this VDC. It has been observed that most of the Students after higher secondary education migrate to city areas for education.

== History ==
People of this VDC were highly affected during UCPN Maoists' civil war. More than 50 persons were killed by both parties during the period of war.
