= Barahathwa Municipality =

Barahathwa बरहथवा
- Municipality (नगरपालिका)
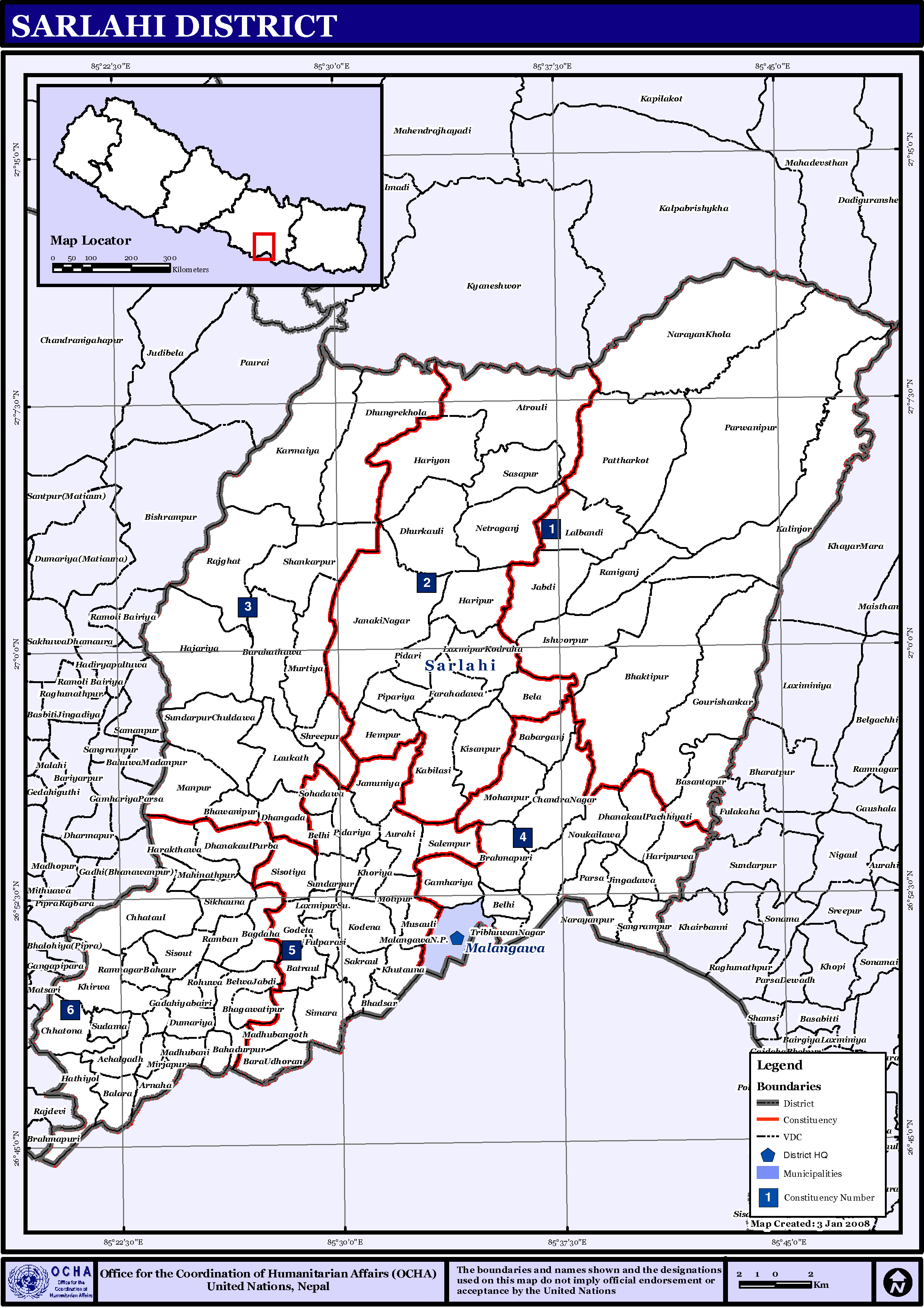

- Location in Nepal
- Coordinates: 27.00°N 85.24°E
- Country: Nepal
- Zone: Janakpur
- District: Sarlahi

Government
  - Mayor: Kalpana Kumari Katwal (CPN (UML)
  - Deputy Mayor: Rambabu Prasad Sah (CPN (UML)

Area
  - Total: 107.05 km^{2} (41.33 sq mi)

Population (2021)
  - Total: 81,120
  - Density: 757.8/km^{2} (1,963/sq mi)
- Time zone: UTC+5:45 (NST)
- Area code: 046
- Website: barhathwamun.gov.np

Barahathwa is a municipality of the Sarlahi District in the Janakpur Zone of central Nepal. The municipality was established on 19 September 2015 by merging the existing Barahathwa, Murtiya, Hajariya, Laukat, and Shreepur village development committee. In 2017, Sundarpur Choharwa and Janakinagar VDC was merged into this municipality. The center of the municipality is established in the former VDC Office of Barahathwa Bazaar. The municipality had a total population of 81,120 according to the 2021 Nepal census. The population is expected to reach 100,000 in this decade.

== Municipality ==
The Nepali government announced in 2015 the creation of 26 new municipalities. With this announcement, Barahathawa was upgraded to a municipality of Nepal; previously it was merely a proposed municipality. The adjoining villages, or VDCs, of Barahathawa, Shreepur, Murtiya, Hajariya, Janakinagar, Laukat and Sundarpur Choharwa were merged with Barahathawa to upgrade it to the status of a municipality.
