= Hari Prasad Upreti =

Nepali politician

- हरि प्रसाद उप्रेती

Minister of Defence
- In office 6 March 2024 – 4 July 2024
- President: Ram Chandra Poudel
- Prime Minister: Pushpa Kamal Dahal
- Preceded by: Purna Bahadur Khadka
- Succeeded by: Manbir Rai
- In office 17 January 2023 – 27 February 2023
- President: Bidya Devi Bhandari
- Prime Minister: Pushpa Kamal Dahal
- Preceded by: Pushpa Kamal Dahal as Prime Minister
- Succeeded by: Purna Bahadur Khadka

Member of the House of Representatives
- In office 26 December 2022 – 12 September 2025
- Preceded by: Rameshwar Raya Yadav
- Succeeded by: Narendra Sah Kalwar
- Constituency: Sarlahi 3

Personal details
- Born: 28 April 1967 (age 58) Sarlahi District
- Party: CPN (UML)

Hari Prasad Upreti is a Nepalese politician, belonging to the CPN (UML) currently serving as a member of the 2nd Federal Parliament of Nepal. In the 2022 Nepalese general election, he was elected from the Sarlahi 3 (constituency) He assumed the role of Defence Minister in the Coalition Government formed by Prime Minister Prachanda in January 2023.
