= Sarlahi 2 =

Parliamentary constituency in Sarlahi district, Nepal

- Parliamentary constituency
- Sarlahi 2 in Madhesh Province
- Province: Madhesh
- District: Sarlahi District
- Electorate: 125,311
- Major settlements: Malangawa; Ishwarpur

Current constituency
- Created: 1991
- Party: Rastriya Swatantra Party
- Member of Parliament: Rabin Mahato
- Local levels: Parsa Rural Municipality; Haripurwa Municipality; Brahmapuri Rural Municipality; Malangwa Municipality; Kaudena Rural Municipality; Kabilasi Municipality (wards 8–10); Bishnu Rural Municipality (wards 5–8); Ishwarpur Municipality (ward 15)

Sarlahi 2 is one of four parliamentary constituencies of Sarlahi District in Nepal. This constituency came into existence on the Constituency Delimitation Commission (CDC) report submitted on 31 August 2017.

== Incorporated areas ==
Sarlahi 2 incorporates Parsa Rural Municipality, Haripurwa Municipality, Bramhapuri Rural Municipality, Malangwa Municipality, Kaudena Rural Municipality, wards 8–10 of Kabilasi Municipality, wards 5–8 of Bishnu Rural Municipality and ward 15 of Ishwarpur Municipality.

== Assembly segments ==
It encompasses the following Madhesh Provincial Assembly segment

- Sarlahi 2(A)
- Sarlahi 2(B)

== Members of Parliament ==
=== Parliament/Constituent Assembly ===
Election	Member	Party
1991	Mina Pandey	Nepali Congress
1999	Rajendra Mahato	Nepal Sadbhawana Party
2008	Mohammad Rizwan Ansari	CPN (Unified Marxist–Leninist)
2013	Ram Chandra Chaudhary	Nepali Congress
2017	Mahindra Ray Yadav	Rastriya Janata Party Nepal
April 2020	Mahindra Ray Yadav	People's Socialist Party, Nepal
August 2022	Mahindra Ray Yadav	Nepal Socialist Party
2022	Mahindra Ray Yadav	CPN (Maoist Centre)
2026	Rabin Mahato	Rastriya Swatantra Party

=== Provincial Assembly ===
==== 2(A) ====
Election	Member	Party
2017	Gauri Narayan Sah Teli	Rastriya Janata Party Nepal
April 2020	Gauri Narayan Sah Teli	People's Socialist Party, Nepal
August 2021	Gauri Narayan Sah Teli	Loktantrik Samajwadi Party, Nepal

==== 2(B) ====
Election	Member	Party
2017	Ashok Kumar Yadav	Federal Socialist Forum, Nepal
May 2019	Ashok Kumar Yadav	Samajbadi Party, Nepal
April 2020	Ashok Kumar Yadav	People's Socialist Party, Nepal

== Election results ==
=== Election in the 2020s ===
==== 2026 general election ====
Candidate	Party	Votes	%
Rabin Mahato	Rastriya Swatantra Party	42,512	58.73
Mahindra Ray Yadav	Nepali Communist Party	8,523	11.78
Dr. Saroj Kumar	Nepali Congress	7,039	9.72
Rajendra Mahato	Rastriya Mukti Party Nepal	5,992	8.28
Raji Ahamad	Nepal Federal Socialist Party	2,283	3.15
Krishna Yadav	Nepal Ka Lagi Nepali Party	2,227	3.08
Nageshwor Sah	CPN (UML)	1,463	2.02
Bipin Kapar	Janamat Party	756	1.04
Bharat Chaudhary	Janata Samajbadi Party, Nepal	518	0.72
Manoj Kumar Ray	Independent	190	0.26
Raj Kishor Raya Yadav	Rastriya Prajatantra Party	143	0.20
Others		735	1.02
Total		72,381	100.00
Valid votes		72,381	93.05
Invalid/blank votes		5,408	6.95
Total votes		77,789	100.00
Registered voters/turnout		125,311	62.08
Majority		33,989	
Rastriya Swatantra Party gain			

==== 2022 general election ====
Candidate	Party	Votes	%
Mahindra Ray Yadav	CPN (Maoist Centre)	23,529	33.39
Rajendra Mahato	Loktantrik Samajwadi Party, Nepal	21,518	30.54
Raj Narayan Sah	CPN (UML)	14,819	21.03
Naresh Prasad Kushwaha	Janamat Party	6,554	9.30
Mustaqim Ansari	Nepal Federal Socialist Party	1,064	1.51
Others		2,985	4.24
Total		70,469	100.00
Majority		2,011	
CPN (Maoist Centre) gain			

=== Election in the 2010s ===
==== 2017 legislative elections ====
Party	Candidate	Votes
Rastriya Janata Party Nepal	Mahindra Ray Yadav	29,191
Nepali Congress	Jangi Lal Raya	18,976
CPN (Maoist Centre)	Dinesh Raya	8,037
Naya Shakti Party, Nepal	Pushpa Ranjitkar	1,449
Others		1,617
Invalid votes		4,399
Result	RJPN gain	
Source: Election Commission

==== 2017 Nepalese provincial elections ====
===== 2(A) =====
Party	Candidate	Votes
Rastriya Janata Party Nepal	Gauri Narayan Sah Teli	10,141
Nepali Congress	Binod Kumar Sah Teli	8,534
Naya Shakti Party, Nepal	Sanjay Kumar Rauniyar	4,006
CPN (Maoist Centre)	Raj Kumar Raya	3,722
Others		1,204
Invalid votes		2,045
Result	RJPN gain	
Source: Election Commission

===== 2(B) =====
Party	Candidate	Votes
Federal Socialist Forum, Nepal	Ashok Kumar Yadav	15,778
Nepali Congress	Nagendra Prasad Yadav	11,015
CPN (Maoist Centre)	Suresh Kumar Sah Teli	3,867
Others		1,776
Invalid votes		1,359
Result	FSFN gain	
Source: Election Commission

==== 2013 Constituent Assembly election ====
Party	Candidate	Votes
Nepali Congress	Ram Chandra Chaudhary	6,704
CPN (Unified Marxist–Leninist)	Surendra Kumar Lama	6,359
UCPN (Maoist)	Raj Kumar Raya Yadav	4,711
Terai Madhesh Loktantrik Party	Binay Kumar Karna	4,134
Sadbhavana Party	Ajzal Hussein	3,860
Madheshi Janaadhikar Forum, Nepal	Ram Naresh Raya Yadav	2,999
Federal Socialist Party, Nepal	Mohammad Rizwan Ansari	2,282
Rastriya Prajatantra Party	Kishore Bahadur Karki	1,802
Dalit Janajati Party	Kiran Kumar Paswan	1,786
Terai Madhesh Sadbhavna Party	Kailash Kishor Yadav	15,11
Chure Bhawar Rastriya Ekta Party Nepal	Badri Prasad Neupane	1,365
Others		3,866
Result	Congress gain	
Source: NepalNews

=== Election in the 2000s ===
==== 2008 Constituent Assembly election ====
Party	Candidate	Votes
CPN (Unified Marxist–Leninist)	Mohammad Rizwan Ansari	9,156
Chure Bhawar Rastriya Ekta Party Nepal	Ram Sharan Upreti	7,987
Terai Madhesh Loktantrik Party	Binay Kumar Karna	5,958
Nepali Congress	Satyadev Singh Danuwar	5,224
Sadbhavana Party	Surya Narayan Raya Yadav	5,173
Madheshi Janaadhikar Forum, Nepal	Ram Naresh Raya Yadav	3,732
Janamorcha Nepal	Pralhad Kumar Budhathoki	3,559
Dalit Janajati Party	Radheshyam Paswan	3,197
CPN (Maoist)	Ramprit Raya Yadav	2,759
Rastriya Prajatantra Party	Amar Bahadur Thapa	1,877
Rastriya Janashakti Party	Kishore Bahadur Karki	1,767
Others		3,123
Invalid votes		3,931
Result	CPN (UML) gain	
Source: Election Commission

=== Election in the 1990s ===
==== 1999 legislative elections ====
Party	Candidate	Votes
Nepal Sadbhawana Party	Rajendra Mahato	14,750
Rastriya Prajatantra Party	Surya Bahadur Thapa	13,369
Nepali Congress	Mina Pandey	8,918
CPN (Unified Marxist–Leninist)	Rajendra Roy Yadav	4,906
Rastriya Prajatantra Party (Chand)	Amar Bahadur Thapa	2,536
Samyukta Janamorcha Nepal	Bidur Prasad Kharel	1,516
Others		1,597
Invalid Votes		1,628
Result	NSP gain	
Source: Election Commission

==== 1994 legislative elections ====
Party	Candidate	Votes
Nepali Congress	Mina Pandey	10,795
Nepal Sadbhawana Party	Rajendra Mahato	10,173
Rastriya Prajatantra Party	Surya Bahadur Thapa	9,723
CPN (Unified Marxist–Leninist)	Laxman Paudel	7,724
Others		387
Result	Congress hold	
Source: Election Commission

==== 1991 legislative elections ====
Party	Candidate	Votes
Nepali Congress	Mina Pandey	10,684
Nepal Sadbhawana Party	Rajendra Mahato	7,828
Result	Congress gain	

== See also ==
- List of parliamentary constituencies of Nepal
- Sarlahi 1 (constituency)
- Sarlahi 3 (constituency)
- Sarlahi 4 (constituency)
