= Madhesh Rashtriya Jantantrik Party =

Madhesh Rashtriya Jantantrik Party (MRJP; Nepalष्ट्रिय जनतांत्रिक पार्टी) led by Rajeev Jha was an underground Terai group formed by uniting five distinct armed groups. In 2007 MRJP burned one person to death and injured five others when the group set a bus on fire in Saptari District. In 2008 MRJP opted for peace and started a dialog with the government.
