= Ashok Kumar Yadav (disambiguation) =

Ashok Kumar Yadav is an Indian politician.

Ashok Kumar Yadav may also refer to:

- Ashok Kumar Yadav (Sarlahi politician), a Nepalese politician from Kabilasi, Sarlahi
- Ashok Kumar Yadav (Siraha politician), a Nepalese politician from Sakhuwanankarkatti Rural Municipality
- Ashok Yadav, member of Bihar Legislative Council.
