= Birendra Prasad Singh =

Nepali politician and Minister of Madhesh Province

Honourable Birendra Prasad Singh
- बिरेन्द्र प्रसाद सिंह
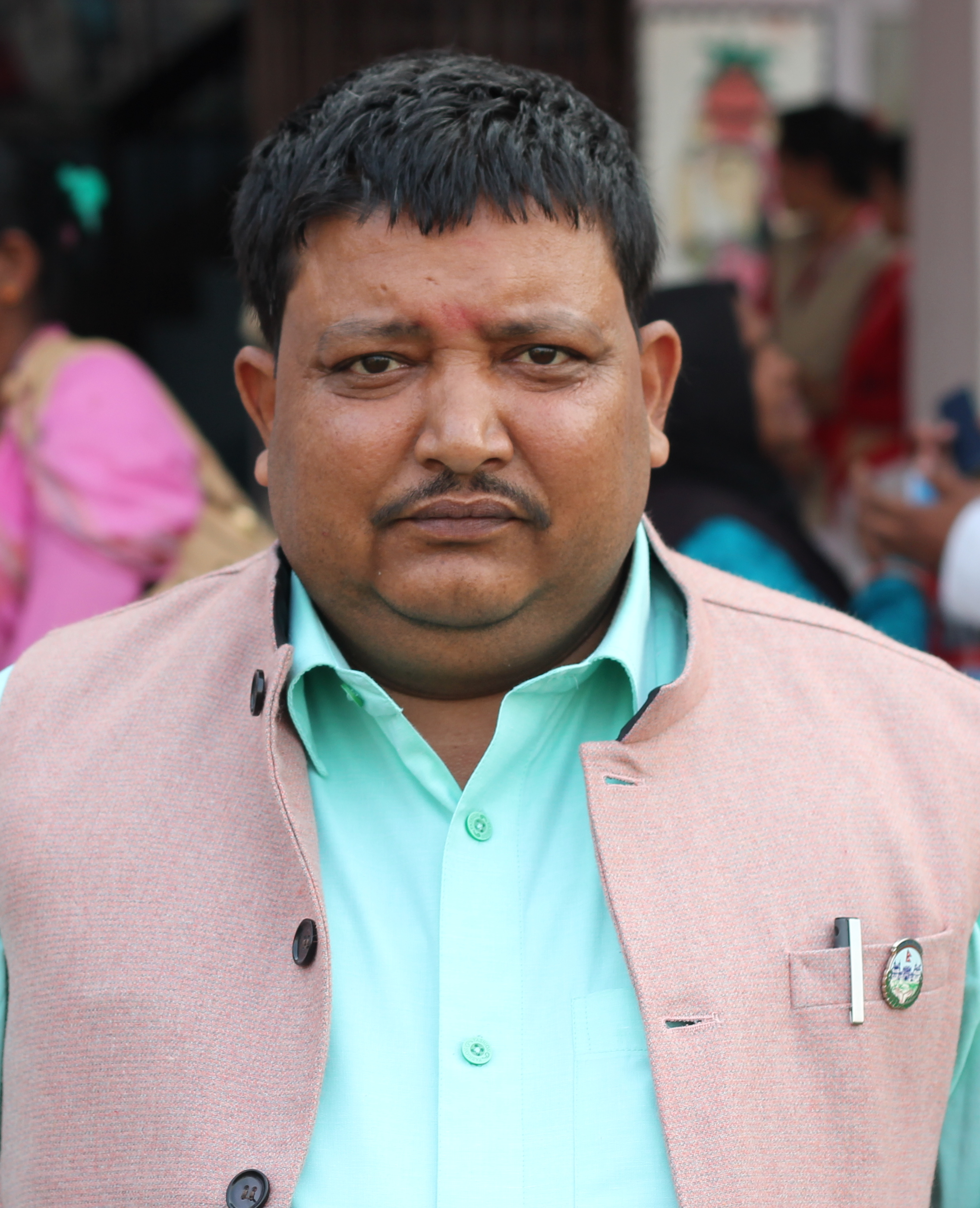

Minister for Health and Population of Madhesh Province
- Incumbent
- Assumed office 2023
- Governor: Hari Shankar Mishra

Minister for Women, Children, Youth and Sports of Madhesh Province
- In office 9 June 2021 – 2022
- Governor: Rajesh Jha; Hari Shankar Mishra
- Chief Minister: Lalbabu Raut
- Preceded by: Constitution Created

Province Assembly Member of Madhesh Province
- Incumbent
- Assumed office 2017
- Preceded by: Constituency Created
- Constituency: Sarlahi 4(A)

Personal details
- Born: 18 April 1978 (age 47) Dhankaul, Sarlahi, Nepal
- Party: Nepali Congress
- Website: p2.gov.np

Birendra Prasad Singh (Nepali: बिरेन्द्र प्रसाद सिंह) is a Nepalese politician who is Minister of Health and Population of Madhesh Province. Singh is also a member of Provincial Assembly of Madhesh Province and was elected to the 2017 provincial assembly elections from Sarlahi-4(A).

Previously, Singh has served as Minister for Youth, Women, Children and Sports of Madhesh Province, Nepal. He is a leader close to NC Vice-president Bimalendra Nidhi.

== Electoral history ==
Provincial Assembly election 2021

Sarlahi 4(A)
| Party | Candidate | Votes |
|---|---|---|
| Nepali Congress | Birendra Prasad Singh | 14,242 |
| CPN (Maoist Centre) | Fakira Mahato | 10,753 |
| Rastriya Janata Party Nepal | Rambabu Raya | 6,479 |
| Others | | 628 |
| Invalid votes | | 1,479 |
| Result | Congress gain | |

== See also ==
- Nepali Congress, Madhesh Province
- Bimalendra Nidhi
- Ram Saroj Yadav
- Amresh Kumar Singh
- Lalbabu Raut cabinet
