= Bela, Sarlahi =

Bela बेला
- Location in Nepal
- Coordinates: 26°58′30″N 85°36′30″E
- Country: Nepal
- Zone: Janakpur Zone
- District: Sarlahi District

Population (1991)
  - Total: 3,151
- Time zone: UTC+5:45 (Nepal Time)

Bela is a town in Ishworpur Municipality in Sarlahi District in the Janakpur Zone of south-eastern Nepal. At the time of the 1991 Nepal census it had a population of 3,151 people living in 557 individual households.
