= Kaushal Kishor Ray =

Nepalese politician

Honourable Kaushal Kishor Ray
- कौशल किशोर राय

Minister for Labor and Transport of Madhesh Province
- Incumbent
- Assumed office 18 July 2024
- Chief Minister: Satish Kumar Singh

Provincial Assembly Member of Madhesh Province
- Incumbent
- Assumed office 2022
- Preceded by: Ashok Kumar Yadav
- Constituency: Sarlahi 2(B)

Personal details
- Party: Nepali Congress
- Occupation: Politician

Kaushal Kishor Ray (Nepali: कौशल किशोर राय) is a Nepalese politician belonging to Nepali Congress and the current Minister for Labour and Transport of Madhesh Province.

Ray is a member of Provincial Assembly of Madhesh Province. He was elected via 2022 Nepalese provincial elections from Sarlahi 2(B).

== Electoral history ==
=== 2022 Madhesh Provincial Assembly election ===
Sarlahi 2(B)
Party	Candidate	Votes
Nepali Congress	Kaushal Kishor Ray	9,626
Loktantrik Samajwadi	Mayur Chaudhary	9,447
People's Socialist Party Nepal	Ashok Kumar Yadav	8,940
Result	Congress gain	
Source: Election Commission
