= Madheshi Jana Adhikar Forum, Nepal (Loktantrik) =

Madheshi Jana Adhikar Forum, Nepal (Loktantrik) मधेसी जनअधिकार फोरम, नेपाल (लोकतांत्रिक)
- Abbreviation: MJF (L)/MJFN (L)
- President: Bijay Kumar Gachhadar
- General secretary: Mrigendra Kumar Singh Yadav; Jitendra Narayan Dev
- Deputy chairman: Rameshwar Raya Yadav
- Senior leader: Sharat Singh Bhandari
- Founded: 29 July 2009
- Dissolved: 5 April 2017
- Split from: MJF
- Succeeded by: Nepal Loktantrik Forum
- Headquarters: Kathmandu, Nepal
- Youth wing: Madhesi Youth Forum (Loktantrik)
- Ideology: Social democracy
- Political position: Centre-left

Election symbol
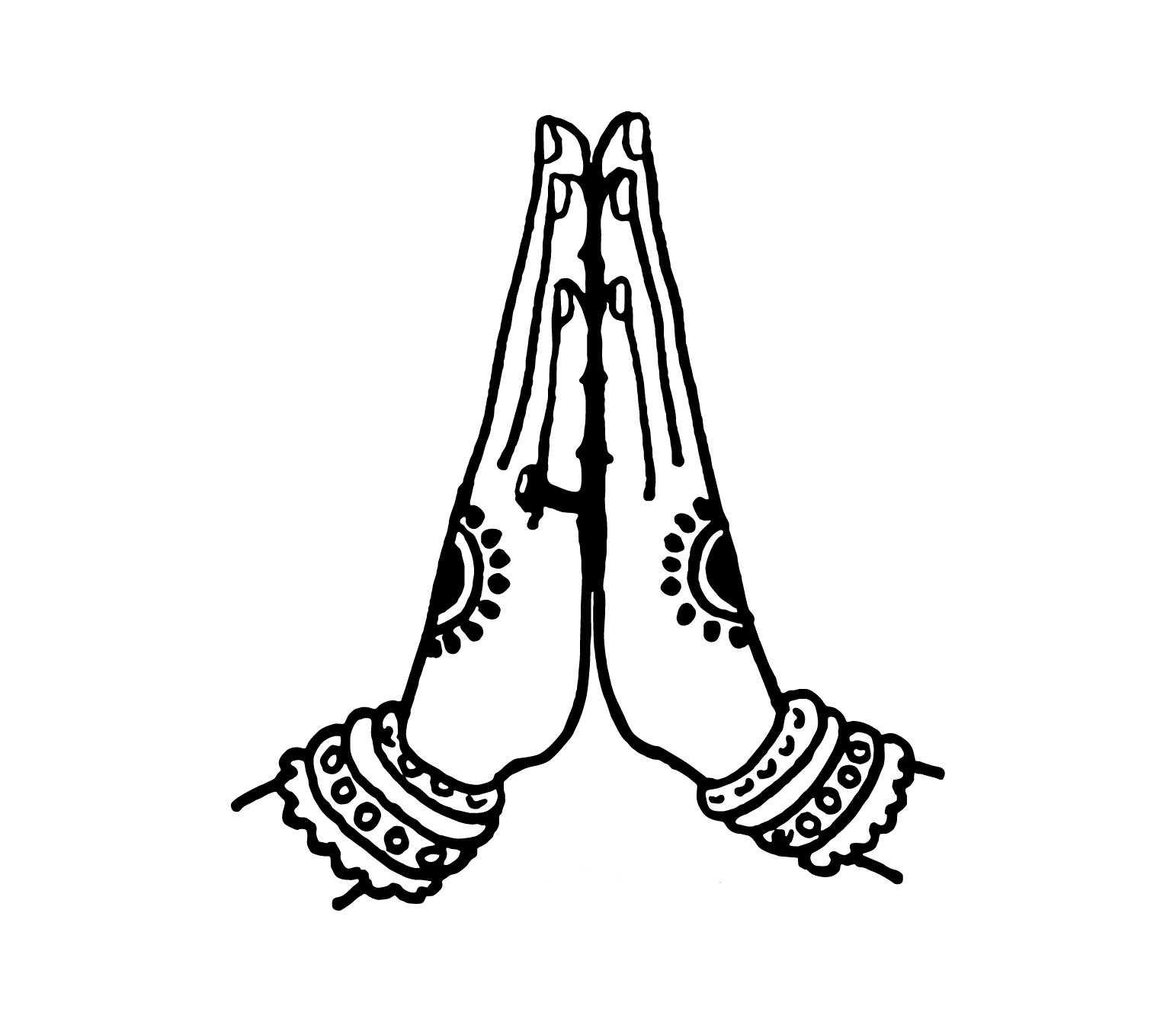

Party flag
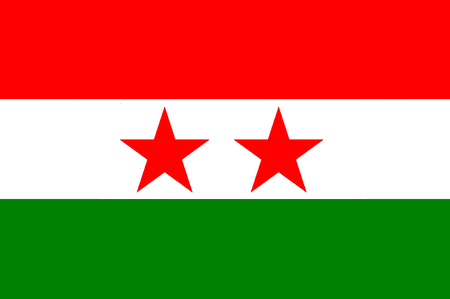

The Madhesi Jana Adhikar Forum, Nepal (Loktantrik) was a political party in Nepal. It existed as one of the important political force during the constituent assembly. Later the party merged with several other parties to become the largest Madhesh/Tharuhath based party, Nepal Loktantrik Forum.

== History ==
=== Formation ===
The party was formed after Upendra Yadav expelled Bijay Kumar Gachhadar and six other members after his agreement to join the new CPN (UML)-led government. As a result, the former party was split with 26 among 52 members of constituent assembly opposing Yadav's decision. The MJFN (L) included former leaders of other political parties like the Nepali Congress and Nepal Sadbhawana Party who were from democratic background.

The party was registered with the Election Commission of Nepal shortly after the 2008 Constituent Assembly election due to mass ideological differences in mother party with majority of democratic background while few being leftist.

=== First constituent assembly ===
The party had 26 members in the first constituent assembly. All of them were the one who sided with Gachhadar opposing the authoritarian character of Upendra Yadav.

=== Second constituent assembly ===
The party fought the second constituent assembly on its own and won 14 seats. The party won 4 seats from FPTP system while won 10 seats from proportional representation. As a result, the party stood as the largest Terai Madhesh based party in the assembly.

The party merged on April 5, 2017 with the Rastriya Janamukti Party (Loktantrik) and Dalit Janajati Party to form Nepal Loktantrik Forum.

== Leadership ==
=== Chairman ===
- Bijay Kumar Gachhadar

=== Deputy chairman ===
- Rameshwar Raya Yadav

=== General secretary ===
- Mrigendra Kumar Singh Yadav
- Jitendra Narayan Dev

== Election results ==
Election	Leader	FPTP		Proportional		Seats	Position	Status
Election	Leader	Votes	%	Votes	%	Seats	Position	Status
2013	Bijay Kumar Gachhadar	283,468	3.13	274,987	2.91	14 / 575	5th	Opposition

== See also ==
- Madhes Movement
- Bijay Kumar Gachhadar
