= Rameshwar Raya Yadav =

Nepali politician

Rameshwor Ray Yadav
- रामेश्वर राय यादव

Minister of Labour, Employment and Social Security
- In office 20 November 2019 – 25 December 2020
- President: Bidhya Devi Bhandari
- Prime Minister: KP Sharma Oli
- Preceded by: Gokarna Bista
- Succeeded by: Gauri Shankar Chaudhary

Member of Parliament, Pratinidhi Sabha
- Incumbent
- Assumed office 4 March 2018
- Preceded by: Hari Prasad Upreti
- Constituency: Sarlahi 3

Member of Parliament, Rastriya Sabha
- In office 26 June 1991 – 27 June 1997

Personal details
- Born: 20 July 1955 (age 71)
- Party: CPN (Maoist Centre) (2017–present)
- Other political affiliations: Nepal Sadbhawana Party (1984–2007); MJF-N (2007–2017)

Rameshwor Raya Yadav (Nepali: रामेश्वर राय यादव) is a Nepalese politician, and former Minister of Labour, Employment and Social Security.

== Political History ==
Rameshwor Raya Yadav started his political career with the Nepal Sadbhavana Party. Following the Madhesh Movement, he has joined the Madhesi Jana Adhikar Forum, Nepal. After Bijay Kumar Gachhadar split from the party, Yadav also left along with him. Subsequently, the Madhesi Jana Adhikar Forum (Democratic) was formed under Gachhadar’s leadership. After the party later merged into the Nepali Congress, Yadav joined the then CPN (Maoist Centre), now the Communist Party of Nepal. In the 2017AD general election, he has been elected from Sarlahi Constituency No. 3 and served as Minister for Labour, Employment and Social Security.
