= Bhaktipur =

Bhaktipur भक्तिपुर BHAKTIKHOR
- Village development committee
- Nickname: BHAKTIPUR
- Location in Nepal
- Coordinates: 26°58′0″N 85°40′0″E
- Country: Nepal
- Zone: Janakpur Zone
- District: Sarlahi District

Population (1991)
  - Total: 12,183
- Time zone: UTC+5:45 (Nepal Time)
- Postal code: 046

Bhaktipur is a town in Ishwarpur Municipality in Sarlahi District in the Janakpur Zone of south-eastern Nepal. At the time of the 1991 Nepal census it had a population of 12,183 people living in 2,261 individual households.
