= Vijay Krishna (politician) =

Indian politician

MP
- Constituency: Barh

Personal details
- Born: 2 September 1951 (age 74) Gaya, Bihar
- Party: RJD
- As of 26 September, 2006

Vijay Krishna (born 2 September 1951) is a member of the 14th Lok Sabha of India. He represents the Barh constituency of Bihar and is a member of the Rashtriya Janata Dal (RJD) political party.
