= Babarganj =

Babarganj बबरगञ्ज
- Village development committee
- Location in Nepal
- Coordinates: 26°57′0″N 85°36′30″E
- Country: Nepal
- Zone: Janakpur Zone
- District: Sarlahi District

Population (1991)
  - Total: 7,405
- Time zone: UTC+5:45 (Nepal Time)

Babarganj is a village development committee in Sarlahi District in the Janakpur Zone of south-eastern Nepal. At the time of the 1991 Nepal census it had a population of 7,405 people living in 1,353 individual households. This village is the birthplace of political leader Rajendra Mahato, Dr. BinayThakur, Dr.Raju Ray and Mukesh Thakur.
