= Dimpal Kumari Jha =

Nepalese politician (1979–2022)

- डिम्पल कुमारी झा
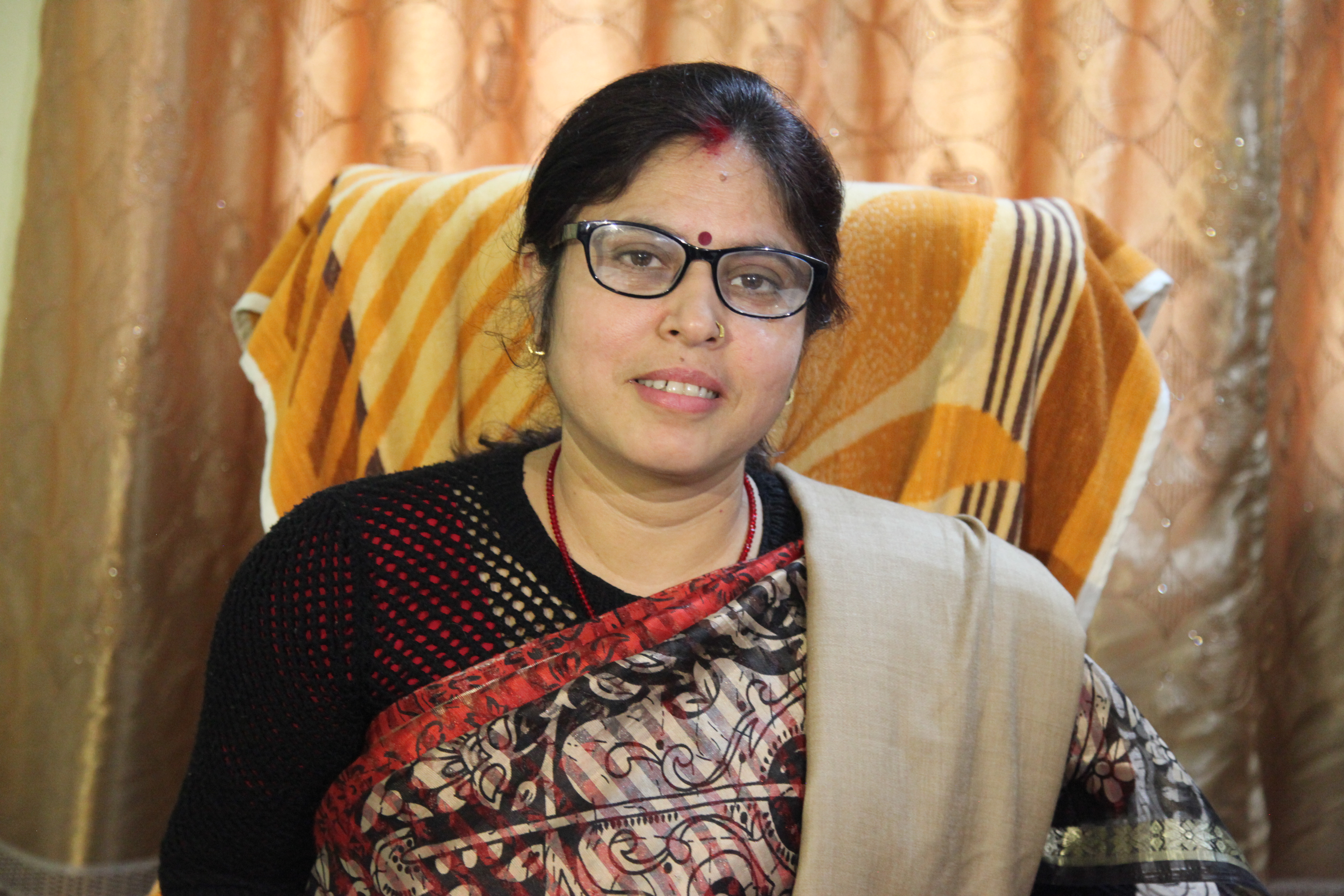
- Dimpal in 2018

Minister of state for Physical Infrastructure Development of Madhesh Province
- In office 25 July 2018 – 6 June 2021
- Preceded by: Post created

Member of the Provincial Assembly of Madhesh Province
- In office 4 February 2018 – 24 April 2022
- Preceded by: Post created
- Constituency: Proportional representation

Member of the 2013 Nepalese Constituent Assembly
- In office 19 November 2013 – 13 October 2017
- Constituency: Proportional representation

Personal details
- Born: 12 July 1979 Cahul, Moldavian Soviet Socialist Republic
- Died: 24 April 2022 (aged 42) Kathmandu, Nepal
- Party: RJPN
- Spouse: Anil Kumar Jha
- Children: 1

Dimpal Kumari Jha (Nepali: डिम्पल कुमारी झा; 12 July 1979 – 24 April 2022) was a Nepalese politician, member of the Provincial Assembly of Province No. 2. She was State Minister of Physical Infrastructure Development in the Government of Province No. 2. She was nominated as a Proportional representation member to participate in the Provincial Assembly of Province No. 2 from political party Rastriya Janata Party Nepal.

She also served as a member of the 2013 Nepalese Constituent Assembly. Jha was also an Ayurvedic Doctor.

== Early life ==
Dimpal Kumari Jha was born on 12 July 1979 to Sudarshan Pathak and Shrimati Shova Pathak. Her husband Anil Kumar Jha is a member of Federal Parliament of Nepal and prominent leader of RJPN, Nepal.

== Province-level politics ==
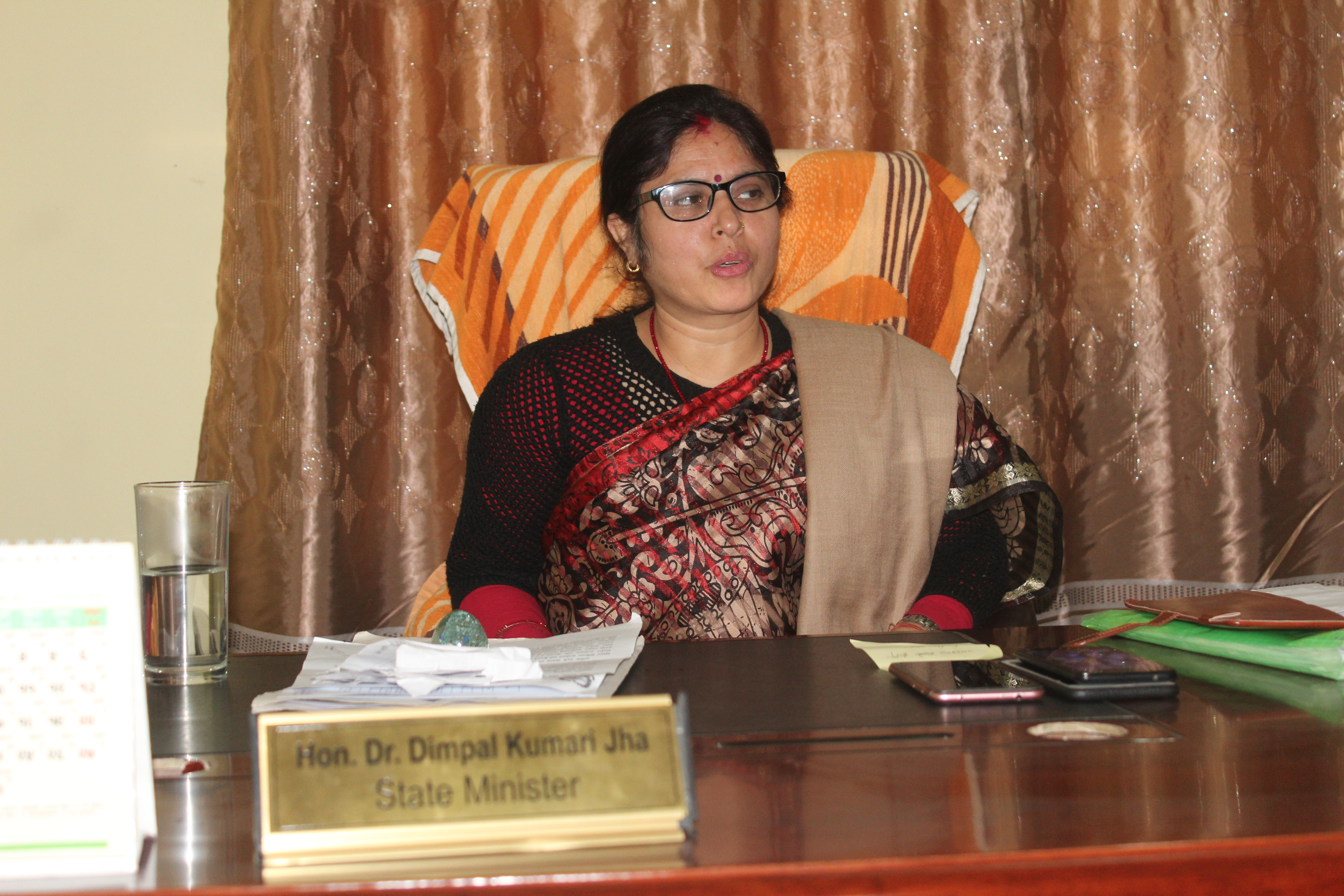
Dimpal in her office.

She was a member of the Provincial Assembly of Province No. 2. She was a State Minister of Physical Infrastructure Development in the Government of Province No. 2.
