= Gauri Narayan Sah Teli =

Nepalese politician (born 1945)

- गौरी नारायण साह तेली
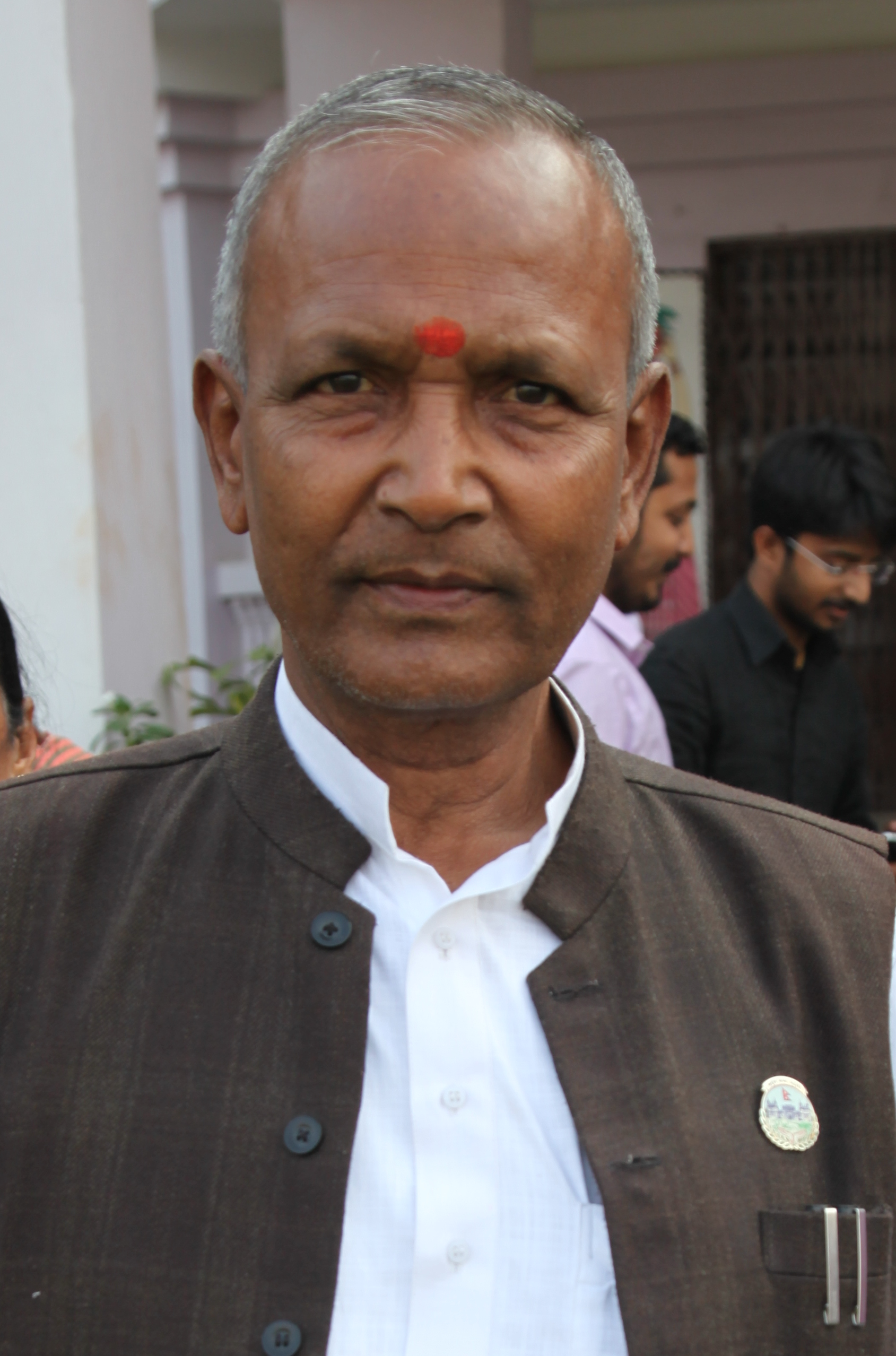
- Portrait of Teli in 2019

Province Assembly Member of Madhesh Province
- In office 2017–2022
- Preceded by: N/A
- Succeeded by: Jangilal Ray
- Constituency: Sarlahi 2 (A)

Personal details
- Party: Loktantrik Samajbadi Party, Nepal
- Occupation: Politician

Gauri Narayan Sah Teli (Nepali: गौरी नारायण साह तेली) (born 1945) is a Nepalese politician who is the elected member of the Provincial Assembly of Madhesh Province from Loktantrik Samajbadi Party, Nepal. Sah, a resident of Brahmapuri, Sarlahi was elected to the 2017 provincial assembly election from Sarlahi 2(A).

== Electoral history ==
=== 2017 Nepalese provincial elections ===
Party	Candidate	Votes
Rastriya Janata Party Nepal	Gauri Narayan Sah Teli	10,141
Nepali Congress	Binod Kumar Sah Teli	8,534
Naya Shakti Party, Nepal	Sanjay Kumar Rauniyar	4,006
CPN (Maoist Centre)	Raj Kumar Raya	3,722
Others		1,204
Invalid votes		2,045
Result	RJPN gain	
Source: Election Commission
