= Sanjay Kumar Yadav =

Nepalese politician

Honourable Sanjay Kumar Yadav
- संजय कुमार यादव

Province Assembly Member of Madhesh Province
- Incumbent
- Assumed office 2017
- Preceded by: N/A
- Constituency: Sarlahi 3 (constituency)

Personal details
- Born: January 24, 1986 (age 40)
- Party: People's Socialist Party, Nepal
- Occupation: Politician

Sanjay Kumar Yadav (Nepali: संजय कुमार यादव) is a Nepalese politician and a member of Provincial Assembly of Madhesh Province belonging to People's Socialist Party, Nepal. Yadav, a resident of Kabilasi, Sarlahi, was elected via 2017 Nepalese provincial elections from Sarlahi 3(B) constituency. Back in 2017, he was a party candidate from the Federal Socialist Forum, Nepal for provincial assembly election.

== Personal life ==
Yadav was born on 24 January 1986 to father Nawal Kishor Yadav and mother Rajkali Devi.

== Electoral history ==
=== 2017 Nepalese provincial elections ===
Party	Candidate	Votes
Federal Socialist Forum, Nepal	Sanjay Kumar Yadav	11,368
Nepali Congress	Krishna Dev Yadav	9,297
CPN (Maoist Centre)	Ram Babu Prasad Singh	5,979
Independent	Nawal Kishor Raya Yadav	1,991
Others		1,498
Invalid votes		1,298
Result	FSFN gain	
Source: Election Commission
