= Mina Pandey =

Nepali politician (1952–2023)

Meena Pandey
- मीना पाण्डे

Member of the House of Representatives
- In office 4 March 2018 – 18 September 2022
- PR group: Khas Arya (Women)
- Constituency: Nepali Congress PR list

Member of the Constituent Assembly of Nepal
- In office 28 May 2008 – 28 May 2012
- PR group: Khas Arya (Women)
- Constituency: Nepali Congress PR list

Minister of State for Women and Social Welfare
- In office April 21, 1998 – December 23, 1998
- Monarch: King Birendra
- Prime Minister: Girija Prasad Koirala
- Preceded by: herself
- Succeeded by: Kamala Panta
- In office December 3, 1997 – April 12, 1998
- Monarch: King Birendra
- Prime Minister: Surya Bahadur Thapa
- Succeeded by: herself

Member of Parliament, Pratinidhi Sabha
- In office May 31, 1994 – May 31, 1999
- Prime Minister: Man Mohan Adhikari, Sher Bahadur Deuba, Lokendra Bahadur Chand Surya Bahadur Thapa, Girija Prasad Koirala
- Preceded by: herself
- Succeeded by: Rajendra Mahato
- Constituency: Sarlahi 2
- In office 20 June 1991 – 11 July 1994
- Prime Minister: Girija Prasad Koirala
- Preceded by: Constituency established
- Succeeded by: herself
- Constituency: Sarlahi 2

President of the Nepal Woman Association
- In office October 5, 2001 – May 12, 2007
- President: Girija Prasad Koirala
- Preceded by: Kantika Singh
- Succeeded by: Ambika Basnet

Personal details
- Born: 11 May 1952 Bethan-2, Ramechhap, Nepal
- Died: 30 May 2023 (aged 71) Gaushala, Kathmandu
- Citizenship: Nepali
- Party: Nepali Congress
- Spouse: Yagna Bahadur Pandey (m. 1980)
- Parents: Bhakta Bahadur Khadka (father); Dev Kumari Khadka (mother)
- Education: Padma Kanya Campus, TU (Bachelor of Arts in Sociology and History)

Mina Pandey (Nepali: मीना पाण्डे) (11 May 1952 – 30 May 2023) was a Nepali politician, a member of the House of Representatives of the Federal Parliament of Nepal, and a former Minister of State for Women and Social Welfare, serving from December 1997 to December 1998.

== Early life and education ==
Pandey was born on 11 May 1952 in Bethan-2, Ramechhap District, the third child of Bhakta Bahadur Khadka and Dev Kumari Khadka. She attended Shree Kusheshwor Primary School, studying up to class five before leaving due to the absence of secondary schools in the village.

In 1968, she moved to Kathmandu and resumed her studies, enrolling in class nine. She later completed an undergraduate degree in Sociology and History from Padma Kanya Campus (PKC), a constituent campus of Tribhuvan University.

== Political career ==
=== Student activism ===
Pandey began her political involvement during her student years. In 1978-79, she became the first elected President of PKC's Free Students Union. She also served as a Central Committee Member of the Nepal Student Union (NSU), affiliated with the Nepali Congress. She participated in the Satyagraha movements of 1982 and 1985, and was jailed for the first time during the Students' Movement of 1990.

=== Parliamentary career ===
Pandey was a member of the Nepali Congress and had a long parliamentary career. She was first elected to Nepal's House of Representatives from the Sarlahi 2 constituency in the 1991 general election. She was re-elected from the same constituency in the 1994 general election, defeating Rajendra Mahato of the Nepal Sadbhavana Party by a margin of 387 votes.

During her parliamentary tenure, she played a role in amending the eleventh Fundamental Rights provision and in the passage of the Abortion Bill, which was approved in 2000.

Pandey served as Minister of State for Women and Social Welfare in the cabinets headed by Surya Bahadur Thapa and later by Girija Prasad Koirala from December 1997 to December 1998.

During the second People's Movement in 2006, she was arrested on more than a dozen occasions.

=== Constituent Assembly ===
She served as a member of the 1st Nepalese Constituent Assembly from 2008 to 2012, representing the Nepali Congress under the proportional representation system. During her tenure, she chaired the Civic Relations Committee, which was responsible for collecting public opinion during the constitution drafting process. She was also a member of the State Affairs and Good Governance Committee of the Assembly.

In the 2013 Constituent Assembly election, she was a candidate for Nepali Congress in the Sarlahi-2 constituency.

=== Women's organizations ===
Pandey was elected president of the Nepal Women's Association at its first general convention, held in Biratnagar from 3–5 October 2001, leading a 27-member executive committee. She was a vocal advocate for proportional and inclusive representation of women in political processes, and for equal rights regarding citizenship.

== Personal life ==
In 1980, Pandey married Yagna Bahadur Pandey from Karmaiya VDC-5, Sarlahi.

== Death ==
Pandey died on 30 May 2023, at the age of 71.
