= Gajendra Narayan Singh (politician) =

Nepali politician

- गजेन्द्रनारायण सिंह
- Born: 1929; Koiladi (now Tilathi Koiladi), Saptari, Nepal
- Died: January 23, 2002
- Education: Intermediate of Arts
- Alma mater: Varansi, India
- Political party: Nepal Sadbhawana Party
- Movement: Madhesh movements
- Spouse: Aanandi Devi Singh
- Children: Yashwant Kumar Singh
- Parent(s): K. C. Singh (Father); Radha Devi (Mother)
- Awards: National Martyr

Gajendra Narayan Singh was a Nepali politician and a Madhesi activist. He founded the Nepal Sadbhawana Party (NSP) in 1985. He took the Madhesi cause to National and International Level to raise awareness about the discrimination. Gajendra Narayan Singh, president of the Nepal Sadhbahavana Party, died on January 23, 2002. His body was taken to Saptari Sewa Ashram at Koiladi in Saptari District in Nepal and cremated with full state honours on January 25.

== History ==
Singh led a very simple and austere life and spent most of his time in the Ashram he created in 1991. In July 2001, he created the "Gajendra Narayan Public Welfare trust" and donated all his property and belongings to the trust. The trust was to look after the poor, helpless and the backward communities in the southern districts of Nepal. Singh entered politics in 1947 and joined the Nepali National Congress, (presently the Nepali Congress) but left the party in 1980s to form a cultural forum known as Nepal Sadbhavana Parishad, which was turned later into a political party, the Nepal Sadhbhavana Party (NSP). Singh went into exile to Darbhanga in 1960, when King Mahendra seized control of the country after putting into prison the leaders of the ruling Nepali Congress in the brief period when Nepal experienced multi-party democracy between 1959 and 1960. Unable to visit his home, he lived a life in penury until he returned to Nepal in 1977. Singh continued to champion the cause of Terains throughout his political career.

He left the Nepali Congress only when he felt that B.P. Koirala and his party continued to discriminate against the Terains. He continued to wear the traditional Dhoti and Kurta in the parliament while the official dress was the "Daura Suruwal". Despite opposition from the Pahadi parliamentarians, Singh was not ashamed to speak in Hindi in parliamentary debates. Singh’s pet objective was to get full citizenship rights to a majority of Terains who were born and brought up in Terai. From the configuration of electoral districts, regions to recruitment in the army and Police, the Terains were and continue to be discriminated against in every field.

G.N. Singh despite being abused by the media, other political leaders and the bureaucracy continued to fight for the Terain cause. Singh on his return from exile believed that the interests of the Terains would best be served by working within the Panchayat system and accordingly stood for elections in 1980 in Saptari district. When the counting was going in favour of G.N. Singh, the workers in the counting hall chased away Singh’s supporters and the results were declared in favour of another candidate. Undaunted, he continued to stand for elections and won in all but one. Soon after the bomb blasts by the Janawadi Morcha of Ram Raja Prasad Singh near the Palace in the eighties, G.N.Singh was arrested and kept in chains for many months.

In spite of his incarceration G.N. Singh held no grudge against Late King Birendra or the monarchy itself. It was his view that the monarchy was the unifying factor and it was only the King who could help the Terain cause. In the initial stages G.N.Singh had many youngsters who flocked round him and worked genuinely for the cause. They were never given due encouragement and G.N.Singh like a banyan tree held everyone together but never allowed any leader to come up to take his place. In spite of his incarceration G.N. Singh held no grudge against Late King Birendra or the monarchy itself. It was his view that the monarchy was the unifying factor and it was only the King who could help the Terain cause. In the initial stages G.N.Singh had many youngsters who flocked round him and worked genuinely for the cause. They were never given due encouragement and G.N.Singh like a banyan tree held everyone together but never allowed any leader to come up to take his place.

== Legacy ==
- Gajendra Narayan Singh Sagarmatha Zonal Hospital
- Gajendra Narayan Singh Industrial Estate
- Gajendra Chauk
  Gajendra Chauk in the center of the city Rajbiraj named after renowned madheshi democratic revolutionary leader Gajendra Narayan Singh which was previously named by King Tribhuvan. Sometimes also referred as the 'Gol Chauk'.

== See also ==
- Hridayesh Tripathi
