= Dilli Prasad Upreti =

Nepalese politician

Honourable Dilli Prasad Upreti
- डिल्ली प्रसाद उप्रेती

Province Assembly Member of Madhesh Province
- Incumbent
- Assumed office 2017
- Preceded by: N/A
- Constituency: Sarlahi 3 (constituency)

Personal details
- Born: September 28, 1959 (age 66)
- Party: CPN (Unified Socialist)
- Occupation: Politician

Dilli Prasad Upreti (Nepali: डिल्ली प्रसाद उप्रेती) is a Nepalese politician. He is a member of Provincial Assembly of Madhesh Province from CPN (Unified Socialist). Upreti, a resident of Hariwan, was elected via 2017 Nepalese provincial elections from Sarlahi 3(A).

== Electoral history ==
=== 2017 Nepalese provincial elections ===
Party	Candidate	Votes
CPN (Unified Marxist-Leninist)	Dilli Prasad Upreti	20,246
Nepali Congress	Kapil Muni Mailali	7,050
Rastriya Janata Party Nepal	Kusum Kumar Mahato	5,958
Others		1,323
Invalid votes		1,508
Result	CPN (UML) gain	
Source: Election Commission
