= Ashok Kumar Yadav (Sarlahi politician) =

Nepalese politician

- अशोक कुमार यादव
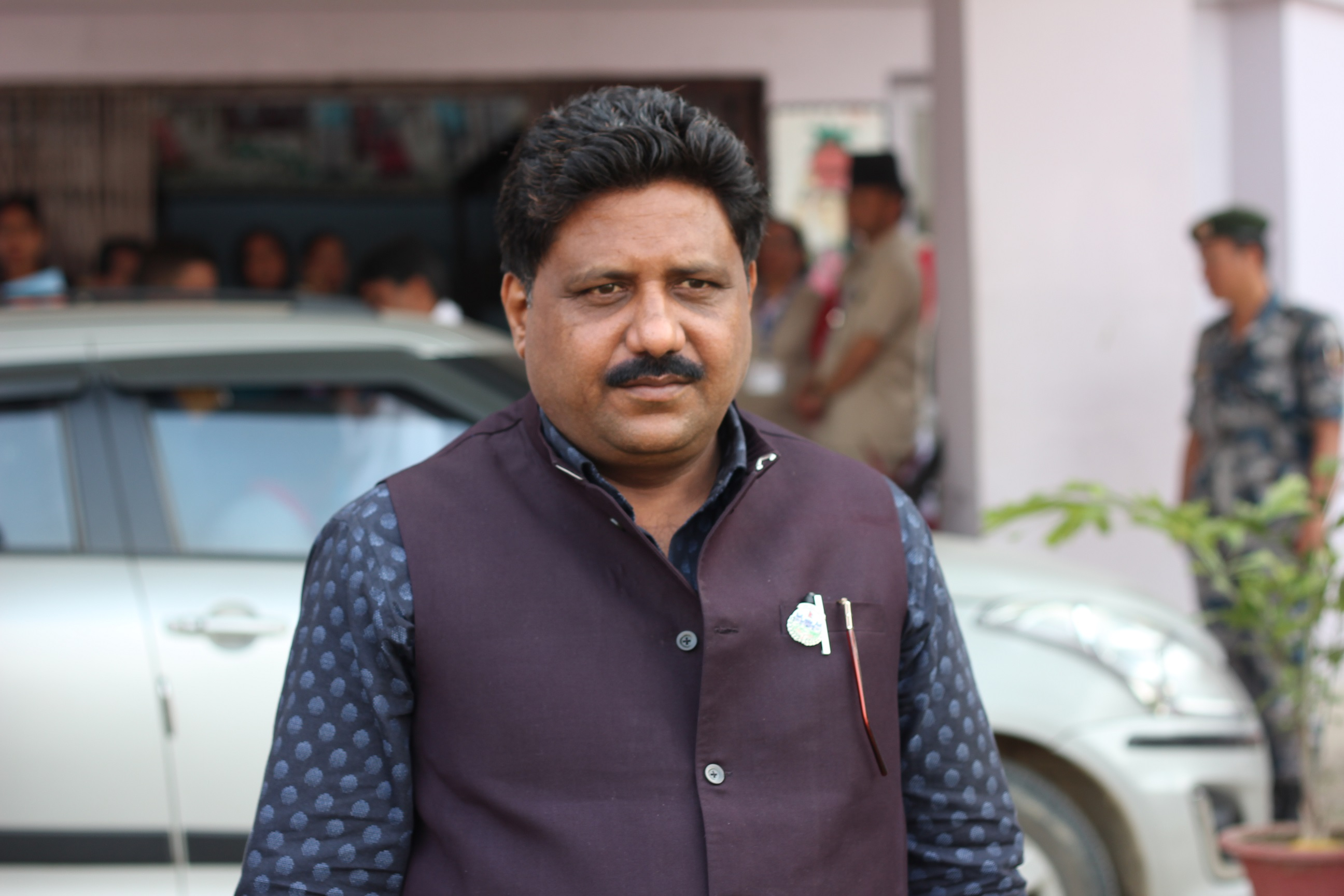
- Portrait of Yadav in 2019

Province Assembly Member of Madhesh Province
- In office 2017–2022
- Preceded by: N/A
- Succeeded by: Kaushal Kishor Ray
- Constituency: Sarlahi 2 (constituency)

Personal details
- Born: August 12, 1977 (age 48)
- Party: People's Socialist Party
- Occupation: Politician

Ashok Kumar Yadav (Nepali: अशोक कुमार यादव) is a Nepalese politician and chairman of People's Socialist Party for Madhesh Pradesh committee. He is a former member of Provincial Assembly of Madhesh Province from People's Socialist Party, Nepal. Yadav, a resident of Kabilasi, Sarlahi, was elected via 2017 Nepalese provincial elections from Sarlahi 2(B).

== Electoral history ==
=== 2017 Nepalese provincial elections ===
| Party | Candidate | Votes |
|---|---|---|
| Federal Socialist Forum, Nepal | Ashok Kumar Yadav | 15,778 |
| Nepali Congress | Nagendra Prasad Yadav | 11,015 |
| CPN (Maoist Centre) | Suresh Kumar Sah Teli | 3,867 |
| Others | | 1,776 |
| Invalid votes | | 1,359 |
| Result | FSFN gain | |
Source: Election Commission

== See also ==
- People's Socialist Party
