= Nepal Dalit Utthan Manch =

Nepal Dalit Utthan Manch (Nepali: नेपाल दलित उत्थान मञ्च) is a Nepalese Dalit movement linked to the Nepal Sadbhavana Party (Anandidevi). Sebal Ram serves as the president of the organisation.
