= Barh Lok Sabha constituency =

Former constituency of the Lok Sabha in Bihar, India

Coordinates: 25.5°N 85.7°E

Barh
- Former Lok Sabha constituency

Constituency details
- Country: India
- Region: East India
- State: Bihar
- Established: 1957
- Abolished: 2008

Barh Lok Sabha constituency was a Lok Sabha constituency in Bihar from 1957 to 2008. This constituency was created in 1957 when Patna East Lok Sabha was renamed as Barh Lok Sabha.

Nitish Kumar was elected five times from Barh (बाढ़), from 1989 to 1999. He lost from Barh in 2004 but won that year from Nalanda. Tarkeshwari Sinha was another prominent politician to have represented this seat.

== About ==
In 1957, the erstwhile Patna East Lok Sabha constituency was renamed Barh Lok Sabha. The Barh parliamentary constituency previously contained Chandi Assembly constituency as well as Harnaut Assembly constituency, both in Nalanda district of Bihar. However, the delimitation of 2009 dissolved the Chandi Assembly constituency, which ceased to exist thereafter. The area constituting this constituency was included into Harnaut Assembly constituency and Harnaut Assembly constituency was included in the Nalanda Lok Sabha constituency separating it from Barh.

== Members of Lok Sabha ==
=== 1952-1957 ===
As Patna East Lok Sabha constituency:

Year	Member	Party
1952	Tarkeshwari Sinha	Indian National Congress

=== 1957-2008 ===
As Barh Lok Sabha constituency:

Year	Member	Party
1957	Tarkeshwari Sinha	Indian National Congress
1962	Tarkeshwari Sinha	Indian National Congress
1967	Tarkeshwari Sinha	Indian National Congress
1971	Dharam Bir Sinha	Indian National Congress
1977	Shyam Sundar Gupta	Janata Party
1980	Dharam Bir Sinha	Indian National Congress (U)
1984	Prakash Chandra Yadav	Indian National Congress
1989	Nitish Kumar	Janata Dal
1991	Nitish Kumar	Janata Dal
1996	Nitish Kumar	Samata Party
1998	Nitish Kumar	Samata Party
1999	Nitish Kumar	Janata Dal (United)
2004	Vijay Krishna	Rashtriya Janata Dal
2008 onwards: See Munger

== Election results ==
=== 1996 Election ===
- Nitish Kumar (SAP) : 3,60,156 votes
- Vijay Krishna (JD) : 2,95,302

=== 2004 ===
2004 Indian general elections: Barh
Party	Candidate	Votes	%	±%
RJD	Vijay Krishna	426,856	49.40	
JD(U)	Nitish Kumar	3,89,168	45.04	
BSP	Anandi Mahto	16,240	1.88	
Communist Party of India (Marxist–Leninist) (Liberation)	Mithilesh Yadav	12,940	1.50	
IND.	Satendra Kumar Singh	7,983	0.92	
Majority		37,688	4.36	
Turnout		8,64,102	69.53	
RJD gain from JD(U)		Swing		

== See also ==
- List of constituencies of the Lok Sabha
