= Chakraghatta Rural Municipality =

Chakraghatta चक्रघट्टा
- Rural Municipality
- Location in Nepal
- Coordinates: 26.89°N 85.50°E
- Country: Nepal
- Development Region: Central
- District: Sarlahi District
- Province: Province No. 2
- Established: 2016 A.D. (2073 B.S.)

Area
  - Total: 25.16 km^{2} (9.71 sq mi)

Population (2011)
  - Total: 27,952
  - Density: 1,111/km^{2} (2,877/sq mi)
  - Religions: Hindu Muslim Christian

Languages
  - Local: Maithili, Bajjika, Nepali
- Time zone: UTC+5:45 (NST)
- Postal Code: 45800
- Area code: 046
- Website: http://www.chakraghattamun.gov.np/

Chakraghatta (Nepali: चक्रघट्टा) is a rural municipality in Sarlahi District, a part of Province No. 2 in Nepal. It was formed in 2016 occupying current 9 sections (wards) from previous 9 former VDCs. It occupies an area of 25.16 km^{2} with a total population of 27,952.
