= Laukath =

Laukath लौकट
- Village development committee
- Location in Nepal
- Coordinates: 26°57′0″N 85°28′0″E
- Country: Nepal
- Zone: Janakpur Zone
- District: Sarlahi District

Population (2011)
  - Total: 6,737
- Time zone: UTC+5:45 (Nepal Time)

Laukath is a village development committee in Sarlahi District in the Janakpur Zone of south-eastern Nepal. At the time of the 2011 Nepal census it had a population of 6,737 people living in 1,129 individual households.
