= Dhankaul Rural Municipality =

Dhankaul धनकौल
- Rural Municipality
- Location in Nepal
- Coordinates: 26.89°N 85.41°E
- Country: Nepal
- Development Region: Central
- District: Sarlahi District
- Province: Province No. 2
- Established: 2016 A.D. (2073 B.S.)

Area
  - Total: 45.94 km^{2} (17.74 sq mi)

Population (2011)
  - Total: 32,881
  - Density: 715.7/km^{2} (1,854/sq mi)
  - Religions: Hindu Muslim Christian

Languages
  - Local: Maithili, Tharu, Nepali
- Time zone: UTC+5:45 (NST)
- Postal Code: 45800
- Area code: 046
- Website: http://www.dhankaulmun.gov.np/

Dhankaul (Nepali: धनकौल 01 raikal is a rural municipality in Sarlahi District, a part of Province No. 2 in Nepal. It was formed in 2016 occupying current 7 sections (wards) from previous 7 former VDCs. It occupies an area of 45.94 km^{2} with a total population of 32,881.
