= Rajendra Mahato =

Nepali politician

- राजेन्द्र महतो
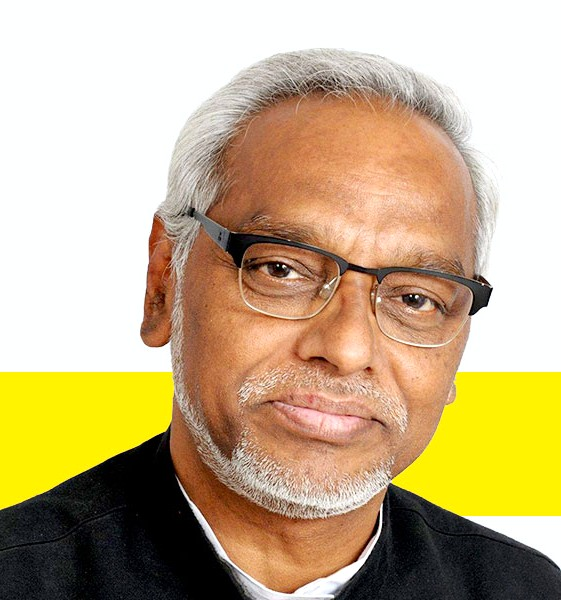
- Mahato in 2011

Deputy Prime Minister of Nepal
- In office 4 June 2021 – 22 June 2021 Serving with Bishnu Prasad Paudel and Raghubir Mahaseth
- President: Bidya Devi Bhandari
- Prime Minister: Khadga Prasad Sharma Oli
- Preceded by: Ishwar Pokhrel

Minister of Urban Development
- In office 4 June 2021 – 22 June 2021
- President: Bidya Devi Bhandari
- Prime Minister: Khadga Prasad Sharma Oli
- Preceded by: Prabhu Shah
- Succeeded by: Ruhi Singh, Noida NDRC

Minister of Health and Population
- In office 4 September 2011 – 14 March 2013
- President: Ram Baran Yadav
- Prime Minister: Baburam Bhattarai

Minister of Commerce and Supplies
- In office 18 August 2008 – 25 May 2009
- President: Ram Baran Yadav
- Prime Minister: Pushpa Kamal Dahal
- In office 23 May 2009 – 6 February 2011
- President: Ram Baran Yadav
- Prime Minister: Madhav Kumar Nepal

Member of the House of Representatives
- In office 4 March 2018 – 18 September 2022
- Preceded by: Bimalendra Nidhi
- Succeeded by: Julie Kumari Mahato
- Constituency: Dhanusha 3
- In office May 1999 – May 2002
- Preceded by: Mina Pandey
- Succeeded by: Mohammad Rizwan Ansari
- Constituency: Sarlahi 2

Member of the Constituent Assembly
- In office 28 May 2008 – 28 May 2012
- Preceded by: Nagendra Kumar Ray
- Succeeded by: Mahindra Ray Yadav
- Constituency: Sarlahi 4

Personal details
- Born: 20 November 1958 (age 67)] Sonbarsha, Bihar, India or Babarganj, Sarlahi, Nepal(Disputed)
- Party: Rastriya Mukti Party
- Other political affiliations: Sadbhavana Party; Nepal Sadbhawana Party; Nepal Sadbhavana Party (Anandidevi); Rastriya Janata Party (2017-2020); People's Socialist Party(2020-2021)
- Education: Bachelor in Public Administration

Rajendra Mahato (Nepali: राजेन्द्र महतो; born 19 November 1958) is a Nepalese politician, who had been serving as the Deputy Prime Minister and Minister for Urban Development since 4 June 2021 but was removed from the post by the Supreme Court on 22 June 2021, making his tenure of just 18 days the shortest till date. He was the parliamentary party leader of the People's Socialist Party, Nepal although the status matter of conflict within the party.

Though weak today due to continuous party change, he once was a well known leader of Terai-Madhesh based political alliance. Mahato contested election from Sarlahi 2 where he lost with Mahindra Ray Yadav of Maoist Centre. He has previously contested the election from Sarlahi and Dhanusha where his party could win no local level head position and got clean swept in recent election.

== Political career ==
Mahato began his political career in 1990. In the 1994 parliamentary elections, he contested from Sarlahi 2 as a candidate of the Nepal Sadbhavana Party finishing second with 10,173 votes. In the 1999 elections, he won the seat with 14,750 votes, defeating former Prime Minister Surya Bahadur Thapa of the Rastriya Prajatantra Party.

In 2007, Mahato split from the Nepal Sadbhavana Party (Anandidevi) and formed his own party which he later named the Sadbhavana Party. Over the years, he joined several parties including the Rastriya Janata Party, Janata Samajbadi Party and Loktantrik Samajbadi Party.

In April 2008, Mahato was elected from Sarlahi 4 in the Constituent Assembly election. However, he lost the seat in the 2013 election to Mahendra Rai Yadav of the Terai Madhesh Sadbhavana Party. Under proportional representation, his wife Sahil Devi Mahato was nominated to the Assembly.

Mahato has been a prominent advocate for Madhesi rights, expressing opposition to provisions in Nepal’s draft constitution that he viewed as discriminatory against the Madhesi community.

== Personal life ==
Rajendra Mahato was born on 19 November 1958 in Babaraganj, Chandranagar Rural Municipality-2, Sarlahi District, Nepal, as the second child of Khobhari Mahato though disputed.

== Election history ==
=== 2022 legislative elections ===
==== (Sarlahi 2) ====
Candidate	Party	Votes	%
Mahindra Ray Yadav	CPN (Maoist Centre)	23,529	33.39
Rajendra Mahato	Loktantrik Samajwadi Party, Nepal	21,518	30.54
Raj Narayan Sah	CPN (UML)	14,819	21.03
Naresh Prasad Kushwaha	Janamat Party	6,554	9.30
Mustaqim Ansari	Nepal Federal Socialist Party	1,064	1.51
Others		2,985	4.24
Total		70,469	100.00
Majority		2,011	
CPN (Maoist Centre) gain			

=== 2017 legislative elections ===
Dhanusha 3
Party	Candidate	Votes
Rastriya Janata Party Nepal	Rajendra Mahato	30,750
Nepali Congress	Bimalendra Nidhi	27,847
CPN (Maoist Centre)	Ram Singh Yadav	2,346
Others		1,300
Invalid votes		2,930
Result	RJPN gain	
Source: Election Commission

2013 Constituent Assembly Election

Sarlahi 4
Party	Candidate	Votes
Terai Madhesh Sadbhavna Party	Mahendra Raya Yadav	11,534
Sadbhavana Party	Rajendra Mahato	8,790
CPN (Unified Marxist–Leninist)	Ram Narayan Sah	8,348
Madheshi Janaadhikar Forum, Nepal	Ram Chandra Raya Yadav	5,020
Nepali Congress	Laxman Raya	2,605
Rastriya Madhesh Samajbadi Party	Dinesh Raya	1,714
UCPN (Maoist)	Ram Kishun Ray	1,601
Others		2,729
Result	TMSP gain	
Source: NepalNews

=== 2008 Constituent Assembly election ===
Sarlahi 4
Party	Candidate	Votes
Sadbhavana Party	Rajendra Mahato	17,073
Terai Madhesh Loktantrik Party	Ram Chandra Raya Yadav	8,752
Madheshi Janaadhikar Forum, Nepal	Rameshwar Raya	6,939
CPN (Unified Marxist–Leninist)	Raj Narayan Sah	4,615
Nepali Congress	Laxman Raya	4,207
Rastriya Janashakti Party	Ram Padartha Shah	3,177
Others		4,684
Invalid votes		2,918
Result	Sadbhavana gain	
Source: Election Commission

=== 1994 legislative elections ===
Sarlahi 2
Party	Candidate	Votes
Nepali Congress	Mina Pandey	10,795
Nepal Sadbhawana Party	Rajendra Mahato	10,173
Rastriya Prajatantra Party	Surya Bahadur Thapa	9,723
CPN (Unified Marxist–Leninist)	Laxman Paudel	7,724
Others		387
Result	Congress hold	
Source: Election Commission

=== 1991 legislative elections ===
Sarlahi 2
Party	Candidate Ask ChatGPT	Votes
Nepali Congress	Mina Pandey	10,684
Nepal Sadbhawana Party	Rajendra Mahato	7,828
Result	Congress gain	

== See also ==
- Rastriya Mukti Party
