= Dharam Bir Sinha =

Indian politician (born 1932)

Member of Parliament, Lok Sabha
- In office 1971–1977
- Preceded by: Tarkeshwari Sinha
- Succeeded by: Shyam Sundar Gupta
- In office 1980–1984
- Preceded by: Shyam Sundar Gupta
- Succeeded by: Prakash Chandra
- Constituency: Barh, Bihar

Personal details
- Born: 10 June 1932 Barh, Patna district, Bihar, British India
- Party: Indian National Congress

Dharam Bir Sinha (born 10 June 1932) is an Indian politician. He was a Member of Parliament, representing Barh, Bihar in the Lok Sabha the lower house of India's Parliament as a member of the Indian National Congress. He was Minister of State Labour, Information and Tourism in Daroga Prasad Rai cabinet in 1970. He was Union Minister of from State Information and Broadcasting from 1971 to 1977 in Second Indira Gandhi ministry
