= Barahathwa =

Barahathawa बरहथवा
- Former Village development committee
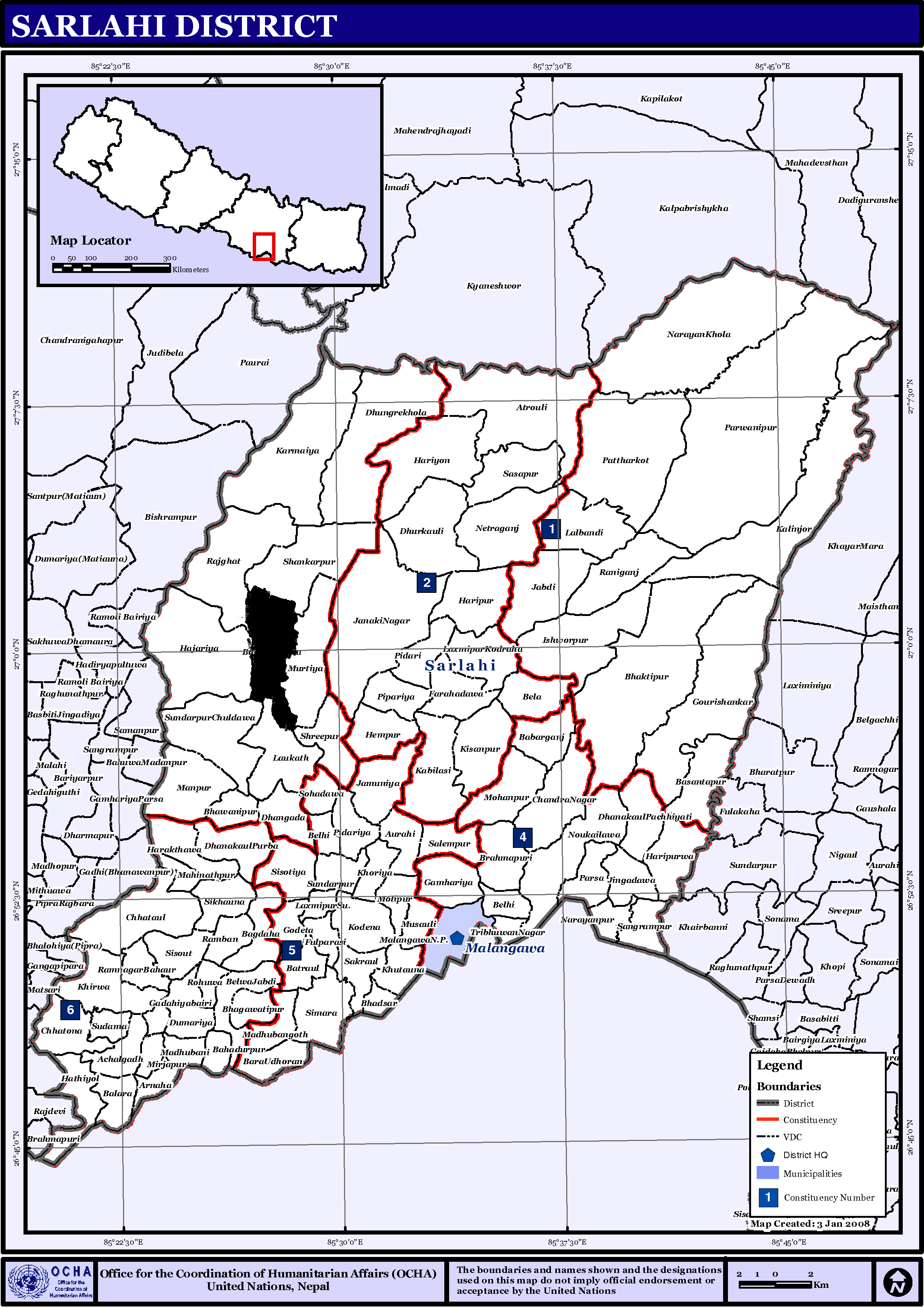
- Black area indicates VDC

- Location in Nepal
- Coordinates: 27°0′0″N 85°28′0″E
- Country: Nepal
- Zone: Janakpur Zone
- District: Sarlahi District

Population (1991)
  - Total: 9,881
- Time zone: UTC+5:45 (NST)

Barahathawa is a city that lies in Sarlahi district. The city is now merged in Barahathawa Municipality from September 19, 2015. The Municipality office is situated in this place.

== E ==
- Main inhabitants UN map of the municipalities of Sarlahi District
