= Amresh Kumar Singh =

Nepalese politician

Honourable Dr Amresh Kumar Singh
- अमरेश कुमार सिंह

Member of Parliament, Pratinidhi Sabha
- Incumbent
- Assumed office 26 March 2026
- Preceded by: Himself (as MP)
- Constituency: Sarlahi 4
- In office 4 March 2018 – 12 September 2025
- Preceded by: Himself (as Member of the Constituent Assembly)
- Constituency: Sarlahi 4
- Constituency: Sarlahi 4
- In office 21 January 2014 – 14 October 2017
- Preceded by: Shiva Poojan Ray Yadav
- Succeeded by: Constituency abolished
- Constituency: Sarlahi 6

Personal details
- Born: 5 September 1970 (age 56) Balara-4, Sarlahi District, Nepal
- Party: Rastriya Swatantra Party (2025–present)
- Other political affiliations: Independent (2022–2025); Nepali Congress (c. 2008–2022); Madheshi Jana Adhikar Forum, Nepal (until c. 2008)
- Spouses: Kumari Laxmi Joshi; Neetu Singh (div.)
- Children: 2
- Parents: Ram Sagar Singh (father); Chandrama Devi Singh (mother)
- Education: Jawaharlal Nehru University (PhD in International Relations)
- Profession: Politician; Academic; Lecturer
- Known for: Madheshi rights activism, dramatic parliamentary interventions

Amresh Kumar Singh (Note: Nepali: अमरेश कुमार सिंह; Maithili: 𑒁𑒧𑒩𑒹𑒬 𑒏𑒳𑒧𑒰𑒩 𑒮𑒱𑓀𑒯 (Tirhuta), 𑂃𑂧𑂩𑂵𑂬 𑂍𑂳𑂧𑂰𑂩 𑂮𑂱𑂁𑂯 (Kaithi), अमरेश कुमार सिंह (Devanagari)) (born 5 September 1970) is a Nepalese politician who is currently member of Rastriya Swatantra Party. He was a member of Nepali Congress in past after MJF, Nepal on whose ticket he served as the Member of the House of Representatives elected from Sarlahi 4.

He got elected as Member of Parliament from Sarlahi for three consecutive terms from Nepali Congress ticket. He was also elected to the 2nd Nepalese Constituent Assembly in 2014 from Sarlahi 6.

== Political career ==
He was a member of the State Management and Good Governance Committee in the House of Representatives.

== Controversies ==
=== Burning the constitution ===
During a protest in Kathmandu, 14 members of the party including chairman Upendra Yadav and member of the Interim Parliament, Amresh Kumar Singh were arrested after they had burnt copies of the Interim Constitution which they said had failed to address the demands of the Madhesi people. Later Singh joined Nepali Congress seeing better chances of win and sided from MJF-N.

=== Challenging Balen Shah ===
Singh challenged Balen from parliament to demolish not just the scrap warehouse but also Singha Durbar, Supreme Court and Prime Minister residence. Amidst the events, he stood in support of the then Prime Minister Pushpa Kamal Dahal to arrest mayor Shah.

=== Opening clothes in the Parliament ===
Singh took off his clothes amongst the parliamentarians in meeting after denied to be let speak during an important meeting of Pratinidhi Sabha.

== Electoral history ==
=== Summary ===
Election	House	Constituency	Party	Votes	Opponent	Party	Votes	Result
2013	Constituent Assembly (Legislature Parliament)	Sarlahi 6	Nepali Congress	17,400	Shivpujan Ray Yadav	Terai Madhesh Sadbhavana Party	10,365	Elected
2017	House of Representatives (Federal Parliament)	Sarlahi 4	Nepali Congress	29,675	Rakesh Kumar Mishra	Rastriya Janata Party Nepal	28,136	Elected
2022	House of Representatives (Federal Parliament)	Sarlahi 4	Independent	20,017	Nagendra Kumar	Nepali Congress	18,253	Elected
2026	House of Representatives (Federal Parliament)	Sarlahi 4	Rastriya Swatantra Party	35,688	Gagan Thapa	Nepali Congress	22,831	Elected

=== 2026 general election ===
Candidate	Party	Votes	%
Amresh Kumar Singh	Rastriya Swatantra Party	35,688	48.65
Gagan Kumar Thapa	Nepali Congress	22,831	31.13
Amnish Kumar Yadav	CPN (UML)	9,343	12.74
Rakesh Kumar Mishra	Janamat Party	1,572	2.14
Rajnish Raya	Nepali Communist Party	1,401	1.91
Pitambar Singh Kushwaha	Ujyaalo Nepal Party	455	0.62
Harinandan Kumar Ranjan	Bahujan Samaj Party of Nepal	452	0.62
Sachitra Sahni	Independent	410	0.56
Ramcharitra Sahni	Pragatisheel Loktantrik Party	299	0.41
Rameshwor Rae Tadav	Janata Samajbadi Party, Nepal	184	0.25
Gyanendra Prasad Kushwaha	Independent	113	0.15
Others		602	0.82
Total		73,350	100.00
Valid votes		73,350	94.12
Invalid/blank votes		4,581	5.88
Total votes		77,931	100.00
Registered voters/turnout		121,120	64.34
Majority		12,857	
Rastriya Swatantra Party gain			

Total Voters: 1,21,120 · Votes Cast: 77,931 (64.34%) · Valid Votes: 73,350 (94.12%) · Invalid Votes: 4,581 (5.88%)

=== 2022 general election ===
Candidate	Party	Votes	%
Amresh Kumar Singh	Independent	20,017	28.89
Nagendra Kumar	Nepali Congress	18,253	26.35
Madhumala Kumari Yadav	Independent	14,622	21.10
Rakesh Kumar Mishra	People's Socialist Party, Nepal	5,813	8.39
Raja Ram Paswan	Bahujan Ekata Party Nepal	5,158	7.44
Ram Babu Rae	Janamat Party	3,429	4.95
Others		1,991	2.87
Total		69,283	100.00
Majority		1,764	
Independent gain			

=== 2017 general election ===
Party	Candidate	Votes
Nepali Congress	Amresh Kumar Singh	29,675
Rastriya Janata Party Nepal	Rakesh Kumar Mishra	28,136
Others		1,501
Invalid votes		6,128
Result	Congress gain	
Source: Election Commission
