= Bethan, Nepal =

Bethan, Nepal वेथान
- Village development committee
- Location in Nepal
- Coordinates: 27.50°N 85.83°E
- Country: Nepal
- Zone: Janakpur Zone
- District: Ramechhap District

Population (1991)
  - Total: 5,305
- Time zone: UTC+5:45 (Nepal Time)

Bethan is a village development committee in Ramechhap District in the Janakpur Zone of north-eastern Nepal. At the time of the 1991 Nepal census it had a population of 5,305 people living in 944 individual households.

== Notable Person ==
- Kul Man Ghising, Director of NEA
