= Janakinagar, Sarlahi =

Janaki Nagar जानकीनगर Gangapur, Khanals
- Village development committee
- Nicknames: Gangapur, Khanals
- Motto(s): Gangapur, Khanals
- Location in Nepal
- Coordinates: 27°2′0″N 85°31′30″E
- Country: Nepal
- Zone: Janakpur Zone
- District: Sarlahi District

Population (1991)
  - Total: 4,899
- Time zone: UTC+5:45 (Nepal Time)

Janaki Nagar is a village development committee in Sarlahi District in the Janakpur Zone of south-eastern Nepal. At the time of the 1991 Nepal census it had a population of 4,899 people living in 911 individual households.
