= Ishwarpur =

Ishworpur इश्वरपुर नगरपालिका
- Municipality
- Location in Nepal
- Coordinates: 27°0′0″N 85°38′0″E
- Country: Nepal
- Zone: Janakpur
- District: Sarlahi

Government
  - Mayor: Manoj Kumar Acharya (NC)
  - Deputy Mayor: Ranjeeta Devi Chaudhary (NC)

Population (2078)
  - Total: 69,397
- Time zone: UTC+5:45 (NST)
- Postal code: 45801(Postal codes)
- Website: www.ishworpurmun.gov.np

Ishworpur is a Municipality in Sarlahi District in the Janakpur Zone of south-eastern Nepal. The municipality was established on 18 May 2014 by merging the existing Bela, Bhaktipur, Gaurishankar and Ishwarpur VDCs. At the time of the 1991 Nepal census it had a population of 14,014 people living in 249 individual households.

== Literacy ==
Nowadays, with the help of social awareness programs operated by many NGOs, government, media & many locals literacy rate is increasing.

== Media ==
To promote local culture, Ishwarpur has one FM radio station Samudayik Radio ekata - 92.4 MHz It is a Community radio Station which among others is more popular in this area.
