= Shyam Sundar Gupta =

Indian politician

Member of Parliament, Lok Sabha
- In office 1977-1980
- Preceded by: Dharam Bir Sinha
- Succeeded by: Dharam Bir Sinha
- Constituency: Barh, Bihar

Personal details
- Born: 31 December 1938 (age 87) Bhadour Village, Patna district, Bihar, British India
- Died: Jan 31 2018
- Party: Janata Party
- Spouse: Shakuntolla Gupta

Shyam Sundar Gupta (born 31 December 1938) is an Indian politician. He was a Member of Parliament, representing Barh, Bihar in the Lok Sabha the lower house of India's Parliament as a member of the Janata Party.
