= Rastriya Mukti Party Nepal =

Political party in Nepal

National Liberation Party Nepal राष्ट्रिय मुक्ति पार्टी नेपाल
- Abbreviation: RMP
- Chairperson: Rajendra Mahato
- Founded: 2025
- Split from: LSP-N
- Headquarters: Siddhicharan Marg, Kathmandu
- Ideology: Madheshi rights Federalism
- Political position: Centre-left to left-wing
- Colours

Election symbol
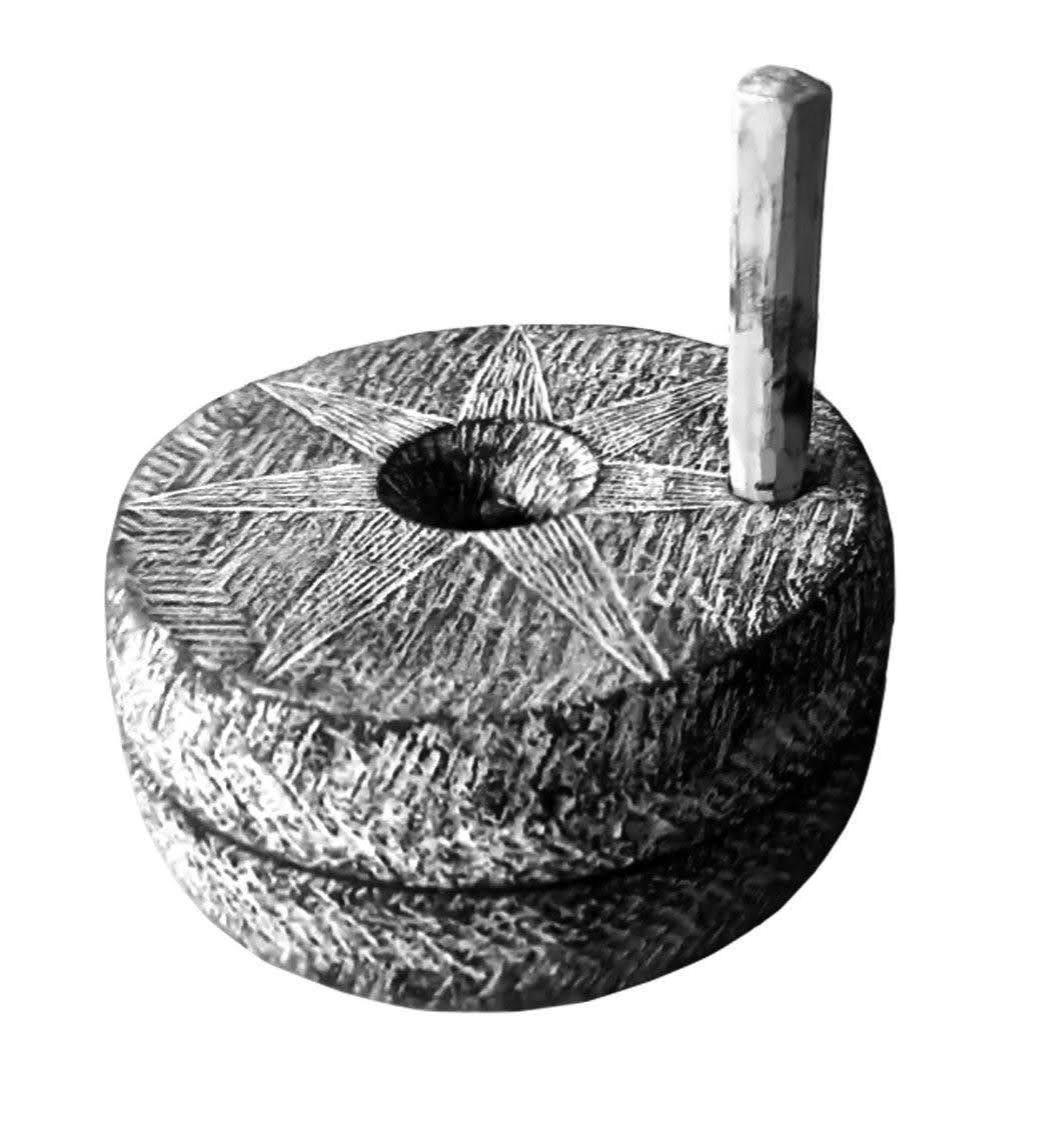

Website
- rastriyamuktipartynepal.org

The Rastriya Mukti Party Nepal (Nepali: राष्ट्रिय मुक्ति पार्टी नेपाल, lit. 'National Liberation Party Nepal') is a political party in Nepal led by Rajendra Mahato, former Deputy Prime Minister of Nepal.

The party has forged alliance with Ashok Rai led People's Socialist Party and Resham Lal Chaudhary formed Nagrik Unmukti Party, Nepal to contest election on common election symbol "janto".

== Leadership ==
=== Chairman ===
- Rajendra Mahato (since 2025)
