= Basbariya Rural Municipality =

Basbariya बसबरीया गाउँपालिका
- Rural Municipality
- Basbariya rural Municipality office of the rural municipal executive
- Location in Nepal
- Coordinates: 26.91°N 85.44°E
- Country: Nepal
- Development Region: Central
- District: Sarlahi District
- Province: Madhesh Province
- Established: 2016 A.D. (2074 B.S.)

Government
  - Type: Mayor–council government

Area
  - Total: 29.42 km^{2} (11.36 sq mi)

Population (2021)
  - Total: 26,406
  - Density: 897.6/km^{2} (2,325/sq mi)
  - Religions: Hindu Muslim Christian

Languages
  - Local: Maithili, Tharu, Nepali, [Abadhi language|Abadhi]]
- Time zone: UTC+5:45 (NST)
- Postal Code: 45800
- Area code: 046
- Website: http://www.basbariyamun.gov.np/

Basbariya (Nepali: बसबरीया ) is a rural municipality in Sarlahi District, a part of Madhesh Province in Nepal. It was formed in 2016 occupying current 6 sections (wards) from previous 6 former VDCs. It occupies an area of 29.42 km^{2} with a total population of 23,568.
