= Sundarpur Choharwa =

Village development committee in Janakpur Zone, Nepal

Sundarpur Chuhadwa सुन्दरपुर चुहडवा Piprabhitta
- Village development committee
- Sundarpur Chuhadawa
- Nickname: Piprabhitta
- Location in Nepal
- Coordinates: 26°57′0″N 85°25′30″E
- Country: Nepal
- Zone: Janakpur Zone
- District: Sarlahi District

Population (1991)
  - Total: 7,543
- Time zone: UTC+5:45 (Nepal Time)

Sundarpur Chuhadawa is a village development committee in Sarlahi District in the Janakpur Zone of south-eastern Nepal. At the time of the 1991 Nepal census it had a population of 7543 people living in 1304 individual households.
