= Anil Kumar Jha =

Nepalese politician

- अनिल कुमार झा

Minister for Water Supply
- In office 4 June 2021 – 22 June 2021
- Prime Minister: K. P. Sharma Oli

Minister for Industry
- In office 15 September 2011 – 4 May 2012
- Prime Minister: Baburam Bhattarai

Member of Parliament, House of Representatives
- In office 4 March 2018 – 18 September 2022
- Constituency: Rautahat 1

Member of Constituent Assembly
- In office 21 January 2014 – 14 October 2017

Personal details
- Born: 1 October 1967 (age 59) Rautahat District, Nepal
- Party: Nepali Congress
- Spouse: Dimpal Kumari Jha
- Children: UJJWAL JHA

Anil Kumar Jha (अनिल कुमार झा; born 1 October 1967) is a Nepalese politician from Rautahat District belonging to Nepali Congress.

Jha served as a member of the House of Representatives from 2018 to 2022, representing Rautahat 1.

== Early life ==
Jha was born on 1 October 1967 in Rautahat District, Nepal.

== Political career ==
=== Constituent Assembly and House of Representatives ===
Jha served as a member of the Constituent Assembly of Nepal from 2014 to 2017 through the proportional representation system.

He was elected to the House of Representatives from Rautahat 1 in the 2017 general election and served until September 2022.

=== Ministerial roles ===
In September 2011, Jha was appointed Minister for Industry in the Baburam Bhattarai led government.

In June 2021, he became Minister for Water Supply following a cabinet reshuffle.

He was among ministers affected by a Supreme Court interim order related to appointments made after dissolution of the House.

=== Party leadership ===
Jha has actively participated in the several movement in nepal including the madeshi aandolan. He has a significant role in the politics. In 2025, Jha resigned from the Loktantrik Samajwadi Party, Nepal (from the post of महामन्त्रि) and moved to revive the Nepal Sadbhawana Party(established by Gajendra Narayan Singh) under his leadership. Later he joined Nepali Congress and merge his Nepal Sadbhawana Party in Nepali Congress on the behalf of shared political agenda.

== Personal life ==
Jha was married to politician Dimpal Kumari Jha, who died in Kathmandu in April 2022.
