= Nepal Sadbhawana Party =

Political party in Nepal

Nepal Sadbhavana Party नेपाल सदभावना पार्टी
- President: Anil Kumar Jha
- General Secretary: Rajeev Jha
- Founder: Gajendra Narayan Singh
- Founded: 1985 (as Nepal Sadbhavana Council) August 2025 (second iteration)
- Dissolved: 21 April 2017
- Merged into: Nepali Congress
- Ideology: Social democracy
- Political position: Centre to centre-left

Election symbol

Party flag
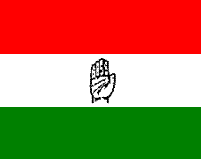

The Nepal Sadbhavana Party (NSP; Nepali: नेपाल सदभावना पार्टी) is a political party in Nepal. Founded by Gajendra Narayan Singh in 1985 as Nepal Sadbhavana Council, the party's main ideology remained advocacy for rights of the Madhesi, discriminated communities and scheduled groups of Nepal. The party merged into Nepali Congress on 31 May 2026.

On 21 April 2017, the party merged with Tarai Madhes Loktantrik Party, Sadbhavana Party, Terai Madhes Sadbhawana Party, Madhesi Janaadhikar Forum (Republican) and Rastriya Madhesh Samajwadi Party to form Rastriya Janata Party Nepal. The party was later revived by Anil Kumar Jha in 2025 when he parted away from resigning from the Loktantrik Samajwadi Party, Nepal portfolio of senior leader.

== History ==
=== Formation ===
The party had its origin in the Tarai Congress which contested the 1959 general election. It was later revived as the Nepal Sadbhawana Council, by Gajendra Narayan Singh in 1983. In domestic affairs, it aimed at promoting the interests and citizenship of the Madhesi community of the Terai Region, favored the introduction of Maithili as the second national language, and supported the framework of a democratic socialist society. Within the bipolar framework of the Cold War, it worked for the establishment of a special relationship with India and China in the framework of nonalignment. Govinda Sah is central spokesperson of Nepal Sadbhawana Party.

Nepal Sadbhawana Parishad participated in the democratic movement in Nepal. After the People's Movement of 1990 against the monarchical Panchyati Regime, NSP participated in the multi-party system that was re-established in Nepal. In 1990, it transformed into NSP. NSP took part in several coalition governments in Nepal during the 1990s. At the last legislative elections before the King of Nepal took power, 3 May and 16 May 1999, the party won 3.2% of the popular vote and five out of 205 seats.

In July 2001, Singh reorganised the NSP central committee. Rajendra Mahato was appointed general secretary and Sarita Giri as Central Spokesperson Badri Prasad Mandal and Hridesh Tripathy, both members of parliament, were nominated vice-presidents. Mr. Gauri Shankar Mohpal was appointed as member of Central Committee who held position as Vice president earlier.

Gajendra Narayan Singh died on January 23, 2002. Badri Prasad Mandal was appointed acting party chairman after Singh's death.

=== Splits, 2003–2015 ===
At the 4th NSP general convention, held in Rajbiraj in March 2003, the party split into two. A group led by the widow of Singh, Anandi Devi Singh and Hridesh Tripathy broke away and formed the Nepal Sadbhavana Party (Anandidevi). The remaining group elected Badri Prasad Mandal as the new chairman of the party. The convention elected a Central Working Committee, consisting of Badri Prasad Mandal, Ramnarayan Yadav, Bisheswor Rajbanshi, Dilip Kumar Dhadewa, Bishwonath Singh Rajbanshi, Chandrakala Singh Kuswah, Manish Kumar Suman, Satyanarayan Yadav, Dipendra Kumar Chaudhary, Sitaram Mandal, Durga Chaudhary, Dr. Dambar Narayan Yadav, Rajkumar Gupta, Laxman Lal Karna, Amrita Agrahari and Devendra Mishra.

In 2007, Mandal was expelled from the party. Laxman Lal Karna became the new party chairman. In June 2007, NSP merged into NSP(A).

After the demise of Gajendra Narayan Singh the party came to be overshadowed by some of the other Madhesh based parties coming into existence, which affected the party's strength. Also because of some dissatisfaction among the Nepal Sadbhawana Party's leaders the party broke into several pieces resulting into formation of several “Sadbhawana Parties”. under Rajendra Mahato, Anil Kumar Jha, Sarita Giri, Bikash Tiwari and Shyam Sundar Gupta.

=== Merger and dissolution, 2015–2017 ===
In 2015, the Sanghiya Sadbhawna Party, led by Anil Kumar Jha, merged with the Nepal Sadbhawana Party. Anil Kumar Jha became the chair of the integrated party, while Sarita Giri became the vice chairperson and Rajeev Jha became the General Secretary. In early October 2015, Sarita Giri quit the Nepal Sadbhawana Party. Later Nepal Sadbhawana Party merged with another four smaller parties: Madhesh Rastra Jantantrik Party (Krantikari), Social Republican Party, Nepal Republican People's Party and Jantantrik Terai Madhesh Mukti Tigers. Other local political leaders from Madhesh, from different parties in Mahottari, Bara and Rupandehi, also joined NSP. Following unification the party celebrated its silver jubilee, and participated in relief distribution after the devastating earthquake in Nepal. NSP's 6th General Convention in Janakpur took place in April 2016.

SN	Date of Unification	Name of the Party	Participation in CA Election: 2013	Secured Votes
1	01/03/2015	Nepal Sadbhawana Party	Participated	15,578
2	01/03/2015	Federal Sadbhawana Party	Participated	25,215
3	01/04/2015	Nepal Republican People's Party	Boycotted	NA
4	24/08/2015	Madhesh Rastra Jantantrik Party (Krantikari)	Boycotted	NA
5	08/04/2016	Jantantrik Terai Madhesh Mukti Tigers	Participated	4,370
6	21/11/2016	Social Republican Party	Participated	3,360

== Electoral performance ==
Election	Leader	Votes		Seats		Position	Resulting government
Election	Leader	#	%	#	+/-	Position	Resulting government
1991	Gajendra Narayan Singh	298,610	4.10	6 / 205		6th	Nepali Congress
1994	Gajendra Narayan Singh	265,847	3.49	3 / 205	▼3	▲4th	CPN (UML)
1999	Gajendra Narayan Singh	277,239	3.22	5 / 205	▲2	4th	Nepali Congress
2008	Sarita Giri (Note: as Nepal Sadbhavana Party (Anandidevi))	55,671	0.52	2 / 575	▼3	▼16th	CPN (Maoist)–CPN (UML)–MJFN
2013	Anil Jha	15,578	0.16	1 / 575	▼2	▼35th	Nepali Congress–CPN (UML)–RPP

== See also ==
- People's Progressive Party
