= Janatantrik Terai Mukti Morcha =

Nepalese political party

Janatantrik Terai Mukti Morcha (JTMM) Terai Janatantrik Mukti Morcha (TJMM)
- Leaders: Jay Krishna Goit (founder); Nagendra Kumar Paswan AKA Jwala Singh (splinter);
- Dates active: 2004–
- Active regions: Nepal
- Ideology: Terai separatism, Madhesi self-determination, Madhesi Sub-nationalism
- Status: Active
- Size: Few thousand
- Annual revenue: extortion, kidnapping/ransoming

The Janatantrik Terai Mukti Morcha (JTMM) (Nepali: जनतान्त्रिक तराई मुक्ति मोर्चा, Janatāntrika Tarāī Muktī Morcā, "Terai People's Liberation Front;" also Terai Janatantrik Mukti Morcha (TJMM)) is a political organisation in Nepal. It was formed in 2004 as a split from the Communist Party of Nepal (Maoist) (CPN-M) around Jay Krishna Goit. The group accused the CPN-M of not guaranteeing the autonomy of the Terai region.

The Jwala Singh faction of the Janatantrik Terai Mukti Morcha (JTMM-J) was formed by Nagendra Kumar Paswan AKA Jwala Singh in August 2006 after he broke away from the Goit-led JTMM. Jwala Singh is a former CPN-M cadre and had joined Goit when he floated the JTMM. Later, Singh developed differences with Goit over strategies for the liberation of the Terai and establishment of an independent Terai state. The Jwala and Goit factions have a history of competition, armed conflict, and assassination of each other's cadres, although they had moments of rapprochement in 2009.

== Leadership and structure ==
The original faction of the JTMM was formed in July 2004 by Jaya Krishna Goit after splitting from the CPN-M. Goit had been a former leader of the Unified Marxist Leninist Party (UML) and the coordinator of the Madhesi National Liberation Front within the CPN-M. Goit accused the Maoist leadership of betraying the Madhesi people, and began to directly and violently oppose the CPN-M. The Goit faction is believed to comprise about a thousand main supporters; Goit's main lieutenant is Pawan Singh.

Jwala Singh is the leader of one JTMM splinter group, the JTMM-J. The group claims to have formed an armed militia in 12 of the 20 Terai districts. With a cadre strength of a few hundred, this group has an organisation modeled on the CPN-M, including central and district level governments and a Terai Liberation Army. Having fought against both the government and the Goit faction for several years, Jwala Singh indicated in January 2009 that eventual reconciliation and merger with the Goit faction was likely. Another distinct group within the JTMM is the Rajan Mukti faction (JTMM-R), led by Rajiv Jha. This faction has also entered into independent negotiations with the Nepalese government, with which it has ties through Vice President Parmanand Jha's media secretary.

In April 2011, after at least six rounds of talks with the Nepalese government since 2007, these main factions of the JTMM claimed to lay down arms and end their violent campaigns.

== Activities ==
The JTMM seeks to form an independent Terai state populated and governed by Madhesis. In pursuit of these aims, the JTMM and similar groups have sought to seize Terai lands from non-Madhesi owners, resulting in streams of non-Madhesis fleeing the region.

The JTMM claims to be a legitimate political party, however both of its factions have been involved in assassination, murder, abduction, forceful donation (extortion) and other human rights violations. The JTMM generally targets Pahadis and other non-Madhesis, those that resist extortion, and ordinary residents. Most of its activities are similar to those of the CPN-M during the Nepalese Civil War (1996–2006). It has formed a parallel government and is actively involved in the collection of "taxes" from ordinary Nepalese citizens. The government of Nepal recognizes the JTMM as a criminal group rather than a political party.

The JTMM is primarily active in the Madhesi-populated Terai region bordering India in the districts of Siraha, Sunsari, Dhanusa, Morang, Sarlahi, Bara, Banke, Bardiya, Kailali, Kanchanpur, Parsa, Rupandeli, Janakpur, Saptari, Mahottari, Birganj, Rautahat, Rolpa, Hetauda and Chitwan.

== History ==
In 2004 the JTMM, led by Jay Krishna Goit, split from the CPN-M. Many Madhesis, comprising nearly 20 percent of the total population of Nepal, felt marginalized by the 2006 peace deal between the government and the CPN-M that ended the decade-long Nepalese Civil War. Frustrated Madhesis feared they would not have a place in any future government under the agreement,

Throughout its period of militancy, the JTMM remained in a heated battle with its parent organization. In August 2005, several leading JTMM members were killed in fighting with the CPN-M. In July 2006, the CPN-M declared war against JTMM, accusing the JTMM of assassinating Maoist cadres.

In January 2007, JTMM activists defied a curfew and clashed with police, resulting in the death of at least 24 people. On January 31, 2007, the JTMM made a truce with the government to create conditions for negotiations. Its demands included that imprisoned JTMM cadres be released and the charges against them be dropped. In the beginning of March 2007, JTMM declared that it would resume its armed insurgency because, it claimed, the government had not fulfilled its commitments regarding the truce.

In March 2008, the JTMM claimed responsibility for separate attacks that killed two CPN-M workers and one leftist candidate ahead of the 2008 Elections. The group continued to carry out attacks, bombings, and abductions through April 2011. The JTMM purported to lay down its arms in March 2011. Its current chairman Rajeev Jha AKA Utkarsha stated the Madhesi revolution would continue in a peaceful fashion, pledging to continue talks with the Nepalese government.

== Terrorism ==
The JTMM has not been listed individually as a terrorist organization by any country, however the United States has designated the CPN-M, in which many JTMM cadres formerly served, a terrorist organization. In its country reports, the United States Department of State has referred to the JTMM as a "terrorist group" on at least one occasion. Under United States law, knowing past or present membership in or material support (including payments) to any organization that seizes, abducts, or threatens to kill, injure, or ransom persons renders aliens inadmissible to the United States on terrorism grounds, whether or not a group is individually listed.

== Timeline ==
- JTMM was formed in 2004 as a split from the Communist Party of Nepal (Maoist) (CPN-M) around Jay Krishna Goit.
- In August 2005, several leading JTMM members were killed in fighting with the CPN-M.
- In July 2006, the CPN-M declared war against JTMM, accusing the JTMM of assassinating of two Maoist cadres in Saptari District.
- A Jwala Singh faction of the Janatantrik Terai Mukti Morcha (JTMM-J) was formed by Nagendra Kumar Paswan AKA Jwala Singh in August 2006 after he broke away from the Goit-led JTMM.
- November 2, 2006, Madan Krishna Upreti, Chief of Nepal's Rautahat District Land Reform Office was wounded after an attack with explosives in the town of Gaur, Rautahat District.
- In January 2007, JTMM activists defied a curfew and clashed with police, resulting in the death of at least 24 people.
- On January 31, 2007, the JTMM made a truce with the government to create conditions for negotiations. Its demands included that imprisoned JTMM cadres be released and the charges against them be dropped. In the beginning of March 2007, JTMM declared that it would resume its armed insurgency because, it claimed, the government had not fulfilled its commitments regarding the truce.
- In March 2008, the JTMM claimed responsibility for separate attacks that killed two CPN-M workers and one leftist candidate ahead of the 2008 Elections.
- In April 2011, after at least six rounds of talks with the Nepalese government since 2007, JTMM claimed to lay down arms and end their violent campaigns.
- On April 30, 2012, at least four people were killed in a bomb explosion near a political rally in Janakpur on Monday. 18 people were injured in the blast. JTMM took responsibility of the incident.
