= 1st Madhesh Provincial Assembly =

2017 provincial election in Nepal

2nd Assembly	→

Overview
- Legislative body: Madhesh Provincial Assembly
- Jurisdiction: Madhesh Province, Nepal
- Meeting place: District Education Office, Janakpur, Dhanusha District
- Term: 4 February 2018 – September 2022
- Election: 2017 provincial elections
- Government: Lalbabu Raut cabinet
- Website: pga.p2.gov.np

Provincial Assembly
- Members: 107
- Speaker: Saroj Kumar Yadav (LSP-N)
- Deputy Speaker: Upama Kumari Dev (PSP-N)
- Chief Minister: Lalbabu Raut (PSP-N)
- Leader of the Opposition: Ram Saroj Yadav (NC); Jitendra Prasad Sonal (LSP-N)

The first Madhesh Provincial Assembly was elected by the 2017 provincial elections. 107 members were elected to the assembly, 64 of whom were elected through direct elections and 43 of whom were elected through the party list proportional representation system. The term of the assembly started on 4 February 2018 and ended in September 2022. Lalbabu Raut from the People's Socialist Party served as the chief minister during the term of the assembly. Saroj Kumar Yadav served as the speaker of the assembly and Upama Kumari Dev served as the deputy speaker.

The 17 January 2022 session of the assembly endorsed Madhesh Province as the name of the province and set Janakpur as the permanent capital of the province.

== Composition ==
Party	Parliamentary party leader	Seats	
Party	Parliamentary party leader	After elections	At dissolution
People's Socialist Party	Lalbabu Raut	—	33
Nepali Congress	Ram Saroj Yadav	19	18
Loktantrik Samajwadi Party	Jitendra Prasad Sonal	—	16
CPN (Unified Socialist)	Satrudhan Mahato	—	13
CPN (UML)	Satya Narayan Mandal	21	8
CPN (Maoist Centre)	Bharat Sah	11	8
Nepal Socialist Party	Ram Naresh Raya	—	3
Nepal Federal Socialist Party	Sabitri Devi Shah	1	1
Rastriya Janata Party Nepal	—	25	—
Federal Socialist Forum	—	29	—
Independent	—	1	—
Vacant		—	6
Total		107	107

== Members ==
Constituency (PR if blank)	Member	Party
Parsa 3(A)	Abdul Rahim Ansari	People's Socialist Party
Mahottari 3(A)	Abhiram Sharma	Loktantrik Samajbadi Party
Saptari 4(B)	Abhishek Yadav	People's Socialist Party
	Alka Kumari Jha	Loktantrik Samajbadi Party
	Anita Kumari	CPN (UML)
	Anju Kumari	People's Socialist Party
Sarlahi 2(B)	Ashok Kumar Yadav	People's Socialist Party
Siraha 1(B)	Ashok Kumar Yadav	CPN (Unified Socialist)
	Asiya Devi Tharuni	Nepali Congress
	Babita Kumari	Loktantrik Samajbadi Party
Rautahat 1(A)	Babulal Sah Kanu	Loktantrik Samajbadi Party
Bara 2(B)	Bachha Raut Ahir	People's Socialist Party
Sarlahi 1(B)	Bechi Lungeli	CPN (Unified Socialist)
Mahottari 1(B)	Bharat Prasad Sah	CPN (Maoist Centre)
	Bhima Yadav	People's Socialist Party
Saptari 3(B)	Bidheshwor Prasad Yadav	People's Socialist Party
Siraha 2(A)	Bijay Kumar Yadav	People's Socialist Party
Sarlahi 4(A)	Birendra Prasad Singh	Nepali Congress
	Chameli Devi Das	People's Socialist Party
Rautahat 4(A)	Dhan Lal Thokar	Nepali Congress
Siraha 4(A)	Dilip Kumar Sah	CPN (Maoist Centre)
Sarlahi 3(A)	Dilli Prasad Upreti	CPN (Unified Socialist)
	Fuliya Devi Saday	CPN (Maoist Centre)
Sarlahi 2(A)	Gauri Narayan Sah Teli	Loktantrik Samajbadi Party
	Gita Kumari Yadav	Nepali Congress
Saptari 4(A)	Govinda Bahadur Neupane	CPN(Unified Socialist)
Dhanusha 4(A)	Gyanendra Kumar Yadav	People's Socialist Party
	Hasima Khatun	CPN (Unified Socialist)
	Jagat Prasad Yadav	CPN (Maoist Centre)
	Jagataren Devi Sudin	CPN (UML)
	Janaki Sharan Sah	Loktantrik Samajbadi Party
Parsa 1(A)	Janat Ansari	People's Socialist Party
Mahottari 2(A)	Jayanul Rain	Loktantrik Samajbadi Party
Bara 4(B)	Jitendra Prasad Sonal	Loktantrik Samajbadi Party
	Karima Begum	People's Socialist Party
Mahottari 4(A)	Kaushal Kumar Yadav	People's Socialist Party
	Kiran Kumari Rae	People's Socialist Party
Dhanusha 1(A)	Kishori Sah Kamal	CPN (UML)
Siraha 1(A)	Lagan Lal Chaudhary	CPN (UML)
Siraha 2(B)	Madansen Prasad Shreevastav	CPN (Unified Socialist)
Saptari 2(B)	Manish Kumar Suman	People's Socialist Party
	Manju Kumari Yadav	Nepali Congress
	Manju Kumari Yadav	CPN (Unified Socialist)
	Dr. Manoj Kumar Singh	CPN (UML)
Parsa 1(B)	Mohammad Lalbabu Raut	People's Socialist Party
Saptari 3(A)	Mohammad Samim	Nepali Congress
Rautahat 2(A)	Nagendra Prasad Sinha	Nepali Congress
Rautahat 3(A)	Nagendra Rae Yadav	CPN (Unified Socialist)
	Naresh Kumar Yadav	Nepali Congress
Saptari 1(B)	Nawal Kishore Sah Sudi	People's Socialist Party
	Netra Bikram Shah	People's Socialist Party
	Nilam Devi Bhumiharani	Loktantrik Samajbadi Party
	Nira Kumari Sah	People's Socialist Party
	Om Prakash Sharma	Nepali Congress
Bara 3(B)	Paras Prasad Sah	People's Socialist Party
Dhanusha 3(B)	Parmeshwor Sah Sudi	Loktantrik Samajbadi Party
Parsa 3(B)	Prahlad Giri Goswami	Loktantrik Samajbadi Party
	Pramila Devi Das	Nepali Congress
	Pashmina Qadri	CPN (Maoist Centre)
	Pramila Kumari Yadav	CPN (Maoist Centre)
Siraha 3(B)	Pramod Kumar Yadav	CPN (Unified Socialist)
	Rabindra Baitha Dhobi	CPN (Unified Socialist)
Parsa 2(A)	Rajeshwor Prasad Sah	Nepali Congress
	Rajini Devi Waranwal	People's Socialist Party
Rautahat 2(B)	Ram Kishore Prasad Yadav	People's Socialist Party
Dhanusha 2(B)	Ram Ashish Yadav	People's Socialist Party
Siraha 3(A)	Ram Kumar Yadav	CPN (Maoist Centre)
	Ram Naresh Rae	People's Socialist Party
Dhanusha 3(A)	Ram Saroj Yadav	Nepali Congress
Parsa 2(B)	Ramesh Prasad Kurmi	Loktantrik Samajbadi Party
Mahottari 3(B)	Rani Kumari Tiwari	Loktantrik Samajbadi Party
	Reena Yadav	People's Socialist Party
	Rubi Kumari Karn	CPN (Maoist Centre)
	Sabitri Devi Shah	Nepal Federal Socialist Party
	Sanchamaya Moktan	People's Socialist Party
Sarlahi 3(B)	Sanjay Kumar Yadav	People's Socialist Party
Bara 2(A)	Sarada Shankar Prasad Kalawar	People's Socialist Party
	Saraswati Chaudhary	Nepali Congress
Mahottari 4(B)	Saroj Kumar Singh	People's Socialist Party
Bara 1(B)	Saroj Kumar Yadav	People's Socialist Party
Saptari 1(A)	Satya Narayan Mandal	CPN (UML)
Dhanusha 2(A)	Shailendra Kumar Yadav	People's Socialist Party
Saptari 2(A)	Shailendra Prasad Sah	People's Socialist Party
Parsa 4(A)	Shankar Prasad Chaudhary	Nepali Congress
Mahottari 1(A)	Sharada Devi Thapa	CPN (UML)
Dhanusha 4(B)	Satrudhan Mahato	CPN (Unified Socialist)
	Sheikh Rasid Ali	Nepali Congress
Parsa 4(B)	Singhasan Sah Kalwar	People's Socialist Party
	Shiv Chandra Chaudhary	Nepali Congress
	Shobha Lama	Nepali Congress
	Shyam Pari Devi	Nepali Congress
	Sita Gurung	CPN (Unified Socialist)
Bara 4(A)	Sundar Bahadur Bishwokarma	CPN (Unified Socialist)
	Sunita Devi Mochi	People's Socialist Party
Siraha 4(B)	Suresh Kumar Mandal	People's Socialist Party
Mahottari 2(B)	Surita Kumari Sah	Loktantrik Samajbadi Party
Bara 1(A)	Triloki Prasad	CPN (UML)
	Upama Kumari Dev	People's Socialist Party
Sarlahi 1(A)	Upendra Mahato	Loktantrik Samajbadi Party
	Usha Kumari	People's Socialist Party
Rautahat 1(B)	Yogendra Rae Yadav	People's Socialist Party

=== Defections ===
Constituency (PR if blank)	Name	Date	From	To
Rautahat 4(B)	Sheikh Abul Kalam Aajad	7 April 2018	Independent	Federal Socialist Forum
Mahottari 3(A)	Abhiram Sharma	25 August 2021	People's Socialist Party	Loktantrik Samajbadi Party
	Alka Kumari Jha	25 August 2021	People's Socialist Party	Loktantrik Samajbadi Party
	Babita Kumari	25 August 2021	People's Socialist Party	Loktantrik Samajbadi Party
Rautahat 1(A)	Babulal Sah Kanu	25 August 2021	People's Socialist Party	Loktantrik Samajbadi Party
	Dimpal Kumari Jha	25 August 2021	People's Socialist Party	Loktantrik Samajbadi Party
Sarlahi 2(A)	Gauri Narayan Sah Teli	25 August 2021	People's Socialist Party	Loktantrik Samajbadi Party
	Janaki Sharan Sah	25 August 2021	People's Socialist Party	Loktantrik Samajbadi Party
Mahottari 2(A)	Jayanul Rain	25 August 2021	People's Socialist Party	Loktantrik Samajbadi Party
Bara 4(B)	Jitendra Prasad Sonal	25 August 2021	People's Socialist Party	Loktantrik Samajbadi Party
	Nilam Devi Bhumiharani	25 August 2021	People's Socialist Party	Loktantrik Samajbadi Party
Dhanusha 3(B)	Parmeshwor Sah Sudi	25 August 2021	People's Socialist Party	Loktantrik Samajbadi Party
Parsa 3(B)	Prahlad Giri Goswami	25 August 2021	People's Socialist Party	Loktantrik Samajbadi Party
Parsa 2(B)	Ramesh Prasad Kurmi	25 August 2021	People's Socialist Party	Loktantrik Samajbadi Party
Mahottari 3(B)	Rani Kumari Tiwari	25 August 2021	People's Socialist Party	Loktantrik Samajbadi Party
Mahottari 2(B)	Surita Kumari Sah	25 August 2021	People's Socialist Party	Loktantrik Samajbadi Party
Sarlahi 1(A)	Upendra Mahato	25 August 2021	People's Socialist Party	Loktantrik Samajbadi Party
Siraha 1(B)	Ashok Kumar Yadav	25 August 2021	CPN (UML)	CPN (Unified Socialist)
Sarlahi 1(B)	Bechi Lungeli	25 August 2021	CPN (UML)	CPN (Unified Socialist)
Sarlahi 3(A)	Dilli Prasad Upreti	25 August 2021	CPN (UML)	CPN (Unified Socialist)
Saptari 4(A)	Govinda Bahadur Neupane	25 August 2021	CPN (UML)	CPN (Unified Socialist)
	Hasima Khatun	25 August 2021	CPN (UML)	CPN (Unified Socialist)
Siraha 2(B)	Madansen Prasad Shreevastav	25 August 2021	CPN (UML)	CPN (Unified Socialist)
	Manju Kumari Yadav	25 August 2021	CPN (UML)	CPN (Unified Socialist)
Rautahat 3(A)	Nagendra Rae Yadav	25 August 2021	CPN (UML)	CPN (Unified Socialist)
Siraha 3(B)	Pramod Kumar Yadav	25 August 2021	CPN (UML)	CPN (Unified Socialist)
	Rabindra Baitha Dhobi	25 August 2021	CPN (UML)	CPN (Unified Socialist)
Dhanusha 4(B)	Satrudhan Mahato	25 August 2021	CPN (UML)	CPN (Unified Socialist)
	Sita Gurung	25 August 2021	CPN (UML)	CPN (Unified Socialist)
Bara 4(A)	Sundar Bahadur Bishwokarma	25 August 2021	CPN (UML)	CPN (Unified Socialist)

=== Changes ===
Constituency/PR group	MPA	Party	Date seat vacated	Cause of vacation	New MPA	Party
Dhanusha 1(B)	Ram Chandra Mandal	CPN (Maoist Centre)	12 April 2021	Expelled by party		
Rautahat 3(B)	Kundan Prasad Kushwaha	CPN (Maoist Centre)	12 April 2021	Expelled by party		
Bara 3(A)	Jwala Kumari Sah	CPN (Maoist Centre)	12 April 2021	Expelled by party		
	Mohammad Samir	CPN (Maoist Centre)	12 April 2021	Expelled by party	Pashmina Qadri	CPN (Maoist Centre)
Rautahat 4(B)	Sheikh Abul Kalam Aajad	People's Socialist Party	22 April 2022	Resignation to contest as mayor of Gadhimai		
Sarlahi 4(B)	Upendra Prasad Kushwaha	Nepali Congress	22 April 2022	Resignation to contest as mayor of Godaita		
	Dimpal Kumari Jha	Loktantrik Samajbadi Party	24 April 2022	Death		

== See also ==
- Madhesh Province
- 2017 Nepalese provincial elections
