= Mahottari 4 =

Parliamentary constituency in Nepal

- Parliamentary constituency
- Mahottari 4 in Province No. 2
- Province: Province No. 2
- District: Mahottari District

Current constituency
- Created: 1991
- Party: Rastriya Swatantra Party
- Member of Parliament: Gauri Kumari

Mahottari 4 is one of four parliamentary constituencies of Mahottari District in Nepal. This constituency came into existence on the Constituency Delimitation Commission (CDC) report submitted on 31 August 2017.

== Incorporated areas ==
Mahottari 4 incorporates Samsi Rural Municipality, Sonama Rural Municipality, Ramgopalpur Municipality, wards 3–6 Aurahi Municipality and wards 1–7 of Manara Shiswa Municipality.

== Assembly segments ==
It encompasses the following Province No. 2 Provincial Assembly segment

- Mahottari 4(A)
- Mahottari 4(B)

== Members of Parliament ==
=== Parliament/Constituent Assembly ===
Election	Member	Party
1991	Beni Madhav Singh	Nepali Congress
1994	Sharat Singh Bhandari	Independent
1995	Sharat Singh Bhandari	Nepali Congress
1999	Mahendra Kumar Ray	Nepali Congress
2008	Ram Kumar Sharma	Terai Madhes Loktantrik Party
2013	Chandeshwar Jha	Independent
2017	Surendra Kumar Yadav	Federal Socialist Forum, Nepal
May 2019	Surendra Kumar Yadav	Samajbadi Party, Nepal
April 2020	Surendra Kumar Yadav	People's Socialist Party, Nepal
2022	Mahendra Kumar Raya	Nepali Congress
2026	Gauri Kumari	Rastriya Swatantra Party

=== Provincial Assembly ===
==== 4(A) ====
Election	Member	Party
2017	Kaushal Kumar Yadav	Federal Socialist Forum, Nepal
May 2019	Kaushal Kumar Yadav	Samajbadi Party, Nepal
April 2020	Kaushal Kumar Yadav	People's Socialist Party, Nepal

==== 4(B) ====
Election	Member	Party
2017	Saroj Kumar Singh	Federal Socialist Forum, Nepal
May 2019	Saroj Kumar Singh	Samajbadi Party, Nepal
April 2020	Saroj Kumar Singh	People's Socialist Party, Nepal

== Election results ==
=== Election in the 2020s ===
==== 2026 general election ====
Candidate	Party	Votes	%
Gauri Kumari	Rastriya Swatantra Party	30,132	57.93
Surendra Kumar Yadav	People's Socialist Party, Nepal	8,742	16.81
Mahendra Kumar Raya	Nepali Congress	6,944	13.35
Neelam Adhikari	CPN-UML	6,192	11.91
Total		52,010	100.00
Majority		21,390	
Rastriya Swatantra Party gain from Nepali Congress			

==== 2022 general election ====
Candidate	Party	Votes	%
Mahendra Kumar Raya	Nepali Congress	25,448	43.25
Surendra Kumar Yadav	People's Socialist Party, Nepal	21,331	36.26
Manoj Kumar Sah	Janamat Party	10,059	17.10
Others		1,995	3.39
Total		58,833	100.00
Majority		4,117	
Nepali Congress gain			

=== Election in the 2010s ===
==== 2017 legislative elections ====
Party	Candidate	Votes
Federal Socialist Forum, Nepal	Surendra Kumar Yadav	18,353
Nepali Congress	Mahendra Kumar Ray	13,025
CPN (Unified Marxist–Leninist)	Mohammad Razi Haider	12,945
Independent	Devendra Kumar Yadav	1,647
Naya Shakti Party, Nepal	Sanjay Kumar Shah	1,093
Others		3,519
Invalid votes		3,947
Result	FSFN gain	
Source: Election Commission

==== 2017 Nepalese provincial elections ====
===== 4(A) =====
Party	Candidate	Votes
Federal Socialist Forum, Nepal	Kaushal Kumar Yadav	9,277
Nepali Congress	Gokhul Ray Yadav	7,393
CPN (Maoist Centre)	Ram Babu Chaudhary	6,626
Others		2,503
Invalid votes		1,446
Result	FSFN gain	
Source: Election Commission

===== 4(B) =====
Party	Candidate	Votes
Federal Socialist Forum, Nepal	Saroj Kumar Singh	7,555
CPN (Unified Marxist-Leninist)	Saroj Kumar Yadav	5,079
Nepali Congress	Diptanshu Pratap Singh	4,567
Independent	Ram Padartha Mandal	2,477
Independent	Raj Kumar Daha	1,615
Independent	Bharat Sahani	1,534
Others		2,652
Invalid votes		1,688
Result	FSFN gain	
Source: Election Commission

==== 2013 Constituent Assembly election ====
Party	Candidate	Votes
Independent	Chandeshwar Jha	3,062
Sadbhavana Party	Surita Kumar Sah	2,927
Terai Madhes Loktantrik Party	Hari Narayan Mandal	2,765
Nepali Congress	Lalam Kumar Ray	2,760
CPN (Unified Marxist–Leninist)	Iliyas Ansari	2,758
UCPN (Maoist)	Indu Kumari Sharma	2,757
Sanghiya Sadbhvana Party	Sunil Kumar Jha	2,312
Terai Madhesh Sadbhavana Party	Saroj Kumar Singh	1,861
Rastriya Madhesh Samajwadi Party	Lalal Kumar Singh	1,546
Madhesh Samata Party Nepal	Ram Bishesh Sharan	1,365
Nepal Yuwa Kisan Party	Birju Mahato Nuniya	1,285
Rastriya Prajatantra Party	Ram Daresh Ray	1,085
Others		3,595
Result	Independent gain	
Source: NepalNews

=== Election in the 2000s ===
==== 2008 Constituent Assembly election ====
Party	Candidate	Votes
Terai Madhes Loktantrik Party	Ram Kumar Sharma	9,564
CPN (Maoist)	Rajendra Shah	7,228
CPN (Unified Marxist–Leninist)	Jamun Mandal	5,392
Rastriya Prajatantra Party	Ram Vilas Yadav	4,921
Nepali Congress	Surendra Prasad Singh Rajput	4,238
Madheshi Janaadhikar Forum, Nepal	Sita Nanda Raya	3,169
Others		4,199
Invalid votes		2,803
Result	TMLP gain	
Source: Election Commission

=== Election in the 1990s ===
==== 1999 legislative elections ====
Party	Candidate	Votes
Nepali Congress	Mahendra Kumar Ray	19,647
Rastriya Prajatantra Party	Ram Vilas Yadav	11,177
Samyukta Janamorcha Nepal	Parmananda Chaudhary Kalwar	10,201
Nepal Sadbhawana Party	Ram Chhabila Ray	4,261
Rastriya Prajatantra Party (Chand)	Ram Babu Singh	1,597
CPN (Marxist–Leninist)	Surendra Raj Singh Shrestha	1,526
Others		1,013
Invalid Votes		2,441
Result	Congress hold	
Source: Election Commission

==== 1994 legislative elections ====
Party	Candidate	Votes
Independent	Sharat Singh Bhandari	11,395
Nepali Congress	Basanta Kumar Gurung	10,585
Independent	Sita Ram Bhandari	6,531
Nepal Sadbhawana Party	Bharat Bimal Singh	5,003
Rastriya Prajatantra Party	Mishri Giri	3,472
CPN (Unified Marxist–Leninist)	Ram Pratap Mahato	3,413
Samyukta Janamorcha Nepal	Dip Bahadur Yonjan	2,558
Others		597
Result	Independent gain	
Source: Election Commission

==== 1991 legislative elections ====
Party	Candidate	Votes
Nepali Congress	Beni Madhav Singh	11,605
Rastriya Prajatantra Party (Thapa)	Ram Bilas Yadav	5,441
Result	Congress gain	

== See also ==
- List of parliamentary constituencies of Nepal
