= Manoj Yadav =

Manoj Yadav is an Indian name and can refer to:

- Manoj Yadav (politician)
- Manoj Kumar Yadav (Bihar politician)
- Manoj Kumar Yadav (Jharkhand politician)

== See also ==
- Manoj Yadava, Indian police officer
- Manoj (disambiguation)
- Yadav (disambiguation)
- Manoj Kumar (disambiguation)
