= Manju Kumari Yadav =

Manju Kumari Yadav may refer to:

- Manju Kumari Yadav (Sonama Rural Municipality), Nepalese politician from Sonama Rural Municipality
- Manju Kumari Yadav (Bhangaha), Nepalese politician from Bhangaha
