= Rubi Kumari Karn =

Nepalese politician

Honourable Rubi Kumari Karn
- रुवी कुमारी कर्ण
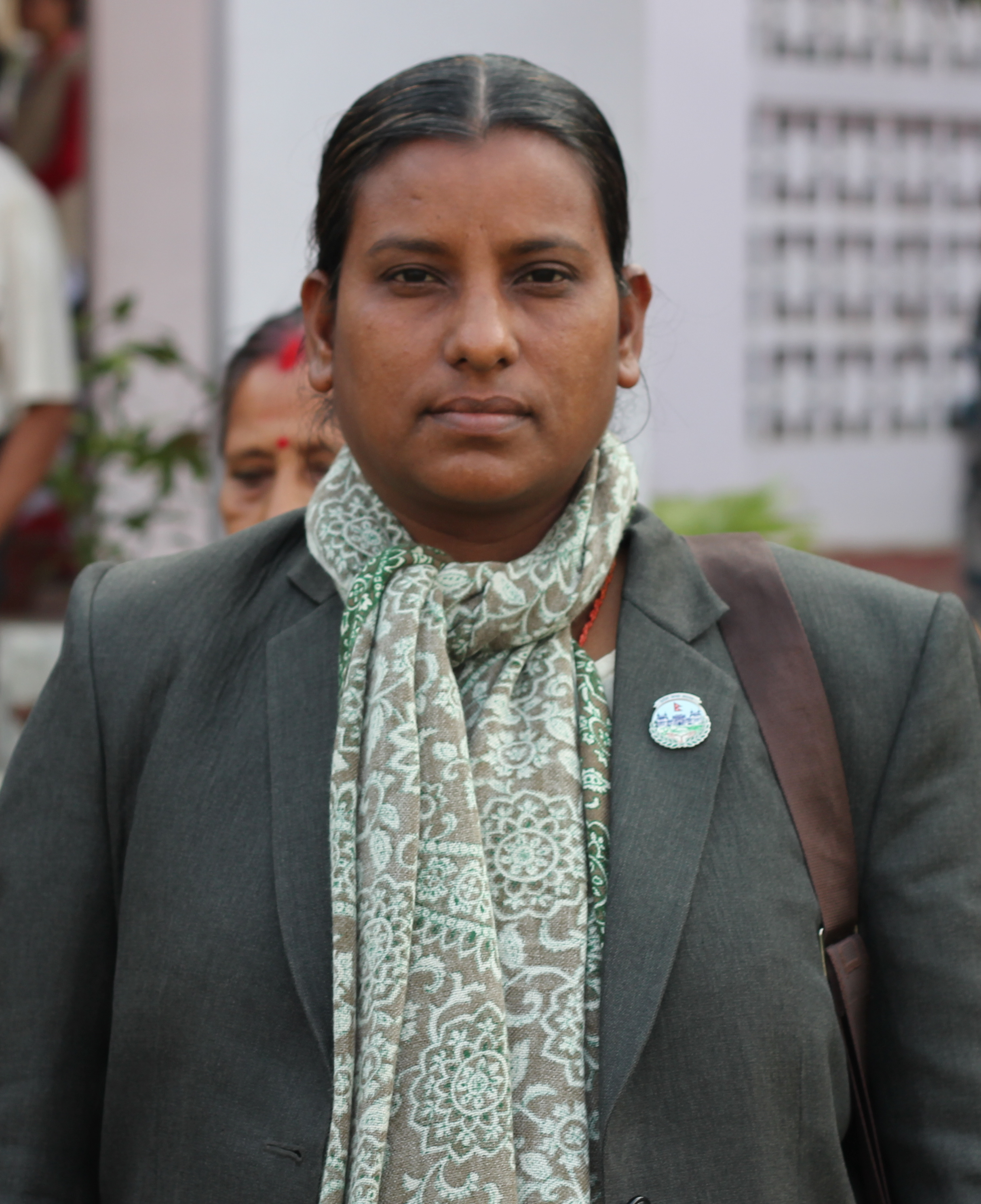
- Portrait of Karn in 2019

State Minister for Internal Affairs and Law of Madhesh Province
- In office 1 March 2018 – 12 January 2023 Serving with Saroj Kumar Singh
- Minister: Bharat Prasad Sah
- Governor: Ratneshwar Lal Kayastha; Tilak Pariyar; Rajesh Jha; Hari Shankar Mishra
- Chief minister: Lalbabu Raut
- Preceded by: Assembly created

Province Assembly Member of Madhesh Province
- In office 2017 – September 2022
- Preceded by: Assembly created
- Constituency: Proportional representation

Personal details
- Party: CPN (Maoist Centre)
- Occupation: Politician

Rubi Kumari Karn (Nepali: रुवी कुमारी कर्ण) is a Nepalese politician. She was elected member through the party list proportional representation system of Provincial Assembly of Madhesh Province from CPN (Maoist Centre) in 2017. Karn is a resident of Khadak, Saptari.
