= Sarlahi 1 =

Parliamentary constituency in Madhesh Province, Nepal

- Parliamentary constituency
- Sarlahi 1 in Madhesh Province
- Province: Madhesh Province
- District: Sarlahi District
- Electorate: 130,871
- Major settlements: Lalbandi; Hariwan; Haripur

Current constituency
- Created: 1991
- Party: Rastriya Swatantra Party
- Member of Parliament: Nitima Bhandari (Karki)
- Local levels: Lalbandi Municipality; Chandranagar Rural Municipality; Ishwarpur Municipality (wards 1–14); Kabilasi Municipality (wards 1, 2, and 7); Haripur Municipality (wards 2–9)

Sarlahi 1 is one of four parliamentary constituencies of Sarlahi District in Nepal. This constituency came into existence on the Constituency Delimitation Commission (CDC) report submitted on 31 August 2017.

== Incorporated areas ==
Sarlahi 1 incorporates Lalbandi Municipality, Chandranagar Rural Municipality, wards 1–14 of Ishwarpur Municipality, wards 1,2 and 7 of Kabilasi Municipality, and wards 2–9 of Haripur Municipality.

== Assembly segments ==
It encompasses the following Province No. 2 Provincial Assembly segment

- Sarlahi 1(A)
- Sarlahi 1(B)

== Members of Parliament ==
=== Parliament/Constituent Assembly ===
| Election | Member | Party |
|---|---|---|
| 1991 | Bramha Narayan Chaudhary | Nepali Congress |
| 1994 | Mahendra Raya Yadav | CPN (Unified Marxist–Leninist) |
| 2008 | Prakash Pakhrin | CPN (Unified Marxist–Leninist) |
| 2013 | Shambhu Lal Shrestha | UCPN (Maoist) |
| April 2016 | Shambhu Lal Shrestha | CPN (Maoist Centre) |
| 2017 | Pramod Sah | Rastriya Janata Party Nepal |
| April 2020 | Pramod Sah | People's Socialist Party, Nepal |
| 2022 | Ram Prakash Chaudhary | Loktantrik Samajwadi Party |
| 2026 | Nitima Bhandari (Karki) | Rastriya Swatantra Party |

=== Provincial Assembly ===
==== 1(A) ====
| Election | Member | Party |
|---|---|---|
| 2017 | Upendra Mahato | Rastriya Janata Party Nepal |
| April 2020 | Upendra Mahato | People's Socialist Party, Nepal |
| August 2021 | Upendra Mahato | Loktantrik Samajwadi Party, Nepal |

==== 1(B) ====
| Election | Member | Party |
|---|---|---|
| 2017 | Bechi Lungeli | CPN (Unified Marxist-Leninist) |
| May 2018 | Bechi Lungeli | Nepal Communist Party |
| March 2021 | Bechi Lungeli | CPN (Unified Marxist–Leninist) |
| August 2021 | Bechi Lungeli | CPN (Unified Socialist) |

== Election results ==
=== Election in the 2020s ===
==== 2026 general election ====
| Candidate | Party | Votes | % |
|---|---|---|---|
| Nitima Bhandari (Karki) | Rastriya Swatantra Party | 44,181 | 59.83 |
| Shambhu Lal Shrestha | Nepali Congress | 7,871 | 10.66 |
| Manoj Kumar Devkota | CPN (UML) | 6,101 | 8.26 |
| Pramod Sah | Nepali Communist Party | 5,498 | 7.45 |
| Ram Prakash Chaudhary | Janata Samajbadi Party, Nepal | 3,991 | 5.40 |
| Chhatra Bahadur Dumjan | Ujyaalo Nepal Party | 1,913 | 2.59 |
| Shrinjay Mahato | Janamat Party | 848 | 1.15 |
| Raja Ram Paswan | Nepal Federal Socialist Party | 624 | 0.85 |
| Surya Narayan Raya Yadav | Rastriya Prajatantra Party | 601 | 0.81 |
| Suman Hari Adhikari | Shram Sanskriti Party | 580 | 0.79 |
| Rewat Kumar Adhikari | Independent | 359 | 0.49 |
| Others | | 1,275 | 1.73 |
| Total | | 73,842 | 100.00 |
| Valid votes | | 73,842 | 93.23 |
| Invalid/blank votes | | 5,365 | 6.77 |
| Total votes | | 79,207 | 100.00 |
| Registered voters/turnout | | 130,871 | 60.52 |
| Majority | | 36,310 | |
| Rastriya Swatantra Party gain | | | |

==== 2022 general election ====
| Candidate | Party | Votes | % |
|---|---|---|---|
| Ram Prakash Chaudhary | Loktantrik Samajwadi Party, Nepal | 24,838 | 34.80 |
| Man Bahadur Khadka | Independent | 18,404 | 25.79 |
| Pramod Sah | People's Socialist Party, Nepal | 14,255 | 19.97 |
| Ram Biswas Rae | Janamat Party | 4,096 | 5.74 |
| Ram Dular Mahato | Rastriya Swatantra Party | 3,253 | 4.56 |
| Rajendra Prasad Mainali | Rastriya Prajatantra Party | 2,229 | 3.12 |
| Dhwaj Man Muktan | Independent | 1,722 | 2.41 |
| Others | | 2,577 | 3.61 |
| Total | | 71,374 | 100.00 |
| Majority | | 6,434 | |
| Loktantrik Samajwadi Party, Nepal gain | | | |

=== Election in the 2010s ===
==== 2017 legislative elections ====
| Party | Candidate | Votes |
|---|---|---|
| Rastriya Janata Party Nepal | Pramod Sah | 22,036 |
| CPN (Unified Marxist–Leninist) | Dhruba Prasad Gautam | 21,465 |
| Nepali Congress | Shambhu Lal Shrestha | 20,075 |
| Others | | 1,636 |
| Invalid votes | | 3,417 |
| Result | RJPN gain | |
Source: Election Commission

==== 2017 Nepalese provincial elections ====
===== 1(A) =====
| Party | Candidate | Votes |
|---|---|---|
| Rastriya Janata Party Nepal | Upendra Mahato | 12,603 |
| CPN (Maoist Centre) | Ram Chandra Singh Kushwaha | 8,893 |
| Nepali Congress | Manoj Kumar Singh | 6,479 |
| Independent | Santosh Kumar Thapa | 2,249 |
| Others | | 1,215 |
| Invalid votes | | 1,489 |
| Result | RJPN gain | |
Source: Election Commission

===== 1(B) =====
| Party | Candidate | Votes |
|---|---|---|
| CPN (Unified Marxist–Leninist) | Bechi Lungeli | 15,363 |
| Nepali Congress | Sheikh Sah Dullah | 9,197 |
| Rastriya Janata Party Nepal | Ram Prasad Chaudhary | 8,808 |
| Others | | 880 |
| Invalid votes | | 1,312 |
| Result | CPN (UML) gain | |
Source: Election Commission

==== 2013 Constituent Assembly election ====
| Party | Candidate | Votes |
|---|---|---|
| UCPN (Maoist) | Shambhu Lal Shrestha | 9,476 |
| CPN (Unified Marxist–Leninist) | Jhala Nath Khanal | 8,791 |
| Terai Madhesh Sadbhavna Party | Chandra Singh Kushwaha | 4,588 |
| Nepali Congress | Sushila Karki | 3,896 |
| Rastriya Prajatantra Party Nepal | Narayan Shrestha | 2,729 |
| Terai Madhesh Loktantrik Party | Gopal Panjiyar | 2,050 |
| Sadbhavana Party | Rup Narayan Singh Danuwar | 1,614 |
| Madhesi Jana Adhikar Forum, Nepal (Democratic) | Shiva Kumar Gurmachhane | 1,399 |
| Rastriya Madhesh Samajbadi Party | Jagat Narayan Shrestha | 1,107 |
| Others | | 2,466 |
| Result | Maoist gain | |
Source: NepalNews

=== Election in the 2000s ===
==== 2008 Constituent Assembly election ====
| Party | Candidate | Votes |
|---|---|---|
| CPN (Unified Marxist–Leninist) | Prakash Pakhrin | 12,726 |
| CPN (Maoist) | Lumadi Prasad Dhimal | 10,337 |
| Terai Madhesh Loktantrik Party | Ram Chandra Singh Kushwaha | 7,223 |
| Nepali Congress | Sushila Karki | 7,087 |
| Rastriya Prajatantra Party Nepal | Ram Dayal Chaudhary | 2,523 |
| Sadbhavana Party | Ahmed Miya Mukeli | 2,220 |
| Chure Bhawar Rastriya Ekta Party Nepal | Arjun Kumar Chaudhary | 1,699 |
| Others | | 3,473 |
| Invalid votes | | 3,864 |
| Result | CPN (UML) gain | |
Source: Election Commission

=== Election in the 1990s ===
==== 1999 legislative elections ====
| Party | Candidate | Votes |
|---|---|---|
| CPN (Unified Marxist–Leninist) | Mahendra Raya Yadav | 23,444 |
| Nepali Congress | Ramasis Sah Teli | 19,126 |
| Samyukta Janamorcha Nepal | Pralhad Kumar Budhathoki | 1,746 |
| Nepal Sadbhawana Party | Asarfi Chaudhary | 1,653 |
| CPN (Marxist–Leninist) | Indra Bahadur Khadka | 1,450 |
| Rastriya Prajatantra Party | Tulsi Raj Ghimire | 1,065 |
| Others | | 1,856 |
| Invalid Votes | | 1,795 |
| Result | CPN (UML) hold | |
Source: Election Commission

==== 1994 legislative elections ====
| Party | Candidate | Votes |
|---|---|---|
| CPN (Unified Marxist–Leninist) | Mahendra Raya Yadav | 23,758 |
| Nepali Congress | Bramha Narayan Chaudhary | 13,553 |
| Rastriya Prajatantra Party | Ammar Bahadur Thapa | 3,393 |
| Nepal Sadbhawana Party | Anup Raya Yadav | 1,875 |
| Others | | 421 |
| Result | CPN (UML) gain | |
Source: Election Commission

==== 1991 legislative elections ====
| Party | Candidate | Votes |
|---|---|---|
| Nepali Congress | Bramha Narayan Chaudhary | 12,296 |
| CPN (Unified Marxist–Leninist) | Kedar Neupane | 6,784 |
| Result | Congress gain | |

== See also ==
- List of parliamentary constituencies of Nepal
- Sarlahi 2 (constituency)
- Sarlahi 3 (constituency)
- Sarlahi 4 (constituency)
