= Chameli Devi Das =

Nepalese politician

- चमेली देवी दास

Province Assembly Member of Madhesh Province
- In office 2017–2022
- Preceded by: N/A
- Constituency: Proportional list

Personal details
- Born: July 7, 1977 (age 48)
- Party: People's Socialist Party, Nepal
- Occupation: Politician

Chameli Devi Das (Nepali: चमेली देवी दास) is a Nepalese politician. She is a former member of the Provincial Assembly of Madhesh Province from People's Socialist Party, Nepal. Das is a resident of Lakshminiya Rural Municipality, Dhanusha.
