= Ram Kumar Yadav =

Ram Kumar Yadav may refer to:

- Ram Kumar Yadav (Nepalese politician)
- Ram Kumar Yadav (Indian politician)
