= Parmeshwor Sah Sudi =

Nepalese politician

Honourable Parmeshwor Sah Sudi
- परमेश्वर साह सुडी
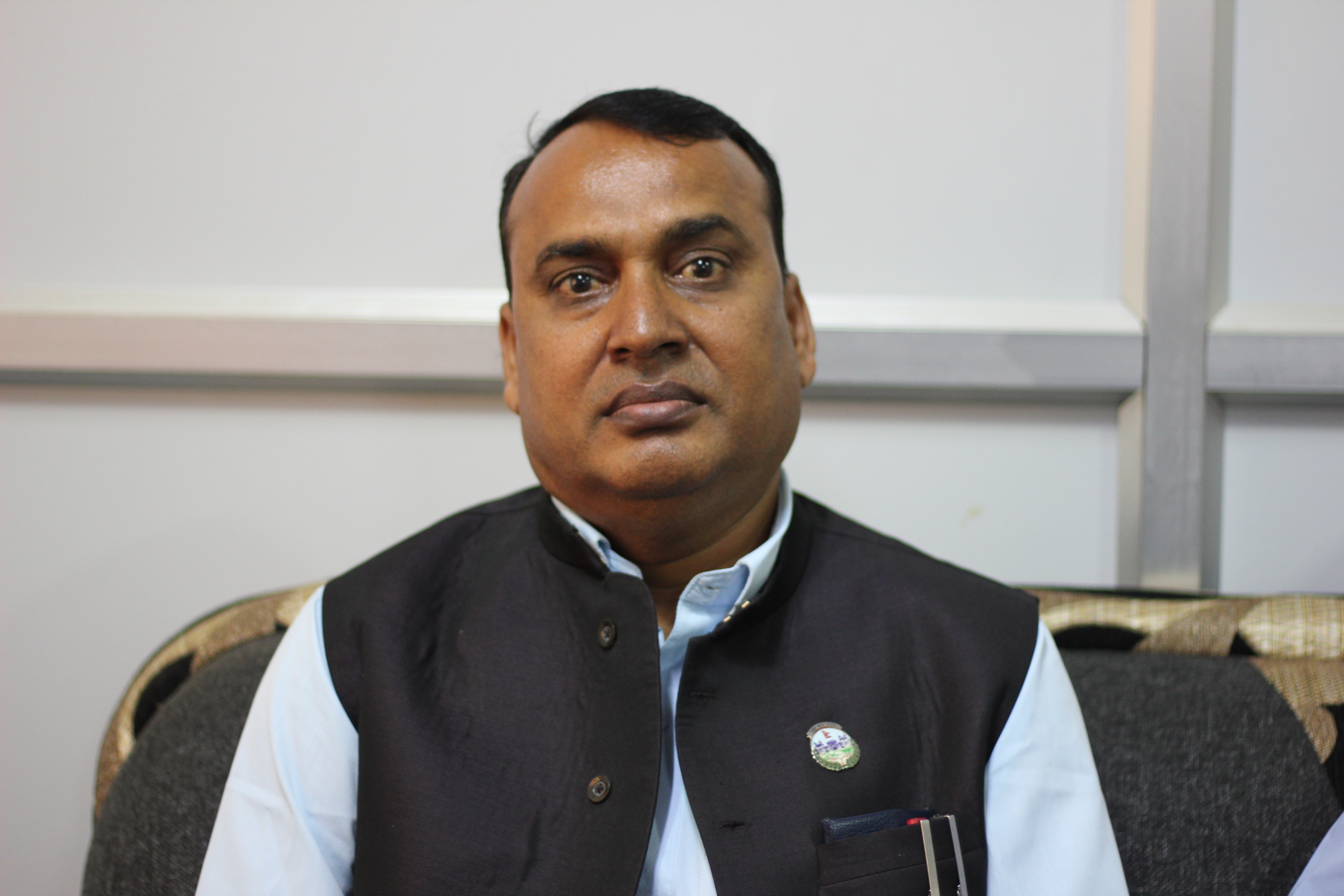
- Portrait of Sah in 2019

Province Assembly Member of Madhesh Province
- Incumbent
- Assumed office 2017
- Preceded by: N/A
- Constituency: Siraha 3 (A)

Personal details
- Party: Loktantrik Samajbadi Party, Nepal
- Occupation: Politician

Parmeshwor Sah Sudi (or Parmeshwar Sah Sudi; Nepali: परमेश्वर साह सुडी) is a Nepalese politician who is elected member of Provincial Assembly of Madhesh Province from Loktantrik Samajbadi Party, Nepal. Shah, a resident of Janakpur was elected in the 2017 Nepalese provincial elections, from Dhanusha 3(B).

== Electoral history ==
=== 2017 Nepalese provincial elections ===
Party	Candidate	Votes
Rastriya Janata Party Nepal	Parmeshwor Sah Sudi	15,293
Nepali Congress	Shyam Prasad Sah	10,472
Communist Party of Nepal (Maoist Centre)	Kameshwar Prasad Mahato	1,070
Others		598
Invalid votes		899
Result	RJPN gain	
Source: Election Commission
