= Ram Prakash Chaudhary (Nepalese politician) =

Nepalese politician

Honourable Ram Prakash Chaudhary

Member of the House of Representatives
- In office 26 December 2022 – 12 September 2025
- Preceded by: Pramod Sah
- Succeeded by: Nitima Bhandari
- Constituency: Sarlahi 1

Personal details
- Party: Loktantrik Samajwadi Party

Ram Prakash Chaudhary is a Nepalese politician, belonging to the Loktantrik Samajwadi Party, who served as a member of the 2nd Federal Parliament of Nepal. In the 2022 Nepalese general election, he won the election from the Sarlahi 1 constituency.
