= Gauri Kumari Yadav =

Nepalese politician

- गौरीकुमारी यादव
- Official Portrait, 2026

Minister of Industry, Commerce and Supplies
- In office 10 April 2026 – 10 September 2026
- President: Ram Chandra Paudel
- Prime Minister: Balendra Shah
- Preceded by: Anil Kumar Sinha

Member of Parliament, Pratinidhi Sabha
- Incumbent
- Assumed office 26 March 2026
- Preceded by: Mahendra Kumar Raya
- Constituency: Mahottari 4

Personal details
- Born: 19 January 1972 (age 54) Samsi, Nepal
- Party: Rastriya Swatantra
- Spouse: Shivajee Yadav
- Parents: Ram Ekwal Ray Yadav (father); Sundar Devi (mother)
- Occupation: Politician

Gauri Kumari Yadav (Note: Nepali: गौरीकुमारी यादव) (born 19 January 1972) is a Nepalese politician who served as the Minister of Industry, Commerce and Supplies from 10 April 2026 until her resignation on 10 September 2026. She is a member of parliament Pratinidhi Sabha from Rastriya Swatantra Party. She joined the active politics from Rastriya Swatantra Party in 2026 and secured a party ticket to contest 2026 general election from Mahottari 4.

In the 2026 general election, she won from Mahottari 4 and secured 30,132 votes, defeating Mahendra Kumar Raya, sitting MP of the Nepali Congress, and Surendra Kumar Yadav, former MP of People's Socialist Party, Nepal. She is also one of the 14 elected women candidates to the Pratinidhi Sabha in the 2026 general election, under the FPTP electoral system.

== Early life and education ==
Gauri Kumari was born in Nepal's Samsiin Mahottari District. She has completed her I.Sc. degree in science.

== Electoral performance ==
In the 2026 Nepalese general election, Gauri Kumari secured a landmark victory in the Mahottari 4 constituency, representing the Rastriya Swatantra Party (RSP). She won the seat with a total of 30,132 votes, accounting for approximately 50.59% of the total vote share. Her performance was particularly notable for unseating prominent established politicians, including the sitting Member of Parliament Mahendra Kumar Raya of the Nepali Congress and former MP Surendra Kumar Yadav of the People's Socialist Party, Nepal.

Gauri Kumari's election was a significant milestone in Nepal's parliamentary history, as she was one of only 14 women elected to the House of Representatives (Pratinidhi Sabha) under the First-past-the-post (FPTP) electoral system during that cycle. Her success mirrored the broader surge of the RSP, which dominated the women’s wins by accounting for 13 of those 14 female candidates, signaling a major shift in the country's political landscape.

Election	Year	Constituency	Contested for	Political party	Result	Votes	% of votes
Nepal general election	2026	Mahottari 4	Pratinidhi Sabha member	Rastriya Swatantra Party	Won	30,132	50.59%

== Ministerial tenure and initiatives ==
During her tenure as Minister of Industry, Commerce and Supplies, Gauri Kumari Yadav pursued many significant initiatives concerning recovery of outstanding arrears from industries, industrial revival, domestic production, consumer protection, easing LPG supply and the management of essential-goods supplies.

=== Recovery of Outstanding Arrears ===
Under Gauri Kumari Yadav's tenure, a cumulative amount of arrears recovered from the industrial zone to date reached 51 crores 61 lakhs 61 thousand rupees (NPR).

=== Industrial revival ===
One of Yadav's principal initiatives was the revival of the Hetauda Textile Industry, a state-owned enterprise that had remained closed for more than two decades. In May 2026, Yadav inspected the facility and stated that the government was preparing resources and a plan for its sustainable revival. In July, the government included the revival of the factory in its industrial action plan, with the Nepal Army undertaking feasibility and preparatory work and repairs to existing machinery.

Trial production subsequently began in August 2026. Yadav visited the factory during the trial phase and stated that the government intended to move beyond trial production toward continuous operation. The revival programme was presented by the government as part of efforts to promote domestic production, employment generation and industrial activity.

Yadav also identified other inactive state-owned enterprises for assessment and potential revival. The ministry reported that the assets and liabilities of several sick state-run industries were being assessed as part of the government's broader industrial-revival programme.

=== Opening of a sales outlet at Singha Durbar ===
Minister Yadav inaugurating and inspecting the Sales Outlet inside Singha Durbar

In August 2026, as Minister for Industry, Commerce and Supplies, Gauri Kumari Yadav inaugurated a sales outlet operated by Food Management and Trading Company Limited near the ministry premises at Singha Durbar, Kathmandu. The outlet was established to make essential food items and daily necessities available at affordable prices to government employees and members of the public visiting the complex.

=== Consumer protection and market monitoring ===
Yadav's tenure also included efforts to strengthen market monitoring amid concerns over the prices and availability of essential goods. The ministry increased attention to market inspections and the monitoring of supply conditions, particularly during periods of shortages.

=== Digitalization of industrial and company registration services ===
During her tenure as Minister for Industry, Commerce and Supplies, Gauri Kumari Yadav directed the digitalisation of administrative services at the Department of Industry and the Office of the Company Registrar as part of efforts to improve public service delivery. In July 2026, the Department of Industry shifted most of its administrative and regulatory services to an online system, including industrial registration and renewal, updates to industrial records, changes to company names and objectives, foreign investment approvals, and business visa recommendations. The new arrangements reduced the need for applicants to visit the department in person and required covered applications and supporting documents to be submitted electronically.

Yadav also supported reforms at the Office of the Company Registrar, where company registration procedures were moved to a fully digital platform. The system was integrated with the Inland Revenue Office to facilitate the automatic generation of Permanent Account Numbers (PAN) following company registration. The office also introduced an artificial intelligence-assisted call centre to respond to service users' questions and complaints.

In June 2026, the Ministry of Industry, Commerce and Supplies launched a public information dashboard integrating data from the Department of Industry, the Department of Commerce, Supply and Consumer Protection, and the Office of the Company Registrar. The dashboard was designed to provide regularly updated information on company, industry and firm registrations, improving public access to administrative data. The initiative was presented as a measure to strengthen transparency and make information about registration and service delivery more accessible to the public.

=== Digital Information Dashboard ===
During Gauri Kumari Yadav's tenure as Minister for Industry, Commerce and Supplies, the Ministry launched a digital public information dashboard on 29 June 2026 to improve transparency and public access to information about business and industrial registrations in Nepal.

The dashboard integrated data from the Department of Industry, the Department of Commerce, Supplies and Consumer Protection, and the Office of the Company Registrar through application programming interfaces (APIs). It was designed to provide regularly updated information on registered companies, industries and business firms through a single digital platform. For government offices without dedicated information technology systems, the platform also incorporated dynamic forms to facilitate data collection.

The initiative aimed to reduce information barriers between government agencies and the public by making registration data more accessible and easier to monitor. By consolidating information from multiple offices, the dashboard was intended to strengthen administrative transparency, support public oversight and facilitate more efficient access to government information. The ministry also indicated plans to expand the platform to incorporate province-level registration data in a subsequent fiscal year.

=== Trade facilitation and investment promotion ===
Yadav also engaged in bilateral discussions concerning trade and investment. In July 2026, she met the United States chargé d'affaires in Nepal to discuss bilateral trade, investment promotion and economic cooperation. She called for renewed market-access arrangements for Nepali goods and greater use of the Trade and Investment Framework Agreement between Nepal and the United States.

During the same period, the Ministry of Industry, Commerce and Supplies held discussions with a United Arab Emirates delegation concerning investment and economic cooperation. Areas discussed included potential investment in railway infrastructure and data centres, as well as technical assistance for certification and the export of Nepali agricultural products to Gulf markets.

=== Policy and administrative reforms ===
The ministry's 100-day programme included amendments to laws and regulations, industrial policy reform, trade facilitation, consumer protection and improvements to industry administration. In June 2026, the ministry reported completion of 32 assigned activities under the government's 100-day governance reform action plan, covering policy reform, industrial development, service delivery, investment promotion and industry administration.

Yadav also participated in parliamentary consideration of legislation concerning the mining sector. In August 2026, she presented the Mines and Minerals Bill for consideration in the House of Representatives of Nepal.
