= Manoj Kumar Singh =

Manoj Kumar Singh may refer to:

- Manoj Kumar Singh (Indian politician)
- Manoj Kumar Singh (Nepalese politician)
- Manoj Kumar Singh (civil servant), India

== See also ==
- Manoj Kumar (disambiguation)
