= Surendra Kumar Yadav (politician) =

Nepali politician

Dr.Surendra Kumar Yadav
- सुरेन्द्र कुमार यादव

Member of Parliament, Pratinidhi Sabha
- In office 4 March 2018 – 2022
- Preceded by: Chandeshwor Jha
- Succeeded by: Mahendra Kumar Raya
- Constituency: Mahottari 4

Personal details
- Born: 3 April 1971 (age 55)
- Party: People's Socialist Party
- Other political affiliations: Naya Shakti; Federal Socialist Forum

Surendra Kumar Yadav is a Nepalese politician, belonging to the People's Socialist Party, Nepal, and a former member of the 1st Federal Parliament of Nepal. In the 2017 Nepalese general election he was elected from the Mahottari 4 constituency, securing 18353 (36.28%) votes.
