= Pramod Kumar Yadav =

Pramod Kumar Yadav may be:

- Pramod Kumar Yadav (Nepali politician)
- Pramod Kumar Yadav (Siraha politician)
