= Nitima Bhandari =

Nepalese politician

Honourable Nitima Bhandari
- नीतिमा भण्डारी

Member of the House of Representatives
- Incumbent
- Assumed office 26 March 2026
- Preceded by: Ram Prakash Chaudhary
- Constituency: Sarlahi 1

Personal details
- Born: 17 July 1982 (age 44) Sinamangal, Kathmandu District, Nepal
- Party: Rastriya Swatantra Party
- Spouse: Chetan Bhandari
- Parent: Laxman Karki (father)
- Occupation: Politician

Nitima Bhandari Karki (Note: Nepali: नीतिमा भण्डारी कार्की) (born 17 July 1982) is a Nepalese politician, entrepreneur and currently a member of Pratinidhi Sabha from Rastriya Swatantra Party. She joined active politics from the Rastriya Swatantra Party in 2026 and secured a party ticket to contest 2026 general election from Sarlahi 1.

In the 2026 general election, she won from Sarlahi 1 with 44,181 votes, defeating Sambhu Lal Shrestha, former minister of the Nepali Congress, and Ram Prakash Chaudhary, seating MP of People's Socialist Party, Nepal.She is also one of the 14 elected women candidates to the Pratinidhi Sabha in the 2026 general election, under the FPTP electoral system.

== Early life and education ==
Nitima was born in Sinamangal, Kathmandu District on 17 July 1982 in a Chhetri family.She has completed her undergraduate degree and is running a business named Bajeko Sekuwa in Kathmandu.

== Electoral performance ==
Election	Year	Constituency	Contested for	Political party	Result	Votes	% of votes
Nepal general election	2026	Sarlahi 1	Pratinidhi Sabha member	Rastriya Swatantra Party	Won	44,181	59.83%
