= Anita Kumari Yadav =

Nepalese politician

Honourable Anita Kumari Yadav
- अनिता कुमारी यादव

Province Assembly Member of Madhesh Province
- Incumbent
- Assumed office 2017
- Preceded by: N/A
- Constituency: Proportional list

Personal details
- Born: August 13, 1966 (age 59)
- Party: CPN (UML)
- Occupation: Politician

Anita Kumari Yadav (Nepali: अनिता कुमारी यादव) is a Nepalese politician. She is a member of Provincial Assembly of Madhesh Province from CPN (Unified Marxist–Leninist). Kumari is a resident of Lakshminiya Rural Municipality.
