= Kiran Kumari Rae =

Nepalese politician

- किरण कुमारी राय

Province Assembly Member of Madhesh Province
- In office 2017–2022
- Preceded by: N/A
- Constituency: Proportional list

Personal details
- Born: October 1, 1978 (age 47)
- Party: People's Socialist Party, Nepal
- Occupation: Politician

Kiran Kumari Rae (Nepali: किरण कुमारी राय) is a Nepalese politician. She is a former member of Provincial Assembly of Madhesh Province from People's Socialist Party, Nepal. Rae is a resident of Ekdara Rural Municipality, Mahottari.
