= Jagat Prasad Yadav =

Nepalese politician

Honourable Jagat Prasad Yadav
- जगत प्रसाद यादव

Province Assembly Member of Madhesh Province
- Incumbent
- Assumed office 2017
- Preceded by: N/A
- Constituency: Proportional list

Personal details
- Born: August 31, 1977 (age 48)
- Party: CPN (Maoist Centre)
- Occupation: Politician

Jagat Prasad Yadav (Nepali: जगत प्रसाद यादव) is a Nepalese politician. He is a member of Provincial Assembly of Madhesh Province from CPN (Maoist Centre). Yadav is a resident of Golbazar, Siraha. He is one of great personality of madhesh Pradesh .

He was also National level athlete of nepal in 100m race and long jump.
