= Saraswati Chaudhary =

Nepali politician

- सरस्वती चौधरी
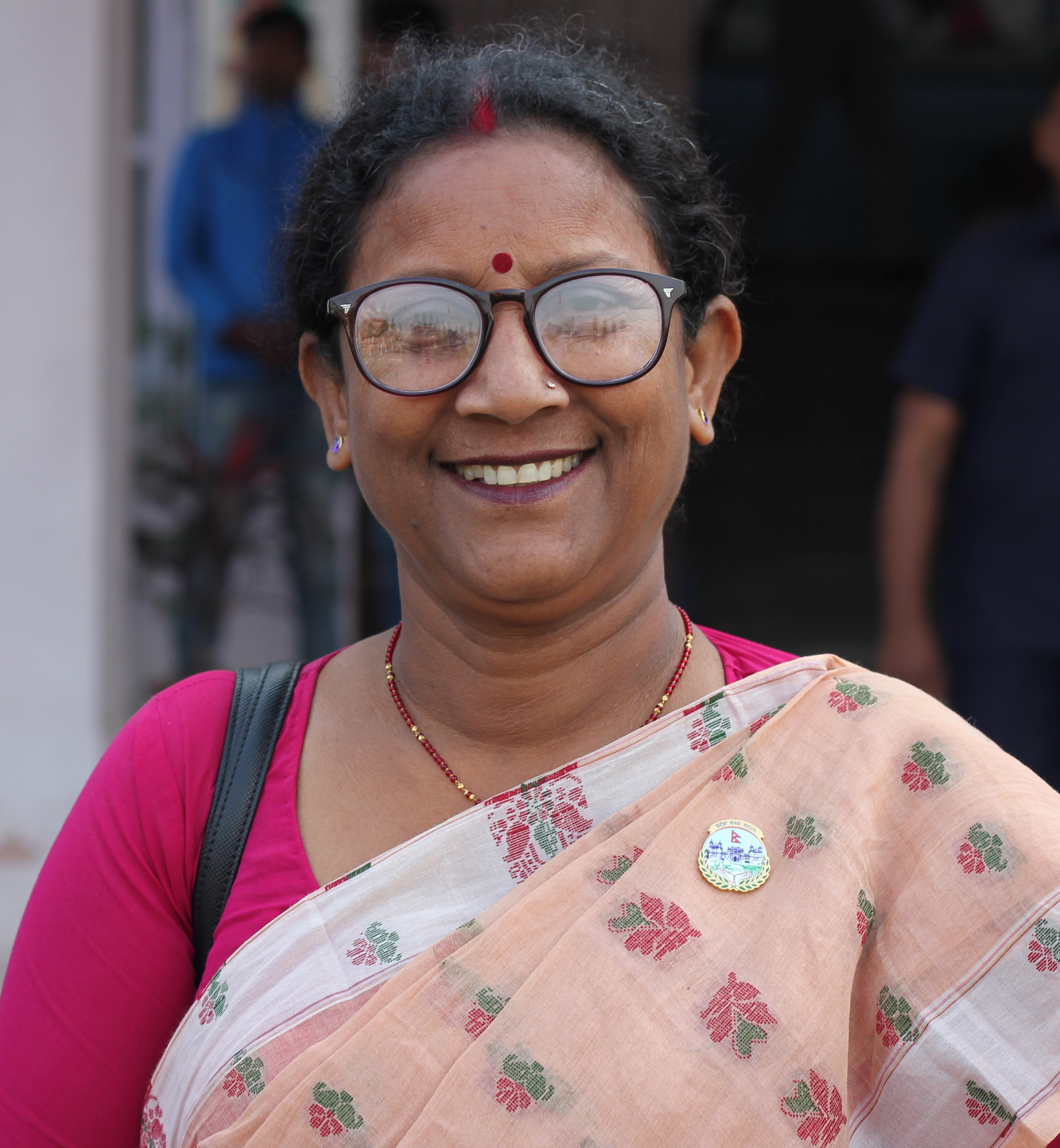
- Portrait of Chaudhary in 2019

Personal details
- Party: Nepali Congress
- Children: 4
- Occupation: Politician

Saraswati Chaudhary (Nepali: सरस्वती चौधरी) is a Nepali politician in the Nepali Congress. She is a member of the Province No. 2 Provincial Assembly.
