= Netra Bikram Shah =

Nepalese politician

- नेत्र विक्रम शाह
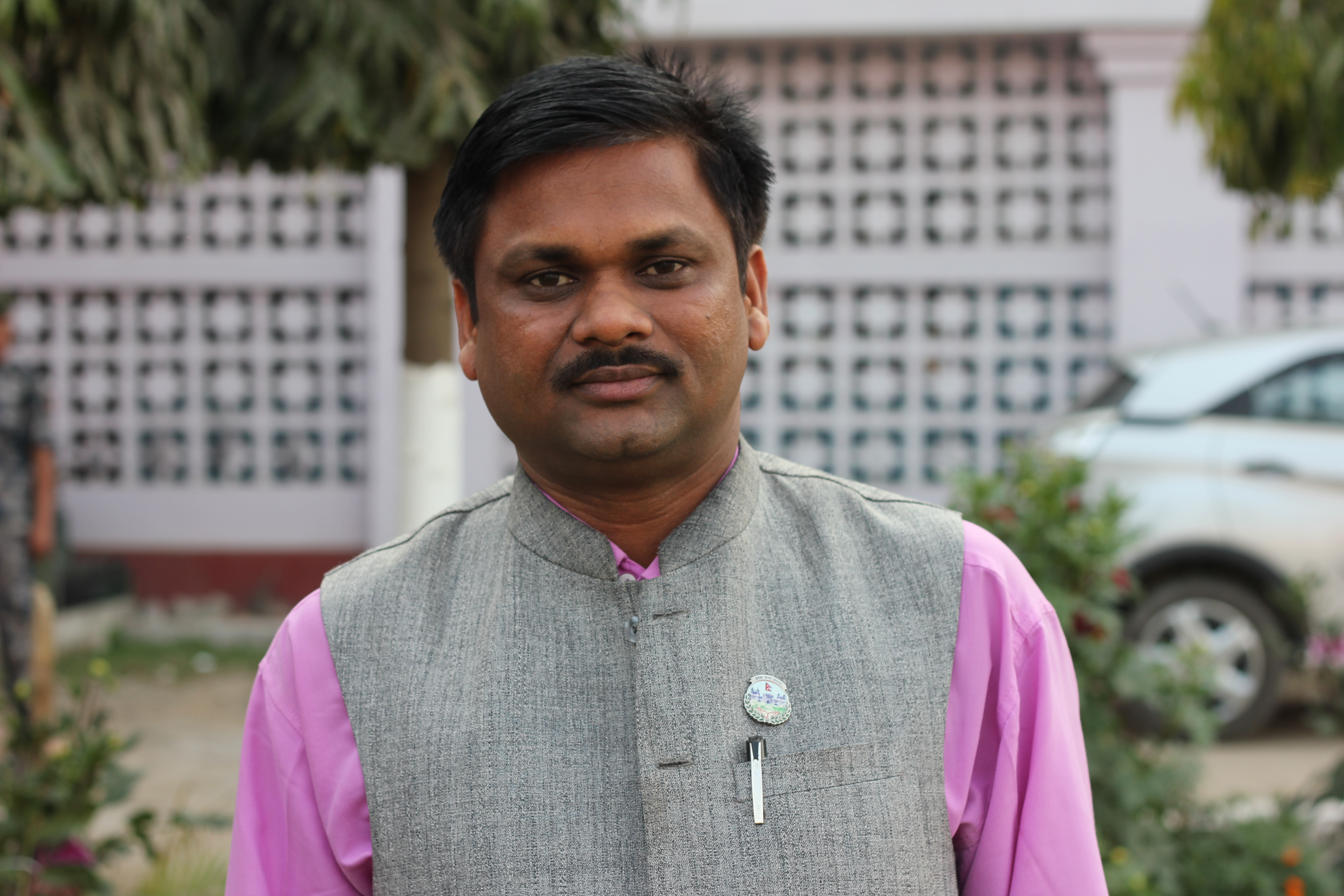
- Portrait of Shah in 2019

Provincial Assembly Member of Madhesh Province
- In office 2017–2022

Personal details
- Party: People's Socialist Party, Nepal
- Occupation: Politician

Netra Bikram Shah (Nepali: नेत्र विक्रम शाह) is a Nepalese politician, who is a former member of the Provincial Assembly of Madhesh Province, from People's Socialist Party, Nepal. Shah is a resident of Rajbiraj, Saptari.
