= Fuliya Devi Saday =

Nepalese politician

Honourable Fuliya Devi Saday
- फुलिया देवी सदाय

Province Assembly Member of Madhesh Province
- Incumbent
- Assumed office 2017
- Preceded by: N/A
- Constituency: Proportional list

Personal details
- Born: June 3, 1978 (age 47)
- Party: CPN (Maoist Centre)
- Occupation: Politician

Fuliya Devi Saday (Nepali: फुलिया देवी सदाय) is a Nepalese politician. She is a member of Provincial Assembly of Madhesh Province from CPN (Maoist Centre). Saday is a resident of Kalyanpur, Siraha.
