= Manoj Kumar (disambiguation) =

Manoj Kumar (1937–2025) was an Indian actor and filmmaker.

Manoj Kumar is also an Indian male name and may refer to:

- Manoj Kumar (boxer) (born 1986), Indian boxer
- Manoj Kumar (chess player) (born 1977), Fijian chess player
- Manoj Kumar (Bihar politician), Indian politician from Bihar
- Manoj Kumar (Delhi politician), Indian politician, member of the Delhi Legislative Assembly from 2013
- Manoj Kumar (Jharkhand politician) (born 1964), member of the 14th Lok Sabha of India
- Manoj Kumar (Rajasthan politician) or Manoj Nyangli, Indian politician from Rajasthan
- Manoj Kumar (Sasaram politician), member of 18th Lok Sabha of India
- Manoj Kumar (Tamil director), Indian film director in Tamil cinema

== See also ==
- Manchu Manoj (Manchu Manoj Kumar), Indian film actor
- Manoj (disambiguation)
- Kumar (disambiguation)
- Manoj Kumar Singh (disambiguation)
