= Kaushal Kumar Yadav =

Nepalese politician

Honourable Kaushal Kumar Yadav
- कौशल कुमार यादव

Province Assembly Member of Madhesh Province
- Incumbent
- Assumed office 2017
- Preceded by: N/A
- Constituency: Mahottari 4 (constituency)

Personal details
- Party: Loktantrik Samajwadi Party, Nepal
- Occupation: Politician

Kaushal Kumar Yadav (Nepali: कौशल कुमार यादव) is a Nepalese politician. He is a member of Provincial Assembly of Madhesh Province from People's Socialist Party, Nepal. Yadav, a resident of Sonama Rural Municipality, was elected via 2017 Nepalese provincial elections from Mahottari 4(A).

== Electoral history ==
=== 2017 Nepalese provincial elections ===
Party	Candidate	Votes
Federal Socialist Forum, Nepal	Kaushal Kumar Yadav	9,277
Nepali Congress	Gokhul Ray Yadav	7,393
CPN (Maoist Centre)	Ram Babu Chaudhary	6,626
Others		2,503
Invalid votes		1,446
Result	FSFN gain	
Source: Election Commission
