= Bechi Lungeli =

Nepalese politician

Honourable Bechi Lungeli
- बेची लुङ्गेली

Province Assembly Member of Madhesh Province
- Incumbent
- Assumed office 2017
- Preceded by: N/A
- Constituency: Sarlahi 1 (constituency)

Personal details
- Born: October 28, 1978 (age 47)
- Party: CPN (Unified Socialist)
- Occupation: Politician

Bechi Lungeli (Nepali: बेची लुङ्गेली) is a Nepalese CPN (Unified Socialist) politician. She is a member of Provincial Assembly of Madhesh Province . Lungeli, a resident of Lalbandi, was elected via 2017 Nepalese provincial elections from Sarlahi 1(B).

== Electoral history ==
=== 2017 Nepalese provincial elections ===
Party	Candidate	Votes
CPN (Unified Marxist–Leninist)	Bechi Lungeli	15,363
Nepali Congress	Sheikh Sah Dullah	9,197
Rastriya Janata Party Nepal	Ram Prasad Chaudhary	8,808
Others		880
Invalid votes		1,312
Result	CPN (UML) gain	
Source: Election Commission
