= Shobha Lama =

Nepalese politician

Honourable Shobha Lama
- शोभा लामा
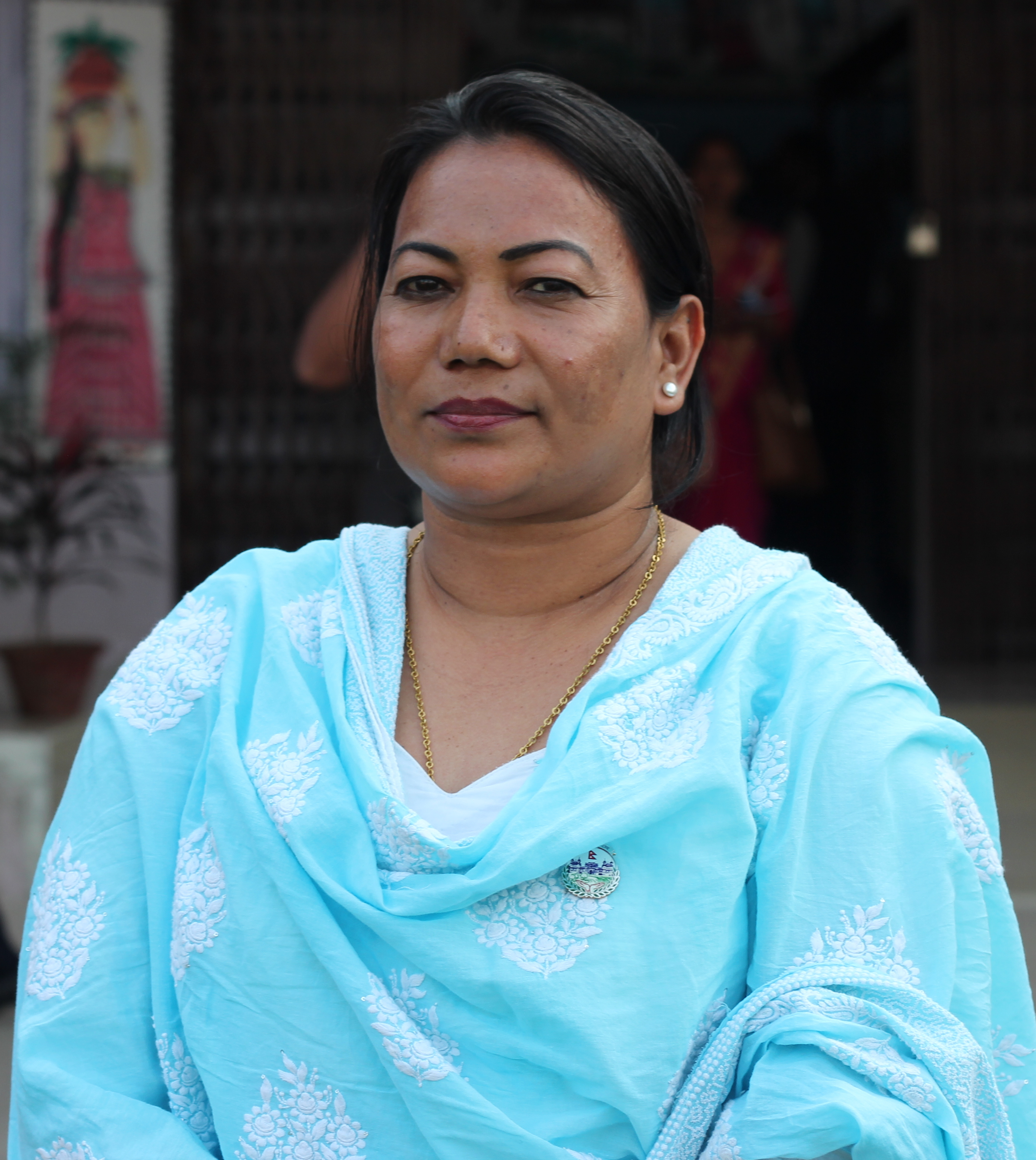
- Portrait of Lama in 2019

Province Assembly Member of Madhesh Province

Personal details
- Party: Nepali Congress
- Occupation: Politician

Shobha Lama (Nepali: शोभा लामा) is a Nepalese politician from Nepali Congress. Lama is a resident of Jitpursimara, who is elected member of Provincial Assembly of Madhesh Province.
