= Babulal Sah Kanu =

Nepalese politician

- बाबुलाल साह कानु
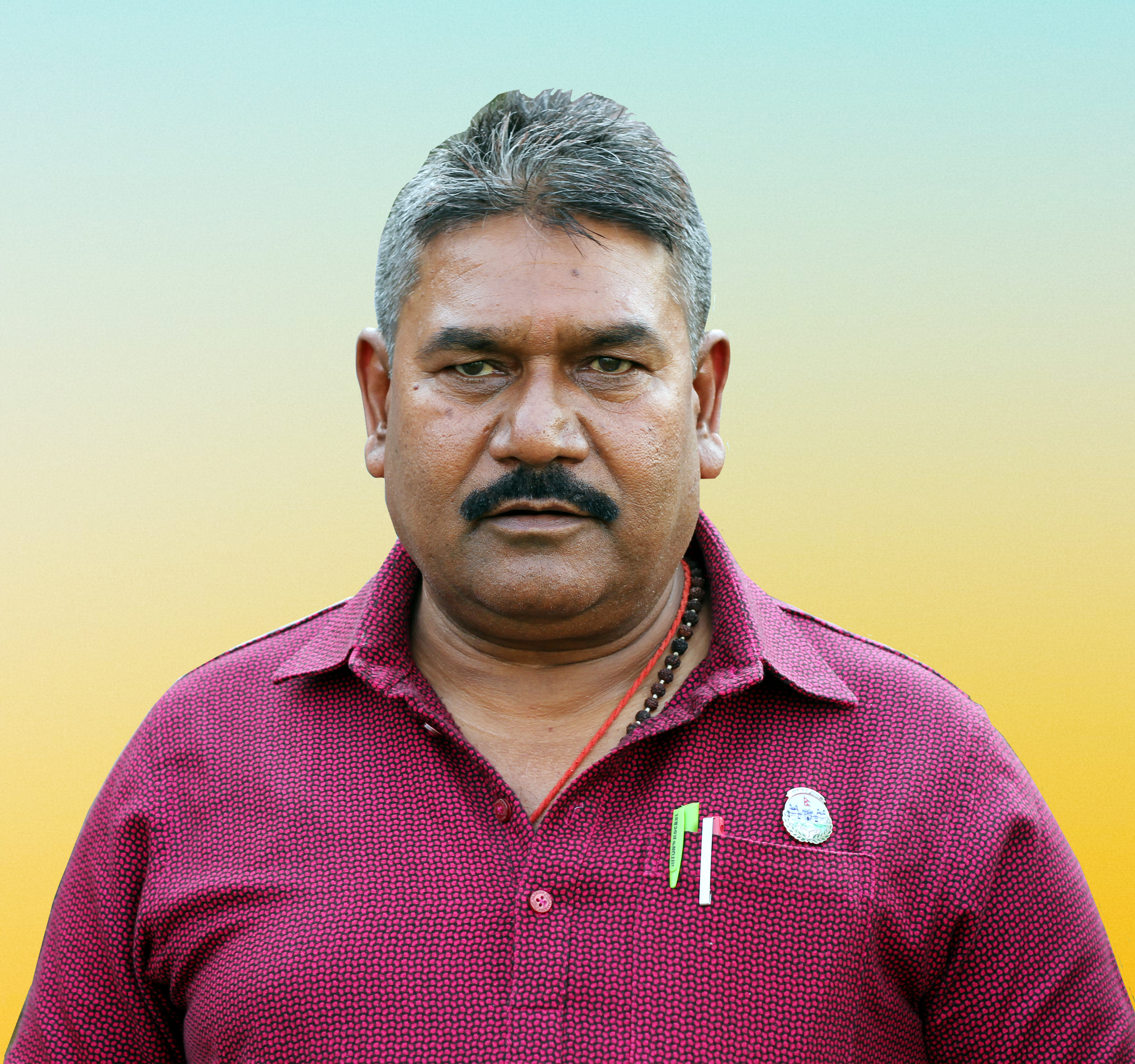
- Portrait of Kanu in 2019

Province Assembly Member of Madhesh Province
- In office 2017–2022
- Preceded by: N/A
- Succeeded by: Nagendra Sah
- Constituency: Rautahat 1 (A)

Personal details
- Party: Loktantrik Samajwadi Party, Nepal
- Occupation: Politician

Babulal Sah Kanu (Nepali: बाबुलाल साह कानु) is a Nepalese politician who is a former member of Provincial Assembly of Madhesh Province. Kanu, a resident of Gaur was elected to the 2017 provincial assembly election from Rautahat 1(A).

== Electoral history ==
=== 2017 Nepalese provincial elections ===
Party	Candidate	Votes
Rastriya Janata Party Nepal	Babu Lal Sah Kanu	10,524
CPN (Unified Marxist–Leninist)	Bhikhari Prasad Yadav	7,210
Nepali Congress	Nagendra Sah	7,150
Others		899
Invalid votes		1,480
Result	RJPN gain	
Source: Election Commission
