= Gita Kumari Yadav =

Nepalese politician

Honourable Gita Kumari Yadav
- गीता कुमारी यादव
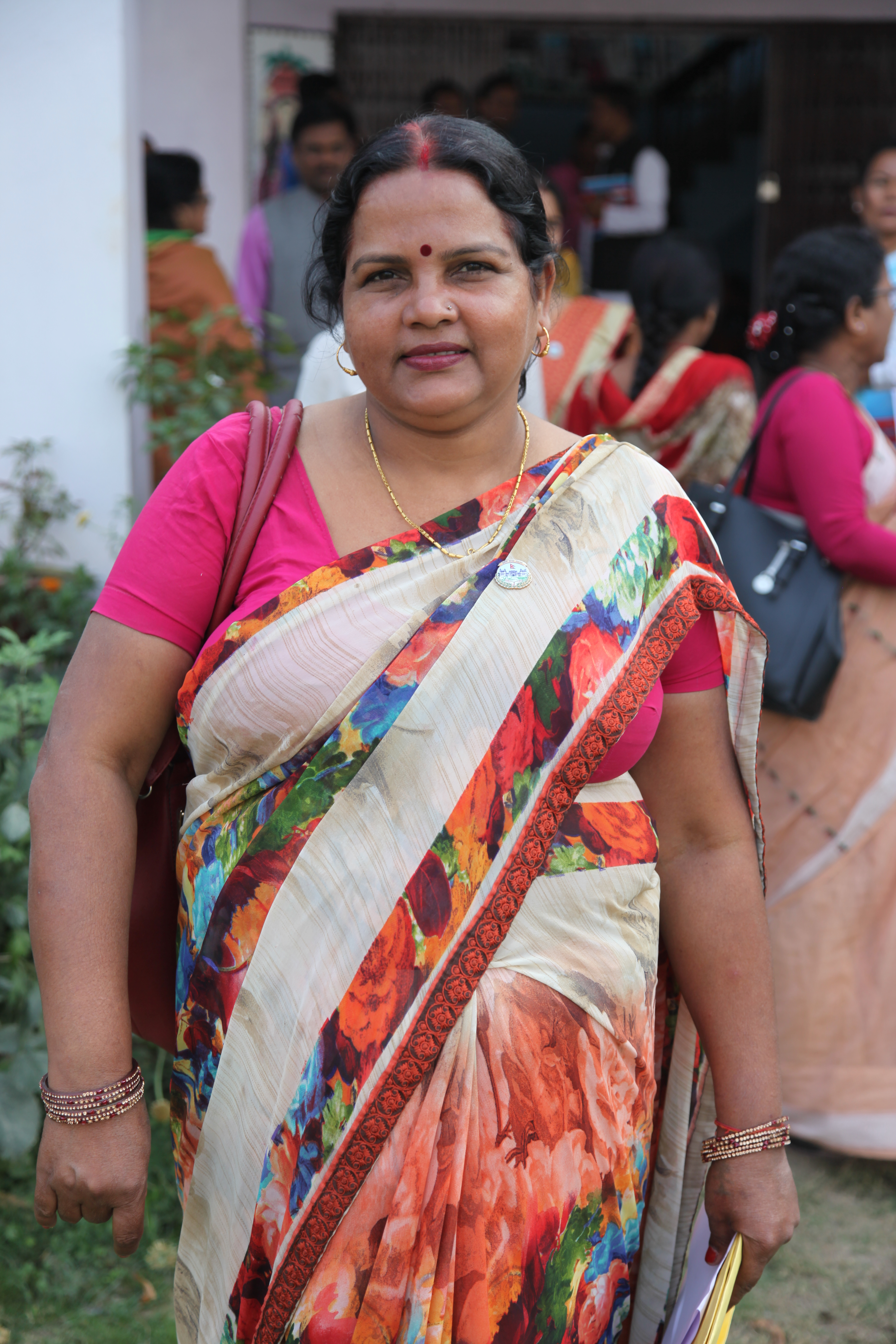
- Portrait of Yadav in 2019

Province Assembly Member of Madhesh Province
- Incumbent
- Assumed office 2017
- Constituency: Proportional list

Personal details
- Party: Nepali Congress
- Occupation: Politician

Gita Kumari Yadav (Nepali: गीता कुमारी यादव) is a Nepalese politician who is elected member of Provincial Assembly of Madhesh Province from Nepali Congress. Yadav is a resident of Rajbiraj.
