= Sambhu Lal Shrestha =

Nepali politician

Honourable Shambhu Lal Shrestha
- शम्भु लाल श्रेष्ठ

Member of Constituent Assembly
- In office 2013–2017
- Succeeded by: Pramod Sah
- Constituency: Sarlahi 1

Personal details
- Party: Nepali Congress
- Occupation: Politician

Shambhu Lal Shrestha is a Nepali politician and former Minister of Livestock belonging to Nepali Congress. He is the former member of 2nd Nepalese Constituent Assembly having been elected from Sarlahi 1.

== Electoral history ==
=== 2017 legislative elections ===
Party	Candidate	Votes
Rastriya Janata Party Nepal	Pramod Sah	22,036
CPN (Unified Marxist–Leninist)	Dhruba Prasad Gautam	21,465
Nepali Congress	Shambhu Lal Shrestha	20,075
Others		1,636
Invalid votes		3,417
Result	RJPN gain	
Source: Election Commission

=== 2013 Constituent Assembly election ===
Party	Candidate	Votes
UCPN (Maoist)	Shambhu Lal Shrestha	9,476
CPN (Unified Marxist–Leninist)	Jhala Nath Khanal	8,791
Terai Madhesh Sadbhavna Party	Chandra Singh Kushwaha	4,588
Nepali Congress	Sushila Karki	3,896
Rastriya Prajatantra Party Nepal	Narayan Shrestha	2,729
Terai Madhesh Loktantrik Party	Gopal Panjiyar	2,050
Sadbhavana Party	Rup Narayan Singh Danuwar	1,614
Madhesi Jana Adhikar Forum, Nepal (Democratic)	Shiva Kumar Gurmachhane	1,399
Rastriya Madhesh Samajbadi Party	Jagat Narayan Shrestha	1,107
Others		2,466
Result	Maoist gain	
Source: NepalNews
