= Anju Kumari =

Nepalese politician

- अन्जु कुमारी
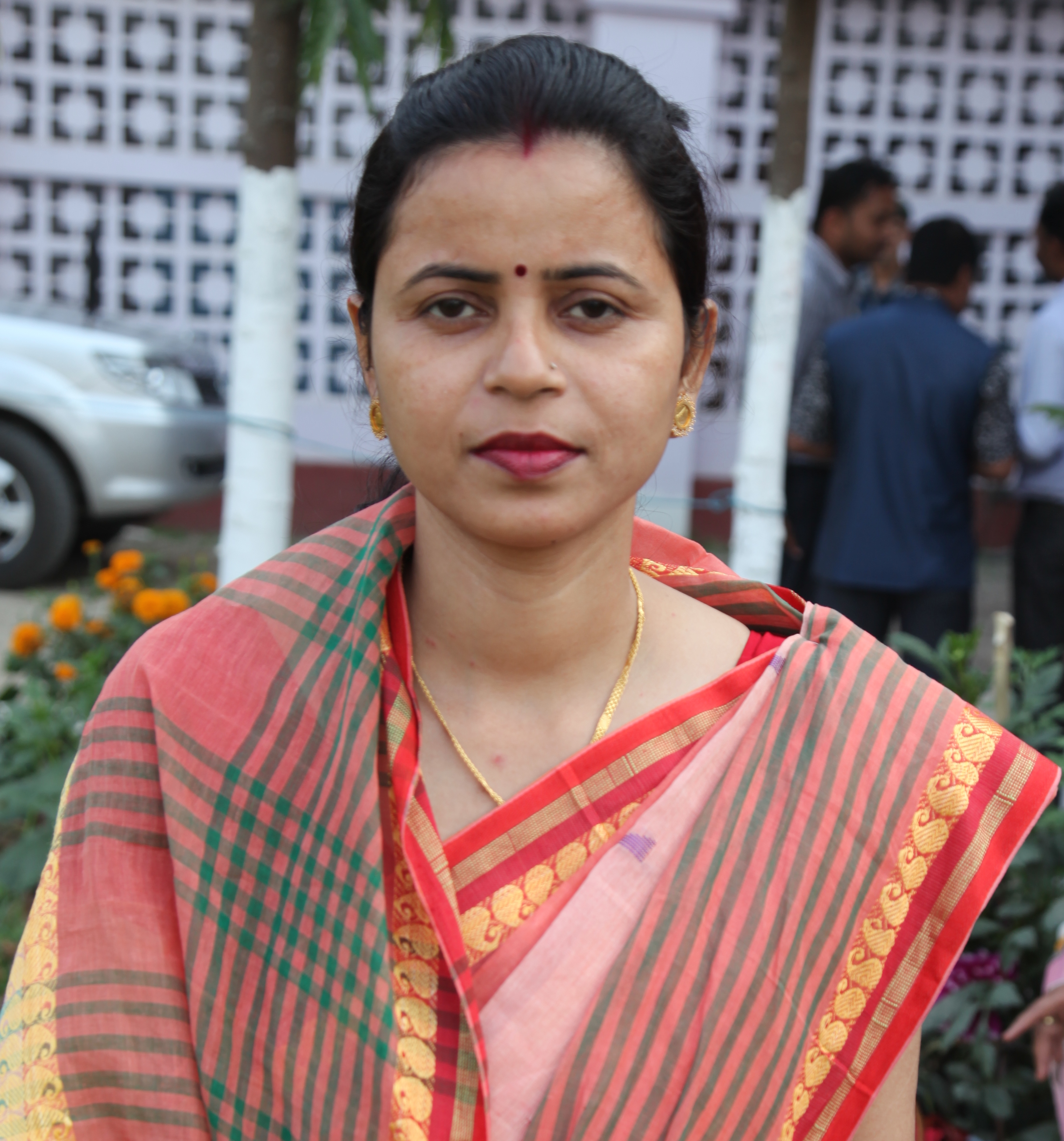
- Portrait of Kumari in 2019

Province Assembly Member of Madhesh Province
- In office 2017–2022
- Preceded by: Assembly created
- Constituency: Proportional list

Personal details
- Party: People's Socialist Party, Nepal
- Occupation: Politician

Anju Kumari Yadav (Nepali: अन्जु कुमारी यादव) is a Nepalese politician who is former member of Provincial Assembly of Madhesh Province from People's Socialist Party, Nepal. Yadav is a resident of Birgunj, Parsa.
