= Upendra Mahato =

Nepalese politician (born 1978)

Honourable Upendra Mahato
- उपेन्द्र महतो

Province Assembly Member of Madhesh Province
- Incumbent
- Assumed office 2017
- Preceded by: N/A
- Constituency: Sarlahi 1 (constituency)

Personal details
- Born: December 30, 1978 (age 47)
- Party: Loktantrik Samajwadi Party, Nepal
- Occupation: Politician

Upendra Mahato(Nepali: उपेन्द्र महतो) is a Nepalese politician. He is a member of Provincial Assembly of Madhesh Province from Loktantrik Samajwadi Party, Nepal. Mahato, a resident of Chandranagar Rural Municipality, was elected via 2017 Nepalese provincial elections from Sarlahi 1(A).

== Electoral history ==
=== 2017 Nepalese provincial elections ===
Party	Candidate	Votes
Rastriya Janata Party Nepal	Upendra Mahato	12,603
CPN (Maoist Centre)	Ram Chandra Singh Kushwaha	8,893
Nepali Congress	Manoj Kumar Singh	6,479
Independent	Santosh Kumar Thapa	2,249
Others		1,215
Invalid votes		1,489
Result	RJPN gain	
Source: Election Commission
