= Shiv Chandra Chaudhary =

Nepalese politician

Honourable Shiv Chandra Chaudhary
- शिवचन्द्र चौधरी

Province Assembly Member of Madhesh Province
- Incumbent
- Assumed office 2017
- Preceded by: Assembly Created
- Constituency: Proportional list

Personal details
- Party: Nepali Congress
- Occupation: Politician

Shiv Chandra Chaudhary (Nepali: शिवचन्द्र चौधरी) is a Nepalese politician from Nepali Congress. Chaudhary is a resident of Nagarain, who is elected member of Provincial Assembly of Madhesh Province.

== See also ==
- Bimalendra Nidhi
- Ram Saroj Yadav
