= Nira Kumari Sah =

Nepalese politician

- निरा कुमारी साह

Province Assembly Member of Madhesh Province
- In office 2017–2022
- Preceded by: N/A

Personal details
- Born: June 12, 1987 (age 38)
- Party: People's Socialist Party, Nepal
- Occupation: Politician

Nira Kumari Sah (Nepali: निरा कुमारी साह) is a Nepalese politician. She is a former member of Provincial Assembly of Madhesh Province from People's Socialist Party, Nepal. Sah is a resident of Malangwa, Sarlahi.
