= Nilam Devi Bhumiharani =

Nepalese politician

Honourable Nilam Devi Bhumiharani
- निलम देवी भुमिहारीन
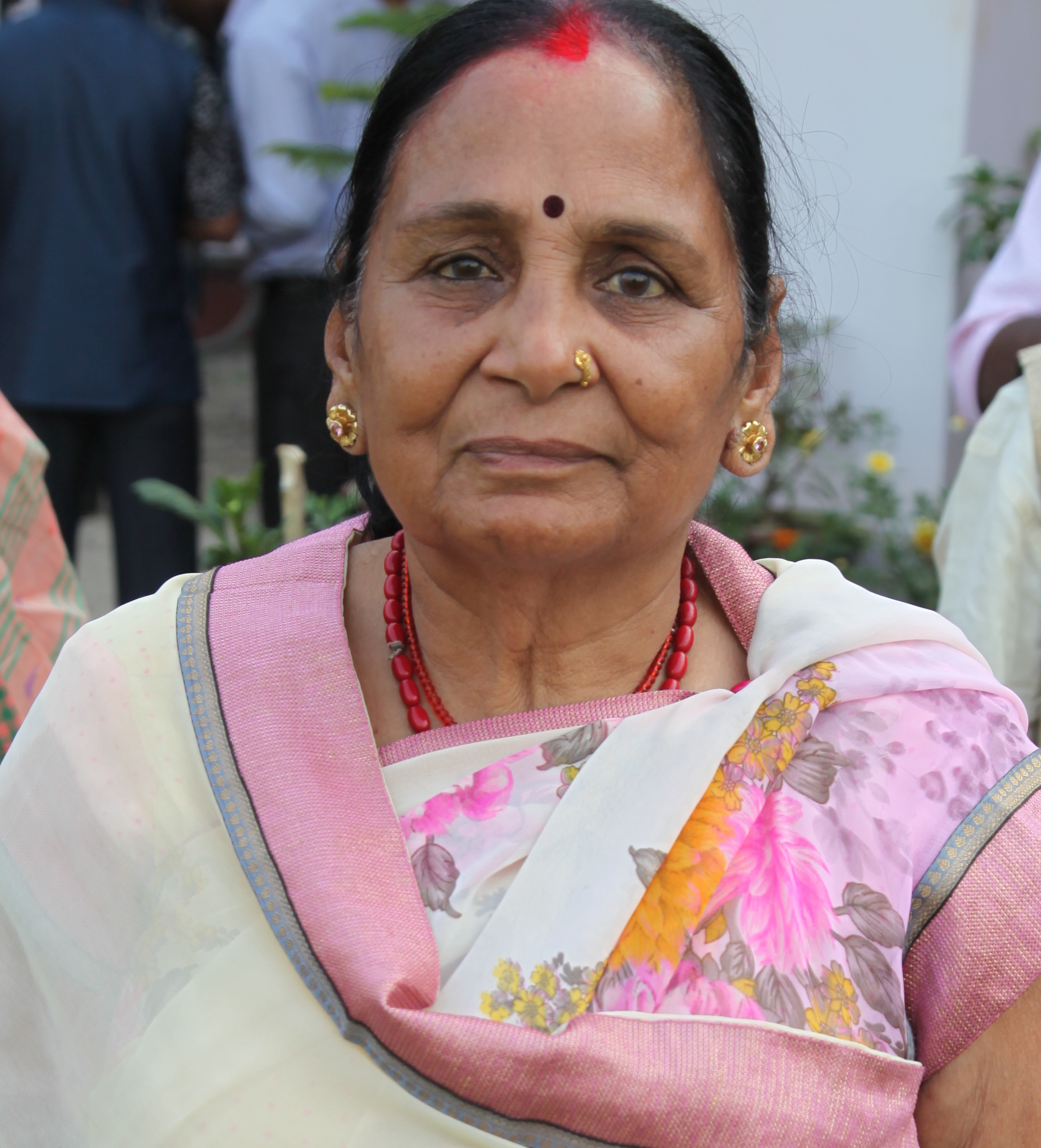
- Portrait of Bhumiharin in 2019

Province Assembly Member of Madhesh Province

Personal details
- Party: Loktantrik Samajbadi Party, Nepal
- Occupation: Politician

Nilam Devi Bhumiharani or Nilam Devi Bhumiharin (Nepali: निलम देवी भुमिहारीन) is a Nepalese politician who is elected member of Provincial Assembly of Madhesh Province from Loktantrik Samajbadi Party, Nepal. Shah is a resident of Balara, Nepal.
