= Upama Kumari Dev =

Nepalese politician

- उपमा कुमारी देव
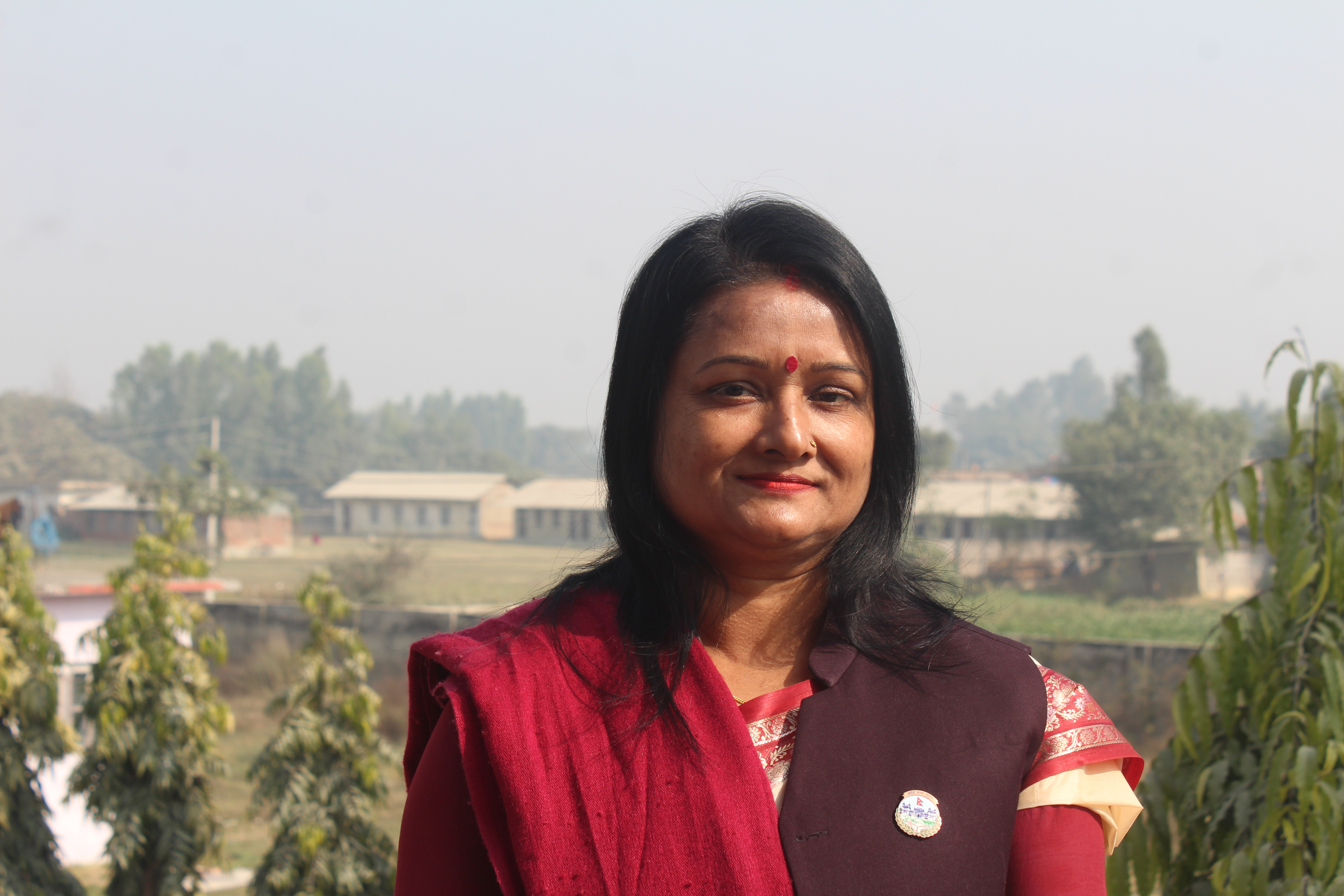
- Portrait of Dev in 2019

1st Deputy Speaker of Provincial Assmbley of Madhesh Province
- In office 16 February 2018 – 2022
- Governor: Ratneshwar Lal Kayastha; Tilak Pariyar; Rajesh Jha; Hari Shankar Mishra
- Speaker: Saroj Kumar Yadav
- Chief minister: Lalbabu Raut
- Preceded by: Position created

Province Assembly Member of Madhesh Province
- In office 2017–2022
- Preceded by: Position created
- Constituency: Proportional list

Personal details
- Party: People's Socialist Party, Nepal
- Occupation: Politician

Upama Kumari Dev (Nepali: उपमा कुमारी देव) is a Nepalese politician who is former member of Provincial Assembly of Madhesh Province from People's Socialist Party, Nepal. Dev is a resident of Rajbiraj. She is also a Deputy Speaker of Provincial Assembly of Madhesh Province, took office on 16 February 2018.
