= Babita Kumari (Nepalese politician) =

Nepalese politician

Honourable Babita Kumari
- बबिता कुमारी

Province Assembly Member of Madhesh Province
- Incumbent
- Assumed office 2017
- Preceded by: N/A
- Constituency: Proportional list

Personal details
- Born: July 18, 1975 (age 50)
- Party: Loktantrik Samajwadi Party, Nepal
- Occupation: Politician

Babita Kumari (Nepali: बबिता कुमारी) is a Nepalese politician. She is a member of Provincial Assembly of Madhesh Province from Loktantrik Samajwadi Party, Nepal. Kumari is a resident of Jaleshwar, Mahottari.
