= Janaki Sharan Sah =

Nepalese politician

Honourable Janaki Sharan Sah
- जानकी शरण साह

Province Assembly Member of Madhesh Province
- Incumbent
- Assumed office 2017
- Preceded by: N/A
- Constituency: Proportional list

Personal details
- Born: February 9, 1963 (age 63)
- Party: Loktantrik Samajbadi Party, Nepal
- Occupation: Politician

Janaki Sharan Sah (Nepali: जानकी शरण साह) is a Nepalese politician. He is a member of Provincial Assembly of Madhesh Province from Loktantrik Samajbadi Party, Nepal. Sah is a resident of Loharpatti, Mahottari.
