= Hasima Khatun =

Nepalese politician

Honourable Hasima Khatun
- हसिमा खातुन
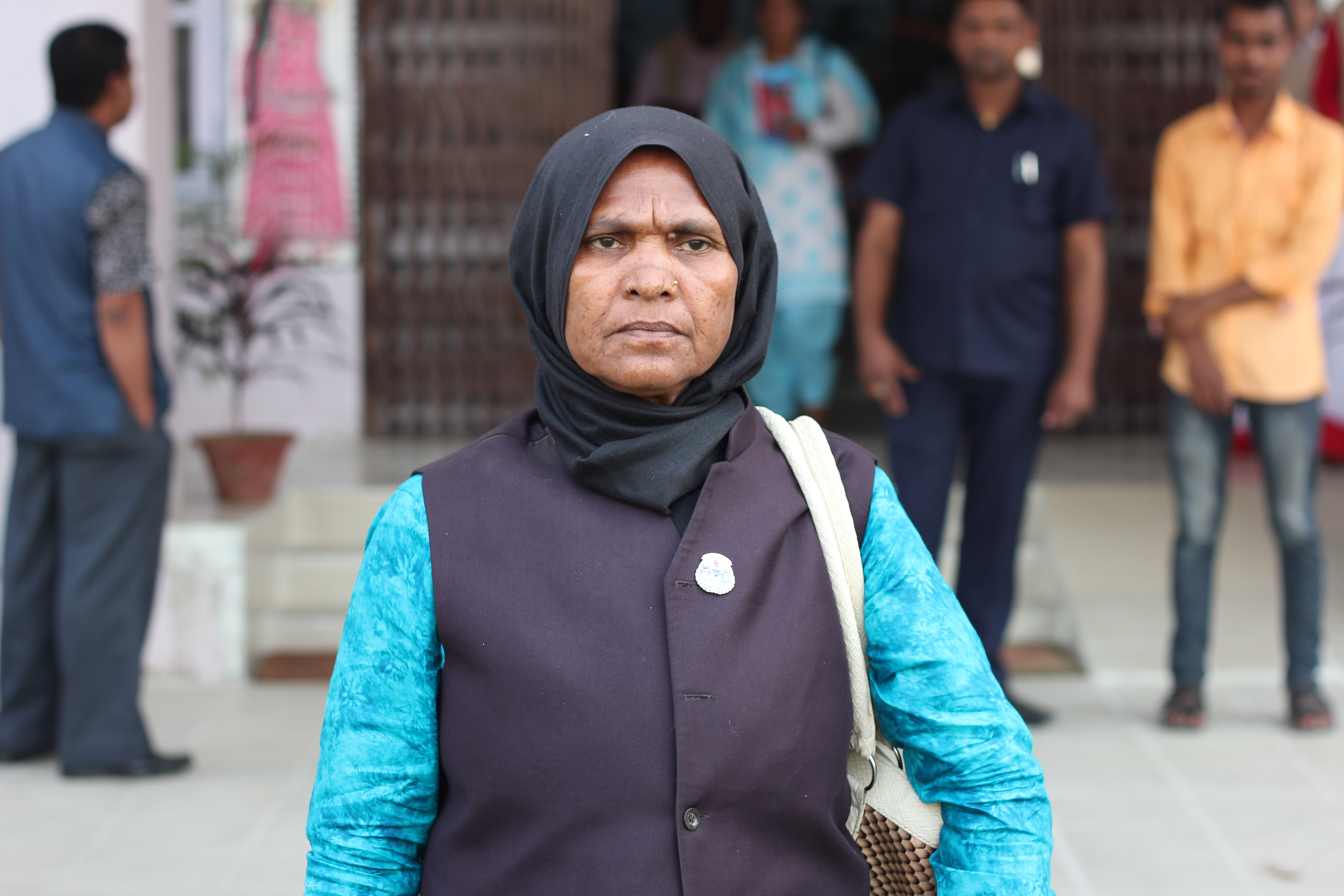
- Portrait of Khatun in 2019

Province Assembly Member of Madhesh Province
- Incumbent
- Assumed office 2017
- Constituency: Proportional list

Personal details
- Party: CPN(Unified Socialist)
- Occupation: Politician

Hasima Khatun (Nepali: हसिमा खातुन) is a Nepalese politician who is elected member of Provincial Assembly of Madhesh Province from CPN(Unified Socialist). Khatun is a resident of Brindaban, Rautahat.
