= Asiya Devi Tharuni =

Nepalese politician

Honourable Asiya Devi Tharuni
- आशिया देवी थरुनी

Province Assembly Member of Madhesh Province
- Incumbent
- Assumed office 2017
- Preceded by: N/A
- Constituency: Proportional list

Personal details
- Born: May 13, 1957 (age 68)
- Party: Nepali Congress
- Occupation: Politician

Asiya Devi Tharuni (Nepali: आशिया देवी थरुनी) is a Nepalese politician. She is a member of Provincial Assembly of Madhesh Province from Nepali Congress. Tharuni is a resident of Parsagadhi, Parsa.
