= Alka Kumari Jha =

Nepalese politician

- अल्का कुमारी झा
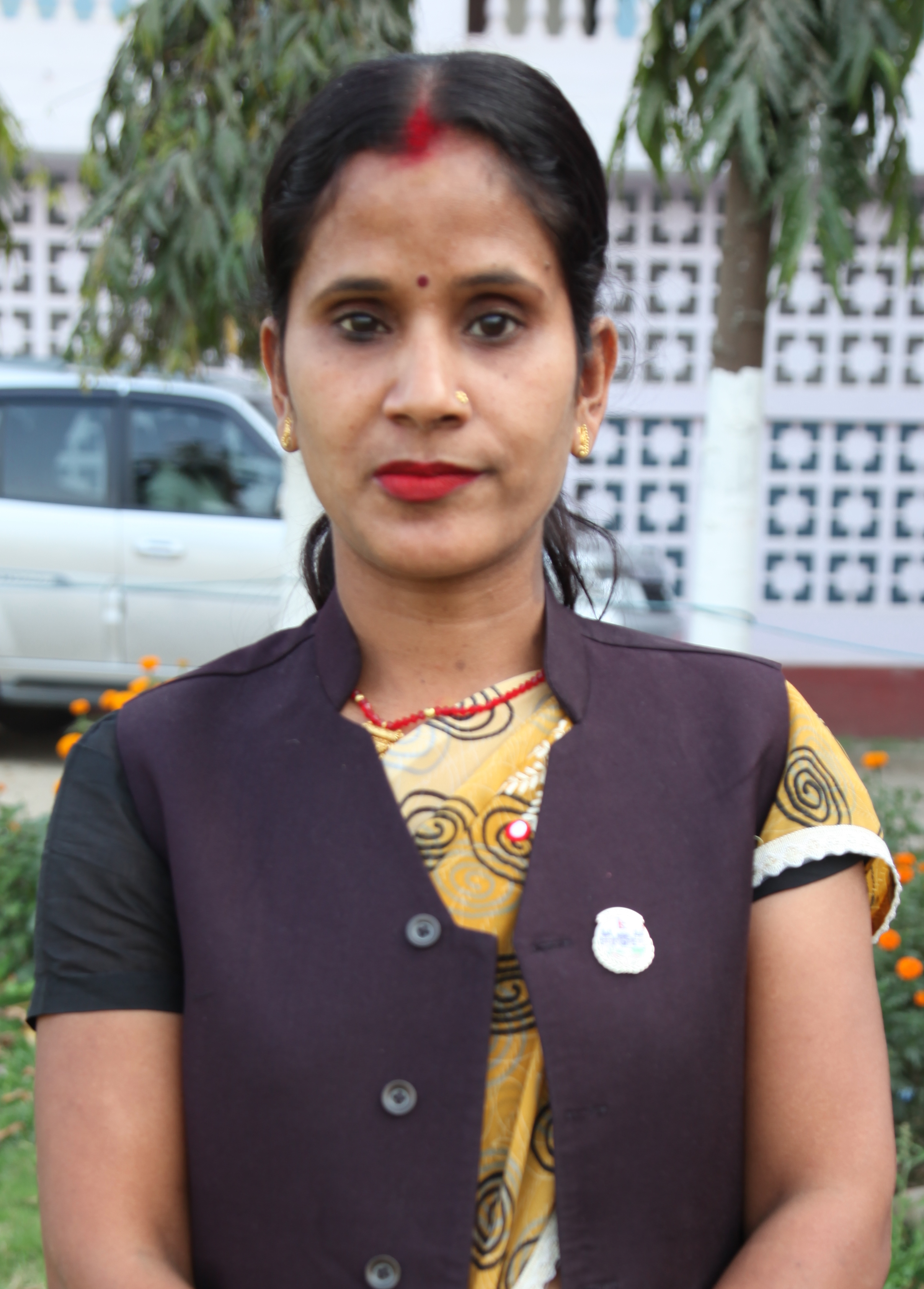
- Portrait of Jha in 2019

Provincial Assembly Member of Madhesh Province
- Incumbent
- Assumed office 2017
- Constituency: Proportional list

Personal details
- Party: Loktantrik Samajwadi Party, Nepal
- Occupation: Politician

Alka Kumari Jha (Nepali: अल्का कुमारी झा) is a Nepalese politician who is member of Provincial Assembly of Madhesh Province. Jha left People's Socialist Party and joined Loktantrik Samajwadi Party since 2021.
