= Saroj Kumar Singh =

Nepalese politician

Honourable Saroj Kumar Singh
- सरोज कुमार सिंह

State Minister for Internal Affairs and Law of Madhesh Province
- In office 1 March 2018 – 17 July 2021 Serving with Rubi Kumari Karn
- Minister: Bharat Prasad Sah
- Governor: Ratneshwar Lal Kayastha; Tilak Pariyar; Rajesh Jha; Hari Shankar Mishra
- Chief minister: Lalbabu Raut
- Preceded by: Assembly created

Province Assembly Member of Madhesh Province
- Incumbent
- Assumed office 2017
- Preceded by: N/A
- Constituency: Mahottari 4 (constituency)

Personal details
- Born: October 21, 1981 (age 44)
- Party: People's Socialist Party, Nepal
- Occupation: Politician

Saroj Kumar Singh (Nepali: सरोज कुमार सिंह) is a Nepalese politician. He is a member of Provincial Assembly of Madhesh Province from People's Socialist Party, Nepal. Singh, a resident of Manara, Nepal, was elected via 2017 Nepalese provincial elections from Mahottari 4(B).

== Electoral history ==
=== 2017 Nepalese provincial elections ===
Party	Candidate	Votes
Federal Socialist Forum, Nepal	Saroj Kumar Singh	7,555
CPN (Unified Marxist-Leninist)	Saroj Kumar Yadav	5,079
Nepali Congress	Diptanshu Pratap Singh	4,567
Independent	Ram Padartha Mandal	2,477
Independent	Raj Kumar Daha	1,615
Independent	Bharat Sahani	1,534
Others		2,652
Invalid votes		1,688
Result	FSFN gain	
Source: Election Commission
