= Mahendra Kumar Raya =

Nepali politician

- महेन्द्र कुमार राय

Member of Parliament, Pratinidhi Sabha
- In office 22 December 2022 – 12 September 2025
- Preceded by: Surendra Kumar Yadav
- Succeeded by: Gauri Kumari Yadav
- Constituency: Mahottari 4
- In office May 1999 – May 2002
- Preceded by: Sharat Singh Bhandari
- Succeeded by: Ram Kumar Sharma
- Constituency: Mahottari 4

Personal details
- Born: March 31, 1959 (age 67) Mahottari District, Nepal
- Party: Nepali Congress

Mahendra Kumar Raya (Nepali: महेन्द्र कुमार राय) is a Nepalese politician. He is an elected central working committee member of the Nepali Congress.

He was elected to the Pratinidhi Sabha in the 1999 election on behalf of the Nepali Congress.

== Electoral history ==
=== 2017 legislative elections ===
Mahottari 4
Party	Candidate	Votes
Federal Socialist Forum, Nepal	Surendra Kumar Yadav	18,353
Nepali Congress	Mahendra Kumar Raya	13,025
CPN (Unified Marxist–Leninist)	Mohammad Razi Haider	12,945
Independent	Devendra Kumar Yadav	1,647
Naya Shakti Party, Nepal	Sanjay Kumar Shah	1,093
Others		3,519
Invalid votes		3,947
Result	FSFN gain	
Source: Election Commission

=== 2008 Constituent Assembly election ===
Mahhotari 5
Party	Candidate	Votes
Madheshi Janaadhikar Forum, Nepal	Kaushal Kumar Raya Yadav	8,609
Nepali Congress	Mahendra Kumar Raya	6,954
Others		15,158
Result	MJFN gain	
Source: Election Commission

=== 1999 legislative elections ===
Mahottari 4
Party	Candidate	Votes
Nepali Congress	Mahendra Kumar Raya	19,647
Rastriya Prajatantra Party	Ram Vilas Yadav	11,177
Samyukta Janamorcha Nepal	Parmananda Chaudhary Kalwar	10,201
Nepal Sadbhawana Party	Ram Chhabila Ray	4,261
Rastriya Prajatantra Party (Chand)	Ram Babu Singh	1,597
CPN (Marxist–Leninist)	Surendra Raj Singh Shrestha	1,526
Others		1,013
Invalid Votes		2,441
Result	Congress hold	
Source: Election Commission
