= Jagataren Devi Sudin =

Nepalese politician

Honourable Jagataren Devi Sudin
- जगतारेन देवी सुडीन
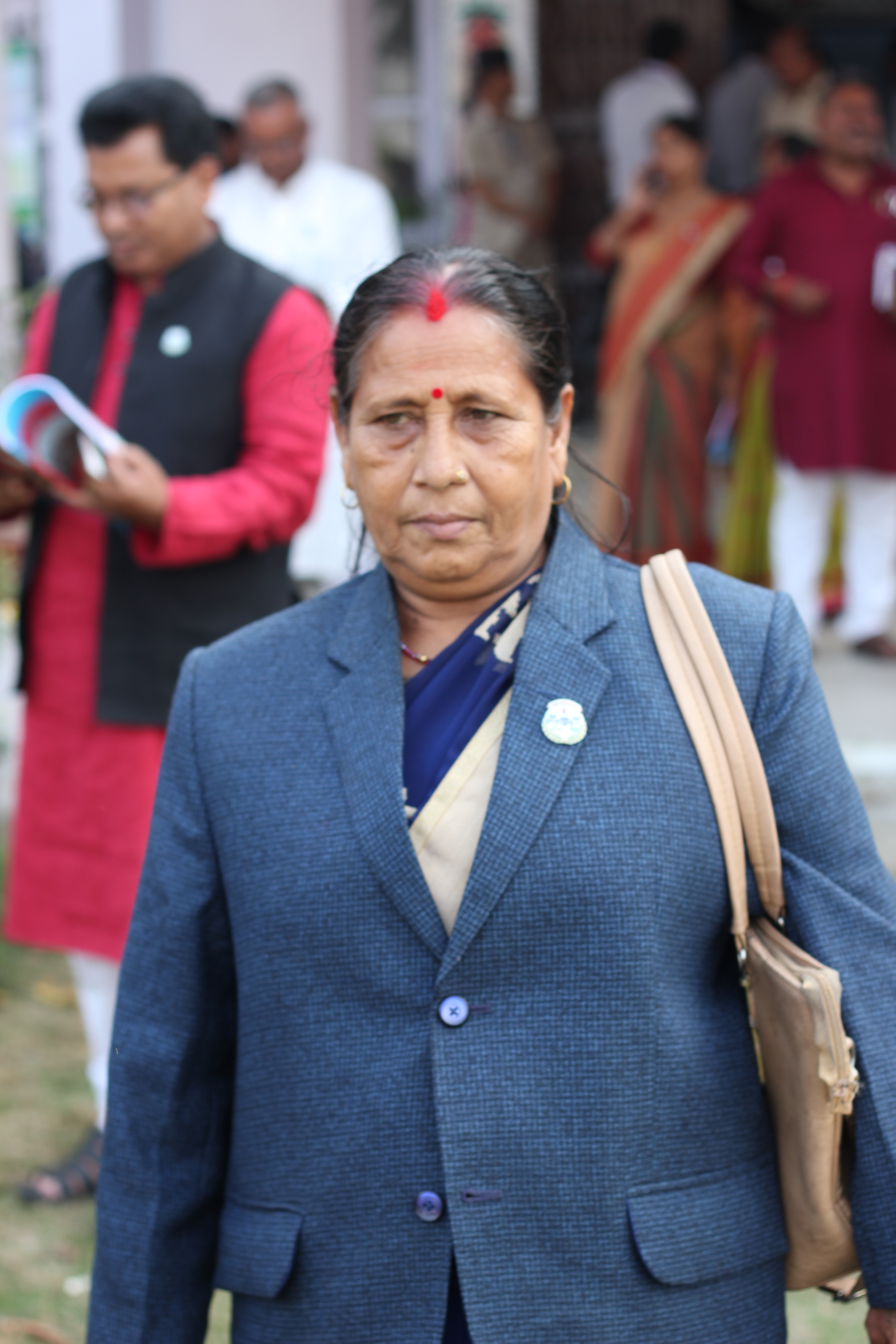
- Portrait of Sudin in 2019

Province Assembly Member of Madhesh Province
- Incumbent
- Assumed office 2017
- Preceded by: N/A
- Constituency: Proportional list

Personal details
- Party: CPN (Unified Marxist–Leninist)
- Occupation: Politician

Jagataren Devi Sudin (Nepali: जगतारेन देवी सुडीन) is a Nepalese politician who is elected member of Provincial Assembly of Madhesh Province from CPN (Unified Marxist–Leninist). Sudin is a resident of Naraha Rural Municipality, Siraha.
