= Ram Kumar Yadav (Nepalese politician) =

Nepalese politician

Honourable Ram Kumar Yadav
- राम कुमार यादव

Province Assembly Member of Madhesh Province
- Incumbent
- Assumed office 2017
- Preceded by: N/A
- Constituency: Siraha 3 (constituency)

Personal details
- Born: December 9, 1954 (age 71)
- Party: CPN (Maoist Centre)
- Occupation: Politician

Ram Kumar Yadav (Nepali: राम कुमार यादव) is a Nepalese politician. He is a member of Provincial Assembly of Madhesh Province from CPN (Maoist Centre). Yadav, a resident of Golbazar, Siraha, was elected via 2017 Nepalese provincial elections from Siraha 3(A).

== Electoral history ==
=== 2017 Nepalese provincial elections ===
Party	Candidate	Votes
CPN (Maoist Centre)	Ram Kumar Yadav	11,866
Federal Socialist Forum, Nepal	Manoj Kumar Singh	10,933
Nepali Congress	Mustaq Ansari	4,158
Others		1,570
Invalid votes		1,547
Result	Maoist Centre gain	
Source: Election Commission
