= Manoj Kumar Singh (Nepalese politician) =

Nepalese politician

Honourable Manoj Kumar Singh
- मनोज कुमार सिंह
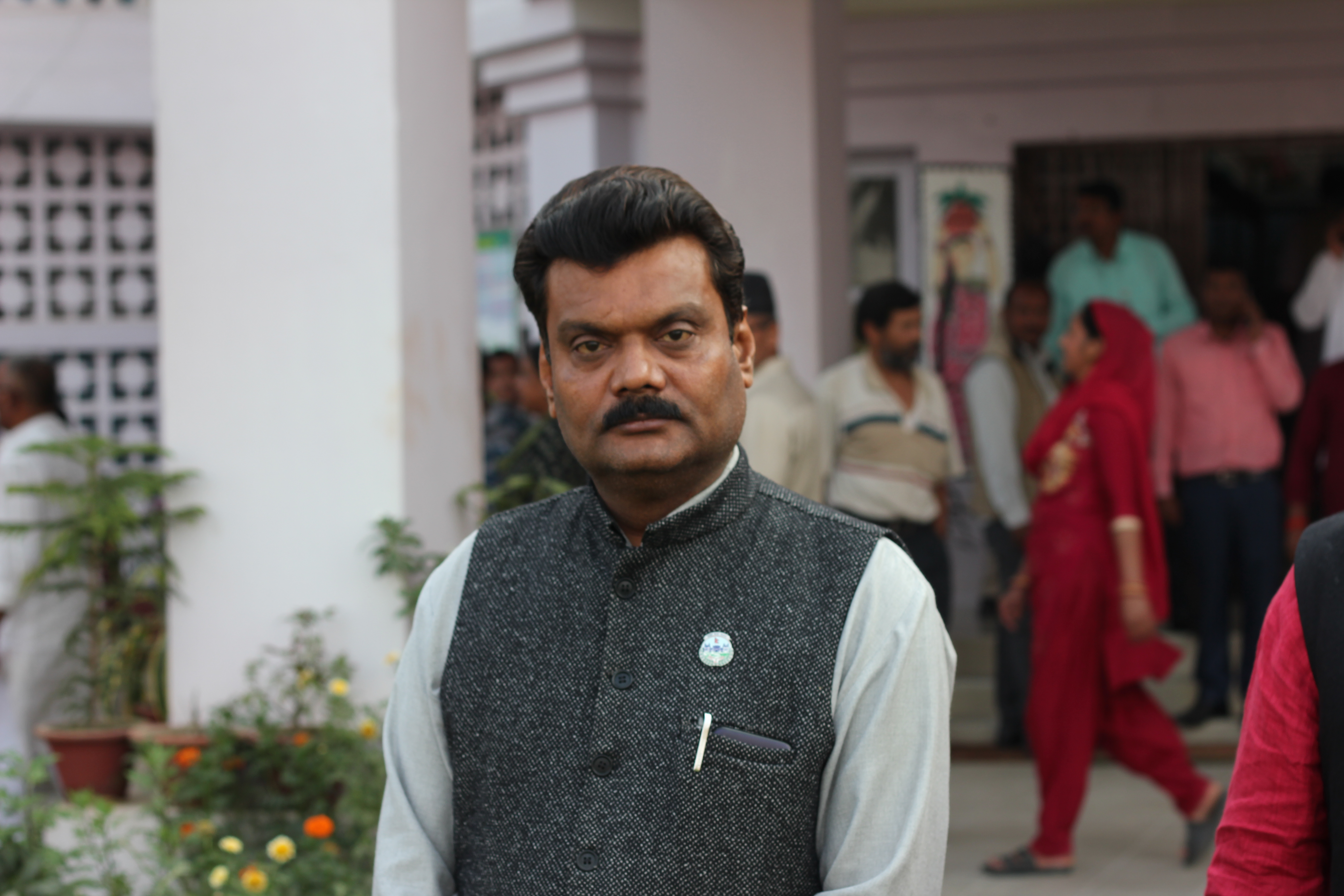
- Portrait of Singh in 2019

Province Assembly Member of Madhesh Province
- Incumbent
- Assumed office 2017

Personal details
- Party: CPN (Unified Marxist–Leninist)
- Occupation: Politician

Manoj Kumar Singh (Nepali: मनोज कुमार सिंह) is a Nepalese politician who is elected member of Provincial Assembly of Madhesh Province from CPN (Unified Marxist–Leninist). Singh is a resident of Tilathi Koiladi Rural Municipality, Saptari.
