= Manju Kumari Yadav (Bhangaha) =

Nepalese politician

Honourable Manju Kumari Yadav
- मन्जु कुमारी यादव

Province Assembly Member of Madhesh Province
- Incumbent
- Assumed office 2017
- Preceded by: new office

Personal details
- Born: January 11, 1982 (age 44)
- Party: CPN (Unified Socialist)
- Occupation: Politician

Manju Kumari Yadav (Nepali: मन्जु कुमारी यादव) is a Nepalese politician. She is a member of Provincial Assembly of Madhesh Province from CPN (Unified Socialist). Yadav is a resident of Bhangaha, Mahottari.
