= Siraha 3 =

Parliamentary constituency in Madhesh Province, Nepal

- Parliamentary constituency
- Siraha 3 in Province No. 2
- Province: Province No. 2
- District: Siraha District

Current constituency
- Created: 1991
- Party: Rastriya Swatantra Party
- Member of Parliament: Shambhu Kumar Yadav

Siraha 3 is one of four parliamentary constituencies of Siraha District in Nepal. This constituency came into existence on the Constituency Delimitation Commission (CDC) report submitted on 31 August 2017.

== Incorporated areas ==
Siraha 3 incorporates Siraha Municipality, wards 1 and 2 of Naraha Rural Municipality, wards 1 and 5 of Bishnupur Rural Municipality, 1–3 of Arnama Rural Municipality and ward 1–12 of Golbazar Municipality.

== Assembly segments ==
It encompasses the following Province No. 2 Provincial Assembly segment

- Siraha 3(A)
- Siraha 3(B)

== Members of Parliament ==
=== Parliament/Constituent Assembly ===
Election	Member	Party
1991	Suresh Chandra Das	Nepali Congress
1999	Krishna Charan Shrestha	Rastriya Prajatantra Party
2008	Bijay Kumar Yadav	Madheshi Janaadhikar Forum, Nepal
2013	Sita Devi Yadav	Nepali Congress
2017	Lila Nath Shrestha	CPN (UML)
May 2018	Lila Nath Shrestha	Nepal Communist Party
2026	Shambhu Kumar Yadav	Rastriya Swatantra Party

=== Provincial Assembly ===
==== 2(A) ====
Election	Member	Party
2017	Ram Kumar Yadav	CPN (Maoist Centre)
May 2018	Ram Kumar Yadav	Nepal Communist Party

==== 2(B) ====
Election	Member	Party
2017	Pramod Kumar Yadav	CPN (Unified Marxist-Leninist)
May 2018	Pramod Kumar Yadav	Nepal Communist Party
March 2021	Pramod Kumar Yadav	CPN (Unified Marxist–Leninist)
August 2021	Pramod Kumar Yadav	CPN (Unified Socialist)

== Election results ==
=== Election in the 2020s ===
==== 2022 general election ====
Candidate	Party	Votes	%
Lila Nath Shrestha	CPN (UML)	28,064	40.43
Bishwanath Sah	CPN (Maoist Centre)	26,882	38.73
Dinesh Kumar Yadav	Janamat Party	11,146	16.06
Gobardhan Das Tatma	Rastriya Prajatantra Party	1,259	1.81
Others		2,055	2.96
Total		69,406	100.00
Majority		1,182	
CPN (UML)			

=== Election in the 2010s ===
==== 2017 legislative elections ====
Party	Candidate	Votes
CPN (Unified Marxist–Leninist)	Lila Nath Shrestha	23,272
Federal Socialist Forum, Nepal	Asheshwar Yadav	21,220
Nepali Congress	Amar Regmi	11,778
Others		1,862
Invalid votes		3,620
Result	CPN (UML) gain	
Source: Election Commission

==== 2017 Nepalese provincial elections ====
===== 2(A) =====
Party	Candidate	Votes
CPN (Maoist Centre)	Ram Kumar Yadav	11,866
Federal Socialist Forum, Nepal	Manoj Kumar Singh	10,933
Nepali Congress	Mustaq Ansari	4,158
Others		1,570
Invalid votes		1,547
Result	Maoist Centre gain	
Source: Election Commission

===== 2(B) =====
Party	Candidate	Votes
CPN (Unified Marxist–Leninist)	Pramod Kumar Yadav	11,954
Nepali Congress	Subhash Chandra Yadav	9,586
Federal Socialist Forum, Nepal	Manoranjan Goit	8,268
Others		587
Invalid votes		1,190
Result	CPN (UML) gain	
Source: Election Commission

==== 2013 Constituent Assembly election ====
Party	Candidate	Votes
Nepali Congress	Sita Devi Yadav	11,142
CPN (Unified Marxist–Leninist)	Pramod Kumar Yadav	7,964
UCPN (Maoist)	Ram Rijhan Yadav	4,457
Madheshi Janaadhikar Forum, Nepal	Bijay Kumar Yadav	3,964
Madheshi Janaadhikar Forum (Republican)	Manoranjan Goit	2,470
Madhesi Jana Adhikar Forum, Nepal (Democratic)	Nabin Kumar Yadav	1,958
Rastriya Prajatantra Party	Shambhu Prasad Yadav	1,840
Others		3,636
Result	Congress gain	
Source: NepalNews

=== Election in the 2000s ===
==== 2008 Constituent Assembly election ====
Party	Candidate	Votes
Madheshi Janaadhikar Forum, Nepal	Bijay Kumar Yadav	14,884
Nepali Congress	Sita Devi Yadav	10,126
CPN (Unified Marxist–Leninist)	Pramod Kumar Yadav	8,029
CPN (Maoist)	Bodhmaya Kumari Yadav	2,342
Rastriya Prajatantra Party	Bisheshwar Prasad Marwaita	2,089
CPN (United Marxist)	Chandra Dev Kamati	1,789
Terai Madhesh Loktantrik Party	Rajendra Kumar Shah	1,542
Janamorcha Nepal	Ram Rijhan Shah	1,377
Others		3,371
Invalid votes		4,075
Result	MJFN gain	
Source: Election Commission

=== Election in the 1990s ===
==== 1999 legislative elections ====
Party	Candidate	Votes
Rastriya Prajatantra Party	Krishna Charan Shrestha	14,396
Nepali Congress	Surendra Kumar Das	12,751
Samyukta Janamorcha Nepal	Ram Rijan Yadav	9,539
CPN (Unified Marxist–Leninist)	Jaya Chimire	9,012
Others		1,687
Invalid Votes		2,171
Result	RPP gain	
Source: Election Commission

==== 1994 legislative elections ====
Party	Candidate	Votes
Nepali Congress	Suresh Chandra Das	14,357
Rastriya Prajatantra Party	Krishna Charan Shrestha	9,352
CPN (Unified Marxist–Leninist)	Dharma Nath Yadav	7,597
Samyukta Janamorcha Nepal	Bishwanath Shah	4,861
CPN (United)	Ashok Kumar Singh	3,004
Nepal Sadbhawana Party	Bhogendra Thakur	1,812
Others		1,049
Result	Congress hold	
Source: Election Commission

==== 1991 legislative elections ====
Party	Candidate	Votes
Nepali Congress	Suresh Chandra Das	12,485
CPN (Unified Marxist–Leninist)	Dharma Nath Yadav	7,613
Result	Congress gain	

== See also ==
- List of parliamentary constituencies of Nepal
