= Pramod Kumar Yadav (Siraha politician) =

Nepali politician

Honourable Pramod Kumar Yadav
- प्रमोद कुमार यादव

Minister for Law, Justice and Parliamentary Affairs of Madhesh Province
- Incumbent
- Assumed office 20 November 2021
- Governor: Hari Shankar Mishra
- Chief minister: Lalbabu Raut
- Preceded by: Office created

Member of Provincial Assembly of Madhesh Province
- Incumbent
- Assumed office 2017
- Constituency: Siraha 3(B)

Personal details
- Born: Siraha, Province No. 2, Nepal
- Party: CPN (Unified Socialist)
- Website: moljpa.p2.gov.np

Pramod Kumar Yadav is a Nepalese politician belonging to CPN (Unified Socialist). He is the incumbent minister of Madhesh Province government. He is member of Provincial Assembly of Madhesh Province.

== Political career ==
Yadav left CPN (UML) to join the CPN (Unified Socialist) led by former Prime Minister Madhav Kumar Nepal.

Yadav helf Lila Nath Shrestha though both Yadav and Shrestha were elected from same constituency (Siraha 3) from CPN (UML) ticket.

== Electoral history ==
Siraha 3(B)
Party	Candidate	Votes
CPN (Unified Marxist–Leninist)	Pramod Kumar Yadav	11,954
Nepali Congress	Subhash Chandra Yadav	9,586
Federal Socialist Forum, Nepal	Manoranjan Goit	8,268
Others		587
Invalid votes		1,190
Result	CPN (UML) gain	
Source: Election Commission

== See also ==
- Ram Chandra Jha
- Lalbabu Raut ministry
- CPN (Unified Socialist)
- Satrudhan Mahato
- Ram Saroj Yadav
