= Manju Kumari Yadav (Sonama Rural Municipality) =

Nepalese politician

Honourable Manju Kumari Yadav
- मन्जु कुमारी यादव

Province Assembly Member of Madhesh Province
- Incumbent
- Assumed office 2017
- Preceded by: N/A
- Constituency: Proportional list

Personal details
- Born: October 1, 1976 (age 49)
- Party: Nepali Congress
- Occupation: Politician

Manju Kumari Yadav (Nepali: मन्जु कुमारी यादव) is a Nepalese politician. She is a member of Provincial Assembly of Madhesh Province from Nepali Congress. Yadav is a resident of Balwa Municipality, Mahottari.
