= Ram Ashish Yadav =

Nepalese politician

Honourable Ram Ashish Yadav
- राम अशिष यादव

Province Assembly Member of Madhesh Province
- Incumbent
- Assumed office 2017
- Preceded by: N/A
- Constituency: Dhanusha 2 (constituency)

Personal details
- Born: March 28, 1970 (age 56)
- Party: People's Socialist Party, Nepal
- Occupation: Politician

Ram Ashish Yadav (Nepali: राम अशिष यादव) is a Nepalese politician. He is a member of Provincial Assembly of Madhesh Province from People's Socialist Party, Nepal. Yadav, a resident of Janakpur, was elected via 2017 Nepalese provincial elections from Dhanusha 2(B).

== Electoral history ==
=== 2017 Nepalese provincial elections ===
Party	Candidate	Votes
Federal Socialist Forum, Nepal	Ram Ashish Yadav	17,132
CPN (Unified Marxist–Leninist)	Ram Chandra Mandal	9,489
Nepali Congress	Rajdev Yadav	7,164
Others		847
Invalid votes		1,391
Result	FSFN gain	
Source: Election Commission
