= Nepal Federal Socialist Party =

Political party in Nepal

Nepal Federal Socialist Party नेपाल संघीय समाजवादी पार्टी Nepāla Saṅghīya Samājavādī Pārṭī
- Abbreviation: NFSP नेसंस पार्टी
- Chairperson: Rizwan Ansari
- Founded: 17 December 2016 (9 years ago)
- Split from: Federal Socialist Forum, Nepal
- Headquarters: Babarmahal Kathmandu
- Ideology: Socialism; Dalit rights Minority rights Ethnic federalism
- Political position: Centre-left
- Seats in Madhesh Provincial Assembly: 1 / 107

Election symbol
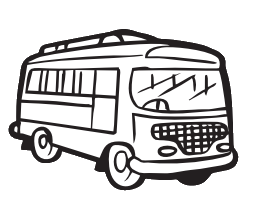

Party flag
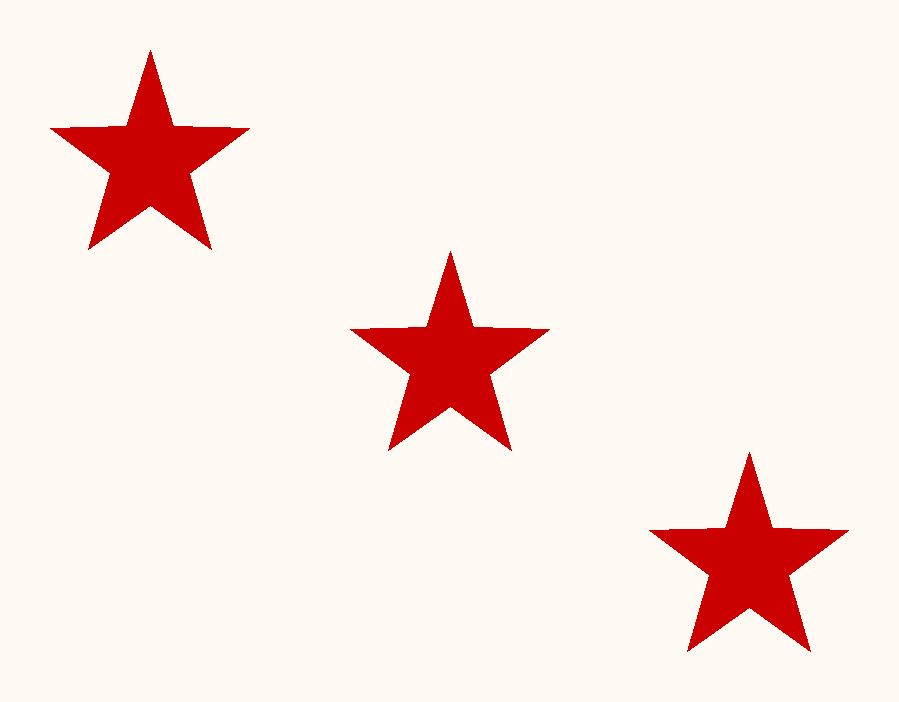

Website
- nepalnfsp.org

The Nepal Federal Socialist Party (Nepali: नेपाल संघीय समाजवादी पार्टी; abbreviated NFSP, नेसंस पार्टी) is a political party in Nepal. The party was formed on 17 December 2016 by Mohammad Rizwan Ansari.

== History ==
=== Background ===
Mohammad Rizwan Ansari was a member of the Federal Socialist Party that was founded by Ashok Kumar Rai after breaking away from the Communist Party of Nepal (Unified Marxist-Leninist). Federal Socialist Party eventually merged with Madhesi Jana Adhikar Forum, Nepal led by Upendra Yadav and Khas Samabesi Party to form Federal Socialist Forum, Nepal. Ansari eventually broke away from the party on 4 February 2016 to form Sanghiya Nava Bichar Samuha (Federal New Thought Group). Federal New Thought Group became Nepal Federal Socialist Party on 17 December 2016. On 10 October 2017, 11 parties including Samyukta Jatiya Mukti Morcha, Mulbasi Mukti Party, Rastriya Samukti Party, Kirat Janbadi Workers Party, Nepal Shramik Shakti Party, Social Democratic Party, Bahujan Shakti Party, Rastriya Janbikas Party, Dalit Muslim Shramik Party, Dalit Adhikar Abhiyan, Gandaki, Dhaulagiri, Lumbini and Samyukta Dalit Adhikar Manch merged with the party.

=== Elections ===
In the 2017 legislative and provincial elections, the party won one seat to the Provincial Assembly of Province No. 2 through proportional representation.

== Electoral performance ==
Election	Leader	Votes			Seats	Position	Resulting government
Election	Leader	#	%	±	#	Position	Resulting government
2017	Mohammad Rizwan Ansari	36,015	0.38		0 / 275	13th	Extra Parliamentary
2022	Mohammad Rizwan Ansari	41,830	0.40	▲0.02	0 / 275	▼15th	Extra Parliamentary
2026	Mohammad Rizwan Ansari	29,436	0.27	▼0.13	0 / 275	▲14th	Extra Parliamentary

== Presence in various provinces ==
Province	Seats	Year of election
Madhesh	1 / 107	2022

== See also ==
- Federal Socialist Forum, Nepal
