= Samsi Rural Municipality =

Samsi साम्सी
- Rural Municipality
- Location in Nepal
- Coordinates: 26.80°N 85.71°E
- Country: Nepal
- Development Region: Central
- District: Mahottari District
- Province: Province No. 2
- Established: 2016 A.D. (2073 B.S.)

Area
  - Total: 21.57 km^{2} (8.33 sq mi)

Population (2011)
  - Total: 33,791
  - Density: 1,567/km^{2} (4,057/sq mi)
  - Religions: Hindu Muslim Christian

Languages
  - Local: Maithili, Tharu, Nepali
- Time zone: UTC+5:45 (NST)
- Postal Code: 45700
- Area code: 044
- Website: https://samsimun.gov.np/

Samsi (Nepali: साम्सी) is a rural municipality in Mahottari District in Province No. 2 of Nepal. Official website https://samsimun.gov.np/ Established in 2016, it is divided into 7 sections (wards) from previous 7 former VDCs. It occupies an area of 21.57 km^{2} with a total population of 33,791.
