= Chandeshwor Jha =

Nepali politician

Personal details
- Born: 1953 (age 72–73)
- Party: Independent

Chandeshwor Jha (Nepali: चण्डेश्वर झा) (born 1953) is a Nepali politician from Mohattori. He is a permanent resident of Jaleshwor Municipality Ward 7.

In the 2013 Constituent Assembly election he was elected from the Mohattori-4 constituency as an independent candidate. He was also unanimously elected as the chairman of the development committee of the local campus Jaleshwor, Mohattori.

Jha proposed the utilization of Rs 5 million, provided by the Local Development Ministry for the construction of a 900-metre road in his village. The villagers had unanimously elected him as the Chairman of the Road Consumer Committee. He was also a member of the 49-member panel formed to draft CA regulations. The committee had to establish other necessary subcommittees to carry out tasks related to constitution drafting, management of CA meetings, and drafting regulations and policies required to perform other work in line with Article 78 of the Interim Constitution-2007.

Jha joined the madhesi movement with other madhesi political parties for equal rights for the Madhesi people. He joined the Rastriya Janata Party Nepal on 1 September 2017.
