= Lakshminiya Rural Municipality =

Laxminiya लक्ष्मीनिया
- Rural Municipality
- Rural Municipality in Nepal
- Location in Nepal
- Coordinates: 26.87°N 86.92°E
- Country: Nepal
- Development Region: Central
- Zone: Janakpur
- District: Dhanusha
- Province: Madhesh

Government
  - Type: Mayor-council
  - Chairperson: Bhogendra Mishra (NC)
  - Deputy Chairperson: Phulkumari Yadav (NC)

Area
  - Total: 30.66 km^{2} (11.84 sq mi)

Population (2011)
  - Total: 28,251
  - Density: 921.4/km^{2} (2,386/sq mi)
  - Religions: Hindu Muslim Christian

Languages
  - Local: Maithili, Nepali
- Time zone: UTC+5:45 (NST)
- Postal Code: 45600
- Area code: 041
- Website: www.laxminiyamun.gov.np

Laxminiya (Nepali: लक्ष्मीनिया ) is a rural municipality in Dhanusha District in Province No. 2 of Nepal. It was formed in 2016 occupying current 7 sections (wards) from previous 7 VDCs. It occupies an area of 30.66 km^{2} with a total population of 28,251.
