= Pramod Sah =

Nepalese politician

- प्रमोद साह

Member of Parliament, Pratinidhi Sabha
- In office 4 March 2018 – 2022
- Preceded by: Shambhu Lal Shrestha
- Constituency: Sarlahi 1

Personal details
- Born: 23 December 1978 (age 47)
- Party: People's Socialist Party
- Other political affiliations: Nepal Sadbhawana Party; RJPN

Pramod Sah is a Nepalese politician, belonging to the People's Socialist Party, Nepal formerly serving as the member of the 1st Federal Parliament of Nepal. In the 2017 Nepalese general election he was elected from the Sarlahi 1 constituency, securing 22036 (33.79%) votes.

== Controversies ==
- In 2019 Sah was arrested from Tribhuvan International Airport for vandalising Buddha Air's counter in Janakpur. He was protesting against Buddha Air for his concern over the health a kidney patient, his co-passenger.
