= Manoj (disambiguation) =

Manoj is a name of Indian origin.

Manoj may also refer to:

- Manoj, one-half of the Indian musical duo Manoj–Gyan
- Manoj-Babli honour killing case, a 2007 Indian court case
- Manoj Comics, an Indian comic book house
