= Madhesh Provincial Assembly =

Legislative body in Nepal

Madhesh Provincial Assembly मधेश प्रदेश सभा
- 2nd Madhesh Provincial Assembly

Type
- Type: Unicameral legislature of Madhesh Province

History
- Founded: 2018
- New session started: 2 January 2023

Leadership
- Speaker: Ram Ashish Yadav, PSP-N since 21 December 2025
- Deputy Speaker: Babita Devi Raut, Janamat
- Leader of the House (Chief Minister): Krishna Prasad Yadav, Nepali Congress since 7 December 2025
- Leader of Opposition: Saroj Kumar Yadav, PSP-N since 7 December 2025

Structure
- Political groups: Government (62): Congress: 22; CPN (UML): 24; NCP: 15; NFSP : 1; Opposition (41): PSP-N: 28; Janamat: 12; RPP: 1; Vacant (1): Vacant: 4
- Length of term: 5 years

Elections
- Voting system: Parallel voting: 64 seats – FPTP; 43 seats – PR
- First election: 2017
- Last election: 20 November 2022
- Next election: 2027

Meeting place
- District Education Office, Janakpur, Dhanusha District

Website
- pga.p2.gov.np

Constitution
- Constitution of Nepal

The Madhesh Provincial Assembly (Nepali/Maithili/Bhojpuri: मधेश प्रदेश सभा) is a unicameral governing and law making body of Madhesh Province, one of the seven Provinces in Nepal, The assembly is seated in the provincial capital at Janakpur in Dhanusha District. The assembly has 107 members, 64 of whom are elected through single-member constituencies and 43 of whom are elected through the party list proportional representation system. They are elected for five-year terms unless the assembly is dissolved earlier.

== History ==
Provincial assemblies were established in 2015 in accordance with the Constitution of Nepal. The first elections to the assemblies were held in 2017. The inaugural meeting of the assembly was held on 4 February 2018. Saroj Kumar Yadav from RJPN served as the first speaker of the assembly. Lalbabu Raut of FSFN, later Samajbadi Party and PSP-N, was elected as chief minister with support from RJPN.

The province was previously known as Province No. 2 and Janakpur served as the temporary capital of the province. The 17 January 2022 session of the assembly endorsed a proposal to name the province Madhesh and designated Janakpur as the permanent provincial capital with two-thirds majority.

== List of assemblies ==
Election Year	Assembly	Start of term	End of term	Speaker	Chief Minister	Party
2017	1st Assembly	4 February 2018	September 2022	Saroj Kumar Yadav	Lalbabu Raut (Cabinet)	People's Socialist Party, Nepal
2022	2nd Assembly	2 January 2023	Incumbent	Ram Chandra Mandal	Saroj Kumar Yadav (Cabinet)	People's Socialist Party, Nepal
2022	2nd Assembly	2 January 2023	Incumbent	Ram Chandra Mandal	Satish Kumar Singh (Cabinet)	Janamat Party
2022	2nd Assembly	2 January 2023	Incumbent	Ram Chandra Mandal	Jitendra Prasad Sonal (Cabinet)	Loktantrik Samajwadi Party, Nepal
2022	2nd Assembly	2 January 2023	Incumbent		Saroj Kumar Yadav (Cabinet)	CPN (UML)

== Political parties ==
Party	Parliamentary party leader	Seats
CPN (UML)	Saroj Kumar Yadav	22
Nepali Congress	Krishna Prasad Yadav	22
People's Socialist Party, Nepal	Saroj Kumar Yadav	19
Nepali Communist Party	Bharat Prasad Shah	16
Janamat Party	Mahesh Prasad Yadav	11
Loktantrik Samajwadi Party	Abhiram Sharma	9
Janaswaraj Party	Satish Kumar Singh	2
Rastriya Prajatantra Party		1
Nepal Federal Socialist Party		1
Nagrik Unmukti Party		1
Total		107

== See also ==
- Madhesh Province
- Provincial assemblies of Nepal
