= Tapeshwar Yadav =

Nepalese politician and civil engineer

Honourable Tapeshwar Yadav

Member of the House of Representatives
- Incumbent
- Assumed office 26 March 2026
- Preceded by: Birendra Prasad Mahato
- Constituency: Siraha 4

Personal details
- Born: 28 January 1993 (age 33) Naraha, Siraha District, Madhesh Province
- Party: Rastriya Swatantra Party
- Parent: Satya Narayan Yadav (father)
- Profession: Politician; Civil engineer

Tapeshwar Yadav (Nepali: तपेश्वर यादव) is a Nepalese politician, civil engineer and currently a member of Pratinidhi Sabha from Rastriya Swatantra Party.

He joined the Rastriya Swatantra Party since its formation and is currently serving as the province president of Madhesh. In the 2026 general election, he won from Siraha 4 with 36,210 votes, defeating Ajay Shankar Nayak, former minister of the Nepali Communist Party, Birendra Prasad Mahato, former minister and seating MP of the Janamat Party, Dharmanath Prasad Sah, former minister from CPN (Unified Marxist–Leninist), Raj Kishor Yadav, former minister of the People's Socialist Party, Nepal, and Biswendra Paswan, former minister of Bahujan Shakti Party.

== Early life ==
Yadav was born in Naraha, Siraha District on 28 January 1993 in a Maithil Yadav family.Yadav completed his Civil engineering degree from Tribhuvan University, Nepal.

== Professional Career ==
He worked as a civil engineer in Mirchaiya Municipality, Office of the Municipal Executive, for 2 years under contract. He is also president of the Madhesh Province Engineering Association.

== Electoral performance ==
Election	Year	Constituency	Contested for	Political party	Result	Votes	% of votes
Nepal general election	2026	Siraha 4	Pratinidhi Sabha member	Rastriya Swatantra Party	Won	36,210	57.32%
