= Rajdhoves =

Ethnic group of Nepal

Rajdhov or Rajdhob
- Abbreviation: RD
- Classification: Other Pure Castes
- Veda: Rigveda
- Devak: Lakhai Baba
- Religions: Hinduism
- Languages: Hindi and Maithili
- Country: Nepal and India
- Populated states: Supaul and Saptari
- Region: Bihar of India and Province No. 2 of Nepal
- Ethnicity: Madhesi
- Population: 17000+
- Victory weapon: Bow and Arrow
- Endogamous: Monogamy by marriage
- Notable members: C. K. Raut
- Status: Indigenous
- Website: www.apankataiya.com www.facebook.com/groups/166701086777926

Rajdhob or Rajdhov is an indigenous group of people based mainly in Terai of Nepal. In general, they are categorized as Madhesi.

== Demography ==
The total Rajdhob population in Nepal is estimated to be 15,391 among them 7,849 males and 7,542 females. Saptari district of Madhesh Province has 13,423 Rajdhob people which is the highest of all.

=== Surnames ===
1. Mandal/Madar (Nepali: मण्डल/मड़र) (Note: The surname Mandal has been used by other castes like Dhanuk, Khatbe, Mahishya, Gangai, Kewat and even Kayastha in Nepal and India respectively. Bengali uses Mondal instead Mandal.)
2. Khadga (Nepali: खड्गा)
3. Raut (Nepali: राउत)
4. Majhi (Nepali: माझी)
5. Singh
6. Adhikari (Nepali: अधिकारी)
7. Das (Nepali: दास)
8. Laugi (Nepali: लौगी)
9. Sant (Nepali: संत)
10. Ishar (Nepali: ईसर)
11. Kapair (Nepali: कापैर)
12. Bishwas (Nepali: विश्वास)
13. Pramani (Nepali: प्रमाणी)
14. Paik (Nepali: पाईक)
15. Parihast (Nepali: परिहस्त)
16. Padey (Nepali: पाड़े)
17. Paikra (Nepali: पैकरा)
18. Gami (Nepali: गामी)

=== Inclusiveness ===
As of 18 December 2019, only three of total Rajdhoves are in Nepal Army.

=== Language ===
Mainly they speak Maithili and Angika. Nepali, Bhojpuri, Hindi and English are the preferable secondary language.

== Events ==
1. Honour programme of Satya Narayan Mandal in DDC, Saptari meeting hall, Rajbiraj was organized by the Rajdhob Federation India/Nepal on 16 December 2017. This is the honorific moment after his win in the election of Provincial Assembly of Province No. 2.

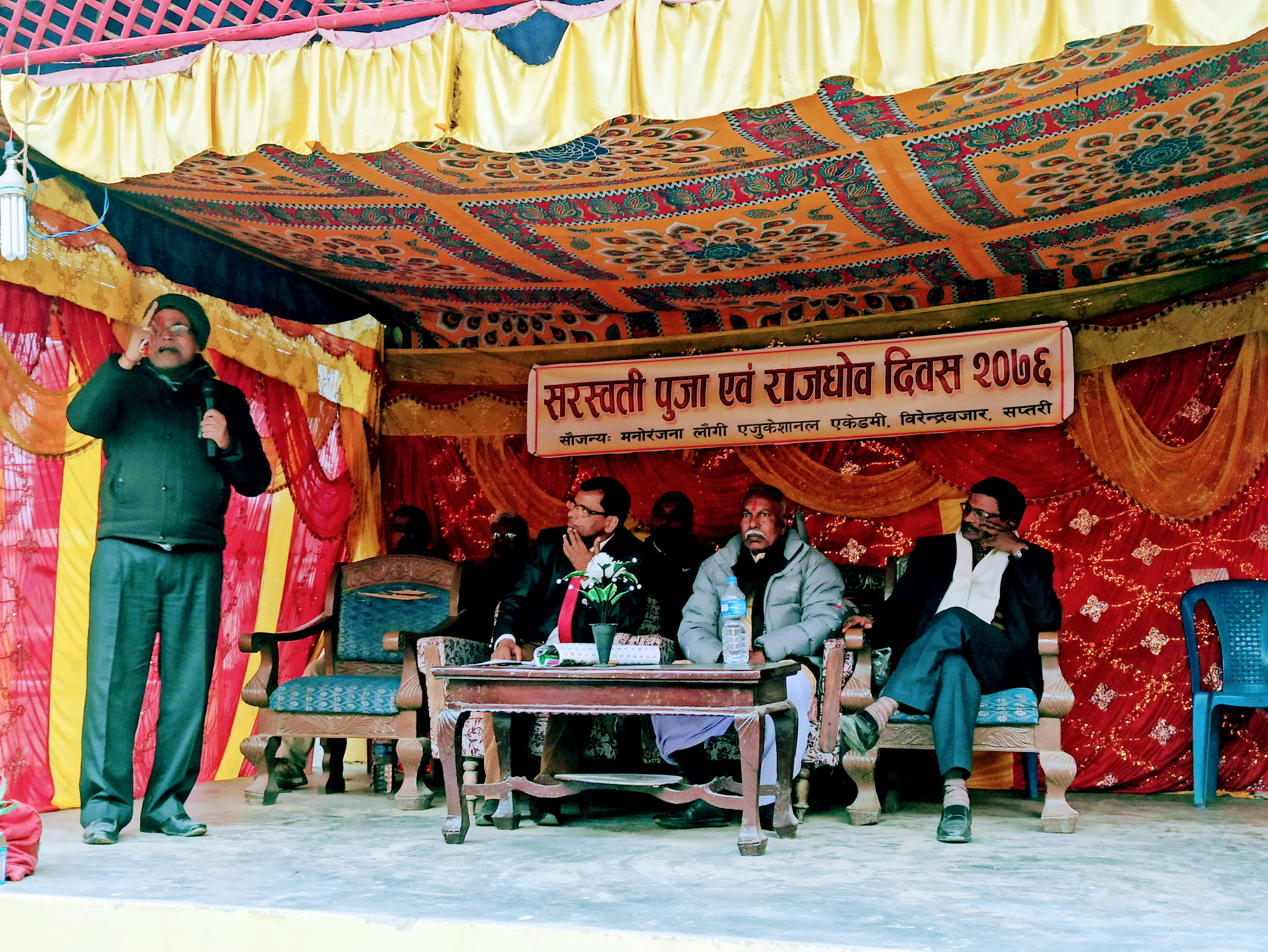
Rajdhov Diwas Programme

2. Rajdhov Diwas: Rajdhov people organize a meeting day every year on the day of Saraswati Puja. They spend some time together and discuss the issues for the upliftment of Rajdhoves.

== Poem ==
मैन्जनी, देबानगिरी करैत आबि रहल मडरजी,
संगमे राउत, माझी, खडगा, अधिकारी

ईशर, कापैर, गामी स विचारैत पैकराजी,
सन्त, दास, बिश्वास साथ लौगी करे लौगीदारी

पाँडे, पाइक, परिहस्त, प्रमाणी बाँकी,
नाबोल भेल पैरा, १८ मे एक पद्वविधारी

            -Yugal Kishor Rajdhov

== Notable persons ==
1. Birendra Majhi - Mayor of Hanumannagar Kankalini Municipality, Saptari district
2. Satya Narayan Mandal – CPNUML leader, former youth and sports minister of Nepal and first minister from Rajdhoves.
3. CK Raut - President of Janamat Party Nepal
4. Prakash Mani Raut - National President of Backward Castes Association, Nepal
5. Sameer Satyarth - Director at Raidonnews Media Group
