= Saptari 1 =

Parliamentary constituency in Madhesh Province, Nepal

- Parliamentary constituency
- The map of Saptari 1 constituency in Saptari district

- The map of Saptari 1(A) and Saptari 1(B) provincial constituency in Saptari
- Province: Madhesh Province
- District: Saptari District
- Population: 190,440 (2021)
- Electorate: 119,043 (21 November 2025)
- Major settlements: Saptakoshi Rural Municipality; Agnisair Krishna Savaran Rural Municipality; Tirhut Rural Municipality; Kanchanrup Municipality; Hanumannagar Kankalini Municipality

Current constituency
- Created: 1991
- Party: RSP
- Member of Parliament: Pushpa Kumari Chaudhary
- MPA 1(A): Raj Kumar Lekhi CPN UML
- MPA 1(B): Sakil Miya; Janamat

Saptari 1 is one of four parliamentary constituencies of Saptari District in Nepal. This constituency came into existence on the Constituency Delimitation Commission (CDC) report submitted on 31 August 2017.In 2026, Pushpa Kumari Chaudhary of Rastriya Swatantra Party won the parliamentary election from this constituency.

== Incorporated areas ==
Saptari 1 incorporates Saptakoshi Rural Municipality, Agnisair Krishna Savaran Rural Municipality, Tirhut Rural Municipality, Kanchanrup Municipality and Hanumannagar Kanalini Municipality.

== Assembly segments ==
It encompasses the following Provincial Assembly of Madhesh Province segment

- Saptari 1(A)
- Saptari 1(B)

== Members of Parliament ==
=== Parliament/Constituent Assembly ===
Election	Member	Party
1991	Hira Lal Chaudhary	CPN (Unified Marxist–Leninist)
1994	Jay Prakash Anand	Nepali Congress
2008	Hem Raj Tated	Madhesi Jana Adhikar Forum, Nepal
June 2009	Hem Raj Tated	Madhesi Jana Adhikar Forum, Nepal (Democratic)
2013	Manpur Chaudhary	UCPN (Maoist)
April 2016	Manpur Chaudhary	CPN (Maoist Centre)
2017	Dr. Surya Narayan Yadav	Federal Socialist Forum, Nepal
May 2019	Dr. Surya Narayan Yadav	Samajbadi Party, Nepal
April 2020	Dr. Surya Narayan Yadav	People's Socialist Party, Nepal
2022	Nawal Kishor Sah	People's Socialist Party, Nepal
May 2024	Nawal Kishor Sah	People's Socialist Party, Nepal
2026	Pushpa Kumari Chaudhary	Rastriya Swatantra Party

=== Provincial Assembly ===
==== 1(A) ====
Election	Member	Party
2017	Satya Narayan Mandal	CPN (Unified Marxist-Leninist)
May 2018	Satya Narayan Mandal	Nepal Communist Party
2022	Raj Kumar Lekhi	CPN (Unified Marxist-Leninist)

==== 1(B) ====
Election	Member	Party
2017	Nawal Kishore Sah Sudi	Rastriya Janata Party Nepal
April 2020	Nawal Kishore Sah Sudi	People's Socialist Party, Nepal
2022	Sakil Miya	Janamat Party

== Election results ==
=== Election in the 2020s ===
==== 2026 general election ====
Candidate	Party	Votes	%
Pushpa Kumari Chaudhary	Rastriya Swatantra Party	38,195	53.55
Sumit Kumar Sah	Swabhiman Party	7,847	11.00
Suman Raj Pyakurel	CPN (UML)	7,652	10.73
Ramdev Sah	Nepali Congress	6,994	9.81
Others		10,635	14.91
Total		71,323	100.00
Valid votes		71,323	93.69
Invalid/blank votes		4,801	6.31
Total votes		76,124	100.00
Registered voters/turnout		119,043	63.95
Majority		30,348	
Rastriya Swatantra Party gain			
Source: Kantipur, GorkhaPatra

==== 2022 general election ====
Candidate	Party	Votes	%
Nawal Kishor Sah	People's Socialist Party, Nepal	23,604	33.61
Jay Kant Raut	Janamat Party	19,996	28.47
Ramdev Sah (Teli)	Nepali Congress	14,312	20.38
Chandra Narayan Yadav	Independent	2,881	4.10
Ashok Kumar Mandal	Independent	2,345	3.34
Rohit Kumar Pokharel	Independent	1,536	2.19
Tika Laxmi Chaudhary	Nagrik Unmukti Party	1,378	1.96
Bishnu Dev Yadav	Rastriya Prajatantra Party	1,117	1.59
Niranjan Prasad Kushwaha	Rastriya Swatantra Party	1,054	1.50
Others		2,012	2.86
Total		70,235	100.00
Majority		3,608	
People's Socialist Party, Nepal hold			
Source: Election Commission

==== 2022 Nepalese provincial elections ====
===== 1(A) =====
Party	Candidate	Votes
CPN (Unified Marxist–Leninist)	Raj Kumar Lekhi	14,291
Janamat Party	Shiv Nandan Mahato	9,093
Communist Party of Nepal (Maoist Centre)	Bechan Prasad Chaudhary Tharu	7,543
Others		6,382
Result	CPN (UML) hold	
Source:Election Commission:

===== 1(B) =====
Party	Candidate	Votes
Janamat Party	Sakil Miya	16,155
People's Socialist Party, Nepal	Sudambar Yadav	9,888
Nepali Congress	Badri Narayan Mahatman Yadav	6,610
Others		1651
Result	Janamat gain	
Source:Election Commission

=== Election in the 2010s ===
==== 2017 general election ====
Party	Candidate	Votes
Federal Socialist Forum, Nepal	Dr. Surya Narayan Yadav	21,712
CPN (Maoist Centre)	Ashok Kumar Mandal	18,225
Nepali Congress	Ramdev Sah Teli	15,225
Naya Shakti Party, Nepal	Krishna Kumar Gupta	1,163
Others		1,983
Invalid votes		5,940
Result	FSFN gain	
Source: Election Commission

==== 2017 Nepalese provincial elections ====
===== 1(A) =====
Party	Candidate	Votes
CPN (Unified Marxist–Leninist)	Satya Narayan Mandal	11,302
Rastriya Janata Party Nepal	Raj Kumar Lekhi	9,252
Nepali Congress	Subodh Kumar Pokharel	8,705
Naya Shakti Party Nepal	Ashok Kumar Chaudhary	1,618
Others		816
Invalid votes		1,963
Result	CPN (UML) gain	
Source: Election Commission

===== 1(B) =====
Party	Candidate	Votes
Rastriya Janata Party Nepal	Nawal Kishore Sah Sudi	13,647
Nepali Congress	Badri Narayan Mahatman Yadav	6,333
Communist Party of Nepal (Maoist Centre)	Sakil Ali Miya	6,257
Others		879
Invalid votes		3,301
Result	RJPN gain	
Source: Election Commission

==== 2013 Constituent Assembly election ====
Party	Candidate	Votes
UCPN (Maoist)	Manpur Chaudhary	9,844
CPN (Unified Marxist–Leninist)	Suman Raj Pyakurel	8,242
Madhesi Jana Adhikar Forum, Nepal (Democratic)	Hem Raj Tated	5,549
Madhesi Jana Adhikar Forum, Nepal	Surya Nath Prasad Yadav	4,085
Nepali Congress	Laxmi Kumari Giri	2,255
Rastriya Madhesh Samajbadi Party	Mohammad Kalim Miya	1,931
Dalit Janajati Party	Kusheshwar Sah Haluwai	1,172
Terai Madhesh Sadbhavna Party	Shatrudhan Prasad Rauniyar	1,111
Others		5,926
Result	Maoist gain	
Source: NepalNews

=== Election in the 2000s ===
==== 2008 Constituent Assembly election ====
Party	Candidate	Votes
Madhesi Jana Adhikar Forum, Nepal	Hem Raj Tated	9,879
CPN (Maoist)	Surya Nath Prasad Yadav	8,824
Independent	Manpur Chaudhary	7,637
CPN (Unified Marxist–Leninist)	Suman Raj Pyakurel	6,696
Janamorcha Nepal	Asarfi Sada	3,288
Nepali Congress	Shrawan Kumar Bista	3,027
Terai Madhesh Loktantrik Party	Lalan Chaudhary Tharu	2,146
Nepal Loktantrik Samajbadi Dal	Dev Narayan Chaudhary	1,460
Others		5,294
Invalid votes		4,799
Result	MJFN gain	
Source: Election Commission

=== Election in the 1990s ===
==== 1999 legislative elections ====
Party	Candidate	Votes
Nepali Congress	Jay Prakash Anand	15,083
CPN (Unified Marxist–Leninist)	Hira Lal Chaudhary	13,853
Nepal Sadbhawana Party	Mamata Jha	7,178
CPN (Marxist–Leninist)	Jagadish Prasad Yadav	5,820
Independent	Shrawan Kumar Bista	3,793
Rastriya Prajatantra Party	Guru Sharan Rohita	2,476
Others		1,385
Invalid Votes		1,899
Result	Congress hold	
Source: Election Commission

==== 1994 legislative elections ====
Party	Candidate	Votes
Nepali Congress	Jay Prakash Anand	18,006
CPN (Unified Marxist–Leninist)	Hira Lal Chaudhary	13,885
Rastriya Prajatantra Party	Devendra Jha	6,200
Nepal Sadbhawana Party	Muralidhar Yadav	3,204
Others		1,687
Result	Congress gain	
Source: Election Commission

==== 1991 legislative elections ====
Party	Candidate	Votes
CPN (Unified Marxist–Leninist)	Hira Lal Chaudhary	13,973
Nepali Congress	Jay Prakash Anand	12,050
Result	CPN (UML) gain	

== See also ==
- List of parliamentary constituencies of Nepal
