= Siraha 4 =

Parliamentary constituency in Madhesh Province, Nepal

- Parliamentary constituency
- Siraha 4 in Province No. 2
- Province: Province No. 2
- District: Siraha District

Current constituency
- Created: 1991
- Party: Rastriya Swatantra Party
- Member of Parliament: Tapeshwar Yadav

Siraha 4 is one of four parliamentary constituencies of Siraha District in Nepal. This constituency came into existence on the Constituency Delimitation Commission (CDC) report submitted on 31 August 2017.

== Incorporated areas ==
Siraha 4 incorporates Karjanha Municipality, Mirchaiya Municipality, kalyanpur Municipality, wards 3–5 of Naraha Rural Municipality and wards 2–4 of Bishnupur Rural Municipality

== Assembly segments ==
It encompasses the following Province No. 2 Provincial Assembly segment

- Siraha 4(A)
- Siraha 4(B)

== Members of Parliament ==
=== Parliament/Constituent Assembly ===
Election	Member	Party
1991	Raj Dev Goit	Independent
1994	Raj Dev Goit	Nepali Congress
1999	Hem Narayan Yadav	CPN (Unified Marxist–Leninist)
2008	Shatrudhan Prasad Singh Koiri	Madheshi Janaadhikar Forum, Nepal
June 2009	Shatrudhan Prasad Singh Koiri	Madhesi Jana Adhikar Forum, Nepal (Democratic)
2013	Ram Chandra Yadav	Nepali Congress
2017	Raj Kishor Yadav	Rastriya Janata Party Nepal
April 2020	Raj Kishor Yadav	People's Socialist Party, Nepal
2022	Birendra Prasad Mahato	People's Socialist Party, Nepal
2026	Tapeshwar Yadav	Rastriya Swatantra Party

=== Provincial Assembly ===
==== 2(A) ====
Election	Member	Party
2017	Dilip Kumar Sah	CPN (Maoist Centre)
May 2018	Dilip Kumar Sah	Nepal Communist Party

==== 2(B) ====
Election	Member	Party
2017	Suresh Kumar Mandal	Rastriya Janata Party Nepal
April 2020	Suresh Kumar Mandal	People's Socialist Party, Nepal

== Election results ==
=== Election in the 2020s ===
==== 2022 general election ====
Candidate	Party	Votes	%
Birendra Prasad Mahato	People's Socialist Party, Nepal	24,102	39.56
Birendra Prasad Sah	Janamat Party	16,294	26.75
Dharmanath Prasad Sah	CPN (Unified Socialist)	14,653	24.05
Bimal Kumar Tiwari	Rastriya Swatantra Party	1,683	2.76
Nagina Kumar Jha	Rastriya Prajatantra Party	1,073	1.76
Others		3,117	5.12
Total		60,922	100.00
Majority		7,808	
People's Socialist Party, Nepal			

=== Election in the 2010s ===
==== 2017 legislative elections ====
Party	Candidate	Votes
Rastriya Janata Party Nepal	Raj Kishor Yadav	21,144
CPN (Maoist Centre)	Ajay Shankar Nayak	17,575
Nepali Congress	Mokhtar Ahmed	10,088
CPN (Marxist–Leninist)	Ram Iqbal Yadav	2,219
Others		1,585
Invalid votes		4,744
Result	RJPN gain	
Source: Election Commission

==== 2017 Nepalese provincial elections ====
===== 2(A) =====
Party	Candidate	Votes
CPN (Maoist Centre)	Dilip Kumar Sah	11,121
Rastriya Janata Party Nepal	Ram Kumar Mandal	9,983
Nepali Congress	Kapil Dev Shah	3,788
Others		1,605
Invalid votes		1,894
Result	Maoist Centre gain	
Source: Election Commission

===== 2(B) =====
Party	Candidate	Votes
Rastriya Janata Party Nepal	Suresh Kumar Mandal	10,480
Nepali Congress	Ganesh Kumar Mandal	7,499
CPN (Unified Marxist–Leninist)	Tulsi Prasad Yadav	7,492
Others		
Invalid votes		1,791
Result	CPN (UML) gain	
Source: Election Commission

==== 2013 Constituent Assembly election ====
Party	Candidate	Votes
Nepali Congress	Ram Chandra Yadav	8,805
CPN (Unified Marxist–Leninist)	Ram Autar Yadav	8,560
Madhesi Jana Adhikar Forum, Nepal (Democratic)	Shatrudhan Prasad Singh	6,543
UCPN (Maoist)	Ram Kumar Yadav	5,679
Others		3,834
Result	Congress gain	
Source: NepalNews

=== Election in the 2000s ===
==== 2008 Constituent Assembly election ====
Party	Candidate	Votes
Madheshi Janaadhikar Forum, Nepal	Shatrudhan Prasad Singh Koiri	11,779
CPN (Unified Marxist–Leninist)	Ram Autar Yadav	8,542
Janamorcha Nepal	Ram Rijhan Yadav	6,179
Nepali Congress	Ram Dayal Yadav	5,621
Sanghiya Loktantrik Rastriya Manch	Ramnanda Chaudhary	1,709
Terai Madhesh Loktantrik Party	Krishna Bahadur Yadav	1,208
Sadbhavana Party	Ram Bahadur Mahato	1,186
CPN (Maoist)	Shyam Chandra Yadav	1,176
Others		3,591
Invalid votes		3,396
Result	MJFN gain	
Source: Election Commission

=== Election in the 1990s ===
==== 1999 legislative elections ====
Party	Candidate	Votes
CPN (Unified Marxist–Leninist)	Hem Narayan Yadav	19,235
Nepali Congress	Chandra Narayan Yadav	16,866
Rastriya Prajatantra Party	Rajdev Marwaita Yadav	11,923
Others		2,558
Invalid Votes		998
Result	CPN (UML) gain	
Source: Election Commission

==== 1994 legislative elections ====
Party	Candidate	Votes
Nepali Congress	Raj Dev Goit	11,829
Rastriya Prajatantra Party	Bisheshwar Prasad Marwaita	11,472
Nepal Sadbhawana Party	Hem Narayan Yadav	8,810
Nepal Janabadi Morcha	Ram Raja Prasad Singh	4,928
Samyukta Janamorcha Nepal	Ram Kumar Yadav	3,217
Others		758
Result	Congress gain	
Source: Election Commission

==== 1991 legislative elections ====
Party	Candidate	Votes
Independent	Raj Dev Goit	11,919
Samyukta Janamorcha Nepal	Ram Kumar Yadav	8,872
Nepali Congress	Benu Regmi	7,596
Result	Independent gain	

== See also ==
- List of parliamentary constituencies of Nepal
