= Suresh Kumar Mandal =

Nepalese politician

- सुरेश कुमार मण्डल
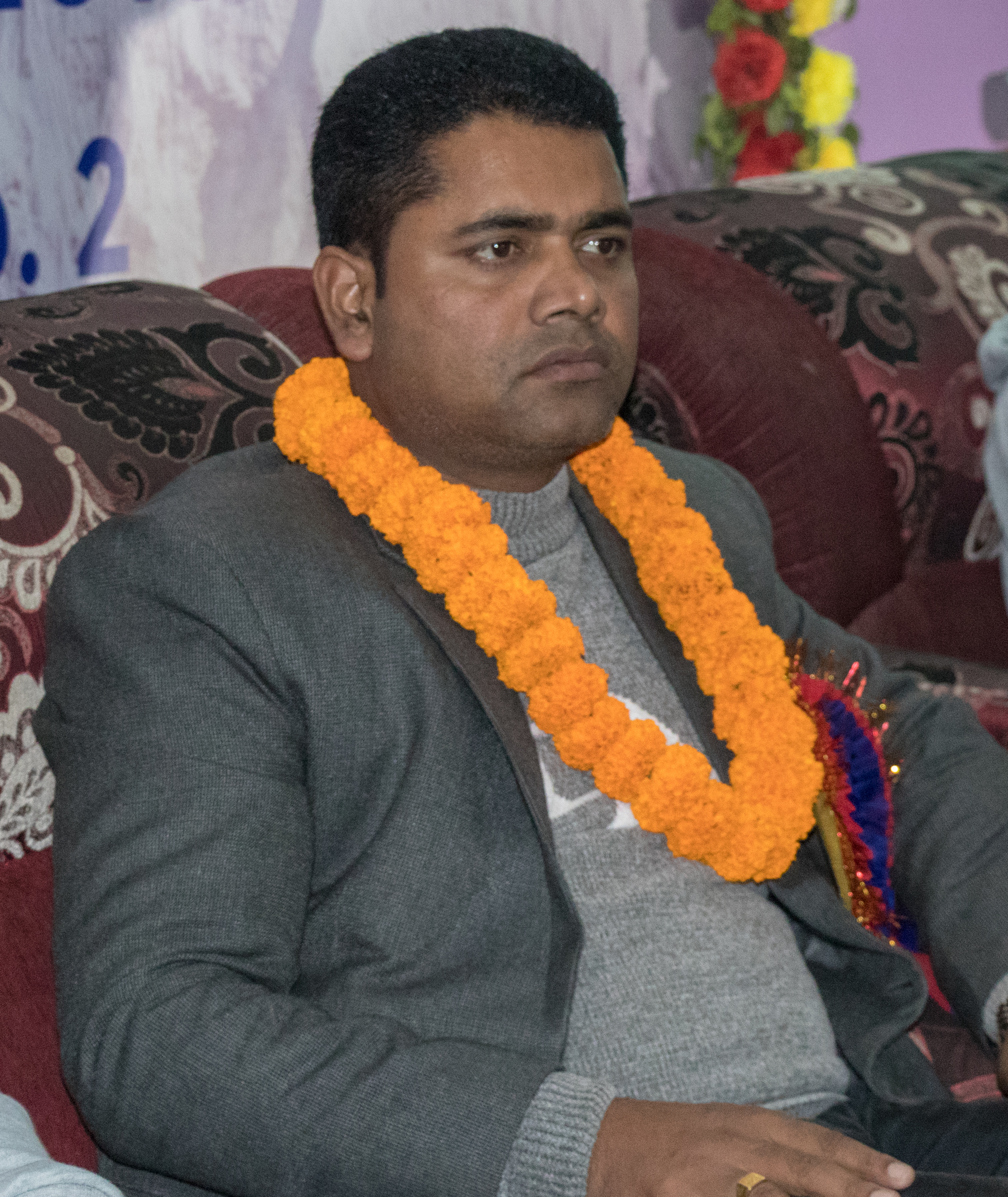
- Mandal during Wikicamp Nepal 2018

Minister of State for Industry, Tourism and Forests and Environment of Madhesh Province
- In office 25 July 2018 – 6 June 2021
- Minister: Ram Naresh Rae; Satrudhan Mahato
- Governor: Ratneshwar Lal Kayastha; Tilak Pariyar; Rajesh Jha; Hari Shankar Mishra
- Chief minister: Lalbabu Raut
- Preceded by: Assembly created
- Succeeded by: Nagendra Rae Yadav

Province Assembly Member of Madhesh Province
- In office 2017–2022
- Preceded by: N/A
- Succeeded by: Ram Babu Yadav
- Constituency: Siraha 4 (B)

Personal details
- Party: People's Socialist Party, Nepal
- Occupation: Politician

Suresh Kumar Mandal (Nepali: सुरेश कुमार मण्डल) is a Nepalese politician and former member of Provincial Assembly of Madhesh Province from People's Socialist Party, Nepal. Mandal, a resident of Kalyanpur, Siraha was elected to the 2017 provincial assembly election from Siraha 4(B).

== Electoral history ==
=== 2017 Nepalese provincial elections ===
| Party | Candidate | Votes |
|---|---|---|
| Rastriya Janata Party Nepal | Suresh Kumar Mandal | 10,480 |
| Nepali Congress | Ganesh Kumar Mandal | 7,499 |
| CPN (Unified Marxist–Leninist) | Tulsi Prasad Yadav | 7,492 |
| Others | | |
| Invalid votes | | 1,791 |
| Result | CPN (UML) gain | |
Source: Election Commission
