= Er. Basant Kushwaha =

Nepalese politician, Minister for Sports and Social Welfare (Madhesh Province)

Honourable Er. Basant Kushwaha
- ई. बसन्त कुशवाहा
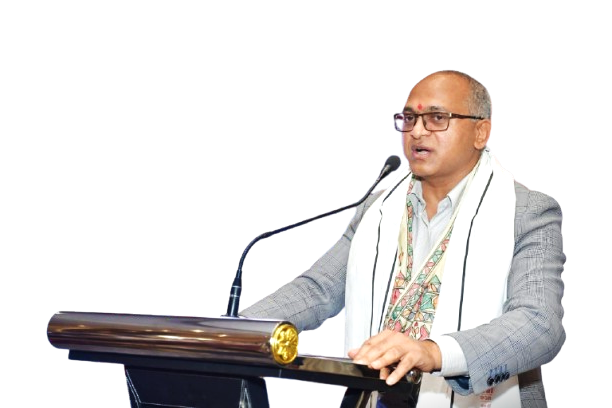
- Kushwaha in 2025

Central Senior Vice President of the Janamat Party
- In office 18 March 2019 – Incumbent
- President: C. K. Raut
- Preceded by: Office established

Minister for Sports and Social Welfare Madhesh Province
- In office 31 December 2025 – Incumbent
- Chief Minister: Krishna Prasad Yadav

Minister for Industry, Commerce and Tourism Madhesh Province
- In office 23 May 2025 – 24 September 2025
- Chief Minister: Satish Kumar Singh
- Preceded by: Sakil Ali Miya

Minister for Land Management, Agriculture and Cooperatives Madhesh Province
- In office 26 January 2023 – 29 May 2023
- Chief Minister: Saroj Kumar Yadav
- Preceded by: Govinda Bahadur Neupane

Member of the Provincial Assembly of Madhesh Province
- In office 1 January 2023 – Incumbent
- Constituency: Proportional representation (Madheshi)

Personal details
- Born: 13 October 1978 (age 47) Bankul, Rautahat District, Madhesh Province, Nepal
- Party: Janamat Party (2019–present)
- Other political affiliations: Alliance for Independent Madhesh (pre‑2019)
- Education: Bachelor of Engineering in Electrical Engineering; Master of Business Administration in Project Management
- Alma mater: Pulchowk Campus, Tribhuvan University; Ras Al Khaimah College, UAE
- Occupation: Politician, Electrical Engineer, Activist
- Profession: Engineer
- Awards: Engineer of the Year (October 2016) – Hotelier Middle East Awards; Engineering Excellence Award (December 2016) – Hyatt Hotels Corporation; Hotel Green Sustainability Award (June 2019) – Kempinski Hotels

Er. Basant Kushwaha (Nepali: ई. बसन्त कुशवाहा; born 13 October 1978) is a Nepalese politician, electrical engineer, and Madheshi rights activist. On 31 December 2025, Kushwaha was appointed Minister for Sports and Social Welfare in the Madhesh provincial government. . He has served as Central Senior Vice President of the Janamat Party since its founding in 2019 and has been a member of the Provincial Assembly of Madhesh Province since 2023.

He served as a provincial minister twice: as Minister for Industry, Commerce and Tourism (May–September 2025) and Minister for Land Management, Agriculture and Cooperatives (January–May 2023). A former UAE-based hotel engineer, he was awarded Engineer of the Year in October 2016 for energy conservation.

In October 2025, he represented Janamat in the federal tripartite dialogue with Gen-Z protesters and major parties to draft national reforms.

== Early life and education ==
Er. Basant Kushwaha was born on 13 October 1978 in Bankul village, Rautahat District, Madhesh Province. He passed the School Leaving Certificate (SLC) from Juddha Secondary School, Gaur, in 1994, topping Rautahat District.

From 1994 to 2001, he pursued a Bachelor of Engineering (BE) in Electrical Engineering at Pulchowk Campus, Tribhuvan University, graduating as campus topper. In 2014, he earned an MBA in Project Management from Ras Al Khaimah College, UAE.

== Political career ==
=== Janamat Party leadership ===
A founding member of Janamat Party (18 March 2019), he has been Central Senior Vice President since inception.

A 2025 split attempt was halted by the Supreme Court.

=== Provincial Assembly membership ===
In the 2022 Nepalese provincial elections, he was selected via proportional representation (Madheshi category) for Janamat Party.

=== Ministerial tenure ===
- Sports & Social Welfare (2025): Appointed 31 December 2025; incumbent.
- Industry & Tourism (2025): Appointed 23 May 2025; recalled 24 September 2025.
- Agriculture (2023): Appointed 26 January 2023; removed May 2023; resigned July 2023.

== Human rights advocacy ==
Kushwaha is a prominent advocate for Madheshi and minority rights in Nepal. On 30 November–1 December 2017, he delivered a statement at the 10th session of the United Nations Forum on Minority Issues in Geneva, representing the Non-Resident Madhesis Association (NRMA). Following Nepal's election to the United Nations Human Rights Council on 16 October 2017 for a three-year term beginning 1 January 2018, Kushwaha questioned how a government that fails to protect its own citizens' rights can uphold global human rights. He highlighted the lack of progress by the Truth and Reconciliation Commission, with more than 62,000 registered cases from the 1996–2006 civil war. He stated that after the 2006 civil war, the government targeted Madheshi and minority youths demanding constitutional rights, killing hundreds; dozens of extrajudicial killings were investigated and reported by OHCHR in 2010, leading to the closure of OHCHR offices in Madhesh and refusal to extend the United Nations Mission in Nepal mandate in 2011. Over 4 million youths one-third of Nepal's workforce have migrated as labourers to Gulf and East Asian countries due to repression and lack of opportunities. Kushwaha cited the case of activist C. K. Raut, arrested over 15 times, jailed for months, placed under house arrest, with his books, videos, and websites banned. Thousands of supporters were arrested, hundreds faced fake cases, and over 100 were injured by excessive force in peaceful assemblies. Raut was arrested on 2 February 2017 and tortured for 86 days after a January 2017 Martyrs’ Day rally; his properties and bank accounts were frozen. Ten supporters were arrested on 26 November 2017 during an Anti-Racism Day rally advocating the "right to reject" in elections.More than 60 people were killed during the 2015 Madhesh protests against the constitution. He urged the United Nations to enforce Nepal's obligations under 24 ratified human rights treaties, including those on civil and political rights, economic, social and cultural rights, elimination of racial discrimination, and against torture, to protect freedom of expression, movement, and peaceful assembly and prevent radicalisation of youth.

== Electoral history ==
Election	House	Constituency	Party	Result
2022	Provincial Assembly of Madhesh Province	Proportional (Madheshi)	Janamat Party	Elected

== See also ==
- Janamat Party
- Madhesh Province
