= Janat Ansari =

Nepalese politician

Honourable Janat Ansari
- जनत अन्सारी

Province Assembly Member of Madhesh Province
- Incumbent
- Assumed office 2017
- Preceded by: N/A
- Constituency: Parsa 1 (constituency)

Personal details
- Born: January 11, 1970 (age 56)
- Party: Independent
- Occupation: Politician

Janat Ansari (Nepali: जनत अन्सारी) is a Nepalese politician. He is a member of Provincial Assembly of Madhesh Province from People's Socialist Party, Nepal. Ansari, a resident of Birgunj, was elected via 2017 Nepalese provincial elections from Parsa 1(A).

== Electoral history ==
=== 2017 Nepalese provincial elections ===
Party	Candidate	Votes
Federal Socialist Forum, Nepal	Janat Ansari	8,593
Nepali Congress	Ram Narayan Prasad Kurmi	7,171
Communist Party of Nepal (Maoist Centre)	Rahabar Ansari	6,794
Others		1,211
Invalid votes		883
Result	FSFN gain	
Source: Election Commission
