= People's Socialist Party (Nepal, 2024) =

Political party in Nepal

People's Socialist Party जनता समाजवादी पार्टी
- Abbreviation: PSP
- Chairperson: Ashok Rai
- Joint chairperson: Renu Kumari Yadav
- General secretary: Mohammad Ishtiyaq Rayi
- Founded: 5 May 2024; 2 years ago
- Split from: PSP-N
- Headquarters: Gwarko, Lalitpur
- Ideology: Socialism; Federalism
- Political position: Centre-left to left-wing
- Colours
- ECN Status: Provincial Party
- Seats in Pratinidhi Sabha: 0 / 275
- Seats in Rastriya Sabha: 0 / 59
- Seats in Provincial Assemblies: 3 / 550
- Chief Ministers: 0 / 7
- Mayors/Chairs: 5 / 753
- Councillors: 500 / 35,011
- Number of provinces in government: 2 / 7

Election symbol
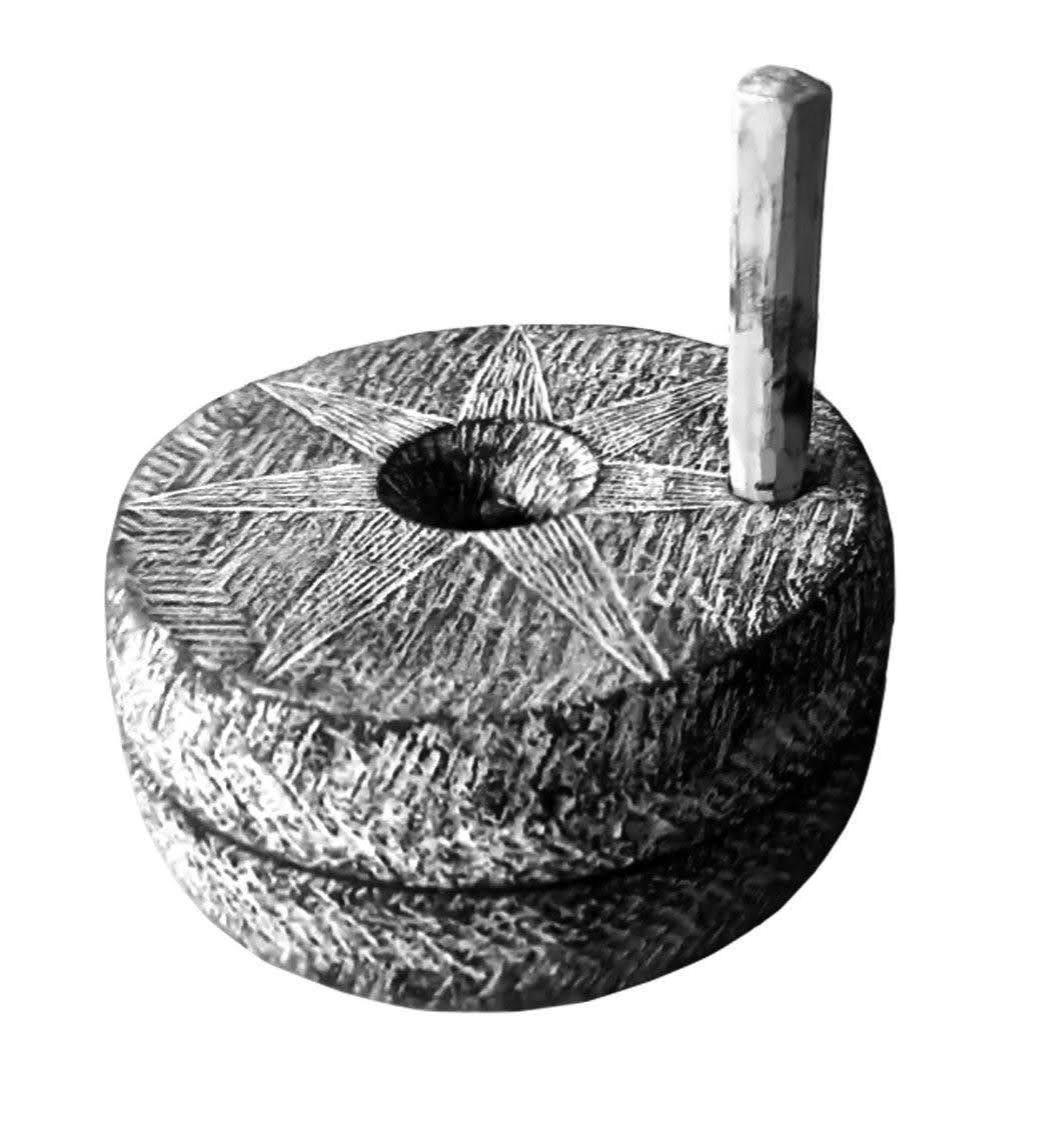

Party flag

Website
- peoplesocialist.org

The People's Socialist Party (abbr. PSP; Nepali: जनता समाजवादी पार्टी), also known as Janata Samajbadi Party, is the seventh-largest political party in Nepal. The party was formed after split in the People's Socialist Party, Nepal led by party federal council chairman Ashok Rai, supported by majority federal MPs from the PSP-N.

The party has forged alliance with Resham Lal Chaudhary formed Nagrik Unmukti Party, Nepal and Rajendra Mahato led Rastriya Mukti Party Nepal to contest election on common election symbol "janto". With 7 out of 275 seats in the lower house House of Representative, the party remained as the sixth largest political party in the Federal Parliament.

== Ideology ==
People's Socialist Party's guiding principle is Federal Socialism.The party advocates for identity based federalism and a more inclusive parliament. They also support a more decentralized government structure which guarantees more power to provincial and local governments. The party intends to implement the agreements of various movements.

== History ==
=== Formation and party expansion ===
The party was formed after a split in the mother party, People's Socialist Party, Nepal led by Upendra Yadav when a group of MPs, MLAs and central leaders alleged the party chair to be authoritarian and going against the interest of the ruling coalition government of Nepal.

The group filed an application for a party split with the Election Commission on 5 May 2023 which included MPs Ashok Rai, Nawal Kishor Sah, Hasina Khan, Ranju Kumari Jha, Pradeep Yadav, Birendra Prasad Mahato and Sushila Shrestha. The party received its recognition from the Election Commission on 6 May 2024. The party was joined by several MLAs of Koshi, Madhesh and Lumbini province.

The party forged working alliance with Rajendra Mahato led Rastriya Mukti Party as well as Mohammad Rizwan led Nepal Federal Socialist Party which would finally conclude to unification.

== Members of parliament ==
People's Socialist Party (7)
Constituency/PR group	Member	Portfolio & Responsibilities / Remarks
Sunsari 1	Ashok Rai	Parliamentary party leader
Saptari 1	Nawal Kishore Sah Sudi	
Parsa 1	Pradeep Yadav	
Siraha 4	Birendra Prasad Mahato	
Indigenous peoples	Sushila Shrestha	
Madheshi	Ranju Kumari Jha	
Muslim	Hasina Khan	

== List of cabinet ministers ==
No.	Name	Portrait	Term of office		Days in office	Ministerial incharge
Central government
1	Nawal Kishor Sah		10 March 2024	12 July 2024	124 days	Minister for Forest and Environment
1	Nawal Kishor Sah		15 July 2024	9 September 2025	1 year, 56 days	Minister for Women, Children and Senior Citizen
2	Pradeep Yadav		13 May 2024	12 July 2024	60 days	Minister for Health and Population
2	Pradeep Yadav		15 July 2024	9 September 2025	1 year, 56 days	Minister for Water Supply
Lumbini government
1	Bhandari Lal Ahir		5 April 2024	12 July 2024	98 days	Minister for Agriculture and Land Management
2	Adesh Kumar Agrawal		24 October 2024	Incumbent	1 year, 301 days	Minister for Internal Affairs and Law

== Leadership ==
SN	Portfolio	Name
1	Chairman	Ashok Rai
3	Joint chairman	Renu Kumari Yadav
4	Deputy chairman	Nawal Kishor Sah
4	Deputy chairman	Sushila Shrestha
5	General Secretary	Mohammad Ishtiyaq Rayi
6	Deputy general secretary	Pradeep Yadav
7	Secretary	Ranju Kumari Jha
8	Treasurer	Birendra Prasad Mahato

== See also ==
- Ashok Rai
- Pradeep Yadav
