= Sushila Shrestha =

Nepalese politician

Honourable Sushila Shrestha

Member of Parliament, Pratinidhi Sabha
- Incumbent
- Assumed office 2022
- Constituency: Party list

Personal details
- Party: People's Socialist Party
- Other party: People's Socialist Party
- Spouse: Ashok Rai
- Parents: Chandra Bahadur (father); Baak Kumari (mother)

Sushila Shrestha is a Nepalese politician, belonging to the People's Socialist Party. She is a member of the 2nd Federal Parliament of Nepal. In the 2022 Nepalese general election she was elected as a proportional representative from the indigenous people category.

== See also ==
- People's Socialist Party
