= Surya Narayan Yadav =

Surya Narayan Yadav may refer to:

- Surya Narayan Yadav (Nepali politician), member of the Federal Parliament (2017–2019)
- Surya Narayan Yadav (Indian politician), member of Lok Sabha (1989–1996)
