= Birendra Prasad Mahato =

Nepalese politician and Minister of Forests and Environment of Nepal

Honourable Birendra Prasad Mahato
- बिरेन्द्र प्रसाद महतो

Treasurer of People's Socialist Party
- Incumbent
- Assumed office 5 May 2024
- Preceded by: position established

Minister of Forests and Environment
- In office 24 May 2023 – 4 March 2024
- President: Ram Chandra Poudel
- Prime Minister: Pushpa Kamal Dahal
- Preceded by: Pradeep Yadav
- Succeeded by: Nawal Kishor Sah

Member of Parliament, Pratinidhi Sabha
- Incumbent
- Assumed office 22 December 2022
- Preceded by: Raj Kishor Yadav
- Constituency: Siraha 4

Personal details
- Born: 5 July 1969 (age 56)
- Party: PSP
- Spouse: Kriti Kumari Mahato
- Children: 2
- Parent: Ram Ashish Sah (father)
- Education: BSEU (PhD)

Birendra Prasad Mahato is a Nepalese politician, belonging to the People's Socialist Party currently serving as a member of the 2nd Federal Parliament of Nepal. In the 2022 Nepalese general election, he won the election from Siraha 4 (constituency). He had previously served as a member of the 2nd Constituent Assembly from the party list of Madheshi Jana Adhikar Forum.

== See also ==
- People's Socialist Party
