= Surya Narayan Yadav (Nepali politician) =

Nepalese politician

Dr. Surya Narayan Yadav
- डा. सूर्य नारायण यादव

Member of Parliament, Pratinidhi Sabha
- In office 4 March 2018 – 2022
- Preceded by: Manpur Chauhdary
- Succeeded by: Nawal Kishor Sah
- Constituency: Saptari 1

Personal details
- Born: 17 April 1958 (age 67)
- Party: People's Socialist Party
- Other political affiliations: Federal Socialist Forum

Surya Narayan Yadav is a Nepalese politician, belonging to the People's Socialist Party, Nepal who was elected as the member of the 1st Federal Parliament of Nepal. In the 2017 Nepalese general election he was elected from the Saptari 1 constituency, securing 21712 (37.24%) votes.
