= Dilip Kumar Sah =

Nepalese politician

Honorable Dilip Kumar Sah
- दिलीप कुमार साह
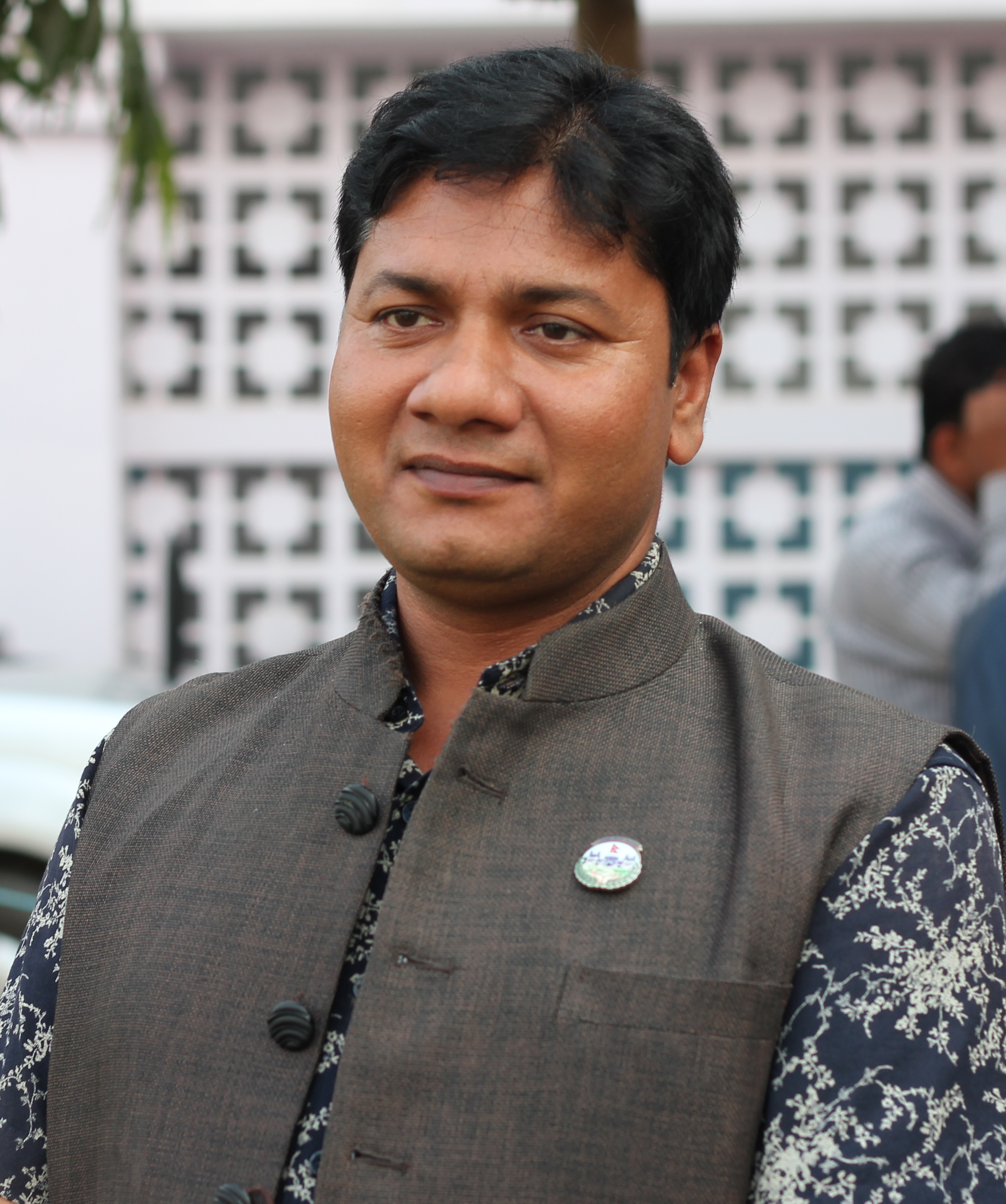
- Portrait of Sah in 2019

Member of Provincial Assembly of Madhesh Province
- Incumbent
- Assumed office 2017
- Preceded by: N/A
- Constituency: Siraha 4 (A)

Personal details
- Party: CPN (Maoist Centre)
- Occupation: Politician

Dilip Kumar Sah (Nepali: दिलीप कुमार साह) is a Nepalese politician who is elected member of Provincial Assembly of Madhesh Province from CPN (Maoist Centre). Sah, a resident of Mirchaiya, Siraha was elected to the 2017 provincial assembly election from Siraha 4(A).

== Electoral history ==
=== 2017 Nepalese provincial elections ===
Party	Candidate	Votes
CPN (Maoist Centre)	Dilip Kumar Sah	11,121
Rastriya Janata Party Nepal	Ram Kumar Mandal	9,983
Nepali Congress	Kapil Dev Shah	3,788
Others		1,605
Invalid votes		1,894
Result	Maoist Centre gain	
Source: Election Commission
