= Sonu Murmu =

Nepalese politician

Honourable Sonu Murmu

Member of Parliament, Pratinidhi Sabha for Janamat Party
- Incumbent
- Assumed office 2022

Personal details
- Party: Janamat Party
- Other party: Janamat Party
- Parents: Lakhi Ram (father); Badki (mother)

Sonu Murmu is a Nepalese politician, belonging to the Janamat Party. She is currently serving as a member of the 2nd Federal Parliament of Nepal. In the 2022 Nepalese general election she was elected as a proportional representative from the indigenous people category.
