= Sunsari 1 =

Parliamentary constituency in Province No. 1, Nepal

- Parliamentary constituency
- Sunsari 1 in Koshi Province
- Province: Koshi Province
- District: Sunsari District
- Electorate: 150,393

Current constituency
- Created: 1991
- Party: Shram Sanskriti Party
- Member of Parliament: Harka Sampang
- Member of the Provincial Assembly: Pradeep Kumar Bhandari, CPN (UML)
- Member of the Provincial Assembly: Bhim Acharya, CPN (UML)

Sunsari 1 is one of four parliamentary constituencies of Sunsari District in Nepal. This constituency came into existence on the Constituency Delimitation Commission (CDC) report submitted on 31 August 2017.

== Incorporated areas ==
Sunsari 1 incorporates Dharan Sub-metropolitan City, wards 1–5 of Barah Municipality and wards 6 and 7 of Ramdhuni Municipality

== Assembly segments ==
It encompasses the following Province No. 1 Provincial Assembly segment

- Sunsari 1(A)
- Sunsari 1(B)

== Members of Parliament ==
=== Parliament/Constituent Assembly ===
Election	Member	Party
1991	Man Mohan Adhikari	CPN (UML)
1994	Lila Shrestha Subba	CPN (UML)
1999	Kunta Sharma	CPN (UML)
2008	Kiran Kumar Rai	CPN (Maoist)
January 2009	Kiran Kumar Rai	UCPN (Maoist)
2013	Krishna Kumar Rai	CPN (UML)
2017	Jay Kumar Rai	CPN (UML)
May 2018	Jay Kumar Rai	Nepal Communist Party
2022	Ashok Rai	People's Socialist Party, Nepal
2026	Harka Sampang	Shram Sanskriti Party

=== Provincial Assembly ===
==== 1(A) ====
Election	Member	Party
2017	Pradeep Kumar Bhandari	CPN (UML)
May 2018	Pradeep Kumar Bhandari	Nepal Communist Party

==== 1(B) ====
Election	Member	Party
2017	Bhim Prasad Acharya	CPN (UML)
May 2018	Bhim Prasad Acharya	Nepal Communist Party

== Election results ==
=== Election in the 2020s ===
==== 2026 general election ====
Candidate	Party	Votes	%
Hark Raj Rai	Shram Sanskriti Party	35,741	43.07
Goma Tamang	Rastriya Swatantra Party	27,249	32.84
Tika Ram Limbu	Communist Party of Nepal (Unified Marxist–Leninist)	6,463	7.79
Surya Bahadur Bhattarai	Nepali Communist Party	6,185	7.45
Sujendra Tamang	Nepali Congress	3,970	4.78
Uddav Shrestha	Rastriya Prajatantra Party	1,419	1.71
Dambar Lawati	Ujyaalo Nepal Party	590	0.71
Others		1,365	1.64
Total		82,982	100.00
Valid votes		82,982	94.87
Invalid/blank votes		4,489	5.13
Total votes		87,471	100.00
Registered voters/turnout		150,393	58.16
Majority		8,492	
Shram Sanskriti Party gain			

==== 2022 general election ====
Candidate	Party	Votes	%
Ashok Rai	People's Socialist Party, Nepal	17,059	23.36
Goma Tamang	Rastriya Swatantra Party	16,606	22.74
Muksamhang Subba	CPN (Maoist Centre)	13,087	17.92
Ashok Kumar Rai	Rastriya Prajatantra Party	7,884	10.80
Manoj Kumar Myangbo	Independent	7,812	10.70
Tarka Bahadur Magar	Independent	3,818	5.23
Kumar Karki	Independent	1,864	2.55
Matrika Prasad Bhattarai	Independent	1,760	2.41
Others		3,131	4.29
Total		73,021	100.00
Majority		453	
People's Socialist Party, Nepal gain			
Source: Election Commission

=== Election in the 2010s ===
==== 2017 general elections ====
Party	Candidate	Votes
CPN (UML)	Jay Kumar Rai	44,528
Federal Socialist Forum, Nepal	Ashok Kumar Rai	22,123
Sanghiya Loktantrik Rastriya Manch	Krishna Man Limbu	1,521
CPN (Marxist–Leninist)	Harka Raj Bista	1,366
Others		3,212
Invalid votes		4,340
Result	CPN (UML) gain	
Source: Election Commission

==== 2017 Nepalese provincial elections ====
===== 1(A) =====
Party	Candidate	Votes
CPN (UML)	Pradeep Kumar Bhandari	19,243
Nepali Congress	Kishore Rai	13,770
Others		3,759
Invalid votes		1,689
Result	CPN (UML) gain	
Source: Election Commission

===== 1(B) =====
Party	Candidate	Votes
CPN (Unified Marxist–Leninist)	Bhim Prasad Acharya	20,211
Nepali Congress	Buddhi Bahadur Katuwal	12,964
Others		3,320
Invalid votes		2,015
Result	CPN (UML) gain	
Source: Election Commission

==== 2013 Constituent Assembly election ====
Party	Candidate	Votes
CPN (UML)	Krishna Kumar Rai	14,384
Nepali Congress	Chandra Prasad Shrestha	12,337
UCPN (Maoist)	Muksamahang Subba Limbu	9,025
Federal Socialist Party, Nepal	Dhyan Bahadur Rai	3,809
Rastriya Prajatantra Party Nepal	Judhha Bahadur Lohani	1,112
Rastriya Janamukti Party	Chandra Bahadur Limbu	1,042
Others		2,394
Result	CPN (UML) gain	
Source: NepalNews

=== Election in the 2000s ===
==== 2008 Constituent Assembly election ====
Party	Candidate	Votes
CPN (Maoist)	Kiran Kumar Rai	18,620
CPN (Unified Marxist–Leninist)	Manoj Kumar Myangbo	11,693
Nepali Congress	Uma Bastola	6,535
CPN (United)	Dipak Rai	1,944
Rastriya Prajatantra Party	Min Kumar Limbu	1,625
Others		1,968
Invalid votes		2,760
Result	Maoist gain	
Source: Election Commission

=== Election in the 1990s ===
==== 1999 legislative elections ====
Party	Candidate	Votes
CPN (UML)	Kunta Sharma	14,843
Nepali Congress	Chandra Prasad Shrestha	13,032
CPN (Marxist–Leninist)	Dhyan Bahadur Rai	5,799
Rastriya Prajatantra Party	Krishna Kumar Rai	4,251
Rastriya Janamukti Party	Shrawan Kumar Limbu	3,204
Others		902
Invalid Votes		813
Result	CPN (UML) hold	
Source: Election Commission

==== 1994 legislative elections ====
Party	Candidate	Votes
CPN (UML)	Lila Shrestha Subba	12,774
Nepali Congress	Binod Kumar Rai	7,705
Rastriya Prajatantra Party	Krishna Kumar Rap	7,337
Rastriya Janamukti Party	Gore Bahadur Khapangi	4,911
Others		902
Result	CPN (UML) hold	
Source: Election Commission

==== 1991 legislative elections ====
Party	Candidate	Votes
CPN (UML)	Man Mohan Adhikari	27,784
Nepali Congress	Bekh Dangol	12,342
Result	CPN (UML) gain	

== See also ==
- List of parliamentary constituencies of Nepal
