= Buddhi Prasad Pant =

Nepalese politician

The Honourable Buddhi Prasad Pant
- बुद्धिप्रसाद पन्त

Member of Parliament, Pratinidhi Sabha
- Incumbent
- Assumed office 26 March 2026
- Preceded by: Pradeep Yadav
- Constituency: Parsa 1

Personal details
- Citizenship: Nepalese
- Party: Rastriya Swatantra Party
- Profession: Politician

Buddhi Prasad Pant (Nepali: बुद्धिप्रसाद पन्त) is a Nepalese politician serving as a member of parliament from the Rastriya Swatantra Party. He is the member of the 7th Pratinidhi Sabha elected from Parsa 1 constituency in 2026 Nepalese General Election securing 27,274 votes and defeating his closest contender Pradeev Yadav of the CPN UML.
