= Binita Kumari Singh =

Nepalese politician

Honourable Binita Kumari Singh

Member of Parliament, Pratinidhi Sabha
- In office 22 December 2022 – 12 September 2025

Personal details
- Party: Janamat Party
- Other party: Janamat Party
- Spouse: Pankaj Kumar Singh
- Parents: Rajkishor (father); Dukhani Devi (mother)

Binita Kumari Singh is a Nepalese politician, belonging to the Janamat Party. She had served as a member of the 2nd Federal Parliament of Nepal. In the 2022 Nepalese general election she was elected as a proportional representative from the indigenous people category.
