= Ranju Kumari Jha =

Nepalese politician

Honourable Ranju Kumari Jha
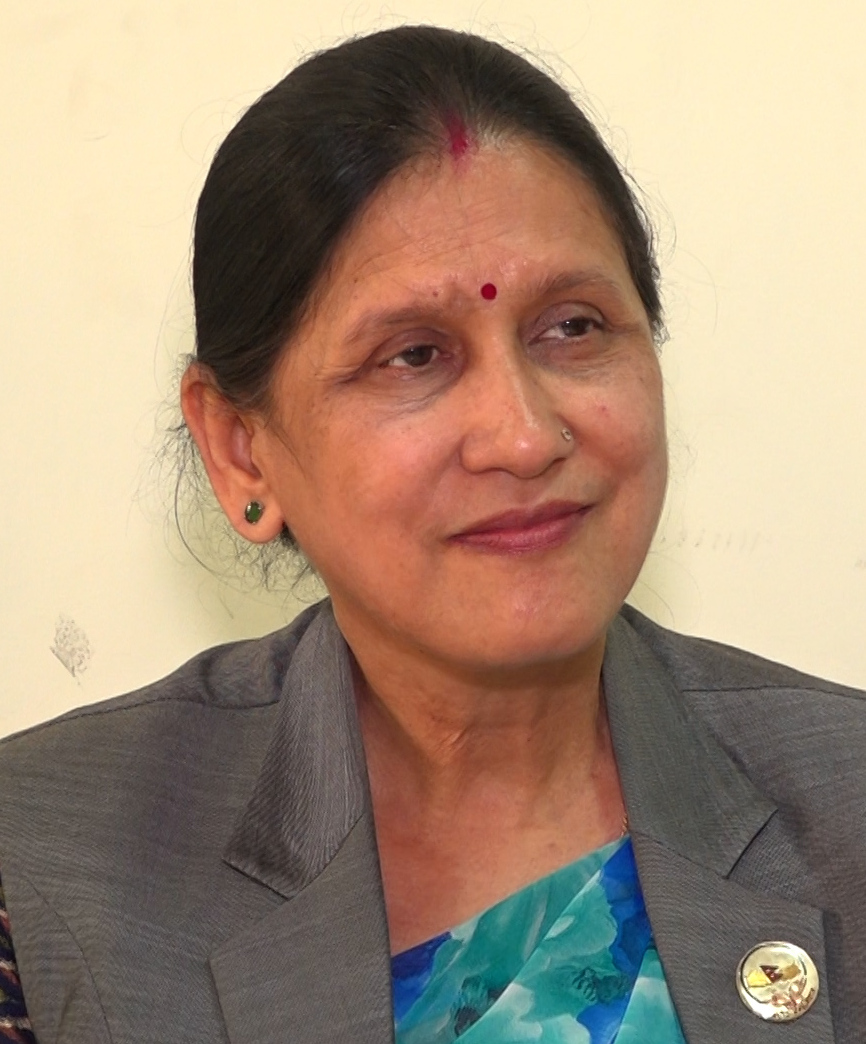

Member of Parliament, Pratinidhi Sabha
- In office 2022–2025
- Constituency: Party list

Personal details
- Born: September 7, 1965 (age 60)
- Party: Nepal Janata Party (2025-present)
- Other political affiliations: People's Socialist Party (Nepal)
- Spouse: Mihir Thakur
- Parents: Ramakant Jha (father); Sudha Devi (mother)

Ranju Kumari Jha (née Thakur) is a Nepalese politician and former Member of Parliament, Nepal. In the 2022 Nepalese general election she was elected as a proportional representative from the Madheshi female cluster.Currently, she is associated with Nepal Janata Party and serving as a general secretary.

== Early life ==
Ranju Kumari Jha was born on 07 September 1965 in Rajbiraj, Nepal to Ramakant Jha and Sudha Devi.She completed her M.A. and L.L.B. from Mahendra Bindeshwari Multiple Campus, Rajbiraj.

== Electoral performance ==
Election	Year	Constituency	Contested for	Political party	Result	Votes	% of votes
Nepal general election	2026	Saptari 2	Pratinidhi Sabha member	Nepal Janata Party	Lost	240	0.38%
