= Prakash Adhikari =

Nepalese politician

Honourable Prakash Adhikari

Member of Parliament, Pratinidhi Sabha for People's Socialist Party
- Incumbent
- Assumed office 2022

Personal details
- Party: People's Socialist Party
- Other political affiliations: People's Socialist Party
- Parents: Keshar Maan (father); Til Kumari (mother)

Prakash Adhikari is a Nepalese politician, belonging to the People's Socialist Party. He is currently serving as a member of the 2nd Federal Parliament of Nepal. In the 2022 Nepalese general election he was elected as a proportional representative from the Khas people category.
