= Mahendra Bindeshwari Multiple Campus =

Public college in Rajbiraj, Nepal

Mahendra Bindeshwari Multiple Campus Tribhuvan University
- महेन्द्र विन्देश्वरी बहुमुखी क्याम्पस त्रिभुवन विश्वविद्यालय
- Former name: Mahendra Bindeshwari College
- Type: Public
- Established: 1957
- Parent institution: Tribhuvan University
- Accreditation: University Grants Commission
- Campus Chief: Sushil Chandra Karna
- Academic staff: 58 (As of June 2026)
- Administrative staff: 21 (As of June 2026)
- Students: 3106 (As of June 2026)
- Location: Rajbiraj, Saptari; 26.5288093°N 86.7491332°E
- Campus: 79 acres (32 ha)
- Language: Nepali, English
- Nickname: MBMC
- Website: mbmc.tu.edu.np

Mahendra Bindeshwari Multiple Campus (Nepali: महेन्द्र विन्देश्वरी बहुमुखी क्याम्पस) is a constituent campus of Tribhuvan University in Rajbiraj municipality of Saptari district of Nepal. This campus is established in 1957 and it is the oldest campus in the district. Initially, the college offered an Intermediate of Arts program. Currently, it offers undergraduate courses in humanities and social science, education, science and technology, and law, as well as postgraduate courses in education and humanities and social science.

As of June 2026, The college had 58 academic and 21 administrative staff. On 26 March 2025, Prof. Sushil Chandra Karna was appointed campus chief by the decision of the executive council of the Tribhuvan University vice-chancellor's office.

== History ==
The college was established in 1957. The chief donor was Bindeshwari Prasad Singh, who donated 25 bigha of his land to establish this college. The college is named in honor of then king Mahendra Shah and Bindeshwari Prasad Singh, a local zamindar.

== Notable alumni ==
Some of the eminent graduates of the college include:

- Umesh Kumar Yadav, former Irrigatin Minister
- Ranju Kumari Jha, fomer Member of Parliament
- Manish Kumar Suman, MPA of Madhesh Provincial Assembly
