= Pushpa Kumari Chaudhary =

Nepalese politician

Honourable Pushpa Kumari Chaudhary

Member of Parliament, Pratinidhi Sabha
- Constituency: Saptari 1

Personal details
- Born: 30 December 1996 (age 29) Kanchanrup, Saptari District, Madhesh Province
- Party: Rastriya Swatantra Party
- Occupation: Politician; Health worker

Pushpa Kumari Chaudhary (born 20 November 1989) is a Nepalese politician and health worker. She has been a member of Rastriya Swatantra Party since its formation. She is member of the Pratinidhi Sabha from Saptari 1. In the 2026 general election, she won from Saptari 1 with 38,195 votes. She is also one of the 14 elected women candidates to the Pratinidhi Sabha in the 2026 general election, under the FPTP electoral system.

== Early life ==
Pushpa Kumari Chaudhary was born in Saptari district on 30 December 1996 in a Tharu family. She is an Pharmacist by profession and worked with USAID Nepal and Marie Stopes Nepal.

== Electoral performance ==
Election	Year	Constituency	Contested for	Political party	Result	Votes	% of votes
Nepal general election	2026	Saptari 1	Pratinidhi Sabha member	Rastriya Swatantra Party	Won	38,195	53.55%
