= Jay Kumar Rai =

Nepali politician

- जय कुमार राई

Member of Parliament, Pratinidhi Sabha
- In office 4 March 2018 – 18 September 2022
- Preceded by: Krishna Kumar Rai
- Constituency: Sunsari 1

Personal details
- Born: 1 September 1968 (age 57)
- Party: CPN (UML)

Jay Kumar Rai (also Jaya Kumar Rai) is a Nepali communist politician and a member of the House of Representatives of the federal parliament of Nepal. He won his seat from Sunsari-1 constituency representing CPN UML of the left alliance. This is the first time he has been elected to parliament. He defeated his nearest rival Ashok Kumar Rai, acquiring more than double the votes received by the latter. He received 44,528 votes to Ashok Rai's 22,123.

He is a member of the House Finance Committee and represents Nepal Communist Party in the parliament.
