= Renuka Gurung =

Nepali politician

Honourable Renuka Gurung
- रेनुका गुरुङ्ग

State Minister of Women, Children and Senior Citizens
- In office 4 June 2021 – 22 June 2021
- President: Bidya Devi Bhandari
- Prime Minister: KP Sharma Oli

Member of Parliament, Pratinidhi Sabha for Federal Socialist Forum party list
- Incumbent
- Assumed office 4 March 2018

Personal details
- Born: January 21, 1968 (age 58) Khotang District
- Party: People's Socialist Party
- Other party: Federal Socialist Forum

Renuka Gurung (Nepali: रेनुका गुरुङ्ग) is a Nepali politician and ex-State Minister of Women, Children and Senior Citizens. She was a member of the House of Representatives of the federal parliament of Nepal. She was elected under the proportional representation system from Federal Socialist Forum, Nepal. Previously, she had lost as Deputy-mayor candidate with just 99 votes. She is also a member of the parliamentary International Relations Committee.
