= Janata Loktantrik Party Nepal =

Janata Loktantrik Party जनता लोकतान्त्रिक पार्टी
- Abbreviation: JaLoPa
- Leader: Ashok Yadav
- Founder: Ashok Yadav
- Founded: 31 November 2025
- Split from: PSP-N
- Ideology: Federalism Madheshi rights Democratic Socialism
- Political position: Left-wing to Center-left
- Colours
- Seats in Lumbini Provincial Assembly: 1 / 87

Election symbol
- skin-invert

The Janata Loktantrik Party (Nepali: जनता लोकतान्त्रिक पार्टी, lit. 'People's Democratic Party') is a political party in Nepal led by former People's Socialist Party, Nepal leader and chairman of its Lumbini province committee Ashok Yadav.

== Leadership ==
=== President ===
- Ashok Yadav (2025-present)

== See also ==
- List of political parties in Nepal
