= Nawal Kishor Sah =

Nepalese politician

Honourable Nawal Kishor Sah Sudi
- नवल किशोर साह सुडी
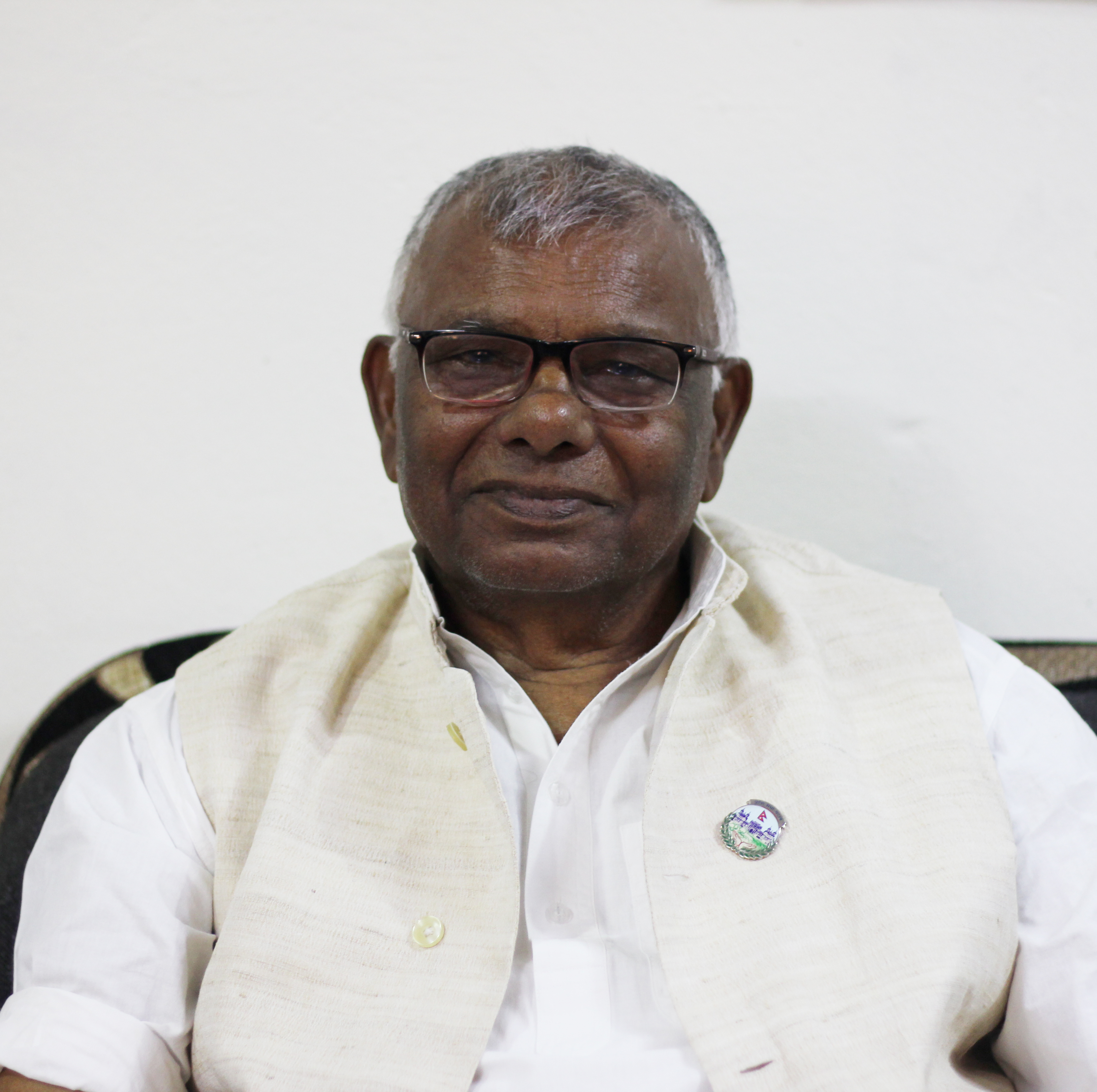
- Portrait of Sudi in 2019

Minister of Women, Children and Senior Citizens of Nepal
- In office 15 July 2024 – 9 September 2025
- President: Ram Chandra Poudel
- Prime Minister: Khadga Prasad Sharma Oli
- Preceded by: Bhagwati Chaudhary

Minister of Forests and Environment of Nepal
- In office 10 March 2024 – 8 July 2024
- President: Ram Chandra Poudel
- Prime Minister: Pushpa Kamal Dahal
- Preceded by: Birendra Prasad Mahato
- Succeeded by: Aain Bahadur Shahi Thakuri

Minister for Social Development of Madhesh Province
- In office 1 March 2018 – 11 January 2023
- Governor: Ratneshwar Lal Kayastha; Tilak Pariyar; Rajesh Jha; Hari Shankar Mishra
- Chief minister: Lalbabu Raut
- Preceded by: Provincial established
- Succeeded by: Surita Kumari Sah

Deputy Chairman of People's Socialist Party
- Incumbent
- Assumed office 5 May 2024
- Preceded by: position established

Member of Parliament, Pratinidhi Sabha
- In office 22 December 2022 – 12 September 2025
- Preceded by: Surya Narayan Yadav
- Constituency: Saptari 1

Member of the Madhesh Provincial Assembly
- In office February 2018 – September 2022
- Preceded by: Provincial established
- Succeeded by: Sakil Miya
- Constituency: Saptari 1(B)

Personal details
- Born: September 27, 1947 (age 78)
- Party: People's Socialist Party (Nepal)
- Occupation: Politician

Nawal Kishor Sah Sudi (Nepali: नवल किशोर साह सुडी) is a Nepalese politician who served as the Minister for Women, Children, and Senior Citizens in Nepal. He is a member of the Janata Samajwadi Party and was appointed to this position in July 2024. He previously served as the Minister for Forests and Environment, where he was involved in environmental protection initiatives.

He is also the Deputy Chairman of the People's Socialist Party, Nepal.

A resident of Kankalini Municipality in Saptari, Sudi was elected as a Pratinidhi Sabha member in the 2017 Nepalese provincial elections from Saptari 1. He has described Constitution Day of Nepal, September 19 as a 'black day' for Madhesh.

== Political career ==
Sah began his political career in 1967. He served as the Central Senior Vice-Chairperson of the Rastriya Janata Party Nepal (RJPN). In the 2017 Nepalese provincial elections, he contested as the Rastriya Janata Party Nepal candidate from Saptari 1(B) constituency and won. In 2021, following the merger of RJPN into the People's Socialist Party, Nepal, he became a member of the newly formed party.

In May 2020, he played a crucial role in setting up Polymerase chain reaction (PCR) machines, one in Janakpur and the other one in Rajbiraj among the two machines bought by the state government.

In December 2020, he inaugurated a thirteen-room health post in Hanumannagar Kankalini Municipality to ensure people that the government was working to provide health services in all local levels.

In June 2022, he inaugurated two-story building for Shree Faud Singh Janta Secondary School in Sarlahi District along with Consul General of India in Nepal, Nitesh Kumar.

=== Anti-Constitution protest ===
With the announcement of Constitution Day of Nepal on September 19 by the central government, Sah led anti-constitution protest in Saptari and Janakpur. Along with other Madhesh Province ministers, he marked the day as a Black Day for Madhesh.

== Personal life ==
Nawal Kishor Sah was born on 27 September 1947 to parents, Bhola Sah and Kaushalya Devi.

== Electoral history ==
=== 2017 Nepalese provincial elections ===
Party	Candidate	Votes
Rastriya Janata Party Nepal	Nawal Kishor Sah	13,647
Nepali Congress	Badri Narayan Mahatman Yadav	6,333
Communist Party of Nepal (Maoist Centre)	Sakil Ali Miya	6,257
Others		879
Invalid votes		3,301
Result	RJPN gain	
Source: Election Commission

== See also ==
- People's Socialist Party
