= Rekha Yadav Thapa =

Nepalese politician

Honourable Rekha Yadav Thapa

Member of Parliament, Pratinidhi Sabha for People's Socialist Party
- Incumbent
- Assumed office 2022

Personal details
- Party: People's Socialist Party
- Other party: People's Socialist Party
- Spouse: Raj Kumar Thapa
- Parents: Ram Narayan (father); Ratna Devi (mother)

Rekha Yadav Thapa is a Nepalese politician, belonging to the People's Socialist Party. She is currently serving as a member of the 2nd Federal Parliament of Nepal. In the 2022 Nepalese general election she was elected as a proportional representative from the Khas people category.
