= Hasina Khan =

Nepalese politician

Honourable Haseena Khan

Member of Parliament, Pratinidhi Sabha
- Incumbent
- Assumed office 19 April 2024
- President: Ram Chandra Poudel
- Prime Minister: Puspha Kamal Dahal
- Constituency: Party list

Personal details
- Party: People's Socialist Party (Nepal)
- Other political affiliations: PSP-N
- Spouse: Kashfudduja Khan

Haseena Khan is a Nepalese politician, belonging to the People's Socialist Party. She is currently serving as a member of the 2nd Federal Parliament of Nepal. In the 2022 Nepalese general election she was elected as a proportional representative from the Muslim people category.

== See also ==
- People's Socialist Party
