= Karima Begam =

Nepali politician

Mananiya Karima Begam
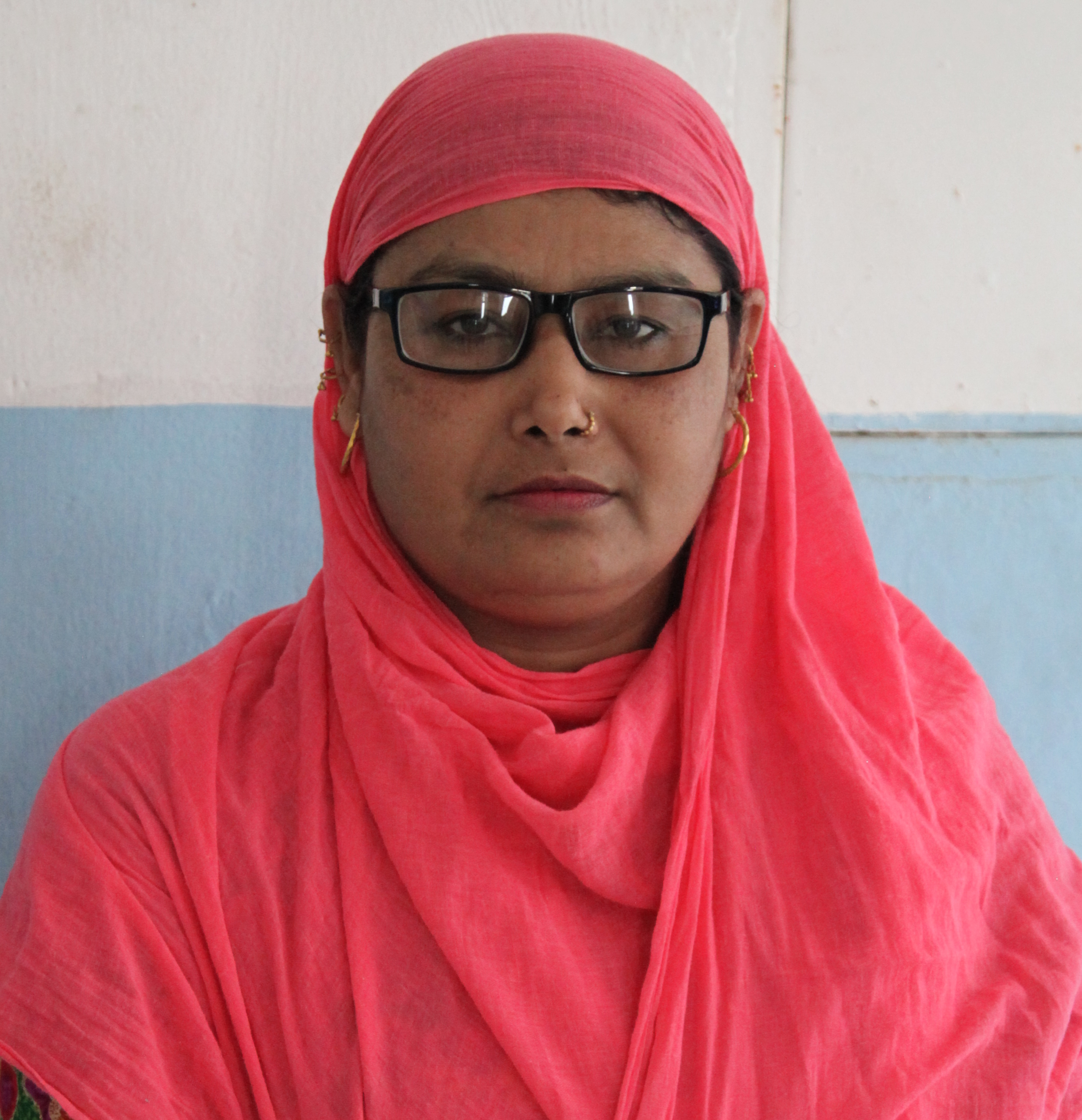

Formal Minister of state for agriculture
- In office 2009–2011
- Prime Minister: Madhav Kumar Nepal

Provincial Assembly Member of Madhesh Province
- Incumbent
- Assumed office 2018
- Preceded by: Office established
- Constituency: Parsa 1

Personal details
- Party: Independent
- Other political affiliations: Madhesi Jana Adhikar Forum Nepal
- Known for: slapping the CDO of Parsa district, helping a foreign national obtain Nepali citizenship illegally

Karima Begam, also Karima Begum, is a Nepali politician and a former state minister for Agriculture. She is currently a member of parliament in Province No. 2 state parliament.

== Biography ==
On 20 November 2009, while still minister, she reportedly slapped the then Chief District Officer of Parsa in the Officer's office for failing to procure her a vehicle during her visit to the district. She was fined two thousand rupees for the crime in February 2018 by the district court of Parsa. In the 2013 elections, she ran for parliament from Parsa-1 constituency representing Madhesi Jana Adhikar Forum - Nepal but was defeated. In 2015, she was fined twenty thousand rupees by the Parsa District court for aiding an Indian national to unlawfully/fraudulently acquire a Nepalese citizenship certificate in 2007. In the 2017 election, she was elected to state parliament of Province No. 2 representing Samajbadi Party, Nepal through proportional representation system of election.
