= Purusottam Poudel =

Nepali politician

Purushottam Paudel
- पुरुषाेत्तम पौडेल
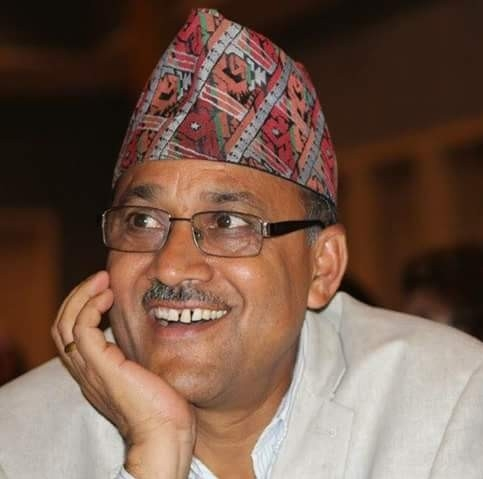

Minister of Youth and Sports of Nepal
- In office 25 February 2014 – 12 October 2015
- President: Ram Baran Yadav
- Prime Minister: Sushil Koirala
- Vice President: Paramananda Jha
- Succeeded by: Satya Narayan Mandal

Personal details
- Born: Puru
- Party: Communist Party of Nepal (Unified Marxist-Leninist)
- Spouse: Pramila paudel
- Children: Priya paudel Piyush Paudel
- Occupation: Politician
- Website: www.facebook.com/PurushottamCpnUml

Purushottam Paudel, a member of Communist Party of Nepal (Unified Marxist-Leninist), assumed the post of the Minister of Youth and Sports of Nepal on 25 February 2014 under Sushil Koirala-led government.

He is also a member of the 2nd Nepalese Constituent Assembly. He won the Bara–6 seat in 2013 Nepalese Constituent Assembly election from the Communist Party of Nepal (Unified Marxist–Leninist). He was very active leader since from his childhood during while he used to study in gaurishankar school nijgadh bara .
