= Raj Kumar Lekhi =

Raj Kumar Lekhi was once the head of the Tharu Kalyankari Society and chairman of the Nepal Federation of Indigenous Nationalities (NEFIN).
