= Raj Kishor Yadav =

Nepalese politician

Honourable Raj Kishor Yadav
- राज किशोर यादव

Minister of Industry, Commerce and Supplies
- In office 10 June 2021 – 22 June 2021
- President: Bidya Devi Bhandari
- Prime Minister: KP Sharma Oli

Member of Parliament, Pratinidhi Sabha
- Incumbent
- Assumed office 22 December 2022
- Preceded by: Suresh Chandra Das
- Constituency: Siraha 2
- In office 4 March 2018 – 18 September 2022
- Preceded by: Ram Chandra Yadav
- Succeeded by: Birendra Prasad Mahato
- Constituency: Siraha 4

Member of Constituent Assembly
- In office 28 May 2008 – 28 May 2012
- Preceded by: Constituency established
- Succeeded by: Ganesh Kumar Mandal
- Constituency: Siraha 6

Personal details
- Born: 1 August 1973 (age 52)
- Party: People's Socialist Party
- Other political affiliations: MJF-N; MJF-N (Republican); Rastriya Janata Party

Raj Kishor Yadav is a Nepalese politician, belonging to the People's Socialist Party. He was Industry, Commerce and Supplies Minister of Nepal since 10 June 2021 but was removed from the post by Supreme Court on 22 June 2021, making his 12-day tenure the shortest for any Nepali minister till date. In the 2017 Nepalese general election he was elected from the Siraha 4 constituency, securing 21144 (40.19%) votes.

== Electoral history ==
=== 2022 general election ===
Candidate	Party	Votes	%
Raj Kishor Yadav	People's Socialist Party, Nepal	24,178	35.68
Chitra Lekha Yadav	Nepali Congress	23,028	33.98
Binod Kumar Yadav	Janamat Party	16,902	24.94
Others		3,660	5.40
Total		67,768	100.00
Majority		1,150	
People's Socialist Party, Nepal			

=== 2017 general elections ===
Party	Candidate	Votes
Rastriya Janata Party Nepal	Raj Kishor Yadav	21,144
CPN (Maoist Centre)	Ajay Shankar Nayak	17,575
Nepali Congress	Mokhtar Ahmed	10,088
CPN (Marxist–Leninist)	Ram Iqbal Yadav	2,219
Others		1,585
Invalid votes		4,744
Result	RJPN gain	
Source: Election Commission
