= Balan-Bihul Rural Municipality =

Balan Bihul बलान-बिहुल
- Rural Municipality
- Location in Madhesh Province Balan Bihul (Nepal)
- Coordinates: 26.59°N 86.51°E
- Country: Nepal
- Development Region: Central
- Province: Madhesh Province
- District: Saptari District
- Established: 2073 BS

Government
  - Chairperson: Khem Chandra Yadav (Janamat)
  - Deputy chairperson: Renu Yadav (Janamat)

Area
  - Total: 118.19 km^{2} (45.63 sq mi)

Population (2011)
  - Total: 26,068
  - Density: 220.56/km^{2} (571.25/sq mi)
  - Ethnicities: Yadav Sah(teli) Mandals (dhanuk) Muslims Das(Baniya) Mehtas Mushars Maithil Brahamins
  - Religion: Hinduism Islam

Languages
  - Local: Maithili
  - Official: Nepali
- Time zone: UTC+5:45 (Nepal Time)
- Postal Code: 56406
- Area code: 031
- Website: balanbihulmun.gov.np

Balan-Bihul is a rural municipality in Saptari District in Province No. 2 of south-eastern Nepal. At the time of the 2017 Nepal census it had a population of 26,068 people living in 6,560 individual households. There are six village development committees (wards) malhaniya, (belhi Muslim tol before ruling Hansu Miya)., mauwha, sehra, madirwala tol etc. lies under this gaupalika.)
