= Parsa 1 =

Parliamentary constituency in Nepal

- Parliamentary constituency
- Parsa 1 in Province No. 2
- Province: Province No. 2
- District: Parsa District

Current constituency
- Created: 1991
- Party: Rastriya Swatantra Party
- Member of Parliament: Buddhi Prasad Pant
- Madhesh Pradesh MP 1क: Rahbar Ansari
- मधेस प्रदेश MP 1 ख: Lalbabu Raut

Parsa 1 is one of four parliamentary constituencies of Parsa District in Nepal. This constituency came into existence on the Constituency Delimitation Commission (CDC) report submitted on 31 August 2017.

== Incorporated areas ==
Parsa 1 incorporates wards 2, 4, 5, 7, 8, 11–16, 18, 20–23 and 30–32 of Birgunj Metropolitan City.

== Assembly segments ==
It encompasses the following Province No. 2 Provincial Assembly segment

- Parsa 1(A)
- Parsa 1(B)

== Members of Parliament ==
=== Parliament/Constituent Assembly ===
Election	Member	Party
1991	Atma Ram Ojha	Nepali Congress
1994	Rajiv Parajuli	Rastriya Prajatantra Party
1999	Krishna Prasad Bhattarai	Nepali Congress
2008	Karima Begam	Madheshi Janaadhikar Forum, Nepal
June 2009	Karima Begam	Madhehsi Janaadhikar Forum, Nepal (Democratic)
2013	Rajendra Bahadur Amatya	Nepali Congress
2017	Pradeep Yadav	Federal Socialist Forum, Nepal
May 2019	Pradeep Yadav	Samajbadi Party, Nepal
November 2022 / Mangsir 7 2079 BS	Pradeep Yadav	People's Socialist Party, Nepal
2026	Buddhi Prasad Pant	Rastriya Swatantra Party

=== Provincial Assembly ===
==== 1(A ====
Election	Member	Party
2017	Janat Ansari	Federal Socialist Forum, Nepal
May 2019	Janat Ansari	Samajbadi Party, Nepal
April 2020	Janat Ansari	People's Socialist Party, Nepal
2022	Rahabar Ansari	CPN(Maoist Centre)

==== 1(B) ====
Election	Member	Party
2017	Lalbabu Raut	Federal Socialist Forum, Nepal
May 2019	Lalbabu Raut	Samajbadi Party, Nepal
November 2022	Lalbabu Raut	People's Socialist Party, Nepal

== Election results ==
=== Election in the 2020s ===
==== 2022 general election ====
Candidate	Party	Votes	%
Pradeep Yadav	People's Socialist Party, Nepal	22,537	46.35
Ajay Kumar Dwivedi	Independent	20,917	43.02
Kiran Man Dangol	Rastriya Prajatantra Party	2,659	5.47
Laxman Lal Karna	Loktantrik Samajwadi Party, Nepal	1,117	2.30
Others		1,390	2.86
Total		48,620	100.00
Majority		1,620	
People's Socialist Party, Nepal hold			

=== Election in the 2010s ===
==== 2017 legislative elections ====
Party	Candidate	Votes
Federal Socialist Forum, Nepal	Pradeep Yadav	21,132
Nepali Congress	Anil Kumar Rugamta	16,481
CPN (Unified Marxist–Leninist)	Bichari Prasad Yadav	5,418
Others		1,564
Invalid votes		2,145
Result	FSFN gain	
Source: Election Commission

==== 2017 Nepalese provincial elections ====
===== 1(A) =====
Party	Candidate	Votes
Federal Socialist Forum, Nepal	Janat Ansari	8,593
Nepali Congress	Ram Narayan Prasad Kurmi	7,171
Communist Party of Nepal (Maoist Centre)	Rahabar Ansari	6,794
Others		1,211
Invalid votes		883
Result	FSFN gain	
Source: Election Commission

===== 1(B) =====
Party	Candidate	Votes
Federal Socialist Forum, Nepal	Lalbabu Raut	9,804
Nepali Congress	Bijay Kumar Sarraf	6,829
CPN (Unified Marxist–Leninist)	Shambhu Prasad	2,876
Others		1,626
Invalid votes		763
Result	FSFN gain	
Source: Election Commission

==== 2013 Constituent Assembly election ====
Party	Candidate	Votes
Nepali Congress	Rajendra Bahadur Amatya	12,463
Terai Madhes Loktantrik Party	Bimal Prasad Shriwastav	9,291
Rastriya Madhesh Samajwadi Party	Rajesh Man Singh	5,532
CPN (Unified Marxist–Leninist)	Navaraj Timilsina	2,273
Rastriya Prajatantra Party Nepal	Babita Devi	1,867
UCPN (Maoist)	Balaram Prasad Teli	1,705
Madheshi Janaadhikar Forum, Nepal	Karima Begum	1,092
Others		3,513
Result	Congress gain	
Source: NepalNews

=== Election in the 2000s ===
==== 2008 Constituent Assembly election ====
Party	Candidate	Votes
Madheshi Janaadhikar Forum, Nepal	Karima Begum	14,614
Nepali Congress	Rajendra Bahadur Amatya	12,302
Rastriya Prajatantra Party	Bimal Prasad Shriwastav	7,155
Terai Madhes Loktantrik Party	Ramesh Prasad Kurmi	2,379
CPN (Unified Marxist–Leninist)	Babu Jan Ali Sheikh	2,301
CPN (Maoist)	Rajdev Hajara	1,041
Others		2,500
Invalid votes		3,297
Result	MJFN gain	
Source: Election Commission

=== Election in the 1990s ===
==== 1999 legislative elections ====
Party	Candidate	Votes
Nepali Congress	Krishna Prasad Bhattarai	24,299
CPN (Unified Marxist–Leninist)	Chiranjibi Acharya	13,193
Rastriya Prajatantra Party	Rajiv Parajuli	7,258
Nepal Sadbhawana Party	Laxman Lal Karna	1,926
CPN (Marxist–Leninist)	Junaid Ansari	1,258
Others		934
Invalid Votes		861
Result	Congress gain	
Source: Election Commission

==== 1994 legislative elections ====
Party	Candidate	Votes
Rastriya Prajatantra Party	Rajiv Parajuli	14,830
CPN (Unified Marxist–Leninist)	Chiranjibi Acharya	10,062
Nepali Congress	Atma Ram Ojha	9,962
Nepal Sadbhawana Party	Dr. Rabindra Singh	2,873
Others		1,069
Result	RPP gain	
Source: Election Commission

==== 1991 legislative elections ====
Party	Candidate	Votes
Nepali Congress	Atma Ram Ojha	17,703
CPN (Unified Marxist–Leninist)	Chiranjibi Acharya	10,391
Result	Congress gain	

== See also ==
Parsa1

- List of parliamentary constituencies of Nepal
