= CK Raut =

Nepalese activist, MP and engineer (born 1977)

Chandra Kant Raut
- चन्द्रकान्त राउत
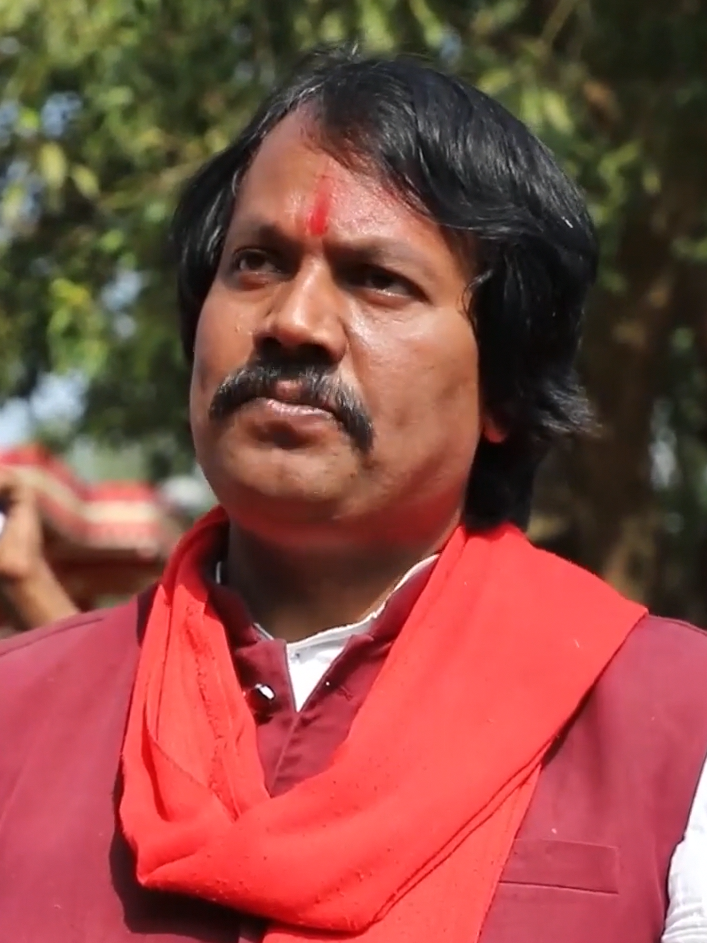
- Raut in 2022

Member of the House of Representatives
- In office 22 December 2022 – 12 September 2025
- Preceded by: Upendra Yadav
- Succeeded by: Ramjee Yadav
- Constituency: Saptari 2

Personal details
- Born: Chandra Kant Raut; 31 August 1977 (age 49) Mahadeva, Saptari, Nepal
- Citizenship: Nepalese
- Party: Janamat Party
- Education: PhD
- Alma mater: Tribhuvan University; University of Tokyo; Cambridge University

Chandra Kant Raut (Nepali: चन्द्रकान्त राउत; born 31 August 1977), popularly known as Dr. CK Raut, is a scientist, former Nepalese Member of Parliament (MP), computer engineer, former United States Defense programmer, author, politician, and activist. He is a gold medalist in the Bachelor of Engineering from Pulchowk Campus, a central campus of Institute of Engineering (IOE), Tribhuvan University. He was active in the Alliance for Independent Madhesh, to establish a country for the Madhesi people.

His secessionist advocacy led to repeated arrests, house arrest, and injuries from the Nepalese authorities. Following a jail term in 2018-19, he chose to participate in mainstream politics, replacing calls for Madhesh independence with calls for national unity, and forming the Janamat Party. In the 2022 Nepalese general election, he was elected as a member of the Pratinidhi Sabha, the lower house of Parliament. He lost his seat in the 2026 Nepalese general election.

== Early life of CK Raut ==
Raut was born in Mahadeva village of Saptari district of Nepal. He attended primary school in his village and high school at Laxmi Ballav Narsingh Secondary School in Babhangama Katti. He computerised first of all Tirhuta (Maithili Writing System) font. He went on to study at Tribhuvan University (Nepal), Tokyo University (Japan) and Cambridge University (UK). He is a recipient of the Young Nepalese Engineer Award, Mahendra Bidhya Bhusan, Kulratna Gold Medal, and Trofimenkoff Academic Achievement Award.

== Political life ==
=== Alliance for Independent Madhesh ===
Raut was the president and the founding member of Alliance for Independent Madhesh, which in its manifesto has described itself as a coalition of Terai people discriminated by Pahadi civilisation. It has people of various sub-ethnicities, activists, parties and various organisations who are working towards establishing an independent Madhesh. Although it was established in 2007, it did not announce their manifesto until a press conference in Kathmandu on 21 May 2012. The manifesto states the main objective of the alliance is to achieve independence of Madhesh through peaceful and non-violent means. It has also demanded an end an end to racism, slavery and discrimination imposed on Nepali people of Madheshi origin by the Pahadi people. It claims to have three pillars: independent Madhesh of Nepal, non-violence and peaceful means, and a democratic system.

=== Arrest ===
On 13 September 2014, the Government of Nepal arrested Raut for on the grounds of sedition after giving a speech to a gathering of Santhals, an indigenous population of Nepalese, in their annual festival. After his arrest, Raut began to fast in protest, arguing that his right to freedom and expression was being violated by the government. He was subsequently hospitalized on 25 September after complaints of severe stomach pain. Nepali Congress Vice-president Ram Chandra Poudel, Minister for Information and Communications Minendra Rijal, and Agriculture Minister Hari Parajuli visited Raut in the hospital to urge him to end his fast. Raut ended his fast on the 1 October, after 11 days, upon the Nepalese government's request and commitment to respect freedom of expression. The Attorney Office filed a sedition case at the Special Court on 8 October.

=== Speech in Biratnagar ===
On 3 January 2015, Raut was again arrested while giving a speech at degree College. Many supporters were injured following a clash with police. A dozen police personnel were also injured. Raut's supporters claimed police had used brutal force and did not allow him to be hospitalised locally for injuries incurred during the clash.

=== Janamat Party formation ===
Raut quit the secessionist movement on 8 March 2019, signing an agreement with Prime minister KP Sharma Oli. Subsequently, the Janamat Party was formed by Raut on 18 March 2019.

=== Member of Parliament ===
On 9 September 2025, Raut resigned as MP in the House of Representatives following the 2025 Nepalese Gen Z protests, calling for a new republic to be established in order to best address the protests. He was defeated in the 2026 Nepalese general election by RSP candidate Ramjee Yadav, taking the third highest number of vote in his constituency.

== Electoral Performance ==
=== 2022 Nepalese general election ===
Saptari District Constituency - 2
Candidate	Party	Votes	Result
CK Raut	Janamat Party	35,042	Won
Upendra Yadav	People Socialist Party	16,979	Defeated

=== 2026 Nepalese general election ===
Saptari District Constituency - 2
Candidate	Party	Votes	Result
Ramjee Yadav	Rastriya Swatantra Party	28,404	Won
Umesh Kumar Yadav	JSP Nepal	14,263	Defeated
CK Raut	Janamat Party	9,880	Defeated
Satish Kumar Singh	Swabhiman Party	3,557	Defeated

== International support ==
New York City based Human Rights Watch issued the statement on the arrest and subsequent filing of sedition charges against Raut.

Asian Human Rights Commission stated, that everyone has the rights to freedom of speech, movement, peaceful assembly and association are the fundamental rights of all human beings everywhere, as also mandated by the United Nations Universal Declaration of Human Rights, of which Nepal is a signatory, we expect acknowledgement and assurance of our rights from the state and its agencies. The AHRC urges the government of Nepal to immediately release Dr Chandra Kant Raut. The AHRC fears possible torture, harassment and other ill treatment during their arbitrary arrest by the Morang Police." Amnesty International also wrote a letter to the Nepalese Minister for Home Affairs, demanding Raut's release.

== Books and films ==
1. मधेश स्वराज / Madhesh Swaraj
2. मधेश का इतिहास / A History of Madhesh
3. वीर मधेशी / Bir Madheshi
4. वैरागदेखि बचावसम्म (आत्मकथा) [Denial to Defense]
5. Black Buddhas: The Madheshis of Nepal (documentary)

== Criticisms ==
Raut has been criticised both for his past seccessionist movements and (after 2019) for abandoning the cause of an independent Madhesh. Nepali nationalist critics have accused him of being a dangerous element weakening Nepal's national sovereignty by creating deep fractions between the Madheshi and Pahadi community. On the other hand, his most trusted ally Kailash Mahato and other members of Alliance for Independent Madhesh left him after he quit the core agendas of Free Madhesh.
