= Tirhut Rural Municipality =

Tirhut तिरहुत
- Rural Municipality (Gaunpalika)
- Location in Madhesh Province Tirhut (Nepal)
- Coordinates: 26.57°N 86.84°E
- Country: Nepal
- Zone: Sagarmatha Zone
- District: Saptari District
- Established: 2073

Government
  - Chairperson: Bijay Kumar Yadav (NC)
  - Vice-Chairperson: Bina Devi Yadav

Population (2017)
  - Total: 22,090
- Time zone: UTC+5:45 (Nepal Time)
- Postal code: 56400
- Area code: 031
- Website: http://www.tirahutmun.gov.np/

Tirhut is a rural municipality in Saptari District in the Sagarmatha Zone of south-eastern Nepal. At the time of the 2017 Nepal census it had a population of 22,090 people living in 8921 individual households.
