= Pradeep Yadav (Nepalese politician) =

Nepali politician

- प्रदीप यादव
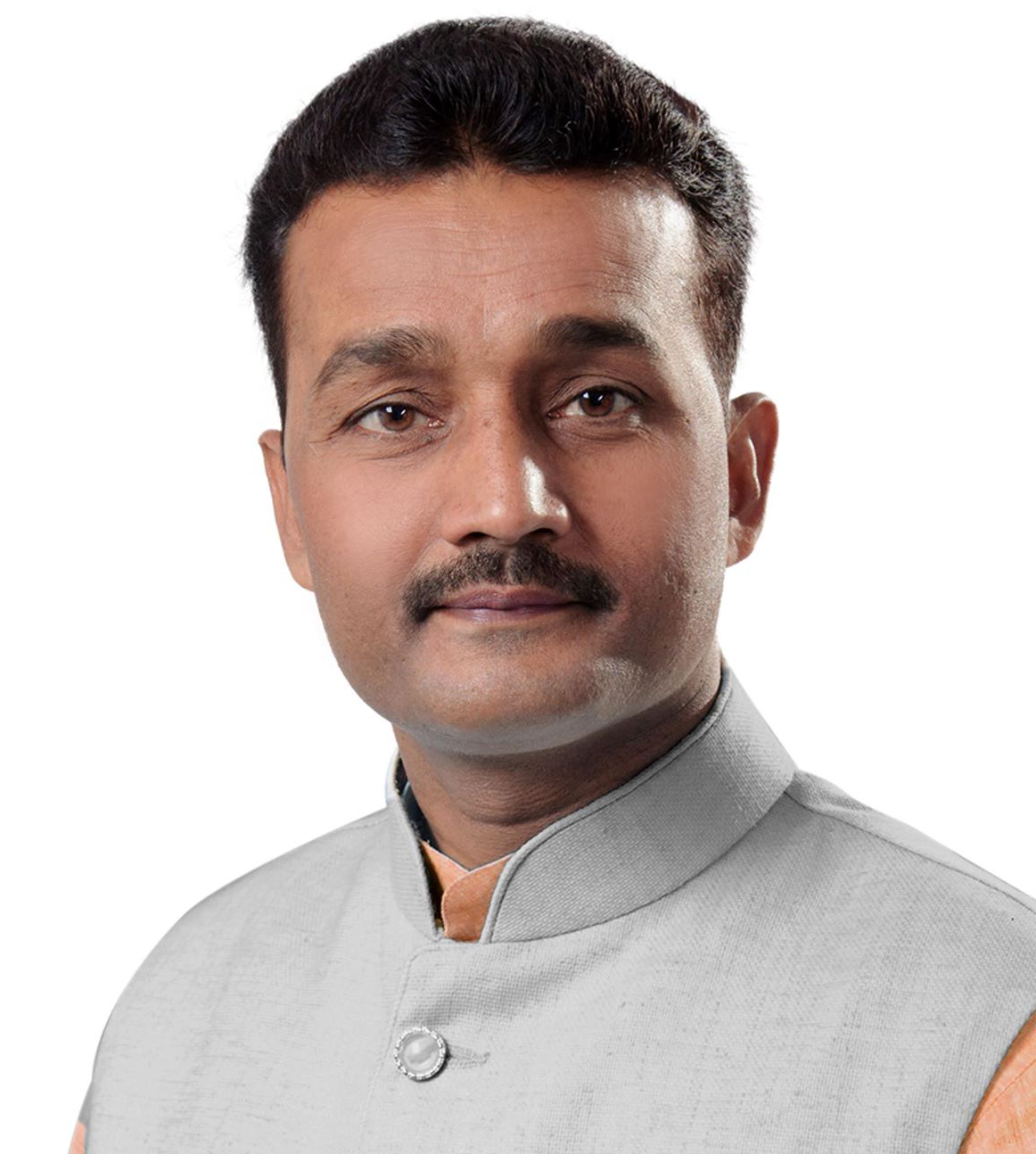
- Yadav in 2019

Minister of Water Supply of Nepal
- In office 15 July 2024 – 9 September 2025
- President: Ram Chandra Poudel
- Prime Minister: KP Sharma Oli
- Preceded by: Rajendra Kumar Rai

Minister of Health and Population of Nepal
- In office 13 May 2024 – 8 July 2024
- President: Ram Chandra Poudel
- Prime Minister: Pushpa Kamal Dahal
- Preceded by: Upendra Yadav
- Succeeded by: Pradip Paudel

Minister of Forests and Environment of Nepal
- In office 4 July 2022 – 14 October 2022
- President: Bidya Devi Bhandari
- Prime Minister: Sher Bahadur Deuba
- Preceded by: Ram Sahaya Yadav
- Succeeded by: Sher Bahadur Deuba (as Prime Minister)

Member of the House of Representatives
- In office 4 March 2018 – 12 September 2025
- Preceded by: Rajendra Bahadur Amatya
- Succeeded by: Buddhi Prasad Pant
- Constituency: Parsa 1

Personal details
- Born: 7 May 1975 (age 51) Parsa District
- Party: Communist Party of Nepal (Unified Marxist-Leninist)
- Other political affiliations: People's Socialist Party; Rastriya Prajatantra Party; MJF-N; PSP-N
- Website: pradipyadav.com

Pradeep Yadav (Nepali: प्रदीप यादव) (born 7 May 1975) is a Nepali politician and a former member of the Federal Parliament of Nepal since 2017 until 2025. He had served as the Minister of Water Supply of Nepal.

Yadav, who is the deputy secretary general of People's Socialist Party, has also served as Minister of Health & Population from May 13, 2024, to July 8, 2024, and as Minister of Forests & Environment from July 4, 2022, to October 13, 2022.

In the 2017 general election, he was elected from the Parsa 1 constituency. He repeated his candidacy from the same constituency in 2023 general election, and was elected for the second consecutive term. Yadav has also served as the whip for the Janata Samajwadi Party Nepal from May 26, 2023, to May 5, 2024.

== See also ==
- People's Socialist Party
