= Alliance for Independent Madhesh =

- President: C.K. Raut
- Founded: 2006
- Dissolved: March 2019
- Succeeded by: Janamat Party
- Ideology: Madhesh self-determinism Non-violence; Liberal democracy

Website
- madhesh.com

The Alliance for Independent Madhesh (AIM) was a Nepalis' coalition of Madhesi people made up of activists, parties and various organisations working for establishing an independent and sovereign Madhesh state out of Nepal. After signing an 11-point agreement with the government of Nepal, it resulted in ending his separatist movement with KP Oli.

In 2007, AIM announced its manifesto and revealed its programs through a press conference in Kathmandu on 21 May 2012. It aims to achieve independence of Madhesh through peaceful and non-violent means. It demands an end to what it calls Nepal's colonisation in Madhesh, an end to racism, slavery and discrimination imposed on Nepali people of Madheshi origin.

AIM's three pillars were:

1. An independent Madhesh
2. Non-violence and peaceful means
3. Democratic system

== Activities ==
AIM holds awareness programs, rallies and mass assemblies demanding independence. It also participates in social work and environmental campaigns. In 2016, it initiated a so-called "One Million Neem Plantation Movement".

== Referendums ==
In 2015–2016 AIM claimed to have held mock referendums in several districts of Madhesh, in which people overwhelmingly voted in favor of Free Madhesh. As a result, the government "intensified its brutal suppression against Madhesi activists" according to the activists themselves.

== International response ==
Amnesty International, Human Rights Watch, Asian Human Rights Commission, Bar Human Rights Committee of England and Wales etc. have acknowledged and defended peaceful means used by AIM and demanded from the Government of Nepal for human-rights protection of the activists. They have also demanded for the rights to organise, peaceful assembly and freedom of expression.
