= Ashok Rai =

Nepali politician

Honourable Ashok Kumar Rai
- अशोककुमार राई
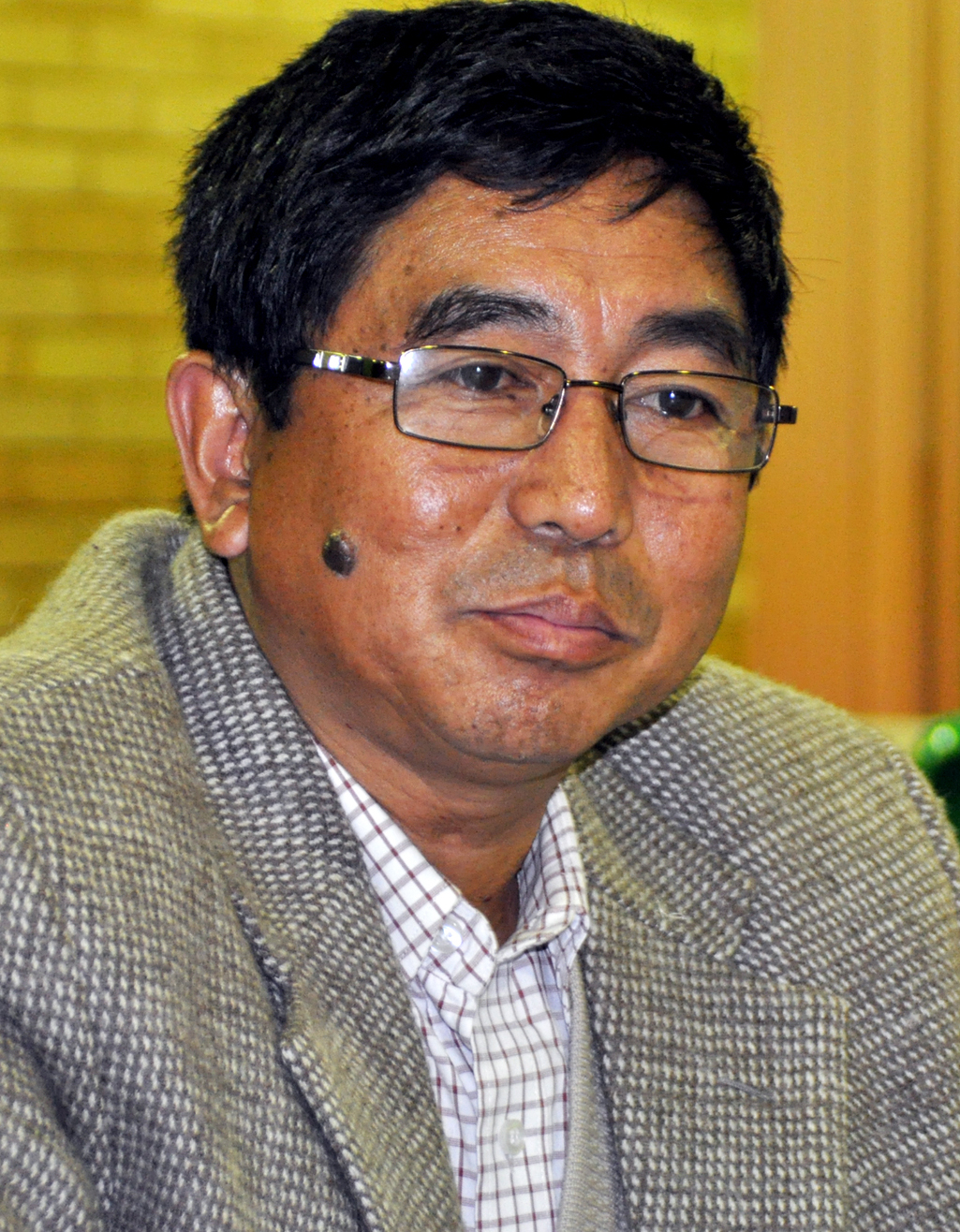
- Rai in 2010

Chairman of People's Socialist Party
- Incumbent
- Assumed office 6 June 2024
- Preceded by: position established

Minister of Education, Science and Technology
- In office 31 March 2023 – 6 March 2024
- President: Ram Chandra Paudel
- Prime Minister: Pushpa Kamal Dahal
- Vice President: Ram Sahaya Yadav
- Preceded by: Pushpa Kamal Dahal
- Succeeded by: Sumana Shrestha

Member of Parliament, Pratinidhi Sabha
- In office 22 December 2022 – 12 September 2025
- Preceded by: Jay Kumar Rai
- Succeeded by: Harka Sampang (elect)
- Constituency: Sunsari 1
- In office October 1994 – May 1999
- Preceded by: Kul Prasad Sharma
- Succeeded by: Shiva Kumar Basnet
- Constituency: Khotang 2
- In office May 1991 – August 1994
- Preceded by: Constituency established
- Succeeded by: Constituency abolished
- Constituency: Khotang 3

Member of 2nd Nepalese Constituent Assembly for Federal Socialist Party list
- In office 21 January 2014 – 14 October 2018

Personal details
- Born: August 30, 1957 (age 68) Udayapur District, Nepal
- Party: Janata Samajbadi
- Other political affiliations: CPN (UML) (until 2012); FSP (2012–2015); FSF-N (2015–2019); Socialist Party (2019–2020)
- Spouse: Sushila Shrestha

Ashok Kumar Rai (Nepali: अशोककुमार राई) is a Nepalese politician and chairman of the newly formed People's Socialist Party. Rai is also the current MP for Sunsari 1 and the former Minister for Science, Education and Technology of Nepal.

== Political life ==
He was previously the vice-chairman of CPN (Unified Marxist-Leninist) before he broke off with other indigenous leaders in the party to form the Federal Socialist Party. He later merged the party with Madheshi Janaadhikar Forum and Khas Samabesi Party to form the Federal Socialist Forum.

He was elected to the House of Representatives from Sunsari 1 at the 2022 general elections. He had previously served as an MP from Khotang 2 and Khotang 3 after being elected at the 1991 and 1994 elections, respectively. He was also elected as a member of the 2nd Nepalese Constituent Assembly from the Federal Socialist Party list.

== See also ==
- People's Socialist Party
