= Satya Narayan Mandal =

Nepali politician

Satya Narayan Mandal सत्यनारायण मंडल
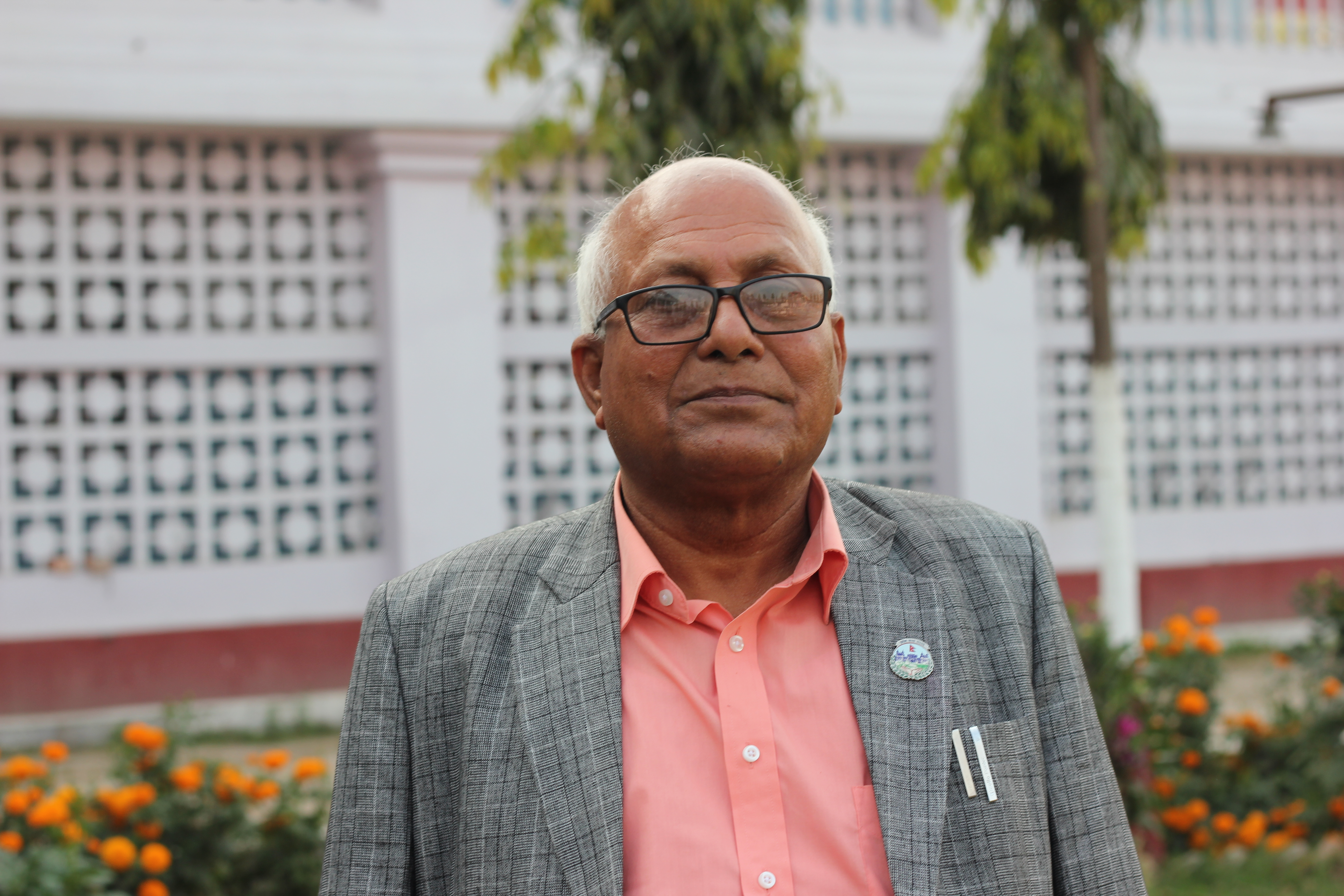
- Satya Narayan Mandal at Province No. 2 Assembly Hall

Minister of Youth and Sports
- In office 19 October 2015 – 4 August 2016
- President: Bidhya Devi Bhandari
- Prime Minister: KP Sharma Oli
- Preceded by: Purusottam Poudel
- Succeeded by: Daljit Shreepaili

Provincial Assembly Member of Madhesh Province
- Incumbent
- Assumed office 2018 May 23
- Preceded by: N/A
- Constituency: Saptari 1 (A)

Personal details
- Born: Saptakoshi Municipity, Saptari, Nepal
- Party: Independent
- Other political affiliations: CPN (UML) (till 2022)

Satya Narayan Mandal (Nepali: सत्यनारायण मंडल) is a Nepalese politician and the former party leader of Province No. 2. He was a member of the Communist Party of Nepal (Unified Marxist–Leninist) till 2022 general election.

== Career ==
Satya Narayan Mandal is one of the oldest politicians of Nepal. He joined the party in 2028 BS. He became an active member of CPN (Party) in 2036 BS and became a member of National Assembly in 2048 BS. He is the first Minister from Dhobi community.

He was elected the non-departmental minister of Nepal on 12 October 2015 CE under the government of Khadga Prasad Oli. He then transferred served as Sports and Youth Minister of Nepal.

== Electoral history ==
=== 2017 Nepalese provincial elections ===
Party	Candidate	Votes
CPN (Unified Marxist–Leninist)	Satya Narayan Mandal	11,302
Rastriya Janata Party Nepal	Raj Kumar Lekhi	9,252
Nepali Congress	Subodh Kumar Pokharel	8,705
Naya Shakti Party Nepal	Ashok Kumar Chaudhary	1,618
Others		816
Invalid votes		1,963
Result	CPN (UML) gain	
Source: Election Commission
