= Naraha Rural Municipality =

Naraha नरहा
- Rural Municipality
- Location in Nepal
- Coordinates: 26.67°N 86.25°E
- Country: Nepal
- Province: Province No. 2
- District: Siraha District
- Established: 2073

Government
  - Chairperson: Ram Pramod Yadav
  - Vice-Chairperson: Gulab Devi Chaudhary

Population (2011)
  - Total: 19,369
- Time zone: UTC+5:45 (Nepal Time)
- Postal code: 56500
- Area code: 033
- Website: http://www.narahamun.gov.np/

Naraha is a rural municipality in the Siraha District of Province No. 2 in southeastern Nepal. At the time of the 2011 Nepal census, it had a population of 19,369. Ward No. 3 had the largest population, while Ward No. 2 had the smallest.

The municipality comprised 3,673 households, with Ward No. 3 having the most (870) and Ward No. 2 the fewest (437). The primary language spoken is in the municipality is Maithili. Other languages include Urdu, Tharu, Uranw/Urau, Nepali, Newar, Tamang, Danuwar, and Sunuwar.

The top castes in Naraha are Yadav, Musahar, Muslim, Koiri/Kushwaha, and Chamar/Harijan/Ram, making up 71.55% of the population.

Most households rely on tubewells for water, while some have access to piped tap water. A significant number of households have reported using at least one facility, such as radios, televisions, and bicycles, with mobile phones being the most common.
