= Kalyanpur, Siraha =

Place in Nepal

Kalyanpur कल्याणपुर
- Municipality
- Location in Nepal
- Coordinates: 26.86°N 86.22°E
- Country: Nepal
- Zone: Sagarmatha Zone
- District: Siraha District

Government
  - Mayor: Surya Nath Mandal
  - Deputy Mayor: Rohini Kumari Yadav

Population (2011)
  - Total: 49,288
- Time zone: UTC+5:45 (Nepal Time)
- Website: http://www.kalyanpurmun.gov.np/

Kalyanpur is a municipality in Siraha District in the Sagarmatha Zone of south-eastern Nepal. At the time of the 2011 Nepal census it had a population of 49288 people living.
