= Janamat Party =

Political party in Nepal

Public Opinion Party जनमत पार्टी 𑂔𑂢𑂧𑂞 𑂣𑂰𑂩𑂹𑂗𑂲 Janamata Pārṭī
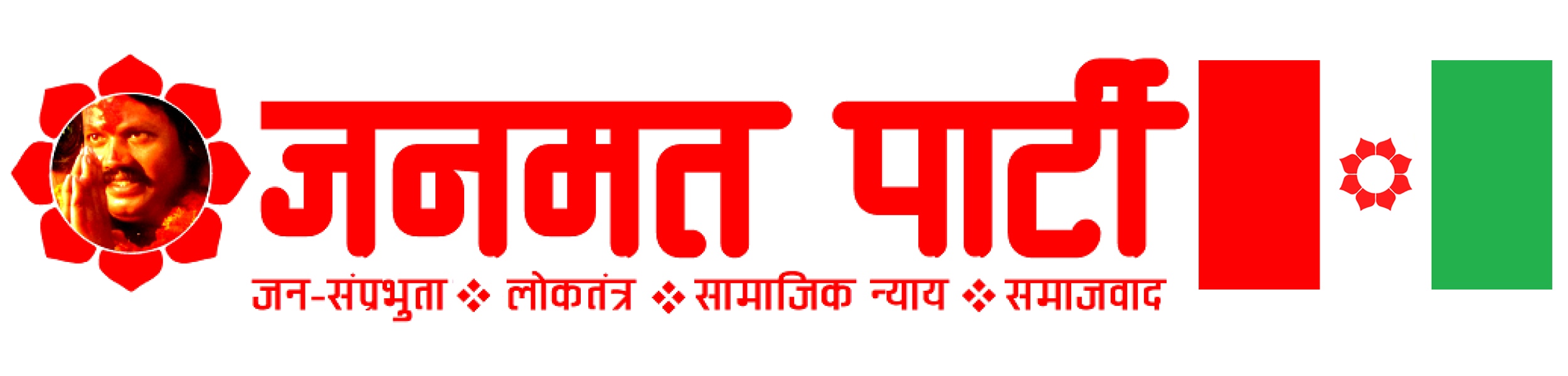
- President: C. K. Raut
- Senior Vice President: Er. Basant Kushwaha
- Founder: C. K. Raut
- Founded: 18 March 2019 (7 years ago)
- Preceded by: Alliance for Independent Madhesh
- Headquarters: Jawalakhel, Lalitpur
- Ideology: Social democracy Regionalism; Madhesi rights
- Colours
- Slogan: Sovereignty, Democracy, Social Justice, Socialism
- ECN Status: Provincial Party
- Pratinidhi Sabha: 0 / 275
- Seats in National Assembly: 0 / 59
- Madhesh Provincial Assembly: 11 / 107
- Lumbini Provincial Assembly: 3 / 87
- Local governments: 2 / 753 Mayor/Chairperson

Election symbol

Party flag
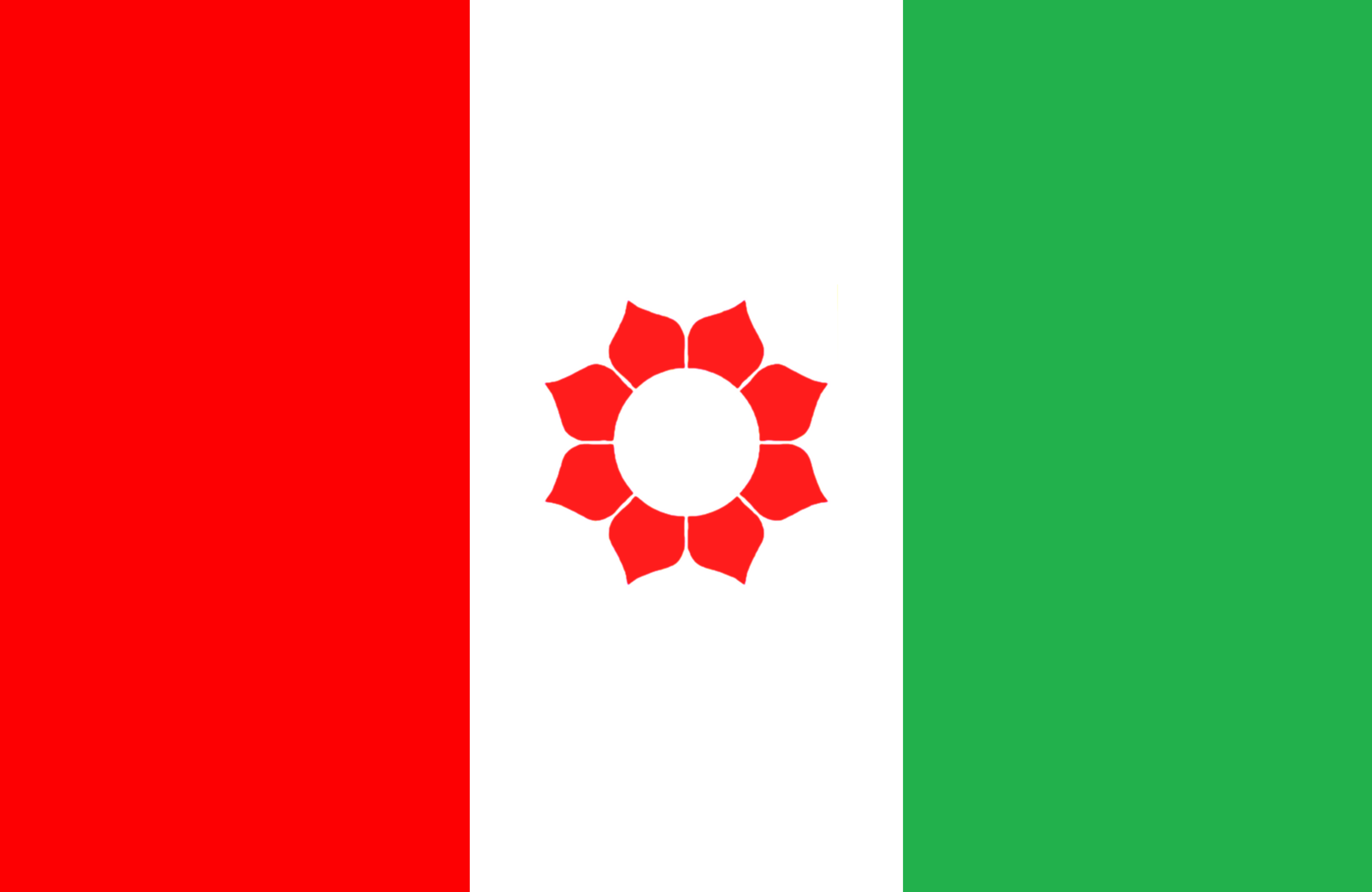

Website
- janamatparty.org

The Janamat Party (Nepali: जनमत पार्टी, lit. 'Public Opinion Party') is a Nepalese political party. The party stands as a national party in Nepal and is the eighth-largest party since the 2022 general election. The party currently supports Madhesh government led by Loktantrik Samajwadi Party, Nepal.

== History ==
=== Formation ===
Formerly known as Alliance for Independent Madhesh, it was formed by former secessionist leader C. K. Raut. It was formed after signing an 11-point agreement with the government of Nepal and resulted in ending his separatist movement with KP Oli. The party was formed on 18 March 2019 after a two-day conclave held on 17–18 March in front of 50 delegates representing 22 districts of Nepal's Terai region. A three-member committee headed by Chandan Singh was formed to implement the deal signed with the government. Aimed at expanding the party's strength, a 35-member central working committee was also formed under Raut's leadership.

=== Party expansion and 2022 elections ===
The party underwent development of party organization centered mainly in Lumbini and Madhesh Province. Though the party couldn't get expected level of success, it was able to win two local levels of Saptari district which include Balan-bihul and Hanumannagar Kankalini Municipality which were previously won by Janata Samajwadi Party. Due to Janamat party, the vote bank of Janata Samajwadi Party was seen to have largely declined limiting the former largest party of Madhesh province to third position. Party won Hanumannagar Kankalini mayor defying son of provincial minister Nawal Kishor Sah, Shailesh Kumar Sah who was also the outgoing mayor.

The party won decisive seats in the Madhesh provincial assembly. The party chair CK Raut won from Saptari 2 defying Upendra Yadav, the chairman of People's Socialist Party, Nepal. The party crossed 3% threshold limit to take the toll to 5 in Pratinidhi Sabha. The party chair and Congress senior leader Bimalendra Nidhi had positive talks regarding future government formation at national level and provincial assembly on 30 November 2022. During the talks, Raut cleared that he was a firm believer of democracy and was ready to join hands with Congress forming a democratic government.

=== Intra party disagreements split ===
Party deputy chairperson Dipak Kumar Sah and treasurer Surendra Narayan Yadav were suspended from the party after they questioned on party nepotism and ideology to leadership. Later a group led by senior deputy chairperson Abdul Khan, spokesperson Dr Sharad Singh Yadav and more left the party after party chairperson and his brother Jaykant Raut didn't leave place for new leadership rise.

The group formed a party named Janaswaraj Party under leadership of party vice president Dipak Kumar Sah which was later joined by chief minister of Madhesh Province, Satish Kumar Singh along with few MLAs.

=== List of Members of Parliament ===
==== Pratinidhi Shabha (2022–2025) ====
These MPs list of order is based on party power holdings, ministerial rank, and tenure in the House of Representatives.

Janamat Party (6)
Constituency/PR group	Member	Assumed office	End office	Tenure	Portfolio & Responsibilities / Remarks
Saptari 2	Chandra Kant Raut	22 December 2022	12 September 2025	2 years, 264 days	Parliamentary party leader
Muslim	Abdul Khan	22 December 2022	12 September 2025	2 years, 264 days	Deputy parliamentary party leader
Madheshi	Anita Devi Sah	22 December 2022	12 September 2025	2 years, 264 days	Chief Whip
Khas Arya	Goma Labh	22 December 2022	12 September 2025	2 years, 264 days	Whip
Indigenous peoples	Binita Kumari Singh	22 December 2022	12 September 2025	2 years, 264 days	
Indigenous peoples	Sonu Murmu	22 December 2022	12 September 2025	2 years, 264 days	

== Electoral performance ==
=== General election ===
Election	Leader	Party list votes			Seats	±	Position	Status
Election	Leader	No.	%	±	Seats	±	Position	Status
2022	C. K. Raut	394,655	3.74	—N/a	6 / 275	—N/a	8th	In coalition
2026	C. K. Raut	79,435	0.73	▼3.01	0 / 275	▼6	▼9th	Extra parliamentary

=== Provincial election ===
Province	Election	Party list votes		Seats	Position	Resulting government
Province	Election	No.	%	Seats	Position	Resulting government
Madhesh	2022	329,177	15.78	13 / 107	4th	Coalition government
Lumbini	2022	81,605	4.32	3 / 87	6th	Confidence & supply

=== Local election ===
Election	Leader	Mayors/Chairs	Councillors	Local level
2022	C. K. Raut	2 / 753	96 / 35,907	Balan-Bihul Rural Municipality; Hanumannagar Kankalini Municipality

== Leadership ==
=== Party portfolios ===
No.	Portfolio	Office holder	Terms in Office	
No.	Portfolio	Office holder	Start	End/Incumbent
1	President	CK Raut	2019	Incumbent
2	Senior Vice President	Er. Basant Kushwaha	2019	Incumbent
3	Vice President	Narendra Prasad Chaudhary	2019	Incumbent
4	General Secretary	Chandan Kumar Singh	2019	Incumbent
5	Deputy General Secretary	Indrajit Kumar Yadav	2019	Incumbent
6	Secretary	Anita Mandal	2019	Incumbent
6	Secretary	Anita Devi Sah	2019	Incumbent
6	Secretary	Bhopendra Prasad Yadav	2019	Incumbent
6	Secretary	Radha Kumari Yadav	2019	Incumbent
6	Secretary	Sanjay Kumar Yadav	2019	Incumbent
6	Secretary	Hemlata Rajak	2019	Incumbent

== See also ==
- People's Socialist Party, Nepal
- Ujyaalo Nepal Party
- 2022 Provincial Assembly of Madhesh Province election
