= People's Socialist Party, Nepal (2020) =

Political party in Nepal

People's Socialist Party, Nepal जनता समाजवादी पार्टी, नेपाल Janatā Samājavādī Pārṭī, Nepāla
- Abbreviation: PSP-N
- Leader: Mahantha Thakur
- Chairperson: Upendra Yadav
- Spokesperson: Ram Kumar Sharma
- Founded: 22 April 2020; 6 years ago
- Merger of: RJPN; SPN
- Headquarters: Balkumari, Lalitpur
- Student wing: Socialist Student Union, Nepal
- Youth wing: Socialist Youth Union, Nepal
- Women's wing: Socialist Women Union, Nepal
- Ideology: Democratic socialism Madheshi interests Secularism
- Political position: Centre-left to left-wing
- Regional affiliation: Network of Social Democracy in Asia
- ECN Status: Limited National Party
- Seats in Pratinidhi Sabha: 0 / 275
- Seats in Rastriya Sabha: 3 / 59
- Seats in Provincial Assemblies: 29 / 550
- Chief Ministers: 0 / 7
- Mayors/Chairs: 34 / 753
- Councillors: 1,048 / 35,011

Election symbol

Party flag

The People's Socialist Party, Nepal (abbr. PSP-N; Nepali: जनता समाजवादी पार्टी, नेपाल), also known as Janata Samajbadi Party, Nepal is the seventh largest political party in Nepal. Since the 2022 local election, the party had been limited to stand only as the third largest party of Madhesh Province after the Nepali Congress and CPN (UML) respectively.

With 9 out of 275 seats in the lower house and 3 out of 59 seats in the upper house National Assembly, the party is the seventh largest political party in the Federal Parliament. While Mahantha Thakur serves as patron of the party, Upendra Yadav serves as the party chairman.

== Ideology ==
The party advocates for identity based federalism and a more inclusive parliament. They also support a more decentralized government structure which guarantees more power to provincial and local governments. The party intends to implement the agreements of the Nepalese Civil War, Madheshi movement and various other movements.

== History ==
=== Formation of first split ===
The Rastriya Janata Party Nepal and Samajbadi Party, Nepal were in constant negotiations throughout 2019 with talks failing or being in limbo because of issues relating to power sharing and Samajbadi Party, Nepal not withdrawing support from the K.P. Oli led government.

Samajbadi Party finally quit the government in late on 24 December 2019 after the Prime minister rejected the party's proposals on constitution amendments while demoting Yadav from the post of Health Minister. The failure to quit the government despite repeated calls before had put a deadlock on the negotiations between the two parties. Hopes of unification suffered a further blow when RJPN announced an electoral alliance with the ruling Nepal Communist Party for the 2020 National Assembly elections while the Samajbadi Party, Nepal announced electoral alliance with Nepali Congress. Negotiations for unification still continued through early 2020 with issues relating to power sharing and leadership still becoming a major sticking point for both parties rather than ideology.

As per trusted sources and national media's, Renu Yadav wanted to split the party with seven other MPs which included Bimal Prasad Shrivastav, Surendra Kumar Yadav, Mohammad Estiyak Rai, Pradeep Yadav, Umashankar Argariya, Kalu Devi Bishwakarma and Renuka Gurung. Though the plan went unsuccess do to last moment merger of Samajbadi Party, Nepal and Rastriya Janata Party Nepal to form People's Socialist Party, Nepal it was highly covered by national medias.

The deadlock finally broke on 23 April 2020 after this incident and the two parties finally reached an agreement for a merger just two days after the government issued an ordinance that amended the Political Party Act which made it possible for a party to split if supported by 40% of either the party's central committee or its parliamentarians, The new party, People's Socialist Party, Nepal was officially registered with the Election Commission on 9 July 2020.

It was formed by the merger of the two parties in Nepal, the Samajbadi Party, Nepal, led by Baburam Bhattarai and Upendra Yadav, and the Rastriya Janata Party Nepal, led by the presidium of Mahantha Thakur and five others.

=== Election year 2023 ===
The party faces a major setback in the 2022 Nepalese local elections when it had to lose majority of places it contested. The party had to lose Hanumannagar Kankalini municipality and Balan Bihul rural municipality to newly formed Janamat Party led by CK Raut. Among these, son of provincial minister Nawal Kishor Sah Sudi lost as mayor in Hanumannagar Kankalini.

Party's leader and chief minister Lalbabu Raut lost his own home town, Jagarnathpur Rural Municipality to Nepali Congress. Even his wife Jalekha Khatun lost as deputy chairperson candidate. Similarly, the party lost its security deposits in various local levels of Madhesh Province and all over Nepal which it had contested for not attaining even 10% vote. Party's candidate for mayor in Janakpur, Lal Kishor Sah could attain only fifth position and lost to Nepali Congress leader Manoj Kumar Sah. As a result, Nepali Congress stood as single largest party in Madhesh Province. As a result, the party was limited to become only the third largest party of Madhesh province being able to win just 28 local levels in province compared to 45 which it had before elections. This was seen as an effect of split in party forming Loktantrik Samajwadi Party and the rise of Janamat Party, Terai Madhesh Loktantrik Party in eastern terai while Janata Pragatisheel Party and Nagrik Unmukti Party in western terai of Nepal.

The party had to bear a huge loss all over Nepal. Party's Chairman Upendra Yadav lost his seat Saptari 2 to CK Raut of Janamat Party. Similarly the party was limited to 6 of 32 seats in Madhesh Province. The party was even limited to third position after Nepali Congress and CPN (UML) respectively in Madhesh Provincial Assembly winning just 16 of 107 seats.

=== Factions and split parties ===
Party	Founded	Leader
Loktantrik Samajwadi Party, Nepal	18 August 2021	Mahantha Thakur
Nagrik Unmukti Party, Nepal	3 January 2022	Resham Lal Chaudhary
Nepal Socialist Party	24 July 2022	Baburam Bhattarai
People's Socialist Party	5 May 2024	Ashok Rai
Janata Loktantrik Party Nepal	2 December 2025	Ashok Yadav

== Organization and structure ==
=== Central working committee ===
The party has 20 membered central working committee.

=== Central committee ===
The party has 400 membered central committee.

== Leadership ==
=== Patron ===
- Mahantha Thakur 2026–present

=== Federal council chairmen ===
- Baburam Bhattarai 2020–2022
- Ashok Rai 2022–2024

=== Executive chairmen ===
- Mahantha Thakur 2020–2021
- Upendra Yadav 2020–present

== Chief ministers ==
=== Madhesh Province ===
No.	Chief Minister	Portrait	Term in office			Legislature	Cabinet	Constituency
No.	Chief Minister	Portrait	Start	End	Tenure	Legislature	Cabinet	Constituency
1 (Note: Raut was appointed chief minister in 2018 while he was a member of FSFN)	Lalbabu Raut		14 February 2018	13 January 2023	4 years, 333 days	1st Provincial Assembly	Raut, 2017	Parsa 1(B)
2	Saroj Kumar Yadav		13 January 2023	7 June 2024	1 year, 146 days	2nd Provincial Assembly	Yadav, 2023	Bara 1 (B)

== Electoral performance ==
=== General election ===
Election	Leader	Party list votes		Seats	Position	Status
Election	Leader	No.	%	Seats	Position	Status
2022	Upendra Yadav	421,313	3.99	12 / 275	6th	In coalition
2026	Upendra Yadav	182,285	1.68	0 / 275	▼7th	Extra parliamentary

=== Provincial election ===
Province	Election	Leader	Party list votes		Seats	Position	Resulting government
Province	Election	Leader	No.	%	Seats	Position	Resulting government
Province 1	2022	Upendra Yadav	61,723	3.25	1 / 93	6th	Coalition government
Madhesh	2022	Upendra Yadav	298,774	14.32	16 / 107	3rd	Coalition government
Lumbini	2022	Upendra Yadav	60,886	3.23	3 / 87	7th	Confidence & supply

=== Local election ===
Election	Leader(s)	Seats	
Election	Leader(s)	Mayor/Chairman	Councillors
2022	Upendra Yadav	30 / 753	1,548 / 35,097

== List of Members of Parliament ==
=== List of Rastriya Sabha members from People's Socialist Party ===
People's Socialist Party (3)
Province	Category	Member	Portfolio & Responsibilities / Remarks
Madhesh	Open	Mohammad Khalid Siddiqui	
Madhesh	Open	Mrigendra Kumar Singh Yadav	
Madhesh	Woman	Puja Chaudhary	

=== List of Pratinidhi Sabha members from People's Socialist Party ===
People's Socialist Party (5)
Constituency/PR group	Member	Portfolio & Responsibilities / Remarks
Bara 2	Upendra Yadav	Parliamentary party leader
Dhanusha 1	Dipak Karki	
Siraha 2	Raj Kishor Yadav	
Khas Arya	Prakash Adhikari	
Khas Arya	Rekha Yadav Thapa	

== See also ==
- Nepali Congress
- Janamat Party
- Nagrik Unmukti Party, Nepal
