= 2nd Madhesh Provincial Assembly =

2022 provincial election in Nepal

←	1st Assembly

Overview
- Legislative body: Madhesh Provincial Assembly
- Jurisdiction: Madhesh Province, Nepal
- Meeting place: District Education Office, Janakpur, Dhanusha District
- Term: 2 January 2023 –
- Election: 2022
- Government: Yadav cabinet, 2025
- Website: pga.p2.gov.np Vacant (4)
- Members: 107
- Speaker: Ram Asish Yadav (NSP, Nepal)
- Deputy Speaker: Babita Devi Raut (JP)
- Leader of the House (Chief Minister): Krishna Prasad Yadav (Nepali Congress)
- Leader of Opposition: Saroj Kumar Yadav (CPN (UML))
- Party control: Government (76): Congress: 22; PSP-N: 20; NCP: 14; Janamat: 12; LSPN: 8; Opposition (25): CPN (UML): 23; NUP: 1; RPP: 1; NFSP : 1

The 2nd Madhesh Provincial Assembly was elected through the provincial elections held on 20 November 2022. The assembly has 64 constituency seats in which members are elected through direct elections and 43 proportional representation party list seats. The term of the assembly is 5 years unless dissolved earlier. The first session of the assembly started on 2 January 2023.

== Leaders ==
=== Officers ===
- Speaker of the Assembly: Hon. Ram Ashish Yadav (People's Socialist Party, Nepal)
- Deputy Speaker of the Assembly: Hon. Babita Devi Raut Ishar (Janamat Party)
- Leader of the House (Chief Minister): Hon. Krishna Prasad Yadav (Nepali Congress)
- Leader of the Opposition: Hon. Saroj Kumar Yadav (CPN (UML))

=== Parliamentary party ===
- Parliamentary party leader of CPN (UML): Hon. Saroj Kumar Yadav
- Parliamentary party leader of Nepali Congress: Hon. Krishna Prasad Yadav
- Parliamentary party leader of People's Socialist Party: Hon. Saroj Yadav
- Parliamentary party leader of Janamat Party: Hon. Mahesh Prasad Yadav
- Parliamentary party leader of Loktantrik Samajwadi Party, Nepal: Hon. Jitendra Prasad Sonal
- Parliamentary party leader of CPN (Maoist Centre): Hon. Bharat Prasad Sah
- Parliamentary party leader of CPN (Unified Socialist): Hon. Govinda Bahadur Neupane

=== Whips ===
- Chief Whip of Janamat Party: Hon. Chandan Kumar Singh

== Composition ==
2nd Madhesh Provincial Assembly

On 5 February 2023, after three independents joined PSP-N, and one each joined CPN (Maoist Centre) and CPN (UML).

After the 2022 provincial election.

Party	Seats					
Party	After election			At present		
Party	FPTP	PR	Total	FPTP	PR	Total
CPN (UML)	15	8	23	15	8	23
Congress	13	9	22	13	9	22
PSP-Nepal	9	7	16	13	7	20 (Note: Including 1 suspended member)
Janamat	6	7	13	5	7	12
Loktantrik Samajwadi	7	2	9	7	2	9
Maoist Centre	4	4	8	3	4	7
Unified Socialist	4	3	7	4	3	7
RPP	0	1	1	0	1	1
Nepal Federal Socialist Party	0	1	1	0	1	1
Nagrik Unmukti	0	1	1	0	1	1
Independent	6	—	6	—	—	—
Vacant	—	—	—	4	—	4
Total	64	43	107	57	43	107

== Members ==
CPN (UML) (25)
Constituency/PR group	Member	Portfolio & Responsibilities
Dhanusha 1 (B)	Ram Chandra Mandal	former speaker of the assembly
Mahottari 4 (A)	Saroj Kumar Yadav	former Chief Minister; Parliamentary party leader; former Minister for Physical Infrastructure Development
Saptari 1 (A)	Raj Kumar Lekhi	former Minister for Law, Justice and Provincial Affairs
Siraha 2 (B)	Satrudhan Prasad Singh	former Minister for Home Affairs and Communication
Rautahat 2 (A)	Mohammad Zaid Alam	Minister for Women, Children, Youth and Sports
Rautahat 3 (A)	Keshav Raya	Elected as Independent; joined CPN (UML) on 3 February 2023; former State minister for Home Affairs and Communications
Siraha 1 (A)	Rajendra Prasad Chaudhary Tharu	
Siraha 3 (A)	Manoj Kumar Singh	
Dhanusha 2 (A)	Lakhan Das Tatma	
Dhanusha 3 (B)	Dipendra Kumar Thakur	
Dhanusha 4 (B)	Hari Narayan Mahato	
Mahottari 1 (A)	Sharada Devi Thapa	
Bara 1 (A)	Triloki Prasad	
Bara 3 (A)	Ravindra Das Shrestha	
Bara 3 (B)	Mohammad Sameer	
Bara 4 (A)	Dev Narayan Tharu	
Madheshi	Jay Chandra Prasad Patel	
Madheshi	Panti Devi Yadav	
Madheshi	Phulo Kumari Devi	
Madheshi, Marwari	Bina Devi Sharma	
Madheshi, Marwari	Rajpati Devi Jaiswal	
Dalit	Palti Devi Mahara	
Muslim	Jainab Khatun	
Indigenous peoples	Manju Kumari Thapa Magar	

Nepali Congress (22)
Constituency/PR group	Member	Portfolio & Responsibilities
Rautahat 1 (B)	Krishna Prasad Yadav	Parliamentary party leader
Saptari 3 (A)	Mohammad Samim	
Dhanusha 1 (A)	Sanjay Kumar Mahato	
Dhanusha 3 (A)	Ram Saroj Yadav	
Dhanusha 4 (A)	Shesh Narayan Yadav	
Sarlahi 2 (A)	Jangilal Ray	
Sarlahi 2 (B)	Kaushal Kishor Ray	
Sarlahi 4 (A)	Birendra Prasad Singh	
Rautahat 1 (A)	Nagendra Sah	
Rautahat 3 (B)	Sunil Kumar Yadav	
Parsa 2 (A)	Shyam Prasad Patel	
Parsa 3 (B)	Janardhan Singh Chhetri	
Parsa 4 (A)	Shankar Prasad Chaudhary	
Madheshi	Kumar Kant Jha	
Madheshi	Rekha Thakur	
Madheshi	Jibachhi Kumari Yadav	
Madheshi, Sudhi	Indu Kumar Sah	
Madheshi, Kamhar	Anjana Pandit	
Dalit	Shakunti Devi	
Dalit, Dhobi	Nilam Kumar Razak	
Indigenous peoples	Mina Kumar Lama	
Muslim	Nurun Mesa	

People's Socialist Party, Nepal (20)
Constituency/PR group	Member	Portfolio & Responsibilities
Bara 1 (B)	Saroj Kumar Yadav	Chief Minister; Parliamentary party leader
Sarlahi 3 (B)	Sanjay Kumar Yadav	Minister for Economic Affairs
Mahottari 2 (B)	Surita Kumari Sah	Elected as Independent; joined PSP-N on 22 January 2023; Minister for Social Development
Parsa 4 (B)	Singhasan Sah Kalwar	Minister for Water Supply and Energy Development
Rautahat 4 (B)	Sheikh Abul Kalam Aazad	State minister for Social Development
Saptari 4 (B)	Anirudhha Kumar Singh	Elected as Independent
Siraha 1 (B)	Raj Kumar Gupta	
Dhanusha 2 (B)	Ram Ashish Yadav	
Mahottari 4 (B)	Saroj Kumar Singh	
Bara 2 (A)	Sarada Sarkar Prasad Kalwar	Elected as Independent; joined the party on 5 February 2023
Bara 2 (B)	Bachha Raut Ahir	
Parsa 1 (B)	Lalbabu Raut	
Parsa 3 (A)	Pramod Kumar Jaiswal	Elected as Independent; joined PSP-N on 22 January 2023
Madheshi, Kayastha	Manish Kumar Suman	
Madheshi	Bindu Kumari Yadav	
Madheshi	Kiran Kumari	
Madheshi, Kanu	Shobha Devi	
Dalit	Lalita Das	
Muslim	Shahida Khatun	
Indigenous peoples	Mamata Devi Mandal	

Janamat Party (13)
Constituency/PR group	Member	Portfolio & Responsibilities
Madheshi, Rajdhov	Babita Kumari Raut Ishar	Deputy Speaker of the assembly
Saptari 2 (B)	Mahesh Prasad Yadav	Parliamentary party leader; Minister for Education, Science and Technology
Madheshi	Basanta Kumar Kushwaha	Minister for Land Management, Agriculture and Cooperatives
Siraha 2 (A)	Sanjay Kumar Yadav	State minister for Land Management, Agriculture and Cooperatives
Madheshi	Chandan Kumar Singh	Chief Whip
Saptari 1 (B)	Saqil Miya	
Saptari 2 (A)	Satish Kumar Singh	
Saptari 3 (B)	Shambhu Kumar Sah	
Siraha 4 (A)	Tribhuwan Sah	
Madheshi	Anita Kumari Shah	
Dalit, Khatve	Ranju Kumari Mandal Khang	
Muslim	Hasina Khatun	
Indigenous peoples	Bhagyashri Kumari Chaudhary	

Loktantrik Samajwadi Party (9)
Constituency/PR group	Member	Portfolio & Responsibilities
Mahottari 3 (A)	Abhiram Sharma	Parliamentary party leader
Siraha 4 (B)	Ram Babu Yadav	
Mahottari 2 (A)	Jayanul Rain	
Mahottari 3 (B)	Rani Kumari Tiwari	
Sarlahi 1 (A)	Upendra Mahato	
Bara 4 (B)	Jitendra Prasad Sonar	
Parsa 2 (B)	Ramesh Prasad Kurmi	
Madheshi	Rupa Kumari Yadav	
Madheshi, Sudhi	Ramita Pradhan	

CPN (Maoist Centre) (9)
Constituency/PR group	Member	Portfolio & Responsibilities
Mahottari 1 (B)	Bharat Prasad Sah	Parliamentary party leader
Sarlahi 3 (A)	Jawaharlal Kushwaha	Elected as Independent; joined the party on 28 December 2022
Sarlahi 4 (B)	Fakeera Mahato	
Rautahat 4 (A)	Yubaraj Bhattarai	
Parsa 1 (A)	Rahabar Ansari	
Madheshi	Sunita Yadav	
Madheshi, Kayastha	Mala Kumari Karna	
Dalit	Sharada Das	
Muslim	Mohammad Razi Haider	

CPN (Unified Socialist) (7)
Constituency/PR group	Member	Portfolio & Responsibilities
Saptari 4 (A)	Govinda Bahadur Neupane	Parliamentary party leader
Sarlahi 1 (B)	Bechi Lungeli	
Siraha 3 (B)	Pramod Kumar Yadav	
Rautahat 2 (B)	Kanish Patel	
Madheshi	Ratneshwar Goit Yadav	
Madheshi, Lohar	Laxmi Devi	
Dalit	Kishori Devi	

Rastriya Prajatantra Party (1)
Constituency/PR group	Member	Portfolio & Responsibilities
Madheshi	Sarita Kumari Thakur	
Former member
Madheshi	Kanchan Bichha	

Nepal Federal Socialist Party (1)
Constituency/PR group	Member	Portfolio & Responsibilities
Muslim	Bimala Ansari Tartrum	

Nagrik Unmukti Party (1)
Constituency/PR group	Member	Portfolio & Responsibilities
Madheshi	Urmila Devi Singh	

=== Changes ===
Constituency/PR group	Outgoing MPA	Party	Date seat vacated	Cause of vacation	Incoming MPA	Party	Date appointed
Madheshi	Kanchan Bichha	RPP	13 May 2026	disciplinary action taken by the party	Sarita Kumari Thakur	RPP	13 May 2026
Dhanusha 1 (B)	Ram Chandra Mandal	CPN (UML)	18 January 2026	Resigned to contest general election			
Parsa 1 (A)	Rahabar Ansari	Maoist Centre	18 January 2026	Resigned to contest general election			
Mahottari 1 (B)	Bharat Prasad Sah	Maoist Centre	19 January 2026	Resigned to contest general election			
Saptari 2 (A)	Satish Kumar Singh	Janamat	19 January 2026	Resigned to contest general election			

=== Defections ===
Constituency/PR group	Member	From	To	Date
Sarlahi 3 (A)	Jawaharlal Kushwaha	Independent	Maoist Centre	28 December 2022
Mahottari 2 (B)	Surita Kumari Sah	Independent	PSP-Nepal	22 January 2023
Parsa 3 (A)	Pramod Kumar Jaiswal	Independent	PSP-Nepal	22 January 2023
Rautahat 3 (A)	Keshav Raya	Independent	CPN (UML)	3 February 2023
Bara 2 (A)	Sarada Sarkar Prasad Kalwar	Independent	PSP-Nepal	5 February 2023
Saptari 4 (B)	Anirudhha Kumar Singh	Independent	PSP-Nepal	

=== Suspensions ===
Constituency/PR group	Member	Party	From	To	Reason
Mahottari 3 (A)	Abhiram Sharma	Loktantrik Samajwadi	30 April 2024	12 October 2026	Life sentence on murder charges
Dhanusha 3 (B)	Dipendra Kumar Thakur	CPN (UML)	10 June 2025	13 February 2026	Corruption charges
Mahottari 4 (B)	Saroj Kumar Singh	PSP-Nepal	12 June 2025	28 August 2025	Corruption charges
Mahottari 4 (B)	Saroj Kumar Singh	PSP-Nepal	17 October 2025		Corruption charges
