= Mahottari 2 =

Parliamentary constituency in Madhesh Province, Nepal

- Parliamentary constituency
- Mahottari 2 in Province No. 2
- Province: Province No. 2
- District: Mahottari District

Current constituency
- Created: 1991
- Party: Rastriya Swatantra Party
- Member of Parliament: Dipak Kumar Sah

Mahottari 2 is one of four parliamentary constituencies of Mahottari District in Nepal. This constituency came into existence on the Constituency Delimitation Commission (CDC) report submitted on 31 August 2017.

== Incorporated areas ==
Mahottari 2 incorporates Mahottari Rural Municipality Loharpatti Municipality, Balwa Municipality, wards 1, 2 and 6–8 of Bhangaha Municipality, ward 6 of Pipra Rural Municipality and ward 6 of Ekdara Rural Municipality.

== Assembly segments ==
It encompasses the following Province No. 2 Provincial Assembly segment

- Mahottari 2(A)
- Mahottari 2(B)

== Members of Parliament ==
=== Parliament/Constituent Assembly ===
Election	Member	Party
1991	Hari Shankar Mishra	Nepali Congress
1994	Mahendra Raya	Rastriya Prajatantra Party
March 1997	Mahendra Raya	Rastriya Prajatantra Party (Chand)
1999	Sharat Singh Bhandari	Nepali Congress
2008	Hari Narayan Yadav	Madheshi Janaadhikar Forum, Nepal
2013	Kiran Yadav	Nepali Congress
2017	Sharat Singh Bhandari	Rastriya Janata Party Nepal
April 2020	Sharat Singh Bhandari	People's Socialist Party, Nepal
August 2021	Sharat Singh Bhandari	Loktantrik Samajwadi Party, Nepal
2026	Dipak Kumar Sah	Rastriya Swatantra Party

=== Provincial Assembly ===
==== 2(A) ====
Election	Member	Party
2017	Jayanul Rain	Rastriya Janata Party Nepal
April 2020	Jayanul Rain	People's Socialist Party, Nepal
August 2021	Jayanul Rain	Loktantrik Samajwadi Party, Nepal

==== 2(B) ====
Election	Member	Party
2017	Surita Kumari Sah	Rastriya Janata Party Nepal
April 2020	Surita Kumari Sah	People's Socialist Party, Nepal
August 2021	Surita Kumari Sah	Loktantrik Samajwadi Party, Nepal

== Election results ==
=== Election in the 2020s ===
==== 2022 general election ====
Candidate	Party	Votes	%
Sharat Singh Bhandari	Loktantrik Samajwadi Party, Nepal	25,190	45.66
Bijay Kumar Singh	Terai Madhesh Loktantrik Party	11,120	20.16
Ram Parichhan Yadav	CPN (UML)	10,258	18.59
Umesh Kumar Yadav	Janamat Party	5,971	10.82
Others		2,627	4.76
Total		55,166	100.00
Majority		14,070	
Loktantrik Samajwadi Party, Nepal hold			

=== Election in the 2010s ===
==== 2017 legislative elections ====
Party	Candidate	Votes
Rastriya Janata Party Nepal	Sharat Singh Bhandari	30,722
Nepali Congress	Kiran Yadav	13,974
CPN (Maoist Centre)	Kaseem Nadaf	3,732
Others		1,743
Invalid votes		3,306
Result	RJPN gain	
Source: Election Commission

==== 2017 Nepalese provincial elections ====
===== 2(A) =====
Party	Candidate	Votes
Rastriya Janata Party Nepal	Jayanul Rain	14,456
Nepali Congress	Sushil Kumar Yadav	6,478
CPN (Maoist Centre)	Raj Kishor Yadav	4,132
Others		502
Invalid votes		1,328
Result	RJPN gain	
Source: Election Commission

===== 2(B) =====
Party	Candidate	Votes
Rastriya Janata Party Nepal	Surita Kumari Sah	15,440
Nepali Congress	Raj Karan Prasad Sah Sudi	6,497
Communist Party of Nepal (Maoist Centre)	Ajay Kumar Yadav	1,708
Others		1,918
Invalid votes		1,368
Result	RJPN gain	
Source: Election Commission

==== 2013 Constituent Assembly election ====
Party	Candidate	Votes
Nepali Congress	Kiran Yadav	7,357
Rastriya Madhesh Samajbadi Party	Jainul Rain	5,521
Terai Madhes Loktantrik Party	Rupa Kumari Yadav	4,048
Sadbhavana Party	Janai Sharan Sah	3,934
CPN (Unified Marxist–Leninist)	Manju Kumari Yadav	2,514
UCPN (Maoist)	Hari Narayan Yadav	2,391
Madheshi Janaadhikar Forum, Nepal	Lal Babu Yadav	2,379
Others		4,184
Result	Congress gain	
Source: NepalNews

=== Election in the 2000s ===
==== 2008 Constituent Assembly election ====
Party	Candidate	Votes
Madheshi Janaadhikar Forum, Nepal	Hari Narayan Yadav	7,457
Independent	Jainul Rain	5,674
Nepali Congress	Mahendra Yadav	5,640
Terai Madhes Loktantrik Party	Arun Kumar Yadav	4,955
CPN (Unified Marxist–Leninist)	Dr. Raj Kishore Shah	4,540
CPN (Maoist)	Ram Pukar Raya Yadav	4,050
Rastriya Prajatantra Party	Chandeshwar Prasad Yadav	2,112
Others		3,728
Invalid votes		3,406
Result	MJFN gain	
Source: Election Commission

=== Election in the 1990s ===
==== 1999 legislative elections ====
Party	Candidate	Votes
Nepali Congress	Sharat Singh Bhandari	17,705
CPN (Unified Marxist–Leninist)	Ram Dayal Mandal	15,397
Rastriya Prajatantra Party	Habib Rain	5,101
Rastriya Prajatantra Party (Chand)	Mahendra Raya	2,818
CPN (Marxist–Leninist)	Ismail Ansari	2,356
Independent	Bikuntha Yadav	2,191
Others		2,637
Invalid Votes		2,341
Result	Congress gain	
Source: Election Commission

==== 1994 legislative elections ====
Party	Candidate	Votes
Rastriya Prajatantra Party	Mahendra Raya	19,181
Nepali Congress	Hari Shankar Mishra	12,830
CPN (Unified Marxist–Leninist)	Ram Dayal Mandal	6,639
Nepal Sadbhawana Party	Ram Chabilal Raya	2,837
Nepal Janabadi Morcha	Narayan Jha	2,089
Others		549
Result	RPP gain	
Source: Election Commission

==== 1991 legislative elections ====
Party	Candidate	Votes
Nepali Congress	Hari Shankar Mishra	13,165
Independent		9,389
Result	Congress gain	

== See also ==
- List of parliamentary constituencies of Nepal
