= Ujjawal Kumar Jha =

Nepalese politician

Honourable Ujjawal Kumar Jha
- उज्ज्वलकुमार झा

Member of Parliament, Pratinidhi Sabha
- Incumbent
- Assumed office 26 March 2026
- Preceded by: Mahantha Thakur
- Constituency: Mahottari 2

Personal details
- Born: 9 January 1993 (age 33) Ekdara, Mahottari District, Madhesh Province
- Party: Rastriya Swatantra Party
- Parent(s): Manoj Kumar Jha (father), Kulanand Jha (grandfather)
- Education: Engineering
- Occupation: Politician, Engineer

Ujjawal Kumar Jha (Nepali: उज्ज्वलकुमार झा) is a Nepalese politician, engineer and a sitting member of Pratinidhi Sabha from Rastriya Swatantra Party. He joined the Rastriya Swatantra Party in 2026 and secured a party ticket to contest 2026 general election from Mahottari 3.

In the 2026 general election, he won from Mahottari 3 with 32,451 votes, defeating Hari Narayan Yadav, a former minister and Ram Aadhar Kapar, veteran leader of CPN (Unified Marxist–Leninist), who contested independently in this election.

== Early life and education ==
Jha was born in Ekdara, Mahottari District on 9 January 1993 in a Maithil Brahmin family.Jha completed his engineering from Visvesvaraya Technological University, Karnataka, India.

== Electoral performance ==
Election	Year	Constituency	Contested for	Political party	Result	Votes	% of votes
Nepal province election	2022	Mahottari 3(B)	Pradesh Sabha member	Independent politician	Lost	5,489	19.42%
Nepal general election	2026	Mahottari 3	Pratinidhi Sabha member	Rastriya Swatantra Party	Won	32,451	54.55%
