= Terai Madhesh Loktantrik Party =

Terai Madhesh Loktantrik Party could refer to these social democratic parties in the Terai and Madhesh regions of Nepal:

- Terai Madhesh Loktantrik Party (2007)
- Terai Madhesh Loktantrik Party (2021)

== See also ==
- Terai Madhes Sadbhavana Party (2013–2017), a merger of Terai Madhesh Loktantrik Party Nepal (splinter of Terai Madhesh Loktantrik Party (2007)) and Rastriya Sadbhavana Party (splinter of Sadbhavana Party)
