= Brikhesh Chandra Lal =

Nepali politician

- वृषेश चन्द्र लाल

Chairman of Terai Madhesh Loktantrik Party
- In office 2022–2025
- Preceded by: Position created
- Succeeded by: Position abolished

Member of Rastriya Sabha
- In office 2017–2019
- Prime Minister: KP Sharma Oli
- Constituency: Madhesh Province

Personal details
- Party: Loktantrik Samajwadi Party, Nepal
- Other political affiliations: Nepali Congress (until 2007)
- Website: brikhesh.org

Brikhesh Chandra Lal (Nepali: वृषेश चन्द्र लाल) is a Nepali politician belonging to Loktantrik Samajwadi Party, Nepal. He is also a former member of Rastriya Sabha and was elected under open category.

He was the founding leader of Terai Madhesh Loktantrik Party and former mayor of Janakpur.

== Political life ==
Lal is former mayor of Janakpur. He's one of those who left Nepali Congress in the year 2007 along with Mahantha Thakur to form regional party named Terai Madhesh Loktantrik Party.

He refounded the party in the year deciding the Loktantrik Samajwadi Party, Nepal 2022 citing that both People's Socialist Party, Nepal and Loktantrik Samajwadi Party, Nepal had been ungenerous and authoritarian while going against the mandate of Madhesh Movement.

== See also ==
- Loktantrik Samajwadi Party, Nepal
- Bijay Kumar Singh
