= Ramita =

Ramita may refer to:

- Ramita Jindal, Indian sports shooter.
- Ramita Pradhan, Nepali politician.
- Maria Ramita Martinez, American potter
- Ramita Navai, British-Iranian journalist, documentary producer and author.
- Ramita Mahapruekpong, former name of Thai actress.
