= Abhiram Sharma =

Nepalese politician

Honourable Abhiram Sharma
- अभिराम शर्मा
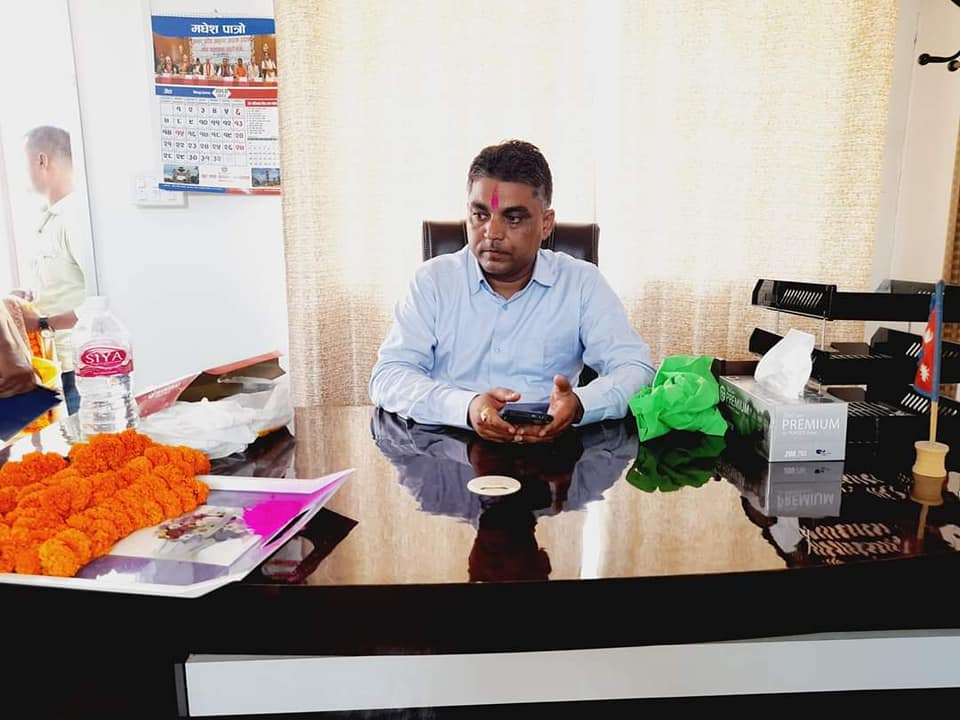

Minister of State for Social Development of Madhesh Province
- In office 25 July 2018 – 6 June 2021
- Minister: Nawal Kishor Sah
- Governor: Ratneshwar Lal Kayastha; Tilak Pariyar; Rajesh Jha; Hari Shankar Mishra
- Chief minister: Lalbabu Raut
- Preceded by: Assembly created

Province Assembly Member of Madhesh Province
- Incumbent
- Assumed office 2017
- Preceded by: N/A
- Constituency: Mahottari 3'A'

Personal details
- Born: 24 January 1977 (age 49)
- Citizenship: Nepalese
- Party: Loktantrik Samajwadi Party, Nepal
- Spouse: Manju Kumari Sharma (m..2002)
- Parent: Mahendra Sharma (father) Mina Devi (mother)
- Occupation: Politician

Abhiram Sharma (Nepali: अभिराम शर्मा) is a Nepalese politician. He is a member of Provincial Assembly of Madhesh Province from Loktantrik Samajwadi Party, Nepal. Sharma, a resident of Jaleshwar, was elected via 2017 Nepalese provincial elections from Mahottari 3(A). He was re-elected via 2022 Nepalese Provincial Elections.

== Personal life ==
Sharma was born in Jaleshwar,Mahottari District on 24th January 1977 in a Bhumihar Family to father Mahendra Sharma & mother Mina Devi.Sharma is married to Manju Kumari Sharma.

== Political life ==
Sharma a resident of Mahottari District was elected to 2017 and 2022 Madhesh Provincial Assembly election from Mahottari 3(A) consecutively. He served as Minister of state for social development for Madesh Pradesh in the Lalbabu Raut Cabinet.He is currently serving as Party parliamentary leader of Loktantrik Samajwadi Party, in Madesh Provincial assembly.

== Electoral history ==
=== 2017 Nepalese provincial elections ===
Party	Candidate	Votes
Rastriya Janata Party Nepal	Abhiram Sharma	9,114
CPN (Maoist Centre)	Ram Aadhar Kaapar	5,510
Independent	Mohammad Mujibul Rahman	3,479
Nepali Congress	Shambhu Narayan Pathak	3,435
Others		1,288
Invalid votes		1,728
Result	RJPN gain	
Source: Election Commission

=== 2022 Madhesh Provincial Assembly election ===
Party	Candidate	Votes
Loktantrik Samajwadi Party, Nepal	Abhiram Sharma	9,892
People's Socialist Party, Nepal (2020)	Dipendra Jha	9,718
Janamat Party	Kuseshwor Sah	4,038
Nepal Sanghiya Samajwadi Party	Firoj Ansari	2,651
Others		2,099
Result	LSPN gain	
Source: Election Comission
