= Mahottari 3 =

Parliamentary constituency in Madhesh Province, Nepal

- Parliamentary constituency
- Mahottari 3 in Province No. 2
- Province: Province No. 2
- District: Mahottari District

Current constituency
- Created: 1991
- Party: Rastriya Swatantra Party
- Member of Parliament: Ujjawal Kumar Jha

Mahottari 3 is one of four parliamentary constituencies of Mahottari District in Nepal. This constituency came into existence on the Constituency Delimitation Commission (CDC) report submitted on 31 August 2017.

== Incorporated areas ==
Mahottari 3 incorporates Matihani Municipality, Jaleshwar Municipality, wards 8–10 of Manara Shiswa Municipality, wards 1–5 and 7 of Pipra Rural Municipality and ward s1–5 of Ekdara Rural Municipality.

== Assembly segments ==
It encompasses the following Province No. 2 Provincial Assembly segment

- Mahottari 3(A)
- Mahottari 3(B)

== Members of Parliament ==
=== Parliament/Constituent Assembly ===
Election	Member	Party
1991	Maheshwar Prasad Singh	Nepali Congress
1994	Ram Vilas Yadav	Rastriya Prajatantra Party
1999	Ram Chandra Tiwari	Nepali Congress
2008	Ganesh Tiwari Nepali	Terai Madhes Loktantrik Party
2013	Ram Dayal Mandal	CPN (Unified Marxist–Leninist)
2017	Mahantha Thakur	Rastriya Janata Party Nepal
April 2020	Mahantha Thakur	People's Socialist Party, Nepal
August 2021	Mahantha Thakur	Loktantrik Samajwadi Party, Nepal
2022	Mahantha Thakur	Loktantrik Samajwadi Party, Nepal
2026	Ujjawal Kumar Jha	Rastriya Swatantra Party

=== Provincial Assembly ===
==== 3(A) ====
Election	Member	Party
2017	Abhiram Sharma	Rastriya Janata Party Nepal
April 2020	Abhiram Sharma	People's Socialist Party, Nepal
August 2021	Abhiram Sharma	Loktantrik Samajwadi Party, Nepal

==== 3(B) ====
Election	Member	Party
2017	Rani Kumari Tiwari	Rastriya Janata Party Nepal
April 2020	Rani Kumari Tiwari	People's Socialist Party, Nepal
August 2021	Rani Kumari Tiwari	Loktantrik Samajwadi Party, Nepal

== Election results ==
=== Election in the 2020s ===
==== 2022 general election ====
Candidate	Party	Votes	%
Mahantha Thakur	Loktantrik Samajwadi Party, Nepal	16,375	29.56
Hari Narayan Yadav	People's Socialist Party, Nepal	14,325	25.86
Ram Adhar Kapar	Independent	12,733	22.98
Ilias Ansari	Nepal Federal Socialist Party	4,949	8.93
Mrigendra Yadav	Janamat Party	4,252	7.67
Brikhesh Chandra Lal	Terai Madhesh Loktantrik Party	1,083	1.95
Others		1,686	3.04
Total		55,403	100.00
Majority		2,050	
Loktantrik Samajwadi Party, Nepal hold			

=== Election in the 2010s ===
==== 2017 legislative elections ====
Party	Candidate	Votes
Rastriya Janata Party Nepal	Mahantha Thakur	26,845
CPN (Unified Marxist–Leninist)	Bijay Kumar Chaudhary	8,676
Independent	Chandeshwar Jha	4,020
Bahujan Shakti Party	Jogendra Mahato	1,884
Nepal Federal Socialist Party	Yusuf Safi	1,241
Others		2,196
Invalid votes		4,089
Result	RJPN gain	
Source: Election Commission

==== 2017 Nepalese provincial elections ====
===== 3(A) =====
Party	Candidate	Votes
Rastriya Janata Party Nepal	Abhiram Sharma	9,114
CPN (Maoist Centre)	Ram Aadhar Kaapar	5,510
Independent	Mohammad Mujibul Rahman	3,479
Nepali Congress	Shambhu Narayan Pathak	3,435
Others		1,288
Invalid votes		1,728
Result	RJPN gain	
Source: Election Commission

===== 3(B) =====
Party	Candidate	Votes
Rastriya Janata Party Nepal	Rani Kumari Tiwari	7,430
Independent	Suresh Sah Sonar	5,598
Nepali Congress	Pawan Sah	1,921
Bahujan Shakti Party	Sakhi Chandra Yadav	1,610
Independent	Tej Narayan Ray	1,216
CPN (Unified Marxist-Leninist)	Bijay Kumar Karna	1,123
Others		3,652
Invalid votes		2,085
Result	RJPN gain	
Source: Election Commission

==== 2013 Constituent Assembly election ====
Party	Candidate	Votes
CPN (Unified Marxist–Leninist)	Ram Dayal Mandal	7,849
Nepali Congress	Ram Chandra Tiwari	4,806
UCPN (Maoist)	Ram Aadhar Kaapar	4,474
Rastriya Madhesh Samajbadi Party	Hari Prasad Mandal	4,425
Terai Madhes Loktantrik Party	Ram Shankar Mishra	4,099
Madheshi Janaadhikar Forum, Nepal	Krishna Shankar Sah	1,852
Others		5,969
Result	CPN (UML) gain	
Source: NepalNews

=== Election in the 2000s ===
==== 2008 Constituent Assembly election ====
Party	Candidate	Votes
Terai Madhes Loktantrik Party	Ganesh Tiwari Nepali	11,390
CPN (Unified Marxist–Leninist)	Ram Dayal Mandal	11,353
Nepali Congress	Ram Chandra Tiwari	4,817
CPN (Maoist)	Arbinda Das	3,464
Independent	Mohammad Azim Rain	1,630
Madheshi Janaadhikar Forum, Nepal	Rabindra Thakur	1,275
Others		4,591
Invalid votes		3,097
Result	TMLP gain	
Source: Election Commission

=== Election in the 1990s ===
==== 1999 legislative elections ====
Party	Candidate	Votes
Nepali Congress	Ram Chandra Tiwari	20,486
Rastriya Prajatantra Party	Ram Vilas Yadav	12,154
Rastriya Prajatantra Party (Chand)	Deep Narayan Shah	6,062
CPN (Unified Marxist–Leninist)	Ganesh Nepali	5,845
CPN (Marxist–Leninist)	Raj Kishor Yadav	1,616
Others		2,078
Invalid Votes		1,174
Result	Congress gain	
Source: Election Commission

==== 1994 legislative elections ====
Party	Candidate	Votes
Rastriya Prajatantra Party	Ram Vilas Yadav	22,693
Nepali Congress	Maheshwar Prasad Singh	11,414
CPN (Unified Marxist–Leninist)	Tej Narayan Yadav	7,701
Others		3,043
Result	RPP gain	
Source: Election Commission

==== 1991 legislative elections ====
Party	Candidate	Votes
Nepali Congress	Maheshwar Prasad Singh	10,406
CPN (Democratic)		6,512
Result	Congress gain	

== See also ==
- List of parliamentary constituencies of Nepal
