= Jayanul Rain =

Nepalese politician

Honourable Jayanul Rain
- जयनूल राईन

Province Assembly Member of Madhesh Province
- Incumbent
- Assumed office 2017
- Preceded by: N/A
- Constituency: Mahottari 2 (constituency)

Personal details
- Born: November 20, 1966 (age 59)
- Party: Loktantrik Samajwadi Party, Nepal
- Occupation: Politician

Jayanul Rain (Nepali: जयनूल राईन) is a Nepalese politician. He is a member of Provincial Assembly of Madhesh Province from Loktantrik Samajwadi Party, Nepal. Rain, a resident of Balawa Municipality, was elected via 2017 Nepalese provincial elections from Mahottari 2(A).

== Electoral history ==
=== 2017 Nepalese provincial elections ===
Party	Candidate	Votes
Rastriya Janata Party Nepal	Jayanul Rain	14,456
Nepali Congress	Sushil Kumar Yadav	6,478
CPN (Maoist Centre)	Raj Kishor Yadav	4,132
Others		502
Invalid votes		1,328
Result	RJPN gain	
Source: Election Commission
