= Sharvodaya Party =

Sharvodaya Party सर्वोदय पार्टी
- Chairperson: Dipak Kumar Sah
- Founded: 15 October 2025; 7 months ago
- Split from: Janamat Party
- Headquarters: Kathmandu
- Ideology: Democratic socialism Federalism
- Political position: Centre-left to left-wing
- ECN Status: National Party
- Seats in Pratinidhi Sabha: 0 / 275
- Seats in Rastriya Sabha: 0 / 59
- Seats in Provincial Assemblies: 0 / 550
- Chief Ministers: 0 / 7
- Mayors/Chairs: 0 / 753
- Councillors: 0 / 35,011
- Number of provinces in government: 0 / 7

The Sharvodaya Party (Nepali: सर्वोदय पार्टी) is a Nepalese political party. The party led by Dipak Shah was formed after a split in Janamat Party, criticizing the authoritarian leadership of CK Raut and his brother Jay Kant Raut.

The party was later joined by members of Madhesh Provincial Assembly including chief minister of Madhesh province Satish Kumar Singh and minister Tribhuwan Sah.

== Leadership ==
=== Chairman ===
- Dipak Kumar Sah (2025–present)
