= Mahottari =

Mahottari may refer to:

- Mahottari District, Nepal
- Mahottari Rural Municipality, Mahottari District, Nepal
