= Manju Kumari Thapa Magar =

Nepalese politician

Honourable Manju Kumari Thapa Magar
- मंजु कुमारी थापा मगर

Province Assembly Member of Madhesh Province
- Incumbent
- Assumed office 2023
- Constituency: Party list

Personal details
- Party: CPN (UML)
- Occupation: Politician

Manju Kumari Thapa Magar (Nepali: मंजु कुमारी थापा मगर) is a Nepalese politician. She is serving as an elected member of Provincial Assembly of Madhesh Province belonging to the Communist Party of Nepal (Unified Marxist–Leninist).

Magar is sworn as an assembly member under Indigenous peoples category.
