= 2022 Nepalese provincial elections =

Provincial election in Nepal

- 20 November 2022

All 550 seats in the 7 provincial assemblies
- Registered: 17,988,570
- Turnout: 61.36%
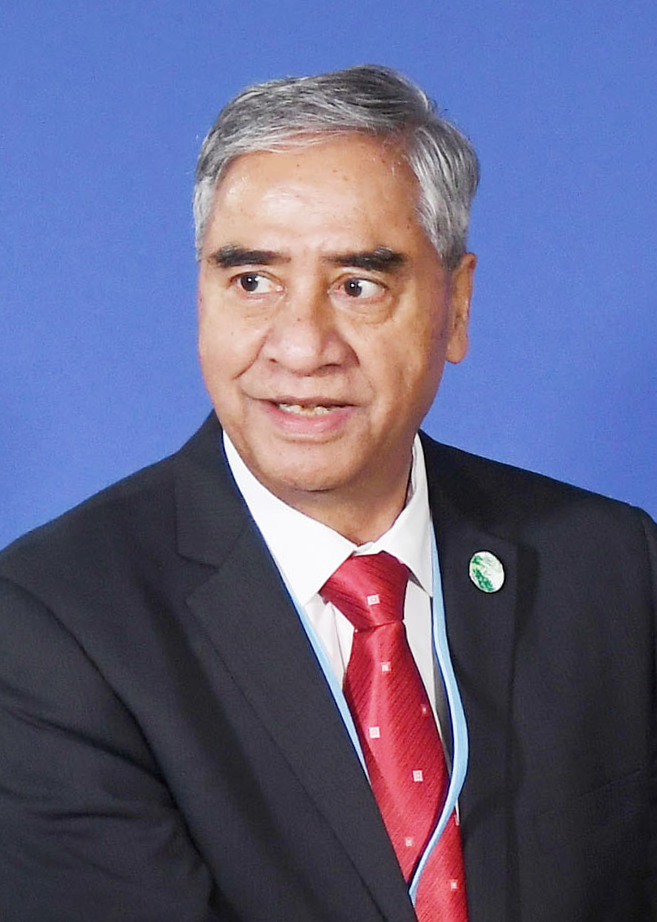

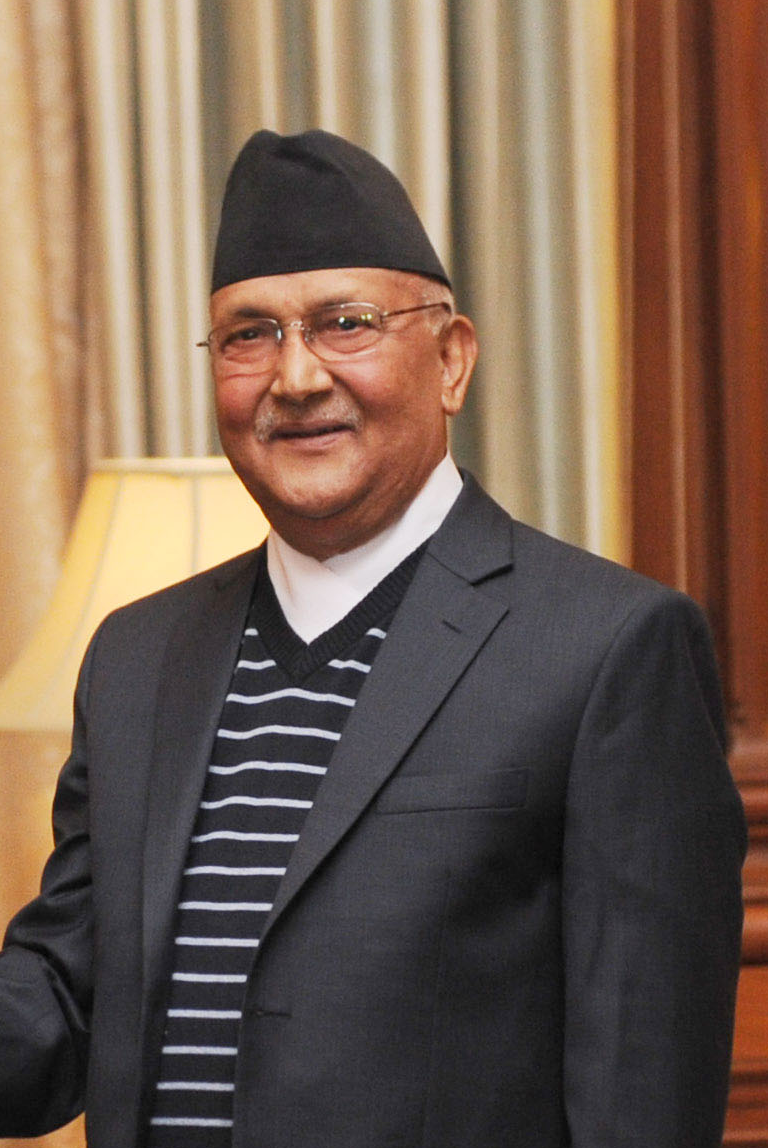

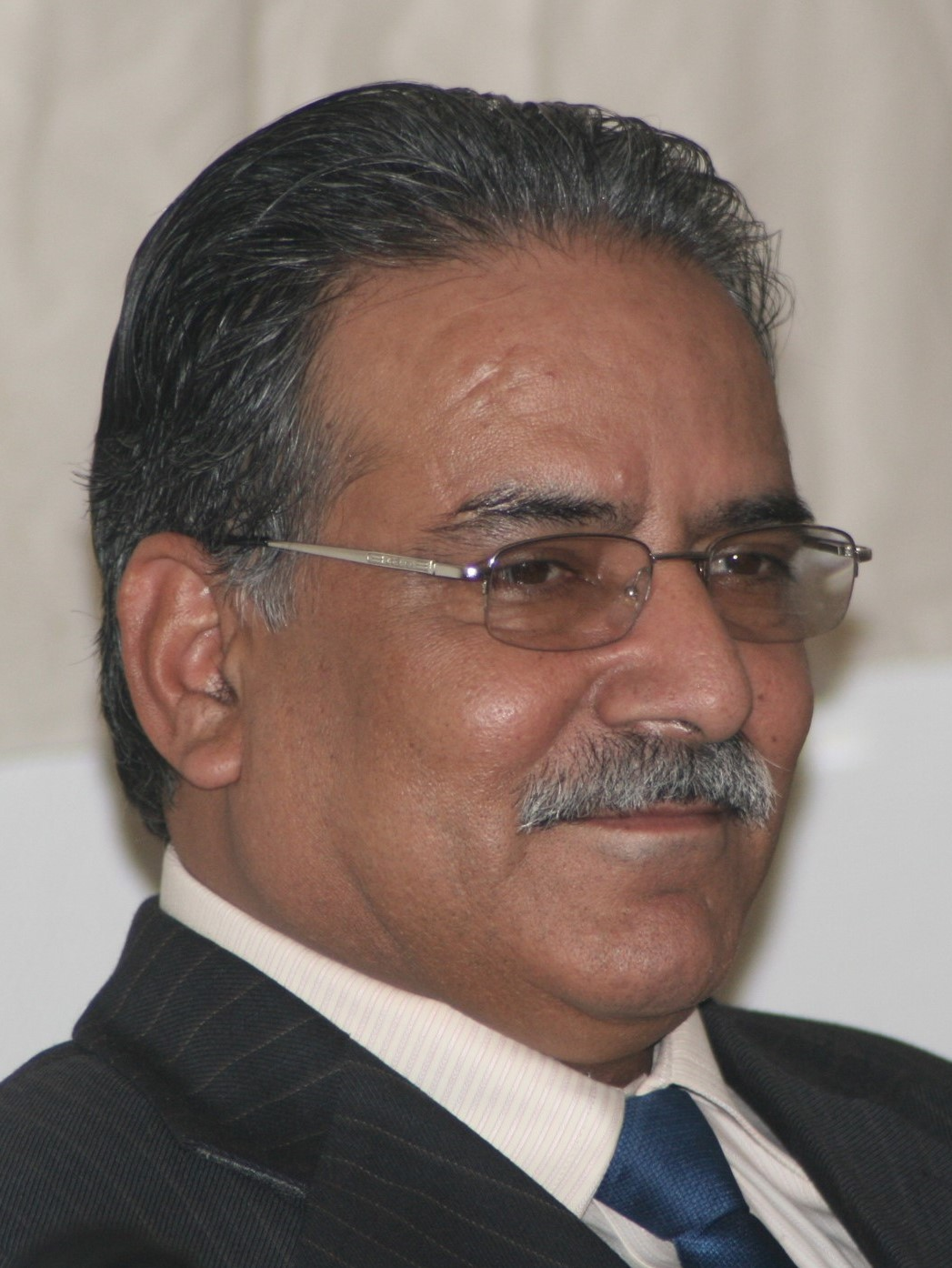

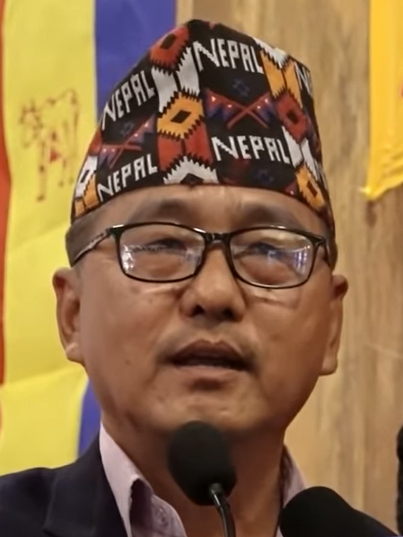

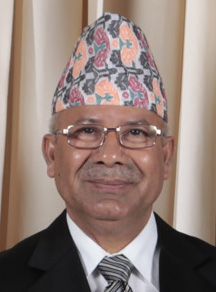

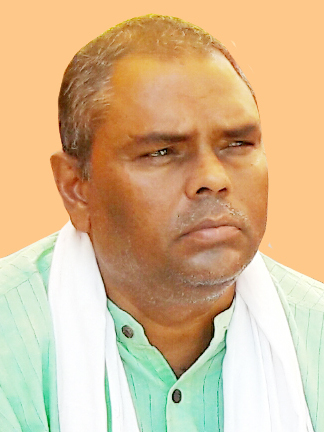

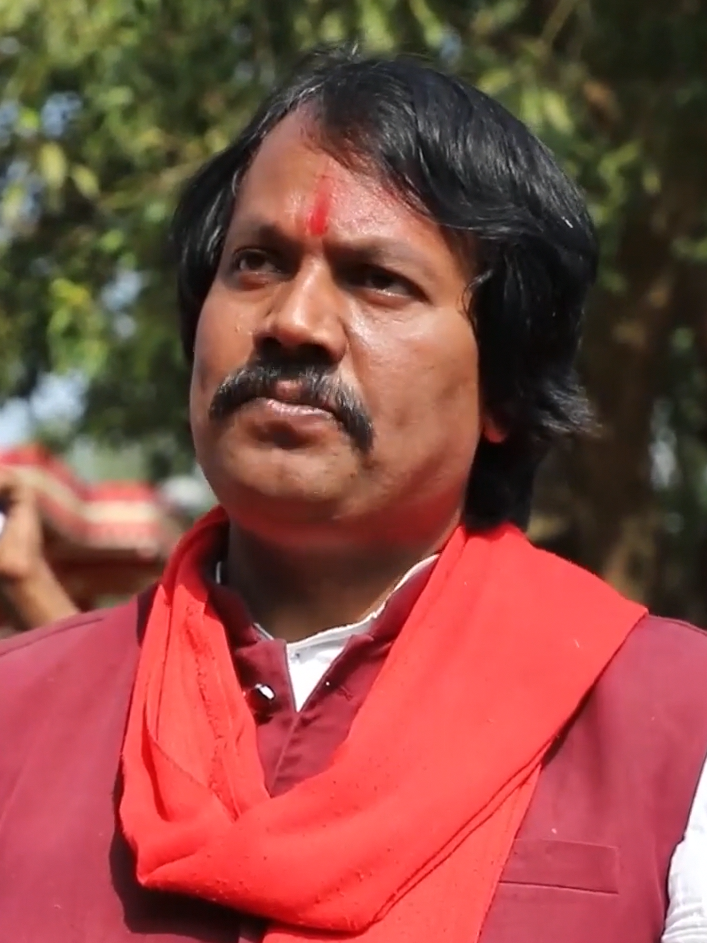

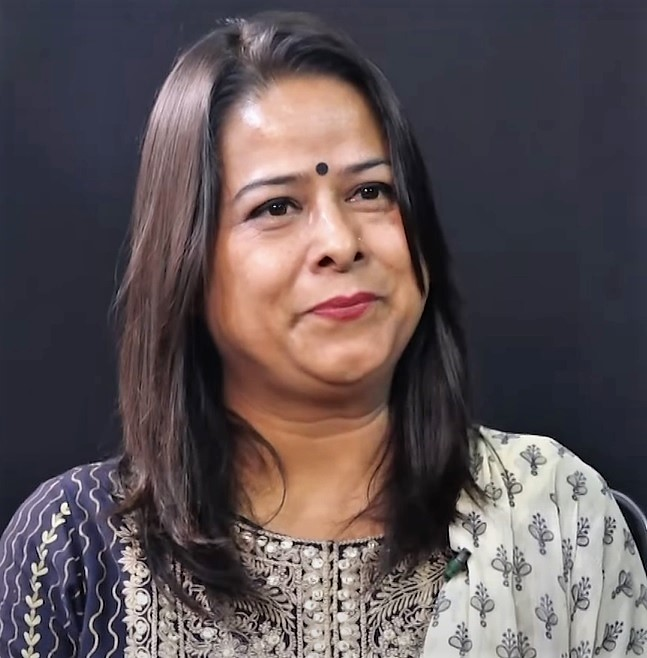

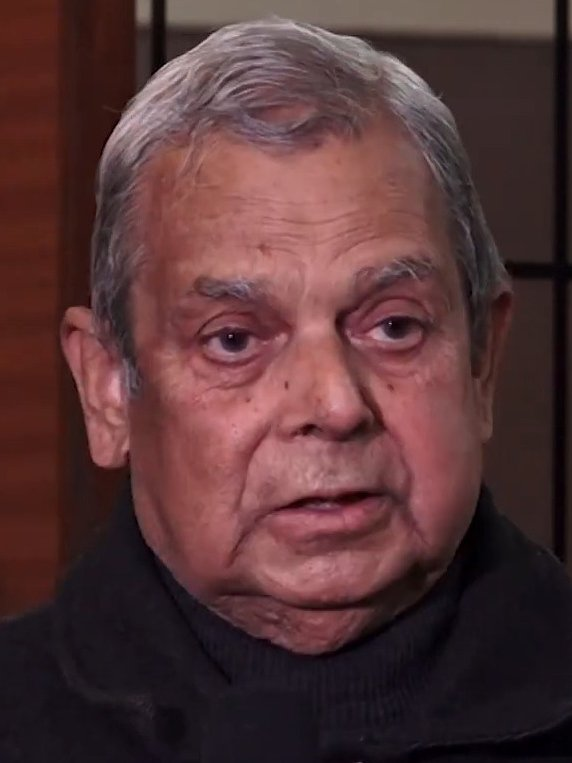
	First party	Second party	Third party
Leader	Sher Bahadur Deuba	K. P. Sharma Oli	Pushpa Kamal Dahal
Party	Congress	CPN (UML)	Maoist Centre
Leader since	7 March 2016	July 2014	May 1999
Last election	113	243	108
Seats won	174	161	83
Seat change	▲61	▼82	▼25
	Fourth party	Fifth party	Sixth party
Leader	Rajendra Lingden	Madhav Kumar Nepal	Upendra Yadav
Party	RPP	Unified Socialist	PSP-Nepal
Leader since	5 December 2021	18 August 2021	8 June 2020
Last election	3	New party	New party
Seats won	27	24	20
Seat change	▲24	▲24	▲20
	Seventh party	Eighth party	Ninth party
Leader	CK Raut	Ranjeeta Shrestha	Mahantha Thakur
Party	Janamat	Nagrik Unmukti	Loktantrik Samajwadi
Leader since	18 March 2019	3 January 2022	18 August 2021
Last election	New party	New party	New party
Seats won	16	13	12
Seat change	▲16	▲13	▲12

Provincial assembly elections were held in Nepal on 20 November 2022 along with the general election. 330 seats in the seven provincial assemblies will be elected by first-past-the-post voting and 220 by proportional representation.

== Electoral system ==
The 550 members of the provincial assemblies will be elected by two methods; 330 will be elected from single-member constituencies by first-past-the-post voting and 220 seats will be elected by closed list proportional representation for parties gathering more than 1.5% of the votes. Each voter will get separate ballot papers for the two methods.

=== Eligibility to vote ===
To vote in the general election, one must be:

- on the electoral roll
- aged 18
- a citizen of Nepal
- of sound mind
- not ineligible as per federal election fraud and punishment laws

== Timetable ==
The key dates are listed below:

4 August	Last date to register to be on electoral roll
4 August	Cabinet announces election date
16 August	Last day for party registration at Election Commission
17 September	Tenure of provincial assembly ends
18-19 September	Parties submit preliminary closed list for proportional representation
28 September	Election code of conduct starts
9 October	Candidate nomination for first past the post
26 October	Closed list for proportional representation finalized and published
20 November	Election day
23 November	TBD

== Competing parties ==
In the table below, green shading indicates that the party ran a list in the indicated province. The number in each box indicates how many first-past-the-post candidates the party ran in the indicated province.

Party	Province						
Party	Province 1	Madhesh	Bagmati	Gandaki	Lumbini	Karnali	Sudurpashchim
CPN (Unified Marxist–Leninist)	52	33	65	34	47	24	30
Nepali Congress	26	26	42	21	34	13	18
CPN (Maoist Centre)	19	17	24	12	18	10	12
CPN (Unified Socialist)	11	17	12	6	8	6	6
People's Socialist Party	35	35	32	12	19	5	2
Loktantrik Samajwadi Party	23	18	8	-	23	-	5
Nepal Socialist Party	-	-	-	1	-	-	-
Rastriya Prajatantra Party	44	58	65	29	35	21	27
Bibeksheel Sajha Party	-	2	1	-	-	-	-
Nepal Majdoor Kisan Party	9	18	58	-	12	12	13
Rastriya Janamorcha	-	-	1	1	3	1	-
Nepal Federal Socialist Party	4	13	-	-	-	-	-
Sanghiya Loktantrik Rastriya Manch	35	1	5	-	-	-	5
Aamul Pariwartan Masiha Party Nepal	-	-	4	1	-	-	-
Bahujan Ekata Party Nepal	-	21	-	-	-	-	-
Bahujan Samaj Party Nepal	-	1	-	-	-	-	-
Bahujan Shakti Party	1	5	-	-	1	-	-
Communist Party of Nepal	-	6	-	-	-	-	-
CPN Maoist Socialist	1	-	1	2	-	1	2
CPN (Marxist–Leninist)	5	2	9	-	-	-	1
CPN (Paribartan)	-	-	1	-	-	-	-
CPN Marxist (Pushpalal)	1	-	1	-	-	1	-
CPN (Socialist)	-	-	-	-	-	-	-
Gandhibadi Party Nepal	-	2	-	-	-	-	-
Hamro Nepali Party	21	17	22	10	11	1	4
Janajagaran Party Nepal	-	-	-	-	-	-	-
Janamat Party	12	58	1	1	18	-	-
Janasamajbadi Party	-	2	7	1	4	-	-
Khambuwan Rastriya Morcha Nepal	2	-	-	-	-	-	-
Kirat Khambhuwan Sajha Party	2	-	-	-	-	-	-
Maulik Jarokilo Party	4	1	5	4	1	-	2
Mongol National Organisation	41	4	37	28	33	-	1
Nagrik Unmukti Party	5	9	2	2	22	-	15
Nationalist People's Party	1	2	4	2	2	-	1
Nepal Aama Party	-	-	5	-	1	-	-
Nepali Congress (B.P.)	6	7	12	6	-	1	3
Nepal Dalit Party	-	-	-	1	1	-	-
Nepali Janata Dal	-	1	-	-	-	-	-
Nepal Janata Party	-	7	-	-	4	-	-
Nepalka Lagi Nepali Party	-	3	5	1	-	-	2
Nepal Loktantrik Party	5	8	1	-	3	1	4
Nepal Naulo Janwadi Party	-	-	1	-	-	-	-
Nepal Sadbhawana Party	1	5	-	-	-	-	-
Nepal Sushashan Party	-	8	6	2	-	-	-
People's Progressive Party	2	16	-	-	2	-	-
Pichhadibarga Nishad Dalit Janajati Party	-	1	-	-	-	-	-
Punarjagaran Party Nepal	-	-	-	-	-	-	-
Rastriya Janamukti Party	19	5	7	11	21	1	-
Rastriya Mukti Andolan Nepal	-	-	1	-	-		-
Rastriya Nagarik Party	-	-	2	-	-	-	-
Rastriya Prajatantra Party Nepal	15	25	21	12	7	3	4
Rastriya Sadbhawana Party	-	1	-	-	-	-	-
Rastriya Samajwadi Party, Nepal	-	-	-	-	-	-	-
Sachet Nepali Party	2	-	4	-	-	-	-
Sajha Party, Nepal	-	-	-	-	-	-	-
Samajik Ekata Party	1	-	-	1	-	-	-
Sanghiya Loktantrik Rastriya Manch (Tharuhat)	-	-	-	-	1	-	-
Tamangsaling Loktantrik Party	-	-	4	-	-	-	-
Terai Madhesh Loktantrik Party	-	4	-	-	-	-	-
Independents	105	547	192	34	164	16	36
Constituencies	56	64	66	36	52	24	32

== Results ==
=== Overall ===
Party	Party list			Constituency			Total seats	+/–
Party	Votes	%	Seats	Votes	%	Seats	Total seats	+/–
Nepali Congress	2,747,295	26.75	63			111	174	▲61
Communist Party of Nepal (Unified Marxist–Leninist)	3,009,284	29.30	70			91	161	▼82
Communist Party of Nepal (Maoist Centre)—Nepal Socialist Party	1,221,836	11.90	29			54	83	▼25
Rastriya Prajatantra Party	795,481	7.75	17			11	28	▲24
Communist Party of Nepal (Unified Socialist)	375,315	3.65	9			15	24	New
People's Socialist Party, Nepal	442,834	4.31	9			11	20	▼48
Janamat Party	446,961	4.35	9			7	16	New
Nagrik Unmukti Party	292,265	2.85	6			7	13	New
Loktantrik Samajwadi Party, Nepal	162,133	1.58	3			9	12	New
Nepal Workers Peasants Party	85,815	0.84	2			1	3	▲1
Hamro Nepali Party	136,431	1.33	1			1	2	New
Rastriya Janamorcha	56,119	0.55	1			0	1	▼3
Nepal Federal Socialist Party	54,369	0.53	1			0	1	Steady
Others	443,417	4.32	0			0	0	▼4
Independents						12	12	▲9
Total	10,269,555	100.00	220			330	550	–
Valid votes	10,269,555	100.00						
Invalid/blank votes	0	0.00						
Total votes	10,269,555	100.00						
Registered voters/turnout	17,988,570	57.09		17,988,570	–			

== Koshi Province ==
Party	Party list			Constituency			Total seats	+/–
Party	Votes	%	Seats	Votes	%	Seats	Total seats	+/–
Communist Party of Nepal (Unified Marxist–Leninist)	665,460	35.04	15			25	40	▲3
Nepali Congress	562,956	29.64	12			17	29	▲8
Rastriya Prajatantra Party	198,511	10.45	4			2	6	▲5
Communist Party of Nepal (Maoist Centre)―Nepal Socialist Party	181,245	9.54	4			9	13	▼2
People's Socialist Party, Nepal	61,723	3.25	1			0	1	▼2
Communist Party of Nepal (Unified Socialist)	55,957	2.95	1			3	4	▼6
Sanghiya Loktantrik Rastriya Manch	26,531	1.40	0			0	0	▼1
Hamro Nepali Party	26,071	1.37	0			0	0	–
Mongol National Organisation	25,387	1.34	0			0	0	New
Janamat Party	24,513	1.29	0			0	0	New
Nagrik Unmukti Party	12,155	0.64	0			0	0	New
CPN (Marxist–Leninist)	7,268	0.38	0			0	0	–
Loktantrik Samajwadi Party, Nepal	6,352	0.33	0			0	0	–
Rastriya Janamukti Party	5,937	0.31	0			0	0	New
Nepal Aama Party―Nepal Naulo Janwadi Party―Sachet Nepali Party	3,449	0.18	0			0	0	New
Rastriya Prajatantra Party Nepal	3,391	0.18	0			0	0	New
Nepal Loktantrik Party	3,282	0.17	0			0	0	New
Aamul Pariwartan Masiha Party Nepal	2,708	0.14	0			0	0	–
Nepalka Lagi Nepali Party	2,550	0.13	0			0	0	New
Khambuwan Rastriya Morcha Nepal	2,455	0.13	0			0	0	New
Nepali Janata Dal	2,315	0.12	0			0	0	–
Janajagaran Party Nepal	2,105	0.11	0			0	0	New
Nepali Congress (B.P.)	2,058	0.11	0			0	0	–
Janasamajbadi Party	1,901	0.10	0			0	0	–
Nepal Workers Peasants Party	1,882	0.10	0			0	0	New
Kirat Khambhuwan Sajha Party	1,784	0.09	0			0	0	New
Nepal Federal Socialist Party	1,530	0.08	0			0	0	New
Maulik Jarokilo Party	1,506	0.08	0			0	0	New
Communist Party of Nepal (Socialist)―Samajik Ekata Party	1,308	0.07	0			0	0	–
Communist Party of Nepal	1,171	0.06	0			0	0	–
Nepal Janata Party	789	0.04	0			0	0	–
Bibeksheel Sajha Party	789	0.04	0			0	0	New
Communist Party of Nepal Maoist Socialist	738	0.04	0			0	0	New
Nationalist People's Party	569	0.03	0			0	0	New
Sanghiya Loktantrik Rastriya Manch (Tharuhat)	507	0.03	0			0	0	New
Bahujan Shakti Party	291	0.02	0			0	0	New
Communist Party of Nepal Marxist (Pushpalal)			0			0	0	New
People's Progressive Party			0			0	0	New
Nepal Sadbhawana Party			0			0	0	New
Independents			0			0	0	–
Total	1,899,144	100.00	37			56	93	–
Valid votes	1,899,144	100.00						
Invalid/blank votes	0	0.00						
Total votes	1,899,144	100.00						
Registered voters/turnout	3,396,865	55.91		3,396,865	–			

== Madhesh Province ==
Party	Party list			Constituency			Total seats	+/–
Party	Votes	%	Seats	Votes	%	Seats	Total seats	+/–
Nepali Congress	400,144	19.18	9			13	22	▲4
Communist Party of Nepal (Unified Marxist–Leninist)	351,768	16.86	8			15	23	▲15
Janamat Party	329,177	15.78	7			6	13	New
People's Socialist Party, Nepal	298,774	14.32	7			9	16	▼20
Communist Party of Nepal (Maoist Centre)―Nepal Socialist Party	180,860	8.67	4			4	8	Steady
Communist Party of Nepal (Unified Socialist)	113,915	5.46	3			4	7	▼6
Loktantrik Samajwadi Party, Nepal	113,364	5.43	2			7	9	▼7
Rastriya Prajatantra Party	65,054	3.12	1			0	1	▲1
Nepal Federal Socialist Party	50,188	2.41	1			0	1	Steady
Nagrik Unmukti Party	49,705	2.38	1			0	1	New
Bahujan Ekata Party Nepal	20,324	0.97	0			0	0	New
Nepal Naulo Janbadi Party―Nepal Aama Party―Nepal Sushashan Party―Sachet Nepali Party	11,509	0.55	0			0	0	New
Hamro Nepali Party	11,398	0.55	0			0	0	New
CPN (Marxist–Leninist)	9,951	0.48	0			0	0	–
Nepal Loktantrik Party	8,287	0.40	0			0	0	New
Pichhadibarga Nishad Dalit Janajati Party	7,104	0.34	0			0	0	New
Bahujan Shakti Party	6,686	0.32	0			0	0	New
Rastriya Prajatantra Party Nepal	6,522	0.31	0			0	0	–
Nepal Janata Party	5,461	0.26	0			0	0	New
Terai Madhesh Loktantrik Party	5,367	0.26	0			0	0	New
People's Progressive Party	5,340	0.26	0			0	0	New
Nepal Sadbhawana Party	4,817	0.23	0			0	0	New
Nepali Janata Dal	3,679	0.18	0			0	0	–
Communist Party of Nepal	3,576	0.17	0			0	0	–
Mongol National Organisation	2,808	0.13	0			0	0	New
Nepal Workers Peasants Party	2,746	0.13	0			0	0	–
Nepali Congress (B.P.)	2,622	0.13	0			0	0	–
Sanghiya Loktantrik Rastriya Manch (Tharuhat)	2,588	0.12	0			0	0	New
Janasamajbadi Party	2,128	0.10	0			0	0	New
Nepalka Lagi Nepali Party	1,945	0.09	0			0	0	–
Rastriya Janamukti Party	1,870	0.09	0			0	0	New
Bibeksheel Sajha Party	1,812	0.09	0			0	0	–
Communist Party of Nepal (Socialist)―Samajik Ekata Party	1,623	0.08	0			0	0	New
Sanghiya Loktantrik Rastriya Manch	1,497	0.07	0			0	0	New
Nationalist People's Party	1,141	0.05	0			0	0	New
Bahujan Samaj Party Nepal	548	0.03	0			0	0	New
Gandhibadi Party Nepal			0			0	0	New
Maulik Jarokilo Party			0			0	0	New
Rastriya Sadbhawana Party			0			0	0	New
Independents			0			6	6	▲6
Total	2,086,298	100.00	43			64	107	–
Valid votes	2,086,298	100.00						
Invalid/blank votes	0	0.00						
Total votes	2,086,298	100.00						
Registered voters/turnout	3,386,628	61.60		3,386,628	–			

== Bagmati Province ==
Party	Party list			Constituency			Total seats	+/–
Party	Votes	%	Seats	Votes	%	Seats	Total seats	+/–
Communist Party of Nepal (Unified Marxist–Leninist)	594,521	30.69	14			13	27	▼15
Nepali Congress	494,261	25.52	12			25	37	▲15
Communist Party of Nepal (Maoist Centre)―Nepal Socialist Party	285,276	14.73	7			14	21	▼2
Rastriya Prajatantra Party	275,562	14.23	6			7	13	▲11
Nepal Workers Peasants Party	68,796	3.55	2			1	3	▲1
Communist Party of Nepal (Unified Socialist)	68,101	3.52	2			5	7	▼6
Hamro Nepali Party	47,893	2.47	1			1	2	New
Nepal Naulo Janwadi Party―Nepal Aama Party―Nepal Sushashan Party―Sachet Nepali Party	15,533	0.80	0			0	0	–
People's Socialist Party, Nepal	10,948	0.57	0			0	0	▼1
Mongol National Organisation	10,561	0.55	0			0	0	–
CPN (Marxist–Leninist)	6,517	0.34	0			0	0	–
Janamat Party	5,848	0.30	0			0	0	New
Rastriya Prajatantra Party Nepal	5,804	0.30	0			0	0	New
Bibeksheel Sajha Party	5,011	0.26	0			0	0	New
Nepalka Lagi Nepali Party	4,813	0.25	0			0	0	New
Nagrik Unmukti Party	3,581	0.18	0			0	0	New
Nepali Congress (B.P.)	3,182	0.16	0			0	0	–
Aamul Pariwartan Masiha Party Nepal	2,778	0.14	0			0	0	–
Communist Party of Nepal (Socialist)―Samajik Ekata Party	2,545	0.13	0			0	0	New
Rastriya Janamorcha	2,205	0.11	0			0	0	–
Rastriya Janamukti Party	1,993	0.10	0			0	0	–
Punarjagaran Party Nepal	1,968	0.10	0			0	0	New
Janasamajbadi Party	1,790	0.09	0			0	0	–
Sajha Party, Nepal	1,741	0.09	0			0	0	New
Nepali Janata Dal	1,666	0.09	0			0	0	–
Janajagaran Party Nepal	1,530	0.08	0			0	0	New
Sanghiya Loktantrik Rastriya Manch	1,447	0.07	0			0	0	New
Maulik Jarokilo Party	1,412	0.07	0			0	0	New
Loktantrik Samajwadi Party, Nepal	1,411	0.07	0			0	0	New
Sanghiya Loktantrik Rastriya Manch (Tharuhat)	1,155	0.06	0			0	0	–
Tamangsaling Loktantrik Party	1,144	0.06	0			0	0	–
Communist Party of Nepal Maoist Socialist	1,068	0.06	0			0	0	Ne
Nepal Janata Party	916	0.05	0			0	0	–
People's Progressive Party	817	0.04	0			0	0	New
Nationalist People's Party	816	0.04	0			0	0	New
Rastriya Nagarik Party	572	0.03	0			0	0	–
Communist Party of Nepal (Paribartan)	527	0.03	0			0	0	New
Nepal Loktantrik Party	479	0.02	0			0	0	New
Nepal Federal Socialist Party	472	0.02	0			0	0	New
Bahujan Shakti Party	183	0.01	0			0	0	New
Rastriya Samajbadi Party, Nepal	175	0.01	0			0	0	–
Communist Party of Nepal Marxist (Pushpalal)			0			0	0	New
Rastriya Mukti Andolan Nepal			0			0	0	–
Independents			0			0	0	–
Total	1,937,018	100.00	44			66	110	–
Valid votes	1,937,018	100.00						
Invalid/blank votes	0	0.00						
Total votes	1,937,018	100.00						
Registered voters/turnout	3,471,492	55.80		3,471,492	–			

== Gandaki Province ==
Party	Party list			Constituency			Total seats	+/–
Party	Votes	%	Seats	Votes	%	Seats	Total seats	+/–
Communist Party of Nepal (Unified Marxist–Leninist)	367,989	37.33	10			12	22	▼4
Nepali Congress	349,628	35.47	9			18	27	▲12
Communist Party of Nepal (Maoist Centre)―Nepal Socialist Party	116,945	11.86	3			5	8	▼4
Rastriya Prajatantra Party	59,483	6.03	2			0	2	▲2
Hamro Nepali Party	18,737	1.90	0			0	0	New
Communist Party of Nepal (Unified Socialist)	15,076	1.53	0			0	0	–
Rastriya Janamorcha	14,940	1.52	0			0	0	▼2
Mongol National Organisation	11,636	1.18	0			0	0	–
People's Socialist Party, Nepal	5,757	0.58	0			0	0	▼2
Rastriya Janamukti Party	4,056	0.41	0			0	0	New
Nepal Aama Party―Nepal Sushashan Party	3,959	0.40	0			0	0	New
Janamat Party	3,823	0.39	0			0	0	–
Nagrik Unmukti Party	2,358	0.24	0			0	0	New
CPN (Marxist–Leninist)	1,968	0.20	0			0	0	–
Maulik Jarokilo Party	1,182	0.12	0			0	0	New
Aamul Pariwartan Masiha Party Nepal	932	0.09	0			0	0	New
Rastriya Prajatantra Party Nepal	912	0.09	0			0	0	New
Communist Party of Nepal (Socialist)―Nepal Dalit Party―Samajik Ekata Party	863	0.09	0			0	0	New
Nepalka Lagi Nepali Party	817	0.08	0			0	0	New
Nepali Congress (B.P.)	791	0.08	0			0	0	–
Nepali Janata Dal	741	0.08	0			0	0	–
Janasamajbadi Party	627	0.06	0			0	0	–
Nepal Workers Peasants Party	506	0.05	0			0	0	–
Sanghiya Loktantrik Rastriya Manch	493	0.05	0			0	0	–
Bibeksheel Sajha Party	481	0.05	0			0	0	New
Communist Party of Nepal Maoist Socialist	404	0.04	0			0	0	New
Nationalist People's Party	209	0.02	0			0	0	New
Loktantrik Samajwadi Party, Nepal	195	0.02	0			0	0	New
Nepal Loktantrik Party	178	0.02	0			0	0	New
Nepal Federal Socialist Party	77	0.01	0			0	0	New
Bahujan Shakti Party	39	0.00	0			0	0	New
Independents			0			1	1	Steady
Total	985,802	100.00	24			36	60	–
Valid votes	985,802	100.00						
Invalid/blank votes	0	0.00						
Total votes	985,802	100.00						
Registered voters/turnout	1,817,541	54.24		1,817,541	–			

== Lumbini Province ==
Party	Party list			Constituency			Total seats	+/–
Party	Votes	%	Seats	Votes	%	Seats	Total seats	+/–
Communist Party of Nepal (Unified Marxist–Leninist)	570,921	30.25	11			18	29	▼8
Nepali Congress	499,986	26.50	10			17	27	▲8
Communist Party of Nepal (Maoist Centre)―Nepal Socialist Party	198,450	10.52	4			5	9	▼8
Rastriya Prajatantra Party	127,452	6.75	2			2	4	▲4
Nagrik Unmukti Party	125,521	6.65	2			2	4	New
Janamat Party	81,605	4.32	2			1	3	New
People's Socialist Party, Nepal	60,886	3.23	1			2	3	▼1
Communist Party of Nepal (Unified Socialist)	42,621	2.26	1			0	1	▼1
Loktantrik Samajwadi Party, Nepal	37,631	1.99	1			2	3	▲1
Rastriya Janamorcha	32,647	1.73	1			0	1	Steady
Hamro Nepali Party	27,704	1.47	0			0	0	New
Rastriya Janamukti Party	17,867	0.95	0			0	0	–
People's Progressive Party	15,109	0.80	0			0	0	New
Mongol National Organisation	11,867	0.63	0			0	0	–
CPN (Marxist–Leninist)	6,445	0.34	0			0	0	–
Nepal Janata Party	5,222	0.28	0			0	0	–
Bahujan Shakti Party	4,046	0.21	0			0	0	–
Rastriya Prajatantra Party Nepal	3,349	0.18	0			0	0	New
Nepal Aama Party	2,791	0.15	0			0	0	New
Nepal Federal Socialist Party	1,912	0.10	0			0	0	New
Nepal Workers Peasants Party	1,659	0.09	0			0	0	New
Nepalka Lagi Nepali Party	1,607	0.09	0			0	0	–
Nepali Janata Dal	1,419	0.08	0			0	0	–
Nepali Congress (B.P.)	1,288	0.07	0			0	0	–
Janasamajbadi Party	1,214	0.06	0			0	0	New
Nepal Loktantrik Party	1,207	0.06	0			0	0	New
Nepal Dalit Party―Samajik Ekata Party	1,014	0.05	0			0	0	New
Sanghiya Loktantrik Rastriya Manch (Tharuhat)	973	0.05	0			0	0	–
Maulik Jarokilo Party	928	0.05	0			0	0	New
Bibeksheel Sajha Party	791	0.04	0			0	0	New
Communist Party of Nepal Maoist Socialist	489	0.03	0			0	0	New
Nationalist People's Party	457	0.02	0			0	0	New
Independents			–			3	3	▲2
Total	1,887,078	100.00	35			52	87	–
Valid votes	1,887,078	100.00						
Invalid/blank votes	0	0.00						
Total votes	1,887,078	100.00						
Registered voters/turnout	3,249,637	58.07		3,249,637	–			

== Karnali Province ==
Party	Party list			Constituency			Total seats	+/–
Party	Votes	%	Seats	Votes	%	Seats	Total seats	+/–
Communist Party of Nepal (Unified Marxist–Leninist)	183,950	31.83	5			5	10	▼3
Nepali Congress	170,756	29.55	5			9	14	▲8
Communist Party of Nepal (Maoist Centre)―Nepal Socialist Party	137,629	23.82	4			9	13	▲2
Communist Party of Nepal (Unified Socialist)	35,826	6.20	1			0	1	▼2
Rastriya Prajatantra Party	25,186	4.36	1			0	1	Steady
Nepal Workers Peasants Party	8,993	1.56	0			0	0	–
CPN (Marxist–Leninist)	3,099	0.54	0			0	0	–
Communist Party of Nepal Maoist Socialist	1,871	0.32	0			0	0	New
Rastriya Janamorcha	1,836	0.32	0			0	0	–
Hamro Nepali Party	1,662	0.29	0			0	0	New
People's Socialist Party, Nepal	1,124	0.19	0			0	0	–
Rastriya Prajatantra Party Nepal	606	0.10	0			0	0	New
Mongol National Organisation	574	0.10	0			0	0	New
Nepali Congress (B.P.)	538	0.09	0			0	0	–
Bibeksheel Sajha Party	489	0.08	0			0	0	–
Janasamajbadi Party	445	0.08	0			0	0	New
Nepali Janata Dal	423	0.07	0			0	0	–
Nationalist People's Party	411	0.07	0			0	0	New
Nagrik Unmukti Party	386	0.07	0			0	0	New
Nepalka Lagi Nepali Party	360	0.06	0			0	0	New
Nepal Aama Party―Nepal Naulo Janbadi Party	326	0.06	0			0	0	New
Communist Party of Nepal (Socialist)	320	0.06	0			0	0	New
Sanghiya Loktantrik Rastriya Manch	312	0.05	0			0	0	New
Loktantrik Samajwadi Party, Nepal	254	0.04	0			0	0	New
Rastriya Janamukti Party	204	0.04	0			0	0	–
Nepal Loktantrik Party	146	0.03	0			0	0	New
Bahujan Shakti Party	63	0.01	0			0	0	–
Nepal Federal Socialist Party	40	0.01	0			0	0	New
Communist Party of Nepal Marxist (Pushpalal)			0			0	0	New
Nepal Janata Party			0			0	0	New
Independents			0			1	1	▲1
Total	577,829	100.00	16			24	40	–
Valid votes	577,829	100.00						
Invalid/blank votes	0	0.00						
Total votes	577,829	100.00						
Registered voters/turnout	1,008,403	57.30		1,008,043	–			

== Sudurpashchim Province ==
Party	Party list			Constituency			Total seats	+/–
Party	Votes	%	Seats	Votes	%	Seats	Total seats	+/–
Communist Party of Nepal (Unified Marxist–Leninist)	274,675	30.64	7			3	10	▼1
Nepali Congress	269,564	30.07	7			12	19	▲8
Communist Party of Nepal (Maoist Centre)―Nepal Socialist Party	121,431	13.55	3			8	11	▼2
Nagrik Unmukti Party	98,559	11.00	2			5	7	New
Rastriya Prajatantra Party	44,233	4.93	1			0	1	▲1
Communist Party of Nepal (Unified Socialist)	43,819	4.89	1			3	4	▼10
Nepali Congress (B.P.)	6,969	0.78	0			0	0	–
Rastriya Janamorcha	4,491	0.50	0			0	0	–
CPN (Marxist–Leninist)	4,422	0.49	0			0	0	–
People's Socialist Party, Nepal	3,622	0.40	0			0	0	▼1
Hamro Nepali Party	2,966	0.33	0			0	0	New
Loktantrik Samajwadi Party, Nepal	2,926	0.33	0			0	0	▼1
Janamat Party	1,995	0.22	0			0	0	New
Nepal Loktantrik Party	1,629	0.18	0			0	0	New
Maulik Jarokilo Party	1,540	0.17	0			0	0	New
Rastriya Nagarik Party	1,422	0.16	0			0	0	New
Sanghiya Loktantrik Rastriya Manch	1,370	0.15	0			0	0	–
Rastriya Prajatantra Party Nepal	1,246	0.14	0			0	0	New
Nepal Workers Peasants Party	1,233	0.14	0			0	0	New
Nepali Janata Dal	1,026	0.11	0			0	0	–
Nepal Aama Party―Nepal Sushashan Party	988	0.11	0			0	0	New
Communist Party of Nepal Maoist Socialist	729	0.08	0			0	0	New
Mongol National Organisation	670	0.07	0			0	0	New
Janasamajbadi Party, Nepal	637	0.07	0			0	0	New
Nepalka Lagi Nepali Party	628	0.07	0			0	0	New
Janajagaran Party Nepal	571	0.06	0			0	0	New
Bahujan Shakti Party	518	0.06	0			0	0	New
Nepal Dalit Party	481	0.05	0			0	0	New
Nationalist People's Party	466	0.05	0			0	0	New
Bibeksheel Sajha Party	432	0.05	0			0	0	New
People's Progressive Party	430	0.05	0			0	0	New
Sanghiya Loktantrik Rastriya Manch (Tharuhat)	332	0.04	0			0	0	–
Rastriya Janamukti Party	216	0.02	0			0	0	–
Nepal Federal Socialist Party	150	0.02	0			0	0	New
Independents			0			1	1	▲1
Total	896,386	100.00	21			32	53	–
Valid votes	896,386	100.00						
Invalid/blank votes	0	0.00						
Total votes	896,386	100.00						
Registered voters/turnout	1,658,004	54.06		1,658,004	–			

== See also ==
- 2022 Nepalese local elections
- 2022 Nepalese general elections
