= Rupa Kumari Yadav =

Nepalese politician

Honourable Rupa Kumari Yadav
- रुपा कुमारी यादव

Member of Madhesh Provincial Assembly
- Incumbent
- Assumed office 2022
- Constituency: Party list

Personal details
- Party: Loktantrik Samajwadi Party, Nepal

Rupa Kumari Yadav (Nepali: रुपा कुमारी यादव) is a Nepalese politician belonging to the Loktantrik Samajwadi Party, Nepal. He is also a party-list member of the Lumbini Provincial Assembly.

Yadav was sworn as MLA under Madheshi category.
