= Dipak Kumar Sah =

Nepalese politician, former minister

- दिपककुमार साह

Minister of Labour, Employment and Social Security
- In office 27 March 2026 – 9 April 2026
- President: Ram Chandra Poudel
- Prime Minister: Balendra Shah
- Preceded by: Sushila Karki
- Succeeded by: Ramjee Yadav

Member of the Parliament, Pratinidhi Sabha
- Incumbent
- Assumed office 26 March 2026
- Preceded by: Sharat Singh Bhandari
- Constituency: Mahottari 2

Personal details
- Born: 24 March 1991 (age 35) Mahottari, Mahottari District, Madhesh Province
- Party: Rastriya Swatantra Party
- Spouse: Junu Shrestha
- Parent: Ram Gopal Sah (father)
- Education: PG in public health
- Alma mater: London School of Hygiene and Tropical Medicine
- Occupation: Politician, Medical professional

Dipak Kumar Sah (Nepali: दिपककुमार साह) is a Nepalese politician, medical professional and currently a member of Pratinidhi Sabha from Rastriya Swatantra Party. He served as the Minister for Labour, Employment and Social Security under Prime Minister Balendra Shah's cabinet from 27 March 2026 to 9 April 2026. He resigned from Ministry due to some media trail. He joined the Rastriya Swatantra Party in 2026 and secured a party ticket to contest 2026 general election from Mahottari 2.

In the 2026 general election, he won from Mahottari 2 with 32,722 votes, defeating Sharat Singh Bhandari seating MP and former minister of the People's Socialist Party, Nepal.

== Early life and education ==
Sah was born in Mahottari, Mahottari District on 24 June 1990. Sah completed his Postgraduate degree in public health. He has received education from the London School of Hygiene and Tropical Medicine in the United Kingdom and the Institute of Medical Sciences under Tribhuvan University.

== Electoral performance ==
Election	Year	Constituency	Contested for	Political party	Result	Votes	% of votes
Nepal general election	2026	Mahottari 2	Pratinidhi Sabha member	Rastriya Swatantra Party	Won	32,722	55.27%
