= Dipendra Kumar Thakur =

Nepalese politician

Honourable Dipendra Kumar Thakur
- दिपेन्द्र कुमार ठाकुर

Province Assembly Member of Madhesh Province
- Incumbent
- Assumed office 2023
- Preceded by: N/A
- Constituency: Dhanusha 3 (B)

Personal details
- Party: CPN (UML)
- Occupation: Politician

Dipendra Kumar Thakur (Nepali: दिपेन्द्र कुमार ठाकुर) is a Nepalese politician. He is serving as an elected member of Provincial Assembly of Madhesh Province belonging to the Communist Party of Nepal (Unified Marxist–Leninist). He is a resident of Dhanusha-3 was elected to the 2022 Madhesh Provincial Assembly election from Dhanusha 3 (B).
