= Bijay Kumar Singh (Nepali politician) =

Nepali politician

Honourable Bijay Kumar Singh
- विजय कुमार सिंह

Member of Constituent Assembly
- In office 2013–2017
- President: Ram Baran Yadav
- Prime Minister: Sushil Koirala
- Constituency: Proportional list

Personal details
- Party: Terai Madhesh Loktantrik Party
- Other political affiliations: Nepali Congress (until 2007)
- Parent: Bhola Singh (father)

Bijay Kumar Singh (Nepali: विजय कुमार सिंह) is a Nepali politician belonging to Terai Madhesh Loktantrik Party. He is also a former member of Constituent Assembly and was elected under proportional list.

He is the founding leader of Terai Madhesh Loktantrik Party.

== See also ==
- Brikhesh Chandra Lal
