= Democratic Student Union =

Political organization in Nepal

Democratic Student Union लोकतान्त्रिक विद्यार्थी संघ
- Abbreviation: DSU
- Established: 2021
- Type: Student wing
- Headquarters: Kathmandu, Nepal
- Region served: Nepal
- Members: 25,000
- President: Roshan Kumar Mishra
- Parent organisation: Loktantrik Samajwadi Party, Nepal

The Democratic Student Union (Nepali: लोकतान्त्रिक विद्यार्थी संघ, abbreviated as लो. वि. संघ) is a political student organization in Nepal. The DSU was founded in 2021. The DSU is politically tied to the Loktantrik Samajwadi Party, Nepal.

The DSU has a 132 membered central committee led by Roshan Kumar Mishra. It declares itself a legitimate and independent students' organization of all democratic students of Nepal.

== Leadership ==
=== President ===
- Roshan Kumar Mishra (2023-present)
