= Rabindra Patel =

Nepalese politician

The Honourable Rabindra Patel
- रविन्द्र पटेल

Member of Parliament, Pratinidhi Sabha
- Incumbent
- Assumed office 26 March 2026
- Preceded by: Prabhu Sah
- Constituency: Rautahat 3

Personal details
- Citizenship: Nepalese
- Party: Rastriya Swatantra Party
- Education: Tribhuvan University (BEd)
- Profession: Politician

Rabindra Patel (Nepali: रविन्द्र पटेल) is a Nepalese politician serving as a member of parliament from the Rastriya Swatantra Party. He is the member of the 7th Pratinidhi Sabha elected from Rautahat 3 constituency in 2026 Nepalese General Election securing 27,318 votes and defeating his closest contender Govinda Chaudhary of the Janta Samajbadi Party. He holds BEd from Tribhuvan University.

== Electoral performance ==
Election	Year	Constituency	Contested for	Political party	Result	Votes	% of votes	Ref.
Nepal general election	2026	Rautahat 3	Pratinidhi Sabha member	Rastriya Swatantra Party	Won	27,318	40.88%	
