= Nagendra Rae Yadav =

Nepalese politician

Honourable Nagendra Rae Yadav
- नागेन्द्र राय यादव

Minister of State for Industry, Tourism and Forests and Environment of Madhesh Province
- Incumbent
- Assumed office 6 February 2021
- Minister: Satrudhan Mahato
- Governor: Hari Shankar Mishra
- Chief minister: Lalbabu Raut
- Preceded by: Suresh Kumar Mandal

Member of Provincial Assembly of Madhesh Province
- Incumbent
- Assumed office 2017
- President: Bidya Devi Bhandari
- Prime Minister: Sher Bahadur Deuba
- Constituency: Rautahat 3(A)

Personal details
- Born: Rautahat, Nepal
- Party: CPN (Unified Socialist)

Nagendra Rae Yadav or Nagendra Raya Yadav (Nepali: नागेन्द्र राय यादव) is a Nepalese politician belonging to CPN (Unified Socialist). He is also serving as member of Provincial Assembly of Madhesh Province.

He is currently serving as Minister of state for Industry, Tourism and Forest of Madhesh Province under minister Satrudhan Mahato.

== Electoral history ==
=== 2017 Nepalese provincial elections ===
Rautahat 3(A)
Party	Candidate	Votes
CPN (Unified Marxist–Leninist)	Nagendra Raya Yadav	11,182
Rastriya Janata Party Nepal	Govinda Chaudhary	10,834
Nepali Congress	Mohammad Seraj	7,441
Others		439
Invalid votes		1,545
Result	CPN (UML) gain	
Source: Election Commission

== See also ==
- CPN (Unified Socialist)
- Ram Chandra Jha
- Bansidhar Mishra
- Satrudhan Mahato
