= Jainab Khatun =

Nepalese politician

Honourable Jainab Khatun
- जैनव खातुन

Province Assembly Member of Madhesh Province
- Incumbent
- Assumed office 2023
- Constituency: Party list

Personal details
- Party: CPN (UML)
- Occupation: Politician

Jainab Khatun (Nepali: जैनव खातुन) is a Nepalese politician. She is serving as an elected member of Provincial Assembly of Madhesh Province belonging to the Communist Party of Nepal (Unified Marxist–Leninist).

Khatun is sworn as an assembly member under Muslim category.
