= Rani Kumari Tiwari =

Nepalese politician

Honourable Rani Kumari Tiwari
- रानी कुमारी तिवारी

Province Assembly Member of Madhesh Province
- Incumbent
- Assumed office 2017
- Preceded by: N/A
- Constituency: Mahottari 3 (constituency)

Personal details
- Born: October 26, 1979 (age 46)
- Party: Loktantrik Samajwadi Party, Nepal
- Occupation: Politician

Rani Kumari Tiwari (Nepali: रानी कुमारी तिवारी) is a Nepalese politician. She is a member of Provincial Assembly of Madhesh Province from Loktantrik Samajwadi Party, Nepal. Tiwari, a resident of Manara, was elected via 2017 Nepalese provincial elections from Mahottari 3(B).

== Electoral history ==
=== 2017 Nepalese provincial elections ===
Party	Candidate	Votes
Rastriya Janata Party Nepal	Rani Kumari Tiwari	7,430
Independent	Suresh Sah Sonar	5,598
Nepali Congress	Pawan Sah	1,921
Bahujan Shakti Party	Sakhi Chandra Yadav	1,610
Independent	Tej Narayan Ray	1,216
CPN (Unified Marxist-Leninist)	Bijay Kumar Karna	1,123
Others		3,652
Invalid votes		2,085
Result	RJPN gain	
Source: Election Commission
