= Prabhu Sah =

Nepali politician

Honourable Prabhu Sah
- प्रभु साह
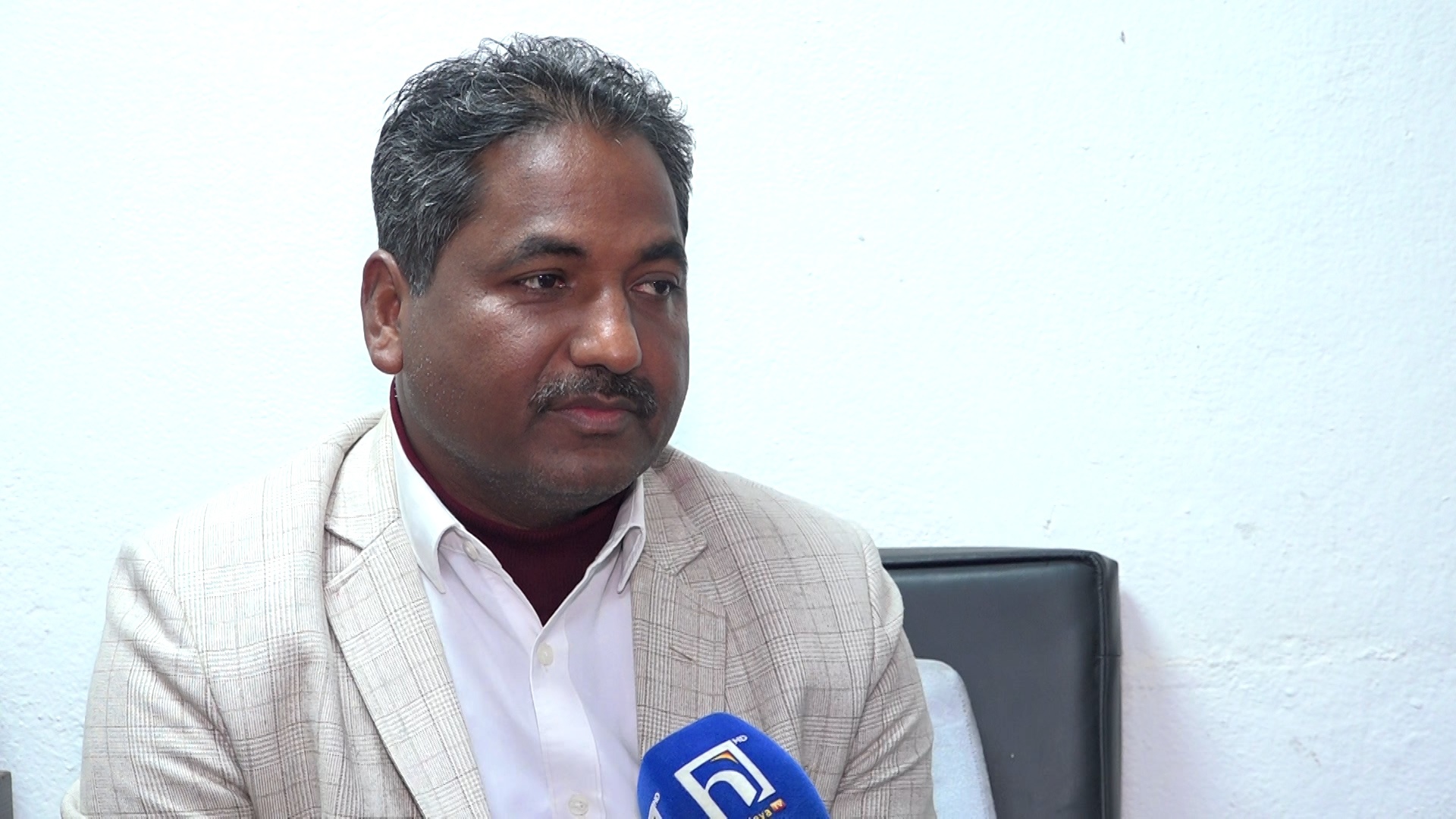
- Sah in 2024

Minister of Urban Development
- In office 25 December 2020 – 20 May 2021
- President: Bidhya Devi Bhandari
- Prime Minister: KP Sharma Oli
- Preceded by: Krishna Gopal Shrestha
- Succeeded by: Ram Kumari Jhakri
- In office 7 June 2017 – 17 October 2017
- President: Bidya Devi Bhandari
- Prime Minister: Sher Bahadur Deuba
- Preceded by: Arjun Narasingha K.C.
- Succeeded by: Dil Nath Giri

Minister for Law and Constitutional Affairs
- In office 4 May 2011 – 29 August 2011
- President: Ram Baran Yadav
- Prime Minister: Jhala Nath Khanal

Minister of Land Management, Cooperatives and Poverty Alleviation
- In office 29 August 2011 – 16 October 2011
- President: Ram Baran Yadav
- Prime Minister: Baburam Bhattarai

Member of Parliament, Pratinidhi Sabha
- In office 2023 – 12 September 2025
- Succeeded by: Rabindra Patel
- In office 4 March 2018 – 2021
- Constituency: Rautahat 3

Member of 1st and 2nd Nepalese Constituent Assembly
- In office 28 May 2008 – 14 October 2017
- Preceded by: Bansidhar Mishra
- Constituency: Rautahat 3

Personal details
- Born: 10 October 1974 (age 51) Rautahat District
- Party: Aam Janata Party
- Spouse: Reena Kumari Sah
- Children: 2
- Parent(s): Babu Lal Sah (father); Laxminiya Devi Sah (mother)
- Website: prabhusah.com

Prabhu Sah (Nepali: प्रभु साह) is a Nepalese politician and a former Minister of Urban Development of Government of Nepal. He has served as chairman of Aam Janata Party since the faction's split from the CPN (UML).

== Political life ==
In the 2008 Nepalese Constituent Assembly election he was elected from the Rautahat 3 (constituency), winning 11,625 votes. In the 2013 Nepalese Constituent Assembly election he was elected from the Rautahat 3 (constituency), winning 13,009 votes. He was elected, in the elections held in 2017, as a member of the House of Representatives from his home district. Sah also served as Minister for Law and Constitutional Affairs under Jhalanath Khanal cabinet in 2011, also Minister of Urban Development under Sher Bahadur Deuba cabinet and Minister of Land Management, Cooperatives and Poverty Alleviation.

== Literature ==
He wrote many books inspired by his life. Some of them are Madheshi Mukti ka Aadharharu, Mera Yatana Ka 270 Deen haru, Janayudha ra Madhesi Mukti ko Karyadisa, etc.

== Electoral history ==
He was elected to the Member of House of Representatives in 2017, Member of 2013 Constituent Assembly and Member of 2008 Constituent Assembly.

2017 legislative elections

Rautahat 3 (constituency)

| Party | Candidate | Votes |
|---|---|---|
| CPN (Maoist Centre) | Prabhu Sah Teli | 27,799 |
| Nepali Congress | Sunil Kumar Yadav | 18,206 |
| Rastriya Janata Party Nepal | Om Prakash | 14,658 |
| Others | | 1,295 |
| Invalid votes | | 3,558 |
| Result | Maoist Centre hold | |
Source: Election Commission

2013 Constituent Assembly election

Rautahat 3 (constituency)

| Party | Candidate | Votes |
|---|---|---|
| UCPN (Maoist) | Prabhu Sah Teli | 13,009 |
| Madhesi Jana Adhikar Forum, Nepal | Ram Kishor Prasad Yadav | 10,210 |
| CPN (Unified Marxist–Leninist) | Hridaya Narayan Prasad Sah | 5,333 |
| Nepali Congress | Hridaya Narayan Ray Yadav | 4,092 |
| Dalit Janajati Party | Sanjay Mahato | 1,184 |
| Others | | 3,750 |
| Result | Maoist hold | |
Source: NepalNews

2008 Constituent Assembly election

Rautahat 3 (constituency)

| Party | Candidate | Votes |
|---|---|---|
| CPN (Maoist) | Prabhu Sah Teli | 11,625 |
| Madhesi Jana Adhikar Forum, Nepal | Ram Kishor Prasad Yadav | 10,903 |
| Nepali Congress | Sheikh Rashid Ali | 4,255 |
| CPN (Unified Marxist–Leninist) | Kamal Raya Yadav | 3,571 |
| Terai Madhesh Loktantrik Party | Rajdev Prasad Chaudhary | 2,847 |
| Sadbhavana Party | Shambhu Prasad Jaiswal | 1,362 |
| CPN (United) | Ram Bishwas Raya Yadav | 1,212 |
| Others | Nawal Kishor Prasad Yadav | 2,854 |
| Invalid votes | | 2,793 |
| Result | Maoist gain | |
Source: Election Commission

== See also ==
- Aam Janata Party
