= Sharat Singh Bhandari =

Nepalese politician

- शरतसिंह भण्डारी
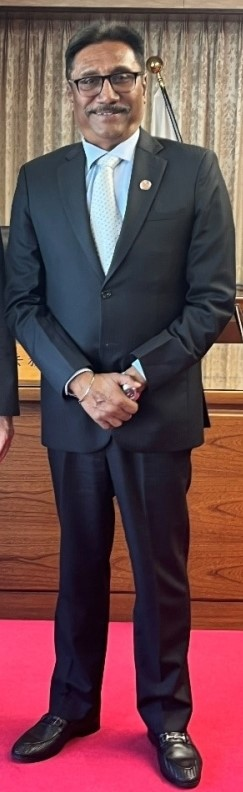
- Sharat Singh Bhandari in 2025

Minister of Labour, Employment and Social Security of Nepal
- In office 15 July 2024 – 9 September 2025
- President: Ram Chandra Paudel
- Prime Minister: KP Sharma Oli
- Preceded by: Dol Prasad Aryal
- Succeeded by: Sushila Karki
- In office 31 March 2023 – 4 March 2024
- President: Ram Chandra Paudel
- Prime Minister: Pushpa Kamal Dahal
- Preceded by: Dol Prasad Aryal
- Succeeded by: Dol Prasad Aryal

Minister of Energy, Water Resources and Irrigation of Nepal
- In office 4 June 2021 – 22 June 2021
- President: Bidya Devi Bhandari
- Prime Minister: KP Sharma Oli
- Preceded by: Top Bahadur Rayamajhi
- Succeeded by: Pampha Bhusal

Minister of Defence of Nepal
- In office 4 September 2011 – 14 March 2013
- President: Ram Baran Yadav
- Prime Minister: Baburam Bhattarai
- Succeeded by: Khil Raj Regmi
Parliamentary offices
Member of Parliament, Pratinidhi Sabha
In office 4 March 2018 – 12 September 2025
Preceded by	Kiran Yadav
Succeeded by	Dipak Kumar Sah
Constituency	Mahottari 2
In office May 1999 – May 2002
Preceded by	Ram Vilas Yadav
Succeeded by	Ganesh Tiwari Nepali
Constituency	Mahottari 3
In office October 1994 – May 1999
Preceded by	Beni Madhav Singh
Succeeded by	Mahendra Kumar Ray
Constituency	Mahottari 4
Member of Constituent Assembly
In office 28 May 2008 – 28 May 2012
Preceded by	Constituency established
Succeeded by	Sitaram Bhandari
Constituency	Mahottari 6

Personal details
- Born: 8 October 1954 (age 71)
- Party: Janata Samajwadi Party Nepal
- Other political affiliations: People's Socialist Party (2020–2021); Rastriya Janata Party (2017–2020); Rastriya Madhesh Samajbadi (2013–2020); Madheshi Janaadhikar Forum, Nepal (Democratic) (2009–2013); Madhesi Jana Adhikar Forum, Nepal (2008–2009); Nepali Congress (Democratic) (2002–2007); Nepali Congress (1992–2002, 2007-2008); Rastriya Prajatantra Party (? –1991)
- Relatives: Biraj Bhakta Shrestha (son-in-law)

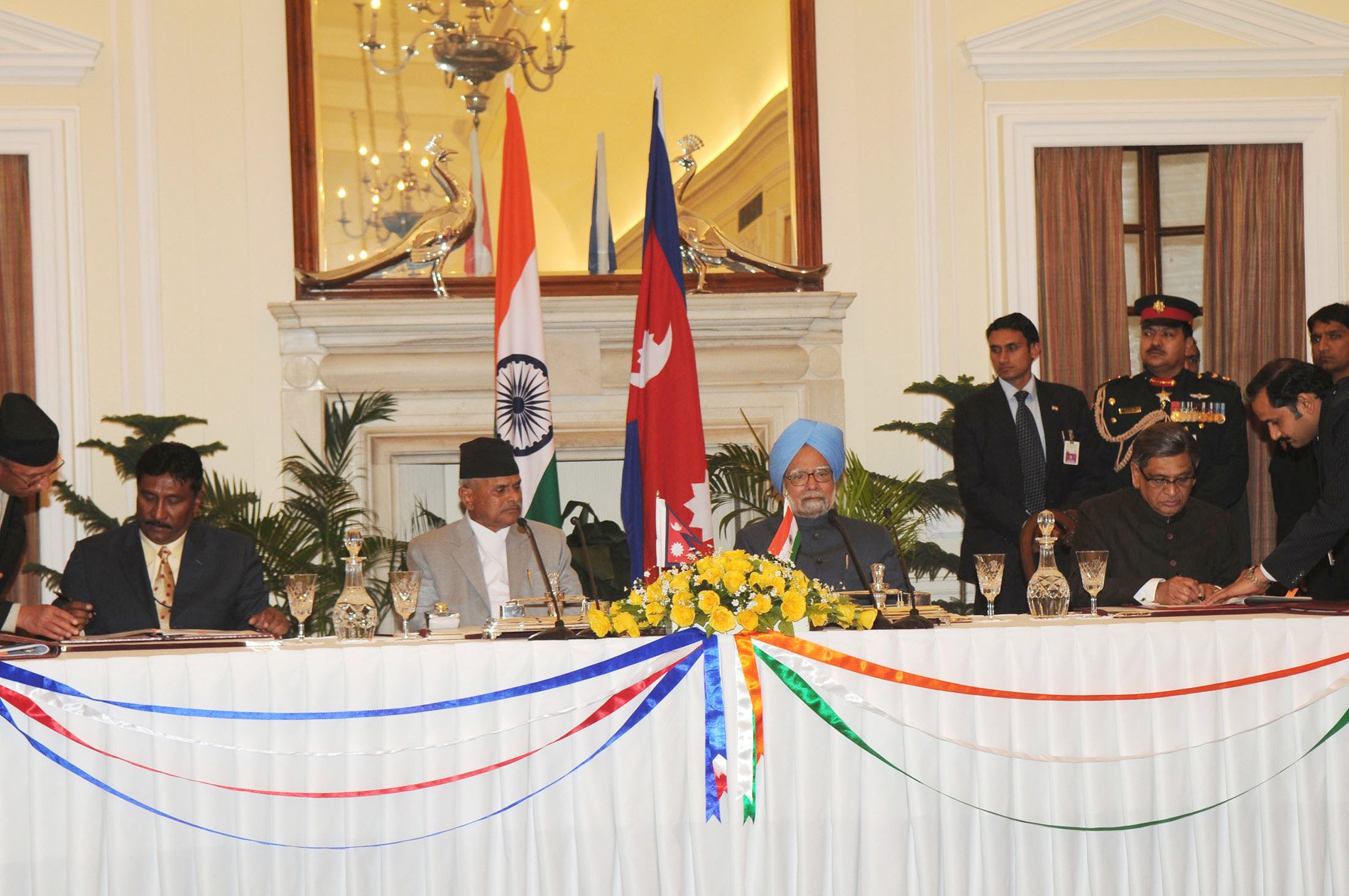
Mr. Sharat Singh Bhandari in his capacity as Minister of Tourism and Civil Aviation signing an air and railway infrastructure agreement with the Union Minister For External Affairs, Shri S.M. Krishna. February 16, 2010.

Sharat Singh Bhandari (Nepali: शरतसिंह भण्डारी) is a Nepalese politician and a former Minister of Energy, Water Resources and Irrigation of Government of Nepal. His ministerial tenure began on 4 June 2021 but he was removed from the post by the Supreme Court on 22 June 2021, making his tenure of just 18 days one of the shortest for ministers in Nepal till date (the shortest being that of Raj Kishor Yadav). He also assumed the post of Ministry of Defence in the Baburam Bhattarai cabinet. He was elected to the Pratinidhi Sabha in the 1999 election on behalf of the Nepali Congress. He is one of the most time entries as a minister in cabinet of Nepal.
