= Rautahat 3 =

Parliamentary constituency in Nepal

- Parliamentary constituency
- Rautahat 3 in Province No. 2
- Province: Province No. 2
- District: Rautahat District

Current constituency
- Created: 1991
- Party: Rastriya Swatantra Party
- Member of Parliament: Rabindra Patel

Rautahat 3 is one of four parliamentary constituencies of Rautahat District in Nepal. This constituency came into existence on the Constituency Delimitation Commission (CDC) report submitted on 31 August 2017.

== Incorporated areas ==
Rautahat 3 incorporates Gujara Municipality, Phatuwa Bijaypur Municipality, Katahariya Municipality, wards 5–7 of Garuda Municipality, wards 1–5, 8 and 9 of Maulapur Municipality and wards 5–9 of Dewahi Gonahi Municipality.

== Assembly segments ==
It encompasses the following Province No. 2 Provincial Assembly segment

- Rautahat 3(A)
- Rautahat 3(B)

== Members of Parliament ==
=== Parliament/Constituent Assembly ===
Election	Member	Party
1991	Govinda Chaudhary	Independent
1994	Harihar Prasad Yadav	Nepali Congress
1999	Bansidhar Mishra	CPN (Unified Marxist–Leninist)
2008	Prabhu Sah	CPN (Maoist)
January 2009	Prabhu Sah	UCPN (Maoist)
May 2016	Prabhu Sah	CPN (Maoist Centre)
May 2018	Prabhu Sah	Nepal Communist Party
2022	Prabhu Sah	Independent
2026	Rabindra Patel	Rastriya Swatantra Party

=== Provincial Assembly ===
==== 3(A) ====
Election	Member	Party
2017	Nagendra Raya Yadav	CPN (Unified Marxist–Leninist)
May 2018	Nagendra Raya Yadav	Nepal Communist Party
March 2021	Nagendra Raya Yadav	CPN (Unified Marxist–Leninist)
August 2021	Nagendra Raya Yadav	CPN (Unified Socialist)

==== 3(B) ====
Election	Member	Party
2017	Kundan Prasad Kushwaha	CPN (Maoist Centre)
May 2018	Kundan Prasad Kushwaha	Nepal Communist Party

== Election results ==
=== Election in the 2020s ===
==== 2022 general election ====
Candidate	Party	Votes	%
Prabhu Sah	Independent	32,437	45.73
Om Prakash	Independent	25,200	35.53
Rabindra Patel	CPN (Maoist Centre)	8,558	12.06
Nagendra Chaudhary	Nagrik Unmukti Party	1,723	2.43
Nabin Prasad Chaurasiya	Rastriya Swatantra Party	1,006	1.42
Others		2,011	2.83
Total		70,935	100.00
Majority		7,237	
Independent gain			

=== Election in the 2010s ===
==== 2017 legislative elections ====
Party	Candidate	Votes
CPN (Maoist Centre)	Prabhu Sah Teli	27,799
Nepali Congress	Sunil Kumar Yadav	18,206
Rastriya Janata Party Nepal	Om Prakash	14,658
Others		1,295
Invalid votes		3,558
Result	Maoist Centre hold	
Source: Election Commission

==== 2017 Nepalese provincial elections ====
===== 3(A) =====
Party	Candidate	Votes
CPN (Unified Marxist–Leninist)	Nagendra Raya Yadav	11,182
Rastriya Janata Party Nepal	Govinda Chaudhary	10,834
Nepali Congress	Mohammad Seraj	7,441
Others		439
Invalid votes		1,545
Result	CPN (UML) gain	
Source: Election Commission

===== 3(B) =====
Party	Candidate	Votes
CPN (Maoist Centre)	Kundan Prasad Kushwaha	14,302
Federal Socialist Forum, Nepal	Brija Kishor Prasad Yadav	10,334
Nepali Congress	Ram Narayan Prasad Yadav	6,692
Others		1,035
Invalid votes		1,504
Result	Maoist Centre gain	
Source: Election Commission

==== 2013 Constituent Assembly election ====
Party	Candidate	Votes
UCPN (Maoist)	Prabhu Sah Teli	13,009
Madhesi Jana Adhikar Forum, Nepal	Ram Kishor Prasad Yadav	10,210
CPN (Unified Marxist–Leninist)	Hridaya Narayan Prasad Sah	5,333
Nepali Congress	Hridaya Narayan Ray Yadav	4,092
Dalit Janajati Party	Sanjay Mahato	1,184
Others		3,750
Result	Maoist hold	
Source: NepalNews

=== Election in the 2000s ===
==== 2008 Constituent Assembly election ====
Party	Candidate	Votes
CPN (Maoist)	Prabhu Sah Teli	11,625
Madhesi Jana Adhikar Forum, Nepal	Ram Kishor Prasad Yadav	10,903
Nepali Congress	Sheikh Rashid Ali	4,255
CPN (Unified Marxist–Leninist)	Kamal Raya Yadav	3,571
Terai Madhesh Loktantrik Party	Rajdev Prasad Chaudhary	2,847
Sadbhavana Party	Shambhu Prasad Jaiswal	1,362
CPN (United)	Ram Bishwas Raya Yadav	1,212
Others	Nawal Kishor Prasad Yadav	2,854
Invalid votes		2,793
Result	Maoist gain	
Source: Election Commission

=== Election in the 1990s ===
==== 1999 legislative elections ====
Party	Candidate	Votes
CPN (Unified Marxist–Leninist)	Bansidhar Mishra	17,391
Nepali Congress	Harihar Prasad Yadav	13,899
Independent	Govinda Chaudhary	13,207
CPN (Marxist–Leninist)	Rajdev Prasad Chaudhary	3,563
Others		2,660
Invalid Votes		2,255
Result	CPN (UML) gain	
Source: Election Commission

==== 1994 legislative elections ====
Party	Candidate	Votes
Nepali Congress	Harihar Prasad Yadav	14,890
CPN (Unified Marxist–Leninist)	Tulsi Lal Amatya	12,366
Independent	Narayan Yadav	5,721
Nepal Janabadi Morcha	Raj Dev Chaudhary	3,500
Others		5,135
Result	Congress gain	
Source: Election Commission

==== 1991 legislative elections ====
Party	Candidate	Votes
Independent	Govinda Chaudhary	13,987
Nepali Congress	Harihar Prasad Yadav	11,839
CPN (Unified Marxist–Leninist)	Mahadev Sah Kalwar	9,287
Result	Independent gain	

== See also ==
- List of parliamentary constituencies of Nepal
