= Terai Madhesh Loktantrik Party (2021) =

Social democratic political party in Nepal

Terai–Madhesh Loktantrik Party तराई-मधेश लोकतान्त्रिक पार्टी
- Abbreviation: TMLP or TAMALOPA
- President: Brikhesh Chandra Lal
- Senior leader: Bijay Kumar Singh
- Founder: Brikhesh Chandra Lal; Bijay Kumar Singh
- Founded: 13 December 2021; 4 years ago
- Split from: Loktantrik Samajwadi Party, Nepal
- Preceded by: Terai Madhesh Loktantrik Party (2007)
- Merged into: Loktantrik Samajbadi Party, Nepal
- Headquarters: Janakpur, Dhanusha, Nepal
- Ideology: Social democracy Madheshi rights
- Political position: Centre-left
- Colours
- Madhesh Provincial Assembly: 0 / 107
- Local governments: 1 / 753 Mayor/Chairperson

Election symbol

Party flag
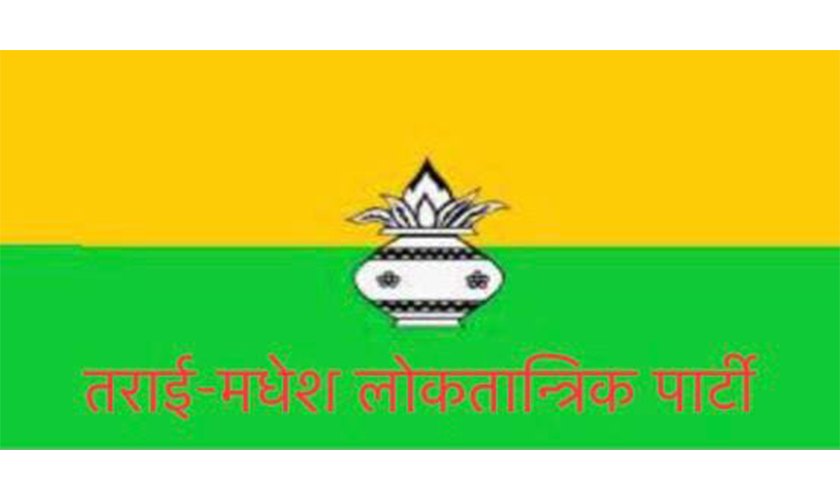

The Terai–Madhesh Loktantrik Party (Nepali: तराई-मधेस लोकतान्त्रिक पार्टी (तमलोपा)) was a political party in Nepal. Although the party's primary base remained Terai Madhesh though tried to expand its throughout Terai and Tharuhath regions of Nepal. The party later merged to Loktantrik Samajwadi Party, Nepal.

The party was officially registered at Election Commission on 13 December 2021. Brikhesh Chandra Lal is the chairman of the party and former member of constituent assembly, Bijay Kumar Singh is the senior leader of the party.

== History ==
The party was officially registered on 3 December 2021 for the second time under the name.

Later it was reported that senior leaders Brikhesh Chandra Lal and Bijay Kumar Singh had played role in registering the party under the chairmanship of Ravi Shankar Karna (Subhash). Karna who previously served as the deputy chairman of student's union of old Terai Madhesh Loktantrik Party. Similarly leader Lal and Singh were active as central committee member of Loktantrik Samajwadi Party, Nepal. They were also the founding leader of previously Mahantha Thakur led Terai Madhesh Loktantrik Party (Defunct). They had left Nepali Congress along with Thakur to form the party.

On 22 February 2021, hundreds of party caders and leaders from Loktantrik Samajwadi Party, Nepal led by Lal and Dr Singh joined the party. Among them were Ramji Ray, Dhirendra Bahadur Singh, Satis Lal Das, Yogendra Rai, Umesh Mandal and Mohammad Asgar Ali. This created a huge loss to former party organization in Dhanusha and Mahottari district.

=== Party expansion and electoral performance ===
The party won several seats in eastern terai and won several ward chairs in Janakpur, Mahottari rural municipality and other munucipalities. Similarly, the party won chairperson of Mahottari Rural Municipality which lies in Mahottari 3 which remains the election concituency of Mahantha Thakur. This was seen as a major success of the party as the party was able to divert traditional vote bank of Janata Samajwadi Party and Loktantrik Samajwadi Party ending their monopoly in the Madhesh province.

== Electoral performance ==
=== Local election ===
Election	Leader(s)	Seats		Local levels won
Election	Leader(s)	Mayor/Chairman	+/-	Local levels won
2022	Brikhesh Chandra Lal	1 / 753	▲1	Mahottari Rural Municipality

== Leadership ==
=== Chairman ===
- Brikhesh Chandra Lal (2021-present)

=== Senior leader ===
- Bijay Kumar Singh (2021-present)

== See also ==
- Loktantrik Samajwadi Party, Nepal
