= Ramita Pradhan =

Nepalese politician

Honourable Ramita Pradhan
- रमिता प्रधान

Member of Madhesh Provincial Assembly
- Incumbent
- Assumed office 2022
- Constituency: Party list

Personal details
- Party: Loktantrik Samajwadi Party, Nepal

Ramita Pradhan (Nepali: रमिता प्रधान) is a Nepalese politician belonging to the Loktantrik Samajwadi Party, Nepal. He is also a party-list member of the Lumbini Provincial Assembly .

Yadav was sworn as an MLA under Madheshi (Sudi) category.
