= Sunil Kumar Yadav =

Nepalese politician

Honourable Sunil Kumar Yadav
- सुनिल कुमार यादव

Minister for Finance of Madhesh Province
- Incumbent
- Assumed office 18 July 2024
- Chief Minister: Satish Kumar Singh
- Preceded by: Bharat Kumar Sah

Member of the Madhesh Provincial Assembly
- Incumbent
- Assumed office 2022
- Preceded by: Kundan Prasad Kushwaha
- Constituency: Rautahat 3(A)

Constituent Assembly Member
- Incumbent
- Assumed office 2013
- Constituency: Rautahat 5

Personal details
- Born: Sunil Kumar Yadav; 14 December 1981 (age 44) Phatuwa, Rautahat
- Citizenship: Nepali
- Party: Nepali Congress
- Spouse: Sangita Yadav
- Children: Abhay Kumar Yadav(SON)
- Education: Graduate in Political Science
- Alma mater: Tribhuvan University

Sunil Kumar Yadav (Jitendra) (Nepali: सुनील कुमार यादव) is a Nepali politician and current Minister of Finance for Madhesh Province. He's also serving as member of Madhesh Provincial Assembly having been elected from Rautahat 3(B).

He is former member of the 2nd Nepalese Constituent Assembly and the Legislative Parliament from Rautahat 5. A graduate in political sciences, Yadav elected started his political career from student politics.

== Electoral history ==
=== 2022 Madhesh Provincial Assembly election ===
Rautahat 3(B)
Party	Candidate	Votes
Nepali Congress	Sunil Kumar Yadav	16,877
Independent	Kundan Kumar Kushwaha	14,121
Result	Congress gain	
Source: Election Commission
