= Balawa Municipality =

Balwa बलवा
- Municipality
- Location in Nepal
- Coordinates: 26.89°N 85.67°E
- Development Region: Central
- District: Mahottari District
- Province: Province No. 2
- Established: 2016 A.D. (2073 B.S.)

Government
  - Mayor: Ram Bijay MAHATO
  - Deputy Mayor: Ram Dulari Devi

Area
  - Total: 44.07 km^{2} (17.02 sq mi)

Population (2011)
  - Total: 42,341
  - Density: 960.8/km^{2} (2,488/sq mi)
  - Religions: Hindu Muslim Christian

Languages
  - Local: Maithili, Tharu, Nepali
- Time zone: UTC+5:45 (NST)
- Postal Code: 45700
- Area code: 044
- Website: www.balwamun.gov.np

Balawa (Nepali: बलवा ) is a municipality in Mahottari District in Province No. 2 of Nepal. It was formed in 2016 occupying current 11 sections (wards) from previous 11 former VDCs. It occupies an area of 44.07 km^{2} with a total population of 42,341.
