= Mahantha Thakur =

Nepali politician

- महन्थ ठाकुर
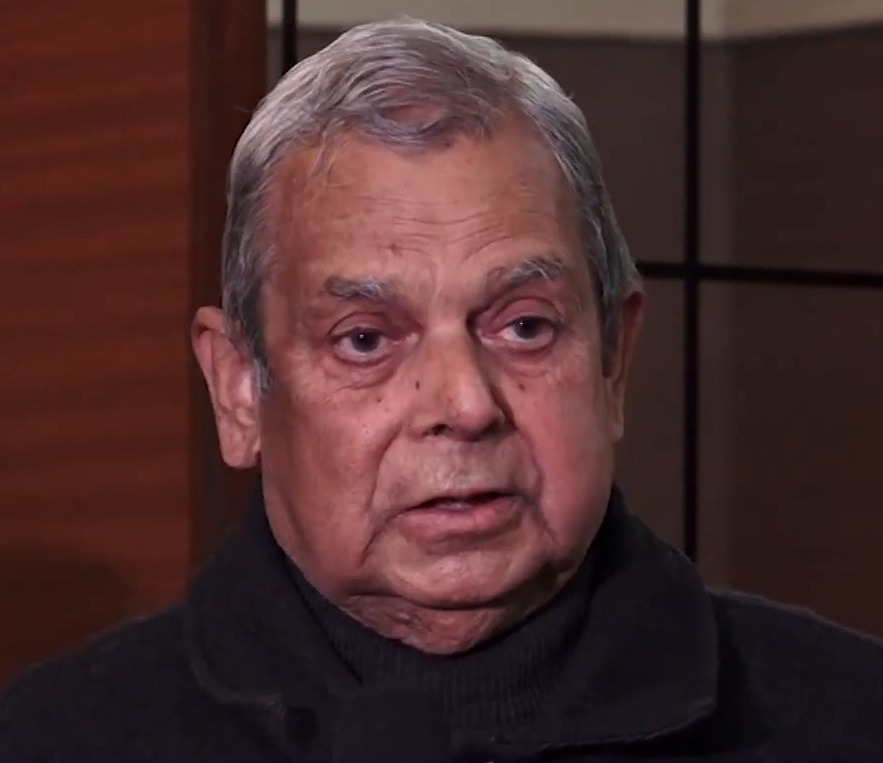
- Thakur in 2021

President of Loktantrik Samajwadi Party
- Incumbent
- Assumed office 2021
- Preceded by: position created

Deputy Speaker of House of Representatives
- In office 1991–1994
- Preceded by: Mahendra Narayan Nidhi

President of the Terai Madhesh Loktantrik Party
- In office 2006–2017
- Preceded by: position created
- Succeeded by: position abolished

Member of Parliament, Pratinidhi Sabha
- Incumbent
- Assumed office 4 March 2018
- Preceded by: Ram Dayal Mandal
- Constituency: Mahottari 3
- In office May 1991 – May 2001
- Preceded by: Constituency created
- Succeeded by: Khomari Raya
- Constituency: Sarlahi 5

Nominated Member of Constituent Assembly for Terai Madhesh Loktantrik Party
- In office 28 May 2008 – 28 May 2012

Personal details
- Born: 22 February 1941 (age 85) Godaita, Sarlahi, Nepal
- Party: Loktantrik Samajbadi Party (2021-present)
- Other political affiliations: Nepali Congress (before 2006); Terai Madhesh Loktantrik Party (2006-2017); Rastriya Janata Party (2017-2020); People's Socialist Party (2020-2021)
- Children: 1 son and daughter
- Education: Bachelor in Law
- Alma mater: Tribhuvan University

Mahantha Thakur (Nepali: महन्थ ठाकुर; born 22 February 1941) is a Nepalese politician and president of Loktantrik Samajbadi Party Nepal, as well as the former treasurer of Nepali Congress Party. He has served as minister in various ministries, including Ministry of Science and Technology while in Nepali Congress.

== Political career ==
Mahanta Thakur, who was born in Ekarahiya in Pipara village municipality of Mahottari, has left the Nepali Congress and entered the politics of Madhes as the president of TMLOP. Thakur's political background is Congress. His journey to the Congress began in 2016 BS with student politics. Leaving the Congress treasurer and science and technology minister, he entered the politics of Madhesh in 2064 BS.

In the year 2026 BS, Thakur became the president of the Students' Union affiliated to the Nepali Congress. He is also a founding central member of the Nepal Students Association. He was arrested during his student days while protesting against King Mahendra's coup d'état.

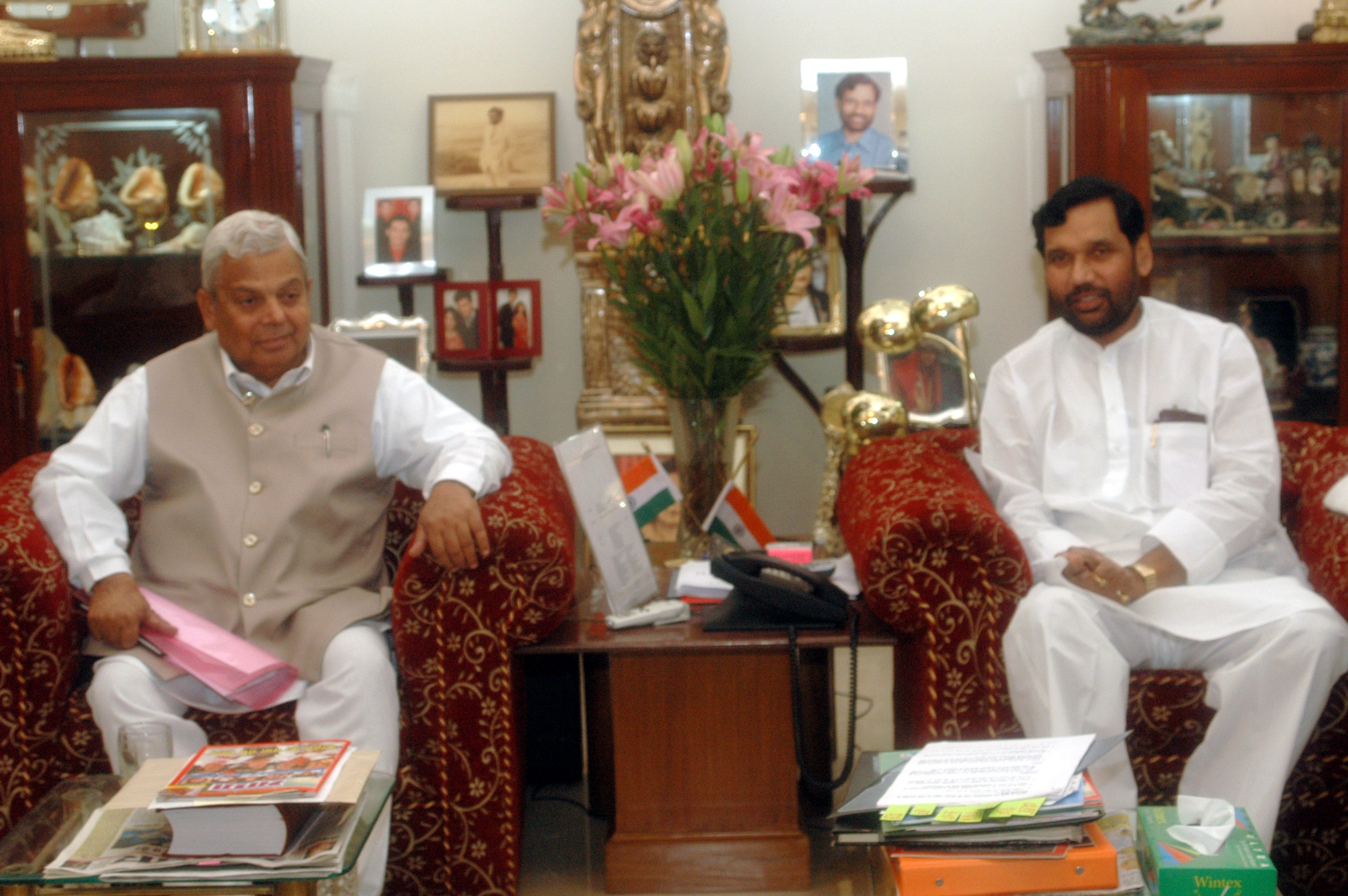
Thakur in India Visit as Agriculture Minister of Nepal

Mahanta's political journey started from Janakpur. Although his birthplace was Mahottari, his field of work was Sarlahi. He used to work as a lawyer in Sarlahi. As well as advocacy, so was political activism.

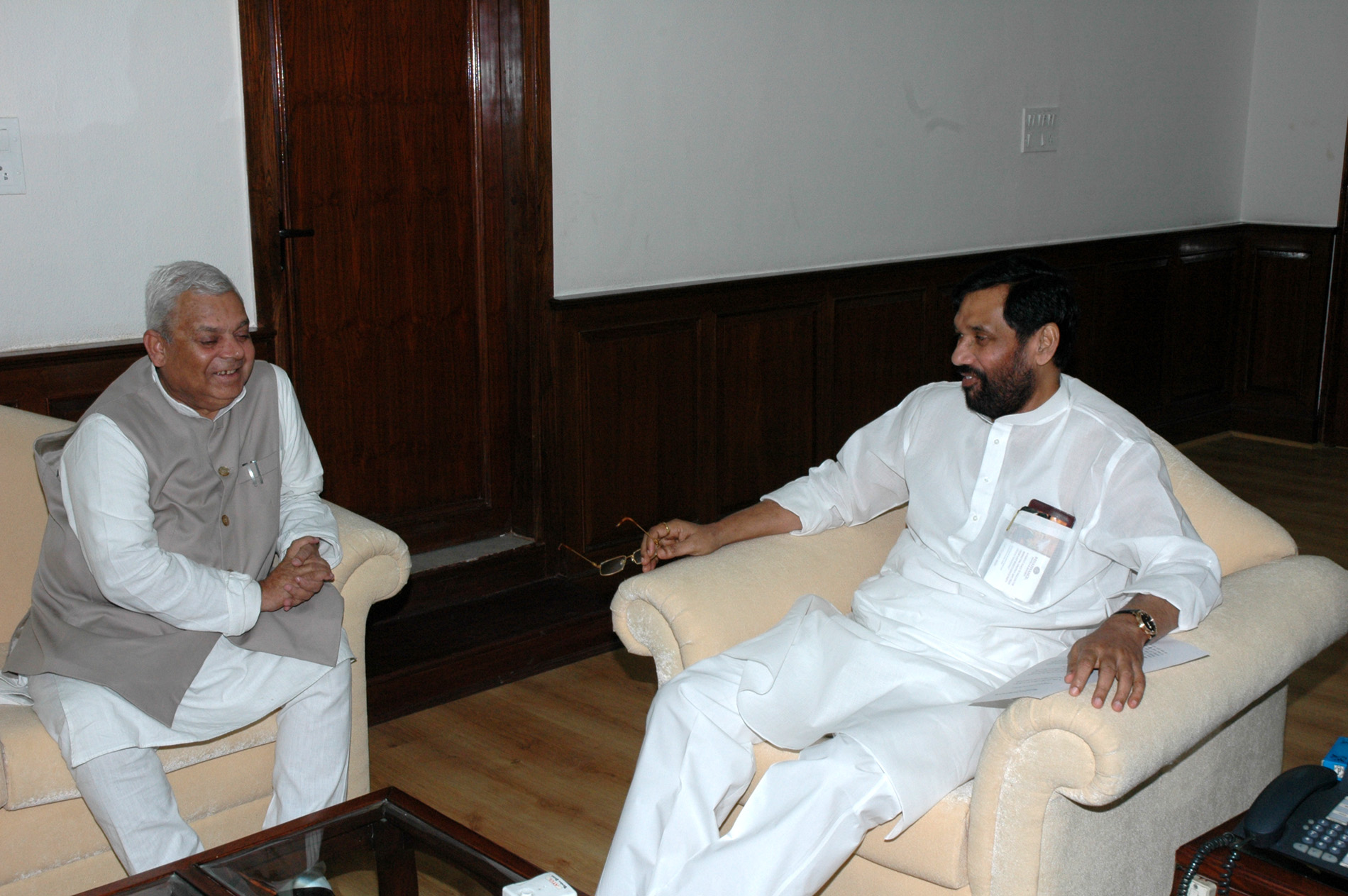
Thakur with Indian Union Minister Ram Vilas Paswan

He was elected from Sarlahi twice and was made Deputy Speaker of House of Representatives in 1991.

== Personal life ==
Thakur does not own land or a home. In Kathmandu, he lives with his daughter.

While staying in Sarlahi, Thakur's wife was injured when a stove exploded while she was cooking around 2045 BS. She died during the treatment. He was staying with his wife in a rental house in Sarlahi.

Thakur had two children and his son died in an accident. At that time, he was a medical student in BPKIHS, Dharan. His daughter is the daughter in law of former minister and governor Umakanta Jha.

== Electoral history ==
=== 2017 legislative elections ===
Mahottari-3
Party	Candidate	Votes
Rastriya Janata Party Nepal	Mahantha Thakur	26,845
CPN (Unified Marxist–Leninist)	Bijay Kumar Chaudhary	8,676
Independent	Chandeshwar Jha	4,020
Bahujan Shakti Party	Jogendra Mahato	1,884
Nepal Federal Socialist Party	Yusuf Safi	1,241
Others		2,196
Invalid votes		4,089
Result	RJPN gain	
Source: Election Commission

=== 1999 Nepalese General Election ===
Sarlahi-5
Candidate	Party	Votes	Remarks
Mahantha Thakur	Nepali Congress	11765	Elected
Ram Narayan Singh	Rashtriya Prajatantra Party	10860	

=== 1994 Nepalese General Election ===
Sarlahi-5
Candidate	Party	Votes	Remarks
Mahantha Thakur	Nepali Congress	13615	Elected
Nanda Lal Ray Yadav	Samyukta Janamorcha Nepal	9380	

=== 1991 Nepalese General Election ===
Sarlahi-5
Candidate	Party	Votes	Status
Mahantha Thakur	Nepali Congress	–	Elected

== See also ==
- Hridayesh Tripathi
- Terai Madhesh Loktantrik Party
- Nepali Congress
