= Mahottari Rural Municipality =

Mahottari महोत्तरी
- Rural Municipality
- Mahottari Rural Municipality
- Nickname: Mahottari Thareshwor Nath Mahadev
- Location in Nepal
- Coordinates: 26.69°N 85.81°E
- Country: Nepal
- Development Region: Central
- Zone: Janakpur
- District: Mahottari District
- Province: Madhesh Province
- Established: 2016 A.D. (2073 B.S.)

Government
  - Type: Local Government
  - Chairman: Dilip Kumar Panday (TMLP)
  - Deputy Chairman (JSP): Depo Devi Paswan

Area
  - Total: 28.08 km^{2} (10.84 sq mi)

Population (2011)
  - Total: 27,430
  - Density: 976.9/km^{2} (2,530/sq mi)
  - Religions: Hindu Muslim

Languages
  - Local: Maithili
- Time zone: UTC+5:45 (NST)
- Postal Code: 45700
- Area code: 044
- Website: http://www.mahottarimun.gov.np/

Mahottari (Nepali: महोत्तरी ) is a rural municipality in Mahottari District in Madhes Province of Nepal. Established in 2016, it comprises six sections (wards) created from 6 former VDCs. It occupies an area of 28.08 sq. km with a total population of 27,430. Dilip Kumar Pandey of Terai Madhesh Loktantrik Party is the current chairman of the rural municipality who was elected in the 2022 local elections.

== Population ==
As of 2017, Mahottari hosts a total population of 27,784.

== See also ==
- Mahottari District
