= Ekdara Rural Municipality =

Ekdara Rural Municipality एकडारा गाउँपालिका
- Rural Municipality
- Location in Nepal
- Coordinates: 26.69°N 85.73°E
- Country: Nepal
- Development Region: Central
- District: Mahottari District
- Province: Province No. 2
- Established: 2016 A.D. (2073 B.S.)

Government
  - Type: स्थानीय सरकार

Area
  - Total: 24 km^{2} (9.3 sq mi)

Population (2011)
  - Total: 29,315
  - Density: 1,200/km^{2} (3,200/sq mi)
  - Religions: Hindu Muslim Christian

Languages
  - Local: Maithili, Tharu, Nepali
- Time zone: UTC+5:45 (NST)
- Postal Code: 45700
- Area code: 044
- Website: http://www.ekdaramun.gov.np/

Ekdara (Nepali: एकडारा ) is a rural municipality in Mahottari District in Province No. 2 of Nepal. Established in 2016, it is divided into six sections (wards) created from six former VDCs. It occupies an area of 24 km^{2} with a total population of 29,315.
