= Bahujan Shakti Party =

Political party

Bahujan Shakti Party बहुजन शक्ति पार्टी
- President: Biswendra Paswan
- Ideology: Human rights Social equality Secularism; Social justice Self respect

The Bahujan Shakti Party is a political party in Nepal led by Vishwendra Paswan.

== History ==
In the 2008 Constituent Assembly election, the party won 1 seat through the Proportional Representation vote.

The party was continuent of the NC-UML alliance. As of 2013, its independent in Constituent Assembly.

Bahujan Shakti Party won 1 seat in 2013 Nepalese Constituent Assembly election.

== Ideology ==
The Bahujan Shakti Party rejected in September the proposed 2015 Constitution stating that it did not provide rights to 85% of communities (that are marginalised by 15% Highest caste Hindus) in Nepal (Bahujan Samaj of Nepal). For ensuring rights to 85% Bahujan Samaj of Nepal in new Constitution of Nepal, Biswendra Paswan sat on Hunger strike. The demands in agendas of his agitation are:

- Guaranteed 14 percent representation of dalits in every state apparatus
- 15 per cent representation of the backward community of Nepal
- 10 per cent of Muslims of Nepal
- 37 per cent of the representation indigenous nationalities
- Capital punishment against those convicted guilty in the cases of corruption and rape.

== See also ==
- Bahujan Samaj
