= Loktantrik Samajwadi Party, Nepal =

Social democratic party in Nepal

Democratic Socialist Party, Nepal लोकतान्त्रिक समाजवादी पार्टी, नेपाल
- President: Mahantha Thakur
- Senior leader: Sharat Singh Bhandari
- Founded: 18 August 2021; 5 years ago
- Dissolved: 11 January 2025
- Split from: PSP-N
- Merged into: PSP-N
- Headquarters: Babarmahal, Kathmandu
- Student wing: Democratic Student Union
- Ideology: Madheshi regionalism Social democracy
- Political position: Centre-left
- Alliance: Democratic Alliance
- Colours
- House of Representatives: 4 / 275
- National Assembly: 1 / 59
- Madhesh Provincial Assembly: 9 / 107
- Lumbini Provincial Assembly: 3 / 87
- Mayors/Chairs: 16 / 753
- Councillors: 581 / 35,011

Election symbol

Party flag
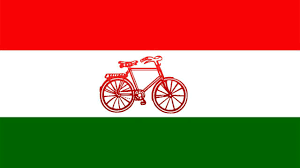

The Loktantrik Samajwadi Party, Nepal (Nepali: लोकतान्त्रिक समाजवादी पार्टी, lit. 'Democratic Socialist Party') was a former political party in Nepal. The party had a significant presence in Madhesh Province and Lumbini Province. The party's election symbol was the bicycle. The party later merged into People's Socialist Party, Nepal on 11 January 2025.

The party was officially registered with the Election Commission, Nepal on 18 August 2021. Mahantha Thakur is the president of the new party. As of August 2022, the party shares an alliance with Nepali Congress.

== Ideology ==
The party followed the norms of social democracy, identity and Madhesi rights.

Ideologically, the party was close to the Nepali Congress, while a majority of its leaders have been part of Congress at different points in time, especially before the 2006 Madhesh Movement. Party president Mahantha Thakur and senior leader Sharat Singh Bhandari were popular Congress men at one time. Thakur himself was treasurer and head of party disciplinary department before he left the Nepali Congress party. They were elected several times to the House of Representatives on the party ticket.

== History ==
=== Registration ===
The President of Nepal issued the second ordinance to amend the Political Parties Act on 18 August 2021. This opened the way to formalize the splits inside the dispute between two factions of Janata Samajbadi Party, Nepal. The faction of party led by Mahantha Thakur, which had a long dispute with party chairman Upendra Yadav registered their party with the Election Commission. At the time of the launch, the party claimed to have 13 members in the two national houses of parliament.

The new party was supported by 16 MLAs in Madhesh Provincial Assembly. A Central Committee with 24 members was announced as well. Senior leader of the Loktantrik Samajbadi Party Rajendra Mahato quit the party and announced a Rastriya Mukti Party.

=== First local election ===
The party emerged as fourth largest party of Madhesh province winning 16 local levels from among 753 local levels even standing alone in the elections. Nepali Congress emerged as single largest party of Madhesh province for second consecutive term, CPN (UML) emerged as second and while Janta Samajbadi was limited to third position.

=== First general election ===
In the mid of March, the party started talks with the Nepali Congress for a possible long term alliance between the two parties. Party chairman revealed this in a party meet in Janakpur on 22 March 2022. The party formed a committee for bilateral talks with Nepali Congress consisting Sharbendra Nath Shukla and Laxman Lal Karna in which party senior leader Sharat Singh Bhandari played vital role as mediator.

Bhandari had stood long for a Loktantrik alliance between democratic parties of Nepal. Both Loktantrik Samajwadi Party and Nepali Congress have some common ideologies including social democracy, democratic socialism. The party won 9 seats in Madhesh province while it won 3 seats in Lumbini province. However, in the general election it was limited to 4 seats only after being unable to cross 3% threshold due to wave of newly formed parties.

== List of Members of Parliament ==
=== Members of Rastriya Sabha ===
Loktantrik Samajwadi Party (1)
Constituency	Member	Portfolio & Responsibilities / Remarks
Madhesh	Shekhar Kumar Singh	Parliamentary party leader

=== Members of Pratinidhi Sabha ===
Loktantrik Samajwadi Party (4)
Constituency/PR group	Member	Portfolio & Responsibilities / Remarks
Mahottari 3	Mahantha Thakur	Parliamentary party leader
Sarlahi 1	Ram Prakash Chaudhary	Chief whip
Mahottari 2	Sharat Singh Bhandari	
Rupandehi 4	Sarbendra Nath Shukla	

== Electoral performance ==
=== General election ===
Election	Leader	Party list votes		Seats	Position	Resulting government
Election	Leader	No.	%	Seats	Position	Resulting government
2022	Mahantha Thakur	167,367	1.58 (Note: Represented as Independent for not reaching the 3% threshold)	4 / 275	9th	Confidence & supply

=== Provincial election ===
Province	Election	Party list votes		Seats	Position	Resulting government
Province	Election	No.	%	Seats	Position	Resulting government
Madhesh	2022	113,364	5.43	9 / 107	5th	Confidence & supply
Lumbini	2022	37,631	1.99	3 / 87	6th	Confidence & supply

=== Local election ===
Election	Leader	Mayoral seats won
2022	Mahantha Thakur	16 / 753

== List of cabinet ministers and chief ministers ==
=== Cabinet ministers ===
No.	Name	Portrait	Term of office		Days in office	Ministerial incharge
Central government
1	Sharat Singh Bhandari		31 March 2023	4 March 2024	339 days	Minister for Labour, Employment and Social Security
1	Sharat Singh Bhandari		15 July 2024	Incumbent	2 years, 124 days	Minister for Labour, Employment and Social Security
Madhesh government
1	Ramesh Prasad Kurmi		25 May 2023	16 April 2024	327 days	Minister for Forest and Environment
2	Rani Kumari Tiwari		18 July 2024	Incumbent	2 years, 121 days	Minister for Education and Culture
Lumbini government
1	Santosh Kumar Pandeya		28 April 2023	4 April 2024	342 days	Minister for Interior Affairs, Law and Co-operatives

=== Chief ministers ===
No.	Name	Portrait	Term of office		Days in office	Ministerial incharge
Madhesh government
1	Jitendra Prasad Sonal		16 October 2025	Incumbent	1 year, 31 days	Chief minister

== Leadership ==
=== Chairmen ===
- Mahantha Thakur (2021–present)

== See also ==
- Nepali Congress
- Janamat Party
- Mahantha Thakur
- Sharat Singh Bhandari
