= Saroj Kumar Yadav cabinet =

Madhesh province cabinet

- 2nd Cabinet of Madhesh Province

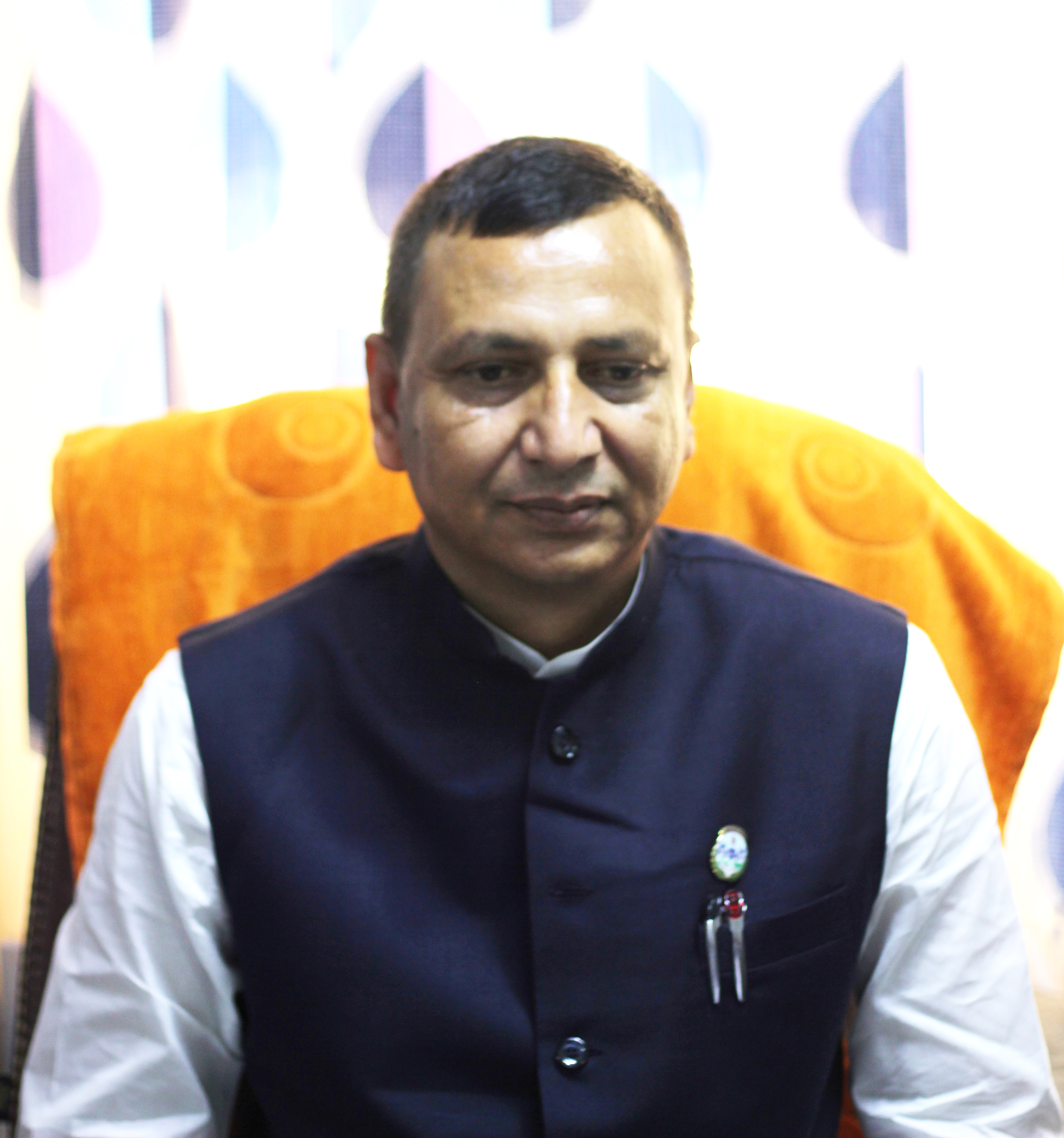
- Saroj Kumar Yadav
- Date formed: 12 January 2023
- Date dissolved: 5 June 2024

People and organisations
- Governor of Madhesh: Hari Shankar Mishra (till 15 March 2024), Sumitra Bhandari (from 15 March 2024)
- Head of government: Saroj Kumar Yadav
- Member parties: PSP-Nepal; CPN (UML); Congress; Janamat; Loktantrik Samajwadi; Maoist Centre; Unified Socialist
- Status in legislature: Majority-collision

History
- Election: 2022
- Legislature terms: 1 year, 145 days
- Predecessor: Lalbabu Raut cabinet
- Successor: Satish Kumar Singh cabinet

The Yadav cabinet was the second provincial government headed by Saroj Kumar Yadav in Madhesh Province, Nepal. The cabinet was formed after Saroj Kumar Yadav was sworn in as the Chief Minister of Madhesh Province on 12 January 2023.Yadav's claim for chief minister was supported by the seven political parties and two independent province assembly members.

On 19 January 2023, Yadav won a motion of confidence with 102 out of 102 votes in the 107-member Madhesh Provincial Assembly, where all political parties and independent members supported him.

On May 15, 2023, CPN (UML) retracted its support for the government. As a result, Chief Minister Yadav faced a vote of confidence for the second time on June 14, 2023, and successfully secured it.

Yadav allied with CPN (Unified Marxist–Leninist), Nepali Congress, Janamat Party, Loktantrik Samajwadi Party, Nepal, CPN (Maoist Centre) and CPN (Unified Socialist) on different occasions during his tenure.

After failure to secure the vote of confidence in Madhesh Provincial Assembly on 5 June 2024, he was relieved from his position.

This is a list of ministers and state ministers of the Yadav cabinet from January 2023 to June 2024.

== Councils of ministers ==
S.N.	Portfolio	Holder	Party	Constituency	Took office	Left office
Cabinet ministers
1	Chief Minister	Saroj Kumar Yadav	PSP-Nepal	Bara 1 (B)	13 January 2023	5 June 2024
-	Minister without portfolio	Saroj Kumar Yadav	CPN (UML)	Mahottari 4 (A)	13 January 2023	25 January 2023
2	Minister for Physical Infrastructure Development	Saroj Kumar Yadav	CPN (UML)	Mahottari 4 (A)	26 January 2023	4 April 2023
2	Minister for Physical Infrastructure Development	Krishna Prasad Yadav	Nepali Congress	Rautahat 1 (B)	23 May 2023	18 March 2024
2	Minister for Physical Infrastructure Development	Saroj Kumar Yadav	CPN (UML)	Mahottari 4 (A)	18 March 2024	12 May 2024
-	Minister without portfolio	Sanjay Kumar Yadav	PSP-Nepal	Sarlahi 3 (B)	13 January 2023	25 January 2023
3	Minister for Finance	Sanjay Kumar Yadav	PSP-Nepal	Sarlahi 3 (B)	26 January 2023	5 June 2024
-	Minister without portfolio	Basant Kumar Kushwaha	Janamat		13 January 2023	25 January 2023
4	Minister for Land Management, Agriculture and Cooperatives	Basant Kumar Kushwaha	Janamat		26 January 2023	22 May 2023
4	Minister for Land Management, Agriculture and Cooperatives	Govinda Bahadur Neupane	CPN (Unified Socialist)	Saptari 4 (A)	23 May 2023	4 June 2024
-	Minister without portfolio	Basant Kumar Kushwaha	Janamat		23 May 2023	31 July 2023
5	Minister for Education, Science, Technology and Commerce	Mahesh Prasad Yadav	Janamat	Saptari 2 (B)	3 February 2023	23 May 2023
-	Minister for Education and Social Welfare	Mahesh Prasad Yadav	Janamat	Saptari 2 (B)	23 May 2023	31 July 2023
-	Minister for Education and Culture	Mahesh Prasad Yadav	Janamat	Saptari 2 (B)	31 July 2023	23 January 2024
-	Minister for Education and Culture	Pramod Kumar Jaisawal	CPN (UML)	Parsa 3 (A)	23 March 2024	12 May 2024
6	Minister for Social Development	Surita Kumari Sah	PSP-Nepal	Mahottari 2 (B)	3 February 2023	22 May 2023
-	Minister without portfolio	Surita Kumari Sah	PSP-Nepal	Mahottari 2 (B)	23 May 2023	6 October 2023
7	Minister for Sports and Social Welfare	Surita Kumari Sah	PSP-Nepal	Mahottari 2 (B)	6 October 2023	5 June 2024
8	Minister for Home Affairs and Communication	Shatrudhan Prasad Singh	CPN (UML)	Siraha 2 (B)	3 February 2023	4 April 2023
8	Minister for Home Affairs and Communication	Mohammad Samim	Nepali Congress	Saptari 3 (A)	31 July 2023	18 March 2024
8	Minister for Home Affairs, Communication and Law	Raj Kumar Lekhi	CPN (UML)	Saptari 1 (A)	23 March 2024	12 May 2024
9	Minister for Water, Irrigation and Energy Development	Singhasan Sah Kalwar	PSP-Nepal	Parsa 4 (B)	3 February 2023	5 June 2024
10	Minister for Law, Justice and Provincial Assembly Affairs	Raj Kumar Lekhi	CPN (UML)	Saptari 1 (A)	3 February 2023	4 April 2023
11	Minister for Women, Children, Youth and Sports	Mohammad Zaid Alam	CPN (UML)	Rautahat (A)	3 February 2023	4 April 2023
12	Minister for Health and Population	Birendra Prasad Singh	Nepali Congress	Sarlahi 4 (A)	23 May 2023	18 March 2024
12	Minister for Health and Population	Shatrudhan Prasad Singh	CPN (UML)	Siraha 2 (B)	23 March 2024	12 May 2024
13	Minister for Forest and Environment	Ramesh Prasad Kurmi	Loktantrik Samajwadi	Parsa 2(B)	25 May 2023	16 April 2024
13	Minister for Forest and Environment	Bharat Prasad Sah	CPN (Maoist Centre)	Mahottari 1(B)	28 April 2024	12 May 2024
14	Minister for Industry, Commerce and Tourism	Sunita Yadav	CPN (Maoist Centre)		7 February 2023	18 April 2024
14	Minister for Industry, Commerce and Tourism	Yuvaraj Bhattarai	CPN (Maoist Centre)	Rautahat 4(A)	18 April 2024	12 May 2024
15	Minister for Labour and Transport	Chandan Kumar Singh	Janamat Party		31 July 2023	23 January 2024
15	Minister for Labour and Transport	Bechi Lungeli	CPN (Unified Socialist)	Sarlahi 1(B)	24 April 2024	4 June 2024
16	Minister for Non-Departmental	Bharat Prasad Sah	CPN (Maoist Centre)	Mahottari 1(B)	18 April 2024	28 April 2024
16	Minister for Non-Departmental	Bechi Lungeli	CPN (Unified Socialist)	Sarlahi 1(B)	18 April 2024	23 April 2024
State ministers
1	Minister of State for Health and Population	Sheikh Abul Kalam Azad	PSP-Nepal	Rautahat 4 (B)	3 February 2023	22 May 2023
-	State Minister without portfolio	Sheikh Abul Kalam Azad	PSP-Nepal	Rautahat 4 (B)	23 May 2023	30 July 2023
-	Minister of State for Water, Irrigation and Energy Development	Sheikh Abul Kalam Azad	PSP-Nepal	Rautahat 4 (B)	31 July 2023	5 June 2024
2	Minister of State for Home Affairs and Communication	Keshav Ray	CPN (UML)	Rautahat 3(A)	3 February 2023	4 April 2023
-	Minister of State for Health and Population	Keshav Ray	CPN (UML)	Rautahat 3(A)	23 March 2024	12 May 2024
3	Minister of State for Land Management, Agriculture and Cooperatives	Sanjay Kumar Yadav	Janamat	Siraha 2 (A)	3 February 2023	22 May 2023
-	State Minister without portfolio	Sanjay Kumar Yadav	Janamat	Siraha 2 (A)	23 May 2023	31 July 2023
4	Minister of State for Industry, Commerce and Tourism	Rahbar Ansari	CPN (Maoist Centre)	Parsa 1 (A)	23 May 2023	12 May 2024
5	Minister of State for Home Affairs, Communication and Law	Sharda Devi Thapa	CPN (UML)	Mahottari 1(A)	18 April 2024	12 May 2024
