= 2022 Madhesh Provincial Assembly election =

Nepalese election

2022 Provincial Assembly election of Madhesh Province
- 20 November 2022

All 107 seats in the Provincial Assembly of Madhesh Province 54 seats needed for a majority
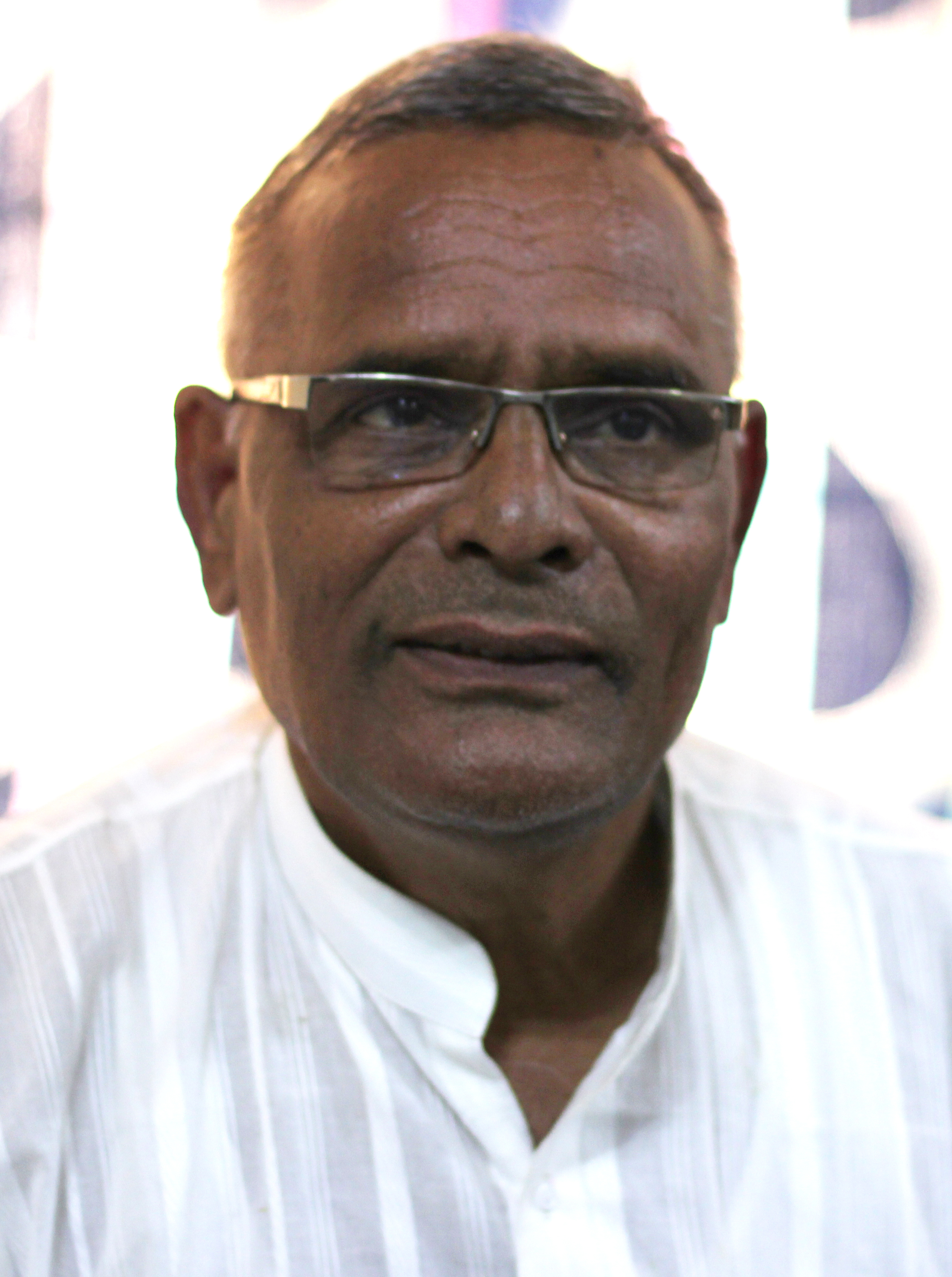

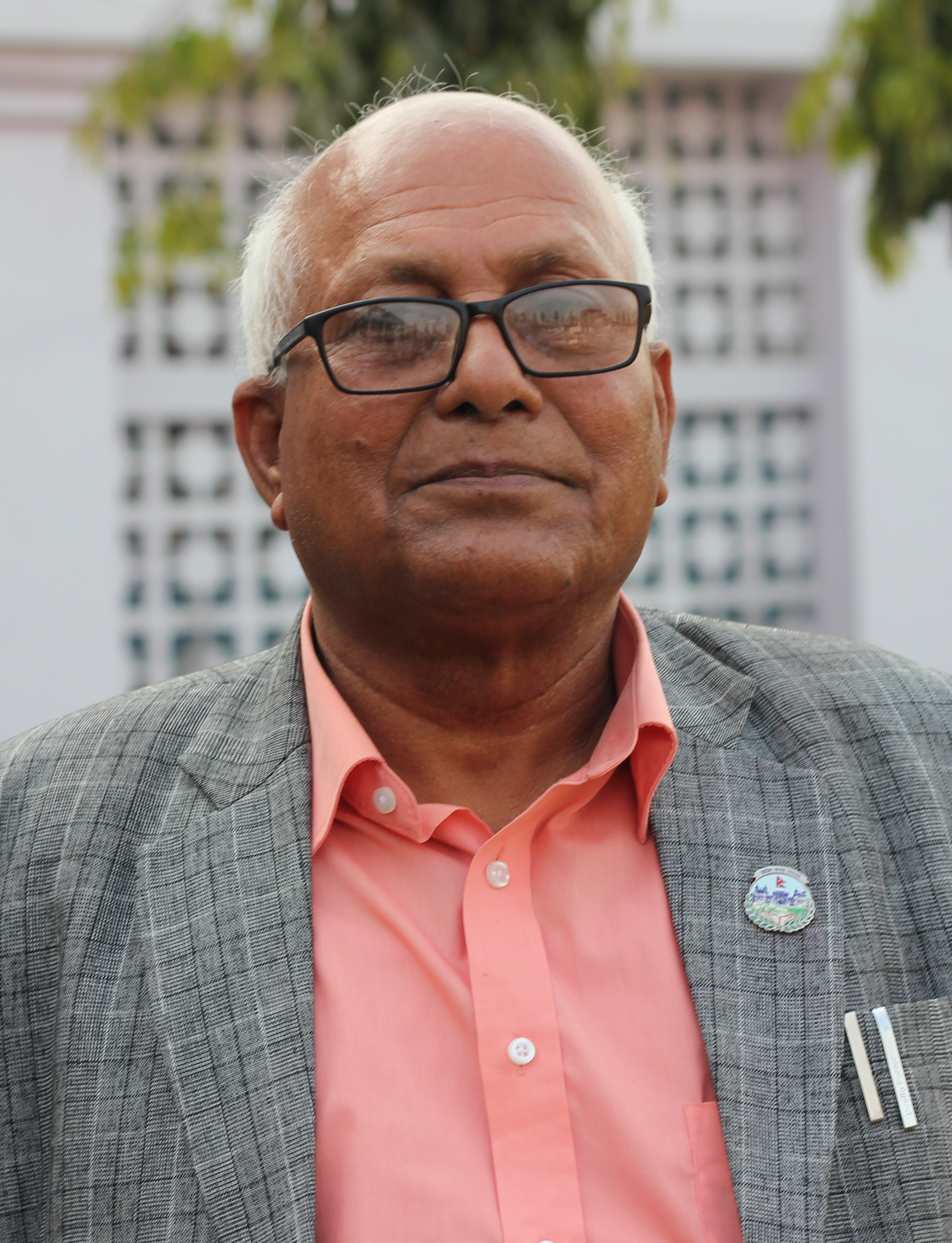

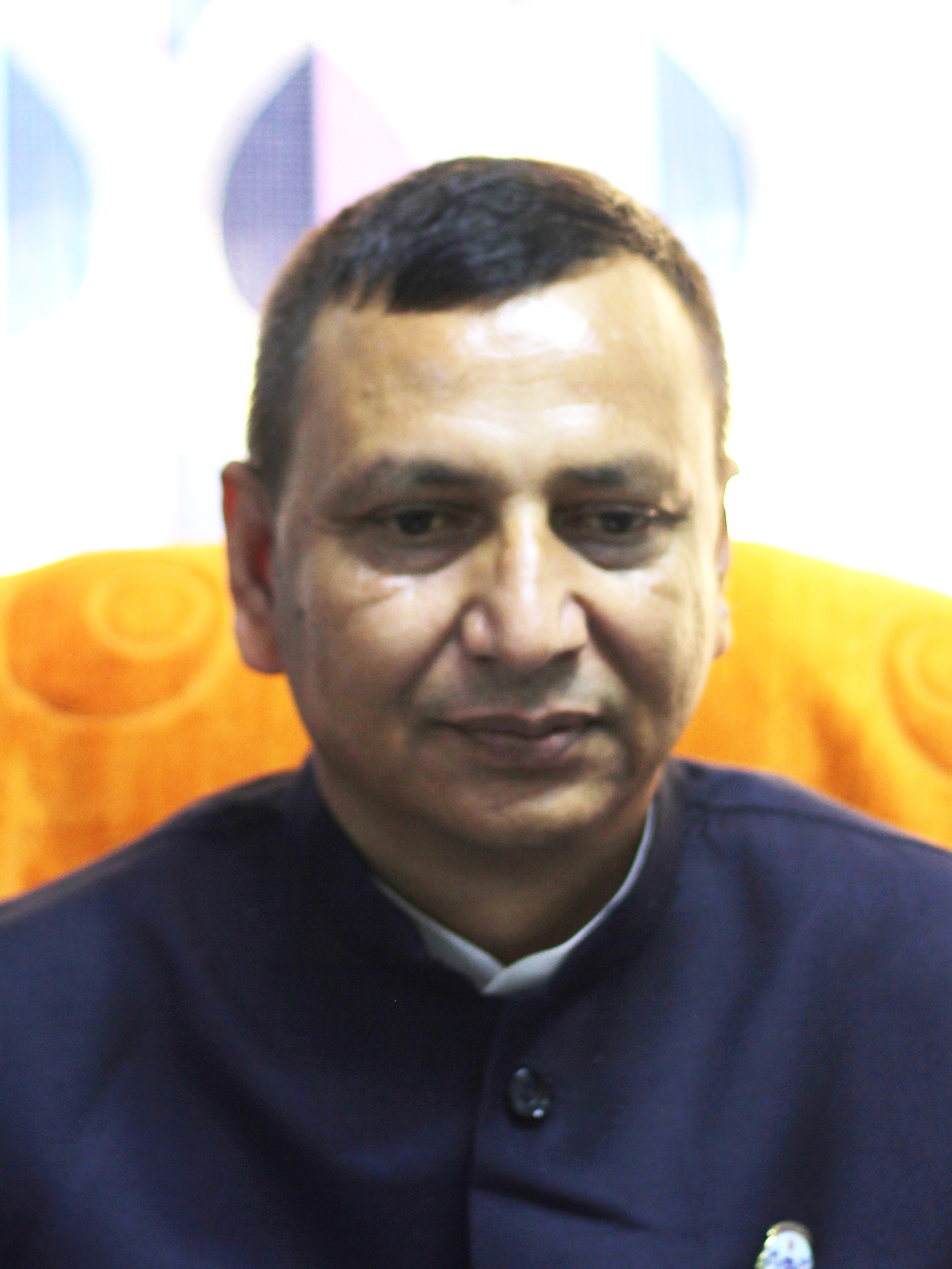

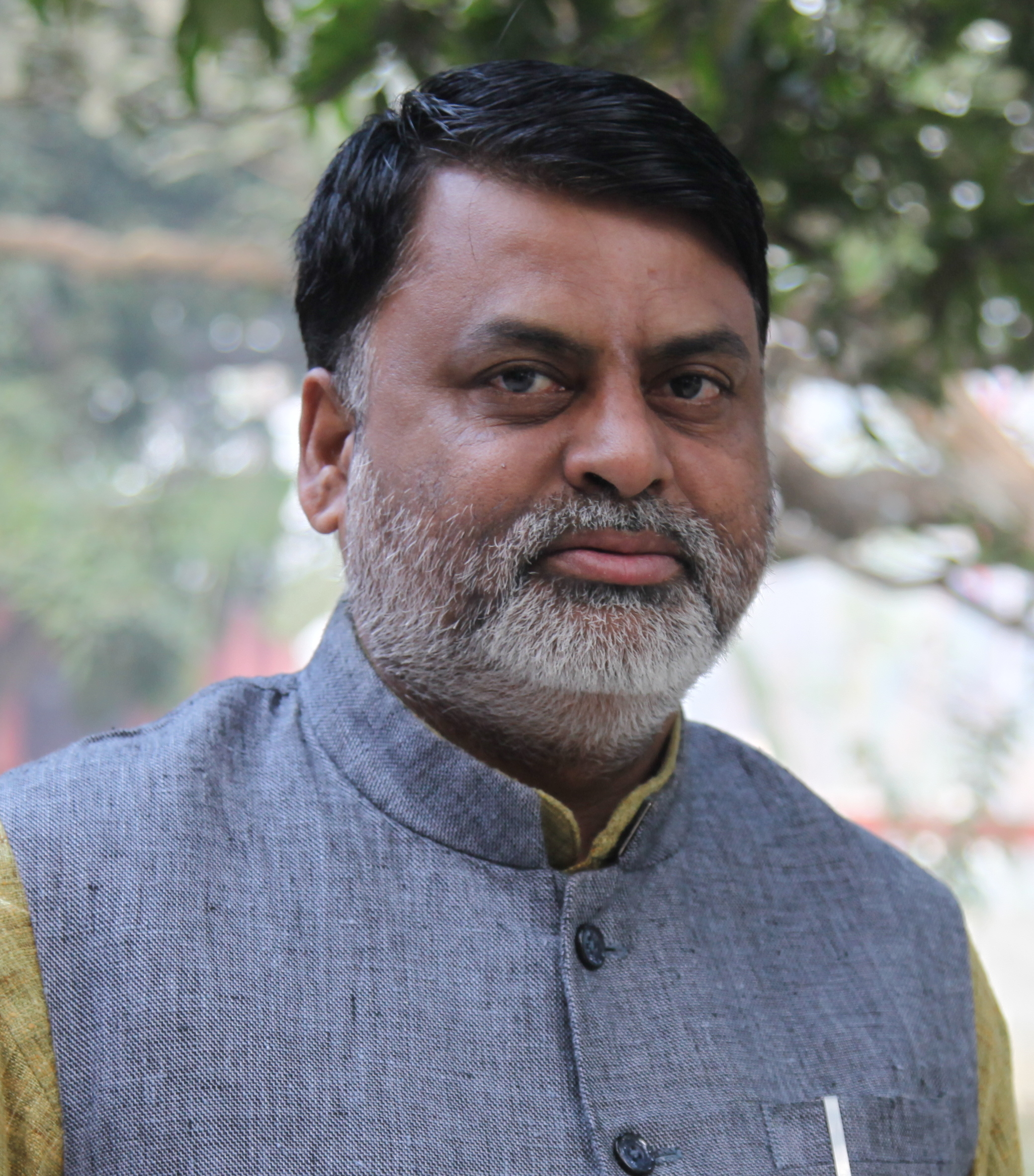

	First party	Second party	Third party
Leader	Ram Saroj Yadav	Satya Narayan Mandal	Saroj Kumar Yadav
Party	Congress	CPN (UML)	PSP-Nepal
Leader since	2021	2017	2017
Leader's seat	Dhanusha 3(A)	Not contesting	Bara 1(B)
Last election	27.82% 19 seats	16.25% 22 seats	New Party
Seats before	19	8	39
Seats after	22	23	16
Seat change	▲3	▲15	▼23
	Fourth party	Fifth party	Sixth party
Leader	Mahesh Prasad Yadav	Bharat Prasad Sah	Satrudhan Mahato
Party	Janamat	Maoist Centre	Unified Socialist
Leader since	2022	2021	2021
Leader's seat	Saptari 2(B)	Mahottari 1(B)	Dhanusha 4(B)
Last election	New Party	11.88% 11 seats	New Party
Seats before	0	8	13
Seats after	13	8	7
Seat change	▲13		▼6
	Seventh party	Eighth party
Leader	Jitendra Prasad Sonal	Bharat Giri
Party	Loktantrik Samajwadi	RPP
Leader since	2021	2022
Leader's seat	Bara 4(B)	Not contesting
Last election	New Party
Seats before	16	0
Seats after	9	1
Seat change	▼7	▲1
Chief Minister before election
Mohammad Lalbabu Raut
PSP-N
Elected Chief Minister
Saroj Yadav
PSP-N

Provincial assembly elections were held in Nepal on 20 November 2022. The discussion to conduct sooner than later is underway due to interest of leading Nepali Congress while the opposition, CPN (UML) is already demanding for fresh mandate.

== Parties ==
=== Current composition ===
Party	Ideology	2017 result			Current seats
Party	Ideology	Votes (%)		Seats	Current seats
Nepali Congress	Social democracy/Third Way	24.11		19 / 107	22 / 107
CPN (Unified Marxist–Leninist)	Marxism–Leninism	16.25		22 / 107	8 / 107
CPN (Maoist Centre)	Marxism–Leninism–Maoism–Prachanda Path	11.88		11 / 107	8 / 107
CPN (Unified Socialist)	Marxism–Leninism	New Party			14 / 107
People's Socialist Party, Nepal	Democratic Socialism	RJPN	20.72	25 / 107	33 / 107
People's Socialist Party, Nepal	Democratic Socialism	FSFN	18.48	29 / 107	33 / 107
People's Socialist Party, Nepal	Democratic Socialism	Independent		1 / 275	33 / 107
Loktantrik Samajwadi Party, Nepal	Social democracy	New party			16 / 107
Nepal Socialist Party	Social democracy	New party			3 / 107

== Candidates ==
Constituency		Nepali Congress+		CPN (UML)+	
Constituency		Party	Candidate	Party	Candidate
Saptari 1	A	LSP-N	Tulsi Prasad Chaudhary		
Saptari 1	B	NC	Badri Narayan Mahatman Yadav		
Saptari 2	A	LSP-N	Saroj Kumar Mandal		
Saptari 2	B	CPN (MC)	Umesh Kumar Yadav		
Saptari 3	A	NC	Mohammad Samim		
Saptari 3	B	NC	Bhagwati Prasad Yadav		
Saptari 4	A	CPN (US)	Govind Bahadur Neupane		
Saptari 4	B	NC	Indra Dev Yadav		
Siraha 1	A	NC	Sunil Kumar Mahato		
Siraha 1	B	CPN (US)	Ashok Kumar Yadav		
Siraha 2	A	CPN (MC)	Jeebach Kumar Yadav		
Siraha 2	B	CPN (US)	Madansen Prasad Shreevasatav		
Siraha 3	A	NC	Ram Sagun Yadav		
Siraha 3	B	NC	Sanjay Prakash Yadav		
Siraha 4	A	CPN (MC)	Mahendra Paswan		
Siraha 4	B	LSP-N	Ram Babu Yadav		
Dhanusha 1	A	NC	Sanjay Kumar Mahato		
Dhanusha 1	B	LSP-N	Sanjay Kumar Singh		
Dhanusha 2	A	LSP-N	Sanjay Kumar Sah		
Dhanusha 2	B	CPN (US)	Shailendra Kumar Yadav		
Dhanusha 3	A	NC	Ram Saroj Yadav		
Dhanusha 3	B	NC	Hari Shankar Sah		
Dhanusha 4	A	NC	Shesh Narayan Yadav		
Dhanusha 4	B	CPN (US)	Satrudhan Mahato		
Mahottari 1	A	LSP-N	Pitambar Mahato		
Mahottari 1	B	CPN (MC)	Bharat Prasad Sah		
Mahottari 2	A	LSP-N	Jayanul Rain		
Mahottari 2	B	NC	Nageshwar Yadav		
Mahottari 3	A	LSP-N	Abhiram Sharma		
Mahottari 3	B	LSP-N	Rani Kumari Tiwari		
Mahottari 4	A	LSP-N	Kaushal Kumar Yadav		
Mahottari 4	B	CPN (MC)	Lalendra Kumar Mandal		
Sarlahi 1	A	LSP-N	Upendra Mahato		
Sarlahi 1	B	CPN (US)	Bechi Lungeli		
Sarlahi 2	A	NC	Jangi Lal Ray		
Sarlahi 2	B	NC	Kaushal Kishor Ray		
Sarlahi 3	A	CPN (US)	Dilli Prasad Upreti		
Sarlahi 3	B	NC	Haresh Prasad Mahato		
Sarlahi 4	A	NC	Birendra Prasad Singh		
Sarlahi 4	B	CPN (MC)	Fakira Mahato		
Rautahat 1	A	NC	Nagendra Sah		
Rautahat 1	B	NC	Krishna Prasad Yadav		
Rautahat 2	A	LSP-N	Shekh Jamsedh		
Rautahat 2	B	CPN (MC)	Surendra Prasad Jayasbal		
Rautahat 3	A	CPN (US)	Nagendra Raya Yadav		
Rautahat 3	B	NC	Sunil Kumar Yadav		
Rautahat 4	A	CPN (US)	Bal Krishna Shrestha		
Rautahat 4	B	CPN (US)	Shekh Satar Ahmad		
Bara 1	A	NC	Ramesh Prasad Dangal		
Bara 1	B	NC	Nagendra Prasad Kanu		
Bara 2	A	LSP-N	Moti Lal Prasad		
Bara 2	B	NC	Ram Ayodhya Prasad Yadav		
Bara 3	A	CPN (MC)	Mukesh Sah		
Bara 3	B	NC	Jay Chandra Prasad Chaurasiya		
Bara 4	A	CPN (MC)	Chetra Bahadur Shrestha		
Bara 4	B	LSP-N	Jitendra Prasad Sonal		
Parsa 1	A	CPN (MC)	Rahabar Ansari		
Parsa 1	B	NC	Ram Narayan Prasad Kurmi		
Parsa 2	A	NC	Shyam Prasad Patel		
Parsa 2	B	LSP-N	Ramesh Prasad Kurmi		
Parsa 3	A	CPN (MC)	Chotte Lal Prasad Yadav		
Parsa 3	B	NC	Janardan Singh Chhetri		
Parsa 4	A	NC	Shankar Prasad Kurmi		
Parsa 4	B	CPN (MC)	Chand Tara Kurmi		

== Alliance ==
=== Democratic alliance ===
No.	Party	Flag	Symbol	Leader	Photo	Seats Contested	Male Candidates	Female Candidates
1.	Nepali Congress			Ram Saroj Yadav		27	TBD	TBD
2.	Loktantrik Samajwadi Party, Nepal			Jitendra Prasad Sonal		15	TBD	TBD
3.	CPN (Unified Socialist)			Satrudhan Mahato		11	TBD	TBD
4.	CPN (Maoist Centre)			Bharat Prasad Sah		10	TBD	TBD
5.	Socialist Party of Nepal			Ram Naresh Ray Yadav		1	1	0

=== CPN (UML)+ ===
No.	Party	Flag	Symbol	Leader	Photo	Seats Contested	Male Candidates	Female Candidates
1.	Communist Party of Nepal (Unified Marxist–Leninist)			Satya Narayan Mandal		32	TBD	TBD
2.	People's Socialist Party, Nepal			Mohammad Lalbabu Raut		32	TBD	TBD

=== RPP+ ===
No.	Party	Flag	Symbol	Leader	Photo	Seats contested	Male candidates	Female candidates
1.	Rastriya Prajatantra Party			Rajendra Prasad Lingden		TBD	TBD	TBD

=== Others ===
No.	Party	Flag	Symbol	Leader	Photo	Seats Contested	Chief Candidates	Deputy chief Candidates
1.	Bidrohi CPN (UML)			Prabhu Sah	17	TBD	TBD	
2.	Terai Madhesh Loktantrik Party			Brikhesh Chandra Lal		TBD	TBD	TBD
3.	People's Progressive Party			Shivajee Yadav		TBD	TBD	TBD
4.	Janamat Party		Janamat Party Election Symbol	Kishori Sah Kamal		TBD	TBD	TBD
5.	People's Freedom Party			Resham Lal Chaudhary		TBD	TBD	TBD

== Opinion poll ==
Party	FPTP	PR	Total
Party	Seats	Seats	Total
Nepali Congress	17-20	11-13	28-33
CPN (Unified Marxist-Leninist)	11-13	9-10	19-23
People's Socialist Party, Nepal	9-11	6-8	15-19
Loktantrik Samajwadi Party, Nepal	7-8	5-6	12-14
CPN (Maoist Centre)	8-9	6-8	14-17
Nepal Socialist Party	8-9	6-8	14-17
CPN (Unified Socialist)	4-5	3-5	7-10
Janamat Party	3-4	2-3	0-1
Independent	0-1		0-1
Invalid/Blank votes			
Total	64	43	107
Registered voters/turnout			

== Result ==
Party	FPTP			PR			Total
Party	Votes	%	Seats	Votes	%	Seats	Total
Nepali Congress			13	303958	20.14	9	22
CPN (Unified Marxist-Leninist)			15	268048	17.77	8	23
People's Socialist Party, Nepal			8	211690	14.03	7	15
Janamat Party			6	203892	13.51	6	12
CPN (Maoist Centre)			4	128737	8.53	4	8
CPN (Unified Socialist)			4	89012	5.89	3	7
Loktantrik Samajwadi Party, Nepal			7	74319	4.92	2	9
Rastriya Prajatantra Party			0	52415	3.47	2	2
Nagrik Unmukti Party			0	39656	2.63	1	1
Nepal Federal Socialist Party			0	38771	2.56	1	1
Others			0	98134	6.5		0
Independent			6	-			6
Invalid/Blank votes							
Total		100	64	1508692	100	43	107
Registered voters/turnout							

== See also ==
- 2022 elections in Nepal
- 2021 split in the People's Socialist Party, Nepal
- 2021 split in Nepalese Communist Parties
