= Jitendra Prasad Sonal cabinet =

Madhesh province cabinet

- 4th Cabinet of Madhesh Province
- Date formed: 16 October 2025
- Date dissolved: 8 November 2025

People and organisations
- Governor of Madhesh: Sumitra Bhandari
- Head of government: Jitendra Prasad Sonal
- No. of ministers: 3
- Member parties: Loktantrik Samajwadi Coalition partner; PSP-Nepal; Janamat; Maoist Centre; Unified Socialist
- Status in legislature: Majority-collision 56 / 107 (52%) (October - November 2025)
- Opposition party: CPN (UML); Congress

History
- Election: 2022
- Legislature term: 23 days
- Predecessor: Satish Kumar Singh cabinet
- Successor: Saroj Yadav cabinet

The Sonal cabinet was the fourth provincial government headed by Jitendra Prasad Sonal in Madhesh Province, Nepal. The cabinet was formed after Sonal was sworn in as the Chief Minister of Madhesh Province on 16 October 2025.

Sonal had staked a claim to the post of chief minister with the support of 19 lawmakers from the PSP, Nepal, 13 from the Janamat, 8 from CPN (Maoist Centre), 7 from CPN (Unified Socialist), 9 from LSP, Nepal.

After failure to secure the vote of confidence in Madhesh Provincial Assembly on 8 November 2025, he stepped down from his position.

This is a list of ministers and state ministers of the Yadav cabinet from October 2025 to November 2025.

== Councils of ministers ==
S.N.	Portfolio	Holder	Party	Constituency	Took office	Left office
Cabinet ministers
1	Chief Minister; All other ministries not allocated to anyone.	Jitendra Prasad Sonal	Loktantrik Samajwadi	Bara 4 (B)	16 October 2025	8 November 2025
-	Minister without portfolio	Mahesh Prasad Yadav	Janamat Party	Saptari 2 (B)	16 October 2025	8 November 2025
-	Minister without portfolio	Kanish Patel	CPN (Unified Socialist)	Rautahat 2 (B)	16 October 2025	8 November 2025
