= Krishna Prasad Yadav cabinet =

Madhesh province cabinet

- 6th Cabinet of Madhesh Province
- Date formed: 5 December 2025
- Date dissolved: 14 November 2026

People and organisations
- Governor: Surendra Labh Karna
- Chief Minister: Krishna Prasad Yadav
- No. of ministers: 12
- Member parties: Congress Coalition partner; CPN (UML); NCP
- Status in legislature: Majority-collision 61 / 107 (57%)
- Opposition party: PSP-Nepal; Janamat; Loktantrik Samajwadi; Nagrik Unmukti

History
- Election: 2022
- Legislature term: 344 days
- Predecessor: Saroj Yadav cabinet

The Krishna Yadav cabinet was the sixth provincial government headed by Krishna Prasad Yadav in Madhesh Province, Nepal. The cabinet was formed after Yadav was sworn in as the Chief Minister of Madhesh Province on 7 December 2025.

== History ==
Yadav's claim for chief minister was supported by the CPN Unified Marxist–Leninist), PSP, Nepal, Janamat, CPN (Maoist Centre), CPN (Unified Socialist), LSP, Nepal and Nagrik Unmukti Party.

On 19 December 2025, Yadav won a motion of confidence with 92 out of 92 votes in the 107-member of Madhesh Provincial Assembly.

Mahesh Prasad Yadav and Basant Kumar Kushwaha of Janamat Party resigned from their post and withdrew their support from the government on May 21, 2026. Krishna Prasad Yadav was set for the vote of confidence for second time but CPN (UML) supported the government on May 22, 2026.

The cabinet was reshuffled on May 22, 2026, with a coalition with CPN (UML) and the Nepali Communist Party led by Nepali Congress leader Krishna Prasad Yadav.

== Councils of ministers ==
=== May 2026 – November 2026 ===
S.N.	Portfolio	Holder	Party	Constituency	Took office	Left office
Cabinet ministers
1	Chief Minister; All other ministries not allocated to anyone.	Krishna Prasad Yadav	Congress	Rautahat 1 (B)	5 December 2025	Incumbent
2	Minister for Physical Infrastructure Development	Mohammad Sameer	CPN (UML)	Bara 3 (B)	26 May 2026	Incumbent
3	Minister for Finance	Yubaraj Bhattarai	NCP	Rautahat 4 (A)	26 May 2026	Incumbent
4	Minister for Sports and Social Welfare	Lakhan Das Tatma	CPN (UML)	Dhanusha 2 (A)	26 May 2026	Incumbent
5	Minister for Forest and Environment	Shankar Prasad Chaudhary	Congress	Parsa 4 (A)	31 December 2025	Incumbent
6	Minister for Labour and Transport	Sharada Devi Thapa	CPN (UML)	Mahottari 1 (A)	26 May 2026	Incumbent
7	Minister for Industry, Commerce and Tourism	Kanish Patel	NCP	Rautahat 2 (B)	15 December 2025	Incumbent
8	Minister for Land Management, Agriculture and Cooperatives	Shyam Prasad Patel	Congress	Parsa 2 (A)	31 December 2025	Incumbent
9	Minister for Energy, Irrigation and Water	Jawahar Lal Kushwaha	NCP	Sarlahi 3 (A)	15 December 2025	Incumbent
10	Minister for Home Affairs, Communications and Law	Fakeera Mahato	NCP	Sarlahi 4 (B)	31 December 2025	Incumbent
11	Minister for Education and Culture	Manoj Kumar Singh	CPN (UML)	Siraha 3 (A)	26 May 2026	Incumbent
12	Minister for Health and Population	Nagendra Sah	Congress	Rautahat 1 (A)	26 May 2026	Incumbent

=== December 2025 – May 2026 ===
S.N.	Portfolio	Holder	Party	Constituency	Took office	Left office
Cabinet ministers
1	Chief Minister; All other ministries not allocated to anyone.	Krishna Prasad Yadav	Congress	Rautahat 1 (B)	5 December 2025	Incumbent
2	Minister for Finance	Mahesh Prasad Yadav	Janamat	Saptari 2 (B)	5 December 2025	21 May 2026
-	Minister without portfolio	Jangilal Ray Yadav	Nepali Congress	Sarlahi 2 (A)	5 December 2025	14 December 2025
3	Minister for Health and Population	Jangilal Ray Yadav	Nepali Congress	Sarlahi 2 (A)	15 December 2025	26 May 2026
-	Minister without portfolio	Kanish Patel	NCP	Rautahat 2 (B)	5 December 2025	14 December 2025
4	Minister for Industry, Commerce and Tourism	Kanish Patel	NCP	Rautahat 2 (B)	15 December 2025	Incumbent
5	Minister for Energy, Irrigation and Water	Jawahar Lal Kushwaha	NCP	Sarlahi 3 (A)	15 December 2025	Incumbent
6	Minister for Education and Culture	Rani Kumari Tiwari	Loktantrik Samajwadi	Mahottari 3 (B)	15 December 2025	21 May 2026
7	Minister for Labour and Transport	Manish Kumar Suman	PSP-Nepal	PR Madheshi	31 December 2025	21 May 2026
8	Minister for Physical Infrastructure Development	Raj Kumar Gupta	PSP-Nepal	Siraha 1 (B)	31 December 2025	21 May 2026
9	Minister for Forest and Environment	Shankar Prasad Chaudhary	Congress	Parsa 4 (A)	31 December 2025	Incumbent
10	Minister for Land Management, Agriculture and Cooperatives	Shyam Prasad Patel	Congress	Parsa 2 (A)	31 December 2025	Incumbent
11	Minister for Sports and Social Welfare	Basant Kumar Kushwaha	Janamat	PR Madheshi	31 December 2025	21 May 2026
12	Minister for Home Affairs, Communication and Law	Fakeera Mahato	NCP	Sarlahi 4 (B)	31 December 2025	Incumbent
