= Satish Kumar Singh cabinet =

- 3rd Cabinet of Madhesh Province
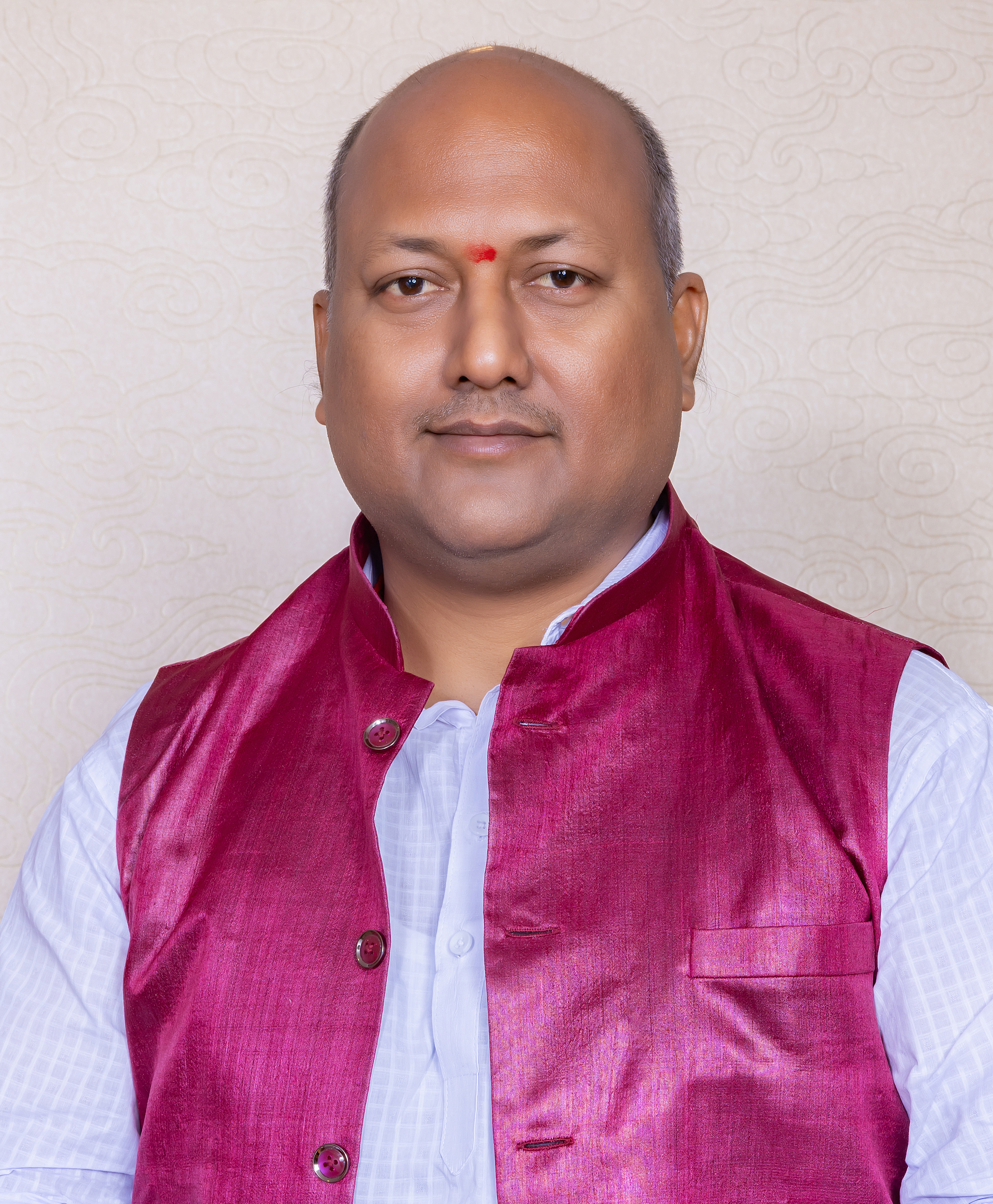
- Satish Kumar Singh
- Date formed: 7 June 2024

People and organisations
- Governor: Sumitra Bhandari
- Chief Minister: Satish Kumar Singh
- Member parties: 4 Major parties: Nepali Congress; Communist Party of Nepal (Unified Marxist–Leninist); Minor party: Janamat Party; Loktantrik Samajwadi Party, Nepal
- Status in legislature: Majority-collision
- Opposition party: People's Socialist Party, Nepal
- Opposition leader: Saroj Kumar Yadav

History
- Election: 2022
- Legislature term: 5 years
- Predecessor: Saroj Kumar Yadav cabinet
- Successor: Jitendra Prasad Sonal cabinet

The Singh cabinet is the Council of Ministers headed by Satish Kumar Singh in Madhesh Province, Nepal. Singh from Janamat Party was sworn in the Chief Ministers of Madhesh Province in June 2024. Present arrangement of cabinet is the result of power sharing agreement between Nepali Congress, CPN (UML), Loktantrik Samajwadi Party and Janamat Party.

This is a brief list of minister is as given below.

== Current arrangement ==
S.N.	Portfolio	Holder	Party	Constituency	Took office	Took office
Chief minister
1	Chief Minister	Satish Kumar Singh	Janamat	Saptari 2 (B)	7 June 2023	
Cabinet ministers
2	Minister for Physical Infrastructure Development	Saroj Kumar Yadav	CPN (UML)	Mahottari 4 (A)	7 June 2023	
3	Minister for Land Management, Agriculture and Cooperatives	Janardan Singh Chhetri	Nepali Congress	Parsa 3 (B)	18 July 2024	
4	Minister for Education and Culture	Rani Kumari Tiwari	Loktantrik Samajwadi	Mahottari 3 (B)	18 July 2024	
5	Minister for Home, Communications and Law	Raj Kumar Lekhi	CPN (UML)	Saptari 1 (A)	7 June 2023	
6	Minister for Health and Population	Satrudhan Prasad Singh	CPN (UML)	Siraha 2 (B)	7 June 2023	
7	Minister for Finance	Sunil Kumar Yadav	Nepali Congress	Rautahat 3 (B)	18 July 2024	
8	Minister for Sports and Social Welfare	Pramod Kumar Jaiswal	CPN (UML)	Parsa 3 (A)	7 June 2023	
9	Minister for Forests and Environment	Tribhuwan Sah	Janamat	Siraha 4 (A)	7 June 2023	
10	Minister for Energy, Irrigation and Water Supply	Shesh Narayan Yadav	Nepali Congress	Dhanusha 4 (A)	18 July 2024	
11	Minister for Industry, Commerce and Tourism	Sakil Ali Miya	Janamat Party		18 July 2024	
12	Minister for Labor and Transport	Kaushal Kishor Ray	Nepali Congress	Sarlahi 2 (B)	18 July 2024	

== Ministers by party ==
1. Nepali Congress (35.0%)
2. CPN (UML) (35.0%)
3. Janamat Party (18.0%)
4. LSP-N (6.00%)
5. NFSP (6.00%)

Party	Cabinet Ministers	Ministers of State	Total Ministers
Nepali Congress	4	2	6
CPN (UML)	4	2	6
Janamat	2	1	3
Loktantrik Samajwadi	1	0	1
