= Lalbabu Raut cabinet =

- 1st Cabinet of Madhesh Province
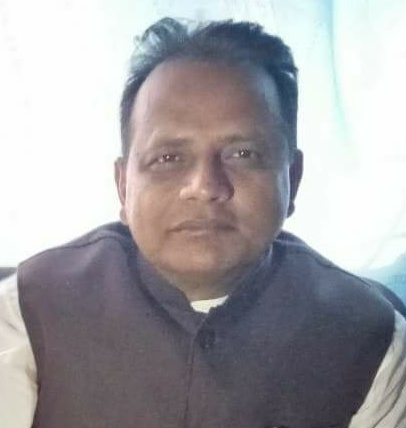
- Mohammad Lalbabu Raut
- Date formed: 15 February 2018

People and organisations
- Head of state: Hari Shankar Mishra (as Governor of Madhesh Province )
- Head of government: Mohammad Lalbabu Raut
- No. of ministers: 14
- Ministers removed: 7
- Total no. of members: 21
- Member parties: 4 Major parties: People's Socialist Party, Nepal; Nepali Congress; Minor party: CPN(Unified Socialist); CPN(Maoist Centre)
- Status in legislature: Majority-collision
- Opposition party: Loktantrik Samajwadi Party, Nepal
- Opposition leader: Jitendra Prasad Sonal

History
- Election: 2017
- Legislature term: 5 years
- Predecessor: Province created

The Raut Cabinet is the Council of Ministers headed by Mohammad Lalbabu Raut in Madhesh Province, Nepal. Mohammad Lalbabu Raut from Federal Socialist Forum, Nepal was sworn in the Chief Ministers of Madhesh Province in February 2018. Present arrangement of cabinet is the result of talk between two Former Deputy Prime Ministers, PSP-N President Upendra Yadav and Nepali Congress Vice-president Bimalendra Nidhi who have strong hold in this region from their respective parties.

This is a brief list of minister since 9 June 2021 since when PSP-N and Nepali Congress are two major parties in government.

== Current arrangement ==
S.N.	Portfolio	Holder	Portrait	Constituency	Party	Took office
Cabinet ministers
1	Chief Minister; Minister for Commerce, Supplies and Science Technology	Mohammad Lalbabu Raut		Parsa 1(B)	People's Socialist Party, Nepal	14 February 2018
2	Deputy Chief Minister; Minister for Physical Infrastructure Development	Ram Saroj Yadav		Dhanusha 3 (A)	Nepali Congress	9 June 2021
3	Minister for Industry, Forest and Environment	Satrudhan Mahato		Dhanusha 4(B)	CPN (Unified Socialist)	20 November 2021
4	Minister for Economic Affairs and Planning	Shailendra Prasad Sah		Saptari 2(A)	People's Socialist Party, Nepal	1 March 2018
5	Minister for Internal Affairs and Communication	Bharat Prasad Sah		Mahottari 1(B)	Communist Party of Nepal (Maoist Centre)	17 July 2021
6	Minister for Energy and Drinking Water	Om Prakash Sharma			Nepali Congress	9 June 2021
7	Minister for Land Management, Agriculture and Co-operatives	Bijay Kumar Yadav		Siraha 2 (A)	People's Socialist Party, Nepal	15 February 2018
8	Minister for Women, Children, Youth and Sports	Birendra Prasad Singh		Sarlahi 4(A)	Nepali Congress	9 June 2021
9	Minister for Social Development	Nawal Kishor Sah Sudi		Saptari 1(B)	People's Socialist Party, Nepal	1 March 2018
10	Minister for Law, Justice and Provincial Assembly Affairs	Pramod Kumar Yadav		Siraha 3(B)	CPN (Unified Socialist)	20 November 2021
State ministers
1	Minister of State for Industry, Tourism and Forest	Nagendra Raya Yadav		Rautahat 3(A)	CPN (Unified Socialist)	6 February 2021
2	State Minister for Economic Affairs and Planning	Usha Yadav			People's Socialist Party, Nepal	1 March 2018
3	State Minister for Internal Affairs and Law	Rubi Karn			Communist Party of Nepal (Maoist Centre)	1 March 2018
4	State Minister for Land Management, Agriculture and Co-operatives	Yogendra Ray Yadav		Rautahat 1(B)	People's Socialist Party, Nepal	1 March 2018

== Ministers by Party ==
=== Since 2021 ===
Representation of cabinet ministers by party
1. People's Socialist Party, Nepal (40%)
2. Nepali Congress (30%)
3. CPN (Unified Socialist) (20%)
4. CPN (Maoist Centre) (10%)

Party	Cabinet Ministers	Ministers of State	Total Ministers
People's Socialist Party, Nepal	4	2	6
Nepali Congress	3	0	3
CPN (Unified Socialist)	2	0	2
CPN (Maoist Centre)	1	1	2

=== Till 2021 ===
Representation of cabinet ministers by party
1. Samajbadi Party, Nepal (57%)
2. Rasytriya Janata Party, Nepal (43%)
3. 0.00%

Party	Cabinet Ministers	Ministers of State	Total Ministers
Samajbadi Party, Nepal	4	3	7
Rastriya Janata Party, Nepal	3	3	6

== Previous arrangements ==
=== Chief Minister & Cabinet Ministers ===
S.No.	Name	Constituency (PR if blank)	Portfolio	Took office	Left office	Political Party
1.	Mohammad Lalbabu Raut	Parsa 1(B)	Chief Minister Minister of Law, Justice and State Assembly Minister of Commerce, Supplies, Science and Technology	15 February 2018		People's Socialist Party, Nepal
2.	Jitendra Prasad Sonal	Bara 4(B)	Minister of Physical Infrastructure Development	15 February 2018	6 June 2021(expelled)	People's Socialist Party, Nepal
3.	Bijay Kumar Yadav	Siraha 2(A)	Minister of Finance	15 February 2018		People's Socialist Party, Nepal
4.	Gyanendra Kumar Yadav	Dhanusha 4(A)	Minister for Internal Affairs and Law	1 March 2018	17 July 2021 (Resigned)	People's Socialist Party, Nepal
5.	Shailendra Prasad Shah	Saptari 2(A)	Minister of Land Management, Agriculture and Cooperatives	1 March 2018		People's Socialist Party, Nepal
6.	Nawal Kishore Shah Sudi	Saptari 1(B)	Minister of Social Development	1 March 2018		People's Socialist Party, Nepal
7.	Ram Naresh Rae		Minister of Industry, Tourism and Forest	1 March 2018	16 November 2021 (expelled)	People's Socialist Party, Nepal

=== State Ministers ===
S.No.	Name	Constituency (PR if blank)	Portfolio	Took office	Left office	Political Party
1.	Usha Yadav		Minister of State for Economic Affairs and Planning	1 March 2018		People's Socialist Party, Nepal
2.	Yogendra Ray Yadav	Rautahat 1(B)	Minister of State for Land Management, Agriculture and Cooperatives	1 March 2018		People's Socialist Party, Nepal
3.	Saroj Kumar Singh	Mahottari 4(B)	Minister of State for Internal Affairs and Law	1 March 2018	17 July 2021(Resigned)	People's Socialist Party, Nepal
4.	Abhiram Sharma	Mahottari 3(A)	Minister of State for Social Development	25 July 2018	6 June 2021(expelled)	People's Socialist Party, Nepal
5.	Dimpal Kumari Jha		Minister of State for Physical Infrastructure Development	25 July 2018	6 June 2021(expelled)	People's Socialist Party, Nepal
6.	Suresh Kumar Mandal	Siraha 4(B)	Minister of State for Industry, Tourism and Environment	25 July 2018	6 June 2021(expelled)	People's Socialist Party, Nepal

== See also ==
- Lalbabu Raut
- Mahendra Narayan Nidhi Awas Yojana
- Krishna Chandra Nepali cabinet
- Kul Prasad KC cabinet
- Jeevan Bahadur Shahi cabinet
- Trilochan Bhatta cabinet
