= Pramod Kumar Mahato =

Nepalese politician

Honourable Pramod Kumar Mahato
- प्रमोदकुमार महतो
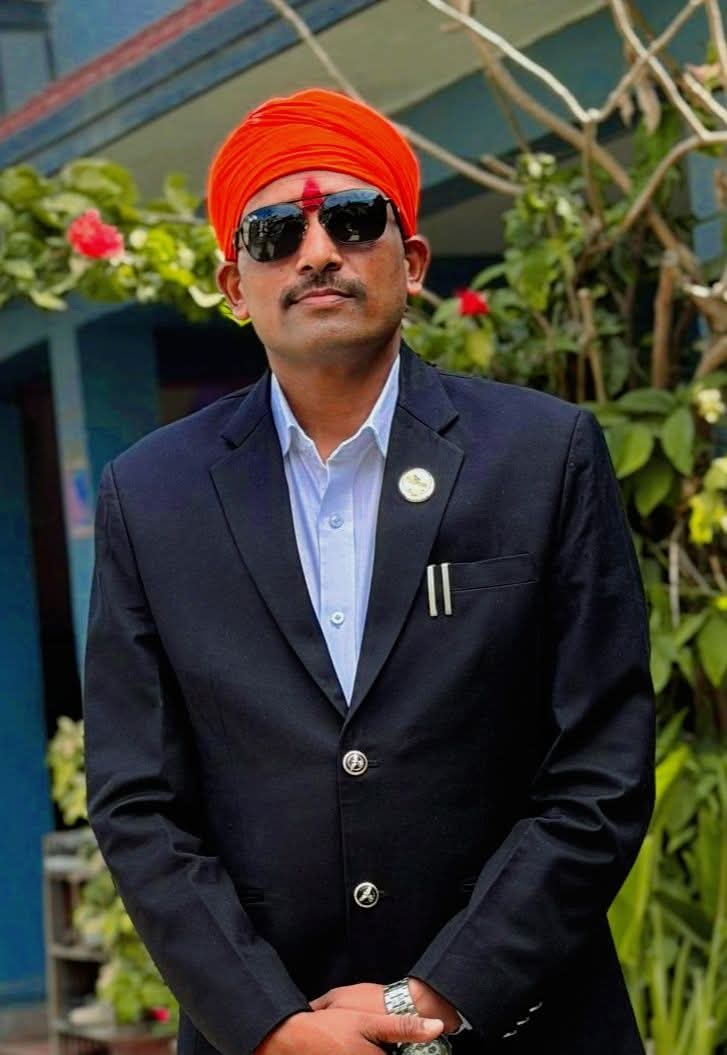

Member of Parliament, Pratinidhi Sabha
- Incumbent
- Assumed office 26 March 2026
- Preceded by: Laxmi Mahato Koiri
- Constituency: Mahottari 1

Personal details
- Born: 30 July 1985 (age 41) Gaushala, Mahottari District, Madhesh Province
- Party: Rastriya Swatantra Party
- Parent: Shiv Shankar Mahato (father)
- Occupation: Politician

Pramod Kumar Mahato (Nepali: प्रमोदकुमार महतो) is a Nepalese politician and currently a member of Pratinidhi Sabha from Rastriya Swatantra Party. He entered into politics in 2022 and contested in 2022 Nepal province election from Mahottari 1(B) as an Independent politician, but lost to Bharat Prasad Sah of CPN (Maoist Centre).

He joined the Rastriya Swatantra Party in 2026, He belongs to kushwaha(koiri) community of nepal and secured a party ticket to contest 2026 general election from Mahottari 1.

In the 2026 general election, he won from Mahottari 1 with 34,636 votes, defeating Laxmi Mahato Koiri seating MP of the Communist Party of Nepal (Unified Marxist–Leninist), and Giriraj Mani Pokharel, former minister of the Nepali Communist Party.

== Early life ==
Mahato was born in Gaushala, Mahottari District on 30 July 1985.

== Electoral performance ==
| Election | Year | Constituency | Contested for | Political party | Result | Votes | % of votes |
|---|---|---|---|---|---|---|---|
| Nepal province election | 2022 | Mahottari 1(B) | Pradesh Sabha member | Independent politician | Lost | 2,405 | 7.97% |
| Nepal general election | 2026 | Mahottari 1 | Pratinidhi Sabha member | Rastriya Swatantra Party | Won | 34,636 | 54.76% |
