= Krishna Kumar Shrestha =

Nepali politician

Honourable Krishna Kumar Shrestha
- कृष्ण कुमार श्रेष्ठ

Minister of Labour, Employment and Social Security
- In office 8 October 2021 – 27 June 2022
- President: Bidya Devi Bhandari
- Prime Minister: Sher Bahadur Deuba
- Preceded by: Bimal Prasad Shrivastav
- Succeeded by: Sher Bahadur Kunwor

Member of Parliament, Pratinidhi Sabha
- In office 4 March 2018 – September 2022
- Preceded by: Shankar Bhandari
- Succeeded by: Ram Chandra Paudel
- Constituency: Tanahun 1
- In office 22 December 2022 – 26 March 2026
- Preceded by: Ekbal Miya
- Succeeded by: Rahbar Ansari
- Constituency: Bara 4

Personal details
- Born: 22 December 1967 (age 58) Tanahun, Nepal
- Party: CPN (UML)
- Other political affiliations: CPN (Unified Socialist)
- Nickname: Kishan

Krishna Kumar Shrestha (Nepali: कृष्ण कुमार श्रेष्ठ) is a Nepali politician belonging to CPN (UML).

He most recently served for 8 months as Minister for Labour, Employment and Social Security of Nepal in the ruling coalition government led by Nepali Congress President Sher Bahadur Deuba. He was also a member of the House of Representatives of the federal parliament of Nepal.

== Early life ==
Shrestha was born on 22 December 1967, in Jamune-9 of Tanahun, to Kewal Bahadur and Les Kumari Shrestha. He has an education up to proficiency certificate level.

== Political career ==
Shrestha joined politics in 1985. As of 2013, he was an advisor to CPN UML, Tanahun.

He was a candidate for the CPN UML in Tanahun-2 constituency in the 2013 constituent assembly election but lost to senior leader of Nepali Congress, Ram Chandra Paudel.

He was elected from Tanahun-1 constituency in the 2017 legislative election under the first-past-the-post system, as a joint candidate of the left alliance. He defeated incumbent Ram Chandra Paudel by more than 6,000 votes. He received 34,492 votes to Paudel's 27,690.
