= Om Prakash Sharma (Nepali politician) =

Nepalese politician and Minister of Madhesh Province

Honourable Om Prakash Sharma
- ओम प्रकाश शर्मा
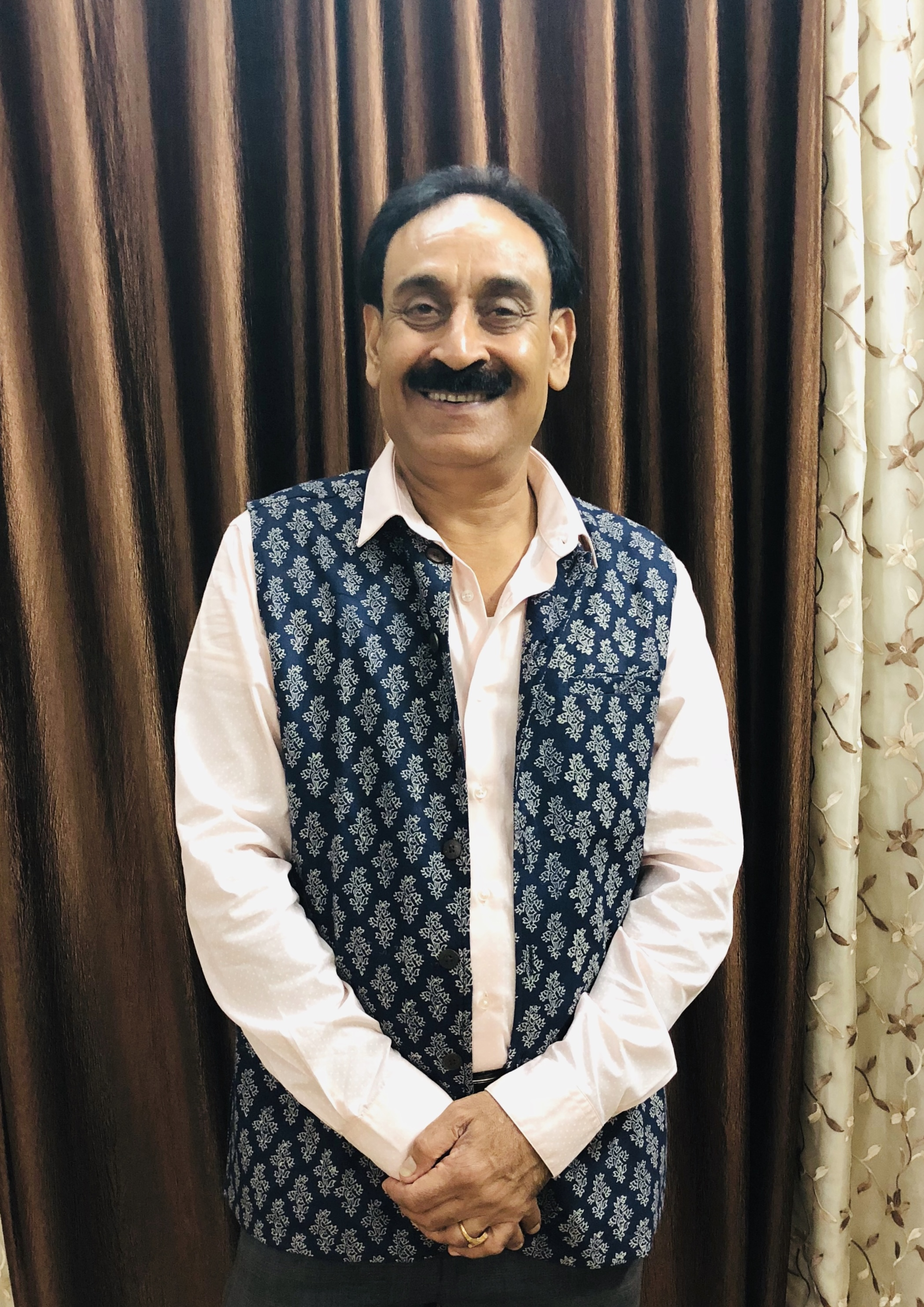

Minister for Water Supply and Energy Development of Madhesh Province
- In office 9 June 2021 – 14 October 2022
- Governor: Hari Shankar Mishra
- Chief minister: Lalbabu Raut
- Preceded by: Position created
- Succeeded by: Singhasan Sah Kalwar

Member of the Madhesh Provincial Assembly
- In office 2018–2022

Member of the Constituent Assembly
- In office 2009–2017

Personal details
- Born: Birgunj, Parsa, Nepal
- Party: Nepali Congress
- Website: p2.gov.np

Om Prakash Sharma (Nepali: ओम प्रकाश शर्मा) is a Nepali politician of Nepali Congress and Minister for Energy and Drinking water since 9 June 2021. He is also serving as member of the Madhesh Province Provincial Assembly.

Sharma, a resident of Parsa, was elected to the 2017 provincial assembly elections from proportional list of the party. He including 2 other ministers from Nepali Congress joined Lalbabu Raut ministry on 9 June 2021 after a group of PSP-N was expelled from ministry as a result of talks between the two parties specially PSP-N chairperson Upendra Yadav and NC Vice-president Bimalendra Nidhi.

== See also ==
- Nepali Congress, Madhesh Province
