= Deputy Chief Minister of Madhesh Province =

- मधेश प्रदेशका उपमुख्यमन्त्री
- Incumbent; Vacant since 14 October 2022
- Deputy Chief Minister's office (Madhesh Province)
- Style: The Honorable
- Status: Deputy Head of Government
- Abbreviation: DCM
- Member of: Provincial Assembly of Madhesh Province
- Seat: Janakpur, Nepal
- Nominator: Chief Minister of Madhesh Province
- Appointer: Governor of Madhesh Province
- Term length: At the confidence of the assembly 5 years and is subject to no term limits.
- Inaugural holder: Ram Saroj Yadav
- Formation: 9 June 2021 (5 years ago)

The deputy chief minister of Madhesh Province is the deputy head of the executive branch of the Government of Madhesh Province and the second highest ranking minister of the Council of Minister.

== List of deputy chief ministers ==
#	Portrait	Name Constituency	Term of office			Party	Chief Minister
1		Ram Saroj Yadav; MPA for Dhanusha 3(A)	9 June 2021	14 October 2022	1 year, 127 days	Nepali Congress	Lalbabu Raut

== See also ==
- Governor of Madhesh Province
- Chief Minister of Madhesh Province
