= Saroj Yadav cabinet =

Madhesh province cabinet

- 5th Cabinet of Madhesh Province
- Date formed: 9 November 2025
- Date dissolved: 3 December 2025

People and organisations
- Governor of Madhesh: Sumitra Bhandari
- Head of government: Saroj Kumar Yadav
- No. of ministers: 4
- Member parties: CPN (UML) Coalition partner; Nepal Federal Socialist Party; RPP
- Status in legislature: Largest Party 23 / 107 (21%) (November - December 2025)
- Opposition party: Congress; PSP-Nepal; Janamat; Maoist Centre; Unified Socialist

History
- Election: 2022
- Legislature term: 24 days
- Predecessor: Jitendra Prasad Sonal cabinet
- Successor: Krishna Prasad Yadav cabinet

The Saroj Yadav cabinet was the fifth provincial government headed by Saroj Kumar Yadav in Madhesh Province, Nepal. The cabinet was formed after Yadav was sworn in as the Chief Minister of Madhesh Province on 9 November 2025.

Yadav had staked a claim to the post of chief minister under Article 168(3) of the Constitution of Nepal.

He resigned from his position on December 3, 2025, after the Supreme Court of Nepal issued an order on December 1, 2025, requiring him to secure a vote of confidence within the following 24 hours.

This is a list of ministers and state ministers of the Yadav cabinet from November 2025 to December 2025.

== Councils of ministers ==
S.N.	Portfolio	Holder	Party	Constituency	Took office	Left office
Cabinet ministers
1	Chief Minister; All other ministries not allocated to anyone.	Saroj Kumar Yadav	CPN (UML)	Mahottari 4 (A)	9 November 2025	3 December 2025
-	Minister without portfolio	Lakhan Das Tatma	CPN (UML)	Dhanusha 2 (A)	9 November 2025	23 November 2025
-	Minister without portfolio	Bimala Ansari Tarannum	Nepal Federal Socialist Party	PR Muslim	9 November 2025	23 November 2025
-	Minister without portfolio	Kanchan Bichha	Rastriya Prajatantra Party	PR Madheshi	9 November 2025	23 November 2025
2	Minister for Energy, Irrigation and Water	Lakhan Das Tatma	CPN (UML)	Dhanusha 2 (A)	24 November 2025	3 December 2025
3	Minister for Home Affairs, Communication and Law	Bimala Ansari Tarannum	Nepal Federal Socialist Party	PR Muslim	24 November 2025	3 December 2025
4	Minister for Forest and Environment	Kanchan Bichha	Rastriya Prajatantra Party	PR Madheshi	24 November 2025	3 December 2025
