= Mahendra Narayan Nidhi Deprived Housing Scheme =

Nepali Housing Project

Mahendra Narayan Nidhi Vipanna Awas Yojana
- महेन्द्र नारायण निधि विपन्न आवास योजना
- Country: Nepal (Madhesh Province)
- Chief Minister: Lalbabu Raut
- Ministry: Ministry of Physical Infrastructure Development
- Key people: Ram Saroj Yadav (Minister)
- Launched: 14 January 2022; 4 years ago
- Funding: Nrs 500,000 per house to 610 household
- Status: Active
- Website: https://mopid.p2.gov.np/

Mahendra Narayan Nidhi Awas Yojana (lit. 'Mahendra Narayan Nidhi Deprived Housing Scheme') is an initiative by the Nepali Government of Madhesh Province in which affordable housing will be provided to the urban poor with a target of building 610 affordable houses by 31 March 2022.

As per the province government, two-roomed plastered and roofed house, a kitchen and a toilet would be constructed at a total cost of Rs.5 lakh per house. It is reported that the process of housing construction would be expedited.

== History ==
The government announced in the budget of financial year 2078/2079 that the province government would make 10 house in each provincial constituency within the province which was first of its kind in any province in Nepal. This was named on Rastra Gaurav Man Padavi recipient leader late Mahendra Narayan Nidhi, a democracy fighter and Gandhian leader from the province.

Mahendra Narayan Nidhi Deprived Housing Scheme, Implementation Procedure, 2078 and Dalit Empowerment Rules, 2078 was passed by the Cabinet on 13 January 2021.
