= Nagendra Prasad Sinha =

Nepalese politician

Honourable Nagendra Prasad Sinha
- नागेन्द्र प्रसाद सिन्हा
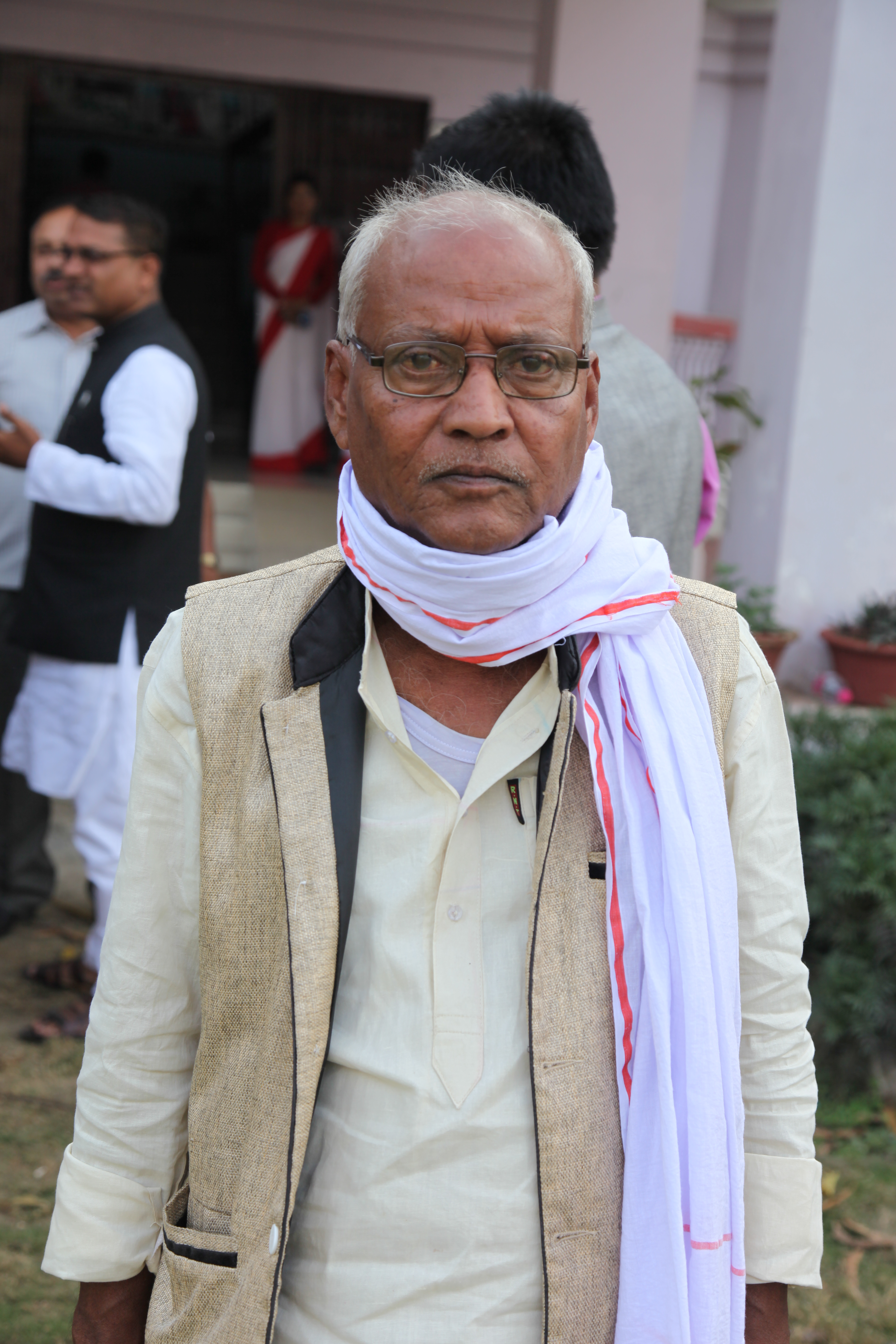
- Portrait of Sinha in 2019

Province Assembly Member of Madhesh Province
- Incumbent
- Assumed office 2017

Personal details
- Party: Nepali Congress
- Occupation: Politician

Nagendra Prasad Sinha (Nepali: नागेन्द्र प्रसाद सिन्हा) is a Nepalese politician who is an elected member of the Provincial Assembly of Madhesh Province from Nepali Congress. Sinha, a resident of Ishanath, Rautahat was elected to the 2017 provincial assembly election from Rautahat 2(A).

== Electoral history ==
=== 2017 Nepalese provincial elections ===
Party	Candidate	Votes
Nepali Congress	Nagendra Prasad Sinha	11,851
CPN (Unified Marxist–Leninist)	Shailendra Shah	7,761
Rastriya Janata Party Nepal	Dr. Ram Shankar Thakur	5,070
Others		1,488
Invalid votes		1,069
Result	Congress gain	
Source: Election Commission
