= Mohammad Aftab Alam =

Nepali politician (1962–2025)

Mohammed Aftab Alam
- मोहम्मद आफताब आलम

Member of Parliament, Pratinidhi Sabha
- In office 4 March 2018 – 13 October 2019
- Preceded by: Mohammad Mustaq Alam
- Constituency: Rautahat 2
- In office 1997 – May 2002
- Preceded by: Sheikh Idrish
- Constituency: Rautahat 2

Member of Constituent Assembly
- In office 28 May 2008 – 28 May 2012
- Succeeded by: Mohammad Mustaq Alam
- Constituency: Rautahat 2

Personal details
- Born: 19 June 1962 Rajpur, Rautahat, Nepal
- Died: 8 November 2025 (aged 63) Sinamangal, Kathmandu, Nepal
- Party: Nepali Congress
- Relatives: Sheikh Idrish (uncle)
- Profession: Politician

Mohammad Aftab Alam (Nepali: मोहम्मद अफताब आलम; 19 June 1962 – 8 November 2025) was a Nepali politician from the Nepali Congress and a suspended member of the House of Representatives of the federal parliament of Nepal. He was a member of the first constituent assembly as well. He was also a former Minister for Labour and Transport Management.

== Career ==
Alam was elected from Rautahat-2 to the Pratinidhi Sabha in the 1999 election and the 2008 Constituent Assembly election but was defeated in the 2013 election from the same constituency.

Alam was elected to parliament in the 2017 legislative election from Rautahat-2 constituency, as a candidate from Nepali Congress. He defeated his nearest rival Kiran Kumar Shah by acquiring 18,833 votes to Shah's 16,865. Following his election to parliament, he was appointed a member of the House Industry, Commerce, Labour and Consumer Interest Committee.

== Arrest ==
Alam was arrested from Rajapur municipality-1, Rautahat, on 13 October 2019 on charges of murder and causing an explosion over his alleged involvement in the 9 April 2008 bomb blast in Rautahat and the subsequent murders of the injured. According to a report by The Himalayan Times, it has been alleged that Alam had employed several people, tasked with making bombs to be used for capturing booths in the 2008 constituent assembly elections. When a bomb went off in a massive explosion that injured as many as 18 people, Alam allegedly dumped them at a brick kiln, killing them. República, however, reported that 14 people died in the blast while those and an additional eight injured were thrown in the furnace of the brick kiln, murdering the injured and destroying evidence. According to The Kathmandu Post, at least two victims had died in the initial explosion and as many as two dozen injured were dumped alive into the brick furnace.

He was suspended from his position in the House of Representatives following his arrest.

A single bench of Judge Deepak Dhakal, Rautahat District Court, denied him bail on 15 November 2019, after a preliminary hearing where Alam was allowed to make a statement. Alam's lawyers had argued that there was no such bomb explosion in Rautahat in 2008, that Alam was innocent, and was being framed by the government with a fake list of victims.

== Death ==
Alam died at the KMC Hospital in Sinamangal, on 8 November 2025, after having undergone treatment there for a month. He was 63.

== Personal life ==
Alam is a Muslim.
