= Rahbar Ansari =

Nepalese politician

Honourable Rahbar Ansari
- रहबर अन्सारी

Member of Parliament, Pratinidhi Sabha
- Incumbent
- Assumed office 26 March 2026
- Preceded by: Krishna Kumar Shrestha
- Constituency: Bara 4

Personal details
- Citizenship: Nepalese
- Party: Rastriya Swatantra Party
- Other political affiliations: CPN Maoist
- Education: Public Policy (MA)
- Alma mater: Central European University
- Profession: Politician

Rahbar Ansari (Nepali: रहबर अन्सारी) is a Nepalese politician serving as a member of parliament from the Rastriya Swatantra Party. He is the member of the 7th Pratinidhi Sabha elected from Bara 4 constituency in 2026 Nepalese General Election securing 41,200 votes and defeating his closest contender Krishna Kumar Shrestha of the CPN UML. On 16 April 2026, Ansari has been appointed as the chair of the Industry, Commerce and Labour and Consumer Welfare Committee after the RSP parliamentary meeting.

He was a former Madhesh Province provincial Assembly member from CPN (Maoist) party until 8 January 2026 before joining RSP. He holds MA in Public policy from Central European University, Austria.
