= Satish Kumar Singh =

Nepalese politician and former Chief Minister of Madhesh Province

- सतिश कुमार सिंह
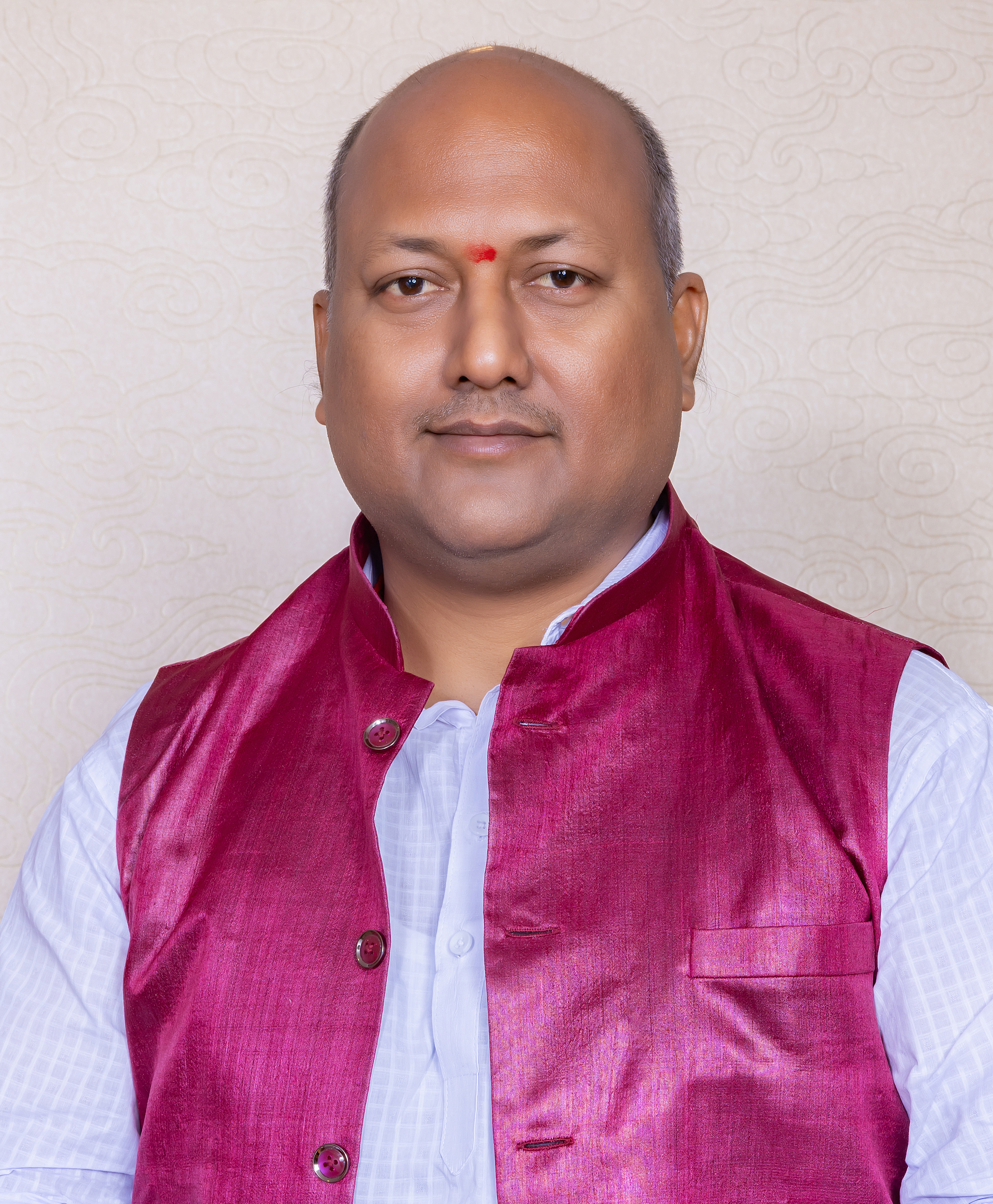
- Satish Kumar Singh in 2024

3rd Chief Minister of Madhesh Province
- In office 7 June 2024 – 15 October 2025
- President: Ram Chandra Poudel
- Governor: Sumitra Bhandari
- Preceded by: Saroj Kumar Yadav
- Succeeded by: Jitendra Prasad Sonal

Provincial Assembly of Madhesh Province
- In office 12 January 2023 – 19 January 2026
- Constituency: Saptari 2 (constituency)

Personal details
- Born: Tilathi Koiladi, Saptari, Nepal
- Party: Swabhiman Party (2025-present)
- Other political affiliations: Rastriya Janata Party Nepal (2017-2020); Loktantrik Samajwadi (2021-2022); Janamat Party (2022-2025)
- Spouse: Anu Singh
- Parents: Shekhar Kumar Singh (father); Usha Devi Singh (mother)
- Website: ocmcm.madhesh.gov.np

Satish Kumar Singh is a Nepalese politician who served as the 3rd Chief Minister of Madhesh Province from 7 June 2024 until his resignation on 14 October 2025.

He also resigned as a Member of Legislative Assembly from Madhesh Province on 19 January 2026 to contest 2026 Nepalese general election. Singh has served formerly as the Chairman of Tilathi Koiladi Rural Municipality from 2017 to 2022. In the 2022 Nepalese local elections, for the same post, he lost to Arun Kumar Mandal of Nepali Congress.

== Personal life ==
Singh was born in Tilathi Koiladi Rural Municipality, Saptari. He belongs to a Hindu family.

== Electoral performance ==
Election	Year	Local unit/Constituency	Political party	Result	Votes	% of votes	Source
Nepal local election	2017	Chairman of Tilathi Koiladi	Rastriya Janata Party Nepal	Won	2,987	30.33%	
Nepal local election	2022	Chairman of Tilathi Koiladi	Loktantrik Samajwadi Party	Lost	3,646	28.72%	
Nepal provincial election	2022	MPA of Saptari 2 (A)	Janamat Party	Won	16,734	50.42%	
Nepal general election	2026	MP of Saptari 2	Swabhiman Party	Lost	3,557	5.66%	

== See also ==
- Satish Kumar Singh cabinet

Political offices
Preceded by Saroj Kumar Yadav	Chief Minister of Madhesh Province; June 2024-October 2025	Succeeded by Jitendra Prasad Sonal
