= Ram Kishore Prasad Yadav =

Nepalese politician

- राम किशोर प्रसाद यादव

Province Assembly Member of Madhesh Province
- In office 2017–2022
- Preceded by: N/A
- Constituency: Rautahat 2 (constituency)

Personal details
- Born: June 1, 1966 (age 59)
- Party: People's Socialist Party, Nepal
- Occupation: Politician

Ram Kishore Prasad Yadav or Ram Kishor Prasad Yadav (Nepali: राम किशोर प्रसाद यादव) is a Nepalese politician. He is a former member of Provincial Assembly of Madhesh Province from People's Socialist Party, Nepal. Yadav, a resident of Baudhimai, was elected via 2017 Nepalese provincial elections from Rautahat 2(B).

== Electoral history ==
=== 2017 Nepalese provincial elections ===
Party	Candidate	Votes
Federal Socialist Forum, Nepal	Ram Kishore Prasad Yadav	9,522
CPN (Maoist Centre)	Manoj Kumar Yadav	7,966
Nepali Congress	Ram Chandra Giri	7,757
Others		1,351
Invalid votes		1,297
Result	FSFN gain	
Source: Election Commission
