= Jitendra Prasad Sonal =

Nepalese politician and former Chief Minister of Madhesh Province

Honourable Jitendra Prasad Sonal
- जितेन्द्र प्रसाद सोनल

4th Chief Minister of Madhesh Province
- In office 16 October 2025 – 9 November 2025
- President: Ram Chandra Poudel
- Governor: Sumitra Subedi Bhandari
- Preceded by: Satish Kumar Singh
- Succeeded by: Saroj Kumar Yadav
Ministerial positions
Minister for Physical Infrastructure Development of Madhesh Province
In office 15 February 2018 – 6 June 2021
Governor	Ratneshwar Lal Kayastha; Tilak Pariyar; Rajesh Jha
Preceded by	Position created
Succeeded by	Ram Saroj Yadav

Member of the Madhesh Provincial Assembly
- Incumbent
- Assumed office 21 January 2018
- Constituency: Bara 4 (B)

Personal details
- Born: November 30, 1969 (age 56) Lipanimal, Bara, Nepal
- Citizenship: Nepalese
- Party: Loktantrik Samajbadi Party, Nepal
- Other political affiliations: Madhesi Jana Adhikar Forum; Terai Madhesh Loktantrik Party; Rastriya Janata Party Nepal
- Children: 3
- Occupation: Politician

Jitendra Prasad Sonal (also known as "Jitendra Prasad Sonar") is a Nepalese politician, who served as the 4th Chief Minister of Madhesh Province from 16 October 2025 until his resignation on 9 November 2025. He is a parliamentary party leader for the Loktantrik Samajwadi Party, Nepal in the Madhesh Provincial Assembly.

== Political life ==
Sonal, a resident of Bara, was elected to the 2017 and 2022 provincial assembly elections from Bara 4 (B) consecutively. He was the Physical Infrastructure Minister for Madhesh Province in Lalbabu Raut ministry.

== Electoral history ==
=== 2017 Nepalese provincial elections ===
Party	Candidate	Votes
Rastriya Janata Party Nepal	Jitendra Prasad Sonar	13,118
CPN (Maoist Centre)	Umesh Kumar Kushwaha	5,692
Nepali Congress	Bijay Prakash Sah Rauniyar	5,133
Independent	Suresh Prasad	3,962
Rastriya Prajatantra Party (Democratic)	Ananda Prakash Yadav	1,231
Others		1,774
Invalid votes		1,658
Result	RJPN gain	
Source: Election Commission

== See also ==
- Jitendra Prasad Sonal cabinet
- Loktantrik Samajwadi Party, Nepal
