= Ekbal Miya =

Nepali politician

Honourable Ekbal Miya
- एकवाल मियाँ

Minister of Youth and Sports
- In office 4 June 2021 – 22 June 2021
- President: Bidya Devi Bhandari
- Prime Minister: KP Oli
- Preceded by: Dawa Lama Tamang

Member of Parliament, Pratinidhi Sabha
- Incumbent
- Assumed office 4 March 2018
- Preceded by: Nezma Khatun
- Constituency: Bara 4

Personal details
- Born: 28 May 1969 (age 56) Bara District
- Party: Loktantrik Samajwadi (since 2021)
- Other political affiliations: CPN (UML) (until 2014); TMLP (2014–17); RJPN (2017–20); PSP-N (2020–21)
- Spouse: Salma Khatun
- Children: 1
- Parents: Sahabadin Miya (father); Navinesha Khatun (mother)

Ekbal Miya (Nepali: एकवाल मियाँ) is a Nepalese politician and a former Minister of Youth and Sports of Government of Nepal from 4 June 2021 until his removal from the post by the Supreme Court on 22 June 2021. He started his political life in 2043 BS from ANNFSU but in 2073 BS he joined the then Terai Madhes Loktantrik Party, became a central committee member of Rastriya Janata Party Nepal and is currently a People's Socialist Party, Nepal leader.

He was elected as a member of the House of Representatives from Bara 4 (constituency) in 2017 Nepalese general election.

== See also ==
- Oli cabinet, 2018
- Ministry of Youth and Sports (Nepal)
- Bara 4 (constituency)
