= Sheikh Idrish =

Nepalese politician

Sheikh Idrees
- शेख इद्रिस

Minister for Labor and Social Welfare (Nepal) and Minister for Forest and Soil Conservation
- In office 1990–1994
- Monarch: Birendra of Nepal
- Prime Minister: Girija Prasad Koirala
- Constituency: Rautaht -2

Member of House of Representatives
- In office 1991–1997
- Monarch: Birendra of Nepal
- Preceded by: Constituency created
- Succeeded by: Mohammad Aftab Alam
- Constituency: Rautahat 2

Personal details
- Born: Rajpur, Rautahat, Nepal
- Died: 28 November 1996 Rajpur, Rautaht Nepal
- Party: Nepali Congress
- Relations: Mohammed Aftab Aalam (Nephew)
- Profession: Politician

Sheikh Idress (Nepali: शेख इद्रिस) was a Nepalese politician who served as a Minister of labour and social welfare and minister of forest and soil conservation. He served as minister of Nepali Congress cabinet in 1990. He was awarded with Mahaujjwal Rastradeep Man Padavi in September 2018 by president of Nepal Bidhya Devi Bhandari.
