= Saroj Kumar Yadav (Mahottari politician) =

Nepalese politician and former Chief Minister of Madhesh Province

- सरोज कुमार यादव

5th Chief Minister of Madhesh Province
- In office 10 November 2025 – 3 December 2025
- President: Ram Chandra Poudel
- Governor: Sumitra Bhandari
- Preceded by: Jitendra Prasad Sonal
- Succeeded by: Krishna Prasad Yadav

Provincial Assembly of Madhesh Province
- Incumbent
- Assumed office 12 January 2023
- Constituency: Mahottari Provincial Assembly 4(A)

Personal details
- Born: July 21, 1978 (age 47) Ramgopalpur, Mahottari, Nepal
- Party: CPN (Unified Marxist–Leninist)
- Parent: Raj Kishor Yadav (father)

Saroj Kumar Yadav (Nepali: सरोज कुमार यादव) is a Nepalese politician who served as the 5th Chief Minister of Madhesh Province from 10 November 2025 until his resignation on 3 December 2025. Yadav is also the parliamentary party leader for the CPN (Unified Marxist–Leninist) in the Provincial Assembly and a former Minister for Physical Infrastructure Development of Madhesh Province.

Yadav, a resident of Ramgopalpur, was elected to the 2022 Nepalese provincial elections from Mahottari Provincial Assembly 4(A).

== See also ==
- Saroj Yadav cabinet

Political offices
Preceded by Jitendra Prasad Sonal	Chief Minister of Madhesh Province; June 2024-October 2025	Succeeded by Krishna Prasad Yadav
