= Kanish Patel =

Nepalese politician

Honourable Kanish Patel
- कनिश पटेल

Minister Of Industry, Commerce and Tourism of Madhesh Province Government, Province Assembly Member of Madhesh Province
- Incumbent
- Assumed office 2022
- Preceded by: N/A
- Constituency: Rautahat 2 (constituency)

Personal details
- Party: CPN (Unified Socialist)
- Occupation: Politician

Kanish Patel (Nepali: कनिश पटेल) is a Nepalese politician. He is a member of Provincial Assembly of Madhesh Province from CPN (Unified Socialist). Patel was elected via 2022 Nepalese provincial elections from Rautahat 2(B).
