= Chief Minister of Madhesh Province =

Head of Madhesh Province government

- मधेश प्रदेशका मुख्यमन्त्री
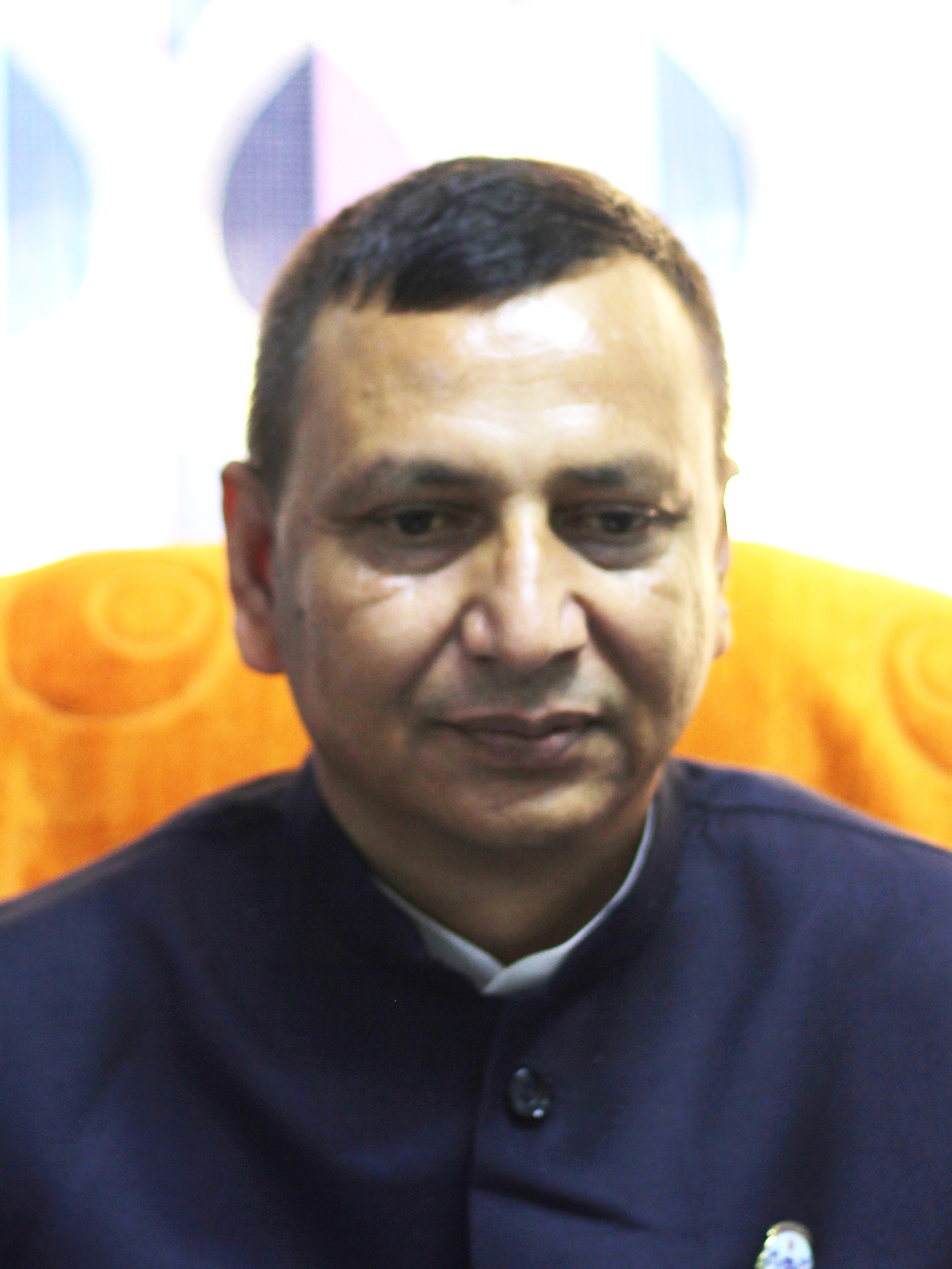
- Incumbent; Saroj Kumar Yadav since 22 November 2026
- Government of Madhesh Province
- Style: Honorable; Mr. Chief Minister
- Status: Head of Government
- Abbreviation: CMO
- Member of: Provincial Assembly; Cabinet
- Appointer: Governor
- Term length: Until majority confidence retained in provincial assembly Assembly term is 5 years unless dissolved earlier; No term limits
- Formation: 2018 (8 years ago)
- First holder: Lalbabu Raut
- Salary: रु. - 61,000
- Website: Official website

The Chief Minister of the Madhesh Province is the head of government of Madhesh Province. The chief minister is appointed by the governor of the province according to Article 167 of the Constitution of Nepal. The chief minister remains in office for five years or until the provincial assembly is dissolved, and is subject to no term limits, given that they have the confidence of the assembly.

The 7th chief minister Saroj Kumar Yadav of the People's Socialist Party, Nepal took the oath on November 22, 2026. The 6th chief minister Krishna Prasad Yadav served from December 5, 2025 to November 14, 2026.

== Qualification ==
The Constitution of Nepal sets the qualifications required to become eligible for the office of chief minister. A chief minister must meet the qualifications to become a member of the provincial assembly.

A member of the provincial assembly must be:

- a citizen of Nepal
- a voter of the concerned province
- of 25 years of age or more
- not convicted of any criminal offense
- not disqualified by any law
- not holding any office of profit

In addition, the chief minister must be the parliamentary party leader of the party with a majority of seats in the provincial assembly. If no party has a majority, the chief minister must have a majority in the assembly with the support of other parties. If within thirty days of the election, a chief minister is not appointed as such, or fails to obtain a vote of confidence from the assembly, the parliamentary party leader of the party with the most seats in the assembly is appointed chief minister. If the chief minister so appointed fails to obtain a vote of confidence in the assembly, any assembly member who can command a majority on the floor, irrespective of party allegiance, is appointed chief minister. If this chief minister also fails to obtain a vote of confidence, the governor dissolves the assembly and fresh elections are called.

== List of chief ministers of Madhesh Province ==
No.	Portrait	Name Constituency (Lifespan)	Term of office			Assembly Mandate	Party	Cabinet	Ref.
No.	Portrait	Name Constituency (Lifespan)	Assumed office	Left office	Time in office	Assembly Mandate	Party	Cabinet	Ref.
1		Lalbabu Raut; MPA for Parsa 1 (B) (born 1966)	14 February 2018	13 January 2023	4 years, 333 days	1st (2017)	Federal Socialist Forum	Raut	
1		Lalbabu Raut; MPA for Parsa 1 (B) (born 1966)	14 February 2018	13 January 2023	4 years, 333 days	1st (2017)	Samajbadi Party	Raut	
1		Lalbabu Raut; MPA for Parsa 1 (B) (born 1966)	14 February 2018	13 January 2023	4 years, 333 days	1st (2017)	People's Socialist Party, Nepal	Raut	
2		Saroj Kumar Yadav; MPA for Bara 1 (B) (born 1972)	13 January 2023	7 June 2024	1 year, 146 days	2nd (2022)	People's Socialist Party, Nepal	Yadav	
3		Satish Kumar Singh; MPA for Saptari 2 (A) (born 1982)	7 June 2024	15 October 2025	1 year, 130 days	2nd (2022)	Janamat Party	Singh	
4		Jitendra Prasad Sonal; MPA for Bara 4 (B) (born 1969)	15 October 2025	9 November 2025	24 days	2nd (2022)	Loktantrik Samajwadi Party	Sonal	
5		Saroj Kumar Yadav; MPA for Mahottari 4(A) (born 1978)	9 November 2025	4 December 2025	24 days	2nd (2022)	CPN UML	Saroj Yadav	
6		Krishna Prasad Yadav; MPA for Rautahat 1(B) (born 1967)	4 December 2025	14 November 2026	345 days	2nd (2022)	Nepali Congress	KP Yadav	.
7		Saroj Kumar Yadav; MPA for Bara 1(B) (born 1972)	22 November 2026		0 days	2nd (2022)	People's Socialist Party, Nepal	Second Saroj Yadav	
