= Laxmi Mahato Koiri =

Nepali politician

- लक्ष्मी महतो काेइरी

Member of Parliament, Pratinidhi Sabha
- In office 26 December 2022 – 2 May 2023
- Preceded by: Giriraj Mani Pokharel
- Constituency: Mahottari 1

Personal details
- Born: 20 May 1964 (age 61) Mahottari District
- Party: CPN (UML)

Laxmi Mahato Koiri (Nepali: लक्ष्मी महतो काेइरी) is a Nepalese politician, belonging to the CPN (UML). He served as a member of the 2nd Federal Parliament of Nepal beginning on 26 December 2022 after winning the election from the Mahottari 1 constituency.

On 2 May 2023, he was suspended from Parliament after being accused of murder. He was acquitted on 14 December 2023, and his suspension was lifted.
