= Ishanath, Rautahat =

Ishnath ईशनाथ
- Municipality
- Location in Nepal
- Coordinates: 26.78°N 85.21°E
- Country: Nepal
- Development Region: Central
- District: Rautahat
- Province: Province No. 2
- Established: 2016 A.D. (2073 B.S.)

Government
  - Mayor: Kaushalya देवी (लो.स.पा)
  - Deputy Mayor: MD. Parvez (लो.स.पा)

Area
  - Total: 35.17 km^{2} (13.58 sq mi)

Population (2011)
  - Total: 41,435
  - Density: 1,178/km^{2} (3,051/sq mi)
  - Religions: Sanatan Dharma Musalmaan

Languages
  - Local: Maithili, Tharu, Nepali, Bajjika
- Time zone: UTC+5:45 (NST)
- Postal Code: 44500
- Area code: 055
- Website: www.ishnathmun.gov.np

Ishnath (Nepali: ईशनाथ) is a municipality in Rautahat District, a part of Madhesh Province in Nepal. It was formed in 2016 occupying current 9 sections (wards) from previous 9 former VDCs. It occupies an area of 35.17 km^{2} with a total population of 41,435.
