= Sumitra Bhandari =

Nepalese politician

Honorable Sumitra Subedi Bhandari
- सुमित्रा सुवेदी भण्डारी

5th Governor of Madhesh Province
- In office 15 March 2024 – 11 November 2025
- President: Ram Chandra Poudel
- Prime Minister: Sushila Karki; Khadga Prasad Sharma Oli
- Chief Minister: Saroj Kumar Yadav; Satish Kumar Singh; Jitendra Prasad Sonal; Saroj Kumar Yadav
- Preceded by: Hari Shankar Mishra
- Succeeded by: Surendra Labh Karna

Personal details
- Other political affiliations: Communist Party of Nepal (Unified Marxist–Leninist)

Sumitra Subedi Bhandari (Nepali: सुमित्रा सुवेदी भण्डारी) is a Nepali politician and former Governor of Madhesh Province. Bhandari lost her post after being alleged for unsuccessfully controlling the government formation process in province.

A disputed Governor, Bhandari was appointed as per the Article 163 (2) of the Constitution of Nepal by the President on the recommendation of the Council of Ministers of the Government of Nepal on 15 March 2024. Following her disruptive move to appoint Saroj Kumar Yadav of her parent party, CPN (UML) as chief minister spread agitations throughout Madhesh Province seeking her removal from ceremonial post. However, majority of Members of Provincial Assembly (MPAs), as much as 74 of 107, filed a writ claiming it unconstitutional.
