= Nezma Khatun =

Nepali politician

Personal details
- Party: Communist Party of Nepal (Unified Marxist–Leninist)

Nezma Khatun (Nepali: निजमा खातुन) is a member of 2nd Nepalese Constituent Assembly. She won Bara–4 seat in CA assembly, 2013 from Communist Party of Nepal (Unified Marxist–Leninist).
