= Saroj Kumar Yadav =

Nepalese politician

- सरोज कुमार यादव
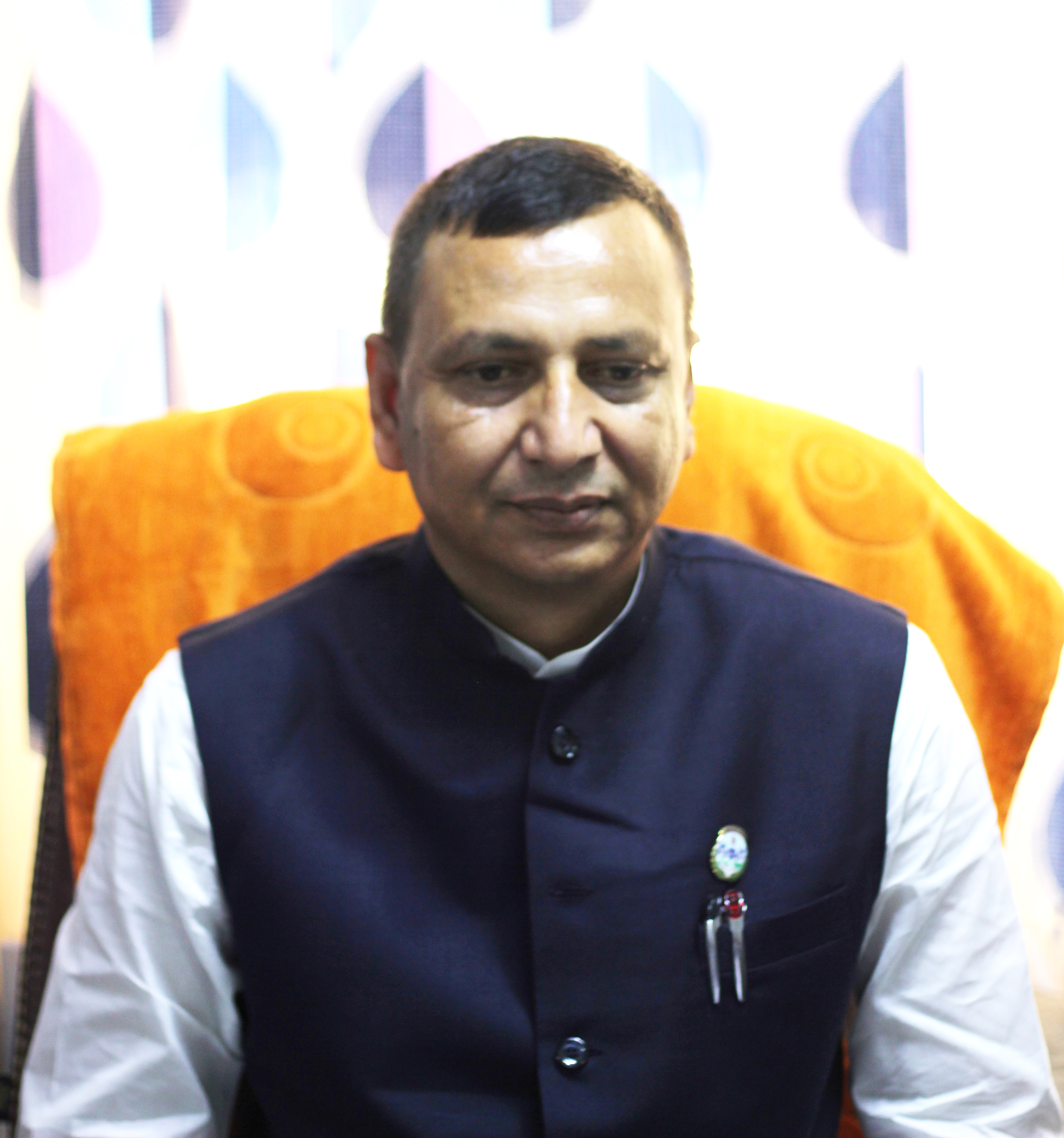

7th Chief Minister of Madhesh Province
- Incumbent
- Assumed office 22 November 2026
- President: Ram Chandra Poudel
- Governor: Surendra Labh Karna
- Preceded by: Krishna Prasad Yadav

2nd Chief Minister of Madhesh Province
- In office 12 January 2023 – 7 June 2024
- President: Bidya Devi Bhandari; Ram Chandra Poudel
- Governor: Hari Shankar Mishra
- Preceded by: Lalbabu Raut
- Succeeded by: Satish Kumar Singh

1st Speaker of the Madhesh Provincial Assembly
- In office 13 February 2018 – 18 September 2022
- Governor: Ratneshwar Lal Kayastha; Tilak Pariyar; Rajesh Jha; Hari Shankar Mishra
- Deputy: Upama Kumari Dev
- Preceded by: Post created

Member of the Madhesh Provincial Assembly
- Incumbent
- Assumed office 2 January 2023
- Constituency: Bara 1 (B)
- In office January 2018 – September 2022
- Preceded by: Post created
- Constituency: Bara 1 (B)

Member of the Constituent Assembly
- In office 28 May 2008 – 28 May 2012
- Preceded by: Umakant Chaudhary (as Member of Parliament)
- Succeeded by: Ram Ayodhya Prasad Yadav
- Constituency: Bara 1

Personal details
- Born: January 31, 1972 (age 54) Simraungadh, Bara, Nepal
- Party: People's Socialist Party, Nepal
- Other political affiliations: Rastriya Janata Party Nepal
- Occupation: Politician

Saroj Kumar Yadav (or Saroj Yadav; Nepali: सरोज कुमार यादव) is a Nepalese politician serving as the 7th chief minister of the Madhesh Province from November 22, 2026. He is a member of the People's Socialist Party, Nepal and member of provincial assembly from Bara 1(B) since 2018. He was also the 2nd chief minister of Madhesh and 1st Speaker of the Madhesh Provincial Assembly.

== Personal life ==
Yadav was born in Simraungadh, Bara. He did his high school degree, an academic diploma in Science from Bihar University, India.

== See also ==
- Saroj Kumar Yadav cabinet
- Kamal Bahadur Shah

Political offices
Preceded by Constitution created	Speaker of the Madhesh Provincial Assembly; 2018-2022	Succeeded by Ram Chandra Mandal
Preceded by Lalbabu Raut	Chief Minister of Madhesh Province; January 2023-June 2024	Succeeded by Satish Kumar Singh
