= Bharat Prasad Sah =

Nepalese politician

Honourable Bharat Prasad Sah
- भरत प्रसाद साह

Minister for Internal Affairs and Communication of Madhesh Province
- Incumbent
- Assumed office 17 July 2021
- Governor: Hari Shankar Mishra
- Chief minister: Lalbabu Raut
- Preceded by: Constitution created

Province Assembly Member of Madhesh Province
- Incumbent
- Assumed office 2017
- Preceded by: N/A
- Constituency: Mahottari 1 (constituency)

Personal details
- Born: December 19, 1972 (age 53)
- Party: CPN (Maoist Centre)
- Occupation: Politician

Bharat Prasad Sah (Nepali: भरत प्रसाद साह) is a Nepalese politician. He is a member of Provincial Assembly of Madhesh Province from CPN (Maoist Centre). Sah, a resident of Gaushala, Mahottari, was elected via 2017 Nepalese provincial elections from Mahottari 1(B).

== Electoral history ==
=== 2017 Nepalese provincial elections ===
Party	Candidate	Votes
Communist Party of Nepal (Maoist Centre)	Bharat Prasad Sah	10,093
Federal Socialist Forum, Nepal	Binod Kumar Mahato	9,669
Nepali Congress	Ram Shrestha Mahato	5,405
Others		543
Invalid votes		1,278
Result	Maoist Centre gain	
Source: Election Commission
