= Krishna Prasad Yadav (Nepali politician) =

Chief Minister of Madhesh Province of Nepal

- कृष्ण प्रसाद यादव

Chief Minister of Madhesh Province
- In office 7 December 2025 – 14 November 2026
- President: Ram Chandra Paudel
- Governor: Surendra Labh Karna
- Preceded by: Saroj Kumar Yadav

Minister for Physical Infrastructure of Madhesh Province
- In office 2023–2024
- Preceded by: Saroj Kumar Yadav
- Succeeded by: Saroj Kumar Yadav

Member of the Madhesh Provincial Assembly
- Incumbent
- Assumed office 2022
- Preceded by: Yogendra Rae Yadav
- Constituency: Rautahat 1 (B)

Personal details
- Born: Rautahat, Nepal
- Citizenship: Nepalese
- Party: Nepali Congress

Krishna Prasad Yadav is a Nepalese politician and member of Provincial Assembly and 6th chief minister of Madhesh Province. Yadav is also the parliamentary party leader for the Nepali Congress in the Provincial Assembly and a former Minister for Physical Infrastructure Development of Madhesh Province. Yadav is also the chairman of Madhesh Province committee of Nepali Congress.

Yadav, a resident of Rautahat, was elected in 2022 provincial assembly elections from Rautahat 1 (B). Yadav was supported by seven party alliance with the signature of 75 MLAs who filed case against the appointment of CPN (UML)'s Saroj Kumar Yadav.

== 2022 Nepalese provincial elections ==
Rautahat 1(B)
Party	Candidate	Votes
Nepali Congress	Krishna Prasad Yadav	12,489
Independent	Rajesh Kumar Chaudhary	11,400
Result	Congress gain	
Source: Election Commission

== See also ==
- Nepali Congress
- Bimalendra Nidhi
