= Bara 4 =

Parliamentary constituency in Madhesh Province, Nepal

- Parliamentary constituency
- Bara 4 in Province No. 2
- Province: Province No. 2
- District: Bara District

Current constituency
- Created: 1991
- Party: Rastriya Swatantra Party
- Member of Parliament: Rahbar Ansari
- Madesh Provincial Assembly Member 4 क: Devnarayan Tharu
- Madesh Provincial Assembly Member 4ख: Jitendra Prasad Sonar

Bara 4 is one of four parliamentary constituencies of Bara District in Nepal. This constituency came into existence on the Constituency Delimitation Commission (CDC) report submitted on 31 August 2017.

== Incorporated areas ==
Bara 4 incorporates Parwanipur Rural Municipality, Prasauni Rural Municipality, Bishrampur Rural Municipality, ward 17 of Kalaiya Sub-metropolitan City, wards 1–4 of Pheta Rural Municipality, and wards 1–10 and 19–24 of Jitpur Simara Sub-metropolitan City.

== Assembly segments ==
It encompasses the following Province No. 2 Provincial Assembly segment

- Bara 4(A)
- Bara 4(B)

== Members of Parliament ==
=== Parliament/Constituent Assembly ===
Election	Member	Party
1991	Salim Miya Ansari	CPN (Unified Marxist–Leninist)
March 1998	Salim Miya Ansari	CPN (Marxist–Leninist)
1999	Farmullah Mansoor	Nepali Congress
2008	Jitendra Prasad Sonar	Terai Madhes Loktantrik Party
2013	Nazma Khatun	CPN (Unified Marxist–Leninist)
2017	Ekbal Miya	Rastriya Janata Party Nepal
April 2020	Ekbal Miya	People's Socialist Party, Nepal
August 2021	Ekbal Miya	Loktantrik Samajwadi Party, Nepal
2022	Krishna Kumar Shrestha	CPN (Unified Socialist)
2026	Rahbar Ansari	Rastriya Swatantra Party

=== Provincial Assembly ===
==== 4(A) ====
Election	Member	Party
2017	Sundar Bahadur Bishwakarma	CPN (Unified Marxist–Leninist)
May 2018	Sundar Bahadur Bishwakarma	Nepal Communist Party
March 2021	Sundar Bahadur Bishwakarma	CPN (Unified Marxist–Leninist)
August 2021	Sundar Bahadur Bishwakarma	CPN (Unified Socialist)

==== 4(B) ====
Election	Member	Party
2017	Jitendra Prasad Sonar	Rastriya Janata Party Nepal
April 2020	Jitendra Prasad Sonar	People's Socialist Party, Nepal
August 2021	Jitendra Prasad Sonar	Loktantrik Samajwadi Party, Nepal

== Election results ==
=== Election in the 2020s ===
==== 2022 general election ====
Candidate	Party	Votes	%
Krishna Kumar Shrestha	CPN (Unified Socialist)	30,341	43.80
Ekbal Miya	CPN (UML)	20,336	29.36
Ichchha Bahadur Wagle	Independent	5,542	8.00
Pavan Chaudhary	Rastriya Swatantra Party	3,884	5.61
Jalil Dewan	Rastriya Prajatantra Party	3,205	4.63
Hari Prasad Kurmi	Janamat Party	2,211	3.19
Sunil Prasad Sah Kalwar	Bibeksheel Sajha Party	1,549	2.24
Santosh Kumar Gupta	Hamro Nepali Party	1,042	1.50
Others		1,156	1.67
Total		69,266	100.00
Majority		10,005	
CPN (Unified Socialist) gain			

=== Election in the 2010s ===
==== 2017 legislative elections ====
Party	Candidate	Votes
Rastriya Janata Party Nepal	Ekbal Miya	22,275
CPN (Maoist Centre)	Dev Narayan Tharu	20,607
Nepali Congress	Lal Babu Singh Bhuihar	14,516
Others		2,735
Invalid votes		3,246
Result	RJPN gain	
Source: Election Commission

==== 2017 Nepalese provincial elections ====
===== 4(A) =====
Party	Candidate	Votes
CPN (Unified Marxist–Leninist)	Sundar Bahadur Bishwakarma	11,770
Nepali Congress	Om Krishna Karki	8,323
Rastriya Janata Party Nepal	Ghanashyam Giri	7,386
Others		1,927
Invalid votes		1,224
Result	CPN (UML) gain	
Source: Election Commission

===== 4(B) =====
Party	Candidate	Votes
Rastriya Janata Party Nepal	Jitendra Prasad Sonar	13,118
CPN (Maoist Centre)	Umesh Kumar Kushwaha	5,692
Nepali Congress	Bijay Prakash Sah Rauniyar	5,133
Independent	Suresh Prasad	3,962
Rastriya Prajatantra Party (Democratic)	Ananda Prakash Yadav	1,231
Others		1,774
Invalid votes		1,658
Result	RJPN gain	
Source: Election Commission

==== 2013 Constituent Assembly election ====
Party	Candidate	Votes
CPN (Unified Marxist–Leninist)	Nazma Khatun	12,361
Nepali Congress	Sunil Kumar Gupta Kalwar	7,396
Terai Madhes Loktantrik Party	Jitendra Prasad Sonar	6,199
UCPN (Maoist)	Suresh Prasad	3,442
Terai Madesh Sadbhavana Party Nepal	Jaya Prakash Yadav	2,131
Rastriya Prajatantra Party Nepal	Brijlal Prasad Yadav	1,969
Sadbhavana Party	Yogendra Prasad Dhanuk	1,396
Rastriya Prajatantra Party	Chiranjibi Bhakta Paudel	1,112
Others		4,450
Result	CPN (UML) gain	
Source: NepalNews

=== Election in the 2000s ===
==== 2008 Constituent Assembly election ====
Party	Candidate	Votes
Terai Madhes Loktantrik Party	Jitendra Prasad Sonar	9,624
CPN (Unified Marxist–Leninist)	Mahmood Aalam	8,453
Nepali Congress	Farmullah Mansoor	8,353
CPN (Maoist)	Sonalal Sah Teli	5,179
Rastriya Janata Dal	Yunush Ansari	3,000
Madhesi Jana Adhikar Forum, Nepal	Mohammad Sani Thakurai	2,985
Others		5,038
Invalid votes		3,329
Result	TMLP gain	
Source: Election Commission

=== Election in the 1990s ===
==== 1999 legislative elections ====
Party	Candidate	Votes
Nepali Congress	Farmullah Mansoor	24,409
CPN (Unified Marxist–Leninist)	Mahmood Aalam	16,927
CPN (Marxist–Leninist)	Salim Miya Ansari	8,269
Rastriya Prajatantra Party	Brijlal Prasad Bhagat	7,211
Nepal Sadbhawana Party	Bharat Prasad Kalwar	2,132
Others		1,389
Invalid Votes		1,317
Result	Congress gain	
Source: Election Commission

==== 1994 legislative elections ====
Party	Candidate	Votes
CPN (Unified Marxist–Leninist)	Salim Miya Ansari	20,148
Nepali Congress	Farmullah Mansoor	16,848
Rastriya Prajatantra Party	Mohan Prasad Nepali	6,318
Nepal Sadbhawana Party	Amrita Devi Agrahari	3,529
Independent	Yogendra Dhanuk	1,668
Others		1,806
Result	CPN (UML) hold	
Source: Election Commission

==== 1991 legislative elections ====
Party	Candidate	Votes
CPN (Unified Marxist–Leninist)	Salim Miya Ansari	20,547
Nepali Congress	Farmullah Mansoor	16,036
Result	CPN (UML) gain	

== See also ==
- List of parliamentary constituencies of Nepal
