= Mahottari 1 =

Parliamentary constituency in Madhesh Province, Nepal

- Parliamentary constituency
- Mahottari 1 in Province No. 2
- Province: Province No. 2
- District: Mahottari District

Current constituency
- Created: 1991
- Party: Rastriya Swatantra Party
- Member of Parliament: Pramod Kumar Mahato

Mahottari 1 is one of four parliamentary constituencies of Mahottari District in Nepal. This constituency came into existence on the Constituency Delimitation Commission (CDC) report submitted on 31 August 2017.

== Incorporated areas ==
Mahottari 1 incorporates Bardibas Municipality, Gaushala Municipality and wards 3–5 and 9 of Bhangaha Municipality.

== Assembly segments ==
It encompasses the following Province No. 2 Provincial Assembly segment

- Mahottari 1(A)
- Mahottari 1(B)

== Members of Parliament ==
=== Parliament or Constituent Assembly ===
Election	Member	Party
1991	Mahendra Yadav	Nepali Congress
2008	Giriraj Mani Pokharel	Janamorcha Nepal
January 2009	Giriraj Mani Pokharel	UCPN (Maoist)
May 2016	Giriraj Mani Pokharel	CPN (Maoist Centre)
May 2018	Giriraj Mani Pokharel	Nepal Communist Party
March 2021	Giriraj Mani Pokharel	CPN (Maoist Centre)
2022	Laxmi Mahato Koiri (suspended in 2023)	CPN (UML)
2026	Pramod Kumar Mahato	Rastriya Swatantra Party

=== Provincial Assembly ===
==== 1(A ====
Election	Member	Party
2017	Sharada Devi Thapa	CPN (Unified Marxist-Leninist)
May 2018	Sharada Devi Thapa	Nepal Communist Party

==== 1(B) ====
Election	Member	Party
2017	Bharat Prasad Sah	CPN (Maoist Centre)
May 2018	Bharat Prasad Sah	Nepal Communist Party

== Election results ==
=== Election in the 2020s ===
==== 2022 general election ====
Candidate	Party	Votes	%
Laxmi Mahato Koiri	CPN (UML)	23,402	37.91
Giriraj Mani Pokharel	CPN (Maoist Centre)	22,372	36.24
Poshan Bahadur Thapa	Independent	7,812	12.65
Raj Kishor Sah	Janamat Party	3,598	5.83
Khem Kumari Bhurtel	Rastriya Swatantra Party	2,064	3.34
Others		2,490	4.03
Total		61,738	100.00
Majority		1,030	
CPN (UML) gain			

=== Election in the 2010s ===
==== 2017 legislative elections ====
Party	Candidate	Votes
CPN (Maoist Centre)	Giriraj Mani Pokharel	23,776
Federal Socialist Forum, Nepal	Lajhmi Mahato	19,492
Nepali Congress	Sita Ram Bhandari	9,475
Others		1,051
Invalid votes		3,938
Result	Maoist Centre hold	
Source: Election Commission

==== 2017 Nepalese provincial elections ====
===== 1(A) =====
Party	Candidate	Votes
CPN (Unified Marxist–Leninist)	Sharada Devi Thapa	10,282
Nepali Congress	Prahalad Kumar Chhetri	9,031
Rastriya Janata Party Nepal	Suresh Baitha	6,482
CPN (Maoist Centre)	Raju Khadka	1,918
Others		381
Invalid votes		1,438
Result	CPN (UML) gain	
Source: Election Commission

===== 1(B) =====
Party	Candidate	Votes
Communist Party of Nepal (Maoist Centre)	Bharat Prasad Sah	10,093
Federal Socialist Forum, Nepal	Binod Kumar Mahato	9,669
Nepali Congress	Ram Shrestha Mahato	5,405
Others		543
Invalid votes		1,278
Result	Maoist Centre gain	
Source: Election Commission

==== 2013 Constituent Assembly election ====
Party	Candidate	Votes
UCPN (Maoist)	Giriraj Mani Pokharel	1,0895
Nepali Congress	Chiranjibi Hamal	8,911
Rastriya Madhesh Samajbadi Party	Sharat SIngh Bhandari	7,049
CPN (Unified Marxist–Leninist)	Durga Kumari Dahal	2,277
Others		4,308
Result	Maoist hold	
Source: NepalNews

=== Election in the 2000s ===
==== 2008 Constituent Assembly election ====
Party	Candidate	Votes
Janamorcha Nepal	Giriraj Mani Pokharel	10,196
CPN (Unified Marxist–Leninist)	Arun Kumar Singh	8,846
Nepali Congress	Kamal Kumari Dhule	6,061
Terai Madhes Loktantrik Party	Ram Krishna Mahato	5,633
CPN (Maoist)	Tej Prasad Adhikari	1,394
Others		5,603
Invalid votes		2,868
Result	Janamorcha Nepal gain	
Source: Election Commission

=== Election in the 1990s ===
==== 1999 legislative elections ====
Party	Candidate	Votes
Nepali Congress	Mahendra Yadav	18,408
CPN (Unified Marxist–Leninist)	Raj Kishor Sah	16,879
Rastriya Prajatantra Party	Chandreshwar Prasad Yadav	5,079
CPN (Marxist–Leninist)	Bishnu Narayan Ray Tharu	3,770
Independent	Shyam Kumar Koire	1,098
Others		2,637
Invalid Votes		1,455
Result	Congress hold	
Source: Election Commission

==== 1994 legislative elections ====
Party	Candidate	Votes
Nepali Congress	Mahendra Yadav	15,468
CPN (Unified Marxist–Leninist)	Sitanandan Raya	12,247
Rastriya Prajatantra Party	Chandreshwar Prasad Yadav	5,660
Samyukta Janamorcha Nepal	Ram Narayan Bidari	3,548
CPN (United)	Sahadev Yadav	1,021
Others		1,723
Result	Congress hold	
Source: Election Commission

==== 1991 legislative elections ====
Party	Candidate	Votes
Nepali Congress	Mahendra Yadav	19,619
CPN (Democratic)	Nilambar Acharya	5,137
Result	Congress gain	

== See also ==
- List of parliamentary constituencies of Nepal
