= Rautahat 2 =

Parliamentary constituency in Nepal

- Parliamentary constituency
- Rautahat 2 in Province No. 2
- Province: Madhesh Pradesh
- District: Rautahat District

Current constituency
- Created: 1991
- Party: Nepali Congress
- Member of Parliament: Md. Firdosh Alam

Rautahat 2 is one of four parliamentary constituencies of Rautahat District in Nepal. This constituency came into existence on the Constituency Delimitation Commission (CDC) report submitted on 31 August 2017.

== Incorporated areas ==
Rautahat 2 incorporates Ishanath Municipality, Rajpur Municipality, Paroha Municipality, Baudhimai Municipality, wards 6 and 7 of Maulapur Municipality and wards 1–4 of Dewahi Gonahi Municipality.

== Assembly segments ==
It encompasses the following Province No. 2 Provincial Assembly segment

- Rautahat 2(A)
- Rautahat 2(B)

== Members of Parliament ==
=== Parliament/Constituent Assembly ===
Election	Member	Party
1991	Sheikh Idris	Nepali Congress
1997 by-election	Mohammad Aftab Alam	Nepali Congress
2013	Mohammad Mustaq Alam	Madheshi Janaadhikar Forum, Nepal (Democratic)
April 2017	Mohammad Mustaq Alam	Nepal Loktantrik Forum
2017	Mohammad Aftab Alam	Nepali Congress
2022	Kiran Kumar Sah	Independent
2026	Md. Firdosh Alam	Nepali Congress

=== Provincial Assembly ===
==== 2(A) ====
Election	Member	Party
2017	Nagendra Prasad Sinha	Nepali Congress

==== 2(B) ====
Election	Member	Party
2017	Ram Kishore Prasad Yadav	Federal Socialist Forum, Nepal
May 2019	Ram Kishore Prasad Yadav	Samajbadi Party, Nepal
April 2020	Ram Kishore Prasad Yadav	Janata Samajbadi Party

== Election results ==
=== Election in the 2020s ===
==== 2022 general election ====
Candidate	Party	Votes	%
Kiran Kumar Sah	Independent	32,842	50.81
Mohammad Firdos Alam	Nepali Congress	28,248	43.70
Shailendra Shah	People's Socialist Party, Nepal	2,122	3.28
Ramyas Jha	Janamat Party	1,004	1.55
Others		420	0.65
Total		64,636	100.00
Majority		4,594	
Independent gain			

=== Election in the 2010s ===
==== 2017 legislative elections ====
Party	Candidate	Votes
Nepali Congress	Mohammad Aftab Alam	18,833
Federal Socialist Forum, Nepal	Kiran Kumar Sah	16,865
CPN (Unified Marxist–Leninist)	Mohammad Mustaq Alam	13,883
Others		2,450
Invalid votes		3,277
Result	Congress gain	
Source: Election Commission

==== 2017 Nepalese provincial elections ====
===== 2(A) =====
Party	Candidate	Votes
Nepali Congress	Nagendra Prasad Sinha	11,851
CPN (Unified Marxist–Leninist)	Shailendra Shah	7,761
Rastriya Janata Party Nepal	Dr. Ram Shankar Thakur	5,070
Others		1,488
Invalid votes		1,069
Result	Congress gain	
Source: Election Commission

===== 2(B) =====
Party	Candidate	Votes
Federal Socialist Forum, Nepal	Ram Kishore Prasad Yadav	9,522
CPN (Maoist Centre)	Manoj Kumar Yadav	7,966
Nepali Congress	Ram Chandra Giri	7,757
Others		1,351
Invalid votes		1,297
Result	FSFN gain	
Source: Election Commission

==== 2013 Constituent Assembly election ====
Party	Candidate	Votes
Madhesi Janaadhikar Forum, Nepal (Democratic)	Mohammad Mustaq Alam	13,450
Nepali Congress	Mohammad Aftab Alam	10,405
UCPN (Maoist)	Kiran Kumar Sah	4,685
CPN (Unified Marxist–Leninist)	Abdul Kalam Aazad	1,270
Others		3,518
Result	MJFN(D) gain	
Source: NepalNews

=== Election in the 2000s ===
==== 2008 Constituent Assembly election ====
Party	Candidate	Votes
Nepali Congress	Mohammad Aftab Alam	16,801
CPN (Unified Marxist–Leninist)	Shailendra Sah	7,406
Madhesi Jana Adhikar Forum, Nepal	Abdul Jabbar	5,831
Terai Madhesh Loktantrik Party	Nagendra Prasad Sinha	4,214
CPN (Maoist)	Surendra Prasad Jaiswal	3,861
Others		2,298
Invalid votes		2,425
Result	Congress hold	
Source: Election Commission

=== Election in the 1990s ===
==== 1999 legislative elections ====
Party	Candidate	Votes
Nepali Congress	Mohammad Aftab Alam	29,758
CPN (Unified Marxist–Leninist)	Abul Kalam Aazad	19,775
CPN (Marxist–Leninist)	Kapil Dev Prasad Patel	1,590
Nepal Sadbhawana Party	Lalbabu Yadav	1,057
Others		527
Invalid Votes		1,099
Result	Congress hold	
Source: Election Commission

==== 1997 by-elections ====
Party	Candidate
Nepali Congress	Mohammad Aftab Alam
Result	Congress hold
Source: Election Commission

==== 1994 legislative elections ====
Party	Candidate	Votes
Nepali Congress	Sheikh Idris	22,681
Independent	Dr. Sheikh Moida	8,859
Independent	Rajendra Prasad Patel	7,010
CPN (United)	Mohammad Abbas	5,493
Nepal Sadbhawana Party	Shambhu Prasad	3,654
Rastriya Jana Parishad	Laxman Chaudhary	155
Result	Congress hold	
Source: Election Commission

==== 1991 legislative elections ====
Party	Candidate	Votes
Nepali Congress	Sheikh Idris	28,276
CPN (Democratic)	Bishnu Bahadur Manandhar	13,848
Result	Congress gain	

== See also ==
- List of parliamentary constituencies of Nepal
