= Lalbabu Raut =

Nepalese politician and Chief Minister of Madhesh Province

Mohammad Lalbabu Raut
- लालबाबु राउत
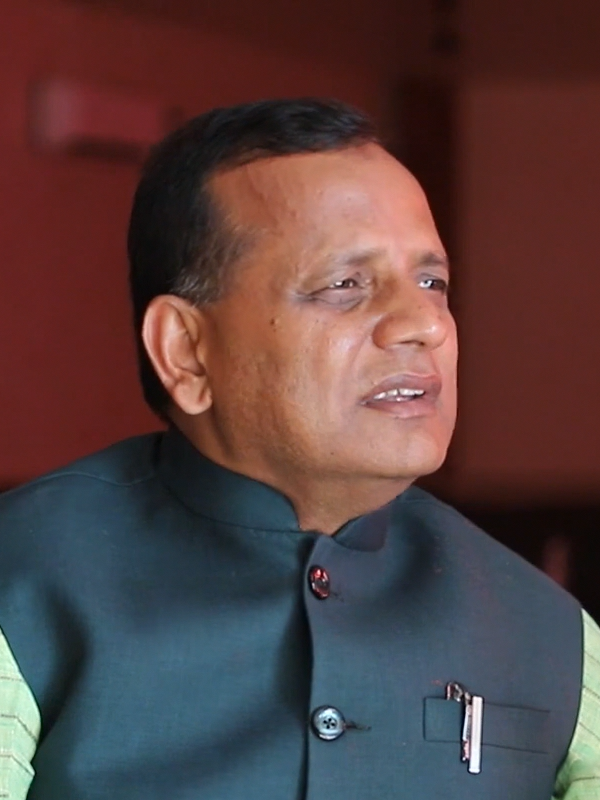
- Lalbabu Raut in his office

1st Chief Minister of Madhesh Province
- In office 15 February 2018 – 11 January 2023
- Governor: Ratneshwar Lal Kayastha; Tilak Pariyar; Rajesh Jha; Hari Shankar Mishra
- Deputy: Ram Saroj Yadav
- Preceded by: Position created
- Succeeded by: Saroj Kumar Yadav

Provincial Assembly of Madhesh Province
- Incumbent
- Assumed office 2017
- Constituency: Parsa Provincial Assembly 1(B)

Personal details
- Born: June 29, 1966 (age 59) Jagarnathpur, Parsa, Nepal
- Party: Federal Socialist Forum, Nepal
- Website: ocmcm.p2.gov.np

Lalbabu Raut, also known as Mohamed Lalbabu raut (Nepali/Maithili/Bhojpuri: लालबाबु राउत), is the first Chief Minister of Madhesh Province, one of the seven federal Provinces of Nepal. He is the parliamentary party leader of People's Socialist Party, Nepal for Madhesh Province.

Raut remains in light in national medias for various irregularities cases during his tenure including the Swachatta Abhiyan, Janaki Mandir beautification, and Beti Bachau Beti Padhau abhiyan for which cases are filed in CIAA.

== Personal life ==
Before being elected in the first-ever constitutional assembly, Raut had also served few years as a teacher in Thakur-ram Multiple Campus at Birgunj. He belongs to Muslim Raut Family.

== Political career ==
Raut, a resident of Parsa was elected to the 2017 provincial assembly elections from Parsa 1(B). Earlier, he served as a member of the Constituent Assembly which promulgated the Constitution of Nepal 2015. On 15 February 2018, Governor Ratneshwar Lal Kayastha administered the oath of office and secrecy to Raut at the governor's office in Janakpur.

Recently, he lost his home town, Jagarnathpur to Shreekant Prasad Yadav of Nepali Congress while his wife lost as deputy chairperson candidate.

== See also ==
- Rajendra Kumar Rai
- Rajendra Prasad Pandey
- Krishna Chandra Nepali
- Kul Prasad KC
- Jeevan Bahadur Shahi
- Trilochan Bhatta

Political offices
Preceded by Constitution created	Chief Minister of Madhesh Province; February 2018 – January 2023	Succeeded by incumbent
