= 2nd Koshi Provincial Assembly =

Legislature in Koshi province, Nepal

←	1st Assembly

Overview
- Legislative body: Koshi Provincial Assembly
- Jurisdiction: Koshi Province, Nepal
- Meeting place: DCC Office, Biratnagar, Morang District
- Term: 1 January 2023 –
- Election: 2022
- Government: First Hikmat Kumar Karki cabinet; First Uddhav Thapa cabinet; Second Uddhav Thapa cabinet; Second Hikmat Kumar Karki cabinet; Kedar Karki cabinet; Third Hikmat Kumar Karki cabinet

Provincial Assembly
- Members: 93
- Speaker: Baburam Gautam (CPN (MC)) (until 1 August 2023) (Note: Resigned from office); Ambar Bahadur Bista (RPP) (from 9 January 2024)
- Deputy Speaker: Sirjana Danuwar (CPN (UML))
- Leader of the House: Hikmat Kumar Karki (CPN (UML)); Uddhav Thapa (NC); Kedar Karki (NC)
- Leader of the Opposition: Uddhav Thapa (NC); Hikmat Kumar Karki (CPN (UML)); Bhakti Prasad Sitaula (RPP); Indra Bahadur Angbo (NCP)
- Party control: Government (69): CPN (UML): 40; Congress: 29; Confidence & Supply (1): PSP: 1; Opposition (23): NCP: 17; RPP: 6

Sessions
- 1st: 1 January 2023 – 12 April 2023
- 2nd: 28 May 2023 – 14 June 2023
- 3rd: 29 June 2023 – 23 August 2023
- 4th: 4 October 2023 – 10 January 2024
- 5th: 13 May 2024 – 20 September 2024
- 6th: 20 January 2025 – 20 March 2025
- 7th: 18 May 2025 – Incumbent

The 2nd Koshi Provincial Assembly was elected through the provincial elections held on 20 November 2022. The assembly has 56 constituency seats in which members are elected through direct elections and 36 proportional representation party list seats. The term of the assembly is 5 years unless dissolved earlier. The first session of the assembly commenced from 1 January 2023.

Baburam Gautam of the CPN (Maoist Centre) was elected as the Speaker of the provincial assembly on 12 January 2023.

== Leaders ==
=== Officers ===
- Speaker of the Assembly: Hon. Baburam Gautam (CPN (Maoist Centre))
- Deputy Speaker of the Assembly: Hon. Srijana Danuwar (CPN (UML))
- Leader of the House: Hon. Uddhav Thapa (Nepali Congress)
- Leader of the Opposition: Hon. Hikmat Kumar Karki (CPN (UML))

=== Parliamentary party ===
- Parliamentary party leader of CPN (Unified Marxist–Leninist): Hon. Hikmat Kumar Karki
- Parliamentary party leader of Nepali Congress: Hon. Uddhav Thapa
- Parliamentary party leader of CPN (Maoist Centre): Hon. Indra Bahadur Angbo
- Parliamentary party leader of Rastriya Prajatantra Party: Hon. Bhakti Prasad Sitaula
- Parliament party leader of CPN (Unified Socialist): Hon. Rajendra Kumar Rai

=== Chief Whip ===
- Chief Whip of CPN (UML): Hon. Rewati Raman Bhandari
  - Whip of CPN (UML): Hon. Sirjana Rai
- Chief Whip of Nepali Congress: Hon. Bhupendra Rai
- Chief Whip of Rastriya Prajatantra Party: Hon. Ambar Bahadur Bista
- Chief Whip of CPN (Unified Socialist): Hon. Bidya Chamling Rai

== Composition ==

Party	Seats					
Party	After election			At present		
Party	FPTP	PR	Total	FPTP	PR	Total
CPN (UML)	25	15	40	25	15	40
Nepali Congress	17	12	29	17	12	29
CPN (Maoist Centre)	9	4	13	9	4	13
Rastriya Prajatantra Party	2	4	6	2	4	6
CPN (Unified Socialist)	3	1	4	3	1	4
People's Socialist Party	0	1	1	0	1	1
Total	56	37	93	56	37	93

== Members ==
The assembly has 93 members of whom 56 are elected through first-past-the-post voting and 37 are elected through proportional representation.

CPN (UML) (40)
Constituency/PR group	Member	Portfolio & Responsibilities / Remarks
Officers of the Provincial Assembly
Indigenous peoples	Sirjana Danuwar	Deputy Speaker of Provincial Assembly
Members of Provincial Assembly
Jhapa 5(A)	Hikmat Kumar Karki	Chief Minister (until 7 July 2023 – 7 July 2023; 8 September 2023 – 18 October 2023; Since 9 May 2024); Leader of the Opposition (7 July 2023 — 8 September 2023; 3 November 2023 – 9 May 2024); Parliamentary party leader
Ilam 2(B)	Ram Bahadur Ranamagar	Deputy parliamentary party leader; Deputy Leader of the Opposition (7 July 2023 – 8 September 2023; 3 November 2023 – 9 May 2024)
Sunsari 2(A)	Rewati Raman Bhandari	Chief whip
Indigenous people	Sirjana Rai	Whip
Solukhumbu 1 (B)	Buddhi Kumar Rajbhandari	Minister for Social Development (until 7 July 2023); Minister for Tourism, Forests and Environment (until 7 July 2023)
Taplejung 1(A)	Til Kumar Menyangbo	Minister for Drinking Water, Irrigation and Energy (until 7 July 2023); Minister for Health (until 7 July 2023)
Sankhuwasabha 1(B)	Bidur Kumar Lingthep	
Khotang 1(A)	Pach Karna Rai	
Dhankuta 1(A)	Niran Rai	
Dhankuta 1(B)	Indra Mani Parajuli	
Tehrathum 1(A)	Kishor Chandra Dulal	
Sunsari 1(A)	Ramesh Kumar Basnet	
Sunsari 1(B)	Bijay Kumar Rai	
Sunsari 2(B)	Ram Prasad Mahato	
Sunsari 3(A)	Rohit Bahadur Karki	
Sunsari 3(B)	Ramdev Yadav	
Morang 1(A)	Umakanta Gautam	
Morang 1(B)	Khadga Bahadur Basnet	
Morang 2(B)	Lila Ballabh Adhikari	
Morang 3(B)	Gyanendra Subedi	
Morang 4(A)	Jay Prakash Chaudhary	
Jhapa 2(A)	Ek Raj Karki	
Jhapa 2(B)	Tilchan Pathak	
Jhapa 3(B)	Chhabilal Chudal	
Jhapa 4(A)	Radha Krishna Khanal	
Jhapa 5(B)	Hom Bahadur Thapa	
Khas Arya	Sheila Dixit Karki	
Khas Arya	Tara Devi Dhakal	
Khas Arya	Nira Devi Khanal	
Khas Arya	Gita Devi Regmi	
Indigenous people	Kamala Thapa Magar	
Indigenous people	Mina Shrestha	
Indigenous people	Malati Kumari Limbu	
Indigenous people	Yasoda Kayastha	
Indigenous people	Namwar Lal Dhimal	
Tharu	Lalita Kumari Chaudhary	
Madheshi	Gita Rani Mahato	
Muslim	Nurshadi Begum	
Dalit	Kamala Darnal	

Nepali Congress (29)
Constituency/PR group	Member	Portfolio & Responsibilities / Remarks
Khas Arya	Uddhav Thapa	Leader of the Opposition (until 7 July 2023); Chief Minister; Parliamentary Party Leader
Udayapur 1(B)	Himal Karki	Deputy parliamentary Party Leader; Deputy Leader of the Opposition (until 7 July 2023
Khotang 1(B)	Bhupendra Rai	Chief whip
Okhaldhunga 1(A)	Pradip Kumar Sunuwar	Minister without portfolio (since 7 July 2023)
Udayapur 2(B)	Ram Kumar Khatri	Minister without portfolio (since 9 July 2023)
Taplejung 1(B)	Khagen Singh Rai	
Bhojpur 1(B)	Binod Rai	
Ilam 1(B)	Shamsher Rai	
Ilam 2(A)	Govind Giri	
Sunsari 4(A)	Sadanand Mandal	
Sunsari 4(B)	Esrail Mansuri	
Morang 3(A)	Man Bahadur Limbu	
Morang 4(B)	Bhim Parajuli	
Morang 5(A)	Gayaand Mandal Gangai	
Morang 5(B)	Amrit Kumar Aryal	
Morang 6(B)	Kedar Karki	
Jhapa 1(A)	Gopal Tamang	
Jhapa 3(A)	Bhumi Prasad Rajbanshi	
Khas Arya	Indira Thapa	
Khas Arya	Khageshwari Paudel	
Indigenous people	Mohan Maharjan	
Indigenous people	Maiya Shrestha	
Indigenous people	Dolma Tamang	
Indigenous people	Lila Kumari Rai	
Indigenous people	Mamta Tamang Magar	
Indigenous people	Shobha Chemjong	
Tharu	Sunita Gachhadar (Chaudhary)	
Indigenous people	Sunita Kumari Gurung	
Madheshi	Lakhi Kumari Ganesh	

CPN (Maoist Centre) (13)
Constituency/PR group	Member	Portfolio & Responsibilities / Remarks
Officers of the Provincial Assembly
Okhaldhunga 1(B)	Baburam Gautam	Speaker of Provincial Assembly
Members of Provincial Assembly
Panchthar 1(B)	Indra Bahadur Angbo	Parliamentary party leader
Morang 6 (A)	Jivan Acharya	Minister for Economic Affairs and Planning (since 9 July 2023); Minister for Tourism, Forests and Environment (until 7 June 2023)
Sankhuwasabha 1(A)	Rajendra Karki	Minister without portfolio (since 9 July 2023)
Tehrathum 1(B)	Durga Prasad Chapagain	Minister for Transport, Infrastructure and Urban Development (until 7 June 2023)
Solukhumbu 1(A)	Gombu Sherpa	
Udayapur 1(A)	Rajan Kiranti	
Morang 2(A)	Ganesh Prasad Upreti	
Udayapur 2 (A)	Narayan Bahadur Burja Magar	
Khas Arya	Gita Timsina	
Indigenous people	Bandana Jhangad	
Indigenous people	Samjhana Tamang Thamsuhang	
Dalit	Sapana Darji	

Rastriya Prajatantra Party (6)
Constituency/PR group	Member	Portfolio & Responsibilities / Remarks
Jhapa 4(B)	Bhakti Prasad Sitaula	Parliamentary party leader; Minister for Industry, Agriculture and Co-Operatives (until 7 July 2023); Minister for Transport, Infrastructure and Urban Development (until 7 July 2023)
Khas Arya	Ambar Bahadur Bista	Chief whip
Jhapa 1(B)	Sabina Bhajgai	
Indigenous people	Premraj Thamsuhang	
Indigenous people	Nimsari Rajbanshi	
Dalit	Gopal Bahadur Bishwakarma	

CPN (Unified Socialist) (4)
Constituency/PR group	Member	Portfolio & Responsibilities / Remarks
Bhojpur 1(A)	Rajendra Kumar Rai	Parliamentary party leader
Indigenous people	Bidya Chamling Rai	Chief Whip
Panchthar 1(A)	Kamal Prasad Jabegu	Minister without portfolio (since 7 July 2023)
Ilam 1(A)	Khinu Langwa Limbu	

People's Socialist Party (1)
Constituency/PR group	Member	Portfolio & Responsibilities / Remarks
Indigenous people	Nirmala Limbu	Minister for Health (until 31 May 2023)

=== Changes ===
Constituency/PR group	MPA	Party	Date seat vacated	Cause of vacation	New MPA	Party
Jhapa 4(B)	Bhakti Prasad Sitaula	RPP	19 January 2026	Resigned to contest the 2026 general election in Jhapa-4 constituency		
Sunsari 2(A)	Rewati Raman Bhandari	CPN (UML)	19 January 2026	Resigned to contest the 2026 general election in Dang-1 constituency		
