= Third Hikmat Kumar Karki cabinet =

9th Government of Koshi Province since 9 May 2024

Third Hikmat Karki cabinet
- 9th Cabinet of Koshi Province

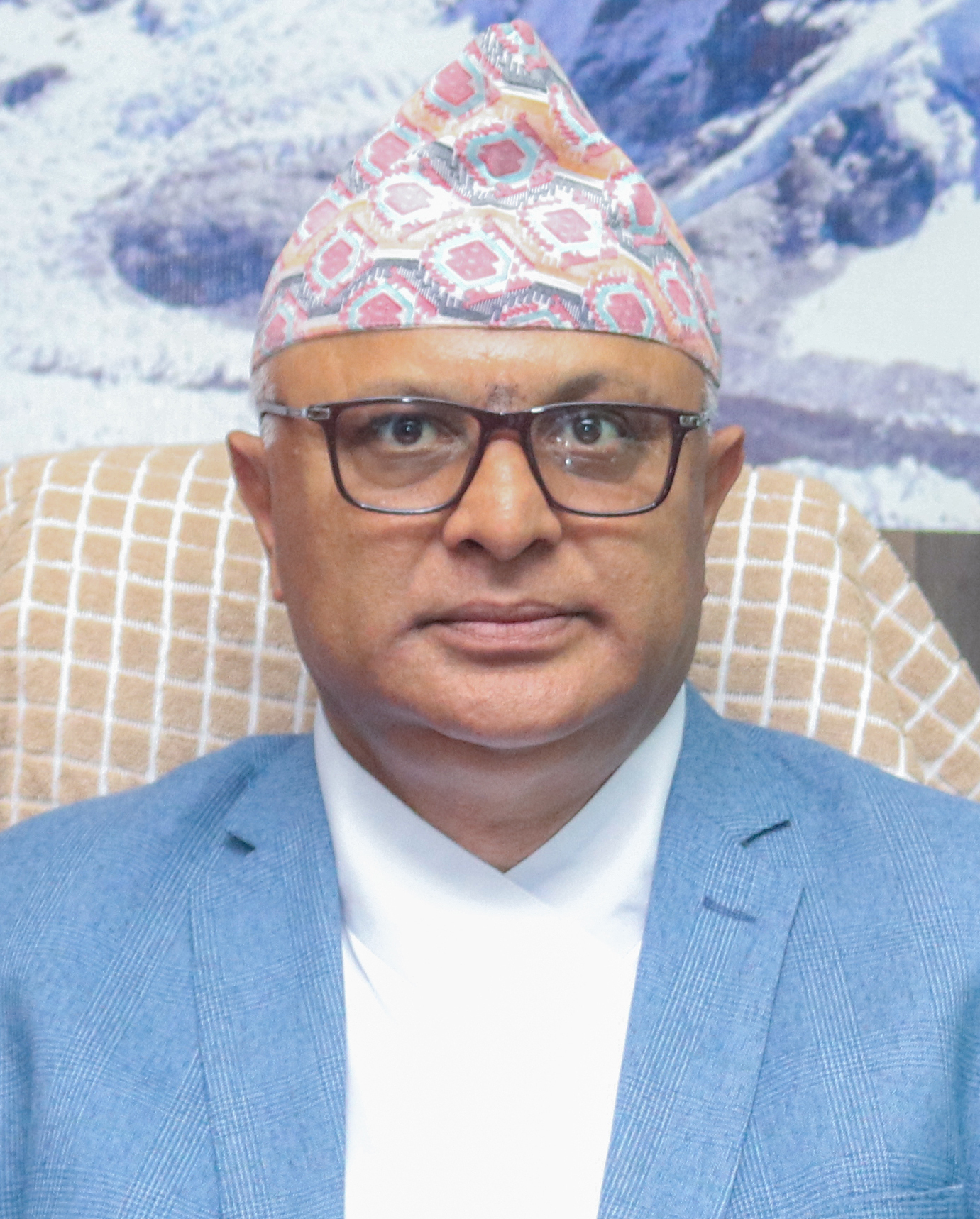
- Hon'ble Chief Minister Hikmat Kumar Karki
- Date formed: 9 May 2024

People and organisations
- Governor: Parshuram Khapung
- Chief Minister: Hikmat Kumar Karki
- No. of ministers: 3
- Member parties: CPN (UML); Nepali Congress
- Opposition party: CPN (Maoist Centre)
- Opposition leader: Indra Bahadur Angbo, (CPN (Maoist Centre))

History
- Election: 2022
- Legislature term: 5 years
- Predecessor: Kedar Karki cabinet

The Third Hikmat Karki cabinet is the current and 9th provincial government of Koshi Province. It was formed after Hikmat Kumar Karki was sworn in as Chief Minister of Koshi Province on 9 May 2024. Karki's claim for chief minister was supported by the Communist Party of Nepal (Unified Marxist–Leninist) and Communist Party of Nepal (Maoist Centre).

On 13 May 2024, Karki won a motion of confidence with 57 out of 62 votes in the 93-member of Koshi Provincial Assembly, where he was supported by the ruling coalition as CPN (Unified Marxist-Leninist), CPN (Maoist Centre) and CPN (Unified Socialist).

On 26 July 2024, all ministers from the CPN (Maoist Centre) resigned from the government, with the party also withdrawing its support, after a new coalition of between the Nepali Congress and CPN (Unified Marxist-Leninist), which positions CPN-UML to lead the Koshi provincial government.

After two and a half months of the ruling coalition formed between the Nepali Congress and the CPN (UML), Nepali Congress entered the government of Koshi Province on 13 September 2024 with three ministers and one state minister. On 18 September 2024, Karki again received the vote of confidence, according to Speaker Amber Bahadur Bista, 83 out of 93 koshi provincial assembly members 66 were cast in favor and 15 votes against.

== Former arrangements ==
=== With CPN (MC) as major Partner ===
==== Till 26 July 2024 ====
S.N.	Portfolio	Minister Constituency	Political Party	Assumed office	Left office
Cabinet ministers
1	Chief Minister; All other ministries not allocated to anyone.	Hikmat Kumar Karki; MPA for Jhapa 5(B)	CPN (UML)	9 May 2024	Incumbent
2	Minister for Economic Affairs and Planning	Ram Bahadur Ranamagar; MPA for Ilam 2(B)	CPN (UML)	9 May 2024	Incumbent
3	Minister for Physical Infrastructure Development	Ganesh Upreti; MPA for Morang 2(A)	Maoist Centre	9 May 2024	26 July 2024
4	Minister for Internal Affairs and Law	Lila Ballabh Adhikari; MPA for Morang 2(B)	CPN (UML)	17 May 2024	Incumbent
5	Minister for Social Development	Panch Karna Rai; MPA for Khotang 1(A)	CPN (UML)	17 May 2024	Incumbent
6	Minister for Water Supply, Irrigation and Energy	Ek Raj Karki; MPA for Jhapa 2(B)	CPN (UML)	17 May 2024	Incumbent
7	Minister for Tourism, Forest, and Environment	Narayan Bahadur Magar; MPA for Udayapur 2(B)	Maoist Centre	17 May 2024	26 July 2024
8	Minister for Health	Rajendra Karki; MPA for Sankhuwasabha 1(A)	Maoist Centre	17 May 2024	26 July 2024
State ministers
9	Minister of State in the Office of the Chief Minister and Council of Ministers	Sirjana Rai; List MPA	CPN (UML)	17 May 2024	Incumbent
10	Minister of State for Tourism, Forest, and Environment	Bandana Jhangad; List MPA	Maoist Centre	17 May 2024	26 July 2024

== See also ==
- First Hikmat Karki cabinet
- Second Hikmat Karki cabinet
