= Kedar Karki cabinet =

8th Government of Koshi Province from 15 October 2023 to 9 May 2024

- 8th Cabinet of Koshi Province

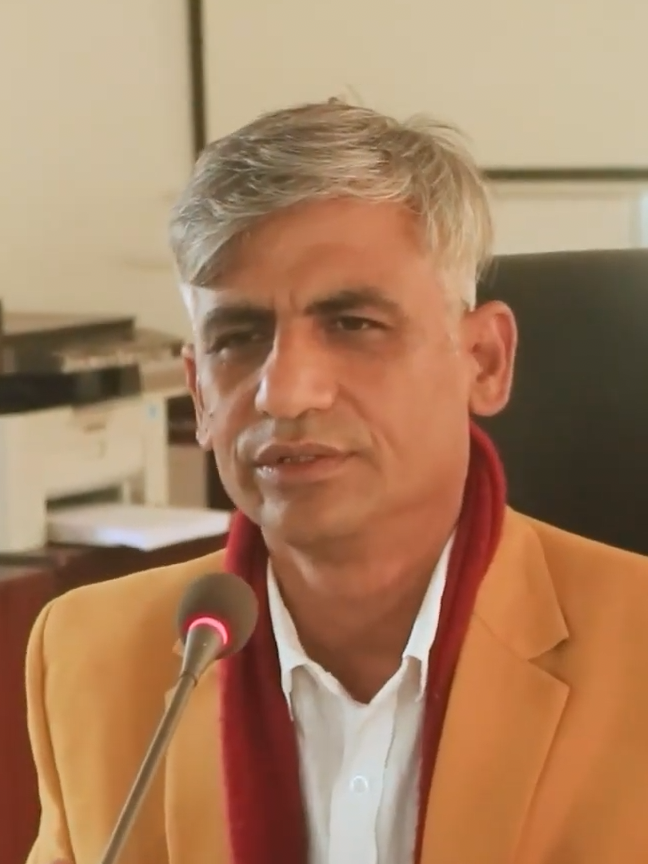
- Hon'ble Chief Minister Kedar Karki
- Date formed: 15 October 2023
- Date dissolved: 9 May 2024

People and organisations
- Governor: Parshuram Khapung
- Chief Minister: Kedar Karki
- No. of ministers: 8
- Ministers removed: 4 resigned
- Member parties: Nepali Congress; CPN (Unified Socialist) Former members; CPN (UML); CPN (MC); PSP-N
- Status in legislature: Provincial Assembly 87 / 93 (94%) Majority Coalition Government (October October 2023 – April 2024) Provincial Assembly 33 / 93 (35%) Minority government (October April 2024 – May 2024)
- Opposition party: CPN (UML)
- Opposition leader: Hikmat Kumar Karki, CPN (UML)

History
- Election: 2022
- Legislature term: 5 years
- Predecessor: Second Hikmat Kumar Karki cabinet
- Successor: Third Hikmat Kumar Karki cabinet

The Kedar Karki cabinet was the 8th provincial government of Koshi Province. It was formed after Kedar Karki was sworn in as Chief Minister of Koshi Province on 15 October 2023.

== Ministries ==
| S.N. | Portfolio | Minister Constituency | Political Party | Assumed office | Left office |
|---|---|---|---|---|---|
Cabinet ministers
| 1 | Chief Minister; All other ministries not allocated to anyone. | Kedar Karki; MPA for Morang 6(B) | Congress | 15 October 2023 | 9 May 2024 |
| 2 | Minister for Internal Affairs and Law | Shamsher Rai; MPA for Ilam 1(B) | Congress | 15 October 2023 | 9 May 2024 |
| 3 | Minister for Physical Infrastructure Development | Kamal Prasad Jabegu; MPA for Panchthar 1(A) | Unified Socialist | 3 November 2023 | 9 May 2024 |
| 4 | Minister for Health | Pradeep Kumar Sunuwar; MPA for Okhaldhunga 1(A) | Congress | 9 February 2024 | 9 May 2024 |
| 5 | Minister for Industry, Agriculture and Cooperatives | Ram Kumar Khatri; MPA for Udayapur 2(B) | Congress | 9 February 2024 | 9 May 2024 |
State ministers
| 7 | Minister of State for Economic Affairs and Planning | Indira Thapa; MPA for List MPA | Congress | 9 February 2024 | 9 May 2024 |
| 8 | Minister of State for Internal Affairs and Law | Sunita Kumari Gurung; MPA for List MPA | Congress | 9 February 2024 | 9 May 2024 |

== Former Ministries ==
=== Until April 2024 ===
| S.N. | Portfolio | Minister Constituency | Political Party | Assumed office | Left office |
|---|---|---|---|---|---|
Cabinet ministers
| 1 | Chief Minister; All other ministries not allocated to anyone. | Kedar Karki; MPA for Morang 6(B) | Congress | 15 October 2023 | 9 May 2024 |
| 2 | Minister for Internal Affairs and Law | Shamsher Rai; MPA for Ilam 1(B) | Congress | 15 October 2023 | 9 May 2024 |
| 3 | Minister for Tourism, Forest, and Environment | Ganesh Upreti; MPA for Morang 2(A) | Maoist Centre | 3 November 2023 | 8 April 2024 |
| 4 | Minister for Physical Infrastructure Development | Kamal Prasad Jabegu; MPA for Panchthar 1(A) | Unified Socialist | 3 November 2023 | 9 May 2024 |
| 5 | Minister for Health | Pradip Kumar Sunuwar; MPA for Okhaldhunga 1(A) | Congress | 9 February 2024 | 9 May 2024 |
| 6 | Minister for Industry, Agriculture and Cooperatives | Ram Kumar Khatri; MPA for Udayapur 2(B) | Congress | 9 February 2024 | 9 May 2024 |
| 7 | Minister for Water Supply, Energy and Irrigation | Narayan Bahadur Burja Magar; MPA for Udayapur 2(A) | Maoist Centre | 9 February 2024 | 8 April 2024 |
| 8 | Minister for Social Development | Rajendra Karki; MPA for Sankhuwasabha 1(A) | Maoist Centre | 9 February 2024 | 8 April 2024 |
State ministers
| 9 | Minister of State for Economic Affairs and Planning | Indira Thapa; List MPA | Congress | 9 February 2024 | 9 May 2024 |
| 10 | Minister of State for Internal Affairs and Law | Sunita Kumari Gurung; MPA for List MPA | Congress | 9 February 2024 | 9 May 2024 |

=== Until 9 February 2024 ===
| S.N. | Portfolio | Minister Constituency | Political Party | Assumed office | Left office |
|---|---|---|---|---|---|
Cabinet ministers
| 1 | Chief Minister; All other ministries not allocated to anyone. | Kedar Karki; MPA for Morang 6(B) | Congress | 15 October 2023 | 9 May 2024 |
| 2 | Minister for Internal Affairs and Law | Shamsher Rai; MPA for Ilam 1(B) | Congress | 15 October 2023 | 9 May 2024 |
| 3 | Minister for Tourism, Forest, and Environment | Ganesh Upreti; MPA for Morang 2(A) | Maoist Centre | 3 November 2023 | 8 April 2024 |
| 4 | Minister for Physical Infrastructure Development | Kamal Prasad Jabegu; MPA for Panchthar 1(A) | Unified Socialist | 3 November 2023 | 9 May 2024 |

=== Until 4 November ===
| S.N. | Portfolio | Minister Constituency | Political Party | Assumed office | Left office |
|---|---|---|---|---|---|
Cabinet ministers
| 1 | Chief Minister; All other ministries not allocated to anyone. | Kedar Karki; MPA for Morang 6(B) | Congress | 15 October 2023 | 9 May 2024 |
| 2 | Minister without portfolio | Ram Bahadur Ranamagar; MPA for Ilam 2(B) | CPN (UML) | 15 October 2023 | 3 November 2023 |
| 3 | Minister without portfolio | Shamsher Rai; MPA for Ilam 1(B) | Congress | 15 October 2023 | 9 May 2024 |
| 4 | Minister without portfolio | Ganesh Upreti; MPA for Morang 2(A) | Maoist Centre | 3 November 2023 | 8 April 2024 |
| 5 | Minister without portfolio | Kamal Prasad Jabegu; MPA for Panchthar 1(A) | Unified Socialist | 3 November 2023 | 9 May 2024 |

== Ministries by Party ==
1. Nepali Congress (100%)

| Party | Cabinet Ministers | Ministers of State | Total Ministers |
|---|---|---|---|
| Nepali Congress | 2 | 0 | 2 |

== See also ==
- Surendra Raj Pandey cabinet
- Dilli Bahadur Chaudhary cabinet
- Kamal Bahadur Shah cabinet
