= Provincial governments of Nepal =

Governments of the 7 Nepalese provinces

The provincial governments of Nepal are the governments ruling over the 7 provinces and have legislative assemblies as well as governments with the head of Council of Ministers in every state being the Chief Minister, who also serves as the head of the government. Power is divided between the Central Government (federal government) and the province governments. The central government appoints a Governor for each province, who serves as the ceremonial head of state.

Each province has a Provincial Assembly, which serves as the unicameral legislature of the province. The Provincial Assembly holds the legislative authority on matters assigned to the provinces by the Constitution of Nepal. Members of the Provincial Assembly are directly elected by the people through a mixed electoral system. The Provincial Assembly is responsible for drafting provincial laws, approving budgets, and cross checking the provincial executive tasks headed by the Chief Minister.

While the Central government handles defense, foreign affairs, citizenship, national economic policy, international trade, and major infrastructure projects etc., provincial governments handles affairs within their respective provinces, including provincial roads, healthcare services, agriculture, tourism, education programs, and regional development projects etc., while implementing federal laws and policies at the provincial level.

== Legislative ==
Each province has a unicameral provincial legislature, varying in size according to the population of the province. The members are elected through first-past-the-post voting and party-list proportional representation for a term of five years, unless dissolved sooner. The first provincial election was held in 2017. The first provincial election was held in 2017.

The provincial assemblies are presided over by the Speaker who is elected from amongst the members of the assembly and is not a part of the debates. The speaker is helped by a Deputy Speaker who is also elected from amongst the members. At least one of the Speaker or the Deputy Speaker must be a woman and they must not belong to the same party unless only one party is represented in the assembly. Nanda Gurung is the first and only woman to be elected as the speaker of a provincial assembly. She is currently serving as the Speaker of Karnali Provincial Assembly having been elected in 2023.

The governors of the provinces have the power to summon and prorogue the sessions of the assembly pursuant to the Constitution. The interval between two consecutive sessions of the assemblies cannot exceed six months. If one-fourth of the total members of an assembly make a petition during a prorogation or recess of the assembly, the governor must call a session or a meeting.

Assembly	Meeting place	Seats	Speaker	Deputy Speaker	Term
Koshi Province	Biratnagar, Morang	93	Ambar Bahadur Bista	Sirjana Danuwar	2nd Assembly
Madhesh Province	Janakpur, Dhanusha	107	Ram Chandra Mandal	Babita Devi Raut Ishar	2nd Assembly
Bagmati Province	Hetauda, Makwanpur	110	Bhuwan Kumar Pathak	Apsara Chapagai	2nd Assembly
Gandaki Province	Pokhara, Kaski	60	Krishna Prasad Dhital	Bina Kumari Thapa	2nd Assembly
Lumbini Province	Bhalubang, Dang	87	Tularam Gharti Magar	Menuka Khand K.C.	2nd Assembly
Karnali Province	Birendranagar, Surkhet	40	Nanda Gurung	Yashoda Neupane	2nd Assembly
Sudurpashchim Province	Godawari, Kailali	53	Bhim Bahadur Bhandari	Koili Devi Chaudhary	2nd Assembly

== Executive ==
Party affiliation of chief ministers by province as of December 2025 ▌Nepali Congress (4 provinces) ▌CPN (UML) (3 provinces)

The executive power of a province is vested in the provincial cabinet. If a cabinet does not exist, the executive power is exercised by the governor of the province.

The head of the provincial cabinet is the chief minister. The governor appoints the leader of the parliamentary party that commands a majority, either alone or with the support of one or more parties, in the provincial assembly as the chief minister. The governor appoints members to the provincial cabinet on the recommendation of the chief minister. The members of the provincial cabinet are responsible for the various departments of the provincial administration. A provincial cabinet can only consist of a maximum of 20% of the total number of members of the provincial assembly. A non-member of a provincial assembly can be appointed as a minister in the cabinet, but must obtain membership of the assembly within six months of their appointment.

The assembly can force the resignation of the chief minister with a vote of no confidence.

Province	Chief Minister	Party	Took office	Cabinet
Koshi	Hikmat Kumar Karki	CPN (UML)	9 May 2024	H. K. Karki III
Madhesh	Krishna Prasad Yadav	Congress	4 December 2025	KP Yadav
Bagmati	Indra Bahadur Baniya	Congress	5 August 2025	Baniya
Gandaki	Surendra Raj Pandey	Congress	29 May 2024	Pandey II
Lumbini	Chet Narayan Acharya	CPN (UML)	24 July 2024	Acharya
Karnali	Yam Lal Kandel	CPN (UML)	10 April 2024	Kandel
Sudurpashchim	Kamal Bahadur Shah	Nepali Congress	5 August 2024	Shah II

=== Cabinet of Koshi ===
S.N.	Portfolio	Minister responsible	Political Party	Constituency	Assumed office
Cabinet ministers
1	Chief Minister; All other ministries not allocated to anyone.	Hikmat Kumar Karki	CPN (UML)	Jhapa 5(A)	9 May 2024
2	Minister for Physical Infrastructure Development	Pradip Kumar Sunuwar	Congress	Okhaldhunga 1(A)	6 January 2026
3	Minister for Tourism, Forest, and Environment	Bhim Parajuli	Congress	Morang 4(B)	6 January 2026
6	Minister for Water Supply, Irrigation and Energy	Tilchan Pathak	CPN (UML)	Jhapa 2(B)	6 January 2026
5	Minister for Internal Affairs and Law	Indra Mani Parajuli	CPN (UML)	Dhankuta 1(B)	6 January 2026
6	Minister for Economic Affairs and Planning	Bidur Kumar Lingthep	CPN (UML)	Sankhuwasabha 1(B)	6 January 2026
7	Minister for Social Development	Ram Prasad Mahato	CPN (UML)	Sunsari 2(B)	6 January 2026
8	Minister for Health	Man Bahadur Limbu	Congress	Morang 3(A)	6 January 2026
9	Minister for Industry, Agriculture and Cooperatives	Esrael Mansuri	Congress	Sunsari 4(B)	6 January 2026
State ministers
9	Minister of State for Internal Affairs and Law	Umakanta Gautam	CPN (UML)	Morang 1(A)	6 January 2026
10	Minister of State for Physical Infrastructure Development	Shobha Chemjong	Congress	Party list	6 January 2026

=== Cabinet of Madhesh Province ===
S.N.	Portfolio	Minister responsible	Political Party	Constituency	Took office
Cabinet ministers
1	Chief Minister; All other ministries not allocated to anyone.	Krishna Prasad Yadav	Congress	Rautahat 1 (B)	5 December 2025
2	Minister for Physical Infrastructure Development	Mohammad Sameer	CPN (UML)	Bara 3 (B)	26 May 2026
3	Minister for Finance	Yubaraj Bhattarai	NCP	Rautahat 4 (A)	26 May 2026
4	Minister for Sports and Social Welfare	Lakhan Das Tatma	CPN (UML)	Dhanusha 2 (A)	26 May 2026
5	Minister for Forest and Environment	Shankar Prasad Chaudhary	Congress	Parsa 4 (A)	31 December 2025
6	Minister for Labour and Transport	Sharada Devi Thapa	CPN (UML)	Mahottari 1 (A)	26 May 2026
7	Minister for Industry, Commerce and Tourism	Kanish Patel	NCP	Rautahat 2 (B)	15 December 2025
8	Minister for Land Management, Agriculture and Cooperatives	Shyam Prasad Patel	Congress	Parsa 2 (A)	31 December 2025
9	Minister for Energy, Irrigation and Water	Jawahar Lal Kushwaha	NCP	Sarlahi 3 (A)	15 December 2025
10	Minister for Home Affairs, Communications and Law	Fakeera Mahato	NCP	Sarlahi 4 (B)	31 December 2025
11	Minister for Education and Culture	Manoj Kumar Singh	CPN (UML)	Siraha 3 (A)	26 May 2026
12	Minister for Health and Population	Nagendra Sah	Congress	Rautahat 1 (A)	26 May 2026

=== Cabinet of Bagmati Province ===
S.N.	Portfolio	Minister responsible	Political Party	Constituency	Took office
Cabinet ministers
1	Chief Minister	Indra Bahadur Baniya	Nepali Congress	Makwanpur 1 (B)	5 August 2025
2	Minister for Agriculture and Livestock Development	Madhusudan Paudel	CPN (UML)	Kathmandu 1 (A)	5 August 2025
3	Minister for Internal Affairs and Law	Shivraj Adhikari	Nepali Congress	PR List	5 August 2025
4	Minister for Health	Kiran Thapa Magar	CPN (UML)	Bhaktapur 2 (A)	24 July 2024
5	Minister for Youth and Sports	Urmila Nepal	Nepali Congress	Lalitpur 1 (B)	15 August 2025
6	Minister for Social Development	Kanchan Chandra Bade	Nepali Congress	Kavre 2 (B)	15 August 2025
7	Minister for Physical Infrastructure Development	Dinesh Chandra Devkota	CPN (UML)	PR List (Khas Arya)	5 August 2025
8	Minister for Economic Affairs and Planning	Prabhat Kumar Tamang	Nepali Congress	Rasuwa 1 (A)	15 August 2025
9	Minister for Forest and Environment	Bharat Bahadur K.C.	CPN (UML)	Dolakha 1 (B)	5 August 2025
10	Minister for Culture and Tourism	Suresh Shrestha	Nepali Congress	Bhaktapur 1 (A)	15 August 2025
11	Minister for Labour, Employment and Transportation	Jayaram Thapa	CPN (UML)	Kathmandu 4 (B)	5 August 2025
12	Minister for Drinking Water, Energy and Irrigation	Krishna Kumar Tamang	Nepali Congress	Sindhupalchok 2 (B)	5 August 2025
13	Minister for Industry, Commerce, Land and Administration	Bindu Shrestha	CPN (UML)	Party list (Indigenous)	5 August 2025
14	Minister for Cooperatives and Poverty Alleviation	Binu Rayamajhi Poudel	Nepali Congress	Party list (Khas Arya - Women)	15 August 2025

=== Cabinet of Gandaki Province ===
S.N.	Portfolio	Minister responsible	Political Party	Constituency	Assumed office
Cabinet ministers
1	Chief Minister; All other ministries not allocated to anyone.	Surendra Raj Pandey	Congress	Gorkha 2 (B)	29 May 2024
2	Minister for Physical Infrastructure Development and Transport	Gobinda Bahadur Nepali	CPN (UML)	Party list	15 April 2026
3	Minister for Energy, Water Resources and Water Supply	Nanda Prasad Neupane	Congress	Gorkha 1 (B)	15 April 2026
4	Minister for Economic Affairs	Jeet Bahadur Sherchan	Congress	Baglung 2 (A)	15 April 2026
5	Minister for Agriculture, Land Management and Cooperatives	Bhim Bahadur Karki	CPN (UML)	Kaski 2 (A)	15 April 2026
6	Minister for Industry and Tourism	Yashoda Rimal	CPN (UML)	Party list	15 April 2026
7	Minister for Social Development, Youth and Sports	Rekha Gurung	Congress	Party list	15 April 2026
8	Minister for Health	Laxman Bahadur Pandey	CPN (UML)	Nawalpur 2 (B)	15 April 2026
9	Minister for Forest and Environment	Namdu Gurung	Congress	Mustang 1 (A)	15 April 2026

=== Cabinet of Lumbini Province ===
S.N.	Portfolio	Minister responsible	Political Party	Constituency	Took office
Cabinet ministers
1	Chief Minister	Chet Narayan Acharya	CPN (UML)	Arghakhanchi 1 (A)	24 July 2024
2	Minister for Forests and Environment	Badshah Kurmi	Congress	Banke 3 (B)	24 July 2024
3	Minister for Physical Infrastructure Development	Ratna Bahadur Khatri	CPN (UML)	Banke 3 (A)	8 June 2026
4	Minister for Agriculture, Land Management and Cooperatives	Tulsi Prasad Chaudhary	CPN (UML)	Rupandehi 3 (B)	8 June 2026
5	Minister for Economic Affairs	Dhanendra Karki	Congress	Gulmi 1 (B)	24 July 2024
6	Minister for Urban Development and Water Supply	Saroj Thapa	Congress	Pyuthan 1 (B)	24 July 2024
7	Minister for Industry, Tourism and Transport Management	Prachanda Bikram Neupane	Congress	Dang 2 (B)	24 July 2024
8	Minister for Health	Ramji Prasad Ghimire	CPN (UML)	Arghakhanchi 1 (B)	8 June 2026
9	Ministry for Energy, Water Resources, and Irrigation	Dilli Raj Bhusal	CPN (UML)	Gulmi 2 (A)	8 June 2026
10	Minister for Interior Affairs and Law	Bhandari Lal Ahir	Janata Samajbadi Party, Nepal	Banke 2 (A)	8 June 2026
11	Minister for Social Development	Janma Jaya Timilsina	Congress	Bardiya 2 (A)	
12	Ministry for Youth and Sports	Santosh Kumar Pandey	Loktantrik Samajwadi	Rupandehi 3 (A)	

=== Cabinet of Karnali Province ===
S.N.	Portfolio	Minister responsible	Political Party	Constituency	Took office
Cabinet ministers
1	Chief Minister: Minister for Internal Affairs and Law	Yam Lal Kandel	CPN (UML)	Surkhet 2 (A)	9 April 2024
2	Minister for Economic Affairs	Rajeev Bikram Shah	Nepali Congress	Jajarkot 1 (B)	4 August 2024
3	Minister for Land Management, Agriculture and Cooperatives	Binod Kumar Shah	CPN (UML)	Dailekh 2 (B)	30 April 2024
4	Minister for Physical Infrastructure and Urban Development	Sher Bahadur Budha	CPN (UML)	Dolpa 1 (A)	30 April 2024
5	Minister for Social Development	Ghanashyam Bhandari	Nepali Congress	Dailekh 2 (A)	4 August 2024
6	Minister for Water Resource and Energy Development	Bijaya Budha	Nepali Congress	Party list	4 August 2024
7	Minister for Industry, Tourism, Forest and Environment	Suresh Adhikari	Nepali Congress	Salyan 1 (B)	4 August 2024
State ministers
1	Minister of State for Physical Infrastructure and Urban Development	Gamata Bishwakarma	CPN (UML)	Party list	30 April 2024

=== Cabinet of Sudurpashchim Province ===
S.N.	Portfolio	Minister responsible	Political Party	Constituency	Took office
Cabinet Ministers
1	Chief Minister	Kamal Bahadur Shah	Congress	Kailali 2 (A)	5 August 2024
2	Minister for Physical Infrastructure Development	Surendra Bahadur Pal	CPN (UML)	Baitadi 1 (A)	5 August 2024
3	Minister for Internal Affairs and Law	Hira Sarki	CPN (UML)	Party list (Dalit)	5 August 2024
4	Minister for Land Management, Agriculture and Cooperatives	Bir Bahadur Thapa	CPN (UML)	Kanchanpur 1 (A)	5 August 2024
5	Minister for Economic Affairs	Bikram Singh Dhami	Nepali Congress	Darchula 1 (A)	8 June 2026
6	Minister of Social Development	Vel Bahadur Rana Magar	Nepali Congress	Achham 1 (A)	8 June 2026
7	Minister of Industry, Tourism, Forest and Environment	Man Bahadur Rawal	Nepali Congress	Achham 2 (B)	8 June 2026
State Ministers
1	Minister of State in the Ministry of Physical Infrastructure Development	Nirmala Devi Saud	CPN (UML)	Party list (Khas Arya - Backward Area)	5 August 2024
2	Minister of State for Social Development	Madhu Devi Bharati	Nepali Congress	Party list (Khas Arya)	8 June 2026
3	Minister of State for Economic Affairs	Janu Kumari Dani	Nepali Congress	Party list (Khas Arya)	8 June 2026

== Judiciary ==
The former appellate courts were changed into High Courts after the adoption of the new constitution.

High Courts of Nepal
S.N.	High Court	Jurisdiction	Primary seat	Chief Judge	Ref.
1	Biratnagar High Court (Koshi)	Morang District, Sunsari District, and Udaypur District	Biratnagar	Shri Ramesh Prasad Rajbhandari	
2	Janakpur High Court (Madhesh)	Dhanusha District, Mahottari District, and Sarlahi District	Janakpur	Binod Sharma (Acting)	
3	Patan High Court (Bagmati)	Kathmandu District, Lalitpur District, Bhaktapur District, Rasuwa District, Nuwakot District, Kavrepalanchowk District, Sindhupalchowk District, Dolakha District, Ramechhap District, Sindhuli District, and Dhading District	Lalitpur	Nripa Dhoj Niraula	
4	Pokhara High Court (Gandaki)	Kaski District, Lamjung District, Tanahu District, Manang District, Gorkha District, Syangja District, and Nawalpur District	Pokhara	Ramesh Pokharel	
5	Tulsipur High Court (Lumbini)	Dang District, Pyuthan District, Rolpa District and Eastern Rukum District	Tulsipur	Nita Gautam Dixit	
6	Surkhet High Court (Karnali)	Surkhet District, Salyan District, West Rukum District, Dailekh District and Jajarkot District	Birendranagar	Sheshraj Shiwakoti (Acting)	
7	Dipayal High Court (Sudurpashchim)	Bajura District, Bajhang District, Achham District, Doti District, and Kailali District	Dipayal	Tej Bahadur Karki (Acting)	

Additional Benches and Extended Benches of Nepal

S.N.	High Court	Additional and Extended Benches	Jurisdiction	Primary seat	Senior-most Judge
1	Biratnagar High Court	Ilam Bench	Jhapa District, Ilam District, Panchthar District, and Taplejung District	Illam	Premraj Karki
2	Biratnagar High Court	Dhankuta Bench	Dhankuta District, Terathum District, Sankhuwasabha District, and Bhojpur District	Dhankuta	Pusparaj Koirala
3	Biratnagar High Court	Okhaldhunga Bench	Okhaldhunga District, Khotang District, and Solukhumbhu District	Okhaldhunga	Thakur Prasad Sharma Poudel
4	Janakpur High Court	Rajbiraj Bench	Saptari District and Siraha District	Rajbiraj	Diliraj Acharya
5	Janakpur High Court	Birgunj Bench	Parsa District, Bara District and Rautahat District	Birgunj	Sharanga Subedi
6	Patan High Court	Hetauda Bench	Chitwan District and Makwanpur District	Hetauda	Mohammad Shabir Hussain
7	Pokhara High Court	Baglung Bench	Baglung District, Parbat District, Myagdi District and Mustang District	Baglung	Dwarikaman Joshi
8	Tulsipur High Court	Butwal Bench	Rupandehi District, Nawalparasi District, Kapilvastu District, Gulmi District, Palpa District, and Arghakhanchi District	Butwal	Shivaraj Adhikari
9	Tulsipur High Court	Nepalgunj Bench	Banke District and Bardiya District	Nepalgunj	Dr. Ratna Bahadur Bagchand
10	Surkhet High Court	Jumla Bench	Jumla District, Kalikot District, Humla District, Mugu District, and Dolpa District	Jumla	Gunaraj Dhungel
11	Dipayal High Court	Mahendranagar Bench	Kanchanpur District, Darchula District, Baitadi District and Dadeldhura District	Bhimdatta	Prabha Basnet

== See also ==
- Government of Koshi Province
- Government of Madhesh Province
- Government of Nepal
- Council of Ministers of Nepal
- Provinces of Nepal
- List of current Nepalese governors
