= 1st Province No. 1 Provincial Assembly =

2017 provincial election in Nepal

1st Koshi Province Provincial Assembly
2nd Assembly	→

Overview
- Legislative body: Koshi Provincial Assembly
- Jurisdiction: Koshi Pradesh, Nepal
- Meeting place: District Coordination Committee Office, Biratnagar, Morang District
- Term: 5 February 2018 – September 2022
- Election: 2017 provincial elections
- Government: Sher Dhan Rai cabinet; Bhim Acharya cabinet; Rajendra Rai cabinet
- Website: assembly.p1.gov.np

Provincial Assembly
- Members: 93
- Speaker: Pradeep Kumar Bhandari (UML)
- Deputy Speaker: Saraswoti Pokhrel (Maoist)
- Leader of the House: Sher Dhan Rai (UML); Bhim Acharya (UML); Rajendra Kumar Rai (CPN (Unified Socialist))
- Leader of the Opposition: Rajiv Koirala (NC); Bhim Acharya (UML)

The first Koshi Provincial Assembly was elected by the 2017 provincial elections. 93 members were elected to the assembly, 56 of whom were elected through direct elections and 37 of whom were elected through the party list proportional representation system. The term of the assembly started on 5 February 2018 and ended in September 2022. Sher Dhan Rai and Bhim Acharya served as chief ministers from CPN (Unified Marxist–Leninist) and Rajendra Kumar Rai served as chief minister from CPN (Unified Socialist) during the term of the assembly. Pradeep Kumar Bhandari served as the speaker of the assembly and Saraswati Pokharel served as deputy speaker.

== Composition ==
Party	Seats	
Party	After election	At dissolution
CPN (UML)	51	37
Nepali Congress	21	21
CPN (Maoist Centre)	15	15
CPN (Unified Socialist)	—	10
People's Socialist Party	—	3
Rastriya Prajatantra Party	1	1
Sanghiya Loktantrik Rastriya Manch	1	1
Federal Socialist Forum	3	—
Independent	1	—
Vacant	—	3
Total	93	93

== Leaders ==
=== Office bearers ===
- Speaker of the Provincial Assembly: Hon. Pradeep Kumar Bhandari
  - Deputy Speaker of the Provincial Assembly: Saraswoti Pokhrel
- Leader of the House:
  - Hon. Sher Dhan Rai (CPN (UML)) (until 26 August 2021)
  - Hon. Bhim Acharya (CPN (UML)) (from 26 August 2021 to 1 November 2021)
  - Hon. Rajendra Kumar Rai (CPN (Unified Socialist)) (from 1 November 2021)
- Leader of the Opposition:
  - Hon. Rajiv Koirala (Nepali Congress) (until 1 November 2021)
  - Hon. Bhim Acharya (CPN (UML)) (from 1 November 2021)

=== Parliamentary Party Leaders ===
- Parliamentary Party Leader (CPN (UML)):
  - Hon. Sher Dhan Rai (CPN (UML)) (until 26 August 2021)
  - Hon. Bhim Acharya (CPN (UML)) (from 26 August 2021)
- Parliamentary Party Leader (Nepali Congress): Rajiv Koirala
  - Deputy Parliamentary Party Leader: Himal Karki
- Parliamentary Party Leader (CPN (Maoist Centre)): Indra Bahadur Angbo
- Parliamentary Party Leader (CPN (Unified Socialist)): Rajendra Kumar Rai
- Parliamentary Party Leader (People's Socialist Party, Nepal): Jay Ram Yadav
- Parliamentary Party Leader (Rastriya Prajatantra Party): Indira Rai
- Parliamentary Party Leader (Sanghiya Loktantrik Rastriya Manch): Bishnu Maya Tubahamphe

=== Whips ===
- Chief Whip (CPN (UML)): Buddhi Kumar Rajbhandari
- Chief Whip (Nepali Congress): Kedar Karki
  - Whip (Nepali Congress): Suyarma Raj Rai

== Members ==
Constituency (PR if blank)	Member	Party
	Aasha Ratna Jabegu	CPN (UML)
Sunsari 3(B)	Agam Lal Chaudhary	Nepali Congress
	Ambika Thapa	CPN (UML)
Okhaldhunga 1(A)	Ambir Babu Gurung	CPN (UML)
Jhapa 5(B)	Arjun Rai	CPN (UML)
Taplejung 1(A)	Bal Bahadur Samsohang	CPN (UML)
	Basanti Devi Yadav	CPN (UML)
Jhapa 3(A)	Bashanta Kumar Baniya	CPN (UML)
Sunsari 1(B)	Bhim Prasad Acharya	CPN (UML)
	Bidya Nanda Chaudhari	Nepali Congress
Morang 4(A)	Bijay Kumar Bishwas	CPN (Maoist Centre)
Udayapur 1(A)	Bimal Karki	CPN (UML)
	Bina Devi Rai	CPN (UML)
	Bindiya Karki	Nepali Congress
	Bishnu Tumbahangphe	Sanghiya Loktantrik Rastriya Manch
Jhapa 2(B)	Brikh Bahadur Pradhan	CPN (UML)
Solukhumbu 1(B)	Buddhi Kumar Rajbhandari	CPN (UML)
	Chandra Prakash Shrestha	Nepali Congress
Morang 6(A)	Chum Narayan Tabadar	Nepali Congress
Ilam 2(B)	Dhirendra Sharma	CPN (Maoist Centre)
Jhapa 2(A)	Ekraj Karki	CPN (UML)
Panchthar 1(A)	Ganesh Kumar Kambang	CPN (Unified Socialist)
Morang 5(A)	Gyaneshwor Rajbanshi	CPN (UML)
Jhapa 5(A)	Hikmat Kumar Karki	CPN (UML)
Udayapur 1(B)	Himal Karki	Nepali Congress
Jhapa 4(B)	Hira Kumar Thapa	CPN (UML)
	Hom Kumari Sawa	CPN (UML)
	Indira Rai	Rastriya Prajatantra Party
Panchthar 1(B)	Indra Bahadur Angbo	CPN (Maoist Centre)
Dhankuta 1(B)	Indra Mani Parajuli	CPN (UML)
Sunsari 4(A)	Jagadish Prasad Kusiyat	CPN (UML)
	Jasmaya Gajamer (Bishwakarma)	CPN (UML)
Morang 5(B)	Jayaram Yadav	People's Socialist Party
Jhapa 4(A)	Jhalak Bahadur Magar	CPN (Maoist Centre)
Morang 4(B)	Jiwan Ghimire	CPN (UML)
	Jyoti Subba	Nepali Congress
Udayapur 2(B)	Kala Ghale	CPN (UML)
	Kalpana Kumari Sardar	Nepali Congress
Morang 6(B)	Kedar Karki	Nepali Congress
Ilam 1(A)	Khinu Langwa (Limbu)	CPN (Unified Socialist)
	Krishna Kumari Rai	CPN (Unified Socialist)
Morang 1(A)	Kul Prasad Samba	CPN (Maoist Centre)
	Kusum Kumari Shrestha	CPN (Maoist Centre)
Terathum 1(A)	Lachhuman Tiwari	CPN (UML)
Morang 2(B)	Lila Ballabh Adhikari	CPN (UML)
	Lila Subba	Nepali Congress
Sunsari 3(A)	Lilam Basnet	CPN (UML)
	Lok Prakash Sangraula	Nepali Congress
Sunsari 4(B)	Mohammad Tahir Miya	Nepali Congress
Okhaldhunga 1(B)	Mohan Kumar Khadka	CPN (Maoist Centre)
Udayapur 2(A)	Narayan Bahadur Magar	CPN (Maoist Centre)
	Nawodeeta Chaudhari	Nepali Congress
Dhankuta 1(A)	Niran Rai	CPN (UML)
	Om Prakash Sarawagi	Nepali Congress
	Padam Kumari Gurung	CPN (Unified Socialist)
Sunsari 1(A)	Pradip Kumar Bhandari	CPN (UML)
	Pratap Prakash Haagam	Nepali Congress
Sankhuwasabha 1(A)	Purna Prasad Rai (Yamphu)	CPN (Maoist Centre)
Jhapa 3(B)	Purna Prasad Rajbanshi	CPN (Maoist Centre)
	Radha Thapa	People's Socialist Party
Morang 3(B)	Raj Kumar Ojha	CPN (UML)
Khotang 1(A)	Rajan Rai	CPN (Unified Socialist)
Bhojpur 1(A)	Rajendra Kumar Rai	CPN (Unified Socialist)
Sunsari 2(B)	Rajiv Koirala	Nepali Congress
Ilam 2(A)	Ram Bahadur Magar	CPN (UML)
	Ram Chandra Limbu	People's Socialist Party
Khotang 1(B)	Ram Kumar Rai	CPN (Maoist Centre)
	Sabitra Kumrai Regmi	CPN (Unified Socialist)
	Sabitri Joshi	CPN (UML)
	Sanja Kumari Danuwar	Nepali Congress
	Saraswati Pokharel	CPN (Maoist Centre)
Sunsari 2(A)	Sarbadhaj Sawa Limbu	CPN (UML)
	Sarita Thapa	CPN (Unified Socialist)
	Saubhagyawati Devi Rai Kirat	CPN (Maoist Centre)
	Shanta Devi Paudel	Nepali Congress
	Shekhar Chandra Thapa	Nepali Congress
Bhojpur 1(B)	Sher Dhan Rai	CPN (UML)
Morang 2(A)	Shiva Narayan Ganagain	Nepali Congress
Jhapa 1(A)	Shree Prasad Mainali	CPN (UML)
	Sita Devi Thebe (Jabegu)	CPN (Maoist Centre)
	Sunita Kumari Chaudhari	CPN (Unified Socialist)
Morang 3(A)	Suyarma Raj Rai	Nepali Congress
Terathum 1(B)	Tejman Kandangwa	CPN (UML)
Sankhuwasabha 1(B)	Tulsi Prasad Neupane	CPN (UML)
	Umita Bishwakarma	CPN (Maoist Centre)
Morang 1(B)	Upendra Prasad Ghimire	CPN (Unified Socialist)
	Usha Kala Rai	CPN (UML)
Solukhumbu 1(A)	Uttam Kumar Basnet	CPN (UML)
	Yashoda Adhikari	CPN (UML)

=== Defections ===
Name	Date	From	To	Constituency (PR if blank)
Narayan Bahadur Magar	5 February 2018	Independent	CPN (Maoist Centre)	Udayapur 2(A)

=== Changes ===
Constituency/PR group	Previous MP	Party	Date seat vacated	Cause of vacation	New MP	Party
Taplejung 1(B)	Tanka Angbuhang Limbu	CPN (Maoist Centre)	5 April 2021	Expelled for joining CPN (UML)		
Ilam 1(B)	Kaji Man Kagate	CPN (UML)	24 April 2022	Resignation to contest as mayor of Suryodaya		
Jhapa 1(B)	Gopal Chandra Budhathoki	CPN (UML)	24 April 2022	Resignation to contest as mayor of Mechinagar		
	Gulefun Khatun	CPN (UML)	30 June 2022	Resignation		CPN (UML)

== See also ==
- Koshi Province
- 2017 Nepalese provincial elections
