= Narayan Bahadur Burja Magar =

Nepalese politician

Honourable Narayan Bahadur Burja Magar
- नारायण बहादुर बुर्जा मगर

Minister for Tourism, Forests and Environment of Koshi Province
- In office 17 May 2024 – 26 July 2024
- Governor: Parshuram Khapung
- Chief Minister: Hikmat Kumar Karki
- Preceded by: Ganesh Prasad Upreti
- Succeeded by: Sadananda Mandal

Minister for Water Supply, Irrigation and Energy of Koshi Province
- In office 9 February 2024 – 8 April 2024
- Governor: Parshuram Khapung
- Chief Minister: Kedar Karki
- Preceded by: Buddhi Kumar Rajbhandari
- Succeeded by: Ek Raj Karki

Member of the Koshi Provincial Assembly
- Incumbent
- Assumed office 5 February 2018
- Constituency: Udayapur 2 (A)

Personal details
- Born: 17 April 1964 (age 62) Udayapur District, Nepal
- Party: Communist Party of Nepal (Maoist Centre)

Narayan Bahadur Burja Magar (Nepali: नारायण बहादुर बुर्जा मगर) is a Nepalese politician, belonging to the CPN (Maoist Centre) Party. Magar is currently serving as the Minister for Water Supply Irrigation and Energy of Koshi Province since 9 February 2024.

Magar is a member of the Koshi Provincial Assembly having been elected from Udayapur 2 (A) constituency since 2017.
