= Indra Mani Parajuli =

Nepali politician

Honourable Indra Mani Parajuli
- इन्द्रमणि पराजुली

Minister for Internal Affairs and Law of Koshi Province
- Incumbent
- Assumed office 6 January 2026
- Governor: Parshuram Khapung
- Chief Minister: Hikmat Kumar Karki
- Preceded by: Rewati Raman Bhandari

Chairperson of the Koshi Provincial Assembly Committee on Justice, Administration and Legislation
- In office 6 April 2019 – 2 September 2022
- Preceded by: Position established
- Succeeded by: Kamala Darnal

Member of the Koshi Provincial Assembly
- Incumbent
- Assumed office 5 February 2018
- Preceded by: Constituency established
- Constituency: Dhankuta 1(B)

Personal details
- Born: 2 November 1969 (age 56) Nepal
- Party: Communist Party of Nepal (Unified Marxist-Leninist) (before 2018; since 2021)
- Other political affiliations: Nepal Communist Party (2018–2021)
- Spouse: Sita Thapa (Parajuli)

Indra Mani Parajuli Nepali: इन्द्रमणि पराजुली is a Nepalese politician, belonging to the Communist Party of Nepal (Unified Marxist–Leninist) Party. Parajuli is currently serving as the Minister for Internal Affairs and Law of Koshi Province. He also serves as a member of the Koshi Provincial Assembly and was elected from Dhankuta 1(B) constituency. Parajuli had served as Chairperson of the Provincial Assembly Committee on Justice, Administration and Legislation.

== Electoral history ==
=== 2022 provincial elections ===
==== Dhankuta 1 (B) ====
Candidate	Party	Votes	%
Indra Mani Parajuli	CPN (UML)	15,797	51.44
Kusum Kumari Shrestha	Maoist Centre	11,230	36.57
Shyam Bahadur Gurung	RPP	1,715	5.58
Dambar Bahadur Katuwal	PSP-N	774	2.52
Others		1,195	3.89
Total		30,711	100.00
Majority		4,567	
CPN (UML)			
Source: Election Commission

=== 2017 provincial elections ===
==== Dhankuta 1 (B) ====
Candidate	Party	Votes	%
Indra Mani Parajuli	CPN (UML)	20,652	65.66
Arjun Thapa	FSF-N	8,231	26.17
Dajanbo Sherpa	URPP (Nationalist)	1,921	6.11
Others		648	2.06
Total		31,452	100.00
Valid votes		31,452	95.58
Invalid/blank votes		1,453	4.42
Total votes		32,905	100.00
CPN (UML) gain			
Source: Election Commission
