= Sirjana Danuwar =

Nepalese politician

Honourable Sirjana Danuwar
- सृजना दनुवार

Deputy Speaker of the Koshi Provincial Assembly
- Incumbent
- Assumed office 14 January 2023
- Governor: Parshuram Khapung
- Chief Minister: Hikmat Kumar Karki; Uddhav Thapa; Kedar Karki
- Speaker: Baburam Gautam, Ambar Bahadur Bista
- Preceded by: Saraswati Pokharel

Member of the Koshi Provincial Assembly
- Incumbent
- Assumed office 26 December 2022

Personal details
- Born: 15 October 1977 (age 48) Udayapur District
- Party: CPN (Unified Marxist–Leninist)
- Other political affiliations: Nepal Communist Party

Sirjana Danuwar (Nepali: सृजना दनुवार) is a Nepalese politician currently serving as the 2nd Deputy Speaker of the Koshi Provincial Assembly. She is currently serving as a member of the 2nd Koshi Provincial Assembly. In the 2022 Nepalese provincial election she was elected as a proportional representative from the indigenous people category.
