= First Hikmat Kumar Karki cabinet =

4th Government of Koshi Province from 9 January to 7 July 2023

- 4th Cabinet of Koshi Province

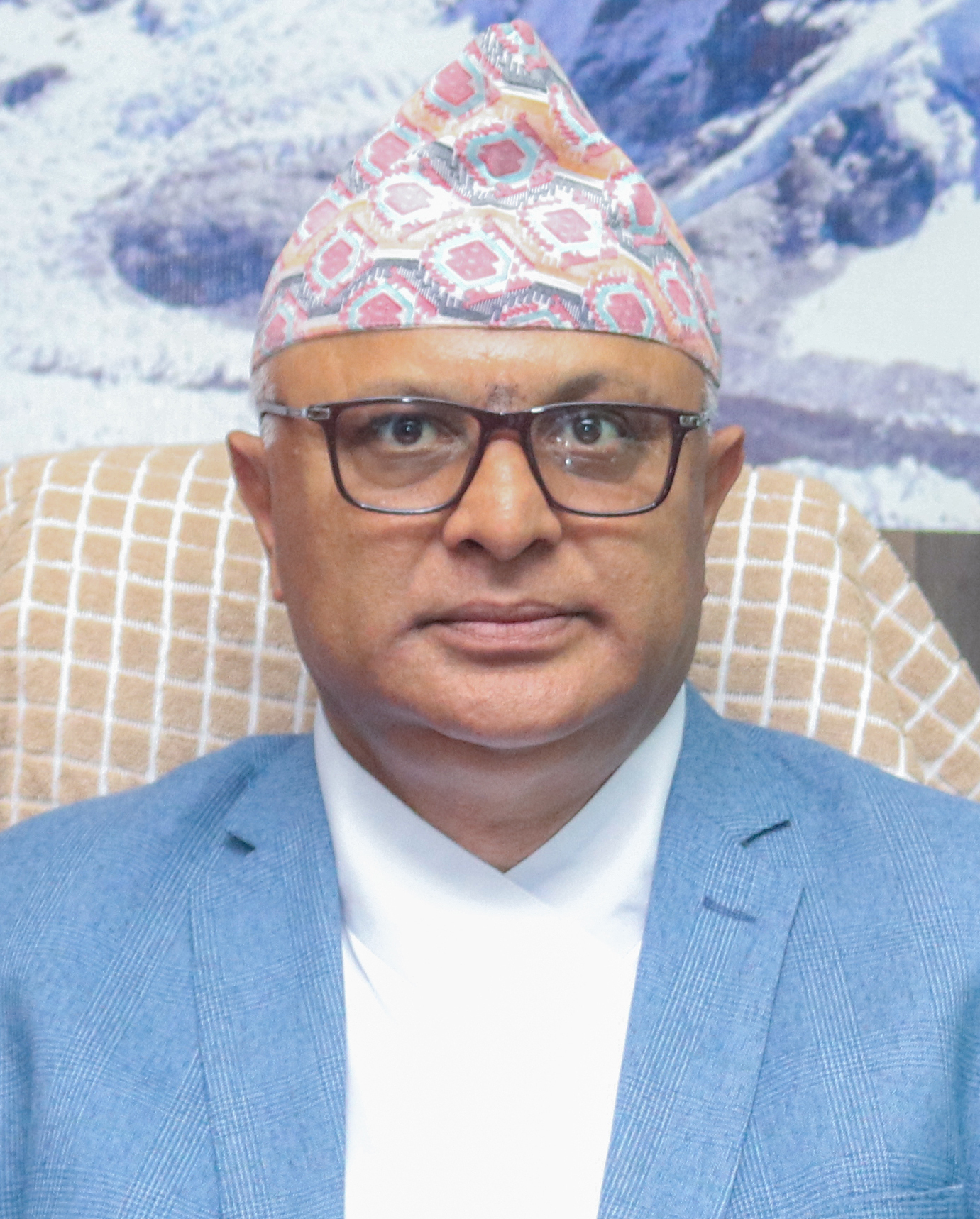
- Hon'ble Chief Minister Hikmat Kumar Karki
- Date formed: 9 January 2023
- Date dissolved: 7 July 2023

People and organisations
- Governor: Parshuram Khapung
- Chief Minister: Hikmat Kumar Karki
- No. of ministers: 6
- Member parties: CPN (UML) Coalition partner; RPP Former members; Maoist Centre; PSP-N
- Status in legislature: Majority Coalition Government (January - June 2023); Minority Coalition Government (June - July 2023)
- Opposition party: Nepali Congress
- Opposition leader: Uddhav Thapa, (NC)

History
- Election: 2022
- Legislature term: 5 years
- Predecessor: Rajendra Kumar Rai cabinet
- Successor: First Uddhav Thapa cabinet

The Hikmat Kumar Karki cabinet was the 4th provincial government of Koshi Province. It was formed after Hikmat Kumar Karki was sworn in as Chief Minister of Koshi Province on 9 January 2023.

== History ==
Karki was appointed Chief minister on 9 January 2023. His claim to chief minister was supported by his party CPN (UML), CPN (Maoist Centre), PSP-N and RPP. He won 59 votes against 32 in the vote of confidence. He was opposed by Nepali Congress and CPN (US). Due to change in political coalition in federal government, PSP-N quit government on 31 May 2023. CPN (MC) also quit government and withdrew support on 7 June 2023. Karki failed to secure vote in the 2nd vote of confidence, gathering only 46 votes, 40 from his party, CPN (UML) and 6 from RPP, which is one less than majority. 43 members from Nepali Congress, CPN (Maoist Centre) and CPN (Unified Socialist) voted against Karki. 4 members including PSP-N's single MP abstained from voting. Consequently, Uddhav Thapa succeeded him as the chief minister.

== Ministries ==
=== Until 7 July 2023 ===
S.N.	Portfolio	Minister	Political Party	Assumed office	Left office
Cabinet ministers
1	Chief minister All other ministries not allocated to anyone.	Hikmat Kumar Karki	CPN (UML)	9 January 2023	7 July 2023
2	Minister for Drinking Water, Irrigation and Energy	Til Kumar Menyangbo	CPN (UML)	9 January 2023	7 July 2023
3	Minister for Social Development	Buddhi Kumar Rajbhandari	CPN (UML)	13 January 2023	7 July 2023
4	Minister for Industry, Agriculture and Co-Operatives	Bhakti Prasad Sitaula	RPP	9 January 2023	7 July 2023

=== Former arrangements ===
==== Until 7 June 2023 ====
S.N.	Portfolio	Minister	Political Party	Assumed office	Left office
Cabinet ministers
1	Chief minister All other ministries not allocated to anyone.	Hikmat Kumar Karki	CPN (UML)	9 January 2023	Incumbent
2	Minister for Drinking Water, Irrigation and Energy	Til Kumar Menyangbo	CPN (UML)	9 January 2023	Incumbent
3	Minister for Social Development	Buddhi Kumar Rajbhandari	CPN (UML)	13 January 2023	Incumbent
4	Minister for Tourism, Forests and Environment	Jeevan Acharya	Maoist Centre	13 January 2023	7 June 2023
5	Minister for Transport Infrastructure and Urban Development	Durga Prasad Chapagain	Maoist Centre	13 January 2023	7 June 2023
6	Minister for Industry, Agriculture and Co-Operatives	Bhakti Prasad Sitaula	RPP	9 January 2023	Incumbent

==== Until 31 May 2023 ====
S.N.	Portfolio	Minister	Political Party	Assumed office	Left office
Cabinet ministers
1	Chief minister All other ministries not allocated to anyone.	Hikmat Kumar Karki	CPN (UML)	9 January 2023	Incumbent
2	Minister for Drinking Water, Irrigation and Energy	Til Kumar Menyangbo	CPN (UML)	9 January 2023	Incumbent
3	Minister for Social Development	Buddhi Kumar Rajbhandari	CPN (UML)	13 January 2023	Incumbent
4	Minister for Tourism, Forests and Environment	Jeevan Acharya	Maoist Centre	13 January 2023	Incumbent
5	Minister for Transport Infrastructure and Urban Development	Durga Prasad Chapagain	Maoist Centre	13 January 2023	Incumbent
6	Minister for Industry, Agriculture and Co-Operatives	Bhakti Prasad Sitaula	RPP	9 January 2023	Incumbent
7	Minister of Health	Nirmala Limbu	PSP-Nepal	9 January 2023	31 May 2023

== Ministries by Party ==
1. CPN (UML) (75.0%)
2. RPP (25.0%)

Party	Cabinet Ministers	Ministers of State	Total Ministers
CPN (UML)	3	0	3
RPP	1	0	1

== See also ==
- Kamal Bahadur Shah cabinet
- Saroj Kumar Yadav cabinet
