= Sunita Kumari Gurung =

Nepalese politician

Honourable Sunita Kumari Gurung
- सुनिता कुमारी गुरुङ

Minister of State for Internal Affairs and Law of Koshi Province
- In office 9 February 2024 – 9 May 2024
- Governor: Parshuram Khapung
- Chief Minister: Kedar Karki
- Minister: Shamsher Rai
- Preceded by: Lila Ballabh Adhikari

Member of the Koshi Provincial Assembly
- Incumbent
- Assumed office 26 December 2022

Personal details
- Born: Nepal
- Party: Nepali Congress

Sunita Kumari Gurung (Nepali: सुनिता कुमारी गुरुङ) is a Nepalese politician and member of the Nepali Congress Party. Gurung has been serving as the Minister of State for Internal Affairs and Law of Koshi Province since 9 February 2024. She is currently serving as a member of the 2nd Koshi Provincial Assembly. In the 2022 Nepalese provincial election she was elected as a proportional representative from the Indigenous people category.
