= Second Hikmat Kumar Karki cabinet =

7th Government of Koshi Province from 8 September to 15 October 2023

Second Hikmat Karki cabinet
- 7th Cabinet of Koshi Province

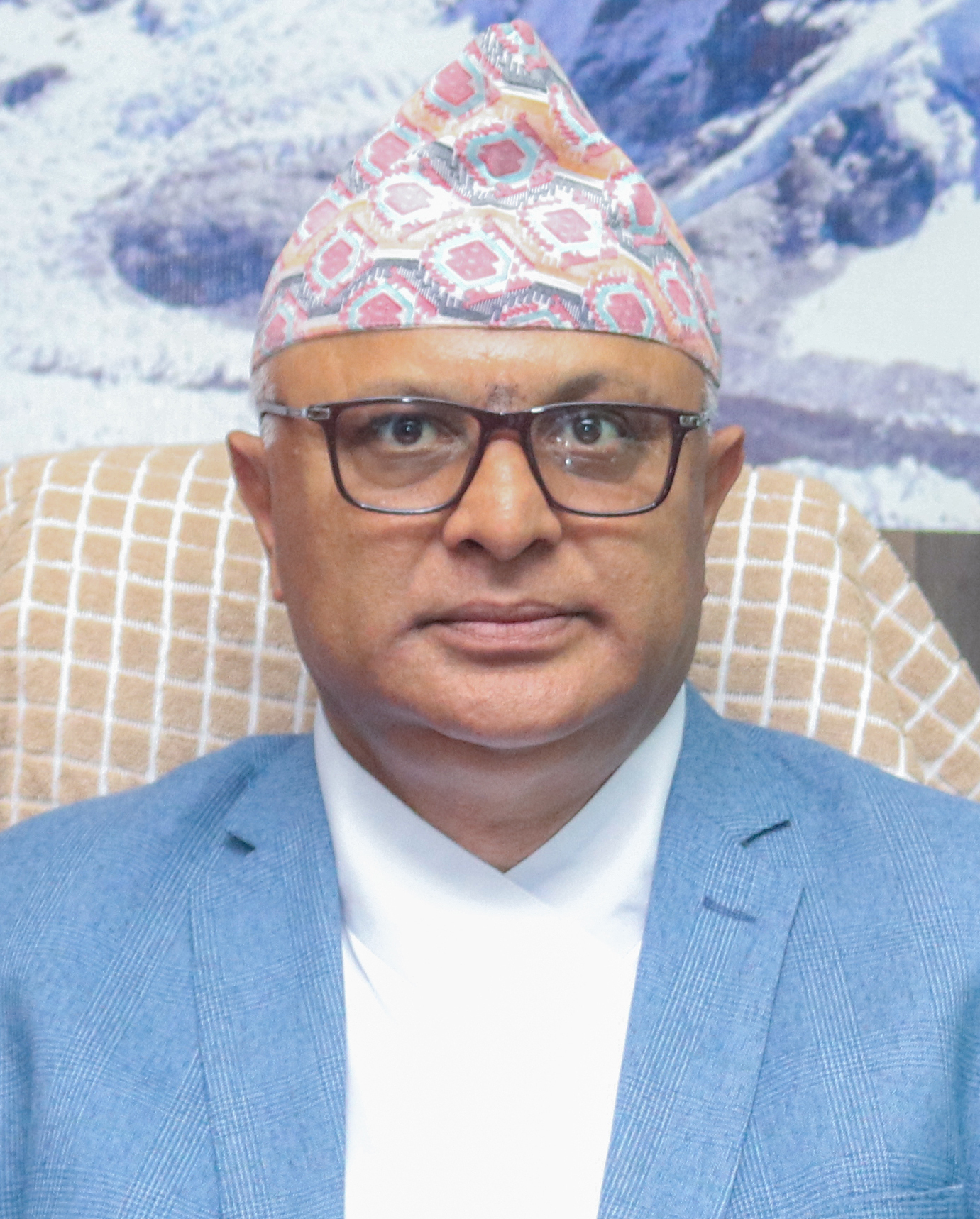
- Hon'ble Chief Minister Hikmat Kumar Karki
- Date formed: 8 September 2023
- Date dissolved: 15 October 2023

People and organisations
- Governor: Parshuram Khapung
- Chief Minister: Hikmat Kumar Karki
- No. of ministers: 10
- Member parties: CPN (UML)
- Status in legislature: Minority Government
- Opposition party: Nepali Congress
- Opposition leader: Uddhav Thapa, (NC)

History
- Election: 2022
- Legislature term: 5 years
- Predecessor: Second Uddhav Thapa cabinet
- Successor: Kedar Karki cabinet

The Second Hikmat Karki cabinet was the 7th provincial government of Koshi Province. It was formed after Hikmat Kumar Karki was sworn in as Chief Minister of Koshi Province on 8 September 2023 as previous Chief minister, Uddhav Thapa–led governments was unconstitutional.

== History ==
=== Formation ===
On September 7, the Supreme Court ordered Koshi’s Provincial governor to appoint CPN-UML’s koshi provincial assembly leader Karki the chief minister of the province, declaring the July 27 vote of confidence secured by Nepali Congress’s Uddhav Thapa as unconstitutional.

The top court had issued the mandamus order to appoint Karki as chief minister within 48 hours as per Article 168(3) that paves the way for forming a government led by the leader of the largest party in the assembly. With 40 seats in the 93 members assembly, the UML is the largest party in the province.

=== Resignation ===
Karki announced his resignation as chief minister of Koshi Province on October 7. He registered a vote of confidence in the koshi provincial assembly Secretariat on October 4, according to Article 168, Clause 3 of the Constitution. However, seeing that there is no possibility of a vote of confidence in assembly, he resigned from the post.

== Ministries ==
No.	Portfolio	Minister	Portrait	Political Party	Took office	Left office
Cabinet ministers
1	Chief Minister's Office: All other ministries not allocated to anyone.	Hikmat Kumar Karki		CPN (UML)	8 September 2023	14 October 2023
2	Minister for Health	Til Kumar Menyangbo Limbu		CPN (UML)	8 September 2023	14 October 2023
2	Minister for Water Supply, Irrigation and Energy	Til Kumar Menyangbo Limbu		CPN (UML)	8 September 2023	25 September 2023
3	Minister for Tourism, Forests and Environment	Panch Karna Rai		CPN (UML)	8 September 2023	14 October 2023
3	Minister for Industry, Agriculture and Cooperatives	Panch Karna Rai		CPN (UML)	8 September 2023	25 September 2023
4	Minister for Physical Infrastructure Development	Ekraj Karki		CPN (UML)	8 September 2023	14 October 2023
5	Minister for Internal Affairs and Law	Lila Ballav Adhikari		CPN (UML)	25 September 2023	14 October 2023
6	Minister for Energy, Water Resources and Irrigation	Buddhi Kumar Rajbhandari		CPN (UML)	25 September 2023	14 October 2023
State ministers
7	Minister of State for Industry, Agriculture and Cooperatives	Ram Prasad Mahato		CPN (UML)	16 August 2023	14 October 2023
8	Minister of State for Social Development	Srijana Rai		CPN (UML)	8 September 2023	14 October 2023
9	Minister of State for Economic Affairs and Planning	Niran Rai		CPN (UML)	25 September 2023	14 October 2023
