= Pradip Kumar Sunuwar =

Nepalese politician

- प्रदीपकुमार सुनुवार

Minister for Physical Infrastructure Development of Koshi Province
- Incumbent
- Assumed office 6 January 2026
- Governor: Parshuram Khapung
- Chief Minister: Hikmat Kumar Karki
- Preceded by: Bhupendra Rai

Minister for Health of Koshi Province
- In office 9 February 2024 – 9 May 2024
- Governor: Parshuram Khapung
- Chief Minister: Kedar Karki
- Preceded by: Til Kumar Menyangbo Limbu
- Succeeded by: Rajendra Karki

Minister for Water Supply, Irrigation and Energy of Koshi Province
- In office 2 August 2023 – 8 September 2023
- Governor: Parshuram Khapung
- Chief Minister: Uddhav Thapa
- Preceded by: Uddhav Thapa
- Succeeded by: Til Kumar Menyangbo Limbu

Member of the Koshi Provincial Assembly
- Incumbent
- Assumed office 26 December 2022
- Preceded by: Ambir Babu Gurung
- Constituency: Okhaldhunga 1 (A)

Personal details
- Party: Nepali Congress

Pradip Kumar Sunuwar (Nepali: प्रदीपकुमार सुनुवार) is a Nepalese politician, belonging to the Nepali Congress Party. Sunuwar currently serving as the Minister for Physical Infrastructure Development of Koshi Province. He also serves as a member of the Koshi Provincial Assembly and was elected from Okhaldhunga 1(A) constituency. Sunuwar had served as the Minister for Water Supply, Irrigation and Energy, and later as the Minister for Health of Koshi Province.
