= Bhupendra Rai =

Nepalese politician

Honourable Bhupendra Rai
- भुपेन्द्र राई

Minister for Physical Infrastructure Development of Koshi Province
- In office 13 September 2024 – 6 January 2026
- Governor: Parshuram Khapung
- Chief Minister: Hikmat Kumar Karki
- Preceded by: Ganesh Prasad Upreti
- Succeeded by: Pradip Kumar Sunuwar

Minister for Health of Koshi Province
- In office 24 October 2024 – 6 January 2026
- Governor: Parshuram Khapung
- Chief Minister: Hikmat Kumar Karki
- Preceded by: Rajendra Karki
- Succeeded by: Man Bahadur Limbu

Member of the Koshi Provincial Assembly
- Incumbent
- Assumed office 26 December 2022
- Preceded by: Ram Kumar Rai
- Constituency: Khotang 1(B)

Personal details
- Born: 29 June 1978 (age 47) Yamkhya, Khotang, Kingdom of Nepal
- Party: Nepali Congress

Bhupendra Rai (Nepali: भुपेन्द्र राई) is a Nepalese politician who had served as the Minister for Physical Infrastructure Development of Koshi Province from 2024 to 2026, and was addition appointed as the Minister for Health on 2024 to 2026.

He is also serving as a member of the Koshi Provincial Assembly. In the 2022 Nepalese provincial election, he won the election from Khotang 1(B) (constituency). Rai is also serving as a general secretary of the Nepali Congress, Koshi Province. He was elected general secretary in the 14th general convention of Nepali Congress. Rai had served as the chief whip of the Nepali Congress party and also the former chairperson of the Diprung Rural Municipality.
