= Rajendra Karki =

Nepalese politician

Rajendra Kumar Karki
- राजेन्द्र कार्की

Minister for Health of Koshi Province
- In office 17 May 2024 – 26 July 2024
- Governor: Parshuram Khapung
- Chief Minister: Hikmat Kumar Karki
- Preceded by: Pradip Kumar Sunuwar
- Succeeded by: Bhupendra Rai

Minister for Social Development of Koshi Province
- In office 9 February 2024 – 8 April 2024
- Governor: Parshuram Khapung
- Chief Minister: Kedar Karki
- Preceded by: Buddhi Kumar Rajbhandari
- Succeeded by: Panch Karna Rai

Member of the Koshi Provincial Assembly
- Incumbent
- Assumed office 26 December 2022
- Constituency: Sankhuwasabha 1(B)

Personal details
- Party: Communist Party of Nepal (Maoist Centre)

Rajendra Karki (Nepali: राजेन्द्र कार्की) is a Nepalese politician, belonging to the Communist Party of Nepal (Maoist Centre) Party. He is currently serving as the Minister for Health in the Government of Koshi Province. Karki had served as the Minister for Social Development in Kedar Karki's cabinet from 9 February to 8 April 2024.

He is also serving as a member of the Koshi Provincial Assembly. In the 2022 Nepalese provincial election, he won the election from Sankhuwasabha 1 (B) (constituency).
