= Bhim Parajuli =

Nepali politician

- भीम पराजुली

Minister for Tourism, Forests and Environment of Koshi Province
- Incumbent
- Assumed office 6 January 2026
- Governor: Parshuram Khapung
- Chief Minister: Hikmat Kumar Karki

Member of the Koshi Provincial Assembly
- Incumbent
- Assumed office 26 December 2022
- Preceded by: Jivan Ghimire
- Constituency: Morang 4(B)

Mayor of Biratnagar
- In office 2017–2022
- Deputy: Indira Karki

Personal details
- Born: 4 August 1973 (age 52) Nepal
- Party: Nepali Congress

Bhim Parajuli (Nepali: भीम पराजुली) is a Nepalese politician, belonging to the Nepali Congress Party. Parajuli is currently serving as the Minister for Tourism, Forests and Environment of Koshi Province. He also serves as a member of the Koshi Provincial Assembly and was elected from Morang 4(B) constituency. Parajuli previously served as the mayor of Biratnagar.

== Electoral history ==
=== 2022 provincial election ===
==== Morang 4 (B) ====
Candidate	Party	Votes	%
Bhim Parajuli	Nepali Congress	11,479	36.59
Jivan Ghimire	CPN (UML)	9,691	30.89
Madhav Prasad Acharya	Rastriya Prajatantra Party	6,935	22.10
Sanjay Kumar Singh Rajpun	People's Socialist Party, Nepal	1,460	4.65
Others		1,811	5.77
Total		31,376	100.00
Majority		1,788	
Nepali Congress			
Source: Election Commission
