= Bidur Kumar Lingthep =

Nepali politician

Honourable Bidur Kumar Lingthep
- विदुर कुमार लिङ्थेप

Minister for Economic Affairs and Planning of Koshi Province
- Incumbent
- Assumed office 6 January 2026
- Governor: Parshuram Khapung
- Chief Minister: Kedar Karki
- Preceded by: Ram Bahadur Ranamagar

Member of the Koshi Provincial Assembly
- Incumbent
- Assumed office 26 December 2022
- Preceded by: Tulsi Prasad Neupane

Mayor of Madi Municipality
- In office 2017–2022
- Deputy: Urmila Subedi
- Preceded by: Position established
- Succeeded by: Jivan Lingthep
- Constituency: Sankhuwasabha 1(B)

Personal details
- Born: 7 January 1977 (age 49) Sankhuwasabha District, Nepal
- Party: Communist Party of Nepal (Unified Marxist-Leninist) (before 2018; since 2021)
- Other political affiliations: Nepal Communist Party (2018–2021)
- Spouse: Laxmi Maya Subba

Bidur Kumar Lingthep (Nepali: विदुर कुमार लिङ्थेप) is a Nepalese politician, belonging to the Communist Party of Nepal (Unified Marxist–Leninist) Party. Lingthep is currently serving as the Minister for Economic Affairs and Planning of Koshi Province since January 2026.

He is also serving as a member of the Koshi Provincial Assembly. In the 2022 Nepalese provincial election, he won the election from Sankhuwasabha 1(B) (constituency). Lingthep had served as the chief whip of the CPN (UML) party in the Provincial Assembly and also the former mayor of Madi Municipality, Sankhuwasabha.

== Electoral history ==
=== 2022 provincial election ===
==== Sankhuwasabha 1(B) ====
Candidate	Party	Votes	%
Bidur Kumar Lingthep	CPN (UML)	15,482	46.84
Sarita Thapa	CPN (Unified Socialist)	15,243	46.12
Others		2,326	7.04
Total		33,051	100.00
Majority		239	
CPN (UML)			
Source: Election Commission
