= Buddhi Kumar Rajbhandari =

Nepalese politician

- बुद्धी कुमार राजभण्डारी

Minister for Water Supply, Irrigation and Energy of Koshi Province
- In office 25 September 2023 – 14 October 2023
- Governor: Parshuram Khapung
- Chief Minister: Hikmat Kumar Karki
- Preceded by: Til Kumar Menyangbo Limbu
- Succeeded by: Narayan Bahadur Burja Magar

Minister for Tourism, Forests and Environment of Koshi Province
- In office 7 June 2023 – 7 July 2023
- Governor: Parshuram Khapung
- Chief Minister: Hikmat Kumar Karki
- Preceded by: Jivan Acharya
- Succeeded by: Panch Karna Rai

Minister for Social Development of Koshi Province
- In office 13 January 2023 – 7 July 2023
- Governor: Parshuram Khapung
- Chief Minister: Hikmat Kumar Karki
- Preceded by: Rajan Rai
- Succeeded by: Rajendra Karki

Member of the Koshi Provincial Assembly
- Incumbent
- Assumed office 5 February 2018
- Preceded by: Constituency established
- Constituency: Solukhumbu 1 (B)

Personal details
- Party: Communist Party of Nepal (Unified Marxist-Leninist)

Buddhi Kumar Rajbhandari (Nepali: बुद्धी कुमार राजभण्डारी) is a Nepalese politician and member of the CPN (Unified Marxist-Leninist) party. He serving as the Minister for Water Supply, Irrigation and Energy in the Government of Koshi Province. Rajbhandari is a member of the Koshi Provincial Assembly having been elected from Solukhumbu 1 (B).

He had served as the Minister for Social Development, Minister for Tourism, Forests and Environment in the Government of Koshi Province.
