= Indira Thapa =

Nepalese politician

Honourable Indira Thapa
- इन्दिरा थापा

Minister of State for Economic Affairs and Planning of Koshi Province
- In office 9 February 2024 – 9 May 2024
- Governor: Parshuram Khapung
- Chief Minister: Kedar Karki
- Preceded by: Niran Rai

Member of the Koshi Provincial Assembly
- Incumbent
- Assumed office 26 December 2022

Personal details
- Born: Urlabari, Morang District
- Party: Nepali Congress

Indira Thapa (Nepali: इन्दिरा थापा) is a Nepalese politician and member of the Nepali Congress Party. Thapa is currently serving as the Minister of State for Economic Affairs and Planning of Koshi Province since 9 February 2024. She is currently serving as a member of the 2nd Koshi Provincial Assembly. In the 2022 Nepalese provincial election she was elected as a proportional representative from the Khas people category.
