= Leader of the Opposition in the Koshi Provincial Assembly =

Parliamentary position in Koshi, Nepal

Leader of the Opposition
- कोशी प्रदेशसभामा विपक्षी दलका नेता
- Incumbent; Indra Bahadur Angbo since 13 September 2024
- Style: The Honourable
- Type: Leader of the Opposition
- Status: Head of the opposition party
- Member of: Koshi Provincial Assembly
- Appointer: While parliamentary party leader of the largest political party in the Koshi Provincial Assembly that is not in government
- Inaugural holder: Rajiv Koirala
- Deputy: Deputy Leader of the Opposition

The Leader of the Opposition (Nepali: विपक्षी नेता) is an elected member of the Koshi Provincial Assembly who is leads the official opposition in the house of the Koshi Provincial Assembly. The leader of the opposition is the Provincial speaker of the party with the most seats after the government party. The Leader of the Opposition in Koshi Provincial Assembly is the parliament party leader of the provincial assembly's second largest political party. The post is held by Indra Bahadur Angbo.

== List ==
No.	Portrait	Name Constituency	Term of office		Assembly (election)	Chief Minister's	Ref
1		Rajiv Koirala; MPA for Sunsari 2(B)	February 20, 2018	November 1, 2021	1st (2017)	Sher Dhan Rai; Bhim Acharya	
2		Bhim Acharya; MPA for Sunsari 1(B)	November 2, 2021	September 18, 2022	1st (2017)	Rajendra Kumar Rai	
3		Uddhav Thapa; List MPA	January 9, 2023	July 7, 2023	2nd (2022)	Hikmat Kumar Karki	
4		Hikmat Kumar Karki; MPA for Jhapa 5(A)	July 7, 2023	September 8, 2023	2nd (2022)	Uddhav Thapa	
(3)		Uddhav Thapa; List MPA	September 8, 2023	October 15, 2023	2nd (2022)	Hikmat Kumar Karki	
5		Bhakti Prasad Sitaula; MPA for Jhapa 4(B)	October 18, 2023	November 3, 2023	2nd (2022)	Kedar Karki	
(4)		Hikmat Kumar Karki; MPA for Jhapa 5(A)	November 3, 2023	May 9, 2024	2nd (2022)	Kedar Karki	
(3)		Uddhav Thapa; List MPA	May 9, 2024	September 13, 2024	2nd (2022)	Hikmat Kumar Karki	
6		Indra Bahadur Angbo; MPA for Panchthar 1(B)	September 13, 2024	Incumbent	2nd (2022)	Hikmat Kumar Karki	

== Deputy Leader of the Opposition ==
The Deputy Leader of the Opposition (Nepali: विपक्षी दलकाे उपनेता) is also an elected member of the Provincial Assembly. The Deputy Leader of the Opposition is largely contingent, coming into play only when the Leader of the Opposition is absent from the House or is on leave. At that point the Deputy Leader is referred to as Acting Leader of the Opposition. The role is currently vacant.

No.	Portrait	Name Constituency	Term of office		Assembly (election)	Leader(s)	Ref
1		Himal Karki; MPA for Udayapur 1(B)	January 9, 2023	July 7, 2023	2nd (2022)	Uddhav Thapa	
2		Ram Bahadur Ranamagar; MPA for Ilam 2(B)	July 7, 2023	September 8, 2023	2nd (2022)	Hikmat Kumar Karki	
(1)		Himal Karki; MPA for Udayapur 1(B)	September 8, 2023	October 15, 2023	2nd (2022)	Uddhav Thapa	

== See also ==
- Speaker of the Koshi Provincial Assembly
- Deputy Speaker of the Koshi Provincial Assembly
