= Ek Raj Karki =

Nepalese politician

Honourable Ek Raj Karki
- एकराज कार्की

Minister for Water Supply, Irrigation and Energy of Koshi Province
- In office 17 May 2024 – 6 January 2026
- Governor: Parshuram Khapung
- Chief Minister: Hikmat Kumar Karki
- Preceded by: Narayan Bahadur Burja Magar
- Succeeded by: Tilchan Pathak

Minister for Physical Infrastructure Development of Koshi Province
- In office 8 September 2023 – 14 October 2023
- Governor: Parshuram Khapung
- Chief Minister: Hikmat Kumar Karki
- Preceded by: Kamal Prasad Jabegu
- Succeeded by: Kamal Prasad Jabegu

Member of the Koshi Provincial Assembly
- Incumbent
- Assumed office 5 February 2018
- Constituency: Jhapa 2(A)

Personal details
- Born: 2 November 1961 (age 64) Nepal
- Party: Communist Party of Nepal (Unified Marxist–Leninist)
- Other political affiliations: Nepal Communist Party

Ek Raj Karki (Nepali: एकराज कार्की) is a Nepalese politician, belonging to the Communist Party of Nepal (Unified Marxist–Leninist) Party. Karki is currently serving as the Minister for Water Supply, Irrigation and Energy of Koshi Province. He also serves as a member of the Koshi Provincial Assembly and was elected from Jhapa 2(A) constituency. Karki had served as Minister for Physical Infrastructure Development of Koshi Province.
