= Chief Minister of Koshi Province =

Head of Koshi Province government

- कोशी प्रदेशका मुख्यमन्त्री
- Incumbent; Hikmat Kumar Karki since 9 May 2024
- Chief Minister's Office; Government of Koshi Province
- Style: Honorable; Mr. Chief Minister
- Status: Head of Government
- Abbreviation: CMO
- Member of: Provincial Assembly; Cabinet
- Appointer: Governor
- Term length: Until majority confidence retained in provincial assembly Assembly term is 5 years unless dissolved earlier; No term limits
- Formation: 2018 (8 years ago)
- First holder: Sher Dhan Rai
- Salary: रु. - 61,000
- Website: Official website

The Chief Minister of the Koshi Province is the head of government of Koshi Province. The chief minister is appointed by the governor of the province according to Article 167 of the Constitution of Nepal. The chief minister remains in office for five years or until the provincial assembly is dissolved, and is subject to no term limits, given that they have the confidence of the assembly.

The current chief minister is CPN (UML)'s Hikmat Kumar Karki, in office since 9 May 2024.

== Qualification ==
The Constitution of Nepal sets the qualifications required to become eligible for the office of chief minister. A chief minister must meet the qualifications to become a member of the provincial assembly.

A member of the provincial assembly must be:

- a citizen of Nepal
- a voter of the concerned province
- of 25 years of age or more
- not convicted of any criminal offense
- not disqualified by any law
- not holding any office of profit

In addition to this, the chief minister must be the parliamentary party leader of the party with the majority seats in the provincial assembly. If no party has a majority, the chief minister must have a majority in the assembly with the support from other parties. If within thirty days of the election, a chief minister is not appointed as such, or fails to obtain a vote of confidence from the assembly, the parliamentary party leader of the party with the most seats in the assembly is appointed chief minister. If the chief minister such appointed fails to obtain a vote of confidence in the assembly, any assembly member who can command a majority in the floor, irrespective of party allegiance, is appointed chief minister. If this chief minister also fails to obtain a vote of confidence, the governor dissolves the assembly and fresh elections are called.

== List of chief ministers of Koshi province ==
No.	Portrait	Name Constituency (lifespan)	Term of office			Assembly (election)	Political party	Cabinet	Ref.
No.	Portrait	Name Constituency (lifespan)	Assumed office	Left office	Time in office	Assembly (election)	Political party	Cabinet	Ref.
1		Sher Dhan Rai; MPA for Bhojpur 1 (B) (born 1971)	14 February 2018	26 August 2021	3 years, 193 days	1st (2017)	CPN (UML)	S. D. Rai	
2		Bhim Acharya; MPA for Sunsari 1 (B) (born 1959)	26 August 2021	1 November 2021	67 days	1st (2017)	CPN (UML)	Acharya	
3		R. K. Rai; MPA for Bhojpur 1 (A) (born 1970)	2 November 2021	9 January 2023	1 year, 68 days	1st (2017)	CPN (Unified Socialist)	R. Rai	
4		Hikmat Kumar Karki; MPA for Jhapa 5 (A) (born 1964)	9 January 2023	7 July 2023	179 days	2nd (2022)	CPN (UML)	H. K. Karki I	
5		Uddhav Thapa; List MPA (born 1958)	7 July 2023	2 August 2023	26 days	2nd (2022)	Nepali Congress	Thapa I	
5		Uddhav Thapa; List MPA (born 1958)	2 August 2023	8 September 2023	37 days	2nd (2022)	Nepali Congress	Thapa II	
(4)		Hikmat Kumar Karki; MPA for Jhapa 5 (A) (born 1964)	8 September 2023	15 October 2023	37 days	2nd (2022)	CPN (UML)	H. K. Karki II	
6		Kedar Karki; MPA for Morang 6 (B) (born 1974)	15 October 2023	9 May 2024	207 days	2nd (2022)	Nepali Congress	K. Karki	
(4)		Hikmat Kumar Karki; MPA for Jhapa 5 (A) (born 1964)	9 May 2024	Incumbent	2 years, 175 days	2nd (2022)	CPN (UML)	H. K. Karki III	

== See also ==
- Governor of Koshi Province
- Speaker of the Koshi Provincial Assembly
- Leader of the Opposition in the Koshi Provincial Assembly
