= Ambir Babu Gurung =

Nepalese politician

- अम्बिरबाबु गुरुङ

Member of the Koshi Provincial Assembly
- In office 5 February 2018 – September 2022
- Preceded by: Constituency created
- Succeeded by: Pradip Kumar Sunuwar
- Constituency: Okhaldhunga 1 (A)

Personal details
- Born: January 1, 1966 (age 60) Okhaldhunga District, Nepal
- Party: Communist Party of Nepal (Unified Marxist-Leninist)

Ambir Babu Gurung (Nepali: अम्बिरबाबु गुरुङ) is a Nepalese politician and member of the Communist Party of Nepal (Unified Marxist-Leninist) party. He has served as the Minister for Physical Infrastructure Development and Minister of State for Physical Infrastructure Development in Sher Dhan Rai's cabinet.

Gurung also serves as a member of the Koshi Provincial Assembly and was elected from Okhaldhung 1 (A) constituency. In the 2022 Nepalese provincial election, he was defeated by the Nepali Congress candidate Pradip Kumar Sunuwar.
