= Durga Prasad Chapagain =

Nepalese politician

- दुर्गाप्रसाद चापागाई

Minister for Physical Infrastructure Development of Koshi Province
- In office 5 March 2023 – 7 June 2023
- Governor: Parshuram Khapung
- Chief Minister: Hikmat Kumar Karki
- Preceded by: Himself (Note: as Minister for Road Infrastructure and Urban Development)
- Succeeded by: Bhakti Prasad Sitaula

Minister for Road Infrastructure and Urban Development of Koshi Province
- In office 13 January 2023 – 5 March 2023
- Governor: Parshuram Khapung
- Chief Minister: Hikmat Kumar Karki
- Preceded by: Himal Karki
- Succeeded by: Himself (Note: as Minister for Physical Infrastructure Development)

Member of the Koshi Provincial Assembly
- Incumbent
- Assumed office 26 December 2022
- Preceded by: Tejman Kandangwa
- Constituency: Tehrathum 1 (A)

Personal details
- Born: 29 September 1982 (age 43) Nepal
- Party: Communist Party of Nepal (Maoist Centre)

Durga Prasad Chapagain (Nepali: दुर्गा प्रसाद चापागाई) is a Nepalese politician and member of the CPN (Maoist Centre) party. He is also serving as a member of the Koshi Provincial Assembly. In the 2022 Nepalese provincial election, he won the election from Tehrathum 1 (A) constituency.

Chapagain had previously served as the Minister for Road Infrastructure and Urban Development in the Government of Koshi Province starting from January 2023. The name of his ministry was changed to Ministry of Physical Infrastructure Development in March 2023, following the ministry's name change, his title was changed to Minister for Physical Infrastructure Development.
