= Sheila Dixit Karki =

Nepalese politician

Honourable Sheila Dixit Karki
- शीला दीक्षित कार्की

Member of the Koshi Provincial Assembly
- Incumbent
- Assumed office 26 December 2022

Personal details
- Party: Communist Party of Nepal (Unified Marxist–Leninist)
- Other party: Nepal Communist Party

Sheila Dixit Karki (Nepali: शीला दीक्षित कार्की) is a Nepalese politician, belonging to the Communist Party of Nepal (Unified Marxist–Leninist). She is currently serving as a member of the 2nd Koshi Provincial Assembly. In the 2022 Nepalese provincial election she was elected as a proportional representative from the Khas people category.
