= Ambar Bahadur Bista =

Nepalese politician

Honourable Ambar Bahadur Bista
- अम्बर बहादुर विष्ट

Speaker of the Koshi Provincial Assembly
- Incumbent
- Assumed office 9 January 2024
- Governor: Parshuram Khapung
- Chief Minister: Kedar Karki; Hikmat Kumar Karki
- Deputy: Sirjana Danuwar
- Preceded by: Baburam Gautam

Member of the Koshi Provincial Assembly
- Incumbent
- Assumed office 26 December 2022

Personal details
- Party: Rastriya Prajatantra Party

Ambar Bahadur Bista (Nepali: अम्बर बहादुर विष्ट) is a Nepalese politician, belonging to the Rastriya Prajatantra Party. He is currently serving as a member of the 2nd Koshi Provincial Assembly. In the 2022 Nepalese provincial election he was elected as a proportional representative from the Khas people category.

Bista was elected Speaker of the Koshi Province Assembly, announced by Srijana Danuwar during the Provincial Assembly meeting in Biratnagar on January 9, 2024.
