= Bandana Jhangad =

Nepalese politician

Honourable Bananda Jhangad
- बन्दना झाँगर

Member of the Koshi Provincial Assembly
- Incumbent
- Assumed office 26 December 2022

Personal details
- Born: Nepal
- Party: Communist Party of Nepal (Maoist Centre)

Bananda Jhangad (Nepali: बन्दना झाँगर) is a Nepalese politician, belonging to the Communist Party of Nepal (Maoist Centre) Party. Jhangad serving as the Minister of State for Tourism, Forests and Environment in the Government of Koshi Province. She is currently serving as a member of the 2nd Koshi Provincial Assembly. In the 2022 Nepalese provincial election she was elected as a proportional representative from the Indigenous people category.
