= Bidya Chamling Rai =

Nepalese politician

Honourable Bidya Chamling Rai
- विद्या चाम्लिङ राई

Koshi Provincial Assembly member
- Incumbent
- Assumed office 2022
- Preceded by: N/A
- Constituency: Party list

Personal details
- Party: CPN (Unified Socialist)
- Occupation: Politician

Bidya Chamling Rai (Nepali: विद्या चाम्लिङ राई) is a Nepalese politician and a member of the Provincial Assembly of Koshi Province from CPN (Unified Socialist). She was elected via 2022 Nepalese provincial elections from CPN (Unified Socialist) party list.
