= Deputy Speaker of the Koshi Provincial Assembly =

- कोशी प्रदेशसभाका उपसभामुख
- Seal of Koshi Province
- Incumbent; Sirjana Danuwar since 14 January 2023
- Koshi Provincial Assembly
- Style: Honourable
- Member of: Koshi Provincial Assembly
- Nominator: Party offices
- Appointer: Members of the Koshi Provincial Assembly
- Term length: During the life of the Pradesh Sabha (five years maximum)
- Constituting instrument: Constitution of Nepal
- Inaugural holder: Saraswoti Pokhrel
- Formation: 15 February 2018 (8 years ago)
- Salary: रु. 45,000

The Deputy Speaker of the Koshi Provincial Assembly is subordinate to the speaker of the Koshi Provincial Assembly. They are responsible for the Koshi Provincial Assembly and the second highest ranking provincial officer of the Koshi Provincial Assembly. They act as the presiding officer in case of leave or absence caused by death or illness of the Speaker of the Koshi Provincial Assembly. The deputy speaker is chosen from sitting members of the Koshi Provincial Assembly. The deputy speaker can be removed from office by a resolution passed in the assembly by an effective majority of its members.

== Qualification ==
The Constitution of Nepal sets the qualifications required to become eligible for the office of the Speaker and Deputy Speaker. A Speaker and Deputy Speaker must meet the qualifications to become a member of the provincial assembly. A member of the provincial assembly must be:

(a) One who is a citizen of Nepal;

(b) One who is a voter of the concerned Province;

(c) One who has completed the age of twenty-five years;

(d) One who is not convicted of a criminal offense involving moral turpitude;

(e) One who is not disqualified by any law; and

(f) One who is not holding any office of profit.

== Removal ==
"Speaker and Deputy Speaker of the Provincial Assembly shall fall vacant in any of the following circumstances:

(a) "In case he or she ceases to be a member of the Provincial Assembly;
Provided that, in the event of the dissolution of the Provincial Assembly, the Speaker of Province and the Deputy Speaker holding their respective offices shall continue in office until the previous day of the filing of nominations for another election to the Provincial Assembly;

(b) "In case he or she tenders resignation in writing;

(c) "In case a resolution is adopted by a majority of two-thirds of the total number of the then members of the Provincial Assembly to the effect that his or her conduct is not compatible with his or her office."

== List ==
N°	Speaker		Term of office			Assembly (election)	Party	Ref
N°	Portrait	Name	Took office	Left office	Term	Assembly (election)	Party	Ref
1		Saraswati Pokharel	February 15, 2018	September 25, 2022	4 years, 222 days	1st (2017)	CPN (Maoist Centre)	
2		Sirjana Danuwar	January 14, 2023	Incumbent	3 years, 236 days	2nd (2023)	CPN (Unified Marxist–Leninist)	

== See also ==
- Deputy Speaker of the Karnali Provincial Assembly
