= Shamsher Rai =

Nepalese politician (born 1972)

Honourable Shamsher Rai
- शमशेर राई

Minister for Internal Affairs and Law
- In office 15 October 2023 – 9 May 2024
- Governor: Parshuram Khapung
- Chief Minister: Kedar Karki
- Preceded by: Lila Ballabh Adhikari
- Succeeded by: Lila Ballabh Adhikari

Member of the Koshi Provincial Assembly
- Incumbent
- Assumed office 26 December 2022
- Preceded by: Kaji Man Kagate
- Constituency: Ilam 1(B)

Personal details
- Born: 1972 (age 53–54) Ilam District, Nepal
- Party: Nepali Congress

Shamsher Rai (Nepali: शमशेर राई) is a Nepalese politician and member of the Nepali Congress Party. He serving as the Minister for Internal Affairs and Law of Koshi Province. He also serves as a member of the Koshi Provincial Assembly and was elected from Ilam 1 (B) constituency.

== Electoral history ==
=== 2022 provincial elections ===
==== Ilam 1(B) ====
| Candidate | Party | Votes | % |
|---|---|---|---|
| Shamsher Rai | Nepali Congress | 12,780 | 45.04 |
| Dipak Kumar Thebe | CPN (UML) | 12,142 | 42.79 |
| Prem Kumar Tamang | Mongol National Organisation | 1,356 | 4.78 |
| Rajendra Kumar Lamichhane | Rastriya Prajatantra Party | 1,281 | 4.51 |
| Others | 817 | 2.88 | |
| Total | | 28,376 | 100.00 |
| Majority | | 638 | |
| Nepali Congress | | | |
Source: Election Commission
