= Biratnagar High Court =

High Court at Nepal

- 26.4596149°N 87.2870891°E
- Jurisdiction: Koshi province
- Location: Biratnagar
- Coordinates: 26.4596149°N 87.2870891°E
- Composition method: Presidential with referral of Chief Justice of Nepal
- Authorised by: Government of Nepal
- Language: Nepali
- Website: supremecourt.gov.np/court/biratnagarhc

Chief Justice
- Currently: Shri Ramesh Prasad Rajbhandari

Biratnagar High Court is the provincial court and High Court located in Biratnagar. The High Court can initiate a contempt of court case and punish according to the law against anyone obstructing its or its subordinate court’s act of judicial execution or not abiding by its order or verdict.

== Appointment of Chief Judge ==
Chief Judge is appointed by Honourable chief Justice of Nepal on recommendations of judicial council.

== Judges ==
S.N.	Designation	Name
1	Honourable Permanent Chief Justice	Satya Mohan Joshi Tharu
2	Honourable Judge	Ramesh Prasad Rajbhandari
3	Honourable Judge	Dinesh Prasad Yadav
4	Honourable Judge	Bipul Neupane
5	Honourable Judge	Krishna Kamal Adhikari
6	Honourable Judge	Ganesh Prasad Baral
7	Honourable Judge	Mamata Khanal
8	Honourable Judge	Sridhara Kumari Pudasaini
9	Honourable Judge	Ritesh Thapa
