= Rewati Raman Bhandari =

Nepali politician

- Incumbent
- Assumed office 2013
- Constituency: Sunsari-2

Personal details
- Party: Communist Party of Nepal (Unified Marxist-Leninist)
- Occupation: Lawyer

Rewati Raman Bhandari (Nepali: रेवती रमण भण्डारी) is a member of 2nd Nepalese Constituent Assembly. He won Sunsari–2 seat in 2013 Nepalese Constituent Assembly election from Communist Party of Nepal (Unified Marxist-Leninist).
