= Bhim Acharya =

Member of House of Representatives of Nepal

- भिम आचार्य

Chief Minister of Koshi Province
- In office 26 August 2021 – 1 November 2021
- Governor: Somnath Adhikari
- Preceded by: Sher Dhan Rai
- Succeeded by: Rajendra Kumar Rai
Other senior positions
Minister for Culture, Tourism and Civil Aviation
In office 25 February 2014 – 13 September 2014
President	Ram Baran Yadav
Prime Minister	Sushil Koirala
Vice President	Paramananda Jha
Succeeded by	Deepak Chandra Amatya
Leader of the Opposition in the Koshi Provincial Assembly
In office 2 November 2021 – 2 September 2022
President	Bidhya Devi Bhandari
Governor	Somnath Adhikari Pyasi
Preceded by	Rajiv Koirala
Succeeded by	Uddhav Thapa
Leader of the House in the Koshi Provincial Assembly
In office 26 August 2021 – 1 November 2021
Governor	Somnath Adhikari
Preceded by	Sher Dhan Rai
Succeeded by	Rajendra Kumar Rai
Parliamentary offices
Member of Parliament, Pratinidhi Sabha
In office 22 December 2022 – 12 September 2025
Preceded by	Sitaram Mahato
Succeeded by	Lal Bikram Thapa
Constituency	Sunsari 2
Member of Koshi Provincial Assembly
In office 5 February 2018 – September 2022
Preceded by	Constituency created
Succeeded by	Bijay Kumar Rai
Constituency	Sunsari 1(B)
Member of 1st and 2nd Nepalese Constituent Assembly
In office 28 May 2008 – 14 October 2017
Preceded by	Constituency established
Succeeded by	Constituency abolished
Constituency	Sunsari 6

Personal details
- Born: April 27, 1959 (age 67) Toliya–6, Dhankuta
- Party: CPN (UML)
- Spouse: Nira Devi Khanal Acharya
- Parent(s): Bala Prasad Acharya (Father); Laxmi Devi Acharya (Mother)

Bhim Acharya (Nepali: भिम आचार्य) secretary of Communist Party of Nepal (Unified Marxist-Leninist), is the former Chief minister of Province No. 1. Governor Somnath Adhikari appointed Bhim Acharya as the chief minister as per Article 168 (1) of the Constitution of Nepal after He was unanimously elected parliamentary party leader of the CPN (UML) on 26 August 2021, following the resignation of outgoing chief minister Sher Dhan Rai as both the parliamentary party leader and chief minister. He assumed the post of the Minister for Culture, Tourism and Civil Aviation of Nepal on 25 February 2014 under Sushil Koirala-led government.

He was a member of the 2nd Nepalese Constituent Assembly. He won the Sunsari–6 seat in 2013 Nepalese Constituent Assembly election from the Communist Party of Nepal (Unified Marxist-Leninist).

== Personal life ==
Bhim Acharya was born on 27 April 1959 in Toliya-6, Dhankuta. He is the son of Bala Prasad and Laxmi Devi Acharya. He has obtained master's degree in management.

== Political career ==
Acharya joined students movement in 1975. He joined Communist Party of Nepal (Unified Marxist-Leninist) in 1979.

He won the 2008 Nepalese Constituent Assembly election from Sunsari-6 constituency with 15,606 votes defeating Narendra Bahadur Basnet of Unified Communist Party of Nepal (Maoist). He was appointed as the Chief Whip of the Parliamentary Party of the Communist Party of Nepal (Unified Marxist-Leninist).

Bhim Acharya was elected as the leader of the CPN-UML's state-1 parliamentary party on 26 August 2021.
