= Ganesh Prasad Upreti =

Nepalese politician

Honourable Ganesh Prasad Upreti
- गणेश प्रसाद उप्रेती

Member of the Koshi Provincial Assembly
- Incumbent
- Assumed office 26 December 2022
- Constituency: Morang 2(A)

Personal details
- Born: 12 May 1978 (age 47) Nepal
- Party: Communist Party of Nepal (Maoist Centre)
- Other political affiliations: Nepal Communist Party

Ganesh Prasad Upreti (Nepali: गणेश प्रसाद उप्रेती) is a Nepalese politician, belonging to the Communist Party of Nepal (Maoist Centre) party. Upreti serving as the Minister for Physical Infrastructure Development of Koshi Province. He also serves as a member of the Koshi Provincial Assembly and was elected from Morang 2(A) constituency. Upreti had served as the Minister for Tourism, Forests, and Environment of Koshi Province.
