= Ministry of Tourism, Forests and Environment (Koshi Province) =

- पर्यटन, वन तथा वातावरण मन्त्रालय

Agency overview
- Formed: 15 February 2018; 7 years ago
- Jurisdiction: Government of Koshi Province
- Headquarters: Biratnagar, Morang District
- Minister responsible: Hikmat Kumar Karki, Cabinet Minister
- Agency executive: Bishal Ghimire, Secretary
- Website: Official website

The Ministry of Tourism, Forests and Environment is a governmental body of Koshi Province in charge of managing natural resources, promoting tourism, climate change, environment and conserving biodiversity. They maintain a delicate balance between environmental conservation and sustainable development.

== Overview ==
According to the Constitution of Nepal issued in the 2015, the basic structure of the Federal Democratic Republic of Nepal is arranged in a three-tier government structure. Koshi province is one of the seven provinces in Nepal.

After Nepal was transformed into a federal structure and the system of union, state and local government was completed in the year 2017, the three-level elections were completed and the provincial government was formed 15 February 2018. The Ministry of Industry, Tourism, Forests and Environment was established on same year. On 6 February 2022, the portfolio of the Ministry of Industry, Tourism, Forests and Environment has been split into three ministries, the Ministry of Forests Environment and Soil Conservation, Ministry of Industry, Labour and Employment and Ministry of Culture and Tourism. Recently, according to the decision of the provincial government (council of ministers) on 20 January 2023, the Ministry of Forests Environment and Soil Conservation has been modified and the name of the department has been changed to the Ministry of Tourism, Forests and Environment.

== List of former ministers ==
This is a list of all former Ministers since 2018–Present.

Jagadish Prasad Kusiyait	15 February 2018	26 August 2021
Lachhman Tiwari	26 August 2021	1 November 2021
Shekha Chandra Thapa	6 February 2022	9 November 2022
Jivan Acharya	13 January 2023	7 June 2023
Ganesh Prasad Upreti	3 November 2023	8 April 2024
