= Ministry of Water Supply, Irrigation and Energy (Koshi Province) =

Government ministry of Koshi Province in Nepal

- खानेपानी, सिंचाइ तथा उर्जा मन्त्रालय
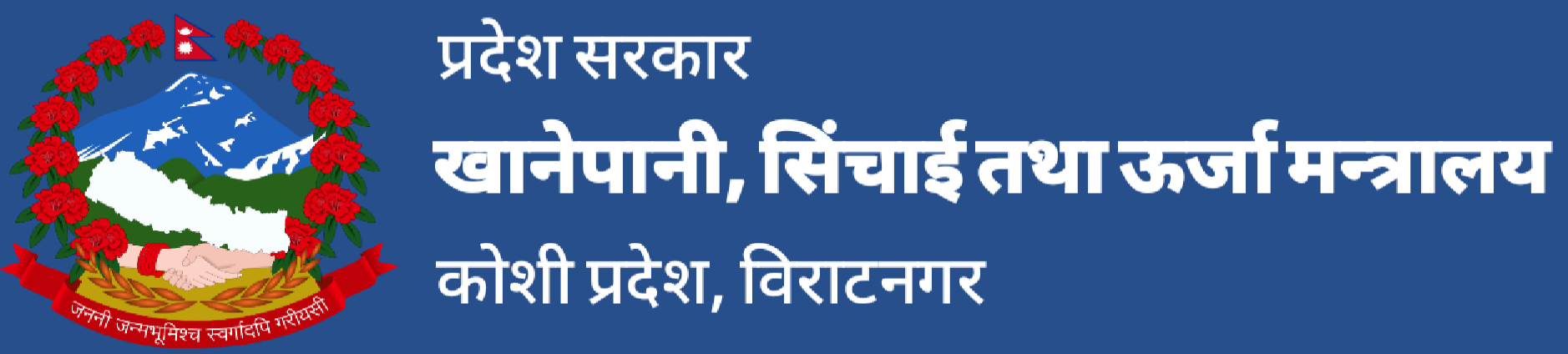
- Logo of Ministry of Water Supply, Irrigation and Energy

Agency overview
- Formed: 6 February 2022; 4 years ago
- Jurisdiction: Government of Koshi Province
- Headquarters: Biratnagar, Morang District
- Minister responsible: Tilchan Pathak
- Agency executive: Puskar Prasad Pokharel, Secretary
- Website: mowsie.koshi.gov.np

The Ministry of Water, Irrigation and Energy is the governmental body of Koshi Province, Nepal, responsible for managing drinking water, irrigation, electricity, water-borne disasters (rivers and landslides) at the Provincial level.

== Overview ==
According to the constitution of Nepal, the provinces have been established in the Federal Democratic Republic of Nepal, as provided for in the three-tier government structure. Koshi province is one of the seven provinces in Nepal. There are 14 districts: Bhojpur, Dhankuta, Ilam, Jhapa, Khotang, Morang, Okhaldhunga, Panchthar, Sankhuwasabha, Solukhumbu, Sunsari, Taplejung, Terhathum and Udayapur. There is one metropolitan city and tw sub-metropolitan cities. There are a total of 49 local levels consisting of municipalities and 88 rural municipalities.

After Nepal was transformed into a federal structure and the system of union, state and local government was completed in the year 2017, the three-level elections were completed and the provincial government was formed. The Ministry of Water Supply, Irrigation and Energy was established on 6 February 2022 with the responsibility of carrying out various works in the fields of drinking water, energy and irrigation in all the fourteen districts of Koshi Province, as specified in the division of labor regulations. Construction of drinking water plan (gravity, pumping, improvement of water quality), projects related to drainage, construction of irrigation projects, ground water resources, river control (embankment), works related to renewable energy promotion, study, research, plan formulation, approval and This ministry is carrying out the work of planning, operation and maintenance from the subordinate offices.

== List of former secretaries ==
Secretary of the Ministry of Water Supply, Irrigation and Energy
Navin Raj Singh	14 February 2022	6 August 2023
Arun Kumar Jha	7 August 2023	13 March 2024
Pradip Bantawa	14 March 2024	26 October 2025
Pushkar Prasad Pokharel	17 November 2025	Incumbent
