= Uddhav Thapa =

Nepalese politician

- उद्धव थापा

5th Chief Minister of Koshi Province
- In office 7 July 2023 – 8 September 2023
- President: Ram Chandra Poudel
- Governor: Parshuram Khapung
- Preceded by: Hikmat Kumar Karki
- Succeeded by: Hikmat Kumar Karki
Other senior positions
Leader of the Opposition in the Koshi Provincial Assembly
In office 8 September 2023 – 15 October 2023
Governor	Parshuram Khapung
Deputy	Himal Karki
Preceded by	Hikmat Kumar Karki
Succeeded by	Bhakti Prasad Sitaula
In office 9 January 2023 – 7 July 2023
Governor	Parshuram Khapung
Deputy	Himal Karki
Preceded by	Bhim Acharya
Succeeded by	Hikmat Kumar Karki
Leader of the House in the Koshi Provincial Assembly
In office 7 July 2023 – 8 September 2023
Governor	Parshuram Khapung
Deputy	Himal Karki
Preceded by	Hikmat Kumar Karki
Succeeded by	Hikmat Kumar Karki

Member of the Koshi Provincial Assembly for Nepali Congress
- Incumbent
- Assumed office 26 December 2022

Personal details
- Born: November 30, 1958 (age 67) Arjundhara, Jhapa, Nepal
- Party: Nepali Congress
- Education: Bachelor's Degree

Uddhav Thapa (Nepali: उद्धव थापा; born 30 November 1958) is a Nepalese politician, belonging to the Nepali Congress. He has served twice within a month as the chief minister of Koshi Province, from 7 July 2023 to 2 August 2023, from 2 August 2023 to 8 September 2023. Thapa was elected parliamentary party leader of the Nepali Congress on 30 December 2022. He is a member of the Koshi Provincial Assembly from Nepali Congress. In the 2022 Nepalese provincial election he was elected as a proportional representative from the Khas people category.

== Electoral history ==
=== 2017 legislative elections ===
==== Jhapa 2 ====
Candidate	Party	Votes	%
Pabitra Niraula Kharel	CPN (UML)	45,817	58.02
Uddhav Thapa	Nepali Congress	32,050	40.58
Nabin Bastola	Bibeksheel Sajha Party	1,105	1.40
Total		78,972	100.00
Valid votes		78,972	95.53
Invalid/blank votes		3,699	4.47
Total votes		82,671	100.00
Majority		13,764	
CPN (UML) hold			
Source: Election Commission

=== 2013 Constituent Assembly election ===
==== Jhapa 4 ====
Candidate	Party	Votes	%
Prem Bahadur Giri	CPN (UML)	22,159	41.61
Uddhav Thapa	Nepali Congress	20,177	37.89
Purushottam Chudal	UCPN (Maoist)	6,648	12.48
Palhad Sapkota	Rastriya Prajatantra Party Nepal	1,839	3.45
Other		2,429	4.56
Total		53,252	100.00
Majority		1,982	
CPN (UML) hold			
Source: Election Commission

Political offices
Preceded by Hikmat Kumar Karki	Chief Minister of Koshi Province; 2023–2023	Succeeded by Hikmat Kumar Karki
