= Jhapa 5 =

Parliamentary constituency in Koshi Province, Nepal

- Parliamentary constituency
- Jhapa 5 in Koshi Province
- Province: Koshi
- District: Jhapa District
- Electorate: 163,379
- Major settlements: Damak; Gauradaha; Kerkha Bazar; Chulachuli Road area; Kamal Bazaar; Gauriganj; Baigundhura; Maharani Jhoda

Current constituency
- Created: 1991
- Seats: 1
- Party: Rastriya Swatantra Party
- Member of Parliament: Balen Shah
- Local Levels: Damak Municipality; Kamal Rural Municipality; Gauradaha Municipality (wards 1–8); Gaurigunj Rural Municipality (wards 3–6)
- Koshi MPA 5(A): Hikmat Kumar Karki, CPN (UML)
- Koshi MPA 5(B): Hom Bahadur Thapa, CPN (UML)
- Koshi Provincial Assembly Seats: 2

Jhapa 5 is one of five parliamentary constituencies of Jhapa District in Nepal. This constituency came into existence on the Constituency Delimitation Commission (CDC) report submitted on 31 August 2017.

== Incorporated areas ==
Jhapa 5 incorporates Damak Municipality, Kamal Rural Municipality, wards 1–8 of Gauradaha Municipality and wards 3–6 of Gauriganj Rural Municipality.

== Assembly segments ==
It encompasses the following Province No. 1 Provincial Assembly segment

- Jhapa 5(A)
- Jhapa 5(B)

== Members of Parliament ==
=== Parliament/Constituent Assembly ===
Election	Member	Party
1991	Chandra Prakash Mainali	CPN (Unified Marxist–Leninist)
1994	Radha Krishna Mainali	CPN (Unified Marxist–Leninist)
March 1998	Radha Krishna Mainali	CPN (Marxist–Leninist)
1999	Tara Sam Yongya	CPN (Unified Marxist–Leninist)
2008	Keshav Kumar Budhathoki	Nepali Congress
2013	Keshav Kumar Budhathoki	Nepali Congress
2017	K. P. Sharma Oli	CPN (Unified Marxist–Leninist)
2022	K. P. Sharma Oli	CPN (Unified Marxist–Leninist)
2026	Balen Shah	Rastriya Swatantra Party

=== Provincial Assembly ===
==== 5(A) ====
Election	Member	Party
2017	Hikmat Kumar Karki	CPN (Unified Marxist-Leninist)
May 2018	Hikmat Kumar Karki	Nepal Communist Party
March 2021	Hikmat Kumar Karki	CPN (Unified Marxist–Leninist)
2022	Hikmat Kumar Karki	CPN (Unified Marxist–Leninist)

==== 5(B) ====
Election	Member	Party
2017	Arjun Rai	CPN (Unified Marxist-Leninist)
May 2018	Arjun Rai	Nepal Communist Party
March 2021	Arjun Rai	CPN (Unified Marxist–Leninist)
2022	Hom Bahadur Thapa	CPN (Unified Marxist–Leninist)

== Election results ==
=== Election in the 2020s ===
==== 2026 general election ====
Candidate	Party	Votes	%
Balen Shah	Rastriya Swatantra Party	68,348	66.80
KP Sharma Oli	CPN (UML)	18,734	18.31
Samir Tamang	Shram Sanskriti Party	9,233	9.02
Mandhara Chimariya	Nepali Congress	1,821	1.78
Laxmi Prasad Sangroula	Rastriya Prajatantra Party	1,536	1.50
Ranjit Tamang	Nepali Communist Party	1,461	1.43
Amrit Lal Mahto	Janamat Party	296	0.29
Sabin Rai	Rastriya Pariwartan Party	204	0.20
San Bahadur Meche	Mongol National Organisation	166	0.16
Sobha Bhandari	Independent	82	0.08
Sanjay Rai	Nepal Communist Party (Maoist)	76	0.07
Others		357	0.35
Total		102,314	100.00
Valid votes		102,314	96.04
Invalid/blank votes		4,219	3.96
Total votes		106,533	100.00
Registered voters/turnout		163,379	65.21
Majority		49,614	
Rastriya Swatantra Party gain from CPN (UML)			

==== 2022 general election ====
Candidate	Party	Votes	%
KP Sharma Oli	CPN (UML)	52,319	55.74
Khagendra Adhikari	Nepali Congress	23,743	25.29
Suresh Kumar Pokharel	Rastriya Swatantra Party	11,759	12.53
Bhim Rajbanshi	Janamat Party	1,485	1.58
Kavindra Sharma Limbu	Sanghiya Loktantrik Rastriya Manch	1,281	1.36
Others		3,283	3.50
Total		93,870	100.00
Majority		28,576	
CPN (UML) hold			

==== 2022 provincial election ====
===== 5(A) =====
Candidate	Party	Votes	%
Hikmat Kumar Karki	CPN (UML)	22,530	49.27
Jiwan Kumar Rai	Nepali Congress	17,058	37.30
Dunnilal Rajbanshi	Janamat Party	2,485	5.43
Surya Prasad Limbu	Sanghiya Loktantrik Rastriya Manch	1,650	3.61
Lachhuman Limbu	People's Socialist Party	703	1.54
Others		1,305	2.85
Total		45,731	100.00
Majority		5,472	
CPN (UML)			

===== 5(B) =====
Candidate	Party	Votes	%
Hom Bahadur Thapa	CPN (UML)	24,129	49.43
Rewatraj Puri	CPN (Maoist Centre)	17,315	35.47
Chhabilal Sitaula	Hamro Nepali Party	2,171	4.45
Dhanraj Limbu	Sanghiya Loktantrik Rastriya Manch	1,563	3.20
Sudip Rai	People's Socialist Party	994	2.04
Ramlal Rai	Mongol National Organisation	928	1.90
Dhiraj Bajracharya	Independent	701	1.44
Others		1,014	2.08
Total		48,815	100.00
Majority		6,814	
CPN (UML)			

=== Election in the 2010s ===
==== 2017 legislative elections ====
Candidate	Party	Votes	%
KP Sharma Oli	CPN (UML)	43,515	57.07
Khagendra Adhikari	Nepali Congress	26,822	35.18
Satya Dev Prasad	Federal Socialist Forum, Nepal	1,915	2.51
Gyan Bahadur Imbung Limbu	Sanghiya Loktantrik Rastriya Manch	1,380	1.81
Others		2,614	3.43
Total		76,246	100.00
Majority			
CPN (UML) gain from Nepali Congress			

==== 2017 Nepalese provincial elections ====
===== 5(A) =====
Party	Candidate	Votes
CPN (Unified Marxist–Leninist)	Hikmat Kumar Karki	24,098
Nepali Congress	Anil Krishna Prasai	18,636
Sanghiya Loktantrik Rastriya Manch	Surya Prasad Limbu	1,045
Others		1,586
Invalid votes		1,989
Result	CPN (UML) gain	
Source: Election Commission

===== 5(B) =====
Party	Candidate	Votes
CPN (Unified Marxist–Leninist)	Arjun Rai	30,973
Nepali Congress	Rajan Bahadur Dhungana	10,993
Federal Socialist Forum, Nepal	Sushil Kumar Rai	1,626
Others		3,361
Invalid votes		1,552
Result	CPN (UML) gain	
Source: Election Commission

==== 2013 Constituent Assembly election ====
Candidate	Party	Votes	%
Keshav Kumar Budhathoki	Nepali Congress	16,587	32.01
Lal Prasad Sawa Limbu	CPN (Unified Marxist–Leninist)	16,347	31.55
Jhalak Bahadur Magar	UCPN (Maoist)	9,172	17.70
Dhruba Kumar Upreti	Rastriya Prajatantra Party Nepal	3,154	6.09
Om Narayan Rajbanshi	Sadbhavana Party	1,523	2.94
Others		5,028	9.70
Total		51,811	100.00
Majority			
Nepali Congress hold			

=== Election in the 2000s ===
==== 2008 Constituent Assembly election ====
Party	Candidate	Votes
Nepali Congress	Keshav Kumar Budhathoki	16,466
CPN (Maoist)	Harka Bahadur Khadka	15,548
CPN (Unified Marxist–Leninist)	Tara Sam Yongya	13,247
Sadbhavana Party	Surya Narayan Ganesh	6,655
Madheshi Janaadhikar Forum, Nepal	Tara Nath Rajbanshi	2,601
Sanghiya Loktantrik Rastriya Manch	Lahan Singh Tumbapo	1,398
Others		2,457
Invalid votes		4,214
Result	Congress gain	
Source: Election Commission

=== Election in the 1990s ===
==== 1999 legislative elections ====
Party	Candidate	Votes
CPN (Unified Marxist–Leninist)	Tara Sam Yongya	19,199
Nepali Congress	Santosh Kumar Meinyangbo	16,651
Nepal Sadbhawana Party	Nitya Nand Tajpuriya	3,492
Rastriya Janamukti Party	Chandra Prasad Yongya	2,491
CPN (Marxist–Leninist)	Jung Prasad Chemjong	1,896
Rastriya Prajatantra Party	Laxmi Prasad Odari	1,557
Others		656
Invalid Votes		942
Result	CPN (UML) gain	
Source: Election Commission

==== 1994 legislative elections ====
Party	Candidate	Votes
CPN (Unified Marxist–Leninist)	Radha Krishna Mainali	16,361
Nepali Congress	Surya Narayan Tajpuriya	13,898
Rastriya Prajatantra Party	Shiva Kumar Yongya	4,013
Rastriya Janamukti Party	Chandra Prasad Yongya	3,043
Nepal Sadbhawana Party	Top Lal Rajbanshi	1,652
Nepal Janabadi Morcha	Kedar Nar Singh	197
Result	CPN (UML) gain	
Source: Election Commission

==== 1991 legislative elections ====
Party	Candidate	Votes
CPN (Unified Marxist–Leninist)	Chandra Prakash Mainali	18,892
Nepali Congress	Ram Babu Prasai	11,948
Result	CPN (UML) gain	

== See also ==
- List of parliamentary constituencies of Nepal
