= Kedar Karki =

Nepali politician

Honourable Kedar Karki
- केदार कार्की
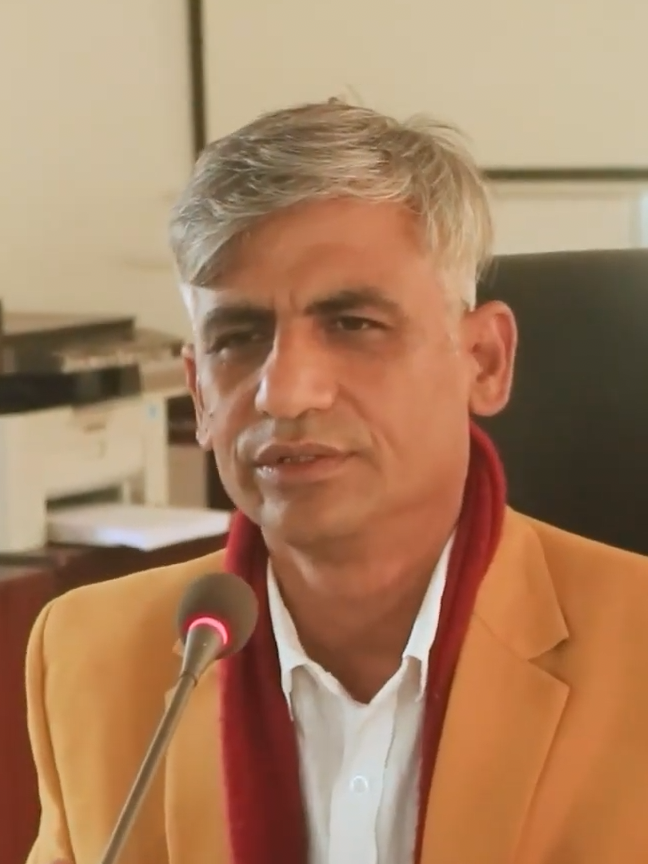
- Karki in 2023.

Chief Minister of Koshi Province
- In office 15 October 2023 – 9 May 2024
- President: Ram Chandra Poudel
- Governor: Parshuram Khapung
- Preceded by: Hikmat Kumar Karki
- Succeeded by: Hikmat Kumar Karki

Leader of the House in the Koshi Provincial Assembly
- In office 15 October 2023 – 9 May 2024
- Governor: Parshuram Khapung
- Preceded by: Hikmat Kumar Karki
- Succeeded by: Hikmat Kumar Karki

Minister for Internal Affairs and Law
- In office 2 November 2021 – 9 January 2023
- Governor: Somnath Adhikari; Parshuram Khapung
- Chief Minister: Rajendra Kumar Rai
- Preceded by: Bhim Acharya as Chief Minister
- Succeeded by: Hikmat Kumar Karki as Chief Minister

Member of the Koshi Provincial Assembly
- Incumbent
- Assumed office 5 February 2018
- Constituency: Morang 6(B)

Personal details
- Born: 22 December 1974 (age 51) Biratnagar, Morang, Nepal
- Party: Nepali Congress
- Website: https://kedarkarki.com/

Kedar Karki (Nepali: केदार कार्की) is a Nepalese politician and member of Provincial Assembly. Karki had served as the Chief Minister of Koshi Province since 15 October 2023. He is also serving as member of Koshi Provincial Assembly having been elected from Morang 6 (B).

== Political life ==
Karki started his political career as president of Nepal Student Union unit of Mahendra Morang Adarsh Multiple Campus. For the first time, he was elected as provincial assembly member from 2017 Nepalese provincial elections.Karki had served as the chief whip of the Nepali Congress party in the first term of Provincial Assembly. He has also served as Minister for Internal Affairs and Law of Province No. 1.

== Electoral history ==
=== 2022 Nepalese provincial elections ===
Morang 6(B)
Party	Candidate	Votes
Nepali Congress	Kedar Karki	10,448
CPN (Unified Marxist–Leninist)	Parshuram Basnet	9,268
Rastriya Prajatantra Party	Rajesh Kumar Maskey	2,103
Result	Congress hold	
Source: Election Commission

=== 2017 Nepalese provincial elections ===
Morang 6(B)
Party	Candidate	Votes
Nepali Congress	Kedar Karki	11,298
CPN (Unified Marxist–Leninist)	Ramesh Prasad Pokharel	8,120
Federal Socialist Forum, Nepal	Shyam Kumar Kamat	4,921
Rastriya Janata Party Nepal	Yadubamsha Shah Haluwai	1,203
Others		1,596
Invalid votes		1,532
Result	Congress gain	
Source: Election Commission

== See also ==
- Kedar Karki cabinet
