= Hikmat Kumar Karki =

Chief Minister of Koshi Province since 2024

- हिक्मत कुमार कार्की
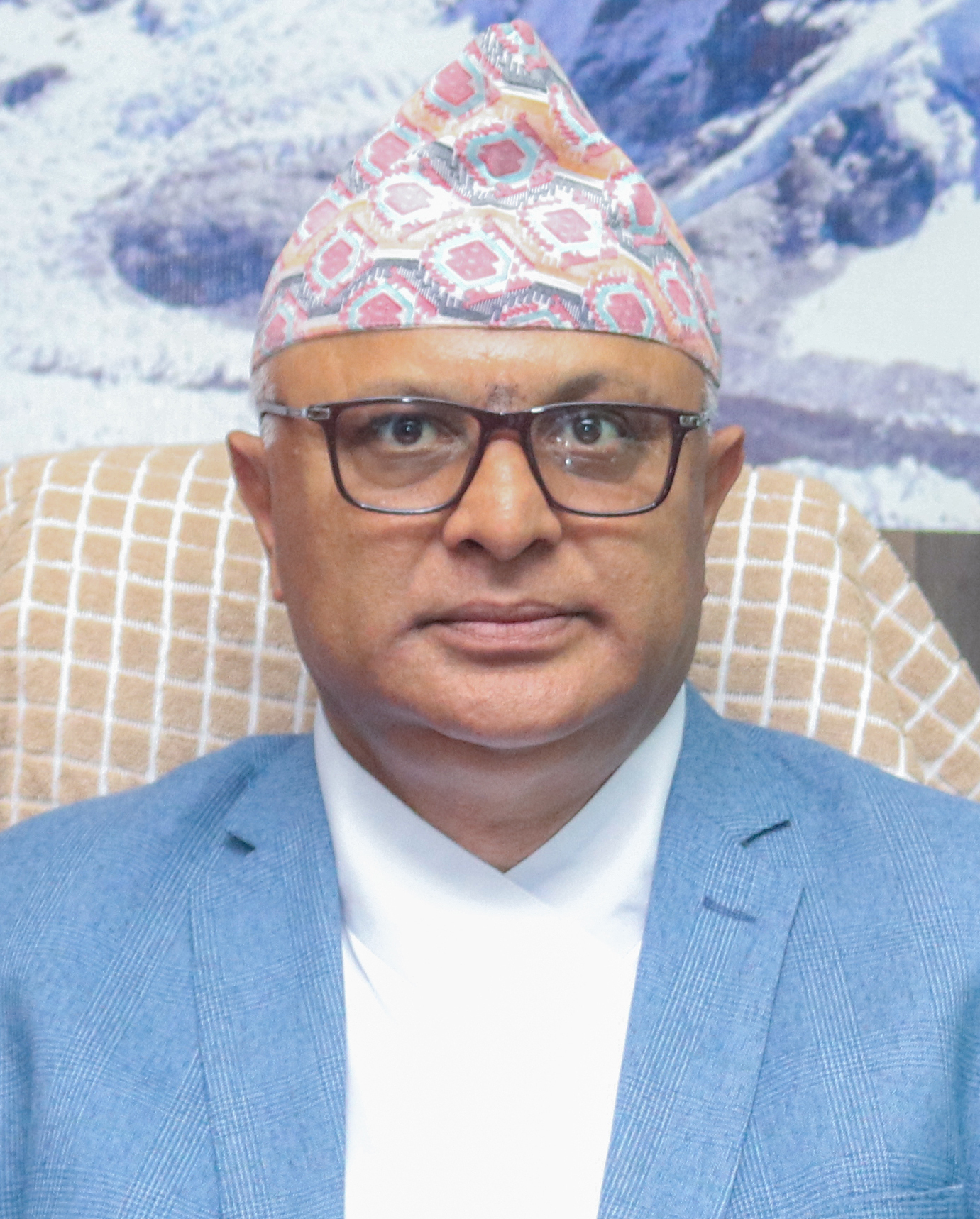
- Official portrait, 2023

Chief Minister of Koshi Province
- Incumbent
- Assumed office 9 May 2024
- Governor: Parshuram Khapung
- Cabinet: Karki III
- Preceded by: Kedar Karki
- In office 8 September 2023 – 14 October 2023
- Governor: Parshuram Khapung
- Cabinet: Karki II
- Preceded by: Uddhav Thapa
- Succeeded by: Kedar Karki
- In office 9 January 2023 – 7 July 2023
- Governor: Parshuram Khapung
- Cabinet: Karki I
- Preceded by: Rajendra Kumar Rai
- Succeeded by: Uddhav Thapa
Other senior positions
Leader of the House in the Koshi Provincial Assembly
Incumbent
Assumed office 9 May 2024
Speaker	Ambar Bahadur Bista
Preceded by	Kedar Karki
In office 8 September 2023 – 14 October 2023
Speaker	Vacant
Preceded by	Uddhav Thapa
Succeeded by	Kedar Karki
In office 9 January 2023 – 7 July 2023
Speaker	Baburam Gautam
Preceded by	Rajendra Kumar Rai
Succeeded by	Uddhav Thapa
Leader of the Opposition in the Koshi Provincial Assembly
In office 3 November 2023 – 3 May 2024
Governor	Parshuram Khapung
Chief Minister	Kedar Karki
Preceded by	Bhakti Prasad Sitaula
Succeeded by	Indra Bahadur Angbo
In office 7 July 2023 – 8 September 2023
Governor	Parshuram Khapung
Chief Minister	Uddhav Thapa
Preceded by	Uddhav Thapa
Succeeded by	Uddhav Thapa
Ministerial positions
Minister of Internal Affairs and Law
In office 8 September 2023 – 14 October 2023
Governor	Parshuram Khapung
Chief Minister	Himself
Preceded by	Uddhav Thapa
Succeeded by	Shamsher Rai
In office 9 January 2023 – 7 July 2023
Governor	Parshuram Khapung
Chief Minister	Himself
Preceded by	Kedar Karki
Succeeded by	Uddhav Thapa
In office 15 February 2018 – 26 August 2021
Governor	Somnath Adhikari
Chief Minister	Sher Dhan Rai
Preceded by	Constituon created
Succeeded by	Bhim Acharya
Minister of Economic Affairs and Planning
In office 8 September 2023 – 14 October 2023
Governor	Parshuram Khapung
Chief Minister	Himself
Preceded by	Jiwan Acharya
Succeeded by	Kedar Karki
In office 9 January 2023 – 7 July 2023
Governor	Parshuram Khapung
Chief Minister	Himself
Preceded by	Indra Bahadur Angbo
Succeeded by	Jiwan Acharya
Parliamentary offices
Parliamentary leader of the CPN (UML) in Koshi Provincial Assembly
Incumbent
Assumed office 26 December 2022
Preceded by	Bhim Acharya

Member of the Koshi Provincial Assembly
- Incumbent
- Assumed office 5 February 2018
- Constituency: Jhapa 5 (A)

Personal details
- Born: 26 September 1964 (age 62) Gauradha, Jhapa, Nepal
- Party: CPN-UML
- Other political affiliations: Nepal Communist Party
- Spouse: Anjana Pandey Karki
- Children: 3
- Education: Tribhuvan University (LLB)

Hikmat Kumar Karki (Nepali: हिक्मत कुमार कार्की; born 26 September 1964) is a Nepalese politician who has been serving as the Chief Minister of Koshi Province since 9 May 2024. Previously, he held the same position from 9 January 2023 to 7 July 2023, and from 8 September 2023 to 14 October 2023.

Karki is a member of the Communist Party of Nepal (Unified Marxist–Leninist) and serves on its standing committee. He has been serving as a member of the Provincial Assembly of Koshi Province from Jhapa 5 (A) since 5 February 2018 and was elected as the Parliamentary Party Leader of the CPN (Unified Marxist-Leninist) in the Provincial Assembly in December 2022. Karki, who served as the Minister for Internal Affairs and Law in Sher Dhan Rai's cabinet from 15 February 2018 to 26 August 2021, also served as the Leader of the Opposition in the Koshi Provincial Assembly during the periods of 7 July 2023 to 8 September 2023 and 3 November 2023 to 3 May 2024.

== Early life and education ==
Hikmat Kumar Karki was born as the third child to father late Bam Bahadur Karki and mother Januka Devi Karki on September 26, 1964, in Gauradah, Kingdom of Nepal. His childhood was spent in Gauradah, where he completed his SLC (School Leaving Certificate) education at Janata Secondary School, Gauradah. During his school years, he participated in the 1979 Nepalese student protests (2036 B.S.) and joined student politics by organizing with ANNFSU (All Nepal National Free Students Union). He came into contact with the party around the year 1979 (2036 B.S.). He later moved to Dharan in 1985 (2042 B.S.) with the objective of studying IL (Intermediate of Law) at Mahendra Multiple Campus. Then, he went on to join Nepal Law Campus in Kathmandu. Karki has completed his studies up to the Master of Laws (LLM) level at Tribhuvan University.

== Personal life ==
In 2001, Karki married Anjana Pandey Karki, with whom he has two daughters and one son.

== Electoral history ==
=== 2022 provincial elections ===
==== Jhapa 5 (A) ====
Candidate	Party	Votes	%
Hikmat Kumar Karki	CPN (UML)	22,530	49.27
Jeevan Kumar Rai	Nepali Congress	17,058	37.30
Dunnilal Rajbanshi	Janamat Party	2,485	5.43
Surya Prasad Limbu	Sanghiya Loktantrik Rastriya Manch	1,650	3.61
Lachhuman Limbu	People's Socialist Party	703	1.54
Others		1,305	2.85
Total		45,731	100.00
Majority		5,472	
CPN (UML) hold			

=== 2017 provincial elections ===
==== Jhapa 5 (A) ====
Candidate	Party	Votes	%
Hikmat Kumar Karki	CPN (UML)	24,098	53.12
Anil Krishna Prasai	Nepali Congress	18,636	41.08
Surya Prasad Limbu	Sanghiya Loktantrik Rastriya Manch	1,045	2.30
Others		1,586	3.50
Total		45,365	100.00
Valid votes		45,365	95.80
Invalid/blank votes		1,989	4.20
Total votes		47,354	100.00
CPN (UML) gain			
Source: Election Commission

== See also ==
- Communist Party of Nepal (Unified Marxist–Leninist)

Political offices
Preceded by Constituon created	Minister for Internal Affairs and Law; 2018 – 2021	Succeeded by Bhim Acharya
Preceded by Rajendra Kumar Rai	Chief Minister of Koshi Province; 2023 – 2023	Succeeded by Uddhav Thapa
Preceded by Uddhav Thapa	Chief Minister of Koshi Province; 2023 – 2023	Succeeded by Kedar Karki
Preceded by Kedar Karki	Chief Minister of Koshi Province; 2024 – present	Succeeded by Incumbent
