= Parshuram Khapung =

Governor of Koshi Province since 2021

Governor of Koshi Province
- In office 11 November 2021 – 10 November 2026
- Chief Minister: Rajendra Kumar Rai; Uddhav Thapa; Kedar Karki; Hikmat Kumar Karki
- Preceded by: Somnath Adhikari

Member of Rastriya Panchayat
- In office 1986–1990
- Preceded by: Tulsi Subba
- Succeeded by: Parliament abolished
- Constituency: Tehrathum

Personal details
- Born: Menchhayayem Rural Municipality, Tehrathum, Nepal
- Citizenship: Nepali
- Party: People's Socialist Party, Nepal

Parashuram Khapung (Limbu) is a Nepalese politician and current Governor of Koshi Province. He was appointed Governor, as per the Article 163 (2) of the Constitution of Nepal by the President Bidya Devi Bhandari on the recommendation of the Council of Ministers of the Government of Nepal on 11 November 2021 and served until 10 November 2026.

== Political life ==
Before being appointed Governor, he was a member of the People's Socialist Party. He was elected to the House of representatives from Tehrathum 1 in the 1986 Nepalese general election.
