= Koshi Provincial Assembly =

Unicameral legislature of the Nepalese province of Koshi

- 2nd Koshi Provincial Assembly

Type
- Type: Unicameral legislature of the Koshi Province
- Term limits: 5 years

History
- Founded: 2017; 9 years ago

Leadership
- Speaker: Ambar Bahadur Bista, RPP since 9 January 2024
- Deputy Speaker: Sirjana Danuwar, CPN (UML) since 14 January 2023
- Leader of the House: Hikmat Kumar Karki, CPN (UML) since 9 May 2024
- Leader of the Opposition: Uddhav Thapa, NC since 19 August 2026

Structure
- Political groups: Government (57): CPN (UML): 40; NCP: 17; Opposition (35): Congress: 29; RPP: 5; PSP: 1; Vacate (1): Vacate: 1
- Length of term: 5 years

Elections
- Voting system: Parallel voting: 56 seats – FPTP; 37 seats – PR
- First election: 2017
- Last election: 20 November 2022
- Next election: 2027

Meeting place
- District Coordination Committee Office, Biratnagar, Morang District

Website
- pradeshsabha.koshi.gov.np

The Koshi Provincial Assembly also known as the Koshi Pradesh Sabha, (Nepali: कोशी प्रदेश सभा) is the unicameral legislature of Koshi Province, one of the seven provinces in Nepal. The assembly is seated at the provincial capital at Biratnagar in Morang District at the District Coordination Committee Office. The assembly has 93 members of whom 56 are elected through first-past-the-post voting and 37 are elected through proportional representation. The term of the assembly is 5 years unless dissolved earlier.

The First Provincial Assembly was constituted in 2017, after the 2017 provincial elections. The current assembly was elected in November 2022.

== History ==
The Provincial Assembly of Province No. 1 is formed under Article 175 of the Constitution of Nepal 2015 which guarantees a provincial legislative for each province in the country. The first provincial elections were conducted for all seven provinces in Nepal and the elections in Province No. 1 was conducted for 93 seats to the assembly. The election resulted in a victory for the CPN (Unified Marxist–Leninist) and CPN (Maoist Centre) alliance which later went on to form a coalition government under Sher Dhan Rai from CPN (UML). The first meeting of the provincial assembly was held on 5 February 2018. Pradeep Kumar Bhandari from CPN (UML) was elected as the first speaker of the provincial assembly, and Saraswoti Pokharel from Maoist Centre as the first deputy speaker of the provincial assembly.

== List of assemblies ==
Election Year	Assembly	Start of term	End of term	Speaker	Chief Minister	Party
2017	1st Assembly	5 February 2018	September 2022	Pradeep Kumar Bhandari	Sher Dhan Rai (Cabinet)	CPN (UML)
2017	1st Assembly	5 February 2018	September 2022	Pradeep Kumar Bhandari	Bhim Acharya (Cabinet)	CPN (UML)
2017	1st Assembly	5 February 2018	September 2022	Pradeep Kumar Bhandari	Rajendra Kumar Rai (Cabinet)	CPN (Unified Socialist)
2022	2nd Assembly	1 January 2023	Incumbent	Baburam Gautam	Hikmat Kumar Karki (Cabinet)	CPN (UML)
2022	2nd Assembly	1 January 2023	Incumbent	Baburam Gautam	Uddhav Thapa (Cabinet)	Nepali Congress
2022	2nd Assembly	1 January 2023	Incumbent	Vacant	Uddhav Thapa (Cabinet)	Nepali Congress
2022	2nd Assembly	1 January 2023	Incumbent	Vacant	Hikmat Kumar Karki (Cabinet)	CPN (UML)
2022	2nd Assembly	1 January 2023	Incumbent	Ambar Bahadur Bista	Kedar Karki (Cabinet)	Nepali Congress
2022	2nd Assembly	1 January 2023	Incumbent	Ambar Bahadur Bista	Hikmat Kumar Karki (Cabinet)	CPN (UML)

== Committees ==
Article 195 of the Constitution of Nepal provides provincial assemblies the power to form special committees in order to manage working procedures.

S.No.	Committee
1	Justice, Administration and Legislation
2	Good Governance and Planning
3	Finance
4	Public Accounts
5	Social Development
6	Industry, Tourism and Environment
7	Natural Resources and Infrastructure Development

== Current composition ==
Party	Parliamentary party leader	Seats
CPN (UML)	Hikmat Kumar Karki	40
Nepali Congress	Uddhav Thapa	29
Nepali Communist Party	Indra Bahadur Angbo	17
Rastriya Prajatantra Party	Premraj Thamsuhang	5
People's Socialist Party	Nirmala Limbu	1
Vacate		1
Total		93

== See also ==
- Koshi Province
- Provincial assemblies of Nepal
