= Rajendra Kumar Rai cabinet =

3rd Government of Koshi Province from 2 November 2021 to 9 January 2023

- 3rd Cabinet of Province No. 1
- 2021–2023
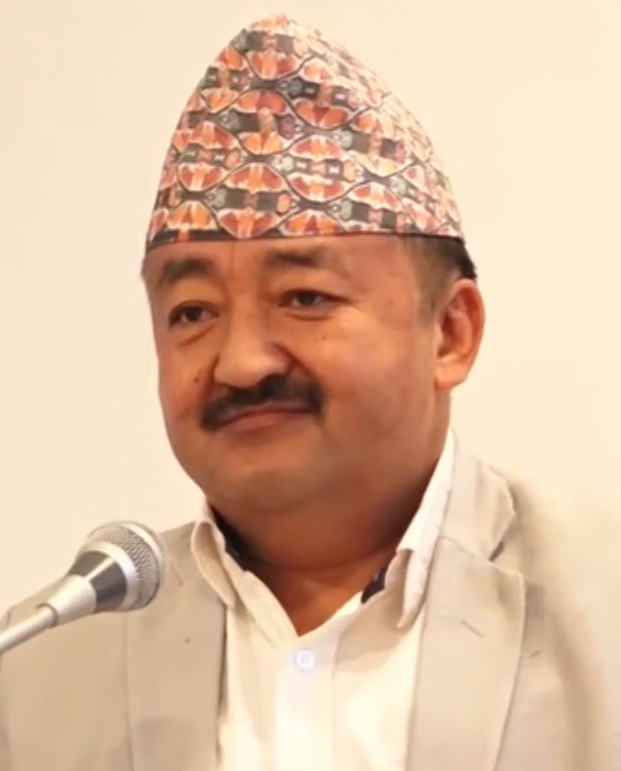
- Hon'ble Chief Minister Rajendra Kumar Rai
- Date formed: 2 November 2021
- Date dissolved: 9 January 2023

People and organisations
- Governor: Parshuram Khapung
- Chief Minister: Rajendra Kumar Rai
- No. of ministers: 14
- Total no. of members: 14
- Member parties: Unified Socialist Coalition partners: Congress; CPN (Maoist Centre); PSP-Nepal; SLRM
- Status in legislature: Provincial Assembly 50 / 93 (54%)
- Opposition party: CPN (UML)
- Opposition leader: Sher Dhan Rai

History
- Election: 2017
- Legislature term: 1st Provincial Assembly
- Predecessor: Bhim Acharya cabinet
- Successor: First Hikmat Kumar Karki cabinet

The Rajendra Kumar Rai cabinet was the 3rd provincial government of Province No. 1. It was formed after Rajendra Kumar Rai was sworn in as Chief Minister on 2 November 2021. The cabinet was expanded on 6 February 2022.

== Ministers ==
| S.N. | Portfolio | Holder | Party | Took office | Left office |
|---|---|---|---|---|---|
Cabinet ministers
| 1 | Office of Chief Minister and Council of Ministers | Rajendra Kumar Rai | Unified Socialist | 2 November 2021 | 9 January 2023 |
| 2 | Minister for Economic Affairs and Planning | Indra Bahadur Angbo | CPN (Maoist Centre) | 2 November 2021 | 9 January 2023 |
| 3 | Minister for Roads Infrastructure and Urban Development | Himal Karki | Congress | 2 November 2021 | 9 January 2023 |
| 4 | Minister for Internal Affairs and Law | Kedar Karki | Congress | 2 November 2021 | 9 January 2023 |
| 5 | Minister for Health | Jay Ram Yadav | PSP-Nepal | 2 November 2021 | 9 January 2023 |
| 6 | Minister for Energy, Water Supply and Irrigation | Ram Kumar Rai | Maoist Centre | 6 February 2022 | 9 January 2023 |
| 7 | Minister for Social Development | Rajan Rai | Unified Socialist | 6 February 2022 | 9 January 2023 |
| 8 | Minister for Agriculture | Jhalak Bahadur Magar | Maoist Centre | 6 February 2022 | 9 January 2023 |
| 9 | Minister for Forest, Environment and Soil Conservation | Shekhar Chandra Thapa | Congress | 6 February 2022 | 9 November 2022 |
| 10 | Minister for Land Management, Co-operatives and Poverty Allivation | Om Prakash Sarawagi | Congress | 6 February 2022 | 9 January 2023 |
| 11 | Minister for Industry, Labour and Employment | Pratap Prakash Hangam | Congress | 6 February 2022 | 9 January 2023 |
| 12 | Minister for Culture and Tourism | Khinu Langwa Limbu | Unified Socialist | 6 February 2022 | 9 January 2023 |
| 13 | Minister for Transportation and Communication | Upendra Ghimire | Unified Socialist | 6 February 2022 | 9 January 2023 |
State ministers
| 14 | Minister of state for Social Development | Bishnu Tumbahangphe | Sanghiya Loktantrik Rastriya Manch | 2 November 2021 | 9 January 2023 |

== See also ==
- Provincial governments of Nepal
- 1st Province No. 1 Provincial Assembly
