= Sher Dhan Rai cabinet =

- 1st Cabinet of Province No. 1
- Date formed: 15 February 2018
- Date dissolved: 26 August 2021

People and organisations
- Head of state: Somnath Adhikari Pyasi (as Governor of Province No. 1)
- Head of government: Sher Dhan Rai
- No. of ministers: 9
- Member parties: Communist Party of Nepal (Unified Marxist–Leninist)
- Status in legislature: Majority
- Opposition party: Nepali Congress
- Opposition leader: Rajiv Koirala

History
- Election: 2017
- Legislature term: 5 years
- Predecessor: Province established
- Successor: Bhim Acharya Cabinet

Sher Dhan Rai was sworn in as Chief Minister of Province No. 1 on 15 February 2018. Here is the list of ministers.

== Final arrangement ==
S.N.	Portfolio	Holder	Party	Took office	Left office
Cabinet ministers
1	Office of Chief Minister and Council of Ministers	Sher Dhan Rai	CPN(UML)	14 February 2018	26 August 2021
2	Minister for Internal Affairs and Law	Hikmat Kumar Karki	CPN(UML)	15 February 2018	26 August 2021
3	Minister for Economic Affairs and Planning	Tanka Angbuhang(Limbu)	CPN(UML)	27 March 2021	26 August 2021
4	Minister for Social Development	Usha kala Rai	CPN(UML)	15 February 2018	26 August 2021
5	Minister for Industry, Tourism, Forest and Environment	Jagadish Prasad Kusiyait	CPN(UML)	19 January 2020	26 August 2021
5	Minister for Physical Infrastructure and Development	Ambir Babu Gurung	CPN(UML)	27 March 2021	26 August 2021
7	Minister for Land Management, Agriculture and Co-operatives	Ram Bahadur Magar	CPN(UML)	27 March 2021	26 August 2021
State ministers			CPN(UML)		
8	Minister of State for Industry, Tourism, Forest and Environment	Raj Kumar Ojha	CPN(UML)	27 March 2021	26 August 2021
9	Minister of State for Land Management, Agriculture and Co-operatives	Kala Ghale	19 January 2020	26 August 2021	

== Former arrangement ==
Till March 2021

Sl No.	Name	Constituency (PR if blank)	Portfolio	Took office	Left office
1	Sher Dhan Rai, Chief Minister	Bhojpur 1(B)	Ministry for Physical Infrastructure Development Ministry for Land Management, Agriculture and Co-operatives Ministry for Economic Affairs and Planning Ministry of Social Development	15 February 2018	26 August 2021
2	Hikmat Kumar Karki	Jhapa 5(A)	Ministry of Internal Affairs and Law	15 February 2018	
3	Indra Bahadur Angbo	Panchthar 1(B)	Ministry for Economic Affairs and Planning	15 February 2018	26 December 2020
4	Jeevan Ghimire	Morang 4(B)	Ministry of Social Development	15 February 2018	27 December 2020
5	Jagadish Prasad Kusiyait	Sunsari 4(A)	Ministry for Industry, Tourism, Forest and Environment	15 February 2018	

=== Minister of State ===
Sl No.	Name	Constituency (PR if blank)	Portfolio	Took office	Left office
1	Ambir Babu Gurung	Okhaldhunga 1(A)	Minister of State for Physical Infrastructure Development	19 January 2020	
2	Jasmaya Gajamer Bishwakarma		Minister of State for Social Development	19 January 2020	27 December 2020
3	Bijay Kumar Biswas	Morang 4(A)	Minister of State for Industry, Tourism, Forest and Environment	19 January 2020	27 December 2020
4	Ram Bahadur Magar	Ilam 2(A)	Minister of State for Land Management, Agriculture and Co-operatives	19 January 2020	

== See also ==
- Lalbabu Raut cabinet
- Astalaxmi Shakya Cabinet
- Krishna Chandra Nepali cabinet
- Kul Prasad KC cabinet
- Mahendra Bahadur Shahi cabinet
- Trilochan Bhatta cabinet
