= Barahapokhari Rural Municipality =

Barahapokhari वराहपोखरी गाउँपालिका
- Rural Municipality
- Location in Province No. 1 Barahapokhari (Nepal)
- Coordinates: 26.95°N 86.82°E
- Province: Province No. 1
- District: Khotang
- Wards: 6
- Established: 10 March 2017
- Seat: Baghkhor Bhanjyang

Government
  - Type: Rural Council
  - Chairperson: Mr. Shalikram Banjara (NC)
  - Vice-chairperson: Mr.Bhuwalraj Rai (NCP US)
  - Provincial constituency: Khotang 1 (B)

Area
  - Total: 141.6 km^{2} (54.7 sq mi)

Population (2011)
  - Total: 14,349
  - Density: 101.3/km^{2} (262.5/sq mi)
- Time zone: UTC+5:45 (Nepal Standard Time)
- Website: official website

Barahapokhari (Nepali: वराहपोखरी गाउँपालिका) is a rural municipality (gaunpalika) out of eight rural municipality located in Khotang District of Province No. 1 of Nepal. There are a total of 10 municipalities in Khotang in which 2 are urban and 8 are rural.

According to Ministry of Federal Affairs and Local Developme Barahapokhari has an area of 141.6 square kilometres (54.7 mi^{2}) and the total population of the municipality is 14349 as of Census of Nepal 2011.

Pauwasera, Phaktang, Barahapokhari, Mauwabote, Saunechaur and Suntale which previously were all separate Village development committee merged to form this new local level body. Fulfilling the requirement of the new Constitution of Nepal 2015, Ministry of Federal Affairs and Local Development replaced all old VDCs and Municipalities into 753 new local level body (Municipality).

== Ward divisions ==
The rural municipality is divided into total 6 wards and the headquarter of this newly formed rural municipality is situated in Saunechaur.

Barahpokhari RM
Ward No.	Ward Name	Area (km2)	Pop. (2011)
1	Barahapokhari	36.43	3830
2	Suntale	27.29	2995
3	Saunechaur	13.21	2383
4	Phaktang	23.83	2176
5	Pauwasera	28.78	2355
6	Mauwabote	12.51	1410
