= Council of Ministers of Koshi Province =

Executive body in Nepal

- कोशी प्रदेशको मन्त्रिपरिषद्
- Emblem of Nepal

Agency overview
- Formed: 14 February 2018; 8 years ago
- Type: Highest executive body of the Government of Koshi Province
- Jurisdiction: Koshi Province, Nepal
- Headquarters: Biratnagar, Morang District
- Chief Minister responsible: Hikmat Kumar Karki
- Child agency: Ministries of the Government of Koshi Province
- Website: ocmcm.koshi.gov.np

The Council of Ministers of Koshi Province is the executive body of the provincial government of Koshi Province, Nepal. The Chief minister is the head of the council of ministers.

Since 9 May 2024, the Chief Minister has been Hikmat Kumar Karki.

== Formation ==
According to the Constitution of Nepal, the Chief Minister is appointed by the Province Head. The Province Head, on the recommendation of the Chief Minister, forms a provincial council of ministers consisting of members not exceeding twenty percent of the total number of members of the Provincial Assembly on the basis of the principle of inclusion.

== Oath of office and secrecy ==
The Chief Minister and Ministers are required to take an oath of office and secrecy before the Province Head prior to assuming their duties, in accordance with Part 13, Article 172 of the Constitution of Nepal. The form and wording of the oath are prescribed by the Act Relating to Oath, 2079.

'म (नाम) नेपालको सार्वभौमसत्ता र राजकीयसत्ता नेपाली जनतामा निहित रहेको नेपालको संविधानप्रति पूर्ण वफादार रही सत्य निष्ठापूर्वक प्रतिज्ञा गर्दै ईश्वरको/देश र जनताको नाममा शपथ लिन्छु कि मुख्यमन्त्रि/मन्त्रि पदको जिम्मेवारी प्रचलित कानूनको पालना गरी मुलुक र जनताको भलो चिताई कसैको डर नमानी, पक्षपात नगरी, पूर्वाग्रह वा खराब भावना नराखी इमान्दारीका साथ वहन गर्नेछु र आफ्नो कर्तव्य पालनाको सिलसिलामा आफूलाई जानकारीमा आएको कुरा म पदमा बहाल रहँदा वा नरहँदा जुनसुकै अवस्थामा पनि प्रचलित कानूनको पालना गर्दा बाहेक अरु अवस्थामा कुनै किसिमबाट पनि प्रकट वा संकेत गर्ने छैन।'

— अनुसूची; दफा ३(२), ३(३) र ५(२), शपथ सम्बन्धी ऐन, २०७९

'I, (name), do swear in the name of God (or, solemnly affirm in the name of the Nation and the People) that I will bear true faith and allegiance to the Constitution of Nepal, in which the sovereignty and state authority of Nepal are vested in the Nepali people. I will faithfully discharge the duties of my office as Chief Minister (or, Minister) in compliance with the prevailing laws, keeping the welfare of the country and the people as my foremost concern, without fear or favour, impartiality or prejudice, and with honesty. I further swear/affirm that I will not disclose or indicate any information that comes to my knowledge in the course of performing my duties, except as required by law, whether I remain in office or not.'

— Schedule; Sections 3(2), 3(3), and 5(2), Act Relating to oath, 2079

Note: The above English text is an unofficial translation and is a direct rendering of the original Nepali version as provided in the Act Relating to Oath, 2079. In case of any inconsistency, the Nepali version shall prevail.

== Removal ==
According to the Constitution of Nepal, the minister ceases to hold office by:

- tendering resignation in writing to the Chief Minister,
- removal by the Chief Minister,
- vacancy in the office of Chief Minister, or,
- death.

== Current Council of Ministers ==
The list of ministers is as follows:

Third Hikmat Karki Cabinet
Minister	Portfolio	Office(s)	Took office	Ref.
Chief Minister
Hikmat Kumar Karki	Chief Minister of Koshi Province	Office of the Chief Minister and Council of Ministers	9 May 2024 (2 years, 91 days)	
Cabinet Ministers
Bidur Kumar Lingthep	Minister of Economic Affairs and Planning	Ministry of Economic Affairs and Planning	6 January 2026	
Indra Mani Parajuli	Minister of Internal Affairs and Law	Ministry of Internal Affairs and Law	6 January 2026	
Pradip Kumar Sunuwar	Minister of Physical Infrastructure Development	Ministry of Physical Infrastructure Development	6 January 2026	
Man Bahadur Limbu	Minister of Health	Ministry of Health	6 January 2026	
Ram Prasad Mahato	Minister of Social Development	Ministry of Social Development	6 January 2026	
Tilchan Pathak	Minister of Water Supply, Irrigation and Energy	Ministry of Water Supply, Irrigation and Energy	6 January 2026	
Bhim Parajuli	Minister of Tourism, Forests and Environment	Ministry of Tourism, Forests and Environment	6 January 2026	
Esrael Mansuri	Minister of Industry, Agriculture and Cooperatives	Ministry of Industry, Agriculture and Cooperatives	6 January 2026	
State Ministers
Umakant Gautam	Minister of State for Internal Affairs and Law	Ministry of Internal Affairs and Law	6 January 2026	
Sobha Chemjong	Minister of State for Physical Infrastructure Development	Ministry of Physical Infrastructure Development	6 January 2026	
Source: Office of the Chief Minister and Council of Ministers
