= Bhim Acharya cabinet =

2nd Government of Koshi Province from 26 August to 1 November 2021

- 2nd Cabinet of Province No. 1
- Hon'ble Chief Minister Bhim Acharya
- Date formed: 26 August 2021
- Date dissolved: 1 November 2021

People and organisations
- Head of state: Somnath Adhikari(as Governor of Province No. 1)
- Head of government: Bhim Acharya
- No. of ministers: 9
- Member parties: CPN (UML)
- Opposition party: Nepali Congress
- Opposition leader: Rajiv Koirala

History
- Election: 2017
- Legislature term: 5 years
- Predecessor: Sher Dhan Rai cabinet
- Successor: Rajendra Kumar Rai cabinet

Bhim Acharya was sworn in as Chief Minister of Province No. 1 on 26 August 2021. Here is the list of ministers.

== Chief Minister & Cabinet Ministers ==
=== Final Arrangement ===
Party	Portfolio	Portrait	Holder	Took office
Party	Cabinet ministers			
CPN (Unified Marxist–Leninist)	Chief Minister; Minister for Internal Affairs and Law; Minister for Infrastructure Development		Bhim Acharya	26 August 2021
CPN (Unified Marxist–Leninist)	Minister for Economic Affairs and Planning		Tulsi Prasad Neupane	15 September 2021
CPN (Unified Marxist–Leninist)	Minister for Land Management, Agriculture and Co-operation		Hira Kumar Thapa	15 September 2021
CPN (Unified Marxist–Leninist)	Minister for Industry, Tourism, Forest and Environment		Lachhman Tiwari	27 August 2021
CPN (Unified Marxist–Leninist)	Minister for Social Development		Bal Bahadur Samsohang	27 August 2021
State Ministers
CPN (Unified Marxist–Leninist)	Minister of State for Internal Affairs and Law		Lila Ballabh Adhikari	15 September 2021
CPN (Unified Marxist–Leninist)	Minister of State for Land Management, Agriculture and Co-operatives		Gyaneshwor Rajbanshi	15 September 2021
CPN (Unified Marxist–Leninist)	Minister of State for Industry, Tourism, Forest and Environment		Uttam Kumar Basnet	15 September 2021

== See also ==
- Lalbabu Raut cabinet
- Astalaxmi Shakya Cabinet
- Krishna Chandra Nepali cabinet
- Kul Prasad KC cabinet
- Mahendra Bahadur Shahi cabinet
- Trilochan Bhatta cabinet
