= Ram Bahadur Ranamagar =

Nepalese politician

- रामबहादुर रानामगर

Minister for Economic Affairs and Planning of Koshi Province
- Incumbent
- Assumed office 9 May 2024
- Governor: Parshuram Khapung
- Chief Minister: Hikmat Kumar Karki
- Preceded by: Kedar Karki

Minister for Land Management, Agriculture and Cooperatives of Koshi Province
- In office 27 March 2021 – 26 August 2021
- Governor: Somnath Adhikari
- Chief Minister: Sher Dhan Rai; Himself
- Preceded by: Hira Kumar Thapa
- Succeeded by: Kala Ghale

Minister of State for Land Management, Agriculture and Cooperatives of Koshi Province
- In office 20 January 2020 – 27 March 2021
- Governor: Somnath Adhikari
- Chief Minister: Sher Dhan Rai
- Preceded by: Constituon created
- Succeeded by: Kala Ghale

Personal details
- Born: 4 December 1961 (age 64) Ilam, Nepal
- Party: CPN (UML)

Ram Bahadur Ranamagar (Nepali: रामबहादुर रानामगर) is a Nepalese politician, belonging to the CPN (Unified Marxist-Leninist). He is currently serving as the Minister for Economic Affairs and Planning of Koshi Province since 9 May 2024. Ranamagar has been serving as a member of the Koshi Provincial Assembly from Ilam 2(B) constituency since 2017.

Ranamagar has been appointed as the parliamentary party deputy leader of the CPN (UML) in Koshi Provincial Assembly on 3 May 2023. He had previously served as the Minister for Land Management, Agriculture and Co-operatives and Minister of State for Land Management, Agriculture and Co-operatives in Sher Dhan Rai's cabinet.

== Electoral history ==
=== 2022 provincial elections ===
==== Ilam 2(B) ====
Candidate	Party	Votes	%
Ram Bahadur Ranamagar	CPN (UML)	13,754	44.39
Harka Bahadur Lawati	CPN (Maoist Centre)	11,167	36.04
Binay Kumar Phagu	Sanghiya Loktantrik Rastriya Manch	2,054	6.63
Pabitra Limbu Tumbangphe	Rastriya Janamukti Party	1,415	4.57
Bal Bahadur Angdembe	People's Socialist Party	798	2.58
Ujit Kumar Rai	Mongol National Organisation	739	2.38
Others	1,060	3.42	
Total		30,987	100.00
Majority		2,587	
CPN (UML)			
