= Indra Bahadur Angbo =

Nepali politician

- ईन्द्र बहादुर आङबो

Leader of the Opposition in the Koshi Provincial Assembly
- Incumbent
- Assumed office 13 September 2024
- Governor: Parshuram Khapung
- Chief Minister: Hikmat Kumar Karki
- Preceded by: Uddhav Thapa

Minister for Economic Affairs and Planning of Koshi Province
- In office 2 November 2021 – 9 January 2023
- Governor: Somnath Adhikari; Parshuram Khapung
- Chief Minister: Rajendra Kumar Rai
- Preceded by: Tulasi Prasad Neupane
- Succeeded by: Hikmat Kumar Karki
- In office 15 February 2018 – 26 December 2020
- Governor: Govinda Subba; Somnath Adhikari
- Chief Minister: Sher Dhan Rai
- Preceded by: Province established
- Succeeded by: Tanka Angbuhang Limbu

Personal details
- Born: 13 August 1982 (age 44) Panchthar District, Nepal
- Party: Communist Party of Nepal (Maoist Centre) (before 2018: since 2021)
- Other political affiliations: Nepal Communist Party (2018 - 2021)

Indra Bahadur Angbo (Nepali: ईन्द्र बहादुर आङबो; born 13 August 1982) is a Nepalese politician, who currently serving as the parliamentary party leader of the CPN (Maoist Centre) and Leader of the Opposition in the Koshi Provincial Assembly. He has been serving as a member of the Koshi Provincial Assembly from Panchthar 1(B) since 2017.

He had previously served as the Minister for Economic Affairs and Planning in the Government of Koshi Province from 15 February 2018 to 26 December 2020, 2 November 2021 to 9 January 2023.
