= Lila Ballabh Adhikari =

Nepalese politician

- लीलाबल्लभ अधिकारी

Minister for Internal Affairs and Law of Koshi Province
- In office 17 May 2024 – 6 November 2024
- Governor: Parshuram Khapung
- Chief Minister: Hikmat Kumar Karki
- Preceded by: Shamsher Rai
- Succeeded by: Rewati Raman Bhandari
- In office 25 September 2023 – 14 October 2023
- Governor: Parshuram Khapung
- Chief Minister: Hikmat Kumar Karki
- Preceded by: Hikmat Kumar Karki
- Succeeded by: Shamsher Rai

Minister of State for Internal Affairs and Law of Koshi Province
- In office 15 September 2021 – 1 November 2021
- Governor: Somnath Adhikari
- Chief Minister: Bhim Acharya
- Preceded by: Constituon created
- Succeeded by: Sunita Kumari Gurung

Member of the Koshi Provincial Assembly
- Incumbent
- Assumed office 5 February 2018
- Constituency: Morang 2(B)

Personal details
- Party: CPN (Unified Marxist–Leninist)
- Other political affiliations: Nepal Communist Party

Lila Ballabh Adhikari (Nepali: लीलाबल्लभ अधिकारी) is a Nepalese politician, belonging to the Communist Party of Nepal (Unified Marxist–Leninist). He has served as the Minister for Internal Affairs and Law in Koshi Province. Adhikari has been serving as a member of the Koshi Provincial Assembly from Morang 2 (B) since 2017. He had previously served as the Minister for Internal Affairs and Law in Bhim Acharya's cabinet from 15 September 2021 to 1 November 2021.

== Electoral history ==
=== 2022 provincial elections ===
==== Morang 2(B) ====
Candidate	Party	Votes	%
Lila Ballabh Adhikari	CPN (UML)	17,752	46.08
Binod Karki	Nepali Congress	14,952	38.81
Rajendra Adhikari	Rastriya Prajatantra Party	3,095	8.03
Others		2,729	7.08
Total		38,528	100.00
Majority		2,800	
CPN (UML)			
Source: Election Commission

=== 2017 provincial elections ===
==== Morang 2(B) ====
Candidate	Party	Votes	%
Lila Ballabh Adhikari	CPN (UML)	18,386	47.76
Ghanindra Bahadur Kunwar	Nepali Congress	17,127	44.49
Aashi Nath Rajbanshi	Federal Socialist Forum, Nepal	1,356	3.52
Others		1,630	4.23
Total		38,499	100.00
Valid votes		38,499	100.00
Invalid/blank votes		0	0.00
Total votes		38,499	100.00
Majority		1,259	
CPN (UML)			
Source: Election Commission
