= Minister for Social Development (Koshi Province) =

Nepalese government position

- सामाजिक विकास मन्त्री
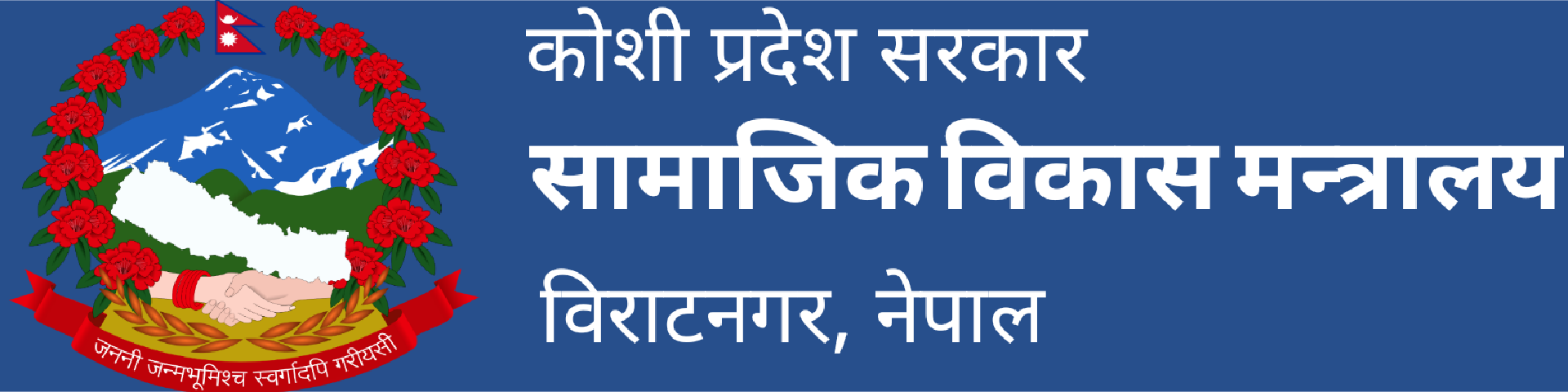
- Logo of Ministry of Social Development
- Incumbent; Ram Prasad Mahato since 6 January 2026
- Ministry of Social Development
- Style: Honourable; Mr. Minister
- Member of: Koshi Provincial; Cabinet
- Reports to: Chief Minister; Koshi Provincial
- Nominator: Chief Minister
- Appointer: Governor
- Term length: No fixed term
- Constituting instrument: Constitution of Nepal
- Inaugural holder: Jivan Ghimire
- Formation: 15 February 2018 (8 years ago)

The Minister for Social Development is the head of the Ministry of Social Development of the Government of Koshi Province. One of the senior-most officers in the Provincial Cabinet, the minister is responsible for the management and promotion of labor and employment and the province's education, youth sports, women, children, senior citizens, disabilities and social security, program implementation, and regulating and managing non-plans.

The Incumbent, minister is Ram Prasad Mahato, who took office on 6 January 2026.He belongs to the kushwaha(koiri) caste of Nepal

== List of former ministers ==
Parties
Nepali Congress
CPN (Unified Marxist–Leninist)
CPN (Maoist Centre)
People's Socialist Party, Nepal

Status
Denotes as Chief Minister

No.	Name Constituency	Took of office			Party	Chief Minister(s)
Minister for Social Development
1	Jivan Ghimire; MPA for Morang 4 (B)	15 February 2018	26 December 2020	1,042	CPN (Unified Marxist–Leninist)	Sher Dhan Rai
–	Sher Dhan Rai; MPA for Bhojpur 1 (B)	26 December 2020	26 March 2021	90	CPN (Unified Marxist–Leninist)	Sher Dhan Rai
2	Usha Kala Rai; List MPA	26 March 2021	26 August 2021	153	CPN (Unified Marxist-Leninist)	Sher Dhan Rai
3	Bal Bahadur Samsohang; MPA for Taplejung 1 (A)	26 August 2021	1 November 2021	67	CPN (Unified Marxist–Leninist)	Bhim Acharya
4	Jayram Yadav; MPA for Morang 5 (B)	2 November 2021	6 February 2022	96	PSP-N	Rajendra Kumar Rai
5	Rajan Rai; MPA for Khotang 1 (A)	6 February 2022	9 January 2023	337	CPN (Unified Socialist)	Rajendra Kumar Rai
6	Buddhi Kumar Rajbhandari; MPA for Solukhumbu 1 (B)	13 January 2023	7 July 2023	175	CPN (Unified Marxist-Leninist)	Hikmat Kumar Karki
–	Uddhav Thapa; List MPA	7 July 2023	2 August 2023	63	Nepali Congress	himself
–	Uddhav Thapa; List MPA	2 August 2023	8 September 2023	63	Nepali Congress	himself
–	Hikmat Kumar Karki; MPA for Jhapa 5 (A)	8 September 2023	14 October 2023	37	CPN (Unified Marxist–Leninist)	himself
–	Kedar Karki; MPA for Morang 6 (B)	15 October 2023	9 February 2024	117	Nepali Congress	himself
7	Rajendra Karki; MPA for Sankhuwasabha 1 (A)	9 February 2024	8 April 2024	59	CPN (Maoist Centre)	Kedar Karki
8	Panch Karna Rai; MPA for Khotang 1 (A)	17 May 2024	6 January 2026	599	CPN (Unified Marxist–Leninist)	Hikmat Kumar Karki
9	Ram Prasad Mahato; MPA for Sunsari 2 (B)	6 January 2026	Incumbent	244	CPN (Unified Marxist–Leninist)	Hikmat Kumar Karki
