= Hari Nath Bastola =

Nepalese politician

- हरिनाथ बास्तोला
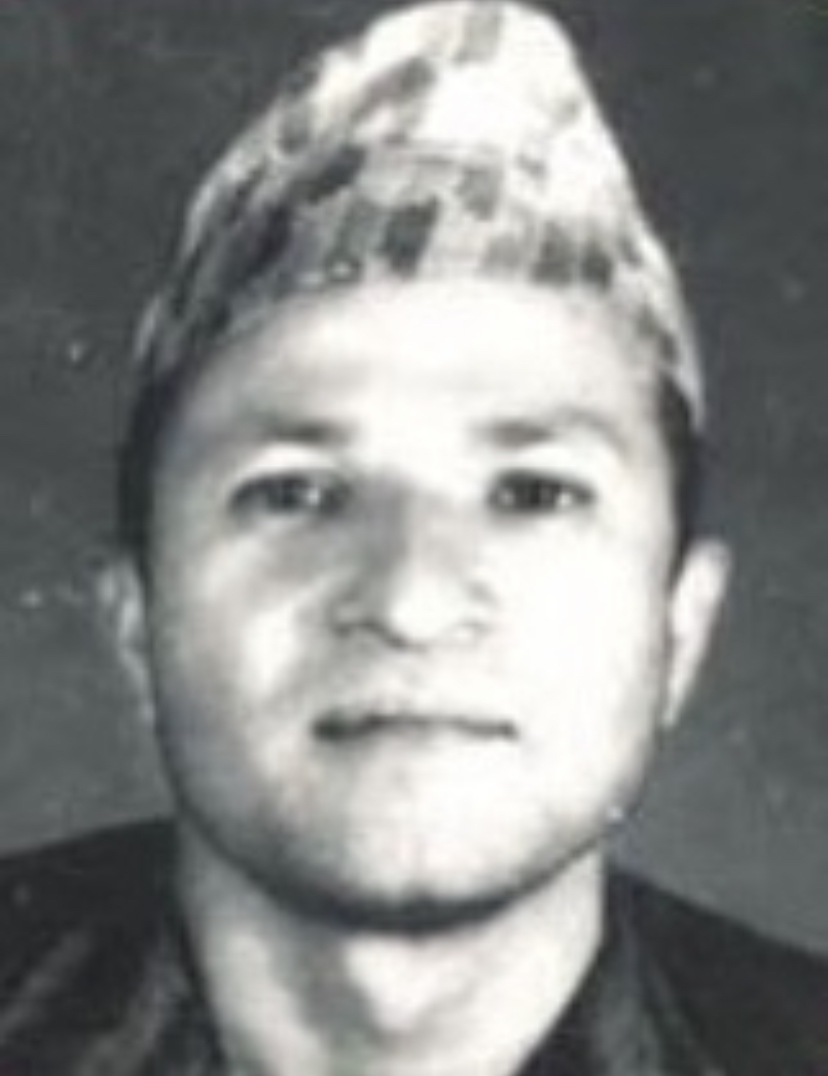

Member of the House of Representatives
- In office November 1994 – May 1999
- Prime Minister: Girija Prasad Koirala
- Preceded by: Khalil Miya
- Succeeded by: Hari Prasad Sapkota
- Constituency: Sunsari-4

Personal details
- Born: October 30, 1942 (age 83) Dhankuta District, Nepal
- Party: Nepali Congress
- Spouse: Uma Bastola
- Children: 5
- Awards: Ganesh Man Singh Democracy Fighter Honor (2022)

Hari Nath Bastola (Nepali: हरिनाथ बास्तोला) is a Nepali politician, belonging to the Nepali Congress. He was elected to the Pratinidhi Sabha in the 1994 election from the Sunsari-4 constituency with 16922 votes. This was the second election to take place after King Birenda agreed to introduce democracy in 1990 and to become a constitutional monarch after increasing protests by the 1990 People's Movement which Bastola's wife Uma Bastola and son Taj Nath (Mukesh) Bastola participated in.

In recognition of his "contribution to the establishment, restoration, and protection of democracy," the Ganesh Man Singh Foundation conferred the Ganesh Man Singh Democracy Fighter Honor on Bastola and 10 other Nepali leaders in June 2022.

== Background ==
Bastola was a pro-democracy activist who was a political prisoner several times prior to his election to the Pratinidhi Sabha. He advocated for a constitutional monarchy and a multi-party democracy in Nepal. For over 25 years, Bastola served as President of Sunsari District's Nepali Congress party, an office to which B. P. Koirala appointed him. He is one of the longest-serving District Presidents of the Nepali Congress party. His home served as a field office for the party's Eastern Region. This was at a time when the Nepali Congress was banned by the monarchy and operating underground.

== Constituency and Platform ==
Bastola was known as an honest and dedicated leader by his Sunsari constituency. His constituency is a multi-ethnic region on the outskirts of Nepal bordering India. In Parliament, he fought for legislation to bring equal representation of minority ethnicities such as the Terai people as well as stronger infrastructure and economic development in his district.

=== 1994 legislative elections ===
Party	Candidate	Votes
Nepali Congress	Hari Nath Bastola	16,922
CPN (Unified Marxist–Leninist)	Bhim Prasad Acharya	13,714
Rastriya Prajatantra Party	Dil Bahadur Shrestha	9,561
Others		1,605
Result	Congress hold	
Source: Election Commission

=== Parliament/Constituent Assembly ===
Election	Member	Party
1991	Khalil Miya	Nepali Congress
1994	Hari Nath Bastola	Nepali Congress
1999	Hari Prasad Sapkota	Nepali Congress
2008	Muga Lal Mahato	Madheshi Janaadhikar Forum, Nepal
June 2009	Muga Lal Mahato	Madheshi Janaadhikar Forum, Nepal (Democratic)
2013	Sitaram Mahato	Nepali Congress
2017	Gyanendra Bahadur Karki	Nepali Congress

== Family and personal life ==
Prior to his tenure in Parliament, he operated Pindeshwor Feed Industry which he owned in Dharan.

Bastola's wife Uma Bastola and son Taj Nath (Mukesh) Bastola took part in the 1990 People's Movement. Uma Bastola mobilized women in the Sunsari-4 district to join the movement and even ran for a seat in the Pratinidhi Sabha from Sunsari 1 (constituency) in Dharan. She was also the President of Sunsari district's Nepal Woman Association and later served as a Central Member of the association.

Eldest son Taj Nath (Mukesh) Bastola was appointed President of Nepal Student Union's Sunsari district where he served under the leadership of national President Bal Krishna Khand. Taj Bastola and Uma Bastola were also political prisoners prior to the introduction of democracy when Nepali Congress was still a banned party.

Bastola's middle son Rajesh Nath Bastola is a high-ranking law enforcement officer currently serving as a Senior Superintendent of the Nepal Police (SSP).

Upon ending his term on the Pratinidhi Sabha, Hari Nath Bastola worked for the Nepali Congress party where he travelled around the country continuing to organize for the party and expand its base.

Hari Nath Bastola now travels between the United States and Nepal to see his family but remains an active voice against corruption and discrimination, even in his own party. He is actively involved in social work in his own constituency as well. A current project he is working on is the creation of a Mandir in Barahakshetra which he hopes will develop the area through internal tourism and increase the public welfare and revenue of the community. He has fundraised internationally to support this project.
