= Second Uddhav Thapa cabinet =

6th Government of Koshi Province from 2 August to 8 September 2023

- 5th Cabinet of Koshi Province
- Hon'ble Chief Minister Uddhav Thapa
- Date formed: 2 August 2023
- Date dissolved: 8 September 2023

People and organisations
- Governor: Parshuram Khapung
- Chief Minister: Uddhav Thapa
- No. of ministers: 6
- Member parties: Nepali Congress Coalition partner; Maoist Centre; Unified Socialist External Support; PSP-N
- Status in legislature: Majority Coalition Government (July - September 2023)
- Opposition party: CPN (UML)
- Opposition leader: Hikmat Kumar Karki, CPN (UML)

History
- Election: 2022
- Legislature term: 5 years
- Predecessor: First Uddhav Thapa cabinet
- Successor: Second Hikmat Karki cabinet

The Second Uddhav Thapa cabinet was the 6th provincial government of Koshi Province. It was formed after Uddhav Thapa was sworn in as Chief Minister of Koshi Province on 2 August 2023.

Thapa had staked claim for the post of chief minister with the support of 29 lawmakers from Nepali Congress, 13 from CPN (Maoist Center), four from CPN (Unified Socialist) and one from People's Socialist Party, Nepal.

== Ministries ==
S.N.	Portfolio	Minister	Party	Assumed office	Left office
Cabinet ministers
1	Chief Minister's Office: All other ministries not allocated to anyone.	Uddhav Thapa	Congress	2 August 2023	8 September 2023
2	Minister for Economic Affairs and Planning	Baburam Gautam	Maoist Centre	2 August 2023	8 September 2023
3	Minister for Water Supply, Irrigation and Energy	Pradip Kumar Sunuwar	Congress	2 August 2023	8 September 2023
4	Minister for Physical Infrastructure Development	Kamal Prasad Jabegu	Unified Socialist	2 August 2023	8 September 2023
5	Minister for Health	Nirmala Limbu	PSP-Nepal	12 August 2023	8 September 2023
State ministers
6	Minister of State for Industry, Agriculture and Cooperatives	Gayananda Mandal Gangai	Congress	16 August 2023	8 September 2023

== See also ==
- Uddhav Thapa cabinet
