= Usha Kala Rai =

Nepalese female politician

- उषाकला राई

Minister for Social Development of Koshi Province
- In office 27 March 2021 – 26 August 2021
- Governor: Somnath Adhikari
- Chief Minister: Sher Dhan Rai
- Preceded by: Jivan Ghimire
- Succeeded by: Bal Bahadur Samsohang

Member of the Koshi Provincial Assembly
- In office 5 February 2018 – September 2022
- PR group: Indigenous (Women)
- Constituency: CPN (UML) PR list

Member of the Constituent Assembly
- In office 4 July 2008 – 28 May 2012
- PR group: Indigenous (Women)
- Constituency: CPN (UML) PR list

Personal details
- Born: Usha Kala Rai; 13 August 1969 (age 57) Kahalle, Khotang, Nepal
- Citizenship: Nepali
- Party: Communist Party of Nepal (Unified Marxist–Leninist)
- Other political affiliations: Nepal Communist Party
- Spouse: Sher Bahadur Tamang (m. 2002)
- Parents: Rudra Kumar Rai (father); Laxmi Rai (mother)
- Education: ASCOL, TU (Masters)

Usha Kala Rai (Nepali: उषाकला राई; born 13 August 1969) is a Nepalese politician and member of the Koshi Provincial Assembly from CPN (Unified Marxist–Leninist) Party. She has served as the Minister for Social Development of Koshi Province. Following the 2008 Constituent Assembly election, she was selected by CPN (UML) from the Proportional Representation quota to represent the party in the assembly.
