= Jhalak Bahadur Magar =

Nepalese politician

- झलक बहादुर मगर

Minister for Agriculture of Koshi Province
- In office 6 February 2021 – 9 January 2023
- Governor: Parshuram Khapung
- Chief Minister: Rajendra Kumar Rai
- Preceded by: Hira Thapa
- Succeeded by: Bhakti Prasad Sitaula

Member of the Koshi Provincial Assembly
- In office 31 January 2018 – 18 September 2022
- Preceded by: Constituency created
- Succeeded by: Radha Krishna Sharma
- Constituency: Jhapa 4(A)

Personal details
- Citizenship: Nepali
- Party: Communist Party of Nepal (Maoist Centre)
- Other political affiliations: Nepal Communist Party

Jhalak Bahadur Magar (Nepali: झलक बहादुर मगर) is a Nepalese politician, belonging to the Communist Party of Nepal (Maoist Centre) party. He has serving as the Minister for Agriculture in Rajendra Kumar Rai's cabinet from 2022 to 2023. He also serves as a member of the Koshi Provincial Assembly and was elected from Jhapa 4 (A) constituency.

Magar lost an election in 2022, being defeated by CPN (UML) candidate Radha Krishna Sharma in Jhapa 4 (A) with a margin of 1,578 votes.
