= Ministry of Social Development =

Ministry of Social Development may refer to:

- Ministry of Social Development (Argentina)
- Ministry of Social Development and Fight against Hunger (Brazil)
- Ministry of Information and Social Development (Kazakhstan)
- Ministry of Social Development (Guatemala)
- Ministry of Social Development (New Zealand)
- Ministry of Social Development (Panama)
- Ministry of Social Development and Human Security (Thailand)
- Ministry of Social Development (Uruguay)
- Ministry of Social Development (Koshi Province)

== See also ==
- Department of Social Development (disambiguation)
- Minister of Social Development (disambiguation)
