= Jivan Ghimire =

Nepalese politician

- जीवन घिमिरे

Minister for Social Development
- In office 14 February 2018 – 27 December 2020
- Governor: Govinda Subba; Somnath Adhikari
- Chief Minister: Sher Dhan Rai
- Preceded by: Constituency created

Member of the Koshi Provincial Assembly
- In office 5 February 2018 – September 2022
- Preceded by: Constituency created
- Succeeded by: Bhim Parajuli
- Constituency: Morang 4(B)

Personal details
- Party: CPN (Unified Marxist–Leninist)

Jivan Ghimire (Nepali: जीवन घिमिरे)is a Nepalese politician and member of the CPN (Unified Marxist–Leninist) Party. He has served as the Minister for Social Development of Koshi Province. He was also a member of the 1st Koshi Provincial Assembly and was elected from Morang 4 (B) constituency.

== Electoral history ==
=== 2022 provincial elections ===
==== Morang 2(B) ====
Candidate	Party	Votes	%
Bhim Parajuli	Nepali Congress	11,479	36.59
Jivan Ghimire	CPN (UML)	9,691	30.89
Madhav Prasad Acharya	Rastriya Prajatantra Party	6,935	22.10
Madhav Prasad Acharya	People's Socialist Party, Nepal	1,460	4.65
Others		1,811	5.77
Total		31,376	100.00
Majority		1,788	
Nepali Congress			
Source: Election Commission

=== 2017 provincial elections ===
==== Morang 4(B) ====
Candidate	Party	Votes	%
Jivan Ghimire	CPN (UML)	13,805	46.14
Bishwanath Rijal	Nepali Congress	11,625	38.85
Shriram Kamat	Federal Socialist Forum, Nepal	3,621	12.10
Others		868	2.90
Total		29,919	100.00
Valid votes		29,919	95.63
Invalid/blank votes		1,367	4.37
Total votes		31,286	100.00
Majority		2,180	
CPN (UML)			
Source: Election Commission
