= DSD =

DSD may refer to:

== Medical ==
- Detrusor sphincter dyssynergia, disorder of urination
- Disorders of sex development, differences of sex differentiation
- Diaphanospondylodysostosis, a rare autosomal recessive skeletal disorder

== Technology ==
- Data structure diagram of a data model
- Direct Stream Digital, Sony and Philips digital recording trademark
- Document Structure Description, a schema language for describing valid XML

== Organizations ==
- Defence Signals Directorate, an Australian intelligence agency
- Department for Social Development
- Det Stavangerske Dampskibsselskap, a Norwegian transport and shipping company
- Drainage Services Department, Hong Kong
- Davis School District, Utah
- Delaware School for the Deaf

== Government ==
- United States District Court for the District of South Dakota, abbreviation in case decisions
- Downing Street Declaration, by UK PM and Irish Taoiseach
- New Zealand Distinguished Service Decoration, a medal awarded by the New Zealand Defence Force

== Media ==
- Do Something Different, a British CBBC television show

== Other uses ==
- Deutsches Sprachdiplom (German Language Diploma), of the German Academic Exchange Service
- Discover Scuba Diving program
- Driver's Safety Device, or dead man's switch
- Raindrop size distribution in rain, snow, etc.
- Köppen climate classification#Dsd Subarctic or boreal climates with severe winters
