= Ram Kumar Rai =

Nepali politician

- राम कुमार राई

Minister for Water Supply, Irrigation and Energy of Koshi Province
- In office 6 February 2022 – 2022
- Governor: Parshuram Khapung
- Chief Minister: Rajendra Kumar Rai
- Preceded by: Constituency established
- Succeeded by: Til Kumar Menyangbo Limbu

Member of Parliament, Pratinidhi Sabha
- Incumbent
- Assumed office 24 December 2022
- Preceded by: Bishal Bhattarai
- Constituency: Khotang 1

Member of the Constituent Assembly / Legislature Parliament
- In office 28 May 2008 – 28 May 2012
- Preceded by: Sarbadhan Rai
- Succeeded by: Panch Karna Rai
- Constituency: Khotang 1

Member of the Koshi Provincial Assembly
- In office 5 February 2018 – 2 September 2022
- Preceded by: Constituency established
- Succeeded by: Bhupendra Rai
- Constituency: Khotang 1(B)

Personal details
- Born: 26 April 1968 (age 57) Khotang District
- Party: CPN (Maoist Centre)

Ram Kumar Rai is a Nepalese politician belonging to the Communist Party of Nepal (Maoist Centre) currently serving as a member of the 2nd Federal Parliament of Nepal. In the 2022 Nepalese general election, he was elected from the Khotang 1 (constituency).
