= Upendra Ghimire =

Nepalese politician

Honourable Upendra Ghimire
- उपेन्द्र घिमिरे
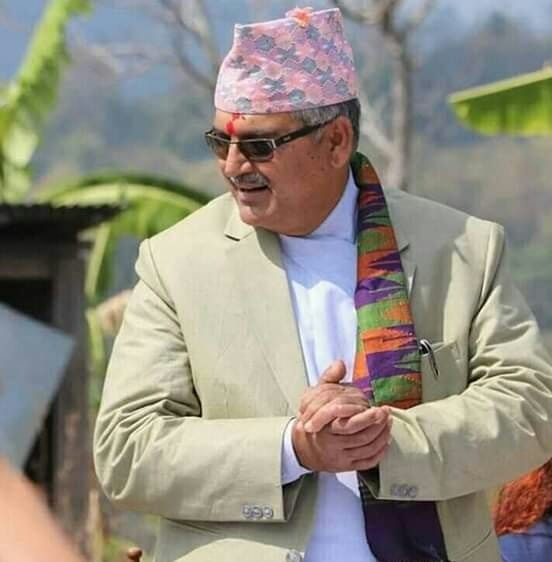

Minister for Transportation Management and Communication of Province No. 1
- Incumbent
- Assumed office 6 February 2021
- Governor: Parshuram Khapung
- Chief Minister: Rajendra Kumar Rai
- Preceded by: Position created

Member of Provincial Assembly of Province No. 1
- Incumbent
- Assumed office 2017
- President: Bidya Devi Bhandari
- Prime Minister: Sher Bahadur Deuba
- Constituency: Morang 1(B)

Personal details
- Born: Morang, Nepal
- Party: CPN (Unified Socialist)

Upendra Ghimire (Nepali: उपेन्द्र घिमिरे) is a Nepalese politician belonging to CPN (Unified Socialist). He is also serving as member of Provincial Assembly.

He is currently serving as Minister for Transportation Management and Communications of Province No. 1.

== Electoral history ==
=== 2017 Nepalese provincial elections ===
Morang 1(B)
Party	Candidate	Votes
CPN (Unified Marxist–Leninist)	Upendra Ghimire	17,117
Nepali Congress	Ishwari Koirala	14,310
Sanghiya Loktantrik Rastriya Manch	Nagendra Bahadur Limbu	1,124
Others		1,015
Invalid votes		1,781
Result	CPN (UML) gain	
Source: Election Commission

== See also ==
- CPN (Unified Socialist)
