= Sunsari 4 =

Parliamentary constituency in Province No. 1, Nepal

- Parliamentary constituency
- Sunsari 4 in Province No. 1
- Province: Province No. 1
- District: Sunsari District

Current constituency
- Created: 1991
- Party: Rastriya Swatantra Party
- Member of Parliament: Deepak Kumar Sah, RSP
- Member of the Provincial Assembly: Sadanand Mandal, CPN (UML)
- Member of the Provincial Assembly: Israel Mansuri, NC

Sunsari 4 is one of four parliamentary constituencies of Sunsari District in Nepal. This constituency came into existence on the Constituency Delimitation Commission (CDC) report submitted on 31 August 2017.

== Incorporated areas ==
Sunsari 4 incorporates Koshi Rural Municipality, Bhokraha Rural Municipality, wards 6–11 of Barah Municipality, ward 4 of Ramdhuni Municipality, wards 3, 4 and 8 of Inaruwa Municipality and wards 1, 2 and 4–7 of Harinagara Rural Municipality.

== Assembly segments ==
It encompasses the following Province No. 1 Provincial Assembly segment

- Sunsari 4(A)
- Sunsari 4(B)

== Members of Parliament ==
=== Parliament/Constituent Assembly ===
Election	Member	Party
1991	Khalil Miya	Nepali Congress
1994	Hari Nath Bastola	Nepali Congress
1999	Hari Prasad Sapkota	Nepali Congress
2008	Muga Lal Mahato	Madheshi Janaadhikar Forum, Nepal
June 2009	Muga Lal Mahato	Madheshi Janaadhikar Forum, Nepal (Democratic)
2013	Sitaram Mahato	Nepali Congress
2017	Gyanendra Bahadur Karki	Nepali Congress
2022	Gyanendra Bahadur Karki	Nepali Congress
2026	Deepak Kumar Sah	Rastriya Swatantra Party

=== Provincial Assembly ===
==== 4(A) ====
Election	Member	Party
2017	Jagadish Prasad Kusiyait	CPN (Unified Marxist-Leninist)
May 2018	Jagadish Prasad Kusiyait	Nepal Communist Party

==== 4(B) ====
Election	Member	Party
2017	Mohammad Tahir Miya	Nepali Congress

== Election results ==
=== Election in the 2020s ===
==== 2022 general election ====
Candidate	Party	Votes	%
Gyanendra Bahadur Karki	Nepali Congress	30,483	40.96
Jagdish Prasad Kusiyait	CPN (UML)	30,371	40.81
Bidhyananda Yadav	Rastriya Prajatantra Party	3,232	4.34
Jeevan Kumar Shrestha	Rastriya Swatantra Party	3,181	4.27
Khalid Hussein Haq	Independent	2,457	3.30
Devram Yadav	Janamat Party	2,153	2.89
Kunji Lal Yadav	Loktantrik Samajwadi Party, Nepal	1,373	1.84
Others		1,173	1.58
Total		74,423	100.00
Majority		112	
Nepali Congress hold			

==== 2026 general election ====
Candidate	Party	Votes	%
Deepak Kumar Sah	Rastriya Swatantra Party	42,771	54.51
Gyanendra Bahadur Karki	Nepali Congress	16,587	21.14
Jagdish Prasad Kusiyaith	CPN (UML)	8,631	11.00
Mohammad Mahfuz Ansari	Nepali Communist Party	3,432	4.37
Bishnu Rana	Shram Sanskriti Party	2,763	3.52
Prem Prasad Bhattarai	Rastriya Prajatantra Party	821	1.05
Samid Khan	Rastra Nirman Dal Nepal	735	0.94
Kapleswar Yadav	Janamat Party	558	0.71
Others		2,165	2.76
Total		78,463	100.00
Rastriya Swatantra Party gain from Nepali Congress			

=== Election in the 2010s ===
==== 2017 legislative elections ====
Party	Candidate	Votes
Nepali Congress	Gyanendra Bahadur Karki	32,347
CPN (Unified Marxist–Leninist)	Ramesh Shrestha	25,750
Rastriya Janata Party Nepal	Ram Narayan Yadav	5,020
Nepali Janata Dal	Sitaram Podar	1,089
CPN (Marxist–Leninist)	Santosh Kumar Dahal	1,037
Others		3,073
Invalid votes		7,062
Result	Congress hold	
Source: Election Commission

==== 2017 Nepalese provincial elections ====
===== 4(A) =====
Party	Candidate	Votes
CPN (Unified Marxist–Leninist)	Jagadish Prasad Kusiyait	16,690
Nepali Congress	Rewati Raman Dulal	15,282
Federal Socialist Forum, Nepal	Hari Govinda Yadav	2,523
Others		2,161
Invalid votes		2,391
Result	CPN (UML) gain	
Source: Election Commission

===== 4(B) =====
Party	Candidate	Votes
Nepali Congress	Mohammad Tahir Miya	11,825
CPN (Maoist Centre)	Mohammad Zakir Hussein	7,670
Federal Socialist Forum, Nepal	Manoj Kumar Yadav	6,631
Rastriya Prajatantra Party (Democratic)	Hasbul Miya	2,601
Rastriya Janta Party Nepal	Raghunath Mahato Koiri	1,696
CPN (Marxist–Leninist)	Sunil Kumar Shah Haluwai	1,030
Others		1,206
Invalid votes		3,439
Result	Congress gain	
Source: Election Commission

==== 2013 Constituent Assembly election ====
Party	Candidate	Votes
Nepali Congress	Sitaram Mahato	15,208
CPN (Unified Marxist–Leninist)	Khem Raj Pokharel	10,653
Madheshi Janaadhikar Forum, Nepal (Democratic)	Arbinda Prasad Mehta	7,337
Madheshi Janaadhikar Forum, Nepal	Khalid Hussein Haque	3,585
Sadbhavana Party	Mahichandra Sah	1,282
Rastriya Prajatantra Party Nepal	Dambar Bahadur Ghimire	1,239
UCPN (Maoist)	Haider Ali Miya	1,011
Others		3,003
Result	Congress gain	
Source: NepalNews

=== Election in the 2000s ===
==== 2008 Constituent Assembly election ====
Party	Candidate	Votes
Madheshi Janaadhikar Forum, Nepal	Muga Lal Mahato	19,945
Nepali Congress	Sitaram Mahato	10,929
CPN (Unified Marxist–Leninist)	Parshuram Yadav	8,172
CPN (Maoist)	Surendra Mehta	3,561
Others		4,627
Invalid votes		3,263
Result	MJFN gain	
Source: Election Commission

=== Election in the 1990s ===
==== 1999 legislative elections ====
Party	Candidate	Votes
Nepali Congress	Hari Prasad Sapkota	20,194
CPN (Unified Marxist–Leninist)	Bhim Prasad Acharya	19,631
Rastriya Prajatantra Party	Dil Bahadur Shrestha	9,133
Others		2,100
Invalid Votes		2,631
Result	Congress hold	
Source: Election Commission

==== 1994 legislative elections ====
Party	Candidate	Votes
Nepali Congress	Hari Nath Bastola	16,922
CPN (Unified Marxist–Leninist)	Bhim Prasad Acharya	13,714
Rastriya Prajatantra Party	Dil Bahadur Shrestha	9,561
Others		1,605
Result	Congress hold	
Source: Election Commission

==== 1991 legislative elections ====
Party	Candidate	Votes
Nepali Congress	Khalil Miya	24,350
CPN (Unified Marxist–Leninist)	Upendra Yadav	8,672
Result	Congress gain	

== See also ==
- List of parliamentary constituencies of Nepal
