= Dig Bahadur Limbu =

Nepalese politician

Honourable Dig Bahadur Limbu
- डिग बहादुर लिम्वु

Minister of Youth and Sports
- In office 3 May 2023 – 4 March 2024
- President: Ram Chandra Poudel
- Prime Minister: Pushpa Kamal Dahal
- Preceded by: Maheshwar Jung Gahatraj
- Succeeded by: Biraj Bhakta Shrestha

Member of Parliament, Pratinidhi Sabha
- In office 22 December 2022 – 12 September 2025
- Preceded by: Ghanashyam Khatiwada
- Succeeded by: Yagyamani Neupane
- Constituency: Morang 1

Personal details
- Born: 7 September 1963 (age 62) Morang District
- Party: Nepali Congress
- Spouse: Gangamaya Limbu
- Parent: Prem Bahadur Limbu (father)

Dig Bahadur Limbu is a Nepalese politician, belonging to the Nepali Congress he was a member of the 2nd Federal Parliament of Nepal. Limbu was the Minister of Youth and Sports of Nepal.

In the 2022 Nepalese general election, he won the election from Morang 1 (constituency).
