= Umakanta Gautam =

Nepali politician

Honourable Umakanta Gautam
- उमाकान्त गौतम

Minister of State for Internal Affairs and Law of Koshi Province
- Incumbent
- Assumed office 6 January 2026
- Governor: Parshuram Khapung
- Chief Minister: Hikmat Kumar Karki
- Preceded by: Sunita Kumari Gurung

Member of the Koshi Provincial Assembly
- Incumbent
- Assumed office 26 December 2022
- Preceded by: Kul Prasad Samba
- Constituency: Morang 1(A)

Personal details
- Born: 24 February 1967 (age 59) Nepal
- Party: Communist Party of Nepal (Unified Marxist-Leninist) (before 2018; since 2021)
- Other political affiliations: Nepal Communist Party (2018–2021)
- Spouse: Tanka Dahal

Umakanta Gautam (Nepali: उमाकान्त गौतम) is a Nepalese politician, belonging to the Communist Party of Nepal (Unified Marxist–Leninist) Party. Gautam is currently serving as the Minister of State for Internal Affairs and Law of Koshi Province. He also serves as a member of the Koshi Provincial Assembly and was elected from Morang 1(A) constituency.

== Electoral history ==
=== 2022 provincial election ===
==== Morang 1 (A) ====
Candidate	Party	Votes	%
Umakanta Gautam	CPN (UML)	13,531	36.64
Kul Prasad Samba	CPN (Maoist Centre)	10,004	27.09
Purna Bahadur Waiwa Tamang	Rastriya Prajatantra Party	9,184	24.87
Shiv Kumar Rai	Mongol National Organisation	2,242	6.07
Others		1,965	5.32
Total		36,926	100.00
Majority		3,527	
CPN (UML)			
Source: Election Commission
