= First Uddhav Thapa cabinet =

5th Government of Koshi Province from 7 July to 2 August 2023

- 5th Cabinet of Koshi Province
- Hon'ble Chief Minister Uddhav Thapa
- Date formed: 7 July 2023
- Date dissolved: 2 August 2023

People and organisations
- Governor: Parshuram Khapung
- Chief Minister: Uddhav Thapa
- No. of ministers: 6
- Member parties: Nepali Congress Coalition partner; Maoist Centre; Unified Socialist External Support; PSP-N
- Status in legislature: Majority Coalition Government (July - September 2023)
- Opposition party: CPN (UML)
- Opposition leader: Hikmat Kumar Karki, CPN (UML)

History
- Election: 2022
- Legislature term: 5 years
- Predecessor: First Hikmat Kumar Karki cabinet
- Successor: Second Uddhav Thapa cabinet

The Uddhav Thapa cabinet was the 5th provincial government of Koshi Province. It was formed after Uddhav Thapa was sworn in as Chief Minister of Koshi Province on 7 July 2023 as previous Chief minister, Hikmat Kumar Karki failed to win vote of confidence.

== History ==
Uddhav Thapa became Chief Minister after then incumbent cm Hikmat Kumar Karki failed to secure vote of confidence. Thapa claimed majority of 47 seats (including the Speaker) to become CM. Karki filed a petition in Supreme court against Thapa for including the Speaker in government formation, which they seemed unconstitutional. The supreme ruled against Thapa by removing him from the post.

== Ministries ==
S.N.	Portfolio	Minister	Party	Assumed office	Left office
Cabinet ministers
1	Chief Minister; All other ministries not allocated to anyone.	Uddhav Thapa	Congress	7 July 2023	2 August 2023
2	Minister for Economic Affairs and Planning	Jivan Acharya	Maoist Centre	9 July 2023	2 August 2023
3	Minister without portfolio	Pradeep Kumar Sunuwar	Congress	7 July 2023	2 August 2023
4	Minister without portfolio	Ram Kumar Khatri	Congress	9 July 2023	2 August 2023
5	Minister without portfolio	Rajendra Karki	Maoist Centre	9 July 2023	2 August 2023
6	Minister without portfolio	Kamal Prasad Jabegu	Unified Socialist	7 July 2023	2 August 2023
