= Ministry of Social Development (Koshi Province) =

Nepal government ministry

- सामाजिक विकास मन्त्रालय

Agency overview
- Formed: February 2018; 7 years ago
- Jurisdiction: Government of Koshi Province
- Headquarters: Biratnagar, Morang District
- Minister responsible: Kedar Karki, Minister
- Deputy Minister responsible: vacant, State Minister
- Agency executive: Vasudev Dahal, Secretary
- Website: mosd.koshi.gov.np

The Ministry of Social Development is a governmental body of Koshi Province responsible for the welfare of the society and does all social development work. Its purpose is to take care of the development work related to the social development of the society.

== Background ==
According to the constitution of Nepal, the provinces have been established in the Federal Democratic Republic of Nepal, as provided for in the three-tier government structure. Koshi province is one of the seven provinces in Nepal. There are 14 districts (Bhojpur, Dhankuta, Ilam, Jhapa, Khotang, Morang, Okhaldhunga, Panchthar, Sankhuwasabha, Solukhumbu, Sunsari, Taplejung, Terhathum and Udayapur), one metropolitan city, and two sub-metropolitan cities. There are a total of 49 local levels consisting of municipalities and 88 rural municipalities.

After Nepal was transformed into a federal structure and the system of union, state and local government was completed in the year 2017, the three-level elections were completed and the provincial government was formed. The Ministry of Social Development was established in 2018 February with the responsibility of carrying out work in the social sector among the various ministries under the government of Koshi Province. At the time of establishment, according to the provincial government, Koshi Province (Division of Work) Regulations 2074, this ministry was assigned the responsibility of subjects related to education, women, children, senior citizens, disabled, social security, language, culture, archeology, labor and employment. The creation of provincial level laws and policy standards for various subjects within the scope of this ministry.

== List of ministers of social development ==
This is a list of all former Social Development Ministers since 2018.

Jeevan Ghimire	15 February 2018	27 December 2020
Usha Kala Rai	27 March 2021	26 August 2021
Bal Bahadur Samsohang	26 August 2021	1 November 2021
Rajan Rai	6 February 2022	9 January 2023
Buddhi Kumar Rajbhandari	13 January 2023	7 July 2023
