= Minister of Social Development =

Minister of Social Development and similar phrases may refer to:

- Minister of Social Development (Canada)
- Minister of Social Development (South Africa)
- Minister for Social Development (New Zealand)
- Minister for Social Development (Koshi Province)

== See also ==
- Ministry of Social Development (disambiguation)
