= Bhojpur 1 =

Parliamentary constituency in Nepal

- भोजपुर १
- Parliamentary constituency for the House of Representatives
- Bhojpur 1 in Koshi Province
- Province: Koshi Province
- District: Bhojpur District
- Population: 182,459
- Electorate: 106,534

Current constituency
- Created: 1991
- Seats: 1
- Member of Parliament: Sudan Kirati, Maoist Centre
- Koshi MPA 1(A): Rajendra Kumar Rai, Unified Socialist
- Koshi MPA 1(B): Binod Rai, Congress

Bhojpur 1 is the parliamentary constituency of Bhojpur District in Nepal. This constituency came into existence on the Constituency Delimitation Commission (CDC) report submitted on 31 August 2017.

== Incorporated areas ==
Bhojpur 1 incorporates the entirety of Bhojpur District.

== Assembly segments ==
It encompasses the following Province No. 1 Provincial Assembly segment

- Bhojpur 1(A)
- Bhojpur 1(B)

== Members of Parliament ==
=== Parliament/Constituent Assembly ===
Election	Member	Party
1991	Narendra Basnet	CPN (UML)
1994	Hem Raj Rai	CPN (UML)
1999	Ghanendra Basnet	CPN (UML)
2008	Padam Bahadur Rai	CPN (Maoist)
January 2009	Padam Bahadur Rai	Maoist Centre
2013	Kripasur Sherpa	CPN (UML)
2017	Sudan Kirati	Maoist Centre
May 2018	Sudan Kirati	NCP
March 2021	Sudan Kirati	Maoist Centre

=== Provincial Assembly ===
==== 1(A) ====
Election	Member	Party
2017	Rajendra Kumar Rai	CPN (UML)
May 2018	Rajendra Kumar Rai	NCP
March 2021	Rajendra Kumar Rai	CPN (UML)
August 2021	Rajendra Kumar Rai	Unified Socialist

==== 1(B) ====
Election	Member	Party
2017	Sher Dhan Rai	CPN (UML)
May 2018	Sher Dhan Rai	NCP
April 2021	Sher Dhan Rai	CPN (UML)
2022	Binod Rai	Congress

== Election results ==
=== Election in the 2020s ===
==== 2026 general election ====
Candidate	Party	Votes	%
Dhrubaraj Rai	SSP	16,663	31.01
Sher Dhan Rai	CPN (UML)	14,750	27.45
Balkrishna Thapa	NP	8,670	16.14
Ramesh Prasad Ojha	RSP	6,102	11.36
Ajambar Kangmang Rai	NCP	5,728	10.66
Others		1,815	3.38
Total		53,728	100.00
Majority		1,913	
SSP gain			

==== 2022 general election ====
Candidate	Party	Votes	%
Sudan Kirati	CPN (Maoist Centre)	28,591	48.72
Sher Dhan Rai	CPN (UML)	26,202	44.65
Suresh Basnet	Nepalka Lagi Nepali Party	1,087	1.85
Others		2,805	4.78
Total		58,685	100.00
Majority		2,389	
CPN (Maoist Centre) hold			

==== 2022 provincial election ====
===== 1(A) =====
Candidate	Party	Votes	%
Rajendra Kumar Rai	Unified Socialist	16,118	51.98
Hari Bahadur Rai	CPN (UML)	12,226	39.43
Maniraj Rai	PSP-N	975	3.14
Others	1,689	5.45	
Total		31,008	100.00
Majority		3,892	
Unified Socialist			

===== 1(B) =====
Candidate	Party	Votes	%
Binod Rai	Nepali Congress	13,590	47.94
Khadga Bahadur Karki	CPN (UML)	12,836	45.28
Aas Kumar Rai	PSP-N	1,303	4.60
Others	617	2.18	
Total		28,346	100.00
Majority		754	
Nepali Congress			

=== Election in the 2010s ===
==== 2017 legislative elections ====
Candidate	Party	Votes	%
Sudan Kirati	Maoist Centre	34,394	56.92
Umesh Jang Rayamajhi	Nepali Congress	21,696	35.91
Anil Basnet	CPN (Marxist–Leninist)	2,601	4.30
Others		1,733	2.87
Total		60,424	100.00
Valid votes		60,424	91.69
Invalid/blank votes		5,475	8.31
Total votes		65,899	100.00
Majority		12,698	
Maoist Centre gain			
Source: Election Commission

==== 2017 Nepalese provincial elections ====
===== 1(A) =====
Candidate	Party	Votes	%
Rajendra Kumar Rai	CPN (UML)	19,297	59.22
Ajambar Rai Kangmang	FSF-N	11,541	35.42
Others		1,749	5.37
Total		32,587	100.00
Valid votes		32,587	93.27
Invalid/blank votes		2,351	6.73
Total votes		34,938	100.00
Majority		7,756	
CPN (UML) gain			
Source: Election Commission

===== 1(B) =====
Candidate	Party	Votes	%
Sher Dhan Rai	CPN (UML)	20,334	71.23
Govinda Bahadur Karki	Nepali Congress	7,105	24.89
Others		1,106	3.87
Total		28,545	100.00
Valid votes		28,545	92.14
Invalid/blank votes		2,434	7.86
Total votes		30,979	100.00
Majority		13,229	
CPN (UML) gain			
Source: Election Commission

==== 2013 Constituent Assembly election ====
Candidate	Party	Votes	%
Kripasur Sherpa	CPN (UML)	11,450	37.75
Dharma Raj Rai	Nepali Congress	8,970	29.57
Ajambar Rai Kangmang	Federal Socialist Party, Nepal	4,066	13.41
Khem Raj Nepali	UCPN (Maoist)	3,567	11.76
Others		2,277	7.51
Total		30,330	100.00
Majority		2,480	
CPN (UML) gain			
Source: Election Commission

=== Election in the 2000s ===
==== 2008 Constituent Assembly election ====
Candidate	Party	Votes	%
Padam Bahadur Rai	CPN (Maoist)	15,796	40.36
Gyanendra Bahadur Karki	Nepali Congress	13,582	34.71
Jayant Rai	CPN (UML)	7,515	19.20
Others		2,241	5.73
Total		39,134	100.00
Valid votes		39,134	93.91
Invalid/blank votes		2,537	6.09
Total votes		41,671	100.00
Majority		2,214	
CPN (Maoist) gain			
Source: Election Commission

=== Election in the 1990s ===
==== 1999 legislative elections ====
Candidate	Party	Votes	%
Ghanendra Basnet	CPN (UML)	15,443	36.40
Gyanendra Bahadur Karki	Nepali Congress	14,605	34.42
Mukunda Bahadur Basnet	Independent	5,586	13.17
Narendra Basnet	CPN (Marxist–Leninist)	4,048	9.54
Jagan Bahadur Rai	Janamukti Party Nepal	1,615	3.81
Others		1,133	2.67
Total		42,430	100.00
Valid votes		42,430	97.57
Invalid/blank votes		1,058	2.43
Total votes		43,488	100.00
Majority		838	
CPN (UML) hold			
Source: Election Commission

==== 1994 legislative elections ====
Candidate	Party	Votes	%
Hem Raj Rai	CPN (UML)	15,974	43.09
Gyanendra Bahadur Karki	Nepali Congress	15,948	43.02
Babu Ram Basnet	Rastriya Prajatantra Party	3,496	9.43
Others		1,654	4.46
Total		37,072	100.00
Majority		26	
CPN (UML) hold			
Source: Election Commission

==== 1991 legislative elections ====
Candidate	Party	Votes	%
Narendra Basnet	CPN (UML)	13,279	63.47
Laxmi Rai	Nepali Congress	7,642	36.53
Total		20,921	100.00
Majority		5,637	
CPN (UML) gain			

== See also ==
- List of parliamentary constituencies of Nepal
