= Deepak Kumar Sah =

Minister of Industry, Commerce and Supplies of Nepal since 2026

Minister of Industry, Commerce and Supplies
- Incumbent
- Assumed office 10 September 2026
- President: Ram Chandra Poudel
- Prime Minister: Balendra Shah
- Preceded by: Gauri Kumari Yadav

Member of Parliament, Pratinidhi Sabha
- Incumbent
- Assumed office 26 March 2026
- Preceded by: Gyanendra Bahadur Karki
- Constituency: Sunsari 4

Personal details
- Born: 28 May 1976 (age 50)
- Party: Rastriya Swatantra Party
- Other political affiliations: Janamat Party (until 2025)
- Education: Tribhuvan University; Nepal Open University
- Occupation: Engineer, politician
- Website: https://deepakkumarsah.com.np/

Deepak Kumar Sah (born 28 May 1976) is a Nepalese politician serving as the Minister of Industry, Commerce and Supplies in the government led by prime minister Balen Shah.

He is a member of the 3rd Federal Parliament of Nepal, elected from Sunsari 4 constituency in the 2026 general election, securing 42,771 votes and defeating his closest competitor Gyanendra Bahadur Karki, former minister from the Nepali Congress with the difference of 35.30%.

== Career ==
Prior to his political career, Sah worked as an engineer.

Sah was involved in the formation of the Janamat Party and served as its vice-chair and chair of its Disciplinary Commission. Sah was expelled from the Janamat Party after conflicts with other party leadership. He formed the Janaswaraj Party with other former Janamat Party members. The party faced legal challenges from the Janamat Party was dissolved after it did not receive legal recognition. Sah then formed the Sarvodaya Party, which then merged into the Rastriya Swatantra Party.

He was first elected to Parliament in the 2026 general election, representing the Sunsari 4 constituency under the Rastriya Swatantra Party. He was appointed Minister of Industry, Commerce and Supplies in September 2026 after Gauri Kumari Yadav resigned from the position.

== Electoral performance ==
Election	Year	Constituency	Contested for	Political party	Result	Votes	% of votes
Nepal general election	2026	Sunsari 4	House of Representatvies (Federal Parliament)	Rastriya Swatantra Party	Won	42,771	54.51%
