= Minister for Industry, Agriculture and Cooperatives (Koshi Province) =

Head of the Ministry of Industry, Agriculture and Cooperatives

- उद्योग,कृषि तथा सहकारी मन्त्री
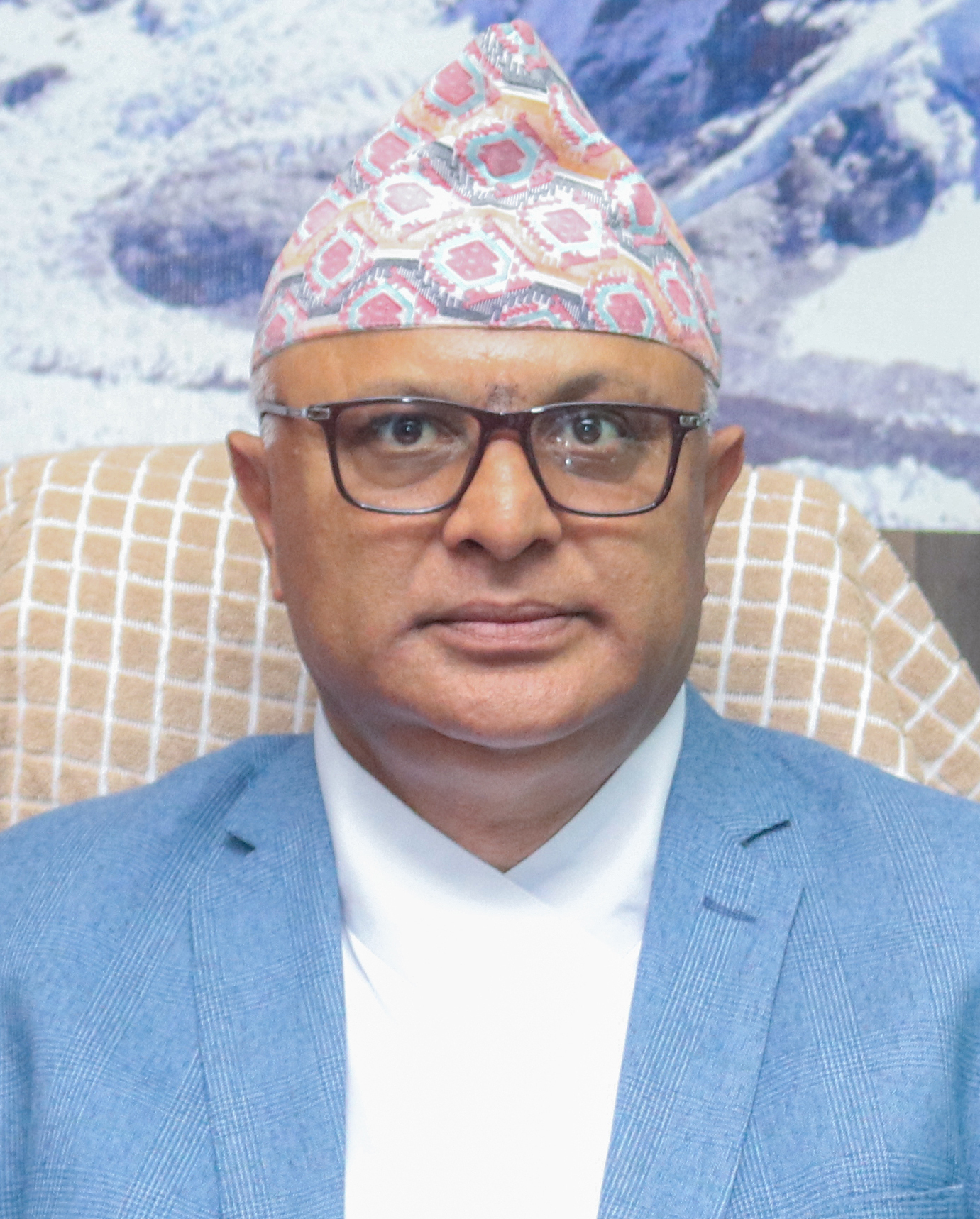
- Incumbent; Hikmat Kumar Karki since 9 May 2024
- Ministry of Industry, Agriculture and Cooperatives
- Style: Honourable; Mr. Minister
- Member of: Koshi Provincial; Cabinet
- Reports to: Chief Minister; Koshi Provincial
- Nominator: Chief Minister
- Appointer: Governor
- Term length: No fixed term
- Constituting instrument: Constitution of Nepal
- Inaugural holder: Sher Dhan Rai
- Formation: 15 February 2018 (8 years ago)
- Deputy: Minister of State for Industry, Agriculture and Cooperatives

The Minister for Industry, Agriculture and Cooperatives (Nepali: उद्योग,कृषि तथा सहकारी मन्त्री) is the head of the Ministry of Industry, Agriculture and Cooperatives of the Government of Koshi Province. One of the senior-most officers in the Provincial Cabinet, the minister is responsible for promoting the cooperative sector in national development and adopting policies related to agriculture and land reform, realising the need for land management, formulation implementation and regulation of land management in Koshi Province.

The Incumbent, minister has been Chief Minister Hikmat Kumar Karki, who took office on 9 May 2024.

== List of office-holders ==
N°	Minister		Party	Term of office			District of residence	Chief Minister(s)	Ref
N°	Portrait	Name	Party	Took office	Left office	Term	District of residence	Chief Minister(s)	Ref
Minister for Land Management, Agriculture and Cooperatives
1		Sher Dhan Rai	CPN (Unified Marxist–Leninist)	February 15, 2018	March 27, 2021	3 years, 40 days	Bhojpur	Sher Dhan Rai	
2		Ram Bahadur Ranamagar	CPN (Unified Marxist–Leninist)	March 27, 2021	August 26, 2021	152 days	Ilam	Sher Dhan Rai	
3		Bhim Acharya	CPN (Unified Marxist–Leninist)	August 26, 2021	September 15, 2021	20 days	Sunsari	Bhim Acharya	
4		Hira Kumar Thapa	CPN (Unified Marxist–Leninist)	September 15, 2021	November 1, 2021	47 days	Jhapa	Bhim Acharya	
Minister for Agriculture
5		Jhalak Bahadur Magar	CPN (Maoist Centre)	February 6, 2021	January 9, 2023	1 year, 337 days	Jhapa	Rajendra Kumar Rai	
Minister for Industry, Agriculture and Cooperative
6		Bhakti Prasad Sitaula	Rastriya Prajatantra Party	January 9, 2023	July 7, 2023	179 days	Jhapa	Hikmat Kumar Karki	
7		Uddhav Thapa	Nepali Congress	July 7, 2023	August 2, 2023	26 days	Jhapa	himself	
7		Uddhav Thapa	Nepali Congress	August 2, 2023	September 8, 2023	37 days	Jhapa	himself	
