= Sudan Kirati =

Member of Parliament(MP)

Honourable Sudan Kirati
- सुदन किराती

Mato Minister of Culture, Tourism and Civil Aviation
- In office 17 January 2023 – 6 March 2024
- President: Bidhya Devi Bhandari; Ram Chandra Poudel
- Prime Minister: Pushpa Kamal Dahal
- Deputy: Sushila Sirpali Thakuri
- Preceded by: Jeevan Ram Shrestha
- Succeeded by: Hit Bahadur Tamang

Member of Parliament, Pratinidhi Sabha
- Incumbent
- Assumed office 4 March 2018
- Preceded by: Kripasur Sherpa
- Constituency: Bhojpur 1
- In office 28 May 2008 – 28 May 2012
- Preceded by: Sher Dhan Rai
- Succeeded by: Sher Dhan Rai
- Constituency: Bhojpur 2

Personal details
- Born: 24 February 1979 (age 47)
- Party: Shram Sanskriti Party

Sudan Kirati is a Nepalese politician and a former Mato Minister of Culture, Tourism and Civil Aviation of Nepal. Currently he belongs to Shram Sanskriti Party which he joined on 8 May, 2026. He was previously affiliated to CPN (Maoist Centre) after which he joined Pragatisheel Loktantrik Party. He is a former member of the dissolved Pratinidhi Sabha. In the 2017 Nepalese general election he was elected from the Bhojpur 1 constituency, securing 34,394 (56.92%) votes when he got re elected in 2022.

== Electoral history ==
=== 2022 general election ===
Candidate	Party	Votes	%
Sudan Kirati	CPN (Maoist Centre)	28,591	48.72
Sher Dhan Rai	CPN (UML)	26,202	44.65
Suresh Basnet	Nepalka Lagi Nepali Party	1,087	1.85
Others		2,805	4.78
Total		58,685	100.00
Majority		2,389	
CPN (Maoist Centre) hold			

=== 2017 legislative elections ===
Candidate	Party	Votes	%
Sudan Kirati	Maoist Centre	34,394	56.92
Umesh Jang Rayamajhi	Nepali Congress	21,696	35.91
Anil Basnet	CPN (Marxist–Leninist)	2,601	4.30
Others		1,733	2.87
Total		60,424	100.00
Valid votes		60,424	91.69
Invalid/blank votes		5,475	8.31
Total votes		65,899	100.00
Majority		12,698	
Maoist Centre gain			
Source: Election Commission

== See also ==
- Pragatisheel Loktantrik Party
