= Ministry of Physical Infrastructure Development (Koshi Province) =

Nepal province ministry

- भौतिक पूर्वाधार विकास मन्त्रालय
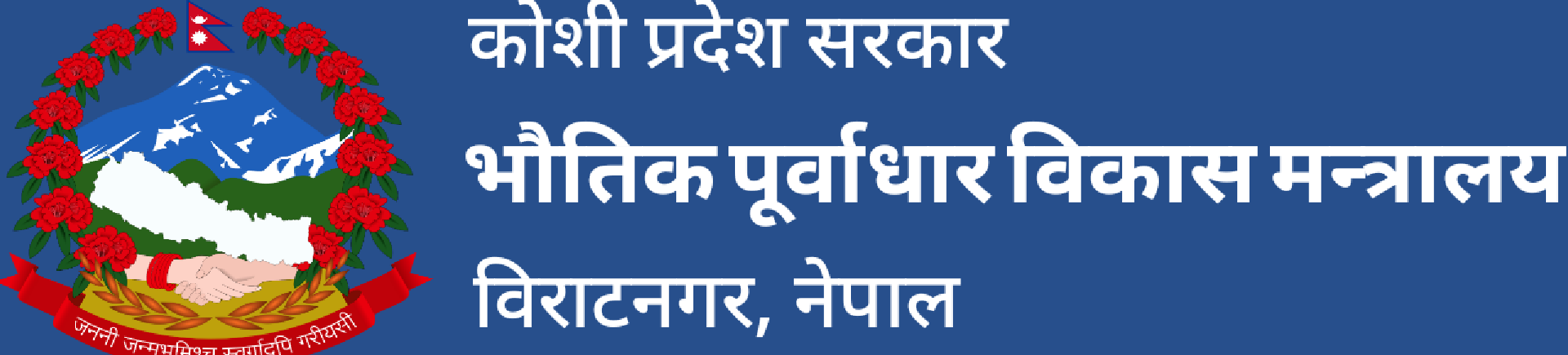
- Logo of Ministry of Physical Infrastructure Development

Agency overview
- Formed: 15 February 2018; 8 years ago
- Jurisdiction: Government of Koshi Province
- Headquarters: Biratnagar, Morang District
- Minister responsible: Pradip Kumar Sunuwar
- Minister of State responsible: Shobha Chemjong, Minister of State
- Agency executive: Milan Acharya, Secretary
- Website: mopid.koshi.gov.np

The Ministry of Physical Infrastructure Development is a governmental body of Koshi Province, Nepal mainly responsible for the construction and development of basic physical infrastructure including roads, bridges, buildings and urban development.

== Introduction ==
After Nepal was transformed into a federal structure as envisioned by the Constitution of Nepal, according to the provisions related to the Provincial Executive in Part 13 of the Constitution, the Provincial Council of Ministers was formed on 15 February 2018.

The Ministry of Physical Infrastructure Development was established on 15 February 2018. On 2 November 2021 the portfolio of Urban development was added to the ministry resulting in the inclusion of the Ministry of Physical Infrastructure and Urban Development. Recently, according to the decision of the provincial government (council of ministers), the name of this ministry has been changed to Ministry of Physical Infrastructure Development.

== List of former ministers ==
This is a list of all former Social Development Ministers since 2018–Present.

Himal Karki	2 November 2021	9 January 2023
Durga Prasad Chapagain	13 January 2023	
Kamal Prasad Jabegu	2 August 2023	8 September 2023
Ekraj Karki	8 September 2023	14 October 2023
Kamal Prasad Jabegu	3 November 2023	Incumbent
