= Morang 1 =

Parliamentary constituency in Nepal

- Parliamentary constituency
- Morang 1 in Province No. 1
- Province: Province No. 1
- District: Morang District

Current constituency
- Created: 1991
- Party: Rastriya Swatantra Party
- Member of Parliament: Yagyamani Neupane
- Member of the Provincial Assembly: Umakanta Gautam, Communist Party of Nepal (UML)
- Member of the Provincial Assembly: Khadka Bahadur Basnet, Communist Party of Nepal (UML)

Morang 1 is one of six parliamentary constituencies of Morang District in Nepal. This constituency came into existence on the Constituency Delimitation Commission (CDC) report submitted on 31 August 2017.

== Incorporated areas ==
Morang 1 incorporates Urlabari Municipality, Miklajung Rural Municipality, Kerabari Rural Municipality and Letang Municipality.

== Assembly segments ==
It encompasses the following Province No. 1 Provincial Assembly segment

- Morang 1(A)
- Morang 1(B)

== Members of Parliament ==
=== Parliament/Constituent Assembly ===
Election	Member	Party
1991	Girija Prasad Koirala	Nepali Congress
1999 by-election	Amod Prasad Upadhyaya	Nepali Congress
2013	Rishikesh Pokharel	CPN (Unified Marxist–Leninist)
2017	Ghanashyam Khatiwada	CPN (Unified Marxist–Leninist)
May 2018	Ghanashyam Khatiwada	Nepal Communist Party
March 2021	Ghanashyam Khatiwada	CPN (Unified Marxist–Leninist)
2022	Dig Bahadur Limbu	Nepali Congress
2026	Yagyamani Neupane	Rastriya Swatantra Party

=== Provincial Assembly ===
==== 1(A) ====
Election	Member	Party
2017	Kul Prasad Samba	CPN (Maoist Centre)
May 2018	Kul Prasad Samba	Nepal Communist Party
March 2021	Kul Prasad Samba	CPN (Maoist Centre)

==== 1(B) ====
Election	Member	Party
2017	Upendra Prasad Ghimire	CPN (Unified Marxist-Leninist)
May 2018	Upendra Prasad Ghimire	Nepal Communist Party
March 2021	Upendra Prasad Ghimire	CPN (Unified Marxist–Leninist)
August 2021	Upendra Prasad Ghimire	CPN (Unified Socialist)

== Election results ==
=== Election in the 2020s ===
==== 2026 general election ====
Candidate	Party	Votes	%
Yagyamani Neupane	RSP	27,367	37.89
Shanti Pakhrin Lama	SSP	17,522	24.26
Khadga Bahadur Phago	Congress	11,986	16.59
Ghanashyam Khatiwada	CPN (UML)	9,823	13.60
Kulprasad Samba	NCP	2,224	3.08
Others		3,308	4.58
Total		72,230	100.00
Registered voters/turnout			–
Majority		9,845	
RSP gain			

==== 2022 general election ====
Candidate	Party	Votes	%
Dig Bahadur Limbu	Nepali Congress	27,297	38.62
Ghanashyam Khatiwada	CPN (UML)	26,867	38.01
Kamal Bahadur Shrestha	Rastriya Swatantra Party	8,063	11.41
Hom Nath Gautam	Rastriya Prajatantra Party	4,667	6.60
Suraj Limbu	Mongol National Organisation	2,218	3.14
Others		1,564	2.21
Total		70,676	100.00
Majority		430	
Nepali Congress gain			

=== Election in the 2010s ===
==== 2017 legislative elections ====
Party	Candidate	Votes
CPN (Unified Marxist–Leninist)	Ghanashyam Khatiwada	37,524
Nepali Congress	Dig Bahadur Limbu	31,436
Sanghiya Loktantrik Rastriya Manch	Ashok Chemjong	1,152
Others		1,315
Invalid votes		3,277
Result	CPN (UML) gain	
Source: Election Commission

==== 2017 Nepalese provincial elections ====
===== 1(A) =====
Party	Candidate	Votes
CPN (Maoist Centre)	Kul Prasad Samba	19,554
Nepali Congress	Lalit Adhikari	14,263
Others		3,250
Invalid votes		1,429
Result	Maoist Centre gain	
Source: Election Commission

===== 1(B) =====
Party	Candidate	Votes
CPN (Unified Marxist–Leninist)	Upendra Prasad Ghimire	17,117
Nepali Congress	Ishwari Koirala	14,310
Sanghiya Loktantrik Rastriya Manch	Nagendra Bahadur Limbu	1,124
Others		1,232
Invalid votes		1,478
Result	CPN (UML) gain	
Source: Election Commission

==== 2013 Constituent Assembly election ====
Party	Candidate	Votes
CPN (Unified Marxist–Leninist)	Rishikesh Pokharel	14,000
Nepali Congress	Amod Prasad Upadhyaya	10,940
UCPN (Maoist)	Ganesh Prasad Upreti	6,501
Madheshi Janaadhikar Forum, Nepal	Binod Kumar SIngh Gangai	3,359
Madheshi Janaadhikar Forum, Nepal (Democratic)	Mohammad Mehtab Alam	2,048
Sadbhavana Party	Abdul Raheem Miya	1,295
Others		2,832
Result	CPN (UML) gain	
Source: NepalNews

=== Election in the 2000s ===
==== 2008 Constituent Assembly election ====
Party	Candidate	Votes
Nepali Congress	Amod Prasad Upadhyaya	11,105
CPN (Unified Marxist–Leninist)	Ganga Devi Dangi	8,799
Madheshi Janaadhikar Forum, Nepal	Tulu Ram Rajbanshi	7,710
CPN (Maoist)	Shanta Maya Rai	6,945
Sadbhavana Party	Abdul Raheem Miya	6,165
CPN (Marxist–Leninist)	Tulsi Prasad Siwakoti	1,422
Rastriya Prajatantra Party	Ratna Rai	1,036
Others		2,515
Invalid votes		3,475
Result	Congress hold	
Source: Election Commission

=== Election in the 1990s ===
==== 1999 by-elections ====
Candidate	Party	Votes	%
Amod Prasad Upadhyaya	Nepali Congress	26,501	53.38
Ram Kumar Rai	CPN (UML)	12,601	25.38
Bisheshwor Rajbanshi	Nepal Sadbhawana Party	6,881	13.86
Hasan Imam	CPN (ML)	1,911	3.85
Jayanath Prasad Chaudhary	Rastriya Prajatantra Party	1,216	2.45
Prashannalal Singh	Independent	283	0.57
Dukhailal Singh	Independent	177	0.36
Niresh Kumar Mandal	Independent	79	0.16
Total		49,649	100.00
Valid votes		49,649	97.83
Invalid/blank votes		1,101	2.17
Total votes		50,750	100.00
Majority		13,900	
Nepali Congress hold			

==== 1999 legislative elections ====
Party	Candidate	Votes
Nepali Congress	Girija Prasad Koirala	22,165
CPN (Unified Marxist–Leninist)	Bharat Mohan Adhikari	15,648
Nepal Sadbhawana Party	Badri Prasad Mandal	9,849
Rastriya Prajatantra Party	Lain Bahadur Khadka	1,594
CPN (Marxist–Leninist)	Dhruba Narayan Shrestha	1,552
Others		338
Invalid Votes		1,184
Result	Congress hold	
Source: Election Commission

==== 1994 legislative elections ====
Party	Candidate	Votes
Nepali Congress	Girija Prasad Koirala	21,013
CPN (Unified Marxist–Leninist)	Tulu Ram Rajbanshi	12,987
Nepal Sadbhawana Party	Bisheshwar Rajbanshi	6,650
Rastriya Prajatantra Party	Bhim Devi Oli	1,997
Others		1,492
Result	Congress hold	
Source: Election Commission

==== 1991 legislative elections ====
Party	Candidate	Votes
Nepali Congress	Girija Prasad Koirala	16,403
CPN (Unified Marxist–Leninist)	Laba Pradhan	11,314
Result	Congress gain	

== See also ==
- List of parliamentary constituencies of Nepal
