= Yagyamani Neupane =

Nepalese Politician and Lawyer

The Honourable Yagyamani Neupane
- यज्ञमणि न्यौपाने

Member of Parliament, Pratinidhi Sabha
- Elected
- Assumed office 27 March 2026
- Preceded by: Dig Bahadur Limbu
- Constituency: Morang 1

Personal details
- Party: Rastriya Swatantra Party
- Education: Nepal Law Campus (LLB); Political Science(Msc)
- Profession: Politician; Lawyer

Yagyamani Neupane (Note: Nepali: यज्ञमणि न्यौपाने) is a Nepalese politician and lawyer serving as a member of parliament from the Rastriya Swatantra Party. He is the member of the 3rd Federal Parliament of Nepal elected from Morang 1 constituency in 2026 Nepalese General Election securing 27,367 votes and defeating nearest rival Shanti Pakhrin of Shram Sanskriti Party. He was a former lawyer resigned from his position as president of the Independent Lawyers’ Forum in March 2026. Previously, He served as a deputy chairman of Disciplinary Commission of Rastriya Swatantra Party. He holds LLB from Nepal Law Campus.
