= Minister for Internal Affairs and Law (Koshi Province) =

- आन्तरिक मामिला तथा कानून मन्त्रालय
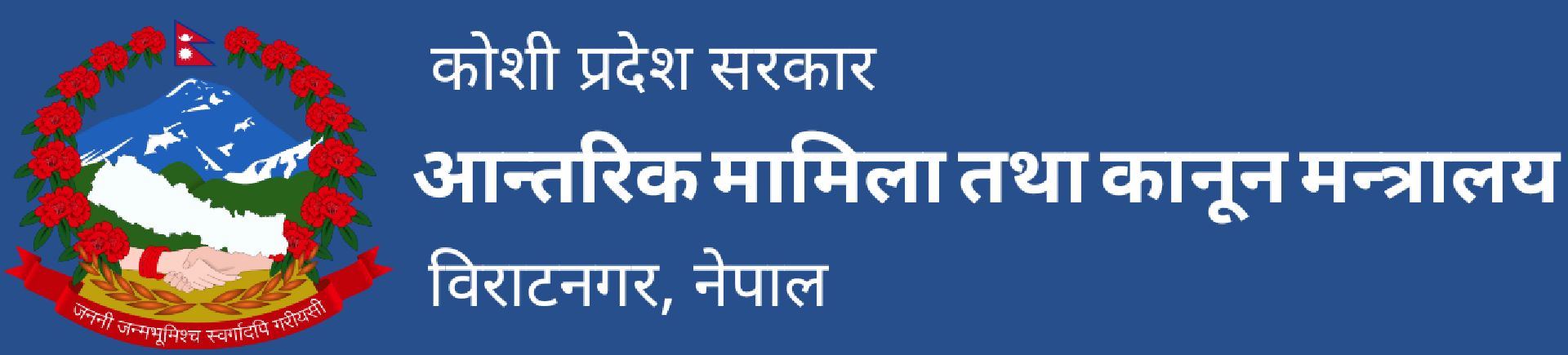
- Emblem of Ministry of Internal Affairs and Law
- Incumbent; Indra Mani Parajuli since 6 January 2026
- Ministry of Internal Affairs and Law
- Style: Honourable; Mr. Minister
- Member of: Koshi Provincial; Cabinet
- Reports to: Chief Minister; Koshi Provincial
- Nominator: Chief Minister
- Appointer: Governor
- Term length: No fixed term
- Constituting instrument: Constitution of Nepal
- Inaugural holder: Hikmat Kumar Karki
- Formation: 15 February 2018 (8 years ago)

The Minister for Internal Affairs and Law (or simply, the Internal Minister, (Nepali: आन्तरिक मामिला तथा कानून मन्त्री) is the head of the Ministry of Internal Affairs and Law of the Government of Koshi Province. One of the senior-most officers in the Provincial Cabinet, the minister is responsible for maintain peace and state security; the state's police force and investigation bureau comes under its jurisdiction. Occasionally, they are assisted by the Minister of State for Internal Affairs and Law.

The Incumbent, minister is Indra Mani Parajuli, who took office on 6 January 2026.

== List of office-holders ==
N°	Minister		Party	Term of office			District of residence	Chief Minister(s)	Ref
N°	Portrait	Name	Party	Took office	Left office	Term	District of residence	Chief Minister(s)	Ref
1		Hikmat Kumar Karki	CPN (Unified Marxist–Leninist)	February 15, 2018	August 26, 2021	3 years, 192 days	Jhapa	Sher Dhan Rai	
2		Bhim Acharya	CPN (Unified Marxist–Leninist)	August 26, 2021	November 1, 2021	67 days	Sunsari	himself	
3		Kedar Karki	Nepali Congress	November 2, 2021	January 9, 2023	1 year, 68 days	Morang	Rajendra Kumar Rai	
(1)		Hikmat Kumar Karki	CPN (Unified Marxist–Leninist)	January 9, 2023	July 7, 2023	179 days	Jhapa	himself	
4		Uddhav Thapa	Nepali Congress	July 7, 2023	August 2, 2023	26 days	Jhapa	himself	
4		Uddhav Thapa	Nepali Congress	August 2, 2023	September 8, 2023	37 days	Jhapa	himself	
(1)		Hikmat Kumar Karki	CPN (Unified Marxist–Leninist)	September 8, 2023	September 25, 2023	17 days	Jhapa	himself	
5		Lila Ballav Adhikari	CPN (Unified Marxist–Leninist)	September 25, 2023	October 15, 2023	20 days	Morang	Hikmat Kumar Karki	
6		Shamsher Rai	Nepali Congress	15 October, 2023		2 years, 327 days	Ilam	Kedar Karki	
