= Sitaram Mahato =

Nepalese politician

- सिताराम महतो

Member of Parliament, Pratinidhi Sabha
- Incumbent
- Assumed office 4 March 2018
- Preceded by: Rewati Raman Bhandari
- Constituency: Sunsari 2

Member of Constituent Assembly
- In office 21 January 2014 – 14 October 2017
- Preceded by: Muga Lal Mahato
- Succeeded by: Gyanendra Bahadur Karki
- Constituency: Sunsari 4

Personal details
- Born: May 19, 1955 (age 70)
- Party: Nepali Congress
- Other political affiliations: Nepali Congress (Democratic)

Sitaram Mahato is a Nepalese Politician, former state minister and serving as the Member Of House Of Representatives (Nepal) elected from Sunsari-2, Province No. 1. He is member of the Nepali Congress.
