= Rajan Rai =

Nepalese politician

- राजन राई

Minister for Social Development of Koshi Province
- In office 6 February 2021 – 9 January 2023
- Governor: Somnath Adhikari; Parshuram Khapung
- Chief Minister: Rajendra Kumar Rai
- Preceded by: Bal Bahadur Samsohang
- Succeeded by: Buddhi Kumar Rajbhandari

Member of the Koshi Provincial Assembly
- In office 31 January 2018 – 18 September 2022
- Preceded by: Constituency created
- Succeeded by: Panch Karna Rai
- Constituency: Khotang 1(A)

Personal details
- Born: Khotang, Nepal
- Party: CPN (Unified Socialist)

Rajan Rai (Nepali: राजन राई) is a Nepalese politician belonging to CPN (Unified Socialist). He is also serving as member of Provincial Assembly.

He is currently serving as Minister for Social Development of Province No. 1.

== Electoral history ==
=== 2017 Nepalese provincial elections ===
Khotang 1(A)
Party	Candidate	Votes
CPN (Unified Marxist–Leninist)	Rajan Rai	18,933
Nepali Congress	Subas Kumar Pokharel	13,411
Federal Socialist Forum, Nepal	Nabin Rai	1,414
Others		1,015
Invalid votes		1,781
Result	CPN (UML) gain	
Source: Election Commission

== See also ==
- CPN (Unified Socialist)
