= Tuluram Rajbanshi =

Nepalese politician

Personal details
- Party: CPN (UML)

Tuluram Rajbanshi (Nepali: टुलुराम राजबंशी) is a Nepalese politician, belonging to the Communist Party of Nepal (Unified Marxist-Leninist). He contested the 1994 legislative election in the Morang-1 constituency, standing against Nepali Congress candidate Girija Prasad Koirala. Rajbanshi came second with 12987 votes, against 21013 for Koirala.

Rajbanshi is the vice-chairman of the Morang District Development Council.
