= Ghanashyam Khatiwada =

Nepalese Politician

- घनश्याम खतिवडा
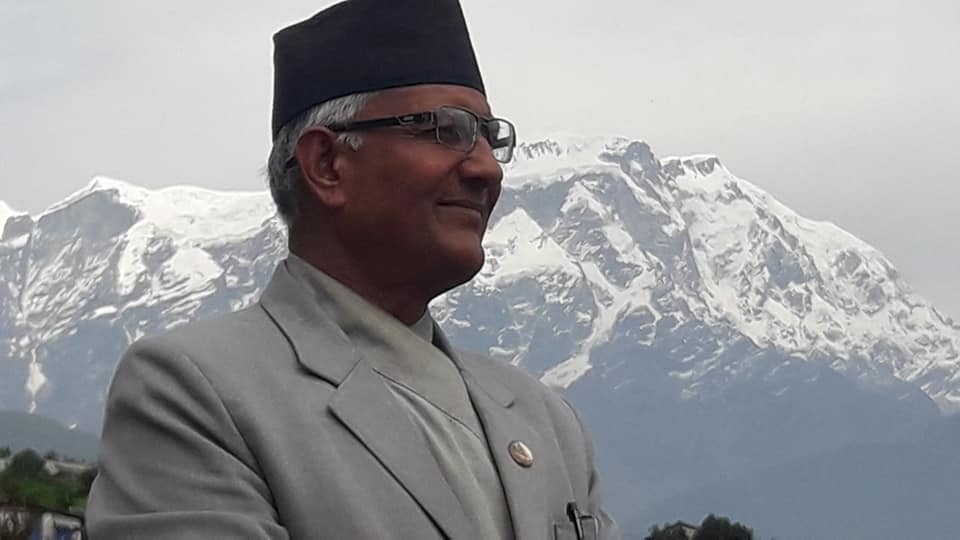

Member of Parliament, Pratinidhi Sabha
- In office 4 March 2018 – 18 September 2022
- Preceded by: Rishikesh Pokharel
- Constituency: Morang 1

Personal details
- Born: 28 October 1961 (age 64)
- Party: CPN (UML)

Ghanashyam Khatiwada is a Nepalese Politician and serving as the Member Of House Of Representatives (Nepal) elected from Morang-1, Province No. 1. He is the member of the Nepal Communist Party and represents the constituency of Morang 1.
