= Bishal Bhattarai =

Nepalese Politician

- विशाल भट्टराई

Chief Whip for CPN (UML) in the House of Representatives
- Incumbent
- Assumed office 8 March 2021

Member of Parliament, Pratinidhi Sabha
- In office 4 March 2018 – 18 September 2022
- Preceded by: Panchakarna Rai
- Constituency: Khotang 1

Member of Constituent Assembly
- In office 21 January 2014 – 14 October 2017
- Preceded by: Samita Karki
- Succeeded by: Constituency abolished
- Constituency: Khotang 2

Personal details
- Born: 4 April 1969 (age 57)
- Party: CPN (UML)

Bishal Bhattarai (born 4 April 1969) in Khotang, Nepal is a Nepalese politician and serving as the Chief Whip of Nepal Communist Party (UML). He is the member of the House of Representatives (Nepal) elected from Khotang. He won the election for the Constituent Assembly in 2065 BS for the first time from Khotang-2.
