= Department of Social Development =

Department of Social Development may refer to:

- Department of Social Development (Canada)
- Department of Social Development (New Brunswick)
- Department of Social Development (South Africa)
- Department for Social Development (Northern Ireland)

== See also ==
- Ministry of Social Development (disambiguation)
