= Phaktang =

Phaktang फाक्टाङ
- Village Development Committee
- Location in Nepal
- Coordinates: 26.90°N 86.82°E
- Country: Nepal
- Zone: Sagarmatha Zone
- District: Khotang District

Population (1991)
  - Total: 1,968
- Time zone: UTC+5:45 (Nepal Time)

Phaktang is a village and Village Development Committee in Khotang District in the Sagarmatha Zone of eastern Nepal. At the time of the 1991 Nepal census it had a population of 1,968 persons living in 327 individual households.
