= Gyanendra Bahadur Karki =

Nepali politician

- ज्ञानेन्द्र बहादुर कार्की
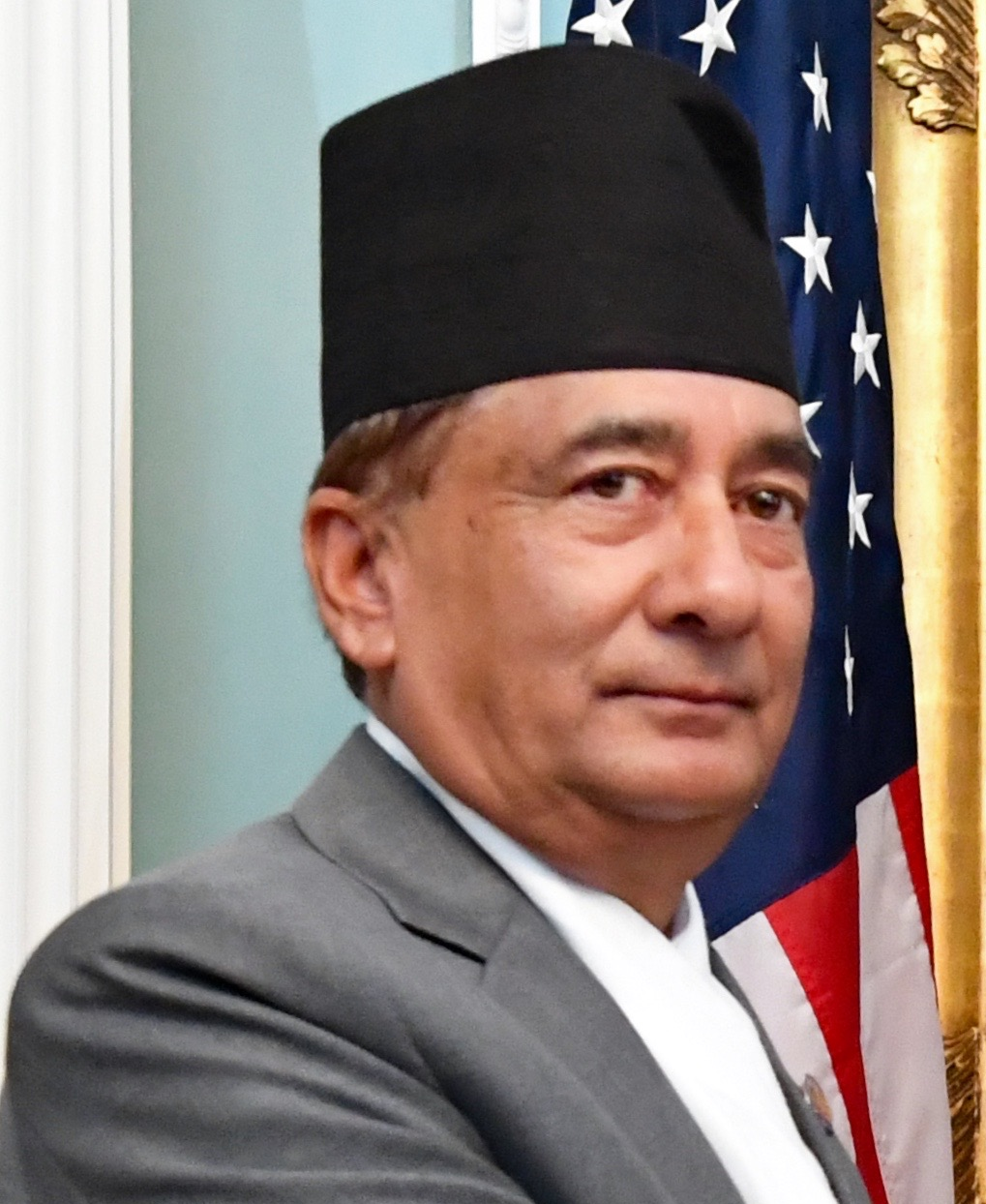
- Karki in Washington, DC in 2017

Minister of Finance of Nepal
- In office 7 June 2017 – 15 February 2018
- President: Bidhya Devi Bhandari
- Prime Minister: Sher Bahadur Deuba
- Preceded by: Krishna Bahadur Mahara
- Succeeded by: Yuba Raj Khatiwada

Minister of Communication and Information Technology of Nepal
- In office 8 October 2021 – 26 December 2022
- President: Bidhya Devi Bhandari
- Prime Minister: Sher Bahadur Deuba
- Preceded by: Lila Nath Shrestha
- Succeeded by: Rekha Sharma

Minister of Law, Justice and Parliamentary Affairs of Nepal
- In office 13 July 2021 – 8 October 2021
- President: Bidhya Devi Bhandari
- Prime Minister: Sher Bahadur Deuba
- Preceded by: Lilanath Shrestha
- Succeeded by: Dilendra Prasad Badu

Member of Parliament, Pratinidhi Sabha
- In office 4 March 2018 – 12 September 2025
- Preceded by: Sitaram Mahato
- Succeeded by: Deepak Kumar Sah
- Constituency: Sunsari 4

Member of Constituent Assembly for Nepali Congress party list
- In office 21 January 2014 – 14 October 2017

Personal details
- Born: 22 February 1957 (age 69)
- Party: Nepali Congress
- Other political affiliations: Nepali Congress (Democratic)
- Spouse: Nabina Rana Karki

Gyanendra Bahadur Karki (Nepali:ज्ञानेन्द्र बहादुर कार्की) is a Nepali politician from Nepali Congress. He is the former Minister for Information and Communications of Nepal. He was Finance Minister under Deuba cabinet, 2017. He has been elected as a House of Representative from constituency 4 of the Sunsari district in 2017 Nepalese legislative election.

== Political life ==
Karki, who was born in Bhojpur in 1957 AD, entered party politics through the Nepal Students Union. Karki, became the president of the Nepal Student's Union in 2039 BS succeeding former Deputy PM and NC Vice-president Bimalendra Nidhi in the post. Karki was a confidant of Krishna Prasad Bhattarai. Karki has led various ministries in different governments which includes; Ministry of Water Resources, Ministry of Finance, Ministry of Law, Justice and Parliamentary Affairs.

== Electoral history ==
Gyanendra Bahadur Karki won the 2017 Nepalese General Election from Sunsari-4. Previously, he lost thrice from Bhojpur-1 and that too with few hundred votes which can be seen below. In 2013 Constituent Assembly election, Karki didn't contest the election and was made MP from Proportional list of Nepali Congress.

=== Election in the 2010s ===
==== 2017 legislative elections ====
Sunsari-4
Party	Candidate	Votes
Nepali Congress	Gyanendra Bahadur Karki	32,347
CPN (Unified Marxist–Leninist)	Ramesh Shrestha	25,750
Rastriya Janata Party Nepal	Ram Narayan Yadav	5,020
Nepali Janata Dal	Sitaram Podar	1,089
CPN (Marxist–Leninist)	Santosh Kumar Dahal	1,037
Others		3,073
Invalid votes		7,062
Result	Congress hold	
Source: Election Commission

=== Election in the 2000s ===
==== 2008 Constituent Assembly election ====
Bhojpur-1
Party	Candidate	Votes
CPN (Maoist)	Padam Bahadur Rai	15,796
Nepali Congress	Gyanendra Bahadur Karki	13,582
CPN (Unified Marxist–Leninist)	Jayant Rai	7,515
Others		2,241
Invalid votes		2,537
Result	Maoist gain	
Source: Election Commission

=== Election in the 1990s ===
==== 1999 legislative elections ====
Bhojpur-1
Party	Candidate	Votes
CPN (Unified Marxist–Leninist)	Ghanendra Basnet	15,443
Nepali Congress	Gyanendra Bahadur Karki	14,605
Independent	Mukund Bahadur Basnet	5,586
CPN (Marxist–Leninist)	Narendra Basnet	4,048
Janamukti Party Nepal	Jagan Bahadur Rai	1,615
Others		1,133
Invalid Votes		1,058
Result	CPN (UML) hold	
Source: Election Commission

==== 1994 legislative elections ====
Bhojpur-1
Party	Candidate	Votes
CPN (Unified Marxist–Leninist)	Hem Raj Rai	15,974
Nepali Congress	Gyanendra Bahadur Karki	15,948
Rastriya Prajatantra Party	Babu Ram Basnet	3,496
Others		1,654
Result	CPN (UML) hold	
Source: Election Commission
