= Kripasur Sherpa =

Nepali politician

- कृपासुर शेर्पा

Minister of Culture, Tourism and Civil Aviation
- In office 23 May 2015 – 12 October 2015
- President: Ram Baran Yadav
- Prime Minister: KP Sharma Oli
- Preceded by: Deepak Chandra Amatya
- Succeeded by: Ananda Pokharel

Member of Parliament, Pratinidhi Sabha
- In office 2013–2017
- Preceded by: Padam Bahadur Rai
- Succeeded by: Sudan Kirati
- Constituency: Bhojpur-2

Personal details
- Party: Communist Party of Nepal (Unified Marxist-Leninist)

Kripasur Sherpa (Nepali: कृपासुर शेर्पा) is a member of the 2nd Nepalese Constituent Assembly. He won the Bhojpur–1 seat in the 2013 Nepalese Constituent Assembly election for the Communist Party of Nepal (Unified Marxist-Leninist).
