= Kamal Prasad Jabegu =

Nepalese politician

Honourable Kamal Prasad Jabegu
- कमल प्रसाद जबेगु

Minister for Physical Infrastructure Development of Koshi Province
- In office 3 November 2023 – 9 May 2024
- Governor: Parshuram Khapung
- Chief Minister: Kedar Karki
- Preceded by: Ek Raj Karki
- Succeeded by: Ganesh Prasad Upreti
- In office 2 August 2023 – 8 September 2023
- Governor: Parshuram Khapung
- Chief Minister: Uddhav Thapa
- Preceded by: Uddhav Thapa as chief minister
- Succeeded by: Ek Raj Karki

Member of the Koshi Provincial Assembly
- Incumbent
- Assumed office 26 December 2022
- Preceded by: Ganesh Kumar Kambang
- Constituency: Panchthar 1(A)

Personal details
- Born: 16 November 1959 (age 66) Panchthar District, Nepal
- Party: CPN(Unified Socialist)

Kamal Prasad Jabegu (Nepali: कमल प्रसाद जबेगु) is a Nepalese politician belonging to CPN (Unified Socialist). He serves as a member of Provincial Assembly from Panchthar 1(A). Jabegu had previously served as the Minister for Physical Infrastructure Development in the Government of Koshi Province on three occasions from, 2 August 2023 to 8 September 2023, 3 November 2023 to 9 May 2024.

== See also ==
- CPN (Unified Socialist)
