= Office of the Chief Minister and Council of Ministers (Koshi Province) =

- मुख्यमन्त्री तथा मन्त्रिपरिषद्को कार्यालय

Agency overview
- Formed: February 2018; 8 years ago
- Jurisdiction: Government of Koshi Province
- Headquarters: Biratnagar, Morang District
- Minister responsible: Hikmat Kumar Karki, Chief Minister
- Deputy Minister responsible: Sirjana Danuwar, Minister of State
- Agency executive: Kedarnath Sharma, Secretary
- Website: ocmcm.koshi.gov.np

The Office of the Chief Minister and Council of Ministers is a political and bureaucratic office that assists the Council of Ministers of Koshi Province and the Chief Minister of Koshi Province in the leadership of the Council of Ministers and Government. The incumbent Chief Minister is Hikmat Kumar Karki and the current council of ministers is the Third Hikmat Karki cabinet.

== Overview ==
According to the constitution of Nepal, the provinces have been established in the Federal Democratic Republic of Nepal, as provided for in the three-tier government structure. Koshi province is one of the seven provinces in Nepal. There are 14 districts: Bhojpur, Dhankuta, Ilam, Jhapa, Khotang, Morang, Okhaldhunga, Panchthar, Sankhuwasabha, Solukhumbu, Sunsari, Taplejung, Terhathum and Udayapur. There is one metropolitan city and tw sub-metropolitan cities. There are a total of 49 local levels consisting of municipalities and 88 rural municipalities.

After Nepal was transformed into a federal structure and the system of union, state and local government was completed in the year 2017, the three-level elections were completed and the provincial government was formed. The Office of the Chief Minister and Council of Ministers was established in February 2018 with the responsibility for making the service delivery of ministries and offices in the province effective and citizen-friendly, managing and operating the employees working in the province and enhancing good governance.

== Mandate ==
The Office's mandate includes the formation, dissolution and alteration of organizational structure of the ministries, the formulation, approval or issue of Bills, Ordinances, and Rules, observation, control, inspection, supervision, coordination, monitoring and evaluation of various ministries and Order and the Protection and Promotion of Human Rights.

== Organizational structure ==
The Office of the Chief Minister and Council of Ministers also oversees several departments, offices and commissions:

- Public Service Commission
- Policy and Planning Commission
- Koshi Province Police
- Office of the Attorney General
- Office of the Governor
