= Khotang 1 =

Parliamentary constituency in Nepal

- Parliamentary constituency
- Khotang 1 in Province No. 1
- Province: Province No. 1
- District: Khotang District

Current constituency
- Created: 1991
- Party: Nepal Communist Party
- Member of Parliament: Bishal Bhattarai
- Member of the Provincial Assembly: Rajan Rai, CPN (US)
- Member of the Provincial Assembly: Ram Kumar Rai, CPN (UML)

Khotang 1 is the parliamentary constituency of Khotang District in Nepal. This constituency came into existence on the Constituency Delimitation Commission (CDC) report submitted on 31 August 2017.

== Incorporated areas ==
Khotang 1 incorporates the entirety of Khotang District.

== Assembly segments ==
It encompasses the following Province No. 1 Provincial Assembly segment

- Khotang 1(A)
- Khotang 1(B)

== Members of Parliament ==
=== Parliament/Constituent Assembly ===
Election	Member	Party
1991	Tanka Rai	CPN (Unified Marxist–Leninist)
1999	Sarbadhan Rai	Nepali Congress
2008	Ram Kumar Rai	CPN (Maoist)
January 2009	Ram Kumar Rai	UCPN (Maoist)
2013	Panchkarna Rai	CPN (Unified Marxist–Leninist)
2017	Bishal Bhattarai	CPN (Unified Marxist–Leninist)
May 2018	Bishal Bhattarai	Nepal Communist Party
2022	Ram Kumar Rai	CPN (Maoist Centre)

=== Provincial Assembly ===
==== 1(A) ====
Election	Member	Party
2017	Rajan Rai	CPN (Unified Marxist-Leninist)
May 2018	Rajan Rai	Nepal Communist Party
March 2021	Rajan Rai	CPN (Unified Marxist–Leninist)
August 2021	Rajan Rai	CPN (Unified Socialist)

==== 1(B) ====
Election	Member	Party
2017	Ram Kumar Rai	CPN (Maoist Centre)
May 2018	Ram Kumar Rai	Nepal Communist Party

== Election results ==
=== Election in the 2020s ===
==== 2026 general election ====
Candidate	Party	Votes	%
Aaren Rai	Shram Sanskriti Party	16,612	28.33
Dev Bikram Rai	CPN (UML)	12,714	21.68
Bir Kaji Rai	Nepali Congress	11,957	20.39
Hari Roka	Nepali Communist Party	9,443	16.10
Rudra Giri	Rastriya Swatantra Party	5,704	9.73
Others		2,208	3.77
Total		58,638	100.00
Registered voters/turnout		146,712	–
Majority		3,898	
Shram Sanskriti gain			

==== 2022 general election ====
Candidate	Party	Votes	%
Ram Kumar Rai	CPN (Maoist Centre)	31,351	48.67
Bishal Bhattarai	CPN (UML)	28,682	44.52
Krishna Kumar Rai	People's Socialist Party, Nepal	1,914	2.97
Sarju Shrestha	Rastriya Prajatantra Party	1,761	2.73
Others		714	1.11
Total		64,422	100.00
Majority		2,669	
CPN (Maoist Centre) gain			

=== Election in the 2010s ===
==== 2017 legislative elections ====
Party	Candidate	Votes
CPN (Unified Marxist–Leninist)	Bishal Bhattarai	37,837
Nepali Congress	Saraswati Bajimaya	23,465
Naya Shakti Party, Nepal	Madan Kumar Rai	2,494
Federal Socialist Forum, Nepal	Krishna Kumar Rai	2,377
Others		732
Invalid votes		4,355
Result	CPN (UML) hold	
Source: Election Commission

==== 2017 Nepalese provincial elections ====
===== 1(A) =====
Party	Candidate	Votes
CPN (Unified Marxist–Leninist)	Rajan Rai	18,933
Nepali Congress	Subas Kumar Pokharel	13,411
Federal Socialist Forum, Nepal	Nabin Rai	1514
Others		1,015
Invalid votes		1,781
Result	CPN (UML) gain	
Source: Election Commission

===== 1(B) =====
Party	Candidate	Votes
Communist Party of Nepal (Maoist Centre)	Ram Kumar Rai	18,372
Nepali Congress	Bishnu Kumar Rai	12,239
Federal Socialist Forum, Nepal	Arjun Thapa	1,233
CPN (Marxist–Leninist)	Kul Prasad Sharma Phuyal	1,038
Invalid votes		1,816
Result	Maoist Centre gain	
Source: Election Commission

==== 2013 Constituent Assembly election ====
Party	Candidate	Votes
CPN (Unified Marxist–Leninist)	Panchkarna Rai	10,824
Nepali Congress	Naresh Kumar Shrestha	9,841
UCPN (Maoist)	Durga Jayanta Rai	7,501
Federal Socialist Party, Nepal	Devraj Rai	2,263
CPN (Marxist–Leninist)	Baindra K.C.	1,002
Others		1,877
Result	CPN (UML) gain	
Source: NepalNews

=== Election in the 2000s ===
==== 2008 Constituent Assembly election ====
Party	Candidate	Votes
CPN (Maoist)	Ram Kumar Rai	16,687
Nepali Congress	Subas Kumar Pokharel	9,029
CPN (Unified Marxist–Leninist)	Panchkarna Rai	8,793
CPN (Unified)	Tanka Rai	2,592
CPN (Marxist–Leninist)	Dharma Sher Rai	2,499
Janamorcha Nepal	Amar Kumar Rai	1,373
Others		989
Invalid votes		2,654
Result	Maoist gain	
Source: Election Commission

=== Election in the 1990s ===
==== 1999 legislative elections ====
Party	Candidate	Votes
Nepali Congress	Sarba Dhan Rai	17,216
CPN (Unified Marxist–Leninist)	Karna Bahadur Ghale	12,814
CPN (Marxist–Leninist)	Ganesh Rai	6,143
Rastriya Prajatantra Party (Chand)	Parshu Ram Rai	4,550
Rastriya Prajatantra Party	Sita Ram Rai	1,620
Others		1,151
Invalid Votes		952
Result	Congress gain	
Source: Election Commission

==== 1994 legislative elections ====
Party	Candidate	Votes
CPN (Unified Marxist–Leninist)	Tanka Rai	14,737
Nepali Congress	Bal Bahadur Rai	14,260
Rastriya Prajatantra Party	Parshuram Rai	7,503
Samyukta Janamorcha Nepal	Nanda Prasad Rai	1,384
Rastriya Janamukti Party	Gajraj Rai	1,112
Independent	Khem Raj Khanal	154
Result	CPN (UML) hold	
Source: Election Commission

==== 1991 legislative elections ====
Party	Candidate	Votes
CPN (Unified Marxist–Leninist)	Tanka Rai	11,563
Nepali Congress	Bal Bahadur Rai	8,039
Result	CPN (UML) gain	

== See also ==
- List of parliamentary constituencies of Nepal
