= Ministry of Internal Affairs And Law (Koshi Province) =

Ministry of Internal Affairs and Law
- आन्तरिक मामिला तथा कानून मन्त्रालय

Agency overview
- Formed: February 2018; 8 years ago
- Jurisdiction: Government of Koshi Province
- Headquarters: Biratnagar, Morang District
- Minister responsible: Lila Ballabh Adhikari, Cabinet Minister
- Agency executive: Kamal Bahadur Thapa, Acting Secretary
- Website: Official website

The Ministry of Internal Affairs And Law is the governmental body of Koshi Province responsible for peace and security, provincial investigation bureau, disaster management, provincial assembly affairs, communication and formulation of provincial level laws.

== Overview ==
According to the constitution of Nepal, the provinces have been established in the Federal Democratic Republic of Nepal, as provided for in the three-tier government structure. Koshi province is one of the seven provinces in Nepal. There are 14 districts Bhojpur, Dhankuta, Ilam, Jhapa, Khotang, Morang, Okhaldhunga, Panchthar, Sankhuwasabha, Solukhumbu, Sunsari, Taplejung, Terhathum and Udayapur, and 1 metropolitan cities, 2 sub-metropolitan city, There are a total of 49 local levels consisting of municipalities and 88 rural municipalities.

After Nepal was transformed into a federal structure and the system of union, state and local government was completed in the year 2017, the three-level elections were completed and the provincial government was formed 15 February 2018. The Ministry of Internal Affairs and Law is one of the seven ministries established and operating in this Koshi Province. The main work of the Ministry is to maintain peace, security and order in the entire province, to protect and promote the fundamental right of freedom of expression of the people and to receive information guaranteed by the Constitution of Nepal and to provide transparency and information for good governance. It is to provide real justice by assisting in the establishment of a legal state.

== Objective ==
The objectives are:

- To protect life, wealth and freedom of the people by maintaining law and order and security.
- To protect and promote democratic values and beliefs including civil liberties, rule of law, human rights guaranteed by the Constitution of Nepal.
- To operate an information management friendly governance system for transparency and good governance.
- Protecting democracy and establishing a legal state by creating the necessary laws for the province government.

== List of former ministers ==
This is a list of all former Ministers since 2018–Present.

Hikmat Kumar Karki (as Minister)	15 February 2018	26 August 2021
Kedar Karki (as Minister)	2 November 2021	9 January 2023
Uddhav Thapa (as Chief Minister)	7 July 2023	2 August 2023
Lila Ballabh Adhikari (as Minister)	25 September 2023	15 October 2023
Shamsher Rai (as Minister)	15 October 2023	9 May 2024
