= Muga Lal Mahato =

Nepali politician

Personal details
- Party: Madhesi Janadhikar Forum

Muga Lal Mahato (Nepali: मुगालाल महतो) is a Nepalese politician, belonging to the Madhesi Janadhikar Forum. In April 2008, he won the Sunsari-4 seat in the Constituent Assembly election with 19,945 votes.
