= Governor of Koshi Province =

Nominal head of an Koshi

- कोशी प्रदेश प्रमुख
- Incumbent; Parshuram Khapung since 20 August 2021
- Governor's Office; Government of Koshi Province
- Style: His Excellency
- Status: Head of state
- Reports to: President of Nepal
- Residence: Bhaisepati
- Appointer: President of Nepal
- Term length: 5 years
- Inaugural holder: Govinda Subba
- Formation: 2018 (8 years ago)
- Salary: 76,240 Nepalese rupees (NPR)

The governor of Koshi Province is the nominal head of state of the Koshi Province of Nepal and a representative of the President of Nepal. The governor is appointed by the President for a term of five years. The governor's powers are mostly ceremonial and the executive powers of the governor are exercised by the chief minister of Koshi Province, who is the head of the executive of the state government of Koshi Province.

The incumbent, Parshuram Khapung, is serving as the governor of Koshi Province since 11 November 2021.

== List of governors ==
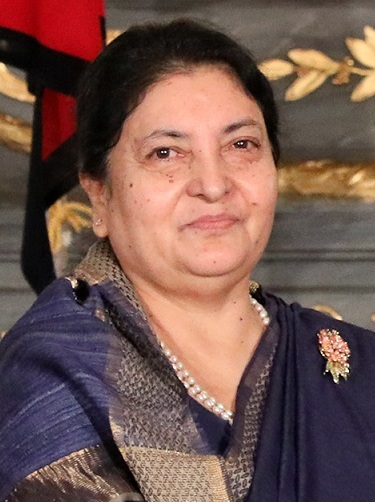
No.	Portrait	Title Governor Office (Birth–Death)	Term of office		Appointed by President
1		Govinda Subba (b. 1958)	19 January 2018	3 November 2019	Bidya Devi Bhandari
1		Govinda Subba (b. 1958)	1 year, 288 days		Bidya Devi Bhandari
2		Somnath Adhikari	4 November 2019	9 November 2021	Bidya Devi Bhandari
2		Somnath Adhikari	2 years, 5 days		Bidya Devi Bhandari
3		Parshuram Khapung	9 November 2021	10 November 2026	Bidya Devi Bhandari
3		Parshuram Khapung	5 years, 1 day		Bidya Devi Bhandari

== Selection process ==
Article 164 of the Constitution of Nepal states that:

1. being qualified for being a member of the Federal Parliament,
2. having completed the age of thirty five years, and
3. not being disqualified by any law.
