= Somnath Adhikari =

Nepali politician

Somnath Adhikari 'Pyasi'
- सोमनाथ अधिकारी 'प्यासी'

2nd Governor of Province No. 1
- In office 5 November 2019 – 9 November 2021
- President: Bidhya Devi Bhandari
- Prime Minister: KP Oli
- Chief Minister: Sher Dhan Rai; Bhim Acharya; Rajendra Kumar Rai
- Preceded by: Govinda Subba
- Succeeded by: Parshuram Khapung

Member of National Panchayat
- In office 1986 - 1991

Member of Pratinidhi Sabha
- In office 1991 - 1994
- Constituency: Kaski-3

Personal details
- Born: Somnath Adhikari; 6 January 1951 (age 75) Batulechaur, Kaski, Nepal
- Parent(s): Liladhar Adhikari (father); Sabitri Adhikari (mother)
- Education: B.Ed. from Prithivi Narayan Campus
- Occupation: Teacher
- Website: oph.p1.gov.np

Somnath Adhikari (born 6 January 1951) affectionately known as Pyasi (meaning "thirsty" in Nepali), is a Nepalese politician who served as the 2nd Governor of Province No. 1 of Nepal. He is former member of the National Panchayat from 1986 to 1991 and member of Pratinidhi Sabha from 1991 to 1994. He is an active politician of CPN (ML) now CPN (UML) from 1968 and served as the district president of Kaski and later he hold the president post of the party election committee.

== Personal life ==
Pyasi was born in Batulechaur, Kaski district to Liladhar Adhikari and Sabitri Adhikari. He did his secondary education from local government school and later finished his Bachelor degree from Prithivi Narayan Campus, Pokhara.

Political offices
Preceded by Govinda Subba	Governor of Province No. 1; 5 November 2019 – Present
