= Rajendra Kumar Rai (Nepalese politician) =

Nepali politician

Honourable Rajendra Kumar Rai
- राजेन्द्र कुमार राई
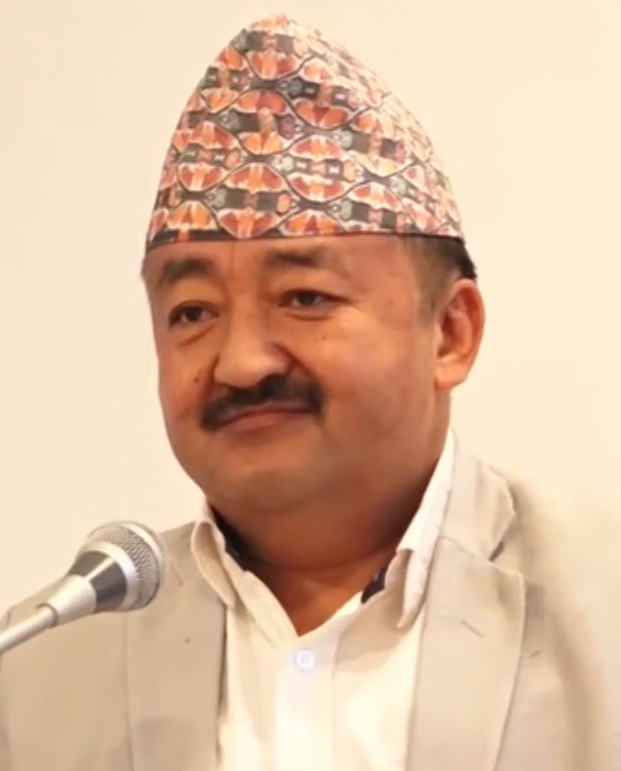

3rd Chief Minister of Province No. 1
- In office 2 November 2021 – 9 January 2023
- President: Bidhya Devi Bhandari
- Governor: Somnath Adhikari; Parshuram Khapung
- Preceded by: Bhim Acharya
- Succeeded by: Hikmat Kumar Karki

Leader of the House in the Koshi Provincial Assembly
- In office 2 November 2021 – 9 January 2023
- Preceded by: Bhim Acharya
- Succeeded by: Hikmat Kumar Karki

Secretary of the CPN (Unified Socialist)
- Incumbent
- Assumed office 23 September 2021
- Preceded by: Position created

Member of the Koshi Provincial Assembly
- Incumbent
- Assumed office 2018
- Constituency: Bhojpur 1(A)

Personal details
- Born: 29 June 1970 (age 55) Kimalung, Bhojpur, Nepal
- Party: CPN (Unified Socialist)
- Spouse: Shobha Pathak
- Education: Masters in Political Science

Rajendra Kumar Rai (Nepali: राजेन्द्र कुमार राई) is a Nepalese politician, belonging to the CPN (Unified Socialist). He has served as the chief minister of Province No. 1.

== Electoral history ==
=== 2017 Nepalese provincial elections, Bhojpur 1(A) ===
| Party | Candidate | Votes |
|---|---|---|
| CPN (Unified Marxist–Leninist) | Rajendra Kumar Rai | 19,297 |
| Federal Socialist Forum, Nepal | Ajambar Rai Kangmang | 11,541 |
| Others | | 1,749 |
| Invalid votes | | 2,351 |
| Result | CPN (UML) gain | |
Source: Election Commission

== See also ==
- CPN (Unified Socialist)

Political offices
| Preceded by Bhim Acharya | Chief Minister of Province No. 1; 2021- | Succeeded by incumbent |
