= Sher Dhan Rai =

Former Chief Minister of Province No. 1

- शेरधन राई

1st Chief Minister of Koshi Province
- In office 14 February 2018 – 26 August 2021
- President: Bidhya Devi Bhandari
- Governor: Govinda Subba; Somnath Adhikari Pyasi
- Preceded by: Province established
- Succeeded by: Bhim Acharya
Other senior positions
Leader of the House in the Koshi Provincial Assembly
In office 15 January 2018 – 26 August 2021
President	Bidhya Devi Bhandari
Preceded by	Province established
Succeeded by	Bhim Acharya
Ministry of Information and Communications (Nepal)
In office 5 November 2015 – 14 August 2016
President	Bidhya Devi Bhandari
Prime Minister	KP Sharma Oli
Preceded by	Minendra Rijal
Succeeded by	Ram Karki
Parliamentary offices
Member of Parliament, Pratinidhi Sabha
In office May 1999 – May 2002
Preceded by	Dhan Harka Rai
Succeeded by	himself (as member of reinstated Hor)
Constituency	Bhojpur 2
Member of Interim legislature
In office 28 April 2006 – 16 January 2008
Preceded by	Himself (as member of Hor)
Succeeded by	Sudan Kirati (as member of CA)
Constituency	Bhojpur 2
Member of Legislature Parliament
In office 21 January 2014 – 14 October 2017
Preceded by	Sudan Kirati
Succeeded by	Constituency disestablished
Constituency	Bhojpur 2
Member of Province No. 1 Provincial Assembly
In office 5 February 2018 – 2 September 2022
Preceded by	Constituency established
Succeeded by	Binod Rai
- Constituency: Bhojpur 1(B)

Personal details
- Born: February 23, 1971 (age 55) Bhojpur, Nepal
- Party: Communist Party of Nepal (Unified Marxist–Leninist) (before 2018; since 2021)
- Other political affiliations: Nepal Communist Party (2018 - 2021)
- Spouse: Jangmu Enn Sherpa (m. 2021)
- Education: Master's in Sociology

Sher Dhan Rai (Nepali: शेरधन राई; born 25 June 1970) is a Nepalese politician and former Chief Minister of Koshi Province, a province in eastern part of Nepal. He was elected parliamentary party leader of CPN (UML), the largest party in the provincial assembly, on 9 February 2018. Rai was subsequently appointed chief minister on 14 February 2018. He was previously elected to the 2nd Nepalese Constituent Assembly, winning the Bhojpur–2 seat for the Communist Party of Nepal (Unified Marxist–Leninist). Rai also served as a cabinet minister in the Government of Nepal, and was appointed Minister of Information and Communications in the first Oli cabinet.

== Personal life ==
Rai was born in Pasalbhanjyang, Thidingkha, Bhojpur in eastern Nepal in an agrarian family to Jagir Man Rai and Ramri Maya Rai. His father was elected thrice as village chief during the Panchayat period, and for two more terms after the Panchayat system was replaced by multi-party democracy. Rai has a post-graduate degree in Sociology. He married Jangmu Sherpa on 24 January 2021.
