= Government of Koshi Province =

Nepalese Provincial Government

- Kōśī Pradēśa Sarkāra
- Emblem of the Government of Koshi Province as of May 2026

Overview
- Established: 15 September 2015; 10 years ago (as Province No. 1 until March 1, 2023)
- State: Federal Democratic Republic of Nepal
- Leader: Chief Minister (Hikmat Kumar Karki)
- Appointed by: Governor (Parshuram Khapung)
- Main organ: Council of Ministers
- Ministries: 9 ministries
- Responsible to: Koshi Provincial Assembly
- Annual budget: रू 35.87 billion
- Headquarters: Provincial Secretariat, Morang

The Government of Koshi Province (ISO: Kōśī Pradēśa Sarkāra) is the provincial government of the Nepalese province of Koshi with the governor being appointed constitutional head of the province. The Governor of Koshi Province is appointed for a period of five years and appoints the Chief Minister of Koshi Province and their council of ministers, who are vested with the executive powers of the province. The governor remains a ceremonial head of the state, while the chief minister and their council are responsible for day-to-day government functions.

The Governor of the province is appointed head of the province by the President of Nepal on the recommendation of Federal cabinet for a period of five years unless freed earlier by federal government. The Head of Koshi Province is the Governor (Provincial Chief), and the Chief Minister holds the position of the Head of executive. The role of governor is largely ceremonial as the functioning of the government is managed entirely by the Chief Minister. The governor appoints minister and chief minister based on the articles and clauses of Constitution.

The Koshi government maintains its capital at Biratnagar and is seated at the Koshi Provincial Government Secretariat.

== Etymology ==
The province is named Koshi after the Kosi River, which is the largest in the country. On 1 March 2023 the temporary name of the province Province No. 1 changes into Koshi Province. The Kosi river is significantly and culturally an important river of Nepal. The Kosi River is called Kausika in Rigveda and Kausiki in Mahabharata. The Kosi is associated with many ancient spiritual stories. It is mentioned in the Bal Kand section of Valmiki Ramayana as the Kausiki who is the form assumed by Satyavati after her death. In Ramayana Kausiki is mentioned as younger sister of Ganga.

== Executive ==
=== Head of State ===
The Governors of the Provinces of Nepal have similar powers and functions at the province (state) level as those of the President of Nepal at National level. According to the Constitution of Nepal, the Governor is a state's head, but de facto executive authority rests with the Chief Minister. The governor acts as the nominal head whereas the real power lies with the Chief ministers of the province and his/her councils of ministers. The Governor of a Province is appointed by the President of Nepal. The incumbent Governor of Koshi Province is Parshuram Khapung, since 20 August 2021.

=== Head of Government ===
Chief Minister

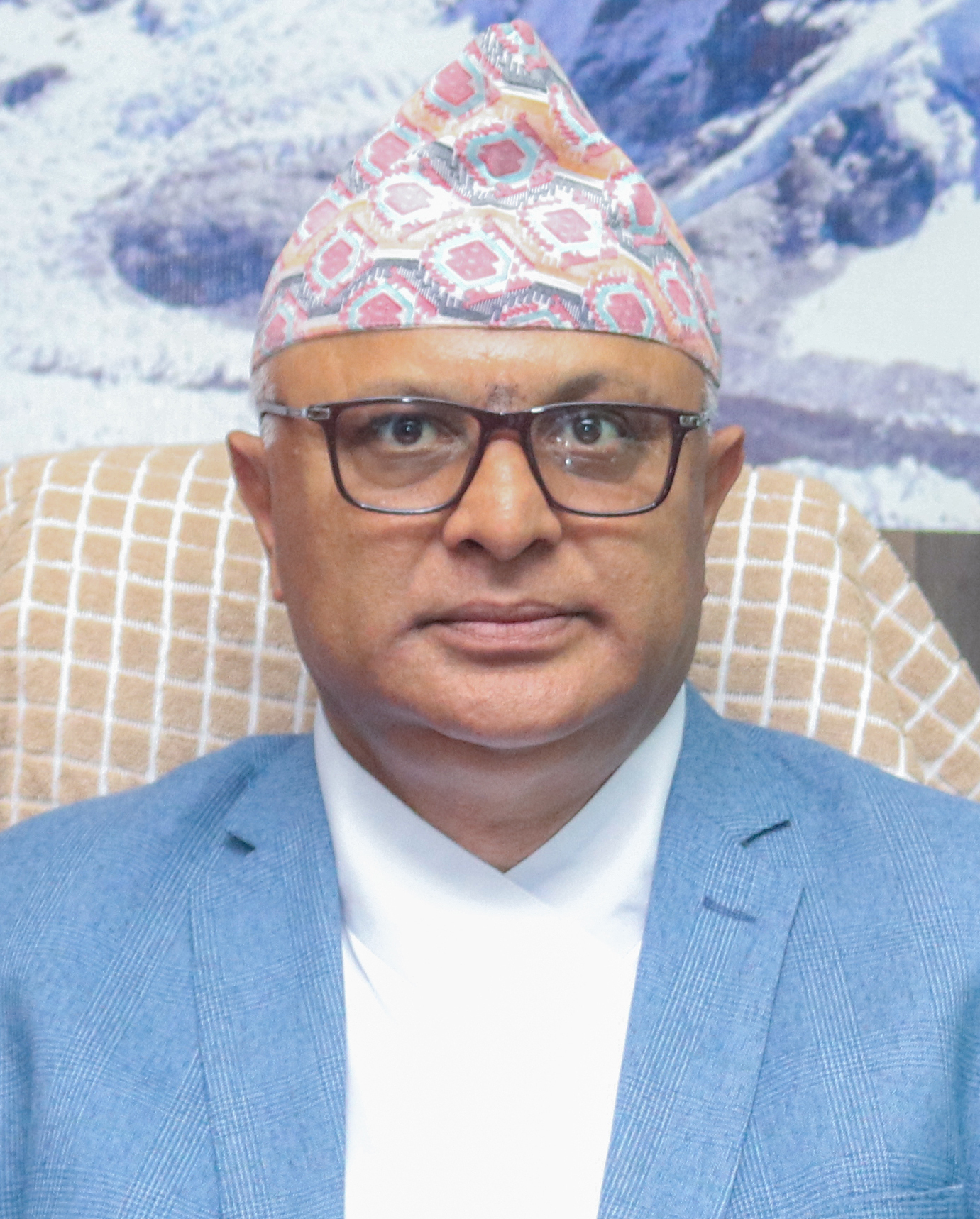
Hikmat Kumar Karki

In the Federal Democratic Republic of Nepal, a chief minister is the elected head of government of each province. Following elections to the Koshi Provincial Assembly, the governor usually invites the party (or coalition) with a majority of seats to form the government. The governor appoints the chief minister, whose council of ministers are collectively responsible to the assembly. Given that he has the confidence of the assembly, the chief minister's term is for five years and is subject to no term limits.The current Chief Minister of Koshi Province is Hikmat Kumar Karki, since 9 May 2024.

=== Secretary ===
The Chief Secretary of Koshi Province (Nepali: कोशी प्रदेशको मुख्य सचिव) is the chief administrative officer and senior–most civil servant of the Government of Koshi Province. The chief secretary is the head of the Cabinet Secretariat and is the secretary of the cabinet and the constitutional council. The Cabinet Secretary enforces cabinet discipline and coordinates between ministries.The current acting Chief secretary of Nepal is (Deepak Kafle)

== Legislature ==
=== Officers ===
Speaker	Deputy Speaker
Ambar Bahadur Bista	Sirjana Danuwar

=== Koshi Provincial Assembly ===
The Koshi Provincial Assembly also known as the Koshi Pradesh Sabha. The legislative structure of the province is unicameral. The Koshi Province Provincial Assembly consists of 93 members of whom 54 are elected through first-past-the-post voting and 37 of whom are elected through proportional representation. The term of the assembly is five years unless dissolved earlier.

== Judiciary ==
=== High court ===
Biratnagar High Court (Nepali: बिराटनगर उच्च अदालत) is the high court of Koshi Province. The high court established according to the new constitution of Nepal. Article 139 of the constitution says “there shall be a High Court in each state”. According to article 300 (3): “The High Courts set forth in Article 139 shall be established no later than one year after the date of commencement of this Constitution. The Appellate Courts existing at the time of commencement of this Constitution shall be dissolved after the establishment of such courts”. The government of Nepal transformed the existing appellate court in Biratnagar on 14 September 2016. As per the government decision, there will be extended benches in Illam, Dhankuta and Okhaldhunga under the high court in Biratnagar.

Ramesh Prasad Rajbhandari is the current chief judge of Biratnagar High Court.

== See also ==
- Administration in Koshi Province
