= Phaktanglung Rural Municipality =

Phaktanglung
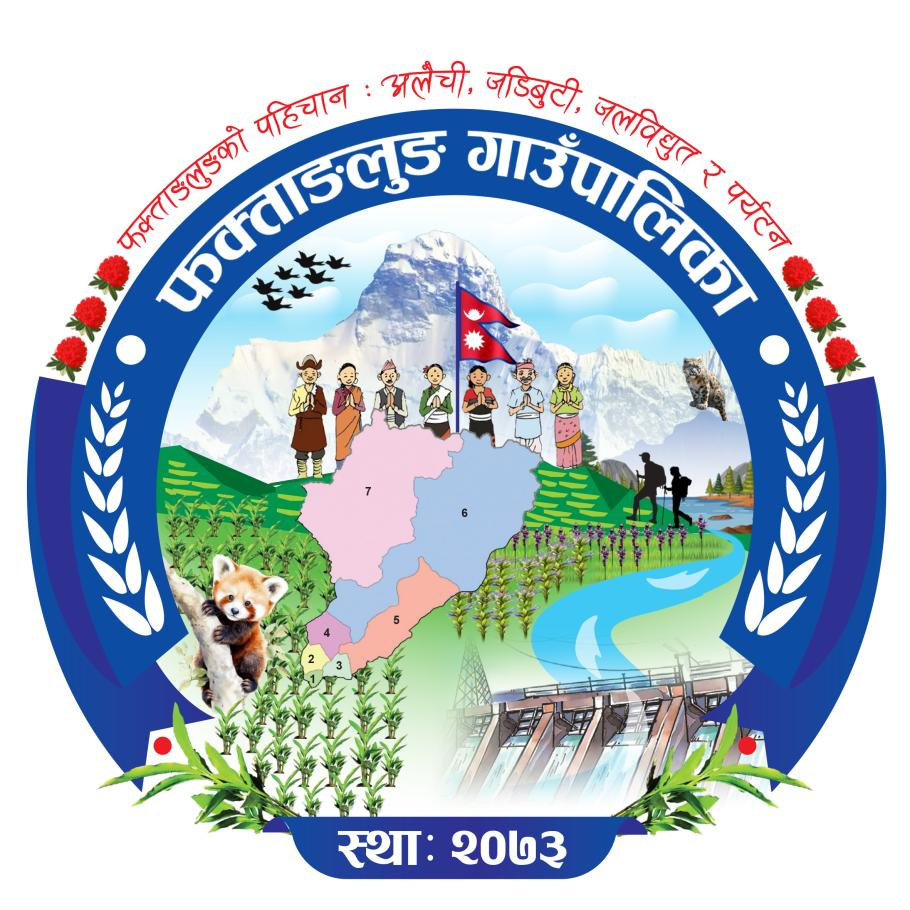
- Phaktanglung RM logo

- Location in Province Phaktanglung (Nepal)
- Coordinates: 27°26′59.99″N 87°44′24.12″E
- Country: Nepal
- Province: Koshi Province
- District: Taplejung
- No. of wards: 7
- Established: 10 March 2017

Government
  - Type: Rural council
  - Chairperson: Mr.Rajan Limbu "Mukti" (CPN (Maoist Centre)
  - Vice-chairperson: Mr.Rabin Samra Limbu"Bikas" (NC)

Area
  - Total: 1,858.51 km^{2} (717.57 sq mi)
  - Rank: 3rd largest (Nepal); 1st largest (Province No. 1)

Population (2021)
  - Total: 11,791
  - Density: 6.3443/km^{2} (16.432/sq mi)
- Time zone: UTC+5:45 (NST)
- Website: Official Website

Phaktanglung is a Rural municipality (Gaunpalika) located in Taplejung District in Koshi Province of eastern Nepal. The local body was formed by merging seven previous VDCs namely Sawadin, Khejenim, Linkhim, Ikhabu, Tapethok, Lelep, Olangchungkhola. Currently, it has a total of 7 wards. The population of the municipality is 11,791 according to the 2021 Nepal census and total area of the rural council is 1,858.51 square kilometres (717.57 sq mi) which is the 3rd largest rural council of Nepal. It is the 1st largest rural council of Koshi Province.

== Geography ==
Majority of rural municipality is a part of protected area which is called Kanchenjunga Conservation Area comprises cultivated lands, forests, pastures, rivers, high altitude lakes and glaciers.

== Constituencies ==
Phaktanglung RM falls under Taplejung 1 (parliamentary constituency) and Taplejung 1(B) (provincial) constituency.

== Demography ==
The population of Phaktanglung, as of the 2021 Nepal census, is 11,791. The largest ethnic group is Limbu, with 67.1% of the population, and the most common religion is Kirat, with 65.8% of the population.

84.2% of the population work in agriculture.

Ward divisions of Phaktanglung
#	Ward Name	Ward No.	Population (2011)	Area (KM²)
1	Sawadin	1	1,461	11.07
2	Khejenim	2	2,406	29.75
3	Linkhim	3	2,214	26.33
4	Ikhabu	4	2,032	61.46
5	Tapethok	5	1,460	219.87
6	Lelep	6	2,205	808.53
7	Olangchungola	7	239	701.50

== See also ==
- Taplejung District
