= Kshitij Thebe =

Nepalese politician

- क्षितिज थेबे

Member of Parliament, Pratinidhi Sabha
- Incumbent
- Assumed office 26 March 2026
- Preceded by: Yogesh Bhattarai
- Constituency: Taplejung 1

Personal details
- Born: 13 December 1987 (age 38) Sinam, Taplejung, Nepal
- Party: CPN (UML)
- Parents: Bhupendra Thebe (father); Urmila Thebe (mother)

Kshitij Thebe is a Nepalese politician currently serving as a member of Parliament (MP) for Taplejung 1 from the CPN (UML).

== Early life ==
Thebe was born in Sinam, Taplejung to Bhupendra Thebe and Urmila Thebe. His parents were involved in politics with the CPN (UML). His father was a member of the 2nd Nepalese Constituent Assembly and his mother served as MP at the 6th House of Representatives.

== Political career ==
Thebe was a member of the All Nepal National Free Students Union. He was made co-chair of the revived youth wing of CPN (UML), National Youth Federation Nepal in July 2021. He was re-elected as chair in May 2025.

Thebe was elected to the Pratinidhi Sabha for Taplejung 1 at the 2026 general election.
