= Olangchung Gola =

Olangchung Gola ओलाङ्चुङ गोला Walungchung Gola
- Village
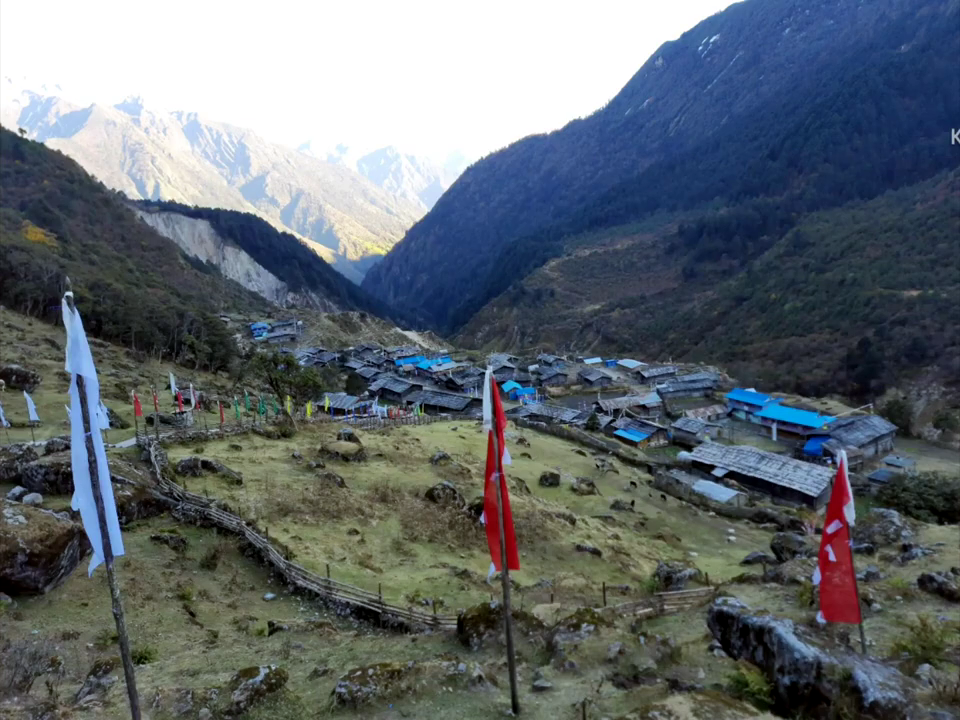

- Location in Nepal
- Coordinates: 27.6792°N 87.7792°E
- Country: Nepal
- Province: Koshi Province
- District: Taplejung District
- Rural municipality: Phaktanglung
- Ward No.: 7 (७)

Government
  - Type: Ward
  - Commissioner: Chheten Sherpa

Area
  - Total: 701.50 km^{2} (270.85 sq mi)

Population (2011)
  - Total: 239
  - Density: 0.341/km^{2} (0.882/sq mi)
- Time zone: UTC+5:45 (Nepal Time)
- Postal code: 57508
- Area code: 024

Olangchung Gola (locally as Walung or Holung, Tibetan: ཝ་ལུང་, Wylie: wa lung, historically transcribed as Wallanchoon) is a village (previously: a village development committee) in ward no. 7 of Phaktanglung rural municipality of Taplejung District of Koshi Province in Nepal. Olangchung is surrounded by Lelep village to the east and Tibet to the north, Sankhuwasabha District to west and Mikkwakhola rural municipality to south. It is located to the north of Tamor River in the mountainous area in the northwest of Taplejung District bordering Tibet, China. Lately the river flowing next to the village is gradually expanding towards the village posing a serious threat of submerging the village.

Olangchung Gola is the last village before crossing the Lumbasumba La pass to the west to the remote village of Thudam along the high Great Himalayan Trail system. There is one lodge for trekkers with camping space in Olangchung Gola.

== Etymology ==
Gola means "market" in the local language. In fact, the name "Olangchung" came from a folklore involving a wolf and a trader.

== History ==
The area was once a strategic place between Tibet, Nepal and Sikkim. Historically Tipta La (27°48′57″N 87°44′07″E), also called the Walung Chung Pass, was an important trade route to Tibet. In addition, Olangchung Gola was the trade hub for surrounding villages such as Yangma, Ghunsa, Khangbachey, Lungthung, Lelep.

In 1775, a treaty with Sikkim was negotiated at this location, in the presence of Tibetan representatives. However, Nepalese sources state that Tibet and Nepal were the chief signatories. The border was apparently set at the Kankai River. But soon afterwards, Nepal occupied Ilam, giving rise to Sikkimese grievance.

In 1892, the Sikkimese ruler Thutob Namgyal, peeved by the ill-treatment accorded by British Raj, went into hiding here, ready to escape into Tibet. However, Tibet refused entry, and he was eventually arrested by the Nepalese and returned to British India.

== Transportation ==
In late 2016, China built a road connection on their side to the border at Tiptala Bhanjyang (Tipta La). In June 2017, Chinese construction crew constructed a dirt track from the border to Olangchung Gola, the funding of which रू 30,000,000 was provided by local Nepali consumers' committee. In 2019, the Chinese government allocated addition funding to upgrade the road.

In the other direction, construction of the road connecting Phungling Municipality began in early 2018.

== People ==
The Walung people are the indigenous inhabitants of the region around Olangchung Gola. They are descended from Tibetan traders and practice Nyingmapa Buddhism.

A large monastery, Deki Chholing Gompa, was built 450 years ago sits on top of the village.

At the time of the 1991 Nepal census it had a population of 422 people living in 82 individual households. According to 2011 Nepal census 239 people live in 62 individual households.

== Notable people ==
Dr. Sanduk Ruit a veteran ophthalmologist was born in Olangchung Gola.

== Climate ==
Climate data for Olangchung Gola, elevation 3,119 m (10,233 ft)
Month	Jan	Feb	Mar	Apr	May	Jun	Jul	Aug	Sep	Oct	Nov	Dec	Year
Mean daily maximum °C (°F)	7.4 (45.3)	7.9 (46.2)	11.1 (52.0)	14.6 (58.3)	16.1 (61.0)	17.0 (62.6)	17.3 (63.1)	17.5 (63.5)	16.3 (61.3)	15.1 (59.2)	11.4 (52.5)	9.0 (48.2)	13.4 (56.1)
Mean daily minimum °C (°F)	−3.1 (26.4)	−1.9 (28.6)	1.2 (34.2)	3.2 (37.8)	5.0 (41.0)	8.7 (47.7)	9.8 (49.6)	9.3 (48.7)	8.1 (46.6)	4.3 (39.7)	0.3 (32.5)	−1.9 (28.6)	3.6 (38.5)
Average precipitation mm (inches)	28.4 (1.12)	35.6 (1.40)	58.4 (2.30)	67.2 (2.65)	88.7 (3.49)	260.3 (10.25)	314.8 (12.39)	319.6 (12.58)	216.0 (8.50)	83.3 (3.28)	24.8 (0.98)	18.2 (0.72)	1,515.3 (59.66)
Source: Australian National University

Climate data for Pangthang Doma elevation 2,818 m (9,245 ft)
Month	Jan	Feb	Mar	Apr	May	Jun	Jul	Aug	Sep	Oct	Nov	Dec	Year
Mean daily maximum °C (°F)	9.3 (48.7)	10.2 (50.4)	13.6 (56.5)	17.0 (62.6)	18.3 (64.9)	18.8 (65.8)	19.0 (66.2)	19.1 (66.4)	18.0 (64.4)	17.0 (62.6)	13.1 (55.6)	10.6 (51.1)	15.3 (59.6)
Mean daily minimum °C (°F)	−1.3 (29.7)	−0.2 (31.6)	3.2 (37.8)	4.8 (40.6)	6.8 (44.2)	10.3 (50.5)	11.3 (52.3)	10.9 (51.6)	9.8 (49.6)	6.0 (42.8)	2.1 (35.8)	−0.3 (31.5)	5.3 (41.5)
Average precipitation mm (inches)	16.4 (0.65)	24.4 (0.96)	49.7 (1.96)	59.5 (2.34)	83.3 (3.28)	273.8 (10.78)	334.3 (13.16)	339.6 (13.37)	224.6 (8.84)	77.3 (3.04)	12.4 (0.49)	5.1 (0.20)	1,500.4 (59.07)
Source: Australian National University
