= Tipta La =

Mountain pass between Nepal and China

Tiptala Pass
- Location within Koshi Province Location within Nepal

Highest point
- Elevation: 5,118 m (16,791 ft)
- Listing: Mountain passes of Nepal
- Coordinates: 27°48′56″N 87°44′08″E

Geography
- Location: Olangchungola (Ward no.7), Phaktanglung, Taplejung, Koshi Province, Nepal
- Parent range: Himalayas

Climbing
- Easiest route: snow/ice/glacier climb

Tiptala or Tipta-La is an international mountain pass between Nepal and China located on 5,118 metres (16,791 ft) to 5,200 metres (17,100 ft) of elevation. The pass is located around 20 kilometres (12 mi) North from the town Olangchungola. Riu a Chinese settlement of Dinggyê County of Tibet is located about 35 kilometres (22 mi) far, the other side of the Tiptala pass.
