= Jhuma Limbu =

Nepali musician

- झुमा लिम्बू ᤉᤢᤔᤠ ᤗᤡᤶᤒᤢ
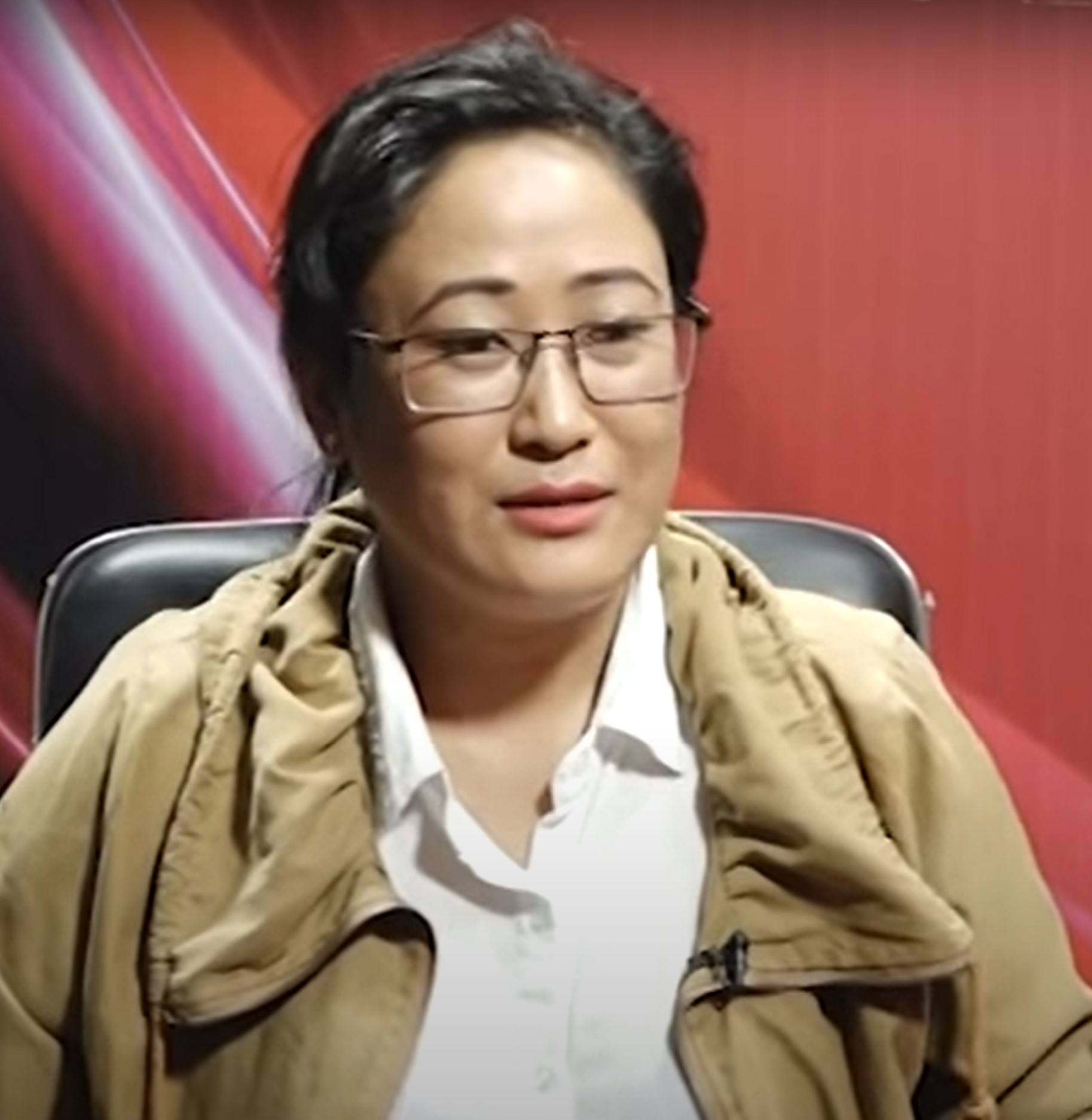
- Limbu being interviewed by Ratopati TV (2017)
- Born: Dhungesaghu, Taplejung, Nepal
- Occupation: Musician
- Notable work: Amber Sangeet; Khaasaam
- Style: Folk music
- Website: Official website

Jhuma Limbu is a Nepalese singer, folk musician. She has been actively researching about various Nepali folk music genres and instruments. She has released multiple albums, including an audio version of Mundhum, the Limbu religious scripture. She trained under Amber Gurung, a famous Nepali musician who composed the Nepali national anthem.

In an interview, Limbu argued that most other ethnic groups in Nepal have their own specific geographic region where they are native to and cited that Limbus and Rai are from the east, Sunuwar, Tamang, Newar, Gurung, and Magar in the middle hills, and Sherpa communities in the higher Himalayas and questioned where a specific region existed for the Bahun and Chhetri people, suggesting instead that they entered the region from the far-western hills of Kumaon and Garhwal.

== Early life and education ==
Limbu was born in Dhungesaghu VDC (now Maiwakhola rural municipality) of Taplejung district in Eastern Nepal as the youngest child among six siblings. She started singing by participating in Dhan Nach, a folk dance and music custom among Limbu community. A song called Palam is sung while performing the dance. After completing her SLC level education in 2001, she moved to Kathmandu. She passed the voice test in Radio Nepal and decided to stay in Kathmandu. She then joined Ratna Rajya Laxmi Campus but left after some time because of the dissatisfaction of how music classes were conducted there. She then joined Lalit Kala Campus, a fine arts college.

== Music career ==
While studying in Lalit Kala, she started taking classes under classical musician Chandan Kumar Shrestha. She released her first album Eh Saila under his mentorship. She then started training under Amber Gurung. Her second album Amber Sangeet was a tribute to her mentor. All songs of the album except one (composed by Ratna Shamsher Thapa) were composed by Gurung. She collaborated with Gurung's son, Kishor Gurung while producing the album.

In 2014, she released an album titled Khaasaam which consists of solo and ensemble performances based on Limbu culture.

She is a part of Raithane Sangeet Abhiyan, a movement for conservation and promotion of Nepali folk music. She has also researched and documented about various singing methods of indigenous communities and folk instruments used throughout Nepal. She was honoured by Yakhung Yuwa Manch, Lalitpur for her contribution in preserving folk music.

She alongside Ganga Thapa composed the music for Jaar, a 2022 Nepali film based on a story by Indra Bahadur Rai. The film is directed by Phurba Tshering Lama and starred Anoop Bikram Shahi, Geetanjali Thapa, Saugat Malla.

== Discography ==
Albums

- Eh Saila
- Amber Sangeet
- Khaasaam (Sounds of Mundhum; 2014)

Singles

- Aaiyaani (with Ashok Mukarung)
- Kati Lagu Tero Pachi (with Dipak Jangam)
- Latthai Pare Ma Dante Mohanima (with Ashok Rasik)
- Saaili Morilai (with Ashok Mukarung)
- Timilai Bhetna Aauda
