= Dhungesaghu =

Dhungesaghu ढुङ्गेसाँघु
- Former Village development committee
- Location in Nepal
- Coordinates: 27.35°N 87.57°E
- Country: Nepal
- Province: Koshi Province
- District: Taplejung District
- Rural Municipality: Maiwakhola Rural Municipality

Population (2011)
  - Total: 3,748
- Time zone: UTC+5:45 (Nepal Time)

Dhungesaghu is a town and a former village development committee in Taplejung District in the Koshi Province (previously Mechi Zone of Eastern Development Region) of north-eastern Nepal. At the time of the 2011 Nepal census it had a population of 3,748 people living in 746 individual households. There were 1,734 males and 2,014 females at the time of census. The VDC was dissolved and merged with Phakumba, Sanghu VDCs to form Maiwakhola Rural Municipality.
