= Dokhu =

Dokhu दोखु
- Location in Nepal
- Coordinates: 27.34°N 87.68°E
- Country: Nepal
- Province: Province No. 1
- District: Taplejung District

Population (2011)
  - Total: 4,111
- Time zone: UTC+5:45 (Nepal Time)

Dokhu is a town center under Taplejung Municipality in the Himalayas of Taplejung District in the Province No. 1 of north-eastern Nepal. This village was merged into municipality in May 2014. At the time of the 2011 Nepal census it had a population of 4,111 people living in 909 individual households. There were 1,940 males and 2,171 females at the time of census.

Dokgu village development committee in the taplejung district is place of corn house of taplejung. pepplesof different ethnic groups live happily here. vegetable and fruits farming is main occupation of here.
