= Linkhim =

Lingkhim लिङ्खिम
- Village development committee
- Location in Nepal
- Coordinates: 27.45°N 87.74°E
- Country: Nepal
- Province: Province No. 1
- District: Taplejung District

Population (2011)
  - Total: 2,214
- Time zone: UTC+5:45 (Nepal Time)

Lingkhim refers to both the surename or sub-caste of Limbu people and their historical place of origin, formerly village development committee in the Himalayas of Taplejung District in the current Phaktanglung Rural Municipality Province No. 1 of north-eastern Nepal. At the time of the 2011 Nepal census it had a population of 2,214 people living in 457 individual households. There were 1,079 males and 1,135 females at the time of census.
