= Bharat Mani Paudel =

Nepali comedian artist

- भरतमणि पौडेल
- Born: Nepal
- Occupation: Comedian Artist
- Years active: 2021-to present

Bharat Mani Paudel (Nepali: भरतमणि पौडेल) is a Nepali standup comedian. He was a winner of Comedy Champion Season 2.

Bharat was born in the Fungling municipality of Taplejung, Nepal, as the eldest child of Shiva Prasad Paudel and Devi Paudel. The Paudel family belongs to the middle class and runs a coffee shop in Taplejung district, Nepal. He developed a keen interest in comedy at a young age and used to do mimicry of famous comedians, actors, and politicians. He is the eldest child in his family. Becoming the winner of Comedy Champion Season 2, Paudel emerged victorious after defeating Bikki Agarwal and Santosh Thapa, who were his fellow competitors. He has acted in the Nepali television series "Bhadragol".

== Comedy Champion Prize Money Controversy ==
In May 2023, while in Himalaya Television's 'Celebs Talk Show', Bharat stated that even after a year of winning Season 2 of Comedy Champion, he received only NRP 14 lakh 25 thousand (NRP 1.425 million) of the promised amount of the prize money, which was NPR 25 lakh rupees (NPR 2.5 million).
