= Taplejung 1 =

Parliamentary constituency in Nepal

- Parliamentary constituency
- Taplejung 1 in Koshi Province
- Province: Koshi Province
- District: Taplejung District

Current constituency
- Created: 1991
- Party: CPN (UML)
- Member of Parliament: Kshitij Thebe
- Member of the Provincial Assembly: Til Kumar Menyangbo Limbu, CPN (UML)
- Member of the Provincial Assembly: Khagen Singh Hangam, (NC)

Taplejung 1 is the parliamentary constituency of Taplejung District in Nepal. This constituency came into existence on the Constituency Delimitation Commission (CDC) report submitted on 31 August 2017.

== Incorporated areas ==
Taplejung 1 incorporates the entirety of Taplejung District.

== Assembly segments ==
It encompasses the following Koshi Province Provincial Assembly segment

- Taplejung 1(A)
- Taplejung 1(B)

== Members of Parliament ==
=== Parliament/Constituent Assembly ===
Election	Member	Party
1991	Kul Prasad Upreti	CPN (Unified Marxist–Leninist)
1994	Mani Lama	Nepali Congress
1999	Til Kumar Meyangbo Limbu	CPN (Unified Marxist–Leninist)
2008	Surya Man Gurung	Nepali Congress
2013	Bhupendra Thebe	CPN (Unified Marxist–Leninist)
2017	Yogesh Kumar Bhattarai	CPN (Unified Marxist–Leninist)
May 2018	Yogesh Kumar Bhattarai	Nepal Communist Party
March 2021	Yogesh Kumar Bhattarai	CPN (Unified Marxist–Leninist)
2022	Yogesh Kumar Bhattarai	CPN (Unified Marxist–Leninist)
2026	Kshitij Thebe	CPN (Unified Marxist–Leninist)

=== Provincial Assembly ===
==== 1(A) ====
Election	Member	Party
2017	Bal Bahadur Samsohang	CPN (Unified Marxist-Leninist)
May 2018	Bal Bahadur Samsohang	Nepal Communist Party
March 2021	Bal Bahadur Samsohang	CPN (Unified Marxist–Leninist)

==== 1(B) ====
Election	Member	Party
2017	Tanka Bahadur Angbuhang	CPN (Maoist Centre)
May 2018	Tanka Bahadur Angbuhang	Nepal Communist Party
March 2021	Tanka Bahadur Angbuhang	CPN (Maoist Centre)

== Election results ==
=== Election in the 2020s ===
==== 2026 general election ====
Candidate	Party	Votes	%
Kshitij Thebe	CPN (UML)	13,962	32.52
Gajendra Prasad Tumyang Limbu	Nepali Congress	11,711	27.28
Khel Prasad Budhachhetri	Nepali Communist Party	6,775	15.78
Santosh Rai	Shram Sanskriti Party	5,209	12.13
Birendra Shrestha	Rastriya Swatantra Party	4,155	9.68
Kirti Man Maden	Ujyaalo Nepal Party	232	0.54
Muksam Labung, Limbu	Sanghiya Loktantrik Rastriya Manch	221	0.51
Indra Prasad Thapa	Rastriya Prajatantra Party	185	0.43
Narpati Paudel	Nepal Communist Party (Maoist)	185	0.43
Arun Subba (Lechervo)	Janata Samajbadi Party	141	0.33
Surya Gurung	Janata Samjbadi Party, Nepal	55	0.13
Sant Bahadur Limbu	Mongol National Organisation	50	0.12
Indra Kumar Limbu	Nepal Janamukti Party	46	0.11
Total		42,927	100.00
Valid votes		42,927	94.11
Invalid/blank votes		2,686	5.89
Total votes		45,613	100.00
Majority		2,251	
CPN (UML) hold			

==== 2022 general election ====
Candidate	Party	Votes	%
Yogesh Bhattarai	CPN (UML)	21,943	47.30
Khel Prasad Budhachhetri	CPN (Maoist Centre)	21,735	46.85
Others		2,713	5.85
Total		46,391	100.00
Majority		208	
CPN (UML) hold			

==== 2022 provincial election ====
===== 1(A) =====
Candidate	Party	Votes	%
Til Bahadur Menyangbo	CPN (UML)	12,772	49.94
Khem Bahadur Wanem	CPN (Unified Socialist)	8,733	34.15
Bhupendra Mabo	Sanghiya Loktantrik Rastriya Manch	1,256	4.91
Chandra Bahadur Thapa	Rastriya Prajatantra Party	837	3.27
Mina Kumari Gurung	Independent	833	3.26
Yugaraj Gurung	People's Socialist Party	722	2.82
Others	423	1.65	
Total		25,576	100.00
Majority		4,039	
CPN (UML)			

===== 1(B) =====
Candidate	Party	Votes	%
Khagen Singh Hangam	Nepali Congress	10,496	49.90
Gopal Thopra	CPN (UML)	9,248	43.96
Others	1,292	6.14	
Total		21,036	100.00
Majority		1,248	
Nepali Congress			

=== Election in the 2010s ===
==== 2017 general election ====
Candidate	Party	Votes	%
Yogesh Bhattarai	CPN (UML)	29,479	59.74
Keshav Prasad Dahal	Nepali Congress	16,888	34.22
Bishnu Kumar Limbu	Sanghiya Loktantrik Rastriya Manch	1,591	3.22
Others		1,387	2.81
Total		49,345	100.00
Valid votes		49,345	95.49
Invalid/blank votes		2,333	4.51
Total votes		51,678	100.00
Majority		12,591	
CPN (UML) hold			

==== 2017 provincial elections ====
===== 1(A) =====
Party	Candidate	Votes
CPN (Unified Marxist–Leninist)	Bal Bahadur Samsohang	15,417
Nepali Congress	Lila Devi Bokhim	10,974
Others		1,462
Invalid votes		1,064
Result	CPN (UML) gain	
Source: Election Commission

===== 1(B) =====
Party	Candidate	Votes
Communist Party of Nepal (Maoist Centre)	Tanka Angbahang Limbu	12,198
Nepali Congress	Dipendra Kumar Sendang	7,587
Others		1,455
Invalid votes		1,706
Result	Maoist Centre gain	
Source: Election Commission

==== 2013 Constituent Assembly election ====
Candidate	Party	Votes	%
Bhupendra Thebe	CPN (UML)	7,434	32.02
Lila Devi Bokhim Limbu	Nepali Congress	7,295	31.42
Sanchapal Maden	UCPN (Maoist)	6,279	27.04
Amir Maden	Rastriya Prajatantra Party Nepal	1,004	4.32
Others		1,208	5.20
Total		23,220	100.00
Valid votes		23,220	96.38
Invalid/blank votes		873	3.62
Total votes		24,093	100.00
Registered voters/turnout		32,950	73.12
Majority		139	
CPN (UML) gain			

=== Election in the 2000s ===
==== 2008 Constituent Assembly election ====
Party	Candidate	Votes
Nepali Congress	Surya Man Gurung	8,719
CPN (Maoist)	Surendra Kumar Karki	8,407
CPN (Unified Marxist–Leninist)	Til Kumar Manyangbe	7,960
Sanghiya Loktantrik Rastriya Manch	Kritiman Maden	3,248
Others		561
Invalid votes		1,150
Result	Congress gain	
Source: Election Commission

=== Election in the 1990s ===
==== 1999 legislative elections ====
Party	Candidate	Votes
CPN (Unified Marxist–Leninist)	Til Kumar Meyangbo Limbu	13,636
Nepali Congress	Surya Man Gurung	13,472
Rastriya Janamukti Party	Padam Bahadur Yengden	1,786
Rastriya Prajatantra Party	Kedar Nath Dahal	1,502
CPN (Marxist–Leninist)	Kul Prasad Uprety	1,289
Independent	Ram Bahadur Thebe	427
Invalid Votes		606
Result	CPN (UML) gain	
Source: Election Commission

==== 1994 legislative elections ====
Party	Candidate	Votes
Nepali Congress	Mani Lama	10,742
CPN (Unified Marxist–Leninist)	Kaji Man Samsohang	9,822
Rastriya Prajatantra Party	Bijay Prakash Teve	4,877
Rastriya Janamukti Party	Nar Bahdur Maden	2,405
Result	Congress gain	
Source: Election Commission

==== 1991 legislative elections ====
Party	Candidate	Votes
CPN (Unified Marxist–Leninist)	Kul Prasad Upreti	12,703
Nepali Congress	Mani Lama	8,757
Result	CPN (UML) gain	

== See also ==
- List of parliamentary constituencies of Nepal
