= Amir Maden =

Nepalese politician

- अमिर मादेन

Mayor of Phungling Municipality
- Incumbent
- Assumed office 2022
- Deputy: Bhima Devi Ojha
- Preceded by: Chhatrapati Pyakurel

Personal details
- Party: Nepali Congress

Amir Maden (Nepali: अमिर मादेन) is a Nepalese politician and member of the Nepali Congress Party. He is currently serving as mayor of Phungling Municipality in Taplejung District. He defeated the CPN (Unified Marxist–Leninist) candidate, Chhatrapati Pyakurel, by receiving 6,179 votes.
