= Phungling Municipality =

District headquarters in Nepal

Phungling Municipality फुङ्लिङ नगरपालिका
- Municipality
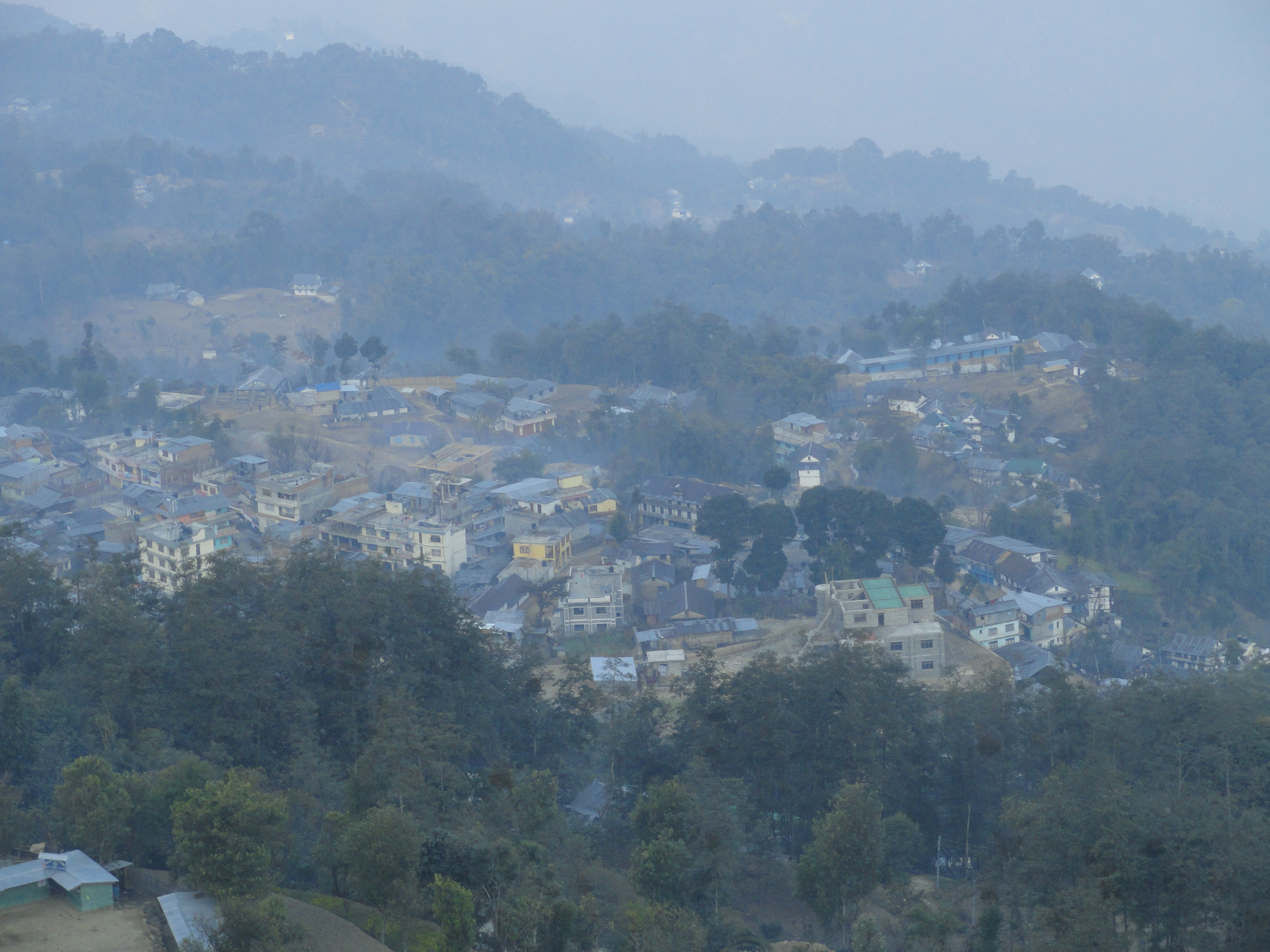
- Phungling bazaar

- Location in Province Phungling Municipality (Nepal)
- Coordinates: 27°21′23″N 87°40′13″E
- Country: Nepal
- Province: Koshi Province
- District: Taplejung District
- Established: 2014

Government
  - Type: Mayor-council
  - Mayor: Amir Maden (NC)
  - Deputy Mayor: Bhim Devi Ojha (CPN (UML))

Area
  - Total: 125.57 km^{2} (48.48 sq mi)
- Elevation: 1,441 m (4,728 ft)

Population (2011)
  - Total: 26,406
  - Density: 210.29/km^{2} (544.65/sq mi)

Languages
  - Local: Limbu, Sherpa, Nepali
- Time zone: UTC+5:45 (NST)
- Postal code: 57500
- Area code: 024
- Website: phunglingmun.gov.np

Phungling (Nepali: फुङ्लिङ) is a municipality located in Taplejung District in the Koshi Province of Nepal. The municipality was formed merging the then two Village Development Committees of Phungling and Dokhu in May 2014. At the time of the 2011 Nepal census it had a population of 19,085 people and 4,480 individual households.

== Background ==
Phungling was a Village Development Committee along with other 49 VDCs in Taplejung District before 2014. At the time of 2011 Nepal census, it had total population of 14,974 individuals and 3571 households. On 8 May 2014, Government of Nepal announced 72 new municipalities. The government merged 283 VDCs to create 72 new municipalities. Dokhu VDC was merged with Phungling VDC to form new Taplejung Municipality.

Taplejung Municipality
VDC	Population (2011)	Households
Phungling	14,974	3,571
Dokhu	4,111	909
Taplejung Municipality	19,085	4,480

On 10 March 2017, Nepal restructured the old administrative system into 753 new local level body thus Hangdeva, Phurumbu and Phawakhola VDCs merged with the then Taplejung municipality and renamed it as Phungling Municipality. After merging more VDCs to the old Taplejung municipality the total area increased to 125.57 square kilometres (48.48 sq mi) and total population became 26,406.

Phungling Municipality
Municipality/VDC	Population	Households
Taplejung Municipality	19,085	4,480
Hangdeva VDC	3,605	753
Phawakhola VDC	1,303	260
Phurumbu VDC	2,413	493
Phungling Municipality	26,406	5,986

It is located at 27°21'0N 87°40'0E with an altitude of 1441 metres (4730 feet).

== Demography ==
The main inhabitants in Phungling are Limbu, Chhetri, Tamang, Brahman, Sherpa, Bhote, Newar, and Gurung.

== Transportation ==
Phungling Municipality is linked with roadway and airway. It is connected to rest of the country through the Mechi Highway, a 268-km road which begins in Kechana of Jhapa district and ends in Taplejung. Passenger buses and jeeps to Taplejung are easily available in Birtamod. Suketar Airport has flights from Biratnagar and Kathmandu.

== Media ==
To promote local culture Phungling has 3 FM radio stations: Radio Tamor - 102.0 MHz which is a community radio station, Taplejung F.M. - 94.0 MHz and Radio Faktanglung 89.8 MHz.

== Pathibhara Devi Temple ==
One of the major attractions is the Pathibhara Devi Temple. A little-known region, It attracts tourists seeking spiritual fulfillment and blessings from the Pathibhara Devi. Kiranti, Hindus and Buddhists reach the temple for celebrations during special occasions. The trek to pathibhara Devi (3794 m) also includes natural and cultural experiences of the region. It takes a day to reach the temple on foot from Taplejung Bazaar. On the way to the temple are many species of rhododendron which are rare to see.

== Climate ==
Phungling has a subtropical highland climate (Cwb) with cool, dry winters and warm, rainy summers.

Climate data for Phungling (Taplejung District), elevation 1,744 m (5,722 ft), (1991–2020 normals, extremes 1987–2018)
Month	Jan	Feb	Mar	Apr	May	Jun	Jul	Aug	Sep	Oct	Nov	Dec	Year
Record high °C (°F)	22.3 (72.1)	27.4 (81.3)	27.0 (80.6)	28.6 (83.5)	28.2 (82.8)	29.9 (85.8)	29.5 (85.1)	29.4 (84.9)	28.4 (83.1)	29.6 (85.3)	24.7 (76.5)	24.0 (75.2)	29.9 (85.8)
Mean daily maximum °C (°F)	14.6 (58.3)	16.6 (61.9)	20.3 (68.5)	23.0 (73.4)	24.0 (75.2)	25.3 (77.5)	25.3 (77.5)	25.6 (78.1)	24.6 (76.3)	22.7 (72.9)	19.5 (67.1)	16.2 (61.2)	21.5 (70.7)
Daily mean °C (°F)	9.4 (48.9)	11.4 (52.5)	14.9 (58.8)	17.6 (63.7)	19.3 (66.7)	21.4 (70.5)	21.8 (71.2)	21.8 (71.2)	20.7 (69.3)	17.8 (64.0)	14.2 (57.6)	10.9 (51.6)	16.8 (62.2)
Mean daily minimum °C (°F)	4.1 (39.4)	6.2 (43.2)	9.4 (48.9)	12.2 (54.0)	14.6 (58.3)	17.4 (63.3)	18.2 (64.8)	17.9 (64.2)	16.8 (62.2)	12.9 (55.2)	8.8 (47.8)	5.6 (42.1)	12.0 (53.6)
Record low °C (°F)	−1.0 (30.2)	−0.3 (31.5)	2.2 (36.0)	4.6 (40.3)	8.5 (47.3)	10.0 (50.0)	12.6 (54.7)	14.0 (57.2)	11.2 (52.2)	6.5 (43.7)	3.4 (38.1)	−0.7 (30.7)	−1.0 (30.2)
Average precipitation mm (inches)	17.6 (0.69)	26.8 (1.06)	48.6 (1.91)	141.9 (5.59)	232.5 (9.15)	296.8 (11.69)	387.5 (15.26)	414.3 (16.31)	255.5 (10.06)	72.9 (2.87)	12.1 (0.48)	7.9 (0.31)	1,914.4 (75.37)
Average precipitation days (≥ 1.0 mm)	2.3	3.6	6.1	13.4	20.4	20.7	25.0	24.6	19.9	7.5	1.7	1.1	146.3
Source 1: World Meteorological Organization
Source 2: Department of Hydrology and Meteorology

== Notable person ==
- Chhurim, mountaineer, first woman to climb Everest twice in the same season.
- Te-ongsi Sirijunga Xin Thebe: Limbu martyr and legend.
- Til Kumar Menyangbo Limbu: Politician
- Surya Man Gurung:Politician
- Sanduk Ruit
