= Kul Prasad Uprety =

Nepalese politician

Ram Chandra Tiwari

Personal details
- Party: CPN UML

Kul Prasad Uprety is a Nepalese politician. Uprety contested the 1991 Nepalese legislative election as a Communist Party of Nepal (Unified Marxist-Leninist) candidate in the Taplejung-1 seat. He won the election, defeating Nepali Congress candidate Mani Lama, with 12703 votes (47.19%). In the 1994 election, he was substituted by Ambika Sawa as the CPN(UML) candidate in the constituency.

When CPN(UML) was divided, Uprety joined the dissident Communist Party of Nepal (Marxist-Leninist). He contested the 1999 legislative election as the CPN(ML) candidate in Taplejung-1, obtaining 1289 votes. The election was won by CPN(UML) candidate Til Kumar Menyangbo Limbu.
