= Amphu Labtsa pass =

Glaciated pass in Nepal

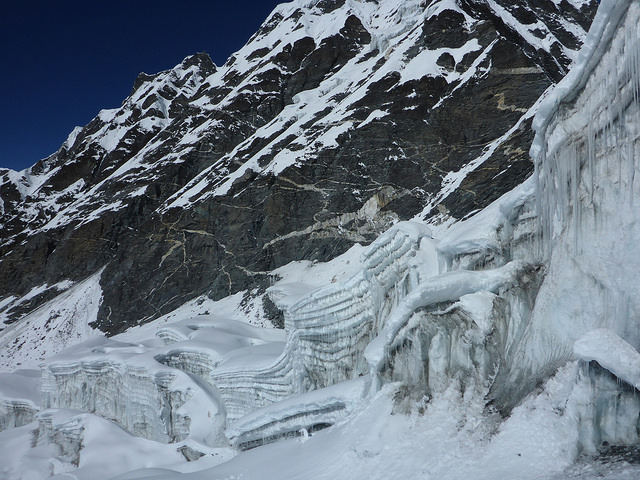
- Amphu Labtsa pass in Oct 2014

Highest point
- Elevation: 5,845 m (19,177 ft)
- Listing: Mountain passes of Nepal
- Coordinates: 27°52′02″N 86°55′14″E

Geography
- Location within Koshi Province Location within Nepal
- Location: Honku Valley, Nepal
- Parent range: Mahalangur Himalayas

Climbing
- Easiest route: snow/ice/glacier climb

Amphu Labtsa pass, elevation 5,845 metres (19,177 ft), is a glaciated pass covered in serac cliffs at the head of the Honku Valley. It provides a way out of the otherwise relatively isolated Honku valley. The base of the valley is at 5,000 m (16,400 ft) and has several glacial lakes including the Panch Pokhri or Five Sacred Lakes. The Amphu Labtsa pass is crossed by mountaineers en route to Island Peak or Baruntse expeditions and involves technical mountaineering. The ice and rock summit is quite exposed and provides good views of Lhotse Shar, Island Peak and the Imja Glacier. The way down into the Imja valley on the other side of the pass involves abseiling followed fixed rope descent. The approximate alpine grade of the Amphu Labtsa pass would be 'D'.
