= Khejenim =

Khejenim खेजेनिम
- Village development committee
- Location in Nepal
- Coordinates: 27.47°N 87.68°E
- Country: Nepal
- Province: Province No. 1
- District: Taplejung District

Population (2011)
  - Total: 2,406
- Time zone: UTC+5:45 (Nepal Time)

Khejenim is a village development committee in the Himalayas of Taplejung District in the Province No. 1 of northeastern Nepal. At the time of the 2011 Nepal census it had a population of 2,406 people living in 480 individual households. There were 1,186 males and 1,220 females at the time of census.
