= List of mountain passes of Nepal =

Mountain passes of Nepal

This is a list of mountain passes of Nepal.

== Notable mountain passes ==
Name	Province	Height	Notes	Ref(s)
Amphu Labtsa pass	Koshi Province	5,845 metres (19,177 ft)		
Cho La Pass	Koshi Province	5,420 metres (17,782 ft)		
Chiyo Bhanjyang	Koshi Province	3,139 metres (10,299 ft)		
Lho La	Koshi Province	6,026 m (19,770 ft)		
Nangpa La	Koshi Province	5,806 m (19,049 ft)		
Tipta La	Koshi Province	5,118 m (16,791 ft)		
Umbak Pass	Koshi Province	5,806 m (19,049 ft)		
Ghari La	Koshi Province	5,746 m (18,852 ft)		
Lumba Sumba	Koshi Province	5,160 m (16,930 ft)		
Kang La Pass	Gandaki Province	5,306 metres (17,408 ft)		
Kora La	Gandaki Province	4,660 metres (15,290 ft)		
Thorong La	Gandaki Province	5,416 metres (17,769 ft)		
Larkya La	Gandaki Province	5,106 metres (16,752 ft)		
Nyalu Lagna Pass	Karnali Province	4,995 metres (16,388 ft)		
Tinkar Pass	Sudurpashchim Province	5,258 metres (17,251 ft)		
Lipulekh Pass	Sudurpashchim Province	5,110 metres (16,770 ft)	Claimed by Nepal	
Limpiyadhura Pass	Sudurpashchim Province	5,530 metres (18,140 ft)	Claimed by Nepal	
Mangsha Dhura	Sudurpashchim Province	5,490 metres (18,010 ft)	Claimed by Nepal	
