= Manoj Gajurel =

Nepalese comedian and television personality

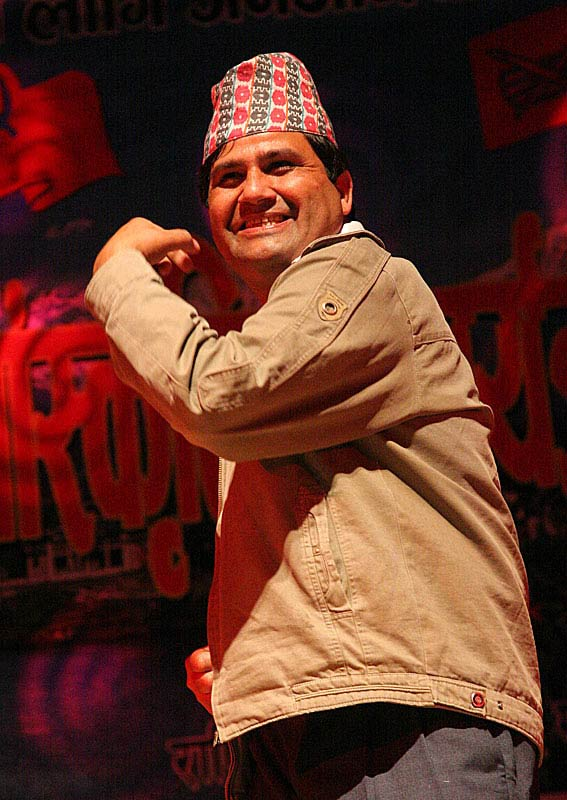
- Born: 12 May 1969 (age 57); Khebang, Taplejung, Nepal
- Education: Tribhuwan University
- Years active: 2007–present
- Spouses: Mina Dhakal (m. 1994–2019) Manju Pokhrel (m. 2021)
- Website: www.gajureal.com

Manoj Gajurel (born 12 May 1969) is a Nepalese comedian, actor, singer, model, and judge of a stand-up reality show called Comedy Champion.

== Childhood ==
Born on 12 May 1969, Manoj Gajurel was raised by his mother Indramaya Gajurel and brother Keshav Gajurel after the demise of his father Bhawani Prasad Gajurel just after 4 months of his birth. He changed 11 schools until he passed School Leaving Certificate.

== Career ==
He started his career early as soon as he completed the master's degree in Mass Communication from Tribhuwan University. He performed acts and released audio cassettes like Photocopy, HAHAHA, ManojRanjan, etc. which are the popular releases from him.

He also started performing mimicry of popular political leaders like Puspa Kamal Dahal "Prachanda", Gyanendra Shah, Narendra Modi, Donald Trump etc. After his regular presentations through audios and radio programs, he has offered so many stage programs. He has visited almost all districts Of Nepal and many countries s to attend stage programs.

== Filmography ==
Year	Title	Role	Notes
2010	Pooja	Cast	Kamana Film Award 2076 – Best Actor in a Supporting Role (Male)
2019	100 Kada 10	Cast	

== Television ==
Year	Title	Role	Notes
2019	Comedy Champion	Judge	

== Gallery ==
Manoj Gajure's various characters

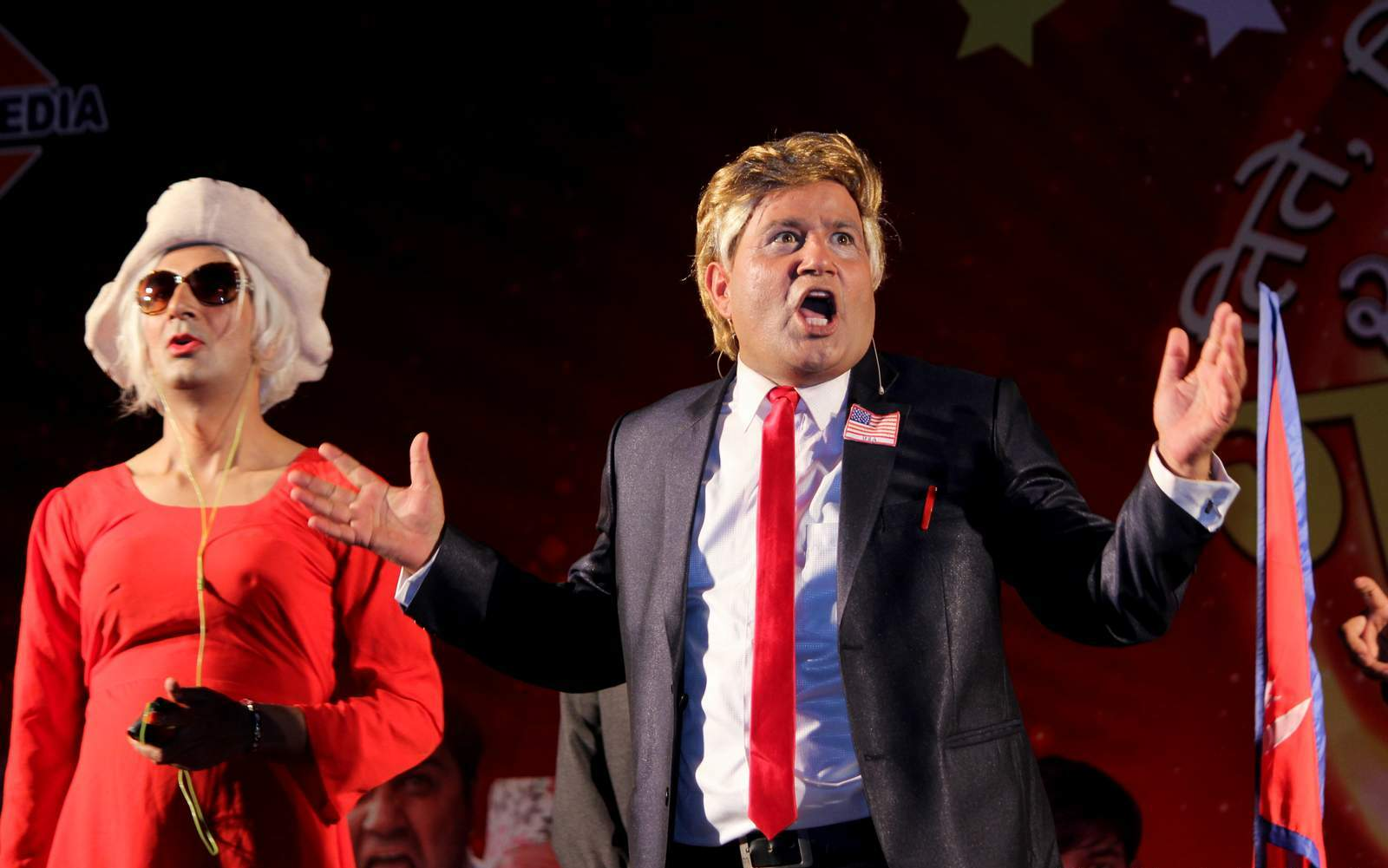

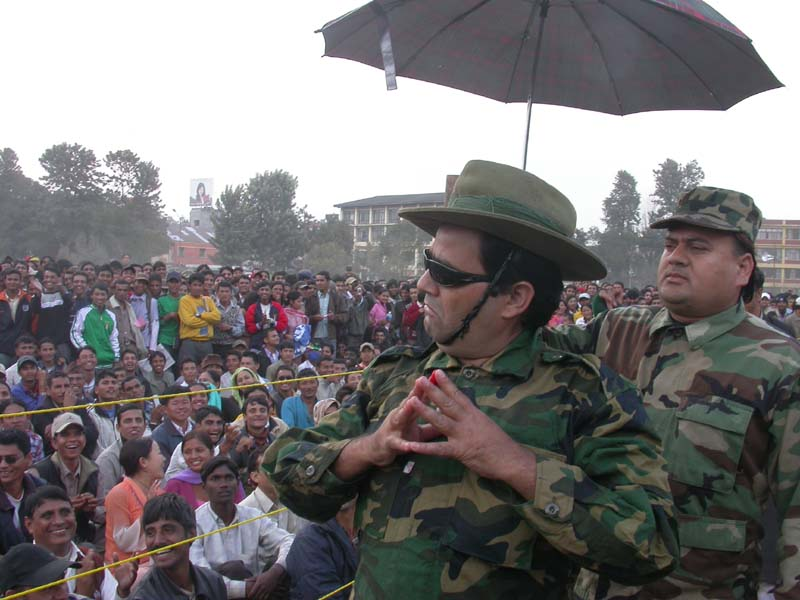

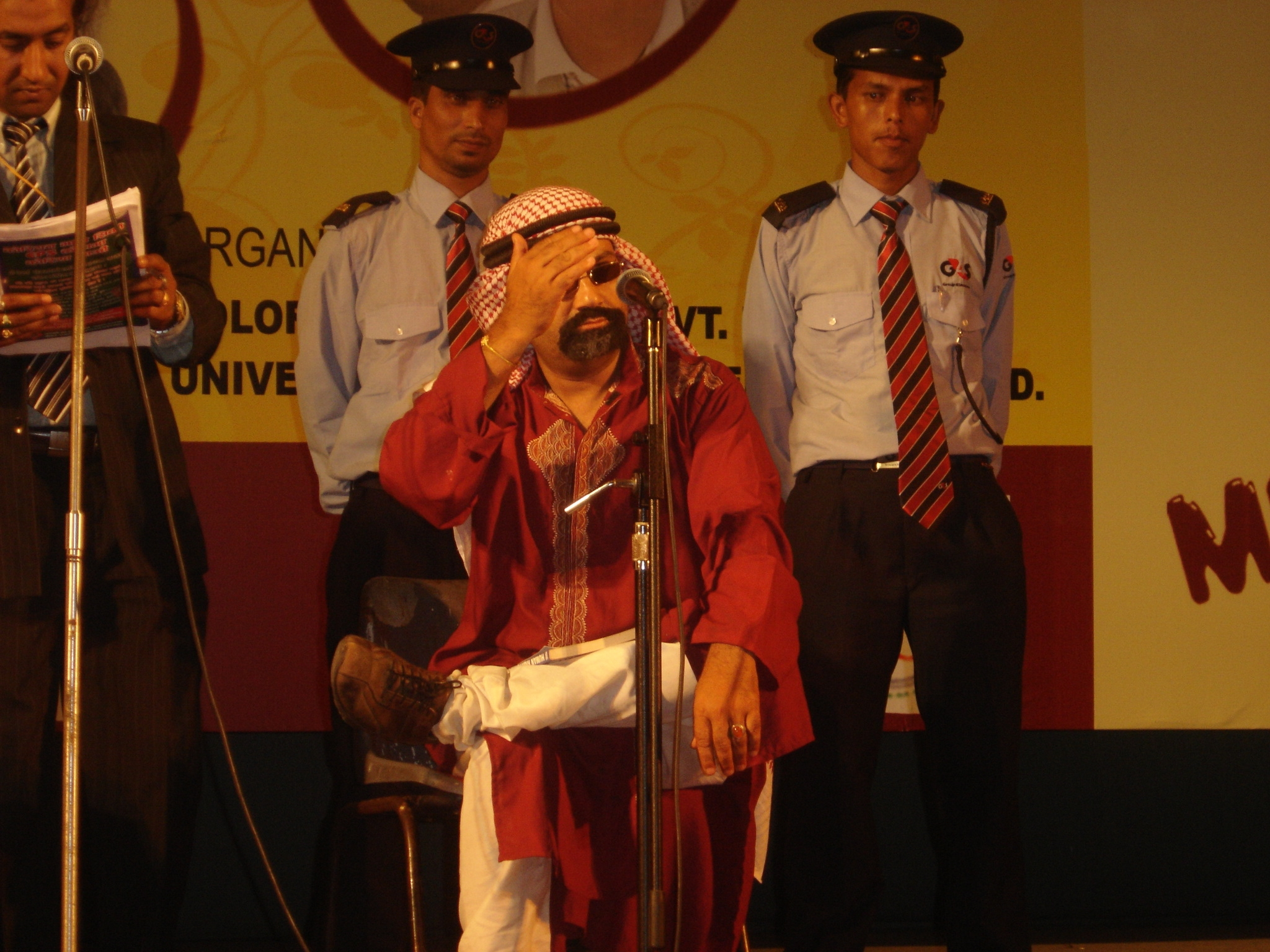

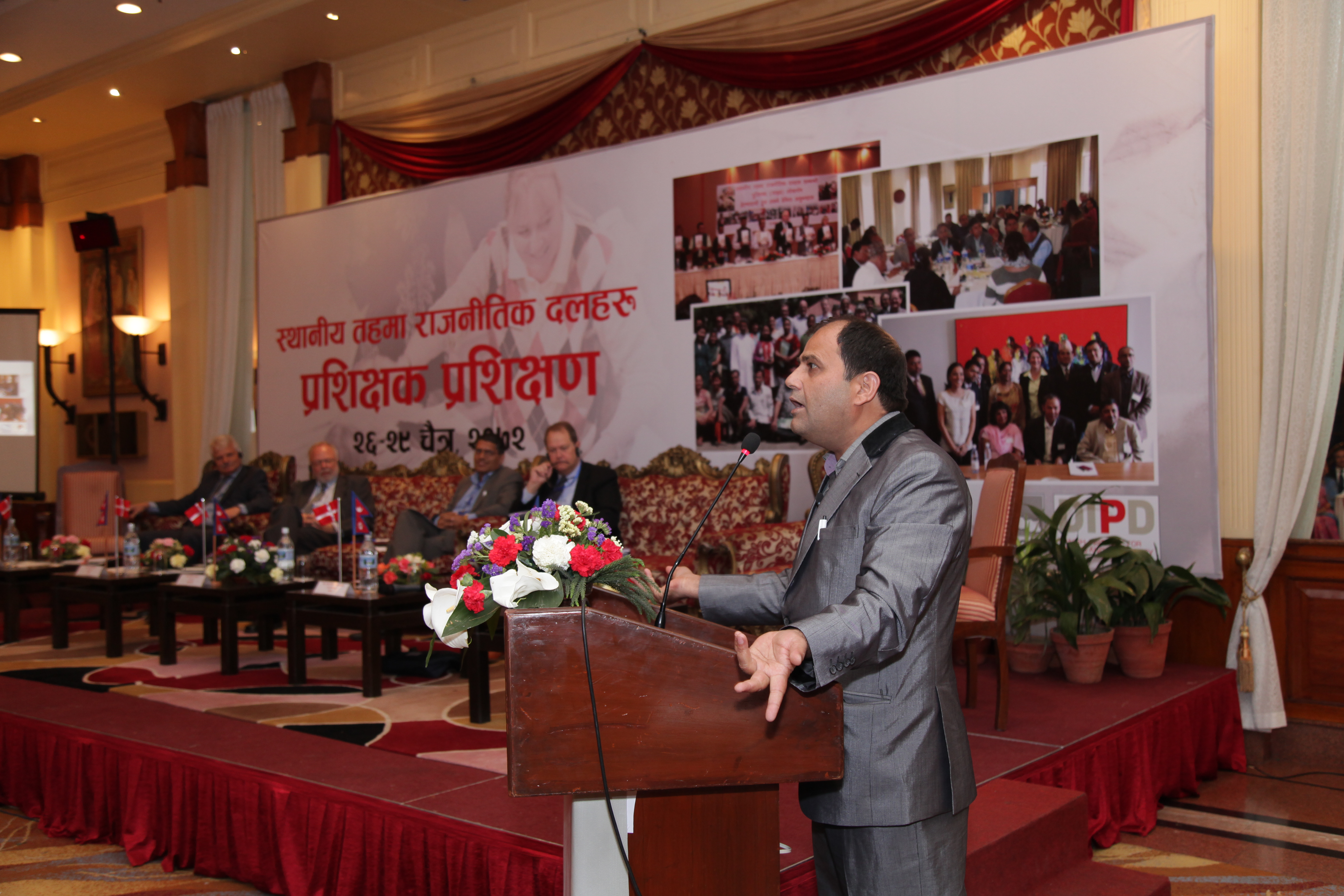

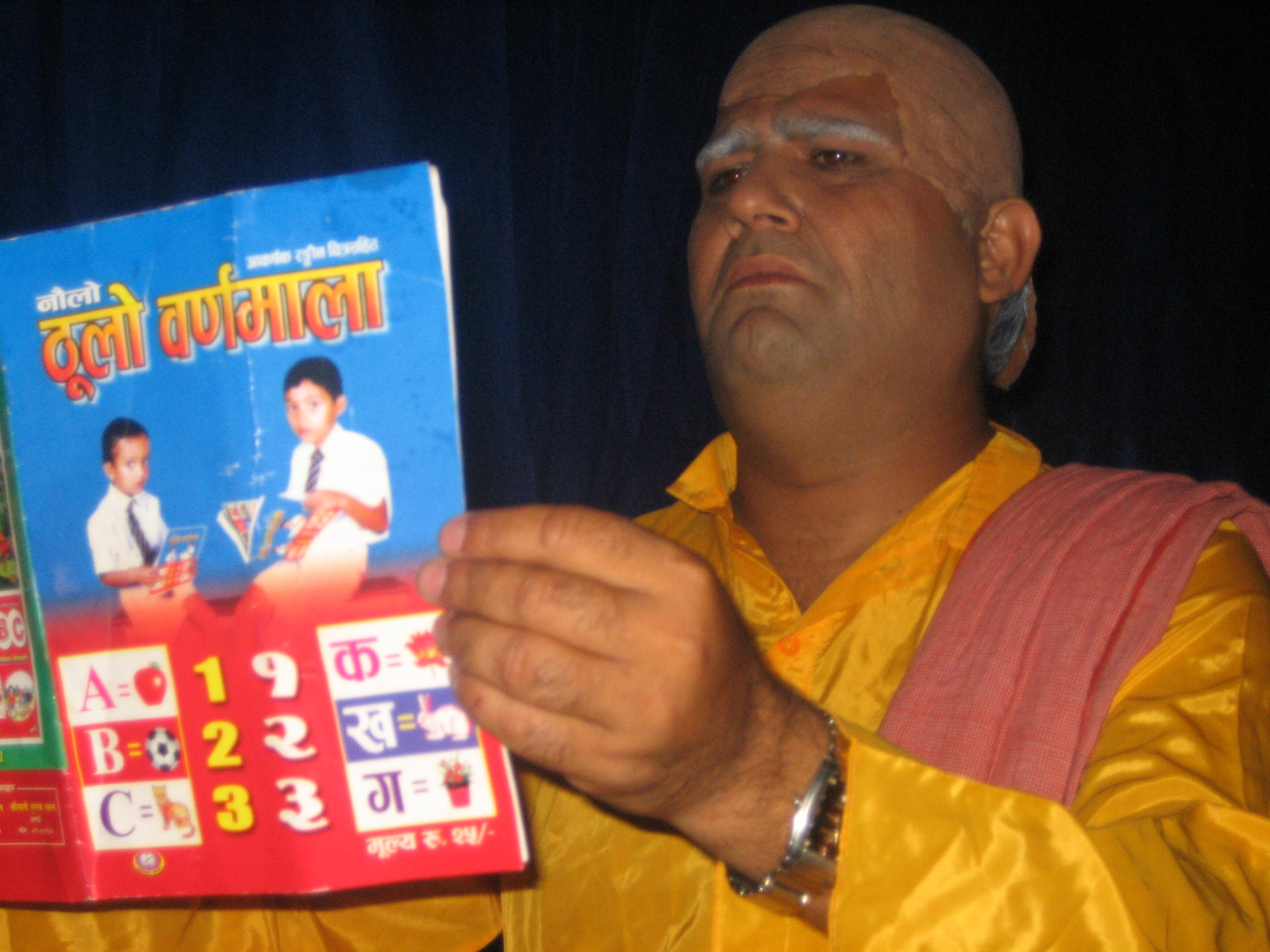

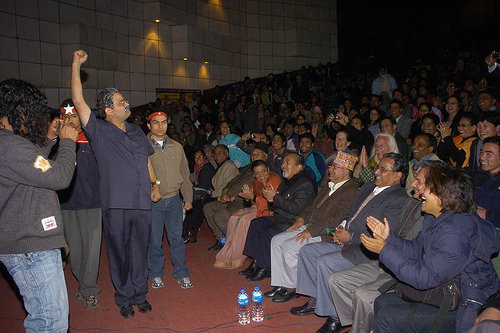

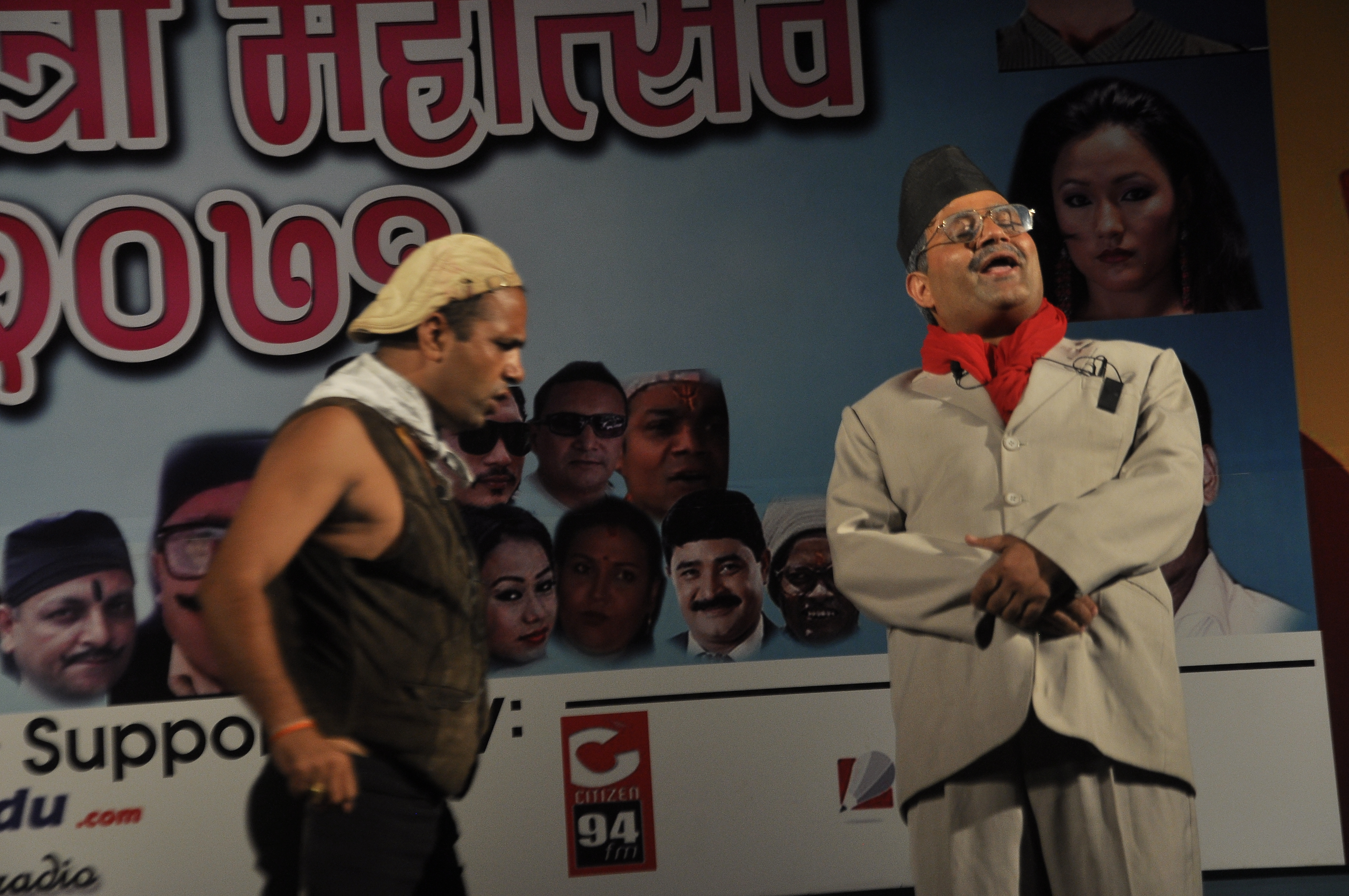

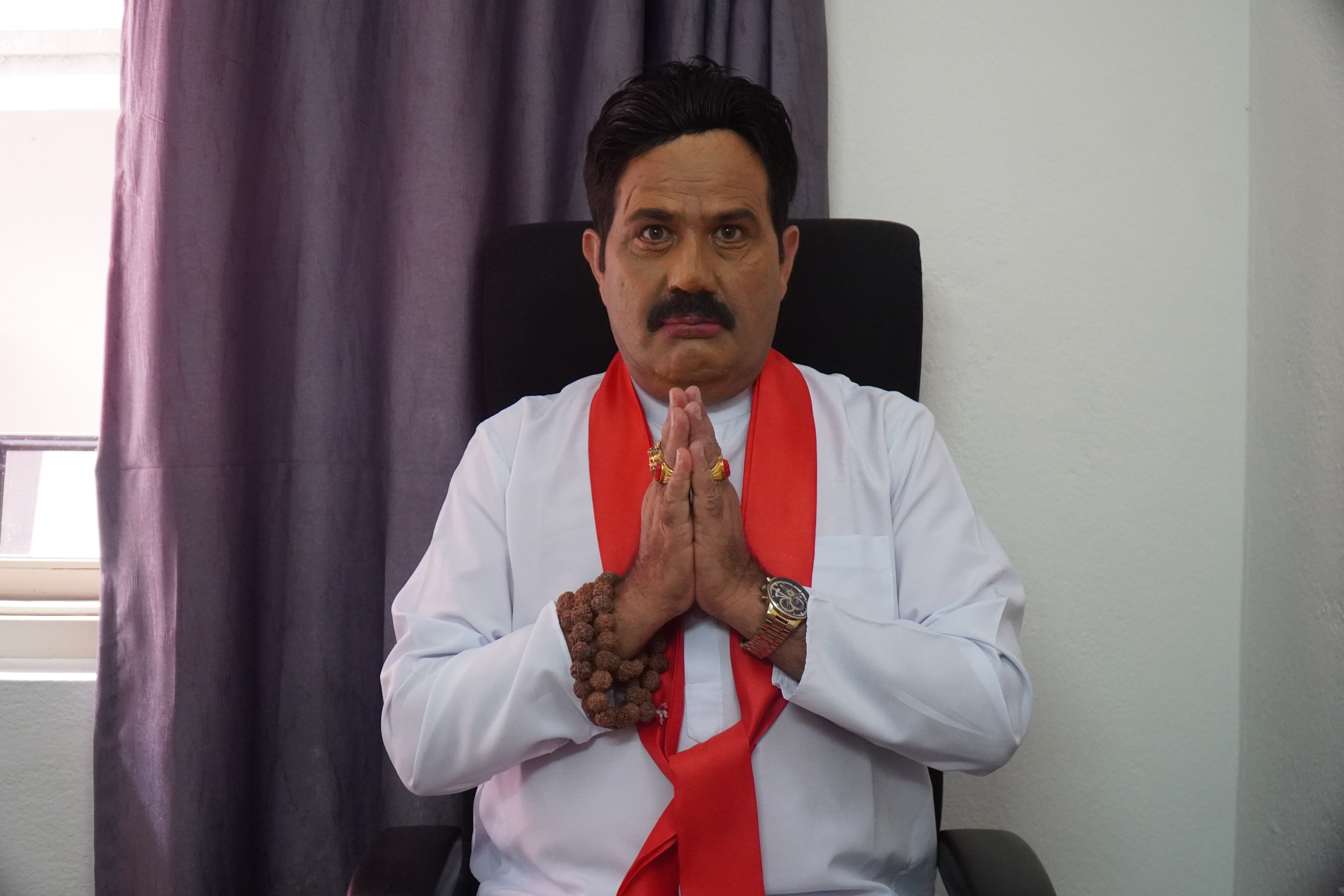
