= Maiwakhola Rural Municipality =

- མཻ་ཝ་ཁོ་ལ་གྲོང་གསེབ་གྲོང་ཁྱེར
- Location in Nepal
- Coordinates: 27.351075°N 087.534817°E
- Country: Nepal
- Province: Province No. 1
- District: Taplejung
- Rural Municipality: Maiwakhola
- Established: 10 March 2021

Government
  - Type: Gaunpalika
  - Chairperson: Bijaya Prakash Wanem (CPN (Maoist))
  - Vice-chairperson: Kamal Kumari wanem (NC)

Area
  - Total: 136 km^{2} (53 sq mi)

Population (2021)
  - Total: 10,213
  - Density: 75.1/km^{2} (194/sq mi)
- Time zone: UTC+5:45 (NST)
- Website: Official Website

Maiwakhola is a rural municipality located in the Taplejung District in the Province No. 1 of eastern Nepal. The total area of the municipality is 138 km^{2}. The local body was formed on 10 March 2021 by merging three VDCs of Phakumba, Sanghu and Dhungesanghu. Currently, it has a total of 6 wards.

== Demographics ==
The population of Maiwakhola, as of the 2021 Nepal census, is 10,213. The largest ethnic groups are Limbu, with 46.1% of the population, Sherpa with 31.6% of the population, and Tamang with 10.6% of the population. The most common religions are Kirat, with 45.0% of the population, Bouddha with 42.5% of the population, and Hindu with 11.4% of the population.

84.4% of the population work in agriculture. The literacy rate is 79.9%.

== Notable people ==
- Madan Bhandari, politician
- Yogesh Bhattarai, politician
- Malvika Subba, model
