= Sanghu, Taplejung =

Sanghu साँघु
- Former Village development committee
- Location in Nepal
- Coordinates: 27.34°N 87.52°E
- Country: Nepal
- Province: Koshi Province
- Rural Municipality: Taplejung District
- District: Maiwakhola Rural Municipality

Population (2011)
  - Total: 3,813
- Time zone: UTC+5:45 (Nepal Time)

Sangu is a former village development committee in the Maiwakhola Rural Municipality of Taplejung District in the Koshi Province of north-eastern Nepal. At the time of the 2011 Nepal census it had a population of 3,813 people living in 755 individual households. There were 1,813 males and 2,000 females at the time of census.
