= Sinam, Taplejung =

Sinam सिनाम
- Village development committee
- Location in Nepal
- Coordinates: 27.31°N 87.83°E
- Country: Nepal
- Province: Province No. 1
- District: Taplejung District

Population (2011)
  - Total: 2,093
- Time zone: UTC+5:45 (Nepal Time)
- Postal code: 57503
- Area code: 024

Sinam is a village development committee in the Himalayas of Taplejung District in the Province No. 1 of north-eastern Nepal. At the time of the 2011 Nepal census it had a population of 2,093 people living in 461 individual households. There were 977 males and 1,116 females at the time of census.
