= Comedy Champion =

Nepali comedy reality show

- Title screen of the program
- Created by: Three Productions
- Written by: Suman Karki; Suman Koirala; Pujan Adhikari
- Directed by: Bishal Bhandari
- Presented by: Rima Bishwokarma; Mexam Gaudel
- Music by: Arjun Pokharel
- Country of origin: Nepal
- Original language: Nepali
- No. of seasons: 3

Production
- Executive producers: Keki Adhikari; Bishal Bhandari; Raj Ghimire
- Editors: Gambhir Rajkarnikar; Ram Pakhrin Tamang; Anil Shrestha
- Running time: 90 minutes
- Production company: Three Productions

Original release
- Network: Kantipur Television
- Release: 2019 – present

Comedy Champion (कमेडी च्याम्पियन) is a Nepali stand-up comedy reality show which started airing on Kantipur Television and OSR Reality channel on YouTube since 2019. It is the first comedy reality show in Nepal. The show features emerging standup comedians from different parts of Nepal. The show primarily has standalone comedic appearances of the contestants, with some episodes of paired performances. The show is created by Three Production with OSR Reality, they are leading reality show production companies in Nepal.

== Overview ==
Comedy Champion features Santosh Panta, Manoj Gajurel, Reecha Sharma and Pradip Bhattarai as the judges and Rima Bishwokarma & Mexam Gaudel as the hosts of the show. One of the contestants from season 1, Bishnu Prasad Gaudel (a.k.a. Mexam Gaudel) hosted season 2 alongside Rima Bishowkarma.

The first season premiered at the end of 2019 and ended in 2020. Himesh Panta won the title in the first season. Khadga Bahadur Pun Magar and Suman Koirala became runner-ups. The second season premiered in 2021, and the title was won by Bharat Mani Poudel, where Bkey Agarwal and Santosh Thapa became first and second runner-ups respectively.

The third season of the show premiered in 2024. The show is also directed by Bishal Bhandari with television producer Babu Surace D.C. as chief associate director. Sunil Khadka from Dakshinkali, Kathmandu won the title.

== Format ==
A digital audition takes place prior to the physical audition. The stage performance starts with a physical audition which takes place with contestants selected from a digital audition. Only the performances of the 24 contestants selected from a physical audition are aired. Top 15 contestants are then selected by judges based on their individual stage performances. The top 15 contestants are then contested with each other to select the top 10 performances. Top 10 contestants are also selected by the judges based upon their individual stage performance.

The show then moves forward with the elimination of one contestant every week based on audience voting through the IME pay mobile app. This process continues until there are only six contestants left. All the other contestants who were eliminated earlier get a chance to comeback through a special entry program called wildcard, where two contestants are selected; one is directly chosen by the judges as performer of the week and the other one from audience voting. The show then moves ahead with the elimination of one member each week who achieves the least audience votes until the last three contestants remain for the season. The season finale airs with the remaining last three contestants. The season ends with the contestant with the highest number of audience votes along the week being declared the winner of Comedy Champion for the season.

The winner of the show wins Rs. 2,500,000 and a brand new car as the prize.

== Season summary ==
Year	Season	Host	Judges	Winner	Runner-ups	Ref(s)
2019-2020	1	Rima Bishwokarma	Santosh Panta; Manoj Gajurel; Reecha Sharma; Pradip Bhattarai	Himesh Panta	Khadga Bahadur Pun Magar; Suman Koirala	
2021	2	Rima Bishwokarma; Mexam Gaudel	Santosh Panta; Manoj Gajurel; Reecha Sharma; Pradip Bhattarai	Bharat Mani Poudel	Bickey Agrawal; Santosh Thapa	
2024	3	Rima Bishwokarma; Mexam Gaudel	Santosh Panta; Manoj Gajurel; Reecha Sharma; Pradip Bhattarai	Sunil Khadka	Rishav Kafle; Suyasha Khanal	

== See also ==
- Comedy Club with Champions
