= Sirijangha Rural Municipality =

- Location in Nepal
- Coordinates: 27°24′35.96″N 87°54′35.94″E
- Country: Nepal
- Development Region: Eastern
- Zone: Mechi
- District: Taplejung
- Province: Province No. 1
- Rural Municipality: Sirijangha
- Established: 10 March 2017

Government
  - Type: Gaunpalika
  - Chairperson: Mr.Tikaram Gurung (NC)
  - Vice-chairperson: Mrs.Gyanmaya chuhan Gautam (NC)

Area
  - Total: 481.09 km^{2} (185.75 sq mi)

Population (2017)
  - Total: 15,806
  - Density: 32.855/km^{2} (85.093/sq mi)
- Time zone: UTC+5:45 (NST)
- Website: Official Website

Sirijangha is a Gaupalika (Nepali: गाउँपालिका, romanized: gaunpalika, formerly: village development committee) located in Taplejung District in the Mechi Zone of eastern Nepal. The local body was formed by merging eight VDCs Sinaam, Aambegudin, Sikaicha, Tellok, Pedanga, Mamankhe, Khewang, Yamphudin. Currently, it has a total of 8 wards. The population of the rural municipality is 15,806 according to the data collected on 2017 Nepalese local elections.

== Population ==
As per 2017, Sirijangha hosts a population of 15,806 across a total area of 481.09 km^{2}.

== See also ==
- Taplejung District
