= Sawadin =

Sawadin सवादिन
- Village development committee
- Location in Nepal
- Coordinates: 27.43°N 87.68°E
- Country: Nepal
- Province: Province No. 1
- District: Taplejung District

Population (2011)
  - Total: 1,461
- Time zone: UTC+5:45 (Nepal Time)

Sawadin is a village development committee in the Himalayas of Taplejung District in the Province No. 1 of north-eastern Nepal. At the time of the 2011 Nepal census it had a population of 1,461 people living in 297 individual households. There were 676 males and 785 females at the time of census.
