= Phakumba =

Phakumba फाकुम्बा
- Former Village development committee
- Location in Nepal
- Coordinates: 27.41°N 87.49°E
- Country: Nepal
- Province: Koshi Province
- District: Taplejung District
- Rural Municipality: Maiwakhola Rural Municipality

Population (2011)
  - Total: 3,476
- Time zone: UTC+5:45 (Nepal Time)

Phakumba is a former village development committee in the Maiwakhola Rural Municipality of Taplejung District in the Koshi Province of north-eastern Nepal. At the time of the 2011 Nepal census it had a population of 3,476 people living in 693 individual households. There were 1,647 males and 1,829 females at the time of census.
