= Sidingba Rural Municipality =

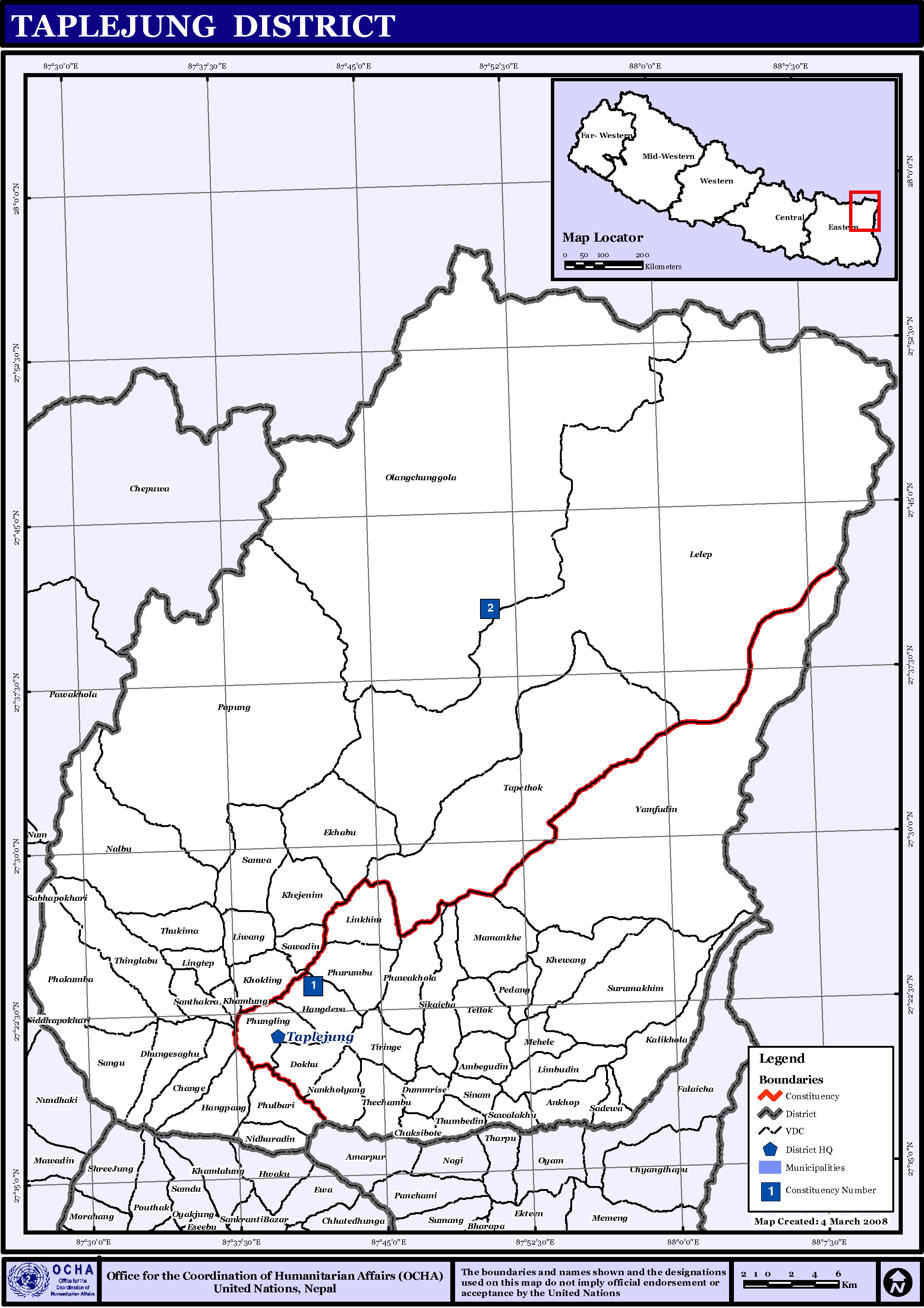
- Taplejung District municipalities including Sidingba

- Location in Nepal
- Coordinates: 27°18′18.67″N 87°56′29.2″E
- Country: Nepal
- Province: Koshi Province
- District: Taplejung
- Rural Municipality: Sidingba
- Established: 10 March 2017

Government
  - Type: Gaunpalika
  - Chairperson: Mr. Man Bahadur Rai (CPN UML)
  - Vice-chairperson: Mrs. Krishna Kumari Kadariya (NCP)

Area
  - Total: 206 km^{2} (80 sq mi)

Population (2021)
  - Total: 10,979
  - Density: 53.3/km^{2} (138/sq mi)
- Time zone: UTC+5:45 (NST)
- Website: Official Website

Sidingwa is a Gaupalika (Nepali: गाउपालिका, romanized: gaupalika, formerly: village development committee) located in Taplejung District in the Koshi Province of eastern Nepal. The local body was formed by merging seven VDCs namely Limbudin, Kalikhola, Sadewa, Ankhop, Sablakhu, Mehele, Surumkhim. Currently, it has a total of 7 wards. The population of the rural municipality is 12,099 according to the data collected on 2017 Nepalese local elections.

== Demographics ==
According to the 2021 Nepal census, the total population of the rural municipality is 10,979 individuals in which 5,531 individuals are male and the remaining 5,448 are female. These populations live in total 2,476 households. 80% of the population are considered as educated.

In the context of ethnic groups in the rural municipality Limbu people or Yakthung is the biggest ethnic group. Kshetri, Rai people, Bishwakarma, Tamang people, Bahun, Gurung people, Yakkha, Newar people and Mijar are following continuously on second, third, forth and so on.

Ethnic groups according to (2021)
1. Limbu people (32.5%)
2. Kshetri (25.2%)
3. Rai people (19.2%)
4. Bishwakarma (4.60%)
5. Tamang people (4.40%)
6. Bahun (3.60%)
7. Gurung people (2.90%)
8. Yakkha (2.00%)
9. Newar people (1.60%)
10. Mijar (1.40%)
11. Others (2.60%)

== See also ==
- Taplejung District
