= Lelep =

Lelep लेलेप
- Village development committee
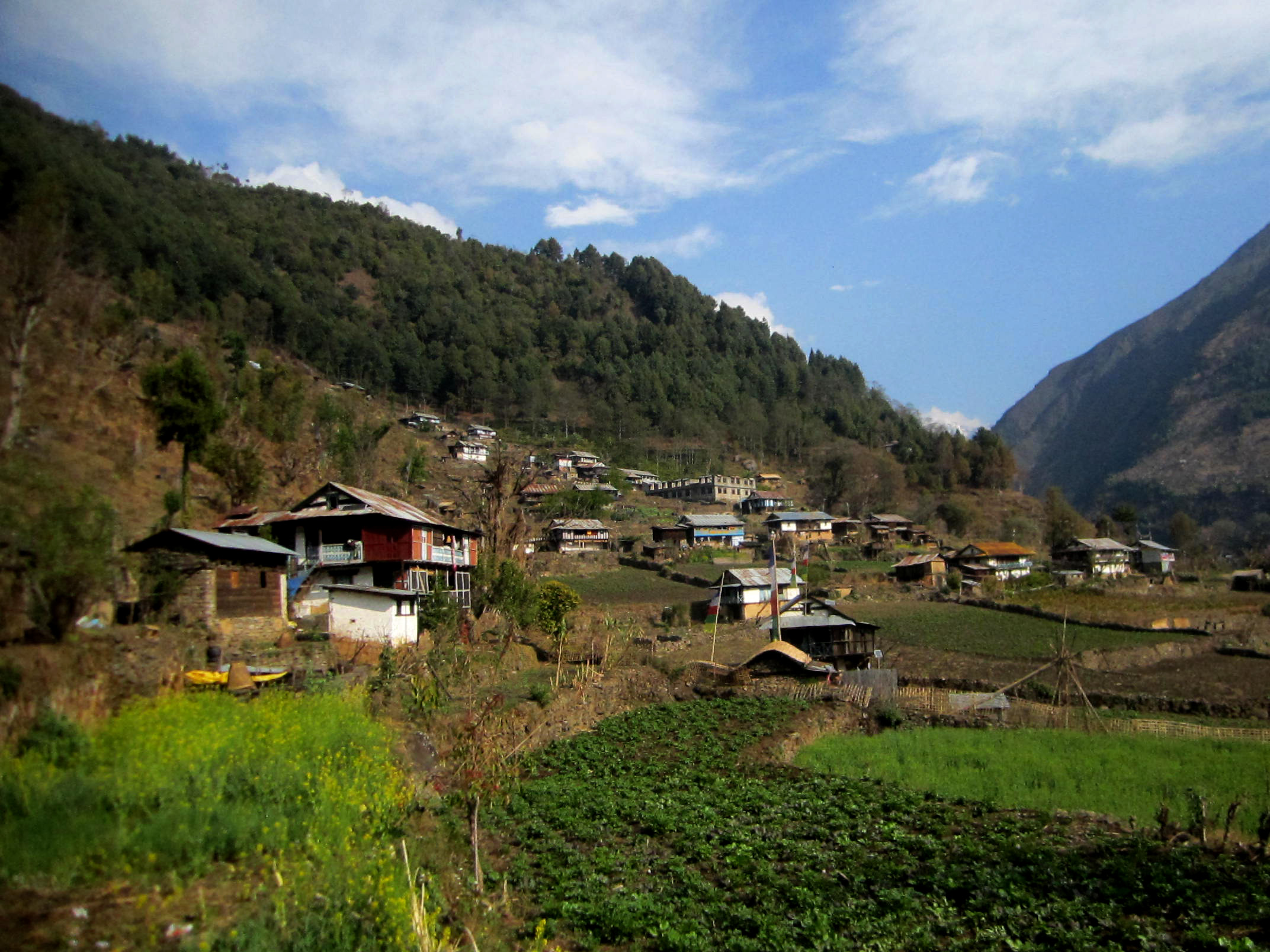

- Location in Nepal
- Coordinates: 27.5264°N 87.8°E
- Country: Nepal
- Province: Province No. 1
- District: Taplejung District

Population (2011)
  - Total: 2,205
- Time zone: UTC+5:45 (Nepal Time)

Lelep is a village development committee in the Himalayas of Taplejung District in the Province No. 1 of north-eastern Nepal. At the time of the 2011 Nepal census it had a population of 2,205 people living in 511 individual households. There were 1,122 males and 1,083 females at the time of census. It is currently a part of Phaktanglung Rural Municipality.
