= Tapethok =

Tapethok तापेथोक
- Village development committee
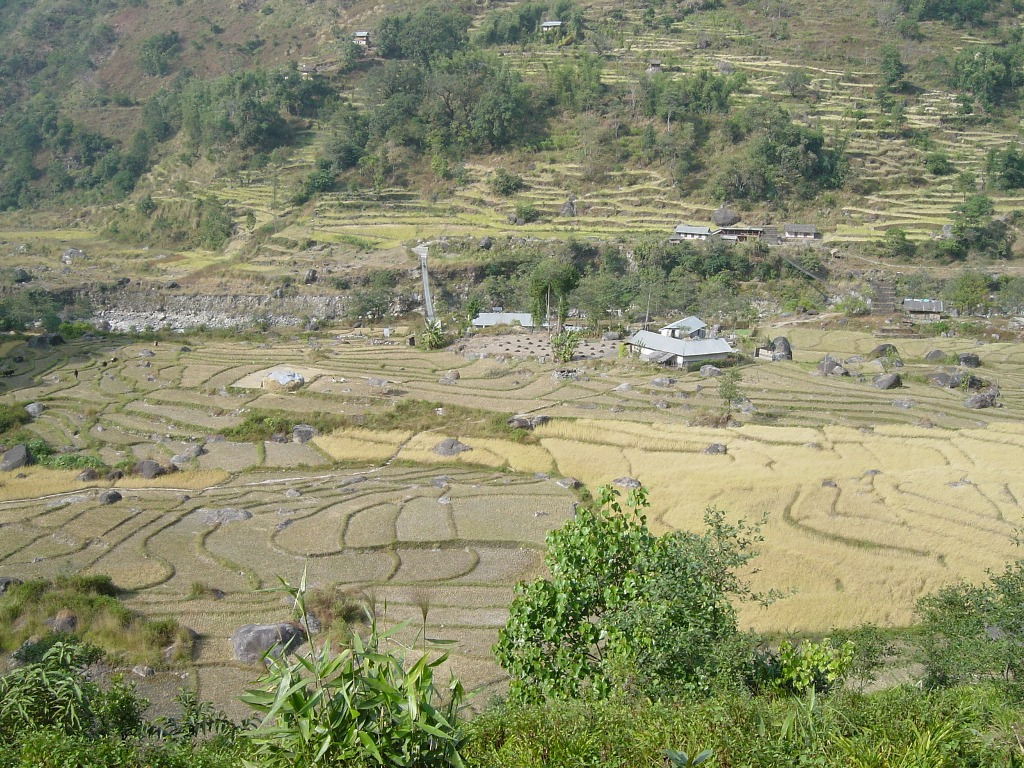

- Location in Nepal
- Coordinates: 27.54°N 87.88°E
- Country: Nepal
- Province: Province No. 1
- District: Taplejung District

Population (1991)
  - Total: 1,292
- Time zone: UTC+5:45 (Nepal Time)

Tapethok is a village development committee in the Himalayas of Taplejung District in the Province No. 1 of north-eastern Nepal. At the time of the 1991 Nepal census, it had a population of 1,292 people living in 253 individual households.
