= Pathibhara Yangwarak Rural Municipality =

Pathibhara Yangwarak
- Location in Nepal
- Coordinates: 27°18′05″N 87°44′38″E
- Country: Nepal
- Development Region: Eastern
- Zone: Mechi
- District: Taplejung
- Province: Province No. 1
- Rural Municipality: Yangbarak

Government
  - Chairperson: Mr. Keshar Kumar Subba (NCP)
  - Vice-chairperson: Mrs.Ranamaya Gurung (NCP)

Area
  - Total: 93.76 km^{2} (36.20 sq mi)

Population (2017)
  - Total: 13,591
  - Density: 145.0/km^{2} (375.4/sq mi)
- Time zone: UTC+5:45 (NST)
- Website: official website

Pathibhara Yangwarak (Nepali: पाथीभरा याङवरक) is a rural municipality (Gaunpalika) in Taplejung District of Province No. 1 of Nepal. Formerly the rural municipality was divided into many village development committees) located in Taplejung District in the Mechi Zone of EDR of Nepal. The local body came in existence when those VDCs: Nyangkholchyang, Thechambu, Tiringe, Dumrise, Chaksibot and Thumbedin merged after decision of MoFALD. Currently, it has a total of 6 wards. The population of the rural municipality is 13,591 according to the data collected on 2017 Nepalese local elections.

== Population ==
As per 2017, Yangabarak hosts a population of 13,591 across a total area of 93.76 km^{2}.

== See also ==
- Taplejung District
