= Aathrai Tribeni Rural Municipality =

Aathrai Tribeni
- Location in Province No. 1 Aathrai Tribeni (Nepal)
- Coordinates: 27°18′26.07″N 87°36′32.77″E
- Country: Nepal
- Province: Province
- District: Taplejung
- Total wards: 5
- Established: 10 March 2017

Government
  - Type: Rural Council
  - Chairperson: Mr Dipendra Pomu (UML)
  - Vice-chairperson: Mrs. Shanta Kumari Angbuhang(UML)

Area
  - Total: 88.83 km^{2} (34.30 sq mi)

Population (2011)
  - Total: 13,784
  - Density: 155.2/km^{2} (401.9/sq mi)
- Time zone: UTC+5:45 (NST)
- Website: Official Website

Aathrai Tribeni (Nepali: आठराई त्रिवेणी) is a rural municipality (gaunpalika) out of eight rural municipality located in Taplejung District of Province No. 1 of Nepal. There are a total of 9 municipalities in Taplejung in which 1 is urban and 7 are rural.

The local body was formed by merging four VDCs namely Nighuradin, Fulbari, Hangpang, Change. Currently, it has a total of 5 wards. The population of the rural municipality is 13,784 according to the data collected on 2017 Nepalese local elections.

== Population ==
As per 2017, Aathrai Tribeni hosts a population of 13,784 across a total area of 88.83 km^{2}.

== See also ==
- Taplejung District
