= Mikkwakhola Rural Municipality =

Mikkwakhola
- मिक्वाखोला
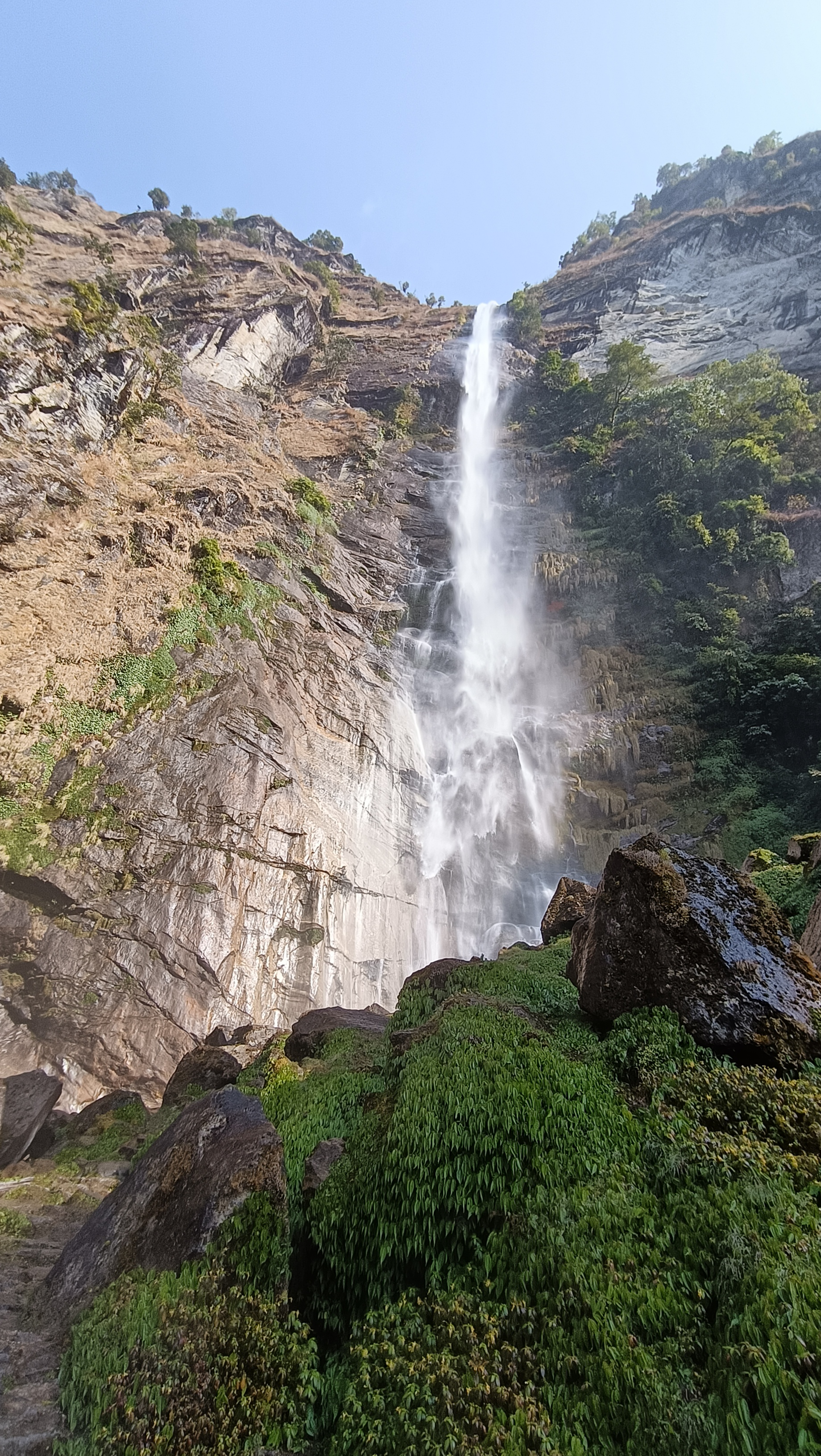
- Phungphunge Waterfall located at Mikkwakhola Rural Municipality

- Location in Nepal
- Coordinates: 27°31′1.19″N 87°36′34.92″E
- Country: Nepal
- Development Region: Eastern
- Zone: Mechi
- District: Taplejung
- Province: Province No. 1
- Rural Municipality: Mikkwakhola
- Established: 10 March 2017

Government
  - Chairperson: Mr.Ramkumar Saanwa (NCP)
  - Vice-chairperson: Mrs.Rudrakumari Limbu Saanwa (NC)

Area
  - Total: 442.96 km^{2} (171.03 sq mi)

Population (2021)
  - Total: 7,964
  - Density: 17.98/km^{2} (46.57/sq mi)
- Time zone: UTC+5:45 (NST)
- Website: official website

Mikkwakhola is a Gaupalika (Nepali: गाउपालिका, romanized: gaupalika, formerly: village development committee) located in Taplejung District in the Mechi Zone of eastern Nepal. The local body was formed by merging four VDCs, namely Khokling, Liwang, Sanwa, Papung. Currently, it has a total of 7 wards. The population of the rural municipality is 9,160 according to the data collected on 2017 Nepalese local elections.

== Demographics ==
The population of Mikkwakhola, as of the 2021 Nepal census, is 7,964. The largest ethnic group is Limbu, with 47.8% of the population; other major ethnic groups include Sherpa with 20.4% of the population, Kshetri with 11.5% of the population, and Topkegola with 7.8% of the population. The most common religion is Kirat, with 47.2% of the population; other major religions include Bouddha with 31.9% of the population and Hindu with 18.8% of the population.

85.6% of the population work in agriculture.

== See also ==
- Taplejung District
