= Surya Man Gurung =

Nepali politician

Former Minister of Labour and Employment
- In office 26 August 2016 – 31 May 2017
- President: Bidhya Devi Bhandari
- Prime Minister: Puspha Kamal Dahal
- Preceded by: Deepak Bohara
- Succeeded by: Farmulha Mansur

Personal details
- Party: Nepali Congress

Surya Man Gurung is a Nepalese politician, district president of the Nepali Congress in Taplejung District. He contested the 1999 legislative election in the Taplejung-1 constituency, but was defeated by the CPN(UML) candidate Til Kumar Menyangbo Limbu by a margin of 164 votes. Gurung is the NC candidate in the Taplejung-1 constituency for the 2008 Constituent Assembly election. He was declared a labour and employment minister by President Bidya Devi Bhandari on August 26, 2016.
