= Til Kumar Menyangbo Limbu =

Nepali politician

- तिलकुमार मेन्याङवो लिम्बु

Minister for Water Supply, Irrigation and Energy of Koshi Province
- In office 9 January 2023 – 7 July 2023
- Governor: Parshuram Khapung
- Chief Minister: Hikmat Kumar Karki
- Preceded by: Ram Kumar Rai
- Succeeded by: Pradeep Kumar Sunuwar

Minister for Health of Koshi Province
- In office 3 June 2023 – 7 July 2023
- Governor: Parshuram Khapung
- Chief Minister: Hikmat Kumar Karki
- Preceded by: Nirmala Limbu
- Succeeded by: Nirmala Limbu

Member of the Koshi Provincial Assembly
- Incumbent
- Assumed office 26 December 2022
- Preceded by: Bal Bahadur Samsohang
- Constituency: Taplejung 1(A)

Member of House of Representatives
- In office 1999–2008
- Preceded by: Mani Lama
- Succeeded by: Surya Man Gurung
- Constituency: Taplejung 1

Personal details
- Party: Communist Party of Nepal (Unified Marxist–Leninist)

Til Kumar Menyangbo Limbu (Nepali: तिलकुमार मेयाङबो लिम्बू) is a Nepalese politician, belonging to the Communist Party of Nepal (Unified Marxist-Leninist). He was elected to the Pratinidhi Sabha in the 1999 election.
