= Urmila Thebe =

Nepalese politician

Honourable Urmila Thebe
- उर्मिला थेबे

Member of Parliament, Pratinidhi Sabha for CPN (UML)
- Incumbent
- Assumed office 2022

Personal details
- Party: CPN (UML)
- Other party: CPN (UML)
- Spouse: Bhupendra Thebe
- Parents: Nayandra Raj (father); Ambika (mother)

Urmila Thebe is a Nepalese politician, belonging to the CPN (UML) Party. She is currently serving as a member of the 2nd Federal Parliament of Nepal. In the 2022 Nepalese general election she was elected as a proportional representative from the indigenous people category.
