= Mani Lama =

Nepali politician

Mani Lama is a Nepalese politician. He was elected to the Pratinidhi Sabha in the 1994 election on behalf of the Nepali Congress from the Taplejung-1 constituency. He later joined Sher Bahadur Deuba's break-away party, Nepali Congress (Democratic) in which he became a Central Committee member.

After the royal coup d'etat on February 1, 2005, Lama was appointed State Minister for Health and Population by King Gyanendra. Following his inclusion in the royal cabinet, NC(D) expelled him from their party. As a minister he accused the opposition parties of supporting terrorism.
