= Yogesh Bhattarai =

Nepali politician

Yogesh Kumar Bhattarai
- योगेश कुमार भट्टराई
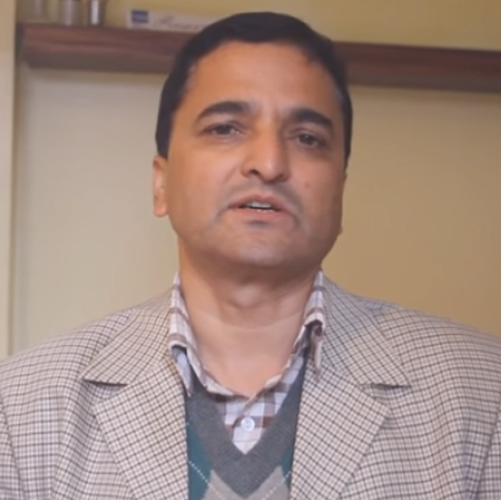
- Bhattarai in 2015

Minister of Culture, Tourism and Civil Aviation
- In office 31 July 2019 – 20 December 2020
- President: Bidhya Devi Bhandari
- Prime Minister: K.P. Oli
- Preceded by: Rabindra Prasad Adhikari
- Succeeded by: Bhanu Bhakta Dhakal

Member of the House of Representatives
- In office 4 March 2018 – 12 September 2025
- Preceded by: Bhupendra Thebe
- Succeeded by: Kshitij Thebe
- Constituency: Taplejung 1

Personal details
- Born: 6 September 1966 (age 59) Maiwakhola Gaupalika (Sangu-3), Taplejung
- Party: Communist Party of Nepal (Unified Marxist–Leninist)
- Spouse: Binda Ghimire
- Parent(s): Bhim Lal Bhattarai (father); Mahendra Devi Bhattarai (mother)

Yogesh Bhattarai (Nepali: योगेश भट्टराई) is a Nepali politician who served as a member of the House of Representatives from Taplejung constituency from 2018 to 2025. Bhattarai is currently in his second term as secretary of CPN-UML. He had previously also served as Minister of Culture, Tourism and Civil Aviation.

Bhattarai was born in 1966 in Taplejung, Nepal. He has a master's degree in Sociology and Anthropology from Tribhuvan University, Nepal. He joined the then Nepal Community Party (Unified Marxist and Leninist) as Member in 1985. Elected in 1995 as President of the All Nepal National Free Student Union (ANNFSU), he served as Secretary of CPN-UML, Head of the Publicity Department, and Member of the Party's Standing Committee from 2015 to 2018. He was elected as a Member of the Federal Parliament of Nepal and a Standing Committee Member of NCP in 2017 and 2019 respectively. He has been serving as Minister of Culture, Tourism, and Civil Aviation since 31 July 2019.

In April 2015, Bhattarai criticised the then UCPN (Maoist) chairman Pushpa Kamal Dahal, while in February 2017, he urged then Prime Minister Dahal to step down over his failure in conducting the local elections. After the merger of CPN-UML and UCPN (Maoist), he called on both KP Oli and Pushpa Kamal Dahal to retire from active politics.

== Political Life ==
He was elected as campus chairman of the Mahendra Multiple campus Free Student Union. He became president of All Nepal National Free Students Union, the student wing of CPN-UML in 1995. During the split of CPN-UML in 1998, he was part of the breakaway faction but rejoined the mother party. He became a central committee member of CPN-UML in 2009 after the eighth general convention and party secretary after the ninth general convention in 2014. He is currently secretary of Communist Party of Nepal (Unified Marxist–Leninist) .

Yogesh Bhattarai, Minister of Culture, Tourism and Civil Aviation Government of Nepal, was born in 1966 in Taplejung, Nepal. He has a master's degree in Sociology and Anthropology from Tribhuvan University, Nepal. He joined the then Nepal Community Party (Unified Marxist and Leninist) as Member in 1985. Elected in 1995 as President of the All Nepal National Free Student Union (ANNFSU), he served as Secretary of CPN UML, Head of the Publicity Department, and Member of the Party's Standing Committee from 2015 to 2018. He was elected as a Member of the Federal Parliament of Nepal and a Standing Committee Member of NCP in 2017 and 2019 respectively. He has been serving as Minister of Culture, Tourism, and Civil Aviation since 31 July 2019.

In April 2015, Bhattarai criticised the then UCPN (Maoist) chairman Pushpa Kamal Dahal, while in February 2017, he urged then Prime Minister Dahal to step down due to failure in conducting the local elections. After the merger of CPN-UML and UCPN (Maoist), he called on both KP Oli and Pushpa Kamal Dahal to retire from active politics.

== Controversy ==
=== Buddha Air flight delay incident ===
In September 2019, a video of passengers protesting inside an airplane went viral, after Yogesh Bhattarai held the scheduled passenger flight from departing at Nepalgunj Airport. Bhattarai, the then minister of culture, tourism and civil aviation arrived the airport late after attending Dolphin Festival at Tikapur, Kailali and was faced with furious passengers, dissatisfied with the abuse of power. "You are the Minister for Culture and you don't have any civility," a passenger said, as heard in the video. Subsequently, the Buddha Air flight was delayed by at least 26 minutes. The protestors were initially claiming that Bhattarai had boarded the flight nearly an hour late but the civil aviation officials at Nepalgunj airport later verified that the minister had caused the delay of only 15 minutes. The scheduled quick turn around flight of Buddha Air, on sector Kathmandu﹣Nepalgunj﹣Kathmandu, had landed at Nepalgunj Airport on 18:11 NPT, the passengers had completed the boarding by 18:45 and the flight departed on 19:06, 26 minutes after the scheduled time of 18:40. Bhattarai apologized via Twitter for the incident saying that it was not deliberate and the program he attended in Tikapur lasted longer than expected.

=== Visit Nepal 2020 ===
In January 2020, Yogesh Bhattarai faced criticism in social media for organizing Visit Nepal 2020 promotional campaign in Sydney amid 2019–20 Australian bushfire season. Nepali community expressed their dissatisfaction for the timing of the event, when Australia's own tourism body halted Kylie Minogue's Matesong ad campaign. The tourism minister was also criticized for a march rally to the Sydney Opera House which was stopped by the police, as organizers had no permission to hold such event. Bhattarai, however, wrote a Facebook status claiming that they had conducted a silent rally and the inauguration ceremony was a grand success.

In February 2020, Tourism Minister Bhattarai extended a welcoming invitation to international travelers to be part of Visit Nepal 2020 without any concern of presence of the coronavirus in Nepal. He highlighted Nepal as a COVID-free region as Nepal had no active cases by then. This caused a widespread backlash among the public, and the Visit Nepal campaign was eventually cancelled in March 2020.

== Family ==
He was born on 6 September 1966 at Sangu, Taplejung district to father Bhim Lal Bhattarai and mother Mahendra Devi Bhattarai. He is married to Binda Ghimire.

== Electoral history ==
2022 Pratinidhi Sabha Election, Taplejung

Party	Candidate	Votes	Status
CPN-UML	Yogesh Bhattarai	21,943	Elected
CPN (Maoist Centre)	Khel Prasad Budhachhetri	21,735	Lost

2017 Pratinidhi Sabha Election, Taplejung

Party	Candidate	Votes	Status
CPN-UML	Yogesh Bhattarai	29,479	Elected
Nepali Congress	Keshav Prasad Dahal	16,888	Lost

2013 Constituent Assembly Election, Kathmandu-6

Party	Candidate	Votes	Status
Nepali Congress	Bhimsen Das Pradhan	14,151	Elected
CPN-UML	Yogesh Bhattarai	12,874	Lost

2008 Constituent Assembly Election, Kathmandu-6

Party	Candidate	Votes	Status
CPN (Maoist)	Hitman Shakya	10,768	Elected
CPN-UML	Yogesh Bhattarai	9,089	Lost (3rd)
