= Taplejung District =

Taplejung སྟབས་ལས་རྫོང
- District
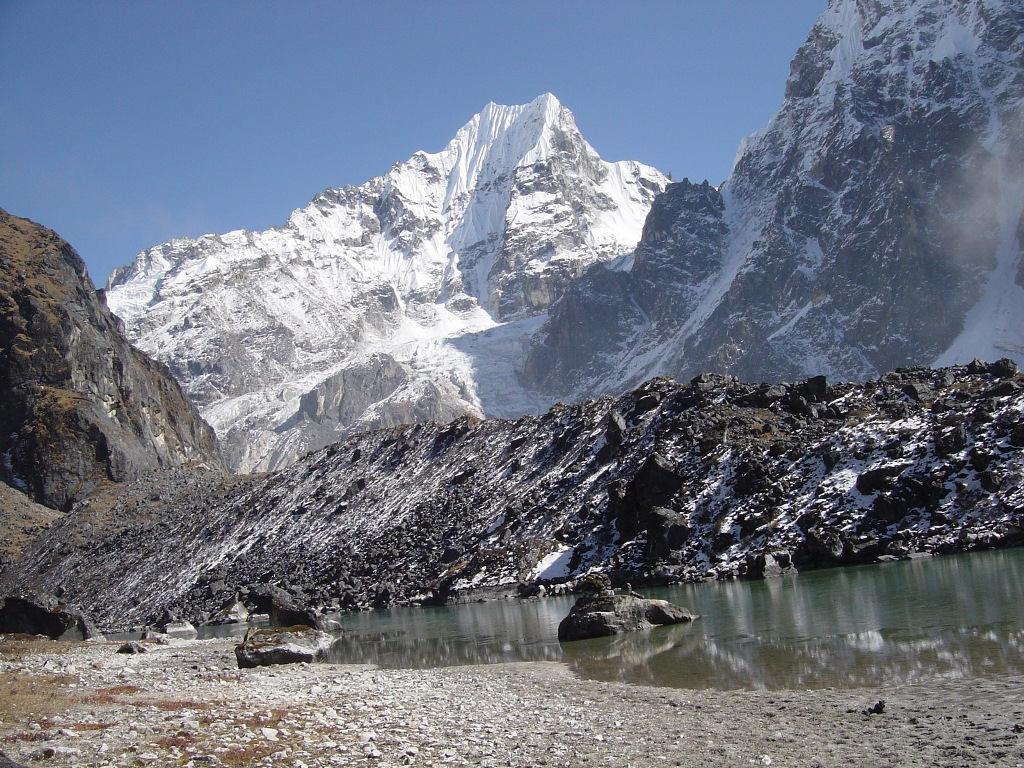
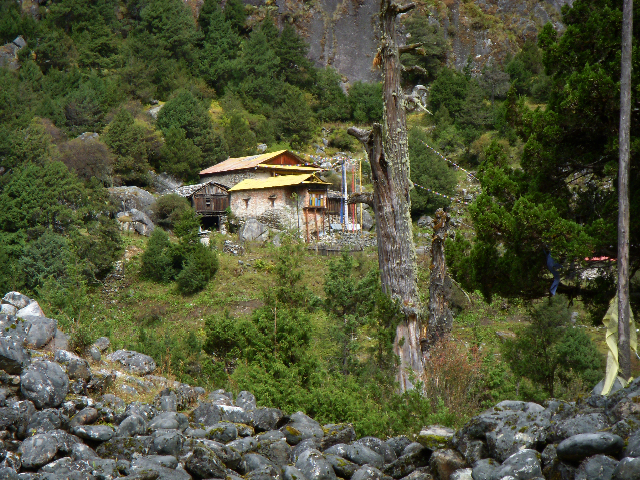
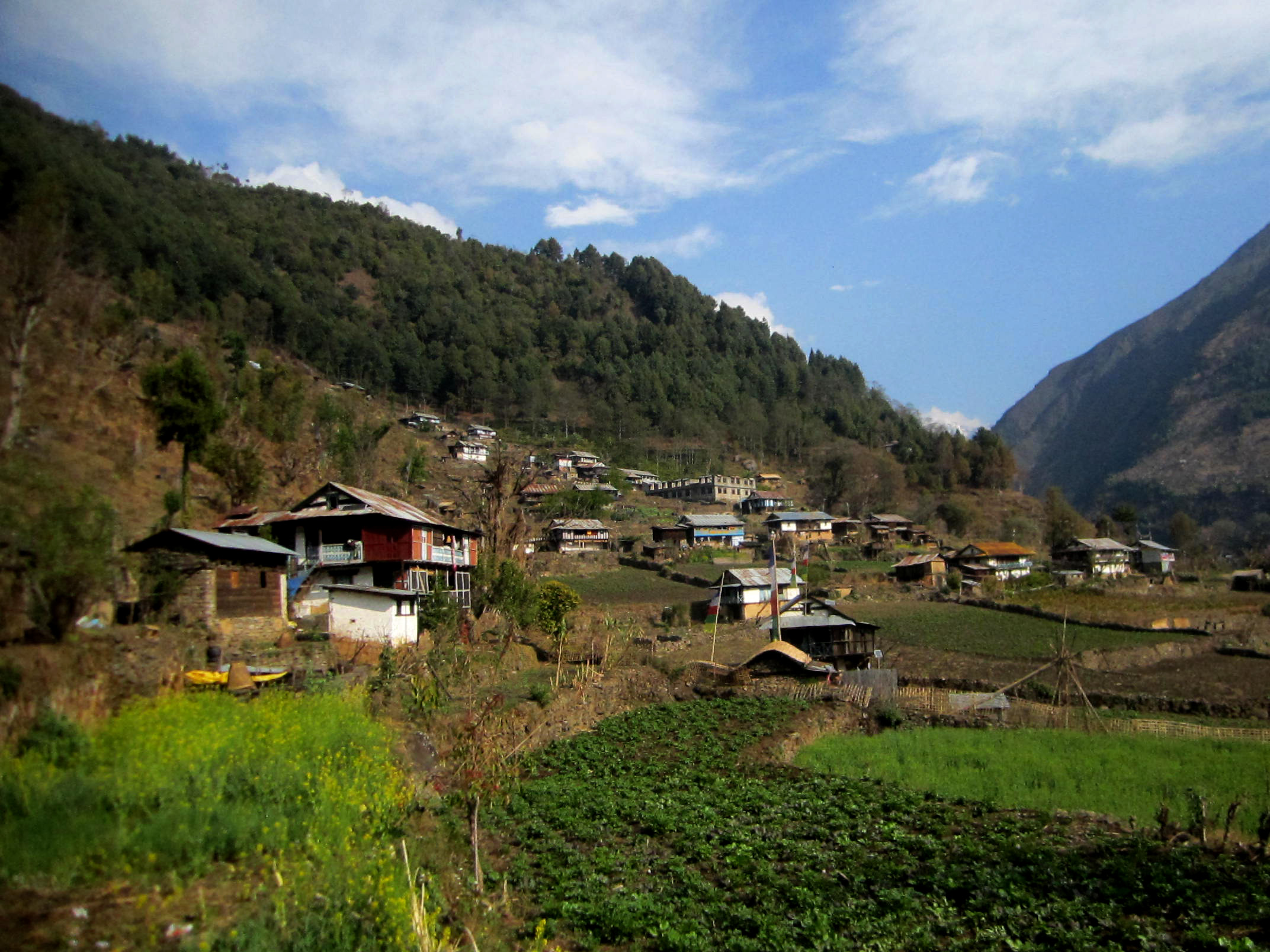
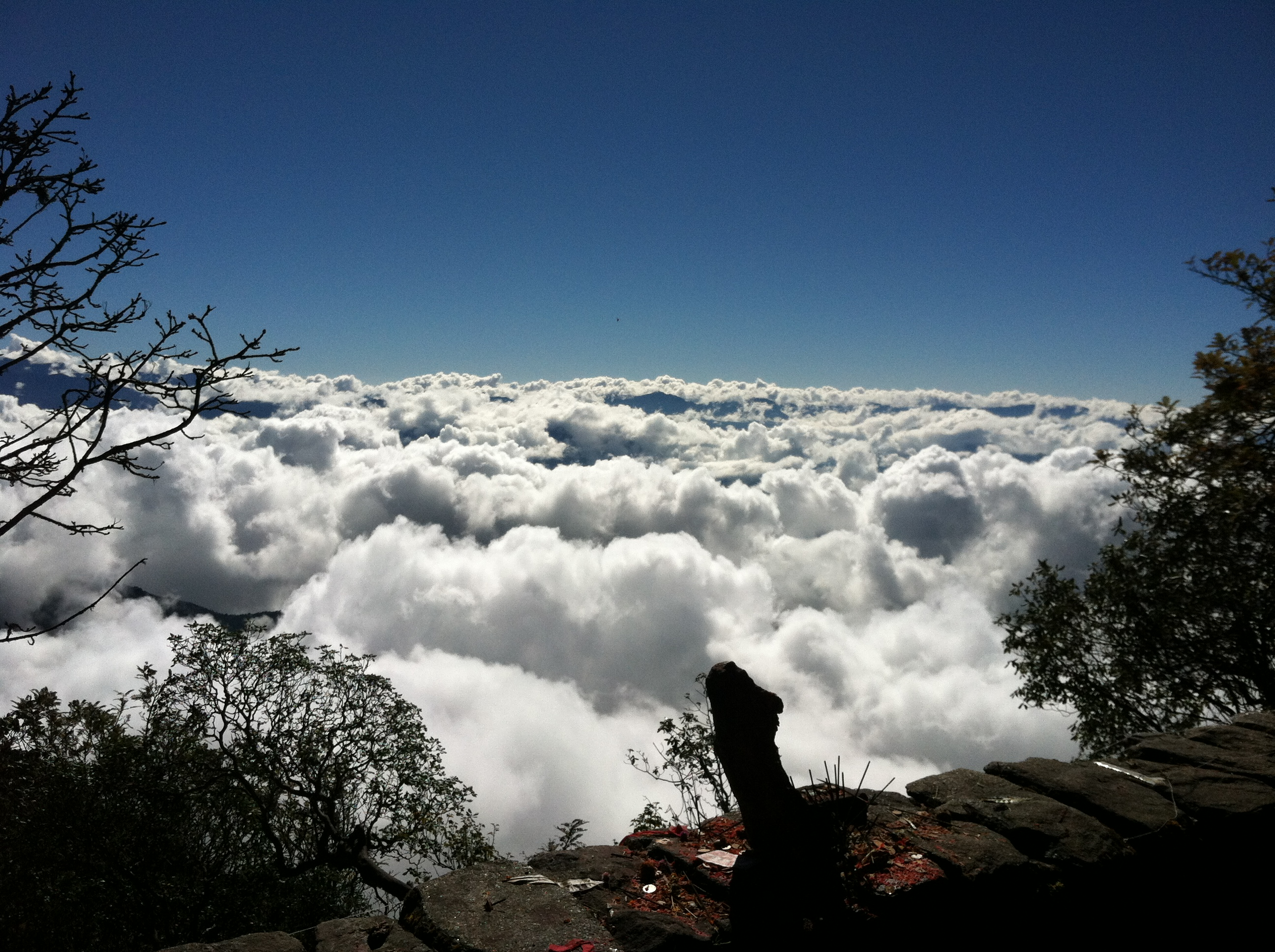
- Dudh Kunda at Yamtari Glacier, Lelep village, view from Pathibhara temple, Gunsa village (clockwise from top)

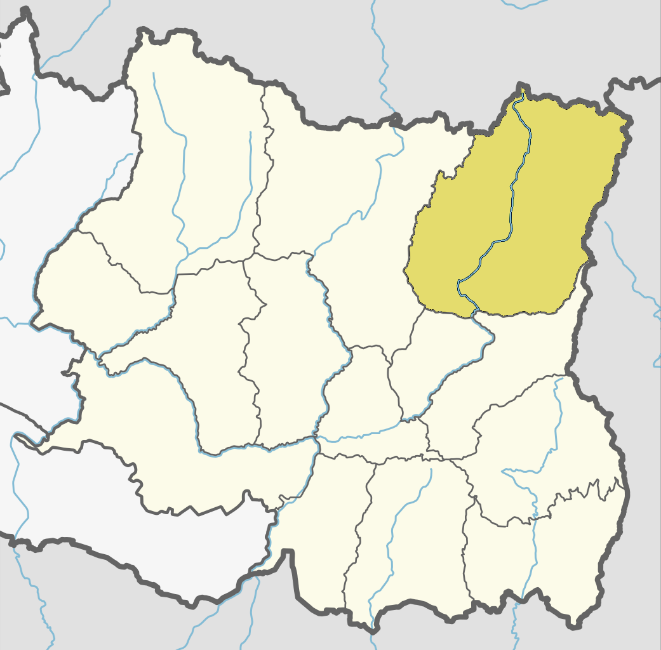
- Location of Taplejing (dark yellow) in Koshi Province
- Coordinates: 27°21′0″N 87°40′0″E
- Country: Nepal
- Province: Koshi Province
- Established: 1962
- Admin HQ.: Phungling Municipality

Government
  - Type: Coordination committee
  - Body: DCC, Taplejung
  - Head: Mr. Ghanendra Maden
  - Deputy-Head: Mrs. Debimaya Nepali

Area
  - Total: 3,645.05 km^{2} (1,407.36 sq mi)
  - Rank: 3rd
- Highest elevation: 8,586 m (28,169 ft)
- Lowest elevation: 670 m (2,200 ft)

Population (2021)
  - Total: 120,590
  - Density: 33.083/km^{2} (85.685/sq mi)
- Time zone: UTC+05:45 (NPT)
- Postal Codes: 57500
- Website: ddctaplejung.gov.np

Taplejung (Nepali: ताप्लेजुङ) Sherpa: སྟབས་ལས་རྫོང, romanized: Wylie Tap le zdong is a district in Koshi Province, located in far-eastern Nepal. It is one of the seventy-seven districts of Nepal and covers an area of 3,646 km^{2} (1,408 sq mi), making it the third-largest district in Nepal by area. According to the 2011 Nepal Census, the district has a population of 127,461. Its administrative headquarters is Phungling Municipality.

Taplejung lies deep in the Himalayas in eastern Nepal, bordering the Chinese Tibet Autonomous Region to the north across the Himalayan range, Sankhuwasabha District to the west, Tehrathum District and Panchthar District to the south, and Indian state of Sikkim to the east.

Geographically, it lies between latitudes of 27º06' to 27º55' N and longitudes of 87º57' to 88°12' E.

== Etymology ==
The origin of the name Taplejung is believed by different communities to have derived from the Sherpa/ Bhote language. According to the Sherpa (Bhote) community’s historical tradition, the name is associated with a Sherpa (Bhote) ruler known as King "Taple" (སྟབས་ལས) and the word "Dzong" (རྫོང), which means fortress, castle, or stronghold. According to this belief, the combination of these words gradually transformed through linguistic changes into the present name Taplejung

== History ==
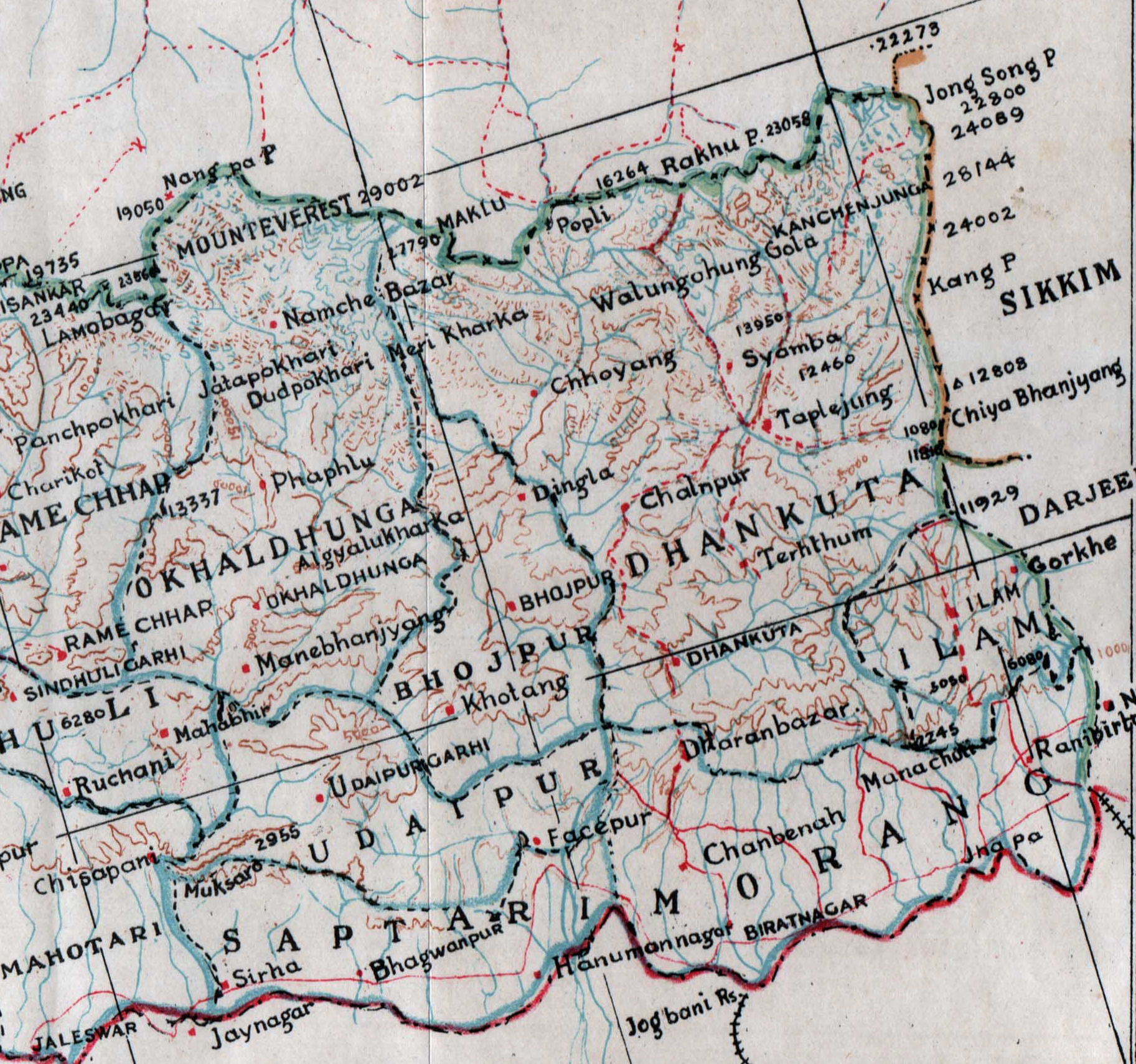
Map of Eastern Nepal in 1942 showing Taplejung, a part of large Dhankuta District

The Sherpa (Bhote) community’s historical tradition, the name is associated with a Sherpa (Bhote) ruler known as King "Taple" (སྟབས་ལས) and the word "Dzong" (རྫོང), which means fortress, castle, or stronghold. e combination of these words gradually transformed through linguistic changes into the present name Taplejung.

It is claimed that the fortress of King Taple སྟབས་ལས was located at the site of the present-day military barracks. According to some eyewitnesses and members of an excavation group, when the military barracks were established in 2024 B.S. (1967 A.D.), there was a pond/lake མཚོ at the location where the current playground exists. During the excavation of that pond, remains believed to be related to Buddhism were reportedly discovered, including prayer Beads/Dzi རིན་ཆེན་ཕྲེང་བ/གཟི and a Chorten (མཆོད་རྟེན) meaning a stupa.

Based on these oral accounts and reported findings, some members of the Sherpa (Bhote) community have continued to claim that the area was historically connected with their ancestors and Buddhist heritage.

According to Sherpa (Bhote) oral traditions, the downfall of King Taple སྟབས་ལས occurred during the territorial expansion campaign of King Prithvi Narayan Shah’s Gorkha forces. According to this account, during the expansion of the Gorkha Kingdom, a temporary agreement was made near present-day Chainpur of Sankhuwasabha District to avoid direct conflict. It is believed that weapons were secretly hidden under the pretext of burying the bodies of deceased soldiers. During the Futuk festival ཕུའུ་ཐུག, when the opposing forces were reportedly engaged in celebrations and some soldiers had consumed Chang ཆང (traditional fermented alcoholic beverage), the Gorkha soldiers are said to have taken out the hidden weapons and launched a surprise attack.

According to this oral account, around 300 Gorkha soldiers attacked a force of approximately 2,000 Tibetan and eastern Sikkimese troops, resulting in more than 1,300 deaths.

It is further believed that some surviving forces fled eastward toward Taplejung while others escaped toward Kimathangka. The surviving groups are said to have performed funeral rites for the deceased and established memorial sites in different parts of eastern Taplejung. According to local traditions, such memorial structures, including Mani walls and Buddhist monuments, can still be found up to Olangchung Gola (Walung). Following these events, some groups are believed to have surrendered to the Gorkha forces, some assimilated with the Sherpa communities, while others migrated toward Tibet and Sikkim.

After the unification of Nepal, Limbus were given more rights and given kipat (किपट) and Limbuwan is found in 9 districts. the area of Taplejung and its surrounds were called after 19th century pallo Kirat Limbuwan which means "far region".

After the unification of Nepal, the area of Taplejung became a part of the large Dhankuta District.

In 1962 when the traditional old 32 districts divided into 75, the three thums (counties) of the large Dhankuta district separately established a new district named "Taplejung".

== Geography and climate ==
Geographically Taplejung is a mountainous district where the world's third highest peak Kanchenjunga (8586 m) is located. It is situated at elevation ranging from 670 metres (2,200 ft) to 8,586 metres (28,169 ft) from sea level.

The Tamor River is a main river in the district, which flows through the middle in the district dividing district in east and west Taplejung. Gunsa river, Simbuwa river and the many tributaries of Tamur are important sources of freshwater. There are more than 60 rivers and streams in the district. Some glacial lakes are: Sinjenma Pokhari, Samdo Pokhari, Tin Pokhari, Kali Pokhari etc.

The district includes many highest peaks e.g. Gimmigela (7350 m), talung (7349 m), Kabru (7276 m), Nepal peak (7177 m), Kumbhkarna (7025 m) etc. Kanchenjunga Conservation Area is a protected area in the district which covers an area of 2,035 square kilometres (786 sq mi).

| Climate Zone | Elevation Range | % of Area |
|---|---|---|
| Upper Tropical | 300 to 1,000 meters 1,000 to 3,300 ft. | 2.4% |
| Subtropical | 1,000 to 2,000 meters 3,300 to 6,600 ft. | 14.8% |
| Temperate | 2,000 to 3,000 meters 6,400 to 9,800 ft. | 19.5% |
| Subalpine | 3,000 to 4,000 meters 9,800 to 13,100 ft. | 16.8% |
| Alpine | 4,000 to 5,000 meters 13,100 to 16,400 ft. | 38.8% |
| Nival | above 5,000 meters | 7.7% |

== Demographics ==
Historical population
| Year | Pop. | ±% p.a. |
|---|---|---|
| 1981 | 120,780 | — |
| 1991 | 120,053 | −0.06% |
| 2001 | 134,698 | +1.16% |
| 2011 | 127,461 | −0.55% |
| 2021 | 120,590 | −0.55% |

At the time of the 2021 Nepal census, Taplejung district had a population of 120,590. Taplejung has a sex ratio of 984 females per 1000 males. 28,449 (23.59%) lived in urban areas.

Languages in Taplejung District (2021)
1. Limbu (35.4%)
2. Sherpa (26.9%)
3. Nepali (23.3%)
4. Tamang (4.25%)
5. Gurung (2.48%)
6. Rai (2.18%)
7. Magar (0.92%)
8. Others (4.57%)

As their mothertongue language, 35.4% of the population spoke Limbu, 26.9% Sherpa, 23.3% Nepali, 4.25% Tamang, 2.48% Gurung, 2.18% Rai and 0.92% Magar and 4.57% others as their first language.

Ethnicity/caste wise, in 2021 35.5% were Limbu, 26.9% Sherpa, 9.7% Chhetri, 5.7% Hill Brahmin, 4.55% Rai, 4.35% Gurung, 4.30% Tamang, 3.30% Kami, 1.45% Damai, 1.39% Newar, 1.0% Magar, 0.98% Sunuwar and 0.88% Mijar.

Religion in Taplejung District (2021)
| Religion | Percent |
| Kirat Mundhum | 43.22% |
| Buddhism | 33.97% |
| Hinduism | 19.2% |
| Christianity | 2.60% |
| Bon | 0.91% |
| Others | 0.10% |

Religion: 43.22% were Kirati, 33.97% Buddhist, 19.2% Hindu, 2.60% Christian, 0.91% Bon and 0.10% others.

Literacy: 71.0% could read and write, 2.8% could only read and 26.1% could neither read nor write.

== Administration ==
Taplejung District is administered by Taplejung District Coordination Committee (Taplejung DCC). The Taplejung DCC is elected by Taplejung District Assembly. The head of Taplejung DCC is Mr. Ghanendra Maden and Mrs. Devimaya Nepali is deputy head of Taplejung DCC.

Taplejung District Administration Office under Ministry of Home Affairs co-operate with Taplejung DCC to maintain peace, order and security in the district. The officer of District Administration office called CDO and current CDO of Taplejung DAO is Dorendra Niraula.

Taplejung District Court is a judicial court to see the cases of people on district level.

| Administration | Name | Head |
|---|---|---|
| Legislative | District Coordination Committee | Ghanendra Maden |
| Executive | District Administration Office | Dorendra Niraula |
| Judicial | District Court | Prakash Raut |

== Division ==
Taplejung is divided in total 9 local level bodies, in which only Phungling is an urban municipality otherwise all other local level bodies are rural municipality.

| SN | Local level unit | Type | Population | Area | No. of wards |
|---|---|---|---|---|---|
| 1 | Phungling | urban | 26406 | 125.57 | 11 |
| 2 | Aathrai Tribeni | rural | 13784 | 88.83 | 5 |
| 3 | Sidingwa | rural | 12099 | 206 | 7 |
| 4 | Phaktanglung | rural | 12017 | 1858.51 | 7 |
| 5 | Mikkwakhola | rural | 9160 | 442.96 | 5 |
| 6 | Meringden | rural | 12548 | 210.33 | 6 |
| 7 | Maiwakhola | rural | 11037 | 138 | 6 |
| 8 | Pathibhara Yangwarak | rural | 13591 | 93.76 | 6 |
| 9 | Sirijangha | rural | 15806 | 481.09 | 8 |

=== Former administrative divisions ===
Formerly, Taplejung had one municipality and many VDCs. VDCs were the local level administrative units for villages.

Fulfilling the requirement of the new constitution of Nepal 2015, on 10 March 2017 all VDCs were nullified and formed new units after grouping VDCs.

== Constituencies ==
Taplejung District consists of 1 Parliamentary constituency and 2 Provincial constituencies

| Constituencies | Type | Area | MP/MLA | Party |
|---|---|---|---|---|
| Taplejung 1 | Parliamentary | whole Taplejung district | Yogesh Bhattarai | UML |
| Taplejung 1(A) | Provincial | Phungling, Yangwarak, Sidingba, Sirijangha and the ward no. 3 of Phaktanglung | Til Kumar Menyangbo Limbu | UML |
| Taplejung 1(B) | Provincial | Aathrai Tribeni, Maiwakhola, Meringden, Mikwakhola and Phaktanglung (excluding ward no. 3) | Khagen Singh Hangam | NC |

Taplejung constituency

== Transportation ==
Taplejung (headquarters) is connected to the rest of Nepal by the Mechi Highway which meets the east–west or Mahendra Highway at Charali (Mechinagar). The distance from Mechinagar to Taplejung is 227 kilometres (141 mi). A person can travel from Kathmandu to Taplejung by public bus, jeep or by flight. Taplejung Airport is a nearest airport.

== Tourism ==
Taplejung is a best destination for trekkers. Kanchenjunga Conservation Area comprises cultivated lands, forests, pastures, rivers, high altitude lakes and glaciers. snow leopard, Asian black bear, red panda, golden-breasted fulvetta, snow cock, blood pheasant and red-billed chough can be seen in the area. Pathibhara Devi Temple or Mukkumlung Manghim at Taplejung hill is considered as the home to Yuma Sammang, the deity of Limbu people and thus worshipped. A 16th century Diki Chhyoling monastery lies in Olangchung-gola.

== Notable people ==
- Pasang Sherpa
- Yogesh Bhattarai
- Sanduk Ruit
- Madan Bhandari
- Chhurim
- Mingma Gyabu Sherpa
- Yuba Raj Khatiwada
- Radha Krishna Mainali
- Nabin Subba
- Yangkila Sherpa
- Manoj Gajurel
- Jhuma Limbu
- Chandra Prakash Mainali
- Bharat Sitaula
- Te-ongsi Sirijunga Xin Thebe
- Sukra Raj Sonyok (Songyokpa)
- Phupu Lhamu Khatri
- Wangdi Sherpa (Bikash)
- Tamla Ukyap

== See also ==
- Sankhuwasabha District
- Solukhumbu District
- Koshi Province
- Kanchenjunga
- Jannu
