= 2023 Tanahun–1 by-election =

Nepali House of Representatives election

← 2022	23 April 2023

Constituency of Tanahun 1 in the House of Representatives
- Turnout: 53%
Candidate	Swarnim Wagle	Govinda Bhattarai	Sarbendra Khanal
Party	RSP	Congress	CPN (UML)
Popular vote	34,919	20,122	8,488
Percentage	54.57%	31.45%	13.27%
- Tanahun 1 in Gandaki Province
MP before election
Ram Chandra Poudel
Congress
Elected MP
Swarnim Wagle
RSP

The 2023 Tanahun–1 by-election was held in the Tanahun 1 constituency of Nepal on 23 April 2023. The by-election was held as the result of the vacation of the seat by the sitting member, Ram Chandra Poudel, who was elected president on 9 March 2023. It was held alongside by-elections in Chitwan 2 and Bara 2.

Rastriya Swatantra Party's Swarnim Wagle, who had left the Nepali Congress a few weeks prior to the by-election citing differences with the party leadership, won the by-election securing over 54 percent of the votes cast.

== Background ==
First elected from Tanahun 1 in 1991, Poudel switched seats in 1994 and was thereafter elected consecutively to parliament from Tanahun 2. He served as the Speaker of the Pratinidhi Sabha from 1994 to 1999, and was deputy prime minister and minister for Home Affairs from 2000 to 2002.

Having decided to switch back to Tanahun 1 in 2017, he was defeated by Krishna Kumar Shrestha of the CPN (UML). Shrestha joined the CPN (Unified Socialist) when the party was formed, and vacated the seat for Poudel in the 2022 election, himself moving to Bara 4.

Poudel was the candidate from Nepali Congress and its 10-party alliance for the 2023 presidential election, and was elected president on 9 March 2023, defeating former speaker Subas Chandra Nemwang of the CPN (UML). He resigned as member of Parliament before assuming office as president on 13 March 2023.

=== 2022 election result ===
Candidate	Party	Votes	%
Ram Chandra Poudel	Nepali Congress	25,361	40.45
Ek Bahadur Rana Magar	CPN (UML)	19,981	31.87
Govinda Raj Joshi	Independent	6,886	10.98
Bikas Sigdel	Rastriya Swatantra Party	6,044	9.64
Binod Kumar Gharti	Rastriya Prajatantra Party	2,484	3.96
Others		1,939	3.09
Total		62,695	100.00
Majority		5,380	
Nepali Congress gain			
Source: ECN

== Result ==
Candidate	Party	Votes	%	+/–
Swarnim Wagle	Rastriya Swatantra Party	34,919	54.57	+44.93
Govinda Bhattarai	Nepali Congress	20,122	31.45	−9.00
Sarbendra Khanal	CPN (UML)	8,488	13.27	−18.6
Others		456	0.71	−17.32
Total		63,985	100.00	–
Majority		14,797		
Rastriya Swatantra Party gain				
Source: ECN
