= 2024 Ilam–2 by-election =

Nepali House of Representatives by-election

← 2022	27 April 2024

Constituency of Ilam 2 in the House of Representatives
- Turnout: 60%
Candidate	Suhang Nembang	Dambar Bahadur Khadka	Dakendra Singh Limbu
Party	CPN (UML)	Congress	Independent
Popular vote	27,772	21.942	11,457
Percentage	40.56	32.05	16.73
- Ilam 2 in Koshi Province
MP before election
Subas Chandra Nembang
CPN (UML)
Elected MP
Suhang Nembang
CPN (UML)

The 2024 Ilam–2 by-election was held in the Ilam 2 constituency of Nepal on 27 April 2024. The by-election was held as the result of the death of the sitting member, Subas Chandra Nembang, chairman of the Constituent Assembly and vice–chair of the Communist Party of Nepal (UML), on 12 September 2023. It was held alongside by-election in the provincial assembly seat of Bajhang 1 (A).

CPN (UML)'s Suhang Nembang was elected in the by-election, succeeding his late father.

== Background ==
First elected to Rastriya Sabha, the upper house of the parliament of the then-Kingdom of Nepal, in 1991, Nembang served as the Minister of State for Law, Justice, Parliamentary Affairs and General Administration from 1994 to 1995 during the premiership of Man Mohan Adhikari. After the 1999 general election, he was successful in his move to the lower house, elected from Ilam 2, a seat he then represented until his death in 2023. He served as Speaker of the re-instated Pratinidhi Sabha in 2007 and was the Chairman of the Constituent Assembly from 2008 to 2015. Nembang died from a heart attack on 12 September 2023, aged 70.

=== 2022 election result ===
Candidate	Party	Votes	%
Subas Chandra Nembang	CPN (UML)	30,020	45.36
Dambar Bahadur Khadka	Nepali Congress	29,906	45.19
Prakash Sapkota	Rastriya Swatantra Party	1,380	2.09
Mani Bahadur Limbu	Mongol National Organisation	1,363	2.06
Khadga Prasad Palungwa	Rastriya Janamukti Party	1,272	1.92
Others		2,244	3.39
Total		66,185	100.00
Majority		114	
CPN (UML) hold			

== Result ==
Candidate	Party	Votes	%	+/–
Suhang Nembang	CPN (UML)	27,772	40.56	-4.8
Dambar Bahadur Khadka	Nepali Congress	21,942	32.05	-13.14
Dakendra Singh Limbu	Independent	11,457	16.73	New
Milan Limbu	Rastriya Swatantra Party	5,050	7.38	+5.29
Mani Kumar Limbu	Mongol National Organisation	816	1.19	-0.87
Others		1,435	2.10	-3.21
Total		68,472	100.00	–
Valid votes		68,472	98.70	
Invalid/blank votes		902	1.30	
Total votes		69,374	100.00	
Registered voters/turnout		115,889	59.86	
Majority		5,830		
CPN (UML) hold				
