= 2023 Nepalese presidential election =

Presidential election in Nepal

- 9 March 2023
- Registered: 881
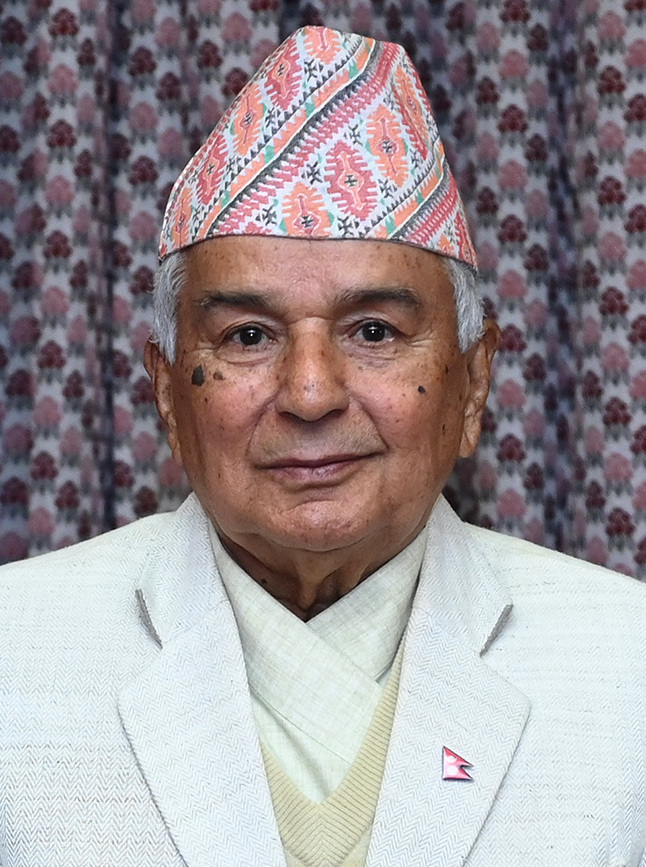

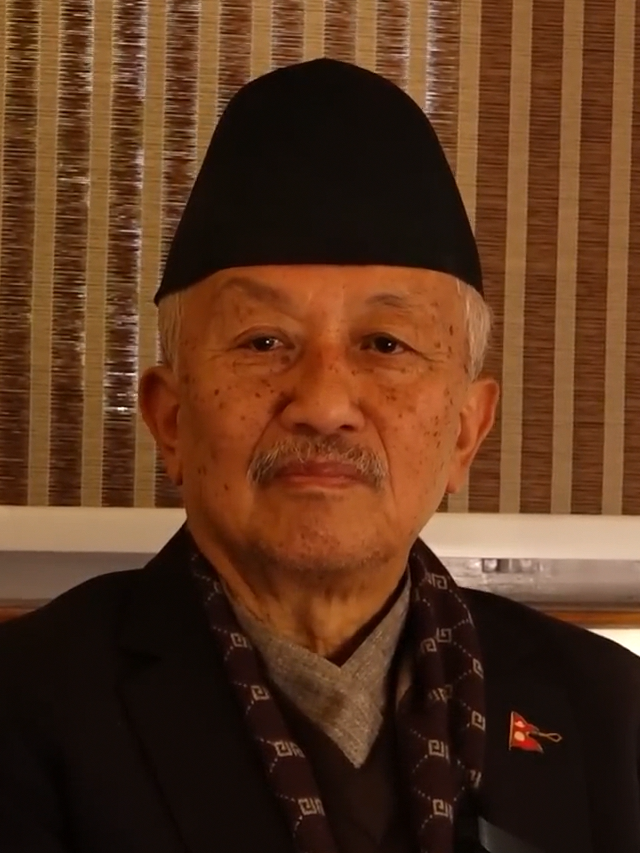
Candidate	Ram Chandra Paudel	Subas Chandra Nemwang
Party	Congress	CPN (UML)
Electoral vote	33,802	15,518
Percentage	65.54%	31.46%
President before election
Bidya Devi Bhandari
CPN (UML)
Elected President
Ram Chandra Paudel
Nepali Congress

The fourth presidential election of Nepal, to elect the country's third president since the abolition of the monarchy, was held on 9 March 2023.

The term of the incumbent president, Bidya Devi Bhandari, first elected in 2015, was set to expire on 13 March 2023. She was term-limited and could not seek re-election, with the Constitution of Nepal barring her from doing so.

== Electoral process ==
The President of Nepal is elected by the majority of the votes of all members of the electoral colleges. If no candidate is elected, a second round is held between the top two candidates of the first round, under the same majority. As the latter is of the total votes including blank and invalid ones as well as abstentions, it is possible no candidate is elected in the first and second rounds. A third may then be held with the same candidates as in the second. The candidate with the majority of valid votes is then elected president.

Part 6, Article 64 of the Constitution of Nepal 2015 sets the following qualifications for holding the presidency:

1. A person shall be eligible to be president if he/she fulfils the following qualifications:
  - He/she is eligible to be a member of the Federal Parliament.
  - He/she has attained at least 45 years of age, and
  - Is not ineligible by any law.
2. Notwithstanding anything contained in clause (1), a person who has already been elected president for two terms, shall not be eligible to be a presidential candidate for the presidential election thereafter.

== Election schedule ==
The Election Commission announced the schedule for the presidential elections on 30 January 2023.

Presidential election schedule
22 February	Publication of initial electoral roll
22 – 24 February	Claims and scrutiny on electoral roll
24 February	Publication of final electoral roll
25 February	Nomination of candidates
26 – 28 February	Scrutiny on nominations
28 February	Publication of final list of nominations
9 March	Date of election

== Electoral college ==
The electoral college is composed in 2023 of 881 members, of which 331 are from the federal parliament and 550 from the provincial assemblies, with a vote "weight" of 79 and 48 each, respectively. While the federal parliament is made of 275 members from the lower house and 59 from the upper one, 2 members of the lower house were unable to be registered in the electoral college because of a judicial affair and a third one died, thus lowering the electoral college total from the normal number of 884 to 881, and the grand total of weighted votes from 52,786 to 52,549.

=== Electoral college composition ===
Composition
Party	Pratinidhi Sabha	Rastriya Sabha	Pradesh Sabha	Total electors
Nepali Congress	88 (Note: excluding 1 suspended MP)	10	175	273
CPN (UML)	79	18	162	259
CPN (Maoist Centre)	31	16	85	132
CPN (Unified Socialist)	10	8	25	43
Rastriya Prajatantra Party	14	0	28	42
People's Socialist Party	11	3	23	37
Janamat Party	6	0	16	22
Rastriya Swatantra Party	19	0	0	19
Loktantrik Samajwadi Party	4	1	12	17
Nagarik Unmukti Party	4	0	12	16
Nepal Majdoor Kisan Party	1	0	3	4
Rastriya Janamorcha	1	1	1	3
Nepal Socialist Party	1	0	2	3
Hamro Nepali Party	0	0	2	2
Independent	3	2	4	9
Total	272 (Note: excluding 2 vacant seats and 1 suspended MP)	59	550	881

=== Electoral college vote value composition ===
Party	Pratinidhi Sabha	Rastriya Sabha	Pradesh Sabha	Total votes	Percentage
Nepali Congress	6,952	790	8,400	16,142	30.72
CPN (UML)	6,241	1,422	7,776	15,439	29.38
CPN (Maoist Centre)	2,449	1,264	4,080	7,793	14.83
CPN (Unified Socialist)	790	632	1,200	2,622	4.99
Rastriya Prajatantra Party	1,106	0	1,344	2,450	4.66
People's Socialist Party	869	237	1,104	2,210	4.21
Rastriya Swatantra Party	1501	0	0	1,501	2.86
Janamat Party	474	0	768	1,242	2.36
Loktantrik Samajwadi Party	316	79	576	971	1.85
Nagarik Unmukti Party	316	0	576	892	1.70
Nepal Majdoor Kisan Party	79	0	144	223	0.42
Rastriya Janamorcha	79	79	48	206	0.39
Nepal Socialist Party	79	0	96	175	0.33
Hamro Nepali Party	0	0	96	96	0.18
Independent	237	158	192	587	1.12
Total	21,488	4,661	26,400	52,549	100

== Candidates ==
On 24 February 2023, Ram Chandra Paudel of the Nepali Congress was chosen as the common candidate of an alliance of eight political parties; Congress, CPN (Maoist Centre), CPN (Unified Socialist), PSPN, Janamat, LSPN, NUP and RJM. The next day, the CPN (UML) announced that it would field party vice-chair Subas Chandra Nemwang as its presidential candidate.

=== Nepali Congress ===
Candidate	Born	Positions held	Province	Announced	Ref
Ram Chandra Paudel	15 October 1944 (aged 78); Tanahun, Gandaki	Speaker of the House of Representatives (1994–1999); Deputy Prime Minister and Minister of Home Affairs (2000–2002); Member of the House of Representatives from Tanahun (1991–1999; 2022–present); Member of the Legislature Parliament of Nepal (2015–2017); Member of the Constituent Assembly of Nepal from Tanahun 2 (2008–2015)	Gandaki	25 February 2023	

=== Communist Party of Nepal (Unified Marxist–Leninist) ===
Candidate	Born	Positions held	Province	Announced	Ref
Subas Chandra Nemwang	11 March 1954 (aged 68); Ilam, Koshi	Chairman of the Constituent Assembly of Nepal (2008–2015); Speaker of the Interim Legislature of Nepal (2006–2008); State Minister for Law, Justice & Parliamentary Affairs (1994–1995); Member of the House of Representatives from Ilam 2 (1999–2002; 2006–2008; 2017–present); Member of the Legislature Parliament of Nepal (2015–2017); Member of the Constituent Assembly of Nepal (2008–2015); Member of the National Assembly (1991–1993; 1995–1999)	Koshi	25 February 2023	

== Results ==
Results
Candidate	Party	Votes			Total votes	%
Candidate	Party	Federal	Provincial	Total	Total votes	%
Ram Chandra Paudel	NC	214	352	566	33,802	68.54
Subas Chandra Nemwang	CPN (UML)	98	162	260	15,518	31.46
Valid votes		312	514	826	49,320	99.40
Blank and invalid votes		1	4	5	271	0.60
Total		313	518	831	49,591	100
Electors / turnout		331	550	881	52,549	94.32

== See also ==
- 2023 Nepalese vice presidential election
