= Nembang =

Nembang is a surname. Notable people with the surname include:

- Subas Chandra Nembang
- Suhang Nembang
- Alok Nembang
- Pankaj Bikram Nembang
- Dharmendra Bikram Nembang
- Til Bikram Nembang
