= Phuyal =

Phuyal (फुयाल) Khas surname found among the Bahun (Brahmin) communities of Nepal and the Indian states of Sikkim and West Bengal. Notable people with the surname include

- Hari Prasad Phuyal, current Justice of the Supreme Court of Nepal.
- Rameshwor Phuyal, Nepalese politician and former member of the Constituent Assembly of Nepal.
- B B Phuyal, Nepalese film director and producer.
