= Mahesh Basnet =

Mahesh Basnet may refer to

- Mahesh Basnet (Nepalese politician, born 1960), incumbent member of parliament for Ilam 1
- Mahesh Basnet (Nepalese politician, born 1975), former minister of industry of Nepal.
