= Gopal Gurung =

Nepalese politician

- गोपाल गुरुङ
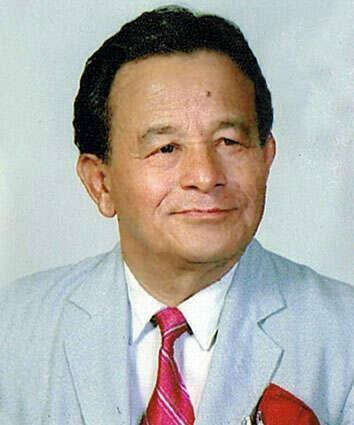

Founder President of the Mongol National Organisation
- In office 1989–2016
- Succeeded by: Budda Lal Meche

Personal details
- Born: 7 December 1939 Darjeeling
- Died: 10 June 2016 Alka Hospital, Lalitpur, Nepal
- Education: M.A. Political science PhD
- Alma mater: Ambedkar University Delhi
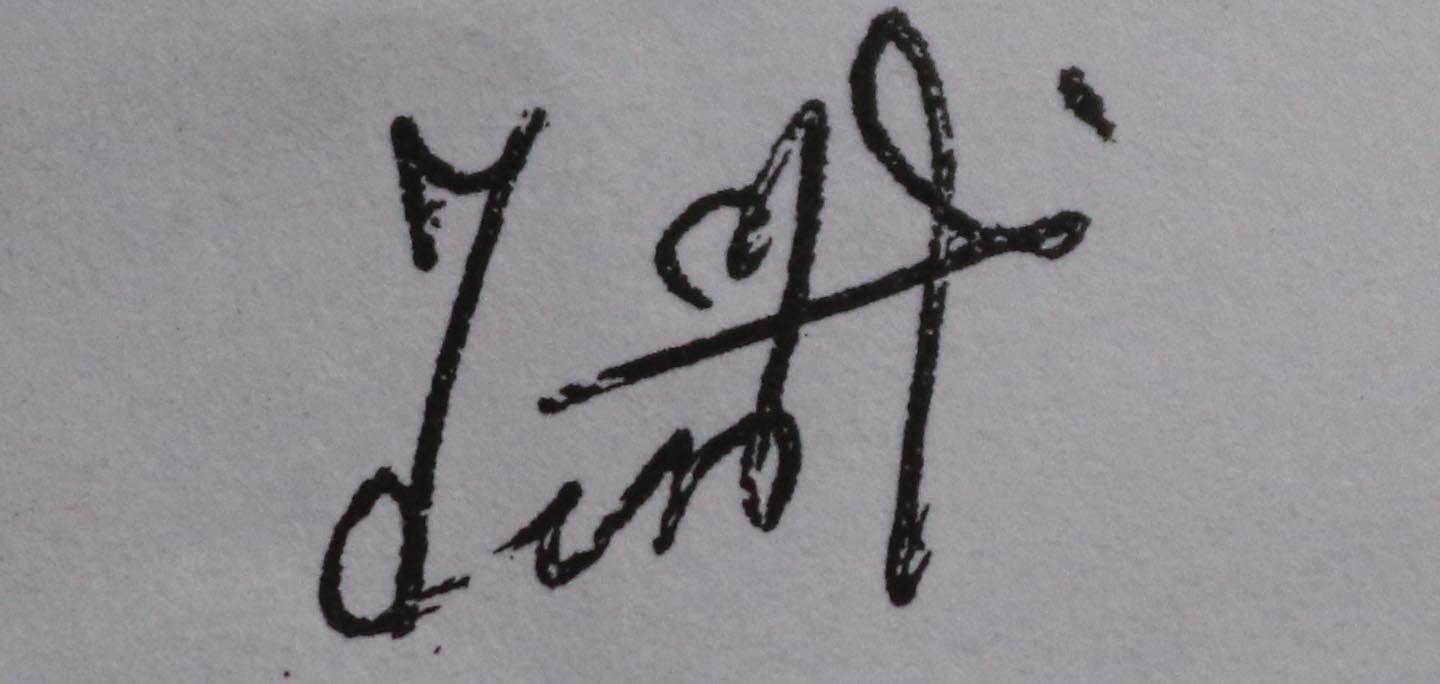
- Signature

Gopal Gurung (Nepali: गोपाल गुरुङ; 7 December 1939 – 10 June 2016) was a politician, author, journalist, teacher and vocal advocate of the human rights for the indigenous people of Nepal. Gurung was the editor-in-chief of New Light and Thunderbolt weekly newspapers for many years. He was a former member of the Central Committee of the Nepal Journalists Association, former secretary general of the World Nepalese Association and Chairman of the All India Press Council for Nepal, as well as a consultant and coordinator for the Press Foundation of Asia (PFA), Manila, Philippines.

Gurung was one of the first writers to discuss ethnic discrimination. He began writing about it in 1972 in the Nepali Newspaper New Light and later published an influential book on the topic, Hidden Facts in Nepalese Politics. Gurung, founding president of the Mongol National Organisation, was a pioneer democratic republican figure of Nepal. Even during the Panchayat era, Gurung, a self-described anti-current figure, had stood in favour of federal republic. The then government had jailed Gurung for Hidden Facts in Nepalese Politics. Though banned in Nepal, the book became quite popular in Sikkim and Darjeeling. Gopal Gurung, the author of this book, was arrested by the Panchayat government on 30 August 1988 (just after the publication of the second edition in 1988), based on the charge of racial discrimination against the Hindu rulers and politicians. He was arrested under the two State Offence Acts at the time, and was sent to the Bhadragol central jail for three years without any adequate charge sheet. In the jail there was no separate cell for the political prisoners and he had to share the room with other criminals. On 1 January 1989, he established his political organization Mongol National Organisation along with its own flag and manifesto. During his stay in jail he was not sound in health, and any prolonged confinement in the unhealthy atmosphere at the jail would have badly deteriorated his physical condition. But luckily after the abrogation of the Panchayat system, a multiparty system came into existence and people became free from the bondage of the autocratic Panchayat government. Consequently, Gurung and many other political prisoners were released unconditionally. Gurung was released on 13 April 1990.

== Early life ==
Gurung was born to politician Tej Bahadur Gurung and Kumari Gurung, on 7 December 1939, in Mahanadi, Darjeeling. Gurung's involvement in politics came out of his childhood exposure to political activities, and his experiences as a teacher, writer and journalist. He first encountered politics through his father, Tej Bahadur Gurung, who became politically active upon retiring from the British Army, like many ex-servicemen. Gurung came to Nepal and began teaching in 1952 in Ilam district, at the age of 17. There were few schools in Nepal at that time, and he founded a small elementary school, holding classes in an old goat pen. Later, he served as assistant headmaster and headmaster of two schools in Jhapa district and, in 1964, he taught school for one year in the British army camp in the town of Dharan. He began publishing and serving as the editor-in-chief of a Nepali language newspaper, called New Light, from Kathmandu in 1967.

=== Education ===
The villagers of Darjeeling had completed their primary education from Pathshala Mahanadi and secondary level education from Pushparani Roy Mem H S School, Darjeeling. After the Second World War, when his father left the military service and got involved in politics, the other siblings of the family also became upset. My father started a small living job, which was also snatched away on the charge of being a communist. After that, father entered Nepal to overthrow the Rana regime. Gurung had only heard that his grandfather Kulman Gurung lived in Ranitar in Panchthar district of eastern Nepal. Therefore, it was his dream to see the Motherland. Gurung entered Nepal in 2008 to fulfil his dream of setting foot in Motherland. He came to Ilam, in the far east of Nepal, to spread the light of education. He started teaching in Kolbung by setting up a school. Gurung, who started his journey in Nepal in this way, went to the remote areas of Jhapa's Gauriganj, Dharan Depot, Kathmandu and West Parbat Rakhu and became involved in the teaching profession for some time. Struggling in this way, Gurung, who matriculated from West Bengal Board of Secondary Education in 2016, also learned Bengali. Gurung, who has since become fluent in Nepali, Hindi, English and Bengali, also received military training. Gurung, who could not study comfortably, had to struggle to get an education. He came from Tribhuvan University in 2024 BS and completed his studies up to B.A. from Saraswati Multiple Campus. After hard work and some financial resources, he passed the private examination in Political Science from Tribhuvan University and completed his formal studies up to a master's degree.

== Arrest ==
Gurung has been a vocal advocate of the human rights for the indigenous people of Nepal. He was an editor and author of many books, the most popular and controversial being The Hidden facts of Nepalese Politics. He was arrested and jailed without any conviction or trial by the Panchayat government in 1989 for being threatened by what he wrote in that book. The status quo in the Hindu dominated establishment tried all it could to stop Gurung from speaking against the institutionalized racism, corruption and exploitation by the rulers and politicians against the indigenous people who are primarily Buddhist. But they discovered that it was too late, and that the genie was already out of the box. The news of his arrest spread beyond Nepal's border and brought protests and demands of his immediate release.

=== International support ===
When Gurung fell ill after his imprisonment, the Panchayati (Mandalay) had to fight hard as the government did not take him to the hospital on time. During his stay in jail he received much support from journalists, writers and other well wishers not only from his homeland but also from abroad. PEN and Amnesty International London, Amnesty International Denmark, Press Foundation of Asia Manila, Philippines, All India Journalist Council, India and many others had corresponded on the government level for his early release along with their human rights efforts. A chain of letters poured in from the well wishers of Nepal, India, Indonesia, Norway, France and Denmark. A host of people of Buddhist and Christian religions prayed for his sound health and early release. Mochtar Lubis wrote threatening letters to the prime minister, including the ghost court, and demanded his release by publishing a photo in Denmark's Human Rights Bulletin AKTION, after which teachers in some schools in Denmark continued to inform students about Gurung. In prison life, students, including the mayor and people from various professions, wrote letters of Empathy. A weekly newspaper from Sikkim published a photo of Gurung with Nelson Mandela a South African politician and Taslima Nasreen a Bangladeshi writer, while a German writer from Germany wrote in German. At that time, three pen falcons of the world were suffering at the risk of their lives. They included Salman Rushdie who wrote Satanic Verses and had to live underground life for many years. Coincidentally, he was released due to multi-party system. Before the arrest of Gurung, the Sikkim Observer had written that "Nepali Writer Likely to be arrested". Later on 21 December 1996, the Sikkim Observer also wrote; 'Why is Gurung not as innocent as The Sons of God?'. Similarly, another English language newspaper from Sikkim, Himalayan Guardian wrote, on 23 April 1997, 'Asserting identity is not being communal: Nepal should be a secular country.' The following excerpts are just a few drops of a pond. It shows how the present world responded on humanistic grounds towards the good cause of a freedom fighter. They knew Gurung's struggle was not a communal one, and their support was for universally approved human rights, democracy and freedom.

=== Underground after the publication of the second book ===
Gurung had to go underground for five years after the publication of In Quest of Mongol Entity and Doctorate (PhD) on MNO in 2058 BS. The book protested against the monarchy and the Hindu nation. The then-king Gyanendra Shah declared a federal democratic republic, a secular country and urged to become president for life. Due to this book, Gurung's own sister, Krishna Gurung, was detained for one month by torturing her mentally and physically.

== Mongol National Organisation ==
Gurung established the Mongol National Organization (MNO) in Bhadragol Jail. The MNO, established on 1 January 1989, was not registered by the Election Commission in 1990. After the commission refused to register, the case was fought for six years. Gurung himself advocated. The Supreme Court dismissed the case. MNO has not been registered for 18 years. Despite success in the local elections of 1992 and 1997, there was no success in the parliamentary elections of 1991, 1994 and 1999. Gurung, who had fought free elections, became the victim of a conspiracy at the state level to defeat him. Girija Prasad Koirala fixed the price of Gurung's head at 10 crores, but Gurung did not bow his head. At the risk of his life, he continued to fulfill his purpose. Nepal was declared a secular and federal democratic republic. In 2008, after 18 years, it was registered by the Mongol National Organization. In the first Constituent Assembly election, 11,578 proportional votes were cast. In the second Constituent Assembly election of 2014, 8,215 were brought.

== Political change in Sikkim ==
Gurung seems to have played a role in the political transformation of Sikkim after 1992. Later Pawan Kumar Chamling came to power in Sikkim after the fall of Bhandary; and Bhandary had disclosed his reaction. He said, "Chamling is only an acting Chief Minister, who is controlled by Gopal Gurung. Therefore, Chamling may not last even for six months." And Pawan Chamling declared himself in his open speech in Namchi on 19 September 1992, "When I was expelled From the party, Bhandary accused me of my affiliation to the MNO, guided by Gopal Gurung from Kathmandu." Chamling got hold of the book Hidden Facts in Nepalese Politics and waving it in His hand to the public, he had said, "Bhandari accused me that, this is the guide book of Chamling, who is trying to establish a greater Mongolian kingdom with the help of Subash Ghising of Darjeeling." Gurung used to say in the latter part of his life that the betrayal he got by helping Pawan Chamling was a big lesson for him. In Sikkim, until a few years ago, politics was run in the name of Gurung. Gurung had helped Pawan Kumar Chamling, who had been the chief minister of Sikkim for a long time. Gurung used to say in the latter part of his life that the betrayal he got by helping Pawan Chamling was a big lesson for him. In Sikkim, until a few years ago, politics was run in the name of Gurung. The Chamling era has come to an end with the allegations against Pawan Chamling and Prem Singh Tamang.

== Controversial agenda raised by Gurung ==
Although claiming that the history of Nepal is not true, some of the agendas raised by Gurung during the Panchayat period have been addressed but some of them have become controversial. Gurung, who has fought all his life for a federal democratic republic of Nepal and a secular state, argued that a state should not be formed on the basis of caste. He was of the view that the state should be restructured on the basis of rivers, canals, hills and mountain geography. Apart from these agendas, Gurung's agenda has been taken positively by many leaders. They demanded that the national flag of Nepal, the national animal musk deer should be kept and the statues of kings and queens should be kept in the museum. He started boycotting Dashain saying that it was the day of the downfall of the indigenous Mongols. Opposing the term "Adibasi Janajati", Gurung was of the opinion that the word Mulbasi Mongols should be used, although followers have been raising the issue.

== Bibliography ==
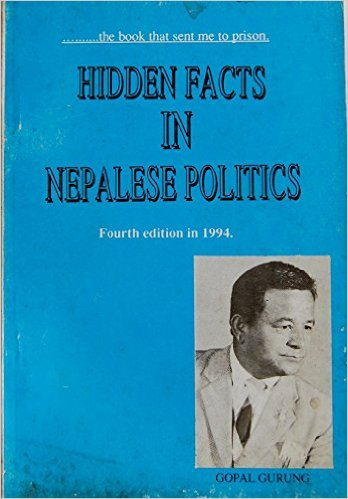
Based on Gopal Gurung and his book

Gurung's writings have appeared in numerous newspapers and magazines both at home and abroad. His published books are as follows^{[23]}:

=== Collections ===
- Shesh-kavita (poems): published in 1962
- Shesh-yatra (novel) published in 1965
- Shesh-pran (stories) published in 1965
- Shesh-prashna (stories) published in 1965

=== Other unpublished books ===
- Bhul-Jindagiko (novel), (mistake of life)
- Poems of Jail (poem collection)
- An experience of jail life (Personal life story)
- Buddha in My Vision

=== Books on politics ===
Nepali Rajniti ma Adhekhai Sachai (Hidden facts in Nepalese Politics) was the book that sent him to the prison.

- Nepali Rajnitima Adhekha Sachai (Hidden Facts in Nepalese Politics) Nepali edition published in Nepali 1985, 1988, 1993 and English edition in 1994.
- Newly Created Untouchable Janjaati (nomad, gypsy) Society in Nepalese and Sikkimese Politics, published thrice in 1998 and its English edition in 1999.
- In Quest of Mongol Entity, and Doctorate (PhD) on MNO, Nepali edition published in March 2001. English edition in July 2001.
- Mongolism-Bahunism-Maoism in Nepalese Politics, published in Nepali 2006. Also prepared in English.

== Awards ==
In 1986, he won the Mitsubishi Award for Japan and was selected for the title of 'Japan's Open Relationship with Other Asian Countries.'

== Death ==
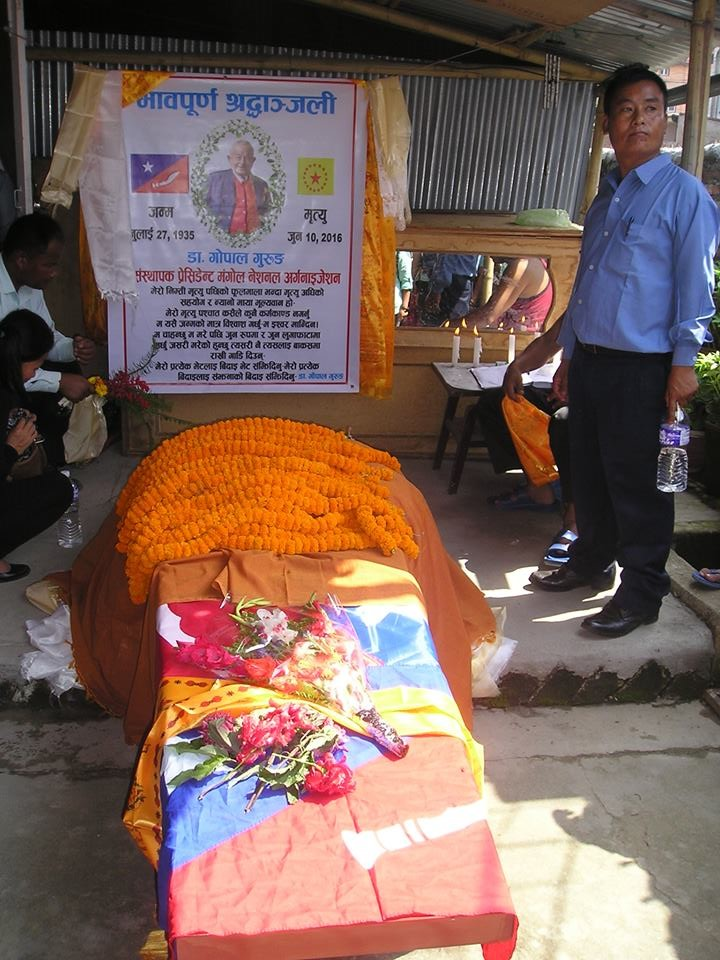

Gurung died on 10 June 2016, while undergoing treatment after being diagnosed with sudden blood cancer, in Alka hospital. Gurung had fought as a secularist all his life, so he was buried without any religious rites. The funeral was held in the premises of the Mongol Research Center building at Bahundangi in Jhapa in the presence of thousands of supporters. Gurung's wish was to be buried in the same way as he died without any rituals.
