= Ilam 1 =

Parliamentary constituency in Province No. 1, Nepal

- Parliamentary constituency
- Ilam 1 in Koshi Province
- Province: Koshi Province
- District: Ilam District

Current constituency
- Created: 1991
- Party: Nepali Congress
- Member of Parliament: Nishkal Rai
- Koshi MPA 1(A): Khinu Langwa Limbu (US)
- Koshi MPA 1(B): Shamsher Rai (NC)

Ilam 1 is one of two parliamentary constituencies of Ilam District in Nepal. This constituency came into existence on the Constituency Delimitation Commission (CDC) report submitted on 31 August 2017.

== Incorporated areas ==
Ilam 1 incorporates Sandakpur Rural Municipality, Maijogmai Rural Municipality, Rong Rural Municipality, Suryodaya Municipality, wards 10, 13 and 14 of Ilam Municipality and wards 1–5, 9 and, 10 of Mai Municipality.

== Assembly segments ==
It encompasses the following Koshi Provincial Assembly segment

- Ilam 1(A)
- Ilam 1(B)

== Members of Parliament ==
=== Parliament/Constituent Assembly ===
Election	Member	Party
1991	Jhala Nath Khanal	CPN (UML)
1999	Benup Raj Prasai	Congress
2008	Jhala Nath Khanal	CPN (UML)
May 2018	Jhala Nath Khanal	NCP
March 2021	Jhala Nath Khanal	CPN (UML)
August 2021	Jhala Nath Khanal	Unified Socialist
2022	Mahesh Basnet	CPN (UML)
2026	Nishkal Rai	Congress

=== Provincial Assembly ===
==== 1(A) ====
Election	Member	Party
2017	Khinu Langwa (Limbu)	CPN (UML)
May 2018	Khinu Langwa (Limbu)	NCP
March 2021	Khinu Langwa (Limbu)	CPN (UML)
August 2021	Khinu Langwa (Limbu)	Unified Socialist

==== 1(B) ====
Election	Member	Party
2017	Kaji Man Kagate	CPN (UML)
May 2018	Kaji Man Kagate	NCP
March 2021	Kaji Man Kagate	CPN (UML)

== Election results ==
=== Election in the 2020s ===
==== 2026 general election ====
Candidate	Party	Votes	%
Nishkal Rai	Nepali Congress	14,543	24.49
Vinod Nemwang Limbu	Shram Sanskriti Party	13,632	22.95
Kajiman Kagate	Communist Party of Nepal (Unified Marxist–Leninist)	11,966	20.15
Bimal Gadaal	Rastriya Swatantra Party	9,160	15.42
Rana Bahadur Rai	Nepali Communist Party	7,665	12.91
Buddha Lal Meche	Mongol National Organisation	801	1.35
Jwala Nepal Dahal	Rastriya Prajatantra Party	577	0.97
Others		1,047	1.76
Total		59,391	100.00
Majority		911	
Nepali Congress gain			

==== 2022 general election ====
Candidate	Party	Votes	%
Mahesh Basnet	CPN (UML)	25,753	45.17
Jhala Nath Khanal	CPN (Unified Socialist)	23,089	40.49
Budhha Lal Meche	Mongol National Organisation	2,442	4.28
Toyanath Sharma Sapkota	Rastriya Prajatantra Party	1,599	2.80
Kamal Kumar Rai	People's Socialist Party, Nepal	1,313	2.30
Bikram Pandey	Independent	1,184	2.08
Others		1,638	2.87
Total		57,018	100.00
Majority		2,664	
CPN (UML) gain			

==== 2022 provincial election ====
===== 1(A) =====
Candidate	Party	Votes	%
Khinu Langwa Limbu	CPN (Unified Socialist)	13,371	46.04
Shobha Prajuli	CPN (UML)	11,395	39.24
Amuma Dev Makrehang	Mongol National Organisation	1,467	5.05
Krishna Kattel	Rastriya Prajatantra Party	1,311	4.51
Lila Bahadur Sunuwar	People's Socialist Party	888	3.06
Others	608	2.09	
Total		29,040	100.00
Majority		1,976	
CPN (Unified Socialist)			

===== 1(B) =====
Candidate	Party	Votes	%
Shamsher Rai	Nepali Congress	12,780	45.04
Dipak Kumar Thebe	CPN (UML)	12,142	42.79
Prem Kumar Tamang	Mongol National Organisation	1,356	4.78
Rajendra Kumar Lamichhane	Rastriya Prajatantra Party	1,281	4.51
Others	817	2.88	
Total		28,376	100.00
Majority		638	
Nepali Congress			

=== Election in the 2010s ===
==== 2017 legislative elections ====
Party	Candidate	Votes
CPN (Unified Marxist–Leninist)	Jhala Nath Khanal	36,805
Nepali Congress	Bhupendra Kattel	19,638
Federal Socialist Forum, Nepal	Subas Rai	2,059
Mongol National Organisation	Surya Kumar Gurung	1,710
Others		1,902
Invalid votes		2,365
Result	CPN (UML) hold	
Source: Election Commission

==== 2017 Nepalese provincial elections ====
===== 1(A) =====
Party	Candidate	Votes
CPN (Unified Marxist–Leninist)	Khinu Langwa (Limbu)	18,686
Nepali Congress	Devendra Kumar Rai	9,327
Federal Socialist Forum, Nepal	Lasang Tamang	1,148
Mongol National Organisation	Amumam Raj Matrehang	1,136
Others		1,395
Invalid votes		1,003
Result	CPN (UML) gain	
Source: Election Commission

===== 1(B) =====
Party	Candidate	Votes
CPN (Unified Marxist–Leninist)	Kaji Man Kagate	17,986
Nepali Congress	Durga Kumar Baral	10,021
Others		2,635
Invalid votes		1,064
Result	CPN (UML) gain	
Source: Election Commission

==== 2013 Constituent Assembly election ====
Party	Candidate	Votes
CPN (Unified Marxist–Leninist)	Jhala Nath Khanal	17,342
Nepali Congress	Himalaya Karmacharya	15,527
Federal Socialist Party, Nepal	Devendra Kumar Rai	4,529
UCPN (Maoist)	Yuba Kumar Paudel	4,420
Others		2,423
Result	CPN (UML) hold	
Source: NepalNews

=== Election in the 2000s ===
==== 2008 Constituent Assembly election ====
Party	Candidate	Votes
CPN (Unified Marxist–Leninist)	Jhala Nath Khanal	17,655
Nepali Congress	Benup Raj Prasai	13,774
CPN (Maoist)	Surya Prakash Bala	10,917
Rastriya Prajatantra Party	Lila Devi Shrestha	2,167
Others		2,040
Invalid votes		2,086
Result	CPN (UML) gain	
Source: Election Commission

=== Election in the 1990s ===
==== 1999 legislative elections ====
Party	Candidate	Votes
Nepali Congress	Benup Raj Prasai	18,608
CPN (Unified Marxist–Leninist)	Jhala Nath Khanal	18,502
Rastriya Prajatantra Party	Ganesh Rasik Rai	1,919
Others		1,715
Invalid Votes		758
Result	Congress gain	
Source: Election Commission

==== 1994 legislative elections ====
Party	Candidate	Votes
CPN (Unified Marxist–Leninist)	Jhala Nath Khanal	14,383
Nepali Congress	Toya Nath Bhattarai	14,173
Independent	Gopal Gurung	1,611
Rastriya Prajatantra Party	Chandra Kant Bhat Rai	1,428
Rastriya Janamukti Party	Chanra Bahadur Thulung	1,030
Others		508
Result	CPN (UML) hold	
Source: Election Commission

==== 1991 legislative elections ====
Party	Candidate	Votes
CPN (Unified Marxist–Leninist)	Jhala Nath Khanal	25,540
Nepali Congress	Toya Nath Bhattarai	19,270
Result	CPN (UML) gain	

== See also ==
- List of parliamentary constituencies of Nepal
