= Nishkal Rai =

Nepalese politician (born 1991)

The Honourable Nishkal Rai

Member of Parliament, House of Representatives
- Incumbent
- Assumed office March 26, 2026
- Preceded by: Mahesh Basnet
- Constituency: Ilam 1

Whip for Nepali Congress, 7th House of Representatives
- Incumbent
- Assumed office April 27, 2026

Personal details
- Born: February 19, 1991 (age 35) Shree Antu, Suryodaya, Ilam District, Nepal
- Party: Nepali Congress
- Parent: Tej Bahadur Rai (father)

Nishkal Rai (Nepali: निश्कल राई) also spelled as Nishcal Rai is a Nepalese politician who is serving as a member of parliament and a whip from the Nepali Congress. He was elected to the House of Representatives from the Ilam 1 parliamentary constituency in the 2026 General Election.

== Personal life and education ==
Rai was born on February 19, 1991, into a Rai family in Shree Antu, Suryodaya, Ilam District, Nepal. He was born to Tej Bahadur Rai. He completed his bachelor's degree in business management from Shanker Dev Campus. He is currently pursuing a master's degree in M. Phil..

== Politics ==
He joined the Nepal Student Union during college days at Shanker Dev Campus. He also served as regional secretary and president of the Nepali Congress, Ilam.

On January 19, 2026, the Nepali Congress parliamentary committee decided that he would contest the general election as a congress party candidate from Ilam 1. He won the election by securing 14,543 votes and defeated Vinod Nemwang Limbu of Shram Sanskriti Party and Kajiman Kagate of CPN (UML). He is now a member of the state affairs and good governance parliamentary committee for the Nepali Congress in the Pratinidhi Sabha since April 2026.

== Electoral performance ==
Election	Year	Constituency	Contested for	Political party	Result	Votes	% of votes
Nepal general election	2026	Ilam 1	Pratinidhi Sabha member	Nepali Congress	Won	14,543	24.49%
