= Tanahun 1 =

Parliamentary constituency in Nepal

- Parliamentary constituency for the House of Representatives
- Tanahun 1 in Gandaki Province

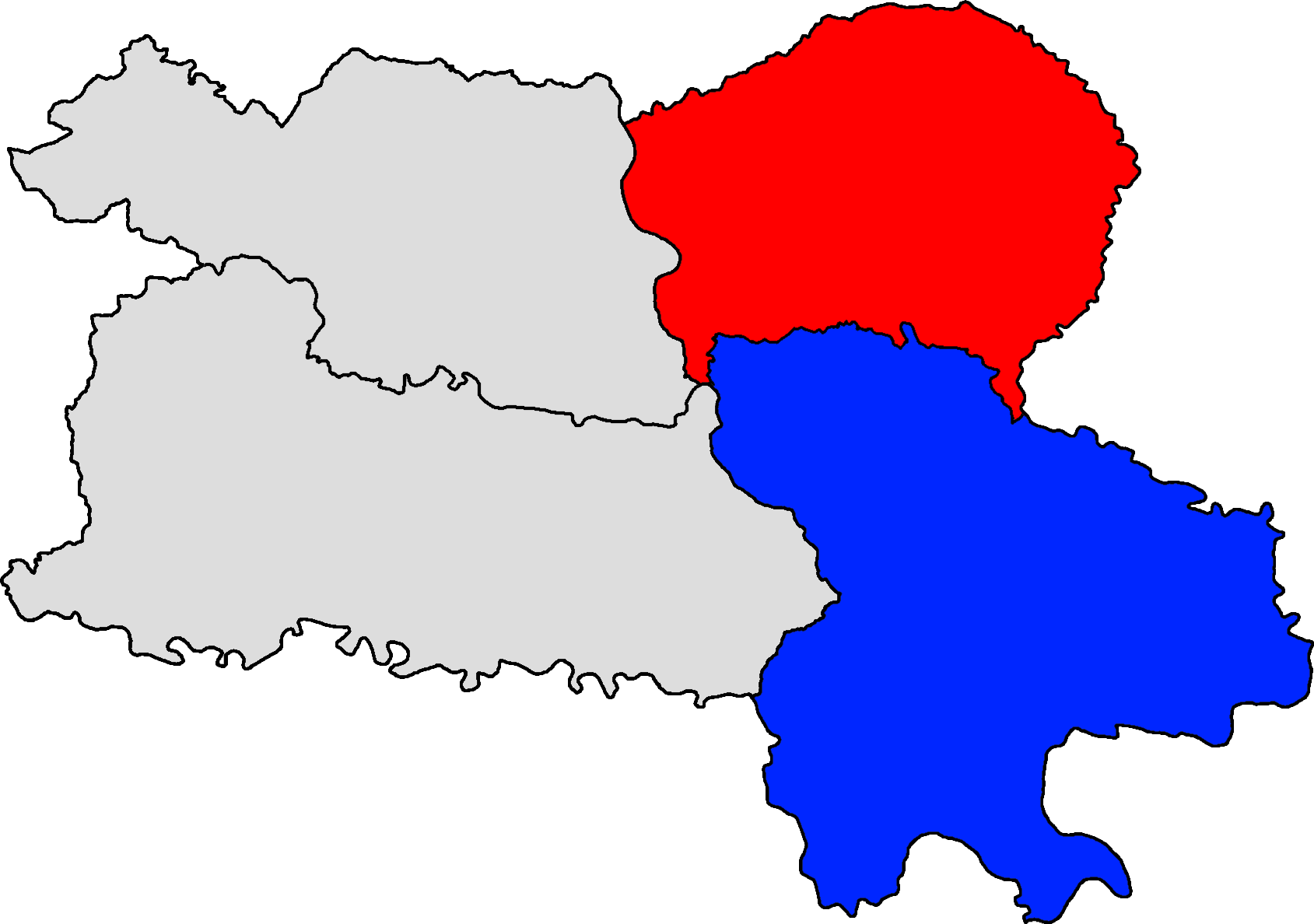
- Assembly segments Tahaun 1(A) and Tanahun 1(B) within Tanahun District
- Province: Gandaki Province
- District: Tanahun District
- Electorate: 126,882

Current constituency
- Created: 1991
- Party: Rastriya Swatantra Party
- MP: Swarnim Wagle
- Gandaki MPA 1(A): Ashok Kumar Shrestha(NC)
- Gandaki MPA 1(B): Hari Bahadur Chuman (Nepali Communist Party)

Tanahun 1 is one of two parliamentary constituencies of Tanahun District in Nepal. This constituency came into existence on the Constituency Delimitation Commission (CDC) report submitted on 31 August 2017.

== Incorporated areas ==
Tanahun 1 incorporates Devghat Rural Municipality, Anbukhaireni Rural Municipality, Bandipur Rural Municipality, Bhanu Municipality and, wards 1–4 and 7–11 of Byas Municipality.

== Assembly segments ==
It encompasses the following Gandaki Provincial Assembly segment

- Tanahun 1(A)
- Tanahun 1(B)

== Members of Parliament ==
=== Parliament/Constituent Assembly ===
Election	Member	Party
1991	Ram Chandra Paudel	Nepali Congress
1994	Govinda Raj Joshi	Nepali Congress
2008	Suresh Kumar Ale Magar	CPN (Maoist)
January 2009	Suresh Kumar Ale Magar	UCPN (Maoist)
2013	Shankar Bhandari	Nepali Congress
2017	Krishna Kumar Shrestha	CPN (Unified Marxist–Leninist)
May 2018	Krishna Kumar Shrestha	Nepal Communist Party
March 2021	Krishna Kumar Shrestha	CPN (Unified Marxist–Leninist)
August 2021	Krishna Kumar Shrestha	CPN (Unified Socialist)
2022	Ram Chandra Paudel	Nepali Congress
2023^	Swarnim Wagle	Rastriya Swatantra Party
2026	Swarnim Wagle	Rastriya Swatantra Party

- ^ by-election

=== Provincial Assembly ===
==== 1(A) ====
Election	Member	Party
2017	Ram Bahadur Gurung	CPN (Unified Marxist-Leninist)
May 2018	Ram Bahadur Gurung	Nepal Communist Party
2022	Ashok Kumar Shrestha	Nepali Congress

==== 1(B) ====
Election	Member	Party
2017	Hari Bahadur Chuman	CPN (Maoist Centre)
May 2018	Hari Bahadur Chuman	Nepal Communist Party
2022	Hari Bahadur Chuman	CPN (Maoist Centre)
Nov 2025	Hari Bahadur Chuman	Nepali Communist Party

== Election results ==
=== Election in the 2020s ===
==== 2026 general election ====
Candidate	Party	Votes	%	+/–
Swarnim Wagle	Rastriya Swatantra Party	38,040	58.15	▲3.70
Gobinda Bhattarai	Nepali Congress	16,231	24.81	▼6.56
Bhagawati Neupane	CPN (UML)	5,830	8.91	▼4.32
Bidha Nath Dhakal	Nepali Communist Party	2,393	3.66	New entry
Kashiram Gurung	Shram Sanskriti Party	967	1.48	New entry
Ramdatta Joshi	Rastriya Prajatantra Party	826	1.26	New entry
Manjil Rana	Ujyaalo Nepal Party	508	0.78	▲0.92
Others		624	0.95	
Total		65,419	100.00	–
Valid votes		65,419	94.89	
Invalid/blank votes		3,522	5.11	
Total votes		68,941	100.00	
Registered voters/turnout		126,882	54.33	
Majority		21,809		
Rastriya Swatantra Party hold				

==== 2023 by-election ====
Candidate	Party	Votes	%
Swarnim Wagle	Rastriya Swatantra Party	34,919	54.45
Gobinda Bhattarai	Nepali Congress	20,122	31.37
Sarbendra Khanal	CPN (UML)	8,488	13.23
Others		606	0.94
Total		64,135	100.00
Majority		14,797	
Rastriya Swatantra Party gain			
Source: Election Commission of Nepal

==== 2022 general election ====
Candidate	Party	Votes	%
Ram Chandra Paudel	Nepali Congress	25,361	40.45
Ek Bahadur Rana Magar	CPN (UML)	19,981	31.87
Govinda Raj Joshi	Independent	6,886	10.98
Bikas Sigdel	Rastriya Swatantra Party	6,044	9.64
Binod Kumar Gharti	Rastriya Prajatantra Party	2,484	3.96
Others		1,939	3.09
Total		62,695	100.00
Majority		5,380	
Nepali Congress gain			

==== 2022 provincial election ====
===== 1(A) =====
Candidate	Party	Votes	%
Ashok Kumar Shrestha	Nepali Congress	15,392	44.58
Ram Bahadur Gurung	CPN (UML)	11,172	32.36
Bibek Neupane	Rastriya Prajatantra Party	3,627	10.50
Bidyanath Dhakal	CPN (Unified Socialist)	2,013	5.83
Others	2,325	6.73	
Total		34,529	100.00
Majority		4,220	
Nepali Congress			

===== 1(B) =====
Candidate	Party	Votes	%
Hari Bahadur Chuman	CPN (Maoist Centre)	13,283	45.85
Purna Bahadur Gurung	CPN (UML)	10,519	36.31
Raju Gotame	Rastriya Prajatantra Party	3,396	11.72
Others	1,775	6.13	
Total		28,973	100.00
Majority		2,764	
CPN (Maoist Centre)			

=== Election in the 2010s ===
==== 2017 legislative elections ====
Party	Candidate	Votes
CPN (Unified Marxist–Leninist)	Krishna Kumar Shrestha	34,492
Nepali Congress	Ram Chandra Paudel	27,690
CPN (Marxist–Leninist)	Man Bahadur Thapa	1,231
Others		918
Invalid votes		3,472
Result	CPN (UML) gain	
Source: Election Commission

==== 2017 Nepalese provincial elections ====
===== 1(A) =====
Party	Candidate	Votes
CPN (Unified Marxist–Leninist)	Ram Bahadur Gurung	18,265
Nepali Congress	Gobinda Bhattarai	16,878
Others		1,150
Invalid votes		1,207
Result	CPN (UML) gain	
Source: Election Commission

===== 1(B) =====
Party	Candidate	Votes
CPN (Maoist Centre)	Hari Bahadur Chuman	15,360
Nepali Congress	Raghu Nath Paudel	11,881
Others		1,783
Invalid votes		1,240
Result	Maoist Centre gain	
Source: Election Commission

==== 2013 Constituent Assembly election ====
Party	Candidate	Votes
Nepali Congress	Shankar Bhandari	15,713
CPN (Unified Marxist–Leninist)	Ram Bahadur Gurung	11,018
UCPN (Maoist)	Sita Pokharel	6,480
Others		1,924
Result	Congress gain	
Source: NepalNews

=== Election in the 2000s ===
==== 2008 Constituent Assembly election ====
Party	Candidate	Votes
CPN (Maoist)	Suresh Kumar Ale Magar	17,744
CPN (Unified Marxist–Leninist)	Ek Bahadur Rana Magar	10,566
Nepali Congress	Govinda Raj Joshi	10,477
Rastriya Prajatantra Party	Amar Singh Guru	1,094
Others		2,635
Invalid votes		2,407
Result	Maoist gain	
Source: Election Commission

=== Election in the 1990s ===
==== 1999 legislative elections ====
Party	Candidate	Votes
Nepali Congress	Govinda Raj Joshi	23,205
CPN (Unified Marxist–Leninist)	Ek Bahadur Rana Magar	15,908
Rastriya Janamukti Party	Ganesh Bahadur Gurung	1,891
CPN (Marxist–Leninist)	Babu Krishna Pandey	1,436
Others		965
Invalid Votes		669
Result	Congress hold	
Source: Election Commission

==== 1994 legislative elections ====
Party	Candidate	Votes
Nepali Congress	Govinda Raj Joshi	19,086
CPN (Unified Marxist–Leninist)	Ek Bahadur Rana Magar	11,322
Rastriya Prajatantra Party	Chhetra Pratap Adhikari	6,147
Others		1,526
Result	Congress hold	
Source: Election Commission

==== 1991 legislative elections ====
Party	Candidate	Votes
Nepali Congress	Ram Chandra Paudel	18,268
Samyukta Jana Morcha Nepal	Ram Nath Sharma "Aakhil"	13,859
Result	Congress gain	

== See also ==
- List of parliamentary constituencies of Nepal
