= Khinu Langwa Limbu =

Nepalese politician

Honourable Khinu Langwa Limbu
- खिनु लङ्वा लिम्बू

Minister for Tourism and Culture of Koshi Province
- In office 6 February 2022 – 9 January 2023
- Governor: Parshuram Khapung
- Chief Minister: Rajendra Kumar Rai
- Preceded by: Constituency established
- Succeeded by: Constituency disestablished

Member of Koshi Provincial Assembly
- Incumbent
- Assumed office 5 February 2018
- Preceded by: Constituency established
- Constituency: Ilam 1(A)

Personal details
- Born: Ilam, Nepal
- Party: CPN (Unified Socialist)

Khinu Langwa Limbu (Nepali: खिनु लङ्वा लिम्बू) is a Nepalese politician belonging to CPN (Unified Socialist). She had served as the Minister for Tourism and Culture in the Government of Koshi Province.

Limbu is also serving as member of Koshi Provincial Assembly. and was elected from Ilam 1 (A) constituency.

== Electoral history ==
=== 2017 Nepalese provincial elections ===
Ilam 1(A)
Party	Candidate	Votes
CPN (Unified Marxist–Leninist)	Khinu Langwa Limbu	18,686
Nepali Congress	Devendra Kumar Rau	9,327
Federal Socialist Forum, Nepal	Lasang Tamang	1,148
Others		2,531
Invalid votes		1,003
Result	CPN (UML) gain	
Source: Election Commission

== See also ==
- CPN (Unified Socialist)
- Jhala Nath Khanal
