= Swarnim Wagle =

Nepalese Minister of Finance since 2026

- स्वर्णिम वाग्ले

Minister of Finance
- Incumbent
- Assumed office 27 March 2026
- President: Ram Chandra Paudel
- Prime Minister: Balendra Shah
- Preceded by: Rameshwor Prasad Khanal

Vice Chairperson of the Rastriya Swatantra Party
- Incumbent
- Assumed office 29 November 2023 Serving with Sobita Gautam
- President: Rabi Lamichhane
- Preceded by: Position created

Member of Parliament, Pratinidhi Sabha
- Incumbent
- Assumed office 26 March 2026
- Preceded by: Himself
- Constituency: Tanahun 1
- In office 28 April 2023 – 9 September 2026
- Preceded by: Ram Chandra Paudel
- Succeeded by: Parliament dissolved
- Constituency: Tanahun 1

Personal details
- Born: 16 February 1974 (age 52) Sahid Lakhan, Gorkha District, Nepal
- Party: Rastriya Swatantra (2023–present)
- Other political affiliations: Nepali Congress (before 2023)
- Education: Budhanilkantha School; London School of Economics (BEc); Harvard University (MPA/ID); Australian National University (PhD)
- Occupation: Politician, Economist
- Website: swarnimwagle.com.np

Dr. Swarnim Wagle (Note: Nepali: डा. स्वर्णिम वाग्ले) (born 16 February 1974) is a Nepalese politician and prominent South Asian economist who has served as the Minister of Finance since 2026. He is also the vice-chairperson of the Rastriya Swatantra Party. He was formerly a chief economic advisor at the UNDP Regional Bureau for Asia and the Pacific (RBAP) in New York.

Wagle has been a member of the Nepalese federal parliament since April 2023, initially having been elected in a by-election from the seat of Tanahun 1, vacated after the incumbent was elected president of Nepal, and later being re-elected in the 2026 general election.

== Political history ==
=== Nepali Congress ===
Wagle was associated with the Nepali Congress for several decades. Coming from a family background aligned with the party's liberal democratic ideology, he contributed to the formulation of the party's economic policies and was one of the members involved in drafting its election manifesto. Wagle's intellectual and ideological orientation has long reflected liberal democratic values promoted by the Nepali Congress. He has also been a vocal supporter of the Millennium Challenge Corporation (MCC) Nepal Compact, emphasizing its importance in Nepal's long-term infrastructure and energy connectivity.

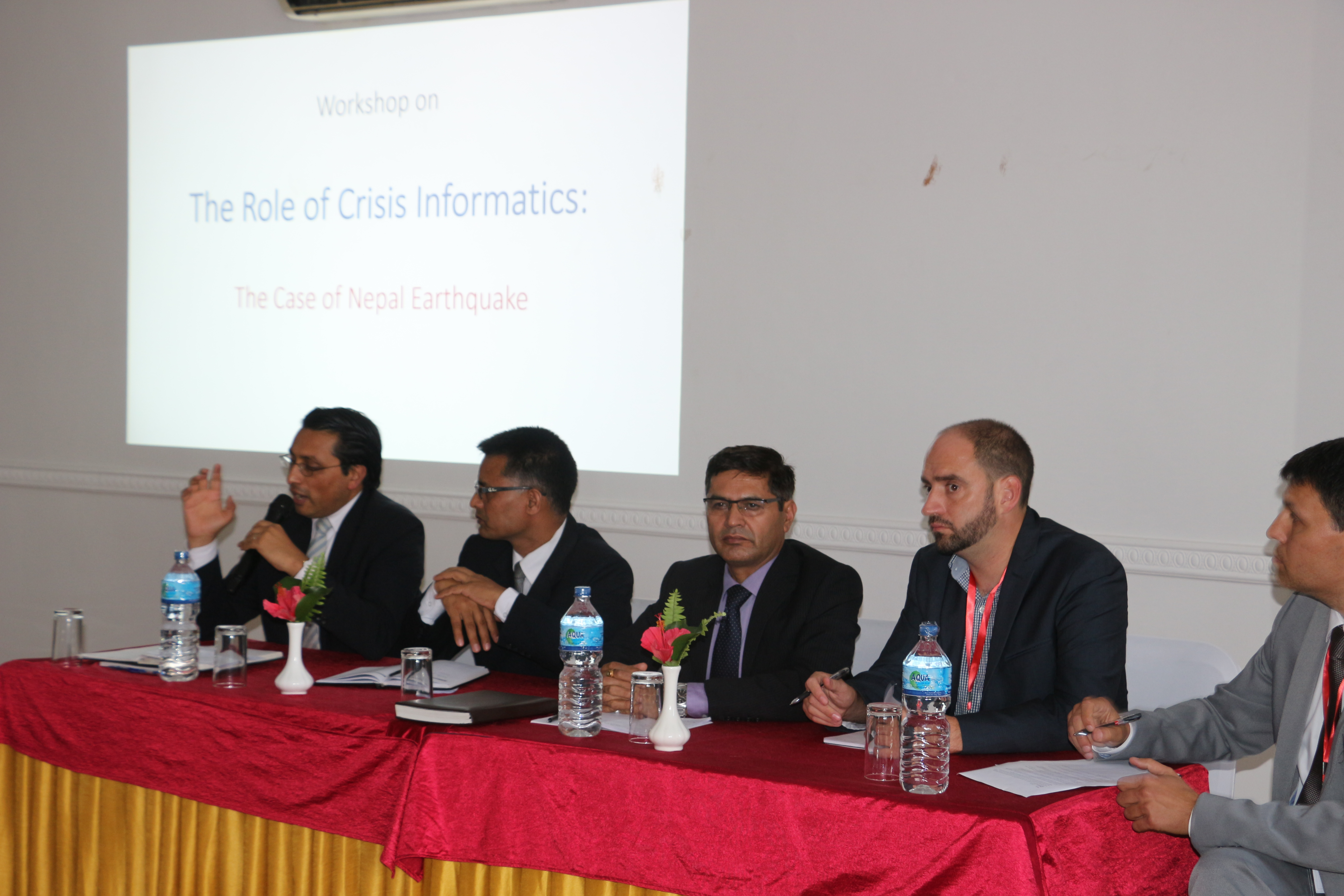
Hon. Dr. Swarnim Wagle (Member of the National Planning Commission) at the panel

During his tenure with the party, Wagle was recommended by the Nepali Congress for appointment to the National Planning Commission (NPC). He was appointed to the commission during the premiership of Sher Bahadur Deuba, and later served as vice-chair of the commission from August 2017 to February 2018. He was also a member of the commission for two terms, from May 2014 to November 2015, and September 2016 to August 2017.

He played a key policy role in reconstruction efforts following the 2015 Nepal earthquakes that claimed about 9000 lives. Between 2020 and 2022, during the COVID-19 pandemic, he was the chief economic advisor at the United Nations Development Programme Regional Bureau for Asia and the Pacific in New York, covering 36 countries.

During the 2022 general elections, senior leader Gagan Thapa had reportedly lobbied for Wagle's candidacy from Chitwan, though the effort was unsuccessful. Later, after the Rastriya Swatantra Party (RSP) offered him a ticket for the Tanahun–1 by-election, he left the Nepali Congress to contest under the RSP banner.

=== Rastriya Swatantra Party ===
In March 2023, Wagle formally joined the Rastriya Swatantra Party (RSP) and was nominated as its candidate for the Tanahun–1 by-election. Wagle secured a landslide victory, defeating the Nepali Congress candidate by a margin of nearly 15,000 votes, and receiving 55 percent of the total votes cast.

Following his victory, Wagle quickly rose within the party's leadership ranks. In November 2023, he was elevated to the position of vice-chair of the Rastriya Swatantra Party.

In early 2024, during the party's central meeting in Jaleshwar, Wagle was entrusted with leading the formulation of the party's long-term economic and development policy framework. His role centered on shaping evidence-based policy positions to strengthen the RSP's ideological and governance agenda.

However, reports later surfaced of internal differences between Wagle and party general secretary Mukul Dhakal over organizational management and strategic priorities. The disagreement, though short-lived, attracted media attention as it reflected emerging debates within the RSP over leadership roles and policy direction.

In June 2026, Wagle was re-elected as Vice Chairperson of the Rastriya Swatantra Party at the party's first general convention held in Chitwan. Bipin Kumar Acharya was elected General Secretary, while Sobita Gautam was elected Vice Chairperson alongside Wagle.

=== Electoral history ===
==== 2023 Tanahun–1 by-election ====
Candidate	Party	Votes	%
Swarnim Wagle	Rastriya Swatantra Party	34,919	54.57
Govinda Bhattarai	Nepali Congress	20,122	31.45
Sarbendra Khanal	CPN (UML)	8,488	13.27
Others		456	0.71
Total		63,985	100.00
Majority		14,797	
Rastriya Swatantra Party gain			
Source: ECN

==== 2026 Tanahun–1 election ====
Candidate	Party	Votes	%
Swarnim Wagle	Rastriya Swatantra Party	38,040	60.87
Govinda Bhattarai	Nepali Congress	16,231	25.97
Bhagwati Neupane	CPN (UML)	5,830	9.33
Others		2,393	3.83
Total		62,494	100.00
Registered voters/turnout		126,882	–
Majority		21,809	
Rastriya Swatantra Party hold			
Source: ECN

== Professional career and education ==
In October 2019, Wagle was appointed chair of the Institute for Integrated Development Studies (IIDS), a South Asian policy think tank established in Kathmandu in 1979. Outside Nepal, he has worked as an economic policy specialist in international organizations like United Nations Development Program and the World Bank intermittently between 1997 and 2022.

As chief economic advisor of the UNDP Asia-Pacific (2020–2022), he co-edited The Great Upheaval, published by Cambridge University Press, and led high-profile policy advisory missions to crisis-hit countries like Sri Lanka.

He holds high academic degrees from the London School of Economics, Harvard University and the Australian National University.
