= Ilam 2 =

Parliamentary constituency in Province No. 1, Nepal

- Parliamentary constituency
- Ilam 2 in Koshi Province
- Province: Koshi Province
- District: Ilam District

Current constituency
- Created: 1991
- Party: CPN (UML)
- Member of Parliament: Suhang Nembang
- Member of the Provincial Assembly: Ram Bahadur Magar, CPN (UML)
- Member of the Provincial Assembly: Dhirendra Sharma, CPN (MC)

Ilam 2 is one of two parliamentary constituencies of Ilam District in Nepal. This constituency came into existence on the Constituency Delimitation Commission (CDC) report submitted on 31 August 2017. The current member of parliament is Suhang Nembang.

== Incorporated areas ==
Ilam 2 incorporates Chulachuli Rural Municipality, Mangsebung Rural Municipality, Phakphokthum Rural Municipality, Deumai Municipality, wards 1–9, 11 and 12 of Ilam Municipality and wards 6–8 of Mai Municipality.

== Assembly segments ==
It encompasses the following Province No. 1 Provincial Assembly segment

- Ilam 2(A)
- Ilam 2(B)

== Members of Parliament ==
=== Parliament/Constituent Assembly ===
Election	Member	Party
1991	Mani Kumar Limbu	CPN (UML)
1994	Kul Bahadur Gurung	Nepali Congress
1999	Subas Chandra Nemwang	CPN (UML)
May 2018	Subas Chandra Nemwang	Nepal Communist Party
March 2021	Subas Chandra Nemwang	CPN (UML)
2024	Suhang Nembang	CPN (UML)
2026	Suhang Nembang	CPN (UML)

=== Provincial Assembly ===
==== 2(A) ====
Election	Member	Party
2017	Ram Bahadur Magar	CPN (UML)
May 2018	Ram Bahadur Magar	Nepal Communist Party
March 2021	Ram Bahadur Magar	CPN (UML)

==== 2(B) ====
Election	Member	Party
2017	Dhirendra Sharma	CPN (Maoist Centre)
May 2018	Dhirendra Sharma	Nepal Communist Party
March 2021	Dhirendra Sharma	CPN (Maoist Centre)

== Election results ==
=== Election in the 2020s ===
==== 2026 general election ====
Candidate	Party	Votes	%
Suhang Nembang	CPN (UML)	22,426	35.16
Bhesharaj Acharya	Nepali Congress	14,650	22.97
Sudip Rai	Shram Sanskriti Party	14,400	22.58
Gokul Bahadur Rai	Rastriya Swatantra Party	7,814	12.25
Om Bahadur Gurung	Nepali Communist Party	1,172	1.84
Others		3,319	5.20
Total		63,781	100.00
Majority			
CPN (UML) hold			

==== 2024 by-election ====
Candidate	Party	Votes	%
Suhang Nembang	CPN (UML)	27,772	40.56
Dambar Bahadur Khadka	Nepali Congress	21,942	32.05
Dakendra Thegim Limbu	Independent	11,457	16.73
Milan Yonghang Limbu	Rastriya Swatantra Party	5,050	7.38
Mani Kumar Limbu	Mongol National Organisation	816	1.19
Others		1,435	2.10
Total		68,472	100.00
Valid votes		68,472	98.70
Invalid/blank votes		902	1.30
Total votes		69,374	100.00
Registered voters/turnout		115,889	59.86
Majority			
CPN (UML) hold			

==== 2022 general election ====
Candidate	Party	Votes	%
Subas Chandra Nemwang	CPN (UML)	30,020	45.36
Dambar Bahadur Khadka	Nepali Congress	29,906	45.19
Prakash Sapkota	Rastriya Swatantra Party	1,380	2.09
Mani Bahadur Limbu	Mongol National Organisation	1,363	2.06
Khadga Prasad Palungwa Limbu	Rastriya Janamukti Party	1,272	1.92
Others		2,244	3.39
Total		66,185	100.00
Majority		114	
CPN (UML) hold			

==== 2022 provincial election ====
===== 2(A) =====
Candidate	Party	Votes	%
Gobinda Giri	Nepali Congress	16,658	46.67
Ganesh Prasad Baral	CPN (UML)	15,447	43.27
Lachhu Man Rai	Mongol National Organisation	1,535	4.30
Yam Nath Bhandari	Rastriya Prajatantra Party	975	2.73
Others		1,081	3.03
Total		35,696	100.00
Majority		1,211	
Nepali Congress			

===== 2(B) =====
Candidate	Party	Votes	%
Ram Bahadur Magar	CPN (UML)	13,754	44.39
Harka Bahadur Lawati Limbu	CPN (Maoist Centre)	11,167	36.04
Binay Kumar Phagu Limbu	Sanghiya Loktantrik Rastriya Manch	2,054	6.63
Pabitra Tumbangphe Limbu	Rastriya Janamukti Party	1,415	4.57
Bal Bahadur Angdembe Limbu	People's Socialist Party	798	2.58
Ujit Kumar Rai	Mongol National Organisation	739	2.38
Others		1,060	3.42
Total		30,987	100.00
Majority		2,587	
CPN (UML)			

=== Election in the 2010s ===
==== 2017 legislative elections ====
Party	Candidate	Votes
CPN (Unified Marxist–Leninist)	Subas Chandra Nemwang	36,517
Nepali Congress	Keshav Thapa	26,865
Sanghiya Loktantrik Rastriya Manch	Deepak Kumar Yonghang Limbu	1,761
Rastriya Janamukti Party	Khadga Prasad Palungwa Limbu	1,758
Federal Socialist Forum, Nepal	Krishna Bahadur Khatri	1,106
Others		832
Invalid votes		2,203
Result	CPN (UML) hold	
Source: Election Commission

==== 2017 Nepalese provincial elections ====
===== 2(A) =====
Party	Candidate	Votes
CPN (Unified Marxist–Leninist)	Ram Bahadur Magar	19,838
Nepali Congress	Dambar Bahadur Khadka	16,286
Others		1,016
Invalid votes		1,376
Result	CPN (UML) gain	
Source: Election Commission

===== 2(B) =====
Party	Candidate	Votes
CPN (Maoist Centre)	Dhirendra Sharma	14,716
Nepali Congress	Khagendra Devan Rai	11,065
Sanghiya Loktantrik Rastriya Manch	Thangsang Lawoti Limbu	2,254
Rastriya Janamukti Party	Jaya Kumar Kerung Limbu	1,532
Federal Socialist Forum, Nepal	Mani Bikram Limbu	1,357
Others		784
Invalid votes		1,037
Result	Maoist Centre gain	
Source: Election Commission

==== 2013 Constituent Assembly election ====
Party	Candidate	Votes
CPN (Unified Marxist–Leninist)	Subas Chandra Nemwang	14,930
Nepali Congress	Bhesh Raj Acharya	12,828
UCPN (Maoist)	Ramesh Kumar Lingden Limbu	4,648
Federal Socialist Party, Nepal	Binod Kumar Nemwang Limbu	2,486
Others		2,587
Result	CPN (UML) hold	
Source: NepalNews

=== Election in the 2000s ===
==== 2008 Constituent Assembly election ====
Party	Candidate	Votes
CPN (Unified Marxist–Leninist)	Subas Chandra Nemwang	17,748
Nepali Congress	Keshav Thapa	14,044
CPN (Maoist)	Harka Bahadur Lawoti Limbu	8,916
Sanghiya Loktantrik Rastriya Manch	Uttam Kumar Yonghang Limbu	1,678
Others		1,682
Invalid votes		2,099
Result	CPN (UML) hold	
Source: Election Commission

=== Election in the 1990s ===
==== 1999 legislative elections ====
Party	Candidate	Votes
CPN (Unified Marxist–Leninist)	Subas Chandra Nemwang	17,407
Nepali Congress	Kul Bahadur Gurung	15,482
Rastriya Janamukti Party	Sarna Bahadur Pandhak Limbu	3,498
Rastriya Prajatantra Party (Chand)	Padma Sundar Lawoti Limbu	1,475
Others		1,786
Invalid Votes		870
Result	CPN (UML) gain	
Source: Election Commission

==== 1994 legislative elections ====
Party	Candidate	Votes
Nepali Congress	Kul Bahadur Gurung	12,547
CPN (Unified Marxist–Leninist)	Mani Kumar Limbu	11,960
Rastriya Janamukti Party	Chandra Prasad Yangya Limbu	2,560
Independent	Chatur Man Limbu	2,396
Rastriya Prajatantra Party	Yam Prasad Chapagain	1,458
Result	Congress gain	
Source: Election Commission

==== 1991 legislative elections ====
Party	Candidate	Votes
CPN (Unified Marxist–Leninist)	Mani Kumar Limbu	19,759
Nepali Congress	Kul Bahadur Gurung	17,749
Result	CPN (UML) gain	

== See also ==
- List of parliamentary constituencies of Nepal
