= Ram Chandra Paudel =

President of Nepal since 2023

- रामचन्द्र पौडेल
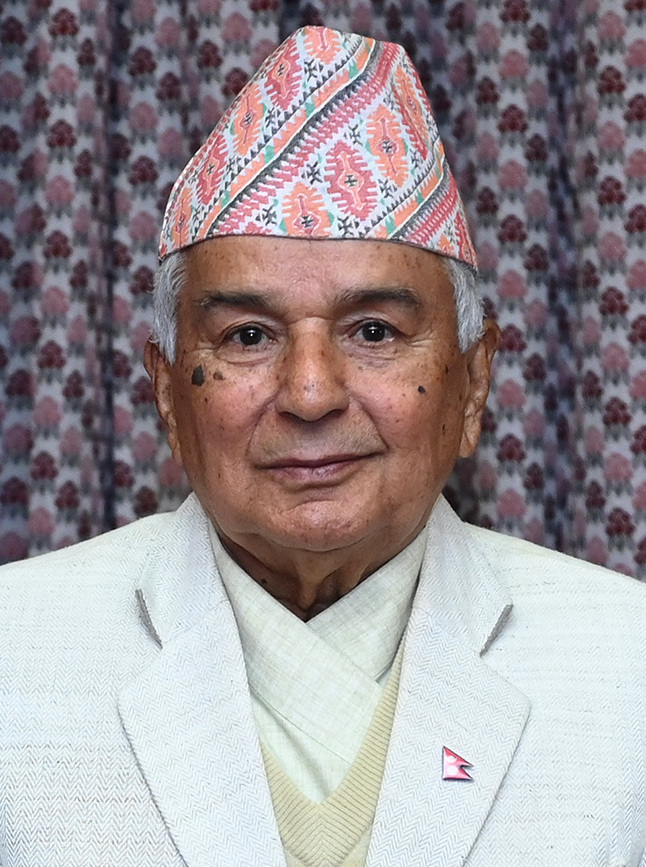
- Paudel in 2024

President of Nepal
- Incumbent
- Assumed office 13 March 2023
- Prime Minister: Pushpa Kamal Dahal; K. P. Sharma Oli; Sushila Karki (interim); Balen Shah
- Vice President: Nanda Kishor Pun; Ram Sahaya Yadav
- Preceded by: Bidya Devi Bhandari

Leader of the Opposition
- In office 6 February 2011 – 14 March 2013
- Prime Minister: Jhala Nath Khanal; Baburam Bhattarai
- Preceded by: Pushpa Kamal Dahal
- Succeeded by: Pushpa Kamal Dahal (2014)

Speaker of the House of Representatives
- In office 18 December 1994 – 23 March 1999
- Monarch: Birendra
- Deputy: Ram Vilas Yadav; Lila Shrestha Subba; Bhojraj Joshi
- Preceded by: Daman Nath Dhungana
- Succeeded by: Taranath Ranabhat
Ministerial positions
Deputy Prime Minister of Nepal
In office 1 February 2000 – 13 July 2001
Monarch	Birendra
Prime Minister	Krishna Prasad Bhattarai; Girija Prasad Koirala
Preceded by	Shailaja Acharya (1998) (Note: This position was vacant from 23 December 1998 until 1 February 2001.)
Succeeded by	Bharat Mohan Adhikari (2004) (Note: There was no deputy prime minister from 13 July 2001 until 5 July 2004.)
Minister of Home Affairs of Nepal
In office 29 September 2000 – 13 July 2001
Monarch	Birendra
Prime Minister	Girija Prasad Koirala
Preceded by	Govinda Raj Joshi
Succeeded by	Chakra Prasad Bastola
Minister of Education of Nepal
In office 10 March 2000 – 20 March 2000
Monarch	Birendra
Prime Minister	Krishna Prasad Bhattarai
Preceded by	Yog Prasad Upadhaya
Succeeded by	Amod Prasad Upadhyay
Minister of Agriculture of Nepal
In office 27 July 1992 – 30 November 1994
Monarch	Birendra
Prime Minister	Girija Prasad Koirala
Preceded by	Shailaja Acharya
Succeeded by	Radha Krishna Mainali
Minister of Local Development of Nepal
In office 21 March 2000 – 7 February 2001
Monarch	Birendra
Prime Minister	Girija Prasad Koirala
Preceded by	Chiranjibi Wagle
Succeeded by	Govinda Raj Joshi
In office 29 May 1991 – 30 November 1994
Monarch	Birendra
Prime Minister	Girija Prasad Koirala
Preceded by	Mahendra Narayan Nidhi
Succeeded by	C. P. Mainali
Minister of Information and Communication of Nepal
In office 1 February 2000 – 20 March 2000
Monarch	Birendra
Prime Minister	Girija Prasad Koirala
Preceded by	Purna Bahadur Khadka
Succeeded by	Jay Prakash Gupta
Minister of Peace and Reconstruction of Nepal
In office 1 April 2007 – 18 August 2008
President	Girija Prasad Koirala (as Acting Head of State of Nepal)
Prime Minister	Girija Prasad Koirala
Preceded by	Position established
Succeeded by	Janardan Sharma
Parliamentary offices
Member of the House of Representatives
In office 22 December 2022 – 9 March 2023
Preceded by	Krishna Kumar Shrestha
Succeeded by	Swarnim Wagle
Constituency	Tanahun 1
In office 28 April 2006 – 16 January 2008
Preceded by	Himself (2002)
Succeeded by	Himself (as Member of the Constituent Assembly)
Constituency	Tanahun 2
In office 15 December 1994 – 22 May 2002
Preceded by	Govinda Raj Joshi
Succeeded by	Himself (2006)
Constituency	Tanahun 2
In office 20 June 1991 – 11 July 1994
Preceded by	Constituency established
Succeeded by	Govinda Raj Joshi
Constituency	Tanahun 1
Member of the Constituent Assembly / Legislature Parliament
In office 28 May 2008 – 14 October 2017
Preceded by	Himself (as Member of Parliament)
Succeeded by	Kedar Sigdel (as Member of Parliament)
Constituency	Tanahun 2
Senior party positions
Vice President of the Nepali Congress
In office 2008–2016
Preceded by	Prakash Man Singh; Gopal Man Shrestha
Succeeded by	Bimalendra Nidhi

Personal details
- Born: 6 October 1944 (age 81) Tanahun, Nepal
- Party: Independent (since 2023)
- Other political affiliations: Nepali Congress (until 2023)
- Spouse: Sabita Poudel
- Children: 5

Ram Chandra Paudel (Note: Nepali: रामचन्द्र पौडेल, romanized: Rāmacandra Pauḍel; IPA: [rämt͡sʌn̪d̪rʌ‿pʌu̯ɽel]) (born 6 October 1944) is a Nepalese politician serving as the third president of Nepal since 2023. Paudel is a former senior leader of the Nepali Congress, he previously served as the speaker of the House of Representatives from 1994 to 1999, and was the deputy prime minister and Minister for Home Affairs from 1999 to 2002. First elected to parliament in 1991, Paudel served in numerous other ministerial positions and was the Leader of the Opposition from 2011 to 2013, as the parliamentary party leader of the Nepali Congress.

== Early life ==
Ram Chandra Paudel was born on 6 October 1944 in a Bahun farming family in the remote village of Satiswara, located in the present-day Vyas Municipality of Tanahun District. He completed his secondary education (SLC) from Nandi Ratri Secondary School in Kathmandu and studied Sanskrit literature at the Nepal Sanskrit University from 1963 to 1967. He also completed a MA in Nepali literature from the Tribhuvan University in 1970, appearing in his examinations while being detained in prison for anti-Panchayat activities.

== Political career ==
=== Early years and student politics (1960s and 1970s) ===
Paudel got into politics aged just 16 when he joined the protests and movement against the dismissal of the B.P. Koirala-led government and imposition of Panchayat rule by King Mahendra in December 1960, and participated in numerous Congress-led armed struggles for the restoration of democracy in the 1960s. A key campaigner for the students’ movement in Nepal, he was elected president of the student union at the Saraswati Campus in 1967 and elected general secretary of the Democratic Socialist Youth League in 1968.

Paudel, became a member of the Arjun Narasingha K.C. led Student Rally Coordination Committee along with Sher Bahadur Deuba. He took initiatives in organizing the Nepal Student Union, the Congress party’s student wing established in 1970, and was the union's founding central committee member.

=== Party politics (1970s – 2023) ===
Paudel entered into mainstream party politics in 1977, when he was elected member of the Nepali Congress Tanahun district committee. He was elected vice-president of the district committee in 1979, and president in 1980. Paudel was appointed coordinator of the Nepali Congress's Central Publicity Committee in 1983, and was appointed member of the party's central committee and chief of the party's central level publicity bureau in 1987.

Paudel was first elected to parliament from Tanahun 1 in the 1991 general election, and served as the Minister for Local Development and Agriculture from May 1991 to 1994.

In the 1994 general election, he switched seats and was elected from Tanahun 2, a seat he then held consecutively until 2017. Paudel was elected speaker of the House of Representatives following the election, and served until 1999. Following the 1999 general election, he was appointed deputy prime minister and Minister for Home Affairs, and he served in those positions until 2002. Paudel was elected general secretary of the Nepali Congress following the party's general convention in 2006. He played an important role in the peace process as the coordinator of the Peace Secretariat after the end of the civil war, and served as the Minister for Peace and Reconstruction from 2007 to 2008. Paudel was elected vice-president of the Nepali Congress in 2008, and defeated former prime minister Sher Bahadur Deuba to become Congress' parliamentary party leader following the 2008 Constituent Assembly election. Paudel contested the prime ministerial election in parliament in 2010, but was not elected even after 17 rounds of election. He served as the Congress party's acting president after the death of Sushil Koirala in 2016, but was defeated by Deuba in the party's 13th general convention later in the year.

Having decided to switch back to his old seat of Tanahun 1, Paudel was defeated by Krishna Kumar Shrestha of the CPN (UML) in the 2017 general election. He remained active in party politics, and was elected from Tanahun 1 in the 2022 general election.

=== Detentions ===
Paudel spent over 15 years as a prisoner of conscience on various occasions, mostly for being an opponent of the panchayat system. He was detained on the following occasions:

- For 10 months in 1962 in connection with the armed seizure of Bharatpur by Nepali Congress.
- For 12 months in 1964 in connection with student movements in Kathmandu.
- For 6 months in 1966 for being involved in a movement to oust the then-Deputy inspector General of Police.
- For 14 months in 1967 in connection with organisational activities of DSYL in Pokhara.
- For one year in 1969 in connection with the reorganization of DSYL in western Nepal.
- For 3 months in 1970 for being involved in the organization and inauguration of Nepal Student Union.
- For 4 years from 1971 to 1975 for being involved in revitalizing political activities after the release of B.P. Koirala.
- For 10 months in 1977 for being involved in the Patan Conference of the Nepali Congress, where a decision was taken to launch a civil disobedience movement (Satyagraha) for the restoration of democracy and release of its ailing leader, B.P. Koirala.
- For 6 months in 1979 for taking a leading role in anti-Panchayat movements
- For 6 months in 1981 in connection with the boycott of Panchayati elections.
- For 9 months in 1985 in connection with the civil disobedience movement (Satyagraha).
- For 3 months in 1988 on a charge of publishing a Nepali Congress organ and for breaching the Publication Act.
- For 5 months in 1989 on a charge of organizing and inspiring people to take part in movement for restoration of democracy.
- For about one and half years from 2003 to 2005 during the King's direct rule.

== Presidency (2023–present) ==
Paudel was the candidate from Nepali Congress and its 10-party alliance for the 2023 presidential election, and was elected president on 9 March 2023, defeating former speaker Subas Chandra Nemwang of the CPN (UML). He disassociated himself from all party responsibilities and resigned as an active member of the Nepali Congress after being elected president. Paudel resigned as member of Parliament before assuming office as president on 13 March 2023.

There were reports that Paudel had resigned as a result of the 2025 Gen Z protests. He denied those reports and the Nepali Army confirmed that Paudel did not resign. His official residence as president, the Rastrapati Bhawan, was also set ablaze during the protests.

== Personal life ==
Paudel is married to Sabita Poudel, who became Nepal’s first First Lady. and the couple have five children: four daughters and one son.

=== Publications ===
Paudel is an active writer and his political and theoretical affairs are frequently published in national vernaculars, including:

- What Nepali Congress Says (1976)
- Satyagraha – Why and How (1984)
- Democratic Socialism – A study (1990)
- Journey of Faith (1996)
- Abhisapta Itihas (2004)
- Socialism – In New Context (2012)
- Agricultural Revolution and Socialism (2013)

Paudel received the Mahendra Bikram Shah Prize for an article titled "Human Rights Condition in Nepal" in 1987.

== Honors ==
- Japan: Grand Cordon of the Order of the Rising Sun (29 April 2020) – for contributions in enhancing Nepal-Japan ties

== Notes ==
Political offices
Preceded by Bidya Devi Bhandari	President of Nepal; 2023–present	Incumbent
