= Kul Bahadur Gurung =

Nepali politician

- कुलबहादुर गुरुङ

General Secretary of Nepali Congress
- In office 2006–2010 Serving with Bimalendra Nidhi; Ram Baran Yadav
- President: Girija Prasad Koirala
- Preceded by: Girija Prasad Koirala
- Succeeded by: Prakash Man Singh; Krishna Prasad Sitaula

Personal details
- Born: 23 November 1934 (age 91) Ilam Nepal
- Party: Nepali Congress
- Spouse: Mrs. Ratna Gurung
- Nickname: KB Gurung

Kul Bahadur Gurung (Nepali: कुल बहादुर गुरुङ) is a Nepalese politician and leader of the Nepali Congress party. Gurung has worked as general secretary of the party. He was Minister of Education in the cabinet of Girija Prasad Koirala in 1997.

Gurung was born on 23 November 1934 and trained as a teacher becoming deputy headmaster at Adarsha High School in Ilam, Nepal. Active in politics from a young age, he was a member of Tarun Dal, the youth wing of the Nepali Congress Party. He was exiled to India for four years, imprisoned in 1976 and again in 1990 during the 1990 Nepalese revolution. Gurung served as general secretary of the Nepali Congress party and was elected to the Nepali Parliament in 1994 as the member for Ilam 2 constituency. He was appointed Minister for Education in December 1997.

In the 2008 Constituent Assembly election he was elected to the assembly from the Ilam-3 constituency, winning 16,286 votes. At 73 years, Gurung was the oldest assembly member elected through the First Past the Post system. He was the acting chairman of the Constituent Assembly until the election of Subhas Chandra Nemwang to the post. The first session of the first Constitution Assembly chaired by Gurung ended the 270 years old monarchy in Nepal and declared Republic.

Nepali Congress raised Gurung as the candidate for the 2015 Nepalese presidential election, which was won by Bidya Devi Bhandari. In 2016, Gurung was leader of the Nepali Congress party and was elected chairman of Parliamentary Hearing Special Committee responsible for conducting hearings for people recommended for constitutional and diplomatic positions, such as justices and diplomats.

== See also ==
- Gurung
