= B B Phuyal =

Nepalese film director

B.B Phuyal
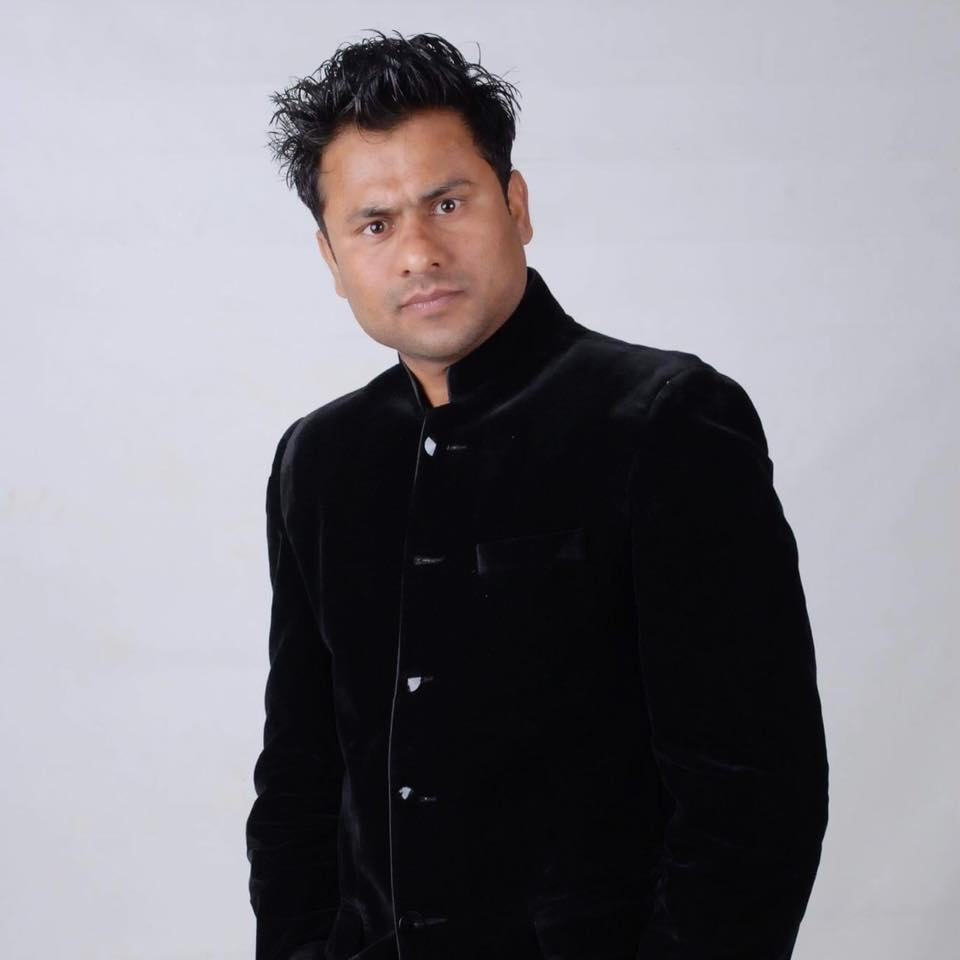
- Born: May 26, 1986; Ramailo, Morang, Nepal
- Occupations: Film Director; Producer; Short Film Director
- Years active: 2005-present
- Known for: Bhanu Bhakta Phuyal
- Spouse: Neha bhetwal
- Parents: Laxmi Pd Phuyal (father); Nirmala devi Phuyal (mother)
- Awards: Box Office Award 2013

B B Phuyal (known as Bhanu Bhakta Phuyal; born 26 May 1986) is a well-known film director in the Nepali film industry for more than 12 years and chairman of Phuyal Shooting Studio Pvt. Ltd. He has started his career in this sector as an assistant director and actor. Later on, he paid attention to other dimensions of filmmaking such as production, cinematography, and direction besides acting. He has produced and directed several Nepali movies, documentaries and also music videos. His work as a director include the films The Last Kiss, Champion, and Love you Man. He has his own studio, Phuyal Shooting Studio.

== Early life ==
Phuyal has been passionate about movies since childhood. In 2005, he got an opportunity to work in Nepali film as assistant director. The same year, he directed and played in another Nepali teleserial, Barbadai paryo.

== Filmography ==
| Movie | Year | Role |
|---|---|---|
| Champion | 2015 | Director |
| Love you Man | 2012 | Director |
| Last Kiss | 2012 | Director |
| Romance | 2013 | Director |
| RaktaBhog | 2014 | Director |

== Awards ==
| Year | Award | Category | Movie | Result |
|---|---|---|---|---|
| 2013 | Box Office Cine Award 2013 | Director | The Last Kiss | Won |
