= Jhala Nath Khanal =

Nepalese politician (born 1950)

- झलनाथ खनाल
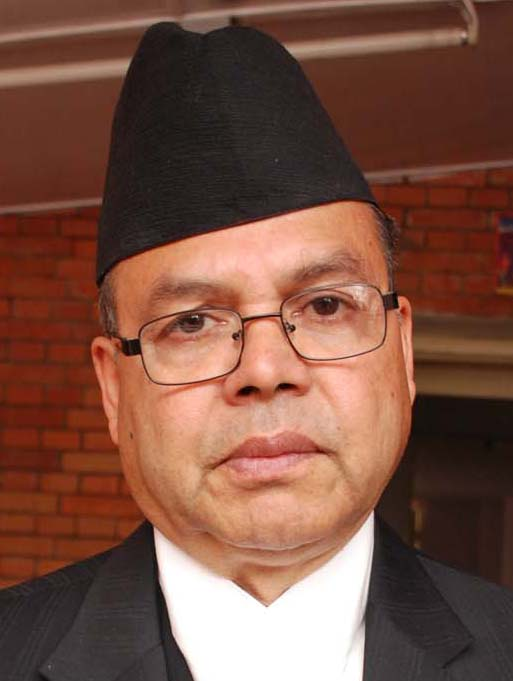
- Khanal in 2011

Prime Minister of Nepal
- In office 6 February 2011 – 29 August 2011
- President: Ram Baran Yadav
- Preceded by: Madhav Kumar Nepal
- Succeeded by: Baburam Bhattarai

Chairman of CPN (UML)
- In office 16 February 2009 – 15 July 2014
- Preceded by: Man Mohan Adhikari (1999) (Note: Khanal previously led CPN (UML) as General Secretary.)
- Succeeded by: K. P. Sharma Oli

General Secretary of CPN (UML)
- In office 15 May 2008 – 16 February 2009
- Preceded by: Madhav Kumar Nepal
- Succeeded by: Ishwar Pokhrel (Note: Khanal continued serving as party leader as Chairman.)

Minister for Information and Communication
- In office 25 March 1997 – 6 October 1997
- Prime Minister: Lokendra Bahadur Chand
- Preceded by: Chiranjibi Wagle
- Succeeded by: Sarbendra Nath Shukla

Member of the House of Representatives
- In office 4 March 2018 – 18 September 2022
- Preceded by: Himself (as Member of the Constituent Assembly)
- Succeeded by: Mahesh Basnet
- Constituency: Ilam 1
- In office 20 June 1991 – 15 January 1999
- Preceded by: Constituency created
- Succeeded by: Benup Raj Prasai
- Constituency: Ilam 1

Member of the Constituent Assembly / Legislature Parliament
- In office 28 May 2008 – 14 October 2017
- Preceded by: Benup Raj Prasai (as Member of Parliament)
- Succeeded by: Himself (as Member of Parliament)
- Constituency: Ilam 1

Personal details
- Born: 20 May 1950 (age 76) Sakhejung, Ilam, Nepal
- Party: Nepali Communist Party
- Other political affiliations: CPN (UML) (until 2018; 2021); Nepal Communist Party (2018–2021); CPN (Unified Socialist) (2021–2025)
- Spouse: Ravi Laxmi Chitrakar

Jhala Nath Khanal (Nepali: झलनाथ खनाल, [d͡zʱʌlʌˈnatʰ ˈkʰʌnal]; born 20 May 1950) is a Nepalese politician who was the 35th Prime Minister of Nepal from February 2011 to August 2011. He was previously the chairman of the CPN (UML) and Leader of the Constituent Assembly Parliamentary Party of the CPN (UML).

Since 5 November 2025, he has been serving as the senior leader of the Nepali Communist Party, a new party formed through merger of eight different communist parties and splinter groups.

== Life ==
Khanal was born in Sakhejung of Ilam District to a hill Brahmin family of the Khanal clan.

== Political career ==
Khanal was a member of the Communist Party of Nepal (Marxist-Leninist), and its General Secretary from 1982 to 1986. Later, he became a member of the Communist Party of Nepal (Unified Marxist–Leninist).

=== Government posts ===
Khanal served for a time as Minister of Information and Communication in the 1997 coalition government under Surya Bahadur Thapa.

Khanal won the seat of the Ilam 1 constituency in the 2008 Constituent Assembly election. He led the CPN (UML) as General Secretary from 2008 to February 2009 and was elected Chairman of the CPN (UML) on February 16, 2009.

=== Premiership ===
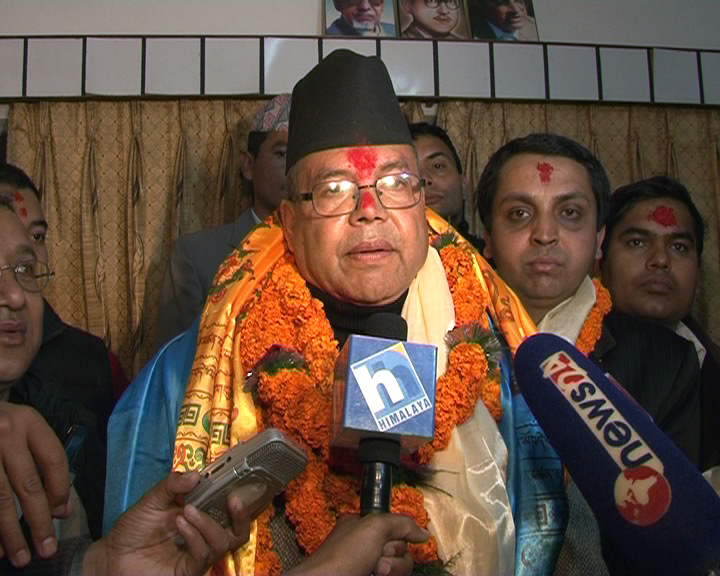
Jhala Nath Khanal after being elected Prime Minister of Nepal

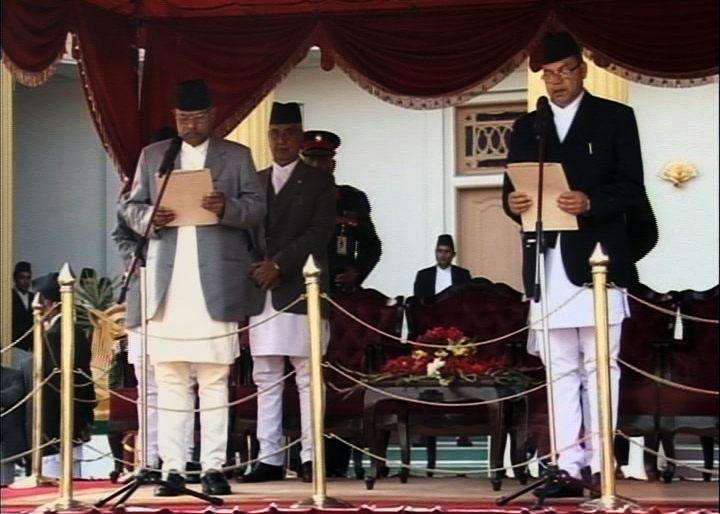
Oath-taking ceremony, 6 February 2011

On 3 February 2011, after seven months of political gridlock in which no candidate could muster enough votes to be elected as Prime Minister, Jhala Nath Khanal was elected Prime Minister by the 1st Nepalese Constituent Assembly. Khanal received 368 votes in the 601-member parliament, while his nearest rivals, Ram Chandra Poudel of the Nepali Congress got 122 votes and Bijay Kumar Gachhedar of Madhesi Jana Adhikar Forum (Loktantrik) got 67 votes.

Nepal had no proper government since Madhav Kumar Nepal resigned in June 2010. Nepal ran interim government for nearly eight months. Sixteen rounds of voting in parliament since July were unable to produce a new Prime minister as no political party could muster a majority. However, on 3 February 2011 the Unified Communist Party of Nepal (Maoist) withdrew its candidate, Pushpa Kamal Dahal, and backed Khanal. As a result, he became the third Prime Minister of Nepal since it became a federal democratic republic in 2008.

Khanal resigned on 29 August 2011 after nearly six months after the parties failed to agree on the constitution drafting and the peace process amidst a new political crisis. The extended duration of Constituent Assembly was to expire on 31 August 2011.

The Nepali Congress and the Madhesi parties had asked the Prime Minister to resign immediately after being unsuccessful in completing peace process and drafting a new constitution. Even the party leaders increased pressure on Mr. Khanal in order to prevent the party from notoriety.

== Electoral history ==
=== 2022 legislative election ===
Candidate	Party	Votes	%
Mahesh Basnet	CPN (UML)	25,753	45.17
Jhalanath Khanal	CPN (Unified Socialist)	23,089	40.49
Budhha Lal Meche	Mongol National Organisation	2,442	4.28
Toyanath Sharma Sapkota	Rastriya Prajatantra Party	1,599	2.80
Kamal Kumar Rai	People's Socialist Party, Nepal	1,313	2.30
Bikram Pandey	Independent	1,184	2.08
Others		1,638	2.87
Total		57,018	100.00
Majority		2,664	
CPN (UML) gain			

=== 2017 legislative elections ===
Ilam 1
Party	Candidate	Votes
CPN (UML)	Jhala Nath Khanal	36,805
Nepali Congress	Bhupendra Kattel	19,638
Federal Socialist Forum, Nepal	Subas Rai	2,059
Mongol National Organisation	Surya Kumar Gurung	1,710
Others		1,902
Invalid votes		2,365
Result	CPN (UML) hold	
Source: Election Commission

=== 2013 Constituent Assembly election ===
Sarlahi 1
Party	Candidate	Votes
Nepali Congress	Shambhu Lal Shrestha	9,476
CPN (Unified Marxist–Leninist)	Jhala Nath Khanal	8,791
Terai Madhesh Sadbhavna Party	Chandra Singh Kushwaha	4,588
Rastriya Prajatantra Party Nepal	Narayan Shrestha	2,729
Terai Madhesh Loktantrik Party	Gopal Panjiyar	2,050
Sadbhavana Party	Rup Narayan Singh Danuwar	1,614
Madhesi Jana Adhikar Forum, Nepal (Democratic)	Shiva Kumar Gurmachhane	1,399
Rastriya Madhesh Samajbadi Party	Jagat Narayan Shrestha	1,107
Others		2,466
Result	NC gain	
Source: NepalNews

Ilam 1
Party	Candidate	Votes
CPN (Unified Marxist–Leninist)	Jhala Nath Khanal	17,342
Nepali Congress	Himalaya Karmacharya	15,527
Federal Socialist Party, Nepal	Devendra Kumar Rai	4,529
UCPN (Maoist)	Yuba Kumar Paudel	4,420
Others		2,423
Result	CPN (UML) hold	
Source: NepalNews

=== 2011 Parliamentary Prime Minister election ===
Party	Candidate	Votes	Status
CPN (UML)	Jhala Nath Khanal	368	Elected
Nepali Congress	Ram Chandra Poudel	122	Lost
Madhesi Jana Adhikar Forum (Loktantrik)	Bijay Kumar Gachhadar	67	Lost

=== 2008 Constituent Assembly election ===
Ilam 1
Party	Candidate	Votes
CPN (Unified Marxist–Leninist)	Jhala Nath Khanal	17,655
Nepali Congress	Benup Raj Prasai	13,774
CPN (Maoist)	Surya Prakash Bala	10,917
Rastriya Prajatantra Party	Lila Devi Shrestha	2,167
Others		2,040
Invalid votes		2,086
Result	CPN (UML) gain	
Source: Election Commission

=== 1999 legislative elections ===
Ilam 1
Party	Candidate	Votes
Nepali Congress	Benup Raj Prasai	18,608
CPN (Unified Marxist–Leninist)	Jhala Nath Khanal	18,502
Rastriya Prajatantra Party	Ganesh Rasik Rai	1,919
Others		1,715
Invalid Votes		758
Result	Congress gain	
Source: Election Commission

=== 1994 legislative elections ===
Ilam 1
Party	Candidate	Votes
CPN (Unified Marxist–Leninist)	Jhala Nath Khanal	14,383
Nepali Congress	Toya Nath Bhattarai	14,173
Independent	Gopal Gurung	1,611
Rastriya Prajatantra Party	Chandra Kant Bhat Rai	1,428
Rastriya Janamukti Party	Chanra Bahadur Thulung	1,030
Others		508
Result	CPN (UML) hold	
Source: Election Commission

=== 1991 legislative elections ===
Ilam 1
Party	Candidate	Votes
CPN (Unified Marxist–Leninist)	Jhala Nath Khanal	25,540
Nepali Congress	Toya Nath Bhattarai	19,270
Result	CPN (UML) gain	

== See also ==
- 2021 split in Communist Party of Nepal (Unified Marxist-Leninist)

== Notes ==
Party political offices
Preceded by Madhav Kumar Nepal	Chairman of the Communist Party of Nepal (Unified Marxist-Leninist); 2009–2014	Succeeded by Khadga Prasad Oli
Political offices
Preceded by Madhav Kumar Nepal	Prime Minister of Nepal; 2011	Succeeded by Baburam Bhattarai
