= Press Foundation of Asia =

Press Foundation of Asia is press to look beyond national borders and speak intelligently to complex issues of regional change and development of Asia. The organization was awarded Ramon Magsaysay Award in 1991.
