= 2015 Nepalese presidential election =

Presidential election in Nepal

- 28 October 2015
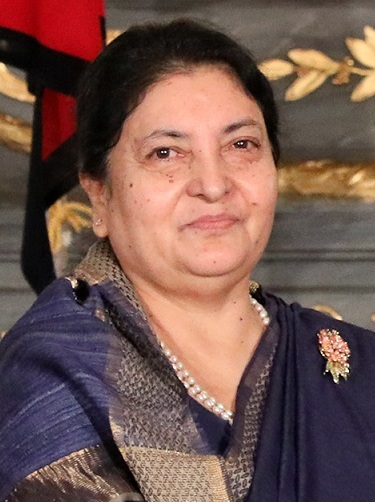

Candidate	Bidya Devi Bhandari	Kul Bahadur Gurung
Party	CPN (UML)	Congress
Home state	Bhojpur	Rolpa
Running mate	Nanda Kishor Pun	Amiya Kumar Yadav
Electoral vote	327	214
Percentage	59.56%	38.98%
President before election
Ram Baran Yadav
Congress
Elected President
Bidya Devi Bhandari
CPN (UML)

Indirect presidential elections were held in Nepal on 28 October 2015. Bidya Devi Bhandari of the Communist Party of Nepal (Unified Marxist–Leninist) was elected president, becoming Nepal's first female head of state.

== Results ==
=== President ===
For the presidential election, one candidate needed to gather 299 votes. 549 out of 596 eligible lawmakers cast their votes.

Candidate	Party	Votes	%
Bidya Devi Bhandari	Communist Party of Nepal (Unified Marxist–Leninist)	327	60.44
Kul Bahadur Gurung	Nepali Congress	214	39.56
Total		541	100.00
Valid votes		541	98.54
Invalid/blank votes		8	1.46
Total votes		549	100.00
Registered voters/turnout		596	92.11
Source: The Himalayan Times

=== Vice-President ===
The Vice-presidential election took place three days after the presidential election. After Dayaram Kandel (Nepal Pariwar Dal) Attahar Kamal Musalman (independent) withdrew their candidacies, two candidates remained. 547 out of 596 eligible lawmakers cast their votes.

Candidate	Party	Votes	%
Nanda Kishor Pun	Communist Party of Nepal (Unified Marxist–Leninist)	325	60.52
Amiya Kumar Yadav	Nepali Congress	212	39.48
Total		537	100.00
Valid votes		537	98.17
Invalid/blank votes		10	1.83
Total votes		547	100.00
Registered voters/turnout		596	91.78
Source: The Himalayan Times
