= Subas Chandra Nembang =

Nepali politician (1953–2023)

- सुवासचन्द्र नेम्वाङ
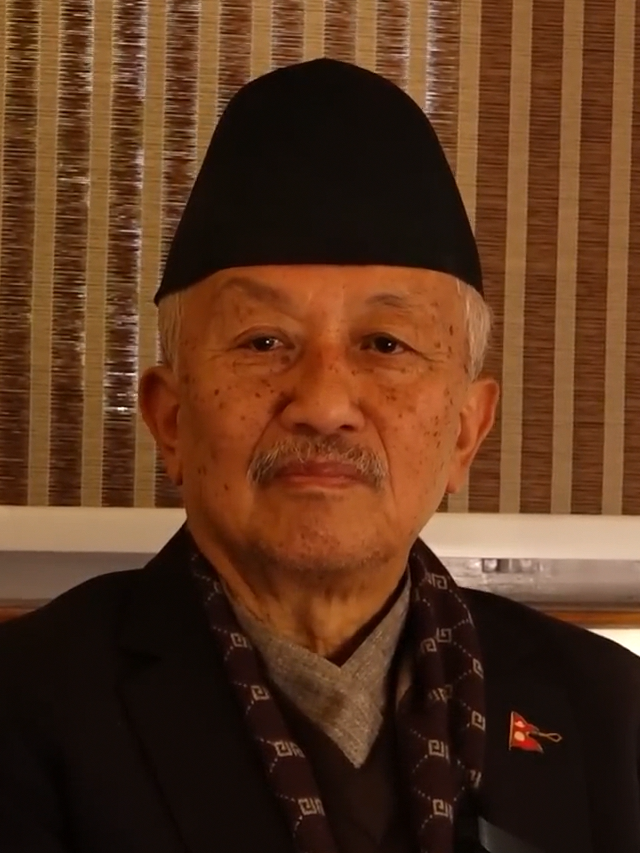
- Nembang in 2022

Chairman of the Constituent Assembly of Nepal
- In office 15 January 2007 – 16 October 2015
- President: Girija Prasad Koirala (interim); Ram Baran Yadav; Bidya Devi Bhandari
- Preceded by: Himself (as Speaker of the Pratinidhi Sabha)
- Succeeded by: Onsari Gharti Magar (as Speaker of the Legislature Parliament)

5th Speaker of the House of Representatives
- In office 13 May 2006 – 15 January 2007
- Monarch: Gyanendra
- Deputy: Chitra Lekha Yadav
- Preceded by: Taranath Ranabhat
- Succeeded by: Himself (as Chairman of the Constituent Assembly)

State Minister for Minister of Law, Justice and Parliamentary Affairs
- In office 1994–1995
- Monarch: Birendra Bir Bikram Shah
- Prime Minister: Man Mohan Adhikari

Member of the House of Representatives
- In office 4 March 2018 – 12 September 2023
- Preceded by: Himself (as member of the Constituent Assembly)
- Succeeded by: Suhang Nembang
- Constituency: Ilam 2
- In office May 1999 – May 2002
- Preceded by: Kul Bahadur Gurung
- Succeeded by: Himself (as member of the Constituent Assembly)
- Constituency: Ilam 2

Member of the Constituent Assembly
- In office 28 May 2008 – 14 October 2017
- Constituency: Ilam 2

Member of the National Assembly
- In office 13 November 1995 – May 1999
- In office 26 June 1991 – 26 June 1993
- Constituency: Eastern Region

Personal details
- Born: 11 March 1953 Suntalabari, Nepal
- Died: 12 September 2023 (aged 70) Kathmandu, Nepal
- Party: CPN (UML) (1991–2018, 2021–2023)
- Other political affiliations: CPN ML (Before 1991); Nepal Communist Party (NCP) (2018–2021)
- Children: Suhang Nembang
- Parents: Ram Bahadur Nembang (father); Apindra Kumari Nembang (mother)

Subas Chandra Nembang (Limbu) (Nepali: सुवासचन्द्र नेम्वाङ (लिम्बु); 11 March 1953 – 12 September 2023) was a Nepalese politician who served as chairman of Constituent Assembly of Nepal. He was the first elected Free Students Union chairman of Mahendra Ratna Campus in Ilam and also elected as general secretary of Nepal Bar Association in 2023.

Nembang was an unsuccessful candidate for president in the March 2023 election. He died of a heart attack six months after the election.

== Early career ==
Nembang was born in Suntalabari at Ilam District of eastern Nepal. He entered in to politics while he was student at law school. He was jailed for seven months during Panchayat era for crime against state.

Nembang emerged victorious from Ilam-2 in all elections held after the restoration of democracy in 1990. He won both legislative elections of 1991 and 1999, and went on to hold key posts like the chairman of Public Accounts Committee. In 2051 BS, he worked as state Minister for Ministry of Law.

== Constitution assembly elections ==
In the CA election 2009, Nembang was elected from Ilam-3. He again contested and won from Ilam-2 in the CA election 2013. He led the Constituent Assembly 2 as the Speaker which passed and promulgated the Constitution of Nepal 2015. He has worked as a chairman of constitution assembly for multiple times:

- 1 Magh 2063 BS to 14 Jestha 2065 BS
- 22 Shrawan 2065 to 14 Jesth 2069 BS
- 6 Falgun 2070 to 27 Asoj 2072 BS

== General election after constitution assembly ==
He got elected in general election in 2074 and 2079 BS as well. He was a candidate for presidential election in 2079 BS, which he lost to Ram Chandra Poudel.

== Personal life and death ==
Nembang was married and had four children—two daughters and two sons.

On 12 September 2023, Nembang died from a heart attack at home. He was 70 years old.

== Awards ==
- Sambidhan Sabha
- Rastriya Gaurav awards

== See also ==
- Sushil Koirala
- Surya Bahadur Thapa
- Lokendra Bahadur Chand
- Girija Prasad Koirala
- Prachanda
- Baburam Bhattarai
- Jhala Nath Khanal
