= Constituent Assembly of Nepal =

Constituent Assembly of Nepal may refer to:

- 1st Nepalese Constituent Assembly
- 2nd Nepalese Constituent Assembly
