= Mahesh Basnet (born 1960) =

Nepali politician

- महेश बस्नेत

Member of Parliament, Pratinidhi Sabha
- In office 24 December 2022 – 12 September 2025
- Preceded by: Jhalanath Khanal
- Succeeded by: Nishkal Rai
- Constituency: Ilam 1

Personal details
- Born: 31 August 1960 (age 65) Ilam District
- Party: CPN (UML)
- Spouse: Kunti Gurung
- Parent: Padam Bahadur Basnet (father)

Mahesh Basnet (Nepali: महेश बस्नेत) is a Nepalese politician, belonging to CPN (UML), who served as a member of the 2nd Federal Parliament of Nepal. In the 2022 Nepalese general election, he was elected from the Ilam 1.
