= Suhang Nembang =

Nepali politician

- सुहाङ नेम्वाङ

Member of the House of Representatives
- Incumbent
- Assumed office 26 March 2026
- Preceded by: Himself
- Constituency: Ilam 2
- In office 8 May 2024 – 12 September 2025
- Preceded by: Subas Chandra Nemwang
- Succeeded by: Himself
- Constituency: Ilam 2

Personal details
- Born: 17 February 1990 (age 36) Kathmandu, Nepal
- Party: CPN (UML)
- Parent(s): Subas Chandra Nemwang (father)
- Profession: Lawyer; Politician

Suhang Nembang (Nepali: सुहाङ नेम्वाङ) is a Nepalese politician and lawyer currently serving as a Member of the House of Representatives in the federal parliament of Nepal. He represents the Ilam-2 constituency and is affiliated with the Communist Party of Nepal (Unified Marxist–Leninist), commonly known as CPN-UML. Nembang was elected in a by-election held in April 2024, following the passing of his father, Subas Chandra Nemwang, a prominent political figure and former Speaker of the House. He was re-elected from the same constituency in the 2026 Nepalese general election.

== Early life and education ==
Suhang Nembang was born on 17 February 1990 in Kathmandu, Nepal. He is the youngest of four children in the family of Subas Chandra Nembang. He completed his School Leaving Certificate (SLC) from Jagat Mandir Secondary School and pursued higher secondary education at Gyanodaya Bal Batika. He later moved to Australia for further studies but returned to Nepal and enrolled at Kathmandu School of Law. He holds a Bachelor of Arts and Bachelor of Laws (BALLB) degree, as well as a Master of Laws (LLM) with a specialization in commercial law.

== Legal career ==
Before entering politics, Nembang established himself as a legal professional. He founded the Kantipur Law Associates and Research Center in Thapagaun, Kathmandu, where he practiced law focusing on commercial and constitutional matters. He also served as a central member of the legal department within the CPN-UML.

== Political career ==
Nembang entered active politics following the death of his father and quickly rose to national attention as a first-time candidate with a legal background.

=== 2024 by-election ===
The by-election for the Ilam-2 constituency was held on 27 April 2024. Nembang won the seat by securing 27,772 votes, defeating Dambar Bahadur Khadka of the Nepali Congress by a margin of 5,830 votes. His campaign emphasized political continuity, youth engagement, and governance reform.

=== 2026 by-election ===
In the 2026 Nepalese general election held on 5 March 2026, Nembang was re-elected from the Ilam 2 constituency. He secured 22,426 votes, defeating his closest rival Bheshraj Acharya of the Nepali Congress by a margin of 7,776 votes.

=== 2026 general election ===
2026 Nepalese general election: Ilam-2
Party	Candidate	Votes	%	±%
CPN (UML)	Suhang Nembang	22,426	35.16	−5.40
Congress	Bheshraj Acharya	14,650	22.97	−9.08
Shram Sanskriti	Sudip Rai	14,400	22.58	+22.58
Majority		7,776	12.19	+3.68
Registered electors		{{{reg. electors}}}		
		Swing		

=== Parliamentary priorities ===
After taking his oath of office on 8 May 2024, Nembang identified several key priorities for his tenure. These include addressing local development issues in Ilam, working on legislative reforms, and promoting good governance. He has also expressed a strong commitment to increasing youth participation in politics and maintaining democratic values.
