= Govinda Raj Joshi =

Nepali politician

Personal details
- Born: 12 August 1949 Khalte Village, Tanahun, Nepal
- Citizenship: Nepalese
- Party: Nepali Congress
- Spouse: Hem K Joshi
- Children: 3
- Education: M.A., B.L., B.ED
- Alma mater: Tribhuvan University
- Occupation: Politics
- Website: www.grjoshi.com.np

Govinda Raj Joshi is a Nepalese politician. Govinda Raj Joshi was born in 1949 at Khalte village in Rupakot Village Development Committee of Tanahun district, Nepal, He stepped into the field of politics in 1964 when he had just begun his student life. Joshi who regards late BP Koirala as his ideal was the president of the free student union (College of Education) and Gandaki Student Council in 1967. Joshi was a member of Tarun Dal, the youth wing of the Nepali Congress Party, in the year 1969 in Tanahun district, He formed the Nepali Congress Tanahun district committee and was the secretary of Nepali Congress, Tanahun, in 1976, He was the secretary of the multiparty campaign committee of Nepali Congress Party in 1979, He was the vice- president of Nepali Congress Party, Tanahun district and eventually made it to the central committee member of the party in the year 1997. Likewise, Mr. Joshi was elected as a central committee member of the party in the year 2000. Twice a central committee member; Mr. Joshi has already held the post of a joint general secretary of the party. He actively worked as a coordinator while the construction of the Nepali Congress Party Building was underway at Sanepa, Lalitpur. Joshi who started his career as a teacher was also the founder of Tribhuwan High School, Tanahu district. He was the founding headmaster of the school and taught at the very school for six years as a volunteer and spent his personal money to establish a high school in his own village. Later on, he was the headmaster of Shiva Secondary School Rising and also the founder of Adikabi Bhanubhakta Multiple College, Tanahun. He taught at the very college for two years as a volunteer.

A student of Law, Mr. Joshi also practiced for 12 years and was also president of Nepal Bar tanahun and vice president of Nepal bar western regional court Pokhara and associated with Nepal Bar Association and Amnesty International. Mr. Joshi was jailed at the inception of the Nepal Student Union in the year 1970 and He was imprisoned for the first time in 1966 vs. During the course of the struggle carried out by the Nepali Congress Party for the restoration of Democracy, Joshi was jailed on and off for a total length of 3 and a half years. Joshi was elected as a member of the Nepalese parliament in the parliamentary elections held in the years 1991, 1994, and 1991. Mr. Joshi also worked as a cwc member of the Nepali Congress Party. A chief whip of the party in the parliament in the year 1991.

He also held several important portfolios in the governments formed by Nepali Congress Party in different years: Minister for Education, Culture and Social Welfare (1991-1994), Education Minister (1995-1996), Home Minister (1998), Home and General Administration Minister (1998), Minister for Water Resource (1999), Home Minister again in 2000, Minister for Local Development and later Minister for Culture, Tourism and Civil Aviation (2001). Mr. Joshi has already served as president in different unions, as the chairman of the Nepal Olympic Committee, and has worked as the chairperson of the Nepal National Commission and Education Improvement Commission for UNESCO. Mr. Joshi s publication are:-Mera Anubhatiharu Part one, Mera Anubhatiharu Part Two, Mera Anubhatiharu Part Three, Sabdachitrama NepalNepali Congress (Bigat, Bartaman ra Bhabisya) Nepalma Shanghiya Shasan Pranali) Mr. Joshi has visited India, Bangladesh, Pakistan, Sri Lanka, Thailand, Malaysia, Hong Kong, United Arab Emirates, Singapore, Australia, China, North Korea, South Korea, France, Germany, Denmark, Switzerland, United Kingdom, United States of America, Japan, and Canada.

He has headed the Nepali delegations in various seminars, conventions, and conferences conducted both home and abroad. Mr. Joshi took part in the people's movement after the royal takeover in 2002. Being all senior leaders in prison he as a joint general secretary of the Nepali Congress was the one to announce stiff protest programs from the Nepali Congress Party side. Mr. Joshi, who was the one to design the basic concept of a five-party alliance, was also the one to go to Delhi to formally initiate the talks with the Maoists. The role he played during the splitting up of the Nepali Congress Party and the construction of the party office building is still exalted by everyone. He has represented from Tanahun district in all the parliamentary elections held after the restoration of democracy in 1989. He is also portrayed as the potential leader of the party.

== Early life ==
Joshi who started his career as a teacher was also the founder of Tribhuwan High School, Tanahu district, Principal of Shiva Secondary School, Rishing and also the founder of Bhanubhakta Multiple College, Tanahun. He taught at the very college for two years as a volunteer. A student of Law, Mr Joshi also practiced for 12 years and was also associated with Nepal Bar Association and Amnesty International. Mr. Joshi was jailed at the inception of the Nepal Student Union in 1970 and during the course of the struggle carried out by Nepali Congress Party for the restoration of Democracy, was jailed on and off for a total length of 3 and a half years.

== Education ==
Govinda Raj Joshi has a Masters in Political Science, Bachelor of Law and Bachelor of Education from Tribhuvan University, Kathmandu.

== Political ==
Elected as a member of the Nepalese parliament in the parliamentary elections held in the years 1991, 1994, and 1991. Mr. Joshi also worked as a member secretary of the Nepali Congress Party. A chief whip of the party in the parliament in 1991. Mr. Joshi also held several important portfolios in the governments formed by Nepali Congress Party in different years: Minister for Education, Culture and Social Welfare (1991–1994), Education Minister (1995–1996), Home Minister (1998), Home and General Administration Minister (2005), Minister for Water Resource (1999), Home Minister again in 2000, Minister for Local Development and later Minister for Culture, Tourism and Civil Aviation (2001).

Mr. Joshi has already served as president in different unions and has worked as the chairperson of Nepal National Commission and Education Improvement Commission for UNESCO.

Mr. Joshi has visited India, Bangladesh, Pakistan, Sri Lanka, Thailand, Malaysia, Hong Kong, United Arab Emirates, Singapore, Australia, China, North Korea, South Korea, France, Germany, Denmark, Switzerland, United Kingdom, United States of America, Japan and Canada. He has headed the Nepali delegations in various seminars, conventions and conferences conducted both home and abroad.

Joshi took part in the people's movement after the royal takeover in 2002. He was the one to announce stiff protest programs from the Nepali Congress Party side. Mr Joshi, who was the one to design the basic concept of the five-party alliance, was also the one to go to Delhi to formally initiate the talks with the Maoists. The role he played during the splitting up of the Nepali Congress Party and the construction of the party office building is still exalted by everyone. He has represented from Tanahun district in all the parliamentary elections held after the restoration of democracy in 1989. He used to be portrayed as the potential leader of the party. However, it is believed that following the court's decision to send him to jail for one and a half years, his political career is over.

== Controversy ==
The Special Court, Kathmandu on 25 July 2012 convicted Mr. Joshi of corruption and sentenced him with a jail term of one and a half years and Rs 21.61 million fine and the same amount as compensation to the state through the confiscation of property. The Supreme Court is hearing on an appeal by former minister and Nepali Congress leader Govinda Raj Joshi who had challenged a Special Court verdict convicting him of corruption two years ago.

== Imprisonment ==
- Imprisoned under security act -1967
- Imprisoned under sangh sanstha control act:-1970
- Imprisoned under Rajkaj Apradh Ain -1978.
- Imprisoned under Security Act -1970 in Referendum Movement.
- Imprisoned under security Act in Non-violence Movement in 1985.
- Imprisoned under security Act in people's Movement for the Restoration of Democracy -1990.

== Public career 1960 to 1980 ==
- Actively Participated in the movement for the restoration of Democracy during Panchayat regime.
- President - Independent Students' Union, Education Campus Kirtipur T. U.-1966.
- President - Gandaki Students Union Kathmandu -1967
- Founder Headmaster -Tribhuwana Secondary School Manechauka Tanhun -1968 -1978.
- Head Master -Shiva Secondary School Rising Tanhun1979 - 1980.
- District Member Tarun Dal Tanhun -1969 -1976.
- Secretary - Multi-Party System Prachar Samiti Tanahun 1970.
- President Nepal Bar Association, Tanhun -1979 -1980.
- Vice President Nepal Bar Association Western Regional Court 1980.
- President Amnesty International Group 13 Tanhun and Executive

== Public career 1980 to 1990 ==
- member of Nepali Congress 1988 -1990.
- Secretary Nepali Congress Tanhun District 1976 -1987.
- Founder - Adikavi Bhanu Bhakta Multiple Campus Tanahun -1985 and Volunteer Lecturer for two year
- M .P . from constituency No 2, Tanahun in 1991 and Chief Whip Nepali Congress Parliamentary Party -1991

== Public career 1990 to 2000 ==
- Minister for Education Culture and Social welfare -DEC 1991.
- Chairman, Social Welfare Council Nepal -1991
- Chairman, Nepal Sports Council -1991.
- Chairman Nepal Olympic Committee -1991.
- Chairman, Nepal Section UNESCO -1991
- Chairman, Non -Formal Education Council Nepal -1992
- Chairman, Special Education Council - 1991.
- Chairman, Education Reform Committee - 1991.
- Chairman, Lumbini Development Trust -1991
- Vice Chairman, Pasupati Development Trust - 1991
- Pro-Chancellor, Tribhuwana University Kathmandu 1991
- Pro -chancellor, Kathmandu University -1991
- Pro-Chancellor, Mahendra Sanskrit University, 1991
- Pro-Chancellor, Royal Nepal Academy of Science and Technology, -1991
- Pro-Chancellor -Royal Nepal Academy, Nepal -1991.
- Chief Scout, Nepal Scout 1994.
- Chairman, Council for Technical and Vocational Education - 1991.
- Chairman Higher Secondary Education Board 1991.
- M. P. Elected 2nd time from Constituency No 1 Tanahun.
- Elected Secretary in Nepali Congress Parliamentary Party -1995.
- Member - Nepali Congress National Council -1992.
- Second Time Minister for education in -- - 1995.
- Home Minister--- 1998 (Minister for third time)
- Minister For Home & Home Minister & General Administrative—1999
- M.P. Elected 3rd time from Constituency No. 1., Tanahun District.
- Minister For Water Resource --- May 1999
- Chairman Of Water & Energy Commission.
- Vice Chairman of National Water Resource Development Council.
- Executive Member - Nepali Congress central working committee- 1998

== Public career 2000 to current ==
- Minister for Home Affairs – 2000
- Minister for Local Development, Culture, Tourism & Civil Aviation – 2001
- Elected Executive Member - Nepali Congress central working committee - 2000
- Joint -General Secretary of Nepali congress Central Working Committee – 2001, Sept.

== Books and booklets ==
- Mera Anubhatiharu Part one
- Mera Anubhatiharu Part Two
- Mera Anubhatiharu Part Three
- Sabdachitrama Nepal
- Nepali Congress (Bigat, Bartaman ra Bhabisya)
- Nepalma Shanghiya Shasan Pranali)

== Participation ==
- National Level meeting organized by Nepali Congress, Nepal Bar Association, and Amnesty International
- South Asian Ministerial Conference on Challenges women in the 1990s India - 1992.
- South Asian Ministerial Level Conference on children, Shree Lanka.- 1993
- Ministerial Conference of Ministers and those Responsible for Economic Planning Asia Pacific Malaysia -1993.
- Head of Delegation UNESCO General Assembly Peris 1993 and 1996
- SAARC Ministerial Meeting on disabled in Pakistan -1994

== Sources ==
- Parliamentary List
- Govinda Raj Joshi Personal Web site
