= Mongol National Organisation =

Political party in Nepal

Mongol National Organisation मंगोल नेशनल अर्गनाइजेशन
- Leader: Gopal Gurung
- Founded: Jan 1, 1989 Bhadragol Jail
- Headquarters: Kathmandu

Election symbol

Website
- https://mnodgg.org

The Mongol National Organisation is a political party in Nepal. In contrast to different Mulbaasi movements, MNO emphasizes racial identity rather than ethnicity. MNO rejects the term 'janajati'.

The party was denied registration in 1990. Albeit unregistered, the party launched independent candidates in the 1991, 1994 and 1999 parliamentary elections in Ilam and Jhapa Districts. None were elected. The party was registered with the Election Commission of Nepal ahead of the 2008 Constituent Assembly election. In the 2008 CA polls, the party got 11,578 votes (0.11%) in the proportional representation vote.

Whilst unsuccessful in national elections, the party, as of 2007, had won village level seats in Ilam District.

== Electoral performance ==
Election	Leader	Votes		Seats	Position	Resulting government
Election	Leader	No.	%	No.	Position	Resulting government
2008	Gopal Gurung	11,578	0.11	0 / 575	29th	Extra-parliamentary
2013	Gopal Gurung	8,215	0.09	0 / 575	48th	Extra-parliamentary
2017	Budhhalal Meche	15,117	0.16	0 / 275	19th	Extra-parliamentary
2022	Budhhalal Meche	49,000	0.46	0 / 275	13th	Extra-parliamentary
