= List of members elected in the 2013 Nepalese Constituent Assembly election =

2nd Constituent Assembly of Nepal (until 2015) Legislature Parliament of Nepal (from 2015)
←	1st CA	5th HoR	→
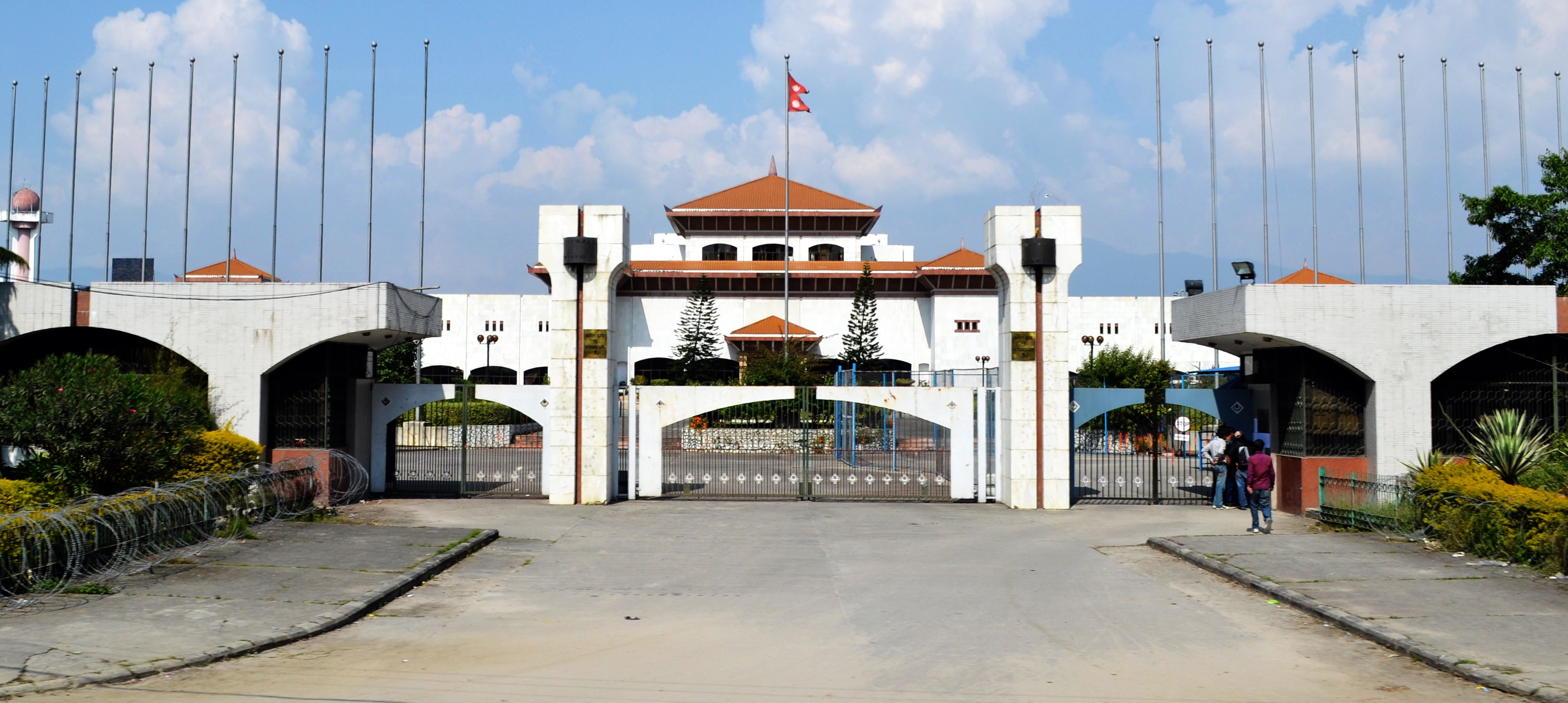
- International Convention Centre, Nepal

Overview
- Legislative body: Constituent Assembly
- Jurisdiction: Nepal
- Meeting place: International Convention Centre, Nepal
- Term: 21 January 2014 – 14 October 2017
- Election: 2013 Constituent Assembly election
- Government: Sushil Koirla cabinet First Oli cabinet Second Dahal cabinet Fourth Deuba cabinet

Constituent Assembly
- Members: 601
- Chairperson: Subas Chandra Nemwang (UML) (until September 2015)
- Deputy Chairperson: Onsari Gharti Magar (Maoist) (until September 2015)
- Speaker: Onsari Gharti Magar (Maoist) (from October 2015)
- Prime Minister: Sushil Koirala (NC); K. P. Sharma Oli (UML); Pushpa Kamal Dahal (Maoist); Sher Bahadur Deuba (NC)

This is a list of members elected to the 2nd Nepalese Constituent Assembly at the 2013 Nepalese Constituent Assembly election and subsequent by-elections.

The list is arranged by constituency for members elected through direct elections and by last name for members elected through the party list. Subas Chandra Nemwang served as Chairman of the Constituent Assembly and Onsari Gharti Magar served as the Speaker of the Legislature Parliament. Sushil Koirala, K. P. Sharma Oli, Pushpa Kamal Dahal and Sher Bahadur Deuba served as prime ministers during the term of the parliament.

== Constituent Assembly composition ==
2nd Constituent Assembly of Nepal

Legislature Parliament at dissolution in 2017

Constituent Assembly at start of term

Party	Members		
Party	After election	At dissolution	Change
Nepali Congress	206	207	▲1
CPN (Unified Marxist–Leninist)	184	182	▼2
CPN (Maoist Centre) (Note: UCPN (Maoist) renamed to CPN (Maoist Centre) in April 2016)	83	82	▼1
Rastriya Janata Party Nepal	—	25	▲25
Rastriya Prajatantra Party (Democratic)	—	20	▲20
Nepal Loktantrik Forum (Note: Madheshi Janaadhikar Forum, Nepal (Democratic) renamed to Nepal Lokantrik Forum after merger with Rastriya Janamukti Party (Democratic) and Dalit Janajati Party)	14	18	▲4
Rastriya Prajatantra Party	13	17	▲4
Federal Socialist Forum, Nepal	—	15	▲15
CPN (Marxist–Leninist)	5	5	Steady
Nepal Majdoor Kisan Party	4	4	Steady
Rastriya Janamorcha	3	3	Steady
CPN (United)	3	3	Steady
Nepal Pariwar Dal	2	2	Steady
Akhanda Nepal Party	1	1	Steady
Bahujan Shakti Party	—	1	▲1
Boudhhik Janatantrik Parishad	—	1	▲1
Jana Jagaran Party Nepal	1	1	Steady
Khambuwan Rashtriya Morcha, Nepal	1	1	Steady
Madhesh Samata Party Nepal	1	1	Steady
Naya Shakti Party, Nepal	—	1	▲1
Nepali Janata Dal	1	1	Steady
Samajbadi Janata Party	1	1	Steady
Sanghiya Loktantrik Rastriya Manch (Tharuhat)	1	1	Steady
Independents	3	2	▼1
Rastriya Prajatantra Party Nepal	25	—	▼25
Terai Madhesh Loktantrik Party	11	—	▼11
Madheshi Janaadhikar Forum, Nepal	10	—	▼10
Sadbhavana Party	6	—	▼6
Federal Socialist Party, Nepal	5	—	▼5
Rastriya Madhesh Samajbadi Party	3	—	▼3
Terai Madhesh Sadbhavana Party	3	—	▼3
Dalit Janajati Party	2	—	▼2
Rastriya Janamukti Party	2	—	▼2
Tharuhat Terai Party Nepal	2	—	▼2
Madheshi Janaadhikar Forum (Republican)	1	—	▼1
Nepa Rastriya Party	1	—	▼1
Sanghiya Sadbhawana Party	1	—	▼1
Vacant	2	6	▲5
Total	601	601	

== List of members elected by party ==
Nepali Congress
Directly elected
Constituency	Member
Panchthar 2	Bhishma Raj Angdembe
Ilam 3	Keshav Thapa
Jhapa 2	Sudhir Kumar Siwakoti
Jhapa 3	Krishna Prasad Sitaula
Jhapa 5	Keshav Kumar Budhathoki
Sankhuwasabha 1	Tara Man Gurung
Sankhuwasabha 2	Dipak Khadka
Morang 3	Dilip Khawas Gachhadar
Morang 5	Amrit Kumar Aryal
Morang 6	Mahesh Acharya
Morang 7	Shekhar Koirala
Morang 8	Dig Bahadur Limbu
Sunsari 4	Sitaram Mahato
Solukhumbu 1	Bal Bahadur K.C.
Okhaldhunga 2	Ram Hari Khatiwada
Udayapur 1	Narayan Khadka
Udayapur 3	Narayan Bahadur Karki
Saptari 5	Teju Lal Chaudhary
Saptari 6	Surendra Prasad Yadav
Siraha 1	Padma Narayan Chaudhary
Siraha 4	Ramchandra Yadav
Siraha 6	Ganesh Kumar Mandal
Siraha 3	Sita Devi Yadav
Ramechhap 1	Aang Tawa Sherpa
Sindhuli 2	Mohan Prasad Baral
Dhanusha 1	Dinesh Prasad Parsaila Yadav
Dhanusha 2	Ram Krishna Yadav
Dhanusha 3	Bimalendra Nidhi
Dhanusha 5	Chandra Mohan Yadav
Dhanusha 6	Prem Kishor Prasad Sah Teli
Mahottari 2	Kiran Yadav
Mahottari 6	Sitaram Bhandari
Sarlahi 2	Ram Chandra Chaudhary
Sarlahi 6	Amresh Kumar Singh
Nuwakot 1	Arjun Narsingh K.C.
Nuwakot 2	Dr. Ram Sharan Mahat
Nuwakot 3	Bahadur Singh Lama
Kathmandu 1	Prakash Man Singh
Kathmandu 2	Dipak Prasad Kuikel
Kathmandu 4	Gagan Kumar Thapa
Kathmandu 5	Narhari Acharya
Kathmandu 6	Bhimsen Das Pradhan
Kathmandu 8	Nabindra Raj Joshi
Kathmandu 9	Dhyan Govinda Ranjit
Kathmandu 10	Rajendra Kumar K.C.
Lalitpur 1	Udaya Shamsher JBR
Lalitpur 2	Chandra Maharjan
Lalitpur 3	Madan Bahadur Amatya
Bhaktapur 2	Rameshwar Prasad Dhungel
Kavrepalanchok 1	Tirtha Bahadur Lama
Kavrepalanchok 3	Kanchan Chandra Bade
Sindhupalchok 1	Mohan Bahadur Basnet
Makwanpur 1	Indra Bahadur Baniya
Rautahat 5	Sunil Kumar Yadav
Bara 1	Ram Ayodhya Prasad Yadav
Bara 2	Radhe Chandra Yadav
Bara 3	Farmullah Mansoor
Parsa 1	Rajendra Amatya
Parsa 4	Surendra Prasad Chaudhary
Chitwan 2	Shesh Nath Adhikari
Chitwan 4	Ram Krishna Ghimire
Manang 1	Tek Bahadur Gurung
Kaski 1	Yagya Bahadur Thapa
Kaski 2	Sharada Paudel
Lamjung 2	Chandra Bahadur Kunwar
Tanahun 1	Shankar Bhandari
Tanahun 2	Ram Chandra Paudel
Syangja 1	Raju Thapa
Syangja 2	Kamal Prasad Pangeni
Gulmi 1	Krishna Bahadur Chhantyal Thapa
Gulmi 2	Chandra Kanta Bhandari
Palpa 3	Hari Prasad Nepal
Nawalparasi 1	Shashank Koirala
Nawalparasi 5	Bikram Khanal
Nawalparasi 6	Dev Karan Prasad Kalvar
Rupandehi 1	Abdul Razaq Gaddi
Rupandehi 3	Bal Krishna Khand
Rupandehi 5	Bharat Kumar Shah
Kapilvastu 2	Atahar Kamal Musalman
Kapilvastu 4	Surendra Raj Acharya
Mustang 1	Romy Gauchan Thakali
Baglung 1	Champa Devi Khadka
Baglung 2	Prakash Sharma Paudel
Baglung 3	Gyan Kumar Chhantyal
Parbat 1	Arjun Prasad Joshi
Dang 1	Parbata D.C. Chaudhary
Dang 2	Sushila Chaudhary
Dang 3	Raju Khanal
Dang 4	Buddhiram Bhandari
Dang 5	Deepak Giri
Jajarkot 2	Rajeev Bikram Shah
Surkhet 1	Purna Bahadur Khadka
Surkhet 2	Hridaya Ram Thani
Surkhet 3	Tapta Bahadur Bista
Bardiya 2	Sanjay Kumar Gautam
Humla 1	Jiwan Bahadur Shahi
Jumla 1	Lalit Jang Shahi
Doti 1	Bir Bahadur Balayar
Kailali 5	Dirgha Raj Bhatta
Kaiali 6	Pushkar Nath Ojha
Baitadi 2	Nar Bahadur Chand
Dadeldhura 1	Sher Bahadur Deuba
Kanchanpur 1	Diwan Singh Bista
Kanchanpur 2	Narayan Prakash Saud
Kanchanpur 3	Bahadur Singh Thapa
Kanchanpur 4	Ramesh Lekhak
Party list
	Mukhtar Ahmed
	Binda Devi Ale
	Jhul Bahadur Ale
	Asha B.K.
	Saraswati Bajumaya
	Maiku Lal Balmiki
	Ambika Basnet
	Khadga Bahadur Basyal
	Laxmi Devi Bhandari
	Man Mohan Bhattarai
	Lal Babu Singh Bhuihar
	Ganesh Prasad Bimali
	Man Bahadur Bishwakarma
	Min Bahadur Bishwakarma
	Bal Dev Bohora
	Tarini Dutta Chataut
	Buddhi Sagar Chaudhary
	Dilli Bahadur Chaudhary
	Sabitri Devi Chaudhary
	Shanti Devi Chaudhary
	Pramila Devi Das
	Dr. Arju Rana Deuba
	Anita Devkota
	Dipshikha Sharma Dhakal
	Ananda Prasad Dhungana
	Lal Bahadur Ghale
	Dil Bahadur Gharti
	Pradeep Giri
	Dhanraj Gurung
	Kul Bahadur Gurung
	Sita Gurung
	Suryaman Gurung
	Usha Gurung
	Sarwat Aara Khaman Halwaini
	Minakshi Jha
	Chandra Devi Joshi
	Om Devi Malla Joshi
	Subarna Jwarchan
	Jagadiswor Narsingh KC
	Narbhan Kami
	Gyanendra Bahadur Karki
	Ranjit Karna
	Bharat Bahadur Khadka
	Bhotani Devi Khawas
	Ashok Koirala
	Lila Koirala
	Sujata Koirala
	Badshah Kurmi
	Pushpalata Lama
	Mahendra Kumar Limbu
	Prakash Sharan Mahat
	Haresh Prasad Mahato
	Mithu Malla
	Sangita Mandal (Dhanuk)
	Narendra Bikram Nemwang
	Ishwari Neupane
	Dilman Pakhrin
	Badri Prasad Pandey
	Kamala Panta
	Bishnu Maya Pariyar
	Jiwan Pariyar
	Sujata Pariyar
	Ram Chandra Pokharel
	Sarita Prasain
	Amar Singh Pun
	Kumari Laxmi Rai
	Mohan Kumar Rai
	Amrit Lal Rajbanshi
	Pyare Lal Rana
	Minendra Prasad Rijal
	Kabita Kumari Sardar
	Kaushar Shah
	Rita Shahi
	Shila Sharma
	Ratna Sherchan
	Anjani Shrestha
	Chin Kaji Shrestha
	Gopal Man Shrestha
	Manohar Narayan Shrestha
	Rajya Laxmi Shrestha
	Abdul Hamid Siddhiqi
	Kalpana Sob
	Anjana Tamli
	Rashmi Thakur
	Madhu Shahi Thakuri
	Malaxmi Upadhyaya
	Dhruba Wagle
	Amiya Kumar Yadav
	Chitra Lekha Yadav
	Mahendra Yadav
	Mukta Kumari Yadav
Nominated
Anil Kumar Rungata
Umesh Shrestha
Gita Wagle
Nagendra Kumar Kumal
Pushkar Acharya
Radheshyam Adhikari
Resham Bahadur Baniya
Shiva Bahadur Khadka
Sakaldev Sutihar
Suryadev Das Urab

CPN (Unified Marxist–Lenninist)
Directly elected
Constituency	Member
Taplejung 1	Bhupendra Thebe
Taplejung 2	Dambar Dhoj Tumbahamphe
Panchthar 1	Ganesh Kumar Kambang
Ilam 1	Jhala Nath Khanal
Ilam 2	Subas Chandra Nemwang
Jhapa 1	Rabin Koirala
Jhapa 4	Prem Bahadur Giri
Jhapa 6	Dipak Karki
Jhapa 7	K. P. Sharma Oli
Tehrathum 1	Bhawani Prasad Khapung
Bhojpur 1	Kripasur Sherpa
Bhojpur 2	Sher Dhan Rai
Dhankuta 1	Tika Ram Chemjong Limbu
Morang 1	Rishikesh Pokharel
Morang 2	Chandi Prasad Rai
Morang 8	Chandra Bahadur Gurung
Sunsari 1	Krishna Kumar Rai
Sunsari 2	Rewati Raman Bhandari
Sunsari 6	Bhim Prasad Acharya
Khotang 1	Panchakarna Rai
Khotang 2	Bishal Bhattarai
Okhaldhunga 1	Yagya Raj Sunuwar
Udayapur 2	Manju Kumari Chaudhary
Saptari 4	Tara Kanta Chaudhary
Siraha 2	Ram Chandra Yadav
Dolakha 1	Parbat Gurung
Sindhuli 1	Ganesh Kumar Pahadi
Dhanusha 7	Shatrudhan Mahato
Mahottari 3	Ram Dayal Mandal
Mahottari 5	Dip Narayan Sah
Sarlahi 3	Hari Prasad Upreti
Rasuwa 1	Janardan Dhakal
Dhading 1	Dhan Bahadur Ghale
Dhading 2	Guru Prasad Burlakoti
Dhading 3	Rajendra Prasad Pandey
Kathmandu 3	Rameshwar Phuyal
Kathmandu 7	Ram Bir Manandhar
Kavrepalanchok 2	Ram Hari Subedi
Kavrepalanchok 4	Bidur Prasad Sapkota
Sindhupalchok 3	Sher Bahadur Tamang
Makwanpur 2	Subhas Chandra Shahi Thakuri
Makwanpur 3	Ananta Prasad Paudel
Makwanpur 4	Raja Ram Syangtan
Rautahat 1	Madhav Kumar Nepal
Rautahat 6	Ram Kumar Bhattarai
Bara 4	Nezma Alam
Bara 5	Balbir Prasad Chaudhary
Bara 6	Purushottam Paudel
Parsa 5	Jay Prakash Tharu
Parsa 2	Bichari Prasad Yadav
Parsa 3	Raj Kumar Gupta
Chitwan 1	Surendra Prasad Pandey
Chitwan 3	Krishna Bhakta Pokharel
Kaski 3	Rabindra Prasad Adhikari
Kaski 4	Sita Giri (Oli)
Lamjung 1	Jamindraman Ghale
Tanahun 3	Tuk Raj Sigdel
Syangja 3	Mukti Prasad Pathak
Gulmi 3	Gokarna Raj Bista
Arghakhanchi 2	Duman Singh Thapa Chhetri
Palpa 1	Radha Krishna Kadel
Palpa 2	Som Prasad Pandey
Nawalparasi 2	Jiwan Shrestha
Nawalparasi 3	Krishna Prasad Paudel
Nawalparasi 4	Baijanath Chaudhary
Rupandehi 4	Bishnu Prasad Paudel
Kapilvastu 1	Balaram Adhikari
Myagdi 1	Navaraj Sharma
Parbat 2	Bikash Lamsal
Pyuthan 1	Bam Dev Gautam
Pyuthan 2	Hira Bahadur K.C.
Salyan 2	Prakash Jwala
Dailekh 1	Amar Bahadur Thapa
Dailekh 2	Laxmi Prasad Pokharel
Dailekh 3	Ananda Prasad Pokharel
Banke 1	Dev Raj Bhar
Banke 2	Dinesh Chandra Yadav
Banke 4	Dal Bahadur Sunar
Bardiya 1	Shyam Prasad Dhakal
Dolpa 1	Dhan Bahadur Budha
Mugu 1	Mohan Baniya
Bajura 1	Karna Bahadur Thapa
Bajhang 1	Man Prasad Khatri
Bajhang 2	Lal Bahadur Rawal
Achham 2	Bharat Saud
Achham 1	Bhim Bahadur Rawal
Doti 2	Prem Bahadur Ale
Kailali 2	Mohan Singh Rathore
Darchula 1	Ganesh Singh Thagunna
Baitadi 1	Damodar Bhandari
Party list
	Bharat Mohan Adhikari
	Bhisma Nath Adhikari
	Kashi Nath Adhikari
	Junaid Ansari
	Keshav Prasad Badal
	Prabha Devi Bajracharya
	Bidhya Devi Bhandari
	Gyan Bahadur Bhujel
	Sharada Kumar Bishwakarma
	Tula Raj Bista
	Amrit Kumar Bohora
	Sindhu Jalesa Budhathoki
	Bishwam Prasad Chaudhary
	Rabani Chaudhary
	Pashupati Chaulagai
	Dulari Devi
	Bhanu Bhakta Dhakal
	Gyani Devi Gaire
	Jit Bahadur Darji Gautam
	Man Kumar Gautam
	Gokul Prasad Gharti
	Jiwan Kumari Ghimire
	Kamala Kumari Ghimire
	Mamata Giri
	Rajlaxmi Golchha
	Ganesh Man Gurung
	Ratna Devi Gurung
	Tul Bahadur Gurung
	Yuvraj Gyawali
	Tula Bhadra Hamal
	Chudamani B.K. Jangali
	Ranju Kumari Jha
	Shital Jha
	Kalpana Sharma Joshi
	Aditya Narayan Kasaudhan
	Pemba Lama
	Mahin Limbu
	Lila Magar
	Nar Bahadur Thapa Magar
	Nardevi Pun Magar
	Bal Bahadur Mahat
	Kamala Devi Mahato
	Shanta Manawi
	Satya Naraya Mandal
	Dr. Bamshidhar Mishra
	Anarkali Miya
	Shiva Kumar Gotame Nagarkoti
	Susila Nepal
	Bhagat Nepali
	Teku Nepali
	Gauri Kumari Oli
	Ram Awatar Paswan
	Sabiya Prabin
	Gaura Prasai
	Dilshobha Pun
	Harka Bol Rai
	Jayanti Devi Rai
	Tara Devi Rai
	Ambika Khawas Rajbanshi
	Hari Bahadur Rajbanshi
	Shantula Rajbhandari
	Kripa Ram Rana
	Rita Rawal
	Dhan Bahadur Rayamajhi
	Basundhara Rokaya
	Dharmanath Prasad Sah
	Kedar Prasad Sanjel
	Ranjana Kumari Sarkar
	Madan Kumari Shah
	Asta Laxmi Shakya
	Mahendra Sherchan
	Binod Shrestha
	Ranjana Shrestha
	Siddhi Lal Singh
	Nirmal Prakash Subedi
	Chhebang Tenzen Tamang
	Ichha Raj Tamang
	Ram Chandra Sah Teli
	Shrimaya Thakali
	Nagendra Prasad Tharu
	Ganga Lal Tuladhar
	Afilal Ukheda
	Asha Yadav
	Mina Devi Yadav
Nominated
Agni Prasad Kharel
Udaya Nepali Shrestha
Ganga Devi Dangi
Naresh Kharel
Partaman Dhimal
Pemba Gurung
Mira Pokharel
Rajan Bhattarai
Lalbabu Prasad Yadav

CPN (Maoist Centre)
Directly elected
Constituency	Member
Morang 4	Shiva Kumar Mandal
Saptari 1	Manpur Chaudhary
Saptari 2	Ashok Kumar Mandal
Saptari 3	Umesh Kumar Yadav
Siraha 5	Pushpa Kamal Dahal
Ramechhap 2	Shyam Kumar Shrestha
Sindhuli 3	Haribol Prasad Gajurel
Mahottari 1	Giriraj Mani Pokharel
Sarlahi 1	Shambhu Lal Shrestha
Sindhupalchok 2	Agni Prasad Sapkota
Rautahat 3	Prabhu Sah
Rautahat 4	Satya Narayan Bhagat
Gorkha 2	Hit Raj Pandey
Gorkha 3	Chham Bahadur Gurung
Arghakhanchi 1	Top Bahadur Rayamajhi
Rukum 1	Ganeshman Pun
Rukum 2	Janardan Sharma
Rolpa 1	Krishna Bahadur Mahara
Rolpa 2	Onsari Gharti
Salyan 1	Tek Bahadur Basnet
Jajarkot 1	Shakti Bahadur Basnet
Bardiya 3	Santa Kumar Tharu
Bardiya 4	Man Bahadur Tharu
Kalikot 1	Mahendra Bahadur Shahi
Kailali 4	Gauri Shankar Chaudhary
Party list
	Usha Kiran Ansari
	Karna Bahadur B.K.
	Bed Maya Bhandari
	Ram Narayan Bidari
	Dhan Maya Bishwakarma
	Anjana Chaudhary
	Santa Kumar Darai
	Fuljhari Devi
	Dilmaya Dhami
	Krishna Dhital
	Kamala Dong
	Yogendra Tamang Ghising
	Gopal Guru
	Lal Bahadur Gurung
	Hari Lal Gyawali
	Dulari Harijan
	Mohammad Zakir Hussein
	Shri Prasad Jabegu
	Surendra Prasad Jaiswal
	Surendra Kumar Karki
	Juth Bahadur Tuhure Khadgi
	Sirjana Taramu Khatri
	Durga Khuna
	Asha Koirala
	Goma Kunwar
	Lharkyal Lama
	Keshari Gharti Magar
	Rupa Maharjan
	Lalendra Kumar Mandal
	Amal Lal Modi
	Pratikshya Tiwari Mukhiya
	Ajay Shankar Nayak
	Sita Nepali
	Dhana Pahari
	Bhakti Prasad Pandey
	Anita Kumari Pariya
	Dhaniram Paudel
	Tej Kumari Poudel
	Surya Prakash Bala Rai
	Tulasa Rana
	Bhesh Kumari Raut
	Janaki Kumari Saud Rawal
	Lalita Kumari Regmi
	Nisha Kumari Sah
	Rabindra Pratap Shah
	Rekha Sharma
	Ongdi Sherpa
	Daljit B.K. Shripali
	Radhika Tamang
	Punaram Thapa
	Mohan Tudu
	Dor Prasad Upadhyaya
	Ram Singh Yadav
	Soniya Yadav
Nominated
Ram Maya Bogati
Janak Bahadur Budha
Janak Raj Joshi

Rastriya Janata Party Nepal
Directly elected
Constituency	Member
Sarlahi 4	Mahindra Ray Yadav
Sarlahi 5	Jangi Lal Raya
Dhanusha 4	Sanjay Kumar Sah
Rupandehi 6	Sarbendra Nath Shukla
Rupandehi 7	Kamaleshwar Puri Goswami
Kapilvastu 3	Brijesh Kumar Gupta
Party list
	Kedar Nandan Chaudhary
	Mina Chaudhary
	Nar Singh Chaudhary
	Shaila Kumari Devi
	Raj Kumari Gaderiya
	Dimpal Kumari Jha
	Indra Jha
	Narendra Sah Kalwar
	Laxman Lal Karna
	Bimal Kumar Kediya
	America Kumari
	Ramesh Prasad Kurmi
	Nirjala Raut
	Dinesh Prasad Sah
	Madhawani Rani Sah
	Iqbal Ahmed Shah
	Bijay Kumar Singh
	Dharmendra Kumar Sah Teli
	Sarita Kumari Yadav

Rastriya Prajatantra Party (Democratic)
Directly elected
Constituency	Member
Dhankuta 2	Sunil Bahadur Thapa
Chitwan 5	Bikram Pandey
Rupandehi 2	Deepak Bohara
Party list
	Shayandra Bantawa
	Biraj Bista
	Rajeshwari Devi
	Ishtiyak Ahmed Khan
	Ramesh Kumar Lama
	Resham Bahadur Lama
	Babina Moktan Lawati
	Sita Luitel
	Dhano Mahara
	Anandi Panta
	Laxmi Thapa Paswan
	Kamala Devi Sharma
	Saroj Sharma
	Lila Devi Shrestha
	Rajya Laxmi Shrestha
	Gita Singh
	Ram Kumar Subba

Nepal Loktantrik Forum
Directly elected
Constituency	Member
Sunsari 3	Bijay Kumar Gachhadar
Rautahat 2	Mohammad Mustaq Alam
Kailali 1	Janak Raj Chaudhary
Kailali 3	Ram Janam Chaudhary
Party list
	Sima Kumari B.K.
	Asha Chaturdevi
	Kalpana Chaudhary
	Yogendra Chaudhary
	Gita Chhetri
	Gopal Dahit
	Jitendra Narayan Dev
	Yashoda Kumari Lama
	Dr. Baburam Pokharel
	Dr. Subodh Kumar Pokharel
	Ramani Ram
	Pawan Kumar Sharada
	Shiva Lal Thapa
	Sumitra Tharuni

Rastriya Prajatanta Party
Party list
Raj Kumar Agrawal
Bhaskar Bhadra
Kanta Bhattarai
Bhakta Bahadur Bishwakarma
Jayanta Chand
Ram Dulari Chaudhary
Dil Nath Giri
Shrikanti Pasi
Kunti Kumari Shahi
Dinesh Shrestha
Sushil Kumar Shrestha
Parshuram Tamang
Bikram Bahadur Thapa
Kamal Thapa
Shyam Sundar Tibdebal
Ganga Prasad Yadav
Nominated
Ganesh Thapa

Federal Socialist Forum, Nepal
Directly elected
Constituency	Member
Sunsari 5	Upendra Yadav
Kapilvastu 5	Abhishek Pratap Shah
Party list
	Shrawan Kumar Agrawal
	Laxmi Kumari Chaudhary
	Jagatun Nisa Dhuniya
	Birendra Prasad Mahato
	Dil Bahadur Nepali
	Chhaya Sharma Panta
	Ashok Kumar Rai
	Lalbabu Raut
	Urmila Devi Shah
	Kashim Ali Siddhiqi
	Radha Devi Timilsina
	Shivaji Yadav
	Usha Yadav

CPN (Marxist–Leninist)
Party list
Kamala Bishwakarma
Shiva Chandra Chaudahry
Kalasa Devi Mahara
Chandra Prakash Mainali
Aindra Sunar Nemwang

Nepal Majdoor Kisan Party
Directly elected
Constituency	Member
Bhaktapur 1	Narayan Man Bijukchhe
Party list
	Dilli Prasad Kafle
	Anuradha Thapa Magar
	Prem Suwal

CPN (United)
Party list
Mithila Chaudhary
Jay Dev Joshi
Pramila Rana

Rastriya Janamorcha
Party list
Chitra Bahadur K.C.
Durga Paudel
Mina Pun

Nepal Parivar Dal
Party list
Ek Nath Dhakal
Milan Kumari Rajbanshi

Akhanda Nepal Party
Party list
Kumar Khadka

Bahujan Shakti Party
Party list
Vishwendra Paswan

Boudhhik Janatantrik Parishad
Party list
Laxman Rajbanshi

Janagaran Party Nepal
Party list
Lok Mani Dhakal

Khambuwan Rastriya Morcha, Nepal
Party list
Ram Kumar Rai

Madhesh Samata Party Nepal
Party list
Meghraj Nepali

Naya Shakti Party, Nepal
Party list
Ganga Chaudhary Satgauwa

Nepali Janata Dal
Party list
Hari Charan Sah

Samajbadi Janata Party
Party list
Prem Bahadur Singh

Sanghiya Loktantrik Rastriya Manch (Tharuhat)
Party list
Rukmini Chaudhary

Independents
Directly elected
Constituency	Member
Mahottari 4	Chandeshwar Jha
Nominated
	Shyam Kumar Shrestha

== Party changes or defections ==
Constituency/PR group	Member	From	To	Date
	Vishwendra Paswan	Dalit Janajati Party	Bahujan Shakti Party	
	Dr. Dimpal Kumari Jha	Sanghiya Sadbhavana Party	Nepal Sadbhawana Party	2 March 2015
	Sima Kumari B.K.	Rastriya Janamukti Party	Rastriya Janamukti Party (Democratic)	3 March 2015
	Shiva Lal Thapa	Rastriya Janamukti Party	Rastriya Janamukti Party (Democratic)	3 March 2015
Kapilvastu 5	Abhishek Pratap Shah	Madheshi Jannadhikar Forum, Nepal	Federal Socialist Forum, Nepal	15 June 2015
Sunsari 5	Upendra Yadav	Madheshi Jannadhikar Forum, Nepal	Federal Socialist Forum, Nepal	15 June 2015
	Shrawan Kumar Agrawal	Madheshi Jannadhikar Forum, Nepal	Federal Socialist Forum, Nepal	15 June 2015
	Laxmi Kumari Chaudhary	Madheshi Jannadhikar Forum, Nepal	Federal Socialist Forum, Nepal	15 June 2015
	Jagatun Nisa Dhuniya	Madheshi Jannadhikar Forum, Nepal	Federal Socialist Forum, Nepal	15 June 2015
	Birendra Prasad Mahato	Madheshi Jannadhikar Forum, Nepal	Federal Socialist Forum, Nepal	15 June 2015
	Chhaya Sharma Panta	Madheshi Jannadhikar Forum, Nepal	Federal Socialist Forum, Nepal	15 June 2015
	Lalbabu Raut	Madheshi Jannadhikar Forum, Nepal	Federal Socialist Forum, Nepal	15 June 2015
	Shivaji Yadav	Madheshi Jannadhikar Forum, Nepal	Federal Socialist Forum, Nepal	15 June 2015
	Usha Yadav	Madheshi Jannadhikar Forum, Nepal	Federal Socialist Forum, Nepal	15 June 2015
	Dil Bahadur Nepali	Federal Socialist Party, Nepal	Federal Socialist Forum, Nepal	15 June 2015
	Ashok Kumar Rai	Federal Socialist Party, Nepal	Federal Socialist Forum, Nepal	15 June 2015
	Urmila Devi Shah	Federal Socialist Party, Nepal	Federal Socialist Forum, Nepal	15 June 2015
	Kashim Ali Siddhiqi	Federal Socialist Party, Nepal	Federal Socialist Forum, Nepal	15 June 2015
	Radha Devi Timilsina	Federal Socialist Party, Nepal	Federal Socialist Forum, Nepal	15 June 2015
Kapilvastu 2	Atahar Kamal Musalman	Independent	Nepali Congress	5 April 2016
	Raj Kumar Agrawal	Rastriya Prajatantra Party Nepal	Rastriya Prajatantra Party	21 November 2016
	Shayanra Bantawa	Rastriya Prajatantra Party Nepal	Rastriya Prajatantra Party	21 November 2016
	Bhaskar Bhadra	Rastriya Prajatantra Party Nepal	Rastriya Prajatantra Party	21 November 2016
	Kanta Bhattarai	Rastriya Prajatantra Party Nepal	Rastriya Prajatantra Party	21 November 2016
	Bhakta Bahadur Bishwakarma	Rastriya Prajatantra Party Nepal	Rastriya Prajatantra Party	21 November 2016
	Biraj Bista	Rastriya Prajatantra Party Nepal	Rastriya Prajatantra Party	21 November 2016
	Ram Dulari Chaudhary	Rastriya Prajatantra Party Nepal	Rastriya Prajatantra Party	21 November 2016
	Rajeshwari Devi	Rastriya Prajatantra Party Nepal	Rastriya Prajatantra Party	21 November 2016
	Dil Nath Giri	Rastriya Prajatantra Party Nepal	Rastriya Prajatantra Party	21 November 2016
	Resham Bahadur Lama	Rastriya Prajatantra Party Nepal	Rastriya Prajatantra Party	21 November 2016
	Babina Moktan Lawati	Rastriya Prajatantra Party Nepal	Rastriya Prajatantra Party	21 November 2016
	Sita Luitel	Rastriya Prajatantra Party Nepal	Rastriya Prajatantra Party	21 November 2016
	Dhano Mahara	Rastriya Prajatantra Party Nepal	Rastriya Prajatantra Party	21 November 2016
	Shrikanti Pasi	Rastriya Prajatantra Party Nepal	Rastriya Prajatantra Party	21 November 2016
	Kunti Kumari Shahi	Rastriya Prajatantra Party Nepal	Rastriya Prajatantra Party	21 November 2016
	Kamala Devi Sharma	Rastriya Prajatantra Party Nepal	Rastriya Prajatantra Party	21 November 2016
	Dinesh Shrestha	Rastriya Prajatantra Party Nepal	Rastriya Prajatantra Party	21 November 2016
	Lila Devi Shrestha	Rastriya Prajatantra Party Nepal	Rastriya Prajatantra Party	21 November 2016
	Sushil Kumar Shrestha	Rastriya Prajatantra Party Nepal	Rastriya Prajatantra Party	21 November 2016
	Ram Kumar Subba	Rastriya Prajatantra Party Nepal	Rastriya Prajatantra Party	21 November 2016
	Bikram Bahadur Thapa	Rastriya Prajatantra Party Nepal	Rastriya Prajatantra Party	21 November 2016
	Kamal Thapa	Rastriya Prajatantra Party Nepal	Rastriya Prajatantra Party	21 November 2016
	Shyam Sundar Tibdebal	Rastriya Prajatantra Party Nepal	Rastriya Prajatantra Party	21 November 2016
	Ganga Prasad Yadav	Rastriya Prajatantra Party Nepal	Rastriya Prajatantra Party	21 November 2016
	Ganesh Thapa	Rastriya Prajatantra Party Nepal	Rastriya Prajatantra Party	21 November 2016
	Ganga Chaudhary Satgauwa	Tharuhat Terai Party, Nepal	Tharuhat Terai Party Nepal (Democratic)	25 December 2016
	Laxman Rajbanshi	Nepa Rastriya Party	Bouddhik Janatantrik Parishad	19 January 2017
	Ganga Chaudhary Satgauwa	Tharuhat Terai Party Nepal (Democratic)	Naya Shakti Party, Nepal	14 February 2017
	Sima Kumari B.K.	Rastriya Janamukti Party (Democratic)	Nepal Loktantrik Forum	5 April 2017
	Shiva Lal Thapa	Rastriya Janamukti Party (Democratic)	Nepal Loktantrik Forum	5 April 2017
	Yashoda Kumari Lama	Dalit Janajati Party	Nepal Loktantrik Forum	5 April 2017
	Gopal Dahit	Tharuhat Terai Party, Nepal	Nepal Loktantrik Forum	20 April 2017
Sarlahi 5	Jangi Lal Raya	Terai Madhesh Loktantrik Party	Rastriya Janata Party Nepal	21 April 2017
Rupandehi 6	Sarbendra Nath Shukla	Terai Madhesh Loktantrik Party	Rastriya Janata Party Nepal	21 April 2017
Rupandehi 7	Kamaleshwar Puri Goswami	Terai Madhesh Loktantrik Party	Rastriya Janata Party Nepal	21 April 2017
Kapilvastu 3	Brijesh Kumar Gupta	Terai Madhesh Loktantrik Party	Rastriya Janata Party Nepal	21 April 2017
	Kedar Nandan Chaudhary	Terai Madhesh Loktantrik Party	Rastriya Janata Party Nepal	21 April 2017
	Mina Chaudhary	Terai Madhesh Loktantrik Party	Rastriya Janata Party Nepal	21 April 2017
	Raj Kumari Gaderiya	Terai Madhesh Loktantrik Party	Rastriya Janata Party Nepal	21 April 2017
	Indra Jha	Terai Madhesh Loktantrik Party	Rastriya Janata Party Nepal	21 April 2017
	Ramesh Prasad Kurmi	Terai Madhesh Loktantrik Party	Rastriya Janata Party Nepal	21 April 2017
	Iqbal Ahmed Shah	Terai Madhesh Loktantrik Party	Rastriya Janata Party Nepal	21 April 2017
	Bijay Kumar Singh	Terai Madhesh Loktantrik Party	Rastriya Janata Party Nepal	21 April 2017
Dhanusha 4	Sanjay Kumar Sah	Sadbhavana Party	Rastriya Janata Party Nepal	21 April 2017
	Nar Singh Chaudhary	Sadbhavana Party	Rastriya Janata Party Nepal	21 April 2017
	Shaila Kumari Devi	Sadbhavana Party	Rastriya Janata Party Nepal	21 April 2017
	Laxman Lal Karna	Sadbhavana Party	Rastriya Janata Party Nepal	21 April 2017
	Bimal Kumar Kediya	Sadbhavana Party	Rastriya Janata Party Nepal	21 April 2017
	Madhawani Rani Sah	Sadbhavana Party	Rastriya Janata Party Nepal	21 April 2017
	Nirajala Raut	Rastriya Madhesh Samajbadi Party	Rastriya Janata Party Nepal	21 April 2017
	Dinesh Prasad Sah	Rastriya Madhesh Samajbadi Party	Rastriya Janata Party Nepal	21 April 2017
	Dharmendra Kumar Sah Teli	Rastriya Madhesh Samajbadi Party	Rastriya Janata Party Nepal	21 April 2017
Sarlahi 4	Mahendra Raya Yadav	Terai Madhesh Sadbhavana Party	Rastriya Janata Party Nepal	21 April 2017
	Narendra Sah Kalwar	Terai Madhesh Sadbhavana Party	Rastriya Janata Party Nepal	21 April 2017
	America Kumari	Terai Madhesh Sadbhavana Party	Rastriya Janata Party Nepal	21 April 2017
	Sarita Kumari Yadav	Madheshi Janaadhikar Forum (Republican)	Rastriya Janata Party Nepal	21 April 2017
	Dr. Dimpal Kumari Jha	Nepal Sadbhawana Party	Rastriya Janata Party Nepal	21 April 2017
Rupandehi 2	Deepak Bohara	Rastriya Prajatantra Party	Rastriya Prajatantra Party (Democratic)	6 August 2017
Chitwan 5	Bikram Pandey	Rastriya Prajatantra Party	Rastriya Prajatantra Party (Democratic)	6 August 2017
Dhankuta 2	Sunil Bahadur Thapa	Rastriya Prajatantra Party	Rastriya Prajatantra Party (Democratic)	6 August 2017
	Shayandra Bantawa	Rastriya Prajatantra Party	Rastriya Prajatantra Party (Democratic)	6 August 2017
	Biraj Bista	Rastriya Prajatantra Party	Rastriya Prajatantra Party (Democratic)	6 August 2017
	Rajeshwari Devi	Rastriya Prajatantra Party	Rastriya Prajatantra Party (Democratic)	6 August 2017
	Ishtiyak Ahmed Khan	Rastriya Prajatantra Party	Rastriya Prajatantra Party (Democratic)	6 August 2017
	Ramesh Kumar Lama	Rastriya Prajatantra Party	Rastriya Prajatantra Party (Democratic)	6 August 2017
	Resham Bahadur Lama	Rastriya Prajatantra Party	Rastriya Prajatantra Party (Democratic)	6 August 2017
	Babina Moktan Lawati	Rastriya Prajatantra Party	Rastriya Prajatantra Party (Democratic)	6 August 2017
	Sita Luitel	Rastriya Prajatantra Party	Rastriya Prajatantra Party (Democratic)	6 August 2017
	Dhano Mahara	Rastriya Prajatantra Party	Rastriya Prajatantra Party (Democratic)	6 August 2017
	Anandi Panta	Rastriya Prajatantra Party	Rastriya Prajatantra Party (Democratic)	6 August 2017
	Laxmi Thapa Paswan	Rastriya Prajatantra Party	Rastriya Prajatantra Party (Democratic)	6 August 2017
	Kamala Devi Sharma	Rastriya Prajatantra Party	Rastriya Prajatantra Party (Democratic)	6 August 2017
	Saroj Sharma	Rastriya Prajatantra Party	Rastriya Prajatantra Party (Democratic)	6 August 2017
	Lila Devi Shrestha	Rastriya Prajatantra Party	Rastriya Prajatantra Party (Democratic)	6 August 2017
	Rajya Laxmi Shrestha	Rastriya Prajatantra Party	Rastriya Prajatantra Party (Democratic)	6 August 2017
	Gita Singh	Rastriya Prajatantra Party	Rastriya Prajatantra Party (Democratic)	6 August 2017
	Ram Kumar Subba	Rastriya Prajatantra Party	Rastriya Prajatantra Party (Democratic)	6 August 2017

== By-elections or replacements ==
Constituency/PR group	Incumbent		Cause of vacation	Replacement		By-election
Constituency/PR group	Name	Party	Cause of vacation	Name	Party	By-election
Kathmandu 2	Madhav Kumar Nepal	CPN (Unified Marxist–Leninist)	Elected from Rautahat 1	Dipak Prasad Kuikel	Nepali Congress	2014
Chitwan 4	Sushil Koirala	Nepali Congress	Elected from Banke 3	Ram Krishna Ghimire	Nepali Congress	2014
Bardiya 1	Bam Dev Gautam	CPN (Unified Marxist–Leninist)	Elected from Pyuthan 1	Shyam Prasad Dhakal	CPN (Unified Marxist–Leninist)	2014
Kailali 6	Sher Bahadur Deuba	Nepali Congress	Elected from Dadeldhura 1	Pushkar Nath Ojha	Nepali Congress	2014
	Shambhu Paswan Hajari	UCPN (Maoist)	Decision by Constitutional Court	Lharkyal Lama	UCPN (Maoist)	
Baglung 1	Hari Bahadur Khadka	Nepali Congress	Death	Champa Devi Khadka	Nepali Congress	2015
	Surya Bahadur Thapa	Rastriya Prajatantra Party	Death			
Gorkha 1	Baburam Bhattarai	UCPN (Maoist)	Resigned			
	Bidya Devi Bhandari	CPN (Unified Marxist–Leninist)	Elected to President			
Banke 3	Sushil Koirala	Nepali Congress	Death			
