= Second Dahal cabinet =

Government of Nepal from 2016 to 2017

Second Dahal Cabinet
- Cabinet of Nepal
- August 2016–May 2017
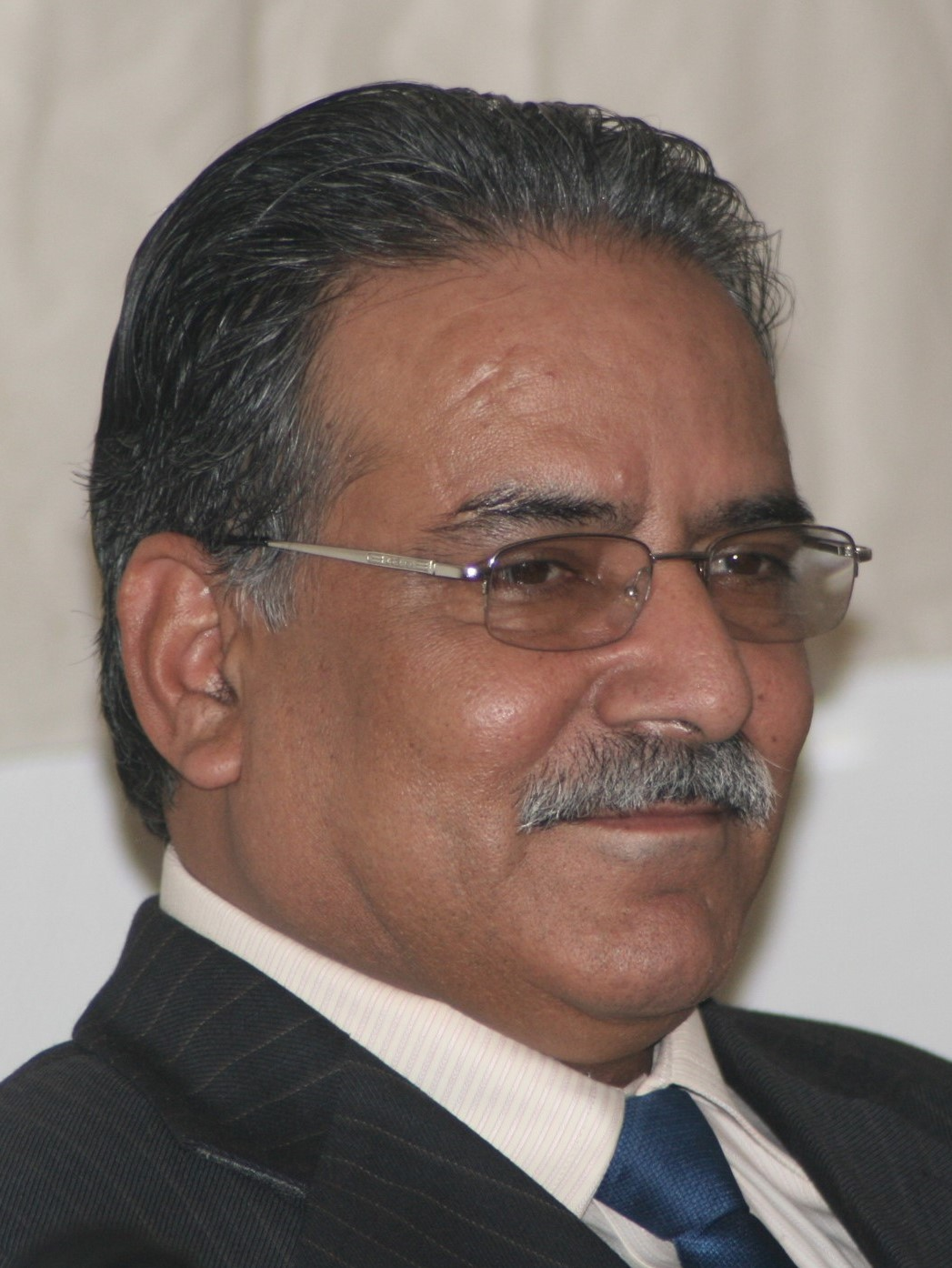
- Date formed: 4 August 2016
- Date dissolved: 31 May 2017

People and organisations
- President: Bidhya Devi Bhandari
- Prime Minister: Pushpa Kamal Dahal
- Deputy Prime Minister: Bijay Kumar Gachhadar; Krishna Bahadur Mahara; Bimalendra Nidhi
- Total no. of members: 49 appointments
- Member party: CPN (Maoist Centre); Nepali Congress; Loktantrik Forum; RPP; CPN (United); Akhanda Nepal; Samajbadi Janata

History
- Election: 2013
- Legislature term: 2015–17
- Predecessor: First Oli cabinet
- Successor: Fourth Deuba cabinet

The Second Pushpa Kamal Dahal cabinet was formed on 4 August 2016 after Pushpa Kamal Dahal of the CPN (Maoist Centre) was appointed as prime minister. The cabinet was expanded on 8, 14 & 25 August and 30 November 2016. He resigned on 31 May 2017 to make way for Sher Bahadur Deuba of the Nepali Congress.

== Cabinet ==
Portfolio	Minister	Party	Took office	Left office
Prime Minister of Nepal^{N1}	Pushpa Kamal Dahal	Maoist Centre	4 August 2016	31 May 2017
Deputy Prime Minister; Minister for Federal Affairs and Local Development	Bijay Kumar Gachhadar	Loktantrik Forum	8 May 2017	31 May 2017
Deputy Prime Minister; Minister for Home Affairs	Bimalendra Nidhi	Congress	4 August 2016	31 May 2017
Deputy Prime Minister; Minister for Finance	Krishna Bahadur Mahara	Maoist Centre	4 August 2016	31 May 2017
Minister for Urban Development	Arjun Narasingha K.C.	Congress	25 August 2016	31 May 2017
Minister for Physical Infrastructure and Transportation	Ramesh Lekhak	Congress	4 August 2016	31 May 2017
Minister for Energy	Janardhan Sharma	Maoist Centre	14 August 2016	31 May 2017
Minister for Water Supply and Sanitation	Prem Bahadur Singh	Samajbadi Janata	19 January 2017	31 May 2017
Minister for Foreign Affairs	Prakash Sharan Mahat	Congress	25 August 2016	31 May 2017
Minister for Defense	Bal Krishna Khand	Congress	25 August 2016	31 May 2017
Minister for Labour and Employment	Surya Man Gurung	Congress	25 August 2016	31 May 2017
Minister for Information and Communications	Ram Karki	Maoist Centre	14 August 2016	31 May 2017
Minister for Education	Dhaniram Paudel (Note: Appointed on 14 August 2016 without portfolio)	Maoist Centre	25 August 2016	31 May 2017
Minister for Law, Justice and Parliamentary Affairs	Ajaya Shankar Nayak	Maoist Centre	14 August 2016	31 May 2017
Minister for Agricultural Development	Gauri Shankar Chaudhary	Maoist Centre	4 August 2016	31 May 2017
Minister for Youth and Sports	Daljit Shreepaili	Maoist Centre	4 August 2016	31 May 2017
Minister for Population and Environment	Jaydev Joshi (Note: Appointed on 8 August 2016 without portfolio)	CPN (United)	11 August 2016	31 May 2017
Minister for General Administration	Keshav Kumar Budhathoki	Congress	25 August 2016	31 May 2017
Minister for Commerce	Romy Gauchan Thakali	Congress	25 August 2016	31 May 2017
Minister for Peace and Reconstruction	Sita Devi Yadav	Congress	25 August 2016	31 May 2017
Minister for Culture, Tourism and Civil Aviation	Jeevan Bahadur Shahi	Congress	25 August 2016	8 May 2017
Minister for Drinking Water and Sanitation	Jeevan Bahadur Shahi	Congress	8 May 2017	31 May 2017
Minister for Irrigation	Deepak Giri	Congress	25 August 2016	31 May 2017
Minister for Industry	Nabindra Raj Joshi	Congress	25 August 2016	31 May 2017
Minister for Forests and Soil Conservation	Shankar Bhandari	Congress	25 August 2016	31 May 2017
Minister for Health	Gagan Thapa	Congress	25 August 2016	31 May 2017
Minister for Cooperatives and Poverty Alleviation	Hridaya Ram Thani	Congress	25 August 2016	31 May 2017
Minister for Culture, Tourism and Civil Aviation	Jitendra Narayan Dev	Loktantrik Forum	8 May 2017	31 May 2017
Minister for Women, Children and Social Welfare Development	Kumar Khadka	Akhanda Nepal	19 January 2017	31 May 2017
Minister for Supplies	Deepak Bohora	RPP	11 August 2016	2 May 2017
Minister for Land Reform and Management	Bikram Pandey	RPP	11 August 2016	2 May 2017
Minister for Land Reform and Management	Gopal Dahit	Loktantrik Forum	8 May 2017	31 May 2017
Minister for Federal Affairs and Local Development	Hitraj Pandey	Maoist Centre	14 August 2016	8 May 2017
Ministers of State
Minister of State for Federal Affairs and Local Development	Shree Prasad Jabegu	Maoist Centre	14 August 2016	31 May 2017
Minister of State for Energy	Satya Narayan Bhagat	Maoist Centre	14 August 2016	31 May 2017
Minister of State for Agricultural Development	Radhika Tamang	Maoist Centre	14 August 2016	31 May 2017
Minister of State for Education	Dhanmaya B.K.	Maoist Centre	14 August 2016	31 May 2017
Minister of State for Forests and Soil Conservation	Dirgha Raj Bhatta	Congress	30 November 2016	31 May 2017
Minister of State for Physical Infrastructure and Transportation	Sitaram Mahato	Congress	30 November 2016	31 May 2017
Minister of State for Health	Taraman Gurung	Congress	30 November 2016	31 May 2017
Minister of State for Irrigation	Surendra Raj Acharya	Congress	30 November 2016	31 May 2017
Minister of State for Commerce	Subarna Jwarchan	Congress	30 November 2016	31 May 2017
Minister of State for Home Affairs	Indra Bahadur Baniya	Congress	30 November 2016	31 May 2017
Minister of State for Labour and Employment	Dilip Khawas Gachhadar	Congress	30 November 2016	31 May 2017
Minister of State for Drinking Water and Sanitation	Deepak Khadka	Congress	30 November 2016	31 May 2017
Minister of State for Industry	Kanchan Chandra Bade	Congress	30 November 2016	31 May 2017
Minister of State for Urban Development	Mithu Malla	Congress	30 November 2016	31 May 2017
Minister of State for Land Reform and Management	Yasoda Kumari Lama	Loktantrik Forum	9 May 2017	31 May 2017
Minister of State for Federal Affairs and Local Development	Janakraj Chaudhary	Loktantrik Forum	12 May 2017	31 May 2017
Minister of State for Culture, Tourism and Civil Aviation	Sumitra Tharuni	Loktantrik Forum	9 May 2017	31 May 2017

== Notes and references ==
Notes

1. Dahal also led the following ministries:

- Ministry of Water Supply and Sanitation (until 19 January 2017)
- Ministry of Women, Children and Social Welfare Development (until 19 January 2017)
- Ministry of Livestock Development
- Ministry of Science and Technology
