= Fourth Deuba cabinet =

Government of Nepal from 2017 to 2018

2017 Deuba cabinet
- Cabinet of Nepal
- 2017-2018
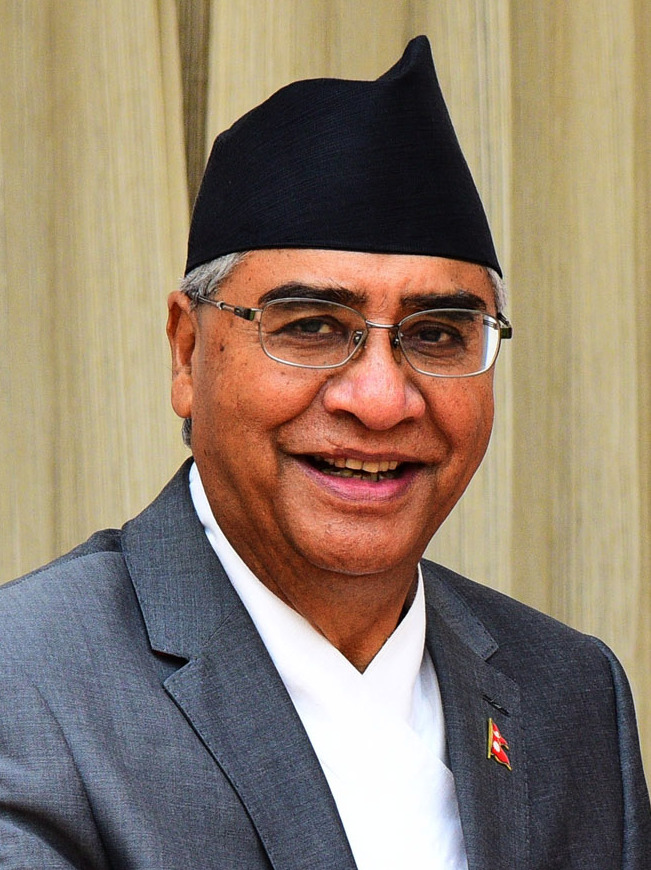
- Date formed: 7 June 2017
- Date dissolved: 15 February 2018

People and organisations
- Head of state: Bidhya Devi Bhandari
- Head of government: Sher Bahadur Deuba
- Deputy head of government: Bijay Kumar Gachhadar; Gopal Man Shrestha
- Member party: Nepali Congress; Minor parties Nepal Loktantrik Forum; Rastriya Prajatantra Party (from 17 October 2017); Former members Communist Party of Nepal (Maoist Centre) (until 17 October 2017)

History
- Election: 2013 Nepalese Constituent Assembly election
- Legislature term: 2nd Nepalese Constituent Assembly
- Predecessor: Second Dahal cabinet
- Successor: Second Oli cabinet

On 7 June 2017, Sher Bahadur Deuba got elected as the new prime minister of Nepal and therefore formed the new Governmental Cabinet of Nepal Deuba's candidacy was supported by the Rastriya Prajatantra Party Nepal, the Rastriya Janata Party Nepal, the Nepal Loktantrik Forum, the Federal Socialist Forum, Nepal and several small parties represented in the Nepalese Parliament after a power-sharing deal with the Communist Party of Nepal (Maoist Centre), who also supported Deuba's candidacy. After being sworn in, Deuba formed a new government in a coalition with the parties that supported his election. On 17 October 2017, in preparation for the Nepalese legislative election, the Communist Party of Nepal (Maoist Centre) decided to cooperate with the Communist Party of Nepal (Unified Marxist–Leninist). For this, all of their ministers left the cabinet after Prime Minister Deuba was prepared to dismiss them.

== Ministers ==
Portfolio	Minister	Party	Assumed office	Left office
Prime Minister of Nepal and Minister for Peace and Reconstruction (Note: Until 11 September 2017, Prime Minister Deuba also served as the Minister of Forests and Soil Conservation and Minister of Science and Technology.) (Note: From 17 October 2017, Prime Minister Deuba also serves as the Minister of Foreign Affairs, Minister of Home Affairs, Minister of General Administration, and Minister of Livestock Development.)	Sher Bahadur Deuba	Congress	7 June 2017	15 February 2018
Deputy Prime Minister and Minister of Education	Gopal Man Shrestha	Congress	7 June 2017	15 February 2018
Deputy Prime Minister and Minister of Federal Affairs and Local Development	Bijay Kumar Gachhadar	Loktantrik Forum	7 June 2017 (Note: Bijay Kumar Gachhadar was appointed Deputy Prime Minister and Minister of Federal Affairs and Local Development in the preceding cabinet on 8 May 2017 and kept his post in the Deuba cabinet and was officially sworn in again on 26 July 2017.)	15 February 2018
Deputy Prime Minister and Minister of Foreign Affairs	Krishna Bahadur Mahara	Maoist Centre	7 June 2017	17 October 2017
Deputy Prime Minister and Minister of Energy (Note: From 1 January 2018, Thapa also served as the Minister of Urban Development after Dil Nath Giri was dismissed from this post.)	Kamal Thapa	RPP	17 October 2017	14 February 2018
Minister of Energy	Mahendra Bahadur Shahi	Maoist Centre	26 July 2017	17 October 2017
Minister of Industry	Nabindra Raj Joshi	Congress	7 June 2017 (Note: Nabindra Raj Joshi was appointed Minister of Industry in the preceding cabinet on 27 August 2016 and kept his post in the Deuba cabinet.)	11 September 2017
Minister of Industry	Sunil Bahadur Thapa	RPP (Democratic)	11 September 2017	14 February 2018
Minister of Home Affairs	Janardhan Sharma	Maoist Centre	7 June 2017	17 October 2017
Minister of Finance	Gyanendra Bahadur Karki	Congress	7 June 2017	15 February 2018
Minister of Labour and Employment	Farmulha Mansur	Congress	7 June 2017	15 February 2018
Minister for Urban Development	Prabhu Sah	Maoist Centre	7 June 2017	17 October 2017
Minister for Urban Development	Dil Nath Giri	RPP	17 October 2017	1 January 2018
Minister for Women, Children and Social Welfare Development	Asha Koirala	Maoist Centre	26 July 2017	17 October 2017
Minister for Women, Children and Social Welfare Development	Brikam Bahadur Thapa	RPP	17 October 2017	15 February 2018
Minister for Supplies	Shiva Kumar Mandal Kewat	Maoist Centre	26 July 2017	17 October 2017
Minister for Supplies	Jayanta Chanda	RPP	17 October 2017	15 February 2018
Minister for Health	Giri Rajmani Pokharel	Maoist Centre	26 July 2017	17 October 2017
Minister for Health	Deepak Bohora	RPP (Democratic)	17 October 2017	15 February 2018
Minister of Defense	Bhimsen Das Pradhan	Congress	26 July 2017	15 February 2018
Minister for Physical Infrastructure and Transportation	Bir Bahadur Balayar	Congress	26 July 2017	15 February 2018
Minister for Culture, Tourism and Civil Aviation	Jitendra Narayan Dev	Loktantrik Forum	26 July 2017 (Note: Jitendra Narayan Dev was appointed Minister for Culture, Tourism and Civil Aviation in the preceding cabinet on 8 May 2017, kept his post in the Deuba cabinet and was officially sworn in again on 26 July 2017.)	15 February 2018
Minister for Land Reform and Management	Gopal Dahit	Loktantrik Forum	26 July 2017	15 February 2018
Minister for Information and Communications	Mohan Bahadur Basnet	Congress	26 July 2017	15 February 2018
Minister for Agricultural Development	Ram Krishna Yadav	Congress	26 July 2017	15 February 2018
Minister for Water Supply and Sanitation	Mahendra Yadav	Congress	26 July 2017	15 February 2018
Minister for Cooperatives and Poverty Alleviation	Ambika Basnet	Congress	26 July 2017	15 February 2018
Minister of Commerce	Min Bahadur Bishwakarma	Congress	26 July 2017	15 February 2018
Minister of Law, Justice and Parliamentary Affairs	Yagya Bahadur Thapa	Congress	26 July 2017	15 February 2018
Minister for Irrigation	Sanjay Kumar Gautam	Congress	26 July 2017	15 February 2018
Minister for Youth and Sports	Rajendra Kumar KC	Congress	26 July 2017	15 February 2018
Minister of Population and Environment	Mithila Chaudhari	CPN (United)	26 July 2017	15 February 2018
Minister of General Administration	Tek Bahadur Basnet	Maoist Centre	26 July 2017	17 October 2017
Minister of Livestock Development	Santa Kumar Tharu	Maoist Centre	26 July 2017	17 October 2017
Minister of Forests and Soil Conservation	Bikram Pandey	RPP (Democratic)	11 September 2017	15 February 2018
Minister of Science and Technology	Deepak Bohara	RPP (Democratic)	11 September 2017	15 February 2018

== See also ==
- Sher Bahadur Deuba
- Fifth Deuba Cabinet, 2021
- Nepali Congress
