= Sushil Koirala cabinet =

Government of Nepal from 2014 to 2015

- Cabinet of Nepal
- February 2014–October 2015
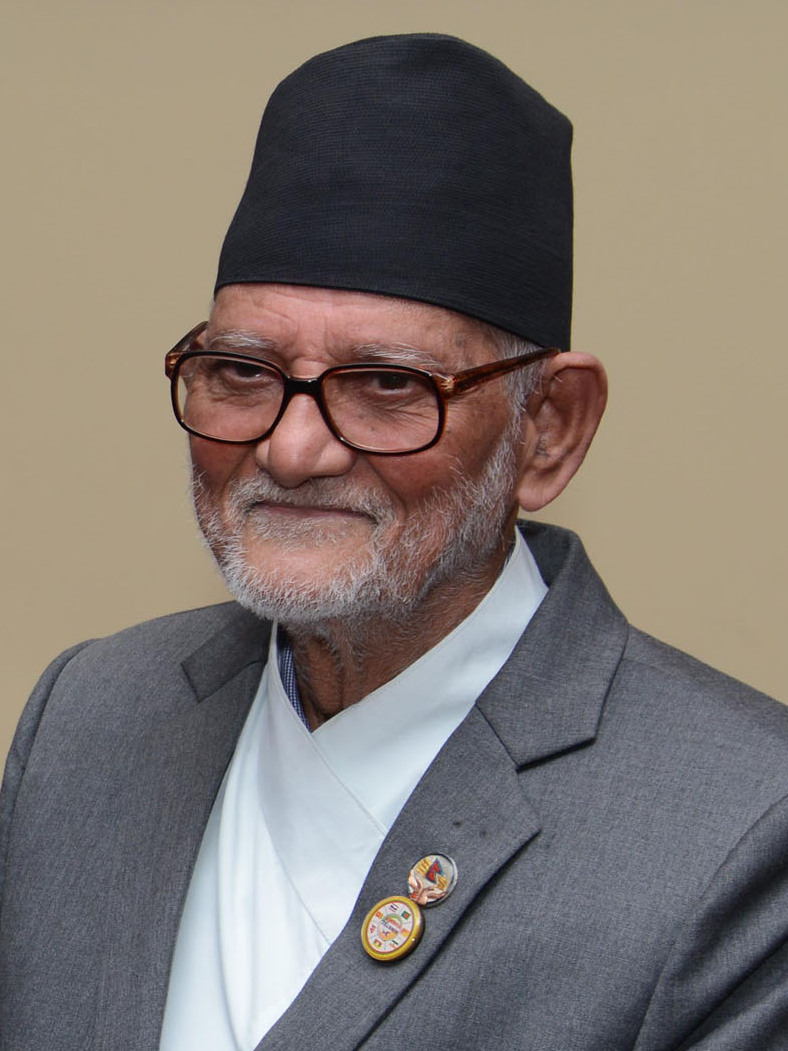
- Date formed: 25 February 2014
- Date dissolved: 12 October 2015

People and organisations
- President: Ram Baran Yadav
- Prime Minister: Sushil Koirala
- Deputy Prime Minister: Prakash Man Singh; Bam Dev Gautam
- Total no. of members: 27 appointments
- Member party: Nepali Congress; CPN (UML); RPP; RPP-N; CPN (ML)
- Status in legislature: Majority (coalition)
- Opposition party: UCPN (Maoist)
- Opposition leader: Pushpa Kamal Dahal

History
- Election: 2013
- Legislature term: 2013–15
- Predecessor: Regmi interim cabinet
- Successor: First Oli cabinet

On 25 February 2014, following the 2013 Nepalese Constituent Assembly election, the Nepali Congress Party formed a government out of the 2nd Nepalese Constituent Assembly led by Sushil Koirala and backed by the Communist Party of Nepal (Unified Marxist–Leninist). The cabinet consisted of 11 ministers from the Nepali Congress Party, 11 ministers from the Communist Party of Nepal (Unified Marxist–Leninist), one minister of the Unified Communist Party of Nepal (Maoist), two ministers of the Rastriya Prajatantra Party and five ministers from other parties. –

== Cabinet ==
Portfolio	Minister	Party	Assumed office	Left office
Prime Minister; Minister for Defence; Minister for Peace and Reconstruction; Minister for Science, Technology and Environment; Minister for Cooperatives and Poverty Alleviation	Sushil Koirala	Congress	25 February 2014	12 October 2015
Deputy Prime Minister; Minister for Local Development	Prakash Man Singh	Congress	25 February 2014	12 October 2015
Deputy Prime Minister; Minister for Home Affairs	Bam Dev Gautam	CPN (UML)	25 February 2014	12 October 2015
Minister for Finance	Ram Saran Mahat	Congress	25 February 2014	12 October 2015
Minister for Forest	Mahesh Acharya	Congress	25 February 2014	12 October 2015
Minister for Information and Communications	Minendra Rijal	Congress	25 February 2014	12 October 2015
Minister for Urban Development	Narayan Khadka	Congress	25 February 2014	12 October 2015
Minister for Law	Narahari Acharya	Congress	25 February 2014	12 October 2015
Minister for Education	Chitra Lekha Yadav	Congress	25 February 2014	12 October 2015
Minister for Irrigation	Narayan Prakash Saud	Congress	25 February 2014	12 October 2015
Minister for Physical Planning and Construction	Bimalendra Nidhi	Congress	25 February 2014	12 October 2015
Minister for Foreign Affairs	Mahendra Bahadur Pandey	CPN (UML)	25 February 2014	12 October 2015
Minister for Energy	Radha Gyawali	CPN (UML)	25 February 2014	12 October 2015
Minister for Youth and Sports	Purusottam Poudel	CPN (UML)	25 February 2014	12 October 2015
Minister for Agriculture	Hari Parajuli	CPN (UML)	25 February 2014	12 October 2015
Minister for General Administration	Lal Babu Pandit	CPN (UML)	25 February 2014	12 October 2015
Minister for Industries	Karna Bahadur Thapa	CPN (UML)	25 February 2014	14 September 2014
Minister for Industries	Mahesh Basnet	CPN (UML)	14 September 2014	12 October 2015
Minister for Tourism and Civil Aviation	Bhim Acharya	CPN (UML)	25 February 2014	13 September 2014
Minister for Tourism and Civil Aviation	Deepak Chandra Amatya	CPN (UML)	14 September 2014	22 May 2015
Minister for Tourism and Civil Aviation	Kripasur Sherpa	CPN (UML)	23 May 2015	12 October 2015
Minister for Health and Population	Khagaraj Adhikari	CPN (UML)	25 February 2014	12 October 2015
Minister for Land Reforms and Management	Dal Bahadur Rana	CPN (UML)	25 February 2014	12 October 2015
Minister for Women, Children and Social Affairs	Nilam K.C.	CPN (ML)	7 April 2014	12 October 2015
Minister for Commerce and Supplies	Sunil Thapa	RPP	7 April 2014	12 October 2015
Ministers of State
Minister of State for Labour	Tek Bahadur Gurung	Congress	25 February 2014	12 October 2015
Minister of State for Commerce and Supplies	Giri Bahadur K.C.	RPP-Nepal	7 April 2014	12 October 2015
