= Ambika Basnet =

Nepalese politician

- अम्विका बस्नेत

Member of the House of Representatives
- In office 22 December 2022 – 12 September 2025
- President: Ram Chandra Poudel
- Prime Minister: Pushpa Kamal Dahal; KP Sharma Oli
- PR group: Khas Arya (Women)
- Constituency: Nepali Congress PR list

Minister of Co-operatives and Poverty Alleviation
- In office 26 July 2017 – 15 February 2018
- President: Bidhya Devi Bhandari
- Prime Minister: Sher Bahadur Deuba
- Preceded by: Hridaya Ram Thani
- Succeeded by: Lilanath Shrestha

Member of the Legislature Parliament
- In office 21 January 2014 – 14 October 2017
- PR group: Khas Arya (Women)
- Constituency: Nepali Congress PR list

Central Committee Member, Nepali Congress
- In office 16 December 2021 – 14 January 2026
- President: Sher Bahadur Deuba
- In office 7 March 2016 – 15 December 2021
- President: Sher Bahadur Deuba
- In office 21 September 2010 – 6 March 15 2016
- President: Sushil Koirala

President of the Nepal Woman Association
- In office 23 May 2007 – 20 September 2011
- President: Girija Prasad Koirala, Sushil Koirala
- Preceded by: Mina Pandey
- Succeeded by: Dila Sangraula

Personal details
- Born: 21 January 1951 (age 75) Siphal, Kathmandu, Nepal
- Party: Nepali Congress
- Parents: Shiva Dhwoj Basnet (father); Kapil Kumari Basnet (mother)

Ambika Basnet (Nepali: अम्विका बस्नेत) is a Nepalese politician affiliated with the Nepali Congress. She served as a member of Nepal's Federal Parliament after being elected in the 2022 Nepalese general election as a proportional representative from the Khas community category. She also served as Minister of Co-operatives and Poverty Alleviation in the cabinet led by Sher Bahadur Deuba. Basnet was also a member of Nepal's Constituent Assembly and participated in the constitution-drafting process.

== Early life and political activism ==
Basnet comes from a politically active family. Her grandfather, Makardhwaj Basnet, and her father were involved in politics during the Rana regime and later opposed King Mahendra after the dissolution of Nepal's democratic system in 1960. Inspired by her family's political background and the democratic movement led by B. P. Koirala and the Nepali Congress, Basnet entered politics in the early 1970s.

She began working for the Nepali Congress in Kathmandu in 1972 during the period when political parties were banned in Nepal. During the 1985 Satyagraha movement, she was arrested and imprisoned for nearly seven months along with other democratic leaders including Ganesh Man Singh and Mangala Devi Singh.

== Constituent Assembly ==
Basnet later became a member of Nepal's Constituent Assembly, where she participated in the constitution-drafting process. In the Committee for Determining the Structure of Constitutional Bodies, she advocated for the Women's Commission to be established as a constitutional commission. She also supported equal citizenship rights for sons and daughters and promoted inclusion for women, Janajatis, Dalits, and other marginalized communities.

She was also associated with the Women's Caucus in the Constituent Assembly, which worked to raise issues relating to women's rights, citizenship, and domestic violence within the legislature and constitution-drafting process.

== Electoral History ==
In the 2017 general election, Basnest contested the House of Representatives seat from Kathmandu 3 as a candidate of the Nepali Congress. She was defeated by Krishna Bahadur Rai by a margin of 4,285 votes, receiving 19,169 votes against Rai's 14,884 votes.

Elections	Parliament of Nepal	Constituency	Political party	Result	Vote percentage	Opposition		
Elections	Parliament of Nepal	Constituency	Political party	Result	Vote percentage	Candidate	Political party	Vote percentage
2017	5th	Kathmandu 3	NC	Lost	39.7%	Krishna Bahadur Rai	CPN(UML)	51.1%
