= Deputy Prime Minister of Nepal =

Deputy Prime Minister of Federal Democratic Republic of Nepal
- संघीय लोकतान्त्रिक गणतन्त्र नेपालका उप-प्रधानमन्त्री Sanghīya lōkatāntrika gaṇatantra nēpālakā upa-pradhānamantrī (ISO)
- Emblem of Nepal

- Flag of Nepal
- Incumbent; Vacant
- Government of Nepal
- Style: The Honourable (formal); Mr. Deputy Prime Minister (informal); His Excellency (diplomatic)
- Status: Deputy head of government
- Abbreviation: DPM
- Member of: Council of Ministers; Parliament of Nepal
- Reports to: President of Nepal; Vice President of Nepal; Prime Minister of Nepal; Parliament of Nepal
- Nominator: Prime Minister of Nepal
- Appointer: President of Nepal
- Term length: At the pleasure of the president; House of Representatives term is 5 years unless dissolved sooner; No term limits specified
- Constituting instrument: Constitution of Nepal
- Formation: 17 May 1959; 67 years, 131 days ago
- First holder: Subarna Shamsher Rana
- Salary: रु77,640

The deputy prime minister of Nepal (Nepali: नेपालका उप-प्रधानमन्त्री, romanized: Nēpālakā upa-pradhānamantrī) is the deputy head of government of Nepal. The deputy prime minister is second in seniority in the Council of Ministers of Nepal. The deputy prime minister is the senior-most member of cabinet after prime minister in the Government of Nepal. The deputy prime minister presides and chairs the cabinet in the absence of prime minister.

== Constitutional provisions ==
=== Remuneration ===
The remuneration of Deputy Prime Minister of Nepal as per Section 78 of 2015 Constitution of Nepal shall be as provided for by Federal Act. Until such an Act is formulated, it shall be as determined by the Government of Nepal.

=== Oath of office ===
The Deputy Prime Minister shall take the oath of office and secrecy before the President as per Section 80 of 2015 Constitution of Nepal.

== Deputy Prime ministers of the Federal Democratic Republic of Nepal (2008–present) ==
The following individuals have been officially appointed as deputy prime minister of Nepal since the country was declared a republic in 2008:

| S.No | Name | Additional portfolio | Political party | Assumed office | Left office | Prime Minister |
|---|---|---|---|---|---|---|
| 1. | Bam Dev Gautam | Minister of Home Affairs | Communist Party of Nepal (Unified Marxist–Leninist) | August 2008 | May 2009 | Pushpa Kamal Dahal |
| 2. | Bijay Kumar Gachhadar | Minister for Physical Planning and Works | Madhesi Janaadhikar Forum, Nepal (Democratic) | 25 May 2009 | 6 February 2011 | Madhav Kumar Nepal |
| 3. | Sujata Koirala | Minister of Foreign Affairs | Nepali Congress | 12 October 2009 | 6 February 2011 | Madhav Kumar Nepal |
| 4. | Krishna Prasad Sitaula (Note: On 5 May 2012, Prime Minister Baburam Bhattarai appointed Krishna Prasad Sitaula as Minister without Portfolio upon the recommendation of Nepali Congress President Sushil Koirala.) | Minister of Defence; Minister of Law, Justice, Constituent Assembly and Parliamentary Affairs | Nepali Congress | 6 May 2012 | 29 May 2012 | Baburam Bhattarai |
| 5. | Krishna Bahadur Mahara | Minister of Home Affairs | Unified Communist Party of Nepal (Maoist) | 4 May 2011 | 29 August 2011 | Jhala Nath Khanal |
| 6. | Upendra Yadav | Minister of Foreign Affairs | Madhesi Jana Adhikar Forum | 4 May 2011 | 29 August 2011 | Jhala Nath Khanal |
| 7. | Narayan Kaji Shrestha | Minister of Foreign Affairs | Communist Party of Nepal (Maoist Centre) | 4 September 2011 | 14 March 2013 | Baburam Bhattarai |
| (2). | Bijay Kumar Gachhadar | Minister of Home Affairs | Madhesi Janaadhikar Forum, Nepal (Democratic) | 4 September 2011 | 14 March 2013 | Baburam Bhattarai |
| 8. | Prakash Man Singh | Minister for Local Development | Nepali Congress | 25 February 2014 | 12 October 2015 | Sushil Koirala |
| (1). | Bam Dev Gautam | Minister of Home Affairs | Communist Party of Nepal (Unified Marxist–Leninist) | 25 February 2014 | 12 October 2015 | Sushil Koirala |
| (2). | Bijay Kumar Gacchadar | Minister for Physical Planning and Transport | Nepal Loktantrik Forum | 12 October 2015 | 4 August 2016 | KP Sharma Oli |
| 9. | Kamal Thapa | Minister for Foreign Affairs | Rastriya Prajatantra Party | 12 October 2015 | 4 August 2016 | KP Sharma Oli |
| 10. | Top Bahadur Rayamajhi | Minister for Energy | Communist Party of Nepal (Maoist Centre) | 19 October 2015 | 4 August 2016 | KP Sharma Oli |
| 11. | Chandra Prakash Mainali | Minister for Women and Children | Communist Party of Nepal (Marxist–Leninist) (2002) | 5 November 2015 | 4 August 2016 | KP Sharma Oli |
| 12. | Chitra Bahadur KC | Minister for Cooperatives and Poverty Alleviation | Rastriya Janamorcha | 5 November 2015 | 4 August 2016 | KP Sharma Oli |
| 13. | Bhim Bahadur Rawal | Minister of Defence | Communist Party of Nepal (Unified Marxist–Leninist) | 5 November 2015 | 1 August 2016 | KP Sharma Oli |
| 14. | Bimalendra Nidhi | Minister of Home Affairs | Nepali Congress | 4 August 2016 | 31 May 2017 | Pushpa Kamal Dahal |
| (4). | Krishna Bahadur Mahara | Minister of Finance | Communist Party of Nepal (Maoist Centre) | 4 August 2016 | 31 May 2017 | Pushpa Kamal Dahal |
| (2). | Bijay Kumar Gacchhadar | Minister of Federal Affairs and Local Development | Nepal Loktantrik Forum | 8 May 2017 | 31 May 2017 | Pushpa Kamal Dahal |
| (2). | Bijay Kumar Gacchhadar | Minister of Federal Affairs and Local Development | Nepal Loktantrik Forum | 7 June 2017 | 15 February 2018 | Sher Bahadur Deuba |
| 15. | Gopal Man Shrestha | Minister of Education | Nepali Congress | 7 June 2017 | 15 February 2018 | Sher Bahadur Deuba |
| (4). | Krishna Bahadur Mahara | Minister of Foreign Affairs | Communist Party of Nepal (Maoist Centre) | 7 June 2017 | 17 October 2017 | Sher Bahadur Deuba |
| (8). | Kamal Thapa | Minister for Energy and Urban Development | Rastriya Prajatantra Party | 17 October 2017 | 14 February 2018 | Sher Bahadur Deuba |
| 16. | Ishwor Pokharel | Minister of Defence | Communist Party of Nepal (Unified Marxist–Leninist) | 1 June 2018 | 4 June 2021 | KP Sharma Oli |
| (5). | Upendra Yadav | Minister for Health and Population | Samajbadi Party, Nepal | 1 June 2018 | 20 November 2019 | KP Sharma Oli |
| (5). | Upendra Yadav | Minister for Law, Justice and Parliamentary Affairs | Samajbadi Party, Nepal | 21 November 2019 | 24 December 2019 | KP Sharma Oli |
| 17. | Bishnu Prasad Paudel | Minister of Finance | Communist Party of Nepal (Unified Marxist–Leninist) | 4 June 2021 | 22 June 2021 | KP Sharma Oli |
| 18. | Raghubir Mahaseth | Minister of Foreign Affairs | Communist Party of Nepal (Unified Marxist–Leninist) | 4 June 2021 | 22 June 2021 | KP Sharma Oli |
| 19. | Rajendra Mahato | Ministry of Urban Development | People's Socialist Party, Nepal | 4 June 2021 | 22 June 2021 | KP Sharma Oli |
| (6). | Narayan Kaji Shrestha | Minister of Physical Infrastructure and Transport | Communist Party of Nepal (Maoist Centre) | 26 December 2022 | 15 July 2024 | KP Sharma Oli |
| (6). | Narayan Kaji Shrestha | Minister of Physical Infrastructure and Transport | Communist Party of Nepal (Maoist Centre) | 26 December 2022 | 15 July 2024 | Pushpa Kamal Dahal |
| (16). | Bishnu Prasad Paudel | Minister of Finance | Communist Party of Nepal (Unified Marxist–Leninist) | 26 December 2022 | 27 February 2023 | Pushpa Kamal Dahal |
| 20. | Rabi Lamichhane | Minister of Home Affairs | Rastriya Swatantra Party | 26 December 2022 | 27 January 2023 | Pushpa Kamal Dahal |
| 21. | Rajendra Prasad Lingden | Minister for Energy, Water Resources and Irrigation | Rastriya Prajatantra Party | 17 January 2023 | 25 February 2023 | Pushpa Kamal Dahal |
| 21. | Purna Bahadur Khadka | Minister for Defence | Nepali Congress | 31 March 2023 | 4 March 2024 | Pushpa Kamal Dahal |
| (17). | Raghubir Mahaseth | Minister of Physical Infrastructure and Transport | Communist Party of Nepal (Unified Marxist–Leninist) | 6 March 2024 | 15 July 2024 | Pushpa Kamal Dahal |
| (19). | Rabi Lamichhane | Minister of Home Affairs | Rastriya Swatantra Party | 6 March 2024 | 15 July 2024 | Pushpa Kamal Dahal |
| (5). | Upendra Yadav | Minister for Health and Population | People's Socialist Party, Nepal | 10 March 2024 | 13 May 2024 | Pushpa Kamal Dahal |
| (7). | Prakash Man Singh | Minister for Urban Development | Nepali Congress | 15 July 2024 | 9 September 2025 | K. P. Sharma Oli |
| (16). | Bishnu Prasad Paudel | Minister of Finance | Communist Party of Nepal (Unified Marxist–Leninist) | 15 July 2024 | 9 September 2025 | K. P. Sharma Oli |
