= Krishna Bhakta Pokhrel =

Nepali politician

- कृष्णभक्त पोखरेल

Member of Parliament, Pratinidhi Sabha
- In office 4 March 2018 – 18 September 2022
- Preceded by: Shesh Nath Adhikari
- Succeeded by: Rabi Lamichhane
- Constituency: Chitwan 2

Member of Constituent Assembly
- In office 21 January 2014 – 14 October 2017
- Preceded by: Narayan Prasad Dahal
- Succeeded by: Pushpa Kamal Dahal
- Constituency: Chitwan 3

Personal details
- Born: 4 July 1967 (age 58)
- Party: CPN (UML)
- Profession: Lawyer

Krishna Bhakta Pokhrel (born 4 July 1967) is a Nepali communist politician and was a member of the House of Representatives of the federal parliament of Nepal. He was elected to the House of Representatives in 2018 as a part of his second term having previously been elected to the second constituent assembly in 2013.

He is a lawyer by profession and had been practising law at Chitwan District Court for more than 20 years, as of 2013.

== Personal life ==
He was born on 4 July 1967 in Parbatipur-4, Chitwan. He has three daughters.

== Political career ==
He joined politics as a student and served as secretary of ANNFSU, the student wing of CPN UML in 1992. He also became the vice-chairman of Chitwan district working committee for the party. As of 2013, had been a CPN UML Chitwan district committee member for 20 years.

In the second constituent assembly election held in 2013, he was the candidate for CPN UML in Chitwan-3 constituency and defeated Narayan Dahal of CPN (Maoist Centre).

For his current term, he was elected under the first-past-the-post system from Chitwan-2 constituency as a candidate from CPN UML of the left alliance. Following his election to parliament, he was appointed chair of the rule-drafting committee of the House. He is also the Chairperson of the Law, Justice and Human Rights Committee of the House.
