= Gopal Dahit =

Nepalese politician

- डा. गोपाल दहित
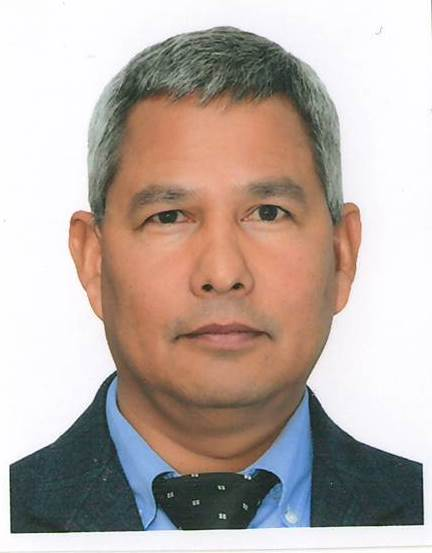

Minister of Land Reform and Management
- In office 8 May 2017 – February 2018
- Prime Minister: Pushpa Kamal Dahal; Sher Bahadur Deuba

Member of the Constituent Assembly
- In office 2013–2017

Central Committee Member, Nepali Congress

Personal details
- Born: Nayagaun, Bardiya District, Nepal
- Party: Nepali Congress
- Other political affiliations: Tharuhat Tarai Party Nepal; Nepal Loktantrik Forum
- Spouse: Janaki Dahit
- Education: Tribhuvan University (M.Management); Nepal Law Campus (LLB); Lumbini Buddhist University (PhD)

Gopal Dahit (Nepali: डा. गोपाल दहित) is a Nepalese politician and central committee member of the Nepali Congress. He served as the Minister of Land Reform and Management in 2017 under the governments of Pushpa Kamal Dahal and Sher Bahadur Deuba. Dahit was also a member of the 2nd Nepalese Constituent Assembly from 2013 to 2017. He is a key figure in the 2015 Tharuhat Movement.

== Early life ==
Dahit was born in Nayagaun, Bardiya District, Nepal. His father is Khumlal Dahit and the mother is Kalti Dahit. He earned his Master's degree in Management from Tribhuvan University in 1995, a Bachelor's degree in Law from Nepal Law Campus in 2003, and a Ph.D. from Lumbini Buddhist University in 2018.

== Political career ==
From 1995 to 2005, Dahit served as district president and central representative of the Tharu Welfare Society. He was later a central member of the Tharuhat Joint Struggle Committee during the Tharuhat Movement in 2015. He was among the senior leaders of the Tharuhat Tarai Party Nepal and served as the parliamentary leader. In 2015 he was elected to the Constituent Assembly of Nepal.

In April 2017, when the Tharuhat Tarai Party and Nepal Loktantrik Forum unified, Dahit became a parliament member and central committee official. On 8 May 2017, he was appointed Minister of Land Reform and Management in the cabinet of Pushpa Kamal Dahal. He briefly held the post again in July 2017 under Sher Bahadur Deuba's government, serving until February 2018. Dahit serves as the member of the Central Convention Direction Committee of Nepal Tharu Sangh.
