= Ganga Chaudhary Satgauwa =

Nepali politician

- गंगा चौधरी सत्गौवा

Member of Parliament, Pratinidhi Sabha for CPN (UML) party list
- In office 4 March 2018 – 18 September 2022

Member of Constituent Assembly for Tharuhat Terai Party list
- In office 21 January 2014 – 14 October 2017

Personal details
- Born: 1 June 1979 (age 47)
- Party: CPN (UML)
- Other party: Tharuhat Terai Party; Naya Shakti

Ganga Chaudhary Satgauwa (Nepali: गंगा चौधरी सत्गौवा), popularly known as Ganga Chaudhary is a Nepali politician and a member of the House of Representatives of the federal parliament of Nepal. She is also a member of the Women and Social Welfare Committee of the parliament.

She was elected under the proportional representation system from CPN UML of the left alliance in the 2017 legislative elections. She had defected to UML immediately prior to the election, without informing her previous party Naya Sakti Party Nepal, which also included her name in the list of party candidates. Chaudhary later informed the election commission of her allegiance to UML.

Chaudhary was previously elected to the 2nd Constituent Assembly also through the proportional representation system, from Tharuhat Terai Party Nepal. After the promulgation of the constitution, she led the Parliamentary legislative committee in the Legislature parliament (which was formed as per the redefined role of the constituent assembly). She was accused of acting against party interests and trying to form a breakaway faction, in 2016, and expelled from the party.

Following the expulsion, she had joined the Naya Sakti Party and was considered close to Baburam Bhattarai. However, owing to the possibility that the party wouldn't cross the required three percent threshold of voter support in the 2017 elections, she chose to go back to CPN UML, the party she was previously affiliated to before she joined the Tharu nationalist struggle. Following the merger of CPN UML with the Maoist party to form Nepal Communist Party (NCP), she represents the newly formed party in parliament.
