= Lal Bahadur Rawal =

Nepali politician

Lal Bahadur Rawal (L.B Rawal)

Personal details
- Born: February 2, 1963 (age 63) Parakatne–5, Thalara, Bajhang
- Party: Communist Party of Nepal (Unified Marxist–Leninist)
- Domestic partner: Mira Devi Rawal
- Children: Elder Son Bharat Rawal, Darwin Rawal and Younger Son Rajkumar Rawal
- Parents: Pathan Rawal; Basamati Rawal

Lal Bahadur Rawal (Nepali: लाल बहादुर रावल) is a Nepalese politician and a member of the 2nd Nepalese Constituent Assembly. He was elected from the Bajhang-2 constituency in the 2013 Constituent Assembly election as a candidate of the Communist Party of Nepal (Unified Marxist–Leninist).
