= Nilam K.C. (Khadka) =

Nepali politician

Minister of Women, Children and Senior Citizens
- In office 25 February 2014 – 12 October 2015
- President: Ram Baran Yadav
- Prime Minister: Sushil Koirala
- Succeeded by: Chandra Prakash Mainali

Personal details
- Party: CPN ML

Nilam K.C. (Khadka) (Nepali: निलम केसी खँड्का) is a Nepalese politician, belonging to the Communist Party of Nepal (Marxist-Leninist). After the 2008 Constituent Assembly election she became a Constituent Assembly member.
