= Laxman Rajbanshi =

Nepali educator

Laxman Rajbanshi was the founding principal of the Siddhartha Vanasthali Institute and a member of the Nepalese parliament. He had also authored many books in Nepali as well as Nepal Bhasa. Some of his works in Nepal Bhasa to be translated into English include Red Sun and other stories, Uncertain Future and other stories, etc. Beyond his political and literary work, Rajbanshi also contributed his linguistic expertise to academic and medical fields, notably assisting in the translation of the DN4 neuropathic pain questionnaire into Nepali for a validation study conducted at a teaching hospital in Kathmandu.

== See also ==
Siddhartha Vanasthali Institute
