= Dulari Devi (politician) =

Nepali politician

Personal details
- Party: CPN UML

Dulari Devi (Nepali: दुलारी देवी) (1970–2017) was a Nepali politician and member of parliament. She was elected to the second constituent assembly in 2013, through the proportional representation system.

She was a member of CPN UML party. She had come into contact with CPN UML leaders around 1993–94 and had become a registered member since 1995–96. She was considered an asset in the party, as a woman, madhesi and dalit leader.

== Personal life ==
She was born on 16 April 1970 in Brahmapuri, Sarlahi. She was married to Sukhari Aghori and had four children-- two sons and two daughters. She was from Brahmapuri-8, Sarlahi, but had been living in Kathmandu.

== Death ==
She died on 23 March 2017 from injuries sustained in a road accident, while still an MP.

The motorcycle she was on had been hit by a truck in Sitamarhi, India, on 16 March. She had been undergoing treatment at B & B Hospital, Lalitpur since 17 March. Her leg had had to be amputated, but she succumbed to her injuries.
