= Janardan Dhakal =

Nepali politician

- जनार्दन ढकाल
- Incumbent
- Assumed office 2013
- Constituency: Rasuwa

Personal details
- Party: Nepali Congress (2026-present)
- Other party: Communist Party of Nepal (Unified Marxist-Leninist) (till 2026)

Janardan Dhakal (Nepali: जनार्दन ढकाल) is a Nepali politician belonging to Nepali Congress. Dhakal is a former member of 2nd Nepalese Constituent Assembly. He won Rasuwa 1 seat in 2013 Nepalese Constituent Assembly election from Communist Party of Nepal (Unified Marxist-Leninist).
