= C. P. Mainali =

Nepalese politician

Chandra Prakash Mainali
- चन्द्रप्रकाश मैनाली
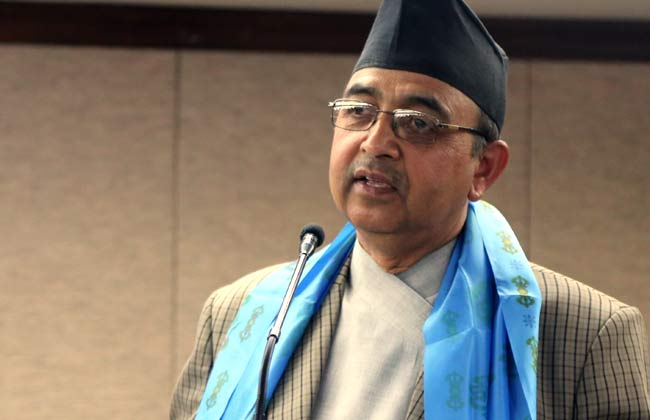

General Secretary of the Communist Party of Nepal (Marxist–Leninist)
- Incumbent
- Assumed office 2002
- Preceded by: Bam Dev Gautam

Deputy Prime Minister of Nepal
- In office 4 November 2015 – 4 August 2016 Serving with Bijay Kumar Gachhadar, Kamal Thapa, Bhim Rawal, Chitra Bahadur K.C. and Top Bahadur Rayamajhi
- President: Bidhya Devi Bhandari
- Prime Minister: Khadga Prasad Sharma Oli
- Preceded by: Prakash Man Singh; Bam Dev Gautam
- Succeeded by: Bimalendra Nidhi; Krishna Bahadur Mahara; Bijay Kumar Gachhadar

Minister of Women, Children and Social Welfare of Nepal
- In office 4 November 2015 – 4 August 2016
- President: Bidhya Devi Bhandari
- Prime Minister: Khadga Prasad Sharma Oli
- Preceded by: Nilam K.C. (Khadka)
- Succeeded by: Kumar Khadka (Note: Until 19 January 2017, Prime Minister Dahal also served as the Minister of Women, Children and Social Welfare)

Minister of Local Level of Nepal
- In office 30 November 1994 – 12 September 1995
- Monarch: Birendra of Nepal
- Prime Minister: Man Mohan Adhikari
- Preceded by: Ram Chandra Poudel
- Succeeded by: Khum Bahadur Khadka

Minister of Supplies of Nepal
- In office 30 November 1994 – 12 September 1995
- Monarch: Birendra of Nepal
- Prime Minister: Man Mohan Adhikari
- Preceded by: Surendra Prasad Chaudhary (as Minister of Commerce and Supplies)
- Succeeded by: Gajendra Narayan Singh

Member of Parliament, Pratinidhi Sabha
- In office 1994–1999
- Preceded by: Devi Prasad Ojha
- Succeeded by: Khadga Prasad Sharma Oli
- Constituency: Jhapa 2
- In office 1991–1994
- Preceded by: Constituency created
- Succeeded by: Radha Krishna Mainali
- Constituency: Jhapa 5

Member of the Constituent Assembly / Legislature Parliament
- In office 28 May 2008 – 14 October 2017

Member of the Interim Legislature Parliament
- In office 28 April 2006 – 16 January 2008

Personal details
- Born: August 22, 1951 (age 74) Chokpur, Taplejung
- Party: CPN(ML)
- Parent(s): Dhanpati Mainali; Chandrakumari Mainali
- Profession: Politician

Chandra Prakash Mainali, more commonly known as C. P. Mainali, (born August 22, 1951, in Chokpur, Taplejung District) is a Nepalese communist politician and former Deputy Prime Minister of Nepal.

== Political life ==
=== Jhapa revolt ===
In the early 1970s he was one (along with his brother, R.K. Mainali) of the radical communists who led the Jhapa rebellion, inspired by the Naxalite movement in India.

=== Early politics ===
From 1965 onwards he was involved in the student movement. In 1970, Mainali joined the Communist Party of Nepal. During his years as a political activist, he had aliases ('party names') such as Jay, Subhas, Devi and Kanchan.

In 1971, Mainali was one of a group of young leaders of the Jhapa District Committee of the Communist Party of Nepal. The other main leaders of this group were Radha Krishna Mainali, Mainali's brother, and Mohan Chandra Adhikari. The group was inspired by the Naxalbari rebellion in India and its leader Charu Majumdar. In May 1971, the group initiated an armed rebellion, killing landlords and other perceived class enemies.

The party's leadership did not approve of the methods used by the Jhapa movement, and Mainali and his fellows were now an independent grouping. The state forces rapidly crushed the rebellion and hundreds of its followers were killed, jailed or forced into exile. Nevertheless, the group continued to conduct clandestine political work amongst the peasants of Jhapa.

In 1975, the survivors of the Jhapa movement took the initiative to found the All Nepal Communist Revolutionary Coordination Committee (Marxist-Leninist). Other small groups merged with ANCRCC (ML). On December 26, 1978, ANCRCC (ML) organized the founding congress of the Communist Party of Nepal (Marxist-Leninist). Mainali was elected general secretary of the party. CPN (ML) was an underground party, and conducted small-scale, armed activities against the regime and feudal landlords.

However, the tactics of armed struggle did not prove to be successful for CPN (ML). The party changed its political approach and started to focus more on mobilizing mass movements for a democratic change. Mainali, clearly identified with the initial militant phase of the party, was removed from his post of general secretary and replaced by Jhala Nath Khanal.

Later CPN (ML) would merge into Communist Party of Nepal (Unified Marxist-Leninist).

=== First term as minister ===
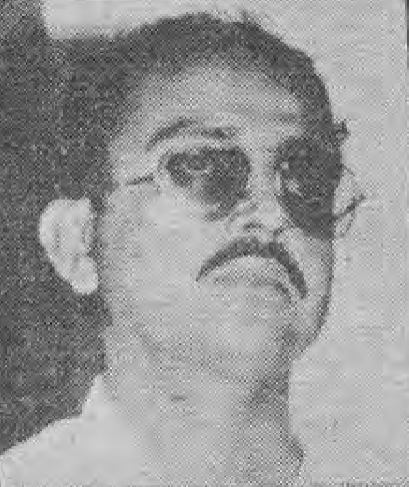
Mainali in 1993

When CPN (UML), under Man Mohan Adhikari's premiership, formed a minority government in 1994, C.P. Mainali was nominated to become the speaker of the legislative. He was, however, defeated by the Nepali Congress nominee, Ram Chandra Paudel. Mainali was then named Minister for Local Development and Supply.

=== CPN (UML) split ===
In 1998 CPN (UML) was torn by internal strife. Mainali and Bam Dev Gautam led a break-away group that was named Communist Party of Nepal (Marxist-Leninist). CPN (ML) briefly joined a Nepali Congress government led by G.P. Koirala. In the 1999 parliamentary elections CPN (ML) failed miserably to challenge the domination of CPN (UML). The party did get an impressive 6.4% of the national vote, but failed to win a single seat.

At the time of the 2000 CPN (ML) party congress, Mainali challenged Bam Dev Gautam for the post of general secretary. Whereas Gautam upheld the line of People's Multiparty Democracy as formulated by Madan Kumar Bhandari (which was also the political line of CPN (UML)), Mainali argued for a more radical political approach.

In 2002 CPN (ML) and CPN (UML) re-unified. However, C.P. Mainali refused to go along with the merger and refounded CPN(ML). He remained as the general secretary of the party.

During the anti-government protests in 2002–2006, Mainali was one of the main leaders of the United Left Front. He has served as ULF chairman for a period. Following the February 1, 2005 royal coup d'état, Mainali was placed in house arrest. He was released on February 25.

=== Constituent assembly ===
In January 2007, Mainali was inducted into the interim parliament. He was the chairman of the Natural Resources Committee of the interim parliament. After the 2008 Constituent Assembly election, Mainali became a Constituent Assembly member.

=== As Deputy Prime minister ===
Mainali served as deputy prime minister for a brief period in the first Oli cabinet. He was also assigned Minister for Women, Children and Social Welfare.
