= JB Tuhure =

Nepali singer (1943–2021)

Juth Bahadur Khadgi (Nepali: जे.बी. टुहुरे; 1943 – 26 August 2021), better known as JB Tuhure, was a Nepali singer and Member of Parliament (MP). He was titled Janagayak (people's singer) as he sang revolutionary songs; he recorded over 150 songs.

Tuhure was born Juth Bahadur Khadgi in Dharan, Province No. 1, Nepal. He lost his father when he was 20 years old, and since then started using Tuhure (which means orphan) as his surname. He died on 26 August 2021 in Kathmandu due to brain hemorrhage.
