= Krishna Kumar Rai =

Nepali politician

- Incumbent
- Assumed office 2013
- Constituency: Sunsari-1

Personal details
- Party: Communist Party of Nepal (Unified Marxist-Leninist)

Krishna Kumar Rai (Nepali: कृष्ण कुमार राई) is a member of 2nd Nepalese Constituent Assembly. He won Sunsari–1 seat in 2013 Nepalese Constituent Assembly election from Communist Party of Nepal (Unified Marxist-Leninist).
