= Ministry of Land Management, Cooperatives and Poverty Alleviation =

Government ministry of Nepal

- भूमि व्यवस्था,सहकारी तथा गरिबी निवारण मन्त्रालय

Agency overview
- Formed: 1964
- Jurisdiction: Government of Nepal
- Headquarters: Singha Durbar, Kathmandu, Nepal
- Minister responsible: Pratibha Rawal, Cabinet Minister
- Agency executive: Gokarna Mani Duwadee, Secretary
- Website: molcpa.gov.np

The Ministry of Land Management, Cooperatives and Poverty Alleviation (Nepali: भूमि व्यवस्था, सहकारी तथा गरिबी निवारण मन्त्रालय) is a governmental ministry of Nepal responsible for land administration and management activities which ensures efficient and effective administration and sustainable management of available land resources throughout the country. The ministry, then called Ministry of Land Reform and Management, was merged with the Ministry of Co-operatives and Poverty Alleviation to form the Ministry of Agriculture, Land Management and Cooperatives in February 2018, but was reopened and renamed as a separate ministry in August 2018 as the Ministry of Land Management, Cooperatives and Poverty Alleviation.

== History ==
The ministry was established in 1964 with three directorates (land reform, cooperatives and cadastral survey). One year later, three further directorates were added to its portfolio (agriculture, food and land management). In 1970, the Ministry split into the Ministry of Food and Agriculture and the Ministry of Panchayat, Home and Land Reform. The ministry received its last portfolio of Land Reform and Management in 1986. Gopal Dahit of Nepal Loktantrik Forum under the Deuba Cabinet served as the last Minister of Land Reform and Management until the ministry was dissolved in 2018 and merged into the Ministry of Agriculture, Land Management and Cooperatives following the Oli cabinet, 2018's decision to reduce the number of ministries in Nepal. Due to a cabinet expansion, the Ministry of Land Management, Cooperatives and Poverty Alleviation was reopened while the agriculture-related portfolio was changed to Ministry of Agricultural and Livestock Development.

== Organisational structure ==
Four departments served under the ministry to facilitate and implement its work:

- Survey Department
- Department of Land Management And Archive
- Department of Co-operatives
- Land Management Training Centre (in Dhulikhel, Kavre)
