= Biswendra Paswan =

Nepali politician

Vishwendra Paswan
- विश्वेन्द्र पासवान
- President: Bahujan Shakti Party

Personal details
- Party: Dalit Janajati Party; Bahujan Shakti Party (now)
- Education: Tribhuvan University

Vishwendra Paswan (Nepali: विश्वेन्द्र पासवान) is a Nepalese politician and human rights activist. He was the chairman of the Dalit Janajati Party. He is the president of the Bahujan Shakti Party and an avowed Ambedkarite. He was a member of the Nepalese Constituent Assembly. He served as Minister of Science, Technology, Environment and Population, Govt. of Nepal. He belongs to Dalit community, and follows Buddhism.

Vishwendra Paswan is known as the "Ambedkar of Nepal".

In the 2008 Constituent Assembly election, the Dalit Janajati Party won 1 seat through the Proportional Representation vote. The party selected Paswan as its representative in the assembly.
