= Dalit Janajati Party =

Dalit Janajati Party दलित जनजाति पार्टी
- President: Vishwendraman Pashwan
- Succeeded by: Bahujan Shakti Party, Nepal

Election symbol

Dalit Janajati Party is a political party in Nepal. In the 2008 Constituent Assembly election, the party won 1 seat through the Proportional Representation vote.

The party is a continuent of the Federal Republic National Front.

Dalit Janajati Party has 45 central member committee. Dille Mijar is treasurer of the party. Tej Bahadur Nepali is in charge of Foreign Department.

The party merged into Nepal Loktantrik Forum which later joined Nepali Congress. A faction led by is currently in Bahujan Shakti Party, Nepal.
