= Shesh Nath Adhikari =

Nepali politician

SheshNath Adhikari
- शेषनाथ अधिकारी
- Incumbent
- Assumed office 2008
- Constituency: Chitwan-2

Personal details
- Party: Nepali Congress
- Occupation: Politician

SheshNath Adhikari (Nepali: शेषनाथ अधिकारी) is a member of the 2nd Nepalese Constituent Assembly. He won the Chitwan–2 seat in 2013 Nepalese Constituent Assembly election from the Nepali Congress.
