= Sita Devi Yadav =

India born Nepalese politician

- सीता देवी यादव

Member of Parliament, Pratinidhi Sabha for Nepali Congress party list
- Incumbent
- Assumed office 4 March 2018

Member of Constituent Assembly
- In office 21 January 2017 – 14 October 2014
- Preceded by: Bijay Kumar Yadav
- Succeeded by: Lila Nath Shrestha
- Constituency: Siraha 3

Personal details
- Born: November 16, 1955 (age 70)
- Party: Nepali Congress

Sita Devi Yadav is a Nepalese politician, belonging to the Nepali Congress currently serving as the member of the 1st Federal Parliament of Nepal. In the 2017 Nepalese general election she was elected as a proportional representative from Madheshi category.
