= Siddhartha Vanasthali Institute =

School in Nepal

- Motto: Knowledge is Power
- Type: [Public Trust]
- Established: 1973
- Administrative staff: 300
- Students: 4000
- Location: Kathmandu, Nepal; 27°43′35.14″N 85°17′51.9″E
- Website: svi.edu.np

Siddhartha Vanasthali Institute (SVI) is an academic institution in Balaju, Kathmandu, Nepal. It runs from primary school level to secondary high school up to university level courses. It was founded by Bhuwan Lal Joshi and Vijaynandan Joshi in 1951.

== Notable alumni ==
The Siddhartha Vanasthali alumni association (SIVAA) was established in 1985, through the effort of the 1977 graduating class.

- Sanduk Ruit
- Temba Tsheri Sherpa
- Jharana Bajracharya, actress and former Miss Nepal
- Gagan Thapa
- Niruta Singh
- Gagan Thapa
