= Keshav Kumar Budhathoki =

Nepalese politician (died 2024)

- केशव कुमार बुढाथोकी

Defence Minister of Nepal
- In office 26 August 2016 – 31 May 2017

Member of Legislature Parliament of Nepal
- In office 2013 – 5 February 2024
- Constituency: Jhapa - 5

Personal details
- Born: 1943/1944
- Died: 5 February 2024 (aged 80) Biratnagar, Nepal
- Party: Nepali Congress

Keshav Kumar Budhathoki (Nepali: केशव कुमार बुढाथोकी; 1943/1944 – 5 February 2024) was a Nepalese politician, belonging to the Nepali Congress. He was the Jhapa District President of Nepali Congress (Democratic). In April 2008, he won the Jhapa-5 seat in the Constituent Assembly election with 16466 votes.

Budhathoki was inducted in the central working committee of Nepali Congress on 25 February 2012. He was appointed zonal coordinator of Sagarmatha region on 28 April 2013.

Budhathoki died from prostate cancer on 5 February 2024, at the age of 80.
