= Yagya Bahadur Thapa =

Nepali revolutionary (1917–1978)

- यज्ञबहादुर थापा

Personal details
- Born: 1917
- Died: 1978 (aged 60–61)
- Political party: Nepali Congress
- Known for: led armed revolution in 1974 against Government; a recognised martyr

Military service
- Rank: Captain

Yagya Bahadur Thapa (Nepali: यज्ञबहादुर थापा) is a recognised martyr of Nepal. He was given the martyrdom status by the Government of Nepal in March 2016. He was born in 1917 in Okhaldhunga district and was a member of Nepali Congress in the 1970s when it was banned. Along with Bhim Narayan Shrestha, he was a leader in armed revolt in 1974 and was a leader in the banned Nepali Congress. He was implicated in a bomb attack on the King of Nepal in Biratnagar. He joined with mutineers at the eastern hill district of Okhaldunga in an attempted armed revolution. He was arrested attempting to capture Okhaldunga.

A one-man tribunal of Ridhima Nand Rajacharya sentenced Captain Yagya Bahadur Thapa and Bhim Narayan Shrestha to death. The Supreme Court of Nepal upheld the decision. In 1978 he was executed in a forest south of Hetauda.
