= Jana Jagaran Party Nepal =

Political party in Nepal

The Janajagaran Party Nepal (Nepali: जनजागरण पार्टी नेपाल; English: Awareness Party Nepal) (abbreviation: JPN) is a political party in Nepal. It was led by Lok Mani Dhakal (2013-2017) afterwards by BP Khanal, PhD.

The Janajagaran Party won 1 seat in the 2013 Nepalese Constituent Assembly election.

JPN is one of the few parties in Nepal, and S. Asia, which is committed to republicanism, rule of law, and unbound civic liberties. Though it toyed with the idea of socialism and collectivism to a degree in its formative years, the party slowly moved to the center and slightly center-right over the years.

Recently, the party retained its name with slight changes on party's flag as it unified another party namely People's Party Nepal.

The party held its second Central Convention on 29–30 December 2021, at Dhading Besi, Dhading of Bagmati Province which elected a 31 member central executive committee, with a provision where other officials can be nominated later on.

The newly elected team is led by: Dr. BP Khanal - Central Chairperson; Mr Sunil Maharjan - Senior Vice-chair; Mr Dwarika Shrestha - Vice-chair; Mr Roshan (T.P.) Khatiwada - General Secretary; Mr Hirakaji Maharjan - Treasurer; Mr Bidur Adhikari - Deputy General Secretary (& Spokesperson); Mr Abhishek (Purushottam P) Uprety - Under General-secretary, and Mr Raju Nepal- Chieft Secretary, among others (https://adhikpost.com/2021/12/30).

The party is republican/democratic, capitalist, freedom and sanctity of human life defending one (https://adhikpost.com/2021/12/30).
