= Akhanda Nepal Party =

Akhanda Nepal Party अखण्ड नेपाल पार्टी
- President: Kumar Khadka
- Merged into: Nepali Congress
- Headquarters: Kuleswor Height, Ravibhavan, Kathmandu, Nepal
- Ideology: State Hinduism; Non-ethnic federalism
- Political position: Right-wing

Website
- akhandanepal.org

Akhanda Nepal Party (Nepali: अखण्ड नेपाल पार्टी, 'Great Nepal Party') was a political party in Nepal. As of 2013, the chairman of the party was Kumar Khadka. The party joined Nepali Congress ahead of the 2017 Nepalese general election.

The party calls for the reinstatement of Nepal as a Hindu state. It proposes a topography-based federal system in Nepal, and opposes a federal structure drawn along ethnic/linguistic lines. The party favoured a presidential system, with a directly elected president that appoints a government.

The party registered itself with the Election Commission of Nepal ahead of the 2013 Constituent Assembly election. It presented 105 candidates in FPTP constituencies. For the Proportional Representation vote the party submitted a list of 100 candidates, headed by Anirudra Thapa. The election symbol of the party is a pennon.

== History ==
On 19 January 2017, the party for the first time joined the government, for which chairman Kumar Khadka joined the Second Dahal coalition government as the Minister for Women, Children and Social Welfare Development.

On 22 April 2017, the Akhanda Party Nepal joined the Nepali Congress ahead of the 2017 Nepalese local elections.

== See also ==
- Nepali Congress
