= Tharuhat Tarai Party Nepal =

The Tharuhat Tarai Party Nepal (Nepali: थरुहट तराई पार्टी नेपाल) was a political party in Nepal. It was led by Bhanuram Chaudary. It merged with Nepal Loktantrik Forum in April 2017. Later the party joined Nepali Congress.

The Tharuhat Tarai Party won two seats in the 2013 Nepalese Constituent Assembly election.
