= Hit Raj Pandey =

Nepalese politician

Honourable Hit Raj Pandey

Member of Parliament, Pratinidhi Sabha for CPN (Maoist Centre)
- In office 2022 – 12 September 2025

Personal details
- Party: CPN (Maoist Centre)
- Other political affiliations: CPN (Maoist Centre)
- Spouse: Sanu Pande Lohani
- Parents: Khilnidhi (father); Sham Kumari (mother)

Hit Raj Pandey is a Nepalese politician, belonging to the CPN (Maoist Centre) Party. He served as a member of the 2nd Federal Parliament of Nepal. In the 2022 Nepalese general election he was elected as a proportional representative from the Khas people category.
