= Bijay Kumar Gachhadar =

Nepali politician

- विजय कुमार गच्छदार
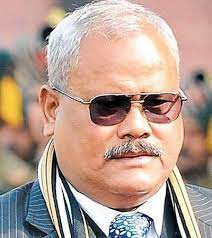
- Gachhadar as Home minister and Deputy Prime-minister

Vice-President of the Nepali Congress
- In office 2018 – 16 December 2021 Serving with Bimalendra Nidhi
- Preceded by: Ram Chandra Paudel
- Succeeded by: Dhanraj Gurung

Deputy Prime Minister of Nepal
- In office 25 May 2009 – 6 February 2011 Serving with Sujata Koirala
- President: Ram Baran Yadav
- Prime Minister: Madhav Kumar Nepal
- In office 4 September 2011 – 14 March 2013
- President: Ram Baran Yadav
- Prime Minister: Baburam Bhattarai
- In office 12 October 2015 – 4 August 2016
- President: Ram Baran Yadav; Bidhya Devi Bhandari
- Prime Minister: KP Oli
- In office 8 May 2017 – 31 May 2017
- President: Bidhya Devi Bhandari
- Prime Minister: Puspa Kamal Dahal
- In office 7 June 2017 – 15 February 2018
- President: Bidhya Devi Bhandari
- Prime Minister: Sher Bahadur Deuba

Minister for Physical Planning and Transport
- In office 18 August 2008 – 25 May 2009
- President: Ram Baran Yadav
- Prime Minister: Puspa Kamal Dahal
- In office 25 May 2009 – 6 February 2011
- President: Ram Baran Yadav
- Prime Minister: Madhav Kumar Nepal
- In office 12 October 2015 – 4 August 2016
- President: Ram Baran Yadav: Bidhya Devi Bhandari
- Prime Minister: KP Oli

Minister of Federal Affairs and Local Development
- In office 8 May 2017 – 31 May 2017
- President: Bidhya Devi Bhandari
- Prime Minister: Pushpa Kamal Dahal
- In office 7 June 2017 – 15 February 2018
- President: Bidhya Devi Bhandari
- Prime Minister: Sher Bahadur Deuba

Minister of Home Affairs
- In office 4 September 2011 – 14 March 2013
- President: Ram Baran Yadav
- Prime Minister: Baburam Bhattarai
- Preceded by: Krishna Bahadur Mahhara
- Succeeded by: Madhav Ghimir

Member of the Parliament, Pratinidhi Sabha
- In office 4 March 2018 – 17 September 2022 (suspended since 5 February 2020)
- Preceded by: Himself (as member of the Legislature Parliament)
- Constituency: Sunsari 3
- In office May 1991 – May 2002
- Preceded by: Constituency created
- Succeeded by: Himself (as member of the Constituent Assembly)
- Constituency: Sunsari 2

Member of the Constituent Assembly
- In office 28 May 2008 – 14 October 2017
- Preceded by: Himself (as member of the House of Representatives)
- Succeeded by: Himself (as member of the House of Representatives)
- Constituency: Sunsari 3

Chairperson of the Madhesi Jana Adhikar Forum, Nepal (Democratic)
- In office 2008–2017
- Preceded by: Party created
- Succeeded by: Party dissolved(merger with Rastriya Janamukti Party (Democratic) Nepal and Dalit Janajati Party, Nepal)

Chairperson of the Nepal Loktantrik Forum
- In office 5 April 2017 – 16 October 2017
- Preceded by: Party created
- Succeeded by: Party dissolved(joined Nepali Congress)

Personal details
- Born: 1 February 1954 (age 72) Sunsari, Nepal
- Party: Nepali Congress (17 October 2017 –present)
- Other political affiliations: Nepali Congress (before 2008); Madhesi Jana Adhikar Forum, Nepal (2008-2009); Madheshi Jana Adhikar Forum, Nepal (Democratic) (2009-2017); Nepal Democratic Forum
- Spouse: Nirmala Gachchhadar
- Occupation: Politician
- Ethnicity: Tharu

Bijay Kumar Gachhadar (Nepali: बिजयकुमार गच्छदार; born 1 February 1954) is a Nepalese politician and former leader of the Nepali Congress. He has served five terms as deputy prime minister of Nepal under the government of Madhav Kumar Nepal, Baburam Bhattarai, KP Sharma Oli, Pushpa Kamal Dahal and Sher Bahadur Deuba. He was the second vice-president of Nepali Congress having been nominated after merger of Nepal Loktantrik Forum into Nepali Congress.

== Political career ==
In April 2008, he won the Constituent Assembly election, 2013 with 23769 votes. Gachhadar was previously in the Madhesi people forum and Nepali Congress (Democratic), and was Minister of Water Resources. Gachhadar was formally expelled from Nepali Congress in March 2008, by that time he had already joined PRF. He was subsequently appointed as Minister and sworn in on 22 August 2008.

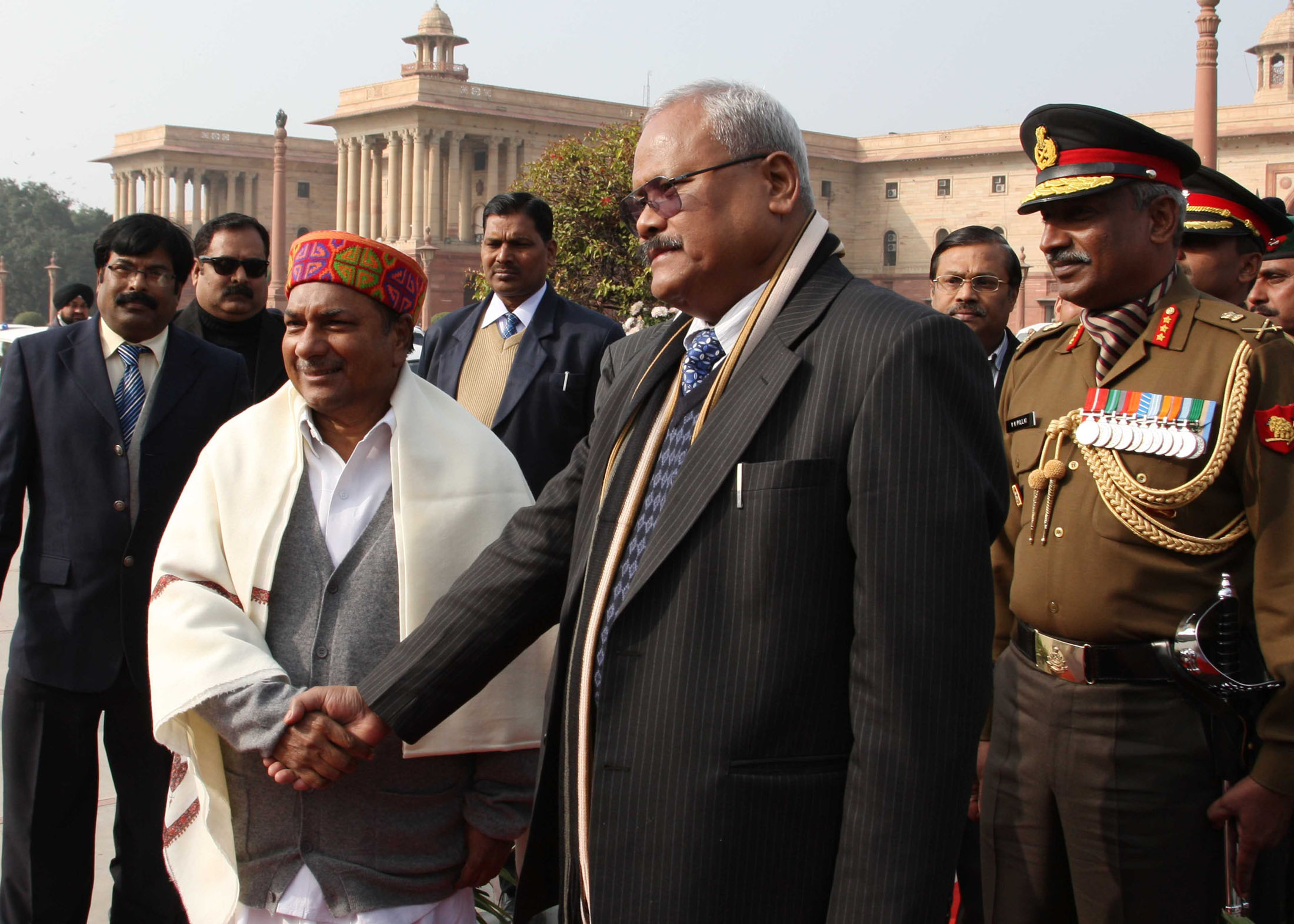
The Defence Minister, Shri A. K. Antony receiving the Deputy Prime Minister, Home and Defence Minister of Nepal, Bijay Gachhadar, in New Delhi on 18 January 2012

On 4 June 2009 he was appointed as the deputy prime minister for the first time keeping in consideration his contribution to establish Madhav Kumar Nepal's administration.

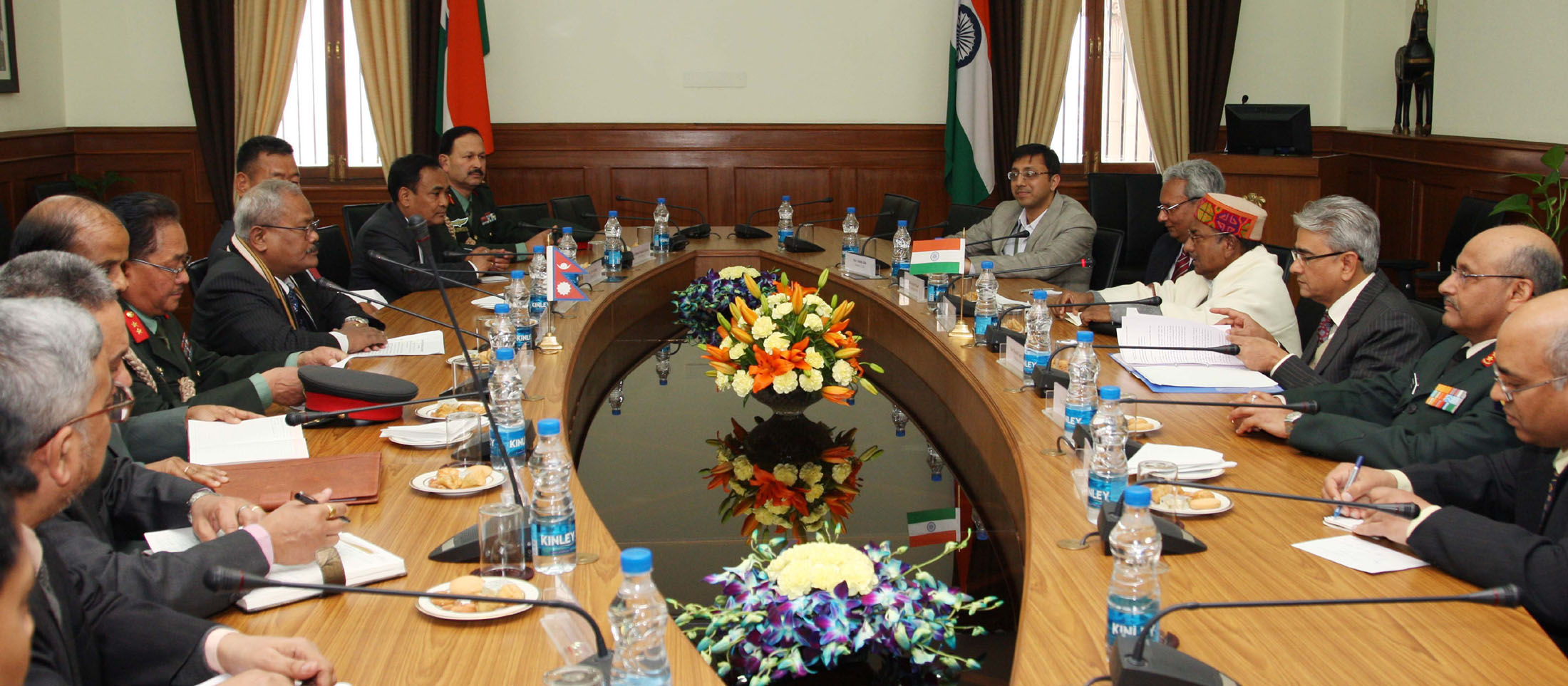
The Defence Minister, Shri A. K. Antony in a meeting with the Deputy Prime Minister, Home and Defence Minister of Nepal, Bijay Gachhadar, in New Delhi on 18 January 2012

Again as per the poll in the cabinet, he was again appointed as the Deputy Prime minister and Minister of Home Affairs in the government led by Prime Minister Baburam Bhattarai. On 16 October 2017 his party Nepal Democratic Forum merged with Nepali Congress. He was nominated Vice-president of Nepali Congress alongside Bimalendra Nidhi till 2021.

He was suspended from member of parliament on 5 February 2020 due to corruption charges for which he was acquitted in 2024 as innocent by special court.

== Electoral history ==
Election	House	Constituency	Party	Votes	Opponent	Party	Votes	Result
1991	House of Representatives	Sunsari 2	Nepali Congress	27,775	Lila Shrestha	CPN (UML)	15,885	Elected
1994	House of Representatives	Sunsari 2	Nepali Congress	21,963	Kuldeep Peshkar	CPN (UML)	10,708	Elected
1999	House of Representatives	Sunsari 2	Nepali Congress	27,527	Rewati Raman Bhandari	CPN (UML)	23,339	Elected
2008	Constituent Assembly	Sunsari 3	MJF-N (Loktantrik)	23,769	Agam Lal Chuadhary	Nepali Congress	10,806	Elected
2013	Constituent Assembly	Sunsari 3	MJF-N (Loktantrik)	17,524	Bhagwati Chaudhary	CPN (UML)	17,162	Elected
2017	House of Representatives	Sunsari 3	Nepali Congress	38,972	Bhagwati Chaudhary	CPN (UML)	38,651	Elected
2022	House of Representatives	Sunsari 3	Nepali Congress	35,600	Bhagwati Chaudhary	CPN (UML)	40,788	Lost

== See also ==
- Kamal Thapa
- Bimalendra Nidhi
- Prakash Man Singh
- Gopal Man Shrestha
- Upendra Yadav
- Ram Chandra Poudel
- Jitendra Narayan Dev
