= Communist Party of Nepal (Marxist–Leninist) (2002) =

Political party in Nepal

Communist Party of Nepal (Marxist–Leninist) नेपाल कम्युनिष्ट पार्टी (मार्क्सवादी-लेनिनवादी)
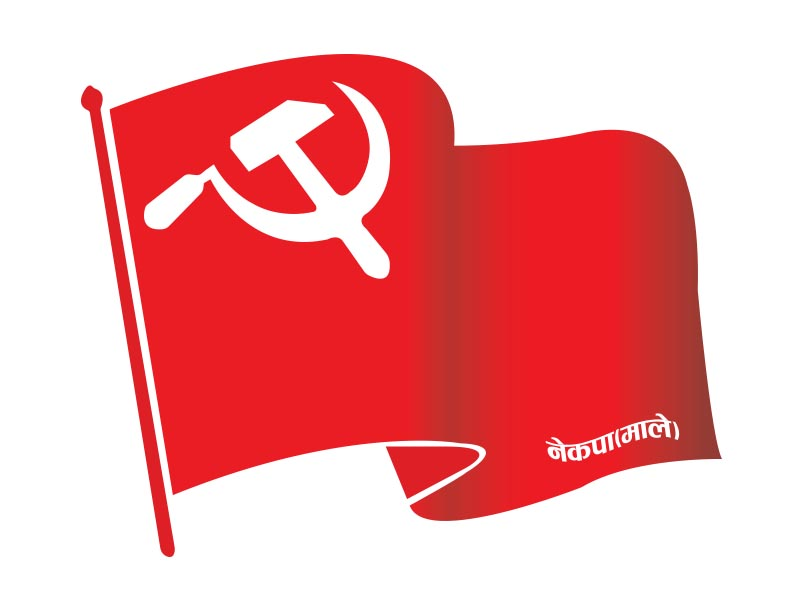
- General Secretary: CP Mainali
- Spokesperson: Kumar Belbase
- Founder: CP Mainali
- Founded: 17 February 2002 (24 years ago)
- Preceded by: CPN (Marxist–Leninist)
- Headquarters: Rudranagar Marg-359, Ratopul, Kathmandu, Nepal
- Ideology: Communism; Marxism–Leninism
- Political position: Left-wing

Election symbol
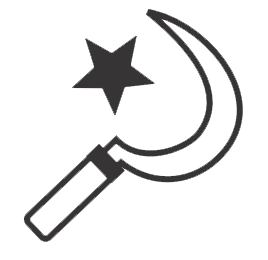

Website
- www.cpnml.org.np

The Communist Party of Nepal (Marxist–Leninist) is a Marxist-Leninist communist political party in Nepal. It was formed by Chandra Prakash Mainali when the Communist Party of Nepal (Marxist–Leninist) reunified with Communist Party of Nepal (Unified Marxist–Leninist). Mainali had refused to go along with the merger and led a faction of the former Communist Party of Nepal (Marxist–Leninist) to reorganize the party.

== History ==
=== Background ===
When the Communist Party of Nepal (Marxist–Leninist) merged with the Communist Party of Nepal (Unified Marxist–Leninist) on 15 February 2002, Chandra Prakash Mainali along with other dissident members reorganized the Communist Party of Nepal (Marxist–Leninist). Mainali originally planned to continue the party under his leadership but had to reorganize the party after the former party notified the Election Commission of Nepal of their dissolution and dissolved all central level organization of the party.

=== Jan Andholan and Constituent Assembly (2006-2015) ===
CPN (ML) was a member of the United Left Front and participated in the 2006 Loktantra Andolan. The party suffered a leadership crisis when a dissident faction of the party led by Rishi Ram Kattel expelled party leader C.P. Mainali, accusing him of being a pro-royalist. The faction led by C.P. Mainali on the other hand expelled Rishi Ram Kattel and other dissident members. The faction led by Rishi Ram Kattel eventually merged with the Ram Singh Shrestha faction of Communist Party of Nepal (Unity Centre–Masal) and the Sitaram Tamang faction of Communist Party of Nepal (Marxist–Leninist–Maoist Centre) to form the Communist Party of Nepal (Unified).

Ahead of the 2008 Constituent Assembly election, the party presented a closed proportional representation list with 168 candidates, headed by C.P. Mainali. The party presented 116 candidates for first past the post seats. It won eight seats in the election, all of them through proportional representation, with about 1.33% of the vote. The party also had one member nominated to the Constituent Assembly.

On 6 August 2010, CPN (ML) suffered a split regarding supporting Pusha Kamal Dahal in the prime minister election. The split was led by former minister Jagat Bahadur Bogati and included four CA members. The new party was named Communist Party of Nepal Marxist–Leninist (Socialist).

In the 2013 Constituent Assembly election, the party won five seats under proportional representation. The party joined the cabinet under Khadga Prasad Oli on 5 November 2015. Chandra Prakash Mainali was made deputy prime minister and Minister for Women, Children and Social Welfare.

=== Federal Nepal (2017-present) ===
In the 2017 local elections, CPN (ML) only won four seats in local governments. The party also contested the 2017 legislative and provincial elections but failed to get any seats.

== Electoral performance ==
=== Nepalese Legislative Elections ===
Election	Leader	Votes		Seats		Position	Resulting government
Election	Leader	#	%	#	+/-	Position	Resulting government
2008	Chandra Prakash Mainali	243,545	2.27	8 / 575		7th	CPN (Maoist)–CPN (UML)–MJFN
2013	Chandra Prakash Mainali	130,300	1.38	5 / 575	▼3	▼10th	Congress–CPN (UML)–RPP
2017	Chandra Prakash Mainali	41,270	0.43	0 / 275	▼5	▼12th	CPN (UML)–CPN (Maoist Centre)
2022	Chandra Prakash Mainali	30,599	0.29	0 / 275	Steady	▼16th	CPN (Maoist Centre)–

== Leadership ==
=== General secretaries ===
- Chandra Prakash Mainali, 2002–present

== See also ==
- List of communist parties in Nepal
- Communist Party of Nepal (Marxist–Leninist) (1998)
- Communist Party of Nepal (Unified Marxist–Leninist)
