= Ministry of Co-operatives and Poverty Alleviation =

Government ministry of Nepal

- सहकारी तथा गरिबी निवारण मन्त्रालय सहकारी मन्त्रालय (संक्षिप्त)

Central Government Organization overview
- Formed: May 17, 2013; 13 years ago
- Dissolved: February 23, 2018
- Type: Government
- Jurisdiction: Development of Cooperatives and Coordinate the poverty alleviation programmes by different agencies.
- Headquarters: Singh Durbar, Kathmandu
- Minister responsible: Chitra Bahadur K.C.
- Central Government Organization executive: Shankar Prasad Adhikari, Secretary
- Key document: Government of Nepal Work Division Rules, 2069 BS/2013 AD revised in 2072 BS/2015 AD
- Website: mocpa.gov.np/index.php/en

Ministry of Co-operatives and Poverty Alleviation (Nepali: सहकारी तथा गरिबी निवारण मन्त्रालय) is a ministry of Nepal that governs policies and programmes for tackling poverty in the country. The current minister is Ek Nath Dhakal.
