= Nepal Loktantrik Forum =

Nepal Loktantrik Forum नेपाल लोकतान्त्रिक फोरम
- Abbreviation: NLF
- Chairperson: Bijay Kumar Gachhadar
- Founded: 5 April 2017
- Dissolved: 16 October 2017
- Merger of: Madheshi Jana Adhikar Forum, Nepal (Loktantrik); Rastriya Janamukti Party (Democratic); Dalit Janajati Party, Nepal
- Merged into: Nepali Congress
- Headquarters: Subidhanagar, Tinkune, Kathmandu, Nepal
- Ideology: Secularism; Social democracy Social justice
- Political position: Centre-left

Election symbol
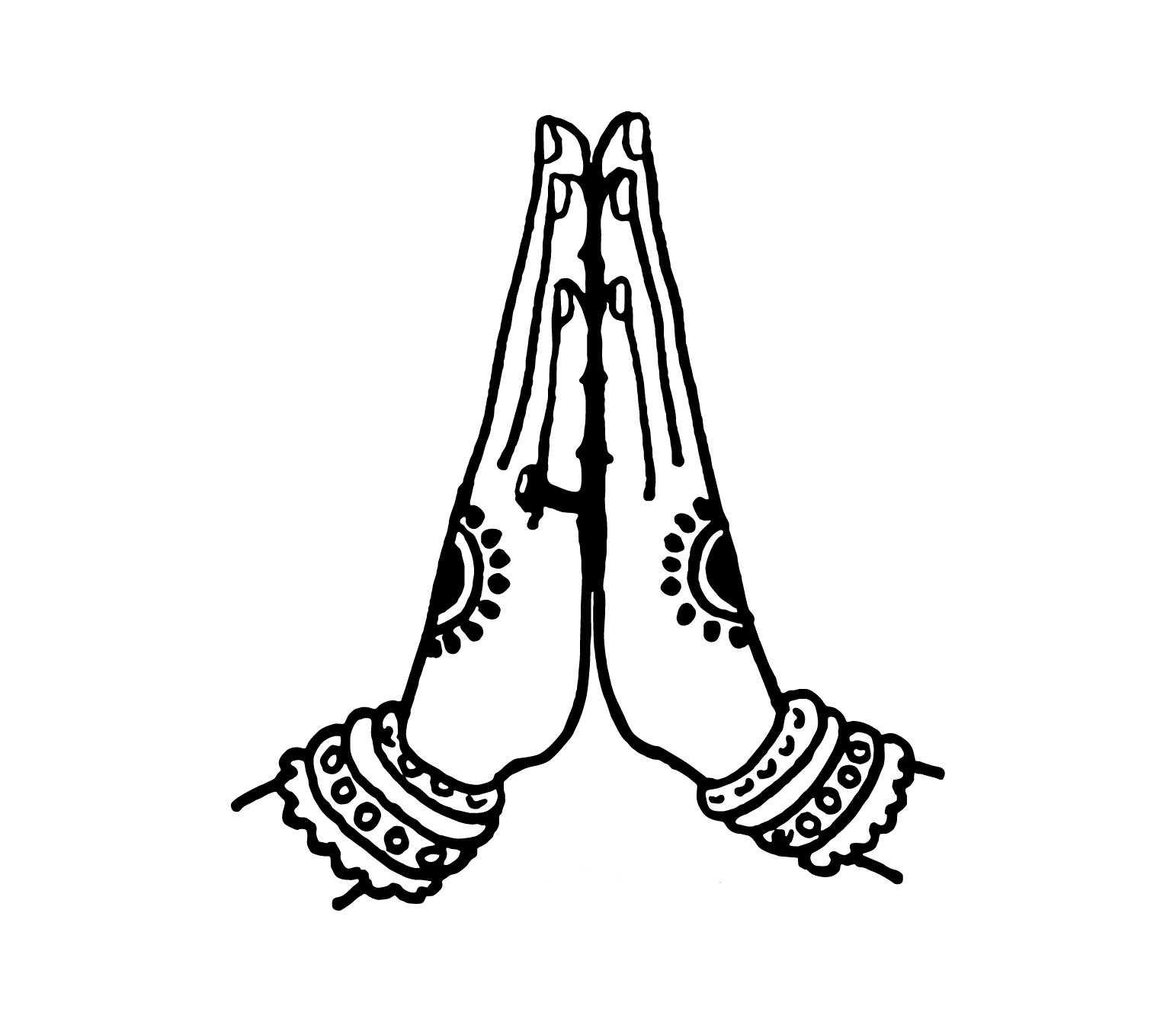

Party flag
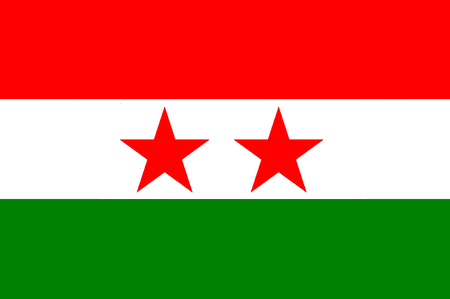

The Nepal Loktantrik Forum (translation: Nepal Democratic Forum) was a political party in Nepal. The party was established on April 5, 2017, after merging with the Madheshi Jana Adhikar Forum (Democratic), the Rastriya Janamukti Party (Democratic), and the Dalit Janajati Party.

On October 16, 2017, Nepal Loktantrik Forum merged into the Nepali Congress.

== History ==
The Nepal Democratic Forum underwent a series of frequent mergers between April and June 2017. First, the Tharuhat Tarai Party, led by Bhanu Ram Chaudhary, merged with the NLF on April 20, 2017. Three weeks later, on May 7, the Rastriya Janata Party, Nepal People's Party, United Nepal Republican People's Party, and Shanti Party Nepal all merged with the NLF as well. On June 2, the Liberal Democratic Party merged with the NLF, and on June 10 the Citizen Socialist Party also joined.

The party joined the Pushpa Kamal Dahal led government on May 8, with Bijay Kumar Gachhadar as Deputy Prime Minister and Minister for Federal Affairs and Local Development; Jitendra Dev as Minister for Tourism and Civil Aviation; and Gopal Dahit as the Minister for Land Reforms and Management.

On June 3, the party chairman Bijay Kumar Gachhadar supported the proposal of Pushpa Kamal Dahal to endorse Sher Bahadur Deuba as Prime Minister. Then, he joined the Sher Bahadur Deuba-led cabinet on June 7 as Deputy Prime Minister and Minister of Federal Affairs and Local Development.

=== Local elections and dissolution ===
Since the party was not registered as Nepal Democratic Forum before the deadline was set by the Election Commission, the party contested as Madheshi People's Right Forum, Nepal (Democratic) during the first phase of the 2017 elections. Initially, 334 party candidates filed for nomination, out of which six members were eventually elected. In the third phase of the elections, 166 candidates were elected including three candidates in the mayoral post.

The party merged into Nepali Congress on 16 October 2017 before the legislative and provincial elections. Party members of the former Rastriya Janamukti Party (Democratic), Dalit Janajati Party and Nepal Nagarik Party opposed the merger and contested the legislative and provincial elections under the Federal Socialist Forum, Nepal.

== See also ==
- List of political parties in Nepal
- Dalit Janajati Party
