= 2nd Nepalese Constituent Assembly =

Second Constituent Assembly of Nepal (2014–2017)

Second Constituent Assembly of Nepal
| ← | 1st Constituent Assembly | Federal Parliament | → |
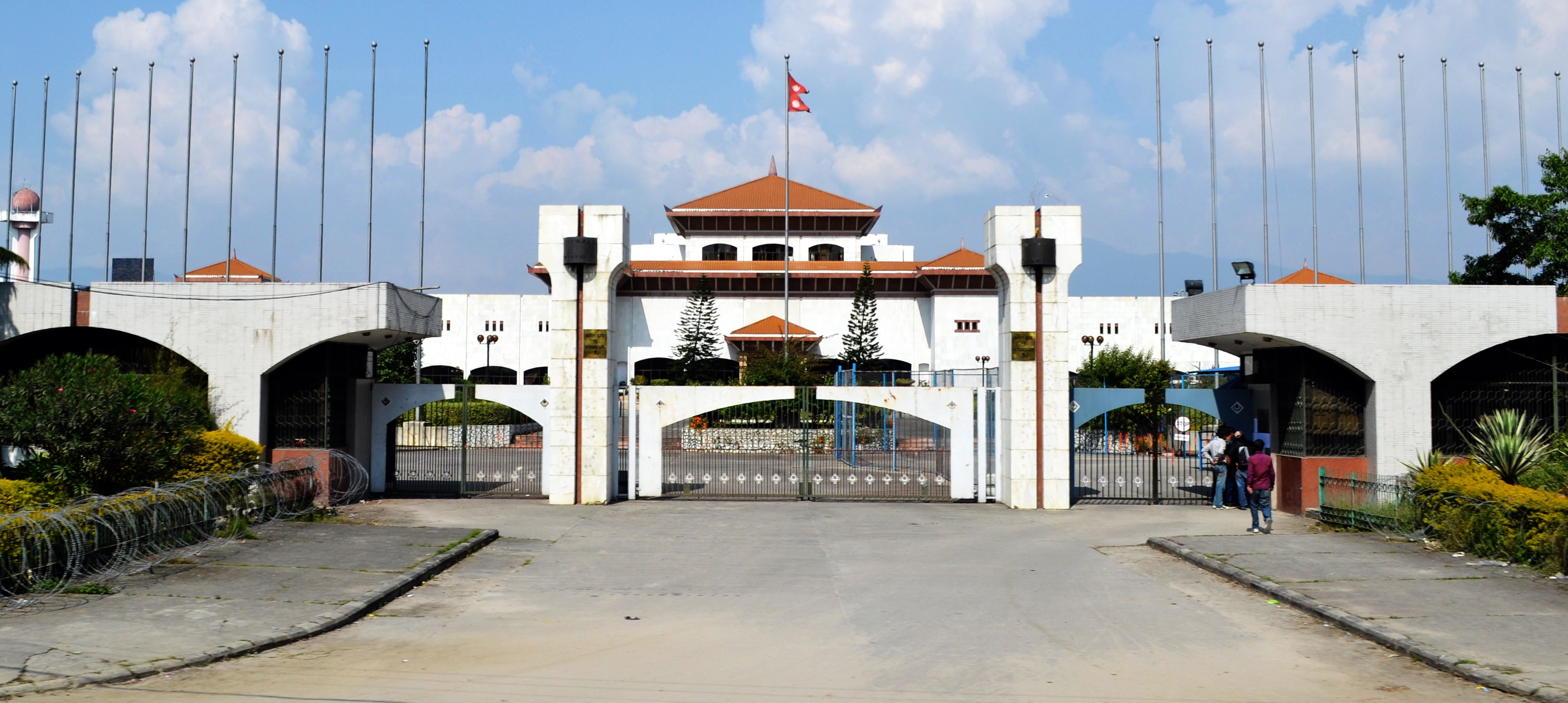
- International Convention Centre, Nepal

Overview
- Legislative body: Constituent Assembly of Nepal
- Meeting place: International Convention Centre
- Term: 2014 – 2017
- Election: 2013 Nepalese Constituent Assembly election
- Government: Sushil Koirala cabinet First Oli cabinet Second Dahal cabinet Fourth Deuba cabinet
- Members: 601

The Second Constituent Assembly of Nepal, later converted to the Legislature Parliament (Nepali: व्यवस्थापिका संसद), was a unicameral legislature of Nepal. It was elected in the 2013 Constituent Assembly elections after the failure of the first Constituent Assembly (CA) to promulgate a new constitution. The Assembly converted into a legislative parliament after the constitution was promulgated in 2015. The legislature parliament's term ended on 14 October 2017.

== Opening ==
Former Prime Minister Surya Bahadur Thapa, the oldest member of the house, assumed chairmanship of the CA on January 20, 2014 and administered the oath of office to 565 lawmakers at the first meeting of the assembly on January 21, 2014. Leaders of the Nepali Congress (NC), Communist Party of Nepal (Unified Marxist–Leninist) (CPN-UML) and Unified Communist Party of Nepal (Maoist) (UCPN (Maoist)) pledged to draft a new constitution within a year. More than 80% of the members were new faces.

== Power-sharing discussions ==
On January 26, 2014, President Ram Baran Yadav called for the election of a Prime Minister and the formation of a consensus government within a week as per article 38(1) of the constitution which provided for the formation of government through political understanding. The Nepali Congress obtained the support of the CPN-UML for a NC-led consensus government and the two parties also agreed to hold local body elections within six months and adopt a new constitution within a year. An all-party meeting followed at which the CPN-UML, UCPN (Maoist) and MPRF-Loktantrik expressed support for a government under Sushil Koirala. The Rashtriya Prajatantra Party Nepal (RPP-N) boycotted the meeting. Further discussions were held between the NC, CPN-UML and UCPN (Maoist) at which the Maoists expressed support for the idea of a NC-led government but did not agree to join the government and decided to stay in opposition. On February 2, 2014, the NC abandoned its pursuit of a consensus government under article 38(1) of the constitution after the UCPN (Maoist) and RPP-N, the third and fourth largest parties, decided not to join the government. The party then initiated talks with the CPN-UML to form a majority government under article 38(2) of the constitution.

== Composition ==
A total of thirty political parties and two independents were represented at the start of the second constituent assembly. However, some parties later merged and the number of parties declined.

| Party | Leader in Parliament | Seats |
|---|---|---|
| Nepali Congress | Sher Bahadur Deuba | 207 |
| Communist Party of Nepal (Unified Marxist–Leninist) | K. P. Sharma Oli | 181 |
| Communist Party of Nepal (Maoist-Centre) | Pushpa Kamal Dahal | 82 |
| Rastriya Prajatantra Party | Kamal Thapa | 37 |
| Rastriya Janata Party Nepal | Mahendra Yadav | 24 |
| Nepal Democratic Forum | Bijay Kumar Gachhadar | 18 |
| Federal Socialist Forum Nepal | Ashok Rai | 15 |
| Communist Party of Nepal (Marxist–Leninist) | CP Mainali | 5 |
| Nepal Workers Peasants Party | Narayan Man Bijukchhe | 4 |
| Rastriya Janamorcha | Chitra Bahadur K.C. | 3 |
| Communist Party of Nepal (United) | Sunil Babu Pant | 3 |
| Nepal Pariwar Dal | Ek Nath Dhakal | 2 |
| Akhanda Nepal Party | Kumar Khadka | 1 |
| Nepali Janata Dal | Hari Charan Sah | 1 |
| Khambuwan Rastriya Morcha, Nepal | Ram Kumar Rai | 1 |
| Bouddhik Prajatantrik Parishad | Laxman Rajbanshi | 1 |
| Jana Jagaran Party Nepal | Lokmani Dhakal | 1 |
| Sanghiya Sadbhawna Party | Dimple Kumari Jha | 1 |
| Socialist People's Party | Prem Bahadur Singh | 1 |
| Federal Democratic National Forum (Tharuhat) | Rukmini Chaudhary | 1 |
| Bahujan Shakti Party | Biswendra Paswan | 1 |
| Naya Shakti Party, Nepal | Ganga Satgauwa Chaudhary | 1 |
| Independents | - | 2 |

== Committees ==
The following parliamentary committees were formed:

- State Affairs Committee
- Public Accounts Committee
- Environment Protection Committee
- International Relations and Labour Committee
- Legislation Committee
- Good Governance and Monitoring Committee
- Industry Commerce and Consumer Welfare Committee
- Women, Children, Senior Citizen and Social Welfare Committee
- Development Committee
- Agriculture and Water Resources Committee
- Finance Committee
- Parliamentary Hearing Special Committee

== See also ==
- List of members elected in the 2013 Nepalese Constituent Assembly election
