= List of members elected in the 2008 Nepalese Constituent Assembly election =

1st Constituent Assembly of Nepal
←	Interim Legislature	2nd CA	→
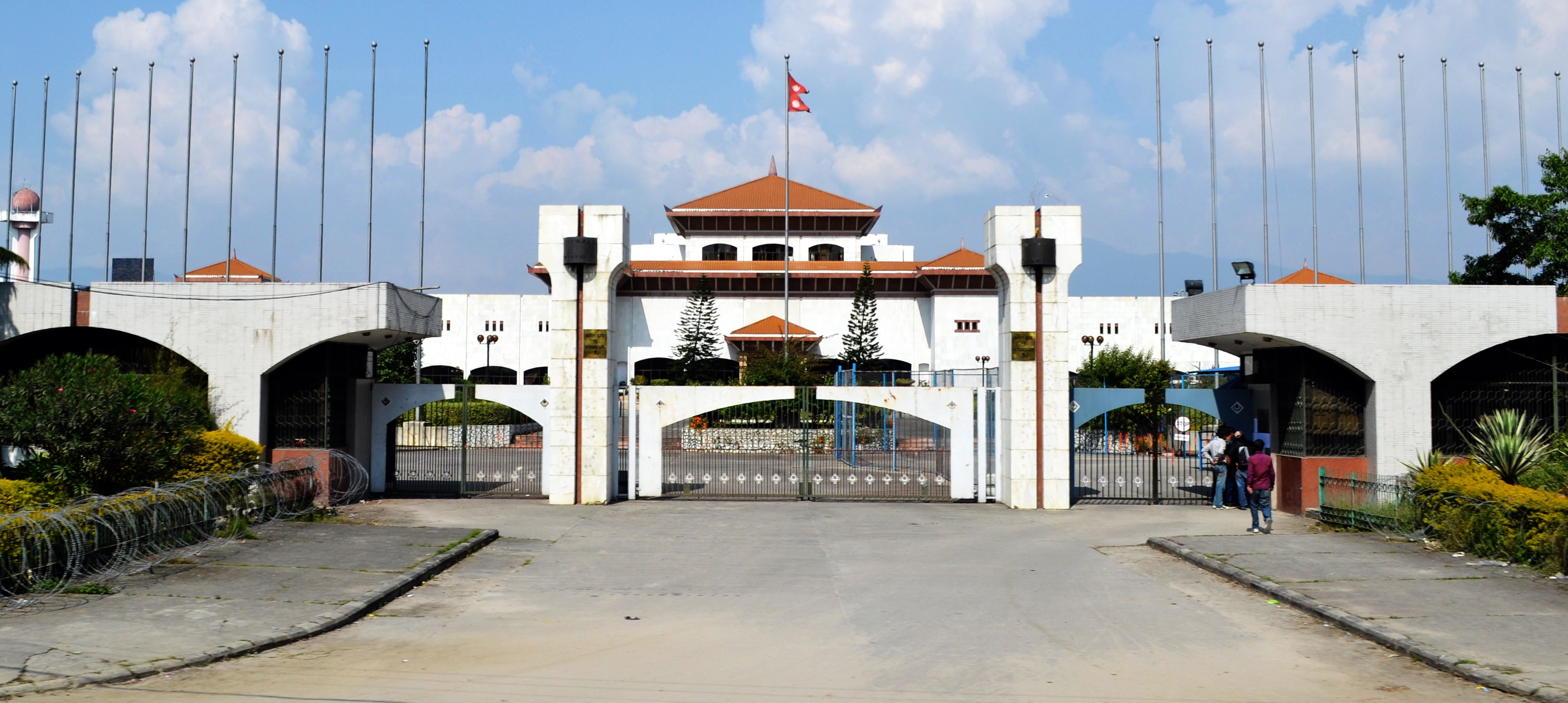
- International Convention Centre, Nepal

Overview
- Legislative body: Constituent Assembly
- Jurisdiction: Nepal
- Meeting place: International Convention Centre, Nepal
- Term: 28 May 2008 – 28 May 2012
- Election: 2008 Constituent Assembly election
- Government: First Dahal cabinet Madhav Nepal cabinet Khanal cabinet Bhattarai cabinet

Constituent Assembly
- Members: 601
- Chairperson: Subas Chandra Nemwang (UML)
- Deputy Chairperson: Purna Kumari Subedi (Maoist)
- Prime Minister: Pushpa Kamal Dahal (Maoist); Madhav Kumar Nepal (UML); Jhala Nath Khanal (UML); Baburam Bhattarai (Maoist)

This is a list of members elected to the 1st Nepalese Constituent Assembly at the 2008 Nepalese Constituent Assembly election and subsequent by-elections.

The list is arranged by constituency for members elected through direct elections and by last name for members elected through the party list. Subas Chandra Nemwang served as chairman, Pushpa Kamal Dahal, Madhav Kumar Nepal, Jhala Nath Khanal and Baburam Bhattarai served as prime ministers.

== Constituent Assembly composition ==
1st Constituent Assembly of Nepal

Constituent Assembly at dissolution in 2012

Constituent Assembly at start of term

Party	Members		
Party	After election	At dissolution	Change
UCPN (Maoist) (Note: CPN (Maoist) and Janamorcha Nepal merged to form UCPN (Maoist))	229	236	▲7
Nepali Congress	115	114	▼1
CPN (UML)	108	108	Steady
MJFN (Loktantrik)	—	27	▲27
Madheshi Jana Adhikar Forum (Republican)	—	14	▲14
Madheshi Jana Adhikar Forum, Nepal	54	11	▼43
Terai Madhesh Loktantrik Party	21	11	▼10
Terai Madhesh Loktantrik Party Nepal	—	9	▲9
Rastriya Prajatantra Party	8	8	Steady
CPN (Marxist–Leninist)	9	5	▼4
CPN (United)	5	5	Steady
NMKP	5	5	Steady
Sanghiya Sadbhavana Party	—	5	▲5
CPN (Marxist–Leninist–Socialist)	—	4	▲4
Rastriya Janamorcha	4	4	Steady
Rastriya Prajatantra Party Nepal	4	4	Steady
Rastriya Janashakti Party	3	3	Steady
CPN (Unified)	2	2	Steady
Nepal Sadbhavana Party (Anandidevi)	3	2	▼1
Rastriya Janamukti Party	2	2	Steady
Rastriya Sadbhavana Party	—	2	▲2
Sadbhavana Party	9	2	▼7
Churebhawar Rastriya Ekta Party	1	1	Steady
Dalit Janajati Party	1	1	Steady
Nawa Nepal Nirman Party	—	1	▲1
Nepa Rastriya Party	1	1	Steady
Loktantrik Samajbadi Dal	1	1	Steady
Nepal Pariwar Dal	1	1	Steady
Nepali Janata Dal	2	1	▼1
Nepal Janata Dal (United)	—	1	▲1
Samajbadi Janata Party (Note: Samajbadi Prajatantrik Janata Party, Nepal renamed to Samajbadi Janata Party)	1	1	Steady
Sanghiya Loktantrik Rastriya Manch (Tharuhat)	—	1	▲1
Janamorcha Nepal	8	—	▼1
Sanghiya Loktantrik Rastriya Manch	2	0	▼2
Independent	2	2	Steady
Vacant	—	6	▲6
Total	601	601	

== List of members elected by party ==
UCPN (Maoist)
Directly elected
Constituency	Member
Jhapa 1	Dharma Prasad Ghimire
Jhapa 2	Gauri Shankar Khadka
Jhapa 3	Purna Prasad Rajbanshi
Jhapa 4	Dharmashila Chapagain
Jhapa 7	Bishwadip Lingden Limbu
Sankhuwasabha 1	Purna Prasad Rai
Bhojpur 1	Padam Bahadur Rai
Bhojpur 2	Sudan Kirati
Dhankuta 1	Hem Raj Bhandari
Dhankuta 2	Hari Raj Limbu
Morang 2	Lal Bahadur Susling Magar
Morang 3	Sabitri Kumar Kafle
Morang 8	Gopi Bahadur Sarki
Morang 9	Nagendra Bahadur Dhimal
Sunsari 1	Kiran Kumar Rai
Solukhumbu 1	Gopal Kirati
Khotang 1	Ram Kumar Rai
Khotang 2	Samita Karki
Okhaldhunga 1	Keshav Rai
Okhaldhunga 2	Bal Krishna Dhungel
Udayapur 2	Mani Khambu Kirati
Udayapur 3	Mohan Bahadur Khatri
Siraha 5	Mahendra Paswan
Dolakha 1	Devi Khadka
Dolakha 2	Hem Bahadur Shrestha
Ramechhap 1	Tara Narayan Shrestha
Ramechhap 2	Dilli Man Tamang
Sindhuli 2	Chandra Prakash Gajurel
Sindhuli 3	Nir Kumari Kunwar
Mahottari 1	Giriraj Mani Pokharel
Rasuwa 1	Prem Bahadur Tamang
Dhading 1	Pushpa Bikram Malla
Dhading 2	Kalpana Dhamala
Dhadhing 3	Shalikram Jamkattel
Nuwakot 1	Bimala Subedi
Nuwakot 3	Posht Bahadur Bogati
Kathmandu 2	Jhakku Prasad Subedi
Kathmandu 6	Hit Man Shakya
Kathmandu 7	Hisila Yami
Kathmandu 10	Pushpa Kamal Dahal
Lalitpur 1	Barsha Man Pun
Lalitpur 2	Raj Kaji Maharjan
Lalitpur 3	Pampha Bhusal
Kavrepalanchok 1	Surya Man Dong Tamang
Kavrepalanchok 2	Akal Bahadur Thing
Kavrepalanchok 4	Tej Bahadur Mijar
Sindhupalchok 1	Raj Kumar Shrestha
Sindhupalchok 2	Agni Prasad Sapkota
Sindhupalchok 3	Dawa Tama
Makwanpur 1	Dil Bahadur Ghising
Makwanpur 2	Prem Bahadur Pulami
Makwanpur 3	Pralhad Lamichhane
Makwanpur 4	Kumari Muktan
Rautahat 3	Prabhu Sah Teli
Rautahat 6	Devendra Prasad Patel
Bara 2	Shiva Chandra Prasad Kushwaha
Bara 6	Jay Ram Dahal
Chitwan 2	Ram Bahadur Thapa
Chitwan 3	Narayan Prasad Dahal
Chitwan 4	Chitra Bahadur Shrestha
Chitwan 5	Amik Sherchan
Gorkha 1	Parbati Thapa Shrestha
Gorkha 2	Baburam Bhattarai
Gorkha 3	Amar Bahadur Gurung
Manang 1	Dev Prasad Gurung
Lamjung 1	Buddhiram Gurung
Kaski 1	Krishna Bahadur Gurung
Kaski 2	Raj Kaji Gurung
Kaski 4	Durga Kumari B.K.
Tanahun 1	Suresh Kumar Ale Magar
Gulmi 1	Sudarshan Baral
Gulmi 3	Chandra Bahadur Thapa
Palpa 2	Lila Kumari Wagle
Arghakhanchi 1	Top Bahadur Rayamajhi
Nawalparasi 3	Sita Devi Baudel
Nawalparasi 4	Chinak Kurmi
Rupandehi 1	Ghanashyam Yadav Ahir
Myagdi 1	Govinda Paudel
Parbat 2	Gunakhar Basyal
Rukum 1	Jun Kumari Roka
Rukum 2	Janardan Sharma
Rolpa 1	Jaypuri Gharti
Rolpa 2	Santosh Kumar Budha Magar
Pyuthan 1	Narayan Prasad Adhikari
Pyuthan 2	Dipak Bahadur K.C.
Salyan 1	Tek Bahadur Basnet
Salyan 2	Uma Kant Sharma
Dang 1	Indrajit Tharu
Dang 2	Dama Kumari Sharma
Dang 3	Krishna Bahadur Mahara
Dang 4	Shiva Raj Gautam
Dang 5	Shushma Sharma Ghimire
Dolpa 1	Ram Bahadur Bohora
Mugu 1	Navraj Dhami
Jumla 1	Naresh Bhandari
Kalikot 1	Khadga Bahadur Bishwakarma
Humla 1	Karna Jit Budhathoki
Jajarkot 1	Kali Bahadur Malla
Jajarkot 2	Bhakta Bahadur Shah
Surkhet 3	Nar Bahadur Bista
Banke 1	Tilak Pariyar
Banke 4	Purna Kumari Subedi
Bardiya 1	Sarala Regmi
Bardiya 2	Bishnu Prasad Chaudhary
Bardiya 3	Sant Kumar Tharu
Bardiya 4	Ram Charan Chaudhary
Achham 2	Sharad Singh Bhandari
Bajhang 2	Shankar Bahadur Khadka
Doti 2	Khem Bahadur Bam
Kailali 1	Rupa Chaudhary
Kailali 2	Bhagat Bahadur Badhuwal
Kailali 3	Bir Man Chaudhary
Kailali 4	Krishna Kumar Chaudhary
Kailali 5	Lekh Raj Bhatta
Kailali 6	Lila Kumari Bhandari
Darchula 1	Laxman Dutt Joshi
Baitadi 1	Narendra Bahadur Kunwar
Baitadi 2	Renu Chand
Kanchanpur 1	Puran Rana Tharu
Kanchanpur 2	Devi Lal Chaudhary
Kanchanpur 3	Tekendra Prasad Bhatt
Kanchanpur 4	Harish Thakulla
Party list
PR group	Member
Indigenous peoples	Dhruba Aangdambe
Indigenous peoples	Shramner Anand
Dalit, Backward area	Dharma Raj B.K.
Dalit	Mangal B.K.
Madheshi, Dalit	Rupa B.K.
Dalit	Santoshi B.K.
Khas Arya	Ek Raj Bhandari
Indigenous peoples	Uma Bhujel
Dalit	Padam Lal Bishwakarma
Khas Arya	Uma Karki Bista
Madheshi/Indigenous peoples	Laxmi Kumari Chaudhary
Madheshi/Indigenous peoples	Sukdaiya Chaudhary
Khas Arya	Renuka Chaulagain
Madheshi/Indigenous peoples	Maya Chepang
Khas Arya	Ashok Kumar Rokaya Chhetri
Khas Arya	Ishwari Prasad Dahal
Khas Arya	Renu Dahal
Madheshi/Indigenous peoples	Indrawati Adhikari Danuwar
Madheshi	Chanda Devi
Khas Arya	Khim Lal Devkota
Khas Arya	Shriram Dhakal
Madheshi/Indigenous peoples	Bhishma Dhimal
Madheshi	Islam Miya Dhobi
Dalit	Bishwa Bhakta Dulal
Indigenous peoples	Sabitra Gurung Dura
Khas Arya	Bhim Prasad Gautam
Khas Arya	Sharada Ghimire
Indigenous peoples	Laxmi Gurung
Khas Arya	Yashoda Gurung (Subedi)
Madheshi	Abhi Lal Jhagad
Indigenous peoples	Birendra Jwarchan
Khas Arya	Bimala K.C.
Indigenous peoples	Suila Kandangwa
Indigenous peoples	Uma Gothe Kapali
Khas Arya	Pooja Khanal
Madheshi	Gyanendra Kumal
Indigenous peoples, Backward area	Tsimi Lama
Indigenous peoples	Sancha Pal Maden
Indigenous peoples	Amrita Thapa Magar
Indigenous peoples	Gam Bahadur Shris Magar
Indigenous peoples	Lokendra Bista Magar
Indigenous peoples	Onsari Gharti Magar
Indigenous peoples	Ram Bahadur Thapa Magar
Indigenous peoples	Tara Gharti Magar
Indigenous peoples	Dilip Maharjan
Madheshi	Budhani Devi Mahato
Madheshi	Sunita Kumari Mahato
Madheshi	Tul Bahadur Majhi
Khas Arya	Jokh Bahadur Mehra
Madheshi/Indigenous peoples	Liladevi Mehta
Dalit	Bimala Mijar
Khas Arya	Mohammad Safiq Miya
Indigenous peoples	Satya Lal Mool
Khas Arya	Keshav Prasad Nepal
Khas Arya	Santa Neupane
Khas Arya	Kuber Bahadur Oli
Madheshi, Dalit	Binod Pahadi
Khas Arya, Backward area	Satya Pahadi
Indigenous peoples	Khusi Ram Pakhrin
Khas Arya	Ganga Parajuli
Madheshi, Dalit	Babu Lal Paswan
Madheshi, Dalit	Durgi Devi Paswan
Khas Arya	Goma Pathak
Khas Arya	Narayan Prasad Paudel
Khas Arya	Sita Pokharel
Khas Arya	Nanda Kumar Prasai
Indigenous peoples	Bishnu Kumari Rai
Indigenous peoples	Durga Jayanti Rai
Indigenous peoples	Indra Jit Rai
Madheshi	Shanti Devi Rajbanshi
Dalit	Parshuram Ramtel
Indigenous peoples	Purna Bahadur Rana
Dalit	Parbati Rasaili
Indigenous peoples	Kamala Rokka
Madheshi	Jwala Kumari Sah
Madheshi	Lalita Kumari Sah
Khas Arya	Surya Bahadur Sen
Madheshi	Bharat Prasad Shah
Khas Arya	Bharat Kumari Regmi Sharma
Khas Arya	Dina Nath Sharma
Khas Arya	Maya Prasad Sharma
Indigenous peoples	Aang Dawa Sherpa
Indigenous peoples	Mahalaxmi Shrestha
Dalit	Hari Ram Sipaili
Madheshi	Halina Khatun Sokhin
Madheshi	Sidhhartha Somani
Madheshi	Jubba Soren
Khas Arya	Kalpana Devi Subedi
Khas Arya	Khuma Subedi
Dalit	Him Kumari Sunar
Indigenous peoples	Bir Bahadur Tamang
Indigenous peoples	Santa Maya Tamang
Khas Arya	Gita Thagunna
Indigenous peoples	Chun Bahadur Thami
Madheshi/Indigenous peoples	Pattu Tharu
Madheshi/Indigenous peoples	Sangh Prasad Tharu
Madheshi/Indigenous peoples	Santosh Tharu
Madheshi/Indigenous peoples	Sundara Tharu
Khas Arya, Backward area	Dhirendra Kumari Upadhyaya
Madheshi	Indramati Yadav
Madheshi	Pramila Devi Yadav
Madheshi	Ram Kumar Yadav
Madheshi	Shiva Ram Yadav
Nominated
Sabina Baram
Indra Maya Gurung
Padam Jyoti
Nima Lama
Hari Lal Thapa Magar
Chandra Lal Meche
Sher Bahadur Pahadi
Hari Rokka
Dabal Bahadur Shah
Narayan Kaji Shrestha

Nepali Congress
Directly elected
Constituency	Member
Taplejung 1	Surya Man Gurung
Panchthar 1	Purna Kumar Sharma
Ilam 3	Kul Bahadur Gurung
Jhapa 5	Keshav Kumar Budhathoki
Tehrathum 1	Tulsi Subba
Morang 1	Amod Prasad Upadhyaya
Morang 7	Shekhar Koirala
Udayapur 1	Narayan Khadka
Dhanusha 2	Ram Krishna Yadav
Dhanusha 3	Bimalendra Nidhi
Nuwakot 2	Ram Sharan Mahat
Kathmandu 1	Prakash Man Singh
Kathmandu 3	Chakra Bahadur Thakuri
Kathmandu 4	Suprabha Ghimire
Kathmandu 5	Narahari Acharya
Kathmandu 8	Nabindra Raj Joshi
Kathmandu 9	Dhyan Gobinda Ranjit
Rautahat 2	Mohammad Aftab Alam
Rautahat 4	Krishna Prasad Yadav
Bara 5	Umakant Chaudhary
Parsa 2	Ajay Kumar Dwivedi
Parsa 3	Ajay Kumar Chaurasiya
Parsa 5	Ramesh Rijal
Tanahun 2	Ram Chandra Paudel
Syangja 2	Gopal Man Shrestha
Syangja 3	Mohan Prasad Panday
Arghakhanchi 2	Pushpa Bhusal
Nawalparasi 1	Shashank Koirala
Nawalparasi 2	Mahendra Dhoj G.C.
Rupandehi 3	Bal Krishna Khand
Kapilvastu 1	Deep Kumar Upadhyaya
Baglung 3	Nar Bahadur Pun
Parbat 1	Arjun Prasad Joshi
Dailekh 1	Ganesh Bahadur Khadka
Bajura 1	Dev Raj Joshi
Dadeldhura 1	Sher Bahadur Deuba
Party list
PR group	Member
Khas Arya	Uma Adhikari (Regmi)
Indigenous peoples	Krishna Amatya
Khas Arya	Purushottam Basnet
Khas Arya	Ambika Basnet
Dalit	Khadga Bahadur Basyal (Sarki)
Madheshi/Indigenous people	Ramwati Chaudhary
Madheshi/Indigenous people	Saraswati Chaudhary
Indigenous peoples	Ram Krishna Chitrakar
Indigenous peoples	Tirtha Ram Dangol
Khas Arya	Arju Rana Deuba
Madheshi, Dalit	Shambhu Hajara Dusadh
Khas Arya	Laxman Prasad Ghimire
Khas Arya	Pradeep Giri
Madheshi	Diwakar Golchha
Madheshi	Munni Kumari Gupta
Madheshi/Indigenous people	Usha Guru
Khas Arya	Ram Gurugain
Indigenous peoples	Indra Bahadur Gurung
Indigenous peoples	Dhan Raj Gurung
Indigenous peoples	Sita Gurung
Indigenous peoples	Hira Gurung
Khas Arya, Backward area	Dudh Kumari Hamal
Madheshi	Minakshi Jha
Indigenous peoples	Sun Devi Joshi
Khas Arya	Jagadiswor Narsingh KC
Khas Arya	Purna Bahadur Khadka
Madheshi, Dalit	Bhotani Devi Khawas
Khas Arya	Girija Prasad Koirala
Madheshi	Badshah Kurmi
Indigenous peoples	Harsha Jit Lama
Khas Arya	Ramesh Lekhak
Indigenous peoples	Tika Ram Subba Lepcha
Indigenous peoples	Lalita Kingring Magar
Khas Arya	Prakash Sharan Mahat
Madheshi/Indigenous peoples	Manav Bahadur Mahato
Khas Arya	Baldev Sharma Majgaiya
Madheshi/Indigenous people	Birendra Majhi
Madheshi	Shiva Chandra Mishra
Dalit, Backward area	Maha Nepali
Dalit	Bimala Nepali
Khas Arya	Ishwari Neupane
Khas Arya	Mina Pandey
Khas Arya	Shobhakar Parajuli
Dalit	Laxmi Pariyar
Dalit	Krishna Kumari Pariyar
Khas Arya	Binod Paudel
Indigenous peoples	Nirmala Prasai
Indigenous peoples	Kumar Rai
Indigenous peoples	Gokarna Rai
Indigenous peoples	Pramila Rai
Madheshi/Indigenous people	Amrit Lal Rajbanshi
Madheshi	Rameshwar Prasad Rauniyar
Khas Arya	Min Prasad Rijal
Khas Arya	Kalyani Rijal
Madheshi, Dalit	Kabita Kumari Sardar
Madheshi	Om Prakash Sharma
Indigenous peoples	Ratna Sherchan
Indigenous peoples	Jeep Tshering Lama Sherpa
Indigenous peoples	Pasa Sherpa
Indigenous peoples	Jiwan Prem Shrestha
Madheshi	Mohammad Siddiqi
Madheshi	Sabitri Singh
Dalit	Kalpana Sob
Indigenous peoples	Lila Subba
Dalit	Chandri Ram Tamata
Madheshi	Krishna Thakur
Khas Arya	Gagan Thapa
Khas Arya	Kamala Thapa
Indigenous peoples	Urmila Thapa
Khas Arya	Mahalaxmi Aryal Upadhyaya
Madheshi	Ram Saroj Yadav
Madheshi	Mahendra Yadav
Madheshi	Kiran Yadav
Nominated
Nilambar Acharya
Kamala Pant
Jagat Bahadur Tajpuriya
Bishwanath Upadhyaya

CPN (Unified Marxist–Lenninist)
Directly elected
Constituency	Member
Taplejung 2	Dambar Dhoj Tumbahamphe
Panchthar 2	Dambar Singh Sambahamphe
Ilam 1	Jhala Nath Khanal
Ilam 2	Subas Chandra Nemwang
Jhapa 6	Dipak Karki
Sunsari 2	Dharma Raj Niraula
Sunsari 6	Bhim Prasad Acharya
Sindhuli 1	Bisham Lal Adhikari
Dhanusha 1	Ram Chandra Jha
Dhanusha 5	Raghubir Mahaseth
Dhanusha 7	Shatrudhan Mahato
Sarlahi 1	Prakash Pakhrin
Sarlahi 2	Mohammad Rizwan
Kavrepalanchok 3	Krishna Prasad Sapkota
Parsa 4	Praduman Prasad Chauhan
Chitwan 1	Lal Mani Chaudhary
Lamjung 2	Prithvi Subba Gurung
Kaski 3	Rabindra Prasad Adhikari
Tanahun 3	Kiran Gurung
Syangja 1	Hit Kaji Gurung
Gulmi 2	Pradeep Kumar Gyawali
Palpa 1	Dal Bahadur Rana
Palpa 3	Kul Prasad Nepal
Rupandehi 4	Bishnu Prasad Paudel
Rupandehi 5	Ram Nath Dhakal
Mustang 1	Chandra Bahadur Gurung
Baglung 1	Ramji Prasad Sharma
Dailekh 2	Raj Bahadur Budha Chhetri
Surkhet 1	Kamala Sharma
Surkhet 2	Yam Lal Kandel
Achham 1	Sher Bahadur Kunwar
Bajhang 1	Bhanu Bhakta Joshi
Doti 1	Harka Bahadur Singh
Party list
PR group	Member
Madheshi	Sheikh Abul Kalam Aazad
Khas Arya	Yasoda Devi Adhikari
Khas Arya	Narayani Devi Ghimire Aryal
Khas Arya	Padma Kumari Aryal
Khas Arya	Shanti Basnet (Adhikari)
Khas Arya	Sabitri Bhusal
Dalit	Bishnu Maya Bishwakarma
Dalit	Chhabi Lal Bishwakarma
Indigenous peoples	Gopal Singh Bohora
Madheshi	Shanti Devi Chamar
Madheshi	Binod Kumar Chaudhary
Madheshi	Shanta Chaudhary
Dalit	Puran Singh Dayal
Khas Arya	Jay Ghimire
Indigenous peoples	Ratna Gurung
Khas Arya	Bina Gyawali
Khas Arya	Radha Gyawali
Madheshi	Sharada Jha
Indigenous peoples	Shanti Jirel
Dalit	Bhaire Kami
Khas Arya	Bibha Kumari Karki
Khas Arya	Dol Bahadur Karki
Khas Arya	Yubaraj Karki
Khas Arya	Agni Prasad Kharel
Madheshi/Indigenous peoples	Sharada Devi Kumal
Madheshi	Ram Chandra Pyasi Kuswaha
Indigenous peoples	Lharkyal Lama
Indigenous peoples, Backward area	Sonam Chheju Lama
Indigenous peoples	Sakuntala Lepcha
Indigenous peoples	Rana Dhoj Limbu
Indigenous peoples	Durga Linkha
Indigenous peoples	Tham Maya Thapa Magar
Madheshi	Julie Kumari Mahato
Indigenous peoples	Sapana Pradhan Malla
Indigenous peoples	Mangal Siddhi Manandhar
Madheshi	Hasina Miya
Madheshi	Nazir Miya
Dalit	Govinda Nepali
Dalit	Rima Kumari Nepali
Khas Arya	Binda Pandey
Khas Arya	Surendra Prasad Pandey
Madheshi	Lal Babu Pandit
Khas Arya	Netra Prasad Panthi
Dalit	Durga Pariyar
Khas Arya	Bijay Kumar Paudel
Khas Arya	Sita Kumari Paudel
Madheshi	Ramprit Paswan
Khas Arya	Shankar Pokharel
Indigenous peoples	Govinda Ram Praja
Indigenous peoples	Raj Kumar Rai
Indigenous peoples	Usha Kala Rai
Madheshi/Indigenous peoples	Manasi Rajbanshi
Madheshi, Dalit	Ramrati Ram
Madheshi/Indigenous peoples	Naradmuni Rana
Khas Arya	Bhim Bahadur Rawal
Madheshi	Kiran Kumari Ray
Khas Arya	Bishnu Prasad Rimal
Madheshi	Urmila Devi Sah
Indigenous peoples	Tasi Syangbo Gurung Seni
Indigenous peoples	Lucky Sherpa
Indigenous peoples	Dhirendra Bahadur Shrestha
Dalit	Dal Bahadur Sunar
Indigenous peoples	Dolma Tamang
Indigenous peoples	Shanti Maya Tamang
Madheshi	Gopal Thakur
Khas Arya, Backward area	Devi Lal Thapa
Indigenous peoples	Roshan Gaha Thapa
Madheshi/Indigenous peoples	Chiranjibi Ram Tharu
Madheshi	Jogi Lal Yadav
Madheshi	Sarala Yadav
Nominated
Bhagwat Chaudhary
Mahesh Chaudhary
Shila Katila
Madhav Kumar Nepal
Pasang Sherpa

Madheshi Janaadhikar Forum, Nepal (Democratic)
Directly elected
Constituency	Member
Morang 4	Ram Nanda Mandal
Morang 6	Bhim Raj Chaudhary Rajbhanshi
Sunsari 3	Bijay Kumar Gachhadar
Sunsari 4	Muga Lal Mahato
Saptari 1	Hem Raj Tated
Saptari 6	Mrigendra Kumar Singh Yadav
Siraha 1	Laxman Mahato
Siraha 4	Shatrudhan Prasad Singh Koiri
Dhanusha 4	Sanjay Kumar Sah
Mahottari 5	Kaushal Kumar Ray Yadav
Mahottari 6	Sharat Singh Bhandari
Bara 3	Pramod Prasad Gupta
Parsa 1	Karima Begum
Nawalparasi 5	Ram Bachhan Ahir Yadav
Rupandehi 6	Om Prakash Yadav
Rupandehi 7	Mohammad Okil Musalman
Banke 3	Sarbadev Prasad Ojha
Party list
PR group	Member
Madheshi	Ram Chandra Ray Amat
Madheshi/Indigenous peoples	Ram Janam Chaudhary
Madheshi, Dalit	Kalawati Devi Dusadh
Madheshi/Indigenous peoples	Durga Devi Mahato
Khas Arya	Tilak Bahadur Rawal
Madheshi	Lalita Sah
Madheshi, Dalit	Asha Kumari Sardar
Madheshi, Dalit	Sebaki Devi Das Tatma
Madheshi/Indigenous peoples	Shiva Narayan Urab
Madheshi	Nilam Verma

Madheshi Janaadhikar Forum (Republican)
Directly elected
Constituency	Member
Siraha 2	Raj Lal Yadav
Siraha 6	Raj Kishor Yadav
Sarlahi 6	Shiva Poojan Ray Yadav
Rupandehi 2	Om Prakash Yadav (Gulzari)
Party list
PR group	Member
Madheshi	Madhusudan Agrawal
Madheshi	Rambha Devi
Madheshi	Sandhya Devi
Madheshi	Nanda Kumar Dutt
Madheshi	Salma Khatun Miqrani
Madheshi	Atmaram Prasad Sah
Madheshi/Indigenous peoples	Surita Kumari Sah
Madheshi	Bishwanath Prasad Yadav
Madheshi	Chandrika Prasad Yadav
Madheshi	Sabita Devi Yadav

Madheshi Janaadhikar Forum, Nepal
Directly elected
Constituency	Member
Morang 5	Jay Ram Yadav
Sunsari 5	Upendra Yadav
Saptari 4	Renu Kumari Yadav
Siraha 3	Bijay Kumar Yadav
Mahottari 2	Hari Narayan Yadav
Kapilvastu 5	Abhishek Pratap Shah
Banke 2	Mohammad Estiyak Rai
Party list
PR group	Member
Madheshi	Shrawan Kumar Agrawal
Madheshi	Ram Sahaya Prasad Yadav
Nominated
Bhupendra Chaudhary
Iqbal Ahmed Shah

Terai Madhesh Loktantrik Party
Directly elected
Constituency	Member
Mahottari 3	Ganesh Tiwari Nepali
Bara 4	Jitendra Prasad Sonar
Nawalparasi 6	Hridayesh Tripathi
Kapilvastu 3	Brijesh Kumar Gupta
Kapilvastu 4	Ishwar Dayal Mishra
Party list
PR group	Member
Madheshi	Kashi Devi Jha
Madheshi	Basanti Jha
Madheshi	Bimal Kumar Kediya
Madheshi	Kavindra Nath Thakur
Madheshi	Jay Prakash Yadav
Nominated
Mahantha Thakur

Terai Madhesh Loktantrik Party Nepal
Directly elected
Constituency	Member
Sarlahi 3	Subitri Devi Ray Yadav
Rautahat 5	Govinda Chaudhary
Kapilvastu 2	Dan Bahadur Kurmi
Party list
PR group	Member
Madheshi	Urmila Mahato Koiri
Madheshi	Salahuddin Musalman
Dalit	Ramani Ram
Madheshi	Arbind Sah
Madheshi	Chandan Sah
Madheshi	Mahendra Raya Yadav

Rastriya Prajatanta Party
Party list
PR group	Member
Madheshi	Alaudin Ansari
Khas Arya	Lokendra Bahadur Chand
Madheshi/Indigenous peoples	Navodita Chaudhary
Madheshi/Indigenous peoples	Babita Devi Dhobi
Khas Arya	Surya Bahadur K.C.
Khas Arya	Pratibha Rana
Indigenous peoples	Dal Kumari Sunuwar
Indigenous peoples	Chalan Bahadur Tamang

CPN (Marxist–Leninist)
Party list
PR group	Member
Khas Arya	Janak Kumari Chalise
Khas Arya	Nilam K.C. (Khadka)
Madheshi/Indigenous peoples	Parbati Mahato (Kumal)
Khas Arya	Chandra Prakash Mainali
Nominated
Rajendra Kumar Khetan

CPN (United)
Party list
PR group	Member
Khas Arya	Chandra Dev Joshi
Indigenous peoples	Raghav Bir Joshi
Khas Arya	Sunil Babu Pant
Khas Arya	Kalpana Rana
Madheshi	Ramshila Thakur

Nepal Majdoor Kisan Party
Directly elected
Constituency	Member
Bhaktapur 1	Narayan Man Bijukchhe
Bhaktapur 2	Sunil Prajapati
Party list
PR group	Member
Khas Arya, Backward area	Navraj Koirala
Indigenous peoples	Lila Nyaichyai
Nominated
Rajendra Kumar Khetan

Sanghiya Sadbhavana Party
Directly elected
Constituency	Member
Saptari 3	Mahesh Prasad Yadav
Sarlahi 5	Khomari Ray
Bara 1	Saroj Kumar Yadav
Party list
PR group	Member
Madheshi	Anil Kumar Jha
Indigenous peoples	Malamati Devi Rana Tharu

CPN (Marxist–Leninist–Socialist)
Party list
PR group	Member
Madheshi	Yadubamsha Jha
Indigenous peoples	Tilak Bahadur Thapa Magar
Madheshi/Indigenous peoples	Ganesh Prasad Tharu
Dalit	Sharada Nepali

Rastriya Janamorcha
Directly elected
Constituency	Member
Baglung 2	Chitra Bahadur K.C.
Party list
PR group	Member
Khas Arya	Rashmi Raj Nepali
Dalit	Santa Bahadur Nepali
Indigenous peoples	Mina Pun

Rastriya Prajatantra Party Nepal
Party list
Constituency	Member
Indigenous peoples	Chandra Bahadur Gurung
Madheshi	Ram Narayan Singh
Khas Arya	Kunti Shahi
Indigenous peoples	Babina Muktan Tamang

Rastriya Janashakti Party
Party list
PR group	Member
Indigenous peoples	Phulmati Devi Chaudhary
Khas Arya	Prakash Chandra Lohani
Indigenous peoples	Arjun Rai

CPN (Unified)
Party list
PR group	Member
Indigenous peoples	Pari Thapa
Khas Arya	Radha Devi Timilsina

Nepal Sadbhavana Party (Anandidevi)
Party list
PR group	Member
Madheshi	Sarita Giri
Nominated
Shyam Sundar Gupta

Rastriya Janamukti Party
Party list
PR group	Member
Indigenous peoples	Chhiyama Rai
Indigenous peoples	Malabar Singh Thapa

Rastriya Sadbhavana Party
Party list
PR group	Member
Madheshi	Gauri Mahato (Koiri)
Madheshi	Ram Naresh Rae

Sadbhavana Party
Directly elected
Constituency	Member
Sarlahi 4	Rajendra Mahato
Party list
PR group	Member
Madheshi	Laxman Lal Karna

Chure Bhawar Rastriya Ekta Party Nepal
Party list
PR group	Member
Khas Arya	Badri Prasad Neupane

Dalit Janajati Party
Party list
PR group	Member
Madheshi	Bishwendra Paswan

Nawa Nepal Nirman Party
Party list
PR group	Member
Madheshi	Moti Lal Dugad

Nepa Rastriya Party
Party list
PR group	Member
Indigenous peoples	Buddha Ratna Manandhar

Nepal Loktantrik Samajbadi Dal
Party list
PR group	Member
Indigenous peoples	Laxmi Lal Chaudhary

Nepal Parivar Dal
Party list
PR group	Member
Khas Arya	Ek Nath Dhakal

Nepali Janata Dal
Party list
PR group	Member
Madheshi	Gayatri Sah

Nepali Janata Dal (United)
Party list
PR group	Member
Madheshi	Bishwanath Prasad Agrawal

Samajbadi Janata Party
Party list
PR group	Member
Khas Arya	Prem Bahadur Singh

Sanghiya Loktantrik Rastriya Manch (Tharuhat)
Party list
PR group	Member
Indigenous peoples	Rukmini Chaudhary

Independents
Directly elected
Constituency	Member
Saptari 5	Sadrul Miya Haque
Rautahat 1	Baban Singh

== Party changes or defections ==
Constituency/PR group	Member	From	To	Date
Mahottari 1	Giriraj Mani Pokharel	Janamorcha	UCPN (Maoist)	13 January 2009
Chitwan 5	Amik Sherchan	Janamorcha	UCPN (Maoist)	13 January 2009
Dalit	Bishwa Bhakta Dulal	Janamorcha	UCPN (Maoist)	13 January 2009
Khas Arya	Bhim Prasad Gautam	Janamorcha	UCPN (Maoist)	13 January 2009
Khas Arya	Sita Pokharel	Janamorcha	UCPN (Maoist)	13 January 2009
Indigenous peoples	Durga Jayanti Rai	Janamorcha	UCPN (Maoist)	13 January 2009
Madheshi	Ram Kumar Yadav	Janamorcha	UCPN (Maoist)	13 January 2009
Nominated	Narayan Kaji Shrestha	Janamorcha	UCPN (Maoist)	13 January 2009
Sarlahi 3	Subitri Devi Ray Yadav	TMLP	TMLP Nepal	31 December 2010
Rautahat 5	Govinda Chaudhary	TMLP	TMLP Nepal	31 December 2010
Kapilvastu 2	Dan Bahadur Kurmi	TMLP	TMLP Nepal	31 December 2010
Madheshi	Urmila Mahato Koiri	TMLP	TMLP Nepal	31 December 2010
Madheshi	Salahuddin Musalman	TMLP	TMLP Nepal	31 December 2010
Dalit	Ramani Ray	TMLP	TMLP Nepal	31 December 2010
Madheshi	Arbind Sah	TMLP	TMLP Nepal	31 December 2010
Madheshi	Chandan Sah	TMLP	TMLP Nepal	31 December 2010
Madheshi	Mahendra Raya Yadav	TMLP	TMLP Nepal	31 December 2010
Morang 4	Ram Nanda Mandal	MJF-N	MJFN (Loktantrik)	
Morang 6	Bhim Raj Chaudhary Rajbhanshi	MJF-N	MJFN (Loktantrik)	
Sunsari 3	Bijay Kumar Gachhadar	MJF-N	MJFN (Loktantrik)	
Sunsari 4	Muga Lal Mahato	MJF-N	MJFN (Loktantrik)	
Saptari 1	Hem Raj Tated	MJF-N	MJFN (Loktantrik)	
Saptari 6	Mrigendra Kumar Singh Yadav	MJF-N	MJFN (Loktantrik)	
Siraha 1	Laxman Mahato	MJF-N	MJFN (Loktantrik)	
Siraha 4	Shatrudhan Prasad Singh Koiri	MJF-N	MJFN (Loktantrik)	
Dhanusha 4	Sanjay Kumar Sah	MJF-N	MJFN (Loktantrik)	
Mahottari 5	Kaushal Kumar Ray Yadav	MJF-N	MJFN (Loktantrik)	
Mahottari 6	Sharat Singh Bhandari	MJF-N	MJFN (Loktantrik)	
Bara 3	Pramod Prasad Gupta	MJF-N	MJFN (Loktantrik)	
Parsa 1	Karima Begum	MJF-N	MJFN (Loktantrik)	
Nawalparasi 5	Ram Bachhan Ahir Yadav	MJF-N	MJFN (Loktantrik)	
Rupandehi 6	Om Prakash Yadav	MJF-N	MJFN (Loktantrik)	
Rupandehi 7	Mohammad Wakil Musalman	MJF-N	MJFN (Loktantrik)	
Banke 3	Sarbadev Prasad Ojha	MJF-N	MJFN (Loktantrik)	
Madheshi	Ram Chandra Ray Amat	MJF-N	MJFN (Loktantrik)	
Madheshi/Indigenous peoples	Ram Janam Chaudhary	MJF-N	MJFN (Loktantrik)	
Madheshi, Dalit	Kalawati Devi Dusadh	MJF-N	MJFN (Loktantrik)	
Madheshi/Indigenous peoples	Durga Devi Mahato	MJF-N	MJFN (Loktantrik)	
Khas Arya	Tilak Bahadur Rawal	MJF-N	MJFN (Loktantrik)	
Madheshi	Lalita Sah	MJF-N	MJFN (Loktantrik)	
Madheshi, Dalit	Asha Kumari Sardar	MJF-N	MJFN (Loktantrik)	
Madheshi, Dalit	Sebaki Devi Das Tatma	MJF-N	MJFN (Loktantrik)	
Madheshi/Indigenous peoples	Shiva Narayan Urab	MJF-N	MJFN (Loktantrik)	
Madheshi	Nilam Verma	MJF-N	MJFN (Loktantrik)	
Saptari 2	Jay Prakash Gupta	MJF-N	MJF (Republican)	
Siraha 2	Raj Lal Yadav	MJF-N	MJF (Republican)	
Siraha 6	Raj Kishor Yadav	MJF-N	MJF (Republican)	
Sarlahi 6	Shiva Poojan Ray Yadav	MJF-N	MJF (Republican)	
Rupandehi 2	Om Prakash Yadav (Gulzari)	MJF-N	MJF (Republican)	
Madheshi	Madhusudan Agrawal	MJF-N	MJF (Republican)	
Madheshi	Rambha Devi	MJF-N	MJF (Republican)	
Madheshi	Sandhya Devi	MJF-N	MJF (Republican)	
Madheshi	Nanda Kumar Dutt	MJF-N	MJF (Republican)	
Madheshi	Salma Khatun Miqrani	MJF-N	MJF (Republican)	
Madheshi	Atmaram Prasad Sah	MJF-N	MJF (Republican)	
Madheshi/Indigenous peoples	Surita Kumari Sah	MJF-N	MJF (Republican)	
Madheshi	Bishwanath Prasad Yadav	MJF-N	MJF (Republican)	
Madheshi	Chandrika Prasad Yadav	MJF-N	MJF (Republican)	
Madheshi	Sabita Devi Yadav	MJF-N	MJF (Republican)	
Saptari 3	Mahesh Prasad Yadav	Sadbhavana	Sanghiya Sadbhavana	
Sarlahi 5	Khomari Ray	Sadbhavana	Sanghiya Sadbhavana	
Bara 1	Saroj Kumar Yadav	Sadbhavana	Sanghiya Sadbhavana	
Madheshi	Anil Kumar Jha	Sadbhavana	Sanghiya Sadbhavana	
Indigenous peoples	Malamati Devi Rana Tharu	Sadbhavana	Sanghiya Sadbhavana	
Madheshi	Gauri Mahato (Koiri)	Sadbhavana	Rastriya Sadbhawana	
Madheshi	Ram Naresh Rae	Sadbhavana	Rastriya Sadbhawana	
Indigenous peoples	Rukmini Chaudhary	SLRM	SLRM (Tharuhat)	
Madheshi	Bishwanath Prasad Agrawal	Nepali Janata Dal	NJD (United)	
Madheshi	Moti Lal Dugar	Sadbhavana (Anandidevi)	Nawa Nepal Nirman Party	
Madheshi	Yadubamsha Jha	CPN (ML)	CPN (Marxist–Leninist–Socialist)	
Indigenous peoples	Tilak Bahadur Thapa Magar	CPN (ML)	CPN (Marxist–Leninist–Socialist)	
Madheshi/Indigenous peoples	Ganesh Prasad Tharu	CPN (ML)	CPN (Marxist–Leninist–Socialist)	
Dalit	Sharada Nepali	CPN (ML)	CPN (Marxist–Leninist–Socialist)	

== By-elections or replacements ==
Constituency/PR group	Incumbent		Cause of vacation	Replacement		By-election
Constituency/PR group	Name	Party	Cause of vacation	Name	Party	By-election
Khas Arya	Mohan Baidya	CPN (Maoist)	Resigned	Kuber Bahadur Oli	CPN (Maoist)	
Madheshi/Indigenous peoples	Bodh Narayan Sardar	Nepali Congress	Death	Birendra Majhi	Nepali Congress	
Nominated	Sushil Chandra Amatya	CPN (UML)	Resigned	Madhav Kumar Nepal	CPN (UML)	
Morang 5	Upendra Yadav	MJF-N	Elected from Sunsari 5	Jay Ram Yadav	MJF-N	2009
Morang 7	Bijay Kumar Gachhadar	MJF-N	Elected from Sunsari 3	Shekhar Koirala	Congress	2009
Dhanusha 5	Ram Baran Yadav	Congress	Elected to President	Raghubir Mahaseth	CPN (UML)	2009
Kaski 1	Dev Prasad Gurung	CPN (Maoist)	Elected from Manang 1	Krishna Bahadur Gurung	UCPN (Maoist)	2009
Rolpa 2	Pushpa Kamal Dahal	CPN (Maoist)	Elected from Kathmandu 10	Santosh Kumar Budha Magar	UCPN (Maoist)	2009
Kanchanpur 4	Sher Bahadur Deuba	Congress	Elected from Dadeldhura 1	Harish Thakulla	UCPN (Maoist)	2009
Madheshi	Matrika Prasad Yadav	UCPN (Maoist)	Resigned from party	Ram Kumar Paswan	UCPN (Maoist)	
Madheshi	Jagat Prasad Yadav	UCPN (Maoist)	Resigned from party	Farmud Nadaf	UCPN (Maoist)	
Khas Arya	Girija Prasad Koirala	Congress	Death	Man Mohan Bhattarai	Congress	
Madheshi/Indigenous peoples	Damodar Chaudhary	CPN (ML)	Death	Ganesh Prasad Tharu	CPN (ML)	
Dhanusha 6	Ram Kumari Devi Yadav	CPN (ML)	Death			
Mahottari 4	Ram Kumar Sharma	TMLP	Resigned			
Sankhuwasabha 2	Dambar Bahadur Khadka	CPN (UML)	Death			
Khas Arya	Keshav Prasad Mainali	Churebhawar Rastriya Ekta Party	Resigned from party	Badri Prasad Neupane	Churebhawar Rastriya Ekta Party	
Indigenous peoples	Raj Kumar Limbu (Nambo)	SLRM	Resigned from party			
Saptari 2	Jay Prakash Gupta	MJF (Republican)	Dismissed for corruption			
Nominated	Radhe Shyam Adhikari	Congress	Resigned			
