= List of Nepalese politicians =

This article contains a list of Wikipedia articles about Nepalese politicians by alphabetic order of family name.

== A ==
- Mohammed Aftab Aalam
- Bhim Acharya
- Dilaram Acharya
- Drona Prasad Acharya
- Lekh Nath Acharya
- Mahesh Acharya
- Mahadev Bajgai
- Narahari Acharya
- Shailaja Acharya (born 1944)
- Haribhakta Adhikari
- Khagaraj Adhikari
- Mohan Chandra Adhikari
- Narayan Prasad Adhikari
- Rabindra Prasad Adhikari
- Ram Nath Adhikari
- Shekha Nath Adhikari
- Ghan Shyam Yadav Ahir
- Ram Bachhan Ahir
- Madan Bahadur Amatya
- Salim Miya Ansari
- Urmila Aryal

Back to top

== B ==
- Durga Kumari B.K.
- Kanchan Chandra Bade
- Dilendra Prasad Badu
- Bhagat Bahadur Baduwal
- Bebas Dhungana
- Raghav Lal Baidya
- Khadgajeet Baral (born 1928)
- Sudarshan Baral
- Dipak Prakash Baskota
- Hari Bahadur Basnet
- Hari Nath Bastola
- Mohan Bahadur Basnet
- Shakti Bahadur Basnet
- Tek Bahadur Basnet
- Damodar Bastakoti
- Gunakhar Basyal
- Mirza Dilshad Beg
- Buddhiram Bhandari
- Damodar Bhandari
- Lila Kumari Bhandari
- Naresh Bhandari
- Sarad Singh Bhandari
- Sharad Singh Bhandari
- Dev Raj Bhar
- Tekendra Prasad Bhatt
- Lekh Raj Bhatta
- Baburam Bhattarai (born 1954)
- Pampha Bhusal (born 1963)
- Narayan Man Bijukchhe (born 1939)
- Khadga Bahadur Bishwakarma (born 1968)
- Gokarna Bista
- Nara Bahadur Bista
- Ram Bahadur Bista
- Post Bahadur Bogati (1953–2014)
- Sabitri Bogati
- Ram Bahadur Bohara
- Sita Devi Boudel
- Raj Bahadur Budha
- Karn Jit Budhathoki
- Keshav Kumar Budhathoki
- Khem Bahadur Bum
- Narendra Bahadur Bum

Back to top

== C ==
- Janak Kumari Chalise
- Binayadhoj Chand
- Nar Bahadur Chand
- Renu Chand
- Gyan Kumari Chantyal
- Dharma Sila Chapagain
- Bir Man Chaudhari
- Dan Bahadur Chaudhari
- Devi Lal Chaudhari
- Krishna Kumar Chaudhari
- Phulmati Devi Chaudhari
- Ramcharan Chaudhari
- Rupa So.Si. Chaudhari
- Smriti Narayan Chaudhari
- Uma Kanta Chaudhari
- Balbir Prasad Chaudhary
- Damodar Chaudhary (died 2010)
- Laxmilal Chaudhary
- Mithila Chaudhary
- Parbati Chaudhary
- Rukmini Chaudhary
- Shanta Chaudhary
- Sushila Chaudhary
- Kamal Prasad Chaulagain
- Tek Bahadur Chokhyal

Back to top

- Chatur Bahadur Chand

== D ==
- Tirtha Ram Dangol
- Ranju Darshana (born 1996)
- Arzu Rana Deuba (born 1962)
- Sher Bahadur Deuba (born 1946)
- Ek Nath Dhakal (born 1974)
- Janardan Dhakal
- Ramnath Dhakal (1962–2015)
- Nav Raj Dhami
- Ram Hari Dhungel
- Rameshwor Prasad Dhungel
- Pushpa Kamal Dahal

== G ==
- Mahendra Dhoj G.C.
- Bijay Kumar Gachhadar
- Bam Dev Gautam (born 1944)
- Rishikesh Gautam (born 1941)
- Sanjay Gautam
- Shiv Raj Gautam
- Jaypuri Gharti
- Dharma Prasad Ghimire
- Krishna Kishor Ghimire
- Sushma Sharma Ghimire
- Deepak Giri
- Gehendra Giri
- Janak Raj Giri
- Om Prakash Yadav Gulzari
- Bhagwan Das Gupta (1940–1998)
- Brijesh Kumar Gupta
- Chandra Bahadur Gurung
- Dev Gurung
- Hit Kaji Gurung
- Kiran Gurung
- Kul Bahadur Gurung
- Mahadev Gurung
- Palten Gurung
- Prakash Bahadur Gurung
- Surya Man Gurung
- Tek Bahadur Gurung
- Pradip Kumar Gyawali
- Radha Gyawali
- Ram Kumar Gyawali

Back to top

== H ==
- Sadrul Miya Haque

Back to top

== J ==
- Anil Kumar Jha
- Arjun Prasad Joshi
- Bedanand Jha
- Ganga Datta Joshi
- Bhanu Bhakta Joshi
- Chandeshwor Jha
- Dev Raj Joshi
- Govinda Raj Joshi (born 1949)
- Hari Lal Joshi
- Laxman Dutta Joshi
- Nabindra Raj Joshi (born 1964)
- Padma Jyoti
- Shiv Raj Joshi

Back to top

== K ==
- Arjun Narasingha K.C. (born 1947)
- Chitra Bahadur K.C.
- Dipak Bahadur K.C.
- Gyanu K.C.
- Nilam K.C.
- Tanka Prasad Sharma Kadel
- Yam Lal Kandel
- Birendra Kumar Kanudiya
- Dipak Karki (Jhapa politician)
- Dipak Karki (Dhanusha politician)
- Ram Karki (born 1956)
- Sushila Karki (born 1952)
- Kailash Nath Kasudhan
- Rajendra Kumar KC
- Gauri Shankar Khadka
- Hari Bahadur Khadka
- Bishal Khadka
- Narayan Khadka
- Shankar Bahadur Khadka
- Jhala Nath Khanal (born 1950)
- Raju Khanal
- Prakash Koirala
- Shashanka Koirala
- Shekhar Koirala
- Sujata Koirala
- Sushil Koirala (1939–2016)
- Narendra Bahadur Kunwor
- Sher Bahadur Kunwor
- Chinak Kurmi
- Dan Bahadur Kurmi

Back to top

== L ==
- Dil Bahadur Lama (1930–2014)
- Mani Lama
- Tirtha Bahadur Lama
- Ramesh Lekhak
- Bishwodip Lingden Limbu
- Hari Raj Limbu
- Purna Kumar Sharma Limbu
- Til Kumar Menyangbo Limbu
- Prakash Chandra Lohani

Back to top

== M ==
- Balaram Gharti Magar
- Onsari Gharti Magar
- Suresh Ale Magar
- Krishna Bahadur Mahara
- Chandra Maharjan
- Ram Saran Mahat
- Muga Lal Mahato
- Rajendra Mahato (born 1958)
- Chandra Prakash Mainali (born 1951)
- Keshav Prasad Mainali
- Radha Krishna Mainali (born 1946)
- Kali Bahadur Malla
- Sapana Pradhan Malla
- Suresh Malla
- Ram Bir Manandhar
- Farmulha Mansur
- Farmulla Mansur
- Chandra Lal Meche
- Salma Khatoon Mikrani
- Ishwar Dayal Mishra
- Hasina Miya
- Manjit Tamrakar
- Muhammad Okil Musalman

Back to top

== N ==
- Nabaraj Thapa

Nabaraj Thapa is a committed Nepali political figure and a Central Committee Member of the Rastriya Swatantra Party (RSP). He represents a new generation of leaders who advocate for transparency, accountability, and reform in Nepal’s political system.

Before joining the Rastriya Swatantra Party, Thapa was actively involved in the Bibeksheel Sajha Party, where he worked closely with reform-oriented leaders including the late Ujjwal Thapa. During his time in Bibeksheel Sajha, he was part of a movement that promoted ethical leadership, youth participation, and clean politics in Nepal. After years of involvement in reform politics, Nabaraj Thapa, along with colleagues inspired by Ujjwal Thapa’s vision, played a role in bringing those reformist ideals into a broader national platform by merging their political efforts with the Rastriya Swatantra Party.

As a Central Committee Member of RSP, Thapa contributes to shaping party policies, strengthening grassroots networks, and promoting good governance. He strongly advocates for corruption-free administration, economic opportunities for youth, and institutional reforms that can rebuild public trust in politics.

Through his continued political engagement, Nabaraj Thapa remains committed to carrying forward the ideals of integrity, civic responsibility, and democratic reform, working toward a more transparent and accountable future for Nepal.

- Mahendra Narayan Nidhi
- Bimalendra Nidhi
- Farmud Nadaf
- Basanta Kumar Nemwang
- Kul Prasad Nepal
- Madhav Kumar Nepal (born 1953)
- Kedar Neupane
- Lekh Nath Neupane
- Mukunda Neupane

Back to top

== O ==
- Om Prasad Ojha
- Puskar Nath Ojha
- Sarbadev Ojha
- Khadga Prasad Oli (born 1952)

Back to top

== P ==
- Pradip Paudel
- Bal Chandra Poudel (born 1961)
- Binda Pandey (born 1966)
- Mahendra Bahadur Pandey
- Mohan Prasad Pandey
- Shanker Prasad Pandey
- Som Prasad Pandey
- Surendra Pandey
- Raghuji Pant
- Sunil Babu Pant
- Urbadutta Pant
- Hari Parajuli
- Tilak Pariyar
- Vishwendraman Pashwan
- Ananta Prasad Paudel (born 1962)
- Bishnu Prasad Paudel
- Govinda Paudel
- Kashi Paudel
- Narayan Sharma Paudel
- Rameshwor Phuyal
- Aananda Pokharel
- Giriraj Mani Pokharel
- Pushpa Raj Pokharel
- Bidhyanath Pokhrel
- Laxmi Prasad Pokhrel
- Ram Chandra Pokhrel
- Shankar Pokhrel (born 1964)
- Prakash Sharma Poudel
- Purusottam Poudel
- Ram Chandra Poudel
- Bhimsen Das Pradhan
- Sahana Pradhan (1927–2014)
- Surya Prasad Pradhan
- Sunil Prajapati
- Barsaman Pun
- Narayan Singh Pun (died 2008)

Back to top

== R ==
- Arjun Rai
- Mohammad Estiyak Rai
- Sher Dhan Rai
- Purna Prasad Rajbansi
- Madhukar Shamshere Rana
- Dhyan Govinda Ranjit
- Lal Bahadur Rawal
- Nagendra Kumar Ray
- Top Bahadur Rayamajhi
- Sarala Regmi
- Ganesh Prasad Rijal
- Minendra Rijal
- Hari Roka
- Jun Kumari Roka
- Keshar Man Rokka
- Mahendra Kumar Raya

Back to top

== S ==
- Dila Sangraula
- Ambika Sanwa
- Agni Sapkota (born 1958)
- Bidur Prasad Sapkota
- Golchhe Sarki
- Narayan Prakash Saud
- Abhishek Pratap Shah (born 1982)
- Ajaya Pratap Shah
- Bhakta Bahadur Shah
- Bharat Kumar Shah
- Binod Kumar Shah
- Gobinda Bahadur Shah
- Jagya Bahadur Shahi
- Astalaxmi Shakya
- Dama Kumari Sharma
- Dilli Raj Sharma
- Janardhan Sharma
- Uma Kant Sharma
- Kripasur Sherpa
- Gopal Man Shrestha
- Jog Meher Shrestha
- Narayan Kaji Shrestha
- Shashi Shrestha
- Arjun Jang Bahadur Singh
- Baban Singh
- Ganesh Man Singh
- Harka Bahadur Singh
- Kunwar Inderjit Singh (1906–1982)
- Prakash Man Singh
- Prem Bahadur Singh
- Prem Lal Singh
- Lila Kumari Bagale Somai
- Sukra Raj Sonyok (born 1936)
- Jhakku Prasad Subedi
- Purna Kumari Subedi
- Ram Hari Subedi
- Sita Subedi
- Dal Bahadur Sunar
- Sushila Swar
- Bijay Subedi

== T ==
- Sher Bahadur Tamang
- Surya Man Dong Tamang
- Ram Krishna Tamrakar
- Sebaki Devi Das Tatma
- Romy Gauchan Thakali
- Rhidya Ram Thani
- Amar Bahadur Thapa
- Chandra Bahadur Thapa
- Gagan Thapa
- Karna Bahadur Thapa
- Ram Bahadur Thapa
- Surya Bahadur Thapa (1928–2015)
- Bishnu Prasad Chaudhari Tharu
- Indrajit Tharu
- Mangal Prasad Tharu
- Puran Rana Tharu
- Sant Kumar Tharu
- Santa Kumar Tharu
- Ram Chandra Tiwari
- Hridayesh Tripathi
- Damber Dhoj Tumbahamphe

Back to top

== U ==
- Dip Kumar Upadhaya
- Amod Prasad Upadhyay (born 1936)
- Kul Prasad Uprety

Back to top

== Y ==
- Chitra Lekha Yadav
- Dinesh Chandra Yadav
- Omprakash Yadav
- Radhe Chandra Yadav
- Ram Ayodhya Prasad Yadav
- Ram Baran Yadav (born 1948)
- Renu Kumari Yadav
- Upendra Yadav (born 1960)
- Hisila Yami (born 1959)

Back to top
