= Baburam Bhattarai cabinet =

Government of Nepal from 2011 to 2013

Bhattarai cabinet
- Cabinet of Nepal
- August 2011–March 2013
- Date formed: 29 August 2011
- Date dissolved: 14 March 2013

People and organisations
- President: Ram Baran Yadav
- Prime Minister: Baburam Bhattarai
- Deputy Prime Minister: Bijay Kumar Gachhadar
- Total no. of members: 63 appointments
- Member party: UCPN (Maoist); MFJN (Loktantrik); MJF (Republican); TMLP; TMLP Nepal; Sanghiya Sadbhavana; CPN (MLS); Janamukti; Sadbhavana; Nepa Rastriya Party; Chure Bhawar; Nepal Pariwar Dal
- Status in legislature: Majority (coalition)
- Opposition party: Nepali Congress
- Opposition leader: Sushil Koirala

History
- Election: 2008
- Legislature terms: 2008–2012
- Predecessor: Khanal cabinet
- Successor: Regmi interim cabinet

The Baburam Bhattarai cabinet was formed on 29 August 2011 after Baburam Bhattarai of UCPN (Maoist) was appointed as prime minister. The cabinet was expanded on 4 September, 15 September and 8 November 2011. The coalition government was formed with the United Democratic Madhesi Front and minor parties in the Constituent Assembly.

The ministers in the coalition resigned on 4 May 2012 to make way for a national unity government. The cabinet was reformed on 5 May 2012 including the Nepali Congress and CPN (UML). The cabinet was expanded on 16 and 18 May. Nepali Congress and CPN (UML) withdrew from the cabinet on 29 May 2012.

As a way out of the political deadlock since the dissolution of the first Nepalese Constituent Assembly in 2012, he was replaced by Chief Justice Khil Raj Regmi on 14 March 2013 as the head of an interim government that was to hold elections by 21 June 2013.

== Election of the Prime Minister ==
28 August 2011 10th Session Constituent Assembly Absolute majority (301/601) required
Constituent Assembly
Candidate's Name	Party	Votes
Baburam Bhattarai	CPN (Maoist)	340 / 601
Ram Chandra Poudel	Nepali Congress	235 / 601

== Cabinet ==
=== August 2011–May 2012 ===
Portfolio	Minister	Party	Assumed office	Left office
Prime Minister of Nepal	Baburam Bhattarai	UCPN (Maoist)	29 August 2011	14 March 2013
Deputy Prime Minister of Nepal; Minister for Home Affairs	Bijay Kumar Gachhadar	MFJN (Loktantrik)	29 August 2011	4 May 2012
Minister for Defence	Bijay Kumar Gachhadar	MFJN (Loktantrik)	19 October 2011	4 May 2012
Deputy Prime Minister of Nepal; Minister for Foreign Affairs	Narayan Kaji Shrestha	UCPN (Maoist)	4 September 2011	4 May 2012
Minister for Information and Communication Technology	Jaya Prakash Prasad Gupta	MJF (Republican)	4 September 2017	21 February 2012
Minister for Physical Planning and Works	Hridayesh Tripathi	TMLP	4 September 2011	4 May 2012
Minister for Law and Justice	Hridayesh Tripathi	TMLP	4 September 2011	15 September 2011
Minister for Energy	Post Bahadur Bogati	UCPN (Maoist)	4 September 2011	4 May 2012
Minister for Education	Post Bahadur Bogati	UCPN (Maoist)	19 October 2011	8 November 2011
Minister for Local Development	Top Bahadur Rayamajhi	UCPN (Maoist)	4 September 2011	4 May 2012
Minister for Education	Top Bahadur Rayamajhi	UCPN (Maoist)	15 September 2011	19 October 2011
Minister for Land Reform and Management	Top Bahadur Rayamajhi	UCPN (Maoist)	19 October 2011	8 November 2011
Minister for Defence	Sharat Singh Bhandari	MFJN (Loktantrik)	15 September 2011	19 October 2011
Minister for Health and Population	Rajendra Mahato	Sadbhavana	4 September 2011	4 May 2012
Minister for Finance	Barsaman Pun	UCPN (Maoist)	4 September 2011	4 May 2012
Minister for Peace and Reconstruction	Barsaman Pun	UCPN (Maoist)	15 September 2011	8 November 2011
Minister for Education	Dina Nath Sharma	UCPN (Maoist)	8 November 2011	4 May 2012
Minister for Irrigation	Mahendra Raya Yadav	TMLP Nepal	4 September 2011	4 May 2012
Minister for Women, Children and Social Welfare	Mahendra Raya Yadav	TMLP Nepal	4 September 2011	18 September 2011
Minister for Tourism and Civil Aviation	Lokendra Bista Magar	UCPN (Maoist)	8 November 2011	4 May 2012
Minister for Constituent Assembly, Federal Affairs, Parliamentary System and Culture	Gopal Kirati	UCPN (Maoist)	15 September 2011	4 May 2012
Minister for Commerce and Supply	Lekh Raj Bhatta	UCPN (Maoist)	15 September 2011	4 May 2012
Minister for Land Reform and Management	Prabhu Sah	UCPN (Maoist)	4 September 2011	19 October 2011
Minister for Land Reform and Management	Bhim Prasad Gautam	UCPN (Maoist)	8 November 2011	4 May 2012
Minister for General Administration	Ram Kumar Yadav	UCPN (Maoist)	8 November 2011	4 May 2012
Minister for Industry	Anil Kumar Jha	Sanghiya Sadbhavana	15 September 2011	4 May 2012
Minister for Law and Justice	Brijesh Kumar Gupta	TMLP	15 September 2011	4 May 2012
Minister for Environment	Hemraj Tated	MFJN (Loktantrik)	15 September 2011	4 May 2012
Minister for Agriculture and Cooperatives	Nandan Kumar Dutt	MJF (Republican)	4 September 2011	26 March 2012
Minister for Youth and Sports	Kamala Roka	UCPN (Maoist)	4 September 2011	4 May 2012
Minister without portfolio	Raj Lal Yadav	MFJN (Loktantrik)	4 September 2011	4 May 2012
Minister for Forest and Soil Conservation	Mohamad Wokil Musalman	MFJN (Loktantrik)	4 September 2011	4 May 2012
Minister for Women, Children and Social Welfare	Dan Bahadur Kurmi	TMLP Nepal	18 September 2011	4 May 2012
Minister for Labour and Transport Management	Sarita Giri	Sadbhawana (Anandidevi)	8 November 2011	23 March 2012
Minister for Labour and Transport Management	Malabar Singh Thapa	Janamukti	23 March 2012	4 May 2012
Minister for Science and Technology	Kalpana Dhamala	UCPN (Maoist)	8 November 2011	4 May 2012
Minister for Peace and Reconstruction	Satya Pahadi	UCPN (Maoist)	8 November 2011	4 May 2012
Ministers of State
Minister of State for Defence	Ram Bachhan Ahir	MFJN (Loktantrik)	8 November 2011	4 May 2012
Minister of State for Health and Population	Saroj Kumar Yadav	Sanghiya Sadbhavana	8 November 2011	4 May 2012
Minister of State for Tourism and Civil Aviation	Dilip Maharjan	UCPN (Maoist)	8 November 2011	23 March 2012
Minister of State for Land Reform and Management	Dilip Maharjan	UCPN (Maoist)	23 March 2012	4 May 2012
Minister of State for Commerce and Supply	Bishnu Prasad Chaudhari	UCPN (Maoist)	8 November 2011	4 May 2012
Minister of State for Energy	Surya Man Dong	UCPN (Maoist)	8 November 2011	4 May 2012
Minister of State for Education	Lila Kumari Bhandari	UCPN (Maoist)	8 November 2011	4 May 2012
Minister of State for Youth and Sports	Gopi Achhami	UCPN (Maoist)	8 November 2011	4 May 2012
Minister of State for Local Development	Ghan Shyam Yadav	UCPN (Maoist)	8 November 2011	4 May 2012
Minister of State for Land Reform and Management	Jwala Kumari Sah	UCPN (Maoist)	8 November 2011	23 March 2012
Minister of State for Tourism and Civil Aviation	Jwala Kumari Sah	UCPN (Maoist)	23 March 2012	4 May 2012
Minister of State for Constituent Assembly, Federal Affairs, Parliamentary System and Culture	Sushma Sharma	UCPN (Maoist)	8 November 2011	4 May 2012
Minister of State for Finance	Hari Raj Limbu	UCPN (Maoist)	8 November 2011	4 May 2012
Minister of State for General Administration	Sunita Kumari Mahato	UCPN (Maoist)	8 November 2011	4 May 2012
Minister of State for Home Affairs	Bhim Raj Chaudhary Rajbanshi	MFJN (Loktantrik)	8 November 2011	4 May 2012
Minister of State for Forest and Soil Conservation	Laxman Mahato	MFJN (Loktantrik)	8 November 2011	4 May 2012
Minister of State for Environment	Durga Devi Mahato	MFJN (Loktantrik)	8 November 2011	4 May 2012
Minister of State for Law and Justice	Kashi Devi Jha	TMLP	8 November 2011	4 May 2012
Minister of State for Land Reform and Management	Ishwar Dayal Mishra	TMLP	8 November 2011	4 May 2012
Minister of State for Women, Children and Social Welfare	Arbind Sah	TMLP Nepal	8 November 2011	4 May 2012
Minister of State for Irrigation	Ramani Ram	TMLP Nepal	8 November 2011	4 May 2012
Minister of State for Industry	Khobhari Raya	Sanghiya Sadbhavana	13 November 2011	4 May 2012
Minister of State for Information and Communication Technology	Surita Kumari Sah	MFJN (Loktantrik)	13 November 2011	4 May 2012
Minister of State for Agriculture and Cooperatives	Om Prakash Yadav	MFJN (Loktantrik)	13 November 2011	4 May 2012

=== May 2012–March 2013 ===
Portfolio	Minister	Party	Assumed office	Left office
Prime Minister of Nepal	Baburam Bhattarai	UCPN (Maoist)	29 August 2011	14 March 2013
Deputy Prime Minister of Nepal; Minister for Home Affairs	Bijay Kumar Gachhadar	MFJN (Loktantrik)	5 May 2012	14 March 2013
Deputy Prime Minister of Nepal	Narayan Kaji Shrestha	UCPN (Maoist)	5 May 2012	14 March 2013
Minister for Foreign Affairs	Narayan Kaji Shrestha	UCPN (Maoist)	1 June 2012	14 March 2013
Minister for Energy	Narayan Kaji Shrestha	UCPN (Maoist)	1 June 2012	16 July 2012
Minister for Federal Affairs, Local Development and General Administration	Narayan Kaji Shrestha	UCPN (Maoist)	16 July 2012	14 March 2013
Deputy Prime Minister of Nepal	Krishna Prasad Sitaula (Note: Appointed without portfolio on 5 May 2012)	Congress	6 May 2012	29 May 2012
Minister for Defence; Minister for Law, Justice, Constituent Assembly and Parliamentary Affairs	Krishna Prasad Sitaula	Congress	18 May 2012	29 May 2012
Deputy Prime Minister of Nepal; Minister for Foreign Affairs; Minister for Agriculture Development; Minister for Youth and Sports	Ishwar Pokhrel	CPN (UML)	16 May 2012	29 May 2012
Minister for Physical Planning, Works and Transportation Management	Hridayesh Tripathi	TMLP	5 May 2012	14 March 2013
Minister for Culture, Tourism and Civil Aviation	Post Bahadur Bogati	UCPN (Maoist)	18 May 2012	14 March 2013
Minister for Labour and Employment	Post Bahadur Bogati	UCPN (Maoist)	20 October 2012	14 March 2013
Minister for Peace and Reconstruction	Top Bahadur Rayamajhi	UCPN (Maoist)	18 May 2012	14 March 2013
Minister for Land Reform and Management	Top Bahadur Rayamajhi	UCPN (Maoist)	18 September 2012	14 March 2013
Minister for Health and Population	Rajendra Mahato	Sadbhavana	5 May 2012	14 March 2013
Minister for Finance	Barsaman Pun	UCPN (Maoist)	5 May 2012	14 March 2013
Minister for Education	Dina Nath Sharma	UCPN (Maoist)	5 May 2012	14 March 2013
Minister for Irrigation	Mahendra Raya Yadav	TMLP Nepal	5 May 2012	14 March 2013
Minister for Industry	Anil Kumar Jha (Note: Appointment without portfolio on 16 May 2022)	Sanghiya Sadbhavana	18 May 2012	14 March 2013
Minister for Information and Communication Technology	Raj Kishor Yadav	MJF (Republican)	5 May 2012	14 March 2013
Minister for Federal Affairs, Local Development and General Administration	Surya Man Gurung	Congress	5 May 2012	29 May 2012
Minister for Commerce and Supplies	Parshuram Khapung	RPP	18 May 2012	29 May 2012
Minister for Energy	Radha Gyawali	CPN (UML)	18 May 2012	29 May 2012
Minister for Land Reform and Management	Chandra Dev Joshi	CPN (United)	18 May 2012	18 September 2012
Minister for Environment; Minister for Science and Technology	Keshav Man Shakya	Nepa Rastriya	18 May 2012	14 March 2013
Minister for Cooperatives and Poverty Alleviation	Eknath Dhakal	Nepal Pariwar Dal	18 May 2012	14 March 2013
Minister for Labour and Employment	Kumar Belbase	CPN (ML)	20 May 2012	20 October 2012
Minister for Forests and Soil Conservation	Yadubamsha Jha	CPN (MLS)	20 May 2012	14 March 2013
Minister for Women, Children and Social Welfare	Badri Prasad Neupane	CBREPN	20 May 2012	14 March 2013
