= Subedi =

Subedi सुवेदी
- Language: Nepali, Doteli, Kumaoni

Origin
- Language: Khas
- Origin: Nepal

Other names
- Variant form: Suvedi/Suberi
- Derivatives: Sharma Subedi, Singh Subedi

Subedi (Nepali: सुवेदी [subedi]) is one of the surnames of Brahmin Varna in Nepal.

== Notable people with surname Subedi ==
- Abhi Subedi, Nepalese playwright and poet
- Balkrishna, (born Balkrishna Subedi) Indian billionaire and CEO of Patanjali Ayurved
- Durga Subedi, Nepalese cricket umpire
- Jhakku Prasad Subedi, Nepalese politician
- Nava Raj Subedi, Nepalese politician
- Purna Kumari Subedi, Nepalese politician, vice-chairperson of the 1st Nepalese Constituent Assembly
- Ram Hari Subedi, Nepalese politician, member of 2nd Constituent Assembly of Nepal
- Sita Subedi, Nepalese politician
- Surya Subedi, QC, DCL, OBE, British-Nepalese barrister and professor of international law
