= Tumbahamphe =

Tumbahamphe is a surname. Notable people with the surname include:

- Damber Dhoj Tumbahamphe, Nepalese politician
- Shiva Maya Tumbahamphe (born 1964), Nepali politician
