= Baruwal =

Baruwal is a Nepali surname. Notable people with the surname include:

- Bhagat Bahadur Baduwal, Nepalese politician
