= Dindoli =

Dindoli South East Zone
- town
- Location in Gujarat, India
- Coordinates: 21.08°N 72.85°E
- Country: India
- State: Gujarat
- District: Surat

Government
  - Body: Surat Municipal Corporation

Area
  - Total: 19.6 km^{2} (7.6 sq mi)
- Elevation: 12 m (39 ft)

Population (2010)
  - Total: 567,000
  - Density: 28,900/km^{2} (74,900/sq mi)

Languages
  - Official: Gujarati, Hindi
- Time zone: UTC+5:30 (IST)
- Postal code: 394210
- Telephone code: 0261
- Vehicle registration: GJ5
- Nearest city: Surat
- Literacy: 89%
- Civic agency: Surat Municipal Corporation

Dindoli is a zonal town in the city of Surat. Today Dindoli has grown in area and population due to amalgamation of Municipalities of Godadara and Parvat and Town panchayats of Dindoli, Kharavasa . The area is also known for its Haphazard Development due to growth of migrants in the area.
