= Limbayat =

Limbayat South East Zone
- town
- Location in Gujarat, India
- Coordinates: 21.08°N 72.85°E
- Country: India
- State: Gujarat
- District: Surat

Government
  - Body: Surat Municipal Corporation

Area
  - Total: 19.6 km^{2} (7.6 sq mi)
- Elevation: 12 m (39 ft)

Population (2010)
  - Total: 567,000
  - Density: 28,900/km^{2} (74,900/sq mi)

Languages
  - Official: Gujarati, Hindi
- Time zone: UTC+5:30 (IST)
- Postal code: 395012
- Telephone code: 0261
- Vehicle registration: GJ5
- Nearest city: Surat
- Literacy: 89%
- Civic agency: Surat Municipal Corporation

Limbayat is a zonal town in Surat city and one of the hub for shanty towns in Surat.

Limbayat has grown in area and population due to amalgamation of municipalities of Godadara and Parvat and town panchayats of Dindoli, Kharavasa. The area is also known for its haphazard development due to growth of migrants in the area.

In March 2025, the underpass connecting Limbayat-Dindoli near Sai Baba temple in the Udhna Yard area was inaugurated. Spanning 503 meters, it is longest underpass in Gujarat and is built through a collaborative effort between the Surat Municipal Corporation (SMC) and Indian Railways.

It is also one of the 182 Legislative Assembly constituencies of Gujarat state in India. Sangitaben Patil of the Bharatiya Janata Party won for a third time and is the current MLA from Limbayat Assembly constituency from 2022. It has a sizeable muslim population.
