= Nadaf =

Nadaf is a surname. Notable people with the surname include:

- Farmud Nadaf, Nepalese politician
- Hamidreza Nadaf (born 1992), Iranian tennis player

== See also ==
- Naddaf
