= Chalise =

Khas Hindu family name

Chalise (pronounced: /cha.li.se/) (Nepali: चालिसे) is a Khas Hindu family name found in Nepal. Most people with this name are members of the Brahmin caste. According to legend, some priests of Bhattarai caste completed forty ('chalis' in Nepali) chapters of pujas without dropping a single drop of water from their palm. They were then honored with the title Chalise.

== Notable people ==
- Chakrapani Chalise (1883–1958), Nepalese writer
- Janak Kumari Chalise, Nepalese politician
