= Naddaf =

Naddaf is a surname. Notable people with the surname include:

- Gabriel Naddaf (born 1973), Israeli Greek Orthodox priest and judge
- Marie Claude Naddaf, Syrian activist

== See also ==
- Nadaf
