= Godadara =

- City
- Location in Gujarat, India Godadara (India)
- Coordinates: 21.17913°N 72.874374°E
- Country: India
- State: Gujarat
- City: Surat
- Talukas: Choryasi

Area
  - Total: 8.12 km^{2} (3.14 sq mi)
- Elevation: 13 m (43 ft)

Population (2009)
  - Total: 39,870
  - Density: 4,910/km^{2} (12,700/sq mi)

Languages
  - Official: Gujarati, Bhojpuri, Avdhi, Hindi
- Time zone: UTC+5:30 (IST)
- 395010: 395010, 394210
- Telephone code: 0261
- Vehicle registration: GJ-5
- Website: gujaratindia.com

Godadra was a city and a Municipality in Surat City in the Indian state of Gujarat. The town comes under Greater Surat. Godadara is one of the eight amalgamated municipalities in Surat and was added to Limbayat Zone.

== Geography ==
The city is located at an average elevation of 15 metres (66 feet).

== Demographics ==
As of 2001 India census, Godadra had a population of 21870 . Males constitute 52% of the population and females 48%. Sachin has an average literacy rate of 74%, higher than the national average of 59.5%: male literacy is 81%, and female literacy is 63%. In Sachin, 14% of the population is under 6 years of age.

== Transport ==
By road: Godadra is 14 km from Udhana and 8 km from Surat.

By air: Nearest airport is Surat which is 30 km from Godadra.

== See also ==
- List of tourist attractions in Surat
