= Raghav Lal Baidya =

Attorney General of Nepal

Raghav Lal Baidya (Nepali:राघबलाल बैद्य) is the Attorney General of Nepal. He was previously a judge in the Janakpur Appellate Court. Baidya was appointed to Attorney General on August 21, 2008, by President Ram Baran Yadav upon the recommendation by Prime Minister Pushpa Kamal Dahal.
