= Ganga Datta Joshi =

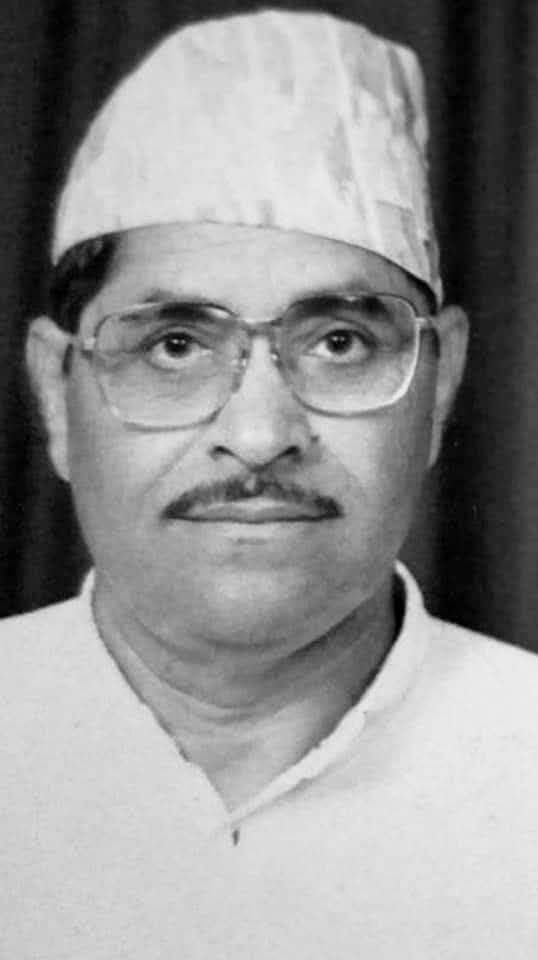
- Ganga Datta Joshi
- Born: Ganga Datta Joshi; 10 June 1936; Nautadi-02, Dadeldhura
- Died: 10 February, 2021; Mahendranagar, Kanchanpur
- Notable work: Establishment of Far Western University, Bhrikuti Secondary School, Mahakali Hospital, Ninglashaini School, Kanchan Vidya Mandir,Geta Hospital and the Nepal Red Cross Society in Mahendranagar, among other educational, health, and social institutions.
- Movement: 1990 People's Movement and 2006 People's Movement (Jana Andolan I and II)
- Spouse: Maheshswori Devi Joshi
- Children: 9 (Prem Ballav Joshi, Tekendra Prasad Joshi, Keshav Datta Joshi)

Ganga Datta Joshi (10 Jun 1936-10 Feb 2021) was a Nepalese politician and a member of the Nepali Congress Party. He served as a lawmaker in the National assembly, the upper house of Nepal's Parliament. Within his party, he also held the significant leadership position of district president for the Kanchanpur constituency.

== Biography ==
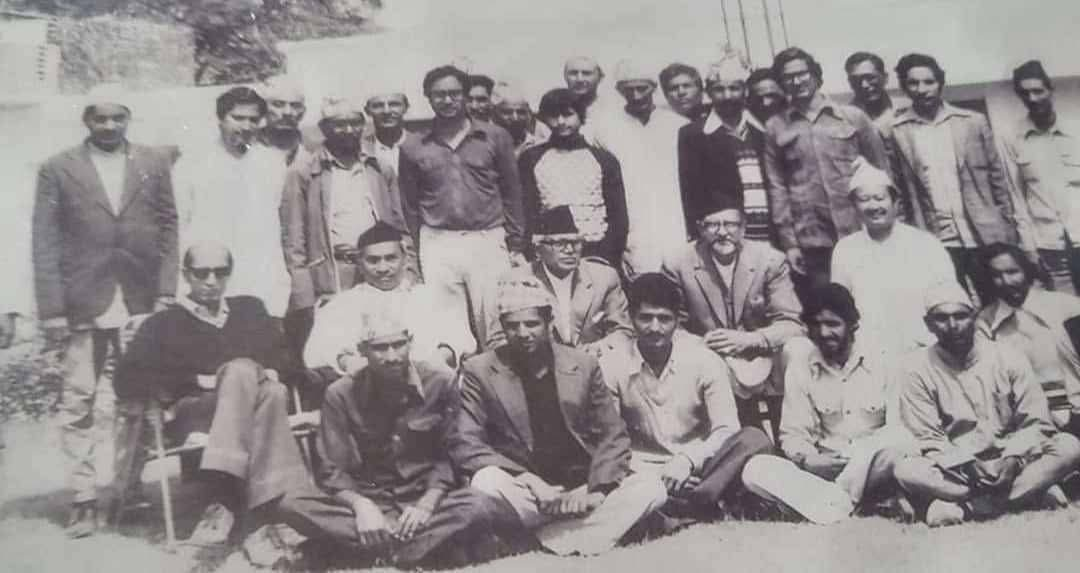
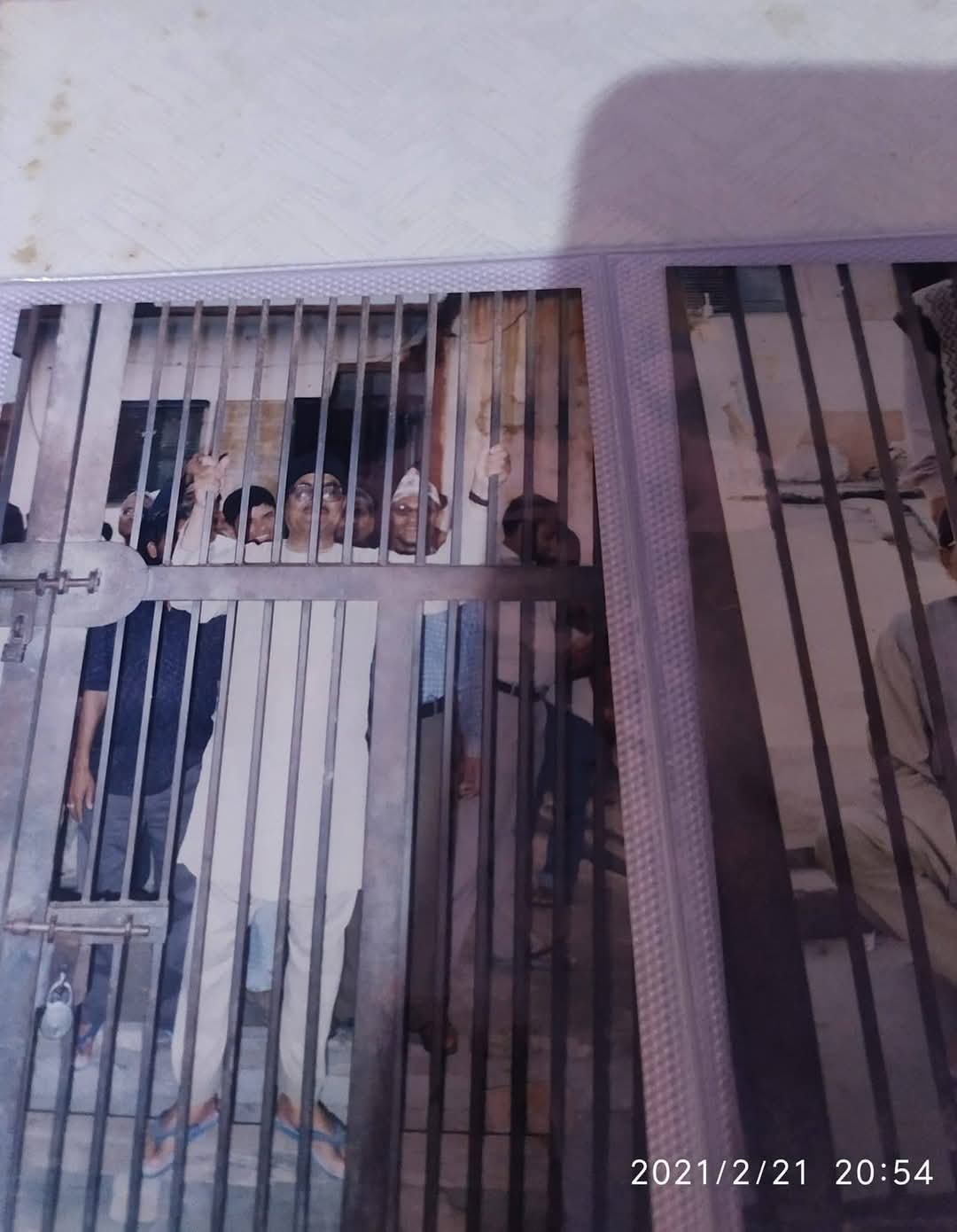
Originally from Nepal's western district of Dadeldhura, Ganga Datta Joshi later relocated to Mahendranagar, where he has resided for many years. Joshi was a long-term resident of Mahendranagar who actively participated in the struggle for the restoration of democracy in Nepal's Far Western Region. He was imprisoned for his participation in the pro-democracy movement in Nepal. In 2013, Joshi served as a member of the Nepali Congress Mahakali Zonal Coordination Committee, formed by late party president Sushil Koirala. He was one of the founding leaders of the Nepal Farmers' Union. He served as a member of the Social Justice Committee of the National Assembly, chaired by Ambika Basnet. He also introduced the Honorary University Bill, 2058 (2001) as a private member's bill on 30 September 2001; however, it did not proceed to enactment.

== Death ==
On 10 Feb 2021, the 84-year-old Joshi, who had high blood pressure, experienced a heart attack in Mahendranagar, Kanchanpur, while traveling to Geta Eye Hospital. He passed away during his subsequent transfer to Mahakali Hospital.

== Legacy ==
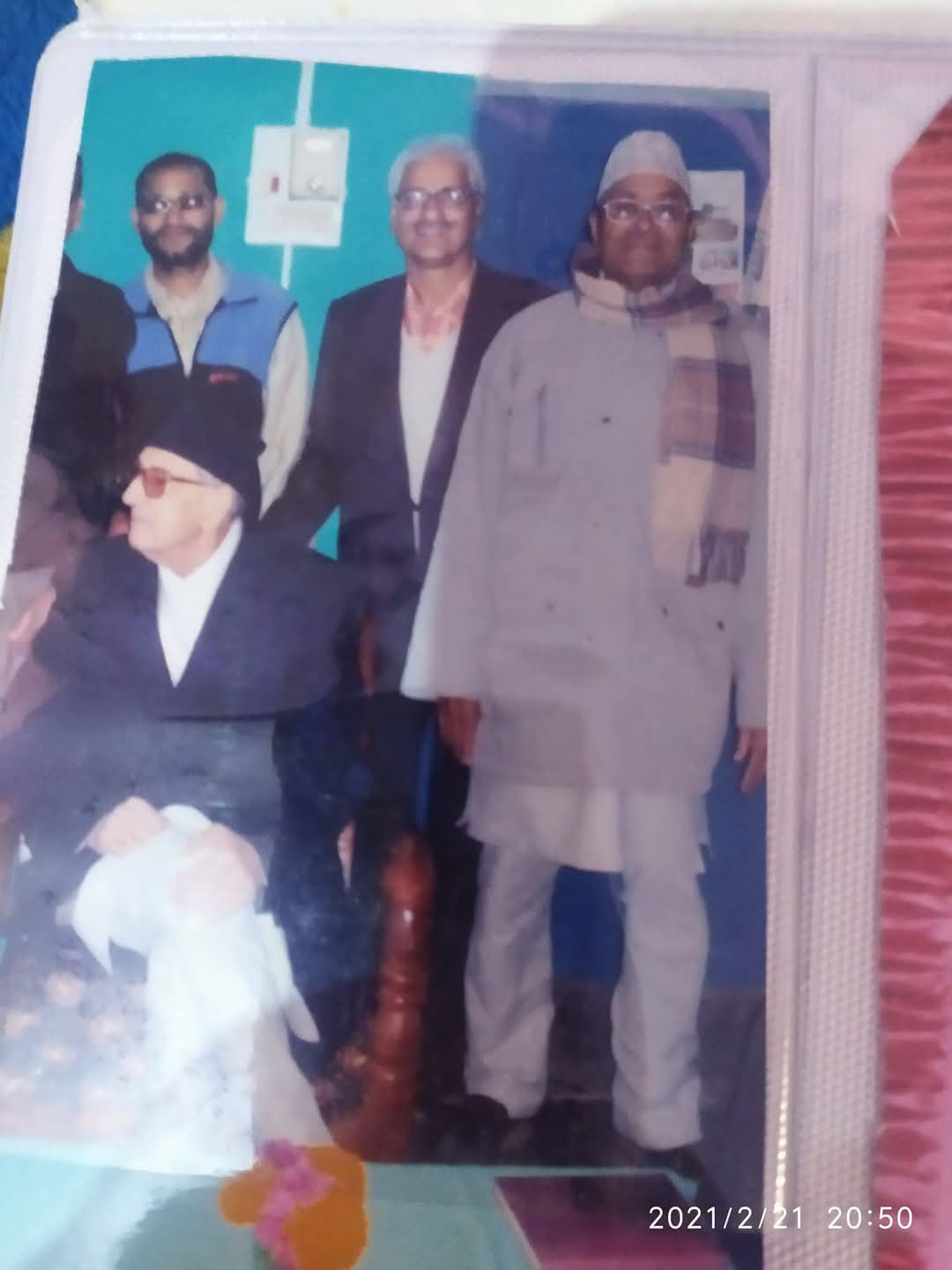
Through his active involvement in key educational institutions and regional initiatives, Ganga Datta Joshi played a pivotal role in advancing higher and technical education throughout the Sudurpashchim region. Ganga Datta Joshi served as the Chairman of the Far Western University (FWU) Struggle Committee. The committee organized a series of protests over several years advocating for the university's establishment in Bhimdatta (Mahendranagar). The Far Western University was formally established by an Act of Parliament in 2010, and its central office officially opened in January 2012. Ganga Datta Joshi was also an industrialist. Along with his son, he operated three industries in Mahendranagar: Joshi Dhuwani Sewa, Joshi Rice Mill, and Bhageshwori Furniture Industry.
