= Bishal Khadka =

Nepali politician

- बिशाल खड्का

Office of the Chief Minister and Council of Ministers
- President: Bidhya Devi Bhandari
- Prime Minister: Sher Bahadur Deuba

Personal details
- Born: April 15, 1982 (age 44)

Bishal Khadka is Nepalese politician. He was Forest and Environment Minister of Bagmati Province. He has served as a Central Committee Member of Unified Communist Party of Nepal (Maoist) and In-charge of Dolakha District of Unified Communist Party of Nepal (Maoist). He is a current elected representative of Province 3, Dolakha-1 (A).

== Political career ==
He has served as a Central Committee Member of Unified Communist Party of Nepal (Maoist) and deputy In-charge of Dolakha District of Unified Communist Party of Nepal (Maoist). He is a current elected representative of Province 3, Dolakha-1 (A).

== Personal life ==
He has married to Sobi Budhathoki since March 10, 2013.
