= Moti Lal Dugar =

Nepali politician

Motilal Dugad
- मोतीलाल दुगड

Member of Parliament, Pratinidhi Sabha for CPN (UML) party list
- In office 4 March 2018 – 18 September 2022

Member of Constituent Assembly for Sadbhawana (Anandidevi) party list
- Incumbent
- Assumed office 28 May 2008
- Incumbent
- Assumed office 28 May 2012

Personal details
- Born: 20 April 1960 (age 65)
- Party: CPN (UML)
- Other political affiliations: Nepal Sadbhavana Party (Anandidevi); Nawa Nepal Nirman Party

Moti Lal Dugar is a Nepali industrialist and a member of the House of Representatives of the Federal Parliament. In the 2017 election, he was elected to parliament from CPN UML under the proportional representation system filling the reserved seat for Madhesi group.
