= Gunakhar Basyal =

Nepali politician

- गुणाखर वस्याल
- Incumbent
- Assumed office 2008
- Constituency: Parvat-2
- Majority: 15678

Personal details
- Party: Communist Party of Nepal (Maoist)

Gunakhar Basyal (Nepali: गुणकेशर बस्याल) is a Nepalese politician, belonging to the Communist Party of Nepal (Maoist). In the 2008 Constituent Assembly election he was elected from the Parvat-2 constituency, winning 15678 votes.
