= Matrika Prasad Yadav =

Nepali politician

Honourable Matrika Prasad Yadav
- मातृका प्रसाद यादव
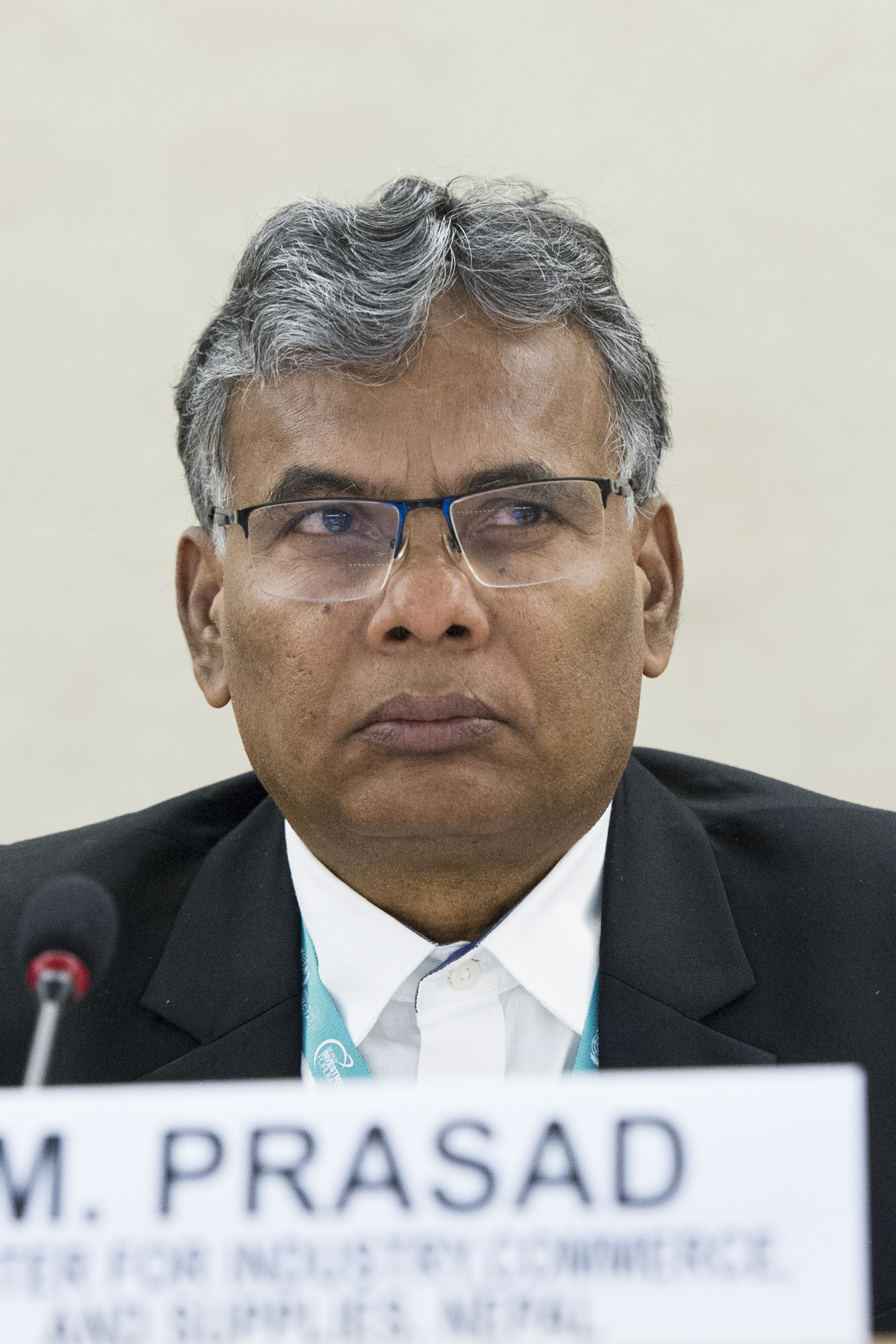
- Yadav in 2018

Minister of Industry, Commerce and Supplies of Nepal
- In office 26 February 2018 – 20 November 2019
- President: Bidhya Devi Bhandari
- Prime Minister: Khadga Prasad Oli
- Preceded by: Sunil Bahadur Thapa
- Succeeded by: Lekh Raj Bhatta

Minister for Land Reform
- In office 2008–2009
- President: Ram Baran Yadav
- Prime Minister: Pushpa Kamal Dahal

Member of Parliament, Pratinidhi Sabha
- Incumbent
- Assumed office 4 March 2018
- Preceded by: Dinesh Prasad Parsaila
- Constituency: Dhanusha 1

Member of Constituent Assembly for CPN (Maoist) party list
- In office 28 May 2008 – March 2009

Personal details
- Born: October 16, 1958 (age 67) Nepal
- Party: CPN (Maoist Centre)

Matrika Prasad Yadav (Nepali: मातृका प्रसाद यादव) is a Nepalese politician. He served as the Industry, Commerce, and Supplies Minister of Nepal in the Second Oli Cabinet and as Minister of Land Reform in the First Dahal Cabinet. He is a leader of the Nepal Communist Party. Yadav hosted the seventh ‘Made in Nepal’ Expo in Lalitpur from 28 to 29 September 2019.

== See also ==
- List of Nepalese politicians
