= Padma Jyoti =

Nepali politician

Padma Jyoti Kansakar

President of the South Asian Association for Regional Cooperation Chambers of Commerce and Industry

Personal details
- Occupation: industrialist

Padma Jyoti Kansakar (Nepali: पद्मज्योति) is a Nepalese industrialist and politician. Trained in management and technology, Jyoti is the former chairman of Jyoti Group of Companies and was the president of the Federation of Nepalese Chamber of Commerce and Industry. In 2002 he was elected as president of the South Asian Association for Regional Cooperation Chambers of Commerce and Industry (SCCI) at the 8th SCCI General Assembly. He holds a degree from a MIT. He oversees many operations for several industries under Jyoti Group.

The Jyoti Group developed from a business house established by his grandfather Bhaju Ratna Kansakar in the 1930s in Kalimpong, India and subsequently expanded by his father Maniharsha Jyoti. It conducted trade between Nepal, India and Tibet over the caravan route across the Himalaya. The group donated रू 10,000,000 to the Prime Minister's Natural Disaster Relief Fund in August 2026 following the 2026 Nepal floods.
