= Sarala Regmi =

Nepali politician

- सरला रेग्मी
- Incumbent
- Assumed office 2008
- Constituency: Bardiya-1

Personal details
- Party: Communist Party of Nepal (Maoist)

Sarala Regmi (Nepali: सरला रेग्मी) is a Nepalese politician, belonging to the Communist Party of Nepal (Maoist). In January 2007 she was nominated to the interim legislature of Nepal on behalf of the pre-split CPN (Maoist) (later renamed UCPN (Maoist)). In April 2008, she won the Bardiya-1 seat in the Constituent Assembly election, defeating veteran CPN (UML) leader Bam Dev Gautam.

She belonged to the hardline faction inside UCPN (Maoist), and after the split in the party she became a Central Committee member of the new CPN (Maoist).
