= Malabar Singh Thapa =

Nepali politician

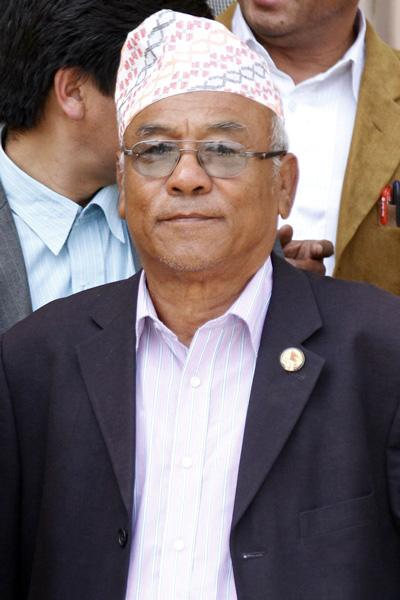

Malbar Singh Thapa (Nepali: मलाबर सिंह थापा) is a Nepalese politician, belonging to the Rastriya Janamukti Party. After the 2008 Constituent Assembly election, he was selected to represent the party in the Syangja District from the closed list proportional representation system. Thapa had contested the 1994 legislative election in the Rupandehi-3 seat as the RJMP candidate. Then he got 1815 votes.

He was named Minister for Labour and Transport Management in 2012.
