= Dipak Karki (Jhapa politician) =

Nepalese politician

Personal details
- Party: CPN (UML)

Dipak Karki is a Nepalese politician, belonging to the Communist Party of Nepal (UML). In April 2008, he won the Jhapa-6 seat in the Constituent Assembly election with 14196 votes.
