= Satya Pahadi =

Nepali politician

- सत्य पहाडी
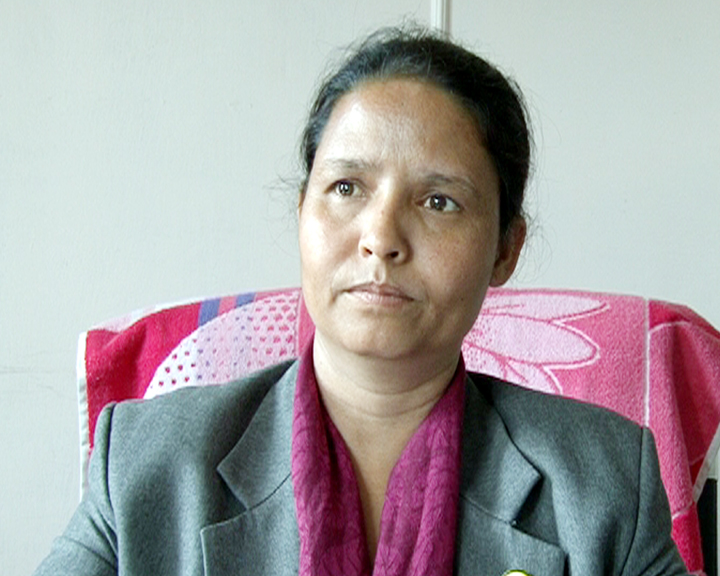

Minister of Peace and Reconstruction
- In office 2011–Present
- President: Rambaran Yadav
- Prime Minister: Baburam Bhattarai

Member of Parliament, Pratinidhi Sabha for CPN (Maoist Centre) party list
- Incumbent
- Assumed office 4 March 2018

Member of Constituent Assembly for UCPN (Maoist) party list
- In office 28 May 2008 – 28 May 2012

Personal details
- Born: 23 September 1977 (age 48) Dolpa District
- Party: CPN (Maoist Centre)
- Other party: Samyukta Janamorcha
- Spouse: Shakti Bahadur Basnet

Satya Pahadi (Nepali: सत्य पहाडी) is a member of the Pratinidhi Sabha of Nepal. She is former Minister of Peace and Reconstruction of Nepal.
