= Keshav Prasad Mainali =

Nepali politician

Keshav Prasad Mainali (Nepali: केसव प्रसाद मैनाली) is a Nepalese politician. He currently belongs to Nepali Congress. He was the chairman of the Chure Bhawar Rastriya Ekta Party Nepal. He joined the Nepal Student Union in the late 1960s. He later became the president of the Nepali Congress Sarlahi District committee. He left the Nepali Congress, and founded the Chure Bhawar Ekta Samaj in 2006. This organization later became the Chure Bhawar Rastriya Ekta Party Nepal.

In the 2008 Constituent Assembly election, the party won 1 seat through the Proportional Representation vote. Mainali became the representative of the party in the assembly.

In 2010, Mainali was expelled from the Chure Bhawar Rastriya Ekta Party Nepal and he founded a new party, Chure Bhawar Rastriya Party.
