= Mohan Prasad Pandey =

Nepali politician

- मोहन प्रसाद पाण्डे

Member of Parliament, Pratinidhi Sabha for Nepali Congress party list
- Incumbent
- Assumed office 23 November 2020

Member of Constituent Assembly
- In office 28 May 2008 – 28 May 2012
- Preceded by: Shanker Prasad Pandey
- Succeeded by: Constituency abolished
- Constituency: Syangja 3

Personal details
- Born: 10 December 1962 (age 63)
- Party: Nepali Congress

Mohan Prasad Pandey (Nepali: मोहन प्रसाद पाण्डे) is a Nepalese politician, belonging to the Nepali Congress. In the 2008 Constituent Assembly election he was elected from the Syangja-3 constituency, winning with 18419 votes. Pandey was elected for the first time with two other congress candidates in the district.
