= Jun Kumari Roka (Oli) =

Nepali politician

- जुनकुमारी रोका
- Incumbent
- Assumed office 2008
- Constituency: Rukum-1

Personal details
- Party: Communist Party of Nepal (Maoist)

Jun Kumari Roka (Oli) (Nepali: जुनकुमारी रोका) is a Nepalese politician, belonging to the Communist Party of Nepal (Maoist). In the 2008 Constituent Assembly election she was elected from the Rukum-1 constituency by winning 31410 votes, defeating the incumbent Nepali Congress MP Keshar Man Rokka by a wide margin.
