= Gauri Shankar Khadka =

Nepali politician

- गौरीशंकर खँड्का

Member of the House of Representatives
- In office 2008–2009
- Preceded by: KP Sharma Oli
- Succeeded by: Sudhir Kumar Siwakoti
- Constituency: Jhapa 2

Personal details
- Party: Unified Communist Party of Nepal (Maoist)

Gauri Shankar Khadka (Nepali: गौरीशंकर खँड्का) is a Nepalese politician, belonging to the Communist Party of Nepal (Maoist). In April 2008, he won the Jhapa-2 seat in the Constituent Assembly election with 18580 votes.
