= Bishwodip Lingden Limbu =

Nepali politician

- विश्वदीप लिङ्देन लिम्बू

Member of Constituent Assembly
- In office 2008–2013
- President: Ram Baran Yadav
- Prime Minister: Girija Prasad Koirala
- Constituency: Jhapa 7

Personal details
- Party: Nepali Congress (2017-present)
- Other political affiliations: Communist Party of Nepal (Maoist) (till 2015); Naya Shakti Party, Nepal (2015-2017)

Bishwodip Lingden Limbu (Nepali: विश्वदीप लिङदेन) is a Nepalese politician, belonging to the Nepali Congress. In the 2008 Nepalese Constituent Assembly election, he won the Jhapa-7 seat in the Constituent Assembly election with 16099 votes defeating his nearest rival KP Sharma Oli.

== Electoral history ==
=== 2008 Nepalese Constituent Assembly election ===
Jhapa–7
Party	Candidate	Votes	Status
CPN (Maoist)	Bishwodip Lingden Limbu	16,099	Elected
CPN (UML)	K.P. Sharma Oli	14,959	Lost
