= Uma Kant Sharma =

Nepali politician

- उमाकान्त शर्मा
- Incumbent
- Assumed office 2008
- Constituency: Salyan-2

Personal details
- Party: Communist Party of Nepal (Maoist)

Uma Kant Sharma (Nepali: उमाकान्त शर्मा) is a Nepalese politician, belonging to the Communist Party of Nepal (Maoist). In the 2008 Constituent Assembly election he was elected from the Salyan-2 constituency, winning 17992 votes.
