= Parvat =

- city
- Location in Gujarat, India Parvat (India)
- Coordinates: 21.180°N 72.868°E
- Country: India
- State: Gujarat
- District: Surat

Area
  - Total: 9 km^{2} (3.5 sq mi)
- Elevation: 19 m (62 ft)

Population (2001)
  - Total: 20,694
  - Density: 2,300/km^{2} (6,000/sq mi)

Languages
  - Official: Gujarati, Hindi
- Time zone: UTC+5:30 (IST)
- Telephone code: 0261
- Vehicle registration: GJ5
- Website: www.suratmunicipal.gov.in

Parvat was City and a Municipality in Surat district in the Indian state of Gujarat. The town is roughly 8 km from Surat. As in 2006 Eight Municipalities Amalgamated in Surat and Parvat is one of those which was added to Limbayat Zone.

== Demographics ==
As of 2001 India census, Parvat had a population of 20,694. Males constitute 59% of the population and females 41%. Parvat has an average literacy rate of 64%, higher than the national average of 59.5%: male literacy is 71%, and female literacy is 53%. In Parvat, 15% of the population is under 6 years of age.

== See also ==
- List of tourist attractions in Surat
