= Surita Kumari Sah =

Nepalese politician

Honourable Surita Kumari Sah
- सुरिता कुमारी साह

Province Assembly Member of Madhesh Province
- Incumbent
- Assumed office 2017
- Preceded by: N/A
- Constituency: Mahottari 2 (constituency)

Personal details
- Born: March 3, 1966 (age 60)
- Party: Loktantrik Samajwadi Party, Nepal
- Occupation: Politician

Surita Kumari Sah (Nepali: सुरिता कुमारी साह) is a Nepalese politician. She is a member of Provincial Assembly of Madhesh Province from Loktantrik Samajwadi Party, Nepal. Sah, a resident of Mahottari Rural Municipality, was elected via 2017 Nepalese provincial elections from Mahottari 2(B).

== Electoral history ==
=== 2017 Nepalese provincial elections ===
| Party | Candidate | Votes |
|---|---|---|
| Rastriya Janata Party Nepal | Surita Kumari Sah | 15,440 |
| Nepali Congress | Raj Karan Prasad Sah Sudi | 6,497 |
| Communist Party of Nepal (Maoist Centre) | Ajay Kumar Yadav | 1,708 |
| Others | | 1,918 |
| Invalid votes | | 1,368 |
| Result | RJPN gain | |
Source: Election Commission
