= Kul Prasad Nepal =

Nepalese politician

- कूल प्रसाद नेपाल
- Incumbent
- Assumed office 2008
- Constituency: Palpa-3

Personal details
- Party: Communist Party of Nepal (Unified Marxist-Leninist)

Kul Prasad Nepal (Nepali: कूल प्रसाद नेपाल) is a Nepalese politician, belonging to the Communist Party of Nepal (Unified Marxist-Leninist). In April 2008, he won the Palpa-3 seat in the Constituent Assembly election.

Elected to the Constituent Assembly from constituency no. 2 of Palpa, CA member Kul Prasad Nepal is a member of CPN-UMLs district committee. The 57-year-old Nepal's political career began in 1967 when he joined left politics. He spent three years in jail on the charges of involvement in anti-Panchayat activities. During the run-up to the democratic movement in 1989, he was the president of Bammorchas district committee for Palpa and since 1991 he has been a member of CPN-UMLs district committee. He is a graduate in Political Science. He says that party's agenda and his broad public relations accounts for his victory in the CA polls. Nepal, who had taken part in the 1991s parliamentary elections, is, besides politics, is interested in social service. He believes that the new constitution to be drafted through consensus and coordination of all the parties can sketch out the future of new Nepal. He says that institutionalization of democratic republican order and inclusive representation of all in state affairs are the two agendas he wants to raise in the Constituent Assembly.
