= Purna Kumari Subedi =

Nepalese politician

- पूर्ण कुमारी सुवेदी

Deputy Chair of the 1st Constituent Assembly
- In office 29 November 2008 – 28 May 2012
- Preceded by: Position established
- Succeeded by: Onsari Gharti Magar

Member of Parliament, Pratinidhi Sabha for CPN (Maoist Centre) party list
- Incumbent
- Assumed office 4 March 2018

Member of Constituent Assembly
- In office 28 May 2008 – 28 May 2012
- Preceded by: Constituency established
- Succeeded by: Dal Bahadur Sunar
- Constituency: Banke 4

Personal details
- Born: 12 September 1958 (age 67)
- Party: CPN (Maoist Centre)

Purna Kumari Subedi (Nepali: पूर्ण कुमारी सुवेदी) is a Nepalese politician, belonging to the Communist Party of Nepal (Maoist) who served as the vice chairperson of the Constituent Assembly. In the 2008 Constituent Assembly election she was elected from the Banke-4 constituency, winning 13884 votes.
