= Chandra Bahadur Thapa =

Nepali politician

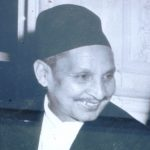

Chandra Bahadur Thapa (Nepali: चन्द्रबहादुर थापा), a.k.a. 'Sagar', was a Nepalese politician, belonging to the then Communist Party of Nepal (Maoist). Thapa was the Kathmandu Valley in-charge of the Young Communist League. During the people's war period, he was the commander of the Dinesh-Ramji Smriti Brigade of the People's Liberation Army. In the 2008 Constituent Assembly election he was elected from the Gulmi-3 constituency, winning 16581 votes. Then he left communist ideology and joined Tribhuvan University Kirtipur based socio-academic movement called "Aarthik Krantiko Abhiyan". The movement which was led by KP Bhusal, the then Tribhuvan University student who is now known as one of the Nepalese motivational speakers.
