= Rupa So.Si. Chaudhari =

Nepali politician

- रुपा सोसी चौधरी
- Incumbent
- Assumed office 2008
- Constituency: Kailali-1

Personal details
- Party: Communist Party of Nepal (Maoist Centre)

Rupa So.Si. Chaudhari (Nepali: रुपा सोसी चौधरी) is a Nepalese politician, belonging to the Communist Party of Nepal (Maoist Centre). In the 2008 Constituent Assembly election she was elected from the Kailali-1 constituency, winning 21780 votes.
