= Lila Kumari Bagale Somai =

Nepalese politician

- लिला कुमारी बगाले सोमई
- Incumbent
- Assumed office 2008
- Constituency: Palpa-2

Personal details
- Party: Communist Party of Nepal (Maoist)

Lila Kumari Bagale Somai (Nepali: लिला कुमारी बगाले सोमई) is a Nepalese politician, belonging to the Communist Party of Nepal (Maoist). In April 2008, she won the Palpa-2 seat in the Constituent Assembly election, defeating the sitting CPN(UML) MP Som Prasad Pandey. Somai got 12750 votes whereas Pandey got 10929 votes.
