= Janak Kumari Chalise =

Nepalese politician

Personal details
- Party: CPN(ML)

Janak Kumari Chalise (Nepali: जनक कुमारी चालिसे) is a Nepalese politician of Lalitpur district, a member of the Central Committee of Communist Party of Nepal (Marxist-Leninist), and the All Nepal Progressive Women's Association.

After the 2008 Constituent Assembly election she became a 1st Nepalese Constituent Assembly member.
