= Durga Kumari B.K. =

Nepali politician

Durga Kumari Bishwakarma
- दुर्गा कुमारी विश्वकर्मा

Member of Parliament, Pratinidhi Sabha for CPN (Maoist Centre) party list
- Incumbent
- Assumed office 4 March 2018

Member of Constituent Assembly
- In office 28 May 2008 – 28 May 2012
- Preceded by: Constituency created
- Succeeded by: Sita Giri
- Constituency: Kaski 4

Personal details
- Born: 22 January 1982 (age 44) Kaski District
- Party: CPN (Maoist Centre)

Durga Kumari B.K. (Nepali: दुर्गा कुमारी बि.क) is a Nepali politician, belonging to the Communist Party of Nepal (Maoist). In the 2008 Nepalese Constituent Assembly election, she was elected from the newly created Kaski-4 constituency, winning 14,866 votes. At the age of 26, she was the youngest female Assembly member elected through the first-past-the post system.

== Political career ==
B.K. rose to national prominence during the 2008 Constituent Assembly elections. At age 26, she was elected from the Kaski-4 constituency, making her the youngest female member of the Assembly elected through the first-past-the-post system.

During her tenure in the Constituent Assembly (2008–2012), she was an active member of the Women's Caucus, where she served as the Member Secretary for the Coordination and Communication committee, advocating for women's representation in the new constitution.

In 2018, she was elected to the House of Representatives under the party list of the CPN (Maoist Centre).
