= Chinak Kurmi =

Nepali politician

Personal details
- Party: Pragatisheel Loktantrik Party

Chinak Kurmi (Nepali: चिनक कुर्मी) is a Nepalese politician, belonging to the Pragatisheel Loktantrik Party.

During the Nepal Civil War, Kurmi was arrested. He was released in 2003. In the 2008 Constituent Assembly election, he was elected from the Nawalparasi-4 constituency, having received 10,592 votes.
