= Omprakash Yadav =

Nepali politician

Omprakash Yadav (Nepali: ओमप्रकाश यादव) is a Nepalese politician, belonging to the Madhesi Janadhikar Forum. In the 2008 Constituent Assembly election he was elected from the Rupandehi-6 constituency, winning 12170 votes.
