= Farmud Nadaf =

Nepali politician

- फरमुद नदाफ

Personal details
- Party: CPN (UML)

Farmud Nadaf (Nepali: फरमुद नदाफ) is a Nepalese politician and province secretary of CPN (UML).

== Political career ==
He was a member of the Dhanusa District Development Committee during the early 2000s.

He had joined the CPN (Maoist Centre) after the peace process had begun. Nadaf was sworn in as a Constituent Assembly member, along with Ram Kumar Paswan, on August 6, 2010 as a representative of the Unified Communist Party of Nepal (Maoist). Nadaf and Paswan were sworn in after two Maoist CA members (Matrika Prasad Yadav and Jagat Prasad Yadav) had been expelled from the Assembly after having split away from the Maoist party.

Nadaf's appointment caused protests amongst Maoist cadres in Dhanusa. The local party organization had suggested Tara Mahato (widow of a Maoist martyr). After Nadaf was sworn in 75 members of the Mithila Madhes State Council resigned.
