= Govinda Paudel =

Nepali politician

- गोविन्द पौडेल
- Incumbent
- Assumed office 2013
- Constituency: Myagdi-1

Personal details
- Party: Communist Party of Nepal (Maoist)
- Profession: worked with Consolidated coin company Faridabad Haryana India

Govinda Paudel (Nepali: गोविन्द पौडेल) is a Nepalese politician, belonging to the Communist Party of Nepal (Maoist). In the 2008 Constituent Assembly election he was elected from the Myagdi-1 constituency, winning 23102 votes.
