= Chandra Lal Meche =

Nepali politician

Narayan Prasad Marasini

Personal details
- Party: Communist Party of Nepal (Maoist)

Chandra Lal Meche (Nepali: चन्द्रलाल मेचे) is a Nepalese politician from Jhapa District, belonging to the Communist Party of Nepal.

After the 2008 Constituent Assembly election Meche was not included amongst those elected through the proportional representation vote, something that caused local Maoist activists in Charali to vandalise their party office in protest. Meche was however later nominated to the Constituent Assembly.

Meche is a close friend of Anirban Roy, writer of the best-selling book---Prachanda: The Unknown Revolutionary.
