= Karn Jit Budhathoki =

Nepalese politician

- करणजीत बुडाथोकी
- Incumbent
- Assumed office 2008
- Constituency: Humla-1

Personal details
- Party: Communist Party of Nepal (Maoist)

Karn Jit Budhathoki (Nepali: करणजीत बुडाथोकी) is a Nepalese politician, belonging to the Communist Party of Nepal (Maoist). In the 2008 Constituent Assembly election he was elected from the Humla-1 constituency, winning 13318 votes.
