= Krishna Kumar Chaudhari =

Nepalese politician

Krishna Kumar Chaudhari (Nepali: कृष्णकुमार चौधरी) is a Nepalese politician, belonging to the Communist Party of Nepal (Maoist). In the 2008 Constituent Assembly election he was elected from the Kailali-4 constituency, winning 27,547 votes.
