= Muhammad Okil Musalman =

Nepali politician

- मोहम्मद ओकिल मुसलमान
- Incumbent
- Assumed office 2008
- Constituency: Rupandehi-7

Personal details
- Party: Nepal Socialist Party

Muhammad Okil Musalman (Nepali: मोहम्मद ओकिल मुसलमान) is a Nepalese politician from the Nepal Socialist Party. In the 2008 Constituent Assembly election, he was elected from the Rupandehi-7 constituency, with 8,121 votes, as a Madhesi Janadhikar Forum candidate.
