= Hasina Miya =

Nepali politician

Personal details
- Party: CPN (UML)

Hasina Miya (Nepali: हसिना मिया) is a Nepalese politician, who is the member of Communist Party of Nepal (Unified Marxist-Leninist). Following the 2008 Constituent Assembly election, she was selected by CPN (UML) from the Proportional Representation quota to represent the party in the assembly. Earlier, Miya ran a bangle shop in Dulegauda, Tanahu District.
