= Chandra Bahadur Gurung =

Nepali politician

Personal details
- Party: Communist Party of Nepal (Unified Marxist-Leninist)

Chandra Bahadur Gurung (Nepali: चन्द्रबहादुर गुरुङ) is a Nepalese politician, belonging to the Communist Party of Nepal (Unified Marxist-Leninist). In the 2008 Constituent Assembly election he was elected from the Mustang-1 constituency, winning 2456 votes.
