= Sita Devi Boudel =

Nepali politician

- सीतादेबी बौडेल
- Incumbent
- Assumed office 2008
- Constituency: Nawalparasi-3

Personal details
- Party: Communist Party of Nepal (Maoist)

Sita Devi Boudel (Nepali: सीतादेबी बौडेल)is a Nepalese politician, belonging to the Communist Party of Nepal (Maoist). In the 2008 Constituent Assembly election she was elected from the Nawalparasi-3 constituency, winning 13535 votes.
