= Chure Bhawar Rastriya Ekta Party Nepal =

Chure Bhawar Rastriya Ekta Party Nepal चुरेभावर राष्ट्रिय एकता पार्टी नेपाल
- President: Keshav Prasad Mainali (suspended)
- Founded: 2007
- Headquarters: Kathmandu

Election symbol

Chure Bhawar Rastriya Ekta Party Nepal (Nepali: चुरे भावर राष्ट्रिय एकता पार्टी नेपाल) is a political party in Nepal. The party was registered with the Election Commission of Nepal ahead of the 2008 Constituent Assembly election. The Chure Bhawar Rastriya Ekta Samaj (CBES), emerged in the northern areas of the central Terai, demanding a Chure federal state comprising bhawar and chure range. The group led a series of protests thereafter. Before registering as a party, the organization's name was Chure Bhawar Rastriya Ekta Samaj, which was formed in the beginning of 2007 after many Madhesi armed outfits started repeatedly attack and kill people of hilly origin in the Terai region. The party was formed in 2007, seeking to defend the interests of people of Hilly origin living in Terai. The party has filed its candidate list for the proportional system election.

Chure Bhawar Rastriya Ekta Party has also its own ' Shanti Shena', a militant outfit. The Party has been launching agitation demanding autonomy in Chure Bhawar region by opposing demands for 'single Madhes' raised by Madhesi parties.

In the party won 1 seat through the Proportional Representation vote in the CA election. The party nominated its leader Badri Prasad Neupane to be its representative in the assembly.

After the election of Pushpa Kamal Dahal as Prime Minister of Nepal, an election in which Mainali has voted in favour of Dahal, dissent erupted inside the party. On August 19, 2008, the Central Committee of the party decided to suspend Mainali for three months and appointed Megh Bahadur Thapa as acting party leader. In 2010, Mainali was expelled from the party and he founded a new party, Chure Bhawar Rastriya Party.

== See also ==
- Chure region
