= Sadrul Miya Haque =

Nepalese politician

Personal details
- Party: independent

Sadrul Miya Haque (Nepali: सदरुल मियाँ हक) was a Nepalese politician, who won the Saptari-5 seat independently in the 2008 Constituent Assembly election as an independent candidate. Haque won the seat with 10603 votes.

Haque was murdered Bishanpur (Kalyanpur-2) in May 2013. He was 55 years old at the time.
