= Dal Bahadur Sunar =

Nepali politician

Personal details
- Born: October 1, 1959 (age 66) Dandakhali-5, Surkhet
- Party: Communist Party of Nepal (Unified Socialist)
- Parents: Nanda Bir Sunar; Lalita Sunar

Dal Bahadur Sunar (Nepali: दलबहादुर सुनार) is a Nepali politician belonging to CPN (Unified Socialist) and is co-leader of the party for Lumbini Province. He has served as a member of the 2nd Nepalese Constituent Assembly. He had won the Banke 4 seat in CA assembly, 2013 from the Communist Party of Nepal (Unified Marxist–Leninist).
