= Harka Bahadur Singh =

Nepali politician

- हर्क बहादुर सिंह

Member of Constituent Assembly
- In office 2008–2013
- Succeeded by: Bir Bahadur Balayar
- Constituency: Doti-1

Personal details
- Party: Communist Party of Nepal (Unified Socialist)

Harka Bahadur Singh (Nepali: हर्क बहादुर सिंह) is a Nepalese politician, belonging to the CPN (Unified Socialist). In the 2008 Constituent Assembly election he was elected from the Doti-1 constituency, winning 14,506 votes.
