= Shiv Raj Gautam =

Nepali politician

- Shiv Raj

Personal details
- Party: Communist Party of Nepal (Maoist) Previous Party (UML)

Shiv Raj Gautam (Nepali: शिवराज गौतम) is a Nepalese politician, belonging to the Communist Party of Nepal and Previously member of (UML) Unified Marxist–Leninist. In the 2008 Constituent Assembly election he was elected from the Dang-4 constituency, winning 18,854 votes.
