= Sita Subedi =

Nepalese politician

Personal details
- Party: Nepal Communist Party

Sita Subedi (Nepali: सीता सुबेदि) is a Nepalese politician. She was the president of the Nepal Progressive Women's Federation. She also served as a Central Committee member of the Communist Party of Nepal (United Marxist). She was nominated as a FPTP candidate for the Communist Party of Nepal (United Marxist) in the 2008 Constituent Assembly election. Subedi contested the Kathmandu-9 constituency, but only mustered 55 votes (0.1%).

Ahead of the 2013 Constituent Assembly election, Subedi was nominated as a candidate by the Communist Party of Nepal. She was placed as the top candidate on the Proportional Representation list of the party.
