= Narayan Prasad Adhikari =

Nepali politician

- नारायण प्रसाद अधिकारी
- Incumbent
- Assumed office 2008

Personal details
- Party: CPN (Maoist)

Narayan Prasad Adhikari (Nepali: नारायण प्रसाद अधिकारी) is a Nepalese politician, belonging to the CPN (Maoist). In the 2008 Constituent Assembly election he was elected from the Pyuthan-1 constituency, winning 13,096 votes.
