= Purna Kumar Sharma Limbu =

Nepali politician

Personal details
- Party: Nepali Congress

Purna Kumar Sherma Limbu (Nepali: पूर्णकुमार शेर्मा) is a Nepalese politician, belonging to the Nepali Congress. In 2005, Sherma was nominated to the Central Working Committee of the Nepali Congress.

In the 2008 Constituent Assembly election he was elected from the Panchthar-1 constituency, winning 12920 votes.
