= Dipak Bahadur K.C. =

Nepali politician (1940/1941–2026)

- दिपक बहादुर
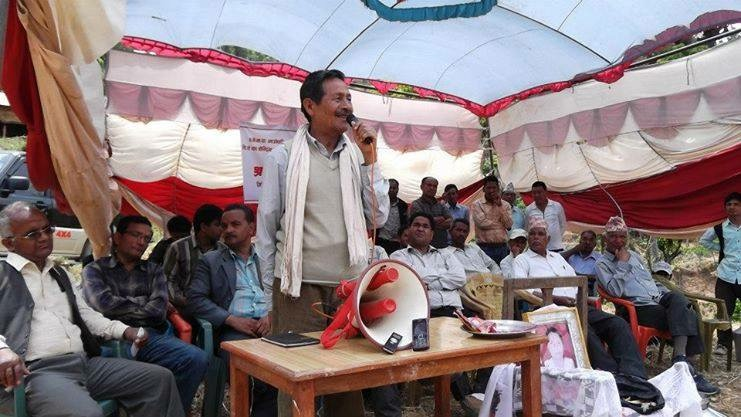
- In office 2008–2026
- Constituency: Pyuthan-2

Personal details
- Born: 1940 or 1941
- Died: 9 August 2026 (aged 85) Pyuthan, Nepal
- Party: Communist Party of Nepal (Maoist)

Dipak Bahadur K.C. (1940 or 1941 – 9 August 2026) was a Nepalese politician, belonging to the Communist Party of Nepal (Revolutionary Maoist). In the 2008 Constituent Assembly election. He was elected from the Pyuthan-2 constituency, winning 12,857 votes. Bahadur died on 9 August 2026, at the age of 85.
