= Damodar Chaudhary =

Nepali politician

Personal details
- Party: Communist Party of Nepal (Marxist-Leninist)

Damodar Chaudhary (Nepali: दामोदर चौधरी; died April 29, 2010, in Kathmandu) was a Nepalese politician from Dang Deukhuri District belonging to the Communist Party of Nepal (Marxist–Leninist). He was elected to the Constituent Assembly of Nepal in the 2007 election through the proportional representation vote. In the Constituent Assembly, he sat on the Committee for Determining the Structure of the Legislative Body as well as the Development Committee.
