= Khem Bahadur Bam =

Nepalese politician

Khem Bahadur Bum
- खेम बहादुर बम
- Incumbent
- Assumed office 2008
- Constituency: Doti-2

Personal details
- Party: Communist Party of Nepal (Maoist)

Khem Bahadur Bum (Nepali: खेम बहादुर बम) is a Nepalese politician, belonging to the Communist Party of Nepal (Maoist). In the 2008 Constituent Assembly election he was elected from the Doti-2 constituency, winning 10929 votes.
