= Dama Kumari Sharma =

Nepali politician

- दामा कुमारी शर्मा

Constituent Assembly
- Incumbent
- Assumed office 2008

Personal details
- Party: Communist Party of Nepal (Maoist)

Dama Kumari Sharma (Nepali: दामा कुमारी शर्मा) is a Nepalese politician, belonging to the Communist Party of Nepal (Maoist). In the 2008 Constituent Assembly election she was elected from the Dang-2 constituency, winning 20240 votes.
