= Rukmini Chaudhary =

Nepalese politician

Rukmini Chaudhari (Nepali: रुक्‍मिणी चौधरी) is a Nepalese politician. She was elected to the Second Constituent Assembly in the 2013 election as a Proportional Representation candidate of the Sanghiya Loktantrik Rastriya Manch (Tharuhat).
