= Arjun Rai =

Nepali politician

- अर्जुन राई
- Incumbent
- Assumed office 2008

Personal details
- Party: Rastriya Prajatantra Party

Arjun Rai (Nepali: अर्जुन राई) (b. Khalle, Khotang district) is a Nepalese politician, belong to the Rastriya Janshakti Party. He is an Alternative Central Committee of RJP. Rai has an M.A. in English. He had joined Nepali Congress in 1979, but later joined the pro-panchayat Nepal Youth Organization. He was the Khotang district chairman of the organization 1986–1989. In 1990 he joined the Rastriya Prajatantra Party. During some periods he served as Khotant district chair of the party. When RPP split in 2005, he joined the RJP. After the 2008 Constituent Assembly election he became a Constituent Assembly member.
