= Phulmati Devi Chaudhari =

Nepali politician

- फूलमती देवी चौधरी
- Incumbent
- Assumed office 2008

Personal details
- Party: Rastriya Janshakti Party

Phulmati Devi Chaudhari (Nepali: फूलमती देवी चौधरी) is a Nepalese politician, belonging to the Rastriya Janshakti Party. After the 2008 Constituent Assembly election she became a Constituent Assembly member for Kailali District, elected through the proportional representation system.
