= Communist Party of Nepal Marxist−Leninist (Samajbadi) =

Communist Party of Nepal (Marxist–Leninist–Socialist) नेपाल कम्युनिस्ट पार्टी (मार्क्सवादी–लेनिनवादी–समाजवादी)
- Founded: 6 August 2010
- Dissolved: April 2013
- Split from: CPN (Marxist–Leninist)
- Succeeded by: Communist Party of Nepal (2013)
- Ideology: Communism; Marxism–Leninism
- Political position: Left-wing

The Communist Party of Nepal Marxist−Leninist (Samajbadi) was a political party in Nepal. The party was founded on August 6, 2010, through a split in the Communist Party of Nepal (Marxist-Leninist).

== History ==
Four of the Constituent Assembly members of CPN (ML) joined the new party; Ganesh Chaudhary, Sharada Nepali, Tilak Bahadur Thapa Magar and Yadu Bansha Jha. The formation of the new party came just hours before the crucial 4th vote on election of Prime Minister. CPN-ML (Samajbadi) declared its support for Maoist chairman Pushpa Kamal Dahal in the election.

A 17-member Central Executive Committee of the new party was formed (including all four of the Constituent Assembly members). Jagat Bahadur Bogati was the chairman of the party, Yadu Bansha Jha its secretary and Tilak Bahadur Thapa Magar was the treasurer as well as chief whip of the party.

On 26 April 2011, the party was registered with the Election Commission of Nepal, and was allocated the election symbol hammer and spade.

In April 2013, the party merged into the Communist Party of Nepal.

== See also ==
- List of communist parties in Nepal
