= Hari Roka =

Nepali politician

- हरि रोका
- Incumbent
- Assumed office 2008
- Constituency: nominated

Personal details
- Party: Communist Party of Nepal (Maoist)

Hari Roka (Nepali: हरि रोका) is a Nepalese politician. At the age of 13, he was sentenced to seven years imprisonment for having taken part in a demonstration and took HSC at 13.

He has studied at Ph.D-level (yet to be completed) at Jawaharlal Nehru University, India. In 2007 he was nominated to the interim parliament. In July 2008 he became a nominated member of the Constituent Assembly on behalf of Communist Party of Nepal (Maoist).
