= Shankar Bahadur Khadka =

Nepali politician

Personal details
- Party: Communist Party of Nepal (Maoist)

Shankar Bahadur Khadka (Nepali: शंकर बहादुर खड्का) is a Nepalese politician, belonging to the Communist Party of Nepal. In the 2008 Constituent Assembly election he was elected from the Bajhang-2 constituency, winning 13895 votes.
