= Salma Khatoon Mikrani =

Nepalese politician

Salma Khatoon Mikrani सलमा खातुन मिकरानी
- In office 2008–2013

CA Membere

Personal details
- Born: 25 January 1976 (age 50) Kadarbana village of Rajdevi vdc, Rautahat District, Nepal
- Party: Nepal Socialist Party
- Other political affiliations: Madhesi Jana Adhikar Forum, Nepal (Before 2011); Madhesi Janaadhikar Forum, Republican; Terai Madhesh Loktantrik Party

Salma Khatoon Mikrani (Nepali: सलमा खातुन मिकरानी) is a Nepalese politician. She was a Proportional Representative member of the first Constituent Assembly of Nepal in 2008, representing the Madhesi Jana Adhikar Forum, Nepal party. The party later split into two, and she joined the Jaya Prakash Gupta group, who launched a new political party under the name Madhesi Janaadhikar Forum, Republican in May 2011.

Before the second Constituent Assembly election of 2013, she left the Madhesi Janaadhikar Forum, Republican, and joined the Tarai-Madhesh Loktantrik Party in a programme held by chairman Mahanth Thakur in Janakpur in August 2013. She was the only representative of the Mikrani community in the Nepalese parliament.

== Early life ==
She was born on 25 January 1976 at Kattarban village, Rajdevi vdc, Rautahat District. Her father was Mohammad Shamsul Haque Mikrani, and her mother Jamila Begum Mikrani. She is married to Mohammad Azaz Mikrani, from vdc Bhadsar, Sarlahi, and lives with him in Bharsar-6, Sarlahi. She actively participated in the Madheshee Movement or Masdhesh agitation in 2006 and 2007, and because of her bravery, sincerity, patience and courage, the party gave her the opportunity to be the proportional representative of Sarlahi districts.

== Passport scam ==
The Commission for the Investigation of Abuse of Authority (CIAA) of Nepal has investigated cases of the sale of Red (diplomatic) passports by distinguished Constituent Assembly members representing Madhesi Janadhikar Forum. She has been implicated in this affair, along with Shiva Pujan Rai Yadav and Rambha Devi.
