= Sebaki Devi Das Tatma =

Nepali politician

Sebaki Devi Das Tatma (Nepali: सबकी देवी दास तात्मा) is a Nepalese politician, belonging to the Madhesi Janadhikar Forum. During her party's campaigns for Madhesi autonomy, Tatma took parts in rallies of the movement. Following the 2008 Constituent Assembly election, she was selected by MJF from the Proportional Representation quota to represent the party in the assembly. Prior to becoming a Constituent Assembly member, the 32-year-old Tatma worked as a domestic servant. She has four children.
