= Bhagat Bahadur Baduwal =

Nepalese politician

- भगत बहादुर वडुवाल
- Incumbent
- Assumed office 2008
- Constituency: Kailali-2
- Majority: 21219

Personal details
- Party: Pragatisheel Loktantrik Party (2025-present)
- Other political affiliations: Communist Party of Nepal (Maoist)

Bhagat Bahadur Baduwal is a Nepalese politician, belonging to the Progressive Campaign, Nepal. In the 2008 Constituent Assembly election he was elected from the Kailali-2 constituency, winning 21219 votes.
