= Ram Bachhan Ahir (Yadhav) =

Nepalese politician

- राम बच्चन अहिर (यादव)
- Incumbent
- Assumed office 2008

Personal details
- Born: Bharat Pokhari Vdc-9 Jamunabot Kaski.
- Party: Madhesi Janadhikar Forum

Ram Bachhan Ahir (Yadhav) is a Nepalese politician, belonging to the Madhesi Janadhikar Forum. In the 2008 Constituent Assembly election he was elected from the Nawalparasi-5 constituency, winning 13641 votes.
