= Jhakku Prasad Subedi =

Nepali politician

- झक्कु प्रसाद सुवेदी
- Incumbent
- Assumed office 2008
- Constituency: Kathmandu-2

Personal details
- Party: Communist Party of Nepal (Maoist)

Jhakku Prasad Subedi (Nepali: झक्कु प्रसाद सुवेदी) is a Nepalese politician, belonging to the Communist Party of Nepal (Maoist). He is a teacher by profession.

In February 1996 Subedi, then the Chairman of the Rolpa District Development Committee, was arrested. He was released on March 26, 1998. According to Amnesty International report, Subedi had been tortured whilst in captivity.

In November 2001 Subedi became a member of the United Revolutionary People's Council, the pre-governmental structure instituted by the Maoists.

On April 12, 2008, he won the Kathmandu-2 seat in the Constituent Assembly election, defeating the CPN(UML) general secretary Madhav Kumar Nepal.

Subedi is the Newa State Committee of the All Nepal Communications, Printing and Publication Workers Union.
