= Ghan Shyam Yadav Ahir =

Nepali politician

Ghan Shyam Yadav Ahir (Nepali: घनश्याम यादव) is a Nepalese politician, belonging to the Communist Party of Nepal (Maoist). Yadav is the Rupandehi District Secretary of CPN(Maoist). In the 2008 Constituent Assembly election he was elected from the Rupandehi-1 constituency, winning 12624 votes.
