= Lekh Raj Bhatta =

Nepali politician

Lekhraj Bhatta
- लेखराज भट्ट
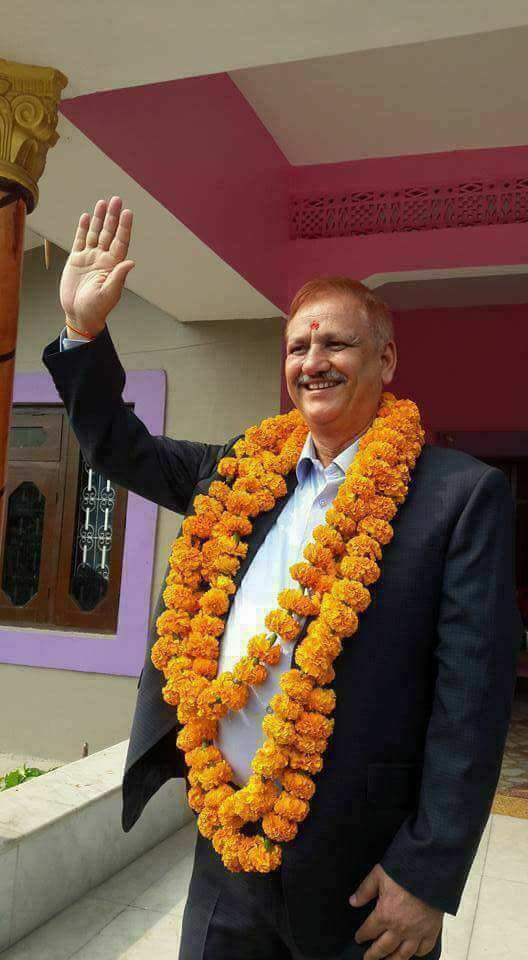

Secretary of CPN (UML)
- Incumbent
- Assumed office 30 November 2021

Minister of Industry, Commerce and Supplies
- In office 20 November 2019 – 20 May 2021
- President: Bidhya Devi Bhandari
- Prime Minister: KP Oli
- Preceded by: Matrika Yadav
- Succeeded by: Dilendra Prasad Badu

Minister for Labour and Transport
- In office 2008–2009
- President: Ram Baran Yadav
- Prime Minister: Pushpa Kamal Dahal

Member of House of Representatives
- In office 2017–2021
- Constituency: Kailali-4

Member of Constituent Assembly of Nepal
- In office 2008–2013
- Constituency: Kailali-5
- In office 2013–2017
- Constituency: Kailali-5

Personal details
- Born: 24 March 1960 (age 66) Doti District, Nepal
- Party: CPN (UML) (2021-present)
- Other political affiliations: CPN (Maoist Centre) (1994-2021)

Lekh Raj Bhatta (Nepali: लेखराज भट्ट; born 24 March 1960) is a Nepalese politician, belonging to the CPN (UML). Bhatta is a former member of Constituent Assembly and the secretary of CPN (UML).

== Political life ==
He also served as Minister for Labour and Transport in the First Dahal cabinet and Minister of Industry, Commerce and Supplies in the Second Oli cabinet. In the 2008 Constituent Assembly election, he was elected from the Kailali-5 constituency, winning 17979 votes. Again he served as Member of Constituent Assembly in 2013 from Kailali-5. He was the former Member of House of Representatives elected from Kailali-5.

== Personal life ==
He was born on 24 March 1960 to Durga Devi and Dasharath Bhatt.

== Political career ==
Bhatta joined politics in 1973 and took the membership of Nepal Communist Party (Fourth Convention) led by Mohan Bikram Singh in 1976. He later joined CPN (Masaal) and CPN (Unity Center) to finally become a full-time member of CPN-Maoist in 1995. He went on to become a central member in 2001 and politburo member. He was jailed for six months during the armed conflict launched by CPN-Maoist.

In the CA Election 2008, Bhatta was elected from Kailali-5 with 17,979 votes. His closest opponent Dirgha Raj Bhatta (NC) received 13,638 votes while Hari Shankar Yogi (CPN-UML) got 7,597 votes to come in third.

Bhatta was appointed as Labor Minister in the government led by Pushpa Kamal Dahal 'Prachanda'. He looked after the Ministry for Commerce and Supplies in the government led by Dr. Baburam Bhattarai. He is the standing committee member of Nepal Communist Party.

== See also ==
- 2021 split in Communist Party of Nepal (Maoist Centre)
