= Post Bahadur Bogati =

Nepalese politician

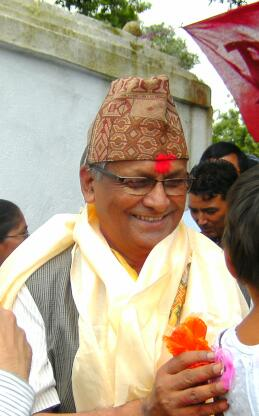

Personal details
- Born: 18 July 1953 Tupche–2, Nuwakot
- Died: 15 September 2014 (aged 61) Norvic International Hospital, Kathmandu, Nepal
- Party: Unified Communist Party of Nepal (Maoist)

Post Bahadur Bogati (18 July 1953 – 15 September 2014) represented Unified Communist Party of Nepal (Maoist) in the CA Election-2008. He was assigned as the General Secretary from the 7th convention of UCPN- Maoist, held in Hetauda. He was the Minister for Information and Communications as well as Minister for Culture, Tourism and Civil Aviation. He was also the vice-chairman of UCPN (Maoist).

Bogati died on 15 September 2014 due to cardiac arrest followed by brain hemorrhage in Norvic International Hospital, Kathmandu, Nepal.
