= Damber Dhoj Tumbahamphe =

Nepali politician

Personal details
- Party: CPN (UML)

Damber Dhoj Tumbahamphe (Nepali: डम्बरध्वज तुम्बाहाम्फे) is a Nepalese politician, belonging to the Communist Party of Nepal (UML). In the 2008 Constituent Assembly election he was elected from the Taplejung-2 constituency, winning 8628 votes.
