= Dan Bahadur Kurmi =

Nepali politician

Dan Bahadur Kurmi (Chaudhary)

Personal details
- Party: Pragatisheel Loktantrik Party

Dan Bahadur Kurmi (Nepali: दान बहादुर कुर्मी) is a Nepalese politician, belonging to the Pragatisheel Loktantrik Party.

== History ==
He was elected to the Pratinidhi Sabha, the lower house of parliament, in the 1999 election from the Kapilvastu-1 constituency as a candidate of the Communist Party of Nepal (Unified Marxist-Leninist). He won by 14,494 votes, defeating the incumbent Kamlesh Kumar Sharma of the Nepali Congress.

In February 2008, Chaudhari resigned from parliament and the CPN(UML) and joined the Tarai-Madhesh Loktantrik Party.

In the 2008 Constituent Assembly election he was elected from the Kapilvastu-2 constituency, winning 8,434 votes.

== See also ==
- Nepal Socialist Party
