= Bishnu Prasad Chaudhari Tharu =

Nepali politician

- बिष्णुप्रसाद चौधरी
- Incumbent
- Assumed office 2008
- Constituency: Bardiya-2

Personal details
- Party: Communist Party of Nepal (Maoist Centre)

Bishnu Prasad Chaudhari Tharu (Nepali: बिष्णुप्रसाद चौधरी) is a Nepalese politician, belonging to the Communist Party of Nepal (Maoist Centre). In the 2008 Constituent Assembly election he was elected from the Bardiya-2 constituency, winning 17851 votes.
