= Radha Gyawali =

Nepali politician

Radha Kumari Gyawali
- राधा कुमारी ज्ञावाली

Minister of Energy
- In office 25 February 2014 – 1 October 2015
- President: Bidhya Devi Bhandari
- Prime Minister: KP Oli
- Vice President: Paramananda Jha
- Preceded by: Top Bahadur Rayamajhi

Member of Parliament, Pratinidhi Sabha for CPN (UML) party list
- In office 4 March 2018 – 18 September 2022

Member of Constituent Assembly for CPN (UML) party list
- In office 28 May 2008 – 28 May 2012

Personal details
- Born: 31 March 1954 (age 72)]
- Party: CPN (UML)

Radha Gyawali (Nepali: राधा ज्ञवाली) a member of the Communist Party of Nepal (Unified Marxist-Leninist), assumed the post of the Minister of Energy on 25 February 2014 under Sushil Koirala-led government. She also became the Energy minister under Baburam Bhattarai-led government.
