= Om Prakash Yadav Gulzari =

Nepali politician

Om Prakash Yadhav Gulzari (Nepali: ओमप्रकाश यादव) is a Nepali politician, belonging to the Madhesi Janadhikar Forum. In 2007, Yadav was accused of the murder of two regional Young Communist League leaders. In the 2008 Constituent Assembly election he was elected from the Rupandehi-2 constituency, winning 10612 votes.
