= Hari Raj Limbu =

Nepali politician

Personal details
- Party: Communist Party of Nepal (Maoist)

Hari Raj Limbu (Nepali: हरि राज लिम्बु) is a Nepalese politician, belonging to the Communist Party of Nepal. In April 2008, he won the Dhankuta-2 seat in the Constituent Assembly election.
