= Sushma Sharma Ghimire =

Nepali politician

Personal details
- Party: Communist Party of Nepal (Maoist)

Sushma Sharma Ghimire (Nepali: सुष्मा शर्मा घिमिरे) is a Nepalese politician, belonging to the Communist Party of Nepal. In the 2008 Constituent Assembly election she was elected from the Dang-5 constituency, winning 17062 votes.
