= Dhanusha 2 =

Parliamentary constituency in Nepal

- Parliamentary constituency
- Dhanusha 2 in Madhesh Province
- Province: Madhesh Province
- District: Dhanusha District

Current constituency
- Created: 1991
- Party: Rastriya Swatantra Party
- Member of Parliament: Ram Binod Yadav

Dhanusha 2 is one of four parliamentary constituencies of Dhanusha District in Nepal. This constituency came into existence on the Constituency Delimitation Commission (CDC) report submitted on 31 August 2017.

== Incorporated areas ==
Dhanusha 2 incorporates Kamala Municipality, Janaknandani Rural Municipality, Sahidnagar Municipality, Aaurahi Rural Municipality, wards 1, 2, 3, 4, 5, 6, 7 and 8 of Bideha Municipality, wards 1, 4, 6 and 9 of Hansapur Municipality and wards 17 and 18 of Janakpur Sub-metropolitan City.

== Assembly segments ==
It encompasses the following Madhesh Provincial Assembly segment

- Dhanusha 2(A)
- Dhanusha 2(B)

== Members of Parliament ==
=== Parliament/Constituent Assembly ===
Election	Member	Party
1991	Lila Koirala	Nepali Congress
1999	Yog Narayan Yadav	CPN (Unified Marxist–Leninist)
2008	Ram Chandra Jha	Nepali Congress
2013	Ram Chandra Jha	Nepali Congress
2017	Umashankar Argariya	Federal Socialist Forum, Nepal
2017	Umashankar Argariya	Samajbadi Party, Nepal
2017	Umashankar Argariya	People's Socialist Party, Nepal
2017	Umashankar Argariya	Loktantrik Samajwadi Party, Nepal
2022	Ram Krishna Yadav	Nepali Congress
2026	Ram Binod Yadav	Rastriya Swatantra Party

=== Provincial Assembly ===
==== 2(A ====
Election	Member	Party
2017	Shailendra Kumar Yadav	Federal Socialist Forum, Nepal
May 2019	Shailendra Kumar Yadav	Samajbadi Party, Nepal
April 2020	Shailendra Kumar Yadav	People's Socialist Party, Nepal

==== 2(B) ====
Election	Member	Party
2017	Ram Ashish Yadav	Federal Socialist Forum, Nepal
May 2019	Ram Ashish Yadav	Samajbadi Party, Nepal
April 2020	Ram Ashish Yadav	People's Socialist Party, Nepal

== Election results ==
=== Election in the 2020s ===
==== 2026 general election ====
Candidate	Party
Dinesh Parshaila	Nepali Congress
Umashankar Argariya	CPN (UML)
Ram Chandra Jha	Nepali Communist Party
Others	
Total

==== 2022 general election ====
Candidate	Party	Votes	%
Ram Krishna Yadav	Nepali Congress	20,112	25.90
Umashankar Argariya	CPN (UML)	19,955	25.69
Ram Chandra Jha	CPN (Unified Socialist)	13,605	17.52
Ananda Yadav	People's Socialist Party, Nepal	12,901	16.61
Jay Narayan Sah	Janamat Party	9,992	12.87
Others		1,100	1.42
Total		77,665	100.00
Majority		157	
Nepali Congress gain			

=== Election in the 2010s ===
==== 2017 legislative elections ====
Party	Candidate	Votes
Federal Socialist Forum, Nepal	Umashankar Argariya	32,044
CPN (Maoist Centre)	Ram Chandra Jha	18,715
Nepali Congress	Ram Krishna Yadav	15,442
Others		1,822
Invalid votes		3,648
Result	FSFN gain	
Source: Election Commission

==== 2017 Nepalese provincial elections ====
===== 2(A) =====
Party	Candidate	Votes
Federal Socialist Forum, Nepal	Shailendra Kumar Yadav	16,523
Communist Party of Nepal (Maoist Centre)	Nawal Kishore Sah	9,085
Nepali Congress	Rajeshwar Goit	7,386
Others		693
Invalid votes		1,503
Result	FSFN gain	
Source: Election Commission

===== 2(B) =====
Party	Candidate	Votes
Federal Socialist Forum, Nepal	Ram Ashish Yadav	17,132
CPN (Unified Marxist–Leninist)	Ram Chandra Mandal	9,489
Nepali Congress	Rajdev Yadav	7,164
Others		847
Invalid votes		1,391
Result	FSFN gain	
Source: Election Commission

==== 2013 Constituent Assembly election ====
Party	Candidate	Votes
Nepali Congress	Ram Krishna Yadav	9,378
UCPN (Maoist)	Ram Chandra Mandal	7,144
CPN (Unified Marxist–Leninist)	Bhol Prasad Sah	5,365
Madhesh Samata Party Nepal	Nirgun Sahani	1,963
Madhesi Jana Adhikar Forum, Nepal (Democratic)	Sahitya Nanda Yadav	1,381
Terai Madhes Loktantrik Party	Parmeshwar Sah Sudi	1,329
Others		6,473
Result	Congress hold	
Source: NepalNews

=== Election in the 2000s ===
==== 2008 Constituent Assembly election ====
Party	Candidate	Votes
Nepali Congress	Ram Krishna Yadav	9,825
CPN (Maoist)	Ram Chandra Mandal	8,219
CPN (Unified Marxist–Leninist)	Ratneshwar Goit Yadav	6,518
Terai Madhes Loktantrik Party	Parmeshwar Sah Sudi	4,490
Madhesi Jana Adhikar Forum, Nepal	Pawan Kumar Jha	3,439
Others		3,466
Invalid votes		2,794
Result	Congress gain	
Source: Election Commission

=== Election in the 1990s ===
==== 1999 legislative elections ====
Party	Candidate	Votes
CPN (Unified Marxist–Leninist)	Yog Narayan Yadav	16,736
Nepali Congress	Lila Koirala	15,843
Independent	Asarfi Sah	13,204
CPN (Marxist–Leninist)	Ram Singh Yadav	1,730
Others		2,182
Invalid Votes		1,702
Result	CPN (UML) gain	
Source: Election Commission

==== 1994 legislative elections ====
Party	Candidate	Votes
Nepali Congress	Lila Koirala	17,147
CPN (Unified Marxist–Leninist)	Yog Narayan Yadav	14,056
Rastriya Prajatantra Party	Hem Bahadur Malla	10,431
Others		2,409
Result	Congress hold	
Source: Election Commission

==== 1991 legislative elections ====
Party	Candidate	Votes
Nepali Congress	Lila Koirala	19,644
CPN (Unified Marxist–Leninist)	Ram Chandra Jha	8,791
Result	Congress gain	

== See also ==
- List of parliamentary constituencies of Nepal
