= First Oli cabinet =

Government of Nepal from 2015 to 2016

First Oli Cabinet
- Cabinet of Nepal
- October 2015–August 2016
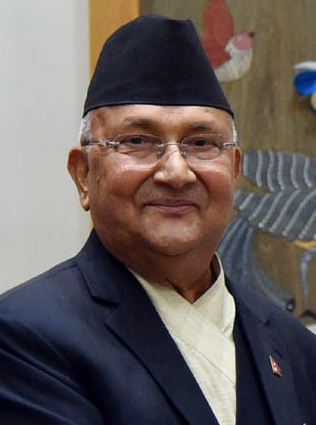
- Date formed: 12 October 2015
- Date dissolved: 4 August 2016

People and organisations
- President: Ram Baran Yadav (until 29 October 2015); Bidhya Devi Bhandari (from 29 October 2015)
- Prime Minister: Khadga Prasad Oli
- Deputy Prime Minister: Bijay Kumar Gachhadar; Top Bahadur Rayamajhi; Kamal Thapa; Chitra Bahadur K.C.; Chandra Prakash Mainali; Bhim Bahadur Rawal
- Total no. of members: 42 appointments
- Member party: CPN (UML); CPN (Maoist Centre); RPP-N; MFJN (Loktantrik); RPP; CPN (ML); Rastriya Janamorcha; Janamukti (Democratic); Nepal Pariwar Dal; Madhesh Samata; Samajbadi Janata

History
- Election: 2013
- Legislature term: 2015–2017
- Predecessor: Sushil Koirala cabinet
- Successor: Second Dahal cabinet

The First K. P. Sharma Oli cabinet was formed on 12 October 2015, following the declaration of the Nepalese Constitution, and after Sushil Koirala stepped down as the Prime Minister of Nepal. Khadga Prasad Oli was elected as the new prime minister of Nepal. Oli's candidacy was supported by the Unified Communist Party of Nepal (Maoist), Rastriya Prajatantra Party Nepal, and several smaller parties represented in the Nepalese Parliament. After being sworn in, Khadga Prasad Oli formed a new government in a coalition with the parties that supported his election.

The cabinet was expanded three times on 5 and 9 November 2015 and on 1 January 2016. The CPN (Maoist Centre) withdrew from the government on 13 July 2016.

== Cabinet ==
Portfolio	Minister	Party	Took office	Left office
Prime Minister of Nepal	K. P. Sharma Oli	CPN (UML)	12 October 2015	4 August 2016
Deputy Prime Minister; Minister for Physical Planning and Transport	Bijay Kumar Gachhadar	MJFN (Loktantrik)	12 October 2015	4 August 2016
Deputy Prime Minister; Minister for Foreign Affairs	Kamal Thapa	RPP-Nepal	12 October 2015	4 August 2016
Minister for Federal Affairs and Local Development	Kamal Thapa	RPP-Nepal	9 November 2015	4 August 2016
Deputy Prime Minister; Minister for Defence	Bhim Bahadur Rawal	CPN (UML)	5 November 2015	4 August 2016
Deputy Prime Minister; Minister for Women, Children and Social Welfare	Chandra Prakash Mainali	CPN (ML)	5 November 2015	4 August 2016
Deputy Prime Minister; Minister for Cooperatives and Poverty Alleviation	Chitra Bahadur K.C.	Janamorcha	5 November 2015	4 August 2016
Deputy Prime Minister; Minister for Energy	Top Bahadur Rayamajhi	Maoist Centre	12 October 2015	13 July 2016
Minister for Finance	Bishnu Prasad Paudel	CPN (UML)	5 November 2015	4 August 2016
Minister for Drinking Water and Sanitation	Prem Bahadur Singh	Samajbadi Janata Party	24 December 2015	20 July 2016
Minister for Labour and Employment	Deepak Bohara	RPP	24 December 2015	4 August 2016
Minister for Education	Giriraj Mani Pokharel	Maoist Centre	12 October 2015	13 July 2016
Minister for Forests and Soil Conservation	Agni Sapkota	Maoist Centre	12 October 2015	13 July 2016
Minister for Home Affairs	Shakti Bahadur Basnet	Maoist Centre	12 October 2015	13 July 2016
Minister for Peace and Reconstruction	Ek Nath Dhakal	Nepal Pariwar Dal	24 December 2015	4 August 2016
Minister for Youth and Sports	Satya Narayan Mandal (Note: Appointed on 12 October 2015 without portfolio)	CPN (UML)	5 November 2015	4 August 2016
Minister for Law, Justice and Parliamentary Affairs	Agni Kharel	CPN (UML)	12 October 2015	4 August 2016
Minister for Industry	Som Prasad Pandey	CPN (UML)	12 October 2015	4 August 2016
Minister for Agriculture Development	Haribol Gajurel	Maoist Centre	12 October 2015	13 July 2016
Minister for Land Reform and Management	Ram Kumar Subba	RPP-Nepal	5 November 2015	4 August 2016
Minister for Health	Ram Janam Chaudhary	MJFN (Loktantrik)	5 November 2015	4 August 2016
Minister for Communication and Information Technology	Sher Dhan Rai	CPN (UML)	5 November 2015	4 August 2016
Minister for Livestock Development	Shanta Manawi (Note: Appointed on 5 November 2015 without portfolio)	CPN (UML)	24 December 2015	4 August 2016
Minister of General Administration	Rekha Sharma	Maoist Centre	12 October 2015	13 July 2016
Minister of Supplies	Ganesh Man Pun	Maoist Centre	12 October 2015	13 July 2016
Minister of Irrigation	Umesh Kumar Yadav	CPN (UML)	12 October 2015	4 August 2016
Minister for Culture, Tourism and Civil Aviation	Ananda Prasad Pokharel	CPN (UML)	5 November 2015	4 August 2016
Minister for Environment and Population	Biswendra Paswan	Bahujan Shakti	5 November 2015	4 August 2016
Minister for Science and Technology	Shiva Lal Thapa	Janamukti (Democratic)	24 December 2015	4 August 2016
Minister for Commerce	Jayanta Chand	RPP	17 April 2016	4 August 2016
Ministers of State
Minister of State for Industry	Meghraj Nepali	Madhesh Samata	5 November 2015	4 August 2016
Minister of State for Health	Mohammad Mustaq Alam	MJFN (Loktantrik)	5 November 2015	4 August 2016
Minister of State for Land Reform and Management	Bikram Bahadur Thapa	RPP-Nepal	9 November 2015	4 August 2016
Minister of State for Federal Affairs and Local Development	Kunti Kumari Shahi	RPP-Nepal	9 November 2015	4 August 2016
Minister of State for Drinking Water and Sanitation	Dinesh Chandra Yadav	CPN (UML)	1 January 2016	4 August 2016
Minister of State for Finance	Damodar Bhandari	CPN (UML)	1 January 2016	4 August 2016
Minister of State for Culture, Tourism and Civil Aviation	Bal Bahadur Mahat	CPN (UML)	1 January 2016	4 August 2016
Minister of State for Livestock Development	Nardevi Pun Magar	CPN (UML)	1 January 2016	4 August 2016
Minister of State for Urban Development	Manju Kumari Chaudhary	CPN (UML)	1 January 2016	4 August 2016
Minister of State for Peace and Reconstruction	Dip Narayan Sah	CPN (UML)	1 January 2016	4 August 2016
Assistant Ministers
Assistant Minister for Land Reform and Management	Dinesh Shrestha	RPP-Nepal	9 November 2015	4 August 2016
Assistant Minister for Federal Affairs and Local Development	Biraj Bista	RPP-Nepal	9 November 2015	27 April 2016
Assistant Minister for Federal Affairs and Local Development	Resham Bahadur Lama	RPP-Nepal	27 April 2016	4 August 2016

== See also ==
- Second Oli cabinet
