= Ram Binod Yadav =

Nepalese politician

Honourable Ram Binod Yadav

Member of Parliament, Pratinidhi Sabha
- Preceded by: Ram Krishna Yadav
- Constituency: Dhanusha 2

Personal details
- Born: 11 April 1976 (age 49) Janakpur, Dhanusha District, Madhesh Province
- Party: Rastriya Swatantra Party
- Spouse: Dipmala Kumari
- Parent: Tileshwar Yadav (father)
- Occupation: Politician

Ram Binod Yadav (Nepali: राम विनोद यादव) is a Nepalese politician and currently a member of Pratinidhi Sabha from Rastriya Swatantra Party.

He joined the Rastriya Swatantra Party in 2026 and secured a party ticket to contest 2026 general election from Dhanusha 2.

In the 2026 general election, he won from Dhanusha 2 with 41,637 votes, defeating Dinesh Prasad Parshaila Yadav of the Nepali Congress and Umashankar Argariya, former minister of the CPN (Unified Marxist–Leninist)

== Early life ==
Yadav was born in Janakpur, Dhanusha District on 11 April 1976 in a Maithil Yadav family.

== Electoral performance ==
Election	Year	Constituency	Contested for	Political party	Result	Votes	% of votes
Nepal general election	2026	Dhanusha 2	Pratinidhi Sabha member	Rastriya Swatantra Party	Won	41,637	53.35%
