= Banke 2 =

Parliamentary constituency in Nepal

- Parliamentary constituency
- Banke 2 in Lumbini Province
- Province: Lumbini Province
- District: Banke District

Current constituency
- Created: 1991
- Party: Rastriya Prajatantra Party
- Member of Parliament: Mohammad Ishtiyaq Rayi (CPN (UML))

Banke 2 one of three parliamentary constituencies of Banke District in Nepal. This constituency came into existence on the Constituency Delimitation Commission (CDC) report submitted on 31 August 2017.

== Incorporated areas ==
Banke 2 incorporates Duduwa Rural Municipality, and wards 1–15 and 18–22 of Nepalgunj Sub-metropolitan City.

== Assembly segments ==
It encompasses the following Lumbini Provincial Assembly segment

- Banke 2(A)
- Banke 2(B)

== Members of Parliament ==
=== Parliament/Constituent Assembly ===
Election	Member	Party
1991	Sushil Koirala	Nepali Congress
1994	Shanti SJB Rana	Rastriya Prajatantra Party
1999	Sushil Koirala	Nepali Congress
2008	Mohammad Ishtiyaq Rayi	Madhesi Janaadhikar Forum, Nepal
2013	Dinesh Chandra Yadav	CPN (Unified Marxist–Leninist)
2017	Mohammad Ishtiyaq Rayi	Federal Socialist Forum, Nepal
May 2019	Mohammad Ishtiyaq Rayi	Samajbadi Party, Nepal
April 2020	Mohammad Ishtiyaq Rayi	People's Socialist Party, Nepal
2022	Dhawal Shamsher Rana	Rastriya Prajatantra Party
2026	Mohammad Ishtiyaq Rayi	CPN (Unified Marxist–Leninist)

=== Provincial Assembly ===
==== 2(A) ====
Election	Member	Party
2017	Bijay Kumar Yadav	Federal Socialist Forum, Nepal
May 2019	Bijay Kumar Yadav	Samajbadi Party, Nepal
April 2020	Bijay Kumar Yadav	People's Socialist Party, Nepal
2022	Bhandari Lal Ahir	People's Socialist Party, Nepal

==== 2(B) ====
Election	Member	Party
2017	Surendra Bahadur Hamal	Nepali Congress
2022	Adesh Kumar Agrawal	People's Socialist Party, Nepal

== Election results ==
=== Election in the 2020s ===
==== 2026 general election ====
Candidate	Party	Votes	%
Mohammad Ishtiyaq Rayi	Communist Party of Nepal (Unified Marxist–Leninist)	24,628	36.92
Bibek Kumar Shrestha	Rastriya Swatantra Party	18,682	28.01
Sudhanshu Koirala	Nepali Congress	17,596	26.38
Rishi Raj Devkota	Rastriya Prajatantra Party	1,723	2.58
Dipendra Bista	Nepali Communist Party	1,456	2.18
Others		2,616	3.92
Total		66,701	100.00
Majority		5,946	
CPN(UML) gain			

==== 2022 general election ====
Candidate	Party	Votes	%
Dhawal Shamsher Rana	Rastriya Prajatantra Party	29,577	47.25
Mohammad Ishtiyaq Rayi	People's Socialist Party, Nepal	23,520	37.57
Sudip Narsingh Rana	Nepali Congress	4,403	7.03
Binod Kumar Agrahari	Rastriya Swatantra Party	1,333	2.13
Irfan Ahmed Sheikh	Independent	1,289	2.06
Others		2,479	3.96
Total		62,601	100.00
Majority		6,057	
Rastriya Prajatantra Party gain			

=== Election in the 2010s ===
==== 2017 legislative elections ====
Party	Candidate	Votes
Federal Socialist Forum, Nepal	Mohammad Ishtiyaq Rayi	21,575
People's Progressive Party	Pashupati Dayal Mishra	15,951
Rastriya Prajatantra Party	Om Prakash Azad	11,622
Rastriya Janta Party Nepal	Bijay Kumar Gupta	1,497
Others		3,628
Invalid votes		4,828
Result	FSFN gain	
Source: Election Commission

==== 2017 Nepalese provincial elections ====
===== 2(A) =====
Party	Candidate	Votes
Federal Socialist Forum, Nepal	Bijay Bahadur Yadav	11,574
Nepali Congress	Niranjan Singh Sijapati	7,751
CPN (Maoist Centre)	Kamta Khatik	4,898
Janasamajbadi Party Nepal	Mehdi Hasan Kawadiya	1,099
Others		2,817
Invalid votes		2,727
Result	FSFN gain	
Source: Election Commission

===== 2(B) =====
Party	Candidate	Votes
Nepali Congress	Surendra Bahadur Hamal	9,211
Federal Socialist Forum, Nepal	Durgesh Kumar Baishya	8,432
CPN (Unified Marxist–Leninist)	Bijay Kumar Gupta	5,327
Others		3,764
Invalid votes		1,528
Result	Congress gain	
Source: Election Commission

==== 2013 Constituent Assembly election ====
Party	Candidate	Votes
CPN (Unified Marxist–Leninist)	Dinesh Chandra Yadav	12,586
Nepali Congress	Raj Kumar Kurmi	7,916
Madhesi Janaadhikar Forum, Nepal	Mohammad Ishtiyaq Rayi	7,844
UCPN (Maoist)	Parmananda Verma Kurmi	1,746
Independent	Kalim Ahmed Ansari	1,277
Rastriya Prajatantra Party Nepal	Dipendra Bahadur Singh	1,196
Others		4,143
Result	CPN (UML) gain	
Source: NepalNews

=== Election in the 2000s ===
==== 2008 Constituent Assembly election ====
Party	Candidate	Votes
Madhesi Janaadhikar Forum, Nepal	Mohammad Ishtiyaq Rayi	19,396
CPN (Unified Marxist–Leninist)	Dinesh Chandra Yadav	4,565
CPN (Maoist)	Atahar Hussein Farooqi	4,091
Nepali Congress	Kailash Nath Kashaudhan	3,568
Rastriya Prajatantra Party	Pashupati Dayal Mishra	3,065
Others		4,240
Invalid votes		2,646
Result	Forum Nepal gain	
Source: Election Commission

=== Election in the 1990s ===
==== 1999 legislative elections ====
Party	Candidate	Votes
Nepali Congress	Sushil Koirala	15,256
CPN (Marxist–Leninist)	Rizwan Ahmed Sah	6,185
Independent	Pashupati Dayal Mishra	5,218
CPN (Unified Marxist–Leninist)	Badri Prasad Koirala	4,408
Rastriya Prajatantra Party	Shanti SJB Rana	3,975
Others		1,489
Invalid votes		1,030
Result	Congress gain	
Source: Election Commission

==== 1994 legislative elections ====
Party	Candidate	Votes
Rastriya Prajatantra Party	Shanti SJB Rana	15,711
Nepali Congress	Sushil Koirala	10,222
Independent	Yuvaraj Sharma	2,887
CPN (Unified Marxist–Leninist)	Syed Makbul Sah	2,643
Independent	Dhawal SJB Rana	1,394
Others		985
Result	RPP gain	
Source: Election Commission

==== 1991 legislative elections ====
Party	Candidate	Votes
Nepali Congress	Sushil Koirala	14,409
CPN (Unified Marxist–Leninist)		5,926
Result	Congress gain	

== See also ==
- List of parliamentary constituencies of Nepal
