= Ministry of Peace and Reconstruction =

Government ministry of Nepal

- शान्ति तथा पुनर्निर्माण मन्त्रालय
- Emblem of Nepal

Agency overview
- Formed: 31 March 2007
- Headquarters: Singha Durbar, Kathmandu, Nepal
- Minister responsible: Sher Bahadur Deuba, Prime Minister of Nepal and Minister of Peace and Reconstruction
- Website: peace.gov.np

The Ministry of Peace and Reconstruction (Nepali: शान्ति तथा पुनर्निर्माण मन्त्रालय) is a Nepali ministry, tasked with ensuring peace and security. It was formed in 2007 after the Government signed the Comprehensive Peace Accord (CPA) with the Communist Party of Nepal (Maoist Centre) and is mandated to implement the CPA.

== Former Ministers of Peace and Reconstruction ==
This is a list of all ministers of Peace and Reconstruction since the Nepalese Constituent Assembly election in 2013:

	Name	Party	Assumed Office
1	Ek Nath Dhakal	Nepal Pariwar Dal	24 December 2015
2	Sita Devi Yadav	Nepali Congress	26 August 2016
3	Sher Bahadur Deuba	Nepali Congress	26 June 2017

== Dissolution ==
The Ministry of Peace and Reconstruction received no funding from the Finance Ministry in 2017. The ministry was dissolved over the following few years, with its functions taken over by the Ministry of Home Affairs.
