= Umashankar Argariya =

Nepalese politician

Uma Shankar Aragriya
- उमाशंकर अरगरिया

Minister of Culture, Tourism and Civil Aviation
- In office 4 June 2021 – 22 June 2021
- President: Bidya Devi Bhandari
- Prime Minister: KP Sharma Oli
- Preceded by: Bhanu Bhakta Dhakal
- Succeeded by: Lila Nath Shrestha

Member of Parliament, Pratinidhi Sabha
- In office 4 March 2018 – 18 September 2022
- Preceded by: Ram Krishna Yadav
- Succeeded by: Ram Krishna Yadav
- Constituency: Dhanusha 2

Personal details
- Born: 13 October 1977 (age 48) Dhanusha District
- Party: CPN (UML) (2022–present)
- Other political affiliations: LSP-N (2021-2022); PSP-N (2020–2021); Samajbadi (2019–2020); FSF-N (2017–2018); NLF (2017); MJF-N (Loktantrik) (2009–17); MJF-N (2008–2009); Nepali Congress (until 2008)
- Spouse: Nilam Devi Agrariya
- Children: 2
- Parents: Rajaram Agrariya (father); Ishwari Devi (mother)

Uma Shankar Aragriya (Nepali: उमाशंकर अरगरिया) is a Nepalese politician belonging to the CPN (UML) who served as the Minister of Culture, Tourism and Civil Aviation since 4 June 2021 but was removed from the post by Supreme Court on 22 June 2021 making his tenure of just 18 days one of the shortest till date (the shortest being that of Raj Kishor Yadav). He was also a member of the 1st Federal Parliament of Nepal after winning in 2017 Nepalese general election from Dhanusha 2 constituency. Arglariya formerly a popular leader, is thought to join Nepali Congress as his party, Loktantrik Samajwadi Party went clean swept in Dhanusha district in recent local level election.

== Political life ==
His father was an active member of Nepali Congress while Agariya also remained in Nepali Congress till 2008 when he went to Madheshi Jana Adhikar Forum, Nepal led by Upendra Yadav with the present vice-president of Nepali Congress Bijay Kumar Gachhadar. In 2009, when the party divided into factions, he came to Madheshi Janadhikar Forum (Loktantrik) led by Bijay Kumar Gachhadar. The party went through a series of mergers in 2017 to form Nepal Loktantrik Forum and finally joined Nepali Congress.

Argariya was the president of Madhesh Province committee of Nepal Loktantrik Forum. Still, he couldn't live long with Gachhadar after the merger with Nepali Congress. He joined FSF-N to contest the election from Dhanusha-2 to get profit out of the legacy of second Madhesh Movement. In 2019, Naya Shakti Party, Nepal and Federal Socialist Forum, Nepal merger to form Samajbadi Party, Nepal. He had a dispute with leadership there and he along with some other HOR members was in contact with Mahesh Basnet to break the party with 40% HOR members from the SP-N political party. An ordinance was brought for the same. Still, this plan was left unsuccessful after Rastriya Janta Party, Nepal and Samajbadi Party, Nepal merged to form Janta Samajbadi Party, Nepal.

After the merger, Argariya sided with Mahantha Thakur faction in the party at various points in time. On 4 June 2021, joined the government as Minister for Culture, Tourism and Civil Aviation. Still, he was removed by the Supreme Court of Nepal on 22 June 2021 making the tenure just 18 days which is the smallest to date in history.

In an interview with Ratopati, he said it was clear that he could even join Nepali Congress as he holds a past there. This is because of increased dissatisfaction within Janata Samajbadi Party, the consensus for the party is thought to have highly decreased among the public in Terai of Nepal. Previously, FSF-N and RJP-N unitedly had contested 2017 election with the promise that they would work to fulfil the demand of Terai. Still, none of the promises was fulfilled and now four years have passed with By-election date fixed. He said, there was no use of Madhesh Based party if they dedicate themself to same leadership against whom they had raised voice to win the election. He said he would leave Mahantha Thakur now after Nepali Congress government would be formed and join as a minister to work for the public. He also yelled that Gachhadar had proposed him to join NC government led by Deuba in 2017. He was also promised to be made member of HOR from proportional list of Nepali Congress.

== Electoral history ==
=== 2022 legislative elections ===
Candidate	Party	Votes	%
Ram Krishna Yadav	Nepali Congress	20,112	25.90
Umashankar Argariya	CPN (UML)	19,955	25.69
Ram Chandra Jha	CPN (Unified Socialist)	13,605	17.52
Ananda Yadav	People's Socialist Party, Nepal	12,901	16.61
Jay Narayan Sah	Janamat Party	9,992	12.87
Others		1,100	1.42
Total		77,665	100.00
Majority		157	
Nepali Congress gain			

=== 2017 legislative elections ===
Dhanusha 2
Party	Candidate	Votes
Federal Socialist Forum, Nepal	Umashankar Argariya	32,044
CPN (Maoist Centre)	Ram Chandra Jha	18,715
Nepali Congress	Ram Krishna Yadav	15,442
Others		1,822
Invalid votes		3,648
Result	FSFN gain	
Source: Election Commission

=== 2013 Constituent Assembly election ===
Dhanusha 1
Party	Candidate	Votes
Nepali Congress	Dinesh Prasad Parsaila Yadav	8,827
Independent	Jog Kumar Barbariya Yadav	7,946
UCPN (Maoist)	Ram Chandra Jha	5,310
CPN (Unified Marxist–Leninist)	Ratneshwor Goit Yadav	4,175
Madhesi Jana Adhikar Forum, Nepal (Democratic)	Umashankar Argariya	3,137
Madhesi Jana Adhikar Forum, Nepal	Arun Singh Mandal Dhanuk	1,327
Others		4,085
Result	Congress gain	
Source: NepalNews

== See also ==
- Dinesh Prasad Parshaila Yadav
