= Ram Krishna Yadav (Nepali politician) =

Nepalese politician

Honourable Ram Krishna Yadav MP
- राम कृष्ण यादव

Minister for Agriculture Development
- In office 26 July 2017 – 15 February 2018
- Preceded by: Gauri Shankar Chaudhary
- Succeeded by: Chakrapani Khanal

Member of Parliament, Pratinidhi Sabha
- Incumbent
- Assumed office 22 December 2022
- Preceded by: Umashankar Argariya
- Constituency: Dhanusha 2

Member of the Constituent Assembly / Legislature Parliament
- In office 28 May 2008 – 14 October 2017
- Preceded by: Jog Narayan Yadav
- Succeeded by: Umashankar Argariya
- Constituency: Dhanusha 2

Personal details
- Born: 16 May 1962 (age 64) Janakpur, Dhanusa, Nepal
- Party: Nepali Congress
- Education: Tribhuvan University

Ram Krishna Yadav (Nepali: राम कृष्ण यादव) is a Nepali politician of the Nepali Congress and was Agriculture minister in the Deuba cabinet. He is also a central committee member of the Nepali Congress and one of the rising youth politicians of the party. He has also served as member of the 1st Constituent Assembly and 2nd Constituent Assembly from Dhanusha-2. He joined Deuba cabinet on 26 July 2017 as Minister for Agriculture Development. In the 2022 Nepalese general election, he was elected as the member of the 2nd Federal Parliament of Nepal.

== Electoral history ==
=== 2022 general election ===
Candidate	Party	Votes	%
Ram Krishna Yadav	Nepali Congress	20,112	25.90
Umashankar Argariya	CPN (UML)	19,955	25.69
Ram Chandra Jha	CPN (Unified Socialist)	13,605	17.52
Ananda Yadav	People's Socialist Party, Nepal	12,901	16.61
Jay Narayan Sah	Janamat Party	9,992	12.87
Others		1,100	1.42
Total		77,665	100.00
Majority		157	
Nepali Congress gain			

=== 2017 legislative elections ===
Party	Candidate	Votes
Federal Socialist Forum, Nepal	Umashankar Argariya	32,044
CPN (Maoist Centre)	Ram Chandra Jha	18,715
Nepali Congress	Ram Krishna Yadav	15,442
Others		1,822
Invalid votes		3,648
Result	FSFN gain	
Source: Election Commission

=== 2013 Constituent Assembly election ===
Party	Candidate	Votes
Nepali Congress	Ram Krishna Yadav	9,378
UCPN (Maoist)	Ram Chandra Mandal	7,144
CPN (Unified Marxist–Leninist)	Bhol Prasad Sah	5,365
Madhesh Samata Party Nepal	Nirgun Sahani	1,963
Madhesi Jana Adhikar Forum, Nepal (Democratic)	Sahitya Nanda Yadav	1,381
Terai Madhes Loktantrik Party	Parmeshwar Sah Sudi	1,329
Others		6,473
Result	Congress hold	
Source: NepalNews

=== 2008 Constituent Assembly election ===
Party	Candidate	Votes
Nepali Congress	Ram Krishna Yadav	9,825
CPN (Maoist)	Ram Chandra Mandal	8,219
CPN (Unified Marxist–Leninist)	Ratneshwar Goit Yadav	6,518
Terai Madhes Loktantrik Party	Parmeshwar Sah Sudi	4,490
Madhesi Jana Adhikar Forum, Nepal	Pawan Kumar Jha	3,439
Others		3,466
Invalid votes		2,794
Result	Congress gain	
Source: Election Commission

== See also ==
- Bimalendra Nidhi
- Mahendra Yadav
- Dinesh Prasad Parshaila Yadav
