= Dinesh Chandra Yadav =

Dinesh Chandra Yadav may refer to:

- Dinesh Chandra Yadav (Nepali politician)
- Dinesh Chandra Yadav (Indian politician)
