= Kirat Janabadi Workers Party =

Kirat Janabadi Workers Party किरात जनवादी वर्कर्स पार्टी
- Abbreviation: KJWP
- Leader: Binod Rai
- Chairperson: Mina Khumbu-Sankemma Kirati
- Founded: 2006
- Split from: Communist Party of Nepal (Maoist Centre)
- Ideology: Kirati nationalism Kirati Autonomy

Kirat Janabadi Workers Party is a political party and rebel group in Nepal, whose goal is the establishment of an autonomous or independent state for the ethnic Kirat in eastern Nepal. Despite the group insisting their legitimacy as a political organization, some factions of the KJWP have been involved in attacks on police posts, kidnapping, property seizure, threatening of politicians and business owners, and multiple bombings.

In 2015, the Party surrendered their arms and announced the end of their armed struggle, demanding the government take care of its semi-military personnel, saying that they will carry on with their struggle ideologically, also demanding the Constituent Assembly declare Kirat an autonomous state with right to self determination.

== History ==
The Khambuwan Rashtriya Morcha was responsible for the first instance of armed violence in Nepal after the return to multi-party democracy in 1990. Active in the eastern hills, the KRM demanded an ethnic Rai homeland. Later, with the expansion of the Maoist insurgency into the east, a section of the KRM and its incipient Kirat Workers’ Party merged with the Maoists in 2003. The Kirat Janabadi Workers’ Party, broke away from the Maoists after the 2006 Comprehensive Peace Accord. The KJWP has experienced two major splits, causing it to split into at least three factions. The first took place in 2009 and divided the group in half, when one faction aligned itself with Rabin Kirati and another remaining loyal to Binod Rai. The second seems to have taken place in 2012, when Ananta Kranti, brother of Binod Rai, broke away and set up the Samyukta Jatiya Mukti Morcha.
