= Rastriya Jana Bikas Party =

Rastriya Jana Bikas Party राष्ट्रिय जन विकास पार्टी
- President: Gulab Mikrani
- Headquarters: Birgunj

Rastriya Jana Bikas Party (Nepali: राष्ट्रिय जन विकास पार्टी, translation: National People Development Party) is a political party in Nepal registered on 24 July 2013 with the Election Commission of Nepal ahead of the 2013 Nepalese Constituent Assembly election, with the support of 10,000 voters. Gulab Mikrani is the president of Rastriya Jana Bikas Party and its party office is located at Birgunj-18 Parsa. Table is the election symbol of this party. The party stayed at 98th position among 122 parties which participated in the Constituent Assembly election 2013. There is no any representative from this party in constituent assembly. This party's chairman Gulab Mikrani has signed a merger paper with Nepal Sanghiya Samajbadi party of Rizwan Ansari on October 10, 2017, before the parliamentary election. Gulab Mikrani was contested a poll for candidate of provincial parliamentary election 2017 from Sarlahi District 2(Kha) constituency number of the province 2. And He remains at 4th position following a moist center candidate.
