= Mohammad Ishtiyaq Rayi =

Nepali politician (born 1979)

- मोहम्मद इश्तियाक राई

General secretary of People's Socialist Party
- In office 5 May 2024 – 2025
- Preceded by: Position established

Minister for Physical Infrastructure and Transportation
- In office 4 July 2022 – 14 October 2022
- President: Bidya Devi Bhandari
- Prime Minister: Sher Bahadur Deuba
- Preceded by: Renu Kumari Yadav

Minister of Urban Development
- In office 1 June 2018 – 24 December 2019
- President: Bidya Devi Bhandari
- Prime Minister: K. P. Sharma Oli
- Preceded by: K. P. Sharma Oli (as Prime Minister)
- Succeeded by: Gokul Prasad Baskota

Member of Parliament, Pratinidhi Sabha
- Incumbent
- Assumed office 26 March 2026
- Preceded by: Dhawal Shamsher Rana
- Constituency: Banke 2
- In office 4 March 2018 – 18 September 2022
- Preceded by: Dinesh Chandra Yadav (as Member of the Constituent Assembly)
- Succeeded by: Dhawal Shamsher Rana
- Constituency: Banke 2

Member of the Constituent Assembly
- In office 28 May 2008 – 28 May 2012
- Preceded by: Sushil Koirala (as Member of Parliament)
- Succeeded by: Dinesh Chandra Yadav
- Constituency: Banke 2

Personal details
- Born: 2 November 1979 (age 46)
- Party: CPN–UML
- Other political affiliations: Rastriya Prajatantra Party; Madheshi Jana Adhikar Forum, Nepal; Federal Socialist Forum, Nepal (until 2020); People's Socialist Party

Mohammad Ishtiyaq Rayi (Nepali: मोहम्मद इश्तियाक राई) (born 2 November 1979) is a Nepali politician who had served as the Minister for Physical Infrastructure and Transportation in the ruling coalition government led by Prime Minister and Nepali Congress President Sher Bahadur Deuba.

Rai was elected as a Member of Parliament in the Pratinidhi Sabha from the Banke 2 (constituency) in the 2017 General Elections. In the 2008 Constituent Assembly election he was elected from the Banke-2 constituency, winning 19396 votes.

== See also ==
- People's Socialist Party
