= Om Sena Nepal =

Om Sena Nepal ॐ सेना नेपाल
- Chairman: Dhan Bahadur Kunwar
- Secretary-General: Govind Karki
- Headquarters: Sorhakhutte, Kathmandu

Election symbol

Om Sena Nepal (Nepali: ॐ सेना नेपाल) is a political party in Nepal. As of 2013, the general secretary of the party was Govind Karki and the chairman was Dhan Bahadur Kunwar.

The party registered itself with the Election Commission of Nepal ahead of the 2013 Constituent Assembly election, with the support of 10,000 voters. It presented two candidates in FPTP constituencies, Jay Narayan Prasad Sah in Rautahat 2 and Hom Bahadur Rakal in Bara 6. For the Proportional Representation vote the party submitted a list of 39 candidates, headed by Dhan Bahadur Kunwar. The election symbol of the party is a mouse.
