= Nepal Labour Party =

Nepal Labour Party नेपाल लेबर पार्टी
- Chairman: Nawal Kishor Sah
- Headquarters: Perishdanda Koteswor

Nepal Labour Party (Nepali: नेपाल लेबर पार्टी) is a political party in Nepal. As of 2013, the chairman of the party was Nawal Kishor Sah. The party registered itself with the Election Commission of Nepal ahead of the 2013 Constituent Assembly election, with the support of 10,000 voters. It presented 26 candidates in FPTP constituencies. For the Proportional Representation vote the party submitted a list of 59 candidates, headed by Nawal Kishor Sah. The election symbol of the party is a whistle.
