= Communist Party of Nepal (Marxist–Leninist–Maoist) Samyabadi =

- Chairman: Pundari Prasad Belbase
- Headquarters: Triporeshwor, Kathmandu
- Ideology: Communism; Marxism-Leninism-Maoism

Election symbol

Communist Party of Nepal (Marxist–Leninist–Maoist) Samyabadi (Nepali: नेपाल कम्युनिष्ट पार्टी (मालेमा) साम्यवादी) is a political party in Nepal. As of 2013, the chairman of the party was Pundari Prasad Belbase. The party proposes reorganizing Nepal into ten states.

The party registered itself with the Election Commission of Nepal ahead of the 2013 Constituent Assembly election, with the support of 10,000 voters. It presented three candidates in FPTP constituencies, Tek Bahadur Sarki in Okhladunga-1, Yubaraj Sharma Neupane in Kapilvastu-1 and Man Bahadur Sunar in Rukum-1. For the Proportional Representation vote the party submitted a list of 46 candidates, headed by Pundari Prasad Belbase. The election symbol of the party is an axe.
