= Smriti Narayan Chaudhary =

Nepalese politician

Honourable Smriti Narayan Chaudhary
- स्मृति नारायण चौधरी
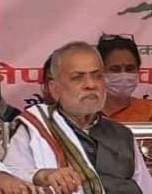

Member of Parliament, Pratinidhi Sabha for Nepali Congress party list
- Incumbent
- Assumed office 4 March 2018

Member of Parliament, Pratinidhi Sabha
- In office May 1999 – May 2002
- Preceded by: Ram Chandra Jha
- Succeeded by: Ram Chandra Jha
- Constituency: Dhanusha 1

Personal details
- Born: 27 July 1950 (age 75) Janakpur, Dhanusha District
- Party: Nepali Congress

Smriti Narayan Chaudhary is a Nepalese politician and a member of the Provincial Assembly of Province No. 2. He was elected to the Pratinidhi Sabha in the 1999 election as a candidate of the Nepali Congress under the first-past-the-post voting system. He was later elected to the Pratinidhi Sabha from the proportional representation list of the party. He is a leader close to the NC Vice-president and former deputy prime minister Bimalendra Nidhi. Chaudhary and Nidhi both come from the same district and municipality.

== Electoral history ==
=== 1999 legislative elections ===
Dhanusha-1
Party	Candidate	Votes
Nepali Congress	Smriti Narayan Chaudhary	20,095
CPN (Unified Marxist–Leninist)	Ram Chandra Jha	18,352
CPN (Marxist–Leninist)	Ratneshwor Goit	7,228
Rastriya Prajatantra Party	Guru Sharan Rohita	1,035
Others		1,377
Invalid Votes		1,457
Result	Congress gain	
Source: Election Commission
