= Ek Nath Dhakal =

Member of the Nepalese Constituent Assembly

Ek Nath Dhakal (Nepali: एकनाथ ढकाल) (born 13 August 1974) is a Nepalese politician from Nepal Family Party (Nepal Pariwar Dal) and elected parliament member from Gorkha District of Nepal, and founder of the Nepal Pariwar Dal, and served as Minister for the Ministry of Peace and Reconstruction of the Government of Nepal. Dhakal's candidacy was supported by CPN - UML. He serves as the Asia Pacific Regional Chair of the "International Association of Parliamentarians for Peace (IAPP). Dhakal serves at the Nepal-US Parliamentary Friendship Group. In April 2025, Dhakal was named as the Inaugural Secretary General of the Inter-Parliamentary Speakers’ Conference (ISC), an inter-parliamentary, intergovernmental, multilateral organization that promotes parliamentary diplomacy. In June 2025, Dhakal met Pope Leo XIV during IPU’s Parliamentary Conference on Interfaith Dialogue in Italy.

== Early life and education ==
Dhakal was born in 1974 in the Gorkha District. He received his formal education from the Tribhuvan University in Kathmandu, where he studied political science for two years followed by three years of study in sociology and anthropology. His public life started as an independent student leader and social activist carrying out humanitarian service project. He has received honors from both Nepal and abroad including the “Youth of the Year” award with gold medal in 2007. He is married to Mrs. Blessie Gadon Dhakal who is from Philippines. On 25 May 2024; Ek Nath Dhakal received his “Master of Arts in Peace Studies” from HJ International, New York, USA.

== Political career ==
In the 2008 Constituent Assembly election, the Nepal Pariwar Dal won one seat through the Proportional Representation vote. The party selected Dhakal as its representative in the assembly.

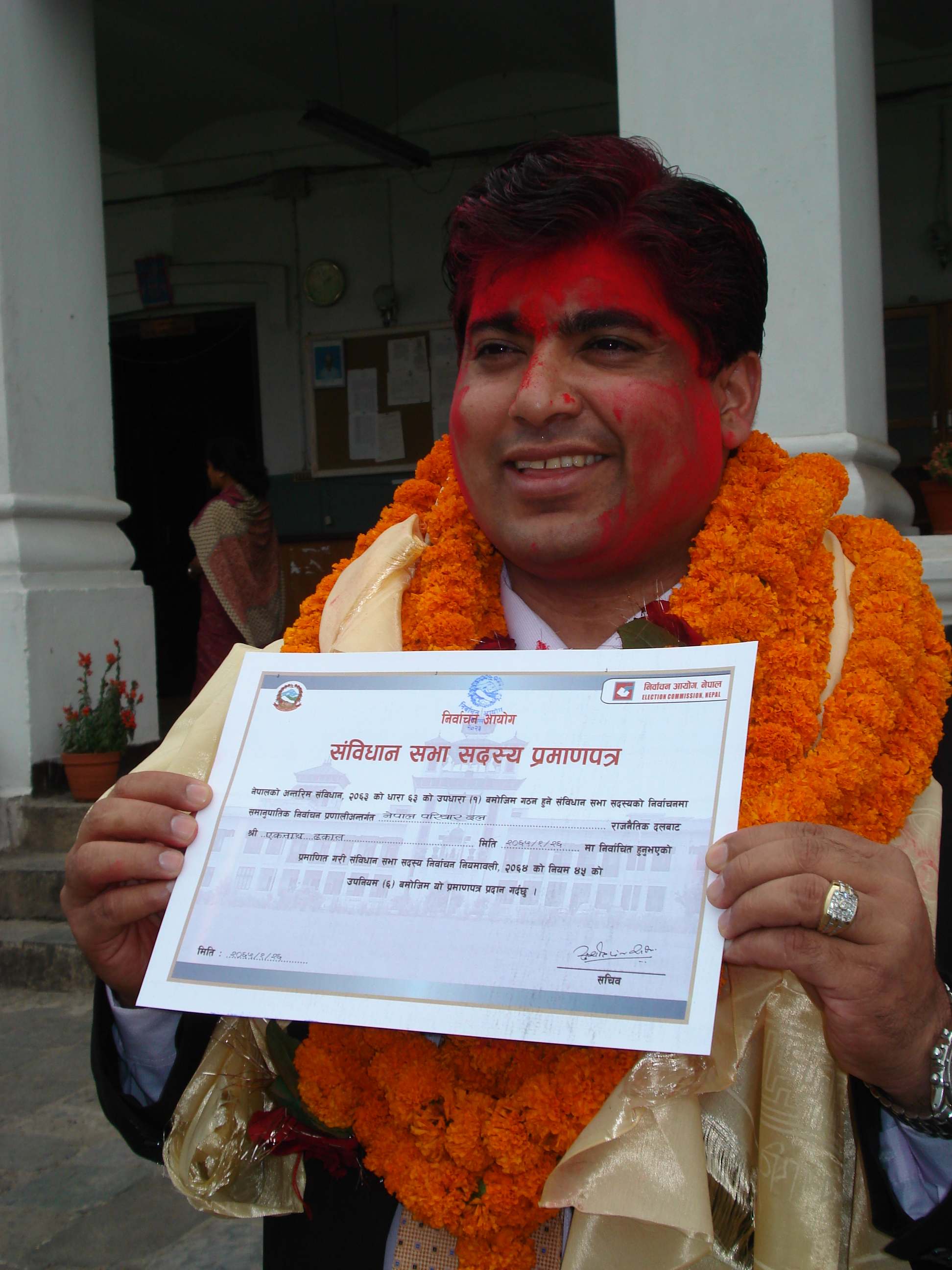
Ek Nath Dhakal holding certificate of the Member of the Constituent Assembly of Nepal after elected on 2008

Dhakal served on various parliamentary committees such as the Security Special Committee, International Relations and Human Rights Committee and Constitutional Committee during 2008–2012. Dhakal also serves as secretary general of the Youth Federation of World Peace Asia.

In 2009, Dhakal made a statement on the agenda entitled Towards Global Partnerships, at the Second Committee of the United Nations' 64th session of the General Assembly.

On October 31, 2010, the magazine Nepal Weekly published by Kantipur Publications criticized Dhakal for the arrangements surrounding Vice President Parmanand Jha's visit to South Korea on October 7, 2010. Dhakal brought Little Angels Children's Folk Ballet of Korea to Nepal to promote relations between Nepal and S Korea.

Nepali Times covered the detail story of South Korea's Unification Church is affiliated to a Nepali political party that has a minister in the cabinet and "A religious group that mixes business and politics" on it April edition of 2016 reported by Reporter Seulki Lee.

Dhakal serves in the Constitutional Committee of the Constituent Assembly and was appointed as a cabinet Minister on May 16, 2012; he is the first Minister for Ministry of Co-operatives and Poverty Alleviation (Nepal) of the Government of Nepal. Dhakal is a convener of the “South Asia Peace Initiatives” (SAPI) and is involved in Nepal's ongoing peace process. In January 2013, Dhakal told the international community that Nepalese political leaders are capable to short out the political deadlock of the country.

On January 24, 2013, Dhakal met with the Bharatiya Janata Party president Rajnath Singh in New Delhi, India. Dhakal has undertaken a poverty alleviation project in the Gorkha district, with the aim to improve conditions for the 25.2% poor people of the country.

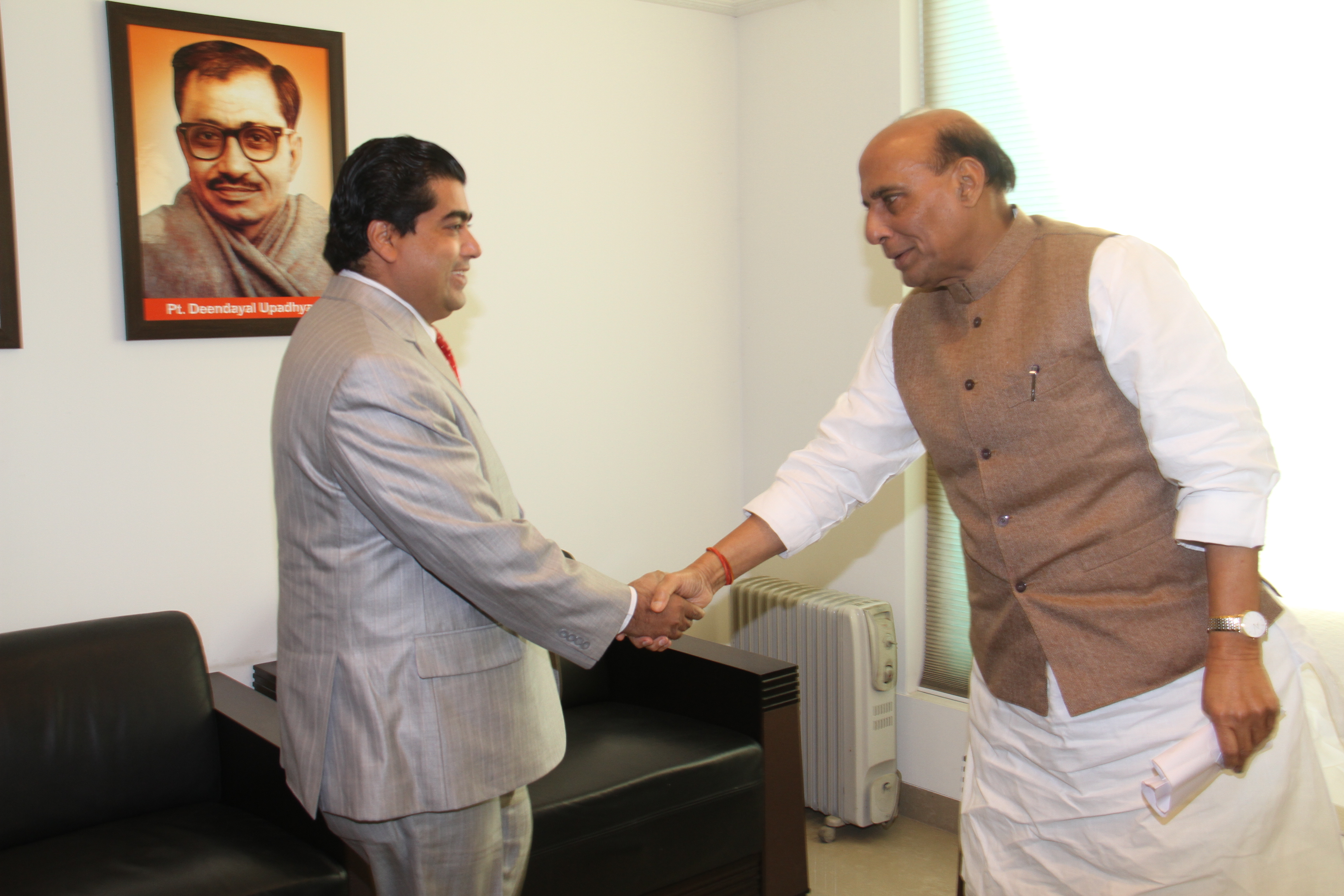
Ek Nath Dhakal meeting Bharatiya Janata Party Leader Rajnath Singh in New Delhi, India

Dhakal is a comparatively new figure in Nepalese politics and in February 2013, his name was brought out by Nepalese media as a possible candidate for prime minister, to lead Nepal's consensus government for the purpose of holding elections. Dhakal launches National Public Awareness Campaign with motto "Nation and People First" throughout the nation. Dhakal's party "Nepal Pariwar Dal" announced candidates in all 240 constituency of Nepal for the election of the Constituent Assembly scheduled on November 19, 2013. On October 9, 2013, Dhakal claimed that Nepal Pariwar Dal is fourth political power in Nepal. Dhakal wishes to develop his party as alternative democratic forces in his country.

Dhakal was re-elected in the 2013 Nepalese Constituent Assembly election for a four-year term. Dhakal serves in the most powerful parliamentary committee Public Accounts Committee. Dhakal serves as Global Vice President of Sun Moon University based in Korea. Dhakal also a Member of the Parliamentarians for Global Action based in United States of America. Dhakal advocates Universality and said at one of the religious function organized in his district Gorkha that representatives do not belong to a particular religion and ethnicity instead they represent the whole country and goodness of all faiths. Ek Nath Dhakal founded Parliamentary Peace Council (PPC Nepal) for building a culture of peace based on rule of law, democracy, service and universally shared values on November 6, 2014. The inaugural assembly was presided by Speaker of the Legislature Parliament of Nepal Subas Chandra Nemwang and lawmakers from Nepal and India were in attendance. Peace advocate Dhakal is active in promoting multidimensional peace in South Asia.

Ek Nath Dhakal is a pro traditional family values activist. He organized a "Multicultural Family Educational Peace Festival 2015" at Dasarath Rangasala Stadium in Kathmandu, Nepal on February 21, 2015 which attracted seventy thousand people. Dhakal urged India that its "unequivocal recognition" of Nepalese constitution would go a long way in reducing the current tensions and restoring cordial relations between the two countries during his meeting with Indian politicians in New Delhi on October 4, 2015. Ek Nath Dhakal is appointed as Minister for the Ministry of Peace and Reconstruction (Nepal) by Prime Minister K. P. Sharma Oli. Ek Nath Dhakal was also nominated as Chairman of the International Association of Parliamentarians for Peace (IAPP), Asia. Dhakal shared his views with Republica on Feb. 17, 2018 and asked Nepali youth to seriously consider joining politics if they do not want to be ruled by those they do not like.

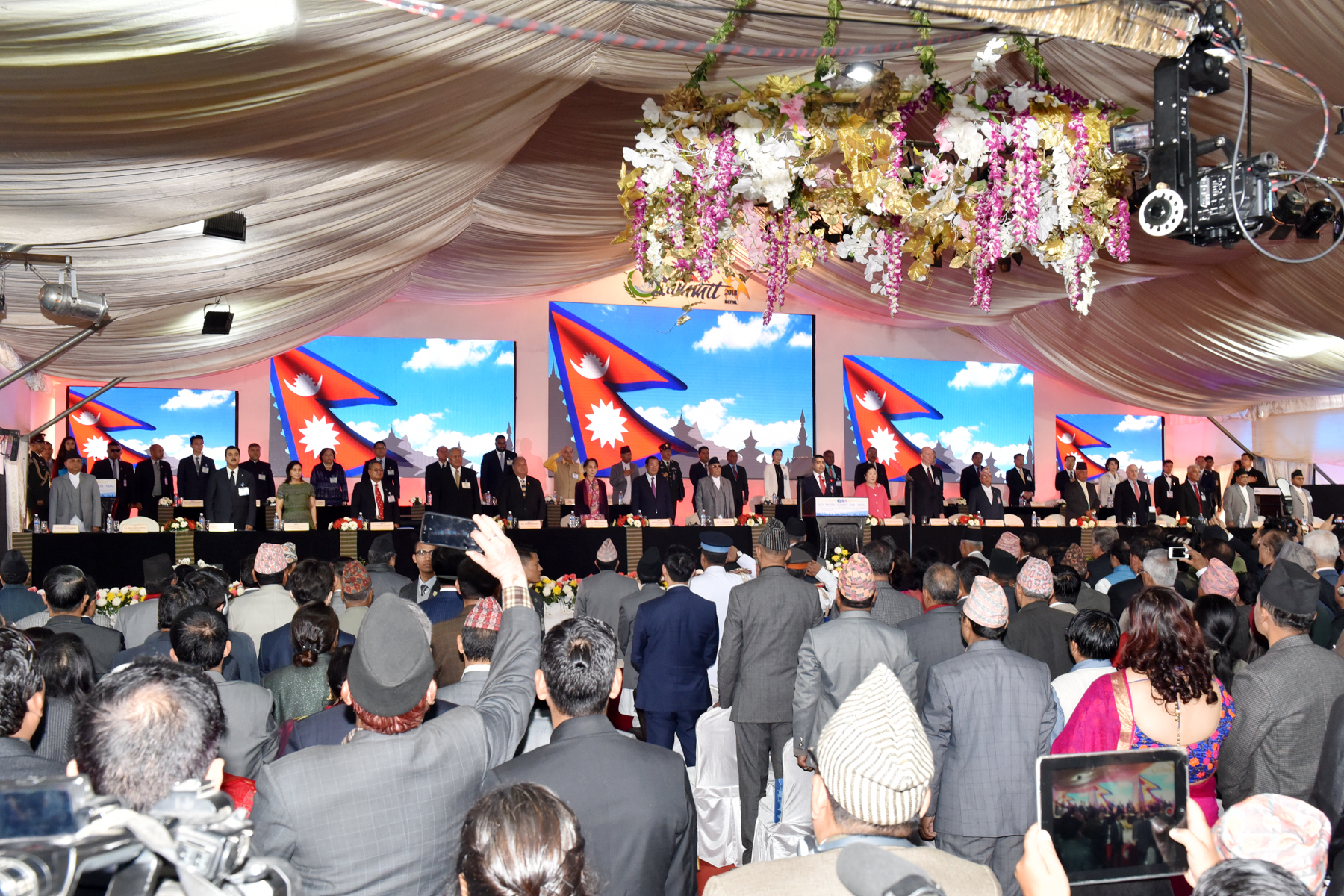
Asia Pacific Summit 2018 - Nepal

Ek Nath Dhakal was one of the key person organized Asia Pacific Summit 2018 - Nepal on November 30 to December 3, 2018 in Kathmandu, Nepal. The said summit created massive controversy in Nepal and media features the buzz of controversy more than a month, the organizer use to organize it in Nepal. The Summit was aim to highlight Nepal's success in peace process and constitution-making according to Eknath Dhakal. The Summit was one of the biggest event of its kind organized in Nepal and was also most debated event. Nepal Prime Minister KP Sharma Oli presided and opened the Summit along with several current heads of state and government. Dhakal met with many world leaders, heads of state and government on his peace mission including Myanmar's democratic icon Aung San Suu Kyi. Eknath Dhakal's “Family Party” making forays in Nepal politics on lines of India's Aam Admi party (AAP), seeking to create “New Nepal”. Ek Nath Dhakal is named as “Special Global Envoy” of World Summit during the 7th Rally of Hope. On November 22, 2022, Dhakal is re-elected as President of Nepal Family Party from the 3rd General Convention of the Party conducted with theme ‘Let us eliminate all sorts of discriminations: build a cultured, prosperous and inclusive Nepal’. Dhakal's party Nepal Family Party has joined UML led political alliance to contest general election to be held on November 20, 2022. Dhakal contested a seat in the House of Representatives with support from UML and media also reported that Dhakal's Family Party supported the candidacy of Suhang Nemwang in Ilam -2. Ek Nath Dhakal elected as the Member of the House of Representatives of the Federal Parliament of Nepal for the 3rd time from the general election held on November 20, 2022. Federal MP Ek Nath Dhakal has been nominated to the Foreign Relations and Tourism Committee of the House of Representatives. Ek Nath Dhakal participated inauguration ceremony of US President Donald Trump and Vice President JD Vance on 20th Jan. 2025. Dhakal also met with the President of the UNGA Philemon Yang at the United Nations headquarters. Ek Nath Dhakal appointed as "Secretary General" of the Inter-Parliamentary Speakers’ Conference (ISC) on April 11, 2025 —a global inter-governmental platform aimed at advancing parliamentary diplomacy and fostering international cooperation.

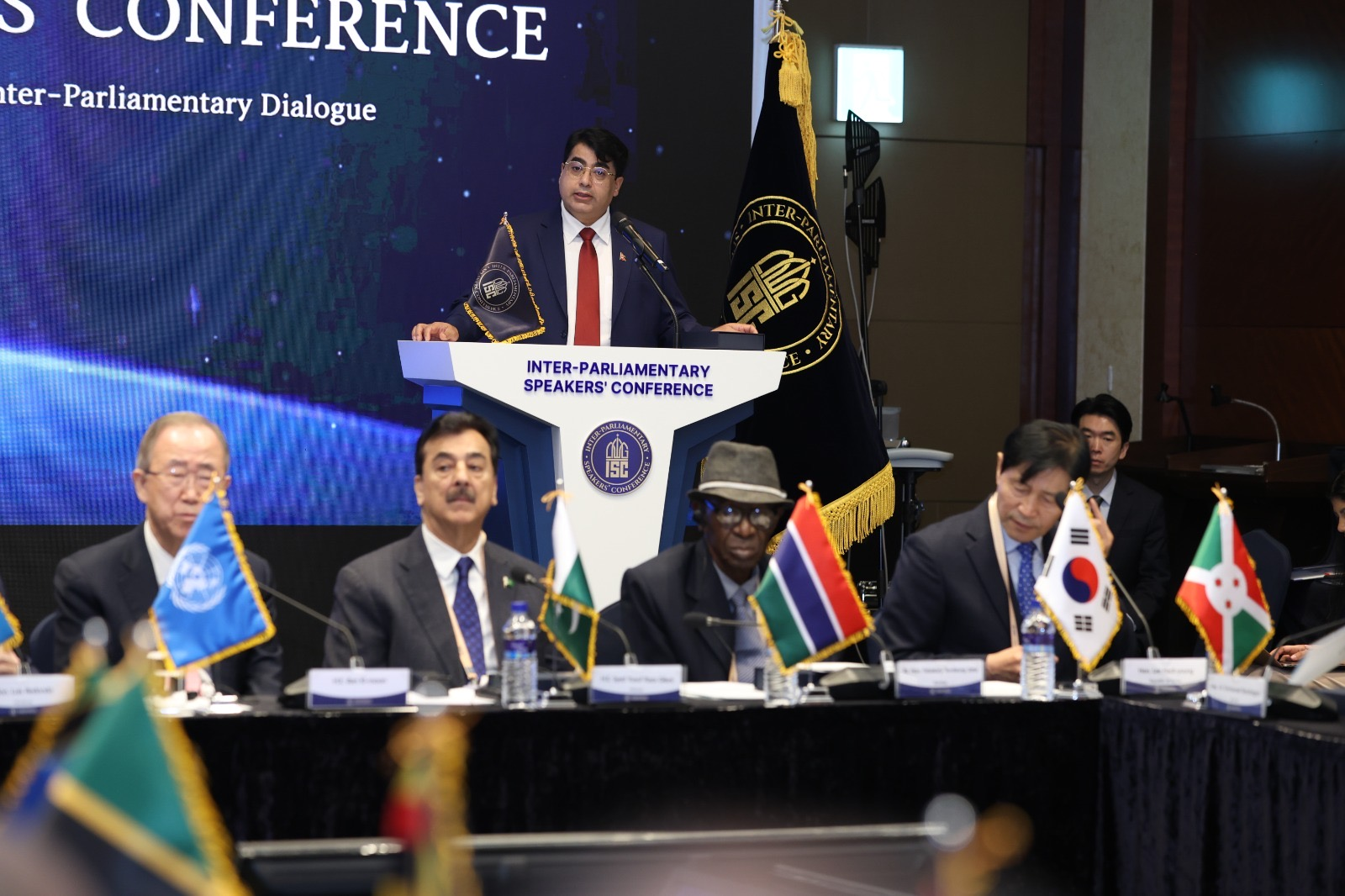
