= Khambuwan Rashtriya Morcha, Nepal =

Political party in Nepal

The Khambuwan National Front (Nepali: खम्वुवान राष्ट्रिय मोर्चा, नेपाल) is a political party in Nepal, which supports the formation of the ethnic state of Khambuwan for the Rai people. It is led by Ram Kumar Rai and Rajan Rai (R.K.Khambu and Rajan Bantawa).

The Khambuwan National Front won one seat in the 2013 Nepalese Constituent Assembly election.
