= Dinesh Chandra Yadav (Nepali politician) =

Nepali politician (died 2021)

Member of the Constituent Assembly
- In office 21 January 2014 – 14 October 2017
- Preceded by: Mohammad Ishtiyaq Rayi
- Succeeded by: Mohammad Ishtiyaq Rayi (as Member of Parliament)
- Constituency: Banke 2

Personal details
- Died: 14 January 2021 Kathmandu, Nepal
- Party: CPN (UML)

Dinesh Chandra Yadav (Nepali: दिनेशचन्द्र यादव) (died 14 January 2021) was a member of 2nd Nepalese Constituent Assembly.

== Biography ==
He won Banke–2 seat in 2013 Constituent Assembly election from Communist Party of Nepal (Unified Marxist–Leninist).

He tested positive for COVID-19 during the COVID-19 pandemic in Nepal on 27 December 2020, and died while undergoing treatment for the disease on January 14, 2021.
