= Ram Chandra Jha =

Nepali politician

- राम चन्द्र झा

Minister for General Administration
- In office 2009–2011
- President: Ram Baran Yadav
- Prime Minister: Madhav Kumar Nepal

Member of Constituent Assembly
- In office 2008–2013
- Preceded by: Smriti Narayan Chaudhary
- Succeeded by: Dinesh Prasad Parsaila Yadav
- Constituency: Dhanusha–1

Member of the House of Representatives
- In office 1994–1999
- Preceded by: Shivadhari Yadav
- Succeeded by: Smriti Narayan Chaudhary
- Constituency: Dhanusha–1

Personal details
- Born: Janakpur, Dhanusa, Nepal
- Party: CPN (Unified Socialist)

Ram Chandra Jha (Nepali: राम चन्द्र झा) is a Nepali politician of CPN (Unified Socialist). He is a member of the party's secretariat, the highest decision-making body within the organization. Jha also served as member of the 1st Constituent Assembly from Dhanusha-1.

== Political life ==
In the elections of 2056 BS and 2064 BS, Jha was elected from Dhanusha 1 on behalf of CPN (UML). In the 2070 election, Jha became the Maoist candidate. Jha, had briefly joined Naya Shakti led by Baburam Bhattarai from 2015 to 2017. Again, he returned to the Maoist before the elections. In the 2074 election, the Left Alliance had fielded a candidate in Dhanusha.

After the split in CPN (UML), Jha left the CPN (Maoist Centre) to join Madhav Kumar Nepal led CPN (Unified Socialist). After this, he said that he was finally able to return his home back.

== Electoral history ==
=== 2017 legislative elections ===
Dhanusha 2
Party	Candidate	Votes
Federal Socialist Forum, Nepal	Umashankar Argariya	32,044
CPN (Maoist Centre)	Ram Chandra Jha	18,715
Nepali Congress	Ram Krishna Yadav	15,442
Others		1,822
Invalid votes		3,648
Result	FSFN gain	
Source: Election Commission

=== 2013 Constituent Assembly election ===
Dhanusha 1
Party	Candidate	Votes
Nepali Congress	Dinesh Prasad Parsaila Yadav	8,827
Independent	Jog Kumar Barbariya Yadav	7,946
UCPN (Maoist)	Ram Chandra Jha	5,310
CPN (Unified Marxist–Leninist)	Ratneshwor Goit Yadav	4,175
Madhesi Jana Adhikar Forum, Nepal (Democratic)	Uma Shankar Argariya	3,137
Madhesi Jana Adhikar Forum, Nepal	Arun Singh Mandal Dhanuk	1,327
Others		4,085
Result	Congress gain	
Source: NepalNews

=== 2008 Constituent Assembly election ===
Dhanusha 1
Party	Candidate	Votes
CPN (Unified Marxist–Leninist)	Ram Chandra Jha	12,183
CPN (Maoist)	Jog Kumar Barbariya Yadav	9,608
Madhesi Jana Adhikar Forum, Nepal	Gajadhar Rohita Yadav	6,210
Nepali Congress	Smriti Narayan Chaudhary	5,354
Others		4,733
Invalid votes		2,932
Result	CPN (UML) gain	
Source: Election Commission

=== 1999 legislative elections ===
Dhanusha 1
Party	Candidate	Votes
Nepali Congress	Smriti Narayan Chaudhary	20,095
CPN (Unified Marxist–Leninist)	Ram Chandra Jha	18,352
CPN (Marxist–Leninist)	Ratneshwor Goit	7,228
Rastriya Prajatantra Party	Guru Sharan Rohita	1,035
Others		1,377
Invalid Votes		1,457
Result	Congress gain	
Source: Election Commission

=== 1994 legislative elections ===
Dhanusha 1
Party	Candidate	Votes
CPN (Unified Marxist–Leninist)	Ram Chandra Jha	20,749
Nepali Congress	Shiva Dhari Yadav	14,317
Rastriya Prajatantra Party	Madan Giri	4,677
Nepal Sadbhawana Party	Pradip Goit	1,637
Samyukta Janamorcha Nepal	Asarphi Minbar	1,636
Others		647
Result	CPN (UML) gain	
Source: Election Commission
