= Shailendra Kumar Yadav =

Nepalese politician

- शैलेन्द्र कुमार यादव
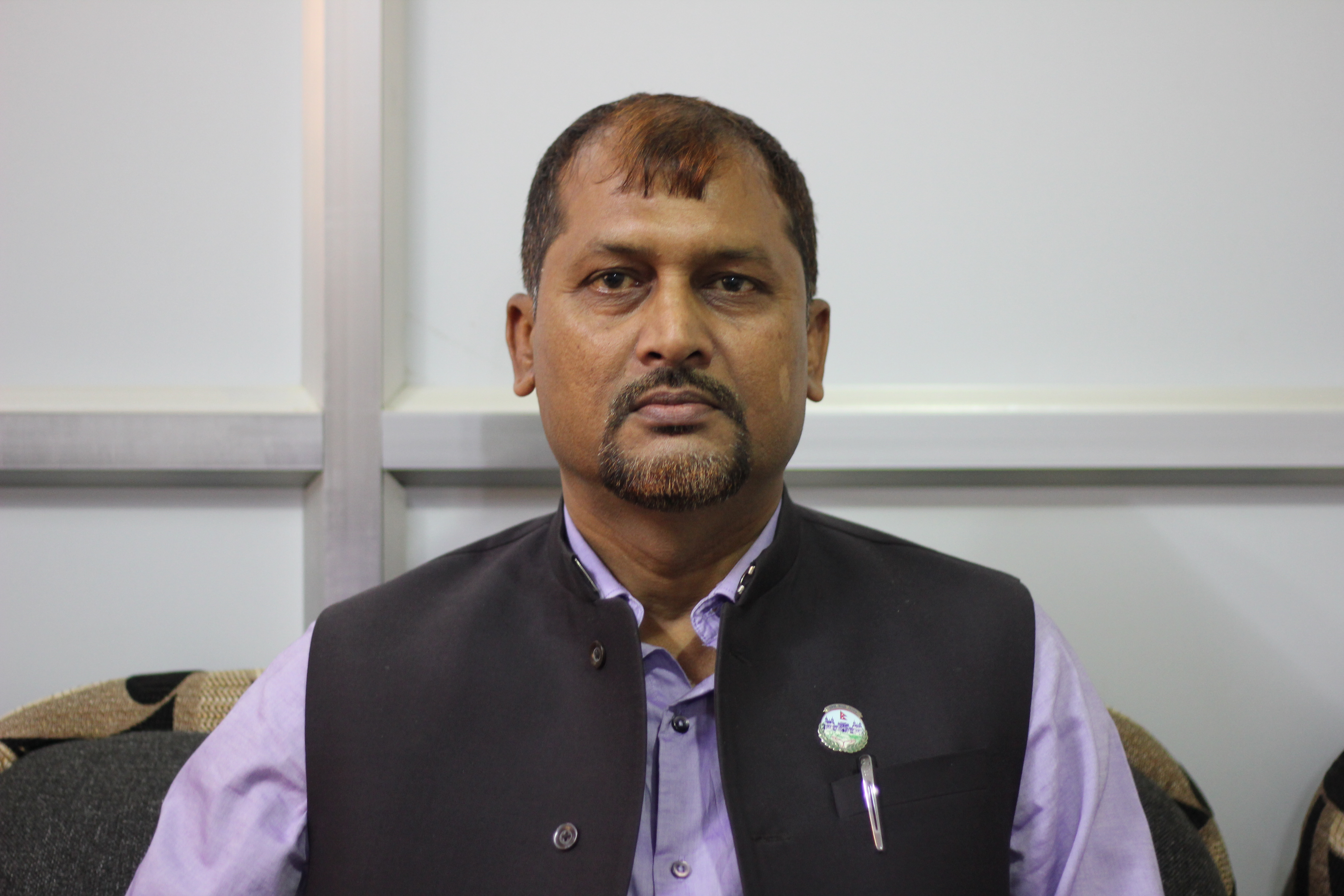
- Portrait of Yadav in 2019

Province Assembly Member of Madhesh Province
- In office 2017–2022

Personal details
- Citizenship: Nepalese
- Party: People's Socialist Party, Nepal
- Spouse: Sangita Yadav
- Children: Safal Yadav, Samrat Yadav
- Parent(s): Yugal Kishor Yadav, Siya Devi
- Occupation: Politician

Shailendra Kumar Yadav (Nepali: शैलेन्द्र कुमार यादव) is a Nepalese politician and a former member of the Provincial Assembly of Madhesh Province from the People's Socialist Party, Nepal. Yadav, a resident of Shahidnagar in Dhanusha was elected to the Provincial Assembly in the 2017 election from Dhanusha 2(A).

== Electoral history ==
=== 2017 Nepalese provincial elections ===
Party	Candidate	Votes
Federal Socialist Forum, Nepal	Shailendra Kumar Yadav	16,523
Communist Party of Nepal (Maoist Centre)	Nawal Kishore Sah	9,085
Nepali Congress	Rajeshwar Goit	7,386
Others		693
Invalid votes		1,503
Result	FSFN gain	
Source: Election Commission
