= Madesh Samata Party Nepal =

Nepalese political party

The Madesh Samata Party Nepal (Nepali: जनजागरण पार्टी नेपाल is a political party in Nepal. It is led by Meghraj Sahani.

The Madesh Samata Party won 1 seat in the 2013 Nepalese Constituent Assembly election.
