= Dinesh Prasad Parshaila Yadav =

Honourable Dinesh Prasad Parshaila Yadav
- दिनेश प्रसाद प्रसैला यादव

Member of Constituent Assembly
- In office 2013–2017
- Preceded by: Ram Chandra Jha
- Constituency: Dhanusha 1

Personal details
- Party: Nepali Congress
- Occupation: Politician

Dinesh Prasad Parshaila Yadav is a Nepali politician belonging to Nepali Congress. He is the former member of 2nd Nepalese Constituent Assembly having been elected from Dhanusha 1.

== Electoral history ==
=== 2013 Constituent Assembly election ===
Party	Candidate	Votes
Nepali Congress	Dinesh Prasad Parsaila Yadav	8,827
Independent	Jog Kumar Barbariya Yadav	7,946
UCPN (Maoist)	Ram Chandra Jha	5,310
CPN (Unified Marxist–Leninist)	Ratneshwor Goit Yadav	4,175
Madhesi Jana Adhikar Forum, Nepal (Democratic)	Uma Shankar Argariya	3,137
Madhesi Jana Adhikar Forum, Nepal	Arun Singh Mandal Dhanuk	1,327
Others		4,085
Result	Congress gain	
Source: NepalNews
