= Nepal Pariwar Dal =

Nepal Pariwar Dal नेपाल परिवार दल
- Leader: Ek Nath Dhakal
- Headquarters: Kathmandu, Nepal
- Ideology: Familialism; Conservatism
- Political position: Centre-right
- Religion: Hindu

Nepal Pariwar Dal (translation: Nepal Family Party) is a Nepalese political party supporting family values.

== History ==
In the 2008 Constituent Assembly election, the party won one seat through the Proportional Representation vote. The party selected Ek Nath Dhakal as its representative in the assembly. Party leader Ek Nath Dhakal was discussed to become Prime Minister to lead Nepal's consensus government. Nepal Pariwar Dal announced its candidates from all 240 constituencies of Nepal for the election of the constituent Assembly schedule on November 19, 2013. Nepal Pariwar Dal won two seats in the second Constituent Assembly election. Party leader Ek Nath Dhakal was served as Minister for Peace and Reconstruction in the Government of Nepal. Nepal Pariwar Dal (Nepal Family Party) reached a five-point agreement with the UML and formed alliance for local elections 2022. Family Party President Ek Nath Dhakal contested a seat in the House of Representatives in the 2022 general election in alliance led by CPN-UML leader and former prime minister KP Sharma Oli. All elected representatives of Punarbas Municipality Ward No. 8 join the Nepal Family Party
