= 2013 Nepalese Constituent Assembly election =

- 19 November 2013

All 575 seats in the Constituent Assembly 288 seats needed for a majority
- Turnout: 79.82%
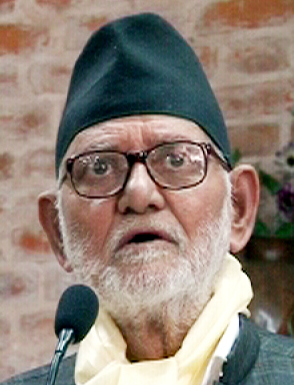

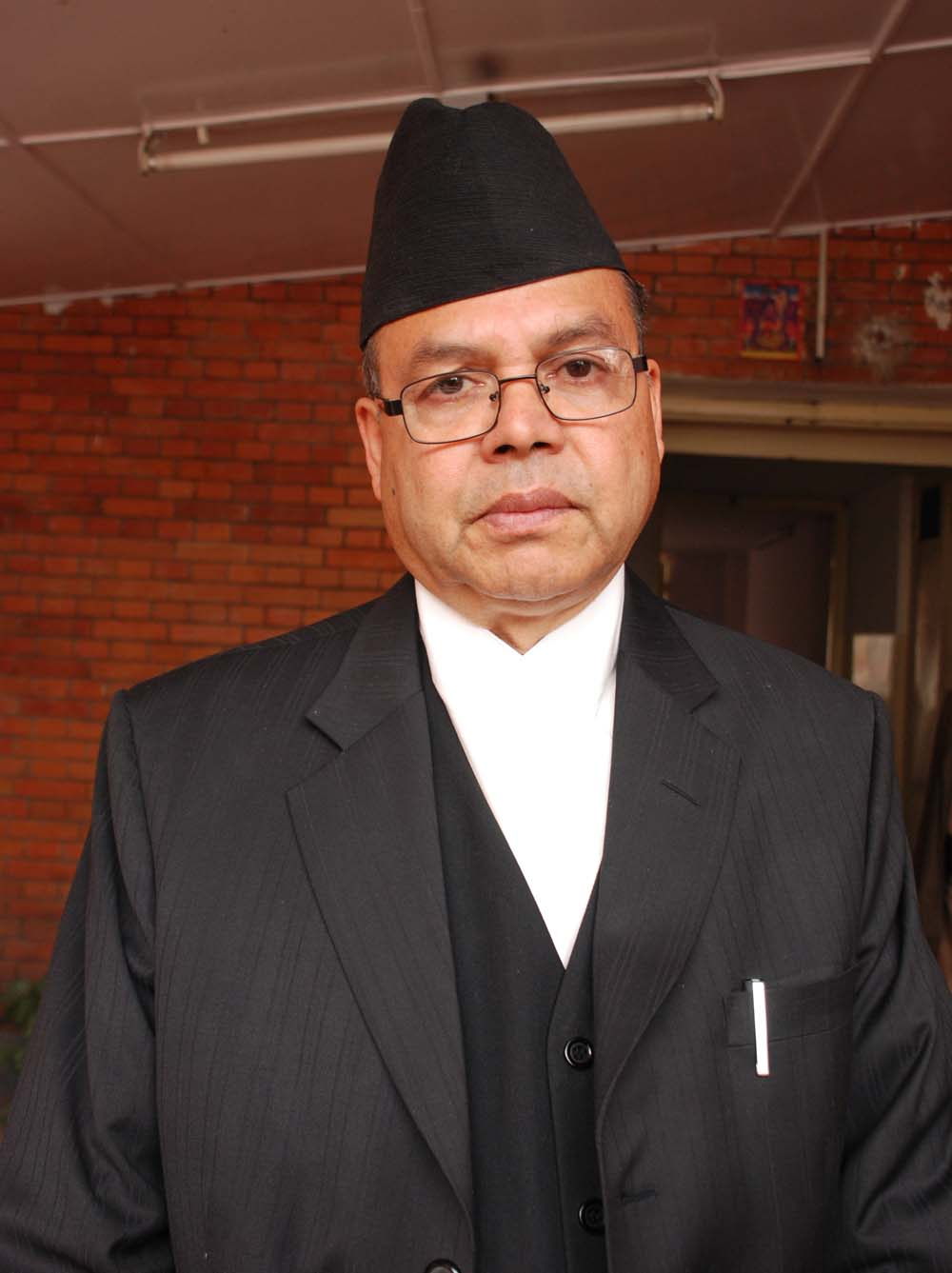

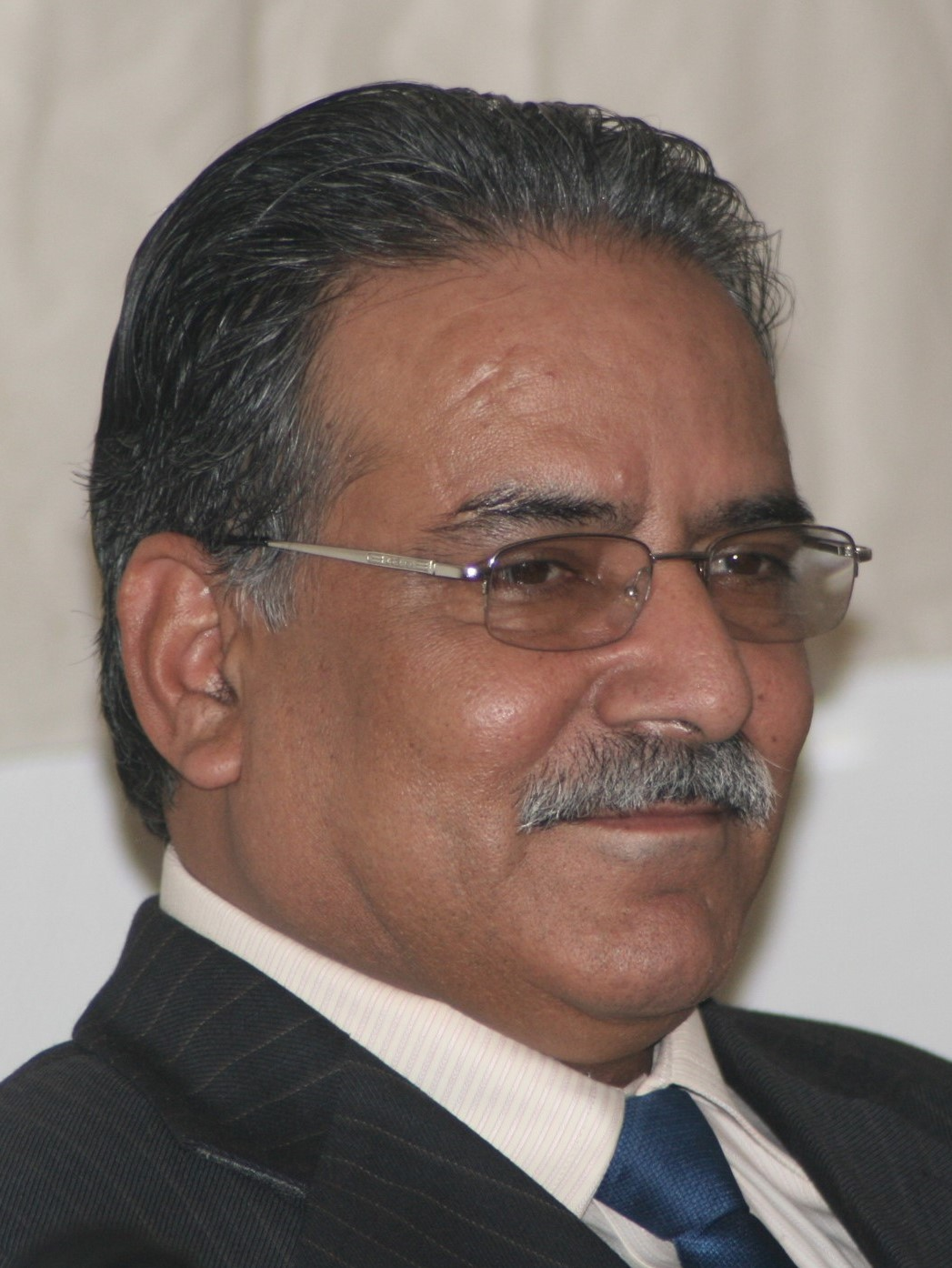

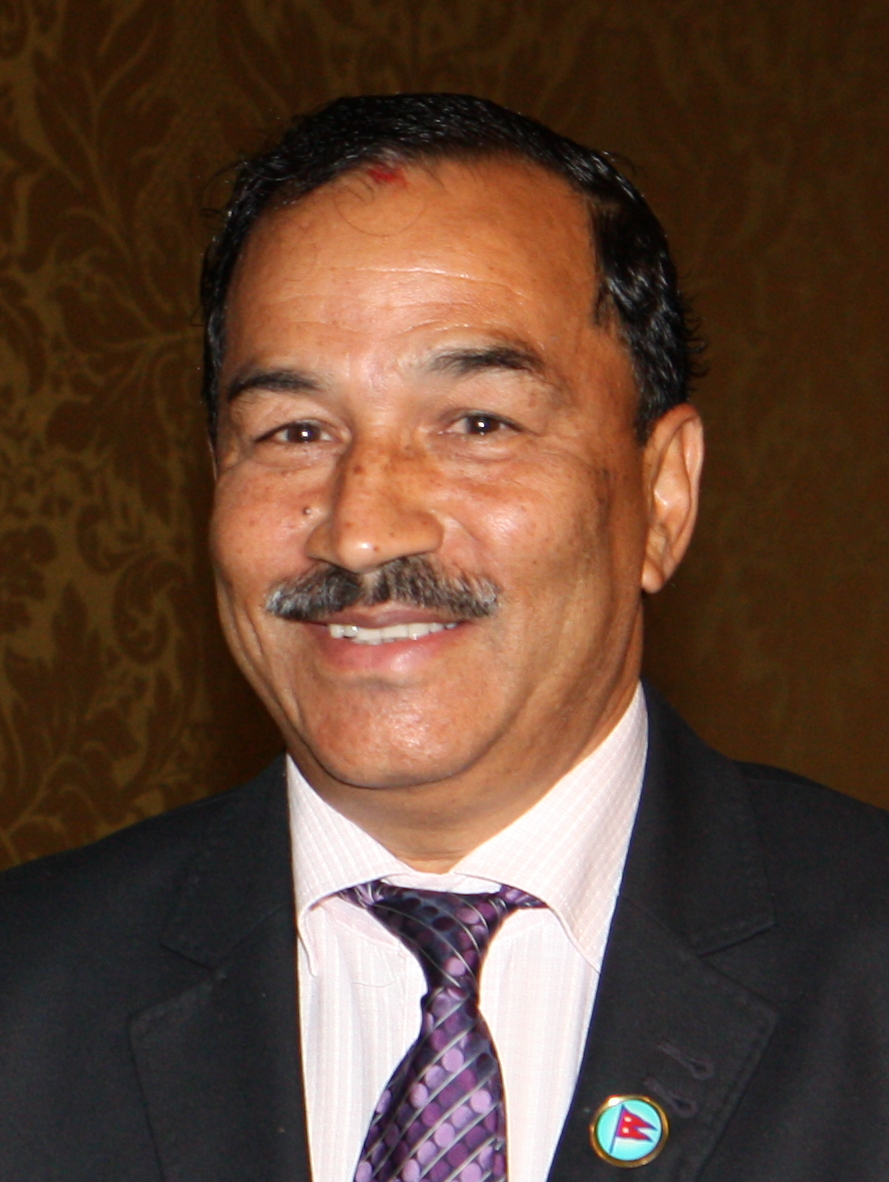

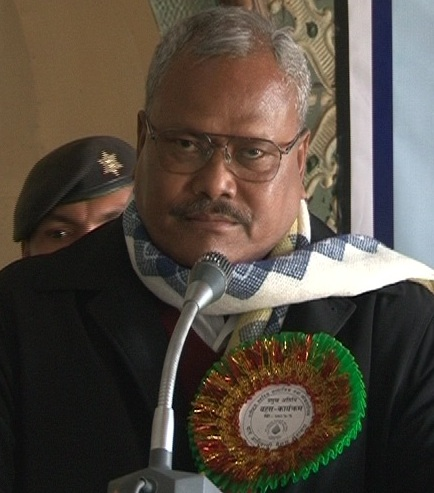

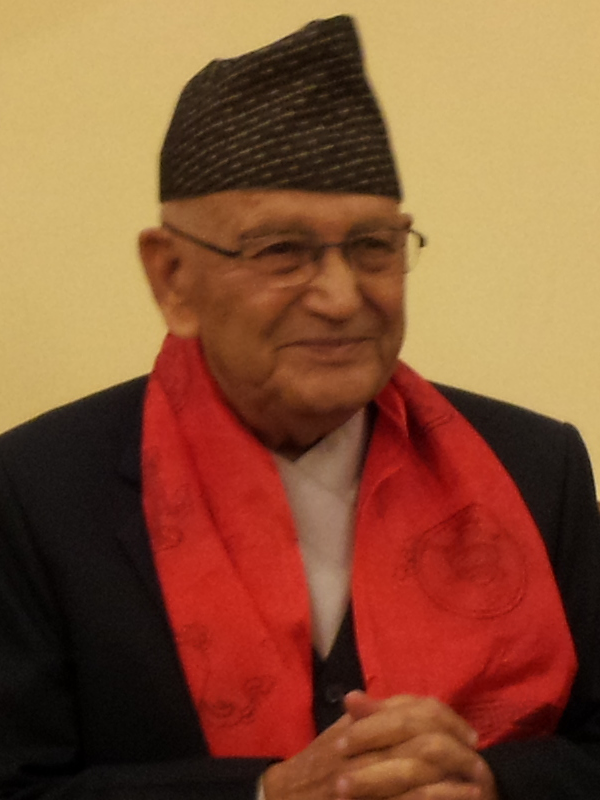

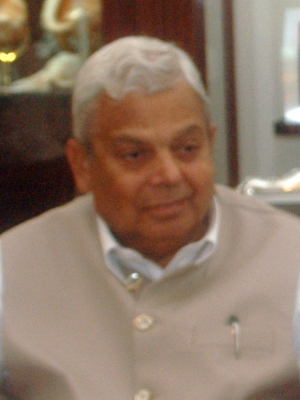

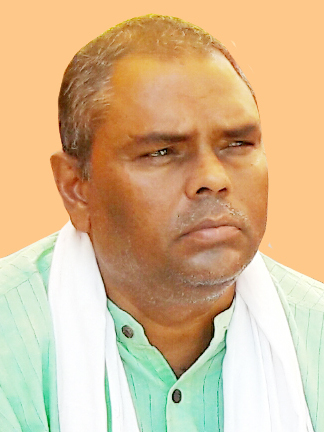
	First party	Second party	Third party
Leader	Sushil Koirala	Jhala Nath Khanal	Pushpa Kamal Dahal
Party	Congress	CPN (UML)	Maoist Centre
Last election	21.14%, 110 seats	20.33%, 103 seats	30.81%, 227 seats (Note: 220 seats, 29.28%; CPN (Maoist) and 7 seats, 1.53%; Janamorcha Nepal)
Seats won	196	175	80
Seat change	▲86	▲72	▼147
Popular vote	2,418,370	2,239,609	1,439,726
Percentage	25.55%	23.66%	15.21%
Swing	▲4.41pp	▲3.33pp	▼15.06pp
	Fourth party	Fifth party	Sixth party
Leader	Kamal Thapa	Bijay Kumar Gachhadar	Surya Bahadur Thapa
Party	RPP-Nepal	MJFN (Loktantrik)	RPP
Last election	1.03%, 4 seats	New entry	3.40%, 11 seats (Note: 8 seats, 2.45%; RPP and 3 seats, 0.95%; Janshakti)
Seats won	24	14	13
Seat change	▲20	New entry	▲2
Popular vote	630,697	274,987	260,234
Percentage	6.66%	2.91%	2.75%
Swing	▲5.63%	New entry	▼0.65pp
	Seventh party	Eighth party
Leader	Mahantha Thakur	Upendra Yadav
Party	TMLP	MJF-N
Last election	3.16%, 20 seats	6.32%, 52 seats
Seats won	11	10
Seat change	▼9	▼42
Popular vote	181,140	214,319
Percentage	1.91%	2.26%
Swing	▼1.25pp	▼4.06pp
Prime Minister before election
Khil Raj Regmi
Independent
Prime Minister after election
Sushil Koirala
Congress

Constituent Assembly elections were held in Nepal on 19 November 2013. The vote was repeatedly delayed, having previously been planned for 22 November 2012 following the dissolution of the 1st Constituent Assembly on 27 May 2012, but it was put off by the election commission. The Nepali Congress emerged as the largest party in the 2nd Nepalese Constituent Assembly, winning 196 of the 575 elected seats.

== Background ==
Following King Gyanendra's suspension of Parliament and government takeover during the Nepalese Civil War, mass protests led to him to re-instate Parliament and end the war fought by the government against the Communist Party of Nepal (Maoist), on the condition that the constitution would be re-written. The king's powers were also removed and an election was held in 2008 to elect a Constituent Assembly. The Constituent Assembly was tasked with writing a new constitution; however, its deadline was extended several times, with the last one set for 27 May 2012.

In the lead up to the deadline, there were several violent protests by a variety of ethnic groups outside the Parliament building. Rallies were then banned in the area and around the PM's office with riot police guarding against protests and the Nepali Army on high alert in case the situation could not be controlled. Prime Minister Baburam Bhattarai called for a new election on 22 November after the deadline passed, with a possibility of a state of emergency. A member of his party, Post Bahadur Bogati, announced that "it is not possible to promulgate the constitution within the deadline now. That possibility is out, 100 percent."

On the deadline day there were large protests as talks between the CPN (Maoist), Nepali Congress, Communist Party of Nepal (Unified Marxist-Leninist) and the Madhesi Front were ongoing. The talks broke down after the incumbent CPN (Maoist)'s demands for 10 to 14 new provinces largely along ethnic groups lines, which was supported by several small Madhesi parties calling for autonomy, was opposed by the Nepali Congress and the CPN (UML). CPN (Maoist) member Narayankaji Shrestha said that "a constitution is not possible without federal states recognising the identity of ethnic groups." The opponents of the proposal said the move could lead to tensions amongst different castes. Ram Sharan Mahat of the Nepali Congress said that the CPN (Maoist) "want[ed] to kill the assembly, not make the constitution" in order to stay in power. At a cabinet session that night CPN (UML) general secretary and Deputy Prime Minister Ishwor Pokhrel walked out saying that the move was "unconstitutional, neither is it based on political consensus." However, the Madhesi leader Laxman Lal Karna said that "in the afternoon, the NC and the [CPN-]UML had said there was no chance of a deal. Let us go for polls. We have done the democratic thing." The CPN (Maoist)'s Barsha Man Pun then announced the election saying that "we had no other alternative. We apologise for not being able to prepare the constitution."

The Nepali Congress claimed the delays were a ploy by the UCPN (M) to remain in power and that Maoist-led government's "unilateral decision was unexpected". However, according to an AFP interview on Rajkishore Yadav, the Maoist-led government "wanted to conduct elections in November 22" but the election commission insisted that "the lack of a workable constitution meant there were no legal provisions for holding a vote".

In mid-September 2013, an opposition one-day strike called for the cancellation of the election.

== Opinion polls ==
In mid-2011, an opinion indicated that 45% of respondents opposed an extension of the CA's mandate. A majority of respondents were uncertain about who they would vote for. Similarly, there were calls for a fresh election by opposition politicians at the time. Most respondents also said a new constitution was the topmost priority.

In the Himal Media opinion poll conducted in March 2013, voters expressed a slight preference for the Nepali Congress, 14.9%, over the CPN (UML), 11.3%, and UCPN (Maoist), 7.3%.

== Conduct ==
In the morning of the election, a bomb exploded near a voting station wounding three people after a boy picked up what he thought was a toy that then exploded. It also follows days of similar attacks by those opposed to the election. On December 16, Mohan Baidya, Chairman of the breakaway CPN(Maoist) which had boycotted the elections publicly stated his party had planted bombs across the country prior to the elections.

== Turnout ==
Voters turned out in record numbers with nationwide turnout averaging 78.34% breaking the previous record of 68.15% in the 1991 general elections. The highest turnout was in Dolpa-1 at 89.5% and the lowest in Baitadi-2 at 67.32%.

== Results ==
Initial results showed the Nepali Congress winning a plurality of the first-past-the-post seats with 105 of the 240 seats; the CPM-UML close behind with 91; and the Maoists far behind, winning just 26. Smaller parties and two independent candidates won the remaining 18 seats. 335 seats were allotted by proportional representation using a modified Sainte-Laguë method of allocation.

Party	Proportional			Constituency			Total seats	+/–
Party	Votes	%	Seats	Votes	%	Seats	Total seats	+/–
Nepali Congress	2,418,370	25.55	91	2,694,983	29.80	105	196	+81
Communist Party of Nepal (Unified Marxist–Leninist)	2,239,609	23.66	84	2,492,090	27.55	91	175	+67
Unified Communist Party of Nepal (Maoist)	1,439,726	15.21	54	1,609,145	17.79	26	80	–149
Rastriya Prajatantra Party Nepal	630,697	6.66	24	252,579	2.79	0	24	+20
Madheshi Jana Adhikar Forum, Nepal (Loktantrik)	274,987	2.91	10	283,468	3.13	4	14	New
Rastriya Prajatantra Party	260,234	2.75	10	238,313	2.63	3	13	+5
Madheshi Jana Adhikar Forum, Nepal	214,319	2.26	8	206,110	2.28	2	10	–44
Terai Madhesh Loktantrik Party	181,140	1.91	7	171,889	1.90	4	11	–10
Sadbhavana Party	133,271	1.41	5	140,930	1.56	1	6	–3
Communist Party of Nepal (Marxist–Leninist)	130,300	1.38	5	98,091	1.08	0	5	–4
Federal Socialist Party	121,274	1.28	5	108,683	1.20	0	5	New
Rastriya Janamorcha	92,387	0.98	3	66,666	0.74	0	3	–1
Communist Party of Nepal (United)	91,997	0.97	3	24,808	0.27	0	3	–2
Rashtriya Madhesh Samajwadi Party	79,508	0.84	3	76,392	0.84	0	3	New
Nepal Workers Peasants Party	66,778	0.71	3	54,323	0.60	1	4	–1
Rastriya Janamukti Party	63,834	0.67	2	39,362	0.44	0	2	0
Terai Madhes Sadbhavana Party	62,746	0.66	2	65,049	0.72	1	3	New
Tharuhat Tarai Party Nepal	62,526	0.66	2	38,972	0.43	0	2	New
Nepal Pariwar Dal	51,823	0.55	2	14,546	0.16	0	2	New
Dalit Janajati Party	48,802	0.52	2	33,517	0.37	0	2	+1
Akhanda Nepal Party	36,883	0.39	1	12,590	0.14	0	1	New
Madeshi Janadikar Forum (Gantantrik)	33,982	0.36	1	35,289	0.39	0	1	New
Nepali Janata Dal	33,203	0.35	1	6,816	0.08	0	1	–1
Khambuwan Rashtriya Morcha, Nepal	30,686	0.32	1	6,451	0.07	0	1	New
Nepa Rastriya Party	28,011	0.30	1	9,377	0.10	0	1	0
Jana Jagaran Party Nepal	27,397	0.29	1	3,510	0.04	0	1	New
Sanghiya Sadhbhawana Party	25,215	0.27	1	20,395	0.23	0	1	New
Madhesh Samata Party Nepal	23,001	0.24	1	8,130	0.09	0	1	New
Samajwadi Janata Party	21,624	0.23	1	4,661	0.05	0	1	New
Sanghiya Loktantrik Rastriya Manch (Tharuhat)	21,128	0.22	1	4,622	0.05	0	1	New
Sanghiya Gantantrik Samajwadi Party Nepal	18,631	0.20	0	8,950	0.10	0	0	New
Communist Party of Nepal	18,140	0.19	0	8,291	0.09	0	0	New
Nepal Yuwa Kisan Party	16,204	0.17	0	2,457	0.03	0	0	New
Nepal Janata Party	15,650	0.17	0	2,441	0.03	0	0	0
Nepal Sadbhawana Party	15,578	0.16	0	12,572	0.14	0	0	New
Khas Samabeshi Rashtriya Party	15,225	0.16	0	6,035	0.07	0	0	New
Terai Madhesh Pahad Himal Ekata Party	12,466	0.13	0	2,212	0.02	0	0	New
Akhanda Sudhur Pashchim Party	12,334	0.13	0	5,548	0.06	0	0	New
Madhesh Terai Forum	11,286	0.12	0	3,632	0.04	0	0	New
Rashtriya Swabhiman Party Nepal	11,270	0.12	0	1,550	0.02	0	0	New
Lok Dal	10,953	0.12	0	748	0.01	0	0	New
Janata Dal Nepal	10,645	0.11	0	350	0.00	0	0	New
Nepal Loktantrik Samajbadi Dal	10,359	0.11	0	1,552	0.02	0	0	–1
Janata Dal Loktantrik Party	10,018	0.11	0	1,478	0.02	0	0	New
Jana Prajatantrik Party	8,645	0.09	0	1,318	0.01	0	0	New
Shiva Sena Nepal	8,416	0.09	0	3,479	0.04	0	0	New
Picchada Barga Nishad Dalit Janajati Party	8,332	0.09	0	255	0.00	0	0	New
Mongol National Organisation	8,215	0.09	0	4,669	0.05	0	0	0
Nava Nepal Nirman Party	8,119	0.09	0	1,398	0.02	0	0	New
Chure Bhawar Rastriya Ekta Party Nepal	7,975	0.08	0	2,410	0.03	0	0	–1
Communist Party of Nepal (Marxist–Leninist–Maoist) Samyabadi	7,781	0.08	0	247	0.00	0	0	New
Nepal Shanti Kshetra Parishad	7,757	0.08	0	41	0.00	0	0	0
Nepal Gantantrik Ekata Party	7,178	0.08	0				0	New
Sanghiya Limbuwan Rajya Parishad	7,063	0.07	0	3,063	0.03	0	0	New
Bishwa Satyabadi Party	6,666	0.07	0	111	0.00	0	0	New
Sahakari Party Nepal	6,141	0.06	0	847	0.01	0	0	New
Rastriya Janata Dal Nepall	6,097	0.06	0	2,569	0.03	0	0	0
Shanti Party Nepal	6,032	0.06	0	1,659	0.02	0	0	0
Sanghiya Samabeshi Samajwadi Party, Nepal	5,978	0.06	0	65	0.00	0	0	New
Garib Ekta Samaj Party, Nepal	5,859	0.06	0	421	0.00	0	0	New
Madhesi Janadikar Forum Madhesh	5,814	0.06	0	2,197	0.02	0	0	New
Rashtriya Yatharthabadi Party Nepal	5,505	0.06	0	953	0.01	0	0	New
Nepal Ama Party	5,491	0.06	0	1,542	0.02	0	0	New
Janata Dal United	5,396	0.06	0	522	0.01	0	0	New
Rashtriya Shiva Sena Party	5,371	0.06	0	1,959	0.02	0	0	New
Rashtriya Madhesh Bahujan Samajwadi Party	5,301	0.06	0	869	0.01	0	0	New
Samyukta Rashtrabadi Morcha Nepal	5,225	0.06	0	812	0.01	0	0	New
Rashtriya Mukti Andolan Nepal	5,216	0.06	0	167	0.00	0	0	New
Chure Bhawar Loktantrik Party	5,085	0.05	0	566	0.01	0	0	New
Nepal Nagarik Party	4,861	0.05	0	691	0.01	0	0	New
Nepal Labour Party	4,837	0.05	0	982	0.01	0	0	New
Nepal Sadbhawana Party (Gajendrawadi)	4,824	0.05	0	1,679	0.02	0	0	New
Rashtriya Nagarik Party	4,668	0.05	0	290	0.00	0	0	New
Chure Bhawar Rashtriya Party	4,650	0.05	0	577	0.01	0	0	New
Nepal Sadbhawana Party (United)	4,578	0.05	0	1,285	0.01	0	0	New
Bahujan Samaj Party Nepal	4,522	0.05	0	460	0.01	0	0	New
Jantantrik Terai Madhes Mukti Tigers	4,370	0.05	0	2,755	0.03	0	0	New
Hindu Prajatantrik Party, Nepal	4,215	0.04	0	178	0.00	0	0	New
Naya Nepal Rashtriya Party	4,140	0.04	0	55	0.00	0	0	New
Jana Unity-Cooperative Party of Nepal	4,066	0.04	0	2,125	0.02	0	0	New
Nepal Samabeshi Party	3,882	0.04	0	131	0.00	0	0	New
Deshbhakta Samaaj	3,866	0.04	0	703	0.01	0	0	New
Limbuwan Mukti Morcha	3,748	0.04	0	398	0.00	0	0	New
Liberal Democratic Party	3,721	0.04	0	407	0.00	0	0	New
Nepal Jana Sambeshi Ekata Party	3,674	0.04	0	142	0.00	0	0	New
Nepal Communist Party (ML-Socialist)	3,661	0.04	0	788	0.01	0	0	New
Janata Party Nepal	3,595	0.04	0	1,354	0.01	0	0	New
Rashtriya Chure Bhawar Party	3,484	0.04	0	403	0.00	0	0	New
Nepal Gauravshali Party	3,388	0.04	0	116	0.00	0	0	New
Nepal Rastriya Bikas Party	3,373	0.04	0	550	0.01	0	0	0
Rastrabadi Ekta Party	3,365	0.04	0	750	0.01	0	0	0
Social Republican Party	3,360	0.04	0	541	0.01	0	0	New
Deshbhakta Paryavaraniya Samajik Morcha	3,293	0.03	0	217	0.00	0	0	New
United Green Organisation	3,229	0.03	0	94	0.00	0	0	New
Jana Morcha Nepal	3,181	0.03	0	876	0.01	0	0	New
Nepal Rashtra Sewa Dal	3,127	0.03	0	183	0.00	0	0	New
Loktantrik Party - Nepal	3,107	0.03	0	249	0.00	0	0	New
Rastriya Jana Bikas Party	3,102	0.03	0	67	0.00	0	0	New
Matribhumi Nepal Dal	3,099	0.03	0	440	0.00	0	0	New
Naya Sanghiyata Janadharana Party	3,007	0.03	0				0	New
Nepal Rashtriya Yatayat Bikash Dal	2,952	0.03	0	12	0.00	0	0	New
Rashtrabadi Ekata Party	2,905	0.03	0	394	0.00	0	0	New
Limbuwan Mukti Morcha Nepal	2,844	0.03	0	741	0.01	0	0	New
Nepal Samajwadi Party (Lohiaite)	2,743	0.03	0	743	0.01	0	0	New
Sanghiya Bikashbadi Party Nepal	2,652	0.03	0				0	New
Rashtrabadi Janata Party	2,505	0.03	0	762	0.01	0	0	New
Nepal Janabhavana Party	2,439	0.03	0	28	0.00	0	0	0
Nepal Nyayik Dal	2,379	0.03	0	146	0.00	0	0	New
Tamangsaling Rashtriya Janaekta Party	2,308	0.02	0	36	0.00	0	0	New
Samyukta Jana Morcha	2,225	0.02	0	147	0.00	0	0	New
Shramik Janata Party - Nepal	2,034	0.02	0	45	0.00	0	0	New
Rashtriya Madhesh Ekata Party, Nepal	2,031	0.02	0	850	0.01	0	0	New
Om Sena Nepal	2,011	0.02	0	18	0.00	0	0	New
Hariyali Party Nepal	1,927	0.02	0	251	0.00	0	0	New
Nepal Madhesi Janata Dal (S)	1,902	0.02	0	334	0.00	0	0	New
Nepal Shramjivi Dal	1,891	0.02	0	40	0.00	0	0	New
Yuwa Shakti Nepal Party	1,820	0.02	0	22	0.00	0	0	New
League Nepal Shanti Ekta Party	1,813	0.02	0	435	0.00	0	0	0
Loktantrik Janata Party Nepal	1,729	0.02	0	135	0.00	0	0	New
Terai Pahad Himal Samaj Party	1,697	0.02	0	81	0.00	0	0	New
Rashtriya Loktantrik Yuwa Party	1,191	0.01	0	34	0.00	0	0	New
Nepali Janata Party	996	0.01	0				0	New
Garib Janatako Kranti Party				682	0.01	0	0	New
Nepal Democratic Progressive Party				10	0.00	0	0	New
Independents				107,764	1.19	2	2	0
Total	9,463,862	100.00	335	9,044,908	100.00	240	575	–26
Valid votes	9,463,862	96.80		9,044,908	95.04			
Invalid/blank votes	312,841	3.20		471,826	4.96			
Total votes	9,776,703	100.00		9,516,734	100.00			
Registered voters/turnout	12,249,062	79.82		12,147,865	78.34			
Source: Election Commission, Nepal, Republica, IJSR

== Reaction ==
Domestic

The UCPN (Maoist) leader Prachanda protested the conduct of the election, alleging fraud, and threatening to withdraw from the Constituent Assembly. However domestic and international pressure mounted and various political leaders from Nepali Congress and CPN UML urged Unified Maoist to accept the peoples verdict and get involved in the process of a peaceful CA. Subsequently, an internal assessment by the party concluded vote-rigging was not the cause of the party's defeat and mentioned "misrepresentation of the party on issue of federalism and the party’s split" as reasons for defeat. On December 25, 2013, the UCPN (Maoist) offered unconditional support to the Nepali Congress to form the next government following the signing of a four-point deal between the NC, CPN(UML), UCPN (Maoist) and Madesbadi parties that agreed to form a parliamentary body to investigate election irregularities.

In response to the allegations of fraud leveled by the Maoist and smaller parties, Chief Election Commissioner Nilkantha Upreti affirmed the elections were "concluded in a free, fair, impartial and credible manner" and urged voters "not to believe in such misleading publicity" about the fairness of the elections.

Supranational

- European Union: High Representative of the European Union for Foreign Affairs and Security Policy, Catherine Ashton, issued a statement congratulating "the people of Nepal for having exercised their right to vote in large numbers, despite attempts to prevent them from doing so."
- UN: Secretary General Ban Ki-moon in his congratulatory message to the Nepali people stated “the United Nations remains committed to supporting Nepal in its transition towards a peaceful, democratic and prosperous future.”

International

- Germany: The Federal Office congratulated the interim government for holding free and credible CA elections and said "high turnout in the election has testified Nepalese people´s firm commitment to democracy and the rule of law".
- India: The External Affairs Ministry congratulated "the people of Nepal, political parties, government and security forces and the Election Commission of Nepal" for "conducting free and fair elections for the Constituent Assembly".
- China: The Embassy welcomed the "smooth holding" of the Constituent Assembly elections and said it "sincerely hopes that the political forces in Nepal will continue to strengthen dialogue and consultations for early completion of the constitution-making process and realize its goal of national stability and development".
- Japan: The Election Observation Mission composed of officials from the Ministry of Foreign Affairs and an outside expert from Tokushima University and headed by Japanese Ambassador, Masashi Ogawa, concluded the "election was conducted in a peaceful, free and fair manner without serious irregularities". A statement issued by the Embassy read: "Japan hopes that this election will further consolidate democracy in Nepal and its post-electoral political process toward promulgating a constitution will develop smoothly. Japan will continue to support Nepal's efforts for peace-building and the consolidation of democracy".
- UK: Foreign and Commonwealth Office Minister Hugo Swire congratulated the people of Nepal and stated "these elections were generally peaceful and well run, a credit to the people and the election authorities"
- (United States) : The White House Press Secretary hailed the elections as "a milestone not just for Nepal but for people around the world working to rebuild after conflicts and resolve disputes via constitutional and homegrown means" and pledged continued support for Nepal's democratic exercise.
  - Former US President Jimmy Carter congratulated Nepal on a "well conducted election process" and urged the UCPN (Maoist) to "respect the will of Nepali voters as expressed on election day".

== Gallery ==
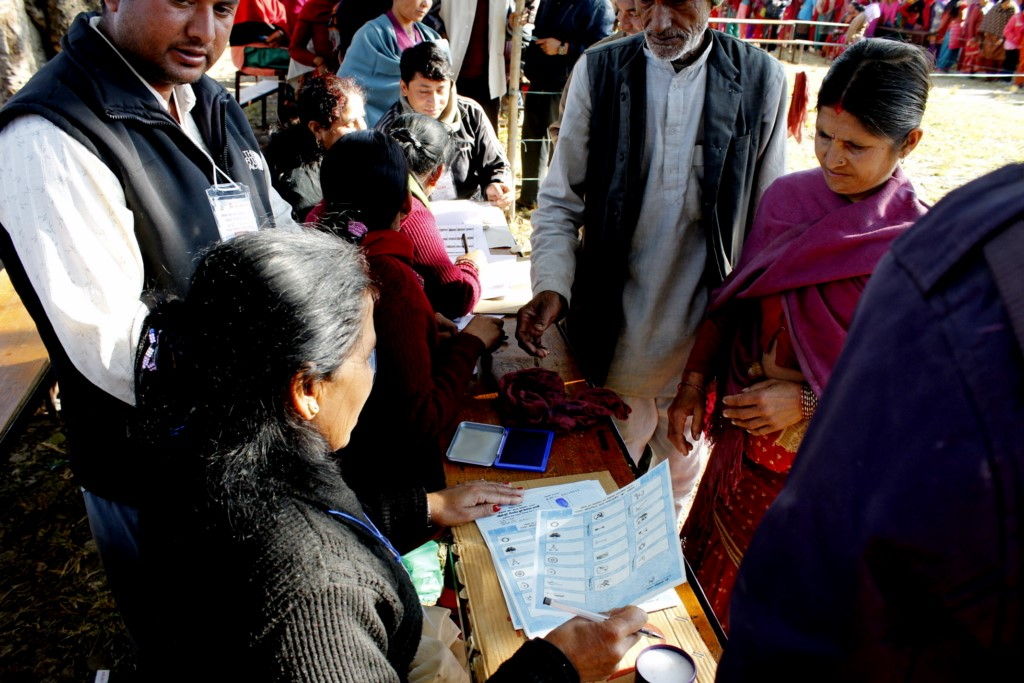

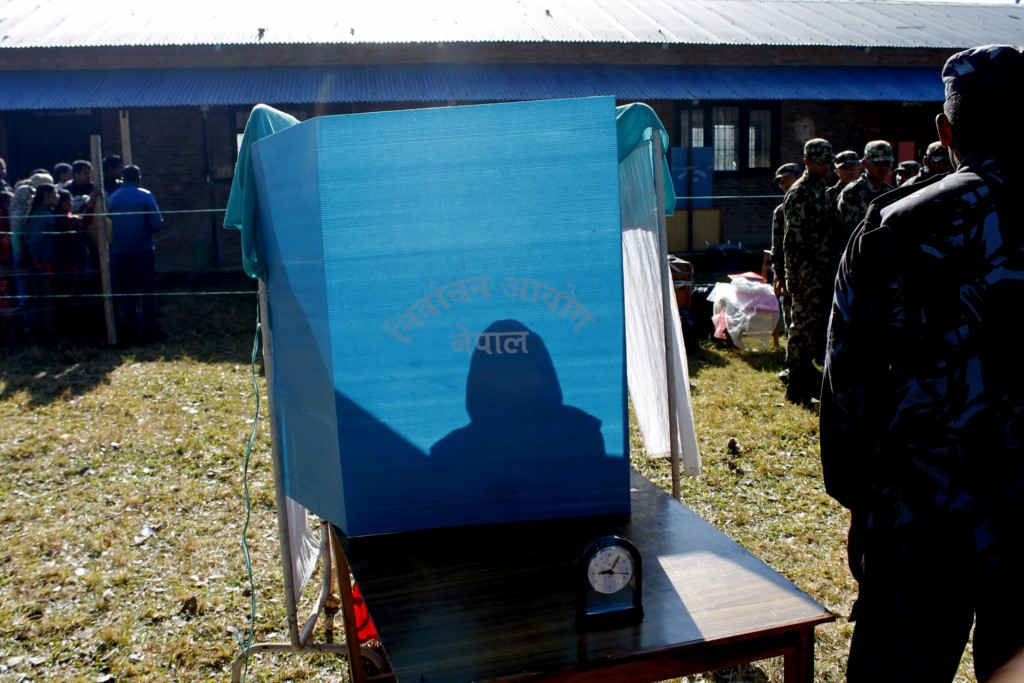

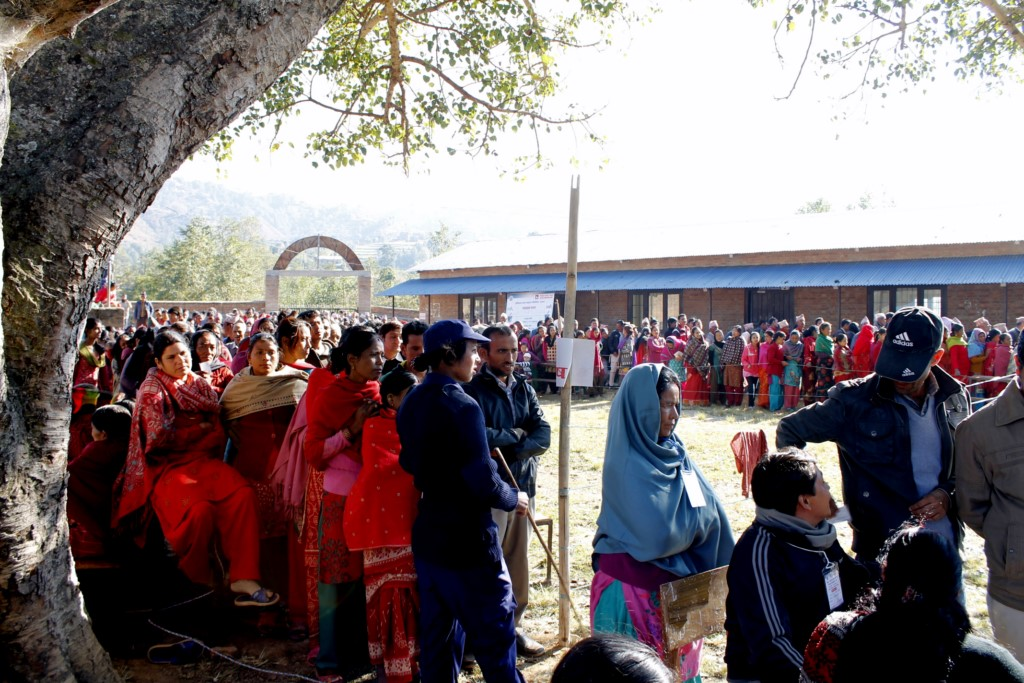

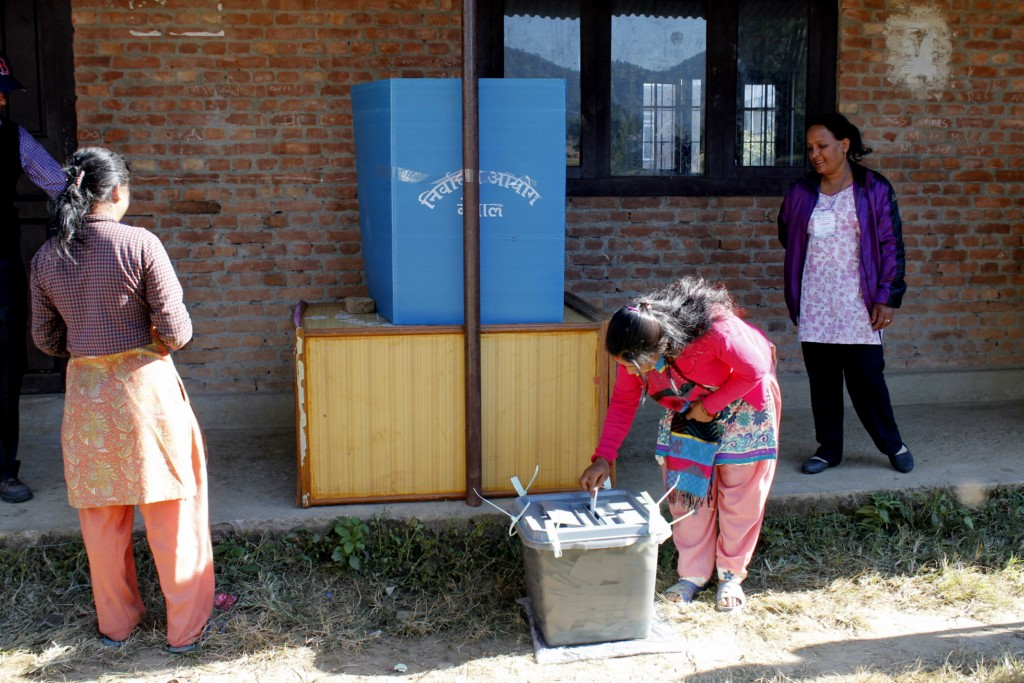

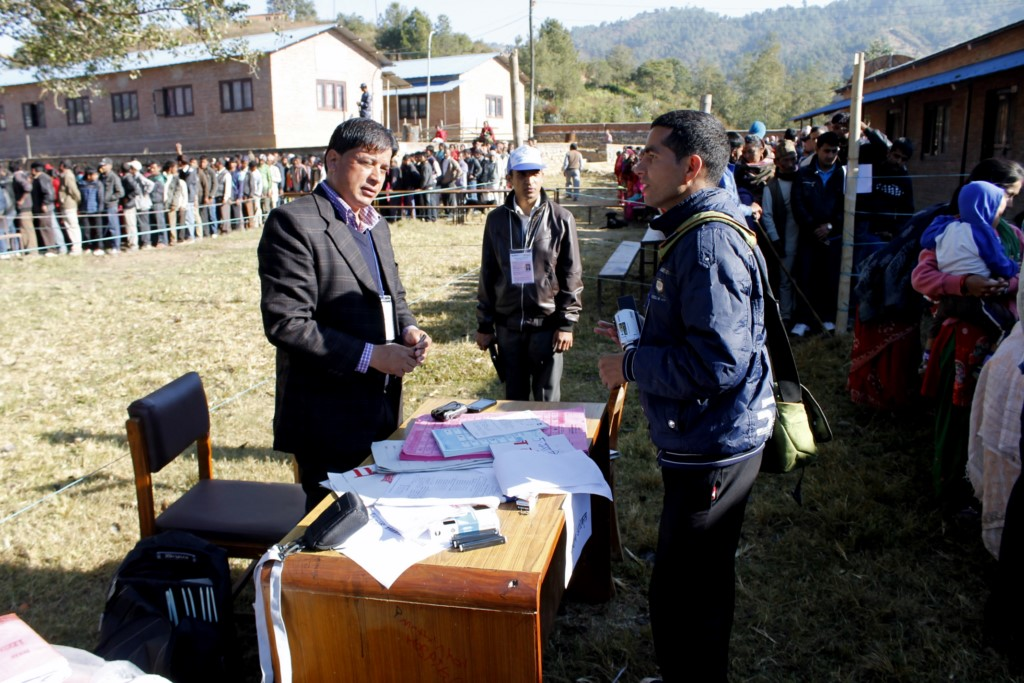

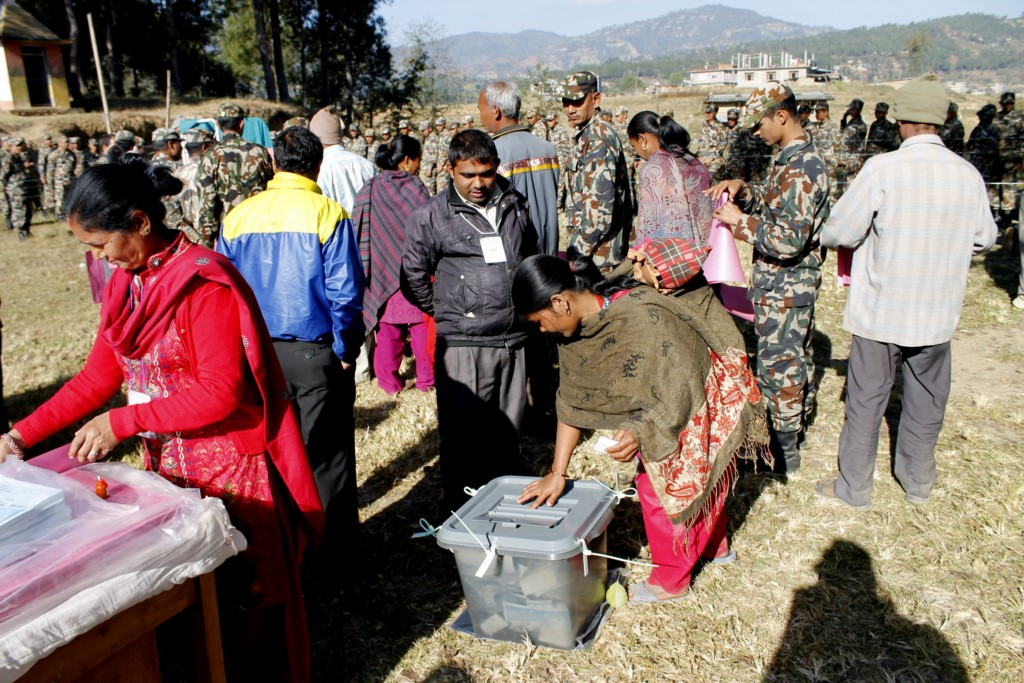

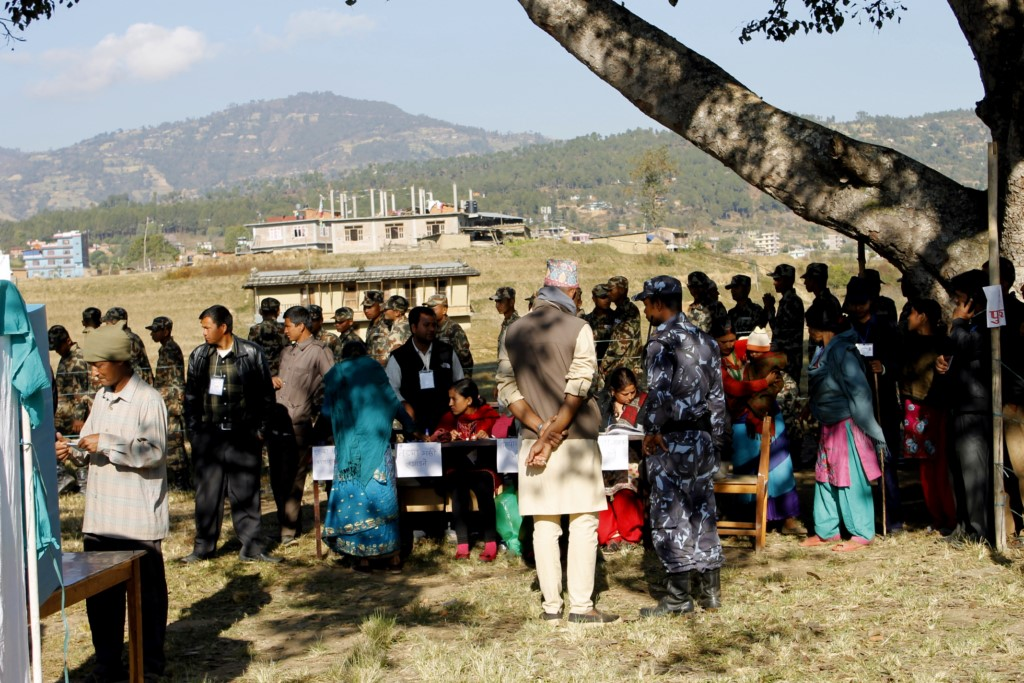

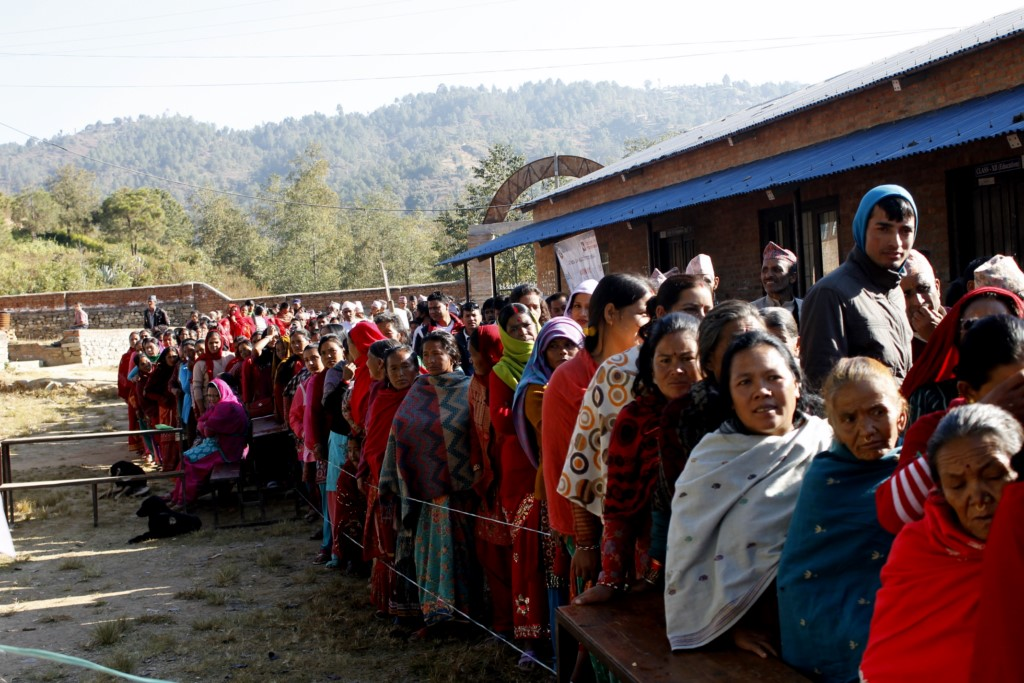

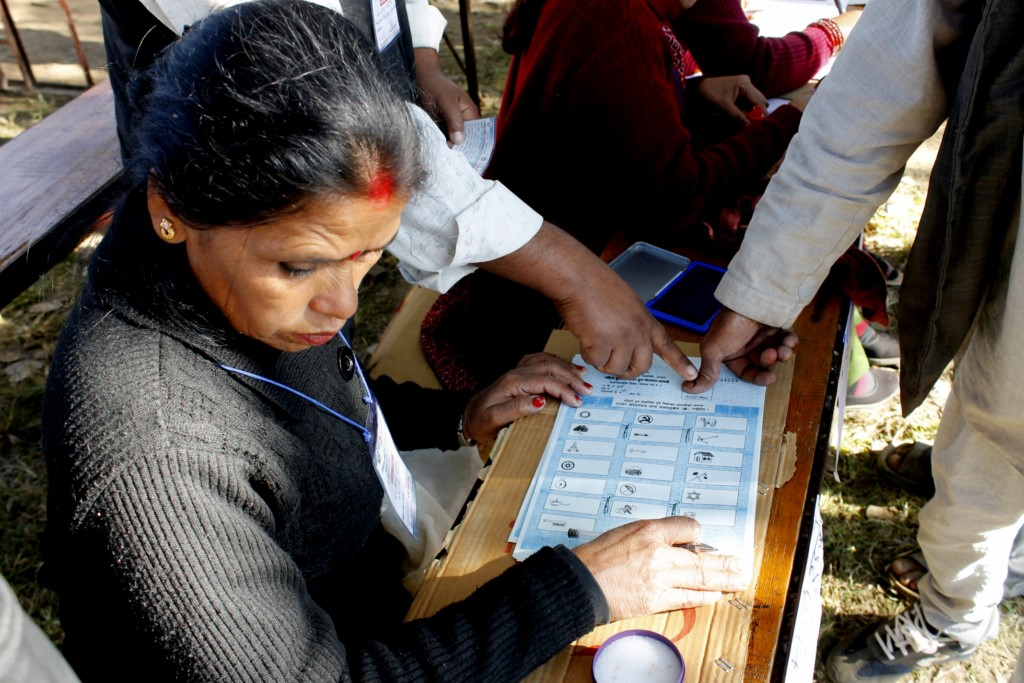

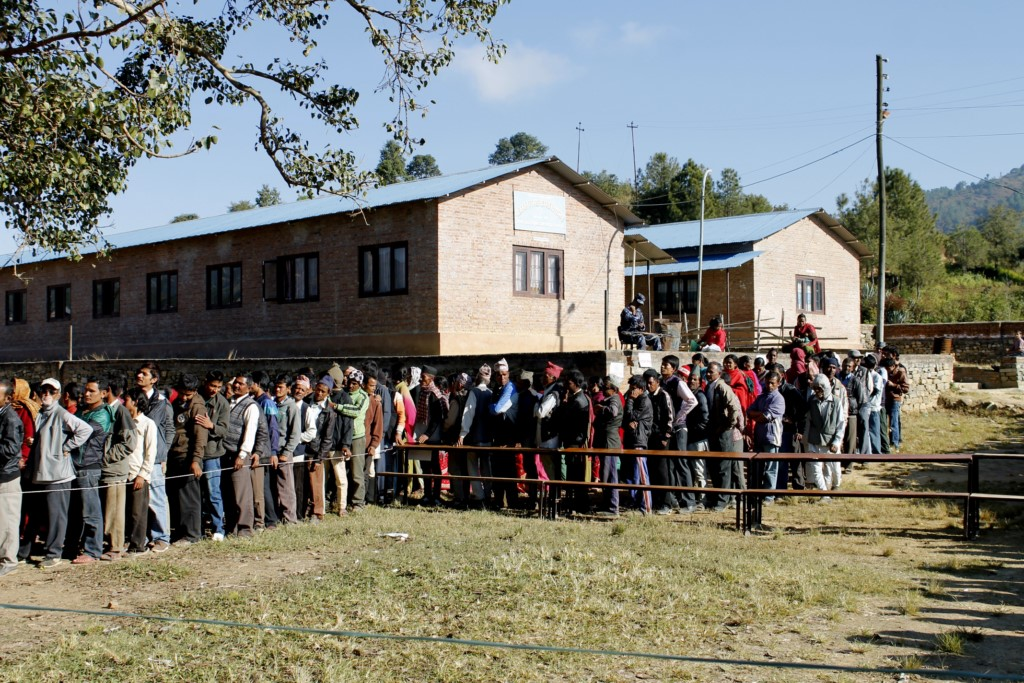

== See also ==
- 2nd Nepalese Constituent Assembly
- List of members elected in the 2013 Nepalese Constituent Assembly election
- Koirala cabinet, 2013
