= List of people from Pokhara =

Pokhara Lekhnath पोखरा लेखनाथ
- Metropolitan City
- Location in Nepal Pokhara Lekhnath (Nepal) Pokhara Lekhnath (Asia)
- Coordinates: 28°15′50″N 83°58′20″E
- Country: Nepal

This is a list of notable people from Pokhara Lekhnath Metropolitan City of Gandaki Province Nepal. It includes people who were born/raised in, lived in, or spent portions of their lives in Pokhara, or for whom Pokhara is a significant part of their identity. They are also known as Pokhareli People. The list is in alphabetical order.

== A ==
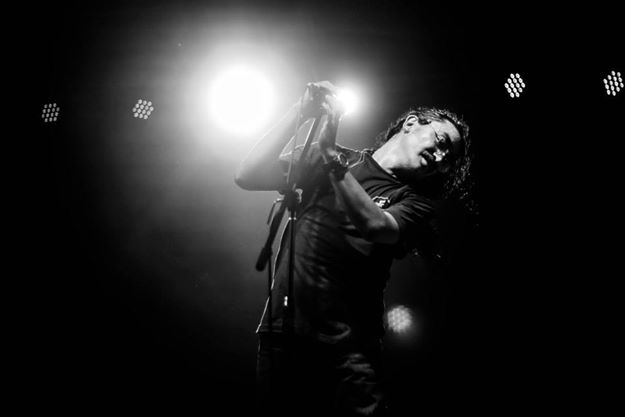
Amrit Gurung

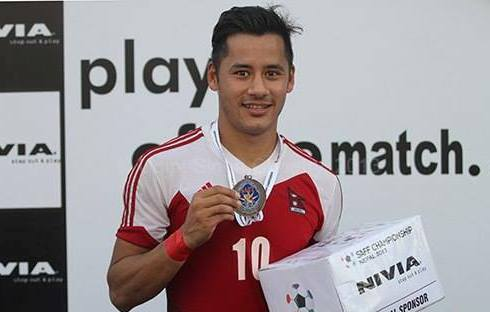
Anil Gurung

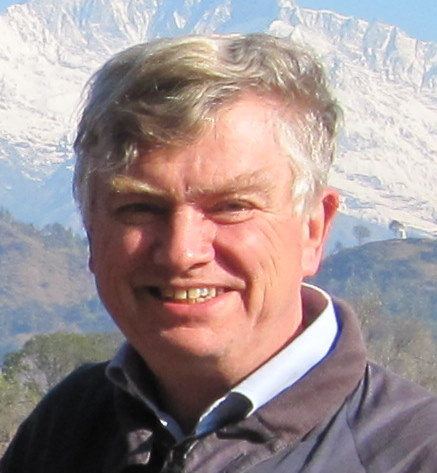
Andrew Briggs

- Ajit Bhandari - Nepalese footballer for Nepal Police Club and the Nepal national team.
- Ali Miya - poet
- Amrit Gurung – (active 1991–after 2013), singer and musician, founder of the band Nepathaya
- Anil Gurung - footballer
- Anup Baral - actor, writer, director
- Anup Kaphle - executive editor of Rest of World.
- Animesh Shahi - reality show contestant and 1st runner up of Himalaya Roadies
- Andrew Briggs - scientist
- Arun Thapa - singer and songwriter

== B ==
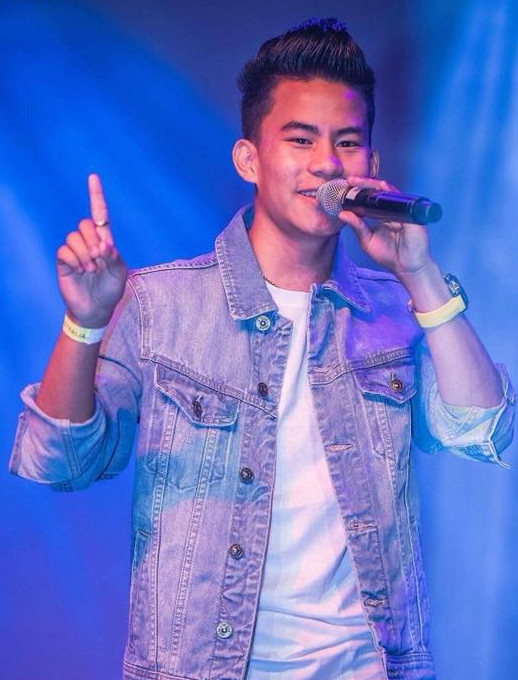
Buddha Lama

- Batsyayana - political cartoonist
- Belmaya Nepali - filmmaker
- Bimal Gharti Magar - footballer
- Bishnu Majhi - folk singer and is known as the "Vocal Queen of Nepali folk singer"
- Bishnu Shrestha - Nepalese Gurkha soldier in the Indian Army
- Buddha Lama - singer and winner of Nepal Idol Season 1

== C ==
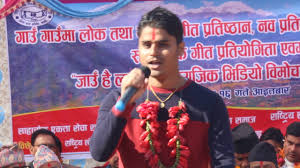
CD Vijaya Adhikari

- Chandra Gurung - environmentalist.
- Chandra Bahadur Gurung - politician
- Cool Pokhrel - singer and songwriter
- CD Vijaya Adhikari - singer and the winner of first The Voice of Nepal

== D ==
- Dambar Singh Kuwar - track and field athlete for 1988 Summer Olympics
- Dev Gurung - politician.
- Dhana Raj Acharya - politician, businessman and philanthropist.
- Dharmaraj Thapa - folk singer.
- Dharmendra Sewan - singer, songwriter, composer and performer.

== G ==
- Govinda Raj Joshi - politician
- Gyani Shah - is the first Nepalese lady to join Nepal Army
- Gyanu Rana - singer

== J ==
- Jamuna Gurung - entrepreneur.
- Jassita Gurung - actress.
- Jeewan Gurung - singer.
- Jhalak Man Gandarbha - folk singer.
- J. O. M. Roberts - one of the greatest Himalayan mountaineer-explorers of the twentieth century.
- Jagan Timilsina - trail runner, mountaineer and an outdoor instructor.

== K ==
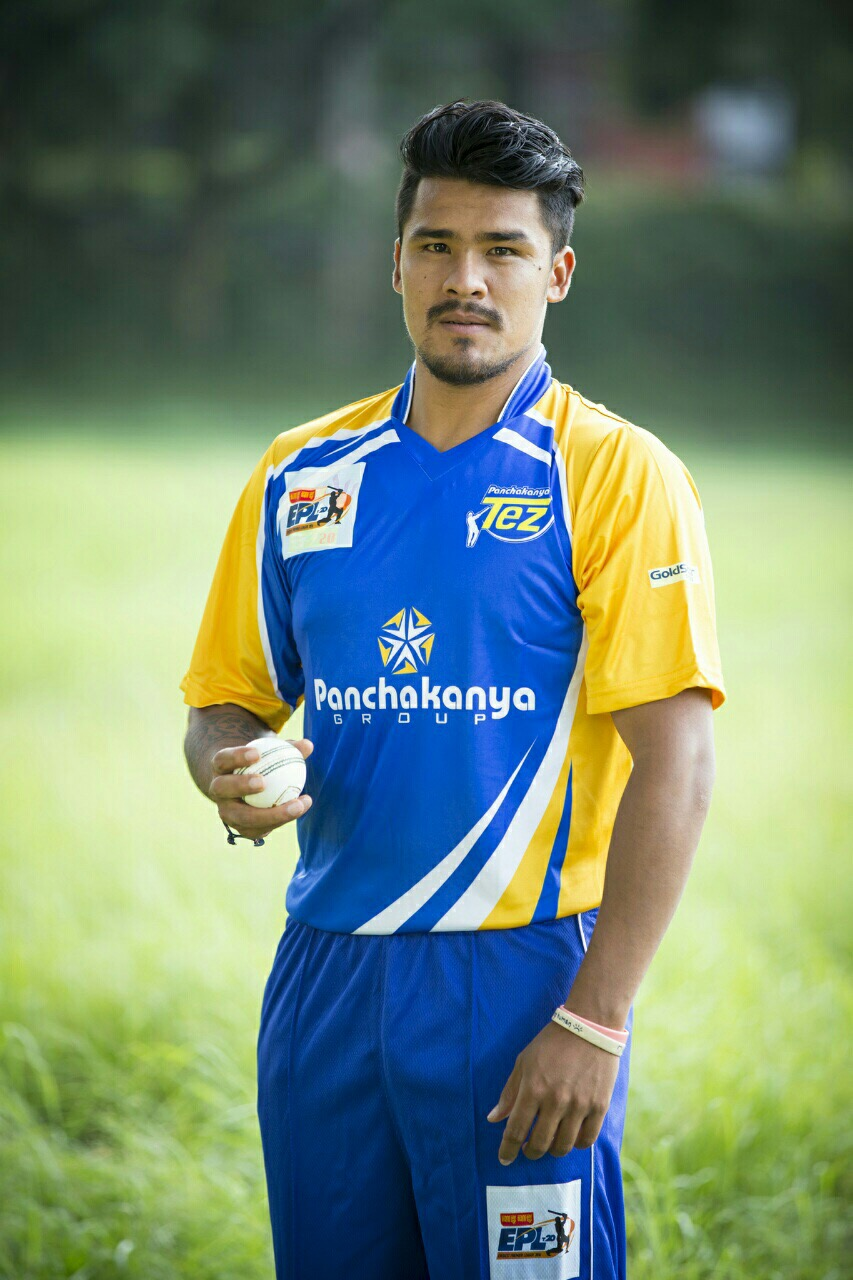
Karan KC

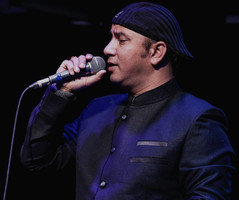
Karna Das

- Khagaraj Adhikari - politician, former home minister
- Kamal Thapa - politician
- Khadak Raj Poudel - politician, Minister of Culture, Tourism and Civil Aviation
- Karan KC - cricket and is the fastest bowler of Nepal.
- Karna Das is one of the most prominent Nepali singers living and performing today.
- Khadga Jeet Baral Magar - folk singer
- Khaptad Baba - spiritual saint.
- Khimlal Gautam - Nepali Mountaineer and Chief Survey Officer

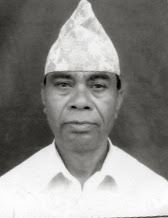
Kul Bahadur KC

- Kul Bahadur KC - Nepali poet, laureate
- Kiran Gurung - politician
- Krishna Bhattachan - Nepal's leading sociologists and indigenous activist.
- Kuber Singh Rana - was the Inspector General of the Nepal Police

== L ==
- Laure - rapper
- Lekhnath Paudyal - poet and writer

== M ==
- Marino Curnis - writer and poet
- Mukunda Sharan Upadhyaya - poet

== N ==
- Narayan Gopal - rominent popular singer and composer of Nepali music.
- Narayan Wagle - journalist and novelist
- Neelima Gurung - beauty queen

== P ==
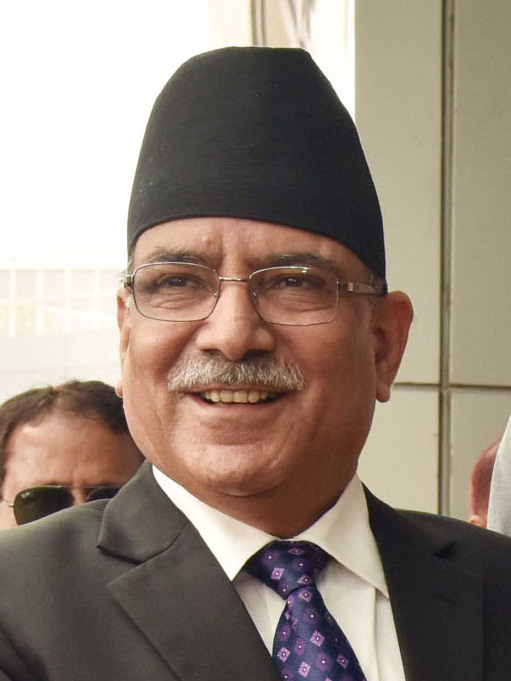
Pushpa Kamal Dahal

- Palten Gurung - politician
- Prakash Bahadur Gurung - politician
- Parivesh - folk singer
- Pratima Gurung - human rights activist
- Pushpa Kamal Dahal - Prime Minister of Nepal.

== R ==
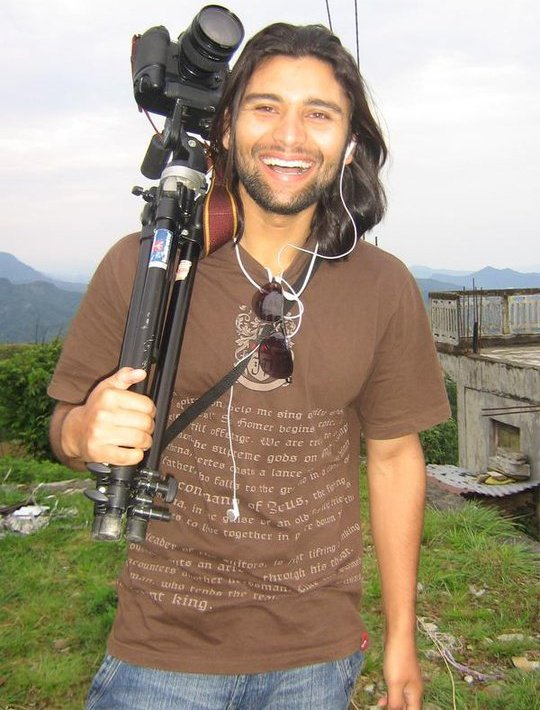
Raj Ballav Koirala

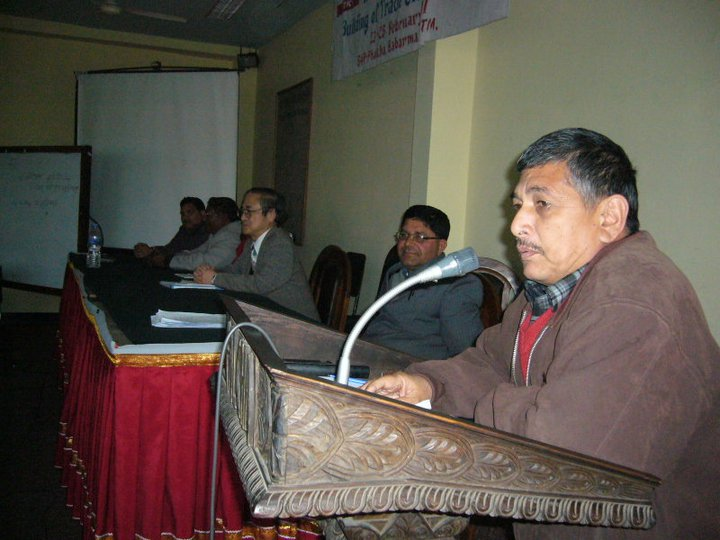
Ramjee Kunwar

- Rabindra Prasad Adhikari - politician
- Raj Ballav Koirala - actor
- Rajiv Gurung - politician.
- Ramjee Kunwar - politician
- Rishma Gurung - actress
- Robin Tamang - singer

== S ==
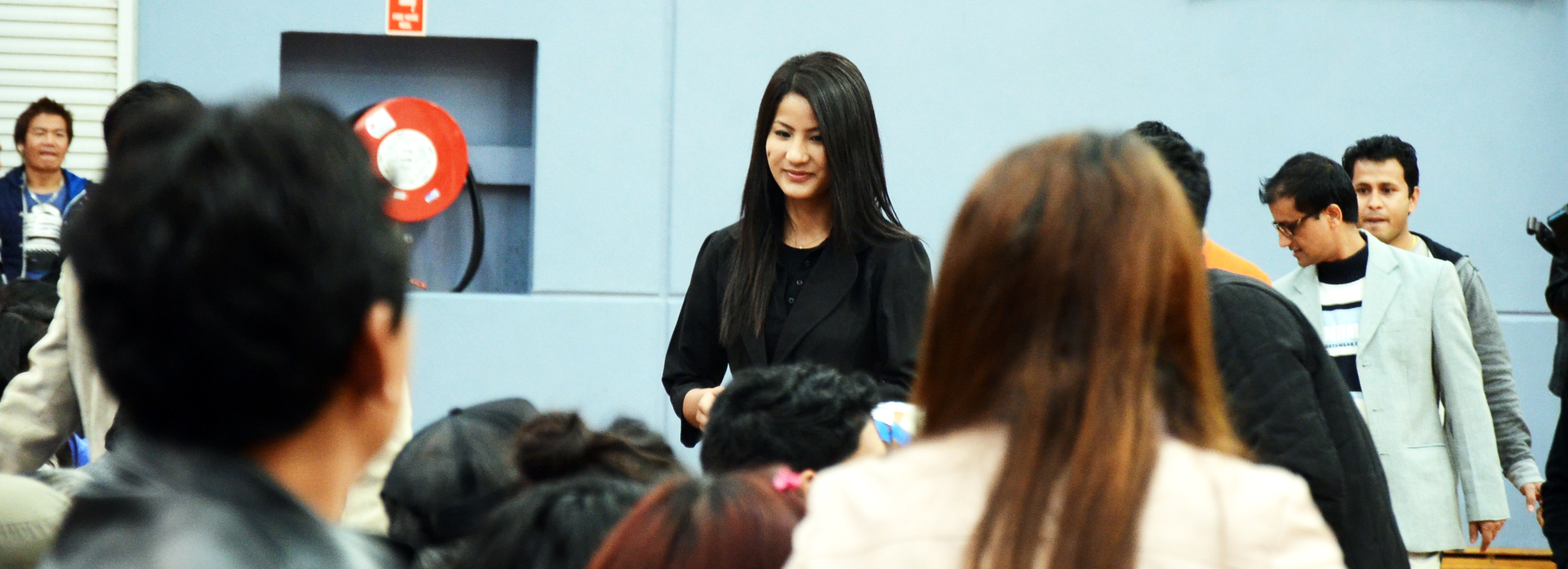
Sipora Gurung

- Sabindra Shrestha - footballer
- Samikshya Adhikari - singer
- Saraswati Pratikshya - writer
- Sarita Gurung - philanthropist and social worker
- Sarita Tiwari - poet, writer and advocate.
- Saru Bhakta - is a screenwriter of Madan Puraskar, the most prestigious literary honour in Nepal.
- Shesh Ghale - billionaire and businessman
- Shiva Shrestha - footballer
- Sharada Sharma - writer and poet.
- Siddharth Lama - actor
- Sipora Gurung - volleyball Player
- Sonie Rajbhandari - beauty queen
- Sundar Shrestha - singer
- Surya Bahadur KC - industrialist and a House of Representatives member.
- Sushil KC - footballer

== T ==
Tul Bahadur Pun

- Tul Bahadur Pun - was a Nepalese Gurkha recipient of the Victoria Cross, the highest award for gallantry

== U ==
- Upendra Kant Aryal - is 25th Chief of Nepal Police
- Usha Sherchan singer, lyricist and writer

== See also ==
- List of Nepalese people
- List of American Nepalese people
- List of British Nepalese people
- List of Indian Nepalese people
- List of people from Kathmandu
