= List of people from Jajarkot District =

A list of notable people from Jajarkot District, Nepal:

== Politics ==
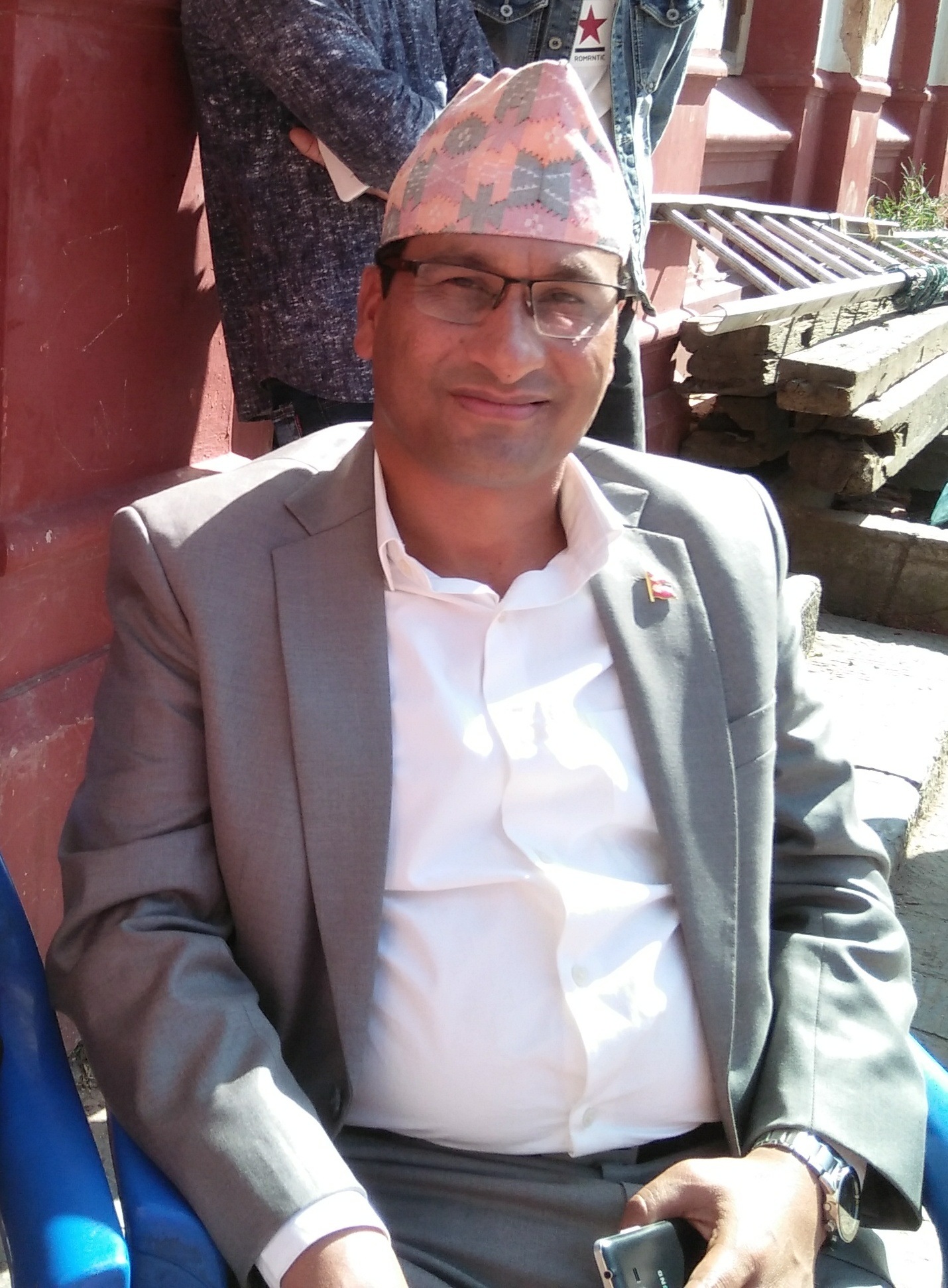
Shakti Bahadur Basnet

- Bhakta Bahadur Shah
- Chandra Prakash Gharti
- Kali Bahadur Malla
- Rajeev Bikram Shah
- Shakti Bahadur Basnet

== See also ==
- List of people from Pokhara
- List of people from Kathmandu
