= Great Himalaya Trail =

Long-distance hiking trail

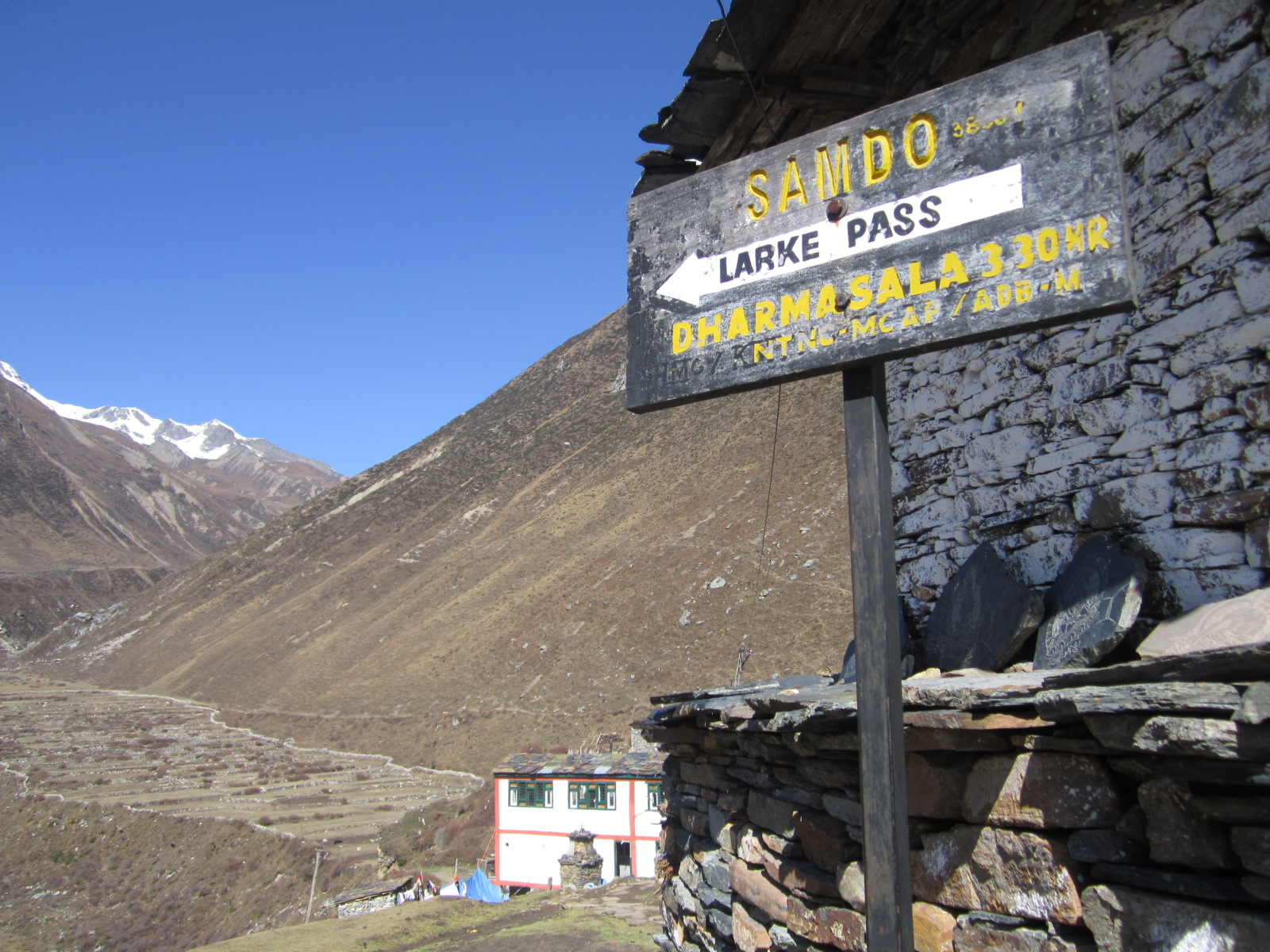
- The Great Himalaya Trail passing through Nepal
- Length: 4,500 kilometres (2,800 mi)
- Location: Himalayas: Pakistan, India, Nepal, Bhutan, Tibet
- Use: Hiking
- Highest point: Sherpani Col, Nepal, 6,160 m (20,210 ft)
- Difficulty: Strenuous
- Hazards: Severe weather, altitude sickness

The Great Himalaya Trail is a route across the Himalayas from east to west. The original concept was to establish a single long distance trekking trail from the east end to the west end of Nepal that includes a total of roughly 1,700 kilometres (1,100 mi) of path. There is a proposed trail of more than 4,500 kilometres (2,800 mi) stretching the length of the Greater Himalaya range from Nanga Parbat in Pakistan to Namche Barwa in Tibet thus passing through, India, Nepal, Bhutan and Tibet. Although an actual continuous route is currently only a concept, if completed it would be the longest and highest alpine hiking track in the world.

In November 2014, cross-country hikes of Nepal and Bhutan sections have been undertaken by a well-funded international non-governmental organization. It visits some of the most remote communities on earth, passing through the diverse landscapes including valleys and plateaus. Nepal's GHT has 10 sections comprising a network of upper and lower routes. The GHT (so-called upper and lower) can be roughly mapped out through existing routes, but these routes may not provide a continuous and uninterrupted trail.

== Introduction ==
The proposed trail links together a range of the less explored tourism destinations of Nepal's mountain region.

The trekking route crosses both well-known areas as well as other lesser-known sites that are very poor but have enormous tourism potential. The purpose of developing the trail was to promote socioeconomic benefits to mountain communities. The Great Himalaya Trail covers 16 districts, ranging from Dolpa that connects with the Tibetan plateau, to Darchula, which borders India. Trekking in Nepal is a major attraction for tourists, but popular destinations have been limited to the regions of Solukhumbu, Everest, Annapurna and Langtang.

The route offers diversity in terms of landscapes, flora and fauna, people and culture: from snow leopards to red pandas; from sub-tropical jungle to fragile high-altitude eco-systems; from the famous Sherpas, to Shamanism, to the ancient Bön Buddhist culture in Dolpa.

== History ==
The formation of a trail along the Greater Himalaya Range was precluded by access restrictions to certain areas in Nepal, Tibet and Bhutan requiring detours into the mid-hills away from the Greater Himalaya Range. These access restrictions were eased or lifted, and in 2002, with further restrictions being lifted in border areas of Nepal, it became feasible for the first time. Many expeditions have walked great distances across the Himalaya including:

=== 1980s ===
- 1981: Peter Hillary (son of Sir Edmund), Chhewang Tashi and Graeme Dingle walked from Sikkim to the Karakoram.
- 1981–82: Hugh Swift and Arlene Blum completed a nine-month traverse from Bhutan to Ladakh in India.
- 1983: British brothers Richard and Adrian Crane ran the Himalayas, from Kanchenjunga to Nanga Parbat in less than 100 days. The route required a large deviation from the Great Himalaya Range to cross the Nepal-India border.

=== 1990s ===
- 1990: Sorrell Wilby and Chris Ciantar made a traverse from Kashmir to Arunachal Pradesh.
- 1992: Brandon Wilson and Cheryl Wilson trekked 1,000 km on horseback from Lhasa, Tibet to Kathmandu, Nepal over 40 days. The Tibet border re-opened to travelers a day before their journey began. Their adventure/peace trek is documented in the book Yak Butter Blues.
- 1994: From October 21 to December 1, 1994, French runners Paul-Eric Bonneau and Bruno Poirier clocked up 2,100 km and 55,000 meters of altitude, crossing from East to West, from Pashupatinagar to Mahakali, traversing in sometimes difficult weather conditions.
- 1997: Alexandre Poussin and Sylvain Tesson walked a 5,000 km route from Bhutan to Tajikistan. They completed it in roughly six months.

=== 2000s ===
- 2003: Rosie Swale-Pope ran the length of Nepal in the mid-hills and Great Himalaya range with a support team, covering an estimated 1,700 km in 68 days to raise money for the Nepal Trust charity.
- 2007: Dr Gillian Holdsworth walked across Nepal with guide, Sonam Sherpa, to raise money for the Britain Nepal Medical Trust.
- 2008–09: Nepal's Great Himalaya Trail route was first walked over two seasons by a team led by Robin Boustead, who did five years of research treks before walking the route. The walk took a total of 162 days and is documented in a book of the same title. In acknowledgements to this book, the author mentions a team of three Sherpas named Pema Tshiri Sherpa, Lakpa Dendi Sherpa and Karma Sherpa who trekked with him "every step of the way."

=== 2010s ===
- 2010: Sean Burch, multiple Guinness World record holder, set an official world record by crossing an outlined idea of the Great Himalaya Trail in 49 days, 6 hours and 8 minutes.
- 2010: Three young travelers Dipesh Joshi, Surose Dangol, Raju Maharjan from a group named The Pathfinders completed Nepal's great Himalayan Trail section in one go.
- 2010: Katja Staartjes (first Dutch woman on Everest), together with Henk Wesselius and Chhiree Sherpa, started the Nepal Traverse. Their goal was to link the two ultimate ‘triple border passes’ (Tinkar La in the West and Jhingsang La in the North East) by a trail through Nepal. The trio failed, but restarted in spring 2011 and completed the trail – including the full GHT High Route - in four stages in 2013. Because of the extra loop in the undiscovered FarWest (to Hilsa), the total distance was 2000 kilometres. Katja wrote the (Dutch) book ‘Lopen over de grens’ (Walking along the border) about their Traverse.
- 2011: Justin Lichter and Shawn Forry were attempting to walk '8000 m East to 8000 m West' from Kanchenjunga to Nanga Parbat, they wrote a book after the walk.
- 2011: Sunil Tamang solo-hiked an outlined area of the Great Himalaya Trail from Kanchenjunga in the east to Rara Lake in western Nepal in 128 days on his own route starting on his 20th birthday making him the youngest person to hike the so-called trail.
- 2011: British ultra trail runner Lizzy Hawker attempted a solo cross of GHT but failed.
- 2012: Apa Sherpa, in April 2012, successfully led the very first expedition to complete the Great Himalaya Trail along with 3 companions, a 1,700-kilometre (1,050-mile) trek spanning the entire length of the Nepalese Himalayas. The Great Himalaya Trail is considered to be one of the world's most difficult treks. Apa Sherpa and his three companions set off in January on the Climate Smart Celebrity Trek, an expedition promoting tourism and highlighting the effects of climate change. They finished the trail in 99 days, 20 days ahead of schedule.
- 2012 : Saurav Dhakal, Storyteller from Story Cycle complete the Great Himalaya Trail along with Apa Sherpa in January–April 2012, 99 days a 1555 kilometre.
- 2012: Gerda Maria Pauler (partly accompanied by Temba Bhoti and a small group of porters) followed the Great Himalaya Trail High Route concept 1700 km across Nepal (Kanchenjunga BC to Hilsa) to raise funds for Autism Care Nepal.
- 2012: Paribesh Pradhan trekked a conceptual version of the Great Himalaya Trail from Kanchenjunga to Darchula in 98 days as a part of his project "The Great Himalaya Trail - My Climate Initiative".
- 2014: John Fiddler, Kathleen Egan, and Seth Wolpin traversed the proposed high route of the GHT and became the first team to cross all five technical passes without porter support. They trekked from Taplejung to Hilsa and finished in 87 days. Kathleen became the first woman to hike the high route self-supported.
- 2017: The Great Himal Race, a trail race, largely following the Great Himalaya Trail from near Kanchenjunga North Base Camp to the foot of Mount Kailash, was organized by French organisation Les Chevaliers du Vent. It was won by Jagan Timilsina in 45 days (315 h 37 m).

=== 2020s ===
- 2022: Mangal Krishna Lama, a Nepali mountain biker and adventurer, traversed the upper route of the Great Himalaya Trail from Kangchenjunga Base Camp to Hilsa in Humla District on a solo mountain biking expedition, named GHT on Wheels, in 88 days from April–July 2022, becoming the first person to solo-ride across the GHT.
- 2023: Abdolreza Kouhpayeh from Iran (as the first Asian-except Nepalis) accompanied by Marc Niehaus from Switzerland trekked the whole Great Himalaya Trail, high route(1,600 km) that includes all high passes in 100 days.(partly accompanied by Temba Bhoti and Nima Bhoti from Snow dragons Nepal Trek)
- 2024: The 2nd edition of the “Great Himal Race”, following largely the “Great Himalaya Trail” from Hilsa village at Nepali Chinese border in the west to the site of Lhonak, near Kangchenjunga North Base Camp in the east. Its route stretched for 1.602 km and 90.310m of elevation gain and was organized by the French club “Chevaliers du Vent”. The race took place in 52 consecutive daily stages. Winner in men category was Jules-Henri Gabioud (SUI) in 49 days (racing time 264h & 31m) and Asimina Inglezou (GRE) in women category in 52 days (racing time 367h & 35m). For Ms Inglezou, her performance of 52d,06h,23m was recognized by Guinness World Records Organization as “the fastest female completion of the Great Himalaya Trail”, eastward direction.

== Sections ==
=== Bhutan ===
Bhutan is organised into different routes that traverse the country. Robin Boustead summarises the route as: "After arriving in Paro, head to Shana and Drugyal Dzong and the beginning of the Jhomolhari Trek. Continue around over the Nyele Pass to join and then follow the Ghasa Hot Springs trail to Thanza and the Snowman Trek. From the high lakes descend to Ungar on the Gankar Punsum route before following the Rhodang La Trek to Trashi Yangtse in the east. This route takes about 40 days depending on fitness."

=== Nepal ===
Robin Boustead, Pema Tsiring Sherpa, Lakpa Sherpa and Karma Sherpa have claimed to have hiked a trail that links each himal from Kanchenjunga to Api. The upper route passes from East to West through established trekking areas of Kanchenjunga to Makalu Barun, Solukhumbu, Rolwaling Himal, Helambu, Langtang, Ganesh Himal, Manaslu, Annapurna, Dolpa, Rara Lake and Humla finishing on the Tibetan border at Hilsa.

==== Kanchenjunga ====
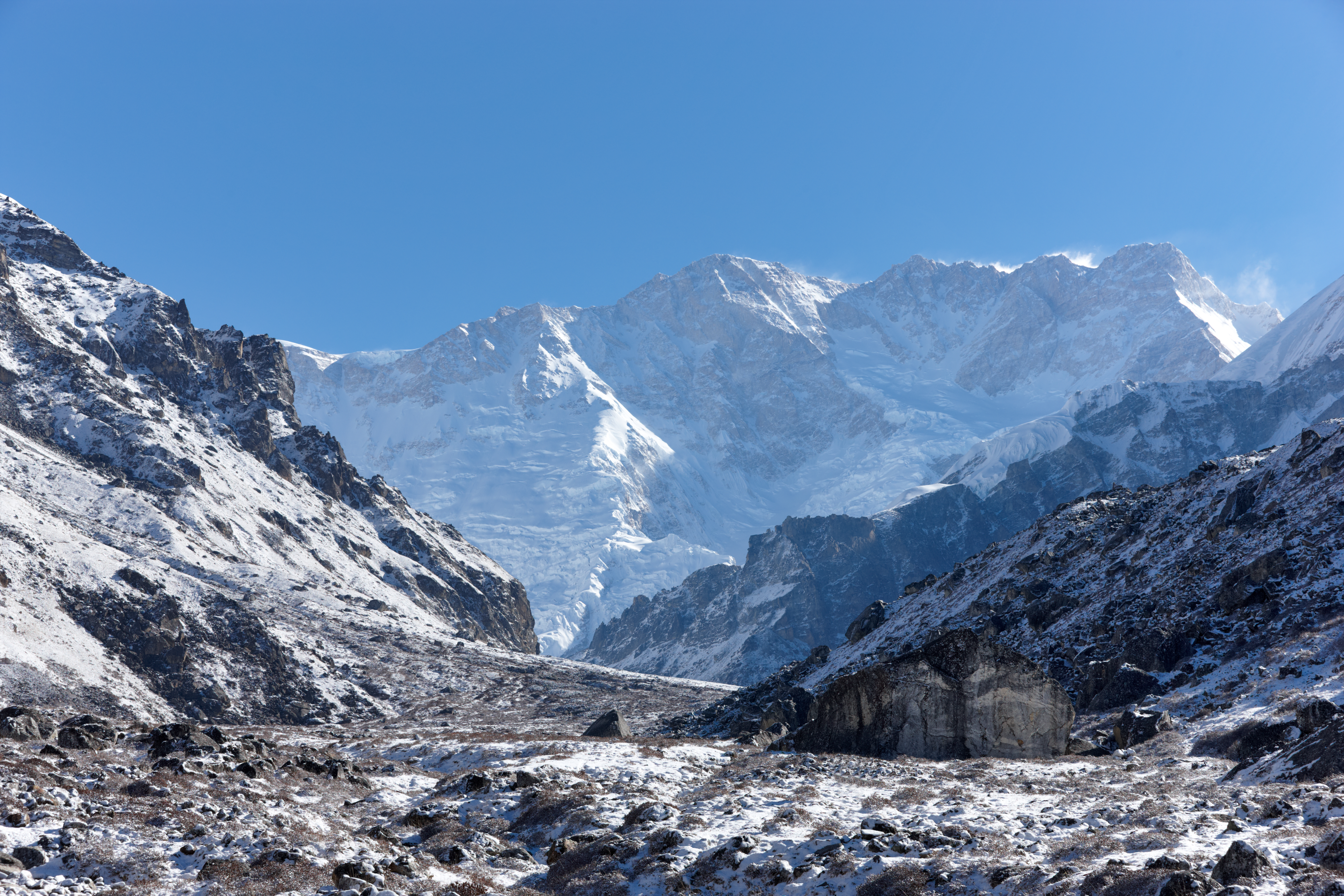
Kanchenjunga

Kanchenjunga, at 8,586 metres (28,169 ft) is the world's third highest mountain and lies on the border with Sikkim. Eastern Nepal is generally more developed than western Nepal and more prosperous. This is due in part to the more favourable climate with its higher rainfall, the employment of Rai and Limbu people in the Gorkha regiments and their income. Rugged terrain however means that mountain areas are especially remote.

==== Makalu Barun ====
The region is named after Mt Makalu, which at 8,463 metres (27,766 ft) is the world's fifth highest mountain. It is home to more than 3000 species of flowering plants, including 25 species of rhododendron and hundreds of varieties of orchids.

==== Everest and Rolwaling ====
Everest is also known as Sagarmatha in Nepal and Chomolungma in Tibet; the Everest region is known locally as the Khumbu. Its home to three of the highest peaks in the world: Everest 8,848 metres (29,029 ft); Lhotse, fourth highest at 8,516 metres (27,940 ft); and Cho Oyu, sixth highest at 8,201 metres (26,906 ft).

Rolwaling Himal is home to Tamang, Sherpa, eastern Gurung and the indigenous Thami people. It has no formally protected areas as it is rich in wildlife including red panda, black bear and leopard cat.

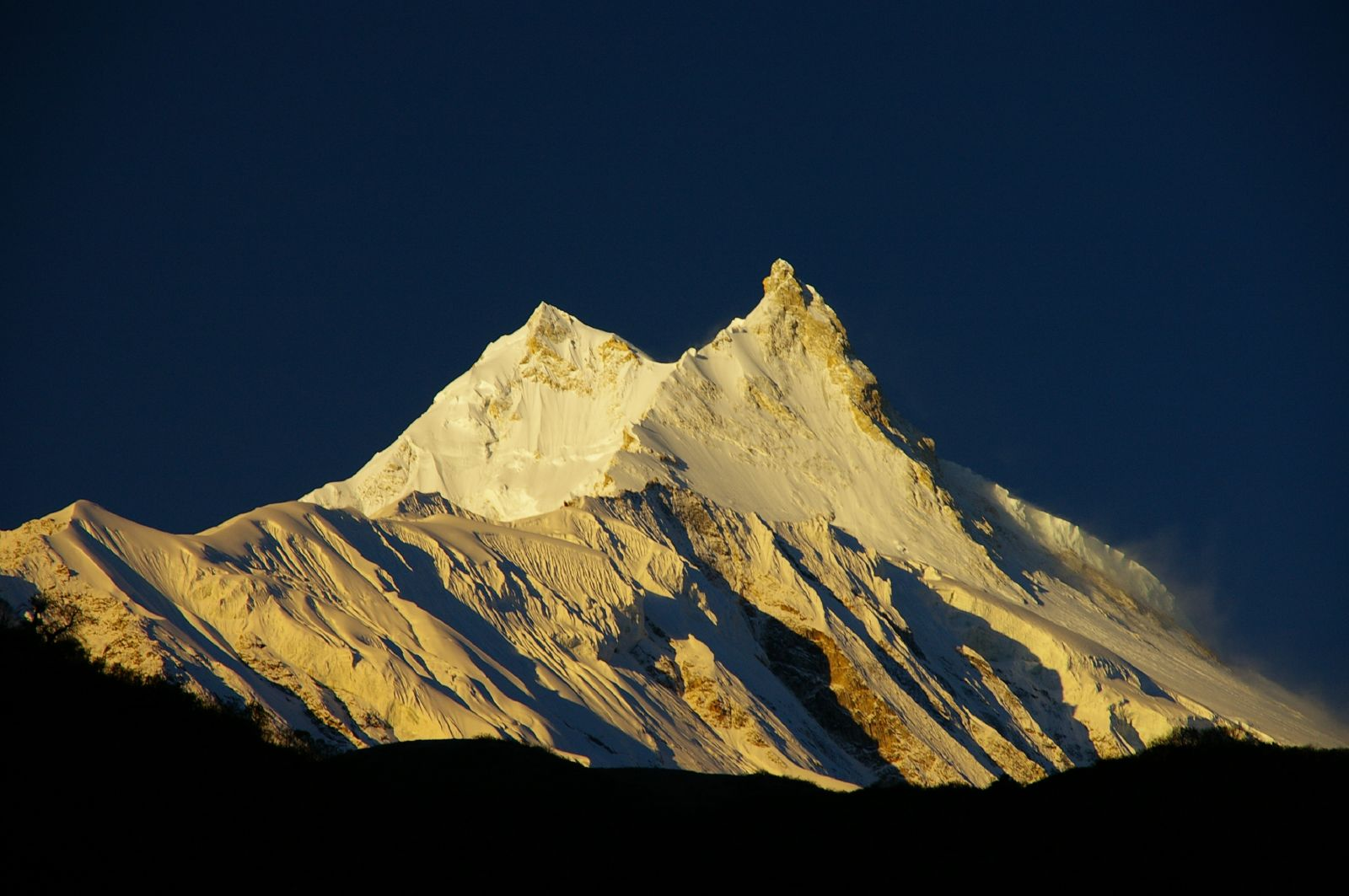
Sunrise, Manaslu

==== Rara and Jumla ====
This trail starts from Jumla Bazar and heads to the Mugu district. It takes 2 days to complete the trail. Jumla Bazar is 2300 m to Nauri-ghat. Daphe Lekh is about 4500 m high. The climb is very treacherous as you can only climb 200 meters because of the very rough terrain. Due to the conditions, it is not suitable for people who have altitude sickness while climbing this. From then it is all downhill up to Nauri Ghat. From Nauri Ghat, it is a 2-hour descend to the Mugu district. Along the way, there is a village called Bhulbhele which is around 7 hours from Nauri Ghat where one can choose to go left to reach Rara lake or walk to Gamgadi which is part of Mugu district. Both take 4 hours to reach.

== Routes ==
Trekkers can choose between two routes: the high route (extreme route) and the low route (cultural route).

=== High route ===
Nepal's high route starts north of the Kanchenjunga Base Camp and ends in Hilsa at Nepal's Tibetan border in the Western district of Humla. The trail stretches over a distance of about 1,700 km and passes through high altitude mountain landscapes, visiting some of the most remote villages on earth where life remains as it was centuries back.

Trekking along the GHT high route crosses over high altitudes up to 6,146 m and the whole trek takes about 150 days. Proper trekking gear and mountaineering equipment is needed and it should be for the physically fit. For safety, a local mountain guide follows travellers especially in high altitudes.

Running a total of 1,504 km in a bit more than 24 days, the South African trail runners Ryan Sandes and Ryno Griesel set a new fastest known time during March 2018 for the GHT.

=== Low route ===
This route is shorter than the high route, the GHT low route stretches over a distance of 1,500 km and the whole trek will roughly take around 100 days. The GHT low route goes through the country's mid hills with an average altitude of 2,000 metres (6,600 ft). However, there are many passes to cross with the highest being the Jang La at 4,519 metres (14,826 ft) between Dhorpatan and Dolpa in West-Nepal.

Trekking along GHT low route means walking through forests, pastures, green rice terraces and fertile agricultural land, providing the basis for Nepal's rich culture and civilization. There are a lot of local settlements of many different cultural groups.

== Bicycle ==
The Great Himalaya Trail on Wheels (GHT on Wheels) is the first successful solo-mountain biking expedition on the upper (high) route of the Great Himalaya Trail (GHT) in Nepal, accomplished by Nepali mountain biker and adventurer, Mangal Krishna Lama, who is also a guide and former National athlete. The upper route of the GHT presents a unique set of physical and mental challenges, with over 90,000 m of elevation gain and loss, over 22 passes above 5000 m, and the highest point reached at 6158 m.

At the end of March 2022, Mangal embarked on this daring journey from the Eastern point of the GHT upper route, Kangchenjunga Base Camp, reaching the Western point of Hilsa in Humla District in a total of 88 riding days to complete the GHT on Wheels challenge, setting several high altitude mountain biking records apart from the major accomplishment of traversing the GHT on a mountain bike solo for the first time. Mangal's journey recorded by Garmin GPS device is available on the official GHT on Wheels website, where a summary of the GPS tracks is also available, as well as on the Garmin website.

The accomplishment was covered in several national media outlets in Nepal including Nepali Times,The Annapurna Express, Online Khabar, and Kantipur Publications, but is yet to gain any international coverage in major outlets.

In addition to being a personal challenge and dream project, the GHT on Wheels project aimed to promote education, raise awareness about lesser-known areas of Nepal for tourism, and raise local incomes.
