= Phadindra Devkota =

Nepalese politician

Honourable Phadindra Devkota
- फडिन्द्र देवकोटा

Member of Parliament for Pragatisheel Loktantrik Party
- Incumbent
- Assumed office 2022

Personal details
- Party: Pragatisheel Loktantrik Party
- Other political affiliations: Pragatisheel Loktantrik Party

Phadindta Devkota is a Nepalese politician, belonging to the Pragatisheel Loktantrik Party He is currently serving as a member of the 2nd Federal Parliament of Nepal. In the 2022 Nepalese general election he was elected as a representative of people in Gandaki assembly
