= Ramesh Prasad Yadav =

Ramesh Prasad Yadav may refer to:

- Ramesh Prasad Yadav (Indian politician)
- Ramesh Prasad Yadav (Nepalese politician)
