= Umrawati Devi Yadav =

Nepalese politician

Honourable Umrawati Devi Yadav

Member of Parliament, Pratinidhi Sabha for CPN (Maoist Centre)-Nepal Socialist Party (Single Election Symbol)
- Incumbent
- Assumed office 2022

Personal details
- Party: Nepal Socialist Party
- Other party: CPN (Maoist Centre)
- Spouse: Ramesh Prasad Yadav
- Parents: Mahant (father); Radhika (mother)

Umrawati Devi Yadav is a Nepalese politician, belonging to the Nepal Socialist Party. She is currently a member of the 2nd Federal Parliament of Nepal. In the 2022 Nepalese general election she was elected as a proportional representative under the Madhesi people category from the combined party list of CPN (Maoist Centre) Party and Nepal Socialist Party.
