= Bhakta Bahadur Shah =

Nepalese politician

- भक्त बहादुर शाह

Deputy chairman of Nepal Socialist Party
- Incumbent
- Assumed office 28 July 2022
- Preceded by: Position established

Member of Constituent Assembly
- In office 2013–2017
- Constituency: Jajarkot-2

Personal details
- Party: Pragatisheel Loktantrik Party

Bhakta Bahadur Shah (Nepali: भक्त बहादुर शाह) is a Nepalese politician, belonging to the Pragatisheel Loktantrik Party. He was the deputy chairman of the NSP. In the 2008 Constituent Assembly election, he was elected from the Jajarkot-2 constituency, receiving 11,938 votes.

== See also ==
- Nepal Socialist Party
