= Santosh Pariyar =

Nepalese politician

Honourable Santosh Pariyar
- सन्तोष परियार
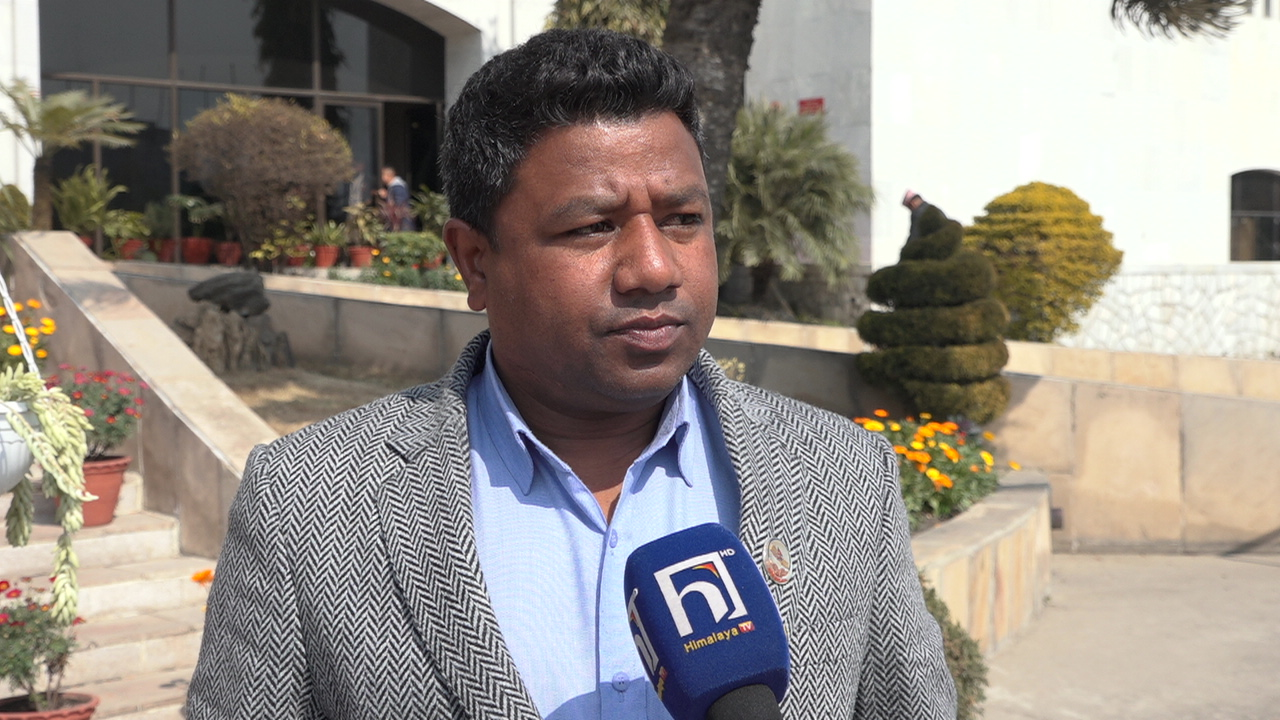

Member of Parliament, Pratinidhi Sabha
- Incumbent
- Assumed office 22 December 2022
- President: Ram Chandra Poudel

Personal details
- Party: Pragatisheel Loktantrik Party
- Other party: Rastriya Swatantra Party
- Parents: Ram Bahadur (father); Jhukka (mother)

Santosh Pariyar is a Nepalese politician and former member of the Pratinidhi Sabha. He was formerly a member of the Rastriya Swatantra Party, but switched membership to the Pragatisheel Loktantrik Party politician. On the other hand, it was reported that Pariyar was in talk with the Janardan Sharma led Progressive Campaign, Nepal to form Progressive Democratic Party.

He is also a member of the 2nd Federal Parliament of Nepal also served as a chief whip of the Rastriya Swatantra Party. In the 2022 Nepalese general election he was elected as a proportional representative from the Dalit people category.

== See also ==
- Pragatisheel Loktantrik Party
