= List of people from Kathmandu =

A list of notable people from Kathmandu, Nepal:

== Politics ==
- Gunakamadeva - founder of the city
- Mahendra of Nepal
- Dhyan Govinda Ranjit
- Dilli Raman Regmi
- Birendra Shah
- Shukraraj Shastri - martyr of Nepal
- Gangalal Shrestha - martyr of Nepal
- Pushpa Lal Shrestha
- Ganesh Man Singh - supremo leader of Nepal and commander of the 1990s people's movement
- Prakash Man Singh

== Medicine ==
- Bhagawan Koirala - A cardiac surgeon, author and social worker.
- Bhola Rijal - A gynaecologist, artist and social worker.

== Sports ==
- Baikuntha Manandhar

== Entertainment ==
- Hari Bansha Acharya
- Narayan Gopal - Emperor of Voice
- Manisha Koirala - Bollywood actress
- Dilkrishna Shrestha - actor, film producer
- Madan Krishna Shrestha

== Literature ==
- Nisthananda Bajracharya - one of the four main writers during Nepal Bhasa renaissance
- Bhawani Bhikshu - the greatest poet of Nepal
- Chittadhar Hridaya - modern poet
- Gopal Prasad Rimal

== See also ==
- List of people from Pokhara
