= Chup Laag =

Studio album by Laure
- Released: 2017
- Studio: 2016
- Genre: Hip hop
- Label: The Bad Kompany

Chup Laag is the incomplete studio album released by Nepalese rapper Laure.This is the debut album by Laure with The Bad Kompany.

== Track listing ==
No.	Title	Singer(s)	Length
1.	"Banawati"	Laure	3:16
2.	"Sathi Ho"	Laure	4:04
3.	"Nephop Ko Bato"	Laure	4:00
4.	"Chup Laag"	Laure, Uniq Poet	4:19

== Writing and recording ==
Over a year ago Laure released a music video for Banawati for this album and he started teasing everyone in 2017 and released two of his music videos on YouTube but other music is yet to come.

== Charts ==
Album

Chart	Peak position	Notes
Hits FM 91.2	7	
Ekantipur Charts	9	

Songs in the Album

Chart	Peak position	Song
Hits FM 91.2	1	Banawati
Hits FM 91.2	6	Sathi Ho
Hits FM 91.2	1	Nephop Ko Bato
Ekantipur Charts	1	Banawati
Ekantipur Charts	8	Sathi Ho
Ekantipur Charts	1	Nephop Ko Bato

== Members ==
- Laure - vocals
- Uniq Poet - vocals
