= Krishna Bhattachan =

Nepalese sociologist

- Born: 22 August 1953 (age 73); Pokhara, Kaski, Nepal
- Education: University of California, Berkeley, PhD; Banaras Hindu University, MA; Tribhuvan University, BA
- Occupation: Sociologist
- Website: www.cdsatu.edu.np

Krishna Bhattchan a Nepali sociologist and Indigenous activist. He is a Professor of Sociology at the Central Department of Sociology and Anthropology at the Tribhuvan University. He received his graduate degree in sociology from Banaras Hindu University. He received his doctorate from the University of California, Berkeley.

He is the secretary of the Indigenous Nationalities Mega Front. He is the author of numerous publication on ethnic politics in Nepal, including Minorities and Indigenous Peoples of Nepal (NCARD 2008) He advocates for issues regarding Indigenous peoples of Nepal.

== Publications ==
=== Books ===
- 2008. Nepalma Jatiya Bibhed (Caste Based Discrimination in Nepal), by Tej Sunar and Yasso Kanti Bhattachan. 2008. Kathmandu: DNF-Nepal, NNDSWO, Kathmandu, IIDS, Delhi and IDSN, Copenhagen.
- 2001. Tamang Healing in the Himalaya. The Tamang Healing Knowledge and the Development Interventions in and Around Langtang National park of Central Nepal, by Parshuram Tamang and Gyan Lal Shrestha. Kathmandu: Milijuli Nepal.

=== Edited volumes ===
- 2005. Culture and Religious Diversity: Dialogue and Development edited by Bhattachan, Krishna, R. D. Bajracharya, D. R. Dahal and P. K. Khatry. UNESCO Kathamndu Series of Moographs and Working Papers: No 6. Kathmandu: UNESCO.
- 2001. NGO, Civil Society and Government in Nepal: Critical Examination of Their Roles and Responsibilities, edited by Bhattachan, Krishna, Dev Raj Dahal, Sheetal Rana, Jyoti Gyawali, Min B. Basnet, Kashi Ram Bhusal and Ram Raj Pokharel. Kathmandu: Central Department of Sociology and Anthropology, Tribhuvan University in cooperation with Friedrich-Ebert-Stiftung.
- 2001. Gender and Democracy, edited by Bhattachan, Krishna and Laxmi Keshari Manandhar. Kathmandu: Central Department of Home Science—Women's Studies Program, Trbhuvan University in cooperation with Friedrich-Ebert-Stiftung.
- 1999. Reasserting Indigenous Knowledge Systems, edited by Bhattachan, Krishna and Parshuram Tamang). Kathmandu: NEFEN.
- 1997. Developmental Practices in Nepal, edited by Bhattachan, Krishna and Chaitannya Mishra. Central Department of Sociology and Anthropology, Tribhuvan University, Kathmandu in cooperation with Friedrich Ebert Stiftung (FES), Nepal Office, Kathmandu.

=== Book chapters ===
- 2013. Ethnopolitics and Ethnodevelopment: An Emerging Paradigm in Nepal- with a Postscript, in Mahendra Lawoti and Susan Hangen (eds). Nationalism and Ethnic Conflict in Nepal: Identities and Mobilization after 1990. pp 35–57. Routledge: London and New York
