= Tandav (film) =

- Directed by: Murray Kerr
- Produced by: Mohaan Dotel
- Starring: Namrata Shrestha; Anup Baral; Alan Gurung; Bipin Karki; Laure (Nepalese rapper)
- Cinematography: Narendra Mainali
- Edited by: Banish Shah
- Production company: Apple Production Film
- Release date: 22 August 2014 (Nepal)
- Running time: 98 minutes
- Country: Nepal
- Language: Nepali

Tandav is the second feature film produced by Mohaan Dotel and also the second by director Murray Kerr. The film marks the debut of the rap singer Aashish Rana (Laure) in the Nepali film industry and features Namrata Shrestha, Anup Baral, Alan Gurung, and Beepin Karki. The film was released on August 22, 2014.

== Plot ==
The film starts with a deal of smugglers smuggling guns and ammunition at the border of India and Nepal. Ganesh is the leader of running all these smuggling activities. Amrit (Asish Rana) also works under Ganesh but he tries to help Indian police to catch the Ganesh and stop his on going smuggling activities, finding this Ganesh tries to kill Amrit but Amrit flies away and reach to Paradise guest house where he meets his childhood friend Maya (Namrata Shrestha) and Amir (Alan Gurung). Ganesh also comes with his people to Paradise guest house to kill Amrit. After finding Amir is Police he tries to escape away from guest house but Amir doesn't allow him to go. Few minutes later all the clients along with Amrit, Maya and Amir trapped inside house and surrounded by people of Ganesh. Amrit along with other members of hotel fires to the ganesh and a disastrous war begins. At last, Amrit dies by killing Ganesh with a bomb blast.

== Cast ==
- Aashish Rana as Amrit
- Namrata Shrestha as Maya
- Anup Baral as Ganesh
- Alan Gurung as Amir
- Bipin Karki as Pratik
- Bisharad Basnet as Mote

== Soundtrack ==
No.	Title	Singer(s)	Length
1.	"Yuddha"	Laure (Nepalese rapper)	3:20
2.	"Tararam Poop"	Ram Chandra Kafle	2:30
3.	"Tandav Ost"	Laure (Nepalese rapper)	3:50

== See also ==
- List of Nepalese films
- Classic (2016 film)
