= Nepal Socialist Party =

Political party in Nepal

Socialist Party of Nepal नेपाल समाजवादी पार्टी
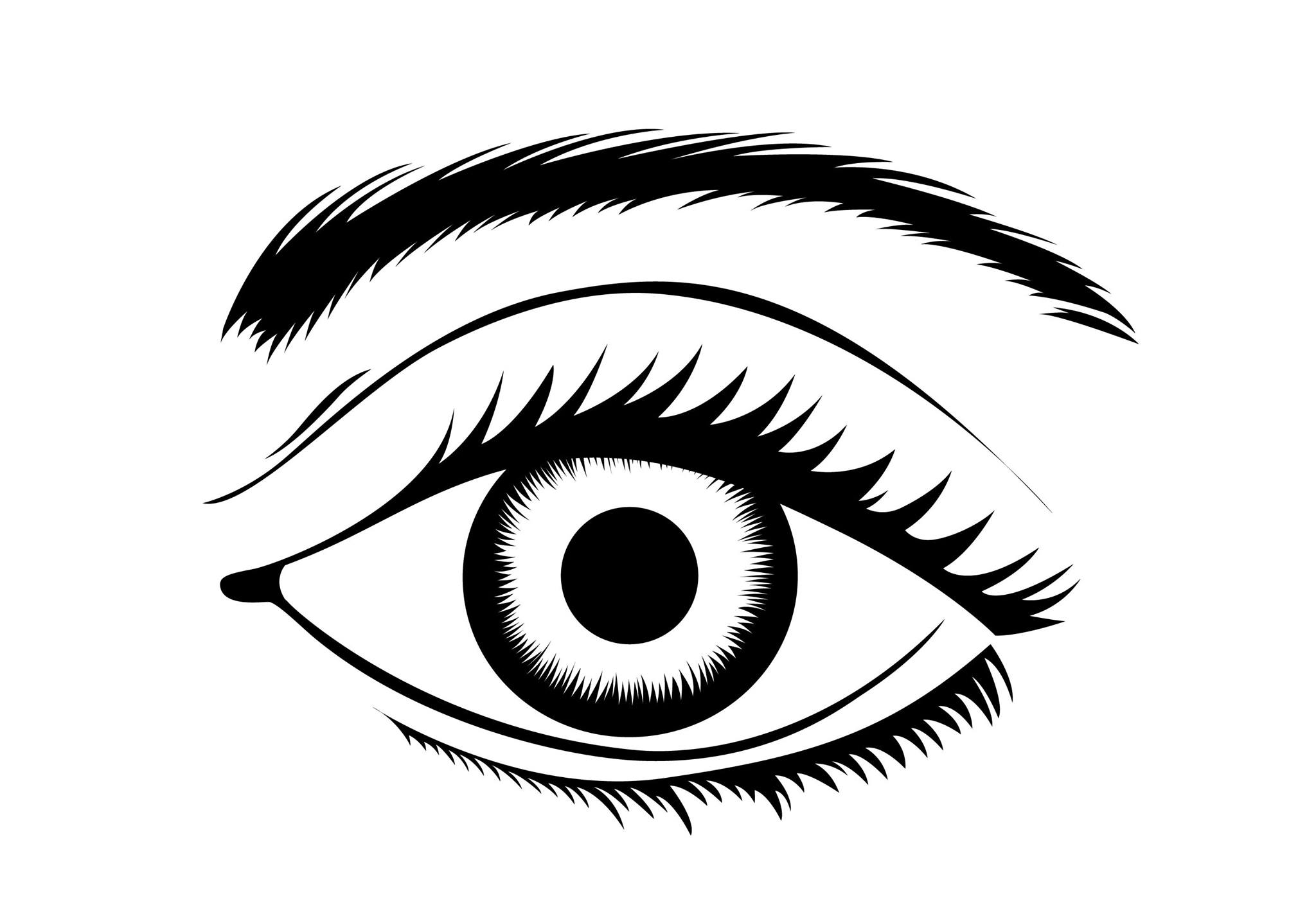
- Abbreviation: NSP (नेसपा)
- Chairman: Mahindra Ray Yadav
- General Secretary: Ramesh Prasad Yadav
- Joint Chairman: Govinda Prasad Chaudhary
- Pratinidhi Sabha Leader: Mahindra Ray Yadav
- Founded: 24 July 2022
- Registered: 182
- Dissolved: 4 November 2025
- Split from: PSP-N
- Succeeded by: Nepali Communist Party; PraLoPa
- Headquarters: Tinkune, Subidhanagar, Kathmandu, Nepal
- Ideology: Democratic socialism Factions; Madhesi rights Janajati rights Ethnic federalism
- Political position: Center-left
- Alliance: Democratic Left Alliance
- Colors
- Seats in Pratinidhi Sabha: 2 / 275
- Seats in Rastriya Sabha: 0 / 59
- Seats in Provincial Assemblies: 4 / 550

Election symbol

Party flag
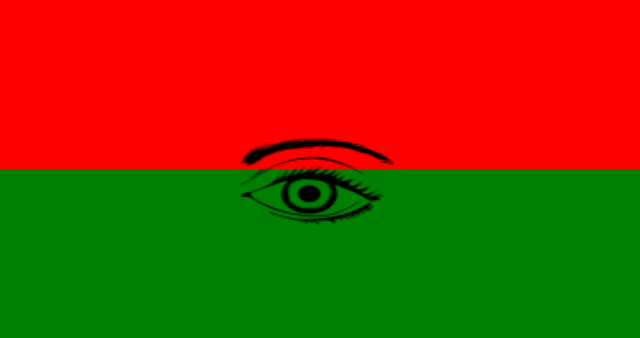

Website
- https://nepalsamajwadiparty.org.np/

The Socialist Party of Nepal (Nepali: नेपाल समाजवादी पार्टी) was a democratic socialist political party in Nepal. It is led jointly by former prime minister Dr. Baburam Bhattarai and leaders of the Terai-Madhesh region Mahindra Ray Yadav and Ramesh Prasad Yadav. The party has announced merger with six other communist parties and groups to form Nepali Communist Party.

The party was formed after a split in the People's Socialist Party, Nepal, with some members citing the authoritarian and power-oriented nature of chairman Upendra Yadav as a factor.

== History ==
=== Formation ===
The dispute amongst members of the People's Socialist Party, Nepal arose when Yadav did not call a meeting with the party's central committee. He was criticized for neglecting demands for more inclusive leadership and accused of trying to turn the organization into a national party. A faction led by Bhattaraj conducted a central committee meeting in Jadibuti, Kathmandu on 12 and 13 July 2021 which concluded in the formation of the Socialist Party of Nepal.

Several central committee members from the previous party, including Hisila Yami, Ganga Narayan Shrestha, Bhakta Bahadur Shah, Prashant Singh, Damber Khatiwada, Dan Bahadur Chaudhary, and Durga Sob, joined the new group. A majority of central committee members from Lumbini and Gandaki provinces also joined the party, including former ministers Dan Bahadur Chaudhary and Govind Chaudhary. Former constituent assembly members Muhammad Okil Musalman and Chinak Kurmi also joined the party.

Nepal Samajbadi Party (Naya Shakti), began its first national convention in Kathmandu, with 1,500 representatives electing its leadership. Founded in 2016 as Naya Shakti, the party underwent multiple mergers before its rebranding in 2023. Currently unrepresented in parliament, it aims to reshape Nepal’s political landscape and build progressive alliances.

== Electoral performance ==
=== Legislative elections ===
Election	Leader	Votes			Seats		Position	Resulting government
Election	Leader	No.	%	+/–	No.	+/–	Position	Resulting government
2022 (Note: Run in coalition with CPN (MC).)	Baburam Bhattarai; Mahendra Raya Yadav	1,175,684	11.13	New	2 / 275	New	3rd	Coalition government

== List of members of parliament ==
=== Members of Pratinidhi Sabha ===
Nepal Socialist Party (2)
Constituency/PR group	Member	Portfolio & Responsibilities / Remarks
Sarlahi 2	Mahindra Ray Yadav	
Proportional representation	Umrawati Devi Yadav	

== Leadership ==
=== Party portfolios ===
No.	Portfolio	Office holder	Terms in Office		
No.	Portfolio	Office holder	Start	End	Tenure
1	Chairman	Baburam Bhattarai	6 August 2021	Incumbent	4 years, 39 days
1	Chairman	Mahindra Ray Yadav	6 August 2021	Incumbent	4 years, 39 days
2	Joint Chairman	Govinda Prasad Chaudhary	6 August 2021	Incumbent	4 years, 39 days
3	Deputy Chairman	Durga Sob	6 August 2021	Incumbent	4 years, 39 days
3	Deputy Chairman	Hisila Yami	6 August 2021	Incumbent	4 years, 39 days
3	Deputy Chairman	Bhakta Bahadur Shah	6 August 2021	Incumbent	4 years, 39 days
4	General Secretary	Ramesh Yadav	6 August 2021	Incumbent	4 years, 39 days

== See also ==
- Nepali Communist Party
- Nepal Socialist Party (Naya Shakti)
- Baburam Bhattarai
- Mahindra Ray Yadav
