= Durga Sob =

Nepalese feminist activist

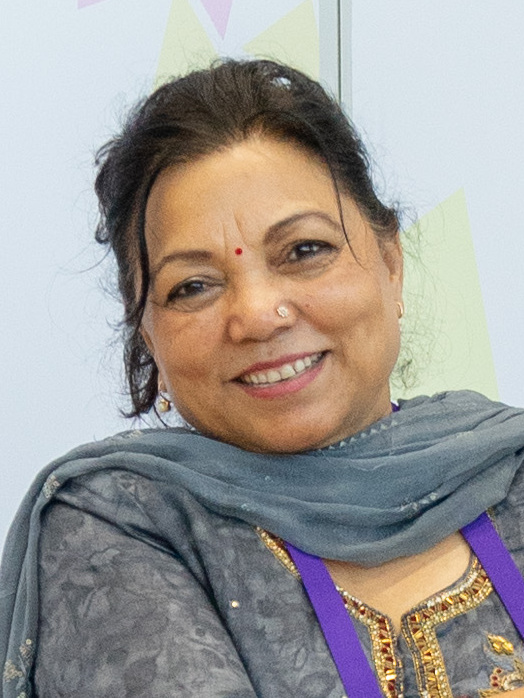

Deputy chairman of Nepal Socialist Party
- Incumbent
- Assumed office 28 July 2022
- Preceded by: Position established

Durga Sob (दुर्गा सोब in Nepali, born July 3, 1966) is a Nepalese feminist activist and politician. Sob also identifies as a Dalit and is the founder of the Feminist Dalit Organization (FEDO) in Nepal. Sob works as a human rights activist in the country and is associated with Nepal Socialist Party.

== Biography ==
Durga Sob was born on July 3, 1966. She grew up in Silgadi, in western Nepal where she faced discrimination for being a Dalit. Her family was polygamous, with her father having two wives and several children, though many of Sob's siblings died in childhood. Sob went to school with her brother, who had convinced her parents to give her an education. Sob later used her education to teach girls in her neighborhood how to read and write.

When Sob was 19, she moved to Kathmandu and worked for ActionAid and later met Robin Morgan who encouraged her to start an organization to help Dalit women. In 1994, she found the Feminist Dalit Organization (FEDO). Between 2002 and 2004, Sob served as the president of the Dalit NGO Federation (DNF). Sob led an Asia Dalit Rights Forum in Kathmandu in 2014. The forum included activists from Bangladesh, India, Nepal, Pakistan and Sri Lanka, and members decided to work together to end discrimination. In 2015, Sob participated in a hunger strike to protest the citizenship laws of Nepal that only allowed a father to pass down citizenship by descent.
