= Himalaya Roadies =

Nepalese reality show

- Genre: Reality; Drama
- Based on: MTV Roadies
- Directed by: Aman Pratap Adhikary (seasons 1–3); Simosh Sunuwar (seasons 4–6)
- Presented by: Raymon Das Shrestha (seasons 1–4); Suraj Singh Thakuri (season 5); Raymon Das Shrestha (seasons 6)
- Starring: Anoop Bikram Shahi; Deeya Maskey; Priyanka Karki; Laure
- Theme music composer: Aashish Rana A.K.A Laure
- Opening theme: Himalaya Roadies Open Song
- Country of origin: Nepal
- Original languages: Nepali; English
- No. of seasons: 5 (6th on underway)

Production
- Camera setup: Multi-camera

Original release
- Network: Himalaya TV Himalaya Roadies
- Release: 3 July 2017

Related
- MTV Roadies

Himalaya Roadies is an adventure-based Nepalese reality show. It is franchise of the MTV Roadies series. The series is broadcast by the Nepalese network Himalaya TV and airs every week for an hour. The participants receive difficult tasks to complete to become a roadie. Only people of 18 and over are allowed to participate in the show. Season 4, with the theme of Season of Survival, followed the former format of MTV Roadies. Well known TV host and personality Suraj Singh Thakuri replaced Raymon Das Shrestha as the host of the show in season 5. The fifth season is titled "Power of five". In previous seasons there were four gang leaders, namely Anoop Bikram Shahi, Saman Shrestha (Extreme Athlete), Deeya Maskey and Ashish Rana, a.k.a. Laure. However, from the fifth season, actress Priyanka Karki will replace Saman Shrestha as gang leader, whereas other leaders will remain intact in their respective positions. The show was previously directed by Aman Pratap Adhikari but director and producer Simosh Sunwar has directed it from the fourth season onwards. Season 6 with theme "Welcome To The Jungle" is underway to physical audition and Raymon Das Sherestha is back on position of host to replace Suraj Singh Thakuri.

== Plot ==
Himalaya Roadies is a reality show based on the popular Indian TV show MTV Roadies. The series is focused on young adults of Nepal seeking adventure. Contestants are given seemingly impossible tasks to push them to their limits. They travel to scenic locations all over Nepal, and the last one to survive is crowned a Himalaya Roadie.

== Series ==
Season	Year	Title	Main Host	Date		No.of Episodes	Contestants	Destinations	Prize money	Winning Gang Leader	Winner	Runner-up
Season	Year	Title	Main Host	Launch	Finale	No.of Episodes	Contestants	Destinations	Prize money	Winning Gang Leader	Winner	Runner-up
1	2017	Rising Through Hell	Natasha Shah	N/A	N/A	18	17	Nepal	Rs 1,090,000	N/A	Saman Shrestha	Animesh Shahi
2	2018	Wild Wild West	Saman Shrestha & Animesh Shahi	N/A	N/A	18	13	Nepal	Rs 1,090,000	N/A	Ayush Shrestha	Tejaswi Basnet
3	2019	Blood, Sweat and Tears	Raymond Das Shrestha	N/A	N/A	18	18	Nepal	Rs 1,090,000	Laure	Sujan Subedi	Diwas Shrestha
4	2021	Season of Survival	Raymond Das Shrestha			18	18	Nepal	Rs 1,090,000	Anup	Nasib Tamang	Ricin Shrestha
5	2023	Power of Five	Suraj Singh Thakuri			18		Nepal	Rs 1,000,000 and Yamaha Bike	Laure	Sanjip Rai	Bishwa Magar
6	2024	Welcome the Jungle	Raymond Das Shrestha			18		Nepal	Rs 1,000,000 and Yamaha Bike	Anup	Joseph Sharma	Aravind Chand Thakuri

== Season 1 ==
=== Destination ===
- Mustang, Nepal – episodes 6–8
- Pokhara, Nepal – episodes 9–12
- Chitwan, Nepal – episodes 13–15
- Nawalparasi, Nepal – episodes 16–17

=== Audition ===
Date	Location
1 March	Pokhara, Nepal
4 March	Butwal, Nepal
6 March	Chitwan, Nepal
9 March	Dharan, Nepal
13–14 March	Kathmandu, Nepal

=== Judges ===
Season	Judges		
1	Laure	Raymon Das Shrestha	Deeya Maskey

Season	Presenter
1	Natasha Shah

Rannvijay Singha made his special appearance in the grade finale of Himalaya Roadies season 1.

=== Contestants ===
There were originally 17 contestants at the beginning of the journey. However, in episode 6, Aashish, Faruk, Gaurav, and Neelam were eliminated after receiving the most votes from their fellow contestants.

Contestant	Hometown	Finish	Place
Aashish	Chandragadi	Eliminated in episode 6	14–18
Animesh	Pokhara	Runner up	2
Bikash	Nepalgunj	Voted out in episode 15	6–7
Bishal	Chitwan	Voted out in episode 11	10
Faruk	Birgunj	Eliminated in episode 6	14–18
Gaurav	Biratnagar	Eliminated in episode 6	14–18
Menuka	Pokhara	Voted out in episode 9	13
Neelam	Kathmandu	Eliminated in episode 6	14–18
Prasot	Kathmandu	Voted out in episode 10	11–12
Ranjana	Kathmandu	Eliminated in episode 17	3–4
Reshma	Pokhara	Voted out in episode 12	9
Riya	Kathmandu	Voted out in episode 8; Wild card entry in episode 13; Voted out in episode 15	6–7
Rupam	Janakpur	Voted out in episode 10	11–12
Saman	Dharan	Winner	1
Sonangkita	Butwal	Voted out in episode 14	8
Sudit	Kathmandu	Voted out in episode 7; Wild card entry in episode 13; Eliminated in episode 17	3–4
Suzana	Pokhara	Voted out in episode 16	5

=== Roadies' presence ===
Episodes 1 to 5 were the audition round and from episode 6 onwards, the competition officially started.

Key	Contestant won the competition	Contestant entered as a wild card entry	Contestant was voted out of the competition by other roadies	Contestant forfeited the competition due to illness

Roadie	ep 6	ep 7	ep 8	ep 9	ep 10	ep 11	ep 12	ep 13	ep 14	ep 15	ep 16	ep 17	ep 18
Saman Shrestha	✓	✓	✓	✓	✓	✓	✓	✓	✓	✓	✓	✓	
Animesh Shahi	✓	✓	✓	✓	✓	✓	✓	✓	✓	✓	✓	✓	✓
Ranjana Bhattarai	✓	✓	✓	✓	✓	✓	✓	✓	✓	✓	✓	✓	✓
Sudit Shrestha	✓	✓						✓	✓	✓	✓	✓	✓
Suzana Shrestha	✓	✓	✓	✓	✓	✓	✓	✓	✓	✓	✓		✓
Bikash Thapa	✓	✓	✓	✓	✓	✓	✓	✓	✓	✓			✓
Riya Swar	✓	✓	✓					✓	✓	✓			✓
Sonangkita Adhikari	✓	✓	✓	✓	✓	✓	✓	✓	✓				✓
Gaurav Khatiwada	✓							✓					✓
Prasot Kandel	✓	✓	✓	✓	✓			✓					✓
Reshma Nhuchhen Pradhan	✓	✓	✓	✓	✓	✓	✓						✓
Bishal Koirala	✓	✓	✓	✓	✓	✓							✓
Rupam Mishra	✓	✓	✓	✓	✓								✓
Menuka Tamang	✓	✓	✓	✓									✓
Aashish Shrestha	✓												✓
Seikh Farukh Miya	✓												
Neelam Khadka	✓												✓

✓ = indicates that Roadie was present in the episode.

✗ = indicates that Roadie was absent in the episode.

= indicates that Roadie was present in the episode but as a part of the audience for watching the Finale rather than as a contestant for the title.

== Season 2 ==
=== Destination ===
- Mustang, Nepal – episodes 6–8
- Pokhara, Nepal – episodes 9–12
- Chitwan, Nepal – episode 13–15
- Nawalparasi, Nepal – episodes 16–17

=== Audition ===
Date	Location
30 July	Chitwan, Nepal
6 August	Butwal, Nepal
13 August	Pokhara, Nepal
20 August	Dharan, Nepal
27 August	Kathmandu, Nepal

=== Judges ===
Season	Judges		
1	Laure	Raymon Das Shrestha	Deeya Maskey

Season	Presenters
1	Saman Shrestha and Animesh Shahi

Actor Karma and Nepali boxing champion Maxx were seen in the journey round of Himalaya Roadies season 2.

=== Contestants ===
Contestant	Hometown	Finish	Place
Anish Baniya	Pokhara	5th	Eliminated
Ashmita Sunar	Kathmandu	9th	Eliminated
Ayush Shrestha	Butwal	1st	Winner
Barsha Pun	Butwal	9th	Eliminated
Men Kumari Ghale	Chitwan	4th	Wildcard entry, eliminated
Milan Khadka	Butwal	7th	Eliminated
Pribir Ghale	Pokhara	3rd	Finalist
Rabin Rai	Itahari	6th	Eliminated
Richa Shah	Kathmandu	8th	Eliminated
Sagar Rijal	Biratnagar	11th	Came as wildcard entry but was eliminated
Srijan Bhattarai	Kathmandu	10th	Eliminated
Subha Sharma	Chitwan	12th	Ejected due to fight with crew
Tejaswi Basnet	Kathmandu	2nd	Wildcard entry, finalist

=== Roadies' presence ===
Episodes 1 to 5 were the audition round and from episode 6 onwards, the competition officially started.

Key	Contestant won the competition	Contestant entered as a wild card entry	Contestant was voted out of the competition by other roadies	Contestant forfeited the competition due to illness

Contestant	Hometown	Episodes												Position
Contestant	Hometown	7	8	9	10	11	12	13	14	15	16	17	18	Position
Ayush Shrestha	Butwal	Safe	Safe	Safe	Safe	Safe	Safe	Immune	Safe	Safe	Safe	Safe	Winner	Winner
Tejaswi Basnet	Kathmandu	Safe	Safe	Eliminated			Wild Card	Safe	Bottom 2	Immune	Safe	Safe	Runner Up	2nd Place
Pribir Ghale	Pokhara	Safe	Safe	Safe	Safe	Bottom 3	Safe	Safe	Safe	Bottom 2	Safe	Bottom 2	Eliminated	3rd Place
Men Kumari Ghale	Chitwan	Safe	Safe	Safe	Safe	Safe	Wild Card	Safe	Safe	Safe	Bottom 2	Eliminated		4th Place
Anish Baniya	Pokhara	Safe	Safe	Safe	Safe	Safe	Safe	Immune	Safe	Safe	Eliminated			5th Place
Rabin Rai	Itahari	Safe	Safe	Safe	Safe	Safe	Safe	Safe	Safe	Eliminated				6th Place
Milan Khadka	Butwal	Safe	Safe	Safe	Safe	Bottom 3	Safe	Bottom 2	Eliminated					7th Place
Sagar Rijal	Biratnagar	Safe	Eliminated				Wild Card	Eliminated						11th Place
Richa Shah	Kathmandu	Safe	Safe	Safe	Bottom 3	Eliminated								8th Place
Ashmita Sunar	Kathmandu	Safe	Safe	Bottom 3	Eliminated									9th Place/10th Place
Barsha Pun	Butwal	Safe	Safe	Safe	Eliminated									9th Place/10th Place
Srijan Bhattarai	Kathmandu	Safe	Bottom 2	Eliminated										10th Place
Subha Sharma	Chitwan	Ejected												12th Place

Notes:

Indicates the contestant won the task that week.
Indicates the contestant was safe that week.
Indicates the contestant was immune that week.
Indicates the contestant was in danger that week.
Indicates the contestant was eliminated that week.
The contestant quit the competition.
Indicates the contestant wild card entry in the competition.
Indicates the contestant was eliminated outside vote-out that week.
Real Heroes used their hero immunity.
Indicates the contestant is the runner up.
Indicates the contestant won the competition.

✓ = indicates that Roadie was present in the episode.

✗ = indicates that Roadie was absent in the episode.

= indicates that Roadie was present in the episode but as part of the audience for watching the Finale rather than as a contestant for the title.

== Season 3 ==
=== Destination ===
- Mustang, Nepal – episodes 6–8
- Pokhara, Nepal – episodes 9–12
- Chitwan, Nepal – episodes 13–15
- Nawalparasi, Nepal – episodes 16–17

=== Audition ===
Date	Location
30 July	Chitwan, Nepal
6 August	Butwal, Nepal
13 August	Pokhara, Nepal
20 August	Dharan, Nepal
27 August	Kathmandu, Nepal

=== Judges ===
Season	Gang leaders			
1	Laure	Diya Maskey	Saman Shrestha	Anoop Bikram Shahi

Season	Presenter
1	Raymond Das Shrestha

The finalists from MTV Roadies and real hero Bidhan Shrestha and another real hero from MTV Roadies, Bhargsetu, were present in the culling round of this season. Similarly, Priyanka Karki was also seen in three episodes of Himalaya Roadies where she was present with some game-changing superpowers and twists.

=== Contestants ===
Contestant	Hometown	Episodes												Position
Contestant	Hometown	7	8	9	10	11	12	13	14	15	16	17	18	Position
Sujan Subedi	Pokhara	Task Winner	Task Winner	Immune	Task Winner	Saved	Safe	Task Winner	Immune	Immune	Safe	Saved	Winner	Winner
Diwas Shrestha	Kathmandu	Immune	Safe	Safe	Safe	Safe	Safe	Safe	Task Winner	Task Winner	Task Winner	Task Winner	Runner Up	2nd Place
Satish Raj Bhandari	Kathmandu	Immune	Safe	Immune	Safe	Safe	Safe	Safe	Safe	Safe	Safe	Eliminated		3rd/4th Place
Pijja Maharjan	Kathmandu					Wild Card	Safe	Safe	Safe	Safe	Safe	Eliminated		3rd/4th Place
Ram Chandra KC	Nepalgunj	Task Winner	Task Winner	Safe	Task Winner	Safe	Safe	Task Winner	Safe	Safe	Eliminated			5th Place
Ashish Gurung	Syangja	Safe	Safe	Immune	Safe	Saved	Task Winner	Bottom 3	Immune	Eliminated				6th / 9th Place
Gazi Mohammad Masood	Nepalgunj	Safe	Safe	Safe	Safe	Safe	Task Winner	Safe	Safe	Eliminated				6th / 9th Place
Manisha Bishwokarma	Dharan	Safe	Safe	Bottom 4	Saved	Safe	Safe	Safe	Safe	Eliminated				6th / 9th Place
Pratima Sen	Kathmandu	Safe	Safe	Bottom 4	Safe	Safe	Task Winner	Safe	Eliminated					9th / 10th Place
Sagar Shahi	Kathmandu	Task Winner	Task Winner	Safe	Task Winner	Safe	Safe	Task Winner	Eliminated					9th / 10th Place
Sanju Karki	Kathmandu					Wild Card	Safe	Eliminated						11th / 12th Place
Shreya Maharjan	Pokhara	Safe	Safe	Task Winner	Safe	Safe	Safe	Eliminated						11th / 12th Place
Vidhya Gurung	Pokhara	Safe	Safe	Safe	Safe	Safe	Eliminated							13th Place
Joshika Shrestha	Dharan	Safe	Safe	Safe	Eliminated									14th / 15th Place
Sonika Prajapati	Kathmandu	Safe	Safe	Safe	Eliminated									14th / 15th Place
Avish Pokharel	Dharan	Bottom 2	Safe	Eliminated										16th / 17th Place
Dikshya Lamichhane	Lumbini	Task Winner	Task Winner	Eliminated										16th / 17th Place
Bicky Gurung	Pokhara	Eliminated												18th Place

Team colours:

Team Saman
Team Diya
Team Anoop
Team Laure

Notes:

Indicates the contestant won the task that week.
Indicates the contestant was safe that week.
Indicates the contestant was immune that week.
Indicates the contestant was in danger that week.
Indicates the contestant was eliminated that week.
The contestant quit the competition.
Indicates the contestant wild card entry in the competition.
Indicates the contestant was eliminated outside vote-out that week.
Real Heroes used their hero immunity.
Indicates the contestant is the runner up.
Indicates the contestant won the competition.

== Season 4 ==
=== Destination ===
- Kathmandu, Nepal – episode 1
- Chitwan, Nepal – episode 2
- Dharan, Nepal – episode 3
- Pokhara, Nepal – episode 4
- Nepalgunj, Nepal – episode 5

=== Audition ===
Date	Location
13 December 2021	Kathmandu, Nepal
19 December 2021	Chitwan, Nepal
26 December 2021	Dharan, Nepal
3 January 2022	Pokhara, Nepal
10 January 2022	Nepalgunj, Nepal

=== Judges ===
Season	Gang leaders			
1	Laure (rap artist)	Diya Maskey	Saman Shrestha	Anoop Bikram Shahi

Season	Presenter
1	Raymond Das Shrestha

Like other seasons of the show, this season also saw some famous Nepali faces. Vten was seen in the audition round, whereas Nischal Basnet and winner of season 3, Sujan Subedi, were seen in the finale to boost the contestants' energy.

=== Contestants ===
Contestant	Hometown	Episodes												Position
Contestant	Hometown	7	8	9	10	11	12	13	14	15	16	17	18	Position
Naseeb Tamang	Sikkim	Winner												Winner
Ricin Shrestha	Butwal	Eliminated												2nd Place
Sagar Lama	Pokhara	Eliminated												3rd Place
Dilip Nepali	Chitwan	Eliminated												4th Place
Bibesh Shrestha	Tansen	Eliminated												5th Place
Sandesh Sampang Rai	Dharan	Eliminated												6th/7th/8thPlace
Pranisha Thapa Magar	Rupandehi	Eliminated												6th/7th/8th Place
Suraj Bhattarai	Dharan	Eliminated												6th/7th/8th Place
Sita tamang	Kathmandu	Eliminated												9th/10th Place
Shivaraj Tamang	Kathmandu	Eliminated												9th/10th Place
Anusha Raut	Pokhara	Eliminated												11th Place
Ajay Kumar shah	Pokhara	Eliminated												12th Place
Pukar kc	Pokhara	Eliminated												13th/14th Place
Rajesh Gaiju	Pokhara	Eliminated												13th/14th Place
Sagar Bc	Pokhara	Eliminated												15th Place
Nilam thapa	Pokhara	Eliminated												16/17th Place
urmila basnet	Pokhara	Eliminated												16th/17th Place

== Season 7 ==
=== Judges ===
Season	Gang leaders			
7	Laure (rap artist)	Priyanka Karki	Kabita Nepali	Anoop Bikram Shahi

Season	Presenter
7	Raymond Das Shrestha

=== Contestants ===
Contestant	Hometown	Finish	Place
Upendra Shahi	Dhangadhi	Eliminated	Semi Finalist
Anish Thapa	Jhapa	Winner	1st
Rajju Maharjan	Kathmandu	Eliminated	Top 8
Sharon Rai	Jaigaon	Eliminated	Eliminated
Min Bahadur Budha	Simikot	Eliminated	Eliminated
Narendra Bahadur Moktan	Siddharthanagar	Eliminated	TBA
Ajay Kumar Mandal	Biratnagar	Eliminated	Eliminated
Rojita Lama	Kathmandu	Runner Up	2nd
Basudev Malla	Bajura	Eliminated	Top 10
Mahendra Bahadur Thapa Magar	Okhaldhunga	Eliminated	Eliminated
Srijan Bhattarai	Kathmandu	Eliminated	Eliminated
Subha Sharma	Chitwan	Eliminated	Eliminated
Tejaswi Basnet	Kathmandu	Eliminated	Eliminated
Sunidhi Rai	Kathmandu	Eliminated	Semi Finalist

=== Roadies' presence ===
Episodes 1 to 5 were the audition round and from episode 6 onwards, the competition officially started.

Key	Contestant won the competition	Contestant entered as a wild card entry	Contestant was voted out of the competition by other roadies	Contestant forfeited the competition due to illness

Contestant	Hometown	Episodes												Position
Contestant	Hometown	7	8	9	10	11	12	13	14	15	16	17	18	Position
Upendra Shahi	Dhangadhi	TBA												TBA
Anish Tamang	Jhapa	TBA												TBA
Rajju Maharjan	Kathmandu	TBA												TBA
Sharon Rai	Jaigaon	TBA												TBA
Min Bahadur Budha	Simikot	TBA												TBA
Narendra Bahadur Moktan	Siddharthanagar	TBA												TBA
Pranisha Thapa Magar	Rupandehi	TBA												TBA
Suraj Bhattarai	Dharan	TBA												TBA
Sita tamang	Kathmandu	TBA												TBA
Shivaraj Tamang	Kathmandu	TBA												TBA
Anusha Raut	Pokhara	TBA												TBA
Ajay Kumar shah	Pokhara	TBA												TBA
Pukar kc	Pokhara	TBA												TBA
Rajesh Gaiju	Pokhara	TBA												TBA
Sagar Bc	Pokhara	TBA												TBA
Nilam thapa	Pokhara	TBA												TBA
urmila basnet	Pokhara	TBA												TBA

Team colours:

Team Kabita
Team Priyanka
Team Anoop
Team Laure

Notes:

Indicates the contestant won the task that week.
Indicates the contestant was safe that week.
Indicates the contestant was immune that week.
Indicates the contestant was in danger that week.
Indicates the contestant was eliminated that week.
The contestant quit the competition.
Indicates the contestant wild card entry in the competition.
Indicates the contestant was eliminated outside vote-out that week.
Real Heroes used their hero immunity.
Indicates the contestant is the runner up.
Indicates the contestant won the competition.
