= Laure (Nepalese rapper) =

Nepalese rapper (born 1989)

Laure आशिष राना मगर
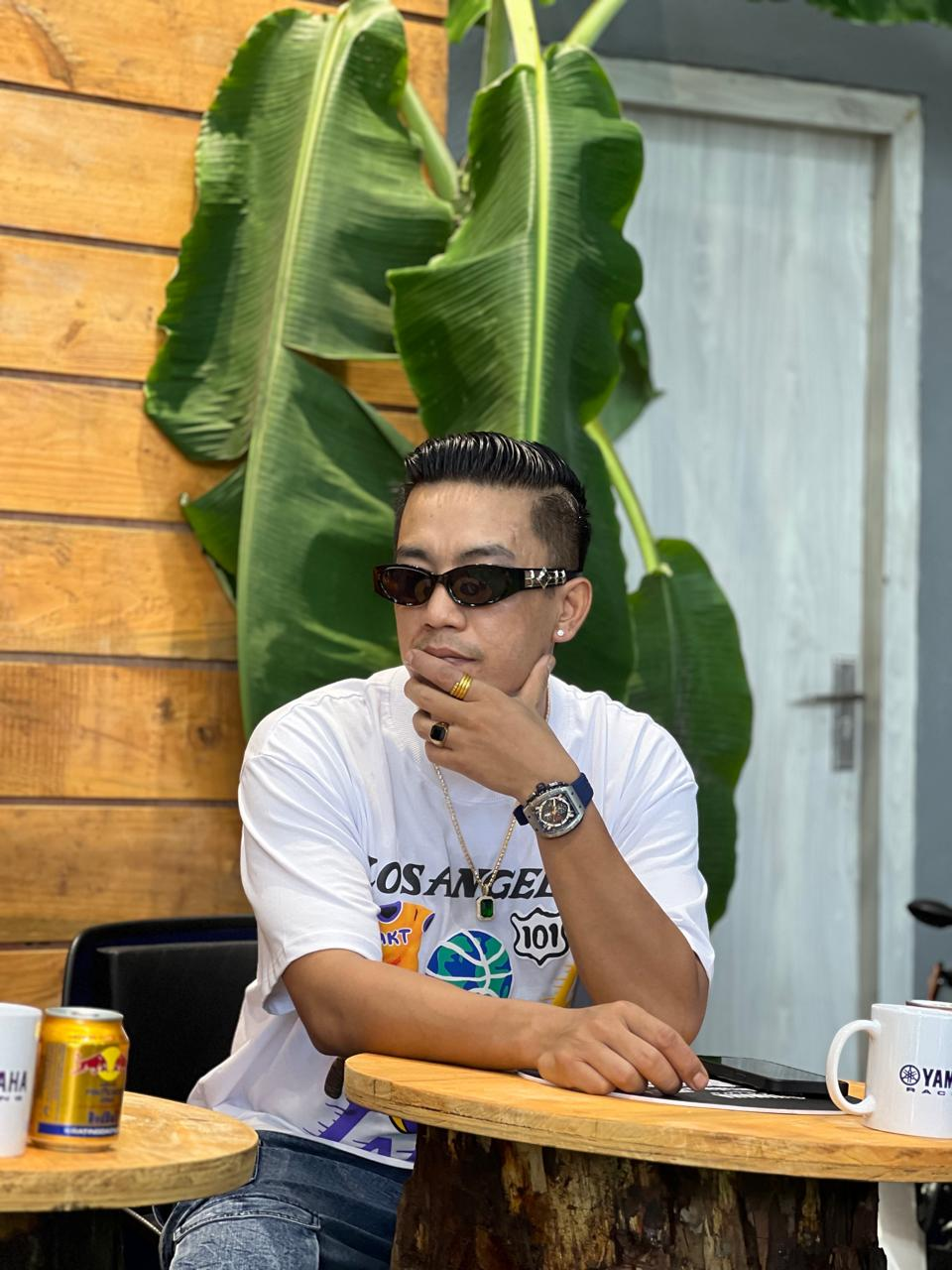
- Ashish in 2024

Background information
- Also known as: Laure
- Born: Ashish Rana Magar; 25 June 1989 (age 37); Pokhara, Nepal
- Origin: Pokhara, Nepal
- Genre: Nephop
- Occupations: Rapper, actor
- Instruments: Guitar, vocals
- Years active: 2010–present
- Website: akalaure.com

Ashish Rana Magar (born 25 June 1989), known professionally as Laure, is a Nepalese rapper and television personality. He presented his rapping through a rap battle on YouTube which gained him popularity. He was the most searched Nepalese celebrity on Google in the year 2013.

== Personal life ==
Ashish Rana Magar was born on 25 June 1989 in Pokhara, Nepal. Since Grade 6, Laure developed a keen interest in rapping. He completed his school life from the LA Higher Secondary School, then his higher education from Sagarmatha College. His rapping career began through his song Mero Solta, the first song he recorded. Because of his physical appearance, his friends gave him the moniker "Laure". He is also currently one of the judges of the Reality TV Show Himalaya Roadies which began in mid-2017.

== Songs ==
Year	Title	Genre	Notes
2012	Pokhara		
2013	Case no. 420	Story Telling Rap	
	Haude	Story Telling Rap	
	Mero Solta	Story Telling Rap	
	Sabai Ho Laure	Pop	
2014	Yuddha		
2016	Banawati		Chup Laag
2016	Saathi ho		Chup Laag
2017	Nephop ko bato		Chup Laag
	Yo Pokhara Mero	Pop/Hip hop/Rap	
2017	Superraga	Pop/Hip hop/Rap	Chup Laag
2018	Stay Open featuring Diplo, MØ, Laure and Bipul Chhetri		
2021	La hai la hai featuring Kavi G and DJ AJ		
2022	Birami		
2024	Road side Romeo		

Laure has also sing Intro songs for all 4 seasons of Himalaya Roadies.

== Filmography ==
Year	Movie	Role	Character
2014	Tandav	Lead Role	Amrit

Reality TV Show
Year	TV Show	Role
2017/2019/2020/2021/2023/2024	Himalaya Roadies	Judge/Gang leader
