= Pragatisheel Loktantrik Party =

Progressive Democratic Party Pragatisheel Loktantrik Party प्रगतिशील लोकतान्त्रिक पार्टी
- Abbreviation: PDP; PLP; PraLoPa
- Leader: Janardan Sharma
- Presidium: 5 membered
- Spokesperson: Santosh Pariyar
- Founder: Baburam Bhattarai, Janardan Sharma, Santosh Pariyar and others
- Founded: 20 November 2025; 8 months ago
- Merger of: Maoist Centre (minority); NSP (Naya Shakti)
- Ideology: Democratic socialism Progressive socialism
- Political position: Centre-left
- Colours
- Slogan: Nepali Soil, Our Way नेपाली माटो, हाम्रो बाटो
- Seats in Gandaki Provincial Assembly: 1 / 60

Election symbol

Party flag
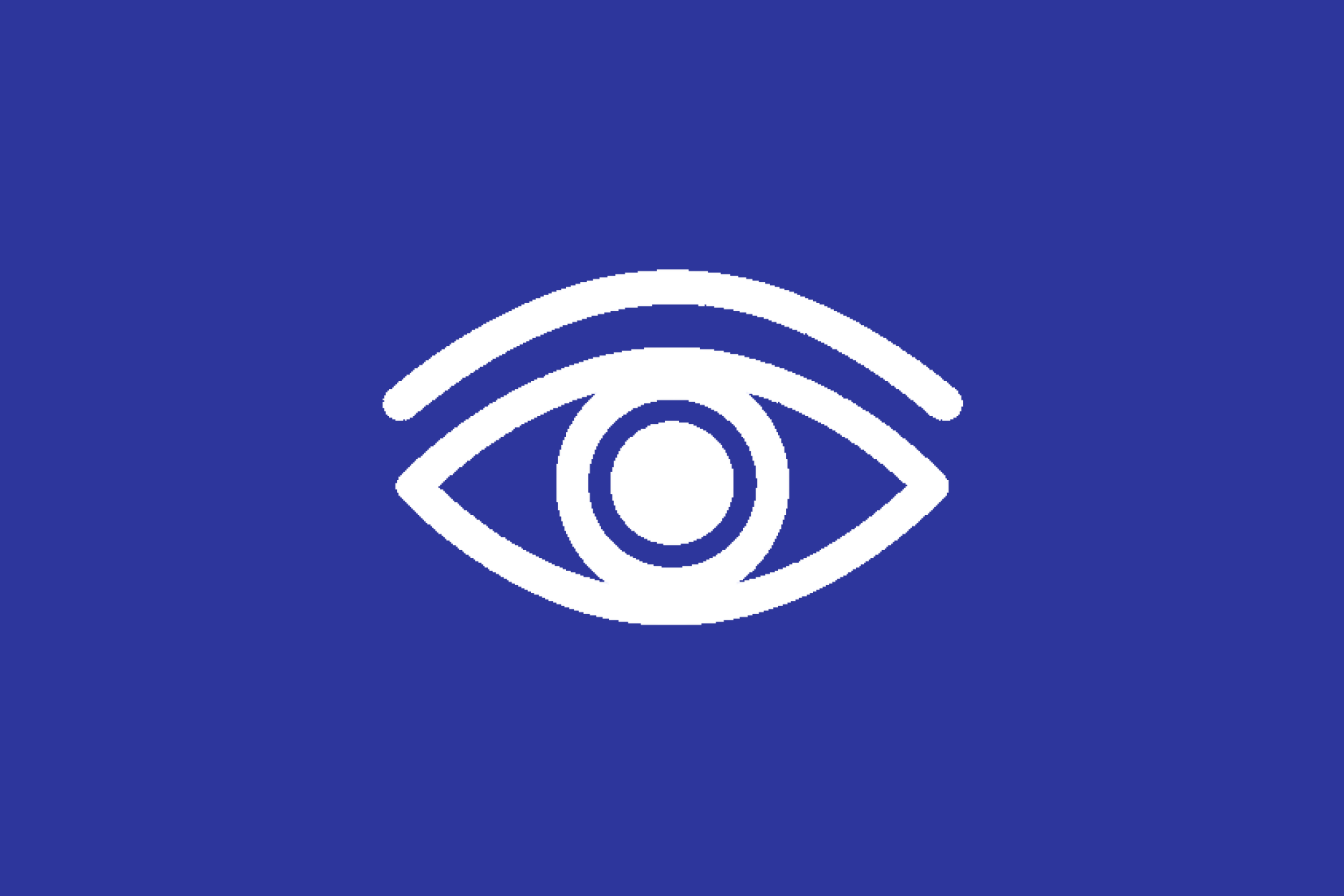

The Pragatisheel Loktantrik Party (Note: Nepali: प्रगतिशील लोकतान्त्रिक पार्टी, lit. 'Progressive Democratic Party', abbr.) (PLP) (Note: Nepali: प्रलोपा) is a centre-left political party in Nepal. The party formation was announced on 14 November 2025 through an agreement signed by former Prime Minister Baburam Bhattarai's Nepal Socialist Party, Janardan Sharma's Progressive National Campaign, and Santosh Pariyar, former chief whip of the Rastriya Swatantra Party. The party retained the eye as its election symbol.

== History ==
=== Formation ===
Former Finance and Home minister of Nepal, Janardan Sharma formed the Progressive National Campaign along with former ministers Ram Karki, Sudan Kirati from CPN (Maoist Centre) that had opposed the formation of Nepali Communist Party. The campaign was launched 4 November 2025 with a vision to develop new form of Nepali socialism putting forward youths in leadership. The campaign aimed to create a new mainstream leftist force, free from the influence of older leaders who have been involved in the political revolving door of leadership.

On 14 November 2025 the campaign announced the formation of the Pragatisheel Loktantrik Party along with former Prime Minister Baburam Bhattarai's Nepal Socialist Party (Naya Shakti) and former Rastriya Swatantra Party chief whip Santosh Pariyar.

In May 2026, Bhattarai left the PLP.

== Ideology ==
As part of the original merger agreement, the party's ideology consisted of Progressive Socialism and support for a multi-party system in Nepal, while the party itself remains officially secular. The party's ideological political stand with participation of all in democracy. The party's manifesto called for a transition to a directly elected presidential system, direct elections for provincial heads and a fully proportional electoral system. The party proposed limiting the federal parliament to legislative duties and forming a cabinet chosen by the executive head. The manifesto called for the formation of a National Development Authority that would be under the executive's leadership. It also proposed free education up to the secondary level, free basic healthcare and a unified social security system. The party also proposed 100 days of employment or equivalent in unemployment benefits for individuals aged 21 to 30. The manifesto called for the introduction of the right to reject and right to recall and voting rights of Nepalis abroad. It supported progressive taxation, encouraging foreign investment, including from Non-Resident Nepalis, and agricultural insurance. The manifesto aims for full domestic energy self-sufficiency. It also proposed granting citizenship by descent for children of Nepali emigrants up to three generations.

== Central committee ==
The party formed 151 membered central committee under conservation of Baburam Bhattarai. Former ministers Janardan Sharma, Ram Karki stayed on role of senior leaders without portfolio.

== Leadership ==
=== Presidium ===
- Sudan Kirati
- Durga Sob
- Santosh Pariyar
- Ojaswi Bhattarai
- Ashok Jayaswal

== See also ==
- Baburam Bhattarai
- Janardan Sharma
- Santosh Pariyar
- Ujyaalo Nepal Party
