= Resham Firiri =

Song by Sunder Shrestha Dwarika Lal Joshi
- Language: Nepali
- English title: Silk Firiri
- Released: 1969
- Genre: Folk
- Length: 5:28
- Label: Music Nepal
- Composer: Buddhi Pariyar

Resham Firiri (Nepali: रेशम फिरिरि) is a traditional Nepali folk song, composed by Buddhi Pariyar and originally performed by Sunder Shrestha and Dwarika Lal Joshi in 1969. Due to sudden rise in popularity, it became one of the most widely known and performed songs in Nepal. It is often played on the sarangi, a native instrument, as street music.

== Origin ==
Resham Firiri was collected in the villages of Pokhara by Buddhi Pariyar and was recorded in Nepalese radio Radio Nepal. Buddhi Pariyar gave the lyrics to popular Nepalese singers Sunder Shrestha and Dwarika Lal Joshi who were the most popular singers then, and released in Nepal in 1970 Nepalese local radios, it became a hit song.

The newer version of this song has been made by trekkers and is famous among the Himalayan travellers in Nepal. In 2018, the song was performed by Germany’s Stuttgart Chamber Orchestra on the 50th anniversary of the Germany-Nepal diplomatic relations. 17 musicians from Germany and 30 Nepali musicians performed this song, making it even more special in Nepal.

== Track listing ==
| No. | Title | Singer(s) | Length |
|---|---|---|---|
| 1. | "Resham Firiri" | Sunder Shrestha, Dwarika Lal Joshi | 5:01 |
| Total length: | | | 5:01 |

== Instruments ==
- Sarangi (violin like Nepali musical instrument)
- Madal (Nepali traditional drum)
- Basuri (Nepali flute)
