= Jagan Timilsina =

Nepalese mountaineer

Jagan Nath Timilsina
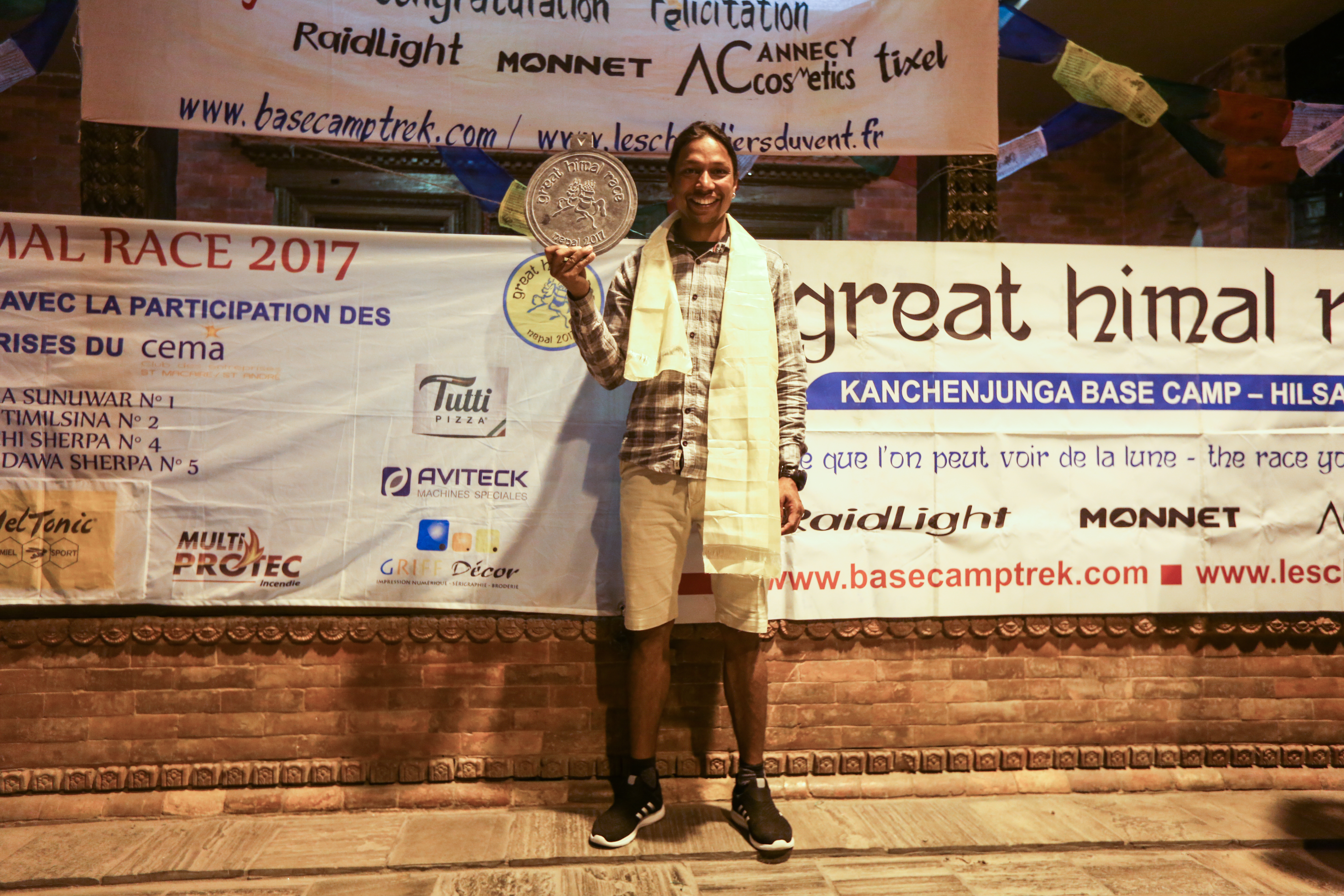
- Born: 7 April 1984 (age 41); Sarangkot, Pokhara

Jagan Nath Timilsina (born 7 April 1984) is a famous Nepalese trail runner, mountaineer and an outdoor instructor.

== Career ==
He summited Mount Everest on May 19, 2012. He has summited 30 mountain peaks so far including those like Mount Jarvis, Ama Dablam and Ben Nevis. In 2017, he was the winner of the 1600 km Great Himal Race, an ultra-trail organized by Les Chevaliers du Vent & Base Camp Trek from Kanchenjunga to the foot of Mount Kailash. He completed the race in 45 days (315 h 37 m). In 2020, he found the best climbing route to Mardi Himal.

He has also served as a medic and race director in outdoor events.
