= Dilkrishna Shrestha =

Nepali journalist and entertainer

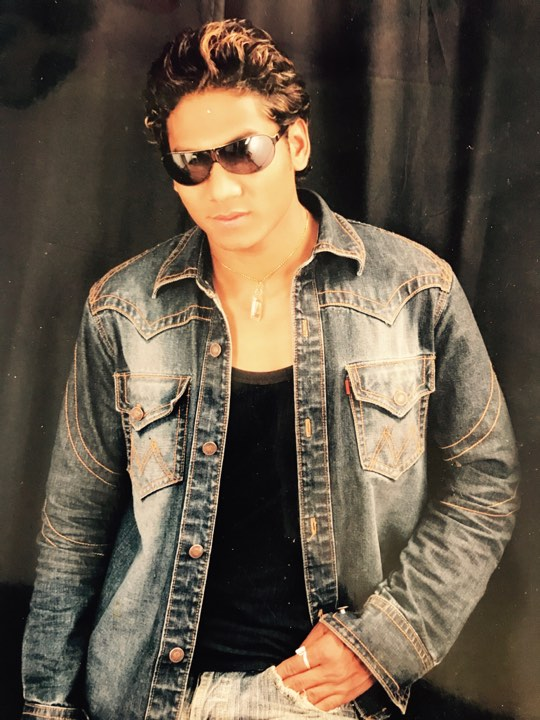
- Dilkrishna Shrestha during the filming of shikari
- Born: February 21, 1986 (age 40); Tinkhole-11, Bhimeshwor, Dolkha, Nepal
- Other name: Dil
- Occupation: Actor
- Years active: 2010–present
- Spouse: Ram Bahadur Shrestha

Dilkrishna Shrestha was born in Tinkhole-11, Bhimeshwor of Dolkha district, Nepal. His family later moved to Kathmandu. He has been a journalist, radio presenter, film actor, producer, writer, music director, lyricist and is now managing director of a film company.

== Early life ==
Dil Krishna Shrestha was born on 21 February 1986, in, Tinkhole-11, Bhimeshwor, Dolkha, Nepal, to father Ram Bahadur Shrestha and mother Dila Maya Shrestha with 10 elder siblings. As a child he was fascinated by Hindi and Nepali films and was an avid listener of Nepali songs.

== Film making ==
Dil Krishna Shrestha established a feature film production house called "Shrestha International Media and Corporate House Pvt " which has completed three films with another 2 set for pre-production. The films include: Timi Jaha Vaye Pani, Bullet, and Loot Company. Shrestha has worked as a journalist for four years on the Janaprhar Weekly, and as a radio presenter on radio Radio HBC, Radio ECR and as a video jockey on Channel CEC. As an actor, he has appeared in: Sikari, Sikari 2, Tarjan, Dhunge Youg, and Timi Jaha Bhaye Pani. He has also produced the films: Timi Jaha Bhaye Pani, Bullet and Srinagar which is in production. He also has credits as a film writer, music director and lyricist.

== Awards ==
He has won the following awards:

- Box office film Award
- NEFTA film Award
- D cine Award
- Dancer cine award
