= Ramesh Prasad Yadav (Nepalese politician) =

Nepali politician

Honourable Ramesh Prasad Yadav
- रमेश प्रसाद यादव

General Secretary of Nepal Socialist Party
- Incumbent
- Assumed office 2022
- President: Baburam Bhattarai

Member of National Assembly
- In office 2018–2020
- Constituency: Madhesh Province

Personal details
- Born: Bara, Madhesh Province, Nepal
- Party: Nepal Socialist Party

Ramesh Prasad Yadav (Nepali: रमेश प्रसाद यादव) is a Nepali politician belonging to Nepal Socialist Party. Yadav is a former member of National Assembly. Since 2022, Yadav has served as the general secretary of the Baburam Bhattarai-led Nepal Socialist Party.
