= Mahendra Lawoti =

American academic (born 1965)

- Born: February 25, 1965 (age 60)
- Education: Doctor in Philosophy
- Occupation: University Professor
- Employer: Western Michigan University
- Known for: Introducing inclusive democracy in Nepal

Mahendra Lawoti (born February 25, 1965) was a professor at the department of political science at Western Michigan University, writer of several books and Ph.D. from the University of Pittsburgh with dissertation of Exclusionary Democratization: Multicultural Society and Political Institutions in Nepal.
