= Mardi Himal =

Mountain in Nepal

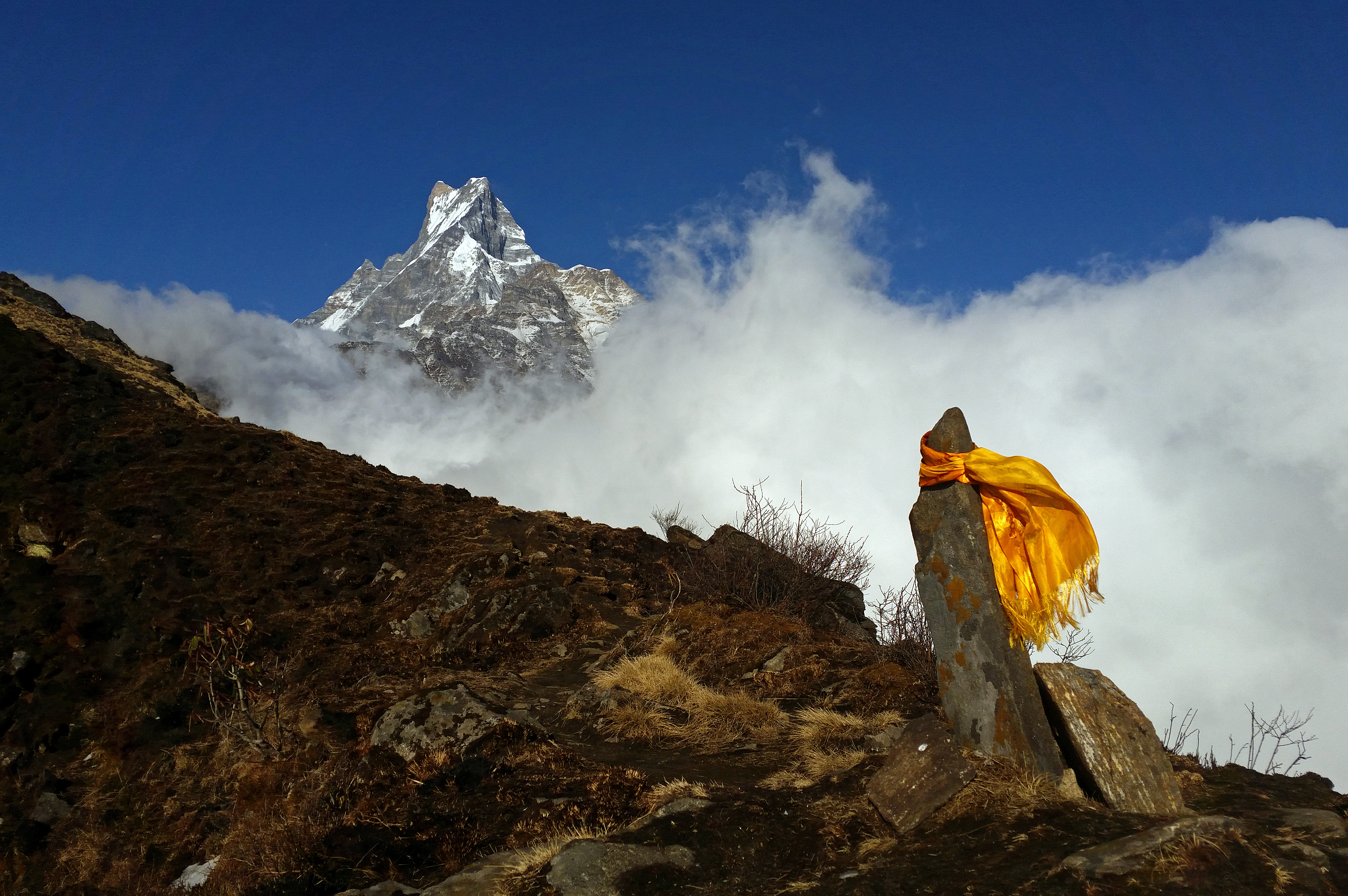

Highest point
- Elevation: 5,587 m (18,330 ft)
- Listing: Mountains of Nepal
- Coordinates: 28°28′25″N 83°55′39″E

Geography
- Location within Nepal
- Country: Nepal
- Parent range: Annapurna Himal, Himalayas

Climbing
- First ascent: 1961 by Basil Goodfellow

Mardi Himal (Nepali: मार्दी हिमाल) is a 5,587-metre (18,330 ft) peak beneath the much more prominent Machapuchare in the Annapurna region of Nepal, from which it is separated by a 5,200 metres (17,060 ft) col. It was first summited in 1961 by Basil Goodfellow.

== The Mardi Himal trek ==
In 2012, the Mardi Himal Trek hiking route was opened, following a ridge towards the summit, with lodges and teahouses open to an elevation of 3,550m, with a further climb to "Base Camp" at 4,500m. The peak itself is classified by the Nepalese government as a "trekking peak" and is offered by many expedition companies. The trek starts from the city of Pokhara and follows the route through the villages of Dhampus and Pothana, passing through dense forests of oak, rhododendron, and bamboo. The trail then heads towards the Mardi Himal Base Camp, which is located at an altitude of 4,500 meters.

The Mardi Himal trek is undertaken by as many Nepalese tourists as international ones. There are three major villages between Pokhara and Mardi Himal. The first one is either Dhampus or an Australian base camp that has over 30 homestay and tea houses. Then, the next top is Forest Camp with 7-8 tea houses. There are two camps above that, Low Camp and High Camp. Among these High, Camp has a larger number of guest houses and accommodates a large number of tourists.

In March 2023, Nepal made new rules for trekking in its national parks saying that tourists who are not from Nepal are not allowed to trek alone in places like Mardi Himal, and must be accompanied by a licensed guide. As of May 2024 the rule is not being actively enforced, and independent trekking within the Annapurna Conservation Area remains commonplace.

== Wildlife ==
Researchers conducted two bird surveys in the winter and summer of 2019, starting from where the SETI-Gandaki River meets with Low Camp on Mardi Himal. The researcher counted birds every 100 meters while climbing from 1030 meters above sea level to 3050 meters above sea level and looked at how different factors like the environment affected the number and type of birds they found. They recorded 673 birds of 152 different species, with 72 species observed in winter and 80 in summer. They saw that as they climbed higher in the mountains, the number of species first increased, reached a peak, and then decreased again. This happened in both winter and summer. Factors like temperature, precipitation, distance to water sources, and distance to human settlements affected the richness of bird species with certain types of birds being influenced more strongly by climate variables. In Mardi Himal the variety of birds is influenced by different factors such as where they live, how hot and rainy it is, what food is available, and if there are any disturbances.

Wildlife in Mardi Himal: - Chances to spot different creatures while trekking in the Annapurna region. On the routes, hikers can find the Himalayan monal, the national bird of Nepal, On top of the pheasants, langurs, and mountain goats. Various types of deer as well as brightly colored birds can be found in the wooded paths; Still, the higher elevations are sometimes where one might encounter seldom seen Himalayan fauna.
