= Marino Curnis =

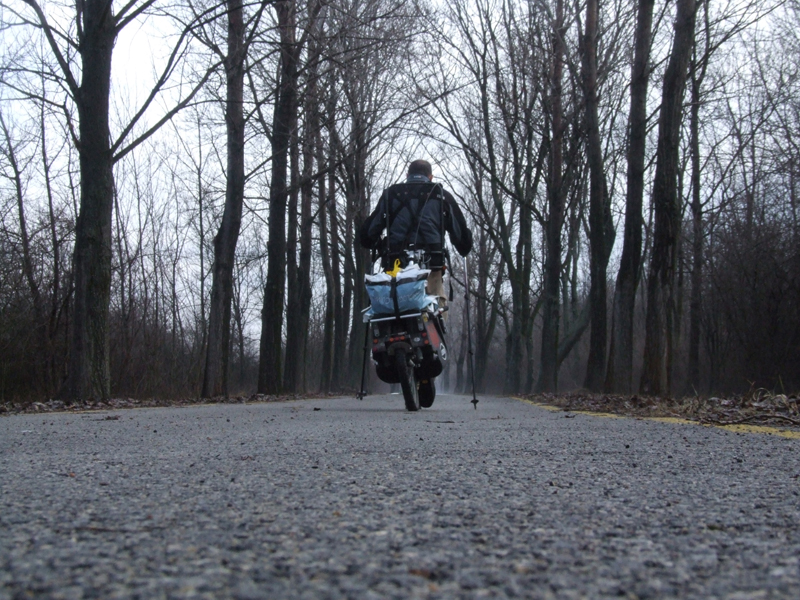

Marino Curnis (born 7 May 1973) is an Italian writer, poet, musician, language student and traveller. He is known mainly because of his travel on foot from Bergamo, Italy, to Iran. His trip was called Eurasia Pedibus Calcantibus. It covered 6.000 kilometres over 13 months (9 January 2006 – 7 February 2007).

== Early life ==
Marino Curnis was born in Bergamo, Italy. In 2003, he started to learn Esperanto, and he earned first and second level diplomas. He has a Nursery Assistant School Diploma and a two-year course at Liceo specializing in humanities.

== Travelling ==
He has taken many journeys on foot.

In the Alps he ascended: Punta Rossa (Aosta, mt.3660), Pizzo Coca, Pizzo Camino, Pizzo Tre Signori and Corno Stella.. He twice trekked "Sentiero delle Orobie Orientali".

In 2003, he walked along the "Camino de Santiago do Compostela" in the North of Spain, from St.Jean Pie-du-Port (France) to Santiago de Compostela (1021 km in 37 days).

In 2006, he walked from Bergamo, Italy to Iran in 13 months, through 9 nations (Italy, Austria, Hungary, Roumania, Bulgaria, Turkey, Moldavia, Ukraine, Iran) and along 6000 kilometres.

In 2007, he trekked Annapurna, from Besisahar to Pokhara (Nepal).He covered 230 kilometres in 18 days. During this trek, he climbed Thorung-La, 5416m above sea level.

In 2016, he walked from Rome (Italy) to Amboise (France) in 2 months, covering about 2000 kilometres following the footsteps of Leonardo da Vinci, who did this probable itinerary in 1516.

In 2018, Marino walked the Appian Way from Rome to Brindisi and over to Leuca, 750 kilometres in less than a month.

== Other Travellings ==
- 17/10/1998-24/01/1999 INDIA: Mumbai (Bombay); VARANASI (Benares).
- 20/06/2001-20/08/2001 GERMANIA: Waldkirchen, Bayern.
- 27/09/2001-26/11/2001 NEPAL: Pathiani Town, Chitwan.
- 26/11/2001-05/01/2001 INDIA: da Darjeeling a Pushkar, India del nord.
- 06/02/2001-06/03/2001 (SPAIN): Lanzarote, Islas Canarias.
- 31/05/2003-05/04/2003 FRANCE: Paris.
- 06/04/2003-12/05/2003 SPAIN: Camino de Santiago do Compostela
- 13/05/2003-22/05/2003 PORTUGAL: Porto; Lisboa.
- 14/07/2003-30/07/2003 INDIA AND NEPAL: New Delhi; Pathiani Town.
- 28/11/2003-13/12/2003 PORTUGAL: tour con mezzi pubblici.
- 09/01/2006-10/02/2007 EURASIA PEDIBUS CALCANTIBUS: Italia-Iran on foot.
- 16/10/2007-15/12/2007 NEPAL: tour and trekking of Annapurna.
- 17/05/2016-17/07/2016 LEONARDO 1516: Rome (Italy)-Amboise (France) on foot.
- 15/10/2018-11/11/2018 APPIA A PIEDI: Rome (Italy)-Brindisi and then Leuca (Italy) on foot.

== Bibliography ==
- Marino Curnis, Esploratore Involontario, Lupo&SoleEdizioni, 2003. Languages: Italian.
- Marino Curnis, Il Sogno Calpestato, Tera Mata, 2008. Languages: Italian.
- Marino Curnis, ORME-Visioni&Poesia di un Viaggiatore, Lupo&SoleEdizioni, 2008. Languages: Italian, Esperanto.
- Marino Curnis, Il Circuito dell'Annapurna, Lupo&SoleEdizioni, 2009. Languages: Italian.
- Marino Curnis, Amor ch'ha nullo amato amar perdona, Lupo&SoleEdizioni, 2009. Languages: Italian.
- Marino Curnis, XIX, Lupo&SoleEdizioni, 2009. Languages: Italian, Esperanto, English.
- Marino Curnis, Il Codice Aramaico – il Vangelo dei due Messia, Lupo&SoleEdizioni, 2014. Languages: Italian.
- Marino Curnis, Torniamo a Giocare – Novanta e più Giochi Antichi e Nuovi per tornare a giocare, Lupo&SoleEdizioni, 2015. Languages: Italian.
- Marino Curnis, Mamme e cuccioli (Stella Stellina), Lupo&SoleEdizioni, 2015. Languages: Italian.
- Marino Curnis, Karina e Karano, Lupo&SoleEdizioni, 2015. Languages: Italian.
- Marino Curnis, Giochiamo a DADI, Lupo&SoleEdizioni, 2015. Languages: Italian.
- Marino Curnis, Il cammino di Leonardo, Lupo&SoleEdizioni, 2017. Languages: Italian.
- Marino Curnis, Raccolta Delle Lettere a Leonardo da Vinci Custodite Nel Castello Reale Di Amboise, Lupo&SoleEdizioni, 2017. Languages: Italian.
- Marino Curnis, Itinerari Leonardeschi: 16 Itinerari a Piedi da Roma a Milano all’ombra di Leonardo da Vinci, Lupo&SoleEdizioni, 2017. Languages: Italian.
- Marino Curnis, La figlia di Heidi, Lupo&SoleEdizioni, 2017. Languages: Italian.
- Marino Curnis, La Via Appia a piedi- Vol.I, Ediciclo Editore, 2019. Languages: Italian.
- Marino Curnis, A piedi sull'Appia antica, Andrea Pacilli Editore, 2019. Languages: Italian.
